= Futaba Sakura =

Persona 5 character

- Persona character
- Futaba Sakura in Persona 5
- First game: Persona 5 (2016)
- Designed by: Shigenori Soejima
- Voiced by: EN: Erica Lindbeck; JA: Aoi Yūki
- Motion capture: Ayumi Miyazaki
- Portrayed by: Mei Fukuda (stage play)

In-universe information
- Nationality: Japanese

Futaba Sakura (佐倉 双葉, Sakura Futaba), also known by her codename Oracle (ナヴィ; Navi in the original Japanese version), is one of the main characters in the 2016 video game Persona 5. She is a member of the Phantom Thieves of Hearts, as well as their navigator, taking over the position from Morgana. She starts the game as a shut-in who does not go to school, leave her house, or have any friends, due to the grief and self-loathing she experienced over feeling that she was responsible for her mother's suicide, eventually joining the Phantom Thieves after recruiting them for their otherworldly services.

She was originally designed with black hair and a goth aesthetic, and is voiced by Erica Lindbeck in English and Aoi Yūki in Japanese. Lindbeck was told to come up with her own voice profile to avoid sounding like Yūki. She appeared in multiple sequels and spin-offs of Persona 5, including Persona 5 Strikers and Tactica. She has also appeared in non-video game adaptations of Persona 5, including through anime, manga, live performance, musical, and others.

Ever since her original appearance, she has been generally well received, receiving multiple pieces of merchandise. She was the fourth highest-rated character in a PlayStation poll, and was regarded as a role model by multiple critics due to her depression and the path she took to overcome it.

== Appearances ==
Futaba Sakura first appeared in the 2016 video game Persona 5 as the seventh character to join the main cast. She is a shut-in and otaku who enjoys various mediums, including video games and anime. She is the adopted daughter of Sojiro Sakura, the owner of Café Leblanc. Before the events of Persona 5, her mother, Wakaba Isshiki, rarely spent time with her due to her working so much to support her, causing Futaba to believe that she cared more about her work than her. She went into a deep depression after watching her mother step into traffic, with a suicide note stating that Futaba was to blame, which was read aloud to her during Wakaba's funeral out of spite. After taking her in, Sojiro allowed her to not attend school and spend all her time in her bedroom. She grew worse over time, eventually developing a suicidal ideation. Due to her desire for her mother to be alive and her belief that she deserved to die, a Palace, a metaphysical manifestation of a person's distorted desires, forms, where her mother lives and wants her dead. While spending time in her room, she becomes a proficient hacktivist named Medjed that gets appropriated by people around the world; in turn, she assumes the identity of Alibaba and quits hacktivism.

During the events of Persona 5, an IT company president begins using the Medjed label to threaten to out the Phantom Thieves, the hero group of the game, in order to stop them from continuing going after high-profile people. The Phantom Thieves do this by going into Palaces and stealing the owner's Treasure, a representation of corrupted desires; upon stealing the Treasure, it causes the owner's heart to change. Futaba also discovers that the characters Joker, Ryuji, Morgana, Ann, Yusuke, and Makoto are the Phantom Thieves due to a covert listening device she planted at Leblanc, where Joker lives and the Phantom Thieves often congregate. She then anonymously tries to get them to steal her own heart, threatening to out them if they don't do so. While she tries to cancel after they tried to learn more about her, they deduce her identity and continue to approach her because "Medjed" is still threatening them. They discover the situation from Sojiro, and eventually gain access to her Palace, represented as a tomb in the desert commanded by the Shadow version of herself. They eventually make it through her Palace, encountering a cognitive version of Wakaba, who takes on the form of a sphinx. Futaba then realizes that she has a strange app on her phone, allowing her to enter the Palace in the same way the Phantom Thieves did. She encounters her own Shadow, who helps her remember how unusual her mother's death was. This causes her to awaken to her Persona, Necronomicon, and she helps the Phantom Thieves defeat Cognitive Wakaba by serving as support. After defeating her, Wakaba returns to normal, expressing her love for Futaba before disappearing. They return to the real world, hacking the fake Medjed to take their website down.

Futaba begins to come out of her shell after joining the Phantom Thieves, assuming the thief name "Oracle" and intending to discover the truth behind her mother's death. She assists in future missions, including Kunikazu Okumura, the father of the newest Phantom Thief Haru Okumura. After stealing his heart, he eventually passes away, and the Phantom Thieves become blamed for this. Sojiro eventually discovers that Joker, Futaba, and the others are Phantom Thieves, but keeps their secret after learning their goals and determination. Eventually, Futaba helps Joker fake his death after realizing that Goro Akechi, a young detective, may be the one responsible for Kunikazu Okumura's death. The group eventually manage to steal the heart of Masayoshi Shido, one of the main antagonists of the story, as well as confronting the man behind the fake Medjed.

== Concept and creation ==
Futaba Sakura was created for Persona 5 by Shigenori Soejima. Early concept art for Futaba depicted her with black hair and a goth aesthetic while sometimes wearing activewear. This design's hairstyle and glasses are still present in the final design. The goggles she wears in her Phantom Thief outfit were originally used by Ann Takamaki in her Phantom Thief outfit before they were given to Futaba. Futaba has the Persona Necronomicon, which transforms into Promethius when Futaba has her next awakening. During development, it was decided that one of the first five Personas conceived, one had to be for a female character, with one being Futaba's. They were unsure if the gender of Futaba's second Persona should match hers. They decided to make it an object-type god, like they did with Necronomicon, instead of a male god. The character Goro Akechi is responsible for the death of Futaba's mother, Wakaba Isshiki; in Persona 5 Royal, the writers intentionally made Futaba and fellow Phantom Thief Haru Okumura more distanced from Akechi than the others due to not having forgiven him for his actions.

Futaba is voiced by Aoi Yūki in the Japanese version and by Erica Lindbeck in the English version. Lindbeck found the role "daunting" due to how "all over the place" Futaba is, citing her wide range of emotions and vocals, though she also felt that gave her more freedom in the portrayal. Lindbeck was brought on to do voicework for Persona 5 before Futaba was announced in Japan, and was then offered to voice a "little hacker girl". She was given little information at first due to little being available at the time, as well as Atlus wanting the English voice cast to have them develop their own iteration instead of mimicking the Japanese voice cast. However, she eventually got more information to help develop her voice profile. This lead her to make an "outlandish" character whose outlandishness was understandable. She approached Futaba with the notion that she existed on the autism spectrum. Lindbeck related to Futaba, saying "Who hasn't felt lonely, socially awkward, slightly agoraphobic, or like you're not good enough?" Lindbeck was particularly worried about this role, as she regarded Persona as a series where not being able to buy into a character was more damaging than normal for a game series.

In Persona 5: Dancing Star Night, Futaba is portrayed by motion actor Ayumi Miyazaki. Miyazaki compared her to Fuuka Yamagishi from Persona 3 due to them both being navigators and seeming like they would not be able to dance. Miyazaki thought about how Futaba would dance, such as how she would pose at the beginning and whether she would do similar poses to her Featherman figures. She choreographed her dances by imagining her story and the scenes that would be included, as well as playing Persona 5 to understand her character. She was asked to tap dance for this role, which created a running joke of other staff members telling her to be more quiet, even when she was already making no sound. Scenario writer and choreographer of Dancing Star Night, Teppei Kobayashi, commented that she was so able to get into character because she had similar traits to Futaba, including being an airhead, a gamer, and preferring to stay indoors. Kobayashi discussed how at times, they had to do retakes due to Miyazaki's performance being too precise and powerful, suggesting that Futaba would not have enough stamina for that. There was also a dance where Kobayashi wanted it to be a sexy choreography, but also wanted Miyazaki to not look sexy while doing it, as it would not suit Futaba.

== Promotion and reception ==
Futaba Sakura has received multiple pieces of promotional material, including a jacket based on the jacket she wears in the game created by Japanese cosplay company Cospa. Headphones created by AKG were also produced based on Futaba's headphones. She received a 1/7th scale figure from Phat! Company, which was based on her original illustration, originally announced during the Persona 20th Anniversary Special. This figure is slated to re-release in 2024. She also received a figure from Good Smile in the Nendoroid line, being the second in the Persona 5 line of Nendoroid figures. This figure was later re-released in 2023. A figure of Futaba in her Oracle form accompanied by her Persona, Necronomicon, was announced at MegaHobby Expo 2023 by Amakuni.

Since her reveal, Futaba Sakura has been met with generally positive reception, ranked as the fourth of the main Persona 5 cast in a Japanese poll conducted by PlayStation. Destructoid writer Chris Moyse considered her one of if not the most popular character in Persona 5, arguing that her shared Social Link with Sojiro and the issues she deals with made hers the best narrative in the game. Fanbyte writer Kris Ligman similarly enjoyed Futaba, considering her one of the most relatable characters they'd experienced. The Gamer writer Abby Espiritu considered Futaba a role model, and one of the reasons she is still around. She discussed various life challenges, such as losing her friend group and her brother contracting Stage 4 Non-Hodgkin's Lymphoma, and her feeling that this was all her fault and thus she did not deserve to feel sad. Persona 5 served as escapism for her, and that when Futaba entered the story, she found her relatable due to them both having gone from an "excitable and giddy" person to someone who had "fallen into this pit of [despair]." Seeing Futaba overcome her demons and build relationships with the other Phantom Thieves inspired her to do the same for herself, leading to her life improving.

The Gamer writer Stacey Henley criticized Persona 5 for including Futaba as a romance option. She admitted that Futaba was of a comparable age to Joker and they didn't grow up together, but she argued that Futaba viewed Joker as a big brother, finding it strange and out of place that Joker can romance her. Fellow The Gamer writer Jade King was similarly critical of the possible relationship, calling it a "gross anime trope." In another article, Henley felt that Futaba was the "real star" of Persona 5 Strikers, saying that the game was more important to exist for Futaba than any other character while appreciating that the romance in the first game was absent in this one. She regarded both the increased gameplay involvement of Futaba, as well as the fact that she was introduced at the beginning of Strikers unlike in Persona 5, as reasons for this.

Comic Book Resources writer Timothy Donohoo considered Futaba's awakening the best in the game, comparing it to the awakenings the main characters of Persona 4 experienced, namely the fact that she has to face her own Shadow. He also drew comparisons between Futaba and Nanako Dojima, also from Persona 4, particularly the fact that they both have a strong affinity for their dead mothers in their respective musical themes. AV Club writer Clayton Purdom felt she was "obnoxious on a surface level" due in part to her awkwardness, but also talked about how, despite being written to annoy players, she can "still pull something out of the player[s]." He also appreciated how she changes the dynamic of the main group. USgamer writer Caty McCarthy also felt that she improved the group, becoming its "emotional core," and feeling like she enhances the game overall when she's introduced. She praised her journey of recovering from the grief of her mother's death, saying that it was realistic how gradual it was, and how she never loses her social awkwardness, just gets better at managing it. Writer Melissa Jane Lewis discussed Futaba as a crone archetype, particularly in how similar Futaba is to her mother, as well as drawing comparisons between Futaba's isolation and the yamamba's. She then discussed how Futaba differed from that mythology by virtue of being given a reprieve from her suffering, free from the distorted version of her mother upon her by others, as well as no longer manipulated by male objectivity. Writer Arnaud Bourdouxhe-Nélissen discussed how Futaba aligns with the Sin of Wrath, particularly in how she becomes self-destructive following her mother's apparent suicide, which is contrasted by the revengeful side of Wrath, represented by the distorted view of her mother, who blames Futaba for her death.
