= Haru Okumura =

Persona 5 character

- Persona character
- Haru Okumura, as she appears in Persona 5
- First game: Persona 5 (2016)
- Designed by: Shigenori Soejima
- Voiced by: EN: Xanthe Huynh; JA: Haruka Tomatsu
- Motion capture: Smile Saki (Note: Persona 5: Dancing in Starlight)
- Portrayed by: Riko Sugahara (stage play)

In-universe information
- Nationality: Japanese

Haru Okumura (奥村 春, Okumura Haru), also known by her Phantom Thief name Noir, is one of the main characters in the 2016 video game Persona 5. She is a member of the vigilante group, the Phantom Thieves of Hearts, and one of the final members to join the group.

She was created by Shigenori Soejima, made to be a "sweet and shy" character raised in an affluent family aiming to change her father's ways, as well as to escape a marriage arrangement with her abusive fiancée. She has appeared in other titles, including Persona 5 Strikers, Persona 5 Royal, and Persona 5 Tactica.

She has received generally positive reception, though ranked low on popularity polls of the main cast, attributed to her relatively low exposure to players. Her appearance in Strikers was more well-received, with critics such as Luke Plunkett finding her significantly improved compared to Persona 5. Following her expanded appearance in Royal, she has been more well-received than her appearance in the original game.

== Concept and creation ==
Haru Okumura is a female teenager designed by Shigenori Soejima for the 2016 video game Persona 5. She is a third-year high school student at Shujin Academy, and the heiress to her father's business and fortune. During her time at Shujin, she and other students awaken to their supernatural powers known as Personas and become a group of vigilantes known as the Phantom Thieves of Hearts. The team reforms amoral or criminal targets by confronting them in their Palaces in the Metaverse, which is a manifestation of human desires. These Palaces belong to people with particularly strong distorted desires. Each member at one point went through an awakening to their Persona, a being that forms in response to the person's desire for rebellion, and they gain an outfit to represent this and assumes a thief name; in Haru's case, she chooses Noir. Game artist Akanye Kabayashi identified Haru as one of her favorite characters to draw due to her bob hairstyle. Haru is a "sweet and shy" character who was raised in an affluent family, and has been obedient to her father. She is designed to be standoffish at first due to her seeming as though she is in a different world, but becomes friendlier as she gets closer to the rest of the cast. The character Hifumi Togo was originally planned to be a playable character, but was replaced by Makoto and made a side character, with an aspect of her character, being controlled by adults, being incorporated into Haru's character. Haru is one of the only Phantom Thief members to be canonically in love with Joker.

Haru has a Persona named Milady; this Persona eventually awakens and becomes Astarte. The designers wanted to emphasize how her Persona, like Haru, became organic after being artificial. They also reflected how Haru and her Persona bore similarities with Makoto and her Persona; they cited their similar grade and gender, as well as having controlling adults in their life and no father as a reason for why their Persona come from similar roots.

=== Dancing in Starlight ===
Haru's room in Persona 5: Dancing in Starlight was difficult for art designer Azusa Shimada to design, stating that they deliberately avoided things that showed off her hobbies or personality, as they wanted to reflect her coming from a sheltered life controlled by her father. Teppei Kobayashi, a choreographer and scenario writer for Dancing in Starlight felt that she would not fit well with a street style like most of the other characters. He gave her design a ballet corset, opting to go with a gothic style for her outfit, which he was happy with, considering it his favorite of the designs.

In Dancing in Starlight, Haru's dancing is performed by motion actor dancer Smile Saki. Kobayashi discovered Saki while she was doing a ballet dance, and she was asked to do it for this game, to which she accepted. She did not feel comfortable with her level of ballet skill at the time, so she took lessons and practiced her choreography, only to be informed that the emphasis on ballet was too strong. She was asked to do a kind of ballet that normal people would appreciate, and not worry too much about the rules of ballet. This was difficult for Saki, who had these rules ingrained in her due to her long history of doing ballet. Kobayashi noted that his reasoning was that too great a focus on dancing beautifully would take away from Haru's personality.

=== Voice ===
Haru was voiced in Japanese by Haruka Tomatsu and in English by Xanthe Huynh. When she was given the role, the latter was only told that she would be voicing a character in a video game without specifying who she was voicing or the game she'd be working on. Only after signing non-disclosure agreements did she find out she was working on Persona 5. This was atypical for her, as she did not audition for the role. She was then given a description of Haru and an image of her. When performing Haru, the only thing Huynh found tricky was "going beyond certain constraints," trying to balance this so that even if it goes out of character, it's still justified in her character. The recording process was spread out over a year, and Huynh considered it very long, longer than most anime projects. She considered it one of her most-known roles. She reprised her role in Persona 5: The Animation, which is an anime adaption of Persona 5

== Appearances ==
Haru first appeared in the 2016 Persona 5 as one of its main characters, joining the Phantom Thieves of Hearts, a group of people who have the power to change people's hearts by stealing their Treasures in a metaphysical place called the Metaverse. She is one of the final members to join the group. She later appeared in the new version of Persona 5, Persona 5 Royal, which added new content including Haru and other characters, as well as introducing her sooner in the story. After Morgana leaves the group after a dispute with Ryuji, he goes off on his own to attempt to steal a Treasure from the Palace of Kunizaku Okumura, Haru's father, ultimately accepting Haru's assistance after she winds up in her father's Palace, a manifestation of someone's distorted view of the world within the Metaverse. During this period, Haru awakens to her Persona, Milady, and assuming the moniker Noir. She ultimately succeeds in changing her father's heart, only for him to be killed, unbeknownst to her and the others. She aides the others in further missions, ultimately succeeding in defeating the true villain, Yaldabaoth.

She appears in other titles, including a new version of Persona 5 titled Persona 5 Royal, Persona 5: Dancing in Starlight, Persona 5 Strikers, Persona 5 Tactica, and Persona 5: The Phantom X.

Haru appears as a playable character in Persona Q2: New Cinema Labyrinth, being unlocked after defeating the first boss, Kamoshidaman.

Haru appears in Super Smash Bros. Ultimate as a Spirit, being released in the Fighters Pass DLC alongside Joker.

== Promotion and reception ==
Haru Okumura has received multiple pieces of merchandise since her appearance in Persona 5. The candle company Wick & Skull, in collaboration with Atlus and Sega, produced a candle based on Haru that has scents of freesia, lilac, and peach.

Haru has been generally well-received; despite this, she was the lowest-ranked on a poll of playable Persona 5 characters, which Rock Paper Shotgun writer Kaan Serin attributed to the fact that she had little time for players to get to know her compared to the rest. The A.V. Club writer Clayton Purdom, while criticizing how long Persona 5 is, felt Haru's story was "entirely disposable." Kotaku writer Luke Plunkett similarly felt Haru was unnecessary, stating what while her story was tragic, it and her personality were not compelling to anyone besides people who are "really into knitwear." Despite Plunkett's initial disinterest in Haru, he felt that being away from Persona 5's "latter-stages grind" improved her considerably in Persona 5 Strikers, making her one of his favorite characters. Part of the appeal for Plunkett was how Haru's experience caused her to dislike police. The Gamer writer Stacey Henley noted that her line criticizing the police was her most memorable line in the series. Fellow The Gamer writer Cian Maher similarly found himself enjoying her more thanks to Strikers, calling her "quick, witty, and genuinely funny" while still having a warm personality. He speculated that her shift away from pleasing others has led to her being more critical of the police.

The Mary Sue writer Madeline Carpou criticized the execution of other girls in the game, such as Ann, stating that Ann did not develop much beyond the first act. She initially did not care about Haru since she seemed like a typical "soft sweet yet secretly murderous" girl, but grew to enjoy her more, considering her "surprisingly cool" and praising her character development while regretting pursuing romance with Ann instead of Haru. She felt frustrated that Persona 5 introduced Haru so late into the game. IGN writer Izzatul Razali considered her one of the best female characters in the series, saying that she represents "independence and strength" and that her "kind-hearted and socially awkward" nature makes her "lovable." GameSpot writer Jess Howard was initially not as interested in Haru in Persona 5, but grew to like her more in Persona 5 Tactica.

Stacey Henley felt that she was an underrated romance option in the game, saying that Makoto and Ann are the positioned as the "obvious choices" due to being complementary designs, with Ann being "blond, beautiful, and feminine" and Makoto having an "aggressive take-charge attitude" with "boyish mousey hair." She felt that Haru missed out due to being introduced much later, at which point players likely already chose a romance route. She also felt that the location she was found in, the vegetable garden, was so out of the way, and thus players would only go there for the sake of finding her, unlike others, who are easily found. Henley, however, felt this fit her character, discussing how her outfit and body language suggested she was an "incredibly shy" character. She felt that this shyness made it more difficult to pursue her romance, finding that hers was rewarding.

Writer Melissa Jane Lewis discussed the Snake archetype, which has its origins in a woman spurned by a dishonest man in a tale meant to warn "pious young men of the dangers of interacting with men." She discussed how Haru has similar themes to this archetype, citing how she is initially pressured into an arranged marriage by her father, only for the Phantom Thieves to save her, leading her to go from someone who is "obedient and meek" to someone who is "confident" and "somewhat sadistic." She noted that while the roles of Haru and the Snake are "slightly reversed," discussing how both are deceived by men, and are then "admonished for acting in a deviant manner" when their "grief and rage" cause them to transform, going against gender norms and embracing a more assertive, bold, and sexually free side of themselves. Writer Martin Ivančić discussed Haru's language profile, talking about how her dialogue conveyed empathy as well as reflecting her upbringing and how she tends to compliment people who exhibit similarly kind natures, which he argued emphasized that she was a sincere person. He also discussed how her dialogue allows her personality to be understood through her enjoyment of nature and empathy. He also discussed the similarities between the linguistic profiles of Haru and Ann, namely due to Ann's empathy, but noted that Ann differed in some ways, such as how Haru's formality contrasts with Ann's more casual dialogue, suggesting that her personality was a mixture of Haru's and Ryuji's. Vice writer Sloane Cee felt that Persona 5 became less about the cast being outsiders as the game went along. They noted that while characters like Haru may feel "out of place" and "rejected," their "fundamental privilege and secure positions" make it difficult for these characters to understand what it means to be isolated.
