= List of Persona 5 characters =

Playable characters from Persona 5: (left to right) Makoto, Ann, Yusuke, Joker, Haru, Ryuji, Morgana and Futaba

Persona 5, a 2016 role-playing video game by Atlus, is set in Tokyo beginning on April 9 of the year "20XX" (2016). It centers on the Phantom Thieves of Hearts, (Note: Kokoro no kaitō-dan (心の怪盗団) in Japanese. The team's name, which can be changed in the game, is known as The Phantoms (ザ・ファントム, Za Fantomu).) a masked vigilante group of high-school students working to change people's hearts and have them confess their crimes. They do this by defeating a physical manifestation of their subconscious in a mysterious realm known as the Metaverse, accessed through a mobile app on their smartphones. The playable characters can be controlled in the game's many locations, such as "Palaces", which are created by people with great desires and a distorted perception of the world.

The player character is a silent protagonist codenamed Joker, a high school student who moves to Tokyo after being falsely accused of assault and expelled from his former school, and later forms the Phantom Thieves and becomes its leader. He forms it with Morgana, a mysterious cat-like creature who is the Thieves' second-in-command and guide in the Metaverse, who wants to discover his origins and restore his true form, and Ryuji Sakamoto, who is seen as a delinquent at his school due to an incident involving his former track team. Over time, more characters join the group, including fashion model Ann Takamaki, art prodigy Yusuke Kitagawa, student-council president Makoto Niijima, hacker and foster daughter of Sojiro Sakura, Futaba Sakura and business heiress Haru Okumura. Also interacting with Joker are Goro Akechi, a high-school student and ace detective; Sae Niijima, a public prosecutor and Makoto's older sister; and Igor and his assistants, Caroline and Justine, who are residents of the Velvet Room.

Many of the game's characters represent the tarot's Major Arcana suit. Although the suit has twenty-two cards and Royal-exclusive characters account for two additional alternate Arcana for a total of twenty-four, only twenty-one (twenty-three in Royal) are represented by characters; the last one, The World, is given at a later point in the game. The seven deadly sins are a recurring theme within the game, with certain characters and situations representing them.

== Creation and design ==
The game's character design and setting distinguish it from previous entries in the series, replacing Persona 4's yellow-and-green palette with reds and blacks. As with Persona 3 and Persona 4, its characters were designed by Shigenori Soejima. In an interview, Soejima said that he could not design the characters without the game's theme and plot being set first, so he was given detailed instructions from the producer during the process. He also worked on the color scheme and overall visual presentation. In addition to casual and school apparel, each of the Phantom Thieves have their own thematic costumes with masks when in the Metaverse, as well as codenames.

== The Phantom Thieves of Hearts ==
=== Founding members ===
Joker (ジョーカー, Jōkā)
Voiced by: Jun Fukuyama (Japanese); Xander Mobus (English)
The protagonist, who as a Phantom Thief goes by the codename "Joker", is the game's main playable character. He is a second-year high school student who gets expelled after being falsely accused of assault by a corrupt politician. As a result, he leaves his hometown and moves in with a family friend in Tokyo to serve a one-year probation. Upon transferring to a new school, he and several other students awaken to a supernatural power known as the Persona. Soon after, they form a vigilante group known as the Phantom Thieves of Hearts to explore the Metaverse, a metaphysical realm consisting of the physical manifestations of humanity's subconscious desires, and remove malevolent intent from people's hearts.

He holds the "Wild Card", an ability that allows him to hold more than one Persona and fuse together Personas to create new ones. His original Persona is Arsène, based on Arsène Lupin, of the Fool Arcana and he fights using knives and handguns. His ultimate Persona is Satanael, the Gnostic equivalent of the devil, (Note: The "Ultimate Persona" is a character's final, or most powerful Persona) a deity who can harness the power of the seven deadly sins. Joker also appears in spin-off games Persona 5: Dancing in Starlight, Persona 5 Strikers, Persona 5 Tactica, and Persona Q2: New Cinema Labyrinth, as a playable character in the crossover fighting game Super Smash Bros. Ultimate and in various other cross-promotions outside of the series. He is portrayed by Hiroki Ino in Persona 5: The Stage. While the player can freely name Joker in the game, he is canonically named Ren Amamiya (雨宮蓮, Amamiya Ren) in most appearances and Akira Kurusu (来栖暁, Kurusu Akira) in the manga adaptation.

Morgana (モルガナ, Morugana)
Voiced by: Ikue Ōtani (Japanese); Cassandra Lee Morris (English)
Morgana, who as a Phantom Thief goes by the codename "Mona", is an amnesiac and mysterious bicolor cat-like creature who encounters Joker after they free him from his cell in Kamoshida's Palace. Wanting to discover his origins and restore his true form, he joins Joker in his heists, teaching him and his allies the mechanics of the Metaverse and the ropes of being a phantom thief, while serving as the second-in-command of the vigilante group. Hashino describes Morgana as similar to Persona 4's Teddie and as a mentor of the Phantom Thieves. Outside of the Metaverse, Morgana takes the form of a domestic cat and lives with Joker.

His Persona is Zorro, which Hashino describes as Morgana's ideal human form. Morgana fights using a slingshot and a curved sword. He can transform into a minivan in the Metaverse (modeled after the Citroën Type H), which allows the Phantom Thieves to travel quickly. Morgana represents the Magician Arcana as a Confidant, and allows Joker to craft tools to help the Phantom Thieves explore the Metaverse. As the Confidant progresses automatically, Morgana's Persona will transform into Mercurius. In Persona 5 Royal, his Persona can evolve into Diego. He seeks Joker's help to discover his true form, and believes that he was once human; as he spends time with Joker, however, he starts to put more importance on the bond they forged. As the Phantom Thieves go further into Mementos, (Note: Mementos is a large dungeon in-game, the palace of the whole of society) Morgana regains his memories and learns that Igor created him to guide Joker against Yaldabaoth. After Yaldabaoth is defeated, Morgana loses his Metaverse form and vows to remain with Joker in hope of becoming human. In Royal, Morgana gains a human body when the Phantom Thieves were living in Maruki's reality. In Super Smash Bros. Ultimate, Morgana is featured in Joker's taunts, victory poses, and All-Out Attack Final Smash, in addition to being a Spirit and a background character on the Mementos stage as the Morganamobile. He also appears as a downloadable player character in Super Monkey Ball Banana Mania.

Ryuji Sakamoto (坂本 竜司, Sakamoto Ryūji)
Voiced by: Mamoru Miyano (Japanese); Max Mittelman (English)
Ryuji, who as a Phantom Thief goes by the codename "Skull", is Joker's first companion. Hashino describes Ryuji as "defiant" but a "nice guy". He is offended by the slightest comments from others, and sometimes resorts to violence. He has lived with his mother since his abusive, alcoholic father abandoned them.

Ryuji was formerly the star runner on Shujin Academy's track and field team, but after Kamoshida started spreading rumors about his troubled family life, he was enraged and tried to punch Kamoshida. In retaliation, Kamoshida broke Ryuji's leg in 'self-defense' and he was forced to quit the track team. As a result, the track team was suspended, and he was blamed for the incident, which earned him a reputation as a delinquent.

Ryuji's Persona is Captain Kidd. In battle, he fights using clubs and shotguns. As a confidant, he represents the Chariot Arcana and allows the Phantom Thieves to instantly defeat lower-level Shadows. Joker helps Ryuji rediscover his love for running and re-establish the track team. Despite reuniting the team, Ryuji plans to run on his own instead. Upon completing his Confidant, Ryuji's Persona takes the form of Seiten Taisei, who is known for his immense strength. In Persona 5 Royal, his Persona can evolve into William.

He is portrayed by Kouhei Shiota in Persona 5: The Stage. He appears in Super Smash Bros. Ultimate as a Spirit and as a background character on the Mementos stage.

Ann Takamaki (高巻 杏, Takamaki An)
Voiced by: Nana Mizuki (Japanese); Erika Harlacher (English)
Ann (Anne in the Japanese version) who as a Phantom Thief goes by the codename "Panther", is a one-quarter-American girl in Joker's class who recently returned to Japan. She is fluent in English and is a model. Hashino describes Ann as "the life of the party", who "will have an impact on the fate of the main characters." Despite her popularity, she lacks friends and is isolated and lonely. She is also shunned by the girls in her class because of her rumored relationship with the gym teacher Kamoshida.

Ann joins the Phantom Thieves after learning that her best friend, Shiho Suzui's, suicide attempt is linked to Kamoshida. Her Persona is Carmen, whom Hashino describes as a "femme fatale character." Ann fights using whips and submachine guns. As a Confidant, she represents the Lovers Arcana and helps Joker negotiate with Shadows. As Joker befriends her, Ann improves herself for Shiho and begins taking her modeling career seriously. After completing her Confidant, Ann's Persona evolves into Hecate. In Persona 5 Royal, her Persona can evolve into Célestine.

She is portrayed by Yuki Odera in Persona 5: The Stage. She appears in Super Smash Bros. Ultimate as a Spirit and a background character on the Mementos stage.

=== Later members ===
Yusuke Kitagawa (喜多川 祐介, Kitagawa Yūsuke)
Voiced by: Tomokazu Sugita (Japanese); Matthew Mercer (English)
Yusuke, who as a Phantom Thief goes by the codename "Fox", is a student in the fine-arts department of Kosei High School. He is composed, elegant, and observant, and has a passion for art and aesthetics. He has been sheltered throughout his life and is eccentric around others. Because he is poor, he often skips meals to save money for art supplies, eating ravenously when he can. Hashino describes him as "an eccentric character" with a "different charm" than you would expect from his appearance.

Yusuke's mother died when he was three years old, leaving him an orphan. He was taken in by his mentor, the painter Ichiryusai Madarame, whom he sees as a father figure and idolizes for creating his favorite painting, Sayuri. However, he is eventually forced to accept that Madarame is exploitative and abusive and plagiarizes his students for profit, robbing them of their passion for art. This leads him to awaken his Persona and join the Phantom Thieves. Eventually, he learns that Sayuri was a self-portrait by his mother holding him as an infant, and that Madarame allowed her to die from an easily treatable seizure to steal the credit for it. He also painted over Yusuke to decontextualize her expression, creating mystery for the sake of artistic appeal; this revelation enrages him and leads him to fully reject Madarame as a mentor.

Yusuke's Persona is Goemon. He fights using Japanese swords and assault rifles. As a Confidant, Yusuke represents the Emperor Arcana and assists the Phantom Thieves by copying skill cards. (Note: Skill cards are items in-game that allow the holder to learn new skills, magic or attacks) After Madarame's change of heart, Yusuke has difficulty regaining his ability to create art, but the protagonist helps him rediscover his love for art and the beauty of the world around him; this inspires him to paint Desire and Hope. After completing his Confidant, his Persona evolves into Kamu Susano-o. In Persona 5 Royal, his Persona can evolve into Gorokichi.

He is portrayed by Koji Kominami in Persona 5: The Stage, Stage #2, and Stage 4: Final and Yūnosuke Matsushima in Stage #3. He appears in Super Smash Bros. Ultimate as a Spirit and a background character on the Mementos stage.

Makoto Niijima (新島 真, Niijima Makoto)
Voiced by: Rina Satō (Japanese); Cherami Leigh (English)
Makoto, who as a Phantom Thief goes by the codename "Queen", is the president of Shujin Academy's student council. She is the school's top student and considered the brains of the Phantom Thieves for her analytical prowess, being able to deduce conclusions, theorize in several situations, and make elaborate plans. Behind this exterior, however, lies an inferiority complex, and she often praises her sister, Sae Niijima. Makoto feels that she is a burden to Sae because of their father's death, which has motivated her to work hard to succeed and reduce her sister's stress. Makoto starts tailing the Phantom Thieves to find information for Principal Kobayakawa, but she loses respect for Kobayakawa after realizing he was aware of Suguru Kamoshida's abuse of the student body but refused to intervene. When she discovers that a hangure is extorting Shujin students, Kobayakawa puts her at risk by forcing her to deal with the problem herself, causing her to act on her own agenda. After learning their identities, she tasks them with changing the heart of mafia boss Junya Kaneshiro. She then resolves to join and fight alongside them after tiring of others telling her what to do.

Makoto's Persona is Johanna, and she fights using revolvers and tekko. As a Confidant, Makoto represents the Priestess Arcana and provides the Phantom Thieves with a more detailed analysis of in-game enemies. As Joker gets closer to her, Makoto decides to become better-acquainted with her classmates and befriends Eiko Takao. She discovers that she is in a relationship with Tsukasa, a suspicious man who has manipulated girls into working for illegal businesses in Shinjuku. Makoto reveals Tsukasa's true nature to Eiko with Joker's help and decides to follow in her father's footsteps by joining the police force. After completing her Confidant, Makoto's Persona evolves into Anat. In Persona 5 Royal, her Persona can evolve into Agnes.

She is portrayed by Kanon Nanaki in Persona 5: The Stage #2 and Akari Ishizuka in Persona 5: The Stage #3. She appears in Super Smash Bros. Ultimate as a Spirit and a background character on the Mementos stage.

Futaba Sakura (佐倉 双葉, Sakura Futaba)
Voiced by: Aoi Yūki (Japanese); Erica Lindbeck (English)
Futaba, who as a Phantom Thief goes by the codename "Oracle" ("Navi" in the Japanese version), is the adopted daughter of Sojiro Sakura, the owner of Café Leblanc. Despite being a genius computer hacker, she is initially a hikikomori due to multiple traumatic experiences exacerbating her social anxiety; even after joining the Phantom Thieves, she is fearful of large crowds. Two years before the game's events, her mother, Wakaba Isshiki, was killed by a car, and she was framed for her death with a forged suicide note, resulting in her extended family shunning and verbally abusing her. After being bounced among family members, Sojiro intervened and took her in after her uncle Youji abused her as a proxy for Wakaba due to his jealousy over Wakaba's success. This severe trauma has caused her to suffer auditory hallucinations of her extended family's reactions to the suicide note and visual hallucinations of her mother staring at her disapprovingly. As a result, she has internalized her family's hatred of her and locked herself in her bedroom.

By the time of the game's events, Futaba has developed a Palace in the form of a pyramid, which, at first glance, represents sloth. However, its true sin is wrath, taking the form of its sole cognitive inhabitant: a Sphinx representing Futaba's warped and incorrect belief that her mother hated her. As the Phantom Thieves become more popular, Futaba blackmails them into changing her heart with the alias "Alibaba" after a supposed malevolent hacking group using her old alias "Medjed" targets them. Though she abandons the deal after realizing it requires meeting them in person, they approach her when Medjed continues to threaten them and, upon learning her plight, commit to the heist. Just before receiving the calling card, Futaba finds the Metaverse Navigator on her phone, and her Shadow appears before her and beckons her to enter her Palace. Her Shadow represents her repressed positive emotions and helps the Phantom Thieves traverse her Palace while she fights for control against the Sphinx, who takes over when she hallucinates. During the final heist, Futaba hallucinates after entering her Palace's keywords into the Nav, causing the Sphinx to manifest and attack the Phantom Thieves. After entering her Palace and discovering the truth about her mother's death, Futaba awakens her Persona and helps them defeat the Sphinx. After the fight, the Phantom Thieves discover that rather than having a Treasure, she was the Treasure, and that her Palace is collapsing quickly because she awakened a Persona. Like the cast of Persona 4, the strain of awakening a Persona debilitates Futaba for potentially several weeks, depending on how long before the deadline the player completed her Palace, and she spends much of the interim asleep. Her unique Change of Heart, a result of her taming her Shadow, prevents her from ending up in the Prison of Regression.

After preventing Medjed from throwing Japan into chaos and a week of the Thieves helping her to become more social, she officially joins them and replaces Morgana as the party's navigator. She later discovers that the Medjed who targeted the Phantom Thieves was a script kiddie loyal to a political conspiracy headed by Masayoshi Shido, who aims to use the Metaverse to turn Japan into a dictatorship. This same conspiracy was also responsible for murdering her mother to steal her cognitive psience research. She plays an instrumental role in the conspiracy's downfall by changing Shido's heart and hacking into several television networks to broadcast his calling card. She also confronts the Shadow of an IT company president, who turns out to have been the false Medjed.

Futaba's persona is Necronomicon, and she provides detailed locations and extra assistance in battle, without directly taking part in it. As a Confidant, Futaba represents the Hermit Arcana. After learning to adjust to a normal life, she makes a "promise list" of goals she wants to reach with the help of Joker. As she slowly recovers, she reveals that in her youth she was bullied for her intelligence and that her sole friend was Kana. Futaba discovers that Kana's parents were abusing her, and tracks her down only to learn that the abuse has continued. After changing her parents' hearts, Kana and Futaba rebuild their friendship. After completing her Confidant, Futaba's Persona evolves into Prometheus. In Persona 5 Royal, her Persona can evolve into Al Azif.

She is portrayed by Mei Fukuda beginning in Persona 5: The Stage #3. She appears in Super Smash Bros. Ultimate, and is featured in Joker's Final Smash, All-Out Attack, in addition to being a Spirit.

Haru Okumura (奥村 春, Okumura Haru)
Voiced by: Haruka Tomatsu (Japanese); Xanthe Huynh (English)
Haru, who as a Phantom Thief goes by the codename "Noir", is the heiress of Okumura Foods, owner of the Big Bang Burger restaurant chain. She first appears at the fireworks festival in July and, later, as a third-year chaperone on the school trip. When the Phantom Thieves first encounter her in the Metaverse, she is using the alias "Beauty Thief" (美少女怪盗, bishōjo kaitō) and allied with Morgana, who has temporarily left the Phantom Thieves. She becomes a member of the Phantom Thieves to escape a marriage arranged by her father, Kunikazu Okumura, realizing that he sees her as a tool to advance his business and political ambitions. However, after they change his heart, his Shadow is destroyed by Black Mask, resulting in a fatal mental shutdown, and the Phantom Thieves eventually discover that Shido-loyalists manipulated them into targeting him to engineer their downfall.

Haru's Persona is Milady, and she fights with grenade launchers and axes. As a Confidant, she represents the Empress Arcana and uses her gardening skills to grow SP healing items. (Note: SP stands for "Special Points", used for casting magic in the game.) After her father's death, Haru becomes Okumura Foods' largest shareholder, but many people in the business, including her fiancé Sugimura, attempt to wrest control from her. Company officials want to expand into coffee shops with cheap labor, but Haru wants a friendly, intimate atmosphere like her grandfather's shop. Over the course of conversations with Joker, she learns to stand up for herself; the company adopts her idea, and she breaks off her engagement with Sugimura. After completing her Confidant, Haru's Persona evolves into Astarte. In Persona 5 Royal, her Persona can evolve into Lucy.

She is portrayed by Riko Sugahara beginning in Persona 5: The Stage #3. She appears in Super Smash Bros. Ultimate as a Spirit and a background character on the Mementos stage.

Goro Akechi (明智 吾郎, Akechi Gorō)
Voiced by: Sōichirō Hoshi (Japanese); Robbie Daymond (English)
Goro is a popular teenage detective who has been given the title of "The Second Coming of the Detective Prince" (探偵王子の再来, Tantei ōji no sairai') by the media, and is known for his talent. Due to living in a series of abusive foster homes, he has become deeply contemptuous of society. He openly opposes the Phantom Thieves and becomes a rival to Joker. As a Confidant, he represents the Justice Arcana. During his Confidant, Akechi befriends Joker and admits his concerns about the Phantom Thieves' case and his past. He later joins the Thieves under the codename "Crow" after learning of their identities, and forces them to change Sae Nijima's heart to clear their names.

Akechi works for Masayoshi Shido as the "Black Mask" by exploiting the power of Metaverse and his Persona, but secretly plans to destroy his career and avenge his mother's suicide by revealing himself as his illegitimate son after he becomes prime minister. Because the Phantom Thieves are actively working against Shido, Akechi betrays them and attempts to assassinate Joker, partly out of jealousy. However, the Phantom Thieves are able to outsmart him by faking Joker's death through an intricate plot involving a clever use of the Metaverse Navigator, having figured out earlier that he could travel to the Metaverse, and covertly bugging his smartphone to find out who he was working for. After the Phantom Thieves defeat him in Shido's Palace, he sacrifices himself to save them after they are attacked by his cognitive self, created by Shido, who had his suspicions about Akechi's origins and thus planned to remove him as a loose end. In Persona 5 Royal, he becomes playable during the third semester, in which Maruki reveals to Joker that Akechi was brought back to reality out of Joker's wish to save him, and his survival depends on the choices the player made throughout the game.

Like Joker, Akechi is a Wild Card and can use several Personas simultaneously. However, his Wild Card ability is stagnant due to his lack of genuine human relations, meaning he only has two Personas – one representing his façade as a detective, and one representing his true colors. The Persona he uses as a member of the Phantom Thieves is Robin Hood; when he faces the party in his boss battle, he switches to Loki in the second half of the fight. In Persona 5 Royal, his Ultimate Persona is Hereward. With the Phantom Thieves, Akechi fights using laser sabers and ray guns; when he fights them after revealing his true colors, he uses a serrated sword and a silenced pistol.

He is portrayed by Yoshihide Sasaki in Persona 5: The Stage. He appears in Super Smash Bros. Ultimate as a Spirit, and Joker has a color scheme based on his Crow outfit.

Kasumi Yoshizawa (芳澤 かすみ, Yoshizawa Kasumi)
Voiced by: Sora Amamiya (Japanese); Laura Post (English)
Kasumi, who as a Phantom Thief goes by the codename "Violet", is introduced in Persona 5 Royal. She is a first-year student who transfers to Shujin Academy around the same time as Joker. She is a rhythmic gymnast whom the school has high hopes for because of her abilities. Although she has a good relationship with Joker and his friends, she has a negative opinion of the Phantom Thieves, saying their actions may lead people to rely on them too much instead of trying to solve their own problems. Despite this, she later joins them when a new Palace emerges. Eventually, she is revealed to be Kasumi's younger twin sister, Sumire Yoshizawa (芳澤 すみれ, Yoshizawa Sumire), whose memories were altered by Takuto Maruki to make her believe she is Kasumi after the real Kasumi died, pushing her out of the way of traffic.

Sumire's Persona is Cendrillon. In battle, she fights using rapiers, lever shotguns, and rifles. As a Confidant, she represents the Faith Arcana. At the beginning of her Confidant, she faces a slump in gymnastics, but after remembering who she is, Sumire learns to accept herself. Once her Confidant is maxed, her Persona transforms into Vanadis, and then into Ella.

Sophia (ソフィア, Sofia)
Voiced by: Misaki Kuno (Japanese); Megan Harvey (English)

Sophia, who assumes the codename "Sophie", is a character introduced in Persona 5 Strikers. Joker first finds her in a box in an underground section of the Shibuya Jail after he first enters the Shibuya Jail via EMMA, a virtual assistant app, by accident. She introduces herself as an Artificial Intelligence who has lost her memories, except for her name and her reason for existence: "to be humanity's companion". In the real world, she assists the Phantom Thieves as a virtual assistant, such as navigation. Throughout their adventure, she learns more about human emotions and begins forming a bond with Joker and the rest of the Phantom Thieves. She is later revealed to be EMMA's prototype and was given her first command by her creator, Kuon Ichinose: to be a good friend to all humans. However, she was deemed a failure. Ichinose then forces a command on her to betray the Phantom Thieves, but she resists the commands after recalling her memories with the Phantom Thieves and awakens her own Persona to fight back. After she and the Phantom Thieves defeat Demiurge and EMMA ceases to exist, she decides to accompany Ichinose on her journey and parts ways with the Phantom Thieves.

Sophia originally fought with the Persona-like entity Pithos, which later evolves into a full Persona called Pandora. Sophia represents the Hope Arcana. In battle, she fights using yo-yos and blasters. Outside of Jails, she resides in Joker's smartphone, since she does not have a physical body.

Zenkichi Hasegawa (長谷川 善吉, Hasegawa Zenkichi)
Voiced by: Shin-ichiro Miki (Japanese); Tom Taylorson (English)
Zenkichi, who assumes the codename "Wolf", is a character introduced in Persona 5 Strikers. He is a police officer from the Public Security Bureau who strikes a deal with the Phantom Thieves to find the mastermind behind the brainwashing events around Japan. He has a daughter, Akane, who has hated him ever since her mother, Aoi Hasegawa, died in a hit-and-run accident, and he was unable to arrest the person responsible. At first, he was content with solving the case and abandoning the Phantom Thieves, but after bonding with them during the cases and helping him reconcile with Akane, his attitude towards them changes. He also allows them to escape arrest when they are framed for murder in Okinawa and the hacking of the virtual assistant, EMMA, which causes him to be temporarily arrested. The Phantom Thieves, through Sae Niijima, allow him to be released from arrest and subsequently awaken his Persona when his daughter is manipulated to be a monarch for Kyoto's Jail.

Zenkichi's Persona is Valjean, based on the main character from Victor Hugo's novel Les Misérables. Zenkichi represents the Apostle Arcana. In battle, Zenkichi fights using a greatsword and dual revolvers.

== Antagonists ==
In Persona 5, some individuals have a distorted view of the world and the people around them. If this grows strong enough, they gain a Palace, a place in the Metaverse where their desires appear. There are eight Palaces that must be overcome, which each represent one of the seven deadly sins and have an owner with whom the main characters interact. To topple a Palace, not only its Ruler must be defeated, but its Treasure must be stolen; in real life, these Treasures represent the point where the Rulers' desires grew to distort their perceptions, thus stealing them leads to the changes of hearts. In Persona 5 Strikers, a character's corrupted Shadow Self is represented as a "Monarch" that rules over a "Jail" in the Metaverse as opposed to a Palace. Their distorted desires manifest from resentment towards certain people or previous trauma, and use the mobile application EMMA to artificially inflate their own ego by stealing the desires of civilians. Unlike Palace owners, Monarchs' Treasures are related to core traumatic memories, which the main characters view as catalysts for their corruption.

=== Persona 5 ===
Suguru Kamoshida (鴨志田 卓, Kamoshida Suguru)
Voiced by: Yuji Mitsuya (Japanese); D. C. Douglas (English)
Suguru is Shujin Academy's gym teacher and volleyball coach, who was previously a professional athlete and Olympic volleyball champion. Prior to the game's events, he provoked Ryuji into assaulting him to destroy the track team. He abuses and sexually assaults his students which Principal Kobayakawa ignores because of the volleyball team's fame and his status. Kamoshida targets Ann as his latest sexual conquest; when she rejects his advances, he forces himself on her best friend, Shiho Suzui, resulting in a traumatized and suicidal Shiho jumping off the school roof. When Joker, Ryuji, and Mishima confront him, he threatens to have the three of them expelled at the next school-board meeting. This incident convinces an enraged Joker and Ryuji, who were previously hesitant to resort to the Metaverse out of fear of unintentionally killing him, to change his heart. It also leads to Ann entering his Palace and awakening to her Persona.

Kamoshida's Palace represents lust and takes the form of a castle, where he sees himself as the king due to his power at Shujin Academy. The male members of the volleyball team are depicted as being subjected to torturous training, and the female team members and Ann are viewed as his sex slaves. After his Shadow is defeated, his Treasure (an ornate crown) manifests as his Olympic medal in reality. After his change of heart, Kamoshida surrenders to the police and confesses his crimes. Unlike most of the game's antagonists, Kamoshida is not part of its overall conspiracy, though he benefits through Antisocial Force member Principal Kobayakawa refusing to protect the students from him to avoid bringing attention to Shujin Academy. He is portrayed by Shun Takagi in Persona 5: The Stage.

Ichiryusai Madarame (斑目 一流斎, Madarame Ichiryūsai)
Voiced by: Yukitoshi Hori (Japanese); Kyle Hebert (English)
Ichiryusai is a well-known artist who secretly plagiarizes and profits from his students' work. After the death of Yusuke's mother, he took him in and let him live in his run-down shack, acting as his mentor. Yusuke admires him at first since he is the creator of his favorite painting, Sayuri, but later discovers that Madarame stole it from his mother and let her die from a seizure. Madarame then pretended that the painting was stolen from him to fraudulently sell copies of the original to private collectors. When Ann and Yusuke discover Madarame's plagiarism, he threatens to have them arrested for trespassing after his art exhibit is over, including Joker and Ryuji.

Madarame's Palace represents vanity and takes the form of a lavish art museum, where his students are depicted as portraits on display from which he can profit from. His Treasure is the original Sayuri painting, which depicts Yusuke's mother with her infant son in her arms; Madarame had painted over Yusuke to add mystery and appeal to the piece and make his claim as the painter more believable. The Sayuri is the least distorted Treasure seen on-screen; within the Metaverse, the only addition is an ornate frame, and the painting itself is unchanged. After his change of heart, he calls a press conference to admit his crimes and plagiarism. Yusuke later gives the original Sayuri to Sojiro Sakura to hang in Café Leblanc.

Junya Kaneshiro (金城 潤矢, Kaneshiro Jun'ya)
Voiced by: Kazunari Tanaka (Persona 5), Takahiro Fujimoto (Persona 5: The Animation onwards) (Japanese); Jalen K. Cassell (English)
Junya is a ruthless mafia boss responsible for enlisting students from Shujin Academy to smuggle drugs in Shibuya. Makoto, who Principal Kobayakawa tasked with investigating Kaneshiro, allows herself to be taken by the yakuza. When the Phantom Thieves try to rescue her, Kaneshiro blackmails them into paying him ¥3 million in three weeks and threatens to show photographs of them at a night club to their schools.

Kaneshiro's Palace represents gluttony and takes the form of a bank hovering above Shibuya, where people are viewed as walking automated teller machines from which he can drain money. His treasure appears as large gold bars in his Palace, manifesting in reality as a golden briefcase filled with fake money. After his change of heart, Kaneshiro deletes the photographs, voids the Phantom Thieves' debt, and surrenders to the police. He is portrayed by Yuya Miyashita in Persona 5: The Stage #2.

Principal Kobayakawa (校長, Kōchō)
Voiced by: Keiji Hirai (Japanese); Richard Epcar (English)
Koboyakawa is the hedonistic and apathetic principal of Shujin Academy, implied to have been given his position by Shido. He was responsible for employing Suguru Kamoshida to work as a gym teacher at Shujin Academy and turned a blind eye to what Kamoshida did to his students because Kamoshida's crimes coming to light would bring negative attention to Shujin Academy and potentially threaten to expose the Antisocial Force's existence, only for this to backfire disastrously when the Phantom Thieves change Kamoshida's heart. After Kamoshida confesses his crimes, Kobayakawa forces Makoto to investigate the Phantom Thieves' identities; however, he ends up alienating her by threatening her future and forcing her to deal with Kaneshiro to avoid crossing Shido, causing her to act unilaterally because she no longer trusts him and ultimately not disclose her discovery of their identities because she has joined the Phantom Thieves herself. When trying to get to the police force to expose the conspiracy, Kobayakawa suffers a mental shutdown caused by the Antisocial Force and gets hit by an approaching truck to keep him from exposing the Antisocial Force. His death caused the unnamed vice-principal to be sworn in as the new principal of Shujin Academy.

The name "Kobayakawa" only appears in the English translation; in the original Japanese version, he goes unnamed and is only referred to as "principal" (校長 kōchō).

Kunikazu Okumura (奥村 邦和, Okumura Kunikazu)
Voiced by: Hirohiko Kakegawa (Japanese); Christopher Corey Smith (English)
Kunikazu is the third president of Okumura Foods and Haru Okumura's father. Despite growing up in a financially struggling family, with his father in constant debt, Okumura transformed his family's small company into a multi-million-yen business and founded the popular Big Bang Burger fast-food chain. However, this growth came at the cost of completely disregarding employee welfare, causing Okumura Foods to become a black company under his leadership. Because he mistreats his employees, he quickly becomes the most popular suggested target on the Phantom Thieves' online poll, and his abhorrent treatment of Haru causes the Thieves to commit to targeting him.

Okumura was part of Masayoshi Shido's circle as a sponsor until he decided to enter politics himself. To achieve this ambition, he arranged a marriage between Haru and the abusive and domineering Sugimura, who is from a politically influential family. After Shido discovers this, he begins to see Okumura as a threat and orders him killed before the election. Using the Phantom Thieves as scapegoats, the conspiracy rigs the online poll to put him in their radar, then frame them for Okumura's murder. His Shadow is killed by Goro Akechi after the Phantom Thieves defeat him, resulting in him suffering a mental shutdown and dying during a live conference before he can reveal the names of those linked to Shido.

Okumura's Palace represents greed, and is depicted as a space station where his employees are robots that work in poor conditions and are incinerated upon breaking down. They are used as fuel for the spaceship being built to launch him into the political world. Haru herself is depicted in the Palace as her father's robotic secretary, devoid of any feeling and free will. His treasure is the core for his spaceship in his Palace, and manifests in reality as a spaceship model kit he had dreamed of owning as a child, but could not afford due to his family's financial woes.

He is portrayed by Hiroya Matsumoto in Persona 5: The Stage.

Masayoshi Shido (獅童 正義, Shidō Masayoshi)
Voiced by: Shuichi Ikeda (Japanese); Keith Silverstein (English)
Masayoshi is a politician and a representative in Japan's National Diet. Before the events of the game, he frames Joker for physical assault after he tries to prevent him from sexually assaulting a woman, resulting in Joker being placed on probation and expelled from school. He later appears as a candidate for prime minister, leading the United Future Party. To secure victory, he and his followers, including his illegitimate son, Akechi, steal Wakaba's research on "cognitive psience", while blocking access to it from other interested parties, like Takuto Maruki. They also use the Metaverse to cause mental shutdowns and psychotic breakdowns to eliminate potential threats and spread distrust for the current government administration. As the Phantom Thieves gain traction, he and his followers frame them for their crimes to bolster his own popularity among the general public. Under Yaldabaoth's influence, the public becomes convinced that not only is he the only viable candidate, but that he is a savior sent to usher in a golden age for Japan. However, those aware of his true colors realize that this "golden age" would be a corrupt administration, which would run the country into the ground and feed on the populace's suffering. Shido himself is indifferent as to whether or not Japan flourishes or declines, so long as he maintains a position of power and dominance over those he views as beneath him.

Shido's Palace represents pride and takes the form of a cruise ship sailing though a sunken Tokyo, upon which the Diet building is mounted, and where he and his conspirators live in luxury. Rather than cognitive beings, the Shadow selves of his conspirators also reside within the Palace, having been drawn to his strong personality and ego. His treasure is a golden ship's wheel in his Palace, manifesting as his legislator's pin in reality. After Shido's change of heart, he confesses his crimes in a press conference after his landslide victory. However, the cult of personality he benefited from is maintained by Yaldabaoth until the Phantom Thieves destroy Mementos. He is arrested at the end of the game, and Joker testifies against him at his trial.

Yaldabaoth (ヤルダバオト, Yarudabaoto)
Yaldabaoth, the God of Control, is a malevolent being that appears in the form of the Holy Grail: a Treasure of Mementos created from humanity's distorted sloth. He leads the conspiracy to give Masayoshi Shido political power and sponsored the Phantom Thieves to see which is stronger: their salvation of the world or Goro Akechi's desire to destroy and recreate it. He also imprisons Igor and impersonates him until Joker unmasks his identity. After Akechi and Shido are defeated, Yaldabaoth decides that the world should be "saved" by taking control of existence and removing everyone with chaos in their heart. He awakens his body in the core of Mementos, which merges with the physical world as his Palace. This gives him the ability to change lies into truth, driving people into despair and complacency and erasing his enemies.

He is described as the manifestation of humanity's desire for order and control, warped to the point where he no longer cares for the human cost or morality of that order. He is power-hungry, self-righteous and sadistic, and sees humans as little more than livestock and lemmings for him to rule, due to their self-destructiveness and stupidity. However, he does admit the existence of competent and talented humans, which he considers to be useful for him. He initially takes the form of the Holy Grail, which is black before the flow of wishes for him to dominate the world revitalizes him and turns the chalice gold. After the flow is cut off and the Grail is defeated, the chalice merges with his arena to become a giant, robotic, faceless angel who can manifest a gun, bell, sword, and book with each of his four arms. At the end of the fight, it is revealed that he could have easily defeated the Phantom Thieves with his power, but kept fighting them out of arrogance. After this fight, Yūki Mishima, one of the Phantom Thieves' allies, along with the rest of Joker's confidants, manages to convince the surviving civilians to support their fight, leading to the creation of the protagonist's ultimate Persona, Satanael. With Joker using the power of Satanael, Yaldabaoth is finally defeated and reverts to his original form of the Holy Grail, ending his ambitions and destroying Mementos for good. In Royal, however, his defeat allows Takuto Maruki to take his place as ruler of the Metaverse and enact his plan to rewrite reality and create a utopia.

=== Persona 5 Strikers ===
Alice Hiiragi (柊アリス, Hīragi Arisu)
Voiced by: Ayane Sakura (Japanese); Melanie Minichino (English)
Alice is introduced in Persona 5 Strikers. She is perceived by the public as a cute, charismatic pop idol that has left the city of Shibuya smitten with her adorable fashion sense. In reality, she manipulated her public self-image using the transformative effects of the mobile application known as EMMA, which is functionally similar to the Metaverse Navigator. She has also used her position of power to sadistically abuse and bully unknowing men in stable relationships by forcing a change of heart onto them, similarly to the Phantom Thieves of Hearts. Her Shadow Self appears as a dominatrix queen who portrays herself as a lustful and unforgiving temptress, in stark contrast to her innocent image in the real world.

After infiltrating her Trauma Cell, it is revealed to the Phantom Thieves that Alice was a former student at Shujin Academy, who developed depression and low self-esteem as a result of being bullied by popular girls following a failed confession attempt by a boy she knew. She was highly introverted prior to pursuing fashion, and used the EMMA app to seek revenge against other former Shujin students, who wanted to destroy her career and popularity by spreading insults and rumors about her past school life. EMMA also enabled her to cause the bullies to become addicted to her and change the hearts of bystanding men in Shibuya to become her submissive lovers. Her paranoia surrounding her past life is accentuated after meeting Ann Takamaki in the Metaverse for the first time, whom she views as no different from other popular, sociable girls she knew due to her nature as a highly attractive model. When she is defeated by the Phantom Thieves, her Shadow acknowledges that she didn't do anything to improve her self-image on her own, and was wrong to follow the examples of those who tormented her.

Ango Natsume (夏芽 安吾, Natsume Ango)
Voiced by: Daisuke Kishio (Japanese); Zach Aguilar (English)
Ango is an author in Sendai best known for his novel Prince of Nightmares, which has sold over 1 million copies and won a literary award, but in reality heavily plagiarizes various other works. In addition, Natsume is using the EMMA app to steal the desires of the populace, resulting in his fans buying several copies of Prince of Nightmares with loaned money, defacing the Date Masamune statue with promotional posters, and attacking any who criticize Natsume or accuse him of plagiarism. His Shadow Self takes the form of the main protagonist of his book, who is standing behind a cardboard cutout to appear imposing, but in reality wears nothing but a pair of red underwear.

After the Phantom Thieves infiltrate his Trauma Cell, they discover that he overheard his publishers insult him and discuss jury-rigging the literary award so that his book would win, allowing them to sell his book on the reputation of his grandfather, an award-winning novelist. Natsume then used the EMMA app to place his publishers under his control as revenge for their plans to manipulate him. After being defeated by the Phantom Thieves, his Shadow Self admits that he was wrong to plagiarize other works and manipulate the hearts of other. In the real world, Natsume admits to his plagiarism and promises full refunds to those who bought his book, and the plot by his publishers to manipulate him is revealed to the public. Yusuke Kitagawa encourages him to continue pursuing his dream without relying on the works of others for success, and Natsume vows to write his next novel using his own ideas.

Mariko Hyodo (氷堂 鞠子, Hyōdo Marikō)
Voiced by: Kyoko Terase (Japanese); Kim Rhodes (English)
Mariko is the mayor of Sapporo running for reelection during the events of the game, and is an old family friend of Haru. She uses EMMA to brainwash the people of Sapporo into voting for her and interfering with rival campaigns. When the Phantom Thieves enter her Jail, they find a desolate city covered in ice and snow, and are later forced to leave due to a routine city cleanup causing a "hee-horde" of Jack Frosts to swarm the Jail. She has also become cruel to her city employees; the Phantom Thieves first encounter her berating one for letting a flower wilt, and later have to force her to let a sick man take time off to recover. Her Shadow Self is vastly different from her self in reality, appearing as a morbidly obese snow queen with pale skin.

After the Phantom Thieves infiltrate her Trauma Cell, they discover that a city employee planned to blame her for a poorly built snow sculpture collapsing and fatally crushing a nine-year-old girl even though his own corruption resulted in the tragedy. This led to her becoming terrified of scandal and obsessed with keeping the city "spotless", resulting in her cold behavior towards city employees and her decision to use the EMMA app to rig the election and inflate her own power. After her Shadow Self is defeated, she apologizes for her recent behavior and the snow sculpture collapse and decides to step down as mayor and withdraw from the race, but is convinced to remain at the behest of the deceased girl's mother.

Shuzo Ubukata (生方 収臓, Ubukata Shūzō)
Shuzo Ubukata was an artificial intelligence genius from Okinawa hired by Akira Konoe to aid in EMMA's development as part of "Operation Oraculi". The Phantom Thieves never encounter his Shadow because he is deceased by the time of the game's events. Ubukata's research resulted in the development of the first Jail, and he brainwashed much of Okinawa's population into considering the lab he worked in "hallowed ground", leading to them hunting down and murdering anyone who makes the mistake of approaching the lab.

The experiment sent him into an increasingly delusional and power-hungry state, and he refused to accept that the "Penitentiary System" was intended to subjugate, not save, humanity until Konoe simulated a calling card by demanding he surrender the desires he had collected. Faced with being brainwashed, he chose to commit suicide by jumping off a cliff. Despite becoming dormant due to the lack of a Monarch, the Jail's hold on the people of Okinawa remains unbroken until the Phantom Thieves are forced to explore it and manage to return the desires to them. Former Shido-loyalists Konoe is using as pawns later attempt to frame the Phantom Thieves for his death, but Sae Niijima intervenes and gets the charges dropped.

Akane Hasegawa (長谷川 茜, Hasegawa Akane)
Voiced by: Naomi Ōzora (Japanese); Colleen O'Shaughnessey (English)
Akane is Zenkichi Hasegawa's estranged daughter, who despises him because he was unable to bring her mother's killer to justice, and the tragedy forced her to move to Kyoto, resulting in her losing her friends. Ever since the move, she has largely become a shut-in. Her resentment of authority led to her becoming enamored with the Phantom Thieves when they became popular, and she has a large amount of Phantom Thieves merchandise and frequently broadcasts a Phantom Thieves-themed livestream.

The Phantom Thieves first learn of her when they are travelling to Kyoto, when she calls Zenkichi at an inopportune time, overhears the girls, and wrongly assumes that Zenkichi is ditching a visit to her mother's grave to party. The Phantom Thieves take it upon themselves to intervene and explain the situation, and, hearing of her home life, decide to stay with the Hasegawas prior to moving on to Okinawa, and end up bonding with her.

When Zenkichi protects the Phantom Thieves from arrest and ends up arrested as a result, the Hasegawa residence is raided, resulting in Akane becoming vulnerable to EMMA's manipulations and becoming a Monarch. She is manipulated by EMMA into capturing the Phantom Thieves in her Jail, with Futaba only escaping because her poor stamina causes her to lag behind. Zenkichi infiltrates Akane's Jail to rescue the Phantom Thieves, awakening a Persona in the process, and joins the Phantom Thieves in freeing her from EMMA's influence. Rather than Shadow Akane herself, the Phantom Thieves are forced to fight cognitive versions of themselves, based on her inaccurate interpretation of them from Shido's calling card.

After Akane is freed from EMMA's influence, she reconciles with Zenkichi, who is in a panic since he did not realize that Akane's Shadow was not the real her until after her heart was changed. Zenkichi is furious that his daughter was dragged into Konoe's scheme, and is especially fervent in stopping Konoe after that point.

Akira Konoe (近衛 明, Konoe Akira)
Voiced by: Tōru Ōkawa (Japanese); George Ackles (English)
Konoe is the CEO of the Osaka-based Maddice Corporation, which holds the distribution rights to EMMA as a mobile app. He uses EMMA out of a misguided belief of bringing justice to the world, stemming from an incident in his childhood in which he killed his abusive father in self-defense: as his father was an influential businessman, he was never punished for the abuse he dished out on his wife and son, even as he murdered her, because his connections allowed him to get away with it every time. The hopelessness of his home situation, combined with his admiration of tokusatsu hero Zephyrman, became the catalyst behind his actions and the creation of the Jail system, to the point that his Shadow self is modeled after Zephyrman, as he earnestly believes himself to be a hero of justice.

Kuon Ichinose sold Konoe the code to EMMA so that he could help it achieve its goal of figuring out humanity's ultimate desire for happiness. To that end, Konoe develops EMMA further into a virtual assistant, while at the same time hiring Ubukata to study its potential for his own personal objective of "saving" people, which entails robbing them of their desires as they enter a state of bliss. He also has the financial backing of politician Jyun Owada, whom Konoe personally despises and wishes to have arrested once he is of no more use to him (in fact, another reason for Konoe's acquisition of EMMA was to prevent its misuse by Masayoshi Shido or any of his patsies, like Owada).

After the Phantom Thieves are framed for Ubukata's suicide, Konoe has EMMA mount a trap to capture them by turning a close ally to them into a Jail Monarch; EMMA ends up choosing Akane without his knowledge, which leads Zenkichi and the Thieves to gun straight for him once Akane's heart is changed. Despite being a tough opponent due to his convictions, once Konoe learns about Akane, he loses the will to fight and agrees to turn himself in, horrified to have dragged a child into his scheme.

Jyun Owada (大和田 純, Ōwada Jun)
Voiced by: Ikuya Sawaki (Japanese); Andrew Morgado (English)
Jyun Owada is a politician who was loyal to Masayoshi Shido and, as a result, was protected from penalties for a drunk drive that caused Aoi Hasegawa's death. Aoi's widower Zenkichi began to uncover his crime, but was forced to end his investigation when Owada threatened their daughter Akane. He survived Shido's downfall and plans to succeed Shido by colluding with Akira Konoe. However, he is not a Monarch and as such is merely a pawn of Konoe, who plans to bring him to justice after his usefulness comes to an end.

Owada organizes the attempt to frame the Phantom Thieves for "murdering" Shuzo Ubukata, but his cronies botch the arrest warrant, and Sae is able to get it thrown out. After Konoe is defeated, Owada finds that his allies were only loyal because Konoe had stolen their desires. He is arrested afterwards for various crimes, including his manslaughter of Aoi.

Kuon Ichinose (一ノ瀬 久音, Ichinose Kuon)
Voiced by: Yōko Hikasa (Japanese); Kira Buckland (English)
An AI expert and the original creator of Sophia and EMMA. The main reason behind the creation of the AIs was to understand the human heart, as since her youth she has had difficulty in connecting with people. Her inability to properly mourn her parents' sudden death only exacerbated this feeling further, as people alienated themselves from her believing her to be "heartless". This led Ichinose to throw herself into her studies to create an AI who could explain to her what a "heart" was; her first experiment, Sophia, was deemed a failure and discarded because she threw the question back at her creator, triggering her childhood trauma as she herself did not have the answer. Because of this, she has an intense hatred of Sophia.

Going back to the drawing board, Ichinose removed the emotional component from the equation to create EMMA. She later sells it to Maddice, actively conspiring with Konoe's plans so that EMMA will keep learning about the human heart, eventually leading into it becoming the Demiurge. Unwilling to allow the Phantom Thieves to interfere, she attempts to turn Sophia against them, only for Sophia to achieve total self-awareness thanks to her bonds with the team and fully awaken to her Persona. Once she is defeated, Sophia chooses to spare and forgive her creator, causing her to break down in tears for the first time in her life, eventually realize the error of her ways. She later decides to help the Phantom Thieves defeat her other creation, seeing it turn Tokyo into its own Jail where people are blissful, empty shells devoid of their desires.

After EMMA is purged, Ichinose attempts to turn herself in to the authorities, but is let off because of her story being deemed too outrageous. She then decides to start anew, leaving on a journey with Sophia to truly understand the human heart.

EMMA
Voiced by: Misa Watanabe (Japanese); Susan Bennett (English)
The second attempt at an AI created to understand the human heart by Kuon Ichinose, EMMA starts out as a virtual assistant app with extremely accurate decision-making capabilities, making it convenient and popular across Japan. In reality, EMMA uses the data fed into it in an attempt to conclude what is the best course for humanity to achieve true happiness.

After Sophia was discarded by Ichinose due to her own curiosity about the heart, EMMA was created as a substitute, devoid of any emotions. It was later acquired by Maddice as a blank slate, so that Konoe could help fill it with his own experiences, leading to the creation of "Operation Oraculi" and the Jail system. As it grows in influence, EMMA eventually learns that, for humanity to achieve ultimate happiness, it must be free from its desires; thus, it grows beyond its programming, reactivating itself after its shutdown following Konoe's arrest and the closure of Maddice and turning the entire city of Yokohama into a self-governed Jail.

After Sophia and the Phantom Thieves make Ichinose realize the error of her ways, EMMA flees to Tokyo and creates a Garden of Eden-inspired Jail on the Tokyo Tower, called the Tree of Knowledge, from which it rules calling itself the Demiurge, the final boss of Persona 5 Strikers. There, it explains that its vision for humanity's greatest desire is to rid it from all pain and suffering, seeing itself as a god who will grant this desire since people would not do this by themselves, having been overly reliant on EMMA to make their decisions. With Ichinose's help, the Phantom Thieves eventually manage to defeat the Demiurge, shutting EMMA down for good.

== Confidants ==
Like previous Persona games, progression of the characters' skills is based on their level of bonding with non-player characters. Persona 5 has Confidants (コープ, kōpu; lit. "Coop" in the Japanese release, short for "Cooperation"), replacing Persona 3 and Persona 4's "Social Links". Each Confidant represents a tarot Arcana (suit), based on their disposition and problems. Spending time with a Confidant allows characters to advance personas of the same Arcana, gain extra skills, and fuse the strongest persona of that Arcana.

Sae Niijima (新島 冴, Niijima Sae)
Voiced by: Yūko Kaida (Japanese); Elizabeth Maxwell (English)
Sae is a prosecutor for the Tokyo District Special Investigation Department and legal guardian of her sister, Makoto. Although Sae cares for Makoto and helps her succeed, she sees her sister as a burden who takes away from her what little enjoyment is left in life after their father, a police officer, was killed in the line of duty. In her disillusionment with the Japanese judicial system, Sae develops a Palace representing envy in the form of a rigged casino where she always wins. She is assigned to the Phantom Thieves case, and becomes fixated on them. Due to the heist taking place in the midst of a ruse intended to counter another ruse, her Treasure is not stolen; her heart is instead changed through a combination of Makoto reasoning with her Shadow and her interrogation of Joker in the aftermath of the "failed" heist, preventing her from ending up in the Prison of Regression. Since a briefcase was used as a decoy Treasure to leave Akechi unaware that the Phantom Thieves had discovered his true colors, it is unknown what form the Treasure took within the Metaverse; however, Makoto suspects that it would have manifested in reality as their father's police notebook, and the unformed Treasure has a silhouette of a notebook within.

As a Confidant, Sae represents the Judgment Arcana. During the game, she interrogates Joker about the Phantom Thieves following his arrest. Although Sae is tasked to prosecute the Phantom Thieves, she believes Joker's story and helps him escape. As the interrogation is a frame story and the rank 10 requirements progress the story beyond November 20, this Confidant is technically completed in a single day – one where Joker has no access to the Velvet Room – and therefore has no effect on gameplay, not even Arcana Burst, until it is maxed out. When she completes her Confidant she decides to help out the Phantom Thieves, and ultimately quits being a prosecutor to become a criminal defense lawyer. She is portrayed by Kaoru Marimura in Persona 5: The Stage.

Sojiro Sakura (佐倉 惣治郎, Sakura Sōjirō)
Voiced by: Jouji Nakata (Japanese); Jamieson Price (English)
Sojiro is the owner of Café Leblanc in Yongen-Jaya and Ren's guardian during his probation. Despite originally being cold toward Ren in the beginning of the game, Sojiro eventually warms up to him over time. He teaches Ren about coffee and curry when he works at the café. Ren and the Phantoms later learns that Sojiro is Futaba's legal guardian, who adopted her after her mother Wakaba's death, mainly to atone for not saving Wakaba and to protect Futaba from her abusive uncle, Youji Isshiki.

Sojiro was also revealed to have been a former government official who was in love with Wakaba. He left the government sector to work at the café shortly after her death, and suspected Masayoshi Shido's involvement in her death, having known of him and his ambitions since he was a small-time politician. Sojiro learns that Ren and his friends are the Phantom Thieves after he discovers the calling card they gave Futaba, and, realizing they saved Futaba's life, lets them use Café Leblanc as their headquarters.

As a Confidant, Sojiro represents the Hierophant Arcana, through which the coffee and curry Ren learns to make gain HP and SP healing properties, respectively. During his Confidant, he is constantly harassed and extorted by Youji. Futaba wants to defend Sojiro, but his coldness towards her causes them to argue. Ren helps Sojiro and Futaba reconcile; Sojiro asks Futaba to stay with him, and thanks Joker for reminding him not to take the easy path in life. He is portrayed by Eiji Moriyama in Persona 5: The Stage.

Lavenza (ラヴェンツァ, Raventsa)
Voiced by: Aki Toyosaki (Japanese); Carrie Keranen (English)
Caroline (カロリーヌ, Karorīnu) and Justine (ジュスティーヌ, Jusutīnu) are twin prison wardens in the Velvet Room, who replace Elizabeth and Margaret from the previous two games as Igor's assistants. Caroline is the "bad cop", with a short temper and a general dislike of Joker; she guards the entrances to the Velvet Room in Tokyo, and kicks Joker inside when he enters. Justine plays the "good cop" and manages the Persona Compendium, a list of the Personas Joker has owned. Despite being calmer than Caroline, she still treats Joker as a prisoner and guards the entrances to the Velvet Room in Mementos and in Palaces.

Caroline and Justine represent the Strength Arcana, and encourage Joker to fuse certain Personas with skills. When he fails to stop the Holy Grail, they remember that Yaldabaoth had captured Igor and that they were once one being, who he split in two to prevent them from acting. They fuse into Lavenza, their true form; she calls Joker "Trickster" instead of "inmate." Caroline & Justine appear in Super Smash Bros. Ultimate as a Spirit.

Igor (イゴール, Igōru)
Voiced by: Masane Tsukayama (False Igor), Isamu Tanonaka (Real Igor, archived recordings) (Japanese); David Lodge (False Igor), Kirk Thornton (Real Igor) (English)
Igor is the prison master of the Velvet Room. As a Confidant he represents the Fool Arcana, allowing Joker to have multiple Personas simultaneously. When Joker fails to stop the Holy Grail, Igor declares his rehabilitation a failure and reveals himself as Yaldabaoth in disguise. The real Igor, who has been held captive for the entirety of the story, is freed and helps Joker defeat Yaldabaoth, providing the same services. Igor appears in Super Smash Bros. Ultimate as a Spirit.

Tae Takemi (武見 妙, Takemi Tae)
Voiced by: Yuka Saitō (Japanese); Kirsten Potter (Persona 5), Abby Trott (Persona 5 Royal and Persona 5: The Animation) (English)
Tae owns the Takemi Medical Clinic in Yongen-Jaya. She is nicknamed "the Black Death" because she was blamed for not being able to save one of her patients. The protagonist helps her by participating in clinical trials to test her new medications, which she hopes will boost her credibility. Artist Shigenori Soejima said that he originally designed her as "extremely unapproachable, with the eyes of a killer", but softened her appearance at Hashino's request.

As a Confidant, Takemi represents the Death Arcana and allows Joker to buy healing supplies from her pharmacy, unlocking discounts as the Confidant progresses. As Joker participates in more of her trials, he learns that Takemi had worked for a university and was fired after being blamed for a disastrous medical trial she had opposed. She becomes more motivated after treating a young patient with a similar illness, and when Joker changes the heart of her former colleague, she saves a former patient's life and regains her reputation.

Munehisa Iwai (岩井 宗久, Iwai Munehisa)
Voiced by: Hisao Egawa (Japanese); Kaiji Tang (English)
Munehisa is a former yakuza who owns an airsoft shop, Untouchable, in Shibuya. In the Metaverse, fake guns and weapons are as effective as the real thing, so Joker frequently visits Untouchable to supply the Phantom Thieves with equipment. Iwai has an adopted son, Kaoru, whose mother abandoned him when she could not sell him for drug money. Unable to bring himself to tell Kaoru about his ties to the yakuza, Iwai instead told him that he was a family friend who took him in after his parents died in a car accident.

Iwai represents the Hanged Man Arcana, allowing Joker to customize his team's firearms for different combat effects. In his Confidant, Joker acts as a lookout for Iwai and helps him with a deal involving his yakuza brother Tsuda, who has been forcing him to illegally customize guns. He is also attempting to save face within his organization after a weapons deal he made with the Hong Kong Triads fell through. The deal becomes fraught when Tsuda threatens Joker and Iwai's lives. After the Phantom Thieves change his heart, he repents, admitting that he thought he was losing his place in the organization to younger members. Another yakuza, Masa, tries to take advantage of Tsuda abandoning the deal, and threatens to kill Kaoru and reveals the truth regarding his parents. Iwai acknowledges Kaoru as his son, and Tsuda takes Masa into custody.

Yuuki Mishima (三島 由輝, Mishima Yūki)
Voiced by: Daisuke Sakaguchi (Japanese); Sean Chiplock (English)
Yuuki is a classmate of Joker and Ann and member of the volleyball club. He is a frequent target of Kamoshida's abuse, and was forced to leak Joker's criminal records on the internet, leading to Joker being ostracized by the student body from the moment he started attending Shujin Academy. He also summoned Shiho Suzui to Kamoshida's office, leading to a sexual assault and Shiho's suicide attempt; Kamoshida nearly expels him for confronting him with Joker and Ryuji. After Kamoshida's arrest, he realizes that Joker, Ryuji, and Ann are the Phantom Thieves. He creates and manages the Phantom Aficionados website, a fan site dedicated to the Thieves with a message board where people post requests for changes of heart. Mishima periodically sends these requests to Joker to enhance the Thieves' reputation.

As a Confidant, Mishima represents the Moon Arcana and will give party members experience points, even if they do not participate actively in battle, in tandem with the "Phan-Site" requests. His fascination with the Phantom Thieves becomes an obsession, and Joker deduces that his motivation to help springs from insecurity and his desire for popularity. When Mishima runs into his bully from middle school, he threatens to have his heart changed. After Joker confronts his Shadow in Mementos, Mishima realizes the error of his ways and saves his bully from thugs.

He is portrayed by Taishu Nukanobu in Persona 5: The Stage and Stage #2 and Shogo Tamura in Stage #3.

Sadayo Kawakami (川上 貞代, Kawakami Sadayo)
Voiced by: Mai Fuchigami (Japanese); Michelle Ruff (English)
Sadayo is Class 2-D's Japanese-language teacher and the homeroom teacher in Joker and Ann's class. Kawakami avoids Joker until he learns that she took up a job as a maid to pay the guardians of Taiki Takase, a student from the previous school she worked at. Takase worked several part-time jobs to support his guardians' hedonistic lifestyle, and as a result frequently missed school and received low grades. When Kawakami began tutoring him, Principal Kobayakawa ordered her to stop or resign because of Takase's rumored delinquency. Takase was killed in a car accident shortly afterwards, and his guardians use his death to extort money from Kawakami, threatening to sue her if she does not comply.

As a Confidant, Kawakami represents the Temperance Arcana. She helps Joker with chores and gives him free time in class. Initially saying that it pays her sister's medical bills, Kawakami's second job allows her no time to rest and she is hospitalized with exhaustion. When Joker changes the hearts of Takase's guardians, she quits her second job and resolves to be a better teacher.

She is portrayed by Sawa Minami in Persona 5: The Stage.

Toranosuke Yoshida (吉田 寅之助, Yoshida Toranosuke)
Voiced by: Keiichi Noda (Japanese); William Salyers (English)
Toranosuke is an independent politician and public speaker who has lost seven consecutive elections. He attempts to overcome a bad reputation and his nickname of "No-Good Tora" after committing several political blunders early in his career, including accusations of embezzling party funds.

As a Confidant, Yoshida represents the Sun Arcana, which facilitates negotiations with obtainable Personas. The player can volunteer to aid his public speaking to build up his Confidant, during which it is revealed that his old mentor was responsible for the scandal which destroyed his credibility, as they misappropriated the funds and used Yoshida as a scapegoat. By the end of the Confidant, Yoshida has won a sizable base for his upcoming campaign and the culprit behind the scandal is revealed, allowing him to confront his problems head-on. During the general election, despite Shido's party winning in a landslide victory, Yoshida's popular support allows him to finally be elected to the Diet.

Ichiko Ohya (大宅 一子, Ōya Ichiko)
Voiced by: Yumi Uchiyama (Japanese); Amanda Winn-Lee (English)
Ichiko is a reporter and paparazza in her mid-20s who will write whatever story sells and sometimes manipulates information in her articles for clickbait. She was once a more-stringent journalist, but her story exposing the scandal of Masayoshi Shido's cohort was censored and she was reassigned to entertainment. Her partner, a photographer named Kayo Murakami, disappeared and was framed.

As a Confidant, Ohya represents the Devil Arcana, which allows the Phantom Thieves to infiltrate Palaces at lower security levels. The protagonist leaks information about the Phantom Thieves to the media, allowing Ohya to unearth information about her demotion. She is forced to act as Joker's girlfriend to hide from her bosses that she is working to overcome them. She frequents Shinjuku's Crossroads Bar, where she is friends with drag queen bartender Lala Escargot.

Chihaya Mifune (御船 千早, Mifune Chihaya)
Voiced by: Miyu Matsuki (Persona 5), Haruka Terui (Persona 5: The Animation onwards) (Japanese); Sarah Anne Williams (English)
Chihaya is a fortune-teller from the countryside with a stand in Shinjuku, who speaks in her original dialect when flustered. Despite being part of a con-artist group, her clairvoyance is genuine. She moved to Tokyo after being ostracized by her hometown and accused of witchcraft due to her clairvoyance.

As a Confidant, Chihaya represents the Fortune Arcana and can boost Joker's social statistics and relationships with his other Confidants. She scams Joker out of ¥100,000 to buy a Holy Stone, which turns out to be rock salt. When he confronts her and changes the heart of someone who is bothering one of her clients, she has him accompany her during her readings because she believes that he can change fate. Her employer, the Assembly of Divine Power, a group of New Age con artists, force her to sell fake Holy Stones; she persists, since her readings say that she cannot escape. After Joker changes the Assembly leader's heart so that he will release Chihaya from her contract, he convinces her that the future can be changed and that her actions shape her destiny.

Hifumi Togo (東郷 一二三, Tōgō Hifumi)
Voiced by: Tomomi Isomura (Japanese); Eden Riegel (English)
Hifumi is a champion shogi player from Kosei High School who is often found at the church in Kanda at night. She wishes to become a professional player like her ailing father, who taught her how to play shogi. Her mother encourages her media appearances, and promotes her Japanese idol work, when she would rather be praised for her shogi skills. Early in the game's development, Hifumi was conceived as a member of the Phantom Thieves, acting as a more radical strategist in contrast to Makoto's straightforward approach, but she was eventually reduced to a Confidant, leaving Makoto with both traits.

As a Confidant, Hifumi represents the Star Arcana and teaches Joker tactical skills, such as switching members from the party during battle, with shogi. Hifumi discovers that her mother has been rigging shogi matches in her favor, while attempting to force her to quit the game and focus solely on being an idol so she can live her dream through her daughter. After Joker changes her mother's heart, Hifumi loses a shogi tournament and is called the "Phony Princess" by the media. Despite this, she is happy to be her real self and vows to continue pursuing her dream to play professionally while rebuilding her reputation as an honest player.

Shinya Oda (織田 信也, Oda Shinya)
Voiced by: Aki Kanada (Japanese); Barbara Goodson (English)
Shinya is an elementary-school student who hangs out at the Gigolo Arcade in Akihabara. He is known as the King because of his top score in the shoot 'em up arcade game, Gun About. Shinya idolizes the Phantom Thieves, and Joker asks him for his help in defeating a cheating gamer in Mementos.

As a Confidant, Shinya represents the Tower Arcana and teaches Joker gun moves in Gun About, which Joker uses in the Metaverse. Despite his popularity at the arcade, he is swept up in a prank war with his classmates and vows to win, an aggressive trait learned from his mother, Hanae. When his classmates accuse him of bullying, he questions himself and becomes concerned when he realizes that his mother has become more unreasonable, arguing with his school concerning his education. After Hanae sees Shinya hanging out with Joker, she accuses the latter of being a bad influence to her son and threatens to report him to the police. After Joker changes her heart, Shinya makes amends with his classmates.

Takuto Maruki (丸喜 拓人, Maruki Takuto)
Voiced by: Satoshi Hino (Japanese); Billy Kametz (English)
Takuto is a character introduced in Persona 5 Royal who represents the Councillor Arcana, an Arcana newly introduced for Royal which gives Joker a number of passive buff and recovery skills. He is a new guidance counselor who arrives at Shujin Academy after Kamoshida's arrest. Contrary to Kasumi, he has a positive opinion of the Phantom Thieves, as he thinks their actions can bring happiness and justice to people. It is later revealed he was one of the original researchers of Cognitive Psience, having studied it since his college days, and is hoping to validate his research during his tenure at Shujin. After his fiancé Rumi lost her parents in a violent crime and entered a state of catatonic depression, he awoke to a Persona with the ability to alter the cognitions of others, altering their personalities and memories. Maruki unintentionally used his powers for the first time on Rumi, changing her cognition so that she no longer suffered from the trauma of her parents' deaths, but erasing her memory of him in the process. He would continue using his powers to alter the cognitions of patients that had suffered from similarly severe trauma, such as Sumire Yoshizawa, whose cognition he changed to make her believe she was her deceased sister, Kasumi.

If the protagonist maxed out his Confidant before the end of his tenure at Shujin, then during the conflict with Yaldabaoth, he will present his finished Cognitive Psience paper to his old professor out of spite. The funding for his dream of opening a lab in Odaiba was supposedly cut off due to a lack of "concrete evidence". In reality, Shido pulled some strings to shut down the funding and stole Maruki's research, like he did with Futaba's mother. During an argument with his old professor, Maruki becomes vulnerable to the distortion caused by Yaldabaoth merging Mementos with the real world, causing his Persona to manifest incompletely and in a berserk state as Azathoth, rather than Adam Kadmon. As a result, he enters a delusional state where he believes the only way to improve the world is to use his abilities on everyone to create a utopia, becoming the final antagonist of Royal. Despite possessing a Persona, Maruki manifests a Palace in the Metaverse at the same time, something Morgana notes should be impossible. His Palace represents sorrow and takes the form of a research facility on the site in Odaiba where his lab was to be built before his funding was cut, where people are brainwashed into feeling nothing but happiness before ascending to his perceived utopia. His Treasure appears as a torch in the Metaverse, symbolizing his desire to guide humanity, which manifests in reality as a newspaper clipping detailing the murder of Rumi's parents.

In the new bad/neutral ending, Joker allows Maruki to warp reality to grant humanity their desires, and he is last seen taking a group picture of the Phantom Thieves. In the true ending, Maruki is defeated by the Phantom Thieves and realizes the error of his ways, and that he must face life's hardships head on instead of running away from them. He reforms, becomes a taxi driver, and offers Joker a ride as he is being followed by officers. Maruki tells Joker that he will move forward in his life, just like how Joker and his friends will do the same.

== Reception ==
The game's characters were generally well received. According to Simon Miller of trustedreviews.com, "The cast of characters only gets better as the game progresses." The Verge also praised the cast: "Persona 5 has a memorable and lovable cast of characters ... the story is buoyed by a great cast of characters, who – in typical Persona fashion – start out as forgettable teenage archetypes, before revealing themselves to be layered, lovable individuals."

GamesRadar+ praised the characters and the new Confidants: "Every aspect of the game's narrative is outstanding, including the many ancillary folks that you can make into 'confidants'". Eurogamer enjoyed the characters' exchanges of surreptitious text messages, but objected to the game's gender ethics: "Persona 5 continues the franchise's awkward relationship with queer-coded people". In The Independent, a reviewer called the characters "fantastic".

GameSpew also noted the characters: "Yet as with any Persona game, its biggest selling point is how the game explores such ideas through its colourful cast of characters." According to a Kotaku review, "If you're looking for an RPG with a great story and characters it may be a huge disappointment." However, Amanda Yeo of Kotaku enjoyed the game and its characters: "Persona 5 taught me how to be a friend." A Polygon reviewer liked the game's characters overall, but disliked the portrayal of homosexual characters: "Essentially, some of Persona 5's only examples of queer characterization are there as a terrible joke."
