= Morgana (Persona) =

Persona 5 character

- Persona character
- Morgana in Persona 5
- First game: Persona 5 (2016)
- Designed by: Shigenori Soejima
- Voiced by: EN: Cassandra Lee Morris; JA: Ikue Ōtani

Morgana (モルガナ, Morugana) is a character in the 2016 video game Persona 5. He is an anthropomorphic cat who claims to be human, having this form in a world called the Metaverse and a normal cat form in the real world. He assists the protagonist, Joker as a member of the Phantom Thieves of Hearts, with his goal being to collect treasures in various places called "Palaces" in the Metaverse and recover his memory. He also adopts the Phantom Thief code name Mona (モナ). Morgana was designed by Shigenori Soejima, and was voiced by Ikue Ōtani in Japanese and Cassandra Lee Morris in English.

Morgana's tendency to prevent the player from doing things at night has become a meme, also causing players to express frustration with Morgana. He became less persistent about the player doing things at night in Persona 5 Royal, which was met with positive reception. Morris read the book "Go the Fuck to Sleep" in Morgana's voice in reference to this.

== Concept and creation ==
Morgana was created for Persona 5 by Shigenori Soejima. Morgana has two main forms: in the real world, he resembles a normal black and white cat; in the Metaverse, Morgana is anthropomorphic, featuring cat-like features, large blue eyes, black-and-white fur, and a black outfit with a utility belt, scarf, and mask. He was originally going to have a more feminine design, featuring "wide hips, breasts, and a leather catsuit". Additionally, Morgana had "hypnotic swirls" for eyes and could turn into anything, not just a bus.

== Appearances ==
Morgana first appears in Persona 5, having been locked in a cell while breaking into a castle in a world called the Metaverse to steal a king's treasure. He is later freed by protagonist Joker and his ally Ryuji Sakamoto, and meets them in the real world afterward as a normal cat that they could understand due to them having been to the Metaverse before. He also reveals that he cannot remember who he was, though rebuffs any claims that he is a cat, arguing that he is actually a human. The three, alongside a girl named Ann Takamaki, team up to defeat Shadow Kamoshida, a manifestation of a real man named Suguru Kamoshida who had been abusing students. After stealing this treasure and "stealing the heart" of Shadow Kamoshida to cause him to stop his ways in the real world, they proceeded to establish a thief group called the Phantom Thieves, gaining more allies, including Yusuke Kitagawa, and Makoto Niijima while stealing the hearts of other bad people. He briefly leaves the Phantom Thieves after becoming insecure about his role, allying with a girl named Haru Okumura and eventually rejoining after they made up. The group eventually make their way to Mementos, the incarnation of the people's collective unconscious, and find the Holy Grail, which they find themselves unable to defeat. The Holy Grail then separates them, imprisoning them all in an area called the Velvet Room. Morgana later reveals that he was created by a man named Igor and told to assist the protagonist before a being called Yaldabaoth could replace him. Upon reuniting, they manage to defeat Yaldabaoth, leading to the Metaverse's destruction and Morgana disappearing, though he returns later in his normal cat form, accepting this as his reality.

In the re-release, Persona 5 Royal, he is transformed into a human, revealed to be one of multiple alterations of reality by a man named Takuto Maruki, who aspired to give everyone their perfect reality. He becomes a cat again after Joker succeeds in convincing him that this is not reality. Once everyone is reminded of reality, the Phantom Thieves confront Maruki, managing to defeat him and return reality back to normal. Morgana appears in multiple sequels to Persona 5, including Persona 5 Strikers and Persona 5 Tactica. He is also a playable character in the music game Persona 5: Dancing Star Night. Outside of the Persona series, Morgana and content based on him appear in multiple games, including Overwatch 2, Hatsune Miku: Colorful Stage!, Super Smash Bros. Ultimate Super Monkey Ball Banana Mania and Fortnite. He has also received multiple pieces of merchandise, including figures, themed sake bottles, plushies, and apparel.

== Reception ==
Morgana's tendency to tell Joker to go to sleep and prevent him from doing anything more has been the subject of discussion and criticism. Game Informer writer Imran Khan identified this tendency as a common complaint with the game, arguing that the fact that it was another character preventing Joker from doing things at night took agency away from Joker. He expressed appreciation that Persona 5 Royal would have fewer instances of this. Fanbyte writer Kenneth Shepard took umbrage with Morgana in this respect, saying that while he could put up with Morgana preventing him from leaving at night, he found it annoying that Morgana prevented him from having Joker rewatch movies due to the advantage he would get from being able to do so. Morgana's English voice actress, Cassandra Lee Morris, parodied Morgana's tendency by doing a reading of the book Go the Fuck to Sleep in-character as Morgana.

Automaton writer Koji Fukuyama discussed how Morgana served as a "buddy" character to Joker, contrasting him with the assistant character from The Portopia Serial Murder Case, though argued that he was not utilized as well as he could be due to his amnesia. Contrasting Morgana with the dog Koromaru from Persona 3, fellow Automaton writer Carlos Zotomayor argued that Morgana is viewed as a "nuisance" by the other characters, such as through talking too much and thus causing problems, unlike Koromaru, who is viewed as a reassuring figure. He also felt that Morgana displayed "less-flattering human characteristics", such as arrogance and overconfidence. Zotomayor felt that this gave him more depth, but resulted in Morgana having less appeal than Koromaru. Futabanet staff identified Morgana as a "beloved mascot" for Persona 5, stating that he was extremely popular and that, despite behaving selfishly and nasty, Morgana's Japanese voice acting made him adorable.
