= Yusuke Kitagawa =

Persona 5 character

- Persona character
- Yusuke Kitagawa in Persona 5 Royal
- First game: Persona 5 (2016)
- Designed by: Shigenori Soejima
- Voiced by: EN: Matthew Mercer; JA: Tomokazu Sugita
- Portrayed by: Koji Kominami (stage play)

In-universe information
- Nationality: Japanese

Yusuke Kitagawa (喜多川 祐介, Kitagawa Yūsuke) is one of the main characters and party members in the 2016 video game Persona 5. He is voiced by Tomokazu Sugita in Japanese and Matthew Mercer in English.

He is a member of the group Phantom Thieves of Hearts, who aim to change the hearts of those who do wrong to others. He joins the group after awakening to his Persona, Goemon, adopting the Phantom Thief nickname Fox (フォックス, Fokkusu). He is an eccentric and passionate artist who works under the tutelage of Ichiryusai Madarame, a prestigious artist, who becomes a target of the Phantom Thieves after they hear that he has been abusing his students.

Following his appearance, he has received a positive reception, mainly due to his eccentric and socially awkward personality and his passion when it comes to art, as well as the voice acting by Sugita and Mercer respectively.

== Concept and creation ==
Yusuke was created for Persona 5 by character designer Shigenori Soejima, going by the Phantom Thief nickname Fox to avoid giving away his identity. Designer Teppei Kabayashi identified him as one of his favorite characters to draw. He attributed this to Yusuke being a funny character, allowing him to be more funny with his art. He also felt that Yusuke was easy to draw efficiently. Yusuke's second-tier Persona, Kamu Susano-o, was chosen due to the mythological figure matching Yusuke's profile. They also used the name that they felt was the most divine. They were initially reluctant to use him due to Persona 4 character Yosuke Hanamura also using him, but they decided to use him due to him being a trickster god. Designer Azusa Shimada noted that Yusuke seemed more serious before players got to know him, commenting that the way his portrait was designed in Persona 5 Royal made this more apparent on first glance.

Yusuke appears in Persona 5: Dancing Star Night, where his dancing was performed by dancer you-Z. Because of Yusuke's eccentric personality, choreographer Teppei Kabayashi advised that you-Z dance in a looser and more chaotic manner. He wanted the dance to focus less on being seen dancing, and more on the beauty that Yusuke would want to express through dance. This was difficult for you-Z, requiring several attempts to figure it out.

Yusuke's outfit in Dancing Star Night was designed by Kabayashi to be something that was cool, yet could also be made fun of by his friends, choosing a leather jacket adorned with spikes to accomplish this. He also had a Japanese-style ghost costume as a Halloween costume. Designer Azusa Shimada wanted to have two fireballs spinning around Yusuke, but felt it would be too unsettling, and thus settled on making them look handmade. Alternative designs were considered, including a defeated warrior or jiangshi. The designers intended but including an oiran as a costume for Yusuke, but they found that it was too difficult for him to dance in it. Despite efforts by the modeler to make it work, it was ultimately scrapped. He was also going to have an outfit based on the character Hazama from Shin Megami Tensei If…, though this was also scrapped due to it being too similar to Yusuke's regular outfit. Instead, they went with a kunoichi costume. He had a bedroom designed for this game, with Shimada electing to include strange objects and reference images to show off his artistry.

== Appearances ==
Yusuke first appeared in the 2016 Persona 5 as one of its main characters, eventually joining the Phantom Thieves of Hearts. He later appeared in the new version of Persona 5, Persona 5 Royal, which added new content including Yusuke and others. He is first introduced after the Phantom Thieves, consisting of Joker, Ryuji, Morgana, and Ann, have taken the heart of Suguru Kamoshida and began to target Ichiryusai Madarame, Yusuke's teacher and adoptive father, who is rumored to abuse his students and take credit for their work. He initially aims to get Ann to agree to model nude for her for him to paint, much to her disapproval. They eventually agree to it in order to infiltrate Madarame's home and find out more about him. Yusuke is defensive against the claims against Madarame, whom he credits for taking him in after his mother died. When they eventually invade Madarame's Palace, represented as a golden museum, Yusuke is pulled in as well, realizing various truths about Madarame, such as that he uses and abuses his students, as well as that he allowed Yusuke's mother to die of a seizure to steal her art and create forgeries of it to sell. Yusuke awakens his Persona at this point, joining the Phantom Thieves to fight against Madarame's Shadow. They eventually defeat him, causing Madarame to experience a change of heart and admit to his crimes. From then on, Yusuke aides his companions in their quest while pursuing his art.

== Reception ==
Destructoid writer Rich Meister regarded Yusuke as the best new character of 2017, finding his social awkwardness "weirdly charming." The Gamer writer Cian Maher also held Yusuke in high regard, identifying him as the game's best character. He noted, however, that Yusuke does behave inappropriately and disrespects boundaries, stating he would not defend that aspect of his character, choosing instead to view his post-Awakening self as a different person. He identified his Awakening scene as the best Awakening scene, discussing how Yusuke's views of the world through an artistic lens caused him to view even Madarame's theft through that lens. Game Rant writer Stan Hogeweg was critical of his depiction in Persona 5 Strikers, identifying him as a standout of the game's Phantom Thieves. He felt that Strikers exaggerated his personality, putting the character in a "negative light." He felt that the game reduced him to his eccentricities, where Persona 5 demonstrated that there is more to him, saying that he'd become primarily a comic relief character. He criticized this change, feeling like his compatriots judging him contradicted the Phantom Thieves' nature as a group of outcasts misjudged by others.

Yusuke has been discussed through a queer lens by critics. Fanbyte weiter Kenneth Shepard discussed how Yusuke was "emanating queer energy," specifically in the boat scene between him and Joker. He maligned how Persona 5 prevented him from having Joker enter into a relationship with him and other male characters, despite what he perceived as romantic chemistry between them. Kotaku writer Luke Plunkett enjoyed him as a confidant in the game, also feeling disappointed that the protagonist could not date Yusuke. The Mary Sue writer Madeline Carpou noted the discussion about how he should be a romance option for Joker, echoing Shepard's feelings about his sexuality. She felt that the connection between him and the protagonist was both "obvious and well-written," arguing that them as a couple made more sense than half of the romance options in the game.

In an analysis of Yusuke's speech patterns, writer Martin Ivančić discussed how he represents "artistic elocution," as well as how his "poetic and metaphorical expressions, as well as intricate comparisons, emphasize his introspective and artistic sensitivity." He also noted how this manner of speech emphasizes Yusuke's tendency to draw comparisons between "mundane situations and profound concepts," suggesting that his artistic nature informed how his characterization manifested.
