= Goro Akechi =

Persona 5 character

- Persona character
- First game: Persona 5 (2016)
- Designed by: Shigenori Soejima
- Voiced by: EN: Robbie Daymond; JA: Sōichirō Hoshi
- Portrayed by: Yoshihide Sasaki (stage play)

In-universe information
- Nationality: Japanese

Goro Akechi (Japanese: 明智 吾郎, Hepburn: Akechi Gorō), who uses the code name Crow (クロウ, Kurō), is a fictional character and the secondary antagonist of the 2016 video game Persona 5, which is the sixth installment of the Persona series. A third-year high school detective nicknamed "The Second Coming of the Detective Prince", Akechi opposes the Phantom Thieves' actions and becomes both a rival and foil to Joker, the group's leader. He is voiced by Sōichirō Hoshi in Japanese and Robbie Daymond in English.

Created by Shigenori Soejima, Akechi was developed to be a mysterious detective and Joker's opposite. His name and character are in reference to the fictional character Kogoro Akechi created by Edogawa Ranpo, specifically with his portrayal as a celebrity detective mirroring the original Akechi's role in Ranpo's works. Besides printed and animated versions of the series, he has also been featured in the spin-offs Persona 5: Dancing in Starlight and Persona Q2: New Cinema Labyrinth. For Persona 5 Royal, his characterization was further explored in order to appeal more to players.

Initial critical reception towards his character in both the game and the anime was mixed, despite ranking high on official character polls, receiving praise for the voice acting, his abilities, and his interesting bond with Joker, but criticism for his lack of depth and his passive-aggressive personality. Because of this, Akechi was further explored in Royal, and upon its release critics found him to be more likable due to Atlus handling him in a different fashion from his original version.

== Development ==
Akechi's character design was created by Shigenori Soejima. Early in development, the creative team decided he was going to be a detective but was unsure on how suspicious he would look or what role he would play in the story, with one early suggestion being that he was Makoto Niijima's brother. Eventually, the team decided to make him look well-behaved with a cheerful personality, with an unbuttoned collar button, loose tie, and messy hair. His main color is white to contrast with Joker's black color scheme. He also wears black gloves, though at one point, the creative team believed it would give him away as the group's traitor. His Phantom Thief outfit contains a mask resembling a tengu to give him a condescending appearance, while his outfit was kept formal to resemble an officer.

For Persona 5 Royal, due to Akechi's initial polarizing reception, Kazuhisa Wada noted the difficulties in making sure he seemed true to his character during the third semester. The new events where Akechi socializes with Joker were made to expand on his character and appeal to the audience that disliked his original take. His new battle dialogue was initially "wilder", but because Wada and Daiki Ito found Hoshi's voice acting too strong, he was asked to re-record. Late in development, the art team suggested giving Akechi different character portraits, including his default stern expression, as a way for him to show his "true" self around the Phantom Thieves and especially Joker. Other than Joker, Akechi does not care for anyone else, which is exemplified in how he scolds Sumire Yoshizawa for missing her attacks. Wada also stated that other than a rival, Akechi is also considered a deuteragonist.

Akechi's first Persona is Robin Hood, a "hero of justice" who matches his "superhero" image. His second Persona is Loki, who has a dazzle camouflage pattern likened to World War I battleships to disguise from enemies, as well as horns similar to leucochloridium parasites to make its origins less clear. This also displays how Akechi's true nature has been hidden from the player throughout the game. In Persona 5 Royal, during the game's third semester, Akechi gains Hereward as his Ultimate Persona.

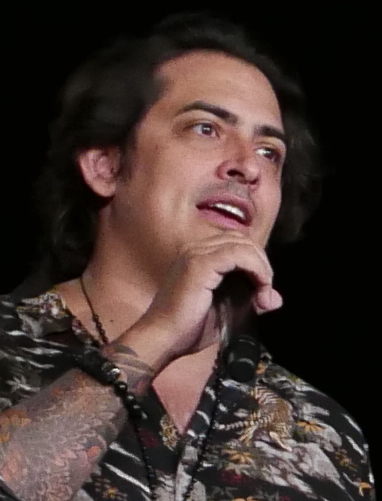
Robbie Daymond (pictured in 2019) voiced Akechi in the English version.

Akechi is voiced by Sōichirō Hoshi in Japanese and Robbie Daymond in English. Hoshi described Akechi as a high school detective and a "pleasant young man", but notes that these traits do not define him. Daymond was surprised by the impact of his character. Revisiting the game following recording, Daymond found it surreal due to how he kept looking about Akechi's character, finding him fun to play.

== Appearances ==
=== In Persona 5 ===
Akechi is a playable character in Persona 5, with his character first revealed to the public during E3 2016. As a Confidant, Akechi represents the Justice Arcana. In the game, he is a third-year high school student and celebrity detective known as "The Second Coming of the Detective Prince." (a reference to Persona 4's Naoto Shirogane) He opposes the Phantom Thieves and becomes Joker's rival, but he later joins them during Sae's Palace, using the code name "Crow." Akechi later betrays the Phantom Thieves, partly out of jealousy for Joker, and is revealed to have been the black masked assassin causing cognitive shutdowns under the orders of Masayoshi Shido, a corrupt politician. Akechi confronts the Phantom Thieves again in Shido's Palace, revealing that he is Shido's illegitimate son and plots to get revenge on him for abandoning his mother after finding out she was pregnant, which ultimately led to her suicide. Like Joker, Akechi is also a "wild card" who can hold multiple Personas, a power Yaldabaoth gave him to see whether chaos or order will dominate society. However, his "wild card" power failed to develop properly due to his nihilistic view of human relations. Akechi later sacrifices himself to save the Phantom Thieves after learning Shido planned on having him killed after the election.

While playable only during the duration of Sae's Palace, in Persona 5 Royal, the updated re-release, Akechi was made playable in the third semester of the game with a new interactive Confidant and abilities. During the third semester, he aids Joker in investigating Maruki's Palace, this time interacting with him with his true personality. Near the end of the game, Maruki reveals that Akechi's return was through Joker's wish to save him. Wada and Ito intentionally made it so that Akechi's survival depended on the player's choice in the game, specifically certain choices made in his Confidant.

=== In other media ===
Akechi has also appeared in other spin-off titles, such as Persona 5: Dancing in Starlight as a downloadable content, and Persona Q2: New Cinema Labyrinth. Akechi also appears in Persona 5: The Animation with more focus on his character compared to the game, a conscious decision made by director Masashi Ishihama and producer Kazuki Adachi, who both stated that without his "dark side", the anime would be "boring." Fashion brand SuperGroupies also created a collaboration apparel line based on Akechi and Joker. In the stage play adaptation, Akechi is portrayed by Yoshihide Sasaki. To prepare for the role, Sasaki completed Persona 5, stating that he was "shocked" upon seeing Akechi's sudden change and that he was looking forward to portraying his dual personalities.

== Reception ==
Akechi has received mixed reception among critics and fans. He consistently ranked highly in popularity polls. Akechi was voted #1 by Japanese fans as their favorite Confidant in Persona 5 Maniacus and volume 12 of the magazine Comiket Plus. Comments from Comiket Plus stated that Akechi seemed to be a very "human" character and enjoyed his rivalry with Joker. Akechi was also voted #1 as the overall favorite character by attendees at Sega Festival 2016, with a consensus that he evoked "motherly feelings" from fans. In Persona 5's 5th Anniversary Poll, he ranked third place. In Persona Q2: New Cinema Labyrinth and Atlus Southeast Asia's Persona 5 Royal popularity polls, he both ranked fifth place. In Sega's Persona 5 character popularity poll held on their Bilibili account, Akechi ranked first place.

Gita Jackson from Kotaku noted that Akechi was a favorite among Persona 5 fans due to the online reception of his inclusion in Persona 5: Dancing in Starlight. However, Chris Moyes from Destructoid regards Akechi as the "worst boy" of the series, describing him as having a "passive-aggressive attitude" and an "obsessional personality built upon narcissism and misplaced arrogance." Tristan Jurkovich from TheGamer also reviewed him as one of the worst additions of the Royal version, criticizing that "automatically building a relationship with him throughout the original's encounters, players must now go on hangout sessions. Getting to know more about him might sound appealing, perhaps, to newcomers, but knowing what comes of him later, well, it's hard to buy this new facade that was added to Royal." In addition, Clayton Purdom from The A.V. Club found Akechi's character to be "air-dropped in from a kid's anime", and that he felt like a minor character due to "tipping the scales too far" between the "real-world darkness and over-the-top cheeriness" of the game. Siliconera and GameSpot praised Akechi's characterization in Royal for providing more likable interactions with Joker. Polygon shared similar comments in the handling of Akechi in Royal, finding it superior to the original one. Comic Book Resources ranked Akechi and Joker's Showtime in 1st place, praising the special move for being filled with symbolism of their complicated but powerful relationship. Pancakes also became an internet meme associated with Akechi.

In his review of Persona 5: The Animation, Christopher Farris from Anime News Network felt the anime fleshed out Akechi's character in contrast to the game, also stating that his presence in the story builds a "sense of escalation" due to his opposition towards the Phantom Thieves. He cited Akechi's rivalry with Joker as "dynamic" and felt that their discussions about morality were "cozy" in spite of their animosity. However, he felt that the revelations about Akechi's character motivation seemed "last minute."
