= Makoto Niijima =

Persona 5 character

- Persona character
- Makoto Niijima in her Phantom Thief form in Persona 5
- First game: Persona 5 (2016)
- Designed by: Shigenori Soejima
- Voiced by: EN: Cherami Leigh; JA: Rina Satō
- Portrayed by: Kanon Nanaki (Stage #2); Akari Ishizuka (Stage #3)

In-universe information
- Nationality: Japanese

Makoto Niijima (Japanese: 新島 真, Hepburn: Niijima Makoto), whose Phantom Thief code name is Queen (Japanese: クイーン, Hepburn: Kuīn), is a character in the Persona series, first appearing in the 2016 video game Persona 5 as one of its main characters. She is voiced by Cherami Leigh in English and Rina Satō in Japanese.

She is a third-year student and the student council president of Shujin Academy, as well as the younger sister of the prosecutor Sae Niijima. She initially appeared as an enemy of the Phantom Thieves of Hearts, but would eventually become a member of the group, even becoming the team's strategist during their time in the Metaverse.

Following her appearance, Makoto received a positive reception, often being highlighted as a fan favorite character, with critics praising the voice acting by Leigh and Satō respectively, her design, and her strong convictions.

== Concept and creation ==
Makoto Niijima first appears in Persona 5, and her design was created by Shigenori Soejima. Persona 5 director Katsura Hashino described her as someone who "no longer [has] a place where they belong in society" and as a "juvenile academic," adding that the game's events gave her a sense of belonging. He discussed how her role as a Phantom Thief reflects how she breaks away from societal expectations. Her Personas, Johanna and Anat, are based on Pope Joan and the Semitic goddess of the same name. She is voiced by Rina Satō in the original Japanese audio, and Cherami Leigh in the English localization. Leigh regards Makoto's story as her dealing with moral and ethical grey areas, specifically in how she feels about the protagonists. She describes her character as "unconventional."

== Appearances ==
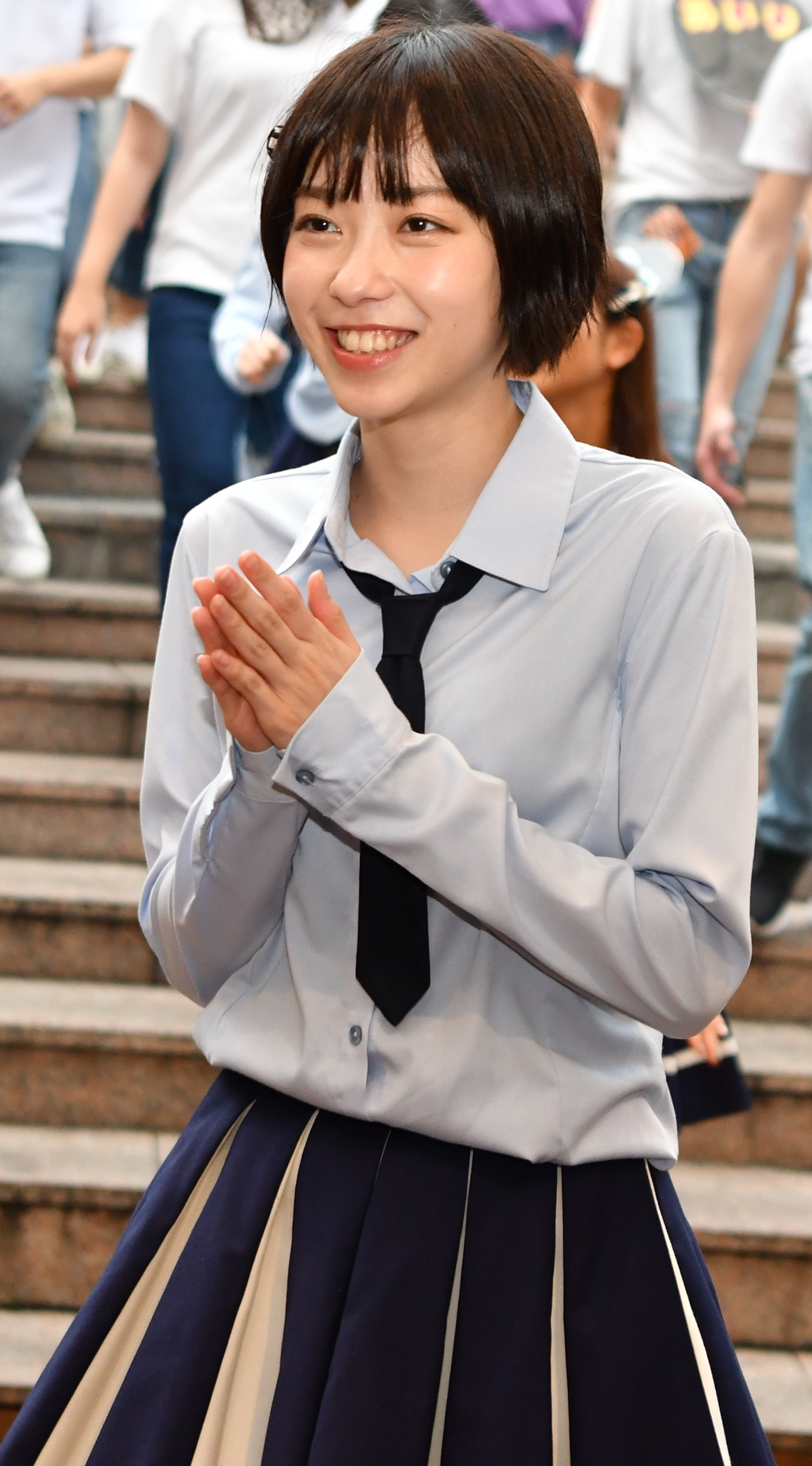
Akari Ishizuka portrayed Makoto in the third and fourth stage plays

Makoto first appears in Persona 5, tasked with uncovering the identity of the Phantom Thieves by her principal in exchange for a good recommendation for a university. She starts following people she believes suspicious, including Joker, Ryuji, Ann, and Yusuke, eventually discovering their true identities as the Phantom Thieves. She offers to keep their secret, on the condition that they use their abilities to change the heart of a mafia boss. She helps find the identity of this boss, a man named Junya Kaneshiro, and ends up getting blackmailed. Makoto joins them as a Phantom Thief after infiltrating his Palace, defeating his Shadow and forcing him to confess his crimes after taking his heart. She lies in her report to the principal that the Phantom Thieves were students, expressing disinterest in his recommendation.

Her sister, Sae Niijima, works as a prosecutor investigating the Phantom Thieves, and butts head with Makoto over her feelings on the goodness of the group. She also helps by taking information from her, eventually becoming blackmailed alongside the rest of the Phantom Thieves by a detective called Goro Akechi. He forces them to steal her sister's heart, with Makoto revealing she knew she had a Palace and wanted to change her heart through other means. Makoto discovers that Sae's true feelings are to view trials as games to win by any means, and she eventually defeats her, convincing her to change her ways. Makoto and the others also discover that Akechi had been setting them up, eventually managing to trick him and defeat him, as well as Masayoshi Shido, a man whose goals would destroy Japan. They collectively suffer under a being called the Yaldabaoth, who helped cultivate their Personas, causing all of them to disappear from the people's collective consciousness. Joker manages to save them, and they go on to kill the Yaldabaoth.

She appears in Phantasy Star Online 2 as a costume, and in Super Smash Bros. Ultimate as a background character on the stage Mementos, which comes with Joker's DLC Pack. She appears as one of the guest characters from Persona 5 Royal in Season 6 of Call of Duty: Mobile, titled "Take Your Heart". In August 2026, Makoto was introduced as a recruitable guest character in Goddess of Victory: NIKKE as part of its collaboration with the Persona series.

== Promotion and reception ==
Makoto received a Figma figurine and a Nendoroid figurine, both which were announced at the CCG Expo 2018. A prototype of the Figma figurine was later shown. A prototype Amakuni figurine was revealed at Wonder Festival 2017 of Makoto riding her Persona, Johanna.

Makoto has received generally positive reception, identified as a fan favorite. She was the second most popular Persona 5 character by fans after the lead protagonist. Her anime adaptation was well-received by fans as well. Kimberley Wallace of Game Informer regarded her as her favorite Persona 5 character and one of her favorites in the series. She cited her work ethic and strong convictions as part of why she enjoys her so much. Holly Green for Paste Magazine found her to be one of the best new video game characters of 2017, citing her "stylish" character design. RPGFan called her their favorite supporting character of 2017, praising how she balances her Phantom Thief role - a "motorcycle-riding badass" - and her role as a "fastidious student council president." RPGFan's readership felt similarly, where she was "far and away" the favorite. Clayton Purdom for The A.V. Club ranked her his second favorite character in Persona 5, identifying her "inner rage boil[ing] over" as the game's best moment and the most "interesting character moment." Steve Jones for Anime News Network felt similarly about this scene; he noted that the scene - depicting someone "who's expected to be the model student and nothing more" - was a typical one, but that it was also executed well.

She has been considered as the best female character in Persona 5 by writers from various websites, including Siliconera, Gamasutra, RPGamer, and GameSpot. Jenni for Siliconera discussed how she has sides to her that she doesn't show, regarding her as a "practical character." Amanda Yeo for Kotaku discussed how despite initially disliking Makoto due to her cold demeanor and how she works against the protagonists at first, she warmed up to her due to Makoto recognizing her flaws and working towards improving. She regards her as a stark contrast to fellow protagonist Ryuji Sakamoto, due to his brash and hot personality and felt that his fans would dislike her, and vice versa.

Writer Nicole L. Rowe discussed Makoto and her Persona awakening moment as being intertextual with her, as well as how her interactions with Kaneshiro tie into issues of sex trafficking in Japan.
