= Ryuji Sakamoto =

Persona 5 character

- Persona character
- Ryuji Sakamoto, as he appears in Persona 5
- First game: Persona 5 (2016)
- Designed by: Shigenori Soejima
- Portrayed by: Kouhei Shiota (stage play)
- Voiced by: EN: Max Mittelman; JA: Mamoru Miyano
- Motion capture: Yu Jurry (Persona 5: Dancing Star Night)

In-universe information
- Nationality: Japanese

Ryuji Sakamoto (Japanese: 坂本 竜司, Hepburn: Sakamoto Ryūji) is one of the main characters in the 2016 video game Persona 5. He is one of the founding members of the Phantom Thieves of Hearts, after awakening to his Persona, Captain Kidd, adopting the Phantom Thief nickname Skull (スカル, Sukaru).

He is a bullied student, a victim of physical abuse by one of the game's antagonists, Suguru Kamoshida. He joins with the protagonist, Joker, after they both founded themselves entering another world and eventually gain powers to fight against corrupt people and abusers, including Kamoshida. His Persona eventually transforms into the Persona Seiten Taisei. He is portrayed by Mamoru Miyano in Japanese and Max Mittelman in English.

Since his role in Persona 5, he has received generally mixed reception, regarded as one of the less popular characters in the game, although some fans found it surprising that he ranked so low. His treatment as comic relief, particularly through comic violence, has been criticized, with writer Kenneth Shepard suggesting that the fact that he was a victim of abuse that is taken seriously in the story is undercut when he is so often the victim of such comic violence.

== Concept and creation ==
Ryuji Sakamoto was created for Persona 5 by designer Shigenori Soejima, going by the Phantom Thief nickname Skull to avoid giving away his identity. Director Katsura Hashino described Ryuji as having a "mischievous personality." Artist Azusa Shimada found it difficult to draw Ryuji correctly, finding that he can be neither too handsome or too relaxed, and after drawing him, finding that he is unrecognizable. Soejima also felt him the most difficult to draw, stating that he created and provided Ryuji's design to the animation company in a rush, and when the concept art based on Hanako Oribe came back, he didn't recognize him. Ryuji's Persona is Captain Kidd, which eventually becomes Seiten Taisei when Captain Kidd awakens. The decision to use Seiten Taisei as his awakened Persona was due to multiple factors, including his personality and backstory. They also included him because Seiten Taisei in his most famous Japanese depiction is that of the blonde monkey. The fact that Captain Kidd rides a boat and Seiten Taisei rides a cloud similarly was also a factor.

He is voiced in Japanese by Mamoru Miyano and in English by Max Mittelman. Mittelman did not audition for the role, but was given the opportunity by Atlus to voice for Persona 5, submitted for a role in the game. He was discovered by Atlus after he performed a role in Shin Megami Tensei IV: Apocalypse as the character Hallelujah. Atlus felt that he would be a good fit for Ryuji, with him being told that no one else could voice Ryuji. Mittelman speculated that he would have been given only the protagonist, Joker or Ryuji, hoping that he would be picked for Ryuji. During the voice work, the directors allowed him to do what he wanted to do, though he was unsure if it was because they wanted him to do what he wanted or because he did a good job matching the Japanese performance. Mittelman discussed how much he enjoyed voicing Ryuji due to how "explosive" he was, as well as how justified his anger. He discussed how he put a lot of himself into Ryuji, as he found Ryuji relatable. When asked who of the characters he voiced he related to the most, he picked Ryuji, as he related to growing up with a desire to rebel against authority.

Ryuji Scenario writer and choreographer Teppei Kobayashi for Persona 5: Dancing Star Night compared Ryuji to Junpei Iori from Persona 3, discussing how difficult it was to keep their dance styles from being too similar due to their similar personalities and the fact that Yu Jurry performed motion capture for both Ryuji and Junpei. Kobayashi discussed how Ryuji's personality was still relatively new compared to Junpei's, and the team discussed which traits they would develop in this game. They did not want to focus too much on him being a delinquent, as they worried it would be too similar to Kanji Tatsumi from Persona 4, also performed by Jurry in Persona 4: Dancing All Night. He described Ryuji as having the feel of a dropout, but still being earnest and passionate, wanting that to be reflected in his dancing. During a partner dance between Ryuji and Morgana, Ryuji air guitars; this idea was conceived by Jurry.

== Appearances ==
Ryuji first appeared in 2016's Persona 5 as one of the earliest members of the Phantom Thieves of Hearts. He also appears in Persona 5 Royal, the enhanced re-release. He later appears in multiple spinoffs, including Persona 5 Strikers, Persona Q2: New Cinema Labyrinth, Persona 5: Dancing Star Night, Persona 5 Tactica, and Persona 5: The Phantom X. In Dancing Star Night, Ryuji has multiple alternate outfits, including one based on Ryuji Goda from the Yakuza series and one based on Aleph from Shin Megami Tensei II, the latter requiring that they make a backside for the outfit due to one not existing in the game.

== Reception ==
Ryuji has received mixed reception since his appearance in Persona 5. Ryuji was the second-to-last party member on a poll of favorite Persona 5 Royal characters, which left Rock Paper Shotgun writer Kaan Serin shocked, who said that his placement resulted in strong reactions from fans. He suggested that his English voice actor may have helped make him more popular in the west. However, his characterization was criticized by others. The A.V. Club writer Clayton Purdom felt that his archetype did not make sense, and that it caused his plot arc to be confused. USgamer writer Caty McCarthy felt that he defied the archetype, which had previously been used for Junpei Iori and Yosuke Hanamura from Persona 3 and Persona 4 respectively. She discussed how this archetype is "loud and annoying," but Ryuji's personality elevates beyond that, citing his rough background and calling him a "sweet kid" who cares about his friends and justice. In her first playthrough of Persona 5, Kotaku writer Amanda Yeo expected to hate Ryuji due to the negative fan response, thinking that he had done something significant to earn the ire. Yeo noted that there were multiple traits that would make people dislike him, including his interactions with women and Morgana, but also called him "straightforward, honest, loyal and willing to speak up against injustice." Yeo drew comparisons between Makoto Niijima and Ryuji, noting that some fans believe that people who love Ryuji would hate Makoto, and vice versa. They disliked Makoto at first, finding her cold, but coming to appreciate her as she developed, much like she did with Ryuji. Fanbyte writer Kenneth Shepard was critical of Persona 5's propensity to use Ryuji as the source of most physical comedy, arguing that him being a victim of physical abuse cast that trend in a negative light. He felt that this took away Ryuji's dignity and downplays Ryuji's abuse. Screen Rant writer John Tibbetts felt similarly disappointed by how much of Ryuji's role is relegated to comic relief, feeling like they undermine both Persona 5 Strikers and Ryuji himself. He felt that the character Akira Konoe should have been contrasted with Ryuji, deriding that the team seemed to only be interested in Ryuji as a joke character.

Kotaku writer Ria Teitelbaum felt that a lack of a romantic relationship between Ryuji and Joker was a missed opportunity, feeling that Ryuji had more emotional depth with Joker than Joker's potential romance options have. They found that the game avoided the idea of a relationship between them because the series has an issue with homophobia, citing two "predatory" gay men in Persona 5 and cut content where Persona 4 character Yosuke Hanamura confessed his love for protagonist Yu Narukami. He suggested that the change in staff, particularly with the introduction of director Katsura Hashino, was the cause of the series becoming less progressive. Writer Martin Ivančić discussed how Ryuji's linguistic profile served as the representative of "casual/informal vernacular," describing it as "youthful, loud, and energetic, filled with slang and expletives." He suggested that his use of slang and expletives serve to emphasize both his emotional and rebellious nature, contrasting Japanese society, which is more polite and respectful. Writer David Daniel Ribeiro da Silva discussed the choice of associating William Kidd with Ryuji, commenting how it reflected Ryuji's personality due to Captain Kidd's duality of behaving amorally while still seemingly having a moral code. He pointed to various qualities of Ryuji, including "blunt but kind" personality, his tendency to resort to violence and immaturity, and his desire to protect others even if he has to commit crimes as examples of points of comparison. He also discussed their similar backgrounds, namely that both grew up without a father,

A pair of Ryuji's shoes garnered controversy in South Korea due to the imagery of the Rising Sun Flag, which has a negative connotation to some South Koreans due to war crimes committed by Japan on South Korea. Kotaku writer Brian Ashcraft noted that rather than the presence of the Rising Sun Flag indicating any association with war crimes, its use indicates that Ryuji is a yankii, specifically in the bōsōzoku subculture.
