= Akari Ishizuka =

Japanese actress (born 1997)

- 石塚朱莉
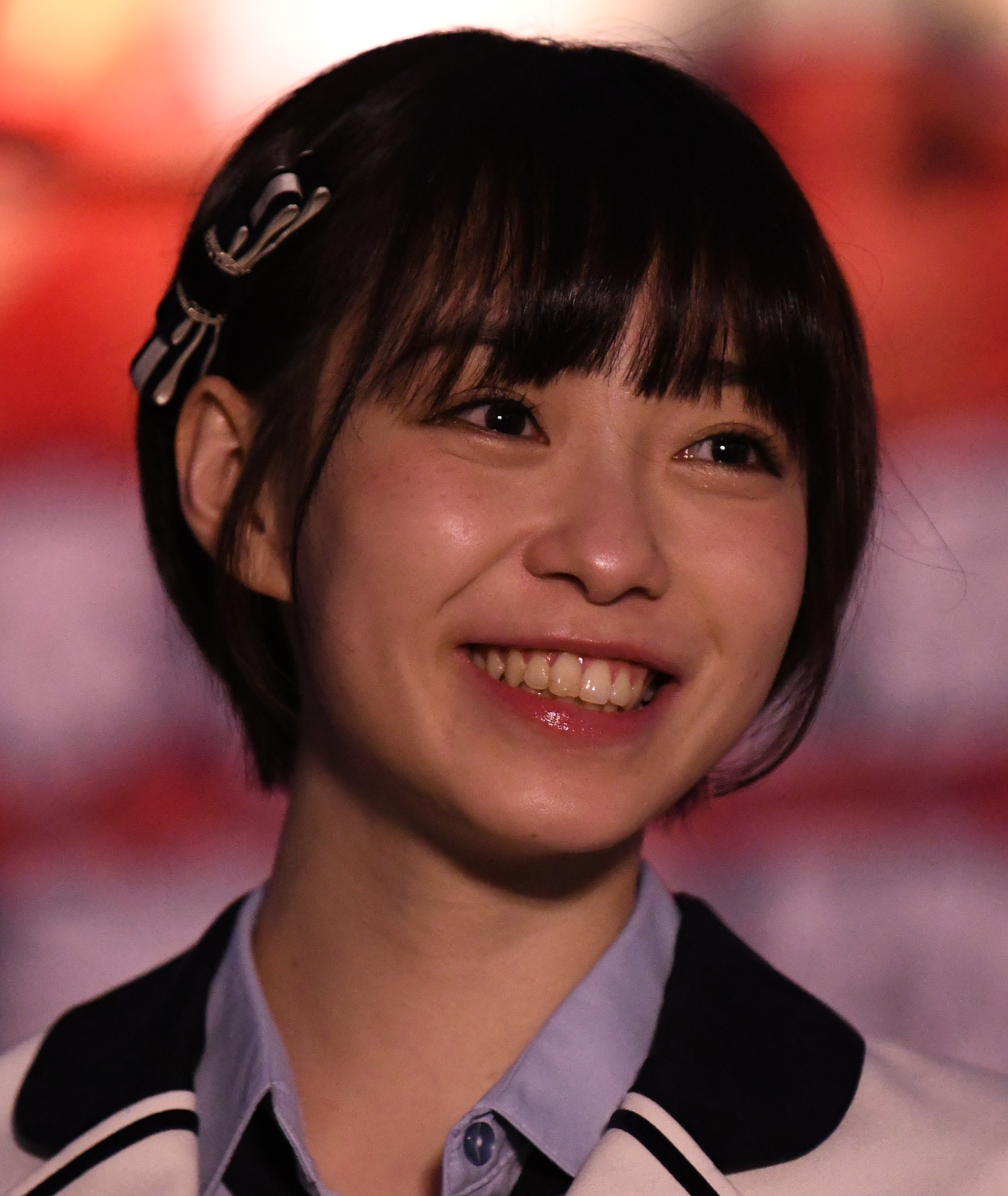
- Ishizuka in 2019
- Born: July 11, 1997 (age 29); Dazaifu, Fukuoka, Japan
- Occupations: Actress; YouTuber
- Years active: 2018–present

Akari Ishizuka (石塚朱莉, Ishizuka Akari) (born July 11, 1997) is a Japanese actress and YouTuber. She is a former member of NMB48. Ishizuka is the producer of the theater company Akazunoma and owner of the clothing brand Green Tea Cookie Fun Club.

== Life ==
Born in Osaka Prefecture, Ishizuka lives in Chiba Prefecture. She became interested in theater after watching a musical performance starring NMB48 member Rika Kishino, and eventually joined NMB48 as a result.

Ishizuka has appeared in Kōhaku Uta Gassen for three consecutive years since 2013.

== Filmography ==
- Bad Play Vol.18 "Melomelo-tachi" (July 15-31, 2016, HEP Hall/Akasaka Red Theater) – Tsuzuki Namahami
- Bad Play vol.19 "Trap" (April 8-16, 2017, HEP HALL/April 18-23, West Tokyo Metropolitan Theater) – Koko Nadede
- Akazunoma Theatre Company
  - "Exhibitionist" (April 12-15, 2018, ABC Hall) – Goki and Hiru (one person playing two roles)
  - "Nocturne" (January 24-27, 2019, ABC Hall / January 31-February 3, Shinjuku Mura Live) – Tsutomu
  - "Enigma: Irreversible Friendship" (July 15-17, 2022, Dotonbori Zaza House)
