= Persona Q2: New Cinema Labyrinth =

2018 video game

- Developers: P-Studio; Lancarse
- Publishers: Sega: JP: Atlus; EU: Deep Silver
- Director: Yuta Aihara
- Producers: Daisuke Kanada; Kazuhisa Wada
- Programmer: Hirokazu Tohyama
- Artist: Hanako Oribe
- Writer: Akira Akemine
- Composer: Atsushi Kitajoh
- Series: Persona
- Platform: Nintendo 3DS
- Release: JP: November 29, 2018; WW: June 4, 2019
- Genres: Role-playing, dungeon crawler
- Mode: Single-player

Persona Q2: New Cinema Labyrinth (Note: Persona Q2: New Cinema Labyrinth (Japanese: ペルソナQ2 ニュー シネマ ラビリンス, Hepburn: Perusona Kyū Tsū: Nyū Shinema Rabirinsu)) is a 2018 role-playing video game developed by P-Studio and Lancarse and published by Sega for the Nintendo 3DS. A part of the Persona series and a sequel to Persona Q: Shadow of the Labyrinth, the game involves a large cast of characters from Persona 3, Persona 4, and Persona 5 as they become trapped within a movie theater and navigate a series of film-based dungeons. It was released in Japan in November 2018 and in North America, Europe, and Australia in June 2019.

Persona Q2 combines first-person dungeon crawling inspired by the Etrian Odyssey series with turn-based combat and Persona usage from the main series. Players form teams from a roster of characters who can use a primary and sub-Persona. A "Special Screening" feature that occurs between dungeon sections replaces the school social links and exploration from its predecessor, with new character interactions and the ability to unlock new combined skills.

Persona Q2 received generally favorable reviews upon release, with critics praising its music, crossover character interactions, and presentation, while some noted the large roster made party management demanding.

== Gameplay ==
Persona Q2 is a crossover video game, containing characters from Persona 3, Persona 4, and Persona 5. It focuses on dungeon crawling in a style similar to the Etrian Odyssey series, also created by developer P-Studio. Gameplay follows a group of characters as they navigate mazes, with turn-based battles forming on certain areas. Players explore labyrinths from a first-person perspective in the style of the Etrian Odyssey series, manually drawing maps on the Nintendo 3DS's touch screen as they progress through each floor, though an auto-mapping option is available. Each dungeon is populated by Shadows, powerful creatures visible on the field map that players must navigate around—alongside random encounters triggered through normal exploration.

== Plot ==
The game's story is set in the events of Persona 5 (2016). During a trip to Mementos, Joker and the rest of the Phantom Thieves of Hearts find themselves in a film that is connected to a movie theater that is locked from the inside. With Makoto and Haru kidnapped, the Phantom Thieves encounter inhabitants in the theater who are also locked in with them: Nagi, the curator of the cinema, and Hikari, a shy amnesiac schoolgirl, as well as Doe, a Shadow in the projection room. Nagi explained that all of her customers, aside from Hikari, suddenly vanished, and with no other way forward, the team decided to investigate each labyrinth throughout the movie to rescue Makoto and Haru.

As the Phantom Thieves venture through movies, they are joined by Persona users from different timelines: the Persona 3 female protagonist in Kamoshidaman; the Investigation Team in Junessic Land; and SEES in A.I.G.I.S, who fell into the movie world during routine trips to the TV World and Tartarus. Each film the group travels through has morals surrounding discarding individuality and personality, and conforming to others' expectations and consequences. Whilst traveling, the party derails each movie's distorted moral codes by changing the films' endings, giving them happy endings as Hikari and Nagi watch from the theater. Upon returning, Doe presents them with a key that unlocks each of the 4 locks on the door.

Upon unlocking the 3rd lock, Hikari is presumably kidnapped by Doe, who escapes into the 4th film, a vivid musical with a blacked-out title. While exploring the film, the group discovers that the movies are cognitive worlds created from Hikari's repressed memories. Throughout her life, she experienced traumatic events that make her believe individuality is worthless and meaningless, causing Hikari to lose her self-esteem and eventually plunge into depression, often confining herself in her bedroom. Her father, who supported Hikari's endeavors throughout her life, brought her a notebook as a gift, but she rejected it and remained unresponsive. When he asked her why, his phrasing triggered a traumatic flashback, causing her to be overwhelmed by self-destructive tendencies that completely broke her down.

Upon reaching the final stage, the group encounters Doe, who expresses a desire to keep Hikari in the Cinema forever to end all of her pain, which she denies. After defeating the rampaging Doe, Hikari steps forward and shares a hug with Doe, who is revealed to be a cognitive manifestation of Hikari's father, and tearfully confesses her negative thoughts to him, but also her admiration for him and her suppressed desire to break free from her shell. With Hikari overcoming her trauma, Doe then transforms into the final key, and the film's title is revealed to be "Hikari".

With all the locks unlocked, the group exits the cinema, only to discover a world where the borderline between cinema and reality begins to blur. Nagi then reveals her true nature as Enlil, a god created from humanity's desire to end all of their pain that draws depressed and miserable people into her world and has them re-watch their memories, trapping them there with their lack of desire to escape and sunken to despair. Using Hikari's edited films, the group purifies the Theater District and sends a calling card to Enlil. After a climactic battle with Hikari's help, the group defeats Enlil and makes her realize humanity's possibilities.

The people in her domain are freed, yet their memories are wiped, and they have no recollection of the events. Before leaving, the groups bid their farewells and leave, with Hikari tearfully bidding them all goodbye. Hikari wakes up in reality, and she makes amends with her father while expressing her desire to create her film, which her father approves of. The P3 and P4 cast wake up and watch their respective films, including the alternate version of the P3 cast. The P5 cast wakes up and later receives an invitation to a high-school student film festival that they attend. At the festival, Hikari steps out and introduces herself as the director of a new film, "New Cinema Labyrinth".

== Development and release ==
Persona Q director Daisuke Kanada had originally envisioned the game as the foundation for a larger spin-off series rather than a standalone project. Following the release and positive reception of Persona 5, Atlus decided to create a Persona Q sequel featuring the cast of Persona 5. Full development for Persona Q2 began following the completion of Persona 5 in 2016, with Kanada returning as producer; the director was Yuta Aihara. Based on feedback from Persona Q, the team refined the gameplay mechanics and balanced the difficulty for its sequel. They also brought in new original characters and the Persona 5 cast. Due to fan demand, the female protagonist from Persona 3 Portable was also included as a character. To keep the story focused, there was no option of choosing which group of protagonists to choose from. Instead, the story focused primarily on the Persona 5 protagonists. As part of his original pitch, the original game's horror elements were toned down or removed, and the overall gameplay was simplified for new players. Aihara included the story-based "Special Screenings" elements based on his liking of the "Strolls" from Persona Q. Lancarse, developers of Atlus' Etrian Odyssey series, developed the game alongside P-Studio.

Composer Atsushi Kitajoh, the composer for Persona Q and other Persona games, returned to create new tracks for Persona Q2. His key words for the music were "Retro", "Pop", and "Kitsch". The vocals were provided by Yumi Kawamura (Persona 3), Mayumi Fujita (Persona 3 Portable), Shihoko Hirata (Persona 4) and Lyn (Note: Lyn's full name is Lyn Inazumi.) (Persona 5). Rapper Lotus Juice, who contributed to the series frequently since Persona 3, was also featured in several tracks. The opening theme "Road Less Taken" was a quartet performance by Kawamura, Hirata, Lyn, and Lotus Juice.

Persona Q2 was first announced in August 2017 alongside fellow spin-off titles Persona 3: Dancing in Moonlight and Persona 5: Dancing in Starlight. Its official reveal came in August the following year, where it was released in Japan on November 29, 2018. The game was released in North America and Europe on June 4, 2019, along with a "Showtime Premium Edition" for the former. It was the final completely original physical game released for the Nintendo 3DS in North America. Unlike previously localized Persona games, the game does not feature an English dub.

== Reception ==
Reception

Aggregate scores
Aggregator	Score
Metacritic	81/100
OpenCritic	88% recommend

Review scores
Publication	Score
Destructoid	8/10
Game Informer	8.5/10
GameRevolution	9/10
GameSpot	7/10
Nintendo Life	9/10
Nintendo World Report	9/10
Pocket Gamer	3.5/5
RPGamer	4/5
RPGFan	90/100

Persona Q2: New Cinema Labyrinth received "generally favorable reviews" according to review aggregator Metacritic, where it holds a score of 81/100 based on 36 critics. On OpenCritic, 88% of reviewers recommended it.

Many reviews framed the game partly in terms of the Nintendo 3DS's twilight years. Nintendo World Report (9/10) described it as a fitting conclusion for the platform and praised the soundtrack, calling the Persona series tradition of strong original music very much intact. Game Informer (8.5/10) highlighted the Special Screenings as among the best additions the sequel brought to the formula, noting that unlocking Unison attacks through character bonding brought the social dimension the main Persona games are known for directly into combat. GameSpot (7/10) found that minor annoyances did not significantly drag down the experience, calling it a solid dungeon crawler and a worthy final bow for the platform. Destructoid (8/10) observed that enjoyment of the game was contingent on a tolerance for the Persona 5 cast and for random encounters in 2019, but concluded that it earned its place as one of the platform's final major releases from a large publisher.

RPGFan awarded it 90/100 and Nintendo Life gave it 9/10. Game Revolution (9/10) called it a "niche blockbuster." RPGamer (4/5) noted that the Special Screenings made revisiting earlier dungeons feel rewarding rather than obligatory. Common criticisms across reviews included the difficulty of managing the game's large cast: by the midpoint, over 26 playable characters are available but only five can join the active party at once, requiring considerable grinding to keep alternates at a usable level. Some also felt that the sheer number of characters made it difficult for any individual to stand out in the main story.
