= Persona 3: Dancing in Moonlight and Persona 5: Dancing in Starlight =

2018 video games

Persona 3: Dancing in Moonlight; Persona 5: Dancing in Starlight
- Cover for the Persona Dancing: Endless Night Collection
- Developer: P-Studio
- Publishers: JP/NA: Atlus; PAL: Sega
- Director: Nobuyoshi Miwa
- Producer: Kazuhisa Wada
- Programmer: Daisuke Yajima
- Artists: Shigenori Soejima; Sachie Tohsuji
- Writer: Teppei Kobayashi
- Composer: Ryota Kozuka
- Series: Persona
- Platforms: PlayStation 4; PlayStation Vita
- Release: JP: May 24, 2018; WW: December 4, 2018
- Genre: Rhythm
- Mode: Single-player

Persona 3: Dancing in Moonlight (Note: Known in Japan as Persona 3: Dancing Moon Night (Japanese: ペルソナ3 ダンシング・ムーンナイト, Hepburn: Perusona Surī: Danshingu Mūn Naito)) and Persona 5: Dancing in Starlight (Note: Known in Japan as Persona 5: Dancing Star Night (Japanese: ペルソナ5 ダンシング・スターナイト, Hepburn: Perusona Faibu: Danshingu Sutā Naito)) are 2018 rhythm games by Atlus for the PlayStation 4 and PlayStation Vita. Forming part of the Persona series—itself part of the larger Megami Tensei franchise—the games respectively feature the central casts of the 2006 role-playing video game Persona 3 and the 2016 role-playing video game Persona 5. Gameplay focuses on characters from Persona 3 or Persona 5 taking part in rhythm-based gameplay set to original and remixed music from Persona 3 or Persona 5.

Development began in 2015 following the release and positive reception of Persona 4: Dancing All Night. Multiple staff returned from Dancing All Night, including character designer Shigenori Soejima and composer Ryota Kozuka. Dancing in Moonlight and Dancing in Starlight were simultaneously developed and planned as follow-ups to Dancing All Night. Dancing in Moonlight and Dancing in Starlight received mixed reviews from critics; the games' graphics and customizable features were praised, while their rhythm gameplay and lack of content were frequently criticized.

== Premise and gameplay ==
Persona 3: Dancing in Moonlight and Persona 5: Dancing in Starlight are rhythm games based on the role-playing video games Persona 3 and Persona 5. Featuring the central cast of Persona 3 or Persona 5, gameplay follows a similar pattern to Persona 4: Dancing All Night; a chosen character performs a song in a story location from Persona 3 or Persona 5, with the player using a six-button system to hit notes in time to the present musical track. During a section of the song dubbed "Fever", a chosen partner joins in for the routine, with unique choreography for each partner reflecting the characters' existing relationships. Interactions between characters between songs take place in the Velvet Room, a recurring location in the Persona series.

== Synopsis ==
=== Setting and characters ===
In the Persona series, the Velvet Room is a mysterious place between the world of dreams and reality. Its attendant Elizabeth assists the protagonist of Persona 3, and its attendants Caroline and Justine assist the protagonist of Persona 5.

=== Plot ===
The two games take place after the events of Persona 4: Dancing All Night. Upon hearing about the success of Margaret's dancers, her sisters, Elizabeth, Caroline, and Justine, become jealous. The sisters challenge each other's guests, the Phantom Thieves of Hearts and the Specialized Extracurricular Execution Squad, to a dance-off. Moonlight has Elizabeth time travel back to 2009, to allow her to have Makoto Yuki take part — since he is deceased by the time of Starlight. The event takes place within a dream in the Velvet Room, with everyone's memories of it being erased afterwards. The twins promise the Phantom Thieves a treasure if they dance for them. After the completion of the ball, Justine, Caroline, and Elizabeth decide that competing to see who had the best guest was pointless, and declare both sides to have won. They then reveal the prize was the experience, which the group accept as they had fun. In Moonlight, Elizabeth joins the dancers herself. In Starlight, the twins then add an additional reward of seeing the two of them dance as well.

== Development and release ==
Following the positive response to Dancing All Night, P-Studio—an Atlus department responsible for managing the Persona series—were encouraged to make a rhythm game based on the setting and characters of Persona 3. Dancing in Moonlight was developed simultaneously with Persona 5: Dancing in Starlight due to Persona 5 being in development at the time. Using their experience from developing Dancing All Night, the team focused on improving the experience for their new projects. The development proved challenging as the team was creating two games' worth of content at the same time. Kazuhisa Wada, who produced and directed Dancing All Night, returned as producer. Originally intending to produce and direct again, the game was instead directed by Nobuyoshi Miwa. Shigenori Soejima returned as character designer. The game was developed for both PlayStation 4 (PS4) and PlayStation Vita, with the main difference being that the PS4 version ran at a higher frame rate. The team initially intended to have both Dancing titles as a single game, but decided against this due to the two projects' strong and contrasting identities.

While the Persona 3 characters remained faithful to their designs, they were given highly acrobatic dance movements. To increase the variety of dance moves between characters, each song had a specific dancer and unique choreography. In Dancing All Night each character was assigned a dance genre and given limited moves due to their lack of experience in the game's story, but Dancing in Moonlight and Starlight allowed for customized choreography based on character personalities. Compared to Dancing All Night, the visual quality of character models was raised. They also moved more smoothly due to a large number of "double joint" parts in the internal skeleton not present in the models for Dancing All Night. The movement of clothing—which was based solely on physics calculations in Dancing All Night—used a combination of physics and clothing material combined with character choreography.

Dancing in Moonlight was the first time the cast of Persona 3 had been rendered with realistic proportions. It was also the first time the models accurately copied Soejima's artwork. Creating the models for Persona 3 cast members was a challenge due to the variety of ways they had been portrayed in anime and manga since the original game's release. Aigis, who required robotic movements without sacrificing flexibility or fluidity, was the most difficult character model to create. In contrast to the acrobatic choreography of Dancing in Moonlight, the team worked with the dancers to give the cast of Dancing in Starlight realistic dance routines.

While a story mode and new location were used in Dancing All Night, the team decided to replace it with a system based on character interactions within the original settings and scenario, though a minor story mode was included anyway. This decision was made following talks between Wada and Miwa. Creating the dormitory setting for Dancing in Moonlight was easy due to its simplistic design, while the team needed to work much harder creating the varied and complex backgrounds for Dancing in Starlight. Due to the games' tone compared to the main Persona series, the team felt they had greater freedom to put lighter and colorful elements into the games.

Dancing in Moonlight features 25 songs from Persona 3, and Dancing in Starlight features 26 musical tracks from Persona 5. Original music was composed for both games by Ryota Kozuka, who had previously worked on Dancing All Night; one of his compositions was Dancing In Moonlight's opening theme "Our Moment". Remixes of tracks from Persona 3 and Persona 5 were supervised by Kozuka and original composer Shoji Meguro, along with Atsushi Kitajoh and Toshiki Konishi. Additional remixes of the Persona 3 songs were done by guest musicians Yuu Miyake, Hideki Naganuma, Yuyoyuppe, Tetsuya Kobayashi, ATOLS, Novoiski, Lotus Juice (Note: Lotus Juice was also the game's system voice.), Sasakure.UK, T.Komine and Daisuke Asakura. Additional remixes of the Persona 5 songs were handled by Jazztronik, tofubeats, KAIEN and Taku Takahashi. The list of tracks that would be included was modified throughout the development process. Due to the long-established sound of Persona 3 since the original game's release, the theme song of Dancing in Moonlight was designed to reflect that sound; they had greater freedom creating the theme song of Dancing in Starlight due to Persona 5 being the most recent release. A particular Persona 3 track released as downloadable content (DLC), "Tanaka's Amazing Commodities", was initially planned as a very difficult track for Dancing All Night before being cut. It was remixed by Kozuka, with President Tanaka (Bin Shimada) as its guest vocalist.

The games were first announced in August 2017 alongside the Persona spinoff Persona Q2: New Cinema Labyrinth. The games were released in Japan on May 24, 2018. Downloadable content (DLC) featuring new costumes and music was also released. Two special editions were created for PS4 and Vita. The PS4 version came with physical copies of Dancing in Moonlight and Dancing in Starlight, a download code for the digital-exclusive PS4 port of Dancing All Night, and a full soundtrack. The Vita version included Dancing in Moonlight and Dancing in Starlight, the full soundtrack, and costume DLC based on protagonists from the wider Megami Tensei series. The game also supports PlayStation VR. Persona 3: Dancing in Moonlight and Persona 5: Dancing in Starlight were released outside of Japan on December 4, 2018, with a full English dub, dual audio options, and subtitles in English, French, Italian, German, and Spanish.

== Reception ==
Persona 3: Dancing in Moonlight

Aggregate scores
Aggregator	Score
Metacritic	73/100
OpenCritic	45% recommend

Review scores
Publication	Score
Electronic Gaming Monthly	4/5
Game Informer	7/10
GameSpot	9/10
Hardcore Gamer	3.5/5
Pocket Gamer	Vita: 4.5/5
Push Square	8/10
RPGFan	75/100
Shacknews	7/10
USgamer	3/5

Persona 5: Dancing in Starlight

Aggregate scores
Aggregator	Score
Metacritic	PS4: 72/100
OpenCritic	44% recommend

Review scores
Publication	Score
Destructoid	8.5/10
Electronic Gaming Monthly	4/5
Game Informer	7/10
GameSpot	8/10
Hardcore Gamer	3.5/5
Pocket Gamer	Vita: 4.5/5
Push Square	8/10
Shacknews	7/10
USgamer	3/5

Persona 5: Dancing in Starlight and Persona 3: Dancing in Moonlight received "mixed or average" reviews from critics, according to review aggregator website Metacritic.

The games' graphics were well received. The customizable costumes were also praised, with Hardcore Gamer's Jacob Bukacek commenting that "fans who enjoy this kind of thing should have a lot of fun seeing their favorite [characters] do their dance routines in these outlandish outfits."

Criticism was directed towards Dancing in Moonlight for its rhythm gameplay. The layout of notes appearing from the middle of the screen was perceived as awkward, cluttered, and hard to follow. In his review on Game Informer, Suriel Vazquez recounted that he sometimes failed to notice notes due to how busy the screen is. The modifier system, through which players can make the gameplay easier or harder, was liked as an addition for its easily customizable nature.

The social event mechanics were divisive among critics. Some said that it was not as in-depth and interesting as the story mode featured in Dancing All Night, such as Britanny Vincent of Shacknews, who felt there was "no substance to these brief interactions." Others enjoyed the less serious tone and emphasis on character interactions. Robert Ramsey from Push Square contested that the social events "fit the structure of the game a lot better than a long-winded story mode."

Dancing in Moonlight was also criticized for its lack of content. Nathan Lee of RPG Fan described 25 songs as "a paltry amount, especially considering that same song might have both an original and a remixed version." Other criticism was directed at the absence of certain characters, such as party member Koromaru and the female protagonist from Persona 3 Portable.

=== Awards ===
Persona 5: Dancing in Starlight was nominated for "Game, Music or Performance-Based" and "Song Collection" at the National Academy of Video Game Trade Reviewers Awards.
