= Persona Stalker Club =

Online variety show

- Presented by: Tomomi Isomura; Mafia Kajita
- Country of origin: Japan
- Original language: Japanese

Production
- Running time: 60-90 minutes

Original release
- Network: Niconico
- Release: February 28, 2014 – March 30, 2017

Persona Stalker Club (ペルソナストーカー倶楽部, Perusona Sutōkā Kurabu) is a Japanese monthly online variety show produced by Atlus. The show is a monthly digest for Atlus' Persona game series, events, and other Atlus titles meant as a way to "deepen the connection with fans." Persona Stalker Club is hosted by voice actress Tomomi Isomura and writer Mafia Kajita. Episodes are broadcast monthly on Niconico at midnight and ran from February 28, 2014, to March 30, 2017.

To celebrate the Japanese release of Persona 5, in 2016, the show was rebranded under the title Persona Stalker Club V. Several sticker sets for Line featuring Persona characters, Isomura, and Kajita were released. The "Persora-mimi Theater" segment of the show has led to the release of multiple CDs and a yearly awards ceremony honoring the best fan-submitted misheard lyrics.

== Episodes ==
=== Persona Stalker Club (2014-2016) ===
No. overall	No. in season	Title	Guests	Original release date
1	1	"Episode 1"	(None)	February 28, 2014
2	2	"Episode 2"	(None)	March 27, 2014
3	3	"Episode 3"	Yumi Kawamura	April 25, 2014
4	4	"Episode 4"	Lotus Juice	May 30, 2014
5	5	"Episode 5"	(None)	June 25, 2014
6	6	"Episode 6"	(None)	July 25, 2014
7	7	"Episode 7"	Tomokazu Sugita	August 29, 2014
8	8	"Episode 8"	(None)	September 30, 2014
9	9	"Episode 9"	Kappei Yamaguchi	October 31, 2014
10	10	"Episode 10"	Akemi Kanda	November 28, 2014
11	11	"Episode 11"	Ami Koshimizu	January 9, 2015
12	12	"Episode 12"	(None)	January 29, 2015
13	13	"Episode 13"	(None)	February 27, 2015
14	14	"Episode 14"	(None)	March 31, 2015
15	15	"Episode 15"	(None)	April 30, 2015
16	16	"Episode 16"	Lotus Juice	May 29, 2015
17	17	"Episode 17"	Daisuke Asakura	June 30, 2015
18	18	"Episode 18"	(None)	July 31, 2015
19	19	"Episode 19"	(None)	August 31, 2015
20	20	"Episode 20"	(None)	October 30, 2015
21	21	"Episode 21"	(None)	November 30, 2015
22	22	"Episode 22"	Megumi Toyoguchi	December 28, 2015
23	23	"Episode 23"	(None)	January 29, 2016
24	24	"Episode 24"	(None)	February 29, 2016
25	25	"Episode 25"	(None)	March 31, 2016
26	26	"Episode 26"	(None)	April 28, 2016

=== Persona Stalker Club V (2016-2017) ===
No. overall	No. in season	Title	Guests	Original release date
27	1	"Episode 1"	Jun Fukuyama	June 30, 2016
28	2	"Episode 2"	TBA	July 29, 2016
29	3	"Episode 3"	TBA	August 31, 2016
30	4	"Episode 4"	TBA	September 30, 2016
31	5	"Episode 5"	TBA	October 31, 2016
32	6	"Episode 6"	TBA	November 30, 2016
33	7	"Episode 7"	TBA	December 28, 2016
34	8	"Episode 8"	Ikue Ohtani	January 31, 2017
35	9	"Episode 9"	TBA	February 28, 2017
36	10	"Episode 10"	Rina Satō, Tomokazu Sugita	March 30, 2017

=== Specials ===
No.	Title	Original release date
Special	TBA	February 5, 2015
Special	"Persona Stalker Club: Tokyo Game Show 2015 Special at the Sega Booth"; Transliteration: "Perusona Sutōkā Kurabu: TGS2015 Shucchouban @ Sega Busu" (Japanese: ペルソナストーカー倶楽部 TGS2015出張版＠セガブース)	September 30, 2015

== Persora Awards ==
Persona Stalker Club had a regular segment called "Persora-mimi Theater", where the hosts would read mondegreen lyrics submitted by fans. The segment's popularity led to a yearly awards ceremony, the Persora Awards, released on DVD honoring their favorite misheard lyrics. Multiple CDs were released during the show's run with a lyrics booklet listing the misheard lyrics.

=== DVDs ===
Title	Details	Peak chart positions
Title	Details	JPN
Persora Awards	Released: September 30, 2015; Label: Mastard Records; Formats: DVD	14
Persora Awards 2	Released: January 31, 2017; Label: Mastard Records; Formats: DVD	8
Persora Awards 3	Released: November 12, 2018; Label: Mastard Records; Formats: DVD	21

=== Albums ===
Title	Details	Peak chart positions
Title	Details	JPN
Persora: The Golden Best	Released: July 16, 2014; Label: Mastard Records; Formats: CD	36
Persora: The Golden Best 2	Released: February 18, 2015; Label: Mastard Records; Formats: CD	40
Persora: The Golden Best 3	Released: October 5, 2016; Label: Mastard Records; Formats: CD	—
Persora: The Golden Best 4	Released: November 2, 2016; Label: Mastard Records; Formats: CD	—
Persora: The Golden Best 5	Released: October 31, 2018; Label: Mastard Records; Formats: CD	228
