= Persona 6 =

Upcoming video game

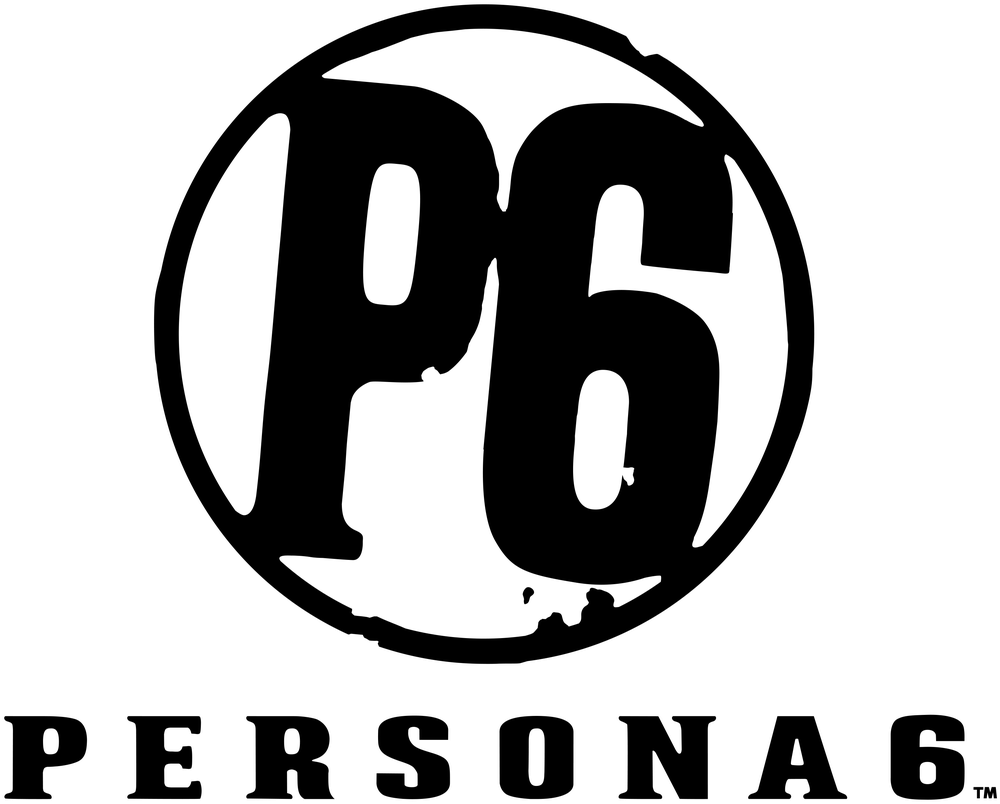
- Developer: P-Studio
- Publisher: Sega: JP: Atlus
- Producer: Kazuhisa Wada
- Artist: Shigenori Soejima
- Series: Persona
- Platforms: Nintendo Switch 2; PlayStation 5; Windows; Xbox Series X/S
- Genres: Role-playing, social simulation
- Mode: Single-player

Persona 6 (Note: Japanese: ペルソナ６, Hepburn: Perusona Shikkusu) is an upcoming role-playing video game developed by P-Studio, an internal division of Atlus, and published by Sega for Nintendo Switch 2, PlayStation 5, Windows and Xbox Series X/S. It will be the seventh main installment of the Persona series, itself a part of the larger Megami Tensei franchise.

Persona 6 will be the first main entry in the series since Persona 2: Eternal Punishment (2000) to not be directed by Katsura Hashino, following his departure from the Persona development team in 2016. Preparatory work for the game began before the worldwide release of Persona 5 in 2017. Full production had commenced by 2021, while the game was formally announced in June 2026.

== Development ==
After the Japanese launch of Persona 5 in 2016, Katsura Hashino, a primary producer at P-Studio and the director of the last three main Persona games, had officially departed the team, citing the aforementioned game as a "turning point" for the series, as well as a desire to pursue new projects away from the franchise. Also in 2016, he established Studio Zero as a development group within Atlus for original projects released by their flagship franchise, Megami Tensei. Atlus USA released a press statement on December 23, 2016, clarifying that while Hashino's preoccupation with developing Metaphor: ReFantazio (2024) with Studio Zero precluded any possible involvement with the Persona series at present, P-Studio was committed to creating further Persona games for satisfying fan demand. Atlus reaffirmed that series character designer Shigenori Soejima and composer Shoji Meguro, remained available to reprise their respective duties for future Persona projects simultaneously with their involvement in Studio Zero and Metaphor: ReFantazio. Meguro departed Atlus' sound team at the end of September 2021 in order to pursue freelance composing work and partake in independent game designing. He publicly committed to his continued involvement with Atlus games, saying he would prioritize full game soundtracks with the publisher. However, he cautioned expectations as to whether he would remain involved with composing for the Persona games.

In May 2023, a placeholder logo used during development for Persona 6 was leaked online. The prominence of green in the logo suggested that the game's aesthetic would heavily derive from it as a thematic color, not dissimilar to the prominence of blue, yellow and red in the presentations of Persona 3, Persona 4 and Persona 5, respectively. While announcing Persona 4 Revival in June 2025, Kazuhisa Wada released a statement reiterating that P-Studio was "actively preparing" for the development of future Persona games in tandem with their recent remakes, and that work was "progressing well" in that regard.

== Release ==
Persona 6 will be the first new main installment in the franchise to be published worldwide by Sega under the Atlus brand following their merger with the developer in 2016. Throughout the early 2020s, Atlus and Sega had begun publishing the main Persona series outside PlayStation consoles since Revelations: Persona in 1999, including ports of prior entries on Windows, Nintendo Switch and Xbox consoles, as well as the full remakes Persona 3 Reload (2024) and Persona 4 Revival (2027) that were released on multiple consoles and PC. In a November 2023 earnings call, Sega Sammy Holdings president Haruki Atami pledged that all future Persona games would prioritize a simultaneous worldwide launch and availability on multiple platforms to meet internal company expectations of selling at least 5 million units of a new game in its first year.

Throughout early June 2026, alleged images and the title treatment for Persona 6 were leaked online and corroborated by insiders on social media, showing early concept illustrations of an unnamed male protagonist character and a female character, as well as Japanese character names. All such images were later taken down by Sega. Persona 6 was officially announced with a teaser trailer on June 7, 2026 during the Xbox Games Showcase. A Nintendo Switch 2 version was announced to release alongside the other platforms during the September 2026 installment of Nintendo Direct.

In early September 2026, achievements for the Windows version of Persona 6, alongside Persona 4 Revival, surfaced through Exophase, an achievement tracker site for Steam titles. The site's owner stated that the leaks may have occurred on Steam's end, where an error in the service's API ended up publicizing the achievements for many unreleased games. The leaked achievements showed unannounced story information, including the setting and story details of Persona 6.

Persona 6 is scheduled to release on Nintendo Switch 2, PlayStation 5, Windows, and Xbox Series X/S. From launch, it will be available on Xbox Game Pass and will support Play Anywhere cross-progression on the latter platforms. Sega confirmed in August 2026 that the game would receive a physical release for PlayStation 5, suggesting the game would release prior to Sony ceasing production of game discs for PlayStation consoles in January 2028.

== Reception ==
=== Pre-Release ===
PC Gamer reported on November 12, 2026 that Persona 6 is among the nominees of Most Wanted's top 20 upcoming games.
