= Persona (franchise) =

Japanese video game franchise

- The logo of Shin Megami Tensei: Persona, the remake of the first game in the series. Each game uses its own font and styling.
- Genres: Role-playing, social simulation
- Developers: Atlus / P-Studio (main series, PQ, PD); Arc System Works (P4A, P4AU)
- Publishers: JP/NA: Atlus, ASCII Corporation; PAL: Deep Silver, Koei, Sega, Square Enix, THQ, NIS America
- Creators: Kouji Okada; Kazuma Kaneko
- Composers: Shoji Meguro; Atsushi Kitajoh; Toshiki Konishi; Ryota Kozuka; Kenichi Tsuchiya
- Platforms: Arcade; Android; iOS; Mobile phone; Nintendo 3DS; Nintendo Switch; Nintendo Switch 2; PlayStation; PlayStation 2; PlayStation 3; PlayStation 4; PlayStation 5; PlayStation Portable; PlayStation Vita; Windows; Xbox 360; Xbox One; Xbox Series X/S
- First release: Revelations: Persona; September 20, 1996
- Latest release: Persona 5: The Phantom X June 26, 2025

Persona, (Note: ペルソナ, Perusona) previously marketed as Shin Megami Tensei: Persona outside of Japan, is a Japanese video game series and media franchise developed by Atlus and owned by Sega. (Note: Other third-party companies such as Ghostlight and NIS America have published games in Europe. Sega assumed North American publishing duties in 2016 under the Atlus brand name, before expanding to European territories in 2019.) Centered on a series of Japanese role-playing video games, Persona was originally conceived as a spin-off from Atlus' Megami Tensei franchise. The first entry in the series, Revelations: Persona, (Note: This game is generally referred to as Persona 1 or just Persona rather than by its full title.) was released in 1996 for the PlayStation. The series has seen several more games since, with the most recent main entry being 2024's Persona 3 Reload, a remake of the 2006 game Persona 3.

Persona began as a spin-off based on the positively received high school setting of Shin Megami Tensei If... (1994). Persona's core features include a group of students as the main cast, a silent protagonist similar to the mainline Megami Tensei franchise, and combat using Personas. Beginning with Persona 3 in 2006, the main series came to focus more on, and become renowned for, the immersive social simulation elements that came with the addition of Social Links, which are directly linked to how Personas evolve. Character designs are by series co-creator Kazuma Kaneko (Persona and the Persona 2 duology) and Shigenori Soejima (Persona 3 onwards). Its overall theme is the exploration of the human psyche and how the characters find their true selves. The series' recurring concepts and design elements draw on Jungian psychology, psychological personas and tarot cards, along with religious, mythological, and literary themes and influences.

Revelations: Persona was the first role-playing Megami Tensei game to be released outside of Japan. Beginning with Persona 2: Eternal Punishment, the English localizations began to remain faithful to the Japanese versions at the insistence of Atlus. The series is highly popular internationally, becoming the best-known Megami Tensei spin-off and establishing Atlus and the Megami Tensei franchise in North America. Following the release of Persona 3 and 4, the series also established a strong following in Europe. The series has since gone on to sell over 30 million copies worldwide, outselling its parent franchise. There have been numerous adaptations, including anime series, films, novelizations, manga, stage plays, radio dramas, art books, and musical concerts.

== Video games ==
Release timeline Main series in bold
1996	**Revelations: Persona**
1997–1998
1999	**2: Innocent Sin**
2000	**2: Eternal Punishment**
2001–2005
2006	**Persona 3**
2007	3 FES
2008	**Persona 4**
2009	Shin Megami Tensei: Persona (PSP)
2009	3 Portable
2010
2011	2: Innocent Sin (PSP)
2012	4 Arena
2012	2: Eternal Punishment (PSP)
2012	4 Golden
2013	4 Arena Ultimax
2014	Q: Shadow of the Labyrinth
2015	4: Dancing All Night
2016	**Persona 5**
2017
2018	3: Dancing in Moonlight
2018	5: Dancing in Starlight
2018	Q2: New Cinema Labyrinth
2019	5 Royal
2020	5 Strikers
2021–2022
2023	5 Tactica
2024	3 Reload
2025	5: The Phantom X
2026
2027	4 Revival
TBA	**Persona 6**

=== Main series ===
- Revelations: Persona is the first entry in the series, and was released in Japan and North America for the PlayStation in 1996. A port to Windows was released in Japan in 1999. The game was later ported to the PlayStation Portable (PSP): it was published in 2009 in Japan and North America as physical and digital releases, and 2010 in Europe as a digital release. Set in the town of Mikage-cho, it follows a group of high school students from St. Hermelin High, who are forced to confront an outbreak of demons in their hometown.
- Persona 2 refers to a duology of games released on the PlayStation in 1999 and 2000.
  - Persona 2: Innocent Sin is the second entry in the series, released in Japan for the PlayStation in 1999. After the success of Persona's PSP port, a port of Innocent Sin was greenlit. For this version, adjustments were made so that it played more like its sequel, along with added features and a new scenario. The port was released in 2011 in all regions. Set in the coastal city of Sumaru, the story follows Tatsuya Suou, a student of Seven Sisters High, as he confronts phenomena generated by reality-altering rumors.
  - Persona 2: Eternal Punishment is the third entry in the main series, released in Japan and North America for the PlayStation in 2000. Like Innocent Sin, it was remade for PSP, and included a new scenario by the game's original writer. The remake released in Japan in 2012, but did not reach the West. The original version was re-released worldwide on PlayStation Network (PSN) in 2013 in response to this. Set shortly after the ending of Innocent Sin, the story follows Maya Amano, a supporting character from the previous game, as she confronts a similar rumor-created threat along with Tatsuya.
- Persona 3 is the fourth entry in the main series. Developed for PlayStation 2, it released in 2006 in Japan, 2007 in North America, and 2008 in Europe. The story takes place in the city of Tatsumi Port Island, following a group of students known as "S.E.E.S." who fight monsters that appear during a time known as the Dark Hour.
  - Persona 3 FES, a director's cut featuring new content and an epilogue, was released in 2007 in Japan and 2008 in North America and Europe.
  - The main portion of FES was later ported to the PSP in Japan in 2009, North America in 2010, and in Europe in 2011 as Persona 3 Portable: it featured a few enhancements such as a female playable character and the ability to control all characters in battle, and some content was adjusted or removed so it could fit on a portable platform. Ports of Persona 3 Portable were released on Nintendo Switch, PlayStation 4, Windows, Xbox One, and Xbox Series X/S on January 19, 2023.
  - Persona 3 Reload is a remake of Persona 3, released for PlayStation 4, PlayStation 5, Windows, Xbox One, and Xbox Series X/S on February 2, 2024, and launched for Nintendo Switch 2 in October 2025. Reload is a recreation of the original game's narrative and functionally updated with numerous gameplay improvements that bring the title in closer parity with succeeding installments of the series. The remake also overhauls the game's presentation with the introduction of a new English voice cast, new story scenarios and additional interactions between characters not featured in either the original Persona 3 or its re-releases. The epilogue of FES was later released as DLC called Episode Aigis.
- Persona 4 is the fifth entry in the main series, released for the PlayStation 2 in 2008 in Japan and North America, and 2009 in Europe. Persona 4 takes place in the rural town of Inaba, where a group of students investigate a series of killings related to a realm known as the Midnight Channel.
  - The success of Persona 3 Portable inspired the creation of a portable, expanded version of Persona 4, titled Persona 4 Golden. As using the PSP would result in cutting too much content, it was instead developed for PlayStation Vita, which allowed for the addition of new features and content. A port of Golden was released for Windows in 2020, with ports for the Nintendo Switch, PlayStation 4, Xbox One, and Xbox Series X/S released on January 19, 2023.
  - Persona 4 Revival is an upcoming remake of Persona 4. In the same vein as Persona 3 Reload, it remakes Persona 4's narrative while adding brand-new content that adds new story scenarios and interactions, content from Persona 4 Golden, and gameplay improvements from newer Atlus titles, in addition to a graphical overhaul. It was announced in June 2025 and due for release in February 18, 2027 for PlayStation 5, Windows, and Xbox Series X/S, with a Nintendo Switch 2 port releasing on May 20th, 2027.
- Persona 5 is the sixth entry in the main series, released for the PlayStation 3 and PlayStation 4. It is set in Tokyo and follows a group of students as they adopt disguises of thieves to tackle the city's corruption and attain freedom from imposed societal pressures. Persona 5 was released in Japan in September 2016, and in North America and Europe in April 2017.
  - Persona 5 Royal, an enhanced version of the game similar to Persona 4 Golden, was released for PlayStation 4 in Japan in 2019 and worldwide the following year. Ports of Royal for Nintendo Switch, PlayStation 5, Windows, Xbox One, and Xbox Series X/S were released in October 2022.
- Persona 6 is the upcoming seventh entry in the main series. It will be released worldwide simultaneously on Nintendo Switch 2, PlayStation 5, Windows and Xbox Series X/S.

=== Spin-offs ===
Persona 3 received a Japan-exclusive spin-off titled Persona 3: The Night Before; (Note: ペルソナ3 ザ・ナイト・ビフォア, Perusona Surī: Za Naito Bifoa) it follows a similar cycle of daytime activities and night time combat as the original game, with one player being chosen as the party leader each night. After its closure in 2008, a new free-to-play browser game titled Persona Ain Soph (Note: ペルソナ アインソフ, Perusona Ain Sofu) was released that year; the gameplay focused on players fusing Personas and confronting a threat known as the Qliphoth. Staying exclusive to Japan, it closed down in June 2010.

A fighting game sequel to Persona 4, Persona 4 Arena, was released in arcades in Japan in 2012. Console versions were released in 2012 in Japan and North America, and 2013 in Europe. A sequel, Persona 4 Arena Ultimax, was similarly released in Japanese arcades in 2013, then released in 2014 in all regions for consoles.

A standalone spin-off for the Nintendo 3DS, Persona Q: Shadow of the Labyrinth, was released worldwide in 2014; it features the full casts of Persona 3 and 4, and is classed by Atlus as an official entry in the Persona canon. A sequel, Persona Q2: New Cinema Labyrinth, saw the addition of the Persona 5 characters and was released in Japan in 2018 and worldwide in 2019.

A rhythm game set after the events of Persona 4 Arena Ultimax, Persona 4: Dancing All Night, was released worldwide in 2015. Two follow-ups to Dancing All Night, Persona 3: Dancing in Moonlight and Persona 5: Dancing in Starlight, were released together in 2018.

A Dynasty Warriors-style action role-playing sequel to Persona 5, Persona 5 Strikers, was released in Japan in 2020 and worldwide the following year. A tactics spin-off of Persona 5, Persona 5 Tactica, was released in November 2023.

Several Persona mobile games have been made in partnership with other Japanese mobile companies such as BBMF. Their first partnership was in 2006 with the development and release of Megami Ibunroku Persona: Ikū no Tō-hen, a 3D dungeon crawler set during the events of the first Persona game. The companies later collaborated on two mobile games based on the Persona 2 games: Persona 2: Innocent Sin - Lost Memories (Note: ペルソナ2 罪 ロストメモリーズ, Perusona Tsū: Tsumi Rosuto Memorīzu) in 2007, and Persona 2: Eternal Punishment - Infinity Mask (Note: ペルソナ2 罰 インフィニティマスク, Perusona Tsū: Batsu Infiniti Masuku) in 2009. Both games carried over the basic gameplay functions of the original games tailored for mobile phones.

Many mobile spin-offs are related to Persona 3: there is an RPG side-story titled Persona 3 Em, (Note: ペルソナ3エム, Perusona Surī Emu) an action game prequel set ten years prior to Persona 3 titled Aegis: The First Mission, and an alternate version of Persona 3 featuring different characters titled Persona 3 Social. (Note: ペルソナ3ソーシャル, Perusona Surī Sōsharu) Multiple Persona 3-themed puzzle games have also been developed. An online mobile RPG set around the high school featured in Persona 3, titled Persona Mobile Online, (Note: ペルソナ モバイル オンライン, Perusona Mobairu Onrain) was released in 2009. Persona 4 likewise received a mobile card game spin-off, titled Persona 4 The Card Battle. (Note: ペルソナ4 ザ・カードバトル, Perusona Fō Za Kādo Batoru)

A mobile spin-off for Persona 5 entitled Persona 5: The Phantom X was released in June 2025, developed by Black Wings Game Studio and published by Perfect World Games.

== Common elements ==
=== Gameplay ===
Screenshots from Persona 4 Golden featuring a battle against Shadows using a Persona (above) and the growth of Social Links (below). These mechanics have appeared across multiple entries, forming a core part of the series.

The gameplay of the Persona series revolves around combat against various enemy types: Demons, Shadows and Personas. Main combat takes place during dungeon crawling segments within various locations. The way battles initiate varies between random encounters (Persona, Persona 2) or running into models representing enemy groups (Persona 3 onwards). Battles are governed by a turn-based system, where the player party and enemies each attack the opposing side. Actions in battle include standard physical attacks using short-range melee or long-range projectile weapons, magical attacks, using items, guarding, and under certain conditions escaping from battles. During battle, either side can strike an enemy's weakness, which deals more damage than other attacks. Starting with Persona 3, landing a critical hit or striking an enemy's weakness grants the character an extra turn (called a One More) and knocks the enemy down. If all enemies are knocked down, the party can perform an "All Out Attack", with all party members attacking at once and dealing high damage. Each party member is manually controlled by the player in all but one Persona title: in Persona 3, all the party apart from the main character are controlled by an AI-based command system. The general gameplay has remained consistent across all Persona games.

Each Persona game also includes unique elements. In Persona, battles take place on a grid-based battlefield, with characters' and enemies' movements dictated by their placement on the battlefield. This system was abandoned for the Persona 2 games: the party has free movement across the battlefield, and is assigned a set of moves which can be changed in the menu during and in between battles. In Persona and Persona 3, there is a lunar phase tied to gameplay, time progression, and the plot. In Persona 4, this was changed to a weather-based system, where changes in the weather keyed to the story affected enemy behavior. Persona 5 introduces elements such as platforming and stealth gameplay to dungeon exploration. The All-Out Attack can be initiated in a "Hold-Up" session, triggered when all enemies are knocked down.

==== Personas ====
A defining aspect of the series is the use of the "Persona", which are physical manifestations of a person's psyche and subconscious used for combat. The main Personas for the cast used up to Persona 3 were inspired by Greco-Roman mythology. Persona 4's were based on Japanese deities; while Persona 5 used characters inspired by fictional and historical outlaws and thieves. The summoning ritual for Personas in battle varies throughout the series: in early games, the party gains the ability to summon through a short ritual after playing a parlor game; in Persona 3, they fire a gun-like device called an Evoker at their head to overcome their cowardice; in Persona 4, they summon their Personas by destroying Tarot cards; in Persona 5, they are summoned through the removal of the characters' masks.

Personas are used for types of physical attack and magical attacks, along with actions such as healing and curing or inflicting status effects. For all Persona games, all playable characters start out with an initial Persona, which can evolve into other Personas through story-based events and use during battle. In multiple Persona games, two or more Personas can be summoned at once to perform a powerful Fusion Spell. In Persona 3, 4 and 5, only the main character can wield and change between multiple Personas; the other characters use a single Persona. During the course of the game, the player acquires more Personas through a system of Skill Cards, represented by Major Arcana Tarot cards. Each skill card represents a different Persona family, which in turn hold their own abilities inherent to that family. Multiple Personas can be fused together to create a new Persona with improved and inherited abilities: these range from fusing two Personas in the Persona 2 duology to up to twelve in Persona 4. Starting with Persona 3, the main protagonist of each game has an ability known as "Wild Card", an ability to summon multiple Personas represented by the Fool Arcana.

==== Social links and negotiation ====
"Social Links" is a system introduced in Persona 3 that is a form of character interaction tied to the growth of Personas. During their time outside battle, the main character can interact with and grow a particular Social Link, which acts as an independent character growth system tied to a Persona family or Arcanum. As the main character's relationship with the character representing a Social Link grows, its rank is raised and more powerful Personas related to the Social Link's assigned Arcanum can be summoned and fused. Attributes related to the main character's social life can also be used to improve their Persona abilities, such as their academic abilities and social aptitude. An enhanced version of the Social Link system, known as "Confidants", appeared in Persona 5.

In Persona, the Persona 2 duology, and Persona 5, there is also a "Negotiation" mechanic carried over from the Megami Tensei series, in which player characters can talk with enemies and provoke certain actions depending on their dialogue choices. Some responses yield Skill Cards for use in creating new Personas. Negotiation was removed from Persona 3 and Persona 4, although Atlus staff considered the Social Link system and aspects of Persona fusion to be a "disguised" version of it. In Persona 5, they can be initiated during a "Hold Up" session; Shadows can be persuaded to join the party as a new Persona if the Negotiation is successful, the player does not already have them, and is at an appropriate experience level.

=== Setting and themes ===
The Persona series takes place in modern-day Japan and focuses on a group of high school students, with the exception to this being Eternal Punishment, which focused on a group of adults. The setting has been described as urban fantasy, with extraordinary events happening in otherwise normal locations. The typical setting used is a city, with a noted exception being the rural town setting of Persona 4. Although they are typically stand-alone games that only share thematic elements, the Persona games share a continuity, with elements from previous games turning up in later ones. Persona and the Persona 2 games shared narrative elements which were concluded with Eternal Punishment, so Persona 3 started out with a fresh setting and characters. The first in the series is Persona, set in the year 1996. This is followed by the events of Innocent Sin and Eternal Punishment in 1999. At the end of Innocent Sin, the main characters rewrite events to avert the destruction of Earth, creating the Eternal Punishment reality, with the original reality becoming an isolated Other Side. Persona 3 and subsequent games stem from Eternal Punishment. Persona 3 is set from 2009 to 2010, and Persona 4 is set from 2011 to 2012. The Persona 4 Arena games and Dancing All Night take place in the months following Persona 4. In contrast, Persona 5 is set in a non-specific year referred to as "20XX", while Strikers is set several months after the events of Persona 5. The Persona Q series takes place in a separate enclosed world in which the characters of Persona 3, 4, and 5 are drawn into from their respective time periods. Dialogue in Q2 also suggests that Persona 5 takes place only a few years after 4.

A central concept for the series is the collective unconscious, a place generated by the hearts of humanity and from which Personas are born. According to the official Persona Club P3 book, the collective unconscious was generated by the primitive life on Earth as a means of containing the spiritual essence of Nyx, a space-born being whose presence would cause the death of all life on Earth. Her body was damaged by the impact and became the moon, while her psyche was left on the surface and locked away at the heart of the collective unconscious. The fragments of Nyx's psyche, known as "Shadows", are both a threat and a crucial part of humanity's existence. To further help defend against hostile Shadows, people generated the deities that exist within the collective unconscious, many of which manifest as Personas. Nyx appears in Persona 3 as the antagonist. The major dungeon locations in each game are generated by the latent wishes and desires of humans and are generally used by another force for their own ends. A recurring location appearing in most of the games is the "Velvet Room", a place between reality and unconsciousness created by Philemon that changes form depending on the psyche of its current guest. Its inhabitants, led by an enigmatic old man called Igor, aid the main characters by helping them hone their Persona abilities. While normally inaccessible and invisible to all except those who forged a contract with the room, others can be summoned alongside the guest, intentionally or otherwise.

The main character of each Persona game is a silent protagonist representing the player, with a manner described by the series' director as "silent and cool". When the writer for new story content in Eternal Punishment's PSP version wished for the main character to have spoken dialogue, this was vetoed as it went against the series tradition. Two recurring characters generated by the collective unconscious are Philemon and Nyarlathotep, the respective representatives of the positive and negative traits of humanity. In Innocent Sin, the two reveal that they are engaged in a proxy contest as to whether humanity can embrace its contradictory feelings and find a higher purpose before destroying itself. Philemon makes appearances in later Persona games as a blue butterfly. Many of the major antagonists in the series are personifications of death generated by the human subconscious. The central theme of the Persona series is exploration of the human psyche and the main characters discovering their true selves. The stories generally focus on the main cast's interpersonal relationships and psychologies. There is also an underlying focus on "the human soul".

Many of the concepts and characters within the series (Personas, Shadows, Philemon) use Jungian psychology and archetypes. A recurring motif are the "masks" people wear during everyday life, which ties back to their Personas. This motif was more overtly expressed in Persona 5 through the main casts' use of masks in their thief guises. The dual lives of the main casts are directly inspired by these themes. Each game also includes specific themes and motifs. Persona 2 focuses on the effect of rumors on the fabric of reality (referred to by the developers as "the power of Kotodama"); Persona 3 employs themes involving depression and the darkness within people; Persona 4 focuses on how gossip and the media influences people's views of others; and Persona 5 shows how the main characters pursue personal freedom in a restrictive modern society. Zhang Cheng from The Paper thought the Persona 3, 4 and 5 regarded emotions and bonds as the ultimate weapon against alienation in postmodern society, and calls on everyone to become positive people. A recurring element in the earlier entries is ""The Butterfly Dream"", a famous story by the Chinese philosopher Zhuang Zhou. It ties in with the series' themes, and also with Philemon's frequent appearances as a butterfly. Philemon's original appearance was based on Zhuang Zhou. The character Nyarlathotep is based on the character of the same name from H. P. Lovecraft's Cthulhu Mythos, and the Mythos as a whole is frequently referenced in Persona 2. The Velvet Room was based on the Black Lodge from Twin Peaks, while Igor and his assistants are all named after characters from Mary Shelley's novel Frankenstein and its adaptations.

== Development ==
The Persona series was first conceived after the release of Shin Megami Tensei If... for the Super Famicom. As the high school setting of If... had been positively received, Atlus decided to create a dedicated subseries focusing on the inner struggles of young adults. The focus on high school life was also decided upon due to the experiences of the series' creators, Kouji Okada and Kazuma Kaneko: according to them, as nearly everyone experiences being a student at some point in their lives, it was something everyone could relate to, representing a time of both learning and personal freedom. In their view, this approach helped players accept the series' themes and the variety of ideas included in each title. Kaneko in particular tried to recreate his experiences and the impact it had on him during his time with the series. The main concept behind the first game was a Megami Tensei title that was more approachable for new and casual players than the main series. The abundance of casual games on the PlayStation reinforced this decision. The game's title, Megami Ibunroku, (Note: 女神異聞録; lit. "Goddess' Odyssey") represented the game's status as a direct spin-off from the series. It was later dropped to further define Persona as a standalone series. After the success of Persona, Innocent Sin began development, retaining many of the original staff. During the writing of Innocent Sin, it was decided that the world of Persona 2 needed a different perspective than that of the current protagonist. This decision laid the groundwork for Eternal Punishment. Following this, the Persona series entered a hiatus while focus turned to other projects, including Shin Megami Tensei III: Nocturne.

The conceptual Persona 3 was submitted to Atlus in 2003 by Katsura Hashino, who had worked as a designer for multiple Megami Tensei games and had been the director for Nocturne. Gaining Atlus' approval of the concept, development started in the same year, after the completion of Nocturne and the Digital Devil Saga duology. Persona 3 was part of Atlus' push to expand their player base outside of Japan. Ideas were being passed around about Persona 4, but the game did not begin official development until after the release of Persona 3. Preparations for Persona 5's development began in 2010. The team decided to shift towards more challenging story themes, saying that the shift would be more drastic than that experienced with Persona 3. Persona 4 Arena and its sequel were the first non-RPG collaborative project in the series: its success inspired the creation of both Persona Q and Dancing All Night.

The first three Persona games were developed by Atlus' internal R&D1 studio, the studio responsible for the mainline Megami Tensei games. Beginning with Persona 3, a dedicated team originally referred to as the 2nd Creative Production Department began handling development for the series. The team was later renamed P-Studio in 2012. Hashino remained in charge of the studio until the Japanese release of Persona 5 in 2016, when he moved to found a new department, Studio Zero, to work on non-Persona projects. Aside from Atlus, other developers have helped develop entries in the Persona series. During the pre-production stage of Persona 4 Arena, Hashino approached Arc System Works after being impressed by their work on the BlazBlue series. For Dancing All Night, development was initially handled by Dingo, but due to quality concerns Atlus took over primary development with Dingo being retained as a supporting developer.

=== Art design ===
Promotional artwork for Persona 3 showing some of the main cast and a Persona. It was created by Shigenori Soejima, who has been the series character designer since.

The two character artists for the Persona series are Kazuma Kaneko, a central artist in the main Megami Tensei series who designed characters for the first three Persona games, and Shigenori Soejima, who worked in a secondary capacity alongside Kaneko and took Kaneko's place as the character designer from Persona 3 onwards. While designing the characters for Persona, Kaneko was inspired by multiple notable celebrities and fictional characters of the time, along with members of Atlus staff. In Persona and Innocent Sin, the main characters all wore the same school uniforms, so Kaneko differentiated them using accessories. For Eternal Punishment, the main cast were adults, so Kaneko needed to rethink his design procedure. Eventually, he adopted the concept of ordinary adults, and gave them designs that would stand out in-game.

Soejima's first major work for the series was working on side characters for Persona 2 alongside Kaneko. Kaneko put Soejima in charge of the series' art direction after Persona 2 as Kaneko did not want to imprint his drawing style on the Persona series, and also wanted Soejima to gain experience. Soejima felt a degree of pressure when he was given his new role, as the series had accumulated a substantial following during Kaneko's tenure. In a later interview, Soejima said that although he respected and admired Kaneko, he never consciously imitated the latter's work, and eventually settled into the role of pleasing the fans of the Persona series, approaching character designs with the idea of creating something new rather than referring back to Kaneko's work. For his character designs, Soejima uses real people he has met or seen, looking at what their appearance says about their personality. If his designs come too close to the people he has seen, he does a rough sketch while keeping the personality of the person in mind. For his work on Persona Q, his first time working with a deformed Chibi style due to its links with the Etrian Odyssey series, Soejima took into account what fans felt about the characters. A crucial part of his design technique was looking at what made a character stand out, then adjusting those features so they remained recognizable even with the redesign.

Starting with Persona 3, each Persona game has been defined by a different aesthetic and key color. It is one of the first artistic decisions made by the team: Persona 3 has a dark atmosphere and serious characters, so the primary color was chosen as blue to reflect these and the urban setting. In contrast, Persona 4 has a lighter tone and characters but also sports a murder-mystery plot, so the color yellow was chosen to represent both the lighter tones and to evoke a "warning" signal. According to Soejima, blue was the "color of adolescence", and yellow was the "color of happiness". For Persona 5, the color chosen was red, to convey a harsh feeling in contrast to the previous Persona games and tie in with the game's story themes. Its art style was described as a natural evolution from where Persona 4 left off.

=== Music ===
The music of the Persona series has been handled by multiple composers. The one most associated with the series is Shoji Meguro, who began working on Persona shortly after he joined Atlus in 1995. His very first composition for the game was "Aria of the Soul", the theme for the Velvet Room that became a recurring track throughout the series. During his initial work on the series, Meguro felt restricted by the limited storage space of the PlayStation's disc system, and so when he began composing for Persona 3, which allowed for sound streaming due to increased hardware capacity, he was able to fully express his musical style. His main worry for his music in Persona 3 and 4 was the singers' pronunciation of the English lyrics. He was unable to work on the Persona 2 games as he was tied up with other projects, including Maken X. Meguro also served as the lead composer in Persona 5, using elements of acid jazz, being inspired in particular by British band Jamiroquai, and the game's themes for inspiration to achieve the right mood. The music for Innocent Sin and Eternal Punishment was handled by Toshiko Tasaki, Kenichi Tsuchiya, and Masaki Kurokawa. Tsuchiya had originally done minor work on Persona, and found composing for the games a strenuous experience. Spin-offs, such as the Persona Q and Dancing subseries, are usually handled by other Atlus composers such as Atsushi Kitajoh, Toshiki Konishi, and Ryota Kozuka.

== Release ==
The series consists of twenty games, not counting re-releases and mobile games. Persona was the first role-playing entry in the Megami Tensei franchise to be released outside of Japan, as previous entries had been considered ineligible due to possibly controversial content. As examples of this content were in a milder form for Persona, the restrictions did not apply. According to Atlus, Persona and its sequel were to test player reactions to the Megami Tensei series outside of Japan. The greater majority of Persona games were either first released on or exclusive to PlayStation platforms. This trend was broken with the release of Persona Q for the 3DS in 2014. All the Persona games have been published by Atlus in Japan and North America. An exception in Japan was the Windows port of Persona, which was published by ASCII Corporation. After 2016, due to Atlus USA's merger with Sega of America, Sega took over North American publishing duties, although the Atlus brand remained intact. Since then, Atlus has been releasing ports of the main Persona games for non-PlayStation platforms, beginning with the release of Persona 4 Golden on Windows in 2020, which marked the first time a numbered entry in the series released for PC worldwide. Sega would also assist Atlus in porting Persona 5 Royal and Persona 3 Portable to Windows, in addition to Nintendo Switch, PlayStation 4, PlayStation 5, Xbox One and Xbox Series X/S throughout 2022 and 2023. Persona 3 Reload, a remake of Persona 3 (2006), was launched in 2024 for PlayStation 4, PlayStation 5, Windows, Xbox One and Xbox Series X/S, making it the first main entry in the franchise to both receive a worldwide simultaneous release, as well as the first to be available on non-PlayStation formats from launch. In a quarterly earnings report from November 2023, SEGA Sammy president Haruki Atami suggested that all future Persona games going forward would follow a similar release and availability cadence in order to meet company expectations of selling at least 5 million units in a new game's first year.

Due to the company not having a European branch, Atlus has generally given publishing duties to other third-party publishers with branches in Europe. This frequently results in a gap between North American and European release dates ranging from a few months to a year or more. For Persona 3, Atlus gave publishing duties to Koei. For Persona 4, European publishing was handled by Square Enix. Persona 4 Arena was originally published in Europe by Zen United after a long delay, but the digital rights were eventually returned to Atlus, resulting in the game being removed from PSN. Atlus ended up re-publishing the digital PlayStation version in Europe. They had previously digitally published the PSP port of Persona in Europe and Australia. Arena Ultimax was published in Europe by Sega, who had recently purchased Atlus' parent company. It was speculated that this could lead to a new trend that would shorten the release gap between North America and Europe. A regular publishing partner was Ghostlight, whose relations with Atlus went back to the European release of Nocturne. A more recent partner was NIS America, which published Persona 4 Golden, Persona Q, and Dancing All Night. Atlus' partnership with NIS America ended in 2016, with NIS America citing difficulties with the company since its acquisition by Sega as reasons for the split. As part of their statement, NIS America said that Atlus had become "very picky" about European partners, selecting those which could offer the highest minimal sales guarantee on their products. Sega of America and Atlus USA eventually entered into a partnership with European publishing company Deep Silver to publish multiple games in the region, including Persona 5.

=== Localization ===
The localizations for the Persona series are generally handled by translator Yu Namba of Atlus USA, who also handles localization for multiple other Megami Tensei games. Another prominent staff member was Nich Maragos, who worked with Namba on multiple Persona games until moving to Nintendo of America prior to 2015. The localization of Persona was handled by a small team, which put a lot of pressure on them as they needed to adjust the game for Western audiences: the changes implemented included altering names, changing the appearance of characters, and removing numerous cultural references. An entire alternate main quest was also removed. After Persona, it was decided that future Persona games should be as faithful as possible to their original releases. Namba's first localization project for the series was Eternal Punishment. For the release of Innocent Sin, there was a debate over whether to release it, as it contained potentially controversial content including allusions to Nazism. In the end, due to staff and resource shortages, Innocent Sin was passed over for localization in favor of its sequel Eternal Punishment. Later, when the company developed the PSP ports, the team released the ports of Persona and Innocent Sin overseas so fans attracted by Persona 3 and 4 would be able to easily catch up with the rest of the series. The localization for Persona was completely redone, reverting all the previous altered content and restoring all previously cut content. The port of Eternal Punishment was not localized due to "unusual circumstances", so the company released the original version on PSN instead.

For the localizations of Persona 3 and 4, the team incorporated as much of the original content as possible, such as using Japanese honorifics and keeping the game's currency as yen rather than changing it. As a general rule, they incorporate cultural elements from the original versions unless they would not be understood by the player, such as with certain jokes. Nevertheless, some changes had to be made. In one instance, the character Mitsuru Kirijo was originally an English speaker, but her second language for the localized version was changed to French due to her cultured appearance. School tests also needed to be changed due to similar language-based issues. The Social Links were originally called "Community", (Note: コミュニティ, Komyuniti) but this was changed as the word "Community" had a very specific meaning in English. The new name was inspired by the way the character Igor made reference to the concept using words such as "society" and "bonds". Some in-game Easter egg references were also changed: in Persona 3 references to the larger Megami Tensei series by a character in an in-game MMORPG were changed to reference earlier Persona games, while mentions of a fictional detective in Persona 4 were altered to reference the Kuzunoha family from Eternal Punishment and the Devil Summoner series. Character names have also needed adjustment, such as the stage name of Persona 4 character Rise Kujikawa, and the way characters referred to each other was adjusted to appeal more to a western audience. Persona 5 was also localized in this fashion.

The localized English names of games have also been altered. The banner title for Persona was changed from Megami Ibunroku to Revelations, principally because the team thought the latter name sounded "cool". The Revelations title was removed for Innocent Sin and Eternal Punishment. After the successful release of Nocturne, the "Shin Megami Tensei" moniker was added to the series title to help with Western marketing. This has not been the case for some games: Persona 4 Arena's original title, Persona 4: The Ultimate in Mayonaka Arena, was shortened as it sounded "awkward", and the "Shin Megami Tensei" moniker was dropped as it would have made the title too long, which has been applied to every game in the series since. The same change was made for Persona 4 Golden and Persona 5 Royal, with the team dropping "The" that was in the Japanese title because it would have sounded "odd" in English-speaking regions.

== Reception ==
Aggregate review scores
Game	Metacritic
Revelations: Persona	78/100 (PS); 78/100 (PSP)
Persona 2: Innocent Sin	75/100 (PSP)
Persona 2: Eternal Punishment	83/100 (PS)
Persona 3	86/100; 89/100 (FES); 89/100 (Portable); 89/100 (Reload)
Persona 4	90/100; 93/100 (Golden)
Persona 5	93/100; 95/100 (Royal)

The first Persona was referred to at the time as a sleeper hit, and the success of it and Eternal Punishment helped establish both Atlus and the Megami Tensei franchise in North America. In Europe, the series did not become established prior to the release of Persona 3 and 4, both of which were highly successful in the region. According to Atlus CEO Naoto Hiraoka, the main turning point for the franchise was the release of Persona 3, which was a commercial success and brought the series to the attention of the mainstream gaming community. Persona 4 received an even better reception. The Persona series' success has allowed Atlus to build a strong player base outside of Japan, contributing to the success of other games such as Catherine. (Note: While primarily referring to and focusing on the European market, Hiraoka is speaking of the Persona series in general in the cited instances.)

The Persona series has been referred to as the most popular spin-off from the Megami Tensei franchise, gaining notoriety and success in its own right. James Whitbrook of Io9 commented that while "here in the west, we've got plenty of awesome urban fantasy, especially from a YA perspective. But what makes Persona interesting is that it's the familiar concept of urban fantasy, the balance of the mundane 'normal' life of the protagonists and the problems they have there with the fantastical nature of the supernatural world that lies beneath all that, from a Japanese perspective. Over here, that's much less common, and the way the series portrays urban fantasy through that lens is what makes it so different, especially from what you would normally expect from Japanese RPGs." Nintendo Power, in an article concerning the Megami Tensei series, cited the Persona series' "modern-day horror stories" and "teams of Japanese high-school kids" as the perfect example of the franchise. Persona was mentioned in 1999 by GameSpot's Andrew Vestal as a game that deserved attention despite not aging well, saying "Examining Persona reveals three of the traits that make the series so popular—and unique—amongst RPG fans: demonology, negotiation, and psychology". The game has been named as a cult classic. Persona 3 was named by RPGamer as the greatest RPG of the past decade in 2009, and RPGFan listed Persona 3 and 4 in second and fourth place, respectively, in their similar 2011 list. Persona 3 was listed by Gamasutra as one of the 20 essential RPGs for players of the genre. Persona 4 was also listed by Famitsu as one of the greatest games of all time in a 2010 list.

As well as gaining critical acclaim, the series has been the subject of controversy in the West over its content. The first instance of controversy surrounded the localized banner title of the original Persona, which raised concerns due to its religious implications. Kurt Katala, writing for 1UP.com in 2006 about the controversial content of the Megami Tensei franchise as a whole, mentioned Innocent Sin's references to homosexuality, schoolyard violence, and Nazism, considering them possible reasons why the game had yet to be released outside of Japan. In 1UP.com's 2007 game awards, which ran in the March 2008 issue of Electronic Gaming Monthly, Persona 3 was given the "Most controversial game that created no controversy" award: the writers said "Rockstar's Hot Coffee sex scandal and Bully's boy-on-boy kissing's got nothing on this PS2 role-player's suicide-initiated battles or subplot involving student–teacher dating". Persona 4 has in turn been examined by multiple sites over its portrayal of character sexuality and gender identity.

Particular controversy surrounds the three mainline titles with Katsura Hashino at the head—Persona 3, Persona 4, and Persona 5—as players and journalists observed notable distasteful depictions of homosexuality within the trio of games. Persona 3 features a non-optional interaction with a female-presenting NPC that attempts to flirt with the game's male main characters, before being observed to have a small amount of facial hair, leading the repulsed characters and the player to believe that this NPC is a transgender woman. Persona 5 also has a string of comedic non-optional interactions with two seemingly gay men which were the subject of extensive criticism, and were then altered in the Western localization of Persona 5 Royal. However, the scenes are still present and the issues audiences had were not fully alleviated. Persona 4 has been subject to various criticisms for its depictions of potentially queer characters. Major character Kanji Tatsumi is seen as potentially being bisexual or gay, leading to him being made the brunt of many homophobic jokes and jabs from another main character, Yosuke Hanamura. The writing of Naoto Shirogane has been criticized in regards to her relationship with gender identity and her character arc which involves embracing her biological gender of female after previously identifying as male due to concerns surrounding treatment of women in the police force.

By June 2026, the series had sold over 30 million copies worldwide.

== Related media ==
=== Anime ===
The first anime adaptation of the Persona series, a television series based on Persona 3 titled Persona: Trinity Soul, aired in 2008. Trinity Soul takes place in an alternate setting ten years after Persona 3, making it a non-canon entry in the franchise. It was animated by A-1 Pictures, directed by Jun Matsumoto, written by a team that included Yasuyuki Muto, Shogo Yasukawa, and Shinsuke Onishi, and composed for by Taku Iwasaki. Its characters were designed by Soejima and Yuriko Ishii, while Persona designs were done by Nobuhiko Genma. It was distributed internationally by NIS America.

An anime adaptation of the original Persona 4, Persona 4: The Animation, aired in 2011. The 25-episode series was produced by AIC ASTA and directed by Seiji Kishi. In 2014, a series based on Persona 4 Golden, titled Persona 4: The Golden Animation, was produced by A-1 Pictures. This series, which retains the cast of the original adaptation, dramatizes the new material included in Persona 4 Golden, focusing on the protagonist's encounters with new character Marie.

A standalone prequel anime created by A-1 Pictures, Persona 5 The Animation: The Day Breakers, was released in September 2016 prior to the Japanese release of the game. A full anime series based on Persona 5, Persona 5: The Animation, aired in 2018.

The original Persona 4 anime series was made into a condensed film adaptation titled Persona 4: The Animation - The Factor of Hope; it was released in Japanese cinemas in 2012. Persona 3 has also been adapted into a series of anime films produced by AIC ASTA and featuring staff from Persona 4: The Animation, released in cinemas in Japan and licensed for release overseas by Aniplex. The four films are titled #1 Spring of Birth, #2 Midsummer Knight's Dream, #3 Falling Down, and #4 Winter of Rebirth. They were released from 2013 to 2016. For both Persona 4: The Animation and the Persona 3 film series, one of the main concerns was the portrayal of the lead characters, which were originally dictated by player actions.

=== Other adaptations ===
Persona was adapted into an eight-issue manga series titled Megami Ibunroku Persona, originally serialized in 1996 and later reissued in 2009. A second spin-off manga, Persona: Tsumi to Batsu, (Note: ペルソナ 罪と罰; lit. Persona: Sin and Punishment) was released to tie in with the release of the Persona 2 games. Set within the same setting of the Persona 2 games, it follows a separate story. In its 2011 reissue, new material was added that connected the manga to the events of Innocent Sin. Persona 3, Persona 4, and Persona 5 have all received their own manga adaptations. Another manga based on Persona Q was also serialized: two separate manga storylines, based on the two storylines featured in the game, were written and dubbed Side:P3 and Side:P4. Multiple novels based on Persona 3 and 4 have also been released.

Six stage plays based on Persona 3 have been produced under the banner Persona 3: The Weird Masquerade. They received limited runs and featured separate performances for the male and female versions of the game's protagonists. Persona 4 was also adapted into two stage plays, both produced by Marvelous AQL and receiving limited runs in 2012: Visualive and Visualive the Evolution. A stage play based on Persona 4 Arena was likewise given a limited run in December 2014, and one based on Persona 4 Arena Ultimax ran in July 2016. Beginning in 2019, a series of four plays based on Persona 5 were produced, titled Persona 5 The Stage. They received DVD releases and later were released on Crunchyroll. Persona 3 Reload is currently getting its own stage play, Persona 3 Lunation The Act. The first act of the stage play runs from July 6th to July 13th, 2025, at the Theatre G-Rosso. This stage play will only include the male protagonist, who will be played by Mizuki Umetsu. It will be directed by Makoto Kimura;

Atlus has created or hosted media dedicated to the Persona series. A dedicated magazine originally ran for ten issues between 2011 and 2012, and has been irregularly revived since then. An official talk show released on the official Persona website and Niconico, Persona Stalker Club, began in February 2014. Hosted by freelance writer Mafia Kajita and actress Tomomi Isomura, it was designed to deepen the connection between Atlus and the Persona fanbase. Concerts featuring music from the Persona series have also been performed, and some have received commercial releases on home media in Japan. Action figures and merchandise such as clothing have also been produced.

The series was also represented in the 2018 crossover fighting game Super Smash Bros. Ultimate with the April 2019 downloadable content (DLC) inclusion of Joker, the protagonist of Persona 5. Along with him, a Persona-themed stage, eleven musical tracks from the series, and Mii costumes of Morgana, Teddie, and the main protagonists from Persona 3 and 4 were also featured.

In June 2022, as part of the series' 25th anniversary, Sega expressed in an interview with IGN, their desire to expand the Persona series and other Atlus properties into live-action film and television, as had been done with their flagship property, Sonic the Hedgehog and its 2020 film adaptation. Toru Nakahara, Sega's lead producer on the Sonic the Hedgehog films and the Netflix animated series Sonic Prime, stated of Atlus' games that, "Stories like those from the Persona franchise really resonate with our fans and we see an opportunity to expand the lore like no one has seen—or played—before". Joker from Persona 5 makes a cameo in Sega's theatrical production logo, which debuted in the aforementioned Sonic the Hedgehog film adaptation as the star Paramount's Cinematic Universe.

In 2023, actors Jun Shison and Haruna Kawaguchi were appointed as official ambassadors for the Persona series, to appear in commercials and other promotional campaigns.

In June 2026, Variety reported that a live-action series based on Persona was in development from Story Kitchen and 21 Laps Entertainment with Christopher Monfette as showrunner. It will be released on Netflix.

== See also ==
- List of Megami Tensei media
