= Persona 4 Revival =

Upcoming video game

- Developer: P-Studio
- Publishers: WW: Sega; JP: Atlus
- Director: Daisuke Yajima
- Producers: Atsushi Nomura; Kazuhisa Wada
- Artists: Hanako Oribe; Akane Kabayashi; Shigenori Soejima
- Composer: Ryota Kozuka (Note: Including rearrangements of original score by Shoji Meguro)
- Series: Persona
- Platforms: PlayStation 5; Windows; Xbox Series X/S; Nintendo Switch 2
- Release: PS5, Win, XSX/S; February 18, 2027; Nintendo Switch 2; May 20, 2027
- Genres: Role-playing, social simulation
- Mode: Single-player

Persona 4 Revival (Note: Japanese: ペルソナ4 リバイバル, Hepburn: Perusona Fō Ribaibaru) is an upcoming role-playing video game developed by P-Studio and published by Atlus. It is a remake of Persona 4 Golden (2012), itself an expanded version of Persona 4 (2008), the fifth main installment of the Persona series.

As with the original game, the protagonist is a high school student who moves to the fictional Japanese countryside town of Inaba. During his year-long stay, he and a group of friends are entangled in an investigation into mysterious murders; in doing so, he begins to harness the power of Persona, a physical manifestation of one's psyche that is strengthened in battle by forging bonds with others, and finds out about the existence of the mysterious "Midnight Channel".

Following the Persona franchise's push into global popularity with the release of Persona 5 (2016), Atlus had expressed interest in fully remaking their older titles for modern platforms, including Persona 4. The project entered development amidst the success of their previous remake, Persona 3 Reload (2024). The game was officially announced in June 2025. Revival is a faithful reproduction of Persona 4 Golden's story, enhanced both graphically and mechanically to bring the title in parity with Persona 5 Royal and Persona 3 Reload, alongside the adjacent game Metaphor: ReFantazio (2024), before the release of Persona 6. Ryota Kozuka, who had composed music for the original Persona 4, returned to compose new music, which includes rearranged tracks from Shoji Meguro's original soundtrack, for Persona 4 Revival, while vocalist Shiori Sasaki will perform the vocal tracks.

Persona 4 Revival is scheduled to release for PlayStation 5, Windows and Xbox Series X/S on February 18, 2027. A Nintendo Switch 2 version will be released on May 20, 2027.

== Gameplay ==
Persona 4 Revival retains the game's characteristic hybrid of traditional role-playing and social simulation gameplay, but is overhauled aesthetically, graphically, and mechanically to integrate systems and features that were created for subsequent entries since the original Persona 4's release, specifically deriving from quality-of-life improvements first implemented in Persona 5 (2016) and Royal (2019), Persona 3 Reload, and the adjacent game Metaphor: ReFantazio (both 2024). Revival is an adaptation of Persona 4 Golden, retaining that version's narrative and gameplay additions from the beginning, as opposed to Reload, which left out some of the additional content of Persona 3's enhanced releases. Among the changes to the user interface, a minimap is now displayed above the player's current area when roaming Inaba outside school, marking important locations they can visit such as shops, the job board and restaurants, among other locales. To initiate or advance Social Link routes during the daytime, the player can now view texts from the protagonist's phone as with the direct messages in Persona 5, and respond to characters who are available to meet with in a given period.

Within the TV World, the dungeons have been partially modified and enhanced with new features. When confronting Shadows, the protagonist is able to directly block their interception, leaving the Shadow open to attack whereby the player can gain a Player Advantage, or giving the party enough time to evade them, with the ability to sprint within dungeons also carrying over from Persona 5 and Persona 3 Reload. In battle, the Baton Pass ability returns from both of the aforementioned games, enabling the player to tag in other party members after exploiting an enemy's elemental weakness or landing a critical hit to continue an offensive chain. Revival introduces two new abilities during encounters. The "Send Flying" technique can be performed by any party member who attacks a Shadow inflicted with an ailment such as Poison or Confusion, enabling that condition to be spread to all other enemies in the encounter; During battle, filling a dedicated gauge through use of attacks and Persona Skills unlocks the ability to enter "Prime Time," a period where characters are able to use all their abilities at no cost to either their Health Points or Skill Points, or alternatively, the player can spend their entire gauge to invoke the "Series Finale," a cinematic area-of-effect attack that deals significant damage similarly to the series' traditional "All-Out Attack" finisher.

== Development ==
In July 2022, Atlus conducted a consumer-led survey in Japan gauging interest in potential remakes and re-releases of past games from the publisher. During a livestreamed broadcast of the poll results, Atlus revealed that Persona 4 (2008) was the fourth most-requested title to be remade among 74.8% of participants. One of the top-voted games, Persona 3 (2006), received a high-definition remake for modern platforms titled Persona 3 Reload in 2024. Reload became the fastest selling title in the Persona series upon crossing one million units sold in a week, as well as the publisher's fastest-selling title as a whole until Metaphor: ReFantazio later that year. The success of Reload created internal interest in immediately pursuing a similar project for Persona 4, which P-Studio producer Kazuhisa Wada considered a game that held a "personal place" in his heart for turning Persona into a successful, well-regarded franchise upon its original release. Wada believed that the positive response to Persona 4's prior releases when paired with Reload's success, presented the opportunity to bring the game to newer audiences by leveraging the accessibility in features and gameplay of the modern Persona entries, while also being careful to preserve the elements of the game returning players praised.

Persona 4 Revival remakes existing character models, environment design, and other assets to be more aesthetically consistent with subsequent games in the series, such as Persona 5 (2016) and the preceding remake Persona 3 Reload (2024). All in-game and animated cutscenes, the latter both from the original PlayStation 2 release and Golden, were overhauled, with in-game cutscenes in particular utilizing new camera angles and techniques. MAPPA produced Revival's animated cutscenes after previously collaborating with Atlus on Persona 5 Royal's opening sequence. As with Reload, the original Japanese cast from prior iterations of Persona 4 will reprise their respective roles, while the English dub will feature an almost entirely new voice cast, including the protagonist (Nazeeh Tarsha), Yosuke Hanamura (Paul Castro Jr.), Chie Satonaka (Anne Yatco), Yukiko Amagi (Brianna Knickerbocker), Rise Kujikawa (Abby Trott), Kanji Tatsumi (Daman Mills), Teddie (Laila Berzins), Naoto Shirogane (Amber Lee Connors), Marie (Ari Thrash), Ryotaro Dojima (Ray Chase), Nanako Dojima (Courtney Shaw), and Aika Nakamura (Judy Alice Lee). Conversely, Tohru Adachi (Johnny Yong Bosch) retains his voice actor from the original PlayStation 2 release, while Margaret (Marisha Ray) and Igor (Kirk Thornton) retain their voice actors from more recent entries in the series. According to Wada, the decade plus gap since Persona 4 was released meant that scheduling time for actors like Laura Bailey and Troy Baker would be hard to do as they are cast in big games, being the original voice actors.

In-house Atlus Sound Team member Ryota Kozuka reprises his duties as Revival's main composer after first scoring the Episode Aigis: The Answer downloadable content (DLC) expansion for Persona 3 Reload, creating several tracks for the game such as a new intro theme and primary battle track, while also overseeing arrangements to the original score composed by Shoji Meguro. Shiori Sasaki serves as Revival's lead vocalist, replacing Shihoko Hirata from prior Persona media. Wada remarked on the importance of music to Persona 4's presentation, stating that a focus of the game's development was on the refinement of existing tracks and extending them to full-length while maintaining their core appeal, while also producing new compositions that better matched the reworked gameplay pacing.

== Release ==
The web domain "p4re.jp" was registered by Atlus in March 2025, prompting online speculation of its connection to a potential Persona 4 remake, with the abbreviation matching the naming convention used for the official Japanese website for Persona 3 Reload. The game's existence was alluded to by numerous actors associated with the franchise, including Yuri Lowenthal, Erin Fitzgerald and Amanda Winn-Lee, throughout late May and early June 2025; the actors announced that they were not asked to reprise their respective roles as Persona 4 characters Yosuke Hanamura, Chie Satonaka and Yukiko Amagi in the remake, which by that point was still unacknowledged by Atlus. Persona 4 Revival was subsequently announced with a teaser trailer during Microsoft Gaming's Xbox Games Showcase event on June 9, 2025. The announcement was accompanied by a message from P-Studio producer Kazuhisa Wada. In an investor relations presentation, Sega Sammy Holdings listed Persona 4 Revival as slated to launch "in or after" its fiscal year 2027 period, which takes place between April 2026 and March 2027. A full trailer announcing the game's release date premiered during the following Xbox Games Showcase on June 8, 2026. Atlus held a livestreamed 22-minute broadcast on June 18 which featured a deep dive into Revival's various gameplay and presentation changes, accompanied by a further message by Wada.

Persona 4 Revival is scheduled to release on February 18, 2027 for PlayStation 5, Windows and Xbox Series X/S. From launch, the game will be playable on Xbox Game Pass Ultimate and PC Game Pass, and will also support Xbox Play Anywhere on Windows and Xbox Series X/S. A Nintendo Switch 2 release was confirmed during the September 2026 Nintendo Direct for a May 20, 2027 release.

== Reception ==
=== Pre-release ===
IGN noted criticism of the game's reveal centered around the lack of game content shown and initial lack of Nintendo Switch 2 as a platform.
