= BlazBlue Alter Memory =

Japanese anime television series

- Anime television series
- Directed by: Hideki Tachibana
- Produced by: Kōji Nagata; Masashi Minetori; Takashi Hanawa; Yukie Iwashita; Jun Fukuda; Masayoshi Matsumoto; Ken Inagaki
- Written by: Deko Akao
- Music by: Arte Refact
- Studio: Hoods Entertainment; Team KG
- Licensed by: Crunchyroll: SEA: Muse Communication
- Original network: Tokyo MX, TV Osaka, TV Aichi
- Original run: October 8, 2013 – December 24, 2013
- Episodes: 12

BlazBlue Alter Memory is a Japanese anime television series based on the video game series BlazBlue, serving as an adaptation of BlazBlue: Calamity Trigger and BlazBlue: Continuum Shift. It aired from October 8 to December 24, 2013. Funimation has licensed the anime for streaming and home video release in North America. Muse Communication licensed the series in Southeast Asia and streamed on Muse Asia YouTube channel.

== Plot ==
In 2199, humanity eagerly waits for the dawn of the new century, after ending a series of devastating magical war. Word spreads that Ragna the Bloodedge, an SS-class rebel with the highest ever bounty and a powerful form of Ars Magus known as the "Azure Grimoire", has appeared in the 13th Hierarchical City of Kagutsuchi. To collect the bounty, a motley array of fighters converge on Kagutsuchi.

== Characters ==
Ragna the Bloodedge (ラグナ = ザ = ブラッドエッジ, Raguna za Buraddoejji)
Voiced by: Tomokazu Sugita, Rina Satō (child) (Japanese); Patrick Seitz, Caitlin Glass (child) (English)

A wanted criminal with an extraordinarily large bounty (well in the trillions) for attempting to destroy the Novus Orbis Librarium. He is Jin and Saya's older brother. His prosthetic arm contains the powerful "Azure Grimoire".

Jin Kisaragi (ジン = キサラギ)
Voiced by: Tetsuya Kakihara (Japanese); David Vincent (English)

A former Major and fourth Thaumaturgist Squadron Commander of the Novus Orbis Librarium, and Ragna and Saya's brother. He wields the Nox Nyctores "Mucro Algesco: Yukianesa" sword.

Noel Vermillion (ノエル = ヴァーミリオン, Noeru Vāmirion)/Mu-12 (ミュー·トゥエルブ, Myū-Tuerubu; μ-12-, μ -No.12-)
Voiced by: Kanako Kondō (Japanese); Cristina Vee (English)

A former lieutenant of the Novus Orbis Librarium assigned to retrieve Jin to the post. In reality, she is a Murakumo Unit known as Mu-12. She wields the Nox Nyctores "Arcus Diabolus: Bolverk" revolvers.

Rachel Alucard (レイチェル = アルカード, Reicheru Arukādo)
Voiced by: Kana Ueda (Japanese); Mela Lee (English)

The head of the Alucard vampire clan and the current owner of the "Tsukuyomi Unit".

Nago (ナゴ)
Voiced by: Masaru Suzuki (Japanese); Ethan Murray (English)

Rachel's black transmogrifying cat speaking and acting snobbishly. He transforms into an umbrella, suitable for a Lobelia (bat lance) cannon or a comfy chair.

Gii (ギイ, Gī)
Voiced by: Saeko Zōgō (Japanese); Cindy Robinson (English)

Rachel's stout red bat familiar. He is often burdened by her orders during teatime, or her fits wherein she has the penchant of either using him as a footrest or pinching his cheek.

Taokaka (タオカカ)
Voiced by: Chiwa Saito (Japanese); Philece Sampler (English)

A female cat of the Kaka clan.

Iron Tager (アイアン = テイガー, Aian Teigā; TR-0009)
Voiced by: Kenji Nomura (Japanese); Jamieson Price (English)

A Sector Seven professor who has been mechanically enhanced to perform field-work.

Litchi Faye-Ling (ライチ = フェイ = リン, Raichi Fei Rin)
Voiced by: Chiaki Takahashi (Japanese); Lauren Landa (English)

A female doctor, whose lover, Roy Carmine Lotte, has been corrupted by seither.

Arakune (アラクネ)
Voiced by: Takashi Hikida (Japanese); Spike Spencer (English)

Also known as Lotte "Roy" Carmine, a monstrous goo with a face mask and Litchi's former lover and scientist.

Bang Shishigami (シシガミ = バング / 獅子神 萬駆, Shishigami Bangu)
Voiced by: Tsuyoshi Koyama (Japanese); Steve Kramer (English)

The leading ninja of the Ikaruga Federation.

Carl Clover (カルル = クローバー, Karuru Kurōbā)
Voiced by: Miyuki Sawashiro (Japanese); Michelle Ruff (English)

The son of Relius and Ignis, whose sister, Ada, resisted death and her soul is inside the puppet Nirvana.

Hakumen (ハクメン; Alternatively spelled Haku-men)
Voiced by: Tetsuya Kakihara (Japanese); David Vincent (English)

One of the Six Heroes who defeated the Black Beast. In truth, Hakumen is Jin's future self, whose soul was bound to the Susano'o unit, after falling into the Gates of Sheol and saved by Rachel.

Nu-13 (ニュー·サーティーン, Nyū-Sātīn; ν-13-, ν -No.13-)
Voiced by: Kanako Kondō (Japanese); Cristina Vee (English)
Tsubaki Yayoi (ツバキ = ヤヨイ)
Voiced by: Asami Imai (Japanese); Julie Ann Taylor (English)

The childhood friend of Jin, Noel, Carl, and Makoto. She is the former roommate of the Military Academy and a major of the non-official Novus Orbis Librarium's Zero Squadron.

Lambda-11 (ラムダ·イレブン, Ramuda-Irebun; λ-11-, λ -No.11-)
Voiced by: Kanako Kondō (Japanese); Cristina Vee (English)
Yūki "Hazama" Terumi (ユウキ = テルミ)/ Hazama (ハザマ)
Voiced by: Yūichi Nakamura (Japanese); Doug Erholtz (English)

The captain of Novus Orbis Librarium's Intelligence Department. In reality, his real name is Yuki Terumi, a former member of the Six Heroes who betrayed them, and the one who abducted Saya and corrupted Jin.

Makoto Nanaya (マコト = ナナヤ)
Voiced by: Tomomi Isomura (Japanese); Cindy Robinson (English)

A former classmate of Tsubaki Yayoi, Carl Clover, Noel Vermillion, and Jin Kisaragi from the Military Academy. She is a squirrel beastkin.

Valkenhayn R. Hellsing (ヴァルケンハイン = R = ヘルシング, Varukenhain Āru Herushingu)
Voiced by: Motomu Kiyokawa (Japanese); Doug Stone (English)

Rachel's servant and one of the Six Heroes with a wolf beastkin.

Platinum the Trinity (プラチナ = ザ = トリニティ, Purachina za Toriniti)
Voiced by: Aoi Yūki (Japanese); Alexis Tipton (English)

A magical girl with multiple personalities.

Relius Clover (レリウス = クローバー, Reriusu Kurōbā)
Voiced by: Junichi Suwabe (Japanese); Travis Willingham (English)

The father of Carl and Ada, and the husband of Ignis.

Kokonoe (ココノエ)
Voiced by: Chie Matsūra (Japanese); Julie Ann Taylor (English)

A scientist of Sector Seven, and the daughter of Jubei and Nine.

Jubei (獣兵衛, Jūbē)
Voiced by: Masaki Terasoma (Japanese); Kirk Thornton (English)

Also known as Mitsuyoshi, he is one of the Six Heroes and Ragna's master who battled the Black Beast alongside Hakumen. He is a cat beastkin.

Linhua (リンファ, Rinfa)
Voiced by: Yukiko Kato (Japanese); Michelle Ruff (English)

Litchi's clinic assistant.

Saya (サヤ)
Voiced by: Yukana (Japanese); Kate Davis (English)

The younger sister of Jin and Ragna. She was born with a frail body, and throughout her life, she was bullied by her brother Jin. Her other brother, Ragna, was much more caring, spent much time with her. Jin grew jealous of the relationship Ragna and Saya shared, and eventually attempted to kill her, immediately after she gave Jin the Nox Nyctores, Yukianesa. She is somehow possessed by an entity known as Izanami and was kidnapped by Yūki Terumi that day, and being given unconscious to Relius Clover under Izanami's order.

Trinity Glassfield (トリニティ = グラスフィール, Toriniti Gurasufīru)
Voiced by: Aoi Yūki (Japanese); Alexis Tipton (English)
Imperator Hades "Librarius" Izanami (帝)
Voiced by: Yukana (Japanese); Kate Davis (English)

The imperator of the NOL. She had Hazama and Relius kidnap Saya and made her a vessel.

== Episode list ==
No.	Title	Original release date
1	"Crimson Rebel" "Akaki Hangyakusha" (Japanese: 赤き反逆者)	October 8, 2013
2	"Successor of the Azure" "Ao no Keishōsha" (Japanese: 蒼の継承者)	October 15, 2013
3	"The Observing Eye" "Bōkan no Me" (Japanese: 傍観の眼)	October 22, 2013
4	"Probabilistic Events" "Kakuritsu Jishō" (Japanese: 確率事象)	October 29, 2013
5	"The Pair of White Guns" "Shiroki Sōjū" (Japanese: 白き双銃)	November 5, 2013
6	"False World" "Itsuwari no Sekai" (Japanese: 偽りの世界)	November 12, 2013
7	"The Wings of Judgment" "Shinpan no Hane" (Japanese: 審判の羽根)	November 19, 2013
8	"The Mechanical Soul" "Kikaishikake no Tamashī" (Japanese: 機械仕掛けの魂)	November 26, 2013
9	"The Power of Order" "Chitsujo no Chikara" (Japanese: 秩序の力)	December 3, 2013
10	"Cocoon of the Godslayer" "Kamigoroshi no Mayu" (Japanese: 神殺しの繭)	December 10, 2013
11	"Murakumo Awakens" "Murakumo Kakusei" (Japanese: 叢雲覚醒)	December 17, 2013
12	"Expense for the Future" "Mirai e no Daishō" (Japanese: 未来への代償)	December 24, 2013
