= Hiiro no Kakera =

Japanese visual novel

- Hiiro no Kakera original visual novel cover

緋色の欠片
- Video game
- Developer: Idea Factory
- Publisher: Idea Factory
- Genre: Otome game, Visual novel
- Platform: PS2, NDS, PSP
- Released: JP: July 6, 2006
- Anime television series

Hiiro no Kakera: The Tamayori Princess Saga
- Directed by: Bob Shirohata
- Produced by: Yoshihito Yonekura; Hiroaki Tsunoda; Chinatsu Matsui; Shigeru Saitō; Nobumitsu Urasaki; Kōsaku Sakamoto; Kozue Kaneniwa
- Written by: Yoshiko Nakamura
- Music by: Hikaru Nanase
- Studio: Studio Deen
- Licensed by: AUS: Hanabee; NA: Sentai Filmworks
- Original run: April 1, 2012 – June 24, 2012
- Episodes: 13
- Anime television series

Hiiro no Kakera: The Tamayori Princess Saga 2
- Directed by: Bob Shirohata
- Produced by: Yoshihito Yonekura; Hiroaki Tsunoda; Chinatsu Matsui; Shigeru Saitō; Nobumitsu Urasaki; Kōsaku Sakamoto; Kozue Kaneniwa
- Written by: Yoshiko Nakamura
- Music by: Hikaru Nanase
- Studio: Studio Deen
- Licensed by: AUS: Hanabee; NA: Sentai Filmworks
- Original run: October 1, 2012 – December 23, 2012
- Episodes: 13
- Original video animation

Hiiro no Kakera Taizen: Totsugeki! Tonari no Ikemens
- Studio: Studio Deen
- Released: March 28, 2013
- Runtime: 15 minutes

Hiiro no Kakera (緋色の欠片; lit. 'Scarlet Fragments') is a Japanese visual novel created by Idea Factory directed at the female market, known as an otome game. Released on July 6, 2006, for the PlayStation 2, the protagonist is a teenage girl who revisits a small village she remembers from her childhood and gets caught up in her family's history and supernatural dangers surrounding it.

A thirteen episode anime adaptation by Studio Deen aired in Japan between April 1, 2012, and June 24, 2012, and was licensed in North America by Sentai Filmworks. A second season, Hiiro no Kakera: Dai Ni Shō (緋色の欠片 第二章; lit. 'Scarlet Fragments: Second Chapter'), aired between October 1, 2012, and December 23, 2012. Some characters from this property are featured in the PSP game B's LOG Party, released on May 20, 2010.

== Plot ==
Tamaki Kasuga is a teenage girl who revisits a small village she remembers from her childhood and gets caught up in her family's history and the supernatural dangers surrounding it. While walking along the hillsides waiting for the person who her grandmother sent to fetch Tamaki to the village, Tamaki comes across a small, white round object which has sticks for limbs and can talk. It runs off soon after with Tamaki chasing after it. Soon Tamaki finds herself in a place where it does not feel like the world she came from. She gets attacked by three slime creatures, and a mysterious man comes charging in to save her tells her to be quiet. After the young man, recognized as Takuma Onizaki, saves her, he walks her to the village where her grandmother is staying. Soon after her arrival she meets with her grandmother. It is later explained that she has to continue the role of the ancestor Tamayori Princess to seal the sword Onikirimaru with the help of her five Guardians.

== Characters ==
=== Main characters ===
Tamaki Kasuga (春日 珠紀, Kasuga Tamaki)
Voiced by: Marie Miyake (Japanese); Emily Neves (English)
The main protagonist of the series, though her name is changeable in the PS2 and DS version. Tamaki is the next Tamayori Princess after her grandmother, Shizuki. She is very connected with, and can sense through, her body whenever something happens to the Onikirimaru seals. When she first comes to the village, she has no idea what was going on. But as the story progresses, she gets used to all the unusual things happening around her. She is known to have strong faith even when the situation appears hopeless. Near the end of the series, she finally awakens completely as the new Tamayori Princess, and is able to put a stop to the sacrificing and the Onikirimaru. The new power associated with the Tamayori Princess grants her several abilities such as self-defense and barrier formation. She is saved by Takuma as soon as she arrives, but starts hating him because of his attitude toward her. They then end up being in the same class as each other. When she meets all five Guardians, she is not accepted much because she was "useless", and they grew up as tools who live only to protect her. But later in the story she is accepted by the five Guardians after showing she truly cares for them. She later falls in love with Takuma, and discovers they were lovers in their past life, in which he promised to become one of her Guardians in their current life, which he did. She is also the only one who can stop Takuma's power from taking over his body. She states her hobby is visiting shrines and temples.
Takuma Onizaki (鬼崎 拓磨, Onizaki Takuma)
Voiced by: Tomokazu Sugita (Japanese); Andrew Love (English)
The main hero of the series and the first of the Guardians to meet Tamaki. Takuma does not accept her at first, and shows a cold attitude towards her. He later finds out they are to be classmates. Although he is annoyed with Tamaki at first, he grows to accept her, and even falls in love with her. He has powerful strength, and finds out he is the descendant of the oni, whose power is very hard to control, especially when near the sealed magical sword Onikirimaru. At times, the power inside of him starts to take over, but he becomes himself again when Tamaki is with him. His hobby is doing crosswords and he likes eating taiyaki. It is revealed that he is actually the reincarnation of the Underworld God, and was Tamaki's lover in their past life.
Mahiro Atori (鴉取 真弘, Atori Mahiro)
Voiced by: Kousuke Okano (Japanese); Greg Ayres (English)
An upperclassman of Tamaki's and one of the five Guardians. Mahiro is the descendant of the raven and can control the wind. He is extremely self-conscious when it comes to his height, because although he is older than most of them, he is the shortest. He is usually very loud, energetic, short-tempered and sometimes immature. He is not afraid to say what he feels, however he can show a serious and deep side when needed. He likes women with big breasts and loves motorbikes, and yakisoba sandwiches. At the beginning, he disliked Tamaki because he thought he was just her tool. There were several instances where he took his anger out on her. Later, however, he sees that she truly cares about his and the others' well-being. He grows fond and protective of her. Throughout the series, there are hints that he may be in love with her, but he accepts Tamaki and Takuma's relationship because he feels that Takuma is the only one meant to be with her.
Yuuichi Komura (狐邑 祐一, Komura Yūichi)
Voiced by: Daisuke Namikawa (Japanese); David Matranga (English)
An upperclassman of Tamaki's and another of the five Guardians. Yuichi is the descendant of the nine-tailed fox and specializes in using illusions and spirit fire. He is very quiet and can be emotionless. He can be found a lot of the times in the library, usually reading a book. He likes spacing out and has the ability to sleep anywhere at any time. His hobby is just relaxing and laying on the grass in the sun.
Suguru Oomi (大蛇 卓, Ōmi Suguru)
Voiced by: Daisuke Hirakawa (Japanese); Illich Guardiola (English)
Unofficial leader of the Guardians and descendant of the giant snake. Suguru is the tactician of the group and can also create powerful seals and barriers and also controls water. He is very polite and reliable but has a childish side, usually seen smiling. He loves drinking tea and teaching calligraphy. He has a strong dislike for Drei, but still keeps himself in line. Because his mother, a Tamayori Princess, was sacrificed, he is strongly against the sacrifice tradition.
Shinji Inukai (犬戒 慎司, Inukai Shinji)
Voiced by: Hiroki Shimowada (Japanese); Corey Hartzog (English)
He is the youngest of the Guardians and is a grade below Tamaki and Takuma. Shinji has the power of restoration and can use the power of words to control things. It is hinted that he and Mitsuru were close before he went away and were possibly in love, although not much about their relationship is revealed. His hobby is his excellent skills in cooking. It is revealed that he was giving information to Logos and later finds out that he is the twin to Mitsuru in the second season. He is formerly named Fünf from Logos when he was a child.
Ryou Kutani (狗谷遼, Kutani Ryō)
Voiced by: Kazunori Nomiya (Japanese); Leraldo Anzaldua (English)
He is in the same year as Tamaki and Takuma, but he is actually one year older than them. He is a lone wolf and does as he pleases. He has a penchant for sniffing Tamaki, which is due to his powers. It is later revealed that he is actually a member of the Inukai household, who would have been the Inukai Guardian, however his mother hid his existence.

=== Logos ===
Aria Rozenburg (アリア・ローゼンブルグ)
Voiced by: Tomomi Isomura (Japanese); Hilary Haag (English)
A young girl with long blonde hair and blue eyes. Aria believes that she is the sacred maiden blessed by God. She can neutralize all magical attacks and bless spirits. Aria speaks in an adult-like manner but sometimes acts like a child, though in denial of acting like one.
Eins (オーナー) / Leif Helluland
Voiced by: Hiroki Yasumoto (Japanese); Chris Hutchison (English)
An aide to Aria and his codename is one in German. Eins has super strength and specializes in close range combat. He is very protective of Aria and is connected to her. He died protecting her from Drei.
Zwei (ツヴァイ) / Hugo Stingrail
Voiced by: Yoshihisa Kawahara (Japanese); Adam Gibbs (English)
An aide to Aria and his codename is two in German. Zwei fights with a scythe and likes to eat his opponents' souls. Mahiro calls him "death-god".
Drei (ドライ) / Magus Melchizedek
Voiced by: Yōji Ueda (Japanese); Rob Mungle (English)
An aide to Aria and his codename is three in German. Drei is a magician and can summon dark spirits to fight. He is not the original Drei. He is very interested in research and regards his opponents as potential research subjects. His loyalty to Logos is unsure and a mystery. He is later revealed to be one of the four Wisemen of Logos.
Vier (フィーア)
Voiced by: Sayaka Ohara (Japanese); Shelley Calene-Black (English)
An aide to Aria and her codename is four in German. Vier was the only one chosen by Aria herself out of all the subordinates. She is a skilled tactician, and an alias for Fiona. She poses as a teacher named Fiona. She reminds Suguru of his mother but is actually a clone of Suguru's mother created by the four Wisemen.
Fünf (フェンフ)
Voiced by: Hiroki Shimowada (Japanese); Corey Hartzog (English)
An aide to Aria and his codename is five in German. Fünf is the alias for Shinji.

=== Others ===
Shizuki Ugaya (宇賀谷 静紀, Ugaya Shizuki)
Voiced by: Tamie Kubota (Japanese); Luci Christian (English)
The grandmother of Tamaki. Shizuki is the previous Tamayori Princess before bestowing that title onto Tamaki. She tasks Tamaki with the responsibility of protecting the Onikirimaru seals.
Mitsuru Kotokura (言蔵 美鶴, Kotokura Mitsuru)
Voiced by: Chihiro Aikawa (Japanese); Rebekah Stevens (English)
A girl that works at the shrine. Mitsuru is very polite, and she can appear emotionless and doll-like. She is also a very good cook and is good at housework. She has the power to create invisible barriers. Tamaki, when caught in her barrier at one point, comments that it feels like mizuame. She seems to have feelings for Shinji, but in the second season it turns out that she is Shinji's twin sister.
O-chan (おーちゃん) / Osaki-ko (大阪-コウ)
Voiced by: Rikako Yamaguchi (Japanese); Luci Christian (English)
A kitsune that Tamaki receives and can be named by the player. O-chan ravels in Tamaki's shadows and comes out at her calling. It likes curling up and sleeping in warm places.
Masataka Ashiya (芦屋 正隆, Ashiya Masataka)
Voiced by: Yoshikazu Nagano (Japanese); David Wald (English)
A mysterious man that Tamaki and the Guardians meet early on at the shrine and Kiyono's boss. Ashiya says he is a businessman. He is interested in reading palms and faces. He loves eating rice crackers.
Kiyono Takara (多家良 清乃, Takara Kiyono)
Voiced by: Suzuko Mimori (Japanese); Brittney Karbowski (English)
A classmate of Tamaki that befriends her. Kiyono makes money from making straw voodoo dolls. In the second season, it is revealed that she works with Ashiya, as he is not her uncle. She is actually 23, despite looking younger.
Fiona Ashiuma (フィオ ナ先生, Ashiuma Fiona)
Voiced by: Sayaka Ohara (Japanese); Shelley Calene-Black (English)
The English teacher at Tamaki's school. Fiona has long blonde hair and looks like she comes from Hollywood, while appearing to be of German origin. Her true form is Vier from Logos.

== Development and release ==
Hiiro no Kakera was developed by Idea Factory and released on July 6, 2006, for the PlayStation 2 (PS2) as the first in the Hiiro no Kakera series. The next two games were released in 2007 and the PS2: Hiiro no Kakera: Ano Sora no Shita de (緋色の欠片 ～あの空の下で～) on February 15 and Hisui no Shizuku: Hiiro no Kakera 2 (翡翠の雫 緋色の欠片2) on August 9. Shin Hisui no Shizuku: Hiiro no Kakera 2 (真・翡翠の雫 緋色の欠片2) followed on October 1, 2009, for the PS2, and was later ported to the PlayStation Portable (PSP) on August 19, 2010, and the Nintendo DS (NDS) on June 16, 2011. Soukoku no Kusabi: Hiiro no Kakera 3 (蒼黒の楔 緋色の欠片3) was released on August 7, 2008, for the PS2, and was later ported to the PSP on April 15, 2010, and the NDS on August 25, 2011.

The original game and Ano Sora no Shita de were later combined and released as Hiiro no Kakera: Omoiiro no Kioku (緋色の欠片 〜おもいいろの記憶〜; lit. 'Scarlet Fragments: Memories of Many Colors') on July 27, 2017, for the PlayStation Vita, and it was later released on the Nintendo Switch on August 1, 2024.

Hiiro no Kakera: Shin Tamayori Hime Denshou (ヒイロノカケラ 新玉依姫伝承) was released for the PS2 on October 1, 2009, and was later ported to the PSP on September 30, 2010. Hiiro no Kakera Aizouban: Akane Iro no Tsuioku (緋色の欠片 愛蔵版 ～あかねいろの追憶～) was the first game in the series released on the PlayStation 3 (PS3) on May 26, 2011. Hiiro no Kakera: Shin Tamayori Hime Denshou – Piece of Future (ヒイロノカケラ 新玉依姫伝承 -Piece of Future-) followed on the PSP on July 14, 2011. Sokoku no Kusabi: Hiiro no Kakera 3 – Ashita e no Tobira (蒼黒の楔 緋色の欠片3 明日への扉) was released for the PSP on May 17, 2012. Shirahana no Ori: Hiiro no Kakera 4 (白華の檻 ～緋色の欠片4～), set in the Heian period unlike the rest of the installments, was released also for the PSP on September 20, 2012. A fandisc for the 4th, titled Hakka no Ori 〜Hiiro no Kakera 4〜 Shiki no Uta (白華の檻 〜緋色の欠片4〜 四季の詩) was released on September 5, 2013, and even received a drama CD adaptation.

== Anime ==
A thirteen episode anime television series adaptation was announced in July 2011 via Enterbrains B's-Log. The series aired between April 1, 2012, and June 24, 2012. The series is directed by Bob Shirohata and produced by Studio Deen. The opening theme is "Nee" (ねぇ; lit. 'Say') by Maiko Fujita, and the ending theme is "Kono Te de Idaki Tomeru kara" (この手で抱きとめるから; lit. 'Because I Can Catch You') by Shuhei Kita. Both themes were released as singles by Lantis in 2012. A second season, Hiiro no Kakera: Dai Ni Shō (緋色の欠片 第二章; lit. 'Scarlet Fragments: Second Chapter'), aired between October 1, 2012, and December 23, 2012. The opening theme is "Takanaru" (高鳴る; lit. 'Throbbing') by Maiko Fujita, and the ending theme is "Kimi Dake wo" (君だけを; lit. 'Only You') by Shuhei Kita. Both seasons were streamed on Crunchyroll.

=== Episode list ===
==== Hiiro no Kakera ====
No.	Title	Original release date
1	"The Tamayori Princess"; Transliteration: "Tamayori no Hime" (Japanese: 玉衣の姫)	April 1, 2012
As fall season rolls around, high school student Tamaki Kasuga is on her way to her grandmother's shrine in a village surrounded by nature. When she is attacked by three drowned gods, she but is saved by a surly boy named Takuma Onizaki by having her recite incantations to ward off the drowned gods, before the two make it to the shrine. Tamaki learns from her grandmother, Shizuki Ugaya, she is destined to be the next Tamayori Princess, due to her ability to see supernatural beings, and it is her fate to reseal a sword called the Onikirimaru. Throughout her day, after she realizes Takuma is a student at her school, she meets an eccentric Mahiro Atori on the school roof, encounters a nonchalant Yuuichi Komura in the library, and greets a kind Suguru Oomi back at the shrine, where is explained the four of them are the Guardians, who are bound to protect the Tamayori Princess.
2	"Determined First Step"; Transliteration: "Ketsui no Ippo" (Japanese: 決意の一歩)	April 8, 2012
Fiona Ashiuma is Tamaki's English teacher, who welcomes her to the class. After school the next day, Takuma, Mahiro and Yuuichi struggle to find a name for Tamaki's pet kitsune, but Tamaki ends up naming it O-chan. Tamaki learns from her classmate Kiyono Takara there have been recent disappearances in the area. After Tamaki deduces the Onikirimaru seal has weakened, Suguru explains the Onikirimaru seal is protected by the blood of the Tamayori and the five Artifacts kept in seal grounds. Tamaki and the four Guardians go to a sealed storehouse, which stores books containing the history of the Tamayori Princess. The fact Tamaki could unlock the warehouse and can hear a voice from touching a book proves she is the next Tamayori Princess. The next day after school, it was informed the barrier of one of the seal grounds has been tampered with. While searching at the first seal ground, Tamaki is attacked by more drowned gods, prompting the Guardians to protect her from danger.
3	"The Five Guardians"; Transliteration: "Go-ri no Gādian" (Japanese: 五人の守護者)	April 15, 2012
At a school stairway, Tamaki trips off a step, but she is caught by Shinji Inukai, who is the fifth Guardian. At the school roof, Tamaki reunites Shinji with Takuma, Mahiro and Yuuichi, though the three give Tamaki a hard time. After the three tell Shinji Mitsuru Kotokura, a maid who works at the shrine, was depressed after Shinji previously left the village, Shinji reveals he left the village in order to manifest his powers through training. Back at the shrine, Suguru accompanies Tamaki and Shinji to see Shizuki, who welcomes Shinji back to the village and tests to see if his powers are awakened. The following day at the school roof, Takuma, Mahiro, Yuuichi and Shinji draw straws to determine who would be the first to escort Tamaki home while the others patrol the seal. As Takuma is the one chosen to do so, Tamaki has been having recurring headaches, which sense a presence breaking through the barrier at the first seal ground. There, the five Guardians encounter a group known as the Logos, who are after the Artifacts. When Tamaki arrives to stop both groups, the Logos retreat. The five Guardians thank Tamaki for her help.
4	"The Holy Woman's Advent"; Transliteration: "Seijo no Kōrin" (Japanese: 聖女の降臨)	April 22, 2012
On the school roof, Yuuichi points out to Tamaki, Takuma, Mahiro and Shinji which the members of Logos are codenamed Eins, Zwei, Drei and Vier, which are translates in German for one, two, three and four. Tamaki then says her headaches recur when someone is trying to break through a seal barrier. After school on the way to the village, Tamaki learns about the hobbies of the five Guardians. Suguru explains the five Artifacts, which originally belonged to the Tamayori Princess, consist of the Necklace, the Bracelet, the Bells, the Mirror and the Ring. These five Artifacts make the barrier and seal the Onikirimaru, which no one can break except the Tamayori Princess and the Guardians. When Tamaki senses a presence at the first seal ground, Tamaki and the Guardians head over there, only to find a little girl named Aria Rozenburg, leader of the Logos. After a fierce battle, the Logos easily defeat the Guardians and leave them defenseless, while Aria extracts the Bracelet from the seal ground, which causes great pain in Tamaki's heart. Aria and the Logos then take their leave.
5	"The Two Tasks"; Transliteration: "Futatsu no Shimei" (Japanese: 相克(ふたつ)の使命)	April 29, 2012
As Tamaki and the Guardians return to see Shizuki after failing to defend the Bracelet, Shizuki urges Tamaki to release the Tamayori Princess within her. After they all enjoy a feast cooked by Mitsuru, Tamaki notices Mitsuru is still in love with Shinji while passing by in the kitchen. The next day after school, it appears Takuma, Mahiro, Yuuichi and Shinji are all tired from patrolling the seals. Back at the shrine, she runs outside the shrine after having a headache and bumps into Ryou Kutani, who questions her affiliation with Shizuki as being her grandmother. After running towards the second seal ground, she encounters Aria, who declares the Logos plan to release the Onikirimaru to prevent it from being resealed. When Takuma and Mahiro come, Tamaki tells them to stand down, vowing to Aria she will not give up on preventing the Logos from succeeding in their plan. Aria leaves after saying she will bring the Logos back at the second seal ground on the following night. Takuma and Mahiro express their gratitude to Tamaki for how she handled the situation.
6	"The Course of the Battle"; Transliteration: "Taiketsu no Yukue" (Japanese: 対決の行方)	May 6, 2012
Before Tamaki leaves for school, she meets Masataka Ashiya, who is a judicial officer leading the temple investigation and is Kiyono's uncle. Takuma, Mahiro, Yuuichi and Shinji tell Tamaki to relax and let them do their job as her Guardians. Tamaki and the Guardians prepare for the battle at the second seal ground with high hopes of winning. When they reach the second seal ground at night, Aria sends the Logos after the Guardians to fight. After the Guardians do not fare well against the Logos, Tamaki recites incantations to assist the Guardians in defeating the Logos. However, the Logos survive the incantations and easily subdue the Guardians. Tamaki gives in and allows Aria to extract the Mirror from the seal ground. Tamaki and Aria exchange the promise they both will not hold back when they meet again for their next battle.
7	"The Breaking of Bonds"; Transliteration: "Kizuna no Hokorobi" (Japanese: 絆の綻び)	May 13, 2012
Tamaki recalls the battle at the second seal ground at school. She crosses paths with Ryou at school, angry at her first uncomfortable encounter with him. Ryou leaves when Kiyona arrives, and Kiyona tells Tamaki Ryou is a delinquent who was suspended from school in the past. On the school roof, Tamaki finds her Guardians, but Takuma and Mahiro are mad at her for letting Aria take the Mirror after the Logos defeated them, which sends her into depression. After school, Yuuichi tells her the Guardians are tools and not humans, which is something Tamaki disagrees with. The next day on the school roof, she suggests Takuma and Mahiro stop patrolling the seals since they see themselves as expendables. Shinji volunteers himself to find out where the Logos are hiding, while Yuuichi chooses to check the library for archives containing information about every organization. Meanwhile, Vier gives Aria evidence Drei is actually a replacement for the original one who died before, thereby questioning his loyalties to Logos. Aria orders Vier to put Drei under house arrest for the time being. Ashiya arrives at the shrine to speak with Shizuki, though Suguru senses an ulterior motive.
8	"The Prediction of the Bureau of Medicine"; Transliteration: "Ten'yaku Ryō no Omowaku" (Japanese: 典薬寮の思惑)	May 20, 2012
In the shrine, Ashiya reveals he is a representative of the Bureau of Medicine, the branch of government overseeing the imperial court, sent to convince Tamaki and the Guardians to cooperate with him to ensure the preservation of the seal. After Ashiya mentions he can find out why the Logos are not making a move at this point, Tamaki accepts Ashiya's assistance, much to the disapproval of the Guardians. The next day outside, Tamaki is suspicious when she sees Shinji talking to Fiona, but Tamaki is further shocked upon seeing Ryou spying on Shinji as well. After school in the storehouse, Tamaki hears a voice while looking through the books. She is then suddenly possessed by the voice, who tells Takuma and Mahiro the legend behind the Tamayori Princess of when she sealed the Onikirimaru after it was released and nearly caused the end of the world. Mahiro reveals the Logos can easily pass through the barrier because it has weakened, since Shizuki, as the Tamayori Princess foretold in the legend, is slowly dying due to her old age. Tamaki fails to talk Mahiro into not giving up on defeating the enemy. Before leaving with Takuma, Mahiro tells Tamaki he already knows he is not strong enough to fight.
9	"The Rumbling of the Earth"; Transliteration: "Daichi no Meidō" (Japanese: 大地の鳴動)	May 27, 2012
At the third seal ground, Takuma and Mahiro confront an angry mountain god, who leaves with a warning after the two tell him to be patient. Meanwhile in the storehouse, Tamaki encounters Mitsuru, who is worried about her. After school in a classroom, Tamaki is contacted by Drei while under house arrest. Yuuichi, Shinji and Suguru all protect Tamaki when Drei attacks her. Drei vanishes when Fiona arrives, and Fiona reveals herself as Vier before leaving. Tamaki returns to the storehouse and finds a book about the ceremonial offering records, which causes her to realize the Guardians will unlock their true powers when she awakens as the Tamayori Princess. After briefly running into Ashiya, Tamaki tells Takuma and Mahiro about what she found out about the book she read, though Takuma and Mahiro tell her not to stress out about it. On the way to the third seal ground, Tamaki and the Guardians find Eins and Zwei attacking the mountain god before extracting the Necklace from the third seal ground and taking their leave.
10	"The Guardian's Feelings"; Transliteration: "Shugo no Omoi" (Japanese: 守護の想い)	June 3, 2012
Aria scolds Eins, Zwei and Drei for their disobedience. Tamaki meets with the Guardians on the school roof, where Suguru suggests the Guardians should live with Tamaki to further protect her in response to the recent events. Although Tamaki believes this to be a crazy idea, she eventually accepts the decision and allows them to stay with her. It is shown Ashiya and Ryou are working together to keep a close eye on Shinji. While Tamaki discusses with Mahiro about his familiarity with the Logos thanks to Shizuki, she learns he plans to travel to America. At night, Takuma tells Tamaki not to worry and not to run away. He relaxes her when he states the Guardians are protecting her by choice and not just by fate. Later, when Takuma, Mahiro, Yuuichi and Shinji finish taking their baths, Tamaki becomes embarrassed when she sees them in their towels.
11	"The Demon's Tradition"; Transliteration: "Oni no Denshō" (Japanese: 鬼の伝承)	June 10, 2012
Tamaki has been having a recurring yet unclear dream, seeing an altered reflection of herself in a lake in the middle of a forest. At school, Kiyono gets the wrong idea about Tamaki now living with five guys at her house. During lunch on the school roof, Yuuichi informs Tamaki, Takuma, Mahiro and Shinji that Suguru is investigating the Bureau of Medicine. When Tamaki, Takuma, Mahiro, Yuuichi and Shinji return to the shrine, they find out Suguru invited Ashiya over for a visit. Tamaki wishes she would awaken her powers as soon as possible, since Ashiya predicts the Guardians will be killed if the two remaining Artifacts are taken away. Takuma and Mahiro encourage Tamaki to come to the storehouse to continue their research on the history of the Tamayori Princess. Tamaki comes across a book, which explains the Tamayori Princess sealed the power of an oni, which was defeated in a battle lasting seven days and nights against three other gods, into the Onikirimaru. As Takuma recognizes his bloodline with of the oni, he feels as if he has a dormant monster inside of him. Tamaki comforts him by assuring she will drive this monster out of his body when she finally awakens her powers.
12	"A Time for Battle"; Transliteration: "Kessen no Koku (Toki)" (Japanese: 決戦の刻)	June 17, 2012
At the school roof, even though Yuuichi comes up with a plan to patrol the last two Artifacts, Shinji wants to continue searching for the location of the Logos. After school, Ryou ask Tamaki if she has ever been betrayed, hinting it as a warning, but Takuma arrives and takes her away with him. On the way home, Takuma and Mahiro tell Tamaki not to worry so much about Ryou. When Tamaki suddenly gets a headache, she guides Takuma and Mahiro to Eins and Zwei at the fifth seal ground, while Yuuichi, Suguru and Shinji encounter Aria, Drei and Vier at the fourth seal ground. After a long battle, the Guardians lose against the Logos, allowing Aria to extract the Bells from the fourth seal ground and the Ring from the fifth seal ground, causing great pain for Tamaki and shrouding the whole forest in darkness.
13	"The Power of the Onikirimaru"; Transliteration: "Onikimaru no Chikara" (Japanese: 鬼斬丸の力)	June 24, 2012
Aria sends Eins to retrieve the other Artifacts, prompting Takuma to give chase. The other Guardians, who are eager to fight the rest of the Logos with what little strength they have left, advise Tamaki to go after Takuma deep into the forest. When Tamaki catches up to Takuma, she is shocked to find him slowly transforming into an oni during a fierce match against Eins. After Shizuki and Mitsuru come to encourage her to stop Takuma, Tamaki embraces him and finally awakens as the Tamayori Princess to calm him down. After attempting to stop Eins from hurting Takuma, Tamaki summons the Onikirimaru from within the lake, breaking the barrier which covers the area in a dark breeze. Takuma retrieves and unleashes the Onikirimaru, which nearly transforms him into an oni, which is until Tamaki commands him to calm his powers in order for him to wield this sword. After seeing this, Aria tells the Logos to retreat for now. Although Takuma suddenly faints from wielding the Onikirimaru, Tamaki and the Guardians are relieved when he wakes up and thanks them for saving him.

==== Hiiro no Kakera: Dai Ni Shō ====
No.	Title	Original release date
1	"The Tamayori's Fate"; Transliteration: "Tamayori no Sadame" (Japanese: 玉依の運命（さだめ）)	October 1, 2012
Tamaki Kasuga, who is enjoying the time of peace after the Onikirimaru incident, is surprised to see her Guardians still escorting her to school. She reminisces her memories with each of her Guardians (Takuma Onizaki, Mahiro Atori, Yuuichi Komura, Suguru Oomi and Shinji Inukai). She also recalls her battles against Aria Rozenburg and the Logos (Eins, Zwei, Drei and Vier). When Tamaki returns home to prepare for dinner, Suguru tells her and the other Guardians that Masataka Ashiya found the hideout of the Logos at the edge of the forest protected by a strong barrier. Since the Onikirimaru has not been sealed completely, Shizuki Ugaya tells Mitsuru Kotokura to prepare a ceremonial offering, something Suguru overheard from eavesdropping.
2	"Ominous Dark Clouds"; Transliteration: "Anun no Yochō" (Japanese: 暗雲の予兆)	October 7, 2012
The next day, Suguru talks to Shizuki to stop Mitsuru from performing a ceremonial offering, but to no success. Suguru remembers that his mother was used as a ceremonial offering in the past. As Suguru later greets Tamaki, Takuma, Mahiro and Yuuichi back home, they realized that Shinji has run off somewhere in the forest. Shinji recalls his past when he was abandoned by his parents at his village and was taken in as a member of Logos codenamed Fünf, which is German for five. Suguru eventually find Shinji, aware that he betrayed the Guardians. Suguru decides to join the Logos in their cause, prompting Shinji to go back to the shrine to inform Tamaki, Takuma, Mahiro and Yuuichi about this. They all go back into the forest to find Suguru, only for him to tell them to go back home. As the five return to the shrine, they all decide to trust Suguru's judgment for joining the Logos.
3	"The Traitor's Vow"; Transliteration: "Uragiri no Chigiri" (Japanese: 裏切りの契)	October 14, 2012
Ashiya tells Tamaki that Suguru's defection to the Logos was predicted by the Bureau of Medicine, but Takuma tells Ashiya to leave, still not trusting what he says. Shinji goes into the forest and pleads to Vier to take him to see Aria at the hideout. After dinner, Tamaki chances upon Ryou, who reveals that Shinji is associated with Logos, after witnessing Shinji with Vier in the forest. Yuuichi later takes Tamaki to the hideout, explaining that Shinji was the one who told the Logos where the Artifacts were previously located. When Tamaki and Yuuichi sneak into main room of the hideout, they overhear Shinji telling Aria to leave the hideout, but Aria rejects the request. Aria, already sensing Tamaki and Yuuichi in the room, tells Vier to unveil them from hiding. Aria says that the Onikirimaru is merely resting, as she is waiting for it to awaken to show its full power. Suguru and Zwei arrive and attack Tamaki, Yuuichi and Shinji, but Yuuichi manages to take Tamaki and Shinji outside to safety. At the shrine, Takuma and Mahiro are shocked to hear from Ashiya about Shinji's betrayal, which then maddens Mahiro.
4	"The Destruction of the Five Guardian Families"; Transliteration: "Go Ie no Hōkai" (Japanese: 五家の崩壊)	October 21, 2012
After Mahiro confronts Shinji for his betrayal, Shinji runs off in tears. Tamaki, Takuma, Mahiro and Yuuichi believe that the Onikirimaru seems to be doing okay in the shrine. However, as Tamaki, Takuma, Mahiro and Yuuichi head into the forest, they encounter the mountain god, who reveals that the Onikirimaru is indeed beginning to awaken once again. The mountain god leaves after saying that Takuma contains the power of the Onikirimaru inside of him, hence the reason why this sword has not been sealed completely. The following day at the school roof, Tamaki worries when Takuma did not come to school, but he later arrives, much to her relief. On the way back home, Takuma almost loses control of his powers, but Tamaki manages to suppress them. Mitsuru finds Shinji and brings him some food, which gives him some nostalgia. Meanwhile, an impatient Drei asks Suguru to lead him and Zwei to the Onikirimaru, but the three of them encounter Mahiro and Yuuichi on their way.
5	"The Truth of Tears"; Transliteration: "Sōsei no Shinjitsu" (Japanese: 涙の真実)	October 28, 2012
Before letting them go after a brief fight, Suguru gives Mahiro and Yuuichi the ultimatum of either the Logos taking the Onikirimaru by force or the Guardians surrendering the Onikirimaru. Meanwhile, Shizuki suspends Takuma from the village and places Tamaki under house arrest under Mitsuru's surveillance, given the situation with Takuma's current condition. Drei requests Suguru to protect Aria, since Drei is taking Eins and Zwei to the main branch of the Logos to see the four Wisemen. When Mahiro and Yuuichi return to the shrine, Shizuki assures the two that the Onikirimaru is safe in the shrine. At night, Shinji confesses to Shizuki about his former connection to the Logos, but Shizuki reveals to Shinji that Mitsuru is actually his long-lost twin sister, which later changes the way he feels for Mitsuru. After Shinji leaves, Tamaki converses with Mitsuru, empathizing for how she is feeling right now.
6	"The Deceitful Heart"; Transliteration: "Itsuwari no Kokoro" (Japanese: 偽りの心)	November 4, 2012
Over a cup of tea, Aria wonders if the Onikirimaru can resurrect the deceased, but Suguru believes that this would be an unforgivable act if it were even possible. Mitsuru, being told by Shizuki to prepare another ceremonial offering, remembers how saddening it was to see Suguru's mother sacrifice herself in the pond, all to make the barrier stronger again. After seeing a speechless Mitsuru heading away from the shrine, Shinji runs inside the shrine in an attempt to take the Onikirimaru. As the barrier is proven to be strong, Mahiro and Yuuichi restrain him, both telling him to stop worrying about the past and try concentrating on the future. Takuma returns to the village in hopes of coming to terms with Tamaki with their situation, but Shizuki catches him on the premises and tells him that he is scaring Tamaki. For her safety, Tamaki advises Takuma to leave, and Shizuki relieves Takuma of his duties as a Guardian. However, Tamaki actually wishes for Takuma to stay by her side instead.
7	"Memory of a Dream"; Transliteration: "Yume no Kioku" (Japanese: 夢の記憶)	November 11, 2012
Tamaki breaks out of her room to retrieve the Onikirimaru, but Mitsuru catches her and sends her to Shizuki in the storehouse. As Tamaki asks Shizuki about the ceremonial offering, Shizuki responds that the Onikirimaru is protected by human sacrifices, much to Tamaki's surprise. Ashiya arrives to reveal that Tamaki as the Tamayori Princess will inevitably die to completely seal the Onikirimaru. Tamaki is confined in the storehouse after Shizuki, Mitsuru and Ashiya leaves. When Kiyono Takara arrives at the shrine, Ryou tells her that Tamaki is confined in the storehouse. Mahiro, Yuuichi and Shinji are suspicious of Ryou and Kiyono because of this. Mahiro confronts Shizuki and offers himself as a sacrifice in place of Tamaki, but Shizuki tells him to disregard the matter. Meanwhile, Vier reveals to Suguru that she is a homunculus who was formed to look like his mother. Eins, Zwei and Drei return from their visit to the main branch of the Logos. Tamaki has a vision of a Guardian vowing to protect the Tamayori Princess. Elsewhere, O-chan finds Takuma to bring him to the storehouse, so that Takuma can confess to Tamaki that he is himself when he is with her.
8	"Their Resolution"; Transliteration: "Futari no Kesshin" (Japanese: 二人の決心)	November 18, 2012
Takuma breaks into the storehouse to free Tamaki. Meanwhile, Mahiro explains to Yuuichi and Shinji that he should be used as a sacrifice due to his bloodline of the Raven during the battle against the oni foretold in the legend. When Tamaki and Takuma make a run from the shrine, they are halted by Shizuki and Ashiya. Takuma manages to retrieve the Onikirimaru and escape with Tamaki from the shrine into the forest. Although Ashiya fails to stop them, the two encounter a hoard of drowned gods, trapped within a barrier. Shizuki orders Mahiro, Yuuichi and Shinji to bring Tamaki and Takuma back to the shrine. Eins, recalling his past of when his wife was killed by thugs on a snowy day, is informed by Drei that Takuma has taken the Onikirimaru from the shrine. Eins finds Tamaki and Takuma in the forest and prepares to attack them, but he is stopped by Ryou and decides to fall back. Ryou, after advising Tamaki and Takuma to leave the village, reveals to them that he is part of the Inukai family, mentioning that Shinji was adopted into that family but is the twin brother of Mitsuru. Tamaki and Takuma decide to take matters in their own hands instead.
9	"The Eternal Promise"; Transliteration: "Yūkyū no Yakusoku" (Japanese: 悠久の約束)	November 25, 2012
Kiyono, who comes out of hiding thanks to Ryou, reveals to Tamaki and Takuma that not only is she not actually a student at the school, but she also works for Ashiya, all to keep a close eye on Tamaki. Afterwards, Tamaki and Takuma head to the school to hide, but Takuma's heart is slowly succumbing to his powers. Mahiro, Yuuichi and Shinji manage to find Tamaki, but Takuma keeps his guard up when he sees the three. Tamaki shares her vision of the Guardian and the Tamayori Princess, convincing Mahiro, Yuuichi and Shinji that Takuma is not a monster. As Mahiro, Yuuichi and Shinji leave the school on the way to the hideout of the Logos, they chance upon Ryou, who reveals that he is actually a Guardian and offers to join them in their cause. Drei shows the rest of the Logos all five Artifacts and sends Suguru to deal with the Mahiro, Yuuichi, Shinji and Ryou. Drei and Zwei then betray Aria and Vier with a surprise attack. Mahiro, Yuuichi, Shinji and Ryou tell Suguru of the current situation with Tamaki and Takuma, to which Suguru reveals that he wanted to obtain the five Artifacts but realizes that he is too late.
10	"The Power of the Gods"; Transliteration: "Kami no Chikara" (Japanese: カミの力)	December 2, 2012
Eins chases Tamaki and Takuma in the forest, believing that they attacked Aria. Takuma is forced to fight Eins, unlocking his full power and partially transforming into an oni. This causes Takuma to lose control and grab hold of Tamaki. However, Tamaki reaches out to Takuma and kisses him to revert him back to human. Drei is shown to have captured and imprisoned Vier. Mahiro and Ryou take on Zwei, while Yuuichi, Suguru, and Shinji are trapped in a realm created by Drei. After Takuma defeats Eins, Shizuki and Ashiya arrive to take Tamaki back to her room, where Shizuki later explains to Tamaki that the only way to completely seal the Onikirimaru and save Takuma is to sacrifice herself. O-chan goes to the storehouse to Takuma, who can see Tamaki through O-chan's eyes. Tamaki hears Takuma apologize to himself for failing to protect her.
11	"Scarlet Fragments"; Transliteration: "Hiiro no Kakera" (Japanese: 緋色の欠片)	December 9, 2012
After Mahiro and Ryou are defeated by Zwei, Drei puts Mahiro and Ryou in the realm with Yuuichi, Suguru and Shinji. Drei plans to obtain the Onikirimaru once and for all. Mitsuru informs Tamaki that the ceremonial offering will start at sunset. Tamaki runs into the forest filled with red leaves falling to the ground and finds Takuma, who promises to be by her side no matter what. Takuma kisses Tamaki when she starts crying, and she hopes to see him again in her next life. As Tamaki later performs the ceremonial offering using the Onikirimaru, she realizes that Takuma is also going to be a sacrifice. Aria frees the Guardians by giving them the five Artifacts and allowing them to leave, and Aria soon realizes that Drei is one of the four Wisemen. Eins stops the ceremonial offering and faces Takuma in an intense battle. Takuma transforms into an oni with full control of his powers and is able to defeat Eins in one hit. However, Eins recovers from the attack, strikes Shizuki with the Onikirimaru and quickly leaves the shrine without a trace. Shizuki dies after apologizing to Tamaki for deceiving her in performing the ceremonial offering.
12	"The Guardians' Awakening"; Transliteration: "Shugosha no Kakusei" (Japanese: 守護者の覚醒)	December 16, 2012
Tamaki fully awakens as the Tamayori Princess, in which O-chan becomes her tiara and garment, and the Guardians each give her the Artifacts to add onto her garment. As Tamaki and the Guardians reach the forest, they see Eins fully transformed into an oni due to the power of the Onikirimaru. While the Guardians struggle against Eins, Ashiya tells Tamaki and Ryou that the power of the Onikirimaru should be used for absolute justice. Ryou, who believes that this power should not exist in this world, is enraged and begins to fight Ashiya. Mitsuru protects Shinji from getting hurt, though this causes her to be injured in the process. Takuma faces Eins in a head-to-head match, and Mahiro takes on Zwei alone. Drei, with his attacks dispelled by Tamaki, later manages to obtain the Onikirimaru and prepares to attack Aria. However, Vier, who has escaped from Drei's imprisonment, defends Aria. Mahiro is finally able to kill Zwei in the end.
13	"The Eternal Pledge"; Transliteration: "Towa no Chikai" (Japanese: 永遠(とわ)の誓い)	December 23, 2012
Drei absorbs Eins's powers back into the Onikirimaru, causing Eins to pass away. Drei, who has long awaited for this moment in time, unleashes the power of the Onikirimaru and transforms into a giant monster. Vowing to protect the Tamayori Princess, the six Guardians try to attack and defeat Drei, but to no success. However, Tamaki uses her powers to enhance the strength of her Guardians, which allows them to finally obliterate Drei once and for all. The Guardians are surprised that the Onikirimaru is seen floating in the sky over the lake, so Tamaki uses her powers to destroy the Onikirimaru from existence. The Guardians thank Tamaki for the good deed she has now done, but their duties to protect her are not over yet, since the Bureau of Medicine might come back into the picture. As Tamaki prepares to leave the village to move back with her parents, who have returned from their work overseas, she has a brief moment with Takuma before saying farewell to her six Guardians. Tamaki later visits the village to perform a ceremonial offering dance. While in the forest filled with red leaves at sunset, Tamaki tells Takuma that she wishes him to be by her side forever.

== Radio ==
The radio program, titled Radio Hiiro no Kakera ~Koryo Gakuen Broadcasting Room~ (ラジオ緋色の欠片〜紅陵学院放送室〜), has been airing on Radio Osaka every Tuesday at 24:00 since January 3, 2012. It has also been streamed every Wednesday on HiBiKi Radio Station and Lantis Internet Radio since January 4 of the same year. Furthermore, it was scheduled to be revamped in October of the same year to coincide with the broadcast of the second season of the TV anime. The title of the second season is Radio Hiiro no Kakera ~Koryo Gakuen Health Room~ (ラジオ緋色の欠片〜紅陵学院保健室〜).
