= Persona 2: Eternal Punishment =

2000 video game

- North American cover art, featuring the protagonist Maya Amano along with her initial Persona Maia
- Developer: Atlus
- Publisher: Atlus
- Directors: Takeshi Tominaga; Shoji Meguro (PSP)
- Producer: Kouji Okada
- Artists: Kazuma Kaneko; Shigenori Soejima; Masayuki Doi (PSP)
- Writer: Tadashi Satomi
- Composers: Toshiko Tasaki; Kenichi Tsuchiya; Masaki Kurokawa; Toshiki Konishi (PSP); Atsushi Kitajoh (PSP)
- Series: Persona
- Platforms: PlayStation; PlayStation Portable
- Release: PlayStation: JP: June 29, 2000; NA: December 2000; PlayStation Portable: JP: May 17, 2012
- Genre: Role-playing
- Mode: Single-player

Persona 2: Eternal Punishment (Note: Known in Japanese as Perusona Tsū: Batsu (ペルソナ2 罰; lit. Persona 2: Punishment)) is a 2000 role-playing video game developed and published by Atlus for the PlayStation. It is a direct sequel to Persona 2: Innocent Sin and chronologically the third installment in the Persona series, a subseries of the Megami Tensei franchise. The game was later remade by Atlus for the PlayStation Portable. This version, released in Japan in 2012, did not receive an overseas release. The PlayStation version was released on PlayStation Network in 2013.

Eternal Punishment takes place in the fictional Japanese city of Sumaru. Taking place a few months after Innocent Sin, the game follows magazine reporter Maya Amano as she investigates the Joker Curse, a malign phenomenon where people's wishes and rumors are coming true and causing chaos. During her investigations, she and others who join her gain the ability to summon Personas, personified aspects of their personalities. The gameplay features turn-based battle gameplay, where characters use their Personas in battle against demons, and a separate Rumor system, where rumors spread around the city can influence events in the characters' favor, either bad or good.

Halfway through the production of Innocent Sin, writer Tadashi Satomi felt that a fresh point of view was needed in addition to Tatsuya, laying the groundwork for Eternal Punishment. Producer Kouji Okada, artist Kazuma Kaneko and composers Toshiko Tasaki, Kenichi Tsuchiya and Masaki Kurokawa also returned. While reusing assets from Innocent Sin, the gameplay and Rumor system were improved upon. The game's theme song, "Change Your Way", was written by English singer-songwriter Elisha La'Verne based on the game's premise. Reception of the game in Japan and the West has generally been positive, with reviewers appreciating improvements over Innocent Sin, the plot, the gameplay systems, and the improved localization compared to the original Persona.

== Gameplay ==
The player's party (here consisting of the protagonist Maya, Katsuya, Ulala, and Baofu) fights enemy demons in turn-based battles.

Persona 2: Eternal Punishment is a role-playing game where the player takes control of a group of characters exploring the fictional city of Sumaru. The camera follows the party from an adjustable angled overhead perspective. The city in general is navigated using an overworld map. A key element to the story and gameplay is the Rumor system: after the characters hear a rumor, they can spread that rumor around the city using certain characters, and those rumors can grant the characters special items or other positive or negative effects.

Battles consist of both story-related boss fights and random encounters with standard enemies. Battles are turn-based, with the player characters and enemies moving around a small battle arena to perform actions. Once the player has laid out their strategy in the battle menu, the characters perform their assigned actions until the battle ends with victory for one side or the player pauses the action to change strategies. Instead of the grid-based battle system from the original Persona, party members and enemy units act in the same phase of a turn, rather than being restricted by their placement on the field.

During battle, players cast spells using an assigned Persona: each spell drains a character's Spell Point meter. Each Persona has different elemental strengths and weaknesses, and different Personas can be used for defense, healing or elemental attacks. While a Persona is originally quite weak, if it is used enough, it will achieve a higher rank, with Rank 8 being the highest possible. As the Persona's rank is raised, that Persona is able to cast more powerful spells. In addition to individual actions, the player can align characters to trigger a Fusion Spell: when two or more party members use a certain sequence of spells, they will automatically team up to generate a powerful attack or help the party survive in battle. During battles, both characters and Personas earn experience points. The player has the option to activate an Auto-battle option, having combat play out without player interaction.

During battle, the player can converse with enemies, though they are restricted to a single set of dialogue options instead of four as in the original Persona. If the player succeeds in talking with the enemy using the right character, it both causes the enemy to leave the battlefield and gains a spell card (a Tarot card linked to one of the Arcanum or family of Personas), which can be used to create Personas in a location called the Velvet Room. In the Velvet Room, the player can summon a new Persona that belongs to a spell card's particular Persona family group. As a character gains experience levels, more powerful Personas from a spell card's group become available. In addition to pre-set spell cards, the player can also obtain blank skill cards by forming contracts with enemies through the right conversation. These blank skill cards can be tailored to fit a chosen Persona family.

== Synopsis ==
=== Setting and characters ===
Set a few months after the ending of Persona 2: Innocent Sin, Eternal Punishment takes place in 1999 in Sumaru, a fictional seaside city in Japan with a population of 1.28 million, its own television stations, and a structure left over from its foundations during the Warring States period. Many of the characters come from two high schools in Sumaru: Seven Sisters, a prestigious school that is the setting of Innocent Sin, and the less-prestigious Kasugayama. All the protagonists wield Personas, manifestations of their personalities. The ability to wield Personas was granted to them by Philemon, a benevolent personification of humanity's Collective Unconscious. The events of Innocent Sin are said to stem from a contest between Philemon and his opposite Nyarlathotep to see if humans could find a higher purpose in life despite embracing contradictory emotions. During the events of Innocent Sin, Nyarlathotep influenced events in his favor and all the world except Sumaru City was destroyed. In order to reset events, the party used the power of the Collective Unconscious to will the key event that caused the events of Innocent Sin out of existence in exchange for their memories of those events: this created an alternative timeline, with the Innocent Sin timeline existing as a separate "Other Side". A key element to the story of Eternal Punishment is Kegare, a negative energy that can possess humans and trigger rises in crime and the perpetuation of more Kegare.

The main protagonist of Eternal Punishment is Maya Amano, a reporter for teen magazine "Coolest" who was a playable character in Innocent Sin. She is joined on her adventure by others, including people who were involved in the events of Innocent Sin: Tatsuya Suou, a student at Seven Sisters and the main protagonist of Innocent Sin; Ulala Serizawa, a school friend of the protagonist Maya's and an aspiring fashion designer; Baofu, a former prosecuting attorney out for revenge against the Taiwanese Mafia; and Katsuya Suou, Tatsuya's older brother and a sergeant in the Sumaru City Police Department. Returning antagonists include Tatsuya Sudou, a madman who was involved in the incident that precipitated the events of Innocent Sin; and Takahisa Kandori, a former servant of Nyarlathotep and the main antagonist of Revelations: Persona who is resurrected through the power of Kotodama. Kandori in turn serves Tatsuzou Sudou, Tatsuya Sudou's father. Two other central characters from Revelations: Persona, Kei Nanjō and Eriko Kirishima, act as supporting characters and optional playable characters. (Note: In the localized version of Eternal Punishment, the protagonists of Persona use the given names used in the original Persona's localization: Kei/Nate Nanjō, Eriko/Ellen Kirishima, Takahisa/Guido Kandori, and others. For the sake of consistency between articles, the original names shall be used throughout.) The other protagonists of Innocent Sin (Eikichi "Michel" Mishina, Lisa "Ginko" Silverman, Jun Kashihara) play minor supporting roles.

=== Plot ===
Eternal Punishment begins when the protagonist Maya is sent to write a story about the Joker phenomenon: according to rumor, if someone phones their own number, the Joker will kill on request. Going to Seven Sisters, she, Ulala, and Katsuya find the school principal murdered by the Joker. The Joker then attacks them, forcing each of them to summon their Personas. After the Joker knocks them out, Philemon contacts them and warns of a growing danger to the city. After waking, the three pursue the Joker into the school clock tower, where he attempts to force a student to remember the events of Innocent Sin. They are saved by Tatsuya, who tells the protagonist Maya to forget about him. After Katsuya is removed from the case by his superior Captain Shimazu, he teams up with the protagonist Maya and Ulala to find the Joker. They eventually ally with Baofu, who believes that Tatsuya Sudou and his father Tatsuzou are involved with the Joker. Going to the mental institution where Sudou is held, they discover that Tatsuzou sent Taiwanese Mafia hitmen to kill Sudou. Once confronted, Sudou admits that he is the Joker, and reveals that he is attempting to trigger the reappearance of the Other Side. Pursuing him to the Sky Museum, the party runs into Tatsuya and saves Jun from Sudou after Sudou sets the building on fire. After escaping with the museum's visitors on a blimp, an injured Sudou makes a final attack that damages the blimp before Tatsuya kills him. When the party regroup, Tatsuya has vanished.

Upon their return, the party continues to investigate Tatsuzou's activities, and find that negative feelings are turning other people into new "Jokers", who are in turn being kidnapped by Tatsuzou's agents. The party eventually learn that Tatsuzou and a secret organization he leads, the New World Order, are manipulating Sumaru's government, corporations, and media for his own ends. After this, they hear of two others, Kei and Eriko, investigating the New World Order and their links with the Joker curse and an increasingly prevalent fortune telling craze used to manipulate the spread of rumors: they are involved due to the possible involvement of Kandori, a former enemy of theirs, who is posing as Tatsuzou's secretary. Depending on the party's actions at this point, either Kei or Eriko will join their party as they go to investigate the holding area for the new Jokers. Upon arriving, they find Eikichi captured by Kandori while looking for a friend. While Kandori attempts to awaken Eikichi's memories of the Other Side, Tatsuya intervenes and enables the party and Eikichi to escape. The group then save Lisa and her girl group from their promoter, another Order member, with help from Tatsuya, who again vanishes afterwards. Through a friendly informant in the Police, they learn the New World Order's ultimate goal: to raise Sumaru City in the rumor-generated spaceship "Torifune", and trigger the destruction of the Earth's surface by sacred dragons by creating a concentration of Kegare to create a new world free of sin. The only way to stop the plan's fulfillment is defeating the Order.

After failing to corner Tatsuzou and puzzled about Tatsuya's motives, the party finally persuade Tatsuya to reveal the truth. During the original confrontation with Nyarlathotep, the protagonist Maya was killed, prompting the rest of the group (Tatsuya, Lisa, Jun and Eikichi) to reset events. Tatsuya refused to forget the events of the Other Side, creating a dangerous loophole: if all the other members of the original group could be forced to remember, the Other Side would be brought back into existence, destroying the present reality. After revealing this, Tatsuya is allowed to join the party in place of either Kei or Eriko. After returning to Sumaru proper, the city is raised by Tatsuzou as part of Torifune. Successfully infiltrating Torifune and defeating Tatsuzou and his "god" Gozen, the city returns to the surface, but the party are drawn into the Collective Unconscious by Nyarlathotep. Making their way into his domain, they discover Nyarlathotep has kidnapped Eikichi, Lisa and Jun in an effort to force their memories of the Other Side into reality. Defeating the Shadow Selves guarding them, the party saves each of them, then confront Nyarlathotep, who mocks Tatsuya for refusing to fulfill his part of Philemon's agreement. After Nyarlathotep is defeated, Tatsuya fulfills his side of the bargain, and after saying his final goodbyes separates his Other Side consciousness from his current self. With the city returned to normal, the party return to their normal lives, with the protagonist Maya briefly seeing Tatsuya but choosing not to contact him.

== Development ==
The concept for Eternal Punishment emerged during the writing for Innocent Sin. Script writer Tadashi Satomi felt that the draft gave him the impression of needing an alternative point of view to that of the main hero, forming the basis for Eternal Punishment's plot. To foreshadow this, the team showed the main characters from Eternal Punishment through minor roles in Innocent Sin. Eternal Punishment began full development after the release of Innocent Sin. Innocent Sin and Eternal Punishment both used the same game engine and structure. Kouji Okada, Innocent Sin's producer, returned in the same role. When developing Eternal Punishment, the development team took what they learned from Innocent Sin and used it to improve the gameplay and the Rumor system. One of the biggest concerns when making Eternal Punishment was how much the development staff wanted to include, which went well beyond their original plans. The in-game cutscenes were co-produced by Digital Media Lab and Earthy Productions.

The overarching theme of Eternal Punishment, as with Persona and Innocent Sin, was exploration of the human psyche and the main characters discovering their true selves. While Innocent Sin focused on the protagonists as teenagers, Eternal Punishment looked at the protagonists as adults: for its central character theme, Eternal Punishment focused on how people realize their true selves as adults faced with reality. A theme carried over from Innocent Sin was the "power of Kotodama", the Japanese belief that words can influence the physical and spiritual world, with this power manifesting through the spreading of rumors. Terms and concepts used in the games, including Persona, Shadows and the character Philemon, were drawn from Jungian psychology and archetypes. The character of Nyarlathotep, who had made a cameo appearance as a Persona in the original game, was inspired by the character of the same name from H. P. Lovecraft's Cthulhu Mythos. Other antagonists and enemy creatures in the games were also drawn from the Cthulhu Mythos and played a key role in the narrative.

The main characters were designed by Kazuma Kaneko, while secondary characters were designed by Shigenori Soejima. The protagonists of Eternal Punishment were adults and so could not be given a single standardized outfit as the high school protagonists of Innocent Sin had been. While designing the outfits for Eternal Punishment, Kaneko tried to keep an image of normal adults in mind, but in doing so was restricted when trying to portray the characters' heroism. In the end, he designed the characters to look normal while having a "different feeling" from other people. One of the characters that helped drive this style home was Ulala, who was a minor character in Innocent Sin and a main protagonist in Eternal Punishment. The Joker character from Innocent Sin was carried over into Eternal Punishment: the new Joker's actions were made increasingly murderous, creating a contrast between the two incarnations.

=== Port and localization ===
Eternal Punishment was first announced in April at the 2000 Tokyo Game Show. During the show, Atlus held a talk spot hosted by Kouji Okada and Kazuma Kaneko, and featuring an appearance by Elisha La'Verne, the singer responsible for the game's theme song. Unlike Innocent Sin, Eternal Punishment was chosen for release in the West. Its localization was significantly different from that of the original Persona, released in 1996. Persona received numerous alterations for its overseas release, including altering character and location names. For Eternal Punishment and future titles, Atlus decided to remain as faithful as possible to the Japanese version. According to Atlus, the game marks a "halfway point" in their localization history: while more faithful to the Japanese version than the original Persona, it still needed to take that previous localization into account for the naming of returning characters. Its release in the West was officially announced the following month at that year's Electronic Entertainment Expo, with Atlus previously teasing it as a "secret RPG". The localization was released on December 22, 2000. Eternal Punishment received a limited reprint exclusive to Amazon.com in 2008 to celebrate the release of Persona 4.

Eternal Punishment was remade for the PlayStation Portable. Like the remake of Innocent Sin, it was directed by Shoji Meguro. The original plan at Atlus was to have Innocent Sin and Eternal Punishment released as a single game, but both could not fit onto a single UMD. Even before the completion of Innocent Sin's remake, when there were no plans for a remake of Eternal Punishment, Meguro was keen to make one if the opportunity arose. For the remake, the team had two points of reference: the original version, and the remake of Innocent Sin. The team carried over most of the features implemented Innocent Sin's remake while further simplifying and streamlining the mechanics, aiming for a "culmination" to Persona 2 as a whole. A large portion of the initial work was playing through the original version. A new opening animation was created by anime production company Madhouse. In addition to the gameplay modifications, a new scenario was added focusing on Tatsuya's activities before he joined the party. Satomi, after having written the script for a downloadable quest for Innocent Sin's remake, was asked whether he would like to write a new scenario for the Eternal Punishment's remake, and accepted willingly. During the writing process, Satomi suggested giving the protagonist Maya dialogue, but this was vetoed as Persona protagonists were silent without exception. The scenario's new characters were designed by Masayuki Doi.

The remake was announced in February 2012 by Famitsu. For the packaging, Kaneko was asked to design a new piece of key art. The artwork features the protagonist Maya and her initial Persona Maia. The remake was not released outside Japan due to "unusual circumstances". Game Informer included the game on its list of "RPGs Released Late In The PSP's Life Cycle", games that were likely never to see a release due to the flagging western PSP market. In response to the decision not to localize the remake, the original version was released on PlayStation Network in 2013. As part of the announcement, PlayStation Blog released a guide showing which characters had received name changes in the original localization. Intended to be playable on PSP, PlayStation Vita and PlayStation 3, a fault at release meant only the PS3 version was playable, which was fixed after players complained about it.

=== Music ===
The original music for Eternal Punishment was composed by Toshiko Tasaki, Kenichi Tsuchiya and Masaki Kurokawa, the composers for Innocent Sin. As with Innocent Sin, Tsuchiya found the writing process difficult for a number of reasons. Tsuchiya's favorite piece for the score, which was carried over from Innocent Sin, was "Maya's Theme". The tune has remained popular with the Persona fan base: Tsuchiya has attributed its popularity to the enduring nature of the Persona series as a whole, and compared it to a fashionable item of the time that now requires a "certain courage" to wear in later times. The game's theme song, "Change your Way", was written and sung by British singer-songwriter Elisha La'Verne, and the music was composed by T.Kura. La'Verne wrote the song with the premise of Eternal Punishment in mind, and so she wanted the song to sound positive. For inspiration, she drew on her experiences of walking round London and seeing homeless people who appeared unable to improve their status: the song's theme is that there is always a way out of a bad situation and you can change that situation for the better. The title also stemmed from this concept. Together with Innocent Sin, Eternal Punishment is one of the first entries in the Megami Tensei series to feature voice acting.

For the PSP version, the music was remixed by Toshiki Konishi, Ryota Kozuka and Atsushi Kitajoh, who also worked on the remixed music for Innocent Sin's port. The team, while remixing the music, did not want to destroy the original's foundation. The ruling concept, as defined by Konishi, was "not too far and not too close to the original". For the opening animation, Meguro requested Konishi to personally remix the game's original opening theme. It was the first time he had been put in charge of an opening theme, and it proved troublesome for him, as he needed to rerecord the vocals and make sure he did justice to the original version. For Kitajoh, one of the most notable arrangements he did was for "Maya's Theme": Meguro, who had previously remixed this track for Persona 3: FES, asked for a remix with a faster tempo and hard rock elements incorporated. The new scenario also used remixed music from the original game instead of new tracks.

== Reception ==
Reception

Aggregate scores
Aggregator	Score
GameRankings	PS1: 84% (18 reviews)
Metacritic	PS1: 83/100 (11 reviews)

Review scores
Publication	Score
Famitsu	8/10, 8/10, 8/10, 8/10 (PS1); 7/10, 8/10, 8/10, 8/10 (PSP)
Game Informer	8/10 (PS1)
GamePro	5/5 (PS1)
GameSpot	8.5/10 (PS1)
IGN	8.2/10 (PS1)
Next Generation	4/5 (PS1)
PSX Nation	89% (PS1)
RPGFan	89% (PS1)

During its first week of release in Japan, Eternal Punishment reached the top of Japanese sales charts, selling 106,563 copies. The following week, the game was still in the top five, selling a further 16,333 and bringing sales to 122,896. By the end of the year, it ranked at #60 in Japan's best-selling titles of the year, with final sales totaling 200,103 units. The PSP remake debuted at #3 in Japanese sales charts, selling 24,547 copies. The following week, it sold a further 4,885, but had dropped to #20. By October 2012, as stated in Index Holding's announced sales data, the game had sold just 60,000 copies, putting it well behind other Atlus titles such as Etrian Odyssey IV: Legends of the Titan for the Nintendo 3DS and Persona 4 Golden for the Vita.

Famitsu praised the improvements made to the gameplay over Innocent Sin, calling the experience "thrilling" and citing the story as generally enjoyable. One comment was that the game's aesthetics did not deviate much from those of Innocent Sin. The magazine's later review of the remake was also fairly positive, finding the atmosphere somber and the battles entertaining, stating that the reviewers appreciated being able to play both parts of Persona 2 on PSP. IGN's David Smith, while noting the game's slower pace than other contemporary RPGs, he generally enjoyed the plot's mature themes and the Rumor and Persona systems. Summing up, he said: "Its unique visual style, its unusual characters, and its absorbing gameplay systems make it a game to kill plenty of hours with this winter."

RPGFan's Ken Chu, despite finding the camera's movement speed awkward and disliking some aspects of the graphics, found the characters "reasonably strong" and generally praised the gameplay. He rounded off the review by saying that, because of its difficulty, it may put off more casual RPG players, but that other players "[were] strongly recommended to check it out." GameSpot's Jeff Gerstmann generally shared these points of praise with other reviewers, despite finding some aspects of gameplay potentially unbalanced and the graphics unappealing, said that "if [players] can manage to get over these flaws, you'll find an RPG that dares to be different, but not at the sake of an interesting story and exciting gameplay." A common point of praise with reviewers was the improved localization when compared to that of Persona, although opinions on the voice acting varied and faults in the grammar were mentioned.

Jeff Lundrigan of Next Generation stated, "It ain't flashy, but this is as thought-provoking, deep, and engrossing an RPG as you'll find." It was a runner-up for GameSpot's annual "Best Role-Playing Game" award among console games, losing to Chrono Cross.

== Legacy ==
Eternal Punishment was enough of a success to reestablish the Persona franchise's minor presence in the West. The next title in the Persona series, Persona 3 for the PlayStation 2, was released in 2006; unlike Eternal Punishment, it was released with the Shin Megami Tensei franchise moniker in all non-Japan regions, a branding that would continue for the Persona series until Persona 5 in 2017. The game, along with Innocent Sin, received a spin-off manga titled Persona: Tsumi to Batsu (ペルソナ 罪と罰; Persona: Sin and Punishment), featuring new characters from Seven Sisters. Its 2011 reprint featured new content connecting the manga to Innocent Sin. In 2009, Atlus and Bbmf developed and published a mobile version of the game titled Persona 2: Eternal Punishment – Infinity Mask (ペルソナ2 罰 インフィニティマスク, Perusona Tsū: Batsu Infiniti Masuku). Similar to the mobile port of Innocent Sin, it incorporates the gameplay functions of the console version while tailoring them to a mobile device. The protagonist Maya Amano and Lisa Silverman were later featured in an internal tech demo for the graphics engine used in Shin Megami Tensei: Nocturne.
