= Tomomi Isomura =

Japanese voice actress

- 磯村 知美
- Born: May 6 Kanagawa Prefecture, Japan
- Occupation: Voice actress
- Years active: 2004–present
- Agent: Max Mix
- Height: 159 cm (5 ft 3 in)

Tomomi Isomura (磯村 知美, Isomura Tomomi; born May 6), also known by the nickname "Isotchi" (イソッチ), is a Japanese voice actress. Her prominent roles include Shōko Kirishima in Baka and Test, Aria Rozenburg in Hiiro no Kakera, and Makoto Nanaya in BlazBlue. She was associated with Deux Plus. She joined Max Mix in March 2010.

== Filmography ==
=== Anime ===
List of voice performances in anime
Year	Series	Role	Notes	Source
2004	Ragnarok the Animation	Boy		
2005	Rebirth Moon Divergence	Juna		
2010	Hidamari Sketch × Hoshimittsu	Lady teacher	Ep. 3	
2010–11	Baka and Test	Shōko Kirishima		
2012	Hiiro no Kakera	Aria Rozenburg		
2013	Bakumatsu Gijinden Roman	Ohana		
2013	Photo Kano	Tokiwa		
2013	BlazBlue Alter Memory	Makoto Nanaya		
2014	D-Frag!	Takako's second sister		
2014	Hakuōki Dai-nishō Shikon Sōkyū film			
2015	The Kawai Complex Guide to Manors and Hostel Behavior		special edition	
2015	Re-Kan!			
2018	Persona 5: The Animation	Hifumi Togo		

=== Video games ===
List of voice performances in video games
Year	Title	Role	Notes	Source
2006–12	Hiiro no Kakera series	Aria Rozenburg		
2007	Diario Rebirth Moon Legend	Juju, Sean		
2007	Mist of Chaos	Kishiri		
2007	Spectral Gene	Fiora		
2007	Yōkihiden ~ayakashi gentō-banashi~ (妖鬼姫伝~あやかし幻灯話~)	Seion Mikado		
2007–14	Record of Agarest War	Murmina		
2009–present	BlazBlue series	Makoto Nanaya		
2012	Robotics;Notes			
2013	Valkyria Chronicles Duel	Ryuna	online game	
2013	Steins;Gate Senkei Kōsoku no Phenogram	Chikane Akiha		
2013	Xblaze Code: Embryo	Yuki Himezuru		
2013	Conception II: Children of the Seven Stars	Nazuna		
2014	Guilty Gear Xrd -Sign-	April		
2014	I Thought It'd Be Harem Paradise But It Turned Out Yandere Hell	Toutomi Kanna		
2015	Wonderland Wars	Roy Mameru		
2016	Persona 5	Hifumi Togo	Host of Persona monthly publicity program from 2014 to 2017	
