= Mafia Kajita =

Japanese writer, radio personality, actor, and voice actor

- マフィア 梶田
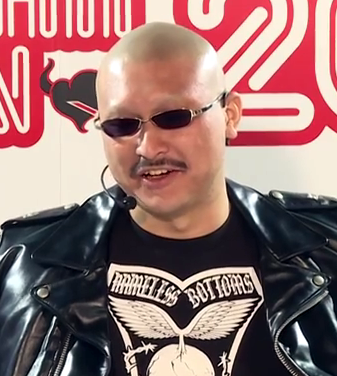
- Kajita during a live stream at Akihabara UDX Theater in 2016
- Born: Ryūki Kajita (梶田 隆基); October 14, 1987 (age 38); Shanghai, China
- Other name: SP Tanaka (SP田中)
- Occupations: Writer; radio personality; actor; voice actor
- Website: ameblo.jp/mafiakajita/

Ryūki Kajita (梶田 隆基, Kajita Ryūki; born October 14, 1987), known professionally as Mafia Kajita (マフィア 梶田), is a Japanese writer, radio personality, actor, and voice actor. Kajita is a writer and radio personality for the Japanese gaming news website 4gamer.

== Career ==
While attending a boarding high school, Kajita spent time reading gaming magazines and noticed a job opening for a game writer. After being transferred to a different high school, Kajita spent time on video games, anime, and manga, and attended a vocational school after graduating. He was accepted into Vantan as a writer for the games department, where he was later introduced to Tomokazu Sugita by a senior writer.

== Writing credits ==
=== Video games ===
| Year | Title | Notes | Ref(s) |
|---|---|---|---|
| 2012 | Corpse Party: Sweet Sachiko's Hysteric Birthday Bash | Scenario writer | |

== Filmography ==
=== Radio ===
| Year | Title | Notes | Ref(s) |
|---|---|---|---|
| 2009 | Tomokazu Sugita's AniGera! Di-doon | Assistant; credited as SP Tanaka | |
| 2010 | Radio 4gamer | Host | |

=== Television ===
| Year | Title | Role | Network | Notes | Ref(s) |
|---|---|---|---|---|---|
| 2017 | Love Kome | Forest Bear | Tokyo MX | Voice in anime | |
| 2018 | Magical × Heroine Magimajo Pures! | Security guard | TV Tokyo | Episode 35 | |
| 2020 | Warlords of Sigrdrifa | Gurasan | Tokyo MX, BS11 | Voice in anime | |
| 2025 | Dekin no Mogura | Sukekiyo | Tokyo MX, BS11 | Voice in anime | |

=== Film ===
| Year | Title | Role | Notes | Ref(s) |
|---|---|---|---|---|
| 2010 | Wonderful World | Tatsunoki | Minor role | |
| 2016 | Shin Godzilla | Bodyguard | Cameo | |
| 2024 | City Hunter | Umibōzu | | |

=== Video games ===
| Year | Title | Role | Notes | Ref(s) |
|---|---|---|---|---|
| 2021 | Fate/Grand Order | Zanzaburou | Voice | |
