= Shigenori Soejima =

Japanese character artist (born 1974)

- 副島 成記
- Born: February 24, 1974 (age 52); Kanagawa Prefecture, Japan
- Occupation: Character artist
- Years active: 1995–present
- Employer: Atlus
- Notable work: Persona; Catherine

Shigenori Soejima (副島 成記, Soejima Shigenori; born February 24, 1974) is a Japanese character artist best known for his work in the Persona series of role-playing video games by Atlus. He initially worked in minor roles on several games after joining Atlus and took over as series art director from his mentor Kazuma Kaneko with Persona 3 in 2006.

== Early life ==
Shigenori Soejima was born in Kanagawa Prefecture on February 24, 1974. His family moved quite often during his childhood due to his father's office work: a month after his birth, his family moved to Machida, Tokyo, and in future moves relocated to Fukuoka Prefecture, then back to Machida and then to Suginami. During his time in Fukuoka, Soejima attended kindergarten school. While there, he developed a taste for drawing and practiced his skills by copying the characters from Doraemon, a manga series of which he was fond. As his family went through further moves while he was attending first-grade elementary school, he found the frequent changes in his environment unsettling, and became slightly introverted due to not being able to make friends. His drawing became a conciliatory activity during this period. For these early drawings, Soejima used a notepad and ballpoint pens. Eventually, he made some friends in elementary school, who shared his enthusiasm for Doraemon and encouraged him in his pursuit of a career as a cartoonist.

During junior high, Soejima developed a love of video games of the time: one of the games he saw was Shin Megami Tensei II, which was recommended to him by a friend. This, and seeing the detailed animation in Nausicaä of the Valley of the Wind, helped influence his future ambitions and character design. Upon recommendation, he entered Tama University after completing his junior high education, earning high marks. While there, he began experimenting with painting alongside his cartoons, now wanting to pursue a career as an animator and character designer. In his second year, he was working part-time and used his wages to buy his first PC to play games, which would prove a great influence for him. During his third year in high school, he began dedicated training in painting at Tokyo University of the Arts, then later gained a place at the Illustration Department of the Tokyo Design Academy after failing to qualify for a place at an arts college. It was at this point that he decided to pursue a professional career in illustration.

== Atlus ==
He was hired by Atlus upon graduation after impressing Kazuma Kaneko, the studio's art director, during an interview. His first job at Atlus was creating pixel art for Purikura Photo Booth. Soejima's next several projects involved minor work under Kaneko. In this capacity, he worked on Shin Megami Tensei: Devil Summoner, Revelations: Persona and Kartia: The Word of Fate, alongside minor roles in overseeing the PlayStation ports of the first three Shin Megami Tensei games. He acted as sub-character designer for Devil Summoner: Soul Hackers, the Persona 2 games Innocent Sin and Eternal Punishment, and was involved in graphics work on Shin Megami Tensei: Nocturne. His first job as art director and character designer was on Atlus' PlayStation 2 strategy game Stella Deus: The Gate of Eternity. Having eagerly pursued the job after hearing about it from rumors within the company, he was initially overwhelmed as he had a large amount of work to do on the title and had yet to refine his drawing style. By looking back at the days when he drew for fun, he managed to establish his drawing style.

For Persona 3, Kaneko put Soejima in charge of art direction for the Persona series, as Kaneko wanted Soejima to grow as a designer. In a later interview, Soejima said that while he respected and admired Kaneko, he never consciously imitated the latter's work, and eventually settled into the role of pleasing the fans of the Persona series, approaching character design with the idea of creating something new rather than referring back to Kaneko's work. Soejima felt a degree of pressure when designing the characters as he did not want to disappoint the series' fanbase. The goal was to make Megami Tensei fans feel gratified that they had supported the Persona series. Soejima returned to design the character Metis for Persona 3 FES. He returned in these roles for the several Persona spin-off games, as well as Catherine (2011) and Metaphor: ReFantazio (2024).

== Design and influences ==
Several influences on Soejima's design and career were the work of Fujiko Fujio, the manga and anime franchise Patlabor, and video games such as Street Fighter II. For his character design, Soejima uses real people he has met or seen, looking at what their appearance says about their personality. If his designs come too close to the people he has seen, he does a rough sketch while keeping the personality of the person in mind. For his work on Stella Deus, Soejima used brushes to achieve the right feel for the game's fantasy setting. While he started with brushes for Persona 3, he felt it did not work with the setting and switched to cel shading, which was also used later for Persona 4.

His designs for Persona 3 and Persona 4 vary significantly: he thought of Persona 3 as being similar in aesthetic to a fantastical manga, citing its use of mecha-like Persona and Mitsuru's flamboyant styling, while the setting of Persona 4 meant its environment and character design were a lot more grounded. Persona 5 was, in Soejima's view, a natural evolution from the art style of Persona 4. For his work on Persona Q, his first time working with a deformed Chibi style due to its links with the Etrian Odyssey series, Soejima took into account what fans felt about the characters. A crucial part of his design technique was looking at what made a character stand out, then adjusting those features so they remained recognizable even with the redesign.

During his work on the Persona series, Soejima has used key colors to help illustrate the games' aesthetics and themes. For example, Persona 3 had a dark atmosphere and serious characters, so the primary color was chosen as blue to reflect these and the urban setting. In contrast, Persona 4 had a lighter tone and characters while also sporting a murder-mystery plot, so the color yellow was chosen to represent both the lighter tones and to evoke a "warning" signal. Persona 5 used the color red to convey a harsh feeling in contrast to the previous Persona titles and tie in with the game's story themes. In 2014, Soejima said Persona 3 was his favorite entry in the series and Aigis being his favorite character.

== Works ==
Year	Title	Role(s)	Ref.
1995	Shin Megami Tensei: Devil Summoner	Pixel art	
1996	Revelations: Persona	Art, cutscenes	
1997	Devil Summoner: Soul Hackers	Character portraits, item graphics	
1998	Kartia: The Word of Fate	Background art	
1999	Persona 2: Innocent Sin	Character portraits, background art	
2000	Persona 2: Eternal Punishment	Character portraits, background art	
2001	Shin Megami Tensei	Quality control	
2002	Shin Megami Tensei II	Supervisor	
2002	Shin Megami Tensei If...	Supervisor	
2003	Shin Megami Tensei III: Nocturne	Setting concept, event production	
2004	Stella Deus: The Gate of Eternity	Art director, character design	
2004	Haisenjyou no Aria	Illustrations (novel)	
2006	Persona 3	Art director, character design	
2007	Persona 3 FES	Art director, character design	
2007	Another Century's Episode 3: The Final	Character design	
2008	Persona: Trinity Soul	Character design	
2008	Persona 4	Art director, character design	
2009	Persona 3 Portable	Art director, character design	
2009	Momoiro Taisen Pairon	Character design	
2011	Catherine	Art director, character design	
2012	Persona 4 Golden	Art director, character design	
2012	Persona 4 Arena	Art director, character design	
2013	Persona 4 Arena Ultimax	Art director, character design	
2014	Persona Q: Shadow of the Labyrinth	Art director, character design	
2015	Persona 4: Dancing All Night	Art director, character design	
2016	Persona 5	Character design	
2018	Persona 3: Dancing in Moonlight	Character design	
2018	Persona 5: Dancing in Starlight	Character design	
2019	Catherine: Full Body	Character design	
2019	Persona 5 Royal	Character design	
2019	Sakura Wars	Character design (Hakushu Murasame)	
2020	Persona 5 Strikers	Character design	
2024	Metaphor: ReFantazio	Character design	
2025	Persona 5: The Phantom X	Protagonist design	
