= Kurusu =

Kurusu (written: 来栖) is a Japanese surname. Notable people with the surname include:

- Atsuko Kurusu (来栖 あつこ, born 1978), Japanese actress
- Ryō Kurusu (来栖 良, 1919–1945), Imperial Japanese Army officer
- Saburō Kurusu (来栖 三郎, 1886–1954), Japanese diplomat
- Takeo Kurusu (栗栖赳夫, 1895–1966), Japanese politician

== Fictional characters ==
- Akira Kurusu (来栖 暁), the protagonist in the manga adaptation of Persona 5
- Kanako Kurusu (来栖 加奈子), a character in the light novel series Oreimo
- Hana Kurusu (来栖 華), a character in the manga series Jujutsu Kaisen
