= Persona 5: The Animation =

2018 anime television series

- Volume 1 artwork, showing the lead character Ren Amamiya
- Genre: Vigilante
- Based on: Persona by Atlus
- Developed by: Shinichi Inozume
- Written by: Shinichi Inozume; Kazuho Hyodo; Noboru Kimura
- Directed by: Masashi Ishihama
- Voices of: Jun Fukuyama; Rina Satō; Mamoru Miyano; Tomokazu Sugita; Nana Mizuki; Ikue Ōtani
- Music by: Shoji Meguro
- Opening theme: "Break in to Break out" by Lyn Inaizumi
- Ending theme: "Infinity" by Lyn Inaizumi
- Country of origin: Japan
- Original language: Japanese
- No. of seasons: 1
- No. of episodes: 26 + 3 specials + 2 OVAs

Production
- Executive producer: Shu Nishimoto
- Producers: Kazuki Adachi; Ken Kawakita; Kozue Kaneniwa; Yoshikazu Tanaka (#1–27); Hirohito Shindō (#28, OVAs)
- Animator: CloverWorks (Note: The anime adaptation was originally credited to A-1 Pictures. However, the credit was transferred to CloverWorks after their separation from the studio in October 2018.)
- Running time: 24 minutes
- Production companies: Aniplex; Atlus; Sammy; Movic

Original release
- Network: Tokyo MX, GTV, GYT, BS11, MBS, AT-X
- Release: April 8, 2018 – March 23, 2019

Related
- Persona 4: The Animation

Persona 5: The Animation, stylized as PERSONA5 the Animation, is an anime television series produced by CloverWorks based on the video game Persona 5 by Atlus. The anime series is directed by Masashi Ishihama and written by Shinichi Inozume, with Tomomi Ishikawa adapting Shigenori Soejima's original character designs for the animation. Atlus employee Kazuma Kaneko created the original demon designs, while music composer Shoji Meguro reprised his role from the game. The series follows high schooler Ren Amamiya (Joker), the leader of the "Phantom Thieves of Hearts", whose mission is to reform the hearts of corrupted adults in Shibuya using a mysterious phone application called the Metaverse Navigator.

The 26-episode series aired in Japan between April and September 2018, followed by four special episodes; one aired in December 2018, a second in March 2019, and two more releases bundled with the Blu-Ray releases in May and June 2019. Additionally, an animated television special by A-1 Pictures, The Day Breakers, aired prior to the game's Japanese release in September 2016. The series is licensed by Sony's Aniplex of America in North America and Crunchyroll Store Australia in Australia.

== Plot ==
Ren Amamiya, a high school student, moves to the Shibuya district in Tokyo on probation after being falsely charged with assault while trying to stop a crime. While attending Shujin Academy and living under the care of cafe owner Sojiro Sakura, Ren discovers a mysterious smartphone app that transports him to the "Metaverse", a supernatural world formed from the distorted desires of corrupt individuals. There, he awakens to his hidden power in the form of a "Persona" and learns of the existence of "Palaces" formed by Shadows, who represent the corrupt hearts of wicked adults.

Ren is joined by other students who have also been wronged by society, and together they form the Phantom Thieves of Hearts. Their goal is to enter the Metaverse, infiltrate the Palaces, and steal the source of those individuals' distorted desires, causing them to confess their crimes in the real world. As the Phantom Thieves gain popularity, a series of mysterious incidents and crimes begin occurring across Tokyo, drawing the attention of authorities. Sae Niijima, an ambitious junior prosecutor, interrogates Ren about the Phantom Thieves and their activities.

== Voice cast ==
While most of the voice cast from the original game reprise their roles, several voice actors from the original game were replaced. In the Japanese dub, Miyu Matsuki and Kazunari Tanaka, the voice actors of Chihaya Mifune and Junya Kaneshiro respectively, died in 2015 and 2016, so they were recast by Haruka Terui and Takahiro Fujimoto. In the English dub, Shinya Oda is voiced by Eden Riegel (who also voices Hifumi Togo), rather than Barbara Goodson.

Character	Japanese	English
Ren Amamiya (Joker)	Jun Fukuyama	Xander Mobus
Morgana (Mona)	Ikue Ōtani	Cassandra Lee Morris
Ryuji Sakamoto (Skull)	Mamoru Miyano	Max Mittelman
Ann Takamaki (Panther)	Nana Mizuki	Erika Harlacher
Yusuke Kitagawa (Fox)	Tomokazu Sugita	Matthew Mercer
Makoto Niijima (Queen)	Rina Satō	Cherami Leigh
Futaba Sakura (Navi / Oracle)	Aoi Yūki	Erica Lindbeck
Haru Okumura (Noire)	Haruka Tomatsu	Xanthe Huynh
Goro Akechi (Crow)	Sōichirō Hoshi	Robbie Daymond
Sae Niijima	Yūko Kaida	Elizabeth Maxwell
Sojiro Sakura	Jouji Nakata	Jamieson Price
Tae Takemi	Yuka Saitō	Abby Trott
Munehisa Iwai	Hisao Egawa	Kaiji Tang
Yuuki Mishima	Daisuke Sakaguchi	Sean Chiplock
Sadayo Kawakami	Mai Fuchigami	Michelle Ruff
Toranosuke Yoshida	Keiichi Noda	William Salyers
Ichiko Ohya	Yumi Uchiyama	Amanda Winn Lee
Chihaya Mifune	Haruka Terui	Sarah Anne Williams
Hifumi Togo	Tomomi Isomura	Eden Riegel
Shinya Oda	Aki Kanada	Eden Riegel
Caroline and Justine / Lavenza	Aki Toyosaki	Carrie Keranen
Suguru Kamoshida	Yūji Mitsuya	D.C. Douglas
Ichiryusai Madarame	Yukitoshi Hori	Kyle Hebert
Junya Kaneshiro	Takahiro Fujimoto	Jalen K. Cassell
Wakaba Isshiki	Minako Arakawa	Erin Fitzgerald
Kunikazu Okumura	Hirohiko Kakegawa	Christopher Corey Smith
Masayoshi Shido	Shūichi Ikeda	Keith Silverstein
False Igor / Yaldabaoth	Masane Tsukayama	David Lodge
Real Igor	Isamu Tanonaka (archive recording)	Kirk Thornton

== Production ==
The anime television special The Day Breakers was announced in September 2015 during Atlus' stage event at the Tokyo Game Show. In July 2016, the title of the special was revealed as Persona 5: The Animation – The Day Breakers with Takaharu Ozaki as the director, Shinichi Inozume as writer, Toshiyuki Yahagi and Keita Matsumoto as the character designers and A-1 Pictures as the studio. It premiered on September 3, 2016, with a runtime of 24 minutes on Tokyo MX, later airing on GTV, GYT and BS11. Aniplex of America licensed the special in North America in October 2016.

The 26-episode anime television series adaptation was announced in July 2017 for a 2018 premiere, with CloverWorks animating the series. The anime series is directed by Masashi Ishihama and written by Inozume, and features adapted character and demon designs from the game by Tomomi Ishikawa and Kazuma Kaneko, respectively. The soundtrack was written by the game's original lead composer Shoji Meguro, who wrote both new material and arranged music from the game. Lyn performs the series' opening and ending themes; the opening themes are "Break In to Break Out" (episode 1–13) and "Dark Sun" (episode 14–26), while the ending themes are "Infinity" (episodes 2–13), "Found a Light" (episode 8), and "Autonomy" (episode 14–26). The series aired on Tokyo MX and other networks from April 7 to September 30, 2018. The first half of the epilogue to the series, titled Dark Sun..., aired on December 30, 2018. A second TV special, titled Stars and Ours and listed as the second half of the epilogue, was aired on March 23, 2019. Two final special episodes were announced to be included as extras with the 11th and 12th Blu-Ray/DVD volumes of the series.

Aniplex of America has also licensed the series in North America with Crunchyroll simulcasting it. Aniplex of America released the complete series on Blu-ray on September 29, 2020, including an English dub with the cast from the game reprising their roles. Despite the release of Blu-ray, the English dub was available early on August 18 as digital release exclusively on Funimation, which all 26 episodes including 2 special episodes available on that date. Anime Limited acquired the home video and digital rights to the series for the United Kingdom.

Madman Entertainment released the series in Australia and New Zealand.

== Episodes ==
No.	Title	Directed by	Original air date
0	"The Day Breakers"	Takaharu Ozaki	September 3, 2016
Lock-picking gang leader Kazuya Makigami robs restaurants with his absentminded underlings. Widely known in Shibuya for their acts of vigilantism, the Phantom Thieves of Hearts, consisting of Ren Amamiya (Joker), Morgana (Mona), Ryuji Sakamoto (Skull), Ann Takamaki (Panther) and Yusuke Kitagawa (Fox), plot to reform Kazuya without directly involving the police. Kazuya and his underlings are lured to Café Leblanc in Yongen-Jaya, but the Phantom Thieves scare off Kazuya's underlings with a security alarm. As Kazuya's Shadow is drawn to Mementos, the Prison of Sloth, represented by a twisted version of the subway station, the Phantom Thieves target him for inflicting domestic violence on his younger brother Naoya Makigami. Kazuya's Shadow transforms into the demon Mithras out of frustration, but the Phantom Thieves eventually manage to purge his arrogance after a tough battle. Before Kazuya's Shadow dissolves, he requests the Phantom Thieves to deliver his drawer key to Naoya. Back in the real world, Kazuya publicly laments the crimes committed by him and his underlings, leading to their arrest by the police. A photo of Naoya winning against Kazuya in a kendo competition is found inside the drawer.
1	"I Am Thou, Thou Art I"	Masashi Ishihama	April 8, 2018
After being captured by the riot police while trying to secure a briefcase inside a casino, Ren starts recalling the past when he is interrogated by prosecutor Sae Niijima over his actions as the leader of the Phantom Thieves of Hearts. After arriving at Shibuya by train, Ren travels to Yongen-Jaya to serve his one-year probation by staying at Café Leblanc, owned by Sojiro Sakura. Falsely accused of assault, Ren was expelled from high school a year ago. That night, Ren falls asleep when he sees a mysterious phone application called the Metaverse Navigator. Ren awakens as a prisoner inside the Velvet Room, where he briefly meets prison master Igor and twin prison wardens Caroline and Justine. The next day, Sojiro enrolls Ren at Shujin Academy, the only school that would accept him due to his criminal record. During a downpour, physical education teacher Suguru Kamoshida drives off with Ann Takamaki, one of Ren's classmates. Thanks to the Metaverse Navigator, both Ren and schoolmate Ryuji find themselves at Shujin Academy. However, it transforms into Kamoshida's Palace, the Castle of Lust, full of knights in black armor with stoic masks. Kamoshida's Shadow imprisons and tortures them, prompting Ren to awaken his Persona, Arsène.
2	"Let's Take Back What's Dear to You."	Hitomi Ezoe	April 15, 2018
Ren and Ryuji escape from Kamoshida's Palace and return to the real world, thanks to Arsène. On his first day of school, Ren is assigned by his homeroom teacher Sadayo Kawakami to sit behind Ann in class. It is shown that Igor bestowed the Metaverse Navigator to Ren in the first place. Ren later overhears that Ryuji is being blamed for causing the track team to be disbanded. During volleyball practice, Ryuji confirms a rumor that Kamoshida is abusive towards his students, like Ann's friend Shiho Suzui. Ren activates the Metaverse Navigator so he and Ryuji can reenter Kamoshida's Palace. Ren and Ryuji liberate a talking cat named Morgana from a prison cell. Upon facing Kamoshida's Shadow again, Ryuji blames Kamoshida's Shadow for ruining his reputation on the track team, thereby awakening his own Persona, Captain Kidd. Ren assists with Arsène, while Morgana assists with Zorro. The three of them retreat to the library upon seeing Ann's Cognition. Ren and Ryuji part ways with Morgana and return to the real world. At a restaurant, Ryuji learns that Ren received a one-year probation after he tried to protect a woman from a corrupt politician.
3	"A Beautiful Rose Has Thorns!"	Akihisa Shibata	April 22, 2018
During their investigation, Ren and Ryuji try to talk to Shiho about Kamoshida's abuse, but Ann abruptly takes her away from them. Later, Ann comes clean to Ren, revealing that Kamoshida is blackmailing her to keep Shiho on the volleyball team. Ren and Ryuji are told by Morgana that there is a way to reform Kamoshida, but it's risky. As a result of Kamoshida's abuse, Shiho attempts to commit suicide by jumping off the school rooftop, putting her in a coma. Ren, Ryuji, and classmate Yuuki Mishima confront Kamoshida about this, but Kamoshida threatens to expel them. With no other option left, the Metaverse Navigator is activated as Ren and Ryuji learn from Morgana that Kamoshida's Palace must be erased in order to reform Kamoshida. They secure an infiltration route to Kamoshida's Treasure. Ann inadvertently follows the others inside Kamoshida's Palace, only to be captured by Kamoshida's Shadow. Encouraged by Ren to avenge Shiho, Ann awakens her Persona Carmen. Ren, Ryuji, Morgana, and Ann force Kamoshida's Shadow to fall back. Back in the real world, the four of them plan to obtain Kamoshida's Treasure during their next mission.
4	"Steal It, if You Can"	Seiji Harada	April 29, 2018
Ren, Ryuji, Morgana, and Ann, now collectively known as the Phantom Thieves of Hearts, post their calling card on the school bulletin board, sparking attention from Kamoshida. As Kamoshida's Treasure will only be visible until morning, Ren, Ryuji, and Morgana purchase some supplies as Ann visits Shiho in the hospital. At night, Ren, Ryuji, Morgana, and Ann enter Kamoshida's Palace to steal Kamoshida's Treasure. Ren manages to recruit a patrolling demon named Pixie as a second Persona. Upon reaching Kamoshida's Treasure in the form of an ornate crown, the Phantom Thieves are confronted by Kamoshida's Shadow, who transforms into the demon Asmodeus. Ren, Morgana, and Ann fight Asmodeus and his volleyball spikes. Guided by Igor in the Velvet Room, Ren uses fusion power to combine Arsène and Pixie into a new Persona called Agathion. This allows Ryuji to steal Kamoshida's Treasure from Asmodeus's head and revert Asmodeus to Kamoshida's Shadow in defeat. Kamoshida's Palace collapses when Kamoshida's Shadow decides to repent for his actions. Back in the real world, Kamoshida publicly admits to his crimes and turns himself in. Morgana decides to room with Ren, while Ann is relieved that Shiho has woken up from her coma.
5	"The Phantoms"	Tatsuma Minamikawa	May 6, 2018
Ren, Ryuji, Morgana, and Ann enjoy an exquisite lunch buffet after pawning Kamoshida's Treasure, a gold medal. At the elevator, Ren and Ryuji unknowingly run into politician Masayoshi Shido. Ren, Ryuji, Morgana, and Ann ultimately decide to continue being the Phantom Thieves. After Mishima sets up a Phantom Aficionado Website, or Phan-site for short, so that people can send requests to the Phantom Thieves, Ann spots a request to deal with office teller Natsuhiko Nakanohara, who is a stalker. Morgana takes Ren, Ryuji, and Ann to Mementos, a Palace for the general public. They easily defeat Nakanohara's Shadow. Mementos is able to expand, thanks to the awareness of the Phantom Thieves. Revealing that he lost his memories, Morgana explains his desire to reach the bottom of Mementos in order to regain his human form. Later, Ren agrees to be a test subject for Tae Takemi, a doctor who owns the Takemi Medical Clinic. Upon returning to Café Leblanc that night, Ren meets popular teenage detective Goro Akechi.
6	"Our Next Target Is..."	Kazuki Ohashi	May 13, 2018
Yusuke Kitagawa, a sophomore in the fine arts division of Kosei High School and mentored under painter Ichiryusai Madarame, asks Ann to be the model for his next piece of artwork. Meanwhile, student council president Makoto Niijima grows suspicious about Ren, Ryuji, and Ann consistently socializing on the school rooftop. After viewing an art exhibition, Ren, Ryuji, Morgana, and Ann learn that Madarame plagiarizes artwork from his pupils, according to the Phan-site. Ren, Ryuji, Morgana, and Ann go to Madarame's rundown shack of an art studio, where Yusuke expresses only complete admiration for Madarame. Yusuke reveals that he was orphaned before being raised by Madarame, who has been his inspiration ever since. Initially assuming that they were mistaken, the Phantom Thieves activate the Metaverse Navigator, only to discover that the art studio is Madarame's Palace, the Museum of Vanity, full of female curators and security guards with heart masks. They overhear that Madarame's Shadow intends to plagiarize Yusuke's artwork. Back in the real world, Yusuke claims that he willingly allows Madarame to use his artwork. At a mall, Nakanohara confirms that he was a former art student who witnessed Madarame committing plagiarism.
7	"He Is My Other Self"	Yusuke Maruyama	May 20, 2018
Ren and Ryuji bump into a journalist named Ichiko Ohya. With Ren and Ryuji needing to alter Madarame's cognition to gain further access into Madarame's Palace, Ann distracts Yusuke by dressing in layers and slowly stripping those layers off to "prepare" to be his painting model. At the same time, Morgana unlocks a storage room just as Madarame returns to the art studio. The storage room exposes that Madarame plagiarized his most known artwork called Sayuri, which was never lost but stolen and copied to sell to wealthy buyers. As Ren and Ryuji still struggle to gain further access into Madarame's Palace, Yusuke inadvertently follows Ann and Morgana into Madarame's Palace. Madarame's Shadow admits that he only cared about the money. As Yusuke gets captured, he finally sees the truth, leading him to awaken his Persona Goemon. However, Madarame's Shadow retreats after Yusuke showcases his power. Back in the real world, Yusuke tells the others that his late mother died when he was three years old. Yusuke then agrees to officially join the Phantom Thieves.
8	"Put an End to All This and Use Your Own Artwork for Once"	Toshiki Fukushima	May 27, 2018
After posting the calling card all over the art exhibition, the Phantom Thieves secure an infiltration route to Madarame's Treasure. However, it turns out to be a decoy. Madarame's Treasure is actually the original artwork of Sayuri, painted by Yusuke's late mother, who died from a seizure. Madarame's Shadow transforms into the demon Azazel and attacks by spraying black ink. The Phantom Thieves use their Personas in order to revert Azazel to Madarame's Shadow before Yusuke defeats him. Back in the real world, Madarame publicly admits to his crimes. With the fame of the Phantom Thieves on the rise, Yusuke decides to move out of the art studio. Since Yusuke cannot move in with Ann as he wished to, Morgana suggests that Yusuke should stay at Café Leblanc instead. The Phantom Thieves celebrate with hot pot for dinner, motivated to reform more corrupted hearts after concluding that they each have their own troubled pasts. The next day, Yusuke decides to move in to the dorms, though he leaves the original artwork of Sayuri with Sojiro.
9	"Operation Maid Watch"	Hitomi Ezoe	June 3, 2018
While the Phantom Thieves wait for their next target, Morgana suggests that the others continue their academic studies as normal. Thanks to a flyer, Ren, Ryuji, and Mishima request a maid service for a vacant room. As Ryuji and Mishima chicken out at the last second, Ren discovers Kawakami moonlights as a maid named Becky. The next day, Ren saves Kawakami from being scolded by English teacher Chouno. After noticing that Ryuji is bothered by his former track teammates Nakaoka and Takeishi, Ren contacts Kawakami to meet him in his bedroom for a discussion. It is revealed that Kamoshida mocked Ryuji's mother, which provoked Ryuji to take a swing at Kamoshida, which got Ryuji kicked off of the track team. Kawakami confirms that the track team is being revived with a new track team advisor named Yamauchi, a colleague of Kamoshida. At a restaurant in Tsukishima, Ren overhears Yamauchi saying that he leaked rumors to Nakaoka and Takeishi. After school, Ryuji makes peace with Nakaoka and Takeishi, telling them to disbelieve the rumors. Later on, Kawakami informs Ren that Yamauchi will no longer be the track team advisor.
10	"I Want to See Justice with My Own Eyes"	Kazuki Ohashi	June 10, 2018
During a field trip to a television station, Ren, Ryuji, and Ann spectate a daytime talk show interviewing Akechi as the guest. Akechi claims that the Phantom Thieves should be tried in a court of law. After school, Makoto blackmails the Phantom Thieves with a recording of their identities as evidence. She states that she will delete the recording if they reform the boss of a crime syndicate targeting students. Ren and Makoto exchange contact information after they find the base of operations for the crime syndicate located in Shibuya. Ren later meets up with Ichiko at a bar in Shinjuku, where Ichiko says that the name of the boss of the crime syndicate is Junya Kaneshiro. The next day, the Metaverse Navigator leads the Phantom Thieves to Kaneshiro's Palace, the Bank of Gluttony, seen hovering over Shibuya.
11	"Let's Be Friends, Shall We?"	Akihisa Shibata	June 17, 2018
Akechi tries to ask Makoto about the Phantom Thieves, but she does not say anything. Sae, older sister and legal guardian of Makoto (following their late father's death in the line of duty as a police officer) is currently pursuing the Phantom Thieves case. Meanwhile, the Phantom Thieves find victims in the form of automated teller machines in the streets. Wanting to prove herself useful to the Phantom Thieves, Makoto willingly leads them to a club, the base of operations of the crime syndicate. However, Kaneshiro threatens to leak an incriminating photo of them in the club to the school if Makoto does not pay a debt of three million yen. Since Makoto is now considered a "customer" in Kaneshiro's Palace, the Phantom Thieves use the Metaverse Navigator to bring Makoto to Kaneshiro's Palace, full of policemen in riot gear with gas masks. As they finally gain entry to Kaneshiro's Palace, Kaneshiro's Shadow believes that Makoto is a meek little pushover. Angered by this, Makoto awakens her Persona Johanna. Since they have not secured an infiltration route to Kaneshiro's Treasure yet, Ren, Ryuji, Morgana, Ann, Yusuke, and Makoto retreat for now.
12	"I Found the Place Where I Belong"	Tatsuma Minamikawa	June 24, 2018
Makoto manages to bond more with Ren at an arcade and the Phantom Thieves eventually secure an infiltration route to Kaneshiro's Treasure and post the calling card in the streets of Shibuya. At Kaneshiro's Palace, the Phantom Thieves confront Kaneshiro's Shadow, who transforms into the demon Bael. The bank vault changes into a robot piggy bank called the Piggytron, but the Phantom Thieves manage to revert Bael to Kaneshiro's Shadow before defeating him. With Kaneshiro's Treasure unveiled as gold bars, Kaneshiro's Shadow warns the Phantom Thieves about a man using the alias Black Mask who can explore Palaces. Kaneshiro's Palace collapses, and Kaneshiro's Treasure turns out to be a golden briefcase containing counterfeit money. Ren learns from Makoto that Kaneshiro turned himself in to the police and confessed to his crimes after relieving her debt and retracting the photo threat.
13	"Dreams and Desires"	Toshiki Fukushima	July 1, 2018
While Akechi visits Café Leblanc and plays chess with Ren, they discuss the methods used by the Phantom Thieves. After school, Yusuke confides in Ren that he finds himself in an art slump. Yusuke asks Ren to be his bodyguard while he paints artwork inspired by the desire of Mementos, but Yusuke only receives harsh criticism from an art dealer named Akio Kawanabe. Although Kawanabe offers to invest in Yusuke as a young artist, Yusuke declines the offer. At a batting cage, Akechi informs Ren that Kawanabe may be into some shady practices, though there first needs to be actual evidence of this. Yusuke eventually manages to get out of his art slump thanks to some encouragement and support from Ren. Moreover, Ren discovers that Kawanabe's subordinate was committing the crimes, allowing Akechi to arrest the subordinate. After Yusuke makes a painting inspired by the dreams and desires of Mementos, Kawanabe praises Yusuke for his artwork. Kawanabe reveals that he was close with Madarame before they had a falling-out. Yusuke still declines Kawanabe's offer in order to pursue his own fame.
14	"What Life Do You Choose?"	Yoshifumi Sasahara	July 8, 2018
While looking around Shinjuku with Ren, Makoto spots a fellow student named Eiko Takao working at an after-school salon. Makoto and Eiko hit it off as friends since they have a similar taste in a pencil case shaped like a panda. Mishima encounters Ichiko at a bar. Makoto calls Ren in for a favor by meeting up for a double date with Eiko and her host boyfriend, Tsukasa. Worried about Eiko being scammed by Tsukasa, Makoto tells Ren that her late father was a police officer, and that she wishes to follow in his footsteps to help people like Eiko. Ren and Makoto expose Tsukasa for being a scammer, though Eiko is too stubborn to believe this. Since the Phan-site reported multiple women being scammed by Tsukasa, the Phantom Thieves defeat Tsukasa's Shadow in Mementos. Afterward, Ren learns that Eiko apologized to Makoto and that they will remain friends.
15	"I Am Alibaba"	Tomohisa Taguchi	July 15, 2018
After the term finals, the Phantom Thieves watch a fireworks show, though their enjoyment is cut short when it begins to rain. As a mysterious international group of hackers known as Medjed issues a public warning to the Phantom Thieves, Ren is contacted by someone using the alias Alibaba, who threatens to reveal the identities of the Phantom Thieves unless they can reform a hacker named Futaba Sakura. When Ren asks to meet Alibaba in person, Alibaba suddenly calls off the request and asks the Phantom Thieves not to look into Futaba any further. The Phantom Thieves soon realize that Futaba may be related to Sojiro due to their shared last name. Meanwhile, Sae threatens to get Sojiro's custody of Futaba revoked. After causing a temporary citywide blackout, Medjed plans to attack Japan unless the Phantom Thieves reveal their identities. The Phantom Thieves then ascertain that Alibaba is actually Futaba in disguise. At night, the Phantom Thieves sneak into Sojiro's house and come face-to-face with Futaba.
16	"This Place Is My Grave"	Hitomi Ezoe	July 22, 2018
After the Phantom Thieves are caught sneaking around Sojiro's house, Sojiro explains that Futaba witnessed a traumatic event when her biological mother Wakaba Isshiki committed suicide two years ago, resulting in Futaba becoming a shut-in a few months ago after developing severe agoraphobia and suffering from auditory hallucinations. Although Sojiro believes that Futaba needs to be left alone, the Phantom Thieves later decide to reform Futaba after discovering that she may have a Palace. As summer vacation begins, the Phantom Thieves contacts Futaba, who views her bedroom as a tomb where she will die. Using the Metaverse Navigator, the Phantom Thieves enter Futaba's Palace, the Pyramid of Wrath. They encounter Futaba's Shadow, who hears voices blaming her for Wakaba's death. After discussing a plan of action, the Phantom Thieves become aware of Futaba's deteriorating mental state from losing Wakaba. When they are blocked from reaching Futaba's Treasure behind a barricaded bedroom door, the Phantom Thieves eventually persuade Futaba to invite them inside her bedroom, where she opens up and directly asks them to reform her.
17	"X Day"	Kazuki Ohashi	July 29, 2018
After sending a calling card to Futaba, the Phantom Thieves gain access to the core of Futaba's Palace, but they are confronted by Wakaba's Cognition in the form of the demon Sphinx. When Futaba manages to enter her own Palace by using the Metaverse Navigator, her Shadow encourages Futaba to remember that Wakaba always loved her, leading Futaba to realize that Wakaba's suicide note was fabricated by some male researchers who stole Wakaba's cognitive psience research. As a result, Futaba awakens her Persona Necronomicon, assisting the others in defeating Wakaba's Cognition. After Futaba leaves the Palace, the others realize that Futaba's Treasure was herself all along, causing Futaba's Palace to collapse. Back in the real world, Sojiro realizes that Futaba needs to rest for a few days after she depleted her stamina. Ren, Ryuji, Morgana, Ann, Yusuke and Makoto visit Tokyo Skytree. Later on, Futaba puts a stop to Medjed with her hacking abilities as promised. Futaba reveals to the others that she was the founder of Medjed, but the group of hackers started using that alias to commit cybercrimes. After having sushi at a restaurant, Futaba asks Ren to help her find out who actually murdered Wakaba.
18	"I'll Guide You to Victory"	Akihisa Shibata	August 5, 2018
As Futaba agrees to become a member of the Phantom Thieves, the others offer to improve her social skills by planning to take her to the beach. After Sojiro teaches Ren how to cook curry and rice, Ann and Makoto purchase a swimsuit for Futaba to wear at the beach. The Phantom Thieves have some fun in the sun. At sunset, Futaba tells the others about Wakaba's cognitive psience research, which is tied to Palaces and connected to cases of mental shutdowns and psychotic breaks. The next day, Ren and Ryuji run into Kawakami at a fishing pond in Ichigaya, and Ren and Ryuji meet up with Futaba at a store in Akihabara to help her buy a game. The Phantom Thieves visit Mementos, which has expanded due to their increasing cognition. Ann reveals she is not fully invested in her modeling gig, which is noticed by a fellow model named Mika. When Ren returns to Café Leblanc, Sojiro tells him that Wakaba suspiciously predicted her death. Sojiro gives Futaba some sparklers to light up outside. Upon questioning his humanity, Morgana is reassured by Ren that he is not a cat.
19	"Aloha"	Harume Kosaka	August 12, 2018
The school starts a new term. Without any leads on who murdered Wakaba, Makoto goes on a mission to extract data from Sae's laptop using Futaba's thumb drive. Ren, Ryuji, Ann, and Makoto go on a school trip to Hawaii, where they enjoy food from a burger joint called Big Bang Burger. Yusuke meets up with the four after his school trip to Los Angeles was canceled due to a storm. Ren comes to the aid of Hifumi Togo, a professional shogi player and Yusuke's classmate. A scene shows Kobayakawa, the principal of Shujin Academy, suffering a mental shutdown at a crosswalk and being killed by an oncoming truck. While Ren brings souvenirs for Sojiro, Futaba, and Morgana, Makoto learns from Sae that Kobayakawa committed suicide. The extracted data leads the Phantom Thieves to investigate Kunikazu Okumura, the CEO of Okumura Foods, which owns Big Bang Burger. Kunikazu allegedly stood to profit from people who died from mental shutdowns. Morgana decides to go rogue when the Phantom Thieves become divided upon learning about Kunikazu's Palace. Sae tells Akechi that she will take down the Phantom Thieves.
20	"My Name Is Beauty Thief!"	Tomohisa Taguchi	August 19, 2018
Ren, Ryuji, Ann, Yusuke, Makoto, and Futaba approach Okumura Foods and use the Metaverse Navigator to enter Kunikazu's Palace, the Spaceport of Greed, full of robots with angular masks. After they are unable to breach the authentication of Kunikazu's Palace, they discover that Morgana has allied himself with a girl using the alias Beauty Thief. Back in the real world, Beauty Thief is identified as Kunikazu's daughter Haru Okumura, who explains that she allied herself with Morgana in order to find out the truth behind Kunikazu. After talking with Ichiko at the bar about Kunikazu, Ren briefly encounters a fortune-teller named Chihaya Mifune in the streets, attempting to sell him a Holy Stone. At Mementos, Morgana defiantly chooses to defect from the others and stay with Haru. In the streets, Morgana gets injured while trying to protect Haru from her abusive fiancé named Sugimura. As the others come to the rescue, Morgana admits he wants to stay with the Phantom Thieves. Haru decides that she wants to call off her engagement with Sugimura.
21	"You Can Call Me "Noir""	Yorifusa Yamaguchi	August 26, 2018
Haru officially joins the Phantom Thieves as they plan to reform Kunikazu. Returning to Kunikazu's Palace, they encounter Sugimura's Cognition in the form of a large robot called a Corporobo. No longer choosing to be subservient to her father, Haru manages to awaken her Persona Milady and defeat Sugimura's Cognition. The Phantom Thieves secure an infiltration route to Kunikazu's Treasure, which is later revealed to be a mysterious orb, and they send a calling card to Kunikazu in the real world. They confront Kunikazu's Shadow, who transforms into the demon Mammon, and they defeat his army of Corporobo Employees with increasing strength, including four workers, two chief clerks, two assistant managers, two division managers, one general manager, and one executive director. Before Kunikazu's Palace collapses, Kunikazu's Shadow admits that he requested the elimination of his competitors. As the Phantom Thieves leave, Kunikazu's Shadow is shot to death by an unseen figure. Back in the real world, the Phantom Thieves visit a theme park that they get to enjoy all to themselves due to Haru's family connections and money, and they learn that Kunikazu's Treasure is a model spaceship kit. They are shocked when Kunikazu suddenly dies after suffering from a mental shutdown during a press conference.
22	"Is It Our Fault...?"	Hitomi Ezoe	September 2, 2018
As public opinion of the Phantom Thieves of Hearts plummets following Kunikazu's death by supposed cardiac arrest, Haru informs the others that a fake calling card was placed in Kobayakawa's office, leading the Phantom Thieves to realize that someone is trying to frame them. As Makoto learns that Sae is tasked with investigating the Phantom Thieves, Futaba deduces that someone imitated Medjed and hacked the Phan-site to use the Phantom Thieves as a scapegoat. At an arcade, Ren witnesses Mishima obsessing over the Phan-site. Ren then plays shogi with Hifumi in a church as the latter opens up about living up to her mother's expectations. After the midterm exams, Ren, Ann, and Shiho venture to the school roof, where Shiho thanks Ann for saving her life. Upon discovering that Mishima tried to post a threatening message against the naysayers on the Phan-site, the Phantom Thieves find Mishima's Shadow while visiting Mementos. Instead of defeating Mishima's Shadow, they urge him to think things through for himself. Back in the real world, Mishima confides in Ren that he found the right path in supporting the Phan-site.
23	"How About a Deal with Me?"	Kazuki Ohashi	September 9, 2018
The students of Shujin Academy unanimously vote for Akechi to appear as a guest speaker at the upcoming festival. Despite the clear and present danger, Makoto tells the others that she wants to follow through with it to gain more information. While playing chess at Café Leblanc again, Ren concludes that Akechi may be a fan of the Phantom Thieves. On the daytime talk show, Akechi states his belief that the Phantom Thieves were not the culprits behind Kunikazu's death. The Phantom Thieves enjoy the different booths during the school festival, and later in the school auditorium Akechi reveals that he knows the identities of the Phantom Thieves. While in the physical education faculty office, Akechi shows the Phantom Thieves some footage of them outside Okumura Foods before explaining that he awakened his own Persona while facing down Black Mask. Akechi blackmails the Phantom Thieves with a bounty on their heads. Offering to clear their names, he wants them to reform Sae after discovering that she may have a Palace, though they must agree on the condition that they disband after the mission is over.
24	"A Challenge That Must Be Won"	Harume Kosaka	September 16, 2018
Akechi joins the Phantom Thieves as they all arrive at a courthouse, where they use the Metaverse Navigator to enter Sae's Palace, the Casino of Envy, full of bouncers with melted masks. They encounter Sae's Shadow, who states that Sae's Treasure is located on the top floor, which is inaccessible to the Phantom Thieves. During this mission, Akechi reveals his Persona Robin Hood. Back in the real world, Sojiro is under pressure from Futaba's abusive uncle named Youji Isshiki, who has been demanding that Sojiro pay child support or give up custody of Futaba. Akechi digs up dirt on Youji, who lost most of the previous child support payments on bad investments. Even though he slips and falls during a confrontation with Sojiro and Ren, Youji threatens to sue Ren for pushing him. When Youji instead call social workers on Sojiro, Futaba reassures the social workers that Sojiro is a good legal guardian. After discovering a calling card in Futaba's bedroom, Sojiro deduces that Futaba is in contact with the Phantom Thieves. In Sae's Palace, the Phantom Thieves win enough coins at the Dice Game Area in order to acquire a member's card, thanks to Futaba.
25	"Jealous Sinner"	Tomohisa Taguchi; Yusuke Maruyama	September 23, 2018
After gaining access to the high-rate floor by passing the House of Darkness, the Phantom Thieves are unable to cross the Bridge of Judgment on the top floor due to an insufficient amount of coins. Ren manages to obtain enough coins in the Battle Arena. When Sae's Shadow raises the fee tenfold, Akechi reveals he took advantage of a loophole in the member's card policy by using a second member's card to take out a loan that matches their winnings, thus acquiring enough coins for the Phantom Thieves to cross the Bridge of Judgment. Once the Phantom Thieves secure an infiltration route to Sae's Treasure, they send the calling card to Sae one day before she finishes her investigation. When Sae's Shadow transforms into the demon Leviathan, the Phantom Thieves eventually defeat her, and Sae's Treasure is revealed to be a police notebook, presumably belonging to her late father. Unfortunately, the riot police prepare to raid Sae's Palace due to an anonymous tip, prompting the Phantom Thieves to split up and find their way out.
26	"I Won't Let It End Here"	Masashi Ishihama	September 30, 2018
Ren is reunited with Arsène, who urges him to remember everything. He ends up being captured by the riot police, which is reported on the news. An independent politician with a losing streak named Toranosuke Yoshida believes that the Phantom Thieves are innocent. Telling the others that Ren is being held in an underground interrogation room at a youth detention center, Akechi believes that Black Mask may have given the anonymous tip. Akechi plans to rescue Ren on his own. In the present day, the interrogation draws to a close. As he remembers an earlier discussion with Morgana and Futaba, Ren asks Sae to show his smartphone to Akechi. As Akechi arrives at the youth detention center, Sae shows Ren's smartphone to him as requested, asking if he knows anything about it, to which he responds he doesn't. The other members of the Phantom Thieves patiently wait and have faith. As he enters the interrogation room, Akechi shows his true intentions by shooting Ren in the head with a silencer equipped gun before taking his leave.
27 (SP–1)	"Dark Sun..."	Kazuki Ohashi; Hitomi Ezoe	December 30, 2018
As the news reports that Ren allegedly committed suicide, Sae hides a still-living Ren at Café Leblanc. Ren is reunited with Ryuji, Morgana, Ann, Yusuke, Makoto, Futaba, and Haru. The Phantom Thieves reveal they took advantage of Sae's cognitive world, which had an interrogation room identical to the one in the real world. Akechi's treachery was known prior to defeating Sae's Shadow, so before Ren was captured, he switched a suitcase containing Sae's Treasure with an empty suitcase to prevent Sae's Palace from collapsing. Ren's death was staged when Akechi looked at Ren's smartphone, which activated Sae's cognitive world. Futaba previously bugged Akechi's smartphone, finding out that Akechi was the culprit behind the mental shutdown cases. Akechi works for Shido, the mastermind behind everything, who is running a political campaign to become the next prime minister of Japan. Ren finally recognizes Shido as the man who falsely accused him and led to his criminal record. Approaching the National Diet Building, the Phantom Thieves use the Metaverse Navigator to enter Shido's Palace, the Cruiser of Pride, which is full of guards wearing suits and party masks. As they steadily progress further in Shido's Palace, they learn that Shido stood to profit from people who died from mental shutdowns. Upon realizing that the Phantom Thieves deceived him, Akechi confronts them and reveals that Shido is his father. Akechi changes his Persona from Robin Hood to Loki before transforming into Black Mask, expressing envy against Ren during a brief duel. Akechi's Cognition appears with a special assault team and hounds to inform him that Shido has won the election and thus Akechi is no longer needed. Akechi shoots his Cognition, then forcefully closes a watertight bulkhead door behind him, sacrificing himself so the Phantom Thieves can reform Shido. The Phantom Thieves secure an infiltration route to Shido's Treasure, sending a calling card to Shido by publicly displaying it on the city monitors. They finally confront Shido's Shadow, who transforms into the demon Samael. After a long battle, Shido's Shadow is defeated, and Shido's Treasure is revealed to be a golden ship's wheel. As Shido's Palace starts to collapse, the Phantom Thieves escape to the real world after Ryuji seemingly sacrifices himself to obtain a lifeboat for the others. In reality, Shido's Treasure is revealed to be a legislator's pin, Ryuji is shown to have survived the blast no worse for wear, and Shido publicly admits to his crimes.
28 (SP–2)	"Stars and Ours"	Masashi Ishihama	March 23, 2019
With Shido hospitalized and his inauguration postponed until further notice, the public opinion of the Phantom Thieves begins to wane. Morgana explains that the Phantom Thieves must infiltrate Mementos and steal Mementos's Treasure, which will reform all of society. However, this will erase the Metaverse and permanently disband the Phantom Thieves. Upon entering the Depths of Mementos, the Phantom Thieves discover that Mementos's Treasure is the Holy Grail, seen as a sentient being that seeks to subjugate society's cognition. The Holy Grail fuses Mementos with reality, erasing the Phantom Thieves from existence. Ren awakens in the Velvet Room, where he is freed from his cell before merging Caroline and Justine into one body as Lavenza, her proper appearance. However, a false Igor reveals himself as the Holy Grail in disguise and leaves to conquer reality, while the real Igor is released from imprisonment. Ren then frees the other members of the Phantom Thieves from their cells, and they vow to save all of society by defeating the Holy Grail. Morgana remembers that he was created to dispel an evil being from the human spiritual world, while Lavenza explains that the Holy Grail is the fusion of society's desire of sloth. With their existence gradually resurfacing, the Phantom Thieves enter the Depths of Mementos again and confront the Holy Grail, who transforms into Yaldabaoth, a malevolent god. Thanks to their Confidants, the Phantom Thieves regain full support from society. Ren awakens a powerful Persona called Satanael, defeating Yaldabaoth with a single shot to the head. Morgana obtains Mementos's Treasure and dissipates into the sky. With society's cognition restored and the Metaverse erased, it begins snowing in the city. In order to protect the lives of his comrades and make sure Shido is convicted, Ren agrees to testify in court, admitting that he was the leader of the Phantom Thieves and surrendering himself to the police. As a result, he is incarcerated in the juvenile detention center. Igor and Lavenza note that they have completed their duties in rehabilitating Ren in the Velvet Room. Months later, Ren is released from the juvenile detention center, and Morgana is revealed to be still alive. At the end of his probation year, Ren is driven back to his hometown by the others.
OVA–1	"Proof of Justice"	Yorifusa Yamaguchi	May 29, 2019
Three days after Shido was reformed, Ren discovers that Akechi previously wrote "Proof of Justice" in a crossword puzzle book. Ren later investigates their hangout spots, including a billiard hall and a jazz club, while reminiscing when Akechi confided that he was good at billiards but bad at cooking. After some digging around, Ren discovers that Proof of Justice is the name of a popular toy raygun, recalling a memory of Akechi saying he desired to be an ally of justice. Upon returning to Café Leblanc at night, Ren reevaluates his proof of justice. This next morning, the news reports that Shido has been hospitalized due to an emergency, causing an alarmed Ren to run off and investigate.
OVA–2	"A Magical Valentine's Day"	Kazuki Ohashi	June 26, 2019
On Valentine's Day, scenarios depicted in first-person perspective are featured with Ren individually spending time with his love interests, including Ann at a theme park, Futaba at an ice rink, Chihaya at a shrine, Hifumi at a swimming pool, Kawakami in his bedroom, Haru at a greenhouse, Tae in her office, Makoto at a love lock bridge and Ichiko at a horse racing track. Each love interest gifts Ren with chocolates, tells him about their future plans, asks if he is going back to his hometown next month, proclaims that he is their boyfriend, and shares a kiss with him. During the final scenario, Ren hangs out with Ryuji at Café Leblanc overnight. The next day, all of Ren's love interests, under the impression that he was cheating on them, barge into Café Leblanc and gang up beat him in retaliation before taking their leave. The post-credits scene features an additional scenario where Ren spends time with Sae at an opera performance.

== Reception ==
Joe Ballard from CBR praised the anime for the portrayal of the characters that stays true to the original game. However, he criticized the pacing as it doesn't allow the time for those character developments to truly affect the audience. He also criticized how most of the female characters are subjected to excess fan service moments. He finds the shots from purposely sexualized camera angles are unnecessary and demeaning, stating that "it feels like a slap in the face to their personal struggles, especially considering one of the palace storylines revolves around physical and sexual abuse and the resulting mental health struggles." Megan Gudman from the same site praised the anime for bringing back Lyn and Shoji Meguro's music and the expansion of Ren and Akechi's relationship, but criticized the dull animation and its poor handling of the Confidant characters. USGamer criticized Joker's relatively silent personality in the anime adaptation, negatively comparing him to the more talkative Yu Narukami in Persona 4: The Animation.

== See also ==
- Persona 5 (manga)
