= Xander Mobus =

American voice actor

- Mobus at GalaxyCon Des Moines in 2026
- Born: Denton County, Texas, U.S.
- Occupation: Voice actor
- Years active: 2008–present

Xander Mobus is an American voice actor. He is primarily known for his work in English-anime dubs and video games.

== Career ==
In 2014, Mobus voiced the announcer and the characters Master Hand and Crazy Hand in Super Smash Bros. for Nintendo 3DS and Wii U and returned for the role in 2018's Super Smash Bros. Ultimate. He also voices Christo in Disgaea 5: Alliance of Vengeance, Dagda in Shin Megami Tensei IV: Apocalypse, the Conductor in A Hat in Time, and Joker in Persona 5. He voice acted various comedic requests through social media during this period, such as singing the "Pokémon Theme" in the Super Smash Bros. announcer's voice.

== Filmography ==
=== Anime ===
List of voice performances in anime
| Year | Title | Role | Notes | Source |
|---|---|---|---|---|
| 2016 | Mob Psycho 100 | Yusuke Sakurai | | |
| 2016 | March Comes in like a Lion | Takeshi Tsujii | | |
| 2016 | Erased | Kenya Kobayashi (adult) | | |
| 2017 | Naruto: Shippuden | Madara Uchiha (young) | | |
| 2017 | B The Beginning | Laica | Netflix dub | |
| 2017 | Blue Exorcist: Kyoto Saga | Juzo Shima | | |
| 2017–2019 | Hunter × Hunter | Bean, Welfin | 2011 series | |
| 2017 | Tales of Zestiria the X | Sergei Strelka | | |
| 2018 | JoJo's Bizarre Adventure: Stardust Crusaders | Terence T. D'Arby | | |
| 2018 | Katsugeki/Touken Ranbu | Tonbokiri | | |
| 2018 | Sword Gai | Kazumo, Mizuhara | Netflix dub | |
| 2018 | Hero Mask | Theo | Netflix dub | |
| 2018 | Sirius the Jaeger | Fallon | Netflix dub | |
| 2018 | Beyblade Burst | Hae-jin Oh | Turbo | |
| 2019–present | Boruto: Naruto Next Generations | Momoshiki Otsutsuki | | |
| 2019 | The Rising of the Shield Hero | Motoyasu Kitamura | | |
| 2019 | Cells at Work! | Neutrophil Teacher | | |
| 2019 | Fate/Grand Order - Absolute Demonic Front: Babylonia | Romani Archaman | | |
| 2019 | Demon Slayer: Kimetsu no Yaiba | Yahaba | | |
| 2020 | Marvel Future Avengers | Adi / Codec | | |
| 2020 | Ascendance of a Bookworm | Benno | | |
| 2020 | Pokémon Journeys: The Series | Wyndon Stadium announcer, Walker | | |
| 2020 | Tower of God | Quant Blitz | | |
| 2020 | Case Closed Episode One: The Great Detective Turned Small | Kogoro Mori | | |
| 2020 | Persona 5: The Animation | Ren Amamiya | | |
| 2020 | The God of High School | Commissioner Q | | |
| 2020 | Jujutsu Kaisen | Toge Inumaki, Aoi Todo, Juzo Kumiya | | |
| 2020 | Sword Art Online: Alicization | Vassago Casals / PoH | | |
| 2021 | Yashahime: Princess Half-Demon | Kinka | | |
| 2021 | Kuroko's Basketball | Taisuke Ōtsubo, Masahiro Tsubuku | | |
| 2021 | Suppose a Kid from the Last Dungeon Boonies Moved to a Starter Town | Coba | | |
| 2021 | So I'm a Spider, So What? | Hugo Baint von Renxandt | | |
| 2022 | Odd Taxi | Fuyuki Yamamoto | | |
| 2022 | The Prince of Tennis | Yudai Yamoto | | |
| 2022 | Spriggan | Jean Jacquemonde | | |
| 2022–present | Bleach: Thousand-Year Blood War | Bazz-B, Quilge Opie, Taketsuna Gon, Pernida Parnkgjas | | |
| 2023 | Digimon Adventure | Argomon, ShogunGekomon, Olegmon, SkullKnightmon/AxeKnightmon, Minotarumon, Golemon | | |
| 2023 | Zom 100: Bucket List of the Dead | Kenichiro Ryuzaki | Netflix dub | |
| 2023 | Bastard!! Heavy Metal, Dark Fantasy | Ross Zaboss Friedrich, Mercy | | |
| 2025 | Sakamoto Days | Tatsu | Netflix dub | |
| 2026 | Akane-banashi | Shinta Arakawa | | |
| 2026 | The Elusive Samurai | Nezu Yorinao | | |

=== Films ===
List of voice performances in films
| Year | Title | Role | Notes | Source |
|---|---|---|---|---|
| 2017 | Fate/Grand Order: First Order | Romani Archaman | | |
| 2017 | Boruto: Naruto the Movie | Momoshiki Otsusuki | | |
| 2019 | Bungo Stray Dogs: Dead Apple | Tatsuhiko Shibusawa | | |
| 2019 | Case Closed: Zero the Enforcer | Kogoro Mori | | |
| 2019 | Case Closed: The Crimson Love Letter | Kogoro Mori | | |
| 2021 | Sherlock Holmes and the Great Escape | Dr. M, Telephone Salesman | | |
| 2021 | Case Closed: The Fist of Blue Sapphire | Kogoro Mori | | |
| 2022 | Jujutsu Kaisen 0 | Toge Inumaki, Aoi Todo | | |
| 2022 | The Deer King | Shikan | | |

=== Animation ===
List of voice performances in animation
| Year | Title | Role | Notes | Source |
|---|---|---|---|---|
| 2016 | Camp WWE | The Ultimate Warrior | | |
| 2018 | Turning Mecard | Evan | Studiopolis English dub | |
| 2018 | The Predator Holiday Special | Sprinkles | | |
| 2019 | Hazbin Hotel | Additional voices | | Pilot: "That's Entertainment" |
| 2019 | YooHoo to the Rescue | RingRing | | |

=== Web series ===
List of voice performances in web series
| Year | Title | Role | Notes | Source |
|---|---|---|---|---|
| 2013–present | Death Battle | Lion-O, Robocop, Wolverine, Agumon, Guts, Superman | | |
| 2015-2027 | Five Nights at Freddy's: The Musical | Freddy Fazbear | Also the Puppeteer for the Freddy Puppet | |
| 2015–19 | Final Fantasy VII: Machinabridged | Rufus Shinra | A TeamFourStar abridged series | |
| 2017–18 | Dragon Ball Z Abridged | Jimmy Firecracker | A TeamFourStar abridged series | |
| 2023–present | 5 Years Later | Cooper Daniels, Armodrillo, Atomix, Diamondhead, Four Arms, Magister Labrid, Rath, Soap Reef, Sucker Punch, Professor Paradox, Vilgax | Also voice director | |

=== Video games ===
List of voice performances in video games
| Year | Title | Role | Notes | Source |
|---|---|---|---|---|
| 2014 | Super Smash Bros. for Nintendo 3DS and Wii U | Announcer, Master Hand, Crazy Hand | Known as Dairantō Smash Bros. for Nintendo 3DS and Wii U in Japan | |
| 2015 | Tales of Zestiria | Sergei Strelka | | |
| 2015 | Disgaea 5: Alliance of Vengeance | Christo | | |
| 2016 | Megadimension Neptunia VII | Umio | | |
| 2016 | Raiden V | Richard Maxwell | Uncredited role, also in the 2017 rerelease Raiden V: Director's Cut | |
| 2016 | Shin Megami Tensei IV: Apocalypse | Dagda | | |
2017
| 2017 | Persona 5 | Joker and Arsène | | |
| 2017 | Puyo Puyo Tetris | Dark Prince | | |
| 2017 | Street Fighter V | Abigail | Also in the expanded Arcade Edition and Champion Edition | |
| 2017 | Fire Emblem Heroes | Innes, Arvis, Kaze | | |
| 2017 | Fire Emblem Warriors | Darios | | |
| 2017 | A Hat in Time | The Conductor | | |
| 2018 | Monster Hunter World | Second Fleet Master | | |
| 2018 | Radiant Historia | Stocke | 3DS remake | |
| 2018 | Shining Resonance Refrain | Lestin Serra Alma | | |
| 2018 | Detective Pikachu | Roger Clifford | | |
| 2018 | 2MD: VR Football | Announcer | | |
| 2018 | Valkyria Chronicles 4 | Ryan Ford | | |
| 2018 | Soulcalibur VI | Grøh | | |
| 2018 | Persona 5: Dancing in Starlight | Ren Amamiya | | |
| 2018 | Super Smash Bros. Ultimate | Announcer, Master Hand, Crazy Hand, Joker | Known as Dairantō Smash Bros. Special in Japan | |
| 2019 | Smite | King Arthur | | |
| 2019 | Catherine: Full Body | Paul Miller, Joker | | |
| 2019 | Daemon X Machina | Crow | | |
| 2019 | Shantae and the Seven Sirens | Uncle Mimic, Mayor of Arena Town | | |
| 2019 | The Legend of Heroes: Trails of Cold Steel III | Michael Irving | Known as Eiyū Densetsu: Sen no Kiseki III in Japan | |
| 2019 | League of Legends | Sett | | |
| 2020 | Vitamin Connection | Mr. Sable | | |
| 2020 | Fallout 76: Wastelanders | Glenn the Arena Guard, Smiley, System Voice, Settlers | | |
| 2020 | Persona 5 Royal | Joker and Arsène | | |
| 2020 | Marble Knights | Qball | | |
| 2020 | The Legend of Heroes: Trails of Cold Steel IV | Michael Irving | Known as Eiyū Densetsu: Sen no Kiseki IV in Japan | |
| 2020 | Monster Prom 2: Monster Camp | Mr. Pappas, Lucien, Jarrod | | |
| 2020 | Fallout 76: Steel Dawn | Barry, Marty Putnam, Settlers | | |
| 2020 | Yakuza: Like a Dragon | Additional voices | | |
| 2020 | Pokémon Masters EX | Steven Stone | | |
| 2021 | Persona 5 Strikers | Joker | | |
| 2021 | Dragalia Lost | Joker, Arsène | | |
| 2021 | Story of Seasons: Pioneers of Olive Town | Additional voices | | |
| 2021 | Monster Hunter Rise | Character Voice 1 | | |
| 2021 | Neo: The World Ends with You | Tanzo Kubo | | |
| 2021 | Lost Judgment | Yuma Suou | | |
| 2021 | Demon Slayer: Kimetsu no Yaiba – The Hinokami Chronicles | Yahaba | | |
| 2021 | Cookie Run: Kingdom | Sparkling Cookie | | |
| 2022 | Omega Strikers | Rune | | |
| 2022 | RIver City Girls 2 | Berserker, Sonokawa | | |
| 2023 | Trinity Trigger | Cyan Elreius | | |
| 2023 | The Legend of Heroes: Trails into Reverie | Ordine | | |
| 2023 | Fortnite: Battle Royale | Rift Warden Stellan | | |
| 2023 | Persona 5 Tactica | Joker | | |
| 2023 | Like a Dragon Gaiden: The Man Who Erased His Name | Kubota | | |
| 2024 | Like a Dragon: Infinite Wealth | Additional voices | | |
| 2024 | Persona 3 Reload | Mr. Edogawa, Joker | | |
| 2024 | Unicorn Overlord | Govil | | |
| 2024 | Puyo Puyo Puzzle Pop | Dark Prince | | |
| 2024 | Romancing SaGa 2: Revenge of the Seven | Kzinssie | | |
| 2024 | Demon Slayer -Kimetsu no Yaiba- Sweep the Board! | Yahaba | | |
| 2025 | Like a Dragon: Pirate Yakuza in Hawaii | Additional voices | | |
| 2025 | Yakuza 0 Director's Cut | Additional voices | | |
| 2025 | Granblue Fantasy Versus: Rising | Wilnas | | |
| 2025 | Story of Seasons: Grand Bazaar | Garon | | |
| 2025 | Pac-Man World 2 Re-Pac | Wormwood | | |
| 2025 | Digimon Story: Time Stranger | Additional voices | | |
| 2026 | Fire Emblem: Fortune's Weave | Dietrich | | |
| 2026 | 2XKO | Sett | | |
