= Erika Harlacher =

American voice actress (born 1990)

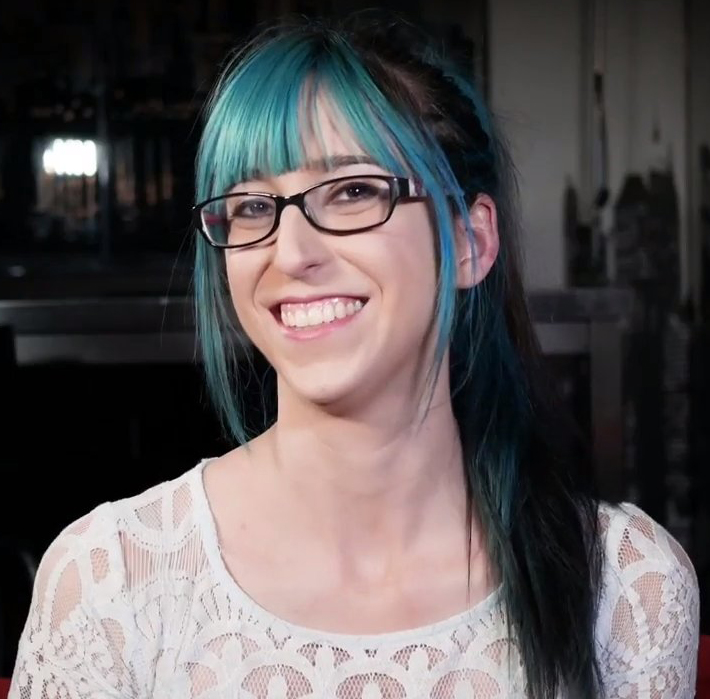
- Harlacher in 2018
- Born: Erika Lynn Harlacher; August 29, 1990 (age 36); Camarillo, California, U.S.
- Education: California State Polytechnic University, Pomona
- Occupations: Voice actress, Singer, songwriter
- Years active: 2011–present
- Spouse: Luke Stone (m. 2020)
- Website: www.erikalynnharlacher.com

Erika Lynn Harlacher-Stone (/ˈhɑːrlɑːkər/ HAR-lahk-ər; born August 29, 1990) is an American voice actress who has provided voices for English dubbed Japanese anime shows and video games. Some of her major roles in anime include: Ami Kawashima in Toradora!, Mimori Togo in Yuki Yuna is a Hero, Asseylum Vers Allusia in Aldnoah.Zero, Elizabeth Liones in The Seven Deadly Sins, Shinobu Kocho in Demon Slayer: Kimetsu no Yaiba, Kurapika in Hunter × Hunter, Violet in Violet Evergarden, and Yumeko Jabami in Kakegurui – Compulsive Gambler. In video games, she provides the voice of Kyoko Kirigiri and Kaede Akamatsu in the Danganronpa video game series, Ann Takamaki in Persona 5, Venti and Istaroth in Genshin Impact, Juna Crawford in The Legend of Heroes: Trails of Cold Steel III and IV, Ayesha in Atelier Ayesha: The Alchemist of Dusk, and Raging Bull in Ys IX: Monstrum Nox, Secret of Mana, Final Fantasy VII Remake.

== Biography ==
Harlacher grew up in Camarillo, California, and started acting in school plays. When she was around 9–10 years old, she was inspired by an interview by Christy Carlson Romano, who voiced the title character from Kim Possible, in which Romano said that with voice acting, you could go to work in your pajamas. Erika's mother responded that it was not a real job, and suggested Erika pursue acting only as a hobby. Her first exposure to anime was through Dragon Ball Z and Pokémon, which she considered more like cartoons, and then became more interested in manga and anime in school when Fruits Basket was being published in English. At La Reina High School, she was active in the Speech and Mock Trial team, winning the California state championship in 2008. She also competed on the school's diving team.

After graduating high school in 2008, she attended California State Polytechnic University, Pomona where she intended to major in graphic design. During her freshman year, she looked up some online forums on voice-over acting and attended Anime Expo, where she attended an Adventures in Voice Acting workshop conducted by Tony Oliver. On Oliver's suggestion that she was pretty good at it, she changed her major to theatre, and continued to take voice acting lessons and workshops while studying at school. She also did a production internship at Bang Zoom! Entertainment where she got to sit in on some of the recording sessions. Her first voice acting project was on K-On!, where she voiced Keiko Ida, among some other incidental characters. Her first big voice-over role was for the Battleship video game, based on the 2012 movie of the same name, where she got to voice the main character, Grace Harland, among many veteran voice actors. However, video game reviewers panned the game because none of the movie's actors reprised their roles in the game, and faulted the game's limited acting, which was relegated to mostly radio chatter and mission updates. At one point in college, she had some health issues that led her to take an absence from school and acting, so she pursued production work, which her parents thought would make for a more practical career. She later dropped it as she was encouraged by Oliver to pursue acting and to finish school, eventually landing the lead role as Ayesha in the video game Atelier Ayesha: The Alchemist of Dusk. She described Ayesha as a bit airheaded and ditsy but relatable and resembles her personality at times. Video game reviewer Sean Madson of Diehardgamefan found the dub to be of decent quality, but said Ayesha "sounded a bit too obnoxious with her airheadedness." Matt Sainsbury of Digitally Downloaded thought the dub was reasonable but disliked their American accents as not suiting the Japanese personality of the game. Vince Ingenito of IGN wrote that "both the writing and voice acting fail to lend any weight to her plight. Ayesha seems about as upset over her missing sister as I might be over a glass of spilled milk, making it really hard to care about the outcome of her quest." She also voiced Sadira, a spider-themed woman and new character to the Killer Instinct series.

In 2014, Harlacher voiced Kyoko Kirigiri in Danganronpa: Trigger Happy Havoc. She described Kyoko as the most calm among the wacky characters and always on top of things. Video game reviewers thought the voice acting was okay. In the same year, she voiced Blood Leopard in Accel World, who was similar to Kyoko's stoic disposition. In Sword Art Online, she voiced Sasha, whom she describes as being like a teacher/nun lady who is in charge of the kids who are lost in the game. In the second season of Sword Art Online, she voiced Siune. She also began attending anime conventions as a guest panelist. In voicing Dunya in the Magi: The Labyrinth of Magic series, she found her character to be not your average princess, and that she was fun because she was unpredictable. Her biggest role that year was Ami Kawashima in the romantic comedy Toradora!, a classmate who harbors a mean and bratty personality behind a cheerful perfect-looking facade of a model. As it was one of NIS America's first dub productions for anime, She said they took a long time to call back from the audition, and that it also took more time than other studios in producing the dub for the show. She describes Ami's character as trying to act like she knows what she's doing but does not really have it together, and also her lack of culinary talent. LB Bryant of Japanator said that the Toradora dub release is a "must obtain" item and that "Ami Kawashima equals best girl." Travis Bruno of Capsule Computers said the English dub cast did impressively well and those who only listen to the Japanese tracks would be missing out. She also voiced Mako's mother, Sukuyo Mankanshoku in Kill la Kill, which later ran on Adult Swim's Toonami block in 2015. She described the series as crazy, the Mankanshoku family as ridiculous, and that Sukuyo is very sweet by constantly providing everyone food.

In 2015, Harlacher voiced Mimori Togo in Yuki Yuna is a Hero, one of the main heroines who are called to save their world by interacting in an alternate dimension, where they have super powers. She described Togo as going through a lot of emotional stuff, which helped her expand her acting range. Anime News Network reviewer Theron Martin said that the cast was "appropriately chosen for their roles in a vocal quality sense and handled the acting capably." In the same year, she voiced main character Princess Asseylum Vers Allusia in Aldnoah.Zero as well as Elizabeth in The Seven Deadly Sins, both of which had English dub premieres on Netflix. Manga Entertainment listed Harlacher among their top 5 English voice actresses. In 2016, she landed the voice role of main character Kurapika in the Viz Media English dub of the 2011 anime adaptation of Hunter x Hunter, which premiered on the Toonami block in April. In 2017, she voiced Ann Takamaki, one of the core player characters in the video game Persona 5.

In 2018, Harlacher voiced the main characters in two Netflix-streamed anime series: Violet in Violet Evergarden and Yumeko Jabami in Kakegurui – Compulsive Gambler. In the same year, she landed the role of main character Yugo in the third season of Wakfu: The Animated Series. She also voiced Ondine in season 2 of Miraculous: Tales of Ladybug & Cat Noir. In 2019, Harlacher starred as Sakura Yamauchi in the English dub of the feature anime film I Want to Eat Your Pancreas. On May 16, 2025, Harlacher released her debut studio album Nondisclosure.

== Personal life ==
Harlacher lives in North Hollywood in the Los Angeles area. In 2014, she started a Let's Play video channel on YouTube, where she plays through various games, some of which she has starred in, and others just for fun. She has a younger sister named Natalie. She also owns two dogs. On October 14, 2020, she married long-time partner Luke Stone. Her paternal grandfather, Ervin Harlacher, was the first president of Brookdale Community College. Harlacher is diagnosed with obsessive–compulsive disorder (OCD) and Attention deficit hyperactivity disorder.

=== SAG-AFTRA controversy ===
On April 25, 2025, in response to replies on her TikTok about whether she was going to continue voicing the character Venti in Genshin Impact in Version 5.6, Harlacher claimed that SAG-AFTRA was sending "threatening letters" to her and other actors and actresses who work within SAG's guidelines as financial core members. Many voice actors associated with SAG-AFTRA, such as Kyle McCarley, Corina Boettger, and Bea "LittleKuriboh" Billany, dismissed Harlacher's claim, stating that she broke Global Rule One.

== Filmography ==
=== Anime ===
List of voice performances in anime
Year	Title	Role	Notes	Source
2011	Squid Girl	Customer, Kozue Tanabe		
2011–13	K-On!	Keiko Ida		
2013–14	Nura: Rise of the Yokai Clan: Demon Capital	Wakana Nura, Natsumi Torii		
2013–14	Lagrange: The Flower of Rin-ne	Haruka Uehara, Shoko Igarashi		
2013–14	Accel World	Blood Leopard, Michiru Mita		Press
2013–15	Sword Art Online series	Sasha, Siune		
2014	Toradora!	Ami Kawashima		
2014	JoJo's Bizarre Adventure	Sherry Polnareff		
2014–15	Magi: The Labyrinth of Magic series	Dunya Mustasim	Also Kingdom	
2014–15	Kill la Kill	Sukuyo Mankanshoku	Also OVA	
2015	Yuki Yuna is a Hero	Mimori Togo		
2015–16	Aldnoah.Zero	Asseylum Vers Allusia		
2015–21	The Seven Deadly Sins	Elizabeth Liones		
2016	Love Live!	Erena Todo		
2016	Your Lie in April	Emi Igawa		
2016–17	Hunter × Hunter	Kurapika	2011 series	
2016–17	The Asterisk War	Claudia Enfield		
2016–17	God Eater	Hibari Takeda		
2017	Dragon Ball Super	Videl	Bang Zoom! dub for Toonami Asia	
2017	Occultic;Nine	Asuna Kisaki		
2017	Fate/Apocrypha	Ruler / Joan of Arc		
2018	Violet Evergarden	Violet Evergarden		
2018	Kakegurui	Yumeko Jabami	Netflix dub	
2018	Skip Beat!	Eiko	Eps. 8–9	
2018	Dragon Pilot: Hisone and Masotan	Liliko		
2018	Forest of Piano	Sophie, Arisa		
2018	Megalo Box	Yukiko Shirato		
2018	Back Street Girls: Gokudolls	Aily		
2018	Lost Song	Al Hawkray		
2018–21	Re:Zero − Starting Life in Another World	Crusch Karsten, Meili Portroute		
2019	Record of Grancrest War	Marrine Kreische		
2019	Sailor Moon	Taiki/Sailor Star Maker	Studiopolis dub, Sailor Stars	
2019	Cells at Work!	Immature Thymocyte		
2019	To the Abandoned Sacred Beasts	Nancy Schaal Bancroft		
2019	Teasing Master Takagi-san	Yukari Amakawa	Season 2	
2019–20	Fate/Grand Order - Absolute Demonic Front: Babylonia	Leonardo da Vinci		
2020	Beyblade Burst Rise	Dante Koryu		
2020	Magia Record	Yachiyo Nanami		
2020	Demon Slayer: Kimetsu no Yaiba	Shinobu Kocho		
2020	Science Fell In Love, So I Tried To Prove It	Ena Ibarada		
2020	Beastars	Els		
2020	Ghost in the Shell: SAC_2045	Database AI, Hostess, others		
2020	The Misfit of Demon King Academy	Izabella		
2020	Persona 5: The Animation	Ann Takamaki		
2020–22	Yashahime: Princess Half-Demon	Moe Higurashi		
2021	Beyblade Burst Surge	Dante Koryu		
2021	Vivy: Fluorite Eye's Song	Estella		
2021	Godzilla Singular Point	Mei Kamino	Netflix dub	
2022	Fireball	Drossel von Flügel		
2022	Tekken: Bloodline	Nina Williams		
2024	Pokémon Horizons: The Series	Iono		
2026	The Ramparts of Ice	Koyuki Hikawa		

=== Film ===
List of voice performances in films
Year	Title	Role	Notes	Source
2012	Oblivion Island: Haruka and the Magic Mirror	Additional Voices	Production assistant	
2018	The Seven Deadly Sins the Movie: Prisoners of the Sky	Elizabeth Liones		
2019	I Want to Eat Your Pancreas	Sakura Yamauchi	Limited theatrical release	
2020	A Whisker Away	Yoriko Fukase	Netflix dub	
2020	Ni no Kuni	Miki Midorikawa	Netflix dub	
2020	Violet Evergarden: Eternity and the Auto Memory Doll	Violet Evergarden		
2020	Digimon Adventure: Last Evolution Kizuna	Menoa Belluci		
2021	Demon Slayer: Kimetsu no Yaiba – The Movie: Mugen Train	Shinobu Kocho		

List of direct-to-video voice performances in films
Year	Title	Role	Notes	Source
2021	Case Closed: The Fist of Blue Sapphire	Mitsuhiko Tsuburaya		

=== Video games ===
List of voice performances in video games
Year	Title	Role	Notes	Source
2012	Battleship	Lt. Grace Harland		
2012	PlanetSide 2	VC1 Initiate		Resume
2013	Atelier Ayesha: The Alchemist of Dusk	Ayesha Altugle		
2013	Killer Instinct	Sadira		
2014	Danganronpa: Trigger Happy Havoc	Kyoko Kirigiri		
2014	Earth Defense Force 2025	Wing Diver Soldier B		
2014	Danganronpa 2: Goodbye Despair	Kyoko Kirigiri	Uncredited	Resume
2014	Fairy Fencer F	Harley, Marisa	Also Advent Dark Force	Resume
2014	D4: Dark Dreams Don't Die	Olivia Jones		
2015	Hyperdevotion Noire: Goddess Black Heart	Ryuka		
2015	Omega Quintet	Momoka		
2016	The Technomancer	Amelia Reacher		
2017	Persona 5	Ann Takamaki		
2017	Danganronpa V3: Killing Harmony	Kaede Akamatsu, Tsumugi Shirogane (as Kyoko Kirigiri)		
2018	Persona 5: Dancing in Starlight	Ann Takamaki		
2018	Secret of Mana	Krissie, Lumina (voice)		
2019	Yo-kai Watch 3	Hailey Anne Thomas, Dr. Francesca Stein, Kittylumbus, Benzaiten		
2019	Death end re;Quest	Clea Glaive	Also Death end re;Quest 2	Tweet
2019	AI: The Somnium Files	Aiba		
2019	River City Girls	Noize		
2019	Catherine: Full Body	Ann Takamaki	Persona 5 DLC	
2019	The Legend of Heroes: Trails of Cold Steel III	Juna Crawford		
2020	Granblue Fantasy Versus	Djeeta		
2020	Persona 5 Royal	Ann Takamaki		
2020	Final Fantasy VII Remake	Kyrie Canaan		
2020	Genshin Impact	Venti		
2020	The Legend of Heroes: Trails of Cold Steel IV	Juna Crawford		
2020	Yakuza: Like a Dragon	Yumeno, Manae Miyakoshi		
2020	Fire Emblem Heroes	Guinivere, Nótt		
2021	Re:Zero − Starting Life in Another World: The Prophecy of the Throne	Crusch Karsten		
2021	Persona 5 Strikers	Ann Takamaki		
2021	Ys IX: Monstrum Nox	Raging Bull		
2021	Monster Hunter Rise	Yomogi		
2021	Legends of Runeterra	Dess		
2021	Shadowverse: Champion's Battle	Protagonist (Female)		
2021	Demon Slayer: Kimetsu no Yaiba – The Hinokami Chronicles	Shinobu Kocho		
2022	Relayer	Himiko		
2022	Corpse Factory	Noriko Kurosawa		
2022	AI: The Somnium Files – Nirvana Initiative	Aiba		
2022	River City Girls 2	Marian		
2023	Advance Wars 1+2: Re-Boot Camp	Colin		
2023	The Legend of Heroes: Trails into Reverie	Juna Crawford		
2023	Persona 5 Tactica	Ann Takamaki		
2023	Granblue Fantasy Versus: Rising	Djeeta		
2024	Like a Dragon: Infinite Wealth	Additional voices		
2024	Persona 3 Reload	Additional voices		
2024	Final Fantasy VII Rebirth	Kyrie Canaan		
2025	Like a Dragon: Pirate Yakuza in Hawaii	Additional voices		
2025	Date Everything!	Diana		
2025	Genshin Impact	Istaroth		
2025	Epic Seven	Shepherd of the Dark Diene		
2026	Yakuza Kiwami 3 & Dark Ties	Additional voices		

== Albums ==
- Nondisclosure (2025)

=== Singles ===
- 300 Days –
- I Finally Do –
