= Ann Takamaki =

Persona 5 character

- Persona character
- First game: Persona 5 (2016)
- Designed by: Shigenori Soejima
- Voiced by: EN: Erika Harlacher; JA: Nana Mizuki
- Portrayed by: Yuki Odera

In-universe information
- Nationality: Japanese American

Ann Takamaki (高巻 杏, Takamaki An; Anne Takamaki in the Japanese version) is one of the main characters in the 2016 video game Persona 5. She is a Half Japanese-American teen model, and a second-year student at the fictional Shujin Academy. She is also one of the founding members of the Phantom Thieves of Hearts, a vigilante group formed with the intention of exposing and shaming authority figures guilty of misconduct in the Tokyo Metropolis.

She helps establish the Phantom Thieves to help get revenge on one of her teachers, Suguru Kamoshida, who's sexual harassment drove her friend, Shiho Suzui, to attempt suicide. While in a digital alterntate reality called "The Metaverse" , Takamaki gets supernatural powers which come from her Persona a manifestation of the soul, motivated by her quest for Justice against Kamoshida for his predatory actions, against her, Yuuki Mishima, Ryuji Sakamoto, and Shiho. She adopts the Phantom Thief alias Panther (パンサー, Pansa) based on the red latex catsuit she wears.

== Concept and creation ==
Ann Takamaki was created for Persona 5 by Shigenori Soejima who uses the Phantom Thief nickname Panther to hide her identity. Director Katsura Hashino discussed how she has a foreign air to her that gets attention, but also makes her unapproachable. Ann's Phantom Thief alter ego was always intended to be feline-like. Her Phantom Thief outfit consists of a skin-tight red latex catsuit with a cleavage cutout and zippers, a matching red panther mask, pink gloves, and a clip-on tail on the back of her catsuit. For her footwear, she wears dark red thigh-high boots. Unlike the current red catsuit with a matching cat mask, she was originally going to have a black dress, goggles, a tail, and thigh-high socks. Her next design was more similar to her final design, still featuring goggles and wearing a black catsuit. She lacked a cleavage window in her catsuit and wielded a crossbow instead of a whip. Ann initially gains the Persona Carmen, which eventually transforms into Hecate. The designers noted that the male characters' Personas were comparatively well-known versus female characters' Personas. They felt that if all of them were based on famous gods it would be lacking in depth, so some were made obscure, including Hecate. They still made a point of ensuring that Hecate was a good fit with Ann's personality, however.

Ann is voiced by Nana Mizuki in Japanese and Erika Harlacher in English. Harlacher was contacted to voice Ann for Persona 5, with the request that she give her a voice that was like a "high school girl that was nice but not too nice." In response, she sent a couple samples, which were accepted. Harlacher was excited to play Ann, talking about how she likes how snarky and confident she can be, as well as her growth in the game. When examining her roles, Harlacher noted that Ann was the role that was most similar to her, and that this makes it easier to get into character. She described Ann's voice as being like her own, but a little higher and said that she had a very "forward" voice. She is portrayed by Yuki Odera in Persona 5: The Stage.

She is portrayed by motion capture actor Natsumi Uetake in Persona 5: Dancing Star Night, who scenario writer and choreographer Teppei Kobayashi felt had a similar personality to Ann. Kojiro Ishioka, a dancer for another character, called Ann "very human" and said that Uetake danced in a human way as well. Uetake's performance mostly went well, though Kobayashi noted that she had difficulty dancing at the Persona Show Case. Because Ann has long and slender arms, it made it more difficult to dance there due to Uetake wearing boots. He also noted that Ann's hair was not well-suited for dancing, though noted that she concentrated hard for the performance to avoid hurting the quality. This caused the performance to be significantly difference when compared to a motion-captured performance. Rather than use a wig, Uetake colored her hair to make the portrayal more accurate. Designer Akane Kabayashi was tasked with designing her room in this game, which she made fashionable and straightforward. She felt this was easy due to her similar tastes, though said that since it was a Western-style room, she had to adjust it by adding an air conditioner and power strip to make it more Japanese.

== Appearances ==
Ann originally appeared in Persona 5, where she attends the fictional Shujin Academy as a second-year student in Japan. She is initially a loner, having only one friend in Shiho Suzui, a volleyball player. This is due to her being the victim of rumors surrounding her, due in part to her being mixed race; these rumors at times suggest that she is sexually promiscuous, especially with one of her teachers, Suguru Kamoshida. In reality, Kamoshida is attempting to coerce Ann into sexual relations, threatening to kick Shiho off her starting position in the volleyball team if she does not comply. When she continues to reject his advances, he takes his frustrations out on Shiho, leading to Shiho attempting suicide due to prolonged abuse from Kamoshida. Because of this, Ann joins forces with Joker, Ryuji Sakamoto, and Morgana in order to take him down. The other three had been exploring a world within Kamoshida's heart, called a Palace, and Ann discovers the presence of a Shadow Kamoshida, who is dressed as a king, and is captured upon entering this world due to her resembling a cognitive version of herself that Shadow Kamoshida created. Upon seeing the rest of her friends in danger, she awakens to a power called a Persona from within her heart called Carmen. She kills the cognitive version of herself before driving off Shadow Kamoshida and leaving the Palace for the time being. She and the others eventually return, with the intention of stealing Kamoshida's Treasure, a manifestation of Kamoshida's desires, in order to change Kamoshida in reality. They send a calling card to Kamoshida in real life in order to make him confess his crimes.

Ann also appears in the fighting game Super Smash Bros. Ultimate, where she serves as a collectible, a part of Joker's ultimate attack, and as a background character on Joker's stage. Additionally, Ann is featured in the 2018 anime television series adaptation of Persona 5. In merchandise, Atlus collaborated with clothing company Cospa to produce a replica of Ann's hoodie. In 2026, Ann appears as one of the guest characters from Persona 5 Royal in Season 6 of Call of Duty: Mobile, titled "Take Your Heart". On September 26, she also appeared as a purchasable skin in the video game Fortnite.

== Critical reception ==
Various designs for Ann's Phantom Thief outfit, the final design in the center. It received a mixed response.

Ann Takamaki has been met with mixed reception, with some critics feeling that the game handled her abuse poorly. USgamer writer Nadia Oxford was disappointed with how Ann's sexualisation was handled, such as how her outfit, which felt like it was designed to empower Ann, was met with "lewd comments and jokes" instead. She was also critical of Yusuke blackmailing her into posing nude, and how the game never acknowledges that Ann may not be able to do this due to the abuse she suffered. While she was not opposed to Ann being in a situation like this, she disliked that no one acknowledged how difficult it was for her. She felt that this has only become worse due to how the #MeToo movement has grown and changed. Fellow USgamer writer Caty McCarthy was critical of how the game goes from depicting Ann's trauma in a sympathetic light to having the cast try to force her to pose nude in order to get intel, which they argued was played for laughs. Anime Feminist writer Caitlin Moore was critical of how the anime portrayed Shadow Ann, suggesting that the camera's "leering gaze" and the reaction of Joker and Ryuji make it seem like viewers should be "turned on as we are horrified." Moore disliked her embarrassment over her outfit as well as Morgana's frequent worship of Ann. Moore exclaimed she was "tired of stories that talk out of both sides of their mouth about sexual violence." Waypoint writer Matthew Jones was critical of the game's handling of Ann, believing that more is put into the victimizers than the victims, such as Ann, as well as Ann's limited characterisation. Eurogamer writer Malindy Hetfeld found the way Ann was depicted off-putting, but expressed a lack of surprise that they did not change how she was depicted in Persona 5 Royal, given what she felt was a "standard grab bag of misogyny in Japanese games.", as well as criticising her stereotyping as a "dumb blonde".

Author Laurence Herfs cited author Laura Miller's assessment of "Cool Japan," an initiative by the Japanese government to spread Japanese pop culture to other countries, who considers the "visuals endorsed" by Cool Japan to "rely on a narrow and sexist kind of kawaii soft-pornographic imagery." This description of Cool Japan aligns with Herfs' feelings towards Ann's depiction, criticizing the game for condemning Kamoshida for sexualizing her, yet ultimately going on to "subject her to unnecessary sexualization" for the rest of the game. They cited her outfit and whip in particular, which they stated evoked a "BDSM-inspired aesthetic." They noted that while the narrative suggests the outfit is a show of empowerment, it "clearly caters to a heteronormative male gaze." They were also critical of her interactions with other characters, such as how Morgana becomes jealous at times when other characters talk to her, or how she was blackmailed into stripping for Yusuke. They again cites Miller's views on Cool Japan, who stated that "these Cool Japan performances therefore naturalize women and girls as the objects of paternalistic control and desire." Herfs themselves discussed how this ideology "renders [Ann as] little more than commodified, cooperative objects, a resource for selling the nation under cool capitalism."

Other critics were more positive. SyFy Wire writer Brittany Vincent disagreed with the criticism of Ann's depiction as being sexist or the game "subjecting her to untoward abuse." Vincent argued that Ann is a "powerful character" who takes ownership of her sexuality over time, and discussed how Carmen represents how Ann "likely sees men after going through such a nightmarish time." She described the destruction of the Shadow Ann that Kamoshida created as a show of her opposing both Kamoshida's abuse, but also her opposition to the idea of her as a sexual object. Vincent argued that the banter about Ann's appearance does not bother Ann because she had already taken out "the ultimate creepster" in Kamoshida. She discussed how her Social Link with Joker explores how she grows to take ownership of her body by becoming a model. Vincent considered Ann inspirational, showing that victims in the real world can stand up to their abusers. Nerd Much? writer Emily Auten found herself relating to Ann, specifically to the struggles she went through with bullying and "being seen as a sex object." She described it as "simply amazing" how Ann "overcome[s] her problems and stand[s] up for herself," noting how the extra time she spends with Ann later in the game made her feel like they "actually knew her." Auten felt that Ann and her backstory comprised one of the best aspects of the game, calling her "one of the strongest female characters" in Persona 5. Siliconera writer Jenni Lada counted Ann as one of her favorite party members, discussing how she must already have some "inner strength," due to her protective nature towards Shiho and her aspiration to do better for the sake of her friends.

Takamaki's heritage, being one-quarter American and three-quarters Japanese by descent, has also been a subject of discussion by critics. Wired writer Esther Mollica expressed excitement for Takamaki. Mollica was "instantly drawn to" her for this fact, discussing how the gossiping of Ann as promiscuous stems from a stereotype of Americans as "aggressive and lewd" in Japan. She discussed how Ann has a lack of confidence, owing to the teasing she received from her schoolmates, and despite wanting to be a model, she feels deeply uncomfortable with being seen in a way that is not on her terms. They discussed how Ann becoming a Phantom Thief, her outfit, and acquiring her Persona Carmen represents Ann coming to terms with her sexualization and objectification. Mollica related to this experience, having gone through similar abuse for being mixed race and having dressed in a catsuit and performed as a go-go dancer in order to "rebel and control how other people perceived me." Mollica also related to how Ann is treated as a foreigner, despite being Japanese, due to how they were treated like a foreigner by some of their family members. Writing for USGamer, journalist Georgina Young praised Ann, stating that she "realistically [captures] racism and homogeneity in Japanese society."

Game Revolution writer Matthew Litley drew parallels between the historic Carmen and Ann, discussing how men seem disgusted in both of them, yet are attracted by them nonetheless. He discussed the two of them as being about "freedom in a man's world," as well as the expectations placed upon them for their "foreign and exotic nature."
