= Suguru Kamoshida =

Persona 5 villain

- Persona character
- Suguru Kamoshida in Persona 5
- First appearance: Persona 5 (2016)
- Designed by: Shigenori Soejima
- Portrayed by: Shun Takagi (Persona 5 the Stage)
- Voiced by: EN: D. C. Douglas; JA: Yuji Mitsuya

In-universe information
- Nationality: Japanese

Suguru Kamoshida (Japanese: 鴨志田 卓, Hepburn: Kamoshida Suguru) is a fictional character in the 2016 video game Persona 5. He is the first antagonist that the protagonist, Joker, faces, being a champion volleyball player and current high school coach, who is routinely protected from scrutiny. He regularly exerts violence against multiple characters, including Ryuji Sakamoto and Ann Takamaki, and preemptively discredits anyone he deems a threat, including Joker. He uses his position to abuse male students and sexually assault female students, including Ann's friend, Shiho Suzui, who attempts suicide as a result. He is one of several characters with a Palace, a manifestation of strong desires, where he is depicted as the king of a castle. The principal's failure to protect Shujin Academy's students from him leads to the formation of the Phantom Thieves of Hearts, kickstarting the events of the game.

Kamoshida received generally positive reception as a villain, with critics noting how terrifying and believable he was. This was due to the real-world parallels and how realistic the concept behind his character was, with real-world abusers in similar positions cited as comparable.

== Concept and creation ==
Suguru Kamoshida was created by Persona 5 character designer Shigenori Soejima. A scene depicting his past, particularly a past incident where he was protected for something he did to a woman, was originally planned to be featured in Persona 5 Royal. However, this was ultimately cut, only discovered in a Chinese build of the game. He was voiced in Persona 5 by Yuji Mitsuya and D. C. Douglas in Japanese and English respectively. Kamoshida is portrayed in Persona 5 the Stage by Shun Takagi, who reduced his body fat percentage to eight percent to portray him.

== Appearances ==
Suguru Kamoshida appeared in Persona 5, as well as its re-release, Persona 5 Royal, as its first antagonist. He is a former Olympian and current high school volleyball coach whose reputation allows him to abuse students with impunity. Before the events of the game, he goads Ryuji Sakamoto into acting in such a way that Kamoshida could assault him and claim self-defense, breaking his leg, so that he could get the track team Ryuji was on disbanded. He accomplishes this by spreading rumors and leaking people's details, namely Ryuji's family history. He also has a history of sexually harassing female students, including Ann Takamaki, protected by the school due to his status. He comes to dislike the protagonist, Joker, and preemptively isolates him from the rest of the student body by spreading word of his criminal record, undermining the principal's plan to rehabilitate this "troubled student" as a PR stunt. Joker and Ryuji accidentally venture into something called the Metaverse, another world created from the will and manifestations of people in their world. In this world, a castle is discovered, occupied by someone they are later told by a talking cat named Morgana is a Shadow version of Kamoshida; the castle is his Palace, representing his quasi-dictatorial control of the school. Joker, Ryuji, Morgana, and Ann eventually team up to take him down after he punishes Ann for rebutting his advances by driving Ann's friend Shiho Suzui to suicide and decides to engineer Joker's and Ryuji's expulsion for confronting him. They eventually defeat his Shadow self by stealing his Treasure, causing his real self to become guilty and admit his crimes, upon which he is arrested and loses his job. Kamoshida's confession leads to a public relations disaster that haunts Shujin Academy for the rest of the game due to Principal Kobayakawa's refusal to protect the student body from him. Shadow Kamoshida is later encountered in the final area of the game, Mementos Depths, where he is located in a prison alongside the other antagonists of the game. It is revealed that they, along with all other people, originally had their Shadows in this prison, and that most of the Palace Rulers, including Kamoshida, became apathetic husks rather than genuinely reforming.

Adaptations of Persona 5, including a manga and anime, feature him in a similar capacity. A character similar to him known as Kamoshidaman also appears as an early antagonist in Persona Q2: New Cinema Labyrinth, depicted as a superhero. When he is fought, he transforms into a monstrous rabbit. It is later discovered that Hikari became disillusioned with teachers as a whole when her elementary school teacher poisoned the class' pet rabbit by providing her and two other students unsuitable food to feed it with and scapegoated her when the rabbit died because she happened to be the one who spoke out about the food. This took a form resembling Kamoshida when the Phantom Thieves became trapped in the cinema because he happened to be the founding members' worst experience with a teacher.

== Reception ==
Comic Book Resources writer Robert Crosby considered Kamoshida the most terrifying villain of Persona 5 due to how realistic he was. He spoke of how other villains in Persona 5 feel more fantastical, but Kamoshida is very real, something people deal with in sports, suggesting that he may be based on judoka Masato Uchishiba. Writer Jeff Vogel stated that Kamoshida, who he describes as a "serial rapist" and "one of the most loathsome characters [he's] ever seen in a video game", was horrifying because of how "believable" he was, comparing him to more fantastical villains, and noting that what he engaged in could and did happen in the real world, "to the point of being mundane". VG247 writer Alan Wen discussed how Kamoshida is based on the "corporal punishment" found in Japanese school sports clubs, as well as how his sexual abuse of high school girls reflected the #MeToo movement that had gained prominence in 2017. Fellow VG247 writer Caty McCarthy was critical of the game's handling of Kamoshida and his crimes, particularly for not calling it rape and for the fact that the game later sexualizes and objectifies Ann.

Writer Arnaud Bourdouxhe-Nélissen discussed Kamoshida's mindset of viewing the male students as toys for abuse and female students as sexually submissive slaves, discussing how this reflects a twisted version of his own reality. He added that Kamoshida represented the sin of lust, discussing both his sexual proclivities as well as his castle being filled with sexual imagery. The Ringer writer Justin Charity described him as one of the most "breathtaking" villains in video games. Anime News Network writer Elliot Gay discussed the real-world contrasts in Kamoshida's story, discussing multiple similar real-world situations. Specifically, he cited a 17-year-old boy who committed suicide followed by routine beatings by his coach. While discussing how Kamoshida's peers handled him, Gay noted that this was handled realistically, citing a teacher who was found guilty of abusing 12 of his female students, but was only punished with a one-month pay cut.
