= Persona 5 (manga) =

Japanese manga series

- First tankōbon volume cover

ペルソナ5 (Perusona 5)
- Created by: Atlus
- Manga
- Written by: Hisato Murasaki
- Published by: Shogakukan
- English publisher: NA: Viz Media
- Imprint: Ura Sunday Comics
- Magazine: MangaONE; Ura Sunday
- Original run: September 15, 2016 – present
- Volumes: 17

Persona 5 (Japanese: ペルソナ5, Hepburn: Perusona 5) is a Japanese manga series written and illustrated by Hisato Murasaki based on the Persona 5 video game by Atlus. It began serialization on Shogakukan's MangaONE app and Ura Sunday website in September 2016.

== Plot ==
The manga is an adaptation of Persona 5, including characters and events from the game's updated re-release Persona 5 Royal.

== Publication ==
Written and illustrated by Hisato Murasaki, Persona 5 began serialization on Shogakukan's MangaONE app on September 15, 2016. It has also been serialized on the Ura Sunday website since September 22, 2016. Its chapters have been collected into seventeen tankōbon volumes as of November 2026. The series is licensed in North America by Viz Media.

=== Volumes ===
No.	Original release date	Original ISBN	North American release date	North American ISBN
1	August 10, 2017	978-4-09-127750-3	January 14, 2020	978-1-9747-1175-8
Chapters 1–6
2	December 12, 2017	978-4-09-128045-9	April 14, 2020	978-1-9747-1197-0
Chapters 7–11
3	April 12, 2018	978-4-09-128265-1	July 14, 2020	978-1-9747-1469-8
Chapters 12–16; Bonus
4	September 19, 2018	978-4-09-128520-1	October 13, 2020	978-1-9747-1470-4
Chapters 17–22; Bonus
5	May 10, 2019	978-4-09-129199-8	January 12, 2021	978-1-9747-1471-1
Chapters 23–28
6	January 17, 2020	978-4-09-129540-8	April 13, 2021	978-1-9747-1939-6
Chapters 29–34; Bonus
7	August 19, 2020	978-4-09-850226-4	August 10, 2021	978-1-9747-2300-3
Chapters 35–40
8	March 18, 2021	978-4-09-850482-4	January 11, 2022	978-1-9747-2805-3
Chapters 41–45
9	October 18, 2021	978-4-09-850755-9	October 18, 2022	978-1-9747-3403-0
Chapters 46–51
10	May 18, 2022	978-4-09-851110-5	June 20, 2023	978-1-9747-3698-0
Chapters 52–58
11	December 12, 2022	978-4-09-851447-2	December 19, 2023	978-1-9747-4110-6
Chapters 59–64
12	August 18, 2023	978-4-09-852671-0	July 16, 2024	978-1-9747-4700-9
Chapters 65–71
13	March 12, 2024	978-4-09-853151-6	May 13, 2025	978-1-9747-5488-5
Chapters 72–77
14	November 12, 2024	978-4-09-853698-6	December 9, 2025	978-1-9747-5817-3
Chapters 78–83
15	May 12, 2025	978-4-09-854099-0	May 12, 2026	978-1-9747-6299-6
Chapters 84–90.1
16	February 12, 2026	978-4-09-854425-7	January 12, 2027	978-1-9747-6981-0
Chapters 90.2-96; Bonus
17	November 12, 2026	978-4-09-854889-7		

== See also ==
- Persona 5: The Animation
