= Persona 5 =

2016 video game

- Developer: P-Studio
- Publishers: JP/NA: Atlus; PAL: Deep Silver; WW: Sega (Royal)
- Directors: Katsura Hashino; Daiki Ito (Royal)
- Producers: Katsura Hashino; Kazuhisa Wada (Royal)
- Designer: Katsura Hashino
- Programmers: Yujiro Kosaka; Takahiro Nowatari (Royal)
- Artists: Masayoshi Suto; Shigenori Soejima; Naoya Maeda; Mumon Usuda (Royal)
- Writers: Yuichiro Tanaka; Shinji Yamamoto
- Composer: Shoji Meguro
- Series: Persona
- Platforms: PlayStation 3; PlayStation 4; Nintendo Switch; PlayStation 5; Windows; Xbox One; Xbox Series X/S
- Release: September 15, 2016: Persona 5; PS3, PS4; JP: September 15, 2016; WW: April 4, 2017; Persona 5 Royal; PS4; JP: October 31, 2019; WW: March 31, 2020; NS, PS5, Win, XBO, XSXS; WW: October 21, 2022
- Genres: Role-playing, social simulation
- Mode: Single-player

Persona 5 (Note: Japanese: ペルソナ5, Hepburn: Perusona Faibu) is a 2016 role-playing video game developed by P-Studio. The game is the sixth installment in the Persona series, itself a spin-off from the Megami Tensei franchise. Published by Atlus in Japan and North America, and Deep Silver in PAL territories, it was released for PlayStation 3 and PlayStation 4 in Japan on September 15, 2016 and worldwide on April 4, 2017. An enhanced version featuring new content, Persona 5 Royal, (Note: Japanese: ペルソナ5 ザ・ロイヤル, Hepburn: Perusona Faibu Za Roiyaru; known as Persona 5 the Royal in Japan) was released by Atlus for PlayStation 4 in Japan on October 31, 2019, while parent company Sega published the game worldwide on March 31, 2020. Royal was released on the PlayStation 5, Xbox One, Xbox Series X/S, Nintendo Switch, and Windows on October 21, 2022.

As with previous games in the series, the party battles enemies known as Shadows using physical manifestations of their psyche known as Personas. The game incorporates role-playing and dungeon crawling elements alongside social simulation scenarios. Set in modern-day Tokyo, the story follows a player-named high school student, referred to by his codename Joker. After being framed for assault and put on probation, the protagonist relocates to the fictional neighborhood Yongen-Jaya and transfers to a new school. Over the course of a school year, he and other acquainted students awaken to a special power, becoming a group of secret vigilantes referred to as the Phantom Thieves of Hearts. The group explores a supernatural realm born from humanity's subconscious desires nicknamed the Metaverse, in order to steal malevolent intent from the hearts of adults. Its themes revolve around attaining freedom from the limitations of modern society; the story was strongly inspired by picaresque fiction, and the party's Personas were based on literary outlaws and rebels.

First announced in 2013, Persona 5 was developed by P-Studio, an internal development division within Atlus, at the time led by game director and producer Katsura Hashino. Along with Hashino, returning staff from earlier Persona games included character designer Shigenori Soejima and music composer Shoji Meguro. Work on the game began during Persona 4's development and commenced into full production after the release of Catherine in 2011. Initially slated for a late 2014 release date, Persona 5 saw several delays due to being unfinished.

Persona 5 received critical acclaim, with praise directed towards its visual presentation, gameplay, story, characters, and music. The release of Royal saw additional acclaim for its new content and expansion on the original game. Including Royal, Persona 5 is the best-selling title in the Megami Tensei franchise, with over 11.8 million copies sold by June 2026. Since its release, critics have regarded Persona 5 as one of the greatest video games of all time. As with prior series entries, related media based on the game have been produced, including four spin-off games, manga and anime adaptations, and the cast's appearances in other games—most notably Joker's appearance in Super Smash Bros. Ultimate (2018). A sequel, Persona 5 Strikers, was released on February 20, 2020, developed by Koei Tecmo's Omega Force studio in collaboration with Atlus.

== Gameplay ==
Joker, the game's protagonist, has two alternating lifestyles: a normal student life (top) and exploring otherworldly locations (bottom).

Persona 5 is a role-playing video game where the player takes on the role of a male high school student, codenamed Joker, who lives out a single year while attending school in modern-day Tokyo. The game is governed by a day-night cycle and weather systems that determine general behavior, similar to a social simulation game. The year is punctuated by scripted and random events as Joker attends school, and outside of school he can have part-time jobs, pursue leisure activities, or create items for use in dungeons or in battle. Joker's activities in the real world affect his social statistics; increasing these values grants additional activities and options. When in the real world, Joker can develop character relationships known as "Confidants"; an evolution of the "Social Link" system from Persona 3 and Persona 4. With this system, he can converse with and improve his relationship with other characters he meets, with some leading to possible romances. Improving Confidant ranks with party members unlocks various abilities for use in combat. Improving ranks with non-party Confidants grants other bonuses, such as access to new equipment or boosting experience point gains.

Alongside the normal school life is dungeon crawling gameplay of two different types within a realm called the Metaverse: story-specific dungeons called Palaces and a randomly generated dungeon called Mementos. Both are populated by Shadows, physical manifestations of suppressed psyches modeled after mythological and religious figures. Within the dungeons of Mementos, the party can fulfill quests received from Confidants and other non-player characters. While navigating, the party can use stealth to avoid enemy Shadows, and some areas hold puzzles that can be solved using Joker's "Third Eye" ability, which highlights interactable objects and enemy strength. Throughout Palaces are locations known as "Safe Rooms", where the player can save their game and fast travel to other safe rooms within the Palace.

As with previous entries in the series, the game uses a turn-based combat system. Battles can be initiated when the party runs into an enemy, or they can launch an ambush and gain an advantage in battle. In battle, the party has weapons and can summon Personas: manifestations of the main characters' inner psyche that are used mainly for special attacks. If a character strikes an enemy's weakness, they knock the enemy down and are awarded an additional turn. If all enemies are knocked down, a "Hold Up" is triggered, during which the party can launch a devastating "All-Out Attack", demand money or items, or convince a selected Shadow to become one of Joker's Personas. Party members are knocked out when they lose all of their health points, and the game ends if Joker is knocked out.

New Personas can be gained from battle through successful negotiation, and different Persona types are represented through different arcana linked to Confidant links. Personas can be combined, or "fused" within the Velvet Room, a realm Joker visits throughout the story. In the Velvet Room, Personas can be fused through the "Guillotine" fusion process, with the resultant Persona inheriting skills and stats from its parents. More skills are passed on depending on how many skills a Persona has, and the strength of the resulting Persona depends on how advanced its associated Confidant link is. Personas can be sacrificed by "Hanging" to grant experience points to another Persona or by being sent to the "Electric Chair" to create a high-end item. A Persona can also be sent into "Solitary Confinement" for multiple days to undergo intensive training and gain additional skills quicker than normal.

Minor online social elements are incorporated through the "Thieves Guild" feature, where players can see what activities other players did during any given day or aid other players in the Metaverse.

== Synopsis ==
=== Setting and characters ===
Persona 5 takes place within the Persona universe, revolving around a group of high school students who harness Personas, physical manifestations of their inner psyche. The story begins on April 9 "20XX (2016)" and spans roughly a year. It is set in modern-day Tokyo and features several real-world locations, including Akihabara, Shinjuku, and Shibuya. A major setting throughout the game is Shujin Academy, a high school that the protagonist attends. The second major location is the "Metaverse", a supernatural realm consisting of the physical manifestations of humanity's subconscious desires. In the Metaverse, people with corrupted desires form their own unique "Palace," which is modeled after their distorted perception of a place in the real world, along with a Shadow version of themselves (their true self) possessing a "Treasure" symbolic of their desires. Returning from earlier entries is the Velvet Room, a place that exists for the growth of Persona users and shifts appearance depending on the current guest; in Persona 5, it takes the form of a prison.

The player character is a silent protagonist, a commonplace feature in the Persona series, codenamed Joker. He becomes the leader of a vigilante group known as the Phantom Thieves of Hearts, who change the hearts of criminals and other malevolent people through the Metaverse. He is joined by school delinquent Ryuji Sakamoto, fashion model Ann Takamaki, and Morgana, a mysterious cat-like creature. As the game progresses, the group recruits more members, including art prodigy Yusuke Kitagawa, student council president Makoto Niijima, hikikomori computer hacker Futaba Sakura, and cultured corporate heiress Haru Okumura. Also interacting with Joker are high school detective Goro Akechi, public prosecutor and Makoto's older sister Sae Niijima, and Igor and his two assistants Caroline and Justine, who are residents of the Velvet Room.

=== Plot ===
The game opens with the protagonist, codenamed Joker, being captured by the police after carrying out the heist of a casino. The police inform Joker that he has been betrayed by a member of his group, and he is interrogated by prosecutor Sae Niijima. Much of the story is told through flashbacks as Joker recounts events to Sae.

After preventing a sexual assault, Joker was framed for assault by the perpetrator. He is put on probation and sent to stay with family friend Sojiro Sakura in Tokyo while attending Shujin Academy. After his arrival, he is drawn into the Velvet Room, where Igor, alongside his assistants, Caroline and Justine, cryptically warns him that he must be 'rehabilitated' to avoid future ruin and grants him access to a supernatural mobile app. The app transports Joker and fellow Shujin student Ryuji Sakamoto into an alternate realm known as the Metaverse, where they find the Palace of Shujin's abusive and lustful gym teacher Suguru Kamoshida. Joker and Ryuji awaken to their Personas when they are attacked by Kamoshida's Shadow self, and team up with Morgana, a mysterious cat-like creature who knows much about the Metaverse. Morgana explains that it is possible to change wicked people's hearts by stealing their 'Treasure', the physical manifestation of their distorted desires. Fellow student Ann Takamaki also stumbles into Kamoshida's Palace, and after Kamoshida's bullying and predatory advances cause Ann's best friend Shiho to attempt suicide, Ann joins Joker's group. Together, they resolve to change Kamoshida's heart and battle through the Palace to steal the Treasure, causing the real-world Kamoshida to offer an abject public apology and turn himself in to the police.

Joker, Morgana, Ryuji and Ann form the Phantom Thieves of Heart, declaring the aim of stealing corruption from the hearts of adults to reform society. Over the next few months, they investigate and change the hearts of Ichiryusai Madarame, a plagiarising artist; Junya Kaneshiro, a yakuza boss guilty of extortion and blackmail; Futaba Sakura, a teenage hikikomori hacker; and Kunikazu Okumura, a fast food CEO who mistreats his workers. The Phantom Thieves are joined along the way by Yusuke Kitagawa, an artistic prodigy and Madarame's exploited pupil; Makoto Niijima, Shujin's student council president and Sae's younger sister; Futaba, who is also Sojiro's adopted daughter; and Haru Okumura, daughter of Kunikazu. The Phantom Thieves slowly learn of a conspiracy to influence events, which is responsible for the murder of Futaba's mother and several other mysterious deaths. Public support for the Phantom Thieves' actions grows, but the group also arouses the suspicions of the police, Sae, and celebrity junior detective Goro Akechi.

A black-masked assassin enters the Metaverse and kills Kunikazu Okumura's Shadow self, framing the Phantom Thieves for his death in the real world. Akechi joins the group and convinces them to change Sae's heart in order to prove their innocence. After infiltrating Sae's Palace, Joker is captured by the police and interrogated by Sae, bringing the story full-circle. Over the course of the interrogation, Joker convinces Sae that the Phantom Thieves are not responsible for the murders. Akechi, revealed to be the assassin, enters the interrogation room and appears to kill Joker. However, it is revealed that the Phantom Thieves had discovered Akechi's treachery soon after he joined them by wiretapping his phone; through an elaborate ruse, they remotely activated the Metaverse app on Joker's phone to pull Akechi into the version of the interrogation room located in Sae's Palace where he killed Sae's cognition of Joker, allowing Sae to rescue the real Joker.

Joker goes into hiding while the Phantom Thieves learn the conspiracy's leader is politician Masayoshi Shido, who is also the man that framed Joker for assault. Shido had Akechi carry out the murders in the Metaverse to eliminate political opponents, and campaigns for prime minister by promising to capture the Phantom Thieves. When the Phantom Thieves infiltrate Shido's Palace, they are confronted by Akechi, who reveals that he is Shido's illegitimate son and that he had colluded with him as part of a plan to get revenge on Shido for abandoning him as a child. After being defeated, Akechi sacrifices himself to allow the Phantom Thieves to escape and change Shido's heart.

Despite Shido's confession and arrest, the public are unwilling to accept that his crimes occurred and continue to blindly follow him. Suspecting that something is wrong in Mementos, the Palace of the public's collective unconscious, the Phantom Thieves infiltrate Mementos and discover that the public's desire to surrender free will and be ruled over has caused the Treasure, in the form of the Holy Grail, to attain sentience as the God of Control, Yaldabaoth. Yaldabaoth merges Mementos with reality, triggering the end of the world and causing the Phantom Thieves to disappear. They awaken in the Velvet Room, where Caroline and Justine regain their memories and merge into Lavenza, their proper form. Lavenza explains that Yaldabaoth had imprisoned and impersonated the real Igor all along. Through a wager made with Igor over humanity's goals, Yaldabaoth gave Joker and Akechi their abilities but ensured that Joker would fail to prove that living with ambition is useless, while Igor created Morgana to lead Joker to the truth. Yaldabaoth offers to return the world to its previous state at the cost of humanity's freedom to think for themselves, but Joker refuses.

Joker's allies rally the public to fight back against Yaldabaoth, allowing the Phantom Thieves to return to reality and confront him. Joker awakens to his ultimate Persona, Satanael, and destroys Yaldabaoth and the Metaverse. After Yaldabaoth's defeat, Joker turns himself in to the police for Shido to be prosecuted. While Joker is incarcerated, the rest of the Phantom Thieves and his confidants help secure evidence of his innocence in the assault charge, leading to his conviction being overturned. In spring, Joker's friends drive him back to his hometown.

The game has several alternate endings depending on the player's choices. If Joker fails to convince Sae of the truth during his interrogation, Akechi succeeds in killing the real Joker. If Joker accepts Yaldabaoth's offer, the Phantom Thieves return to fame but humanity willingly allows itself to be ruled over by Yaldabaoth.

==== Royal ====
Persona 5 Royal introduces two new characters that interact with the Phantom Thieves throughout the school year: Kasumi Yoshizawa, a first-year Shujin student and accomplished gymnast, and Takuto Maruki, Shujin's kind-hearted guidance counsellor who supports students through talk therapy sessions. If Joker develops his relationship with Maruki, the game is extended beyond the original endpoint to an optional third semester (January through March).

After defeating Yaldabaoth, Akechi reappears and turns himself in to the police in Joker's place. As the new year begins, Joker finds reality distorted, with many people inexplicably becoming peaceable and contented. Each Phantom Thief has had their deepest wish granted, with several deceased family members being brought back to life and Morgana becoming human, while Joker, Akechi and Kasumi are the only people who notice the abnormalities. The three investigate a new Palace resembling a futuristic, utopian hospital, and encounter Maruki, the Palace's owner. It is revealed that Maruki gained Yaldabaoth's power and awakened to his Persona due to the public's belief in the Phantom Thieves and Maruki's wish to heal their past traumas. Maruki used this power to create his ideal reality, free from pain and loss.

Maruki further reveals to Joker that the person he knew as Kasumi Yoshizawa is in fact her younger sister, Sumire. The real Kasumi was killed while saving Sumire's life from a traffic collision; overwhelmed by guilt and depression, Sumire expressed the wish to be Kasumi during a counselling session with Maruki, who granted her wish by brainwashing her into believing she was her sister. Maruki gives Joker and Akechi a time limit to decide whether they will accept the reality he has created.

The Phantom Thieves, joined by Akechi and Sumire, decide they cannot accept a reality where they have no opportunity to grow by overcoming their own struggles, even if it means living in an unjust world. They infiltrate the Palace and defeat Maruki, causing reality to return to normal and Akechi to disappear, as in the real world he was killed in Shido's Palace. After Joker's conviction is overturned, the Phantom Thieves reflect on going their separate ways: Ryuji transfers to another school to compete in track and field, Ann pursues a modelling career, Yusuke remains in Tokyo to work as an artist, Makoto aims to become a police commissioner, Futaba begins attending high school, Haru plans to open a coffee shop, Sumire trains for international gymnastics, and Morgana accompanies Joker back to his hometown. As he returns home, Joker encounters the reformed Maruki working as a taxi driver.

== Development ==
The game was developed by P-Studio, an internal development studio within Atlus dedicated to handling the Persona series. Preparatory development began in 2008 following the release of Persona 4, with full development beginning following the release of Catherine in 2011. Development lasted five years. Series director Katsura Hashino was only fully involved in development after Catherine was finished, later calling the latter game a test for the next Persona game's development. Persona 5 would be Hashino's last game in the series as the leader of P-Studio, as he would afterwards form a separate internal team called Studio Zero. When production started, the staff consisted of around 40 people. During full production, this number expanded to 70 with 15 planners, 15 programmers, and between 30 and 45 designers. These included lead designer Naoya Maeda, who had previously done modeling work for the Trauma Center series. The general development was a challenge for the team, as they intentionally changed their development structure due to the more powerful hardware they were working with.

While the final game retains the turn-based battle system from earlier entries, one of the early design drafts was for an action-based system incorporating real-time elements foreign to the series. This idea was ultimately scrapped, but real-time command elements were introduced into the battle system, allowing the gameplay to evolve without extensive changes to the core system. One major new addition was unique dungeons with locked layouts as opposed to the predominantly randomly generated dungeons of previous Persona games. This was done to better emulate the game's themes and provide veteran players with something different. A returning feature from both earlier Persona games and the mainline Megami Tensei series was Negotiation. As it was considered a key part of the overall franchise by fans, Hashino decided to reintroduce it after being absent from the previous two mainline entries. The Negotiation system for Persona 5 was tied into the origins of Shadows as suppressed psyches within the Collective Unconscious. The "Hold Up" function was inspired by scenes in films where the antagonist would hold people at gunpoint and make demands. These functions were incorporated due to the game being in part a celebration of the series' history. In-game weather and environmental elements were all designed to reflect the real world. Dungeon layout was split into three distinct types: the Tokyo overworld environments, "institutions" such as Joker's high school, and dungeon environments. Some segments take control away from the player aside from limited dialogue choices; this was chosen as it reflects the controlled environment of Japanese high schoolers.

While Catherine used the third-party Gamebryo game engine, Persona 5 uses a specially created engine. Hashino believed that the new engine would make rendering their ideas much easier, although it would result in a long wait by fans for the game. The event scene software was also developed internally by Atlus, with an estimated 1,160 scenes being included in the final game. The tools for developing and handling them were greatly expanded over the previous two entries so as to better utilize the more advanced hardware. Character modeling, in general, was handled with a specially developed cel-shader which helped properly translate the character designs into the game, while also allowing for easy adjustment of shaders and lighting effects during fine-tuning. The characters were originally rendered realistically like in Catherine, but the team felt that it was "wrong" for the Persona series. With this in mind, the team did some trial and error before finding a style that satisfied them, doing something similar for the interface and menu design. In contrast to Persona 4, which has a general deformed look due to the PlayStation 2's hardware limitations on the variety of body shapes, the technology available to the team for Persona 5 enabled unique customization for all relevant character models. Two different models were used for members of the main cast: a detailed model for real-time cutscenes, and a general-use model for general event scenes and gameplay. Persona 5 marked the first time a large number of Personas had been rendered in high definition, something which proved a grueling challenge for the team.

=== Story and themes ===
The original story concept was written by Hashino, while the scenario was co-written by Yuichiro Tanaka and Shinji Yamamoto. The initial concept was for a storyline that diverged from the established paths of Persona 3 and 4, with "self-discovery" and "journey" being its keywords. Originally using the concept of a backpacking trip around the world as a framing device for the story, Hashino decided to refocus on Japan in the wake of the 2011 Tōhoku earthquake and tsunami. More specifically, it has been noted that the Japanese government's actions in response to the earthquake and tsunami's fallout, along with Japanese citizens' reactions to how the government acted during that time, may have served as partial influences on the game's themes. Following that crisis and seeing how people were bonding in the face of it, Hashino decided to have the story take place solely in Japan, with the journeying being done through the ever-shifting (dungeon-like) Palaces. Ultimately, the story's central concepts were inspired by equivalent social changes he saw in modern society, particularly in Japan. Hashino also described the central theme of the game as being about freedom and how the characters attain it. He wanted to make the game more "thematically approachable" for newcomers to the series, and to be an emotional experience that left its audience with a strong sense of catharsis and the inspiration to take on problems in their lives.

The narrative of Persona 5 was designed like an omnibus, with the antagonists pursued by the party changing regularly. The development team has cited three main stories as inspiration, the Chinese novel Water Margin, the Japanese crime movie Hakuchuu no Shikaku, and the Spanish novel Lazarillo de Tormes. Furthermore, the setting and style was compared to picaresque fiction; the team originally asked the question of how a character like Lupin III might win appeal in modern society. This picaresque theme was carried over into the aesthetics of Persona fusion and sacrifice, which were themed after styles of capital punishment. Having a more "stereotypical" theme enabled the team to create surprising story developments, mixing contemporary drama with the setting of the Persona series. The series' recurring motif of "masks" was used more overtly in the game's plot than previous entries as well, and the game's main locations were based heavily on their real-world counterparts.

The main characters, according to Hashino, share a mindset that they "no longer have a place where they belong in society", though the events of the game give them a sense of belonging. Hashino stated that while the last few games were about the protagonists chasing the antagonists, Persona 5 would instead more prominently feature the antagonists and phenomena caused by them chasing the protagonists during the latter's activities. The characters have been described as "juvenile academics," with their activities as thieves being part of the way they break from societal norms and express themselves. Adhering with this concept, the game's main aim was to show the characters finding the courage to go outside the normal limits of society as set by previous generations. In contrast to previous Persona casts, the party of Persona 5 willingly embrace the unfolding unusual events in their role of masked vigilantes rather than being dragged into them. The cast was originally going to be larger with character Hifumi Togo becoming a Phantom Thief, but as the story was already very large, she was relegated to an optional role as part of the Confidant system. Technological advances such as smartphones and the use of social media were integrated into both the story and gameplay due to their growing prevalence in modern society and how the public responds to real-world scandals.

The characters' initial Personas (Arsène, Captain Kidd, Carmen, Zorro, Goemon, Johanna, Necronomicon, Milady, Robin Hood, and Cendrillon) were themed after outlaws and picaresque heroes to reflect the function and dominant suppressed passions forming the Palace, and also represent aspects of their owners' personalities. Joker's initial Persona was originally the German demon Mephistopheles, but was changed to Arsène as the latter character better fit the game's themes. The cast's ultimate Personas (Satanael, Seiten Taisei, Hecate, Mercurius, Kamu Susano-o, Anat, Prometheus, Astarte, Loki and Vanadis) were based on mythical beings who act as tricksters or rebels. The three main inspirations behind Joker's alter ego were Arsène Lupin, The Fiend with Twenty Faces, and Japanese outlaw hero Ishikawa Goemon. The name of Joker's high school, "Shujin", was chosen because it was a homonym of Shūjin (囚人), the Japanese word for "prisoner". Following a trend from earlier entries, the Velvet Room assistants are named after characters from the novel Frankenstein by Mary Shelley.

The use of adults as antagonists was a more overt expression of narrative elements previously explored in Persona 4. The relation to police activities was also carried over from Persona 4, but this time with the role of protagonists and antagonists reversed. Several writers have highlighted the parallels between the game's various antagonists with real incidents and figures in different sectors of Japanese society (e.g. political, corporate, academic), and how the game's story and characters serve as social commentary on life in Japan. The game's villains and protagonists were also constructed to be parallels of each other, both groups being misfits trying to shape a world they saw as unsatisfactory or corrupted. This was intended to create moral ambiguity about the Phantom Thieves' actions, causing the player to question their concept of justice and their mission as a whole. In addition, the way a vocal minority online could draw attention to and shift public opinion on events and scandals in the news was cited as an inspiration for the ambiguous nature of the Phantom Thieves' actions.

=== Art design ===
The art director was Masayoshi Suto, whose most notable work on earlier games included the user interface (UI) displays. Shigenori Soejima, who had worked on the last two main-series Persona games, returned as character designer. The art design reflects the picaresque theme aimed for by the rest of the team. Aesthetically, the team felt that they were picking up where Persona 4 left off. Its styling presentation was an unintentional reflection on the hurdles the team needed to overcome during development. The teaser image used for the game's announcement was designed to convey a sense of the main characters' being chained down by the rules of the modern world. Soejima designed the logo to convey the high-speed existences of the young cast, while elements such as Joker's Persona Arsène were designed to appear old-fashioned by comparison. This presented challenges as Soejima needed to balance this with a strong sense of style.

Soejima was working on prospective designs for the game while Persona 4 was still in development, with his designs evolving as the story for Persona 5 came together. The first character sketches were submitted in 2012. Soejima worked closely with Hashino so the characters and environments reflected the game's themes. Due to being high school students, Soejima found it difficult to make each main character's uniform design distinctive, so he expressed their individuality through their thief costumes. Joker's design was cited by Soejima as his most challenging recent work. Joker needed to both convey a taste of the game's overall art style and to act as an avatar for the player. As the main theme and narrative of Persona 5 revolved around crime and vigilantes triggered by Joker voluntarily choosing that path, Soejima needed to convey this while allowing the character to suit whatever dialogue choices the player decided upon. Due to these difficulties, Joker was given multiple designs in a trial and error process to find the best one. As the "phantom thief" premise was a common stereotype in fiction, Soejima initially drew Joker and the main cast in a style similar to shōnen manga, but these designs were scrapped as they clashed with the Persona series' realistic aesthetics. As with previous entries, the protagonist is a silent character, so Soejima had to work out a way Joker could communicate without dialogue. His solution was to imagine him as the type of person who made plans but did not share them with others. The Persona designs, being based on characters from literature, were intended to evoke both familiarity and surprise from players. Once the names were chosen, Soejima designed the Personas based on that character. The main aim for the game's environments was to create a sense of realism, with its version of Tokyo being modeled after real world locations.

As the team considered previous Persona games to be "fun" but not well marketed, the UI was designed in such a way as to attract a larger, more mainstream audience. When creating the UI, Hashino wanted to demonstrate how a shift in perspective could alter a dull life into an exciting one in the context of the story. Early UI designs were so "aggressively animated" that it obscured what was happening in the game. As a result, the animations were toned down and text orientation was altered, toning down the UI's graphical elements to present a balance between user-friendliness and style. Following the respective thematic coloring of Persona 3 and 4's blue and yellow, Persona 5 uses red, which was chosen to evoke a harsh feeling. Because of this, Suto tested multiple font colors until settling on black and white, as it stood out best against it. Rather than the use of sub-colors like earlier entries, the UI uses only the primary red, black and white colors aside from health and magic point meters, with the menus using a special moving 3D model of Joker which changes position depending on the selected menu.

The game's animated cutscenes were produced by Production I.G and Domerica, and were directed and supervised by Toshiyuki Kono. Kono was contacted three and a half years before the game's completion by Hashino. Faced with the project, Kono felt a great deal of pressure in his role. Persona 5 was the first time Production I.G had worked on the series, though many staff at the studio were fans. Despite this, the studio did not change their standard animation process, focusing on characters as they had done for many of their previous projects. The most important part of the cutscenes was getting the character's expressions right, particularly when it came to the general-mute protagonist. The animated opening sequence was directed by Sayo Yamamoto. The concept behind the characters figure skating around the environment was done as a visual symbolization of the overall theme of breaking free of an oppressive force, and was similar to her work in Yuri on Ice. The scene where Joker first summons his Persona was requested by Atlus to appear "wild", which was difficult as Joker's purpose is as an extension of the player. The blue flame effects related to the Persona were not created with CGI, but hand-drawn by the animators. All the anime cutscenes together were estimated to consist of over an hour of footage.

=== Music ===
The score was composed, performed, and produced by series sound director Shoji Meguro. Further contributions, among other general sound design, was handled by Toshiki Konishi, Kenichi Tsuchiya, Atsushi Kitajoh, and Ryota Kozuka; all of them having previously worked on the series as well. Meguro was given full creative freedom to work on the soundtrack and over a roughly three-year period produced about 80% of the total tracks. Seven tracks were performed in English by Lyn (Note: Lyn's full name is Lyn Inaizumi.), a jazz and soul music singer. Her first performance in a video game, Lyn claimed that the most difficult part of her contributions was performing a rap segment in the opening theme, "Wake Up, Get Up, Get Out There". The lyrics were written by Benjamin Franklin, while the ending song, "Hoshi To Bokura To", had lyrics written in Japanese by Shigeo Komori.

To express the game's mood, Meguro incorporated strong acid jazz elements into the score. He also wanted to make the music sound more realistic than previous entries, aiming to match the visuals. Meguro also changed the way the music flowed when compared to the last two Persona games. Instead of the opening and ending themes being conglomerates of the overall score, he described the entire score as a single continuous work. A recurring musical element was described as a "do-la" syllable; the opening uses "so la re mi" on strings as a hook, which then leads into the "do-la" syllable for other tracks, including the normal battle theme. While he was creating the music, Meguro received positive comments from Hashino when he made early tracks created for an internal demo.

A three-disc soundtrack was released in Japan by Mastard Records on January 17, 2017. Upon its debut, the album reached fifth on the Oricon charts with sales of over 29,000. The album features 110 tracks with commentary from the sound team, while the cover and liner note artwork were designed by Soejima. In addition to the soundtrack, a 19-track disc featuring a selection of the game's main themes, Persona 5: Sounds of the Rebellion, was released as part of the North American and European collector's edition bundle. The complete soundtrack later received a localized English release on iTunes on April 18, 2017, and on vinyl later that year by iam8bit. In December 2025, the game's score was performed in Japan at the "Persona 5 Special Big Band Concert," and will continue to be performed at the "Persona 5 Special Big Band Concert Asia Tour 2026".

== Release ==
Persona 5 being promoted at the 2017 Taipei Game Show

Persona 5 was first announced with a teaser trailer in November 2013, alongside spin-off games Persona Q: Shadow of the Labyrinth, Persona 4: Dancing All Night, and the PlayStation 3 port of Persona 4 Arena Ultimax. The game was originally announced for a late 2014 release exclusively for the PlayStation 3. During a Sony press conference in September 2014, it was announced that the game would also be released for the PlayStation 4 and that it had been delayed into 2015. According to director Katsura Hashino, the game was delayed to fully develop for the PlayStation 4, and improve the general quality of both versions. The first gameplay trailer was shown during a special livestream on February 5, 2015. The song used in the first gameplay trailer is an instrumental version of the main theme. A Blu-ray Disc containing an exclusive trailer was bundled with first print copies of Persona 4: Dancing All Night in Japan on June 25, 2015. During a special livestream at the 2015 Tokyo Game Show, it was announced that the game would be delayed to late 2016. Speaking in a staff interview, Hashino apologized for the delay and stated that it was necessary to deliver a high-quality product without having to hold back in terms of content.

In April 2016, Atlus launched a countdown that ran until May 5, 2016. Shortly after, a special livestream was announced titled Take Tokyo Tower, which coincided with the countdown date. During the Take Tokyo Tower livestream, a trailer revealed the game's final release date. Persona 5 was released in Japan on September 15, 2016. Along with the standard edition, a 20th Anniversary Edition was released, which features all downloadable content (DLC) based on Persona 3 and Persona 4, a five-CD best-of album set featuring music from all six main games in the series, and the official artbook for the game by Soejima. In honor of the game's Japanese release, the series-focused variety show Persona Stalker Club featured a new programming block titled Persona Stalker Club V. To promote the game in Japan, Atlus partnered with AKG Acoustics to release limited edition wireless headphones based on Futaba's in December 2016. The headphones were packaged in a box with art designed by Soejima, with a music CD featuring two remixed tracks by Meguro and Kozuka. Apparel based on the characters was also released in Japan in early 2018.

Following its release, character costumes and additional Personas were released as paid DLC. The costumes include those incorporated into the 20th Anniversary Edition based on Persona 3 and Persona 4, in addition to new costumes based on Revelations: Persona, the Persona 2 duology (Innocent Sin and Eternal Punishment), Shin Megami Tensei If..., Catherine, Shin Megami Tensei IV, Devil Summoner: Raidou Kuzunoha vs. the Soulless Army, Persona 4 Arena, and Dancing All Night. The costumes are accompanied by arranged battle music from each costume set's respective game, which replaces the default battle theme based on what costume Joker wears. Some of the key Personas from Persona 3 and Persona 4 were released in bundles that include a new design and the original design of each. In addition, PlayStation 4 themes and avatar sets were released based on the central characters of Persona 5. An additional difficulty setting known as "Merciless" was also released as free DLC.

Pre-order bonuses and its initial North American release date of February 14, 2017, was announced a week before E3 2016. Its release in Europe and Australia set for the same date was announced the following August. In November 2016, its release was pushed back two months to April 4. The stated reason was that Atlus wanted the game to be at its highest possible quality. Atlus USA published the game in North America. In Europe and Australia, it was published by Deep Silver. As with previous Persona games, the English localization was handled by Atlus USA and led by Yu Namba. According to Namba, the team began with a "blank slate" when choosing the English voice cast, as it was a new setting for the Persona series. Localizing Persona 5 was described by Namba as a massive project with the largest staff yet dedicated to the series. As project lead, Namba made the final call on issues brought up by the team during the localization process. In English-speaking regions, the "Shin Megami Tensei" moniker was dropped from the title. For the English release, the Japanese dub was made available as free DLC.

Upon its worldwide release, Atlus published a set of guidelines for players livestreaming footage of the game, noting that streamers who shared footage past a certain in-game date "[did] so at the risk of being issued a content ID claim or worse, a channel strike/account suspension". The guidelines were widely perceived as threatening, and were criticized by many in the games press and streaming community. About three weeks later, Atlus apologized for the tone of its original guidelines and revised its policy, extending the amount that could be streamed considerably.

=== Persona 5 Royal ===
Persona 5 Royal, released in Japan as Persona 5: The Royal, is an enhanced version of the game in a similar vein to Persona 4 Golden. This version features an additional Phantom Thief member named Kasumi Yoshizawa, a new Palace, a new area of the city (Kichijōji), new music, additional plot and social elements, a playable third semester, and support for the PlayStation 4 Pro, alongside many other changes and additions. In a first for the series, Royal features subtitles in French, German, Italian, and Spanish. It features a new opening sequence directed by Yuichiro Hayashi and produced by MAPPA, and as with the original game, Domerica co-produced the new anime cutscenes. Atlus first teased the game as Persona 5 R in December 2018, with a full reveal in April 2019. It was released for the PlayStation 4 in Japan on October 31, 2019, and worldwide on March 31, 2020. The game was also released for the Nintendo Switch, PlayStation 5, Windows, Xbox One, and Xbox Series X/S on October 21, 2022. These versions were ported by Atlus owner Sega.

Sega published Royal in Europe and Australia, taking over from Deep Silver who published the original in those regions. Upon release, Royal received numerous character costume sets and Personas as paid DLC. Costumes include those based on Persona 5: Dancing in Starlight and Persona Q2: New Cinema Labyrinth. Additionally, Kasumi received her own costume bundle. Personas added include those from Persona 3 and 4. DLC adding additional battles against the protagonist of Persona 3 and protagonist of Persona 4 was released. All DLC from the original game was also made available as a free download for owners of Persona 5 Royal. The paid DLC created for Royal was included for free in the Nintendo Switch, PlayStation 5, Windows, Xbox One, and Xbox Series X/S versions. The game supports Xbox Play Anywhere on Microsoft platforms, but the PlayStation 5 version does not offer an upgrade path or save data transfer from the PlayStation 4 version.

== Reception ==
Reception

Aggregate scores
Aggregator	Score
Metacritic	PS4: 93/100; Royal; PS4: 95/100; PS5: 91/100; NS: 94/100; XSXS: 94/100; PC: 95/100
OpenCritic	98% recommend

Review scores
Publication	Score
4Players	91/100; 92/100 (Royal)
Destructoid	9/10
Easy Allies	5/5
Edge	8/10
Electronic Gaming Monthly	4/5
Eurogamer	Essential
Famitsu	39/40; 37/40 (Royal)
Game Informer	9.25/10; 9.25/10 (Royal)
GameRevolution	5/5
GameSpot	9/10; 10/10 (Royal)
GamesRadar+	5/5
GamesTM	9.5/10
Hardcore Gamer	4.5/5; 4.5/5 (Royal)
IGN	9.7/10; 10/10 (Royal)
Jeuxvideo.com	18/20 (Royal)
Nintendo Life	10/10 (Royal)
PlayStation Official Magazine – Australia	10/10
PlayStation Official Magazine – UK	10/10; 10/10 (Royal)
Polygon	9/10; Recommends (Royal)
Push Square	10/10; 10/10 (Royal)
RPGamer	5/5; 4.5/5 (Royal)
RPGFan	87/100
The Guardian	5/5
USgamer	5/5

Persona 5 received "universal acclaim" according to review aggregator Metacritic. Famitsu gave it a positive review, with the game garnering a near-perfect score. PlayStation Official Magazine – UK described it as "an unabashed masterpiece". IGN's Andrew Goldfarb said Persona 5 "stands out as an extraordinary, memorable experience and easily one of the deepest JRPGs of the last decade". RPGamer said that "With Persona 5, Atlus has once again proven that it is the master of the modern JRPG. With terrific style, addictive gameplay, and an engaging, thought-provoking story...". The game's graphical style and art direction also received significant praise.

The quality of the English localization was one of the few aspects singled out for criticism, with Polygon describing it as "aggravatingly mediocre". Another was its treatment of LGBTQ topics. Writing for Paste, Kenneth Shepard considered the game to be heteronormative and noted a "lecherous" gay couple who are treated as a joke. These scenes' dialogue were altered in the Western version of Persona 5 Royal, with its localization team advocating for the change. Shepard and Polygon writer Laura Dale both opined that Royal's localization changes were at least a minor improvement, but the game was still broadly uninclusive to LGBTQ identities. There is mixed reception regarding the game's playtime, which writers from The Verge and Wired note may be too long for some players.

=== Royal ===
Persona 5 Royal also received "universal acclaim" from critics, according to review aggregator Metacritic, garnering an even higher score than the original. The game is the third-highest-rated PlayStation 4 game on Metacritic alongside Naughty Dog's The Last of Us Remastered. IGN listed it as one of the best contemporary role-playing games. Famitsu praised Royal's newer elements. Michael Higham of GameSpot lauded the new music, characters, and the added third semester, saying that it solves one of the original game's shortcomings of ending abruptly. He concluded his review saying that Royal refines an already great game and builds on what was best about it with a great new story and that it is "an unforgettable and empowering RPG that should be recognized as one of the best games of our time." IGN's Leana Hafer said Royal is "a living master class in how to take an already amazing game and amp it up to the next level." She commended the improvements to the Mementos dungeons saying "The fact that Atlus has made Mementos feel so much more alive is a massive improvement by itself."

=== Sales ===
The game received a boost to pre-order sales following the delay of Final Fantasy XV, which was originally scheduled to release the same month as Persona 5. Sales went up on Amazon Japan by 450%, bringing it to second place in their best-seller charts behind Tales of Berseria. In its first week of release, the PS4 version reached first place with sales of 264,793 units, while the PS3 version reached second place with 72,974 units, resulting in total sales of 337,767 units. This made Persona 5 the fastest-selling title in the series' history, surpassing Revelations: Persona, and together with Pro Evolution Soccer 2017 pushed sales of the PS4 up significantly over the previous week. It was later reported by Hashino that combined physical shipments and digital sales had reached over 550,000 units by September 2016. Within three weeks of its launch in Japan, the game became Atlus' best-selling game in the country.

Outside of Japan, it was the biggest debut for any Persona game to date, with packaged sales five times better than Persona 4. In the United Kingdom, Persona 5 debuted at number one on the all-formats sales chart, becoming Atlus's first title to top the chart and achieving what GfK Chart-Track described as "by far" the biggest launch for a Persona game in the country. It was also the first Japanese role-playing game to debut at number one in the UK since Ni no Kuni: Wrath of the White Witch in 2013. On the PlayStation Network in April, the game topped the PS4 charts, and was third on the PS3, with Atlus announcing that it had shipped 1.5 million units worldwide. By November 2017, that number had risen to over two million, which made it the best-selling game in the series. The success of Persona 5 contributed to increasing annual revenue for Sega, the owner of Atlus, in 2017. At the 2018 PlayStation Awards, it received the Platinum Prize for topping a million sales in Asia. Persona 5 had sold over 3.2 million units by December 2019.

Persona 5 Royal shipped over 400,000 units in Japan by December 2019. This brought total sales of Persona 5 and Royal to over 3.6 million units worldwide by December 2019. In February 2020, Royal topped the Media Create sales charts in South Korea and Taiwan. In the United Kingdom, Royal debuted at number five on the sales chart. Royal had sold over 1.4 million units by July 2020, bringing the total sales of Persona 5 and Royal to over 4.6 million. Persona 5 and Royal had sold over 5 million units by June 2021 (when including 1.8 million Royal units).

When the game launched on additional platforms in October 2022, the Nintendo Switch version placed in second at 45,998 physical units sold, and PlayStation 5 version placed in seventh at 5,051 units during the week from October 17 to 23, according to Japanese publication Famitsu. In the United Kingdom, the re-release of Royal debuted at number six on the sales chart, with 79% of the launch week sales coming from the Nintendo Switch version. By November 30, 2022, the PlayStation 4 version of Royal had sold 2.3 million units. By April 2023, the ports to other platforms had sold a combined 1.7 million units, bringing total sales of Royal to 4 million units, and combined sales of all versions of Persona 5 to 7.2 million units. The Persona 5 series including Royal, Dancing in Starlight, Strikers, and Tactica surpassed 10 million units sold by December 2023. Royal had sold a total of 8.66 million copies by June 2026, bringing combined sales of all versions of Persona 5 to 11.8 million.

=== Awards ===
Persona 5 won two awards at the Japanese 2016 PlayStation Awards. At The Game Awards 2017, it was nominated for the show's "Game of the Year", "Best Art Direction", "Best Score/Music", and "Best Role Playing Game" awards; it ultimately won for "Best Role Playing Game". It won the Award for Excellence at the Japan Game Awards 2017. It was named the second best game of 2017 by GameSpot, behind The Legend of Zelda: Breath of the Wild. In IGN's 2017 end of year awards, it won "Best RPG", and was also nominated for "Game of the Year", "Best PlayStation 4 Game", "Best Art Direction", "Best Story", and "Best Original Music". The game was also nominated for "Best International Game" at the 2017 Ping Awards, and for the "Best Music" and "Best Style" awards by Giant Bomb. In 2024, a cover of "Last Surprise" by The 8-Bit Big Band was nominated for a Grammy Award for "Best Arrangement, Instruments And Vocals".

It was ranked as one of the best games of 2017 by Eurogamer, Polygon, The Verge, GamesRadar+, and Electronic Gaming Monthly's end of year lists. Destructoid nominated it for "Best PS4 Game" in its 2017 Game of the Year Awards. Staff of Game Informer named it 2017's "Best Role-Playing Game", as well as "Best Narrative" and "Best Cast". In their reader's choice awards, it was voted "Best Role-Playing Game" and came in second for "Best Sony Game" and third for "Game of the Year". During the 21st Annual D.I.C.E. Awards, the Academy of Interactive Arts & Sciences nominated Persona 5 for "Role-Playing Game of the Year". The game won the Tin Pan Alley Award for "Best Music in a Game" at the New York Game Awards 2018. It was also nominated for the "Best Visual Art" award at the Game Developers Choice Awards, and for "Excellence in Musical Score" and "Excellence in Art" at the 2018 SXSW Gaming Awards. The game was nominated for "Best Game Music Cover/Remix" at the 2019 G.A.N.G. Awards.

Persona 5 Royal won the award for "Best Music" at the Famitsu Dengeki Game Awards 2019, where it was also nominated for "Best RPG". It was nominated for "Best Role Playing Game" at The Game Awards 2020, as well as "Role-Playing Game of the Year" at the 24th Annual D.I.C.E. Awards, but lost both awards to Final Fantasy VII Remake.

== Legacy ==
=== Critical retrospectives and accolades ===
Since its release, Persona 5 has been regarded as one of the greatest role-playing games of all time, and one of the greatest games of all time. Writing for Nerdist in 2017, Edwin Garcia opined that the game was "one of the best RPGs of the past few years" and asserted that it "belongs amongst the greatest of all time." Alex Donaldson of VG247 likened the game to other esteemed RPGs such as Chrono Trigger and Final Fantasy VII, and stated that it hearkened back to the genre's golden age. Citing it as "one of the best RPGs in recent memory" in a 2023 Inverse article, critic Willa Rowe claimed Persona 5 was the best heist game, praising the dungeon design's emphasis on heist planning and execution. Journalists noted its influence on games such as Atlus' own Metaphor: ReFantazio (2024) and Sandfall Interactive's Clair Obscur: Expedition 33 (2025). Sandfall's lead director Guillaume Broche and Japanese game designer Masahiro Sakurai both praised the game's stylish UI design as among their favorite.

Persona 5 and Royal have appeared in various critic lists of the best games of all time. IGN included Persona 5 at #78 in its 2019 list of the top 100, and ranked Royal at #81 in their 2021 iteration. The publication also placed it at #50 in their list of the 100 best RPGs. USA Today's gaming section For The Win listed the game at #11, and GQ ranked the game at #64 in a similar list in 2023. A 2017 Famitsu reader poll ranked Persona 5 as the greatest game of all time.

=== Adaptations and media appearances ===
A standalone anime special, Persona 5: the Animation -The Day Breakers-, aired in Japan on September 3, 2016. Created by A-1 Pictures, The Day Breakers is set during the events of the game and portrayed as a "sub event" separate from the main narrative. A manga adaptation of Persona 5 by Hisato Murasaki began serialization online from September 15, 2016. Persona 5: The Animation, an anime television series based on the game's events, was produced by CloverWorks and began broadcast in April 2018. (Note: The anime adaptation was originally credited to A-1 Pictures. However, the credit was transferred to CloverWorks after their separation from the studio in October 2018.) Stage play adaptations under the title Persona 5: The Stage have been performed in Japan, with original music composed by Atsushi Kitajoh.

Persona 5: Dancing in Starlight, a rhythm game for the PlayStation 4 and PlayStation Vita, features the main cast of Persona 5 and was released in 2018. The cast is also featured in Persona Q2: New Cinema Labyrinth for the Nintendo 3DS, also released in 2018. Persona 5 Strikers, an action role-playing sequel to Persona 5 co-developed with Omega Force and featuring gameplay based on their Dynasty Warriors series, was released in Japan in 2020 and worldwide in 2021 for the Nintendo Switch, PlayStation 4, and Windows. A tactical role-playing game spinoff named Persona 5 Tactica was released in 2023. A spin-off for Android and iOS named Persona 5: The Phantom X was announced in 2023, developed by Black Wings Game Studio and published by Perfect World Games; P-Studio is assisting in the game's development. The Phantom Thieves appear as characters that can be summoned via gacha by the player character of Persona 5: The Phantom X.

Joker appears as a playable character via downloadable content (DLC) in the 2018 crossover fighting game, Super Smash Bros. Ultimate. The game's director, Masahiro Sakurai, is a fan of the Persona series and stated that Joker was emblematic of the approach that he wanted to take with Ultimate's DLC, adding that he wanted characters that were unique and fun to use within the Super Smash Bros. environment. Other characters and series elements have also made crossover appearances in various other games. (Note: Elements of Persona 5 have appeared in other titles, including other Sega properties: Sonic Forces; Super Monkey Ball Banana Mania; Sonic Racing: CrossWorlds; Other Atlus titles, including other Persona titles: Catherine: Full Body; Tokyo Mirage Sessions ♯FE; Soul Hackers 2; Persona 3 Reload; Metaphor: ReFantazio; Persona 4 Revival; Other titles: Dragon's Dogma Online; Puzzle & Dragons; Granblue Fantasy; Star Ocean: Anamnesis; Another Eden; Nier Reincarnation; Alchemy Stars; Astro Bot; Overwatch 2; Call of Duty: Mobile; Goddess of Victory: Nikke; Fortnite Battle Royale)
