= Joker (Persona) =

Persona 5 character

- Persona character
- Ren Amamiya (left) and his Phantom Thief alter-ego Joker (right)
- First game: Persona 5 (2016)
- Designed by: Shigenori Soejima
- Portrayed by: Hiroki Ino (stage plays)
- Voiced by: EN: Xander Mobus; JA: Jun Fukuyama

In-universe information
- Nationality: Japanese

Ren Amamiya (Japanese: 雨宮 蓮, Hepburn: Amamiya Ren), codename Joker (ジョーカー, Jōkā), is the protagonist of Persona 5, a 2016 role-playing video game owned by Sega subsidiary Atlus. He is a second-year high school student who is expelled due to being falsely accused of assault by a corrupt politician. As a result, he leaves his hometown and moves in with a family friend in Tokyo to serve a one-year probation. Upon transferring to a new school, he and a group of other students awaken to a supernatural power known as the Persona.

Soon after discovering these powers, they form a vigilante group known as the Phantom Thieves of Hearts with Joker as their leader, as they explore around the Metaverse, a realm consisting of the physical manifestations of humanity's subconscious desires and remove malevolent intent from people to cause a change of heart within them so they can answer for their crimes.

Joker also appears in several of the series' spin-off media, as well as in other cameo appearances such as in the crossover fighting game Super Smash Bros. Ultimate and in the hero shooter Overwatch as a cosmetic skin. He was designed by Persona series artist Shigenori Soejima, and is voiced in Japanese by Jun Fukuyama and in English by Xander Mobus. He has also been portrayed by actor Hiroki Ino in the game's stage adaptation. Despite his canon name, Joker's given name can be customized in the game.

== Development and design ==
Joker is a male teenage character created by artist Shigenori Soejima for the 2016 video game Persona 5. In the game, he is a second-year high school student who is charged with assault by Masayoshi Shido, an influential politician in the cabinet of Japan, after witnessing him harassing a female subordinate. After Shido falls and injures his head due to being intoxicated, he places the blame on Joker and forces his subordinate to testify to police that Joker pushed him. At the court hearing, Joker is told he must serve a one-year probation and transfers to Shujin Academy, a school in Tokyo which will accept him with his current criminal record. Needing a place to stay while there, Sojiro Sakura, an acquaintance of Joker's parents, offers to house him at his café Leblanc.

During his time at Shujin, he and other students awaken to their supernatural powers known as the persona and become a group of vigilantes known as the Phantom Thieves of Hearts. They explore the Metaverse, a supernatural realm consisting of the physical manifestations of humanity's subconscious desires, to change malevolent intent in the hearts of adults. Despite primarily being a silent protagonist, Joker occasionally speaks short phrases during cutscenes and battles; being voiced in Japanese by Jun Fukuyama and in English by Xander Mobus. Fukuyama used two different tones for the character and felt proud of his performance. While the player can freely choose a given name for Joker, his Phantom Thief codename, he is canonically named Ren Amamiya in most appearances. Akira Kurusu is used in the game's manga adaptation. Amamiya was chosen by the anime's producer who thought that the combination of his full name, which means lotus rain palace in Japanese, sounded "quite poetic" together. The producer further stated that remaking Joker's characterization in the anime was challenging, but was ultimately a success.

In the musical theater adaptation, Persona 5 the Stage, the protagonist's name changes every performance. In the version released on Crunchyroll, his name is Itsuki Onda.

Joker is the leader of the Phantom Thieves of Hearts and the only member with access to the Velvet Room, as he holds the "Wild Card", an ability that allows him to hold more than one Persona and fuse them together to create more powerful ones. Joker's primary persona is Arsene, and fights with knives and handguns in addition to his Persona powers. His ultimate persona is Satanael, the Gnostic equivalent of the devil and a deity who can harness the power of the seven deadly sins. Joker's initial Persona was originally the German demon Mephistopheles, but it was changed to Arsène since it better fit the game's themes. The three main inspirations behind Joker were the original Arsène Lupin, The Fiend with Twenty Faces, and Ishikawa Goemon. The first character sketch of him was done in 2012. Soejima worked closely with game director Katsura Hashino to ensure Joker and the rest of the characters could properly reflect the game's themes. Joker has unkempt wavy black hair and dark grey eyes and wears black glasses for most of his casual and school outfits. In the Metaverse, his apparel changes to a stylized black trenchcoat with a masquerade mask and winklepicker shoes, which were described as being designed after Belle Époque fashion.

As the main theme and narrative of Persona 5 revolves around crime and vigilantes triggered by Joker voluntarily choosing that path, Soejima needed to convey this while allowing the character to suit whatever dialogue choices the player decided upon. Due to these difficulties, Joker was given multiple designs in a trial and error process to find the best one. As the "phantom thief" premise was a common stereotype in fiction, Soejima initially drew Joker and the rest of the game's main cast in a style similar to shōnen manga, but these designs were scrapped as they clashed with the series' realistic aesthetics. Soejima likened his design to a black panther, which contrasts with the protagonist of Persona 4, Yu Narukami, being designed around the image of a loyal and sincere dog. He emphasizes the two-sided nature of his design, which ties into the theme of the Phantom Thieves' members living double lives. Despite Joker's uniformed appearance being meant to give off the impression of someone who is kindhearted and loyal to the system, his true nature is free-spirited and rebellious, with him being the type of person who plans things without telling anyone.

== Appearances ==
Joker was introduced in Persona 5 as the game's main playable character and has appeared in the spin-off games Persona 5: Dancing in Starlight, Persona Q2: New Cinema Labyrinth, Persona 5 Strikers, Persona 5 Tactica, and Persona 5: The Phantom X. He is also a playable character in the 2018 crossover fighting game Super Smash Bros. Ultimate, being released as paid downloadable content in April 2019. He has also made appearances in other non-related games, such as Dragon's Dogma Online, Phantasy Star Online 2, Lord of Vermilion Re:3, Sonic Forces, Puzzle & Dragons, Granblue Fantasy, Catherine: Full Body, Star Ocean: Anamnesis, Another Eden, Tokyo Mirage Sessions ♯FE Encore, Soul Hackers 2,, Sonic Racing: CrossWorlds., Eternal Return, and Fortnite. He has also been portrayed by Hiroki Ino in Japanese stage play adaptations of the game. Joker made an appearance as an optional boss battle in Persona 3 Reload: Episode Aigis. Joker appears as a cameo Bot that can be rescued in Astro Bot. Joker appears as one of the guest characters from Persona 5 Royal in Season 6 of Call of Duty: Mobile, titled "Take Your Heart".

== Reception ==
Critical reception to Joker has been positive, with fan art and cosplay of the character being popular. Upon the reveal of Persona 5, Japanese fans nicknamed him "Potter" due to his visual resemblance to Harry Potter, the main character of the Harry Potter franchise. Upon his announcement as a downloadable content (DLC) character in the crossover Nintendo fighting game Super Smash Bros. Ultimate, the game's director Masahiro Sakurai stated that Joker was emblematic of the approach that he wanted to take with its DLC, adding that he wanted characters that were "unique", "different", and "fun" to use within the Super Smash Bros. environment. His appearance in Ultimate was met with praise, with game journalists noting the level of detail and how faithful his transition from Persona 5 was, as well as how enjoyable he was to play as. Anime News Network reviewer Caitlin Moore criticized his relatively silent personality in the anime adaptation. Nevertheless, his relationship with Goro Akechi was praised. Xander Mobus's voice acting was praised by Siliconera.

Various merchandise of Joker, such as figurines and action figures, has also been made. An airsoft gun based on one that he uses in the game was released in Japan in April 2019. His Phantom Thief outfit and a number of related accessories were also released by the Japanese fashion brand SuperGroupies in June 2019. An Amiibo figurine of him was released in October 2020.
