= Spike Spencer =

American voice actor

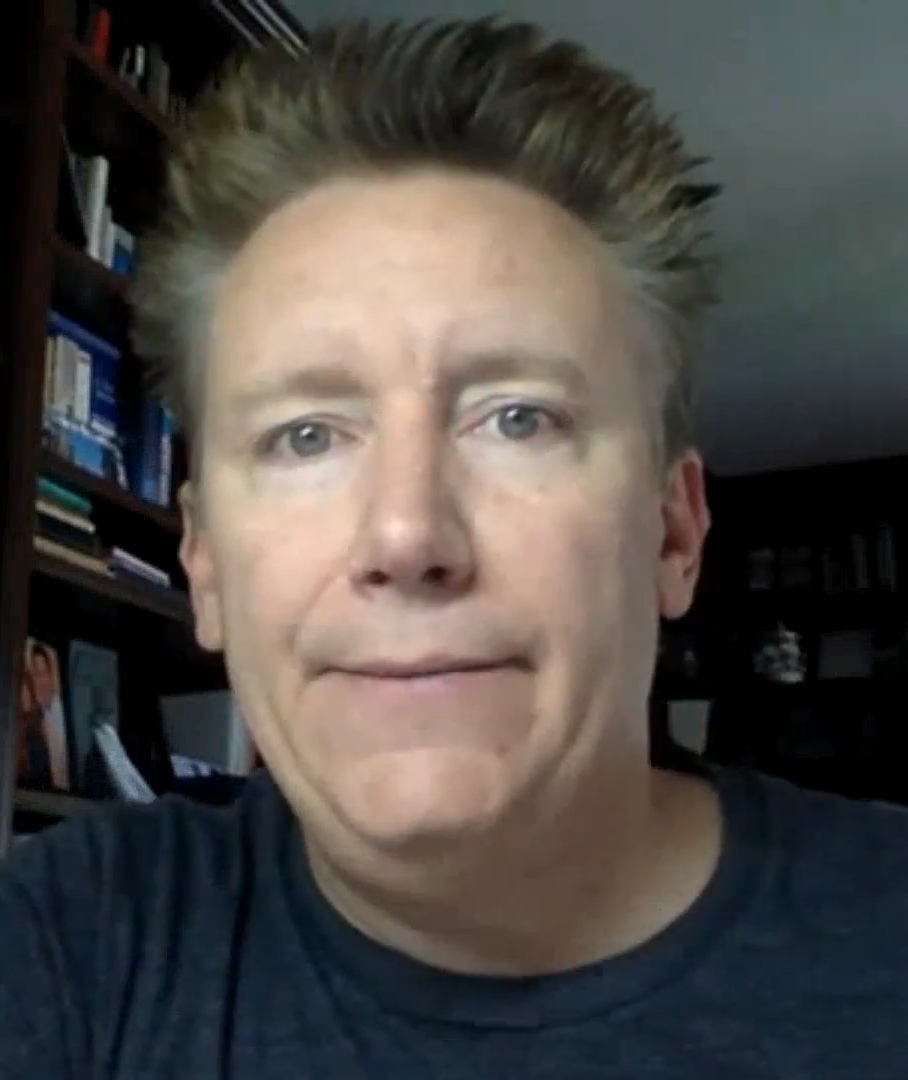
- Spencer in 2019
- Born: Charles Forrest Spencer; December 21, 1968 (age 57)
- Education: University of Houston
- Occupation: Voice actor
- Years active: 1989–present
- Agent: Pastorini-Bosby Talent
- Notable credits: Shinji Ikari in Neon Genesis Evangelion; Akito Tenkawa in Martian Successor Nadesico; Gojo Shioji in Excel Saga; Hanataro Yamada in Bleach; Ginta Toramizu in MÄR; Rolo Lamperouge in Code Geass
- Spouses: Kendra Benham (divorced); Kim MacKenzie (m. 2014)
- Children: 3
- Website: www.spikespencer.com

Charles Forrest "Spike" Spencer (born December 21, 1968) is an American voice actor and columnist best known for dubbing Japanese anime films. He is known for his roles in ADV Films dubs of Neon Genesis Evangelion as Shinji Ikari, Martian Successor Nadesico as Akito Tenkawa, and Excel Saga as Gojo Shioji. He has also performed voice acting for radio, especially commercials. His anime character voices tend to be either for timid, shy, or weak characters, or for eccentric and comical ones.

== Career ==
Spencer attended the University of Houston for four years. After doing several independent films, he met Amanda Winn-Lee, who suggested he audition for anime English dubbing at ADV Films. Spencer first landed a supporting role of Prime Minister Mikoshiba in Super Atragon, then a leading role of Takateru in Suikoden Demon Century. In August 1996, Spencer was cast as the lead role of Shinji Ikari in Neon Genesis Evangelion. After ADV Films' collapse, Funimation acquired the rights to the Rebuild of Evangelion movies. As part of Funimation's goal to get the service of the original voice actors from shows and movies they acquired distributing rights for, Spencer reprised his role as Shinji in the movies.

Spencer has done commercials for Houston Cellular, Applebee's, Kroger, Chevrolet, and Subway, as well as additional acting in live-action films and TV series such as The Big Easy.

Spencer also travels the world with his panel, Don't Kill Your Date (and Other Cooking Tips), which teaches his trademark "food game," giving dating advice for men, cooking tips, and easy dinner recipes. Spencer's dating tips have been featured in USA Today and Men's Health. He also frequently writes dating tips for Neil Strauss, Carlos Xuma, and Singles Warehouse.

== Personal life ==
Spencer was once married to Kendra Benham, who worked alongside him in Neon Genesis Evangelion as Maya Ibuki. Spencer holds a brown belt in aikido and a 2nd-degree black belt in Tae Kwon Do. As of October 4, 2014, Spencer is married to entrepreneur Kim MacKenzie. He is a foodie and has a website called DontKillYourDate.com. Spike and Kim have two sons: Declan, who was born on July 29, 2017, and Colton Christopher, who was born on February 4, 2021, in Australia.

== Filmography ==
=== Anime dubbing ===
Title	Role	Notes	Source
Battle Angel	Yugo		
Black Butler	Snake		
BlazBlue Alter Memory	Arakune		
Bleach	Hanataro Yamada, Di Roy Linker, Jinnai Doko		
Boruto: Naruto Next Generations	Inojin Yamanaka		
Bubblegum Crisis: Tokyo 2040	Mackey Stingray		
Bungo Stray Dogs	Jun'ichirō Tanizaki		
Burn Up W	Jackalhead		
Buso Renkin	Koushaku "Papillon" Chouno		
Code Geass: Lelouch of the Rebellion R2	Rolo Lamperouge		
Colorful	Young T		
Compiler	Toshi Igarashi		
Coppelion	No-sense		
Dirty Pair Flash: Mission Two	Calbee		
Doraemon	Ace Goody (Dekisugi)		
Dragon Ball Super	Majin Buu	Bang Zoom! dub for Toonami Asia	
Dragon Half	Roshi, Slug		
Durarara!!	Saburo Togusa		
Ellica	Funk		
Excel Saga	Dr. Gojo Shioji		
Fire Emblem	Mars Lowell		
Full Metal Panic!	Shoto Sakimoto, Subordinate A, Takuma		
Gantz	Little Green onion alien		
Golden Boy	Maid		
Kekkaishi	Mamezo		
MÄR: Märchen Awakens Romance	Ginta		
Martian Successor Nadesico	Akito Tenkawa		
Megazone 23 Part 3	Bud		
Mobile Suit Gundam Unicorn	Dylan McGuinness		
Neon Genesis Evangelion series	Shinji Ikari	ADV Films dub	
Nura: Rise of the Yokai Clan series	Karasu Tengu		
Orphen	Majic Lin		
Panyo Panyo Di Gi Charat	Actor boy		
Plastic Little	Nichol Hawking		
Pretear	Goh		
Puni Puni Poemy	Ball person 3		
Rebuild of Evangelion	Shinji Ikari		
Saiyuki	Shien, Demon 6		
Sailor Moon: Sailor Stars	Jun Godai, Sailor Sommelier (Ep. 184)		
Sorcerous Stabber Orphen	Majic		
Spriggan	Little Boy		
Steel Angel Kurumi	Manager, scientist, ticket taker, Tow-Tone		
Suikoden Demon Century	Takatoru Sage		
Super Atragon	Mikoshiba		
Vampire Knight series	Takuma Ichijo		
Zetman	Purse Snatcher (Ep. 3), Kai Isono/Crab EVOL (Ep. 4)		

=== Animation ===
Title	Role
Get Blake!	Mitch de la Cuz
Peter Rabbit	Shrew
Space Dogs	Venya
The Grossery Gang	Rocky (second voice), Meathead, Stinky

=== Internet appearances ===
Title	Role
Nostalgia Critic	Himself

=== Film ===
Title	Role
NiNoKuni	Toru Shinozaki
Stand by Me Doraemon	Hidetoshi Dekisugi
Stand by Me Doraemon 2	Hidetoshi Dekisugi

=== Video games ===
Title	Role	Source
Akiba's Trip: Undead & Undressed	Protagonist (Nanashi)	
Ace Combat Infinity	Additional voices	
Armored Core: Verdict Day	Various Pilots, AI	
Ar Tonelico: Melody of Elemia	Jack Hamilton	
Ar Tonelico Qoga: Knell of Ar Ciel	Jack Hamilton	
Atelier Iris 2: The Azoth of Destiny	Felt Blanchimont	
BlazBlue: Calamity Trigger	Arakune	
BlazBlue: Continuum Shift	Arakune	
BlazBlue: Chronophantasma	Arakune	
Bleach: Shattered Blade	Hanataro Yamada	
Bravely Default	Ringabel	
Detective Pikachu	Additional voices	
Dynasty Warriors 7	Guan Suo	
Dynasty Warriors 8: Xtreme Legends	Guan Suo	
League of Legends	Kled, Wukong	
Lunar: Silver Star Harmony	Nall, Eiphel	
The Bureau: XCOM Declassified	Agent Kinney	
Fire Emblem Awakening	Excellus	
Fist of the North Star: Lost Paradise	Additional voices	
Mana Khemia 2: Fall of Alchemy	Puni Jiro	
Nier Gestalt	Tyrann, Gideon (uncredited)	
Nier Replicant ver.1.22474487139...	Tyrann	
One-Punch Man: A Hero Nobody Knows	Additional voices	
Operation Darkness	Additional voices	
Payday 2	Taser	
Persona 5	Psychiatrist	
Puyo Puyo Champions	Maguro Sasaki	
Puyo Puyo Puzzle Pop	Ecolo, Maguro Sasaki, additional voices	
Puyo Puyo Tetris	Maguro Sasaki, Ecolo	
Rune Factory Frontier	Erik, Danny, Kross, Gelwein, Tsubute	
Saints Row: The Third	Mascot, Crazed Fan	
Samurai Warriors 3	Nagamasa Azai	
Shenmue III	Additional voices	
Shin Megami Tensei IV: Apocalypse	Hunter	
Shin Megami Tensei – Devil Summoner: Soul Hackers	Judah Singh, Juggler, Worker	
Shin Megami Tensei: Devil Survivor Overclocked	Atsuro Kihara	
Steambot Chronicles	Vanilla Beans, Basil	
Star Ocean: Second Evolution	Claude C. Kenny	
Story of Seasons: Grand Bazaar	Woofio	
Sushi Striker: The Way of Sushido	General Ausprey	
World of Warcraft: The Burning Crusade	Attumen the Huntsman, Romulo, Mekgineer Steamrigger, Blood Elf Male, Essence of Grief	
World of Warcraft: Wrath of the Lich King	Captain Arnath	
Tales of Berseria	Additional voices	
Tales of Vesperia	Yeager	
Tales of Xillia 2	Additional voices	
The Sky Crawlers: Innocent Aces	Ishitobi, Lautern Unit	
Trauma Center: Under the Knife	Victor Niguel	
Trauma Center: Under the Knife 2	Victor Niguel	
Trauma Center: Second Opinion	Victor Niguel	
Xenoblade Chronicles X	Additional voices	
Yggdra Union	Milanor	
Yo-kai Watch 3	Silver Lining, Zazel, Hungramps, Rongo Swirll	
