= Trauma Center =

A trauma center is a type of hospital that cares for patients with major traumatic injuries.

Trauma Center may also refer to:

- Trauma Center (TV series), a 1983 American medical drama
- Trauma Center (video game series), a series of simulation and visual novel games
  - Trauma Center: Under the Knife, the first entry in the series released in 2005
- Trauma Center (film), a 2019 American action thriller film

== See also ==
- Emergency department
