= Trauma Team =

2010 video game

- North American box art
- Developer: Atlus (Note: Additional development by Media.Vision)
- Publisher: Atlus
- Director: Daisuke Kanada
- Programmer: Takaaki Ikeda
- Artist: Masayuki Doi
- Writer: Teppei Kobayashi
- Composers: Atsushi Kitajoh; Ryota Kozuka; Shoji Meguro
- Series: Trauma Center
- Platform: Wii
- Release: NA: May 18, 2010; JP: June 17, 2010
- Genres: Simulation, visual novel
- Modes: Single-player, multiplayer

Trauma Team (Note: Known in Japan as Hospital.: 6 Doctors (HOSPITAL. 6人の医師, Hosupitaru.: 6-nin no Ishi)) is a 2010 simulation video game developed and published by Atlus for the Wii. It is the fifth and final entry in the Trauma Center series. The narrative of Trauma Team follows six protagonists who operate in different sectors of the medical profession, and their eventual united conflict with a virulent infection dubbed the "Rosalia virus". The gameplay combines medical simulation with visual novel-style storytelling through motion comic cutscenes. The different storylines focus on simplified versions of surgery, emergency medicine, endoscopy, diagnosis, orthopedics and forensic medicine.

Beginning preproduction in late 2007 following the completion of Trauma Center: New Blood, the development team's aim was for Trauma Team to be both a "conglomeration" of the series and something different. The wish for variety after multiple titles with similar gameplay resulted in the different playable medical professions, which each required a dedicated designer. The story was influenced by the 2009 swine flu pandemic, and reduced the usage of supernatural and science fiction elements prominent in earlier entries to create a more grounded narrative.

While it met with low sales, reception was generally positive. Critics praised the narrative's grounded tone, presentation, and greater variety compared to earlier Trauma Center games. Criticism focused on the control and pacing issues of some gameplay modes. A pilot episode for a live-action series of the same name was produced, but the series was not taken up and the pilot received no official release.

== Gameplay ==
The gameplay of Trauma Team is divided between invasive medical procedures such as surgery and endoscopy (above), and dialogue-based diagnosis and forensic medicine (below).

Trauma Team is a video game that combines simulation gameplay with non-interactive visual novel storytelling using fully-voiced motion comic segments. The campaign is split between six medical-themed disciplines; surgery, emergency medicine, endoscopy, diagnosis, orthopedics and forensic medicine. Each of the six main characters have episodic storylines that interweave to form a larger narrative, with a seventh chapter involving all the characters once all six storylines are completed. Across each campaign, players control the action with the Wii Remote and Nunchuk.

Surgery and emergency medicine follow the gameplay pattern of earlier Trauma Center titles, with characters working under pressure to save patients. In the surgery segments, players operate on patients using a variety of tools, including scalpel, antibiotic gel and sutures. Players must perform a number of tasks to complete the operation while keeping vital signs stable. During the emergency medicine segments, the player must treat a number of patients with a basic set of tools while each patient loses health. The types of injuries include surface burns, wounds and broken limbs that must be reset. Tools include cotton pads, splints and scissors to cut clothing and expose wounds.

Endoscopy and orthopedics are also invasive surgical professions, but have different gameplay to surgery and emergency medicine. Endoscopy has players guiding the endoscope through a patient's internal organs and carry out operations on small injuries such as ulcers, located using a radar. Players navigate using the Remote functions to mimic the endoscope's motion, while the Nunchuck is used to steer, move the camera, and select medical tools. Orthopedics, which almost exclusively uses the Remote, has players performing scripted skeletal operations, including bone reconstruction and replacement. Tools are provided depending on the operation, with successful use creating a score chain which continues until a mistake is made or the procedure is paused. Rather than patient vitals, the player has five hearts represented on-screen, depleting when a mistake is made.

Compared to the other professions, diagnosis and forensics play very differently, being based around dialogue-based investigation and deduction with gameplay elements similar to point-and-click games. Diagnosis has players asking patients questions and examining them for symptoms. Between these sections, the player looks over the described victims and medical reports which include X-rays and CT scans to deduce what the patient is suffering from. Forensics sees players investigating crimes, going between the crime scene and the lead character's offices where the body and evidence ranging from clues on the corpse to witness testimony are collected. The player gathers clues represented as cards, with different cards combining to create either new clues or solid evidence. These trigger question-answer segments which can produce further clue cards and evidence.

Two difficulty levels are available from the start, "Intern" and "Resident", with a higher difficulty dubbed "Specialist" are available after the game's completion. Depending on their performance during each chapter, players are ranked and higher ranks unlock new content. The "XS" ranking is only achievable on the post-game "Specialist" difficulty. In addition to single-player, a second player can join in for local cooperative multiplayer during surgical levels; players can either take turns with actions, or work together in real-time.

== Synopsis ==
=== Setting and characters ===
Trauma Team is set in the same fictional universe as the other Trauma Center titles, although there is little to no narrative connection. Most of the game is based in and around Resurgam First Care, a fictional hospital in Portland, Maine which many of the protagonists work at or visit.

The storyline follows six protagonists working at Resurgam. "CR-S01" is an amnesiac prisoner convicted of bioterrorism; due to his surgery skills, he begins working at Resurgam to take years off his sentence. Maria Torres is a bombastic paramedic whose perfectionism and independence has isolated her from her colleagues. Gabriel Cunningham is a diagnostician whose troubled personal life gives him a pessimistic view of humanity, and during the game he is reluctantly partnered with the AI system RONI. Hank Freebird is an idealistic former soldier who changed careers after growing sick of violence, becoming Resurgam's resident orthopedic surgeon. Tomoe Tachibana is an endoscopic surgeon from a wealthy Japanese background, having rebelled against her family's control and moved to America. Naomi Kimishima returns from Trauma Center: Second Opinion; following Second Opinion, she was infected with a fatal disease, which left her with nothing in life but her work as a coroner at the Cumberland Institute of Forensic Medicine, but also granted her the ability to hear a dead person's last words.

=== Plot ===
The story opens with six interweaving plotlines involving the game's six main characters. CR-S01 is called from prison to perform a risky heart operation, done using the authority of Cunningham to save a key politician, and due to its success CR-S01's deal is struck. Naomi's storyline has her investigating multiple cases, alongside her growing relationship with a young girl named Alyssa. During her final case involving a serial bomber, Alyssa is almost killed by a bomb meant for Naomi, killing Alyssa's family. CR-S01 escapes from his observers to save Alyssa, forfeiting his deal. After the case is resolved, Naomi decides to adopt the orphaned Alyssa. Alongside these events, Maria confronts both her difficulty working with others and visions of Rosalia, a girl from her childhood; Tomoe successfully defies the restrictive heritage of her clan and saves her father from a life-threatening condition; Hank juggles his dual life as doctor and masked vigilante, in addition to helping a woman who attempted suicide to rediscover her love of life; and Cunningham struggles with the difficulties of his work and clashes with RONI, ultimately diagnosing his son's emerging Wermer's syndrome.

During each story, the characters notice black bruises on patients' bodies, often associated with other severe medical issues. With Naomi, the bruises are found on the bodies of people who displayed erratic or insane behavior. The name "Rosalia" also arises in connection with multiple cases. Ultimately there is a mass outbreak of the disease causing the black bruises, eventually diagnosed as a new virulent strain of viral hemorrhagic fever in the Filoviridae virus family. Resurgam is flooded with patients, and a quarantine is established. Cunningham, who diagnoses a patient suffering from the fever, retrieves a skeleton that carries the live infection. The skeleton is the remains of Albert Sartre, a medical professor and CR-S01's adoptive father, who was responsible for the crime CR-S01 was imprisoned for and disappeared shortly afterwards. With his memory returning, CR-S01 escapes captivity and goes with Maria to uncover more information, coming across a photograph of his adopted sister Rosalia Rossellini, later revealed to be the virus's natural host. The virus—dubbed the "Rosalia virus"—could have been a cure-all due to its ability to destroy other harmful organisms, but was too virulent and attacked any infected organism. If left untreated, the virus will wipe out the USA within a week.

As all the characters come together at Resurgam, they deduce Rosalia's location in Mexico and Naomi flies down there with Maria. They find Rosalia's corpse, now turned into adipocere, in a field of Asclepias flowers near her house. Naomi uncovers that Sartre attempted to create a panacea from the virus, but was infected himself and killed Rosalia in an insane attempt to stop it spreading. Her blood seeped into the surrounding Asclepias, with the monarch butterflies feeding on them becoming the virus's vector due to shedding their scales during their yearly migration. While Rosalia's blood is unusable, an antiserum is developed using the infected Asclepias. They return to Resurgam and the doctors bring the epidemic under control. Naomi then collapses; she is infected with Rosalia, which has merged with her own condition to form a mutant strain. CR-S01 successfully destroys the infection, which in turn eradicates Naomi's condition.

== Development ==
Preproduction of Trauma Team began in 2007, following the completion of Trauma Center: New Blood. The concept was to create a gameplay experience unlike anything in the series. After much discussion, the team opted to combine a wide variety of medical practises into a single game. While director Daisuke Kanada himself described the concept as "pretty farfetched", the team felt Atlus were the ones best suited to successfully turning the concept into a game. While initially planned as a sequel to the other Trauma Center titles, it was decided to change the title from the beginning of development, and by its completion the title had changed substantially from previous entries so that Kanada compared it more to an original title. The new Japanese title Hospital referenced the increased number of represented medical procedures. Kanada defined the game as a "conglomeration" of the series up to that point.

The decision to include so many medical professions was influenced by perceived fatigue with players experiencing only surgery in previous entries. Each gameplay style had a different planner and programmer due to the radically different gameplay designs, with Kanada supervising them all. Kanada also felt that the limited perspective on medical professions of earlier Trauma Center titles on surgery, with the additional professions showing other ways medical practitioners helped people. Each of the concepts were designed around the functions of the Wii. The first two decided upon were surgery and forensic medicine, described by Kanada as being opposite ends of the medical spectrum. After that, the team included endoscopy, diagnosis, orthopedics and emergency medicine. The forensics segments were included partly at the request of Atlus USA and partly due to popularity in North America of forensic crime dramas. The design team examined earlier Trauma Center games for what could stay or needed to be changed. Discarded elements included the often-strict victory conditions and lack of clarity about loss conditions. Supernatural and science fiction elements present in earlier titles, such as the Healing Touch, were removed or downplayed to promote greater realism.

The gameplay of surgery was refined from earlier Wii entries, in addition to its difficulty being lowered. Emergency medicine was tricky to design so it would be "compelling" for players, with the staff suggesting elements based on drama series which showed the profession; a successful suggestion was CPR. Endoscopy was suggested to the team by a real doctor who had played New Blood and asked whether the feature could be included. It was the only part of the game that was in full 3D. The easier difficulty of Orthopedics was designed to contrast other surgical game modes. For Diagnosis, the team had to conduct extensive research to make the gameplay fun. All the CT scans, X-rays, MRIs and ultrasound clips were real, provided by staff members. Forensic medicine, inspired by the team's liking of crime dramas, focused on investigation over autopsies at the suggestion of Atlus USA. The card fusion elements were directly inspired by the Demon Fusion of Atlus's Megami Tensei series.

Due to a greater focus on action, programmer Takaaki Ikeda used programming modified from the script engine of Shin Megami Tensei: Nocturne. The adventure-style gameplay of Cunningham and Kimishima's chapters were the most difficult due to Ikeda's inexperience with the genre. The game originally took up too much disc space and had overly long load times. This was due to each individual asset of the game using a separate programming file, a common issue in development magnified by the sheer number of files. The file number was double that of New Blood, which would have required the game to ship on two discs without additional modifications. Ikeda remembered the efforts to fit the game onto a single disc as one of the most difficult parts of the programming stages. These issues were compounded by Kanada's insistence that the game run at 60 frames per second.

=== Scenario and art design ===
The scenario was written by Teppei Kobayashi, who was working on the scenario of Etrian Odyssey II. Kanada approached him and asked for "a tear-jerking story with [six] doctors as the main characters". A recurring difficulty with the scenario was the number of technical terms he had to employ, with a cited example being his ignorance about the similar-sounding terms apoptosis and necrosis. At the same time, he had to make the story and medicine comprehensible to as wide an audience as possible. He also had to be careful with how he portrayed the conflict, as the characters' "fight" with illness could potentially be interpreted negatively when coupled with their role in saving lives. During 2009 when the game was in the middle of development, the swine flu pandemic of that year occurred and dominated the news. In response, Kobayashi revised the story to emphasise how people live their lives in a world that could have such terrible life-threatening events in it. To prevent the narrative from becoming dull, the team kept the number of characters that appeared in scenarios as low as possible. The character personalities were designed to play off and compliment each other.

Kobayashi combined the Japanese style of "unusual" settings with the more Western focus on characters' struggles. The main challenge with the six-part scenario structure was retaining a sense of unity within the story despite changing perspectives, and the ability for players to begin with and switch between any scenario. CR-S01 was created to stand out from the other surgeon characters featured in the Trauma Center series up to that point. The six professions were picked as Kanada thought that they could be believably involved in a viral outbreak. Originally Kimishima was intended to be a veterinarian. A remnant of this initial plan appears when Kimishima treats a cat during her narrative. A concept Kanada had to abandon was the lead doctor being openly gay; while appearing masculine, he would have a more feminine personality like a "strong elder sister", an archetype common in Japanese entertainment in addition to anime and manga. While Japan had little problem with such characters, both his own research and consultation with Atlus USA made Kanada feel North American gamers might be offended. There was a large amount of dialogue, with a total of 15,000 voiced lines; this was estimated as being greater than most RPGs of the time.

The character and art design were handled by Masayuki Doi, who had worked on the series since Second Opinion. Once the six medical professions were decided upon, Kanada said there should be six unique protagonists. Each character had a different inspiration. Doi drew CR-S01 based on the scenario team's concept for the character, designing him as a quiet loner with an "arresting" air. Kimishima was designed with a cold look referencing her short life expectancy, with her black clothing deliberately referencing her appearance in Second Opinion. Hank was designed to evoke classic American action heroes; inspirations for his design included sentai series such as Kamen Rider, Elvis Presley and unspecified comic book superheroes. His Native American influence was much stronger in earlier designs, but elements of it were retained due to positive staff feedback. Tomoe always wore traditional Japanese dress style, her face being a more traditional Japanese beauty came later. Cunningham was given a stylised adult air, combining both American and British adult male fashion styles. Maria went through multiple redrafts, until Doi settled on making her an energetic archetype to balance against the calm Kimishima and innocent Tomoe. A problem with character designs was the multi-ethnic casts more common in Western stories than Japanese, in addition to aspects of ethnic and gender equality not often presented in Japanese media. The Japanese version's logo design incorporated flowers and butterflies, tying into the game's narrative.

The presentation, including cutscenes and UI, was co-created by Doi and designer Naoya Maeda. Describing the art design, Doi called it a conscious move away from the color schemes of contemporaneous games, which seemed to favour a greyed or washed-out palette. The game used strong and contrasting primary colors, also opting to contrast the 2D cutscenes against 3D surgery segments. With that decided, Maeda had to craft the gameplay graphics to communicate the operation without being "gross" or "painful". Doi attributed the success to the high number of female staff members working on the game. Kanada requested a storytelling style unseen in the series, so Maeda designed the cutscenes as motion comics, with the camera panning over static and moving 2D images to create a 3D illusion. They tested this style by rendering a story sequence from New Blood in this way, opting for it after positive feedback. Doi asked Maeda to use high contrast colors to highlight different internal organs during gameplay. Due to the different professions, each mode had different organ and body designs fitting their gameplay styles and themes. Their art design was also made less realistic than in earlier Trauma Center titles. Japanese studio Media.Vision helped create the background art.

=== Audio ===
The music was primarily composed by Atsushi Kitajoh, a veteran of New Blood, and newcomer Ryota Kozuka. Further tracks were contributed by Shoji Meguro, an established Atlus composer who worked on Trauma Center: Under the Knife. Some of the music was remixed from earlier Trauma Center themes created by Kenichi Kikkawa. Due to the variety of the game's cast and the wish to avoid repetition of themes, Kitajoh divided the work between himself and Kozuka. This variety was expressed through different lead instruments, such as a guitar for surgery segments, jazz elements for the diagnosis chapters, and Japanese instruments for the endoscope sections. Including one-off cues and short jingles, the music came to over 100 tracks.

Cutscene tracks were difficult as they needed to sync with specific events. To create tracks, the composers drew inspiration from Doi's early character drafts and watched prototype cutscenes. To mirror the changing gameplay flow, the team was asked by Kanada to create different versions of one track that changed in intensity similar to classic games he played in his youth. The team's main challenge was syncing them in-game so each version would lead into one another depending on the situation. The group also handled general sound design, with one particular instance being overcoming technical problems with the stethoscope function during diagnosis chapters, which were hampered by the Wii Remote's limited sound output.

The vocal theme "Gonna Be Here" was composed by Kitajoh, with lyrics by Kobayashi and Atlus sound staff member Benjamin Franklin. Franklin, a frequent collaborator with the Atlus team on their earlier soundtracks, also sang the theme. Kitajoh decided upon a vocal ending theme with English lyrics, which fitted in with the project goal of doing something different. When Kitajoh saw the game in progress, he did not think a female singer would fit, instead wanting a male hard rock sound. The lyrics were written based on the game's themes. A two-disc soundtrack album was published by 5pb. Records on September 23, 2010. The soundtrack was released digitally on streaming platforms in December 2025, the series 20th anniversary, alongside the other series titles.

== Release ==
The game was first announced under its Japanese title Hospital.: 6 Doctors in a late May issue of Famitsu. At the time, Kanada said that development was 30% complete. It was announced for a North American release two days later, with a trailer being released at the 2009 Electronic Entertainment Expo. Outside Japan, the game was titled "Trauma Team", more clearly showing its relation to the Trauma Center series. Previously scheduled for a North American release in April, the date was later delayed to May 18, 2010. The Japanese release, originally scheduled for May, was similarly delayed to June 17 of the same year. In the first run of copies in Japan, Atlus included cards with character art on them. A guidebook, which also included artwork from the game, was published by Enterbrain on July 30, 2010. Trauma Team was not released in Europe.

The game was later re-released for download on Wii U in 2015 via Nintendo eShop; it released on August 19 in Japan and December 3 in North America. Trauma Team was the first third-party Wii title to be re-released on the Wii U eShop in North America. The game was incompatible with the Wii U's Off-TV Play option, and requires the original Wii controls to play. The game is the fifth and to date final game in the Trauma Center series, and the third developed for the Wii. During an interview regarding Shin Megami Tensei IV (2013), Doi stated his wish to work on another series entry, but was committed to working on the Megami Tensei series.

The English and Japanese voice tracks were produced at the same time alongside the game's production. Kanada wanted to include the English and Japanese voices in both releases, but disc space restrictions meant the idea had to be abandoned. The game's marketing created troubles inherent to the Trauma Center series as a whole with portraying its gameplay, and presented new challenges due to the wider range of medical professions represented. In Japan, the video marketing focused on the game's narrative, while in North America the focus was on the different gameplay styles. The cover art was also different; the Japanese version was very colourful, while North America used a plainer cover art similar to earlier Trauma Center titles. Between its announcement and release, Atlus USA were able to turn comments from the developers and other staff into featurettes. Due to its greater story and character emphasis, the team had to translate a large amount of text and cast numerous actors. The localization was led by Yu Namba, with the script edited by Mike Meeker. The English voice work was recorded at PCB Productions, which had worked on the Trauma Center series since the first Trauma Center.

=== Television pilot ===
Prior to the game's release, an American live-action television pilot based on the game was produced by Instavision/1212 Entertainment, Atlus and INdiGO, a joint venture between Atlus' then-parent company Index Holdings and Japanese animation studio Gonzo. The series was pitched as a grounded hour-long medical drama consisting of a 13-episode first season at a budget of $1 million per episode. The pilot was shot in Los Angeles in early 2010 and starred Brandon Quinn, Eden Riegel, Jackson Davis and Julie Mond as a group of medical students who perform illegal surgeries for patients unable to afford proper treatment. It was presented to potential investors at the 2010 MIPCOM tradeshow, but did not go to a series. In late 2016, the pilot was leaked online.

== Reception ==
Reception

Aggregate scores
Aggregator	Score
GameRankings	80.67% (Note: Based on 32 reviews)
Metacritic	82 (29 reviews)

Review scores
Publication	Score
1Up.com	B
Eurogamer	9/10
Famitsu	33/40
G4	3/5
Game Informer	8/10
GamePro	4/5
GameSpot	8/10
GamesRadar+	4/5
GameTrailers	8.3/10
IGN	7.5/10
Nintendo World Report	9/10

Upon its debut week in Japan, Trauma Team failed to reach the top 10 best-selling titles, coming in at 19th place. By the end of the year, the game had sold over 16,700 units, selling through just under 60% of its stock. In their fiscal summary of the period when Trauma Team released, Index Holdings did not include the game among their commercially successful titles at the time, which included Persona 3 Portable and Demon's Souls. Review aggregate Metacritic indicated that it received "generally positive" reviews, and it was considered among the best Wii games by Kotaku, GameZone, and Nintendo World Report.

The narrative was seen as generally enjoyable and more grounded than earlier entries despite still having some outlandish elements, and some noted poor pacing in the cutscenes. Writing for Kotaku, Stephen Totilo enjoyed how the narrative was structured, praising it as a rare example of non-linear storytelling in video games. Surgery was noted as a polished version of the series' previously established gameplay. Nintendo Power writer Chris Hoffman enjoyed the other modes of play, but found the surgical gameplay to be the highlight of the game. He nevertheless felt that it was "more than the sum of its own parts", and that the variety and "excellent narrative" helped make the game compelling. The faster pace of emergency medicine was seen as a pleasant change while carrying over mechanics from surgery. Endoscopy saw a mixed response, as several critics found its controls awkward. Orthopedics was seen as enjoyable and a change of pace from the other modes. Diagnosis met with mixed reactions due to its unconventional approach. The forensics sections were praised for their innovative style and entertaining progress. Several noted Diagnosis and Forensics had pacing issues or grew repetitive. The controls were generally lauded for their implementation. The graphics also met with general praise.

Japanese magazine Famitsu praised the additional gameplay modes and motion comic style, though one reviewer found the switching between screens in some modes disorienting. 1Up.com's Ray Barnholt enjoyed his time with Trauma Team, and said he would enjoy a sequel if one were developed. Chris Schilling of Eurogamer lauded the new direction the game had taken, saying it was a refreshing change for the series. G4's Alexandra Hall called it "a decent game that's held back by its weaker elements" in story and gameplay pacing. Brian Vore of Game Informer enjoyed the greater realism and added modes compared to earlier entries. GamePro's Stewart Shearer disliked the stories and faulted the gameplay for uneven difficulty, but overall found it an enjoyable addition to the series.

Chris Watters of GameSpot summarised the game with an overall positive view: "Though the characters and the activities have their flaws, the whole comes together impressively, making Trauma Team a great bet no matter what your specialty is." GamesRadar's Andrew Hayward noted a lack of tension and faulted the forensic and endoscopy gameplay, but overall found the game enjoyable and praised its narrative and graphics over previous entries. GameTrailers enjoyed the ability to switch between gameplay modes, and praised the title as a positive step forward for the series. Ryan Clements, reviewing for IGN, most enjoyed the surgery and emergency sections, but felt that the overall gameplay experience was mixed due to uneven implementation and pacing. Nintendo World Report's Neal Ronaghan called it the most accessible title in the Trauma Center series to date, praising its gameplay and calling it one of the best titles released for the Wii. Video Game Music Online writer Chris Greening believed that the Trauma Team soundtrack was the best in the series, praising the composers for creating memorable songs in a soundtrack larger than prior entries. He was critical of the soundtrack for being occasionally repetitious, but felt that these downsides did not outweigh the upsides.
