= Class system (disambiguation) =

A class system is a hierarchical stratification of societies.

It may also refer to:

- Character class, a role-playing game concept
- Job system, a video game mechanic
