= Katsura Hashino =

Japanese video game director and producer

- 橋野 桂
- Occupations: Game director; producer
- Years active: 1994–present
- Employer: Atlus
- Known for: Megami Tensei series; Persona series; Catherine; Metaphor: ReFantazio
- Title: Founder, Studio Zero

Katsura Hashino (Japanese: 橋野 桂, Hepburn: Hashino Katsura) is a Japanese video game director and producer, best known for working on the Persona role-playing game series by Atlus. From 2006 to 2016, Hashino served as director of P-Studio, an internal team at Atlus that developed the Persona series. Following the release of Persona 5 (2016), Hashino departed P-Studio to establish Studio Zero, another development team at Atlus focused on the creation of a new IP.

== Career ==
Hashino made his directorial debut with Maken X (1999). He has since directed or produced several games in the Megami Tensei and Persona series. In addition to Persona, Hashino directed and produced on Catherine (2011). Hashino formed a new internal division at Atlus in 2017 called Studio Zero, with their first release being a port of Catherine with additional content, Catherine: Full Body (2019). The studio's first original game is the fantasy role-playing Metaphor: ReFantazio (2024).

== Works ==
Year	Title	Role
1994	Shin Megami Tensei If...	Game design
1995	Shin Megami Tensei: Devil Summoner	Game design
1997	Devil Summoner: Soul Hackers	Game design
1999	Maken X	Director
2001	Maken Shao: Demon Sword	Director
2003	Shin Megami Tensei III: Nocturne	Director, supervisor
2004	Shin Megami Tensei: Digital Devil Saga	Planning director, producer
2005	Shin Megami Tensei: Digital Devil Saga 2	Producer
2005	Trauma Center: Under the Knife	Original plot, producer
2006	Devil Summoner: Raidou Kuzunoha vs. the Soulless Army	Producer
2006	Persona 3	Director, producer
2006	Trauma Center: Second Opinion	Producer
2007	Etrian Odyssey	Special advisor
2007	Persona 3 FES	Director, producer
2007	Trauma Center: New Blood	Development manager
2008	Etrian Odyssey II	Special advisor
2008	Trauma Center: Under the Knife 2	Development manager
2008	Persona 4	Director, producer
2008	Devil Summoner 2: Raidou Kuzunoha vs. King Abaddon	Supervisor
2009	Persona 3 Portable	Producer
2011	Catherine	Director, producer, lyrics
2011	Persona 4 Golden	Original story, game design, creative producer
2012	Persona 4 Arena	Game design, creative producer
2013	Dragon's Crown	General producer
2013	Persona 4 Arena Ultimax	Game design, producer
2014	Persona Q: Shadow of the Labyrinth	Producer
2015	Persona 4: Dancing All Night	Producer
2016	Odin Sphere: Leifthrasir	General producer
2016	Persona 5	Director, producer
2018	Dragon's Crown Pro	General producer
2019	Catherine: Full Body	Producer
2019	13 Sentinels: Aegis Rim	Development support
2024	Metaphor: ReFantazio	Director, creative producer, original story concept
