= Shoji Meguro =

Japanese musician and game designer (born 1971)

- 目黒 将司
- Born: June 4, 1971 (age 55); Tokyo, Japan
- Education: Nihon University
- Occupations: Composer; guitarist; video game designer
- Years active: 1996–present
- Employer: Atlus (1995–2021)
- Musical career
- Genres: Rock; electronic; hip hop; jazz; classical; J-pop
- Instruments: Electric guitar; piano

Shoji Meguro (目黒 将司, Meguro Shōji; born June 4, 1971) is a Japanese composer, guitarist, and video game designer. Formerly an employee of the game company Atlus, he is best known for his work in their Shin Megami Tensei and Persona series. His music spans several genres, such as rock, electronic, J-pop, jazz, and symphonic. Meguro has also designed indie games and was the creative director of the PlayStation Portable remakes of Persona and the Persona 2 duology.

== Career ==
=== Early life ===
Meguro was born on June 4, 1971, in Tokyo, Japan. He became familiar with technology from a young age due to his parents running a factory. As a child, Meguro did not take an interest in popular music, and instead listened to and enjoyed classical. In junior high, he became interested in the likes of jazz artists such as T-Square, Herb Alpert, and Casiopea. It was in junior high that he became particularly fond of writing and profiteering music. He then majored in hydrodynamics at the College of Industrial Technology at Nihon University.

=== Atlus ===
After sending a demo tape and attending two interviews, Meguro was hired by Atlus in 1995. He got his start in the company by working on Revelations: Persona for the PlayStation, for which he composed 16 tracks, including one that became a staple in the series: "Aria of the Soul". Meguro continued to work on several projects in the mid to late 1990s, including Devil Summoner: Soul Hackers on the Sega Saturn, composing around 50 pieces for the game, as well as Maken X on the Dreamcast.

The first time he became a leading composer was on Shin Megami Tensei: Nocturne in 2003, where he somewhat diverged from the music in the prior games for the Megami Tensei series, giving the game a more orchestral and fusion sound. A crucial point of his career was Digital Devil Saga; he had creative freedom that let him establish his own sound. Meguro also worked on series such as Trauma Center in the mid 2000s.

Meguro's career was propelled to international stardom in his craft with his work on Persona 3, where he used a pop-based vocal style, and the soundtrack to the game sold over 100,000 copies. In 2008, Meguro continued upon his success with Persona 4, where he blended genres to craft a unique sound. A concert at Akasaka Blitz was held to celebrate Meguro's work on the Persona series, where Persona favorites were played. During this time, he also worked on the music for Devil Summoner: Raidou Kuzunoha vs. the Soulless Army and Raidou Kuzunoha vs. King Abaddon.

Meguro was promoted to game director for the PlayStation Portable remake of Persona. During this time he received some criticism from some fans for changing the soundtrack for the remake, but overall received a warm response. He later directed the PSP ports of both Persona 2: Innocent Sin and Eternal Punishment. In the mid-2010s, Meguro served as the sound director for three spin-off Persona titles, as well as composing and producing the majority of the soundtrack for Persona 5. Meguro also contributed to the film Mint and Persona 5 Royal. He also served as the lead composer for Persona 5: The Animation, arranging various tracks from the original game in addition to writing new material.

Meguro announced his departure from Atlus in October 2021, choosing to become a freelancer while still being contracted to work on some Atlus projects. His first announced project after leaving was Guns Undarkness, an indie game which he designed and composed music for. He later launched a Kickstarter campaign to help crowdfund the game, with it expected to be released on PC and consoles. Meguro also served as the composer on Metaphor: ReFantazio, a game made by other former Persona staff members.

== Musical style and influences ==
Although many of his works feature a signature rock style, Meguro experiments with different musical genres, such as orchestral, electronica, jazz, and hip hop on various projects. Meguro cites video game composers Koichi Sugiyama, Hiroshi Kawaguchi, and Takenobu Mitsuyoshi, as well as T-Square, Casiopea, Beethoven, and Tchaikovsky as some of his musical influences. Regarding the use of English lyrics in many of the Persona games, Meguro stated that due to Japanese people not fully understanding the language, it helped create music that was not as distracting to them as Japanese would be.

== Works ==
Video games
Year	Title	Role(s)
1996	Revelations: Persona	Music with Hidehito Aoki, Kenichi Tsuchiya, and Misaki Okibe
1996	Yusha: Heaven's Gate	Sound with Kenichi Tsuchiya, Toshiko Tasaki, and Misaki Okibe
1997	Devil Summoner: Soul Hackers	Music with Toshiko Tasaki and Tsukasa Masuko
1999	Maken X	Music with Takahiro Ogata
2001	Maken Shao: Demon Sword	Music
2003	Shin Megami Tensei III: Nocturne	Music with Kenichi Tsuchiya and Toshiko Tasaki
2004	Digital Devil Saga	Music with Kenichi Tsuchiya
2005	Digital Devil Saga 2	Music
2005	Trauma Center: Under the Knife	Music with Kenichi Tsuchiya and Kenichi Kikkawa
2006	Devil Summoner: Raidou Kuzunoha vs. the Soulless Army	Music
2006	Persona 3	Music
2006	Trauma Center: Second Opinion	Sound director
2007	Shin Megami Tensei: Imagine	Opening theme
2007	Persona 3 FES	Music
2008	Persona 4	Music
2008	Devil Summoner 2: Raidou Kuzunoha vs. King Abaddon	Music
2009	Shin Megami Tensei: Persona	Game director; opening and ending themes; arrangements
2009	Shin Megami Tensei: Strange Journey	Music
2009	Persona 3 Portable	Music
2010	Trauma Team	Music with Atsushi Kitajoh and Ryota Kozuka
2011	Catherine	Music with Atsushi Kitajoh and Kenichi Tsuchiya
2011	Persona 2: Innocent Sin	Game director; opening theme
2012	Persona 4 Arena	Music with Atsushi Kitajoh
2012	Persona 2: Eternal Punishment	Game director
2012	Persona 4 Golden	Music with Atsushi Kitajoh
2013	Persona 4 Arena Ultimax	Sound director
2014	Persona Q: Shadow of the Labyrinth	Sound director
2015	Devil Survivor 2: Record Breaker	Music
2015	Persona 4: Dancing All Night	Sound director
2016	Persona 5	Music
2017	Shin Megami Tensei: Strange Journey Redux	Music with Toshiki Konishi
2018	Persona 3: Dancing in Moonlight	Sound director
2018	Persona 5: Dancing in Starlight	Sound director
2018	Persona Q2: New Cinema Labyrinth	Sound director
2019	Persona 5 Royal	Music with Toshiki Konishi
2020	Persona 5 Strikers	Sound director
2024	Persona 3 Reload	Arrangements with Atsushi Kitajoh
2024	Metaphor: ReFantazio	Music with Atsushi Kitajoh and Toshiki Konishi
2026	Denshattack!	"Set for Destruction"
2026	Guns Undarkness	Game design; music
2027	Project Mix	Guest composer

Anime
Year	Title	Notes
2011	Persona 4: The Animation	Music
2013	Persona 3 The Movie: #1 Spring of Birth	Music
2014	Persona 3 The Movie: #2 Midsummer Knight's Dream	"Fate is In Our Hands"
2014	Persona 4: The Golden Animation	Music with Tetsuya Kobayashi
2015	Persona 3 The Movie: #3 Falling Down	Music with Tetsuya Kobayashi
2016	Persona 3 The Movie: #4 Winter of Rebirth	"My Testimony"
2016	Persona 5: The Animation – The Day Breakers	Music
2018	Persona 5: The Animation	Music
