= Trauma Center: Under the Knife 2 =

2008 video game

- Developer: Vanguard
- Publisher: Atlus
- Directors: Daisuke Kanada; Hirokazu Toyama
- Artist: Masayuki Doi
- Writer: Satoru Taniguchi
- Composers: Manabu Namiki; Noriyuki Kamikura
- Series: Trauma Center
- Platform: Nintendo DS
- Release: NA: July 1, 2008; JP: August 7, 2008
- Genres: Simulation, visual novel
- Mode: Single-player

Trauma Center: Under the Knife 2 (Note: Known in Japan as Kyūkyū Kyūmei Kadukeusu 2 (救急救命 カドゥケウス2; lit. Medical Emergency: Caduceus 2)) is a 2008 simulation video game developed by Vanguard for the Nintendo DS (DS), and published by Atlus. It is the fourth game in the Trauma Center series and a direct sequel to Trauma Center: Under the Knife (2005). Set three years after the events of Under the Knife, the plot follows protagonist Derek Stiles as he confronts not only the revival of terrorist organisation Delphi and its GUILT disease, but personal insecurities and corporate manipulation. The gameplay combines surgical simulation relying on the DS's touchscreen controls with a story told as a visual novel.

Under the Knife 2 was developed as a true mechanical and narrative sequel to the original game, using the same controls and gameplay style in contrast to the altered style of other games on the Wii. Daisuke Kanada and Masayuki Doi returned as director and character designer, alongside new co-director Hirokazu Toyama and composers Manabu Namiki and Noriyuki Kamikura. Reception of the game was generally positive, but many journalists noted a lack of innovation while praising its improvements over the original game. It also met with low sales in Japan and North America.

== Gameplay ==
The player conducts the operation on the touch screen, while the top screen displays the score, time limit, and information from the nurse.

Trauma Center: Under the Knife 2 is a video game that combines surgical simulation gameplay with storytelling using non-interactive visual novel-style cutscenes using static scenes, character portraits, and text with rare voice clips. The top screen of the Nintendo DS (DS) is dedicated to story sequences and level statistics displayed as 2D artwork, while the bottom touch screen is dedicated to the operations themselves rendered using 3D models. Players take on the role of protagonist Derek Stiles, a young surgeon with a mystical ability called the Healing Touch. Each operation tasks players with curing the patient of one or multiple ailments within a time limit. Missions can be played on different difficulty settings, ranging from "Easy" to "Hard".

The ten available surgical tools—which range from a scalpel and a laser to ultrasound and a defibrillator to revive a patient whose vitals flatline—are required for different operations and injuries, selected using icons along the edges of the touch screen and manipulated using the DS stylus. The player heals both surface wounds and internal injuries with the tools available, treats minor injuries and incision areas with antibiotic gel, and is aided through their operation with different kinds of serum which can be injected to aid in certain operations. Several operations have Stiles working to destroy strains of an artificial virus called GUILT in boss battle-style operations. While several strains return from the first game, new variants also appear which require different procedures.

While multiple operation types are carried over from Trauma Center: Under the Knife, different operations such as skin grafts and bone repair are included from later entries in the series. As with earlier entries, Stiles can use his Healing Touch to slow time for a short period, allowing him to treat wounds at a rapid speed. The operation is failed if the time limit runs out, or the patient's health drops to zero. After each surgery, the player is ranked on their performance. Once the game is completed, a new difficulty and challenge missions are unlocked for the player.

== Synopsis ==
The game is set three years after the events of Under the Knife when Doctor Derek Stiles of Caduceus eradicated a man-made disease called GUILT created by the Delphi terrorist group. Stiles and his nurse Angie Thompson provide aid to the war-ravaged African nation of Costigar, befriending local doctor Adel Tulba. During his time there, Stiles must use the Healing Touch for the first time in years. After this, Stiles and Angie are recalled to Caduceus to treat a new GUILT-related disease called Post-GUILT Syndrome (PGS), a series of critical conditions that affect any patients with past GUILT exposure. A reformed Delphi appears to spread GUILT strains, determined to fulfill the original Delphi's goals. Caduceus are aided in their efforts against GUILT and PGS by two other medical research organizations, Acropolis Pharmaceuticals and the Hands of Asclepius (HOA).

During an operation against a GUILT outbreak, Stiles' overconfidence leads to a patient's death. This cripples his confidence and he loses his Healing Touch, forcing him to redo his training to regain his will to heal patients. He regains his ability when he must save Angie's father Kenneth Blackwell, repentant head researcher of the original Delphi, from a GUILT infection. Stiles' loss of confidence confuses Tulba, leading him to join the HOA. Acropolis and the HOA quickly gain ground in government circles after developing an artificial Healing Touch; while Caduceus is wary of the emotionless HOA surgeons with this ability, governments throw their support behind HOA to the detriment of Caduceus. Stiles becomes suspicious of Acropolis and the HOA's respective leaders Reina Mayuzumi and Patrick Mercer. Meanwhile, Stiles becomes allies with Mercer's stepdaughter Heather Ross, whom he saved from a GUILT infection. Eventually, the new Delphi is routed after they kidnap Stiles and Angie, who quickly escape and relay their location. Caduceus then confirms HOA's shady dealings when athletes show infection from new GUILT strains dubbed Neo-GUILT; HOA has been using altered GUILT samples to develop performance-enhancing medicines.

Blackwell—who was planted by Caduceus executives—reveals that HOA doctors are taking this medication, giving them their abilities while infecting them with Neo-GUILT. With this evidence, Caduceus and the authorities storm the HOA headquarters, which is storing vats of GUILT modified for airborne dispersal. Stiles cures multiple doctors of Neo-GUILT infection including Tulba. Confronting Mercer and later Mayuzumi, Stiles learns that the Neo-GUILT research was intended to revive Mercer's wife Tracy from a coma, and that Mayuzumi has preserved her youth using the final Neo-GUILT strain; her intent was to use GUILT-based products for profit. Mercer fails to wake Tracy, then injects Mayuzumi with his final experimental treatment and causes her to age rapidly, forcing Stiles to operate on her to prevent an implanted device dispersing the GUILT. Before the despairing Mercer can blow up the facility, he is shot dead. Caduceus's reputation is restored, Tulba returns to Costigar to continue helping as a doctor, Heather takes over Tracy's care studying to be a nurse, and Stiles and Angie travel abroad and begin a relationship.

== Development ==
Under The Knife 2 was produced as a response to perceived player discomfort about the change in consoles from the DS with Under the Knife to the Wii for subsequent entries. While the team had continued the overarching narrative of Trauma Center using New Blood, Under the Knife 2 was created as a true sequel to the original in both story and mechanics. Primary development was handled by video game production company Vanguard. The game was co-directed by Daisuke Kanada, series director since Trauma Center: Second Opinion, and Hirokazu Toyama of Vanguard. The character designs were created by Masayuki Doi, who had worked on both Second Opinion and New Blood. Toyama had previous experience of the series due to helping with the programming of earlier titles, but was shocked when he was asked to direct the game. Under the Knife 2 was Toyama's debut as a game director. Most of the systems used in Under the Knife were carried over into its sequel, with much of the work focusing on polishing the existing experience. A new addition compared to the original DS version were more voice clips for characters, and the "Easy" mode. The former required a large portion of the console's ROM alongside the music. The narrative, in addition to the usual theme of saving life through surgery, included instances of treating the poor, doctor shortages, and anti-aging medicine.

The music was composed by Manabu Namiki and Noriyuki Kamikura of Basiscape, a music studio founded by Hitoshi Sakimoto. The audio direction and sound design were respectively handled by Miki Ito and Kentaro Nakagoshi. While Trauma Center series composer Kenichi Tsuchiya was contacted about working on Under the Knife 2, his other work at the time prevented him from taking part, leading to Basiscape being brought on board. Due to the game's music being streamed and not played natively on the DS sound hardware, the sound quality of the music increased markedly over that of the original Trauma Center. Neither composer had worked on previous entries in the series. Namiki wrote his themes to express saving lives in an exciting scenario, and take advantage of the DS's sound and control elements. He used the themes of "weight" for the surgical segments and "human praise" for the story sections.

The game was first announced in April 2008. Under the Knife 2 is the fourth game in the Trauma Center series, and the second and last produced for the DS. The localization was handled by Atlus USA, who collaborated on the process with Vanguard. The cover design was carried over almost unaltered for the Japanese version. The subtitle went through several versions during the localization process, ultimately settling on a numeral placed in front of the original game's title to denote its status as a sequel. The English dub was handled by PCP Productions, whose work went back to the beginning of the series. The game was released in North America on July 1, 2008, releasing a month before its Japanese equivalent. A demo was released on the Nintendo eShop for a limited time following the North American release. Its Japanese release came on August 7. A guidebook on August 28, and a soundtrack album was published in November 2011 by Sweep Records. The album was reissued digitially on streaming platforms in December 2025, the series' 20th anniversary. When speaking about a remake of Under the Knife 2 for the Wii similar to Second Opinion, Atlus USA said that taking a game "back and forth" between the DS and Wii did not fit in with Atlus's business model. Under the Knife 2 saw no release in Europe.

== Reception ==
Reception

Aggregate score
Aggregator	Score
Metacritic	79/100 (29 reviews)

Review scores
Publication	Score
1Up.com	B
Edge	6/10
Famitsu	32/40
Game Informer	8.5/10
GamePro	2.5/5
GameSpot	8.5/10
GameSpy	4.5/5
GamesRadar+	4/5
IGN	8.4/10
Nintendo World Report	6.5/10

Under the Knife 2 failed to appear in Japanese sales charts for either 2008 or 2009. During that period, it also failed to appear in Atlus's summary of high-selling titles for the period between August 2008 to July 2009. Review aggregate website Metacritic awarded the game a score of 79 out of 100 based on 29 reviews, indicating "generally favourable" reviews. The game was nominated for Best Action Game on the DS in IGN's 2008 video game awards, and was ranked among the best Nintendo DS games by GamesRadar+ and GamePro.

Japanese gaming magazine Famitsu praised the control refinements and elements, which helped contribute to its feeling of speed. Andrew Fitch of 1UP.com was wary of going into the game after reviewers of previous entries for the website expressed high frustration, but was won over by its pacing and smooth controls. Bryan Voor and Jeremy Parish, writing for Game Informer, applauded the inclusion of lower difficulty options and more grounded tone, with Parish calling the available operations "more interesting and varied than any other entry". GameSpot's Shiva Stella said that Under the Knife 2 "successfully blends a creative medical theme with bizarre but fun puzzle gameplay to create an addictive treat".

Dave Kosak of GameSpy praised the gameplay and narrative improvements made by the game, but found fault with the cutscenes and repetitive music. GamesRadar's Alan Kim was also pleased with the general improvements over the original game, but was disappointed by the lack of a multiplayer element. Raychul Moore of GamePro was not impressed by the game, enjoying some elements of gameplay but finding its narrative and difficulty off-putting. IGN's Mark Bozon gave high praise to the story and gameplay, but felt it lacked content and replay value found in New Blood. Jonathan Metts of Nintendo World Report was less positive than other reviewers, faulting its lack of improvements and new features and calling the game "a complete rehash that it makes me question the reason for its existence". Edge staff stated that while it borrowed some elements from the first game, it took only the "choice donor cuts", appreciating that it used the Wii games' "clean" visuals over those of Under the Knife. They also enjoyed the return to stylus controls, stating that while the Wii Remote gameplay of the Wii entries created an "ideal laser simulator", the stylus was a superior choice for slicing and stitching. Wired writer Earnest Cavalli felt that, while the first game was considered one of the first innovative use of the DS' touchscreen, this game largely recycled much of its content. He felt that fans of the series could get enjoyment out of it, but believed that even the biggest fans would question why a game released three years after had such a lack of innovation.

The plot was generally praised for its quality and grounded nature, but some critics found the cutscenes and dialogue segments overly long. Fitch was particularly negative about the translation, calling it inferior to the localizations of Persona 3 and Odin Sphere. There was also praise for the improved quality of the controls, art style and music over the original game. A common observation by critics was that there was little to nothing new that distinguished it from earlier Trauma Center games.

Video Game Music Online writer Chris Greening praised the composers for managing to create a soundtrack that preserved the most enjoyable elements of the first game's soundtrack. He felt that, while Namiki's music was more "defined", Kamikura's music had improved production quality.
