= Metaphor: ReFantazio =

2024 video game

- Developer: Studio Zero
- Publisher: Sega: JP: Atlus
- Director: Katsura Hashino
- Producers: Osamu Ohashi; Naoto Hiraoka; Junichi Yoshizawa; Katsura Hashino
- Programmer: Yujiro Kosaka
- Artists: Yasuhiro Akimoto; Shigenori Soejima
- Writers: Yuichiro Tanaka; Katsura Hashino
- Composer: Shoji Meguro
- Platforms: PlayStation 4; PlayStation 5; Windows; Xbox Series X/S; Nintendo Switch 2
- Release: PS4, PS5, Win, XSX/S; October 11, 2024; Nintendo Switch 2; November 12, 2026
- Genre: Role-playing
- Mode: Single-player

Metaphor: ReFantazio (Note: Japanese: メタファー：リファンタジオ, Hepburn: Metafā: Rifantajio) is a 2024 role-playing video game developed by Studio Zero and published by Sega. Metaphor: ReFantazio was first announced under the working title Project Re:Fantasy in December 2016, with no further information revealed until 2023, and was released for PlayStation 4, PlayStation 5, Windows, and Xbox Series X/S by Atlus in Japan and by Sega internationally on October 11, 2024. A Nintendo Switch 2 version was released on November 12, 2026.

The game is set in the United Kingdom of Euchronia, a medieval fantasy realm mirroring the contemporary real world, after the assassination of its former King. Years earlier, an assassination attempt on the Prince resulted in him being cursed and falling into a long slumber. The protagonist, an orphaned boy of the magic-wielding Elda tribe and the Prince's childhood friend, participates in the Royal Tournament held to decide the throne's successor, journeying across Euchronia to rally support from its people while searching for a way to lift the curse.

Metaphor: ReFantazio sold one million copies on release day across all platforms and received widespread acclaim, with praise being directed towards its narrative, worldbuilding, visuals, gameplay, and themes reflecting real-world issues both politically and socially, although it received some criticism regarding its technical problems at launch. It was nominated for several awards, including Game of the Year from several outlets and awards ceremonies, and won the Game Awards for Best Art Direction, Best Narrative, and Best Role-Playing Game, won the D.I.C.E. Award for Role-Playing Game of the Year at the 28th Annual D.I.C.E. Awards, and won the Grand Prize at the 2025 Japan Game Awards.

== Gameplay ==
The protagonist debates Lina, another candidate in the election, which in turn helps broaden his "Royal Virtues". Metaphor: ReFantazio incorporates many systems from the Persona and Shin Megami Tensei series.

Metaphor: ReFantazio is a role-playing game that incorporates multiple systems previously used in other Atlus titles, including dungeon crawling and social simulation. The game follows a male protagonist, named by the player, (Note: Named "Will" by default) who is accompanied by his fairy guide, as he uncovers the secrets behind the previous king's assassination.

Players are free to choose how the protagonist spends his day, including exploration, spending time with allies, fulfilling requests for other people, and bettering his skills, though they need to be wary of any time restrictions. The game revolves around a day-night cycle and weather system, which dictates specific behavior in-game. The game features time-sensitive activities structured after a day-to-day calendar, which determines the availability of specific characters and events; this is also tied to the story, in which not completing a major story event before a deadline will result in a game over, forcing the player to return to a previous save. The calendar and weather systems previously originated from the Persona series. Also originating from Persona is the "Travellers' Voice" feature, a minor, asynchronous multiplayer element where players can see what activities other players did in a given day.

The game features several social simulation elements prominently used in the Persona series. Alongside the aforementioned calendar system, the game features the "Follower" system, a system building on the Social Links and Confidants in previous Persona titles, in which the player forges bonds with the locals of Euchronia's regions, including members of their party, in order to increase public favor towards the protagonist ahead of the election to decide the next King. Ranking up each follower unlocks benefits for the player and their party, whether it be in battle, traversing dungeons, or overall.

Traveling between locations will use up time; in this time, the player can opt to improve their royal virtues, a system based on the Social Stats from the Persona series, spend time with followers, or improve their own stats. The player can take on requests, which consist of side-quests that can reward the player with items and broaden their five aforementioned "Royal Virtues". They are based on the Social Stats from the Persona series: Courage, Wisdom, Tolerance, Eloquence, and Imagination. These are obtainable through doing in-game activities and, in some cases, are needed to progress through certain follower bonds.

=== Archetypes ===
The player and their party members assume the role of an Archetype, similar to Personas from the Persona series. Archetypes are physical manifestations brought about by one’s own insecurities. Acting as the game's job system, each archetype has their own unique skills that can be further gained by leveling their rank, and can also evolve into stronger ones depending on the desired rank. New archetypes are acquired as the player forges bonds with their followers, and can be purchased, assigned, and modified for any party member. Unlike Personas, which are restricted to one for each party member, the protagonist's party members can wield more than one archetype.

When a party member possesses two or more different archetypes, they can inherit skills from any others based on the archetype they are currently assigned to, and if two or more compatible archetypes are present in battle, party members can perform stronger skills known as synthesis skills. However, while powerful, synthesis skills will consume more turn icons. MAG, the currency that can be used in Akademeia to purchase and modify Archetypes, can be exchanged for Reeve, the game's currency, in large cities. The current weather dictates the exchange rate; the worse it is, the higher the exchange rate will be.

=== Exploration and combat ===
All of the dungeons in the game are story-specific and are populated by enemies of many kinds, with "humans" being the strongest. Humans may also be encountered in boss fights. Exploring dungeons and defeating enemies allow the player to obtain loot, experience points, and Reeve. Some dungeons are affected by the weather in the region, with worse weather strengthening enemies, and feature platforming and stealth, both of which were introduced to dungeons in Persona 5 (2016). While exploring dungeons, the protagonist can activate an ability similar to Joker's "third eye" ability from Persona 5, that allows him to highlight interactable objects and enemy strength. All dungeons hold safe rooms, called "Magla hollows", where the player can save their progress, talk to allies, or fast travel to other magla hollows or the dungeon entrance.

Combat against enemies can be triggered in three ways: triggering the fight manually, getting ambushed, or having the advantage. The game has two battle systems: real-time action combat occurs while exploring, with traditional turn-based battle mechanics (prominently used in the Megami Tensei series, of which the Persona series originates from) occurring during initiated encounters and boss fights, dubbed Fast & Squad. Attacking enemies in real-time can be chained into a player advantage state, where their party stuns the opponents for the majority of the player’s first two phases. In traditional turn-based combat, the "Press Turn" system rewards extra turns for hitting enemy weaknesses, but the player can also lose turns if an attack misses. The player is also able to switch party formations, use any consumable items, restart the fight at any point, swap out party members, or escape. In battle, party members can use their equipped weapons or their Archetypes' abilities to attack, and can strike an enemy's weakness to knock them down. Winning battles will grant experience to all party members, and the game ends when all party members lose their health points and are knocked out. Unlike previous Atlus titles, however, the protagonist being knocked out in turn-based combat does not end the battle.

== Synopsis ==
=== Setting and characters ===
Metaphor: ReFantazio takes place in the United Kingdom of Euchronia, a medieval fantasy realm inhabited by various races called Tribes, including the horned clemar, the long-eared roussainte, the grey-skinned and white-haired rhoag, the winged ishkia, the bright-eyed and luminescent-haired nidia, the bestial paripus, the bat-like eugief, the three-eyed mustari, and the humanoid elda. Despite efforts to unite the Tribes as equals, discrimination is rampant, with some Tribes, such as the paripus and elda, suffering the most. Notable groups include the Sanctist Church, a state religion led by Sanctifex Forden that is rivaled by general Louis Guiabern, who follows an ideology of social darwinism, atheism, and meritocracy, and the Resistance, who has been guarding the prince since he was cursed. Following the death of the king, Hythlodaeus V, who possessed exclusive access to Royal Magic, without an apparent heir, the country is plunged into chaos amidst political tensions. The country is also terrorized by mysterious monsters called Humans.

The protagonist, named Will by default, is a boy of the elda tribe who has been ostracized by society and endures discrimination and prejudice for being "tainted" with the inheritance of forbidden magic. Along with his fairy companion Gallica, who assists him with her knowledge and ability to sense Magla, a substance that is the source of magic and is formed from anxiety, he embarks on a quest to lift the curse placed on his childhood friend, the prince of Euchronia. He and other party members also gain the power to call upon Archetypes, the souls of ancient heroes, while the mysterious author More, who resides in the isolated realm of Akademeia, helps them improve their Archetypes and unlock new ones.

=== Plot ===
After Louis Guiabern assassinates Hythlodaeus V, the Resistance sends Will and Gallica to find rhoag mercenary Arvid Grius. Along the way, they meet clemar and former noble Leon Strohl da Haliaetus, and Will awakens to the power of Archetypes. That night, after meeting Grius, Will travels in his dreams to the mystical library Akademeia and meets More, the enigmatic author of a novel he always carries with him.

Grius, who was present the night the prince was attacked, infers that Louis cast the curse and that killing him will break it. Upon returning to the capital of Grand Trad, the party plans to assassinate Louis at the king's funeral. During the event, Louis arrives and makes a claim to the throne; however, the palace levitates into the sky with the king's face carved into the rock beneath it. Hythlodaeus' spirit announces that his successor will be chosen based on popular support. Grius attacks Louis, but the Royal Magic stops him, protecting Louis as a popular candidate for king. Louis kills Grius and sends the necromancer Zorba to retrieve the Royal Sceptre from beneath the palace. Will and Strohl recruit roussainte Eiselin Hulkenberg, a former Kingsguard who served the prince, and defeat Zorba, who falls to his presumed death while the Royal Sceptre levitates into the palace. The party decides to participate in the Tournament for the Throne, a competition organized by Forden and the Church that is rigged to favor Forden, to gain Louis' support so they can infiltrate his inner circle and steal the curse's formula.

The first task calls for the head of a monster, and the party decides to take the head of a rogue knight who is kidnapping children. They confront the knight, eugief Heismay Noctule, but learn that Sanctist priestess Joanna, distraught after the murder of her child, was feeding the town's children to a human and framed him for it. Heismay convinces Joanna to confess her crimes, resulting in her execution, and humiliating Forden. Afterwards, Louis accepts Will's request to serve under him. During a soiree, Will steals the curse's formula and recruits nidia performer and undercover Resistance agent Juani "Junah" Cygnus.

The second task is to retrieve holy relics from "pagan" lands. Along with Louis' lieutenants, paripus brothers Fidelio and Basilio Magnus, the party heads to Virga Island to retrieve the spear Drakodios. Descending underground through an ancient temple, they save mustari priestess Euphausia "Eupha" Etoreika and discover the ruins of Shinjuku, said to be from the "World Before" predating Euchronia's history. At the bottom of the temple, they find Drakodios, which bypasses the Royal Magic and can therefore kill royal candidates. Eupha joins the party, and together they travel to Altabury Heights, where they give Louis a counterfeit of Drakodios. Will then uses the real Drakodios to seemingly kill Louis. However, the party then realizes that Forden was responsible for the curse after the prince remains comatose. Louis reveals himself to be alive, having been healed by the still-alive Zorba, and Forden attacks him with Drakodios. However, the fake and genuine Drakodios have been swapped without Forden's knowledge, allowing Louis to kill him with the real one. Fidelio protects Basilio and innocent Sanctist bystanders from Louis's attacks, dying in the process. Basilio joins the party to avenge him.

Rella Cygnus, Junah's adoptive sister, is revealed to be the one who cursed the prince as a child due to Forden threatening to kill Junah if she didn't comply. After testing the party's strength, she publicly admits her and the Church's role in the prince's attempted assassination before committing suicide, lifting the curse. Louis challenges Will to a duel in Grand Trad; during the duel, he uses his powers to transform Will into a human, causing the public to turn on Will. After Will transforms back to normal, the party is forced to flee to the elda sanctum, where the prince is hidden, only to discover that Zorba had already found and killed the prince. The spirit of the prince's mother contacts Will, revealing that he is the embodiment of the prince's hopes and dreams of changing the world. After Will merges with the prince's body, the party learns that the World Before was destroyed after humanity discovered Magla and wielded it in wars. Those overexposed to Magla transformed into humans, and the survivors evolved into the tribes, with the elda being direct descendants of humanity.

At Grand Trad, Louis ascends to the palace in the sky and claims the Royal Sceptre, the source of the Royal Magic, which gains its tremendous power by drawing in the anxieties of the masses in the form of Magla. The party enters the palace, slays Zorba, and confronts Louis, who reveals that he is an elda who was traumatized after Forden burned the elda sanctum down in an attempt to kill the prince. Louis plans to reverse the Sceptre's flow, overexposing the masses with Magla to transform them into humans. He believes that doing so will remove prejudice from the world, and that the strong will survive and transform back from humans into their original forms, just as Will had. He attempts to transform Will into a human again, but Will rips his heart out to stop the process and seemingly dies.

More brings Will to Akademeia, claiming that Euchronia was a fantasy while the utopia from his novel is reality. After briefly battling Will, More realizes that he is a younger version of Hythlodaeus, who, having lost hope after his wife was killed and the prince was cursed, created More to guide Will. Will awakens in Euchronia and reunites with his friends. Louis transforms into a human, but the party destroys him and the Royal Sceptre, and the spirit of Hythlodaeus pronounces Will as king before Hythlodaeus departs to the afterlife with his wife for good. One year after Will's coronation, he and the party leave on a new journey to address the kingdom's remaining problems.

=== Bad endings ===
The game has multiple bad endings depending on the player's choice.

- If Will refuses to admit that he is the prince at the elda sanctum, Louis takes the throne unopposed and destroys Euchronia, erasing it from history.
- If Will agrees to join Louis' cause during their final confrontation, they rule over the newly created nation of humans, which quickly crumbles into chaos.
- If Will accepts More's claim that Euchronia was merely a fantasy, they leave it to its fate, choosing to stay in More's "utopia".

== Development ==
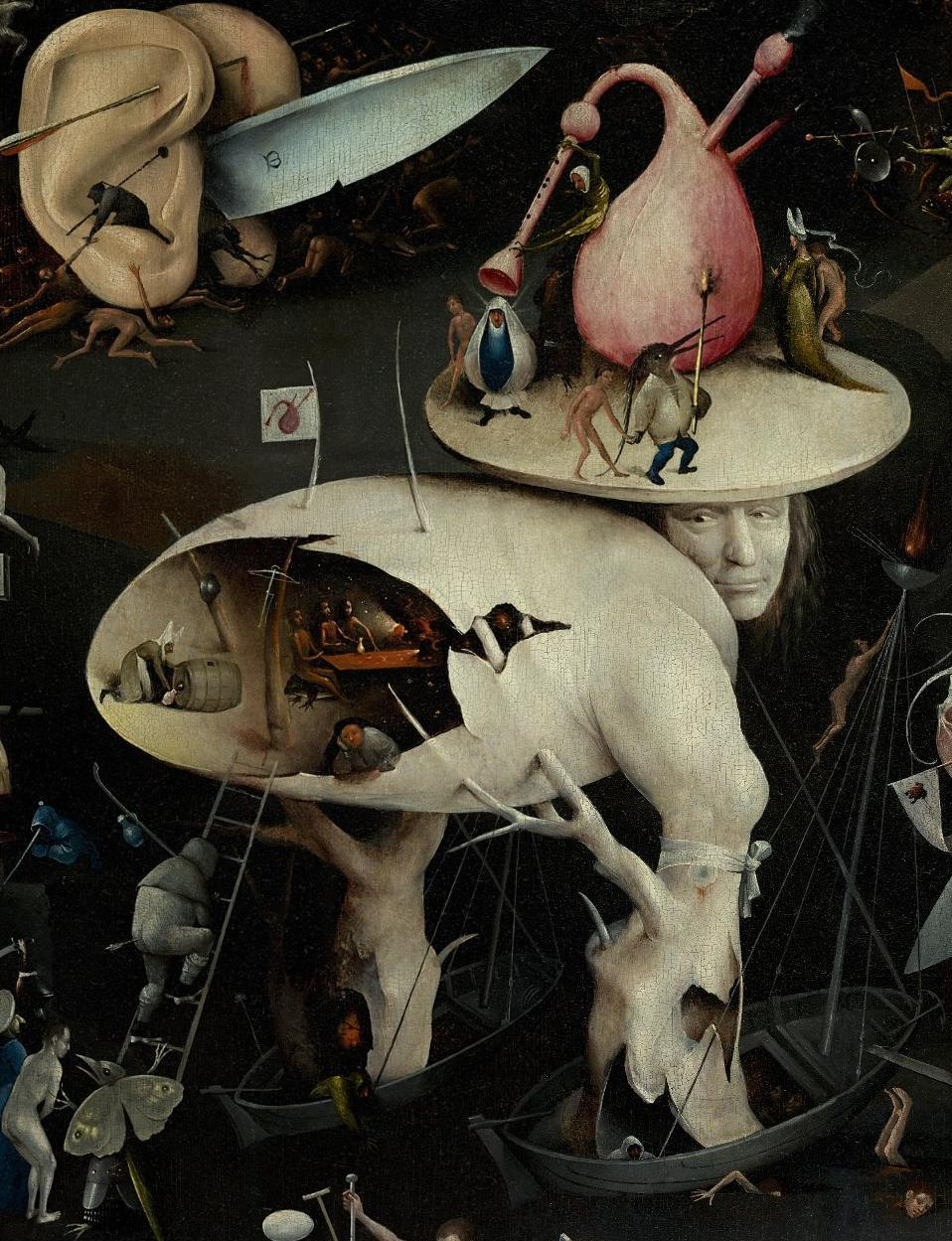
"Humans", the monsters in the game, were influenced by medieval painter Hieronymus Bosch (detail from The Garden of Earthly Delights).

Following the Japanese release of Persona 5 in September 2016, the game's director Katsura Hashino, who had been involved in Atlus' tentpole franchise Megami Tensei as the prior game director for Shin Megami Tensei III: Nocturne (2003), Digital Devil Saga (2004), Persona 3 (2006), and Persona 4 (2008), as well as the creative producer of the publisher's 2nd Creative Production Department, later known as P-Studio, announced his intent to leave the development team and his duties with the Persona series, citing a personal desire to explore other projects due to what he considered a shift in creative direction with Persona 5. On December 19, 2016, Atlus Japan revealed that Hashino was establishing a new internal development studio within the publisher named Studio Zero. Their first game was announced two days later under the working title Project Re:Fantasy.

Metaphor: ReFantazio features Persona character artist Shigenori Soejima and music composer Shoji Meguro. The lyrics accompanying the game music were written in Esperanto and chanted by Myōhō–ji temple's chief priest, Keisuke Honryo. Other key staff include producer Junichi Yoshizawa, writer Yuichiro Tanaka, and gameplay designers Azusa Kido and Kenichi Goto. Alongside the game's reveal, Japanese publication Weekly Famitsu released an exclusive interview conducted between them, Hashino and Atlus company director Naota Hiraoka. The latter outlined the importance of Project Re:Fantasy as a new IP for Atlus, affirming that the goal behind creating Studio Zero was to "aim even higher" with original projects that could stand separately from either the Megami Tensei or Persona franchises, though the development team's formation was previously stifled due to the people of interest to the company being committed to other projects at that time, which partly led to Hashino's selection to serve as creative producer and game director for the project after finishing Persona 5.

Hashino explained Studio Zero's intentions of creating a role-playing game rooted in traditional fantasy aesthetics, reflecting on his awareness of the publisher's reputation for creating RPGs with contemporary backdrops to counter developers who were more comfortable with the fantasy genre as it went mainstream. Hiraoka additionally spoke to Soejima and Meguro's involvement in the project, calling them both "indispensable" members of the Persona team who would continue to hold their respective roles at P-Studio, but were brought onto Studio Zero and Project Re:Fantasy due to a shared desire between Hashino and Hiraoka to have their talents serve another project away from their typical contributions. On December 23, Atlus opened the official website for Studio Zero, with a foreword from Hashino and an unveiling of further staff involved in the studio and Project Re:Fantasy beyond Hashino, Meguro and Soejima. At this time, Atlus was recruiting locally for more staff to join the game's development, including programmers, planners, and designers.

A second concept video for the game was released in December 2017 alongside the announcement that Studio Zero was developing the enhanced re-release Catherine: Full Body for PlayStation 4 and PlayStation Vita. Alongside the teaser, a new developer message from Hashino was released online, where he clarified the team was "very much in the middle of development", but not to the point where they could divulge specifics regarding the title's gameplay, though the teaser was meant to infer elements of the game itself. In later interviews, Hashino stated that he would have more to share on the game following the Japanese release of Full Body in February 2018. In the November 2019 issue of Game Informer, Shigenori Soejima affirmed his enthusiasm for being involved in the game's development, describing the challenge presented regarding defining "what exactly is fantasy and how can we bring a meaningful fantasy game into this world?". He also asserted that the game was in a state where a concrete direction had been decided upon and the team were moving forward with it. A second interview between Weekly Famitsu and Naota Hiraoka in July 2021 included further anecdotes regarding the game's progress, whereby Hiroaka stated, "Project Re:Fantasy is progressing little by little, and we hope to deliver it when the timing is right."

=== Story and themes ===
Katsura Hashino stated that the primary keyword he thought of when devising the narrative and setting for Metaphor: ReFantazio was "utopia", and exploring themes regarding the dissonance between an ideal fantasy setting and the real world, where goals such as achieving equality are unattainable. Hashino and the writing team took into consideration the variance in perspective on topics such as justice and reason, and wished to create a world with characters who did not adhere to strict values of what was morally right or wrong. This allowed them to deviate from the "clear-cut dynamics" previously presented with the narratives in the Persona series, which often involved morally incorruptible teenagers confronting evil adult figures. Despite wishing to largely deviate from conflicts and finer themes previously explored in the Persona games, Hashino wished to retain the player-driven sensation of living through and experiencing another world, much like the school life component of the Persona series. He wanted the experience to evoke a trip with set intervals for activities, rather than a long journey. Another main theme explored in the game's story revolves around personal anxieties, with the characters having arcs built around "realizing their inner strength, as well as fighting their anxieties and fears by finding personal ground with others." The game's lead scenario planner Yuichiro Tanaka, who reprises his duties from the Persona games directed by Hashino, took inspiration from political clashes in the real world, which he believed to be sourced from the different ways people confront anxiety. This led him and the writing staff to devise the concept behind the tribe system in Euchronia, with disparate communities interacting with their fears in different ways. Unlike the social mechanics of the Persona games, which enabled the ability for the protagonist to become romantically involved with their party, Metaphor: ReFantazio eschews such relationships in order to retain the realism of the scenario. Hashino explained that the game pivoting towards an adult-centered narrative and the royal election as a backdrop meant focusing the strengthening of bonds on garnering support from the different regions around Euchronia, meaning it was important to prioritize the support of communities unto the protagonist over the "back-and-forth of romance."

In an interview with The Washington Post, Hashino described a question about how the game's story was about "hope [and] fighting for a future we can only imagine" as "really hit[ting] the core." Hashino then described hope as "progressing toward something undefined and undetermined by you or anyone else" and said that he wanted players' gameplay experiences to encourage people to analyze their own lives.

== Marketing and release ==
Metaphor: ReFantazio was officially unveiled in June 2023 during Microsoft's Xbox Games Showcase video presentation, where it was slated to release for Windows and Xbox Series X/S. Later that month, a "Special Celebration Livestream" featuring the Persona Stalker Club was streamed on YouTube, where the game was separately confirmed to be in development for PlayStation 4 and PlayStation 5. A second trailer unveiling additional gameplay, character, and story details premiered during The Game Awards 2023 pre-show in December 2023. That same month, an end-of-year livestream was broadcast by the publisher featuring guest appearances from the game's Japanese voice cast, and unveiling additional details on the story, characters and gameplay. Starting in April 2024, Atlus held a series of "ATLUS Exclusive" livestreams dedicated to introducing various aspects of the game, ranging from systems to narrative content. A second trailer focused on the game's various Archetypes, titled "Awaken" was released alongside the second ATLUS Exclusive stream in June 2024, followed by a full story trailer the next month. A third trailer centered on the election system, titled "Travel Beyond Fantasy" was published online in late August 2024. A fourth trailer titled "United Kingdom of Euchronia" was also released that month.

The game's first playable demo was made available to the public during ATLUS Fes 2024 in June, allowing players to sample three isolated scenarios from the game's story - the protagonist's awakening to his first Archetype, an early dungeon, and a boss fight from towards the mid-point of the game. This demo was also brought to Summer Game Fest the same month. A second demo featuring the game's first hour of narrative and gameplay was playable to the press during the week of Gamescom in August 2024. SEGA and Atlus released a full downloadable "Prologue Demo" on September 25, 2024, for all platforms, allowing players to experience the full opening chapter of the game comprising five hours of gameplay, including the first four dungeons, seven out of the game's 40 unlockable Archetypes, and six Followers. Save data from the demo is able to be transferred to the full release. This demo was released on Nintendo Switch 2 on October 13, 2026, which retains the ability to bring forward saves to the full title, ahead of its launch the following November.

Metaphor: ReFantazio was released for PlayStation 4, PlayStation 5, Windows, and Xbox Series X/S on October 11, 2024. Between May 2025 and May 2026, the game was available to play on the Xbox Game Pass Ultimate subscription for Windows and Xbox Series X/S users. A Nintendo Switch 2 version was announced during the June 2026 installment of Nintendo Direct and was released on November 12, 2026.

In addition to the standard release, a special Collector's Edition was distributed. This, alongside a physical copy of the game, included a special SteelBook case, a two-disc soundtrack, an art book, a set of metallic pins, a sticker sheet, and a cloth map of the United Kingdom of Euchronia. The Collector's Edition is also bundled with a digital history book and soundtrack commemorating the 35th anniversary of Atlus, themed around their prior releases. The digital Collector's Edition contents are also available as part of the Atlus 35th Digital Anniversary Edition. All pre-orders granted access to the downloadable content (DLC) Archetype EXP Chest Set and Adventurer's Journey Pack, containing various early-game items for the starting playthrough. The Collector's Edition and Digital Anniversary Edition come with vouchers for the game's additional standalone DLC content.

In a first anniversary livestream of the game, a Digital Guidebook Edition was announced for an early 2026 release. The bundle contains the digital base game, the Metaphor: ReFantazio Essential Digital Strategy Guide, a 55-page digital guidebook excerpt curated and re-edited by FuturePress from their printed 592-page complete official game guide, digital artbook and soundtrack, and Persona 5 and Shin Megami Tensei V costume and in-game music (see #Downloadable content below). Owners of the existing Atlus 35th Digital Anniversary Edition will receive the guidebook download for free in the future. It was released on January 12, 2026.

=== Downloadable content ===
Eight pieces of day one downloadable content (DLC) were distributed alongside the launch of the game and are bundled as part of a "Costume & Battle BGM Set DLC" pack, which consists of costumes and custom music inspired by prior Atlus titles. These include sets inspired by the six main Persona games, as well as packs inspired by Shin Megami Tensei IV (2013), Shin Megami Tensei V (2021) and the Etrian Odyssey series.

=== Tie-in media and merchandise ===
On September 4, 2025, Milou Farm House at Grand Indonesia Mall promoted the game by offering a limited menu from September 30 to October 13, while offering a space for visitors to try the demo and a cosplayer meet and greet event. On September 19, 2024, the Haas F1 Team announced a collaboration with Atlus in promoting the game by featuring the designs of the protagonist (for Kevin Magnussen) and Hulkenberg (for Nico Hülkenberg), on both drivers' helmets and their F1 cars during the 2024 Singapore Grand Prix.

On May 3, 2025, Hyte announced a partnership with Atlus for their Hyte Collection in a Y70 computer case.

A manga adaption was announced on the game's Twitter account. It is currently being serialized in Shueisha's V Jump magazine, and is drawn by Yoichi Amano. It began serialization on January 21, 2025. The series' chapters are simultaneously published in English on Shueisha's Manga Plus service.

No.	Release date	ISBN
1	June 4, 2025	978-4-08-884552-4
2	October 3, 2025	978-4-08-884697-2
3	February 4, 2026	978-4-08-884841-9
4	June 4, 2026	978-4-08-885077-1
5	October 2, 2026	978-4-08-885209-6

== Reception ==
Reception

Aggregate scores
Aggregator	Score
Metacritic	(PC) 92/100 (Note: Based on 37 reviews) (PS5) 94/100 (Note: Based on 54 reviews) (NS2) 85/100 (Note: Based on 15 reviews) (XSXS) 92/100 (Note: Based on 39 reviews)
OpenCritic	98% (Note: Based on 166 reviews)

Review scores
Publication	Score
Digital Trends	4/5
Eurogamer	5/5
Famitsu	37/40
Game Informer	9/10
GameSpot	10/10
GamesRadar+	4.5/5
IGN	9/10
Jeuxvideo.com	18/20
PCGamesN	9/10
Push Square	9/10
Shacknews	10/10
Video Games Chronicle	5/5
VG247	5/5

Metaphor: ReFantazio received "universal acclaim" from critics, according to review aggregator website Metacritic, while 98% of critics recommended the game, according to OpenCritic.

The Verge praised the game's handling of the themes of racism and discrimination, finding it tackled such subjects with "refreshing nuance". The Washington Post called it the "year’s smartest, most exciting video game", praised its political relevance, and gave it 4/4 stars.

On the flip side, Inverse mentioned issues with Persona elements and dungeon repetition, while XboxEra noted flaws in story aspects and handholding tendencies.

=== Sales ===
Metaphor ReFantazio sold one million units on the same day it launched, becoming the fastest-selling game developed by Atlus.

During SEGA's 2025 Management Meeting, it was revealed that Metaphor ReFantazio surpassed 2 million sales worldwide.

=== Awards ===
IGN and GameSpot selected Metaphor: ReFantazio as their Game of the Year in 2024.

Year	Ceremony	Category	Result	Ref.
2024	Golden Joystick Awards	Ultimate Game of the Year	Nominated (Note: Voted #5 out of twelve nominees for Ultimate Game of the Year)	
2024	Golden Joystick Awards	Best Visual Design	Nominated	
2024	The Game Awards 2024	Game of the Year	Nominated	
2024	The Game Awards 2024	Best Game Direction	Nominated	
2024	The Game Awards 2024	Best Narrative	Won	
2024	The Game Awards 2024	Best Art Direction	Won	
2024	The Game Awards 2024	Best Score and Music	Nominated	
2024	The Game Awards 2024	Best Role-Playing Game	Won	
2024	The Steam Awards	Outstanding Visual Style	Nominated	
2025	New York Game Awards	Big Apple Award for Best Game of the Year	Nominated	
2025	New York Game Awards	Herman Melville Award for Best Writing in a Game	Won	
2025	28th Annual D.I.C.E. Awards	Role-Playing Game of the Year	Won	
2025	28th Annual D.I.C.E. Awards	Outstanding Achievement in Story	Nominated	
2025	25th Game Developers Choice Awards	Game of the Year	Nominated	
2025	25th Game Developers Choice Awards	Best Audio	Honorable mention	
2025	25th Game Developers Choice Awards	Best Narrative	Won	
2025	25th Game Developers Choice Awards	Best Visual Art	Nominated	
2025	21st British Academy Games Awards	Best Game	Longlisted	
2025	21st British Academy Games Awards	Artistic Achievement	Longlisted	
2025	21st British Academy Games Awards	Audio Achievement	Longlisted	
2025	21st British Academy Games Awards	Game Design	Longlisted	
2025	21st British Academy Games Awards	Music	Longlisted	
2025	21st British Academy Games Awards	Narrative	Won	
2025	21st British Academy Games Awards	New Intellectual Property	Nominated	
2025	Japan Game Awards	Grand Prize	Won	
2025	Japan Game Awards	Award for Excellence	Won	
