= Trauma Center (video game series) =

- Recurring Western logo for the series
- Genres: Simulation; Visual novel
- Developer: Atlus (Note: Additional production handled by Media.Vision and Vanguard.)
- Publishers: JP: Atlus; NA: Atlus USA; PAL: Nintendo
- Creator: Katsura Hashino
- Platforms: Nintendo DS; Wii
- First release: Trauma Center: Under the Knife; June 16, 2005
- Latest release: Trauma Team; May 18, 2010

Trauma Center (Note: Known in Japan as Caduceus (カドゥケウス, Kadukeusu)) is a series of video games developed by Atlus, and published by Atlus (Japan, North America) and Nintendo (Europe, Australia). Beginning with Trauma Center: Under the Knife in 2005 for the Nintendo DS, four more entries were released on the DS and Wii between 2006 and 2010. The gameplay is split between a surgical gameplay simulation, and visual novel storytelling. The games follow different characters in a near-future Earth where advanced medical procedures have cured most diseases. A recurring organisation is Caduceus, a worldwide semi-covert medical research foundation. The games commonly feature outbreaks of various man-made diseases that pose a significant threat to humanity, as well as themes of bioterrorism.

The series was created by Katsura Hashino, who wanted to use the DS's controls to explore a simulation type only previously possible on PCs. Following the first game, a dedicated production team dubbed "CaduceTeam" was created to handle future games. Beginning with the Wii remake Second Opinion, the series was directed by Daisuke Kanada. The final entry to date, Trauma Team, expanded into other gameplay styles to combat player fatigue with the established gameplay. Commentary has focused both the series' theme on saving lives rather than killing enemies as was traditional in gaming, and the lack of innovation across its entries. Its first three entries saw commercial success, particularly in North America and Europe.

== Titles ==
Release timeline
2005	Trauma Center: Under the Knife
2006	Trauma Center: Second Opinion
2007	Trauma Center: New Blood
2008	Trauma Center: Under the Knife 2
2009
2010	Trauma Team

- Trauma Center: Under the Knife is the first entry in the series, released on the Nintendo DS. It was published in Japan and North America in 2005, and in Europe the following year. The game follows protagonist Derek Stiles as he confronts a manmade disease called GUILT.
- Trauma Center: Second Opinion is the second entry and a remake of the first game. It released as a launch title for the Wii in Japan and North America in 2006, and the following year in Europe and Australia. In addition to revisiting Stiles's battle against GUILT, Second Opinion adds missions for surgeon Naomi Kimishima (who also uses the alias Nozomi Weaver), and a new chapter closing off both narratives.
- Trauma Center: New Blood is the third entry in the series, released for the Wii first in North America in 2007, then in Japan and Europe regions in 2008, and Australia in 2009. The narrative follows two new doctors, Markus Vaughn and Valerie Blaylock, as they are recruited to fight Stigma, a new manmade disease spreading across the world.
- Trauma Center: Under the Knife 2, a direct sequel to Under the Knife and Second Opinion. It was released in North America and Japan in 2008 on the Nintendo DS. The story features Derek Stiles's encounters with several new GUILT-based threats.
- Trauma Team, the fifth and to-date final entry and cited as a spin-off title within the series universe, was released in 2010 on the Wii in Japan and North America. The story is split across six different doctors working at and around Resurgam First Care, a fictional hospital in Portland, Maine. The narrative focuses on the interpersonal relationships of the main characters, as well as the emerging threat of a new epidemic. A live-action pilot episode for a television show based on Trauma Team was made, but the series was not picked up for more episodes.

== Common elements ==
=== Gameplay ===
An early surgical operation from Trauma Center: Under the Knife 2; surgical gameplay is similar across the series, focusing on using different tools to treat injuries and medical conditions, and most titles feature art by Masayuki Doi.

The gameplay and presentation of Trauma Center use two recurring features: surgery simulation carried out from a first-person view, and the narrative delivered using a visual novel style. (Note: Visual novel genre cited in official Atlus pages.) Trauma Team includes surgery, but also shows five other specialties: emergency medicine where patients at the scene are given rapid treatments, endoscopy for small-scale internal treatment of the respiratory and the GI tracts, orthopedics which focuses on skeletal operations and reconstruction, diagnosis for determining medical conditions through a routine of speaking with the patient and examining medical scans, and forensic medicine where evidence from crime scenes and the victims are used to reach a conclusion to the case.

During surgery, the player operates on patients using a variety of tools: a scalpel, forceps, a healing gel known as the antibiotic gel, a syringe for injecting various medicines and vital stabilizers, a suture needle for stitching wounds, a surgical drain, a surgical laser, and an ultrasound scanner. The games also include special tools used outside the normal ones, such as the defibrillator for resuscitation, as well as bandages for covering surgical incisions. Operation types include treating car accident victims, tumor extractions, skin grafts for burn victims, bone fixation, aneurysms, organ transplants, as well as treating the various man-made diseases in the series. The DS titles make use of the touch screen, with players selecting and using tools using icons. For Second Opinion, New Blood, and Trauma Team, the controls were adjusted to work with the Wii Remote and Nunchuk, and added motion control functions, such as a modified version of the defibrillator.

A recurring gameplay mechanic across the series is the Healing Touch, an ability which grants superhuman advantages to surgeons who hold it. Its effects vary between individuals, with demonstrated abilities including slowing time, healing patients, and preventing a patient's vitals from dropping. It is activated by drawing a star shape on the screen. The Healing Touch and similar fantastical elements were toned down or removed in Trauma Team. Both New Blood and Trauma Team included local cooperative multiplayer options.

=== Setting and themes ===
The Trauma Center series is set in a near-future version of Earth where medical advances have led to the development of cures for previously major diseases such as AIDS and cancer. A key organisation is Caduceus; while outwardly a medical research body for studying intractable diseases, it has a semi-covert role fighting bioterrorism, such as the use of artificial pathogens. Caduceus originated from a secret organization run by the United States Department of Health and Human Services, before becoming an international organization able to act independent of the US Government. At the time of the games, there are branches present in the United States, Europe, and Japan. A recurring element across the series is the presence of science fiction or otherwise supernatural elements in the narratives. Trauma Team includes fewer elements of science fiction, notably including no explicit mention of the Healing Touch.

All the Trauma Center titles share the same universe and timeline. The original game and its remake are set in the year 2018. Under the Knife 2 is set three years after the first game's events. Trauma Team takes place at some point after the events of Second Opinion, though it is not directly connected to the rest of the series. The action takes place around the locality of Resurgam First Care, a fictional hospital in the United States where many of the protagonists work. New Blood is set ten years after the events of Second Opinion. Two recurring characters are Naomi Kimishima, a player character in Second Opinion and Trauma Team; and Derek Stiles, who makes appearances in each title in the series.

A recurring narrative theme in the Trauma Center series is the passion of doctors to save lives, as well as the impact of bioterrorism on society. In Second Opinion, a secondary theme is the limits of medical technology. The narrative themes of New Blood include issues of the cost of healthcare, persevering in the face of adversity, and inequality of medical access. The story of Under the Knife 2 incorporated issues of doctor shortages, medical training, and physically enhancing the human body through medicine. In Trauma Team, the story focused on themes of the preciousness of life and fear of death, drawing direct inspiration from the 2009 swine flu pandemic.

== Development ==
The original Trauma Center was created by Atlus staff member Katsura Hashino, who acted as producer. Beginning production in 2004, the team wanted to recreate the surgical simulation gameplay of PC titles for the DS, since its controls and hardware were more capable compared to others of the time. Many of the staff were veterans of Atlus's role-playing game Megami Tensei; their background in role-playing game development made the shift in genre challenging for them. Following the success of Under the Knife, Hashino brought some of the game's staff into a dedicated team to work on the series. They were internally known as "CaduceTeam", made up of what director Daisuke Kanada described as Atlus's most enthusiastic gamers. Kanada has worked on multiple Megami Tensei titles and collaborated with Hashino on several games since Maken X in 1999; Second Opinion was his debut as a director. Production of Second Opinion began in January 2006.

Recurring staff included Daisuke Kanada as director, programmer Takaaki Ikeda, and scenario writer Shogo Isogai, who worked on Under the Knife, Second Opinion and New Blood. Under the Knife was directed by Kazuya Niinou, who was later lead designer on the original Etrian Odyssey for Atlus, and would later work on titles for Imageepoch and Square Enix. MediaVision helped with production on New Blood, while Vanguard developed Under the Knife 2 under Atlus's supervision. Trauma Team began development in 2007, beginning as being similar to previous entries in the series before expanding into its current form, covering multiple medical professions. Nintendo acted as the series publisher in Europe and Australia.

The artwork was originally created by Maguro Ikehata, whose work was described as "very anime-styled". The surgery scenes were originally going to be very stylised, but the team eventually settled on a style which balanced realistic and cartoon graphics. From Second Opinion onwards, the characters were designed by Masayuki Doi. His goal with Second Opinion was to make the character designs more realistic, and his work on New Blood reflected input from Atlus USA for men and women in the cast to be in equal positions of importance. Doi and other artists for Trauma Team described the character and art design as having increased variety to reflect the different player characters' professions. During an interview regarding Shin Megami Tensei IV (2013), Doi stated his wish to work on another series entry, but was committed to working on the Megami Tensei series.

=== Music ===
The music for the series was worked on by several in-house composers including Kenichi Tsuchiya, Atsushi Kitajoh, and Shoji Meguro. Meguro and Tsuchiya co-composed the score for Under the Knife alongside Kenichi Kikkawa, encountering issues with the limited sound capacity of the DS. Tsuchiya returned to arrange and expand the score for Second Opinion alongside Shingo Yasumoto, and co-composed the score of New Blood with Kitajoh with several pieces written to reflect the lead characters' personalities. Kitajoh lead the music writing on Trauma Team alongside Ryota Kozuka, with Meguro contributing a small number of tracks. Due to the variety of gameplay and characters, the musical variety increased and the game featured over a hundred musical tracks. It also included a vocal theme "Gonna Be There", written by Kitajoh with lyrics by scenario writer Teppei Kobayashi. The score for Under the Knife 2 was notably worked on by Manabu Namiki and Noriyuki Kamikura from external company Basiscape. Soundtrack albums have been released physically and digitally for each entry.

== Reception ==
Aggregate review scores
Game	Metacritic
Trauma Center: Under the Knife	81/100 (45 reviews)
Trauma Center: Second Opinion	80/100 (49 reviews)
Trauma Center: New Blood	77/100 (43 reviews)
Trauma Center: Under the Knife 2	79/100 (29 reviews)
Trauma Team	82/100 (29 reviews)

While it had poor commercial performance in Japan, Trauma Center: Under the Knife was a notable sales success in North America and Europe, boosting Atlus's profits for the year. Second Opinion had similar regional performance differences, selling over 400,000 copies across North America and Europe. New Blood was also a commercial success overseas, selling within Atlus USA's expectations, although it saw lower sales than Second Opinion. Under the Knife 2 and Trauma Team saw less sales success.

In a series retrospective, Peter Davison of USGamer praised the series both for its notable position in Atlus's gaming library, and how individual titles made use of the Nintendo console mechanics. Joshua Jankiewicz of Hardcore Gaming 101 compared Trauma Center to the Ace Attorney series due to its anime presentation and dramatic presentation of the lead characters' career. In a preview of Trauma Team, Chris Hoffman of Nintendo Power called Under the Knife a "breakthrough title" which highlighted an alternate approach to video games focused on saving lives, but felt its sequels lacked innovation, while citing Trauma Team as an improvement. In a 2012 feature on Trauma Team for Nintendo World Report, Nate Andrews felt that the series had overall quality, but also described most entries as iterative and relying too much on the first game's established premise; he described Trauma Team as both a high quality Wii title in its own right and a refreshing take on the series. In a 2025 retrospective during the series' 20th anniversary year, Famitsu writer Kawachi highlighted the original game's dramatic storyline and high difficulty, while recommending Trauma Team for its characters and "dramatic interplay between the story and surgery sections".
