= Job system =

Video game mechanic

In role-playing video games, a job system (also known as a class system) is a game mechanic that allows the player to change the character class of a given character at any point, often in response to specific challenges faced by the party, and may include the power to permanently learn class skills through grinding in order to create the ultimate character. The job system was introduced by the 1990 video game Final Fantasy III, and became a recurring element in the Final Fantasy series across multiple games and spinoffs, although it was also implemented in many other non-Final Fantasy role-playing games, including Trials of Mana, Octopath Traveler and Metaphor: ReFantazio, in which classes are represented by switchable magical transformations called archetypes. The system has been praised by critics for the freedom of choice it allows, though lackluster implementations of it have been called disappointing.

== History ==
While the job system first appeared in Final Fantasy III, it was most heavily popularized by Final Fantasy V (1992), a game that introduced more than two dozen jobs, many of which would go on to become series staples, such as the Time Mage. Players were able to earn ability points from combat, eventually resulting in mastery of the job currently equipped, which enabled the use of its skills while in another job. This feature, absent from FFIII, gave players the freedom to combine jobs in a vast number of ways rather than have to equip one job at a time. Following its appearance in FFV, it was not used in any mainline series entry until Final Fantasy X-2 (2003).

Nevertheless, the system was also used in other games during the intervening time. Trials of Mana (1995) incorporated a version of the job system in which, upon reaching Level 18 with a character, players could choose whether to send a character down a "light" or "dark" path, locking half of their possible jobs and significantly changing the others. Players were locked to a class until a further class up at Level 38, which allowed them to change again. This forced players to commit to a certain job and become skilled with the particulars of the job combination they chose.

With only three main characters, FFX-2, a game notorious for its light-hearted tonal shift from its predecessor, utilized a costume-based job system to allow for major flexibility in spite of this. Yuna and her companions all possess Garment Grids that can be slotted with Dresspheres, the clothing of a certain job. These Dresspheres can even be swapped mid-battle in a transformation sequence, giving the character the abilities of the job whose clothes they are wearing. The game includes more than a dozen jobs, such as Gun Mage, Samurai, and Songstress.

Lightning Returns: Final Fantasy XIII reintroduced the system as the "Style-Change Active Time Battle System", and incorporated ATB elements directly into job changes, outright requiring the protagonist Lightning to swap between costumes, called Schema, mid-battle in order to recharge their power.

While the original, failed release of Final Fantasy XIV (2010) initially lacked a job system, it had an "armoury system" in its place, allowing for multiple classes to be played on a single character in contrast to other MMORPGs at the time where characters were typically locked to a single combat class. A post-launch update expanded the armoury system to include Final Fantasy jobs, while its replacement initially subtitled A Realm Reborn (2013) included it at launch. Jobs included in post-launch expansion packs were initially also based on existing Final Fantasy jobs, but eventually diversified and took inspiration from other sources, such as the Gunbreaker job being centered around their gunblade weapons that originally appeared in Final Fantasy VIII, and the Pictomancer job having previously existed as an exclusive job for Final Fantasy VI character Relm Arrowny.

== Reception ==
Paul Shkreli of RPG Site described the job system from FFV onwards as "iconic" and allowing for "endless job combinations". He especially praised its implementation in FFX-2, calling it seemingly simple, yet highly complex. William Hughes of The A.V. Club praised the job system's implementation in games such as Final Fantasy Tactics (1997) as "incredibly empowering", encouraging players to "crack the games' challenge curve completely open" by finding the perfect skill combination, but expressed frustration that more recent examples, including Yakuza: Like a Dragon (2020) and Bravely Default II (2021), were balanced to the point of losing their "game-destroying combos" out of fear of "bad design".

Alana Hagues of Nintendo Life called Trials of Mana's job system "absolutely delightful", remarking that its restrictions made it more interesting.
