= Trauma Center: New Blood =

2007 surgical simulation video game

- Cover art for the PAL and Japanese versions, showing the main cast
- Developer: Atlus (Note: Additional development by Media.Vision)
- Publishers: NA: Atlus USA; JP: Atlus; PAL: Nintendo
- Director: Daisuke Kanada
- Designers: Taku Aoyagi; Akira Odagaki; Takashi Kato
- Programmer: Takaaki Ikeda
- Artist: Masayuki Doi
- Writer: Shogo Isogai
- Composers: Kenichi Tsuchiya; Atsushi Kitajoh
- Series: Trauma Center
- Platform: Wii
- Release: NA: November 20, 2007; JP: January 17, 2008; EU: November 7, 2008; AU: January 22, 2009
- Genres: Simulation, visual novel
- Modes: Single-player, multiplayer

Trauma Center: New Blood (Note: Caduceus: New Blood (カドゥケウス ニューブラッド, Kadukeusu: Nyū Buraddo)) is a simulation video game developed by Atlus for the Wii. The third entry in the Trauma Center series, the game was published in North America in 2007 by Atlus, and in other regions in 2008 by Atlus (Japan) and Nintendo (Europe and Australia). The story follows doctors Markus Vaughn and Valerie Blaylock, each holding a supernatural ability called the Healing Touch, as they face a man-made parasitic virus called Stigma. Gameplay combines surgical simulation with a story told as a visual novel, with operations controlled exclusively using the Wii Remote and Nunchuk.

Development of New Blood began following the completion of Trauma Center: Second Opinion. The North American setting and overall narrative was influenced by the staff of Atlus USA, based on the series' overseas success. Development was supported by Media.Vision. While using many of the systems created for Second Opinion, the staff focused on adding full voice acting and multiplayer. The game met with generally positive reviews; praise was given to its gameplay and cooperative function, but reactions to the story were mixed, and several faulted its high difficulty. It was also described as a commercial success, selling 300,000 copies in North America.

== Gameplay ==
An operation from New Blood, performed by two players in the game's co-op mode

Trauma Center: New Blood is a video game that combines surgical simulation gameplay missions, ranging from story-based to optional challenge missions, with storytelling employing non-interactive visual novel segments using static scenes and voiced dialogue. Players take on the roles of protagonists Markus Vaughn and Valerie Blaylock, surgeons with a mystical ability called the Healing Touch. Each operation tasks players with curing the patient of their ailment within a time limit. Missions can be played on different difficulty settings.

Operations range from treating surface wounds and extraction operations to organ transplants and repairing broken bones, in addition to procedures new to the Trauma Center series such as skin grafts and fixing electronic devices. Several operations pit the protagonists against an artificial disease known as Stigma, with several strains being highly mobile and requiring multiple tools to defeat. Actions during surgery are guided using the Nunchuk. The Wii Remote is used for many actions including stitching up wounds and using the scalpel. Operating tools are selected from a radial options menu using the Nunchuk's control stick. Multiple surgical tools are required for different operations and injuries; players may need to drain blood pools obstructing the operating area, use a surgical laser to treat small tumors or boils, forceps to close wounds and remove foreign objects, and sutures to sew up both wounds and incisions. The player must frequently apply antibiotic gel to treat minor injuries and prevent infection. Patients going into cardiac arrest must be either revived with the defibrillator, or receive heart massages.

The Healing Touch can be activated by drawing a star on the screen with the Wii Remote. The Healing Touch ability of each doctor is different; Markus can stop time for a limited period which can allow the boosting of vitals and the performance of medical procedures without risking a patient's health depleting, and Valerie can stabilise patients and prevent their health from depleting for a limited time while being unable to boost it. In addition to single-player, a local two-person multiplayer option is available, allowing two people to work together during operations with separate pairs of Wii controllers. Each action by the player is graded based upon speed and accuracy, along with the doctor selected and whether co-op was used. An overall ranking is delivered at the end of each mission based on both these factors and hidden modifiers specific to each operation. Players can post their scores on online leaderboards through the Nintendo Wi-Fi Connection.

== Synopsis ==
Set a decade after the events of Trauma Center: Second Opinion, New Blood follows doctors Markus Vaughn and Valerie Blaylock. Initially stationed in Alaska, where Vaughn lives in a self-imposed exile at the local hospital, a visit for surgery by nurse Elena Salazar prompts Markus and Valerie to be recalled to the Concordia Medical Institute in Los Angeles. Markus's mentor Professor Wilkins has been infected with a new parasitic disease he dubs Stigma, and due to their Healing Touch abilities Markus and Valerie are the best candidates for removing it. While the operation is successful, Concordia is attacked by an unknown group and Wilkins kidnapped during the chaos. In the wake of this and further cases of Stigma being diagnosed, Markus and Valerie are drafted into a dedicated unit at the USA branch of Caduceus, a semi-covert group dedicated to curing intractable diseases. During their initial stay and work, Stigma is kept a secret from the public, but are forced to reveal it following an incident on a live surgery TV show. Further research into Stigma reveals that it needs a metal called Culurium to survive; the metal is used extensively in medical equipment, meaning its use has been unwittingly spreading the disease.

Shortly after this, Markus, Valerie and Elena are kidnapped by the Kidman family, leaders of the terrorist group Parnassus who are promoting the spread of Stigma. One of the Kidman Family leaders is recognised by Markus as Wilkins. During their captivity, Markus reveals that he created Stigma during cancer experiments with rats, and fled to Alaska after Wilkins resisted destroying Stigma to gain fame through its discovery and research. The three escape, and are eventually sent on a mission to the country of Culuruma—the source of Culurium—to combat a Stigma outbreak. Culuruma is rocked by a guerrilla uprising and a Stigma outbreak, both sponsored by Parnassus. The Kidman leader is killed as the guerrillas are suppressed, and it is revealed that Stigma is both occurring around the world and evolving past the point where it needs Culurium. Back in the US, Caduceus and the FBI collaborate on the investigation, though Caduceus's efforts are impeded by the disappearance of staff member Cynthia Kasakov.

Wilkins is found at another Parnassues base, revealed to have been manipulated using an electronic device attached to his brain. Once removed, Wilkins returns to normal, remembering nothing since his initial Stigma operation. Information at the base reveals Parnassus's leader is Master Vakhushti, who under another name was known to Valerie as Cynthia's boyfriend. Locating Cynthia in Central Asia, Markus and Valerie learn that she is being controlled by Vakhushti using a medical implant on her heart when she tried talking him out of using Stigma. Once rescued, Cynthia leads them to Vakhushti's base, where they are forced to remove the final and most powerful Stigma strain from his body. A repentant Vakhushti reveals that Stigma altered his mind when he used it to combat his malign diencephalic syndrome. Following Vakhushti's death, Caduceus recovers his research for analysis, while Markus, Valerie and Elena continue their work.

== Development ==
New Blood was primarily developed by the team at Atlus responsible for the previous Trauma Center games, referred to internally as "CaduceTeam" and known for their love for gameplay-focused experiences. Additional work was done by Media.Vision, who designed the settings and background artwork. Nearly all the original staff from Second Opinion returned to develop New Blood, including scenario writer Shogo Isogai, director Daisuke Kanada, artist Masayuki Doi, and programmer Takaaki Ikeda. Taku Aoyagi, Akira Odagaki and Takashi Kato acted as lead designers.

Development of New Blood began shortly after the completion of Second Opinion. The team used player feedback from Second Opinion to inform the new game's design. While New Blood was designed as the continuation of the Trauma Center series, it was also aimed at series newcomers as it had a story separate from Under the Knife and new gameplay functions. The goal of mimicking and improving upon the original gameplay of Trauma Center was carried over into New Blood. As with Second Opinion, Kanada wanted to give the game a similar feel to classic titles like Space Harrier and Gradius. Isogai began collaborating on the scenario with Kanada from an early stage.

With an international release planned from the outset, the team consulted Atlus USA, who had two main suggestions. The first was that there should be both a male and female protagonist, and that the female—in addition to other female characters—should not be in inferior positions of power to their male counterparts. The second was that one of the protagonists should be dark-skinned, and again in an equal position of authority to the other protagonist. Atlus agreed to both of these points, resulting in the protagonists being equal working colleagues and Doi's designs for them reflecting their equality. The characters' names were provided by Atlus USA, with the Japanese staff finding them difficult to transliterate into Japanese. The story and gameplay themes were the battle to save lives and the precious nature of life. Multiplayer was included at the suggestion of Ikeda, based on feedback from Second Opinion and the decision to have two main characters. Ikeda created a working prototype over a few days, with full implementation happening after Kanada's approval. Another new addition was supporting widescreen 16:9 displays, as Second Opinion had only supported 4:3 ratio.

=== Audio ===
The music for New Blood was composed by Kenichi Tsuchiya and Atsushi Kitajoh. Tsuchiya, whose previous work included the Persona and Growlanser series, had worked on the Trauma Center series since the first game. Kitajoh was a newcomer to Trauma Center, whose previous notable work had been contributions to the soundtrack of Persona 3 FES. Several tracks were scored to reflect the personalities of certain characters. There were also tracks that used remixes of themes used in earlier Trauma Center games. During the music writing process, Kitajoh did several arrangements without consulting Tsuchiya, something he was used to with the general Atlus Sound Team. Tsuchiya remembered the music writing process as stressful but rewarding. The soundtrack was recorded at a studio on Yoyogi.

One of Kanada's wishes for New Blood was to include full voice acting in the game's story, something they could not do for Second Opinion or the original Trauma Center. Casting voice actors began before the character designs had been finalized, and in some cases an actor's performance influenced the design of their character portrait in story scenes. A few voice actors needed to take on multiple roles during a single recording session. A returning voice actor from Second Opinion was Takayuki Kondō, who had provided the voice for Derek Stiles. The Atlus team used their experience from voice recording for Second Opinion when handling recording sessions for New Blood.

== Release ==
New Blood was announced at the 2007 Electronic Entertainment Expo as one of Atlus's upcoming titles for that year. The game was localised into English by Atlus USA. While initially planned for simultaneous release in North America and Japan, the game was released first in North America on November 20, 2007. The English dub was handled by PCP Productions, who had worked with Atlus on the other Trauma Center titles. In Japan, the game was released on January 17, 2008 by Atlus. The game was supplemented in the region by a guidebook in January 2008, and a soundtrack album published by Tye Entertainment in February of the same year. The album was reissued digitally on streaming platforms in December 2025, the series' 20th anniversary. In Europe, the game was published by Nintendo on November 7. It was published in Australia on January 22, 2009.

== Reception ==
Reception

Aggregate scores
Aggregator	Score
GameRankings	76.95% (Note: Based on 41 reviews)
Metacritic	77/100 (43 reviews)

Review scores
Publication	Score
1Up.com	C
Eurogamer	8/10
Famitsu	31/40
Game Informer	7.5/10
GameSpot	8/10
GameSpy	2.5/5
IGN	8.5/10; 8.1/10 (Australia)
NGamer	8.4/10
Nintendo World Report	8.5/10
Official Nintendo Magazine	67%
PALGN	8/10
Play	7/10

Between its North American release and February 2008, New Blood sold over 250,000 units in the region. During its debut week in Japan, the game reached third place in sales charts. Despite this, it did not appear in Japanese gaming magazine Famitsu's top 500 best-selling titles for 2008, indicating sales of less than 19,000 units. By June 2009, the game had sold over 300,000 copies in North America. In an interview in early 2008, Atlus USA staff said that the game had met sales expectations. While it met with lower sales than Second Opinion, this was attributed to a crowded market, the game not being a console launch title, and its release close to Super Mario Galaxy.

The game was met with positive reviews from critics, earning a score of 77 out of 100 based on 43 reviews on aggregate website Metacritic. Two different IGN reviews, from Mark Bozon of the main website and James Cottee for the Australian website, praised it as an improvement over Second Opinion and a good continuation of the Trauma Center series. Martin Kitts, writing for Nintendo Gamer, said it was an ideal sequel for series fans. Game Revolution writer J Constantini felt that it worsened as many of Second Opinion's problems as it fixed, stating that people who played Second Opinion would feel comfortable with the controls. They found the gameplay less forgiving, stating that while it didn't "fulfill the promise" of Second Opinion, he had hope for the series. Jonathan Metts of Nintendo World Report praised it as a game accessible to both series veterans and newcomers, with his main complaints being the superficial leaderboard addition and North American cover art design. GameSpy's Bryan Stratton generally liked the technical improvements and cooperative play, but found its high single-player difficulty and lack of innovations off-putting. Video Game Music Online writer Chris Greening appreciated the Wii allowing the composers to create a more high-quality soundtrack compared to the DS entries in the series. He felt that some of the music was a cliché of past music in the series, but still considered them competently made.

The story met with a mixed response, with some finding it overly silly or lacking in originality. Game Informer's Matthew Kato called it "fun if you don't take it too seriously", while Heather Campbell, writing for Play Magazine, cited its fully-voiced narrative as the main draw for players. The graphics saw praise for their improvement over Second Opinion, though a few found the more realistic graphics lacking or uncomfortable to look at. Eurogamer's Keza MacDonald noted the toned-down graphic design as contributing to a more realistic tone, but felt the character design was "a bit uncanny".

The gameplay was generally praised as entertaining. The reviewers for Famitsu enjoyed the gameplay despite noting its similarity to Second Opinion, while Joe Dodson of GameSpot praised the gameplay and additions compared to earlier entries, but found other elements lacking or needing further improvement. PALGN's Adam Ghiggino, while noting some control issues activating the Healing Touch ability, enjoyed his time with it and felt it was worth buying for veterans and newcomers. Several reviews noted a lack of innovation from earlier entries. A few critics also cited it as being overly difficult. Official Nintendo Magazine's Tom East was less impressed than other reviewers, citing its high difficulty and controls as factors in this. Andrew Fitch of 1Up.com was fairly negative, finding the game too challenging to be enjoyable and called it unfair on casual players. The cooperative mode was met with general praise.
