= Trauma Center: Second Opinion =

2006 video game

- North American cover art showing the lead cast, with protagonists Derek Stiles and Naomi Kimishima in the center.
- Developer: Atlus
- Publishers: NA: Atlus USA; JP: Atlus; PAL: Nintendo
- Director: Daisuke Kanada
- Producer: Katsura Hashino
- Designer: Masayoshi Suto
- Programmer: Takaaki Ikeda
- Artist: Masayuki Doi
- Writer: Shogo Isogai
- Composers: Kenichi Tsuchiya; Shingo Yasumoto
- Series: Trauma Center
- Platform: Wii
- Release: NA: November 19, 2006; JP: December 2, 2006; EU: August 10, 2007; AU: August 28, 2008
- Genres: Simulation, visual novel
- Mode: Single-player

Trauma Center: Second Opinion (Note: Known in Japan as Kadukeusu Zetto: Futatsu no Chōshittō (カドゥケウスZ 2つの超執刀; lit. Caduceus Z: Two Super Surgical Operations)) is a simulation video game developed by Atlus for the Wii. The second entry in the Trauma Center series, Second Opinion is a remake of the Nintendo DS title Trauma Center: Under the Knife (2005). The game was released in North America and Japan in 2006 by Atlus as a console launch title, and in other regions in 2007 by Nintendo.

Set in a near future where medical science can cure previously incurable diseases, the story follows young surgeon Derek Stiles as he uses his mystical "Healing Touch" to treat a new disease dubbed GUILT. Second Opinion expands on the original narrative through the perspective of Naomi Kimishima, another doctor with the Healing Touch. Gameplay combines surgical simulation with a story told as a visual novel, with operations and control options reworked for the Wii hardware.

The game began development in early 2006. Production was stressful due to a small team and tight development period. The character Naomi was added to help set the game apart from the Nintendo DS original. The localization was done by Atlus USA, who focused on tightening the original script and merging it with the new narrative. The game was positively reviewed by journalists, who praised its implementation of the Wii control scheme. It was also a commercial success, selling over 400,000 units overseas.

== Gameplay ==
An operation in Second Opinion

Trauma Center: Second Opinion is a video game that combines surgical simulation gameplay with storytelling using non-interactive visual novel segments using static scenes, character portraits, text boxes, and rare voice clips during gameplay segments. Second Opinion is a remake of Trauma Center: Under the Knife for the Nintendo DS. Players take on the roles of original protagonist Derek Stiles and new character Naomi Kimishima. The two are surgeons with a mystical ability called the Healing Touch. Each operation tasks players with curing the patient of their ailment within a time limit. Missions can be played on different difficulty settings.

Surgery takes place from a first-person view. Operations range from treating surface wounds and extraction operations—carried over from the original—to new operations including organ transplants and repairing broken bones. Different surgical tools are required for different operations and injuries; players may need to drain blood pools obstructing the operating area, use a surgical laser to treat small tumors or boils, forceps to close wounds, and sutures to sew up both wounds and incisions. The player must frequently apply antibiotic gel to treat minor injuries and prevent infection. Actions during surgery are guided using the Wii Remote and Nunchuk. The Wii Remote is used for many actions including stitching up wounds and using the scalpel, filling the role of the stylus from the Nintendo DS original. New operating tools are selected from a radial options menu using the Nunchuk's control stick. Functions such as the forceps and defibrillator require using both controls in tandem.

Players can activate each character's Healing Touch by drawing a star on-screen using the Wii Remote. Using the Healing Touch during gameplay generates different effects depending on its user; Stiles can stop time, while Kimishima can replenish a patient's health with each successful action. Some operations include environmental hazards, such as one level where an operation takes place on a plane, with vibration caused by turbulence. Levels are cleared when the patient is saved, and lost if the patient's heart rate drops to zero or the time limit runs out. At the end of each operation, the player is graded on time taken and the precision of movement.

== Synopsis ==
Second Opinion retells the story of Derek Stiles, a young doctor with a mystical gift known as the Healing Touch; the world he inhabits is a near future Earth of 2018, where medical science has advanced to the point that previously major diseases such as AIDS and cancer are easily cured. Using his gift, Stiles cures a patient of a new manmade parasitic disease known as GUILT (Gangliated Utrophin Immuno Latency Toxin), distributed as a biological weapon by the medical terrorist group, Delphi. Joining the medical conglomerate Caduceus, Stiles uses his gift to treat those infected with GUILT, aided by his assistant Angela "Angie" Thompson. Stiles eventually confronts the core members of Delphi, including Angie's father, Kenneth Blackwell, who was coerced into assisting the group with their research. With Blackwell's aid, Caduceus launches a raid on Delphi's headquarters and discovers its founder, Adam. Adam is in a vegetative state, hosting all the GUILT strains, and the body is impounded by Caduceus Europe.

The new narrative of Second Opinion first follows Naomi Kimishima, living under the alias "Nozomi Weaver," a surgeon ostracized due to her Healing Touch. During her missions, it is revealed that she was working for Delphi, who knew of her ability and was using it for their own purposes. Kimishima remains mostly unaware of the circumstances of Delphi until just before the Caduceus raid, and also places their operation in danger at one point by insisting on operating on a reporter wounded after chasing down a car in which Kimishima and a Delphi operative were passengers. Just before their headquarters are discovered by Caduceus, Kimishima escapes with a GUILT sample which she plans to use as a bargaining chip for immunity against all potential charges against her.

In the new sixth chapter, Stiles is summoned to Caduceus Europe, where Kimishima now works under her real name alongside another doctor called Owen. It is revealed that Caduceus Europe have created a new regenerative culture dubbed "Z-Cells". Following a GUILT operation, Stiles is infected and Kimishima operates on him. Later a demonstration of the Z-Cell culture goes awry when the Z-Cells mutate into an airborne GUILT strain. Owen is revealed to be a Delphi member, and the Z-Cells derived from a serum extracted from Adam's body. Using their combined abilities, Stiles and Kimishima stop the GUILT outbreak and save the leader of Caduceus USA, Robert Hoffman. Caduceus Europe is forced to face charges for their actions, Kimishima stays in Europe to pursue her medical career and to compensate for her crimes while working under Delphi, and Stiles spearheads a new drive to eradicate the GUILT pandemic.

== Development ==
Second Opinion is the second game in the Trauma Center series and the first produced for the Wii. Following the release of the first game in 2005, original producer Katsura Hashino tasked a few team members from Under the Knife with forming a new development team that would continue the series. This group was known as "CaduceTeam", and was made up of what director Daisuke Kanada described as Atlus's most enthusiastic gamers. Kanada had previously been a designer for multiple Megami Tensei titles, had worked with Hashino since Maken X (1999), and made his debut as a director with Second Opinion. Hashino co-directed with Hiroshi Kato. Lead programmer Takaaki Ikeda would work on future Trauma Center titles, while future Persona 5 art director Masayoshi Suto was lead designer. Planning for Second Opinion began in January 2006.

The game was rebuilt from the ground up, using none of the original source code. In addition to new tools such as the defibrillator, the original tools such as forceps were carried over and adjusted to fit the new control scheme of the Wii. The character artwork was redrawn by Masayuki Doi. The character designs were altered to appear "mature" without losing their anime aesthetic, and the operation segments were made "cooler" in appearance. Internal organs were given more realistic shapes, but it still retained a stylised look without "gory or disgusting" detail. The game does not support a 16:9 screen ratio as this would have required a lot of programming as the entire screen was the gameplay area. Kenichi Tsuchiya, who worked on the original Trauma Center, returned to create new tracks and arrangements for Second Opinion. Original composer Shoji Meguro acted as sound director. Another composer on the project was Shingo Yasumoto, who had worked on Persona 3 for Atlus and multiple games for Grasshopper Manufacture. The game was produced in a very short time, putting a great deal of stress on the small team of developers. In addition to the Japanese team, Atlus USA was asked for creative input on the control scheme. Adjustable difficulty levels were included based on feedback about the high difficulty of the original game.

When creating the plans, the team were faced with the difficulties of differentiating the remake from the original. They needed to add features to both make that distinction and draw in new players. This led to the creation of a second doctor who would have new operations and expand the story. They first created a "dark" counterpart to Stiles, who would wear black clothing. This initial sketch ran into problems as the premise closely resembled a supporting character from both Trauma Center and Second Opinion. During talks with scenario writer Shogo Isogai, the team fleshed out the idea of a second doctor who was driven by business rather than passion. The darker aspect of the new narrative was also reworked to show the damaging effects of surgery when used for the wrong purposes. The team decided to make the new doctor a woman who was exiled from the medical profession, and Naomi Kimishima was born. While a more ambiguous character, she was—like Stiles—still driven by a passion to help people. Kanada attributed the character's strong impression in the game's Japanese version to the work of Naomi's voice actress Akeno Watanabe. While voice acting was still restricted to shout-outs from characters, there were ten times the number compared to the Nintendo DS original, and Stiles was given a voice for the first time.

== Release ==
The game was announced in May 2006 at that year's Electronic Entertainment Expo as a launch title for the Wii. In Japan, it was originally known under the tentative title Caduceus Neo. For the localization, Atlus USA went through the original script and tightened the dialogue. New elements were added to the original script so it flowed smoothly into the new narrative. The English subtitle references both the game's status as the second Trauma Center and to distinguish it from the original, with Second Opinion being picked over titles like "Relapsed" due to the former's relation to the added features and new character. The setting change from Japan to North America was preserved for Second Opinion. The lead protagonist's name change from Kosuke Tsukimori to Derek Stiles was also retained. As with Stile's name in the Nintendo DS version, Kimishima's original surname "Weaver" was written by Atlus USA as a pun on the word "Wii". The need to produce the Western version alongside the Japanese version put extra pressure on the development team. The English dub was handled by PCP Productions, who had worked on the original game. The game released in North America on November 19, 2006, releasing concurrently with the Wii console in the region. In Japan, the game released on December 2 of that year alongside the Wii's launch in the region. A guidebook for the title was published by Enterbrain in January 2007. The game was published in Europe by Nintendo on August 10, 2007, nine months after the game's North American release. In Australia, Second Opinion released on August 28, 2008. A digital soundtrack album was released in December 2025, the series' 20th anniversary.

== Reception ==
Reception

Aggregate scores
Aggregator	Score
GameRankings	80.64% (Note: Based on 56 reviews)
Metacritic	80/100 (49 reviews)

Review scores
Publication	Score
1Up.com	C+
Computer and Video Games	8.4/10
Eurogamer	9/10
Famitsu	32/40
GameSpot	8/10
GameSpy	4.5/5
GamesRadar+	4.5/5
GameTrailers	8.2/10
IGN	8/10
Nintendo World Report	8.5/10
Official Nintendo Magazine	84%

During November 2007, Second Opinion was among the better-selling Wii titles for the period, selling around 200,000 units in North America. In January the following year, it was still in the top ten best-selling Wii games of the region. The game met with slow sales in Japan, reaching just over 23,400 units by the end of 2006. Kanada stated in October 2007 that sales for Japan were quite low, although feedback from players was enthusiastic. In the UK, the game debuted at seventeenth place in the charts as one of only two new releases during that week. Index Corporation, owner of Atlus at the time, announced in October 2008 that the game had sold around 400,000 copies in North America and Europe. Review aggregate Metacritic found that the game received "generally favorable" reviews, and it was regarded as one of the best Wii games by GamePro.

Japanese gaming magazine Famitsu enjoyed the gameplay, but noted an emotional disconnect from patients due to the game's graphical style and minimal interaction. 1UP.com's Andrew Fitch called Second Opinion a "surprisingly decent transition" from the original despite several faults with the presentation. Computer and Video Games called it "One of the tightest, and best, games available on Wii." Keza MacDonald, writing for Eurogamer, was highly positive; she said that Second Opinion would help dispel scepticism regarding the Wii's motion control functions. Eric Bratcher of GamesRadar regarded the game as the second essential game for Wii owners after The Legend of Zelda: Twilight Princess.

Greg Kasavin of GameSpot called Second Opinion "about as unorthodox of a launch title for a new game system as they come", generally praising the game in several areas. GameSpy's Bryn Williams felt that, despite an occasional lack of polish, the game was an essential purchase for Wii owners. Mark Bozon of IGN felt that the game was doing for the Wii what the original did for the Nintendo DS in terms of control innovation. Nintendo World Report's Jonathan Metts was also very positive, praising how the game fixed balancing issues present in the Nintendo DS original while adding new and enjoyable content. Tom East of Official Nintendo Magazine liked the implementation of the Wii's controls, saying that the game played to the console's strengths. Game Revolution staff appreciated the visual improvement over the Nintendo DS version, though speculated that a quick development was responsible for minimal character portraits and a lack of voice acting. They enjoyed the Wii Remote controls, considering it an upgrade over the DS' stylus, but begrudged content recycled from the first game and the lack of multiplayer.

General opinion was positive about the implementation of the Wii motion controls, and how this improved on the control scheme and difficulty of the Nintendo DS original. (Note: GameSpot, Official Nintendo Magazine, Eurogamer, IGN.) A contrasting opinion was Metts, who found the controls unreliable for some functions such as activating the Healing Touch. The story was seen as either good or serviceable, with many noting its melodramatic tone and simplistic delivery. (Note: GameSpot, 1Up.com, Computer and Video Games, GamesRadar, IGN.) The presentation was also praised despite its simplistic style. A lack of widescreen support was a recurring criticism from Western reviewers. Difficulty spikes were also criticised by multiple outlets. (Note: GameSpot, 1Up.com, Official Nintendo Magazine, Famitsu, GamesRadar.) Writing for The New York Times, Charles Herold was unable to finish the game, finding it too difficult. He felt that, while it was fun and worth playing, he "never fell in love with it" due to the challenge.
