= List of Atlus games =

This is a list of video games developed, published or distributed by Atlus, a Japanese video game developer, publishing company and arcade manufacturer. They are known for Japanese role-playing games internationally, with Megami Tensei and Persona being its flagship franchises, as well as Print Club (Purikura) arcade machines in East Asia.

| Title | Platform | Original release date | Developer(s) |
|---|---|---|---|
| Ginga Denshō: Galaxy Odyssey | Famicom Disk System | November 6, 1986 | Atlus |
| Digital Devil Story: Megami Tensei | FM-7 | 1987 | Atlus |
| Digital Devil Story: Megami Tensei | Famicom | September 11, 1987 | Atlus |
| The Karate Kid | NES | November 1987 | Atlus |
| Gotcha! The Sport! | NES | 1987 | Atlus |
| Town & Country Surf Designs: Wood & Water Rage | NES | February 1988 | Atlus |
| Erika to Satoru no Yume Bōken | Famicom | September 27, 1988 | Atlus |
| Xexyz | NES | 1988 | Atlus |
| King of Kings | Famicom | 1988 | Atlus |
| NFL | NES | 1988 | Atlus |
| Friday the 13th | NES | February 1989 | Atlus |
| Dungeon Explorer | TurboGrafx-16 | March 4, 1989 | Atlus |
| Kwirk | Game Boy | November 24, 1989 | Atlus |
| Bonk's Adventure | TurboGrafx-16 | 1989 | Atlus |
| Digital Devil Story: Megami Tensei II | Famicom | April 6, 1990 | Atlus |
| Cosmo Tank | Game Boy | July 8, 1990 | Atlus |
| Puzzle Boys | Famicom Disk System | August 1990 | Atlus |
| Legendary Axe II | TurboGrafx-16 | September 7, 1990 | Atlus |
| Pocket Stadium | Game Boy | December 1990 | Atlus |
| Battle Fleet | Famicom | 1990 | Atlus |
| Jantei Monogatari | PC Engine CD-ROM² | 1990 | Atlus |
| Spud's Adventure | Game Boy | January 25, 1991 | Atlus |
| Jantei Monogatari | Mega Drive | March 29, 1991 | Atlus |
| Rockin' Kats | NES | April 5, 1991 | Atlus |
| Quiz Marugoto The World | PC Engine CD-ROM² | April 1991 | Atlus |
| Amazing Tater | Game Boy | August 2, 1991 | Atlus |
| Somer Assault | TurboGrafx-16 | October 4, 1991 | Atlus |
| Wacky Races | NES | December 25, 1991 | Atlus |
| Jantei Monogatari 2: Uchuu Tantei Deiban | PC Engine CD-ROM² | February 28, 1992 | Atlus |
| Quiz Marugoto The World II | PC Engine CD-ROM² | March 27, 1992 | Atlus |
| BlaZeon | Super NES | July 24, 1992 | Atlus |
| Armored Police Metal Jack | Super Famicom | July 31, 1992 | Atlus |
| Shin Megami Tensei | Super Famicom | October 30, 1992 | Atlus |
| Shin Megami Tensei | PC Engine CD-ROM² | December 25, 1993 | Opera House |
| Shin Megami Tensei | Mega CD | February 25, 1994 | SIMS |
| Shin Megami Tensei | PlayStation | May 31, 2001 | Atlus |
| Shin Megami Tensei | Game Boy Advance | March 28, 2003 | Atlus |
| Shin Megami Tensei | iOS | February 23, 2012 | Atlus |
| Shin Megami Tensei | Android | November 1, 2012 | Atlus |
| Widget | NES | November 1992 | Atlus |
| Megami Tensei Gaiden: Last Bible | Game Boy | December 25, 1992 | Multimedia Intelligence Transfer |
| BlaZeon | Arcade | 1992 | AI |
| Run Saber | Super NES | June 8, 1993 | Hori Electric |
| GP-1 | Super NES | June 25, 1993 | Genki |
| Super Widget | Super NES | September 1993 | Atlus |
| Megami Tensei Gaiden: Last Bible II | Game Boy | November 19, 1993 | Multimedia Intelligence Transfer |
| Oh My God! | Arcade | 1993 | Atlus |
| Power Instinct | Arcade | 1993 | Atlus |
| Majin Tensei | Super Famicom | January 28, 1994 | Atlus |
| Kabuki Rocks | Super Famicom | March 4, 1994 | Red Company |
| Shin Megami Tensei II | Super Famicom | March 18, 1994 | Atlus |
| Megami Tensei Gaiden: Last Bible | Game Gear | April 22, 1994 | Multimedia Intelligence Transfer |
| Jantei Monogatari 3: Saver Angel | PC Engine CD-ROM² | April 23, 1994 | Natsume Co., Ltd. |
| Power Instinct | Super NES | October 14, 1994 | Atlus |
| Shin Megami Tensei if... | Super Famicom | October 28, 1994 | Atlus |
| GP-1: Part II | Super NES | November 18, 1994 | Genki |
| Power Instinct | Sega Genesis | November 18, 1994 | Atlus |
| Hebereke no Popoon | Arcade | 1994 | Sunsoft |
| Naname De Magic! | Arcade | 1994 | Atlus |
| Power Instinct 2 | Arcade | 1994 | Atlus |
| Print Club | Arcade | February 1995 | Atlus |
| Majin Tensei II: Spiral Nemesis | Super Famicom | February 19, 1995 | Atlus |
| Majin Tensei II: Spiral Nemesis | Windows | May 11, 2006 | i-revo |
| Megami Tensei Gaiden: Another Bible | Game Boy | March 3, 1995 | Multimedia Intelligence Transfer |
| Megami Tensei Gaiden: Last Bible III | Super Famicom | March 4, 1995 | Multimedia Intelligence Transfer |
| Last Bible Special | Game Gear | March 24, 1995 | Sega |
| Kyūyaku Megami Tensei | Super Famicom | March 31, 1995 | Opera House |
| Kat's Run: Zen-Nippon K Car Senshuken | Super Famicom | July 14, 1995 | Varie |
| Jack Bros. | Virtual Boy | September 29, 1995 | Atlus |
| Gouketsuji Ichizoku 2: Chotto Dake Saikyou Densetsu | PlayStation | October 20, 1995 | Atlus |
| High Velocity: Mountain Racing Challenge | Sega Saturn | November 10, 1995 | Cave |
| Gunbird | PlayStation | December 15, 1995 | Psikyo |
| Tetsudō O '96: Ikuze Okuban Chōja | PlayStation | December 15, 1995 | Atlus |
| Gunbird | Sega Saturn | December 15, 1995 | Psikyo |
| Seijuu Maden: Beasts & Blades | Super Famicom | December 15, 1995 | Atlus |
| Shin Megami Tensei: Devil Summoner | Sega Saturn | December 25, 1995 | Atlus |
| DonPachi | Arcade | 1995 | Cave |
| Gogetsuji Legends | Arcade | 1995 | Atlus |
| Pro Kishi Jinsei Simulation: Shōgi no Hanamichi | Super Famicom | February 16, 1996 | Access |
| My Best Friends: St. Andrew Jogakuen Hen | Sega Saturn | March 22, 1996 | Opera House |
| DonPachi | Sega Saturn | April 26, 1996 | Cave |
| Strikers 1945 | Sega Saturn | June 28, 1996 | Psikyo |
| Strikers 1945 | PlayStation | July 19, 1996 | Psikyo |
| Revelations: Persona | PlayStation | September 20, 1996 | Atlus |
| Purikura Daisakusen | Arcade | October 1996 | Atlus |
| Purikura Daisakusen | Sega Saturn | November 15, 1996 | Atlus |
| DigiCro: Digital Number Crossword | Sega Saturn | November 1, 1996 | Atlus |
| Sengoku Blade | Sega Saturn | November 22, 1996 | Atlus |
| Heaven's Gate | PlayStation | December 13, 1996 | Racdym |
| Galeoz | PlayStation | December 20, 1996 | Pre Stage |
| Imadoki no Vampire: Bloody Bride | PlayStation | December 20, 1996 | Jorudan |
| Cannon Dancer | Arcade | 1996 | Mitchell Corporation |
| DoDonPachi | Arcade | 1996 | Cave |
| Heaven's Gate | Arcade | 1996 | Racdym |
| Peak Performance | PlayStation | January 24, 1997 | Cave |
| Giten Megami Tensei: Tokyo Mokushiroku | PC-98 | April 4, 1997 | Atlus |
| Touge: King the Spirits 2 | Sega Saturn | April 18, 1997 | Cave |
| Groove on Fight | Sega Saturn | May 16, 1997 | Atlus |
| Minakata Hakudō Tōjō | PlayStation | August 7, 1997 | Atlus |
| Nanpō Hakudō Tōjō | Sega Saturn | August 7, 1997 | Atlus |
| DoDonPachi | Sega Saturn | August 18, 1997 | Cave |
| Tetsudō O 2 | PlayStation | September 25, 1997 | Atlus |
| Car & Driver Presents: Grand Tour Racing '98 | PlayStation | September 30, 1997 | Eutechnyx |
| Purikura Pocket | Game Boy | October 17, 1997 | Atlus |
| Ronde | Sega Saturn | October 30, 1997 | Multimedia Intelligence Transfer |
| Purikura Pocket 2 | Game Boy | November 11, 1997 | Atlus |
| Devil Summoner: Soul Hackers | Sega Saturn | November 13, 1997 | Atlus |
| Princess Crown | Sega Saturn | December 11, 1997 | Atlus |
| Snowboard Kids | Nintendo 64 | December 12, 1997 | Racdym |
| DoDonPachi Campaign Version | Arcade | 1997 | Cave |
| Groove on Fight | Arcade | 1997 | Atlus |
| Snow Break | PlayStation | January 29, 1998 | Toka |
| Final Round | PlayStation | March 12, 1998 | Kuusoukagaku |
| Kartia: The Word of Fate | PlayStation | March 26, 1998 | Atlus |
| Hellnight | PlayStation | June 11, 1998 | Dennou Eizou Seisakusho |
| Sol Divide | PlayStation | July 2, 1998 | Boom |
| Sol Divide | Sega Saturn | July 2, 1998 | Psikyo |
| Trap Gunner | PlayStation | August 6, 1998 | Racdym |
| Touge Max 2 | PlayStation | September 17, 1998 | Cave |
| Advan Racing | PlayStation | November 19, 1998 | Atlus |
| Thousand Arms | PlayStation | December 17, 1998 | Red Entertainment, TOSE |
| Purikura Pocket 3 | Game Boy | December 18, 1998 | Atlus |
| ESP Ra.De. | Arcade | 1998 | Cave |
| Snowboard Kids Plus | PlayStation | January 21, 1999 | Racdym |
| Snowboard Kids 2 | Nintendo 64 | February 19, 1999 | Racdym |
| Hamster Paradise | Game Boy Color | February 26, 1999 | Shimada Kikaku |
| Revelations: The Demon Slayer | Game Boy Color | March 19, 1999 | Multimedia Intelligence Transfer |
| Devil Summoner: Soul Hackers | PlayStation | April 8, 1999 | Atlus |
| Megami Tensei Gaiden: Last Bible II | Game Boy Color | April 16, 1999 | Multimedia Intelligence Transfer |
| Persona 2: Innocent Sin | PlayStation | June 24, 1999 | Atlus |
| GuruGuru Garakutaz | Game Boy Color | September 10, 1999 | Multimedia Intelligence Transfer |
| Pokeler | PlayStation | October 28, 1999 | Atlus |
| Maken X | Dreamcast | October 31, 1999 | Atlus |
| Growlanser | PlayStation | November 25, 1999 | Career Soft |
| Guwange | Arcade | 1999 | Cave |
| Touge Max G | PlayStation | January 13, 2000 | Cave |
| Hamster Paradise 2 | Game Boy Color | March 17, 2000 | Shimada Kikaku |
| Meka Pokeler | PlayStation | April 20, 2000 | Atlus |
| Sno Pokeler | PlayStation | April 20, 2000 | Atlus |
| Pokeler DX Black | PlayStation | April 20, 2000 | Atlus |
| Pokeler DX Pink | PlayStation | April 20, 2000 | Atlus |
| Primal Image | PlayStation 2 | April 27, 2000 | Atlus |
| Persona 2: Eternal Punishment | PlayStation | June 29, 2000 | Atlus |
| Tanimura Hitoshi no Don Quixote ga Iku | Game Boy Color | August 11, 2000 | Atlus |
| deSPIRIA | Dreamcast | September 21, 2000 | Dennou Eizou Seisakusho |
| Shin Megami Tensei: Devil Children - Aka no Sho | Game Boy Color | November 17, 2000 | Multimedia Intelligence Transfer |
| Shin Megami Tensei: Devil Children - Kuro no Sho | Game Boy Color | November 17, 2000 | Multimedia Intelligence Transfer |
| Guruguru Town Hanamaru-kun | PlayStation | December 14, 2000 | Aspect (production); Fupac (programming, graphics, sound) |
| Hello Kitty no Oshaberi Town | PlayStation | December 14, 2000 | Atlus |
| Happy! Happy!! Boarders | PlayStation 2 | December 14, 2000 | Atlus |
| Hamster Paradise 3 | Game Boy Color | December 15, 2000 | Digital Kids |
| Eithea | PlayStation | February 22, 2001 | TamTam |
| Super Dodge Ball Advance | Game Boy Advance | March 21, 2001 | Million Co. Ltd. |
| Maken Shao: Demon Sword | PlayStation 2 | June 7, 2001 | Atlus |
| Growlanser II: The Sense of Justice | PlayStation 2 | July 26, 2001 | Career Soft |
| Shin Megami Tensei: Devil Children - Shiro no Sho | Game Boy Color | July 27, 2001 | Multimedia Intelligence Transfer |
| Shin Megami Tensei Trading Card: Card Summoner | Game Boy Color | July 27, 2001 | Multimedia Intelligence Transfer |
| Hamster Paradise 4 | Game Boy Color | September 28, 2001 | Digital Kids |
| Hello Kitty no Oshaberi ABC | PlayStation | October 11, 2001 | Atlus |
| Road Rage 3 | PlayStation 2 | October 11, 2001 | Cave |
| Kuma no Pooh-san: Mori no Nakamato 123 | PlayStation | November 15, 2001 | Atlus |
| Mickey to Nakamatachi: Kazuasobi Iro Iro | PlayStation | November 15, 2001 | Atlus |
| Disney's Winnie the Pooh: Preschool | PlayStation | December 6, 2001 | Hi Corp |
| Growlanser III: The Dual Darkness | PlayStation 2 | December 6, 2001 | Career Soft |
| EX Okuman Chōja Game | PlayStation 2 | December 27, 2001 | Takara Tomy |
| Learn with Winnie the Pooh | PlayStation | February 7, 2002 | Hi Corp |
| My Disney Kitchen | PlayStation | February 7, 2002 | Atlus |
| Shin Megami Tensei II | PlayStation | March 20, 2002 | Atlus |
| Shin Megami Tensei: Devil Children | PlayStation | March 28, 2002 | Atlus |
| Hamster Paradise Advanchu | Game Boy Advance | July 19, 2002 | Digital Kids |
| Kids Station: Plarail Tetsudō Monoshiri Hyakka | PlayStation | November 14, 2002 | Atlus |
| DemiKids: Dark Version | Game Boy Advance | November 14, 2002 | Multimedia Intelligence Transfer |
| DemiKids: Light Version | Game Boy Advance | November 14, 2002 | Multimedia Intelligence Transfer |
| Kids Station: Ugoku Tomika Zukan | PlayStation | November 15, 2002 | Atlus |
| Shin Megami Tensei: Nine | Xbox | December 5, 2002 | Nex Entertainment |
| Nijiiro Dodge Ball | PlayStation | December 12, 2002 | Million Co. Ltd. |
| Touge R | Xbox | December 12, 2002 | Cave |
| Shin Megami Tensei if... | PlayStation | December 26, 2002 | Atlus |
| Shin Megami Tensei: Nocturne | PlayStation 2 | February 20, 2003 | Atlus |
| 2003-Toshi Kaimaku: Ganbare Kyūkaiō | PlayStation 2 | May 15, 2003 | Atlus |
| Hamster Paradise: Pure Heart | Game Boy Advance | July 11, 2003 | Digital Kids |
| Shin Megami Tensei: Devil Children - Puzzle de Call! | Game Boy Advance | July 25, 2003 | Atlus |
| Shin Megami Tensei: Devil Children 2 - Honō no Sho | Game Boy Advance | September 12, 2003 | Atlus |
| Shin Megami Tensei: Devil Children 2 - Kōri no Sho | Game Boy Advance | September 12, 2003 | Atlus |
| Shin Megami Tensei II | Game Boy Advance | September 26, 2003 | Atlus |
| EX Jinsei Game II | PlayStation 2 | November 6, 2003 | Takara Tomy |
| Busin 0: Wizardry Alternative Neo | PlayStation 2 | November 13, 2003 | Racjin |
| Double Dragon Advance | Game Boy Advance | November 14, 2003 | Million |
| Growlanser IV: Wayfarer of Time | PlayStation 2 | December 18, 2003 | Career Soft |
| Shin Megami Tensei: Nocturne Maniax | PlayStation 2 | January 29, 2004 | Atlus |
| Gunbird Special Edition | PlayStation 2 | February 19, 2004 | Psikyo |
| Casino | NTT DoCoMo | February 26, 2004 | Atlus |
| Digital Devil Story: Megami Tensei | Mobile phones | February 26, 2004 | Atlus |
| River City Ransom EX | Game Boy Advance | March 5, 2004 | Million |
| Shin Megami Tensei: if... Hazama's Chapter | Mobile phones | May 26, 2004 | Atlus |
| Shin Megami Tensei: Digital Devil Saga | PlayStation 2 | July 15, 2004 | Atlus |
| Battle B-Daman | Game Boy Advance | August 5, 2004 | Atlus |
| Shin Megami Tensei: 20XX | Mobile phones | August 26, 2004 | Atlus |
| Kuryū Yōma Gakuenki | PlayStation 2 | September 16, 2004 | Killaware |
| Stella Deus: The Gate of Eternity | PlayStation 2 | October 28, 2004 | Pinegrow |
| Shin Megami Tensei: Devil Children - Messiah Riser | Game Boy Advance | November 4, 2004 | Rocket Company |
| New Jinsei Game | PlayStation 2 | December 2, 2004 | Atlus |
| Jack's Kuesu to Akuma o Tasuke Tai | NTT DoCoMo | December 16, 2004 | Atlus |
| Shin Megami Tensei: Digital Devil Saga 2 | PlayStation 2 | January 27, 2005 | Atlus |
| Shinseiki Yūsha Taisen | PlayStation 2 | February 17, 2005 | WinkySoft |
| Growlanser IV: Wayfarer of the Time - Return | PlayStation 2 | March 10, 2005 | Career Soft |
| Trauma Center: Under the Knife | Nintendo DS | June 16, 2005 | Atlus |
| Battle B-Daman: Fire Spirits! | Game Boy Advance | August 5, 2005 | Atlus |
| Kunio-kun Nekketsu Collection | Game Boy Advance | August 25, 2005 | Million |
| Princess Crown | PlayStation Portable | September 22, 2005 | Atlus |
| Kunio-kun Nekketsu Collection 2 | Game Boy Advance | October 27, 2005 | Million |
| Miracle! Panzō: Nanatsu no Hoshi no Uchū Kaizoku | Game Boy Advance | November 3, 2005 | Atlus |
| SBK: Snowboard Kids | Nintendo DS | November 22, 2005 | In-Glove .Co |
| Shin Megami Tensei: Devil Summoner | PlayStation Portable | December 20, 2005 | Atlus |
| Kunio-kun Nekketsu Collection 3 | Game Boy Advance | February 16, 2006 | Million |
| Devil Summoner: Raidou Kuzunoha vs. the Soulless Army | PlayStation 2 | March 2, 2006 | Atlus |
| Shin Megami Tensei Pinball: Judgement | Mobile phones | March 3, 2006 | KAZe |
| Persona 3 | PlayStation 2 | July 13, 2006 | Atlus |
| Jinsei Game DS | Nintendo DS | July 27, 2006 | Takara Tomy |
| Growlanser: Heritage of War | PlayStation 2 | August 3, 2006 | Career Soft |
| Stella Deus: The Spirit of Darkness | NTT DoCoMo | September 19, 2006 | Atlus |
| Stella Deus: The Spirit of Darkness | Nintendo Switch | September 4, 2025 | G-Mode |
| Stella Deus: The Spirit of Darkness | Windows | September 18, 2025 | G-Mode |
| Kuryū Yōma Gakuenki Recharge | PlayStation 2 | September 28, 2006 | Killaware |
| Trauma Center: Second Opinion | Wii | November 19, 2006 | Atlus |
| Megami Ibunroku Persona: Ikū no Tō-hen | Mobile phones | December 1, 2006 | Atlus |
| Megami Ibunroku Persona: Ikū no Tō-hen | Nintendo Switch | September 14, 2023 | G-Mode |
| Megami Ibunroku Persona: Ikū no Tō-hen | Windows | September 29, 2023 | G-Mode |
| Digital Devil Saga: Avatar Tuner ‒ A's Test Server | Mobile phones | December 7, 2006 | Interactive Brains |
| Digital Devil Saga: Avatar Tuner ‒ A's Test Server | NTT DoCoMo | February 26, 2007 | Interactive Brains |
| Digital Devil Saga: Avatar Tuner ‒ A's Test Server | Nintendo Switch | April 16, 2026 | G-Mode |
| Digital Devil Saga: Avatar Tuner ‒ A's Test Server | Windows | April 16, 2026 | G-Mode |
| Growlanser Alternative | Mobile phones | January 17, 2007 | Atlus |
| Etrian Odyssey | Nintendo DS | January 18, 2007 | Lancarse; Atlus |
| Stella Deus: Time of Alchemy | NTT DoCoMo | January 22, 2007 | Atlus |
| Stella Deus: Time of Alchemy | Nintendo Switch | November 20, 2025 | G-Mode |
| Stella Deus: Time of Alchemy | Windows | November 20, 2025 | G-Mode |
| Shin Megami Tensei: Tokyo Requiem | Mobile phones | April 2, 2007 | Atlus |
| Shin Megami Tensei: Tokyo Requiem | Nintendo Switch | August 29, 2025 | G-Mode |
| Shin Megami Tensei: Tokyo Requiem | Windows | August 29, 2025 | G-Mode |
| Shin Megami Tensei: Imagine | Windows | April 7, 2007 | Cave |
| Persona 3 FES | PlayStation 2 | April 19, 2007 | Atlus |
| Megami Tensei QIX: Persona 3 | Mobile phones | April 27, 2007 | Atlus |
| Megami Tensei Chaining Soul: Persona 3 | Mobile phones | May 14, 2007 | Atlus |
| Odin Sphere | PlayStation 2 | May 17, 2007 | Vanillaware |
| Shin Megami Tensei: Devil Colosseum 20XX | Mobile phones | May 28, 2007 | Atlus |
| Growlanser VI: Precarious World | PlayStation 2 | June 21, 2007 | Career Soft |
| Majin Tensei Blind Thinker | NTT DoCoMo | July 11, 2007 | Atlus |
| Majin Tensei Blind Thinker | Nintendo Switch | November 16, 2023 | G-Mode |
| Majin Tensei Blind Thinker | Windows | November 16, 2023 | G-Mode |
| Devil Summoner: Soul Hackers Intruders | Mobile phones | August 30, 2007 | Atlus |
| Megami Tensei Gaiden: Last Bible New Testament | Mobile phones | September 10, 2007 | Atlus |
| Megami Tensei Gaiden: Last Bible New Testament | Nintendo Switch | July 14, 2022 | G-Mode |
| Megami Tensei Gaiden: Last Bible New Testament | Windows | December 13, 2022 | G-Mode |
| Persona 2: Tsumi ‒ Lost Memories | Mobile phones | October 1, 2007 | Atlus |
| Aegis: The First Mission | Mobile phones | October 29, 2007 | Atlus |
| Aegis: The First Mission | Nintendo Switch | September 14, 2023 | G-Mode |
| Aegis: The First Mission | Windows | September 14, 2023 | G-Mode |
| Trauma Center: New Blood | Wii | November 20, 2007 | Atlus |
| Persona 3em | Mobile phones | November 26, 2007 | Atlus |
| PokoPoko Tonkacchin | Arcade | 2008 | Atlus |
| Pandora Saga | Windows | 2008 | Rosso Index |
| Etrian Odyssey II: Heroes of Lagaard | Nintendo DS | February 21, 2008 | Atlus |
| Trauma Center: Under the Knife 2 | Nintendo DS | July 2, 2008 | Atlus |
| Persona 4 | PlayStation 2 | July 10, 2008 | Atlus |
| Megami Tensei Gaiden: Last Bible New Testament II | Mobile phones | August 18, 2008 | Atlus |
| Megami Tensei Gaiden: Last Bible New Testament II | Nintendo Switch | September 29, 2022 | G-Mode |
| Megami Tensei Gaiden: Last Bible New Testament II | Windows | December 13, 2022 | G-Mode |
| Shin Megami Tensei III: Nocturne Maniax Chronicle Edition | PlayStation 2 | October 23, 2008 | Atlus |
| Devil Summoner 2: Raidou Kuzunoha vs. King Abaddon | PlayStation 2 | October 23, 2008 | Atlus |
| Shin Megami Tensei: Devil Survivor | Nintendo DS | January 15, 2009 | Atlus |
| Persona Mobile Online | Mobile phones | March 16, 2009 | Atlus |
| Shin Megami Tensei: Persona | PlayStation Portable | April 29, 2009 | Atlus |
| Growlanser | PlayStation Portable | May 14, 2009 | Career Soft |
| Gokujō!! Mecha Mote Iinchō Kurumote Gāruzu Kontesuto! | Arcade | July 15, 2009 | Atlus |
| Gōketsuji Ichizoku Matsuri Senzo Kuyou | Arcade | July 24, 2009 | Atlus |
| Shin Megami Tensei: Strange Journey | Nintendo DS | October 8, 2009 | Atlus |
| Persona 3 Portable | PlayStation Portable | November 1, 2009 | Atlus |
| Persona 3 Portable | Nintendo Switch | January 19, 2023 | Atlus |
| Persona 3 Portable | PlayStation 4 | January 19, 2023 | Atlus |
| Persona 3 Portable | Windows | January 19, 2023 | Atlus |
| Persona 3 Portable | Xbox One | January 19, 2023 | Atlus |
| Persona 3 Portable | Xbox Series X/S | January 19, 2023 | Atlus |
| Sparkle Snapshots | Nintendo DSi | April 22, 2009 | Atlus |
| Etrian Odyssey III: The Drowned City | Nintendo DS | April 1, 2010 | Atlus |
| Tokyo Mono Hara Shi: Karasu no Mori Gakuen Kitan | PlayStation Portable | April 22, 2010 | Atlus |
| Trauma Team | Wii | May 18, 2010 | Atlus |
| Megami Tensei Gaiden: Last Bible New Testament III | Mobile phones | September 17, 2010 | Atlus |
| Megami Tensei Gaiden: Last Bible New Testament III | Nintendo Switch | November 24, 2022 | G-Mode |
| Megami Tensei Gaiden: Last Bible New Testament III | Windows | December 13, 2022 | G-Mode |
| Inazuma Eleven Bakunetsu Soccer Battle | Arcade | September 30, 2010 | Atlus |
| Radiant Historia | Nintendo DS | November 3, 2010 | Atlus |
| Shin Megami Tensei: Devil Hunter Zero | GREE | January 21, 2011 | Atlus |
| Catherine | PlayStation 3 | February 17, 2011 | Atlus |
| Catherine | Xbox 360 | February 17, 2011 | Atlus |
| Catherine | Windows | January 10, 2019 | Atlus |
| Persona 2: Innocent Sin | PlayStation Portable | April 14, 2011 | Atlus |
| Shin Megami Tensei: Devil Children | GREE | July 13, 2011 | Atlus |
| Growlanser: Wayfarer of Time | PlayStation Portable | July 18, 2011 | Career Soft |
| Nora to Toki no Kōbō: Kiri no Mori no Majo | Nintendo DS | July 21, 2011 | Atlus |
| Shin Megami Tensei: Devil Survivor 2 | Nintendo DS | July 28, 2011 | Atlus |
| Shin Megami Tensei: Devil Survivor Overclocked | Nintendo 3DS | August 23, 2011 | Atlus |
| Inazuma Eleven GO Battle Stadium | Arcade | December 21, 2011 | Atlus |
| Sparkle Snapshots 3D | Nintendo 3DS | December 27, 2011 | Atlus |
| Knights of the Sky | Web browser | January 13, 2012 | Joyport |
| Persona 4 Arena | Arcade | March 1, 2012 | Arc System Works; Atlus |
| Persona 4 Arena | PlayStation 3 | July 26, 2012 | Arc System Works; Atlus |
| Persona 4 Arena | Xbox 360 | July 26, 2012 | Arc System Works; Atlus |
| Persona 2: Eternal Punishment | PlayStation Portable | May 12, 2012 | Atlus |
| Persona 4 Golden | PlayStation Vita | June 14, 2012 | P-Studio |
| Persona 4 Golden | Windows | June 13, 2020 | P-Studio |
| Persona 4 Golden | Nintendo Switch | January 19, 2023 | P-Studio |
| Persona 4 Golden | PlayStation 4 | January 19, 2023 | P-Studio |
| Persona 4 Golden | Xbox One | January 19, 2023 | P-Studio |
| Persona 4 Golden | Xbox Series X/S | January 19, 2023 | P-Studio |
| Etrian Odyssey IV | Nintendo 3DS | July 5, 2012 | Atlus |
| Devil Summoner: Soul Hackers | Nintendo 3DS | August 30, 2012 | Atlus |
| Shin Megami Tensei IV | Nintendo 3DS | May 23, 2013 | Atlus |
| Etrian Odyssey Untold: The Millennium Girl | Nintendo 3DS | June 27, 2013 | Atlus |
| Dragon's Crown | PlayStation 3 | July 25, 2013 | Vanillaware |
| Dragon's Crown | PlayStation Vita | July 25, 2013 | Vanillaware |
| Persona Q: Shadow of the Labyrinth | Nintendo 3DS | June 5, 2014 | Atlus |
| Persona 4 Arena Ultimax | Arcade | November 28, 2013 | Arc System Works; P-Studio |
| Persona 4 Arena Ultimax | PlayStation 3 | August 28, 2014 | Arc System Works; P-Studio |
| Persona 4 Arena Ultimax | Xbox 360 | September 30, 2014 | Arc System Works; P-Studio |
| Persona 4 Arena Ultimax | Nintendo Switch | March 17, 2022 | Arc System Works; P-Studio |
| Persona 4 Arena Ultimax | PlayStation 4 | March 17, 2022 | Arc System Works; P-Studio |
| Persona 4 Arena Ultimax | Windows | March 17, 2022 | Arc System Works; P-Studio |
| Etrian Odyssey 2 Untold: The Fafnir Knight | Nintendo 3DS | November 27, 2014 | Atlus |
| Devil Survivor 2: Record Breaker | Nintendo 3DS | January 29, 2015 | Atlus |
| Etrian Mystery Dungeon | Nintendo 3DS | March 5, 2015 | Spike Chunsoft |
| Persona 4: Dancing All Night | PlayStation Vita | June 25, 2015 | P-Studio |
| Persona 4: Dancing All Night | PlayStation 4 | May 24, 2018 | P-Studio |
| Tokyo Mirage Sessions ♯FE | Wii U | December 26, 2015 | Atlus |
| Odin Sphere Leifthrasir | PlayStation 3 | January 14, 2016 | Vanillaware |
| Odin Sphere Leifthrasir | PlayStation 4 | January 14, 2016 | Vanillaware |
| Odin Sphere Leifthrasir | PlayStation Vita | January 14, 2016 | Vanillaware |
| Shin Megami Tensei IV: Apocalypse | Nintendo 3DS | February 10, 2016 | Atlus |
| Etrian Odyssey V | Nintendo 3DS | August 4, 2016 | Atlus |
| Persona 5 | PlayStation 3 | September 15, 2016 | P-Studio |
| Persona 5 | PlayStation 4 | September 15, 2016 | P-Studio |
| Radiant Historia: Perfect Chronology | Nintendo 3DS | June 29, 2017 | Atlus |
| Etrian Mystery Dungeon 2 | Nintendo 3DS | August 31, 2017 | Atlus |
| Shin Megami Tensei: Strange Journey Redux | Nintendo 3DS | October 26, 2017 | Atlus |
| Dragon's Crown Pro | PlayStation 4 | February 8, 2018 | Vanillaware |
| Persona 3: Dancing in Moonlight | PlayStation 4 | May 24, 2018 | P-Studio |
| Persona 3: Dancing in Moonlight | PlayStation Vita | May 24, 2018 | P-Studio |
| Persona 5: Dancing in Starlight | PlayStation 4 | May 24, 2018 | P-Studio |
| Persona 5: Dancing in Starlight | PlayStation Vita | May 24, 2018 | P-Studio |
| Etrian Odyssey Nexus | Nintendo 3DS | August 2, 2018 | Atlus |
| Persona Q2: New Cinema Labyrinth | Nintendo 3DS | November 29, 2018 | P-Studio |
| Catherine: Full Body | PlayStation 4 | February 14, 2019 | Studio Zero |
| Catherine: Full Body | PlayStation Vita | February 14, 2019 | Studio Zero |
| Catherine: Full Body | Nintendo Switch | July 2, 2020 | Studio Zero |
| Persona 5 Royal | PlayStation 4 | October 31, 2019 | P-Studio |
| Persona 5 Royal | Nintendo Switch | October 21, 2022 | P-Studio |
| Persona 5 Royal | PlayStation 5 | October 21, 2022 | P-Studio |
| Persona 5 Royal | Windows | October 21, 2022 | P-Studio |
| Persona 5 Royal | Xbox One | October 21, 2022 | P-Studio |
| Persona 5 Royal | Xbox Series X/S | October 21, 2022 | P-Studio |
| 13 Sentinels: Aegis Rim | PlayStation 4 | November 28, 2019 | Vanillaware |
| 13 Sentinels: Aegis Rim | Nintendo Switch | April 12, 2022 | Vanillaware |
| Tokyo Mirage Sessions ♯FE Encore | Nintendo Switch | January 17, 2020 | Atlus |
| Persona 5 Strikers | Nintendo Switch | February 20, 2020 | Omega Force; P-Studio |
| Persona 5 Strikers | PlayStation 4 | February 20, 2020 | Omega Force; P-Studio |
| Persona 5 Strikers | Windows | February 23, 2021 | Omega Force; P-Studio |
| Shin Megami Tensei III: Nocturne HD Remaster | Nintendo Switch | October 29, 2020 | Atlus |
| Shin Megami Tensei III: Nocturne HD Remaster | PlayStation 4 | October 29, 2020 | Atlus |
| Shin Megami Tensei III: Nocturne HD Remaster | Windows | May 25, 2021 | Atlus |
| Shin Megami Tensei V | Nintendo Switch | November 11, 2021 | Atlus |
| Soul Hackers 2 | PlayStation 4 | August 25, 2022 | Atlus |
| Soul Hackers 2 | PlayStation 5 | August 25, 2022 | Atlus |
| Soul Hackers 2 | Windows | August 25, 2022 | Atlus |
| Soul Hackers 2 | Xbox One | August 25, 2022 | Atlus |
| Soul Hackers 2 | Xbox Series X/S | August 25, 2022 | Atlus |
| Etrian Odyssey Origins Collection | Nintendo Switch | June 1, 2023 | Atlus |
| Etrian Odyssey Origins Collection | Windows | June 1, 2023 | Atlus |
| Persona 5 Tactica | Nintendo Switch | November 17, 2023 | P-Studio |
| Persona 5 Tactica | PlayStation 4 | November 17, 2023 | P-Studio |
| Persona 5 Tactica | PlayStation 5 | November 17, 2023 | P-Studio |
| Persona 5 Tactica | Windows | November 17, 2023 | P-Studio |
| Persona 5 Tactica | Xbox One | November 17, 2023 | P-Studio |
| Persona 5 Tactica | Xbox Series X/S | November 17, 2023 | P-Studio |
| Persona 3 Reload | PlayStation 4 | February 2, 2024 | P-Studio |
| Persona 3 Reload | PlayStation 5 | February 2, 2024 | P-Studio |
| Persona 3 Reload | Windows | February 2, 2024 | P-Studio |
| Persona 3 Reload | Xbox One | February 2, 2024 | P-Studio |
| Persona 3 Reload | Xbox Series X/S | February 2, 2024 | P-Studio |
| Persona 3 Reload | Nintendo Switch 2 | October 23, 2025 | P-Studio |
| Unicorn Overlord | Nintendo Switch | March 8, 2024 | Vanillaware |
| Unicorn Overlord | PlayStation 4 | March 8, 2024 | Vanillaware |
| Unicorn Overlord | PlayStation 5 | March 8, 2024 | Vanillaware |
| Unicorn Overlord | Xbox Series X/S | March 8, 2024 | Vanillaware |
| Shin Megami Tensei V: Vengeance | Nintendo Switch | June 14, 2024 | Atlus |
| Shin Megami Tensei V: Vengeance | PlayStation 4 | June 14, 2024 | Atlus |
| Shin Megami Tensei V: Vengeance | PlayStation 5 | June 14, 2024 | Atlus |
| Shin Megami Tensei V: Vengeance | Windows | June 14, 2024 | Atlus |
| Shin Megami Tensei V: Vengeance | Xbox One | June 14, 2024 | Atlus |
| Shin Megami Tensei V: Vengeance | Xbox Series X/S | June 14, 2024 | Atlus |
| Metaphor: ReFantazio | PlayStation 4 | October 11, 2024 | Studio Zero |
| Metaphor: ReFantazio | PlayStation 5 | October 11, 2024 | Studio Zero |
| Metaphor: ReFantazio | Windows | October 11, 2024 | Studio Zero |
| Metaphor: ReFantazio | Xbox Series X/S | October 11, 2024 | Studio Zero |
| Metaphor: ReFantazio | Nintendo Switch 2 | November 12, 2026 | Studio Zero |
| Raidou Remastered: The Mystery of the Soulless Army | Nintendo Switch | June 19, 2025 | Atlus |
| Raidou Remastered: The Mystery of the Soulless Army | Nintendo Switch 2 | June 19, 2025 | Atlus |
| Raidou Remastered: The Mystery of the Soulless Army | PlayStation 4 | June 19, 2025 | Atlus |
| Raidou Remastered: The Mystery of the Soulless Army | PlayStation 5 | June 19, 2025 | Atlus |
| Raidou Remastered: The Mystery of the Soulless Army | Windows | June 19, 2025 | Atlus |
| Raidou Remastered: The Mystery of the Soulless Army | Xbox Series X/S | June 19, 2025 | Atlus |
| Persona 5: The Phantom X | Android | June 26, 2025 | Black Wings Game Studio |
| Persona 5: The Phantom X | iOS | June 26, 2025 | Black Wings Game Studio |
| Persona 5: The Phantom X | Windows | June 26, 2025 | Black Wings Game Studio |
| Persona 4 Revival | PlayStation 5 | February 18, 2027 | P-Studio |
| Persona 4 Revival | Windows | February 18, 2027 | P-Studio |
| Persona 4 Revival | Xbox Series X/S | February 18, 2027 | P-Studio |
| Persona 4 Revival | Nintendo Switch 2 | May 20, 2027 | P-Studio |
| Persona 6 | PlayStation 5 | TBA | P-Studio |
| Persona 6 | Windows | TBA | P-Studio |
| Persona 6 | Xbox Series X/S | TBA | P-Studio |
| Persona 6 | Nintendo Switch 2 | TBA | P-Studio |
