= Shin Megami Tensei: 20XX =

2004 role-playing video game

- Title screen
- Developer: Atlus
- Publishers: Atlus (mobile); G-Mode (Switch, Windows)
- Series: Megami Tensei
- Platforms: Mobile phones; Nintendo Switch; Windows
- Release: Mobile: JP: August 26, 2004; Nintendo Switch: JP: April 24, 2025; Windows: JP: May 14, 2025
- Genre: Role-playing
- Mode: Single-player

Shin Megami Tensei: 20XX (Note: Japanese: 真・女神転生-20XX, Hepburn: Shin Megami Tensei Nisen Ekkusu; "True Goddess Reincarnation: 20XX") is a 2004 role-playing video game developed and published by Atlus. It is part of their Megami Tensei series, and is a prequel to the 1994 game Shin Megami Tensei II, taking place decades earlier. It was released for Japanese feature phones starting in 2004, and was re-released by G-Mode for Nintendo Switch and Windows in 2025. It was followed by the spin-off Shin Megami Tensei: Devil Colosseum 20XX (Note: 真・女神転生 デビルコロシアム20XX, Shin Megami Tensei Debiru Koroshiamu Nisen Ekkusu) in 2007.

The game follows a boy in the Valhalla district of Tokyo Millennium, who is helped by a man to gain strength in exchange for helping him take down the woman in charge of the district. The player takes the role of the boy and a girl accompanying him, and navigates dungeons in a first-person perspective while fighting and negotiating with demons. The game was well received for its branching story and the complexity of its demon fusion mechanics, and was a success, with 100,000 downloads as of 2007.

== Gameplay ==
The player navigates 3D dungeons from a first-person perspective, and fights demons.

Shin Megami Tensei: 20XX is a role-playing video game in which the player, taking the role of a boy accompanied by a girl, navigates 3D dungeons in a first-person perspective. While exploring, they encounter and fight demons, earning them money and experience points, which increases the characters' levels and makes them stronger. If an ally falls in battle, they can no longer fight until they are either revived by magic or taken to a facility that offers healing.

In addition to battling, the player can choose to negotiate with demons of the same level or lower than the boy, to try to recruit them to their party; this might involve choosing the right dialogue options, or giving the demons money or items that they want. Once the player has recruited demons, they can visit the Cathedral of Shadows to fuse multiple allied demons into single stronger ones. The player can also fuse demons with swords, or multiple swords together, to create new equipment for their characters to use in battle.

Throughout the game, the player makes choices that affect the boy's alignment – law, neutral, or chaos – and the direction of the plot, eventually resulting in one of several endings; reaching one ending takes an estimated twenty hours. The alignment also affects which demon allies are available to the player, and which facilities they can visit.

== Premise ==
Shin Megami Tensei: 20XX is a prequel to Shin Megami Tensei II, set decades prior in the Valhalla residential area of Tokyo Millennium, a futuristic city rife with violence, which was built atop the ruins of Tokyo after a nuclear attack. The city is controlled by the Center, which is led by holy priests, and stands in high contrast to the poverty of Valhalla.

The story follows a teenage boy who wants to become strong, and who is introduced by his friend Moss to a man who tells him about the conflict between the Messians and the Ring of Gaea. The man offers to help him attain strength in exchange for helping him take down Madam, the woman in charge of Valhalla. The boy accepts, and begins training in a gym to become the Colosseum champion. (Note: See Game Watch, NLab, Famitsu, and Sina.) After his trainer asks him to experience a real battle in the underground arcade, he meets and teams up with an amnesiac girl who is a strong and capable fighter.

== Development and release ==
Shin Megami Tensei: 20XX was developed and published by Atlus, with gameplay similar to previous Megami Tensei games, and graphics similar to those of the Game Boy Advance versions of Shin Megami Tensei and Shin Megami Tensei II. The game was announced in July 2004, with the release of a trailer and a Flash-based version of the game's prologue, and was released for Japanese feature phones starting on August 26, 2004, as the second original Megami Tensei mobile role-playing game after Shin Megami Tensei If... Hazama-hen. It was released through the mobile game distribution service Megaten Alpha, where players could access it through a monthly subscription.

In 2025, G-Mode announced a re-release of the game as part of their G-Mode Archives+ line as one of its fifth anniversary titles, along with Shin Megami Tensei: Tokyo Requiem, Armored Core: Mobile Mission, and Armored Core: Mobile 2. Like other games in the line, the re-release is intended to retain the game as it originally was, with no changes to its gameplay. It launched on April 24, 2025, for Nintendo Switch, and on May 14 for Windows, following a delay from May 8.

Shin Megami Tensei: Devil Colosseum 20XX, a spin-off game by Bbmf, was released for Japanese feature phones on May 28, 2007, and was designed with a focus on strategic combat. It is set around the same time as 20XX, and follows a 14-year-old girl who guides demons in battle in the Devil Colosseum to rise through the ranks while trying to find out what happened to her missing twin brother. Like with 20XX, the player can fuse demons in the Cathedral of Shadows, and their choices affect the player character's alignment and how the story ends.

== Reception ==
Shin Megami Tensei: 20XX was a success, and had been downloaded over 100,000 times as of October 2007; Inside Games reported that players liked its challenge, branching story, and its gameplay in the tradition of early Shin Megami Tensei games. Critics were also positive: Famitsu liked its fusion system for its complexity, with the ability to fuse swords in addition to demons, and called it a "must-play" game for Shin Megami Tensei fans. NLab recommended it for its branching story with different endings, and Dengeki Online appreciated it for its original scenario, recommending it both to Megami Tensei fans broadly, and to those who had played the previous mobile game in the series, Shin Megami Tensei If... Hazama-hen. The Korean newspaper Electronic Times found it graphically impressive, and considered it superior to Game Boy Advance games and to Korean mobile games at the time.
