= Knights of the Sky (2009 video game) =

2009 Flash MMORTS game

- Logo for Knights of the Sky (post-April 2012)
- Developer: Joyport
- Publishers: CN/TW: Ledu; WW: Atlus (2012–2013) Marvelous USA (2013)
- Platforms: Web browser, Microsoft Windows, OS X
- Release: CN: October 19, 2009; TW: April 13, 2010; WW: January 13, 2012
- Genre: Massively multiplayer online real-time strategy game
- Mode: Multiplayer

Knights of the Sky, formerly known when it was released in China as Chinese: 魔晶幻想; lit. 'Magic Crystal Fantasy', was a massively multiplayer online real-time strategy game (MMORTS) developed by Hangzhou Legang, a subsidiary of Joyport, for browsers using Adobe Flash. Originally released in China in 2009, it was later released in Taiwan in 2010, then would be licensed by Atlus for a worldwide release in 2012.

== Gameplay ==
Combat in Knights of the Sky, displaying the grid interface and units.

Knights of the Sky is a free to play massively multiplayer online real-time strategy game set in the world of Odyssya, where at the start of the game the player (who is referred to as a Lord) can choose to join one of two factions: the Empire, or the Federation. Shortly after the tutorial, players are entrusted with a "Sky Castle", a floating city that is used as a base, a way to accept quests from non-player characters (NPCs), and as a way to move around the map for battles or resource gathering. The game's story is delivered through quests with NPCs with both main and optional side quests that grant experience points, gear, and portions of the six main in-game currencies upon completion. While most of the units and items can be bought using in-game currency, cosmetic or time-saving items can be bought for real money.

Combat in Knights of the Sky is done through fast turn-based combat where units (referred to as Heroes) are commanded on a tile-based grid with each Hero having separate stats determining how far they can move, how much damage they can deal or take, and their general strengths. Winning battles grants the Heroes experience points as well as currency rewards. The faction chosen at the start of the game dictates which faction of enemies you will be fighting, which are either neutral enemies or members of the opposing faction.

Although much of the game can be done single-player, players can interact with others through a chat system and work together in groups called Guilds to help pool resources and take on harder challenges.

== Plot ==
Knights of the Sky is set in the fantasy world of Odyssya. Before the events of Knights of the Sky, the world of Odyssya was a single kingdom ruled by a monarch and a set of nobles who used magic to oppress the people. One day a man would create alchemy, and with it the people gained the power to challenge the monarch and the nobility. This fight would cause the oppressed people to unite to form the Federation, while the remaining nobility would form the Empire to oppose it.

== Development and release ==
Former logo for Magic Crystal Fantasy (2010 - March 2012)

Knights of the Sky was originally announced in July 2009 under the name (Chinese: 魔晶幻想; lit. 'Magic Crystal Fantasy') with its first public appearance being at the annual ChinaJoy that year. A few months later, a closed beta test would be announced for the middle of October that year, which would begin on October 19. Shortly following this, they would release a second closed beta test on October 28, with a final open beta test releasing a month later on December 8, 2009. The game would experience a domain change on January 26, 2010 to its current publisher's website before a couple months later announcing a Taiwan release for April 13 of that year. Over this period of the game's life it would receive regular updates, including major updates that would expand the alliance system and introduce new features.

Globally, Knights of the Sky was originally announced in December 2011 on the Atlus Online Forums, with its announcement of a closed beta launch on January 13, 2012. This closed beta would last for three days, ending on January 16. Following this, starting February 9, 2012, the game entered open beta. This open beta period would last an unknown amount of time before the game transitioned into full release. Around April 2012, the game would transition their art style for their NPCs from a realistic anime art style to a more stylized art style, similar to a chibi art style.

A division of Atlus USA called Atlus Online managed the game from January 2012 until May 2013, when management of the game was transferred to Marvelous USA when they acquired Atlus Online from its parent company, alongside other MMO games they owned like Shin Megami Tensei: Imagine. Sometime between August 15, 2013 and September 16, 2013, the global servers of Knights of the Sky would shut down, and the game would be delisted from Marvelous' game library. Players who visited the game's site on or after October 12 would be redirected to Marvelous USA’s main page with the code “KOTSCLOSEO” in the link, signifying the closure of the global servers of the game, having been shut down less than two years after beginning service. The Chinese and Taiwanese servers would be shut down in similar fashion sometime in between February 18, 2012 and March 16, 2012 when the game would be delisted from Ledu's game library, redirecting users who visited the game's site after March 20 to Ledu's game library.

== Reception ==
Reception

Review scores
Publication	Score
Gamezebo	70/100
4399.com	44.5/50

During the game's life as Magic Crystal Fantasy, 4399.com would review it during its open beta, describing the graphics as "beautiful" and praising its stability, but would also criticize its long load times, lack of game balance, and its overly complex story.

Once it had become Knights of the Sky during its open beta, Zevri of BBGSite.com would like the game's enemy AI and the easy to learn gameplay, but would also dislike how "unit numbers tended to outmatch wit", and how "hollow" the city building aspects felt. During its official worldwide release, Nick Tylwalk of Gamezebo would praise the character artwork and the features in context of this being a browser game, calling it "ambitious" and "impressive", with his main criticisms being about the complicated in-game resource management, the steep learning curve, and the time commitment.

== See also ==
- Shin Megami Tensei: Imagine
