= Shin Megami Tensei: Imagine =

2007 online role-playing video game

- Logo for Imagine post-2008
- Developers: Cave; GungHo Online Entertainment
- Publishers: JP: Atlus; WW: Aeria Games (2007–2012) Atlus (2012–2013) Marvelous USA (2013–2014)
- Director: Hajime Tanigawa
- Producers: Hideo Yokoyama; Haruka Shinkawa
- Composers: Kenichi Yoshikawa; Daisuke Matsumoto
- Series: Megami Tensei
- Platform: Windows
- Release: JP: April 4, 2007; NA: December 31, 2008; EU: January 5, 2009
- Genre: MMORPG
- Mode: Multiplayer

Shin Megami Tensei: Imagine, (Note: Shin Megami Tensei: Imagine (真・女神転生IMAGINE; lit. True Goddess Reincarnation: Imagine)) formerly known as Megami Tensei Online: Imagine, was a massively multiplayer online role-playing game (MMORPG) for Windows. It is part of the Megami Tensei series, and was developed by CAVE and later on GungHo Online Entertainment under license from the series creator Atlus. Originally released in Japan in 2007, it was later released in North America in 2008, then in Europe in 2009. Imagine is set between Shin Megami Tensei and its sequel, in the aftermath of a war which devastated humanity and prompted the arrival of hostile demons split into two opposing factions: Law and Chaos. The player character, a Demon Buster, is tasked with interacting with and fighting the demons that infest post-apocalyptic Tokyo. The gameplay uses real-time combat in open environments similar to other MMORPGs, while carrying over the Megami Tensei series' recurring demon recruitment and fusion mechanics.

Imagine originated as an attempt at developing an online version of Shin Megami Tensei: Nine for PC after Nine's online version was cancelled. The game's development lasted for over four years. For the first three and a half years, it was produced by Atlus as an online role-playing game. Development was then transferred to CAVE and continued for a further twenty months: during this period, it became and was marketed as an MMORPG. Upon release, it was critically acclaimed and attracted a large player following in Japan. The Western version was handled by multiple companies until its closure in January 2014. The Japanese version closed down in May 2016, nine years after beginning service.

== Gameplay ==
Combat in Shin Megami Tensei: Imagine, showing the player character, interface, and assigned demon

Shin Megami Tensei: Imagine is a free-to-play massively multiplayer online role-playing game (MMORPG) set in post-apocalyptic Tokyo. Players take control of a "Demon Buster", an avatar whose gender and appearance are selected by the player. Using the tower city Shinjuku Babel as a base, players explore various locations including the surface and underground areas. In Shinjuku Babel, players accept quests from non-player characters (NPCs); switch out their equipment and weapons, and buy new items from shops run by NPCs. While most of the items can be bought using in-game currency, higher-status items can be bought for real money. Players can explore on their own, or team up in groups to take on more difficult parts of the game. The game is delivered in "chapters" that advance the story, along with various optional sidequests that grant experience points and in-game currency upon completion. Combat in Imagine plays out in real-time in the game's environments, with attack options varying from short-range melee to long-range physical and magical attacks. As with other MMORPGs such as World of Warcraft, various abilities are mapped to face buttons and each ability has a cooldown timer. Real-time commands given by the player enables their avatar to block, dodge and counterattack. Different enemies are resistant or weak to different weapons and abilities.

As with previous Megami Tensei games, demons are central to combat. They are acquired by the player through real-time negotiation: upon contacting a demon, they must successfully negotiate a conversation with them which can entail either friendly persuasion or intimidation of a demon. Once a demon is allied with the player, they aid them in combat: only one demon can be summoned at any one time, and when summoned that demon follows the player around as they navigate environments. Each time a demon is summoned, it costs a certain amount of magnetite, an in-game currency. Several demons can be held by them on the go, while further demons can be stored in Shinjuku Babel. Demons and the player gain experience levels separately: when the avatar has gained a level, they can assign stat points to various attributes. These in turn effect their abilities in battle and further skill development. Two different demons can be fused into a new demon in a location known as the Cathedral of Shadows: upon fusion, the new demon can inherit different skills from its demon parents. The skills a demon possesses can be altered or enhanced depending on their use in battles.

== Synopsis ==
Imagine is set in post-apocalyptic Tokyo. In the events leading up to Imagine, which were depicted in Shin Megami Tensei. Humanity began experimenting with new technologies during the 1990s: among the discoveries made was that all life and reality was made up of data. When demons began appearing across the world, chaos ensued with the rising of opposing factions supported by human sympathizers: servants of God who sought to bring order, and servants of Lucifer who spread chaos. The conflict culminated into the international launching of ICBMs, which devastated the world and left humanity at the mercy of demons. During the events of Shin Megami Tensei, a group of young people defied both God and Lucifer in creating a world where humans could flourish again.

Taking place in a time period referred to as "202X", Imagine takes place in the gap between Shin Megami Tensei and its direct sequel, following on from the first game's neutral ending: despite these connections, Imagine is a self-contained narrative with its own characters. Humanity lives in a new metropolis called Shinjuku Babel, founded by the Seven Philosophers as a new home for Tokyo's survivors. At the opening of Imagine, three mysterious towers appear that warp the land around them and trigger a resurgence of demons which start attacking the human population. The player character, a young Demon Buster, investigates a series of attacks on underground shelter. They are soon drawn into a conflict between the Order of Messiah (followers of God), and the Ring of Gaea (followers of Lucifer), and must explore and discover the true origins of the towers. The story is influenced by player decisions, which can shift between Law, Chaos, and Neutral routes.

== Development ==
Shin Megami Tensei: Imagine originated in 2003 as a Windows port of the online version of Shin Megami Tensei: Nine. Nine was initially planned as an online multiplayer game for the Xbox, but during its development the online elements were removed due to rising costs, with an offline single-player version released in 2002. Eventually, due to development problems and the profitability of online games, the online Xbox version was cancelled in 2003. However, developer Atlus confirmed that they were creating an online version of Nine for PC due to the more lucrative market. During its early development, the PC version of Nine was renamed Shin Megami Tensei: Imagine, continuing development as a different entity for approximately three and a half years. The original music for the title was composed by series newcomer Kenichi Yoshikawa: tracks for earlier games by Shoji Meguro and Tsukasa Masuko were used in an arranged form. After 2012, music composition was taken over by Daisuke Matsumoto.

When first revealed, the game was primarily developed by Atlus, with the online infrastructure being developed by the Japanese company ISAO. It was classified as an "online role-playing game" which got round the server-based problems of MMORPGs by using a single server for all players. By 2005, Atlus had licensed its development to CAVE; for the game's development, a new subsidiary called CAVE Online was created, made up of former Atlus staff members. This subsidiary merged back into CAVE by September 2006 during the final year of work on the game. The total length of time in which CAVE worked on the title has been estimated as about 20 months. The game used a version of the Virtual Community Engine (VCE), a middleware engine that enabled the centralization of servers and networking, aiming for a smooth and fast running experience for players. An important part of the development process for its designers was accurately translating Kazuma Kaneko's demon designs into 3D.

According to director Hajime Tanigawa, its gameplay was based around prevalent South Korean online role-playing games for PC. Tanigawa joined when the title shifted to being an MMORPG, and he estimated development time in this form at ten months. At the beginning of development, the team decided to release a working form of the game within a year. This was managed by narrowing the amount of time spent on the early concept work, instead taking inspiration directly from other titles, including titles within the Megami Tensei series: Tanigawa said that without this, development might have lasted up to three years. When the closed beta began, many of the game's final functions had yet to be implemented. A free-to-play model was adopted as the team wanted to bring in the maximum number of players into the game. While making the game completely free and using in-game advertising as a means of earning money was an option, this had yet to become commercially viable in Japan at the time. In early 2007, CAVE partnered with Gung Ho Online Entertainment, a Japanese company experienced with online games who could co-manage the game with CAVE. According to Tanigawa, the partnership with Gung Ho Online opened up the possibility of expansion into Asian and Western markets.

== Release ==
Imagine was first announced in July 2004 under the title Shin Megami Tensei Online: Imagine, with its first public appearance coming at the 2003 Tokyo Character Show. After a limited beta test at a commercial event, news on the game ended until July 2005, when it was re-revealed as an MMORPG at that year's Tokyo Game Show. After another prolonged silence, a closed beta test was announced in June 2006 for the end of that year, along with the game's rebranding as Megami Tensei Online: Imagine. The closed beta lasted across November and December 2006. In February 2007, the game entered open beta. A physical Premium Package, featuring special items and in-game bonus codes, released on March 30. Official service started on April 4 of that year. In December 2007, a second physical release dubbed the "Memorial Package" was released. Multiple features, such as demon mounts for players and zones like an arena and casino, were being developed for later updates when the game released. The time between updates was estimated at between two and three months. The game remained under the Megami Tensei Online: Imagine title until its first anniversary: the game underwent a revision, changing its name to Shin Megami Tensei: Imagine and giving it a new logo. Both the new title and logo would remain throughout its life. Over its nine-year lifetime, the game received frequent large and small-scale updates, and underwent staff changes: many of these changes went to adding new demons and expanding demon fusion options, along with creating new zones and storylines.

After initial rumors, a release in North America and Europe was confirmed in September 2008 by Aeria Games, its Western publishers. According to Aeria Games localization expert Michael Stevens, Aeria Games decided to pick up the Western publishing rights for Imagine after being favorably impressed by the gameplay, along with requests from series fans for a Western release of the game. For the game's localization, CAVE hired professional translators to convert the game's Japanese text into English, then both Aeria Games and Atlus USA checked the results over for mistakes and made revisions where necessary. Closed beta tests for North America and Europe began in November 2008. The game went into open beta on December 31, 2008, in North America. In Europe, the open beta began on January 5, 2009. Through a partnership with CodeWeavers, the game was made compatible for then-current Macintosh systems in March 2009.

Aeria Games managed the game until March to April 2012, when a division of Atlus USA called Atlus Online assumed control of the game's Western servers. Atlus USA referred to this move as a "homecoming" for the game due to the brand's deep association with Atlus. Roughly a year later, in May 2013, management of the game transferred to Marvelous USA when they acquired Atlus Online from its parent company. Due to the closure of Marvelous USA's PC department, official Western service of Imagine ended on January 29, 2014, along with multiple other online PC titles supported by the company. The Japanese release continued operation for a further two years. Ultimately, citing the continued difficulties in giving players a quality experience, it was announced that the game would close down on May 24, 2016, nine years after it began service.

The MMO was revived by fans again in November 2023 under a private server called Project New Moon.

== Reception ==
When the Japanese closed beta was open for application, over 80,000 applied. After its open beta began, the game had 100,000 players within just under a month. Two years later, the game had a strong community, and was ranked among Japan's leading online games.

Masashi Ōji, writing for 4Gamer.net after the official release of Imagine, praised multiple aspects of the game, including its story, combat, demon mechanics, flexible character growth system and general sense of belonging within the Megami Tensei series. One recurring point raised by Ōji was that many features promised had yet to be added at that time, which faulted the experience slightly. Rob Fahey of Eurogamer greatly enjoyed the experience, echoing many of the praises given by other journalists, while finding the graphics a little dated, and said that some technical improvements would be positively met. Nick Tylwalk of Gamezebo praised the combat for being much more engaging than other free-to-play games of its type, enjoyed the character customization, and variety of demons, and "excellent" story. His main complaints were a steep learning curve, points where the narrative got lost, and dated-looking graphics and interface. He finished his review by giving the game a score of 3.5 out of 5 stars.

As part of a news article concerning the game, Earnest Cavalli of Wired commented that the game boasted interesting content despite his experiences being from the closed beta version: his opinion was that Megami Tensei fans would enjoy the game, while those more used to World of Warcraft might see it as "a hyper-Japanese Phantasy Star Online clone". GamesRadar's Tyler Nagata listed the game as among the free MMORPGs for PC that were graphically superior to the subscription-based World of Warcraft. Nagata also recommended the game for its friendly community when compared to World of Warcraft: he said that "the usual MMO elitism amongst players doesn't seem as common in MegaTen. From our experience, it was always easy to find friendly (and helpful) players for groups at hubs". In an article concerning some fresh time with the game after a long absence, Baeu Hindman of Joystiq said that he greatly enjoyed his time with Imagine, having become more familiar with the combat but still found some aspects of the game fairly obscure, and greatly appreciating the demon design and the systems that went into them. He recommended that players "take their time" with the game.

== Lawsuit ==
In December 2021, Atlus filed a lawsuit against an individual illegally re-hosting the game online as well as the creators of the server emulator. The targets of the suit are the owner of 'Rekueimu Games' and members of a group called COMP_hack. The court documents were made public in September 2022. Atlus alleges that their copyright was infringed, as Rekuiemu Games hosted a website that was a near exact copy of Atlus' website and COMP_Hack distributed a functional server emulator for Shin Megami Tensei: Imagine. One of the main sources of Atlus' complaints was that the offending website contained false copyright information for 'Rekueimu Games', who do not own Shin Megami Tensei: Imagine or any of its associated media. The court document states that Atlus believes that the 'unauthorized acts as described herein have caused and will continue to cause irreparable damage to Atlus'. Atlus believes that the groups have violated 17 U.S.C. § 50 three times and Digital Millennium Copyright Act, 17 U.S.C. § 1202 once.

Controversy began online when people mistakenly believed another group named ReIMAGINE, who used the same server emulator and provided a similar service as Rekueimu Games, was being targeted by the lawsuit, as their servers coincidentally went down on the same day as the suit became public knowledge. News articles then ran this story without doing their due diligence, and the ReIMAGINE team was forced to put out a statement saying they were not being targeted by Atlus.
