= Racing Damashii =

1991 video game

- Game Boy cover art
- Developer: Irem
- Publisher: Irem
- Platforms: Game Boy; PC Engine
- Release: Game Boy: JP: February 28, 1991; PC Engine: JP: July 19, 1991
- Genre: Arcade motorcycle racing
- Modes: Single-player, multiplayer

Racing Damashii (レーシング魂; Racing Spirit) is a motorcycle racing video game from Irem for the Game Boy handheld and the PC Engine console, released in 1991 exclusively in Japan. The game features tracks all over Japan.

== See also ==
- MotoRace USA
- List of PC Engine games
- List of games for the original Game Boy
- Bari Bari Densetsu
- GP-1
- GP-1: Part II
