= Shin Megami Tensei: Devil Children =

Video game series

- White Book cover art, featuring its main character and multiple demons
- Genre: Role-playing
- Developers: Multimedia Intelligence Transfer, Enterbrain, Index Corporation
- Publishers: Atlus, Enterbrain
- Artist: Yuji Himukai
- Composer: Tomoyuki Hamada
- Platforms: Game Boy Color, Game Boy Advance, PlayStation, mobile phones
- First release: Black Book and Red Book; November 17, 2000
- Latest release: Shin Megami Tensei: Devil Children; July 13, 2011
- Parent series: Megami Tensei

Shin Megami Tensei: Devil Children, (Note: Shin Megami Tensei: Devil Children (真・女神転生 デビルチルドレン, Shin Megami Tensei: Debiru Chirudoren; lit. "True Goddess Reincarnation: Devil Children")) also known as DemiKids, is a series of role-playing video games primarily developed by Multimedia Intelligence Transfer and published by Atlus. It is a spin-off from Atlus' Megami Tensei franchise, and began in 2000 with the Game Boy Color games Black Book and Red Book. Five more role-playing games and three games in other genres were released until 2004, followed by no new releases until the 2011 social game Shin Megami Tensei: Devil Children. In addition to the games, the series has been adapted into manga, anime, and a trading card game, and two soundtrack albums have been released by First Smile Entertainment.

The series follows demon-human hybrids called devil children, who journey from Japan to the demon world, and are joined by talking companion monsters who give them guidance. The player takes the role of one such devil child, and battles against demons; the devil children do not fight directly themselves, however, but have allied demons in their party fight for them. The player can choose to talk to demons instead of fighting them, to try to make them join the player's party, and can increase their allied demons' power by fusing multiple demons with each other.

While Multimedia Intelligence Transfer developed most of the games in the series, Enterbrain and Index Corporation also developed one game each. The music for the first two games was composed by Tomoyuki Hamada, who made use of both orchestral music and rock. Yuji Himukai, known for his work on the Etrian Odyssey series, worked as character designer and illustrator on the 2011 game, creating new art for returning characters. The series received a wide range of reviews, from negative to positive. Reviewers enjoyed the demon fusion, while the music and visuals were criticized.

== Titles ==
Timeline of release years
2000	Black Book and Red Book
2001	White Book
2002	Light Book and Dark Book
2003	Puzzle de Call!
2003	Book of Fire and Book of Ice
2004	Messiah Riser
2005
2006
2007
2008
2009
2010
2011	Shin Megami Tensei: Devil Children

=== Role-playing games ===
- Shin Megami Tensei: Devil Children – Black Book and Red Book were released for the Game Boy Color on November 17, 2000, in Japan, and re-released digitally through the Virtual Console service on the Nintendo 3DS on November 13, 2013. A PlayStation remake of both games was released on March 28, 2002, and re-released digitally on the PlayStation Store on October 13, 2010. Black Book follows Setsuna, whose little brother has been kidnapped by an army of Jack Frosts and taken to the demon world, and who is accompanied by the Cerberus Cool. Red Book follows Mirai, whose father has disappeared in the demon world, and who is accompanied by the pink griffon Veil.
- Shin Megami Tensei: Devil Children – White Book was released for the Game Boy Color on July 27, 2001, in Japan. A sequel to the first two games, it follows Masaki, who has a connection to a quiet boy named Takaharu, and who is accompanied by the green chimera Cray.
- Shin Megami Tensei: Devil Children – Light Book and Dark Book were released for the Game Boy Advance on November 15, 2002, in Japan and on October 7, 2003, in North America as DemiKids: Light Version and Dark Version. Light Version follows Jin, who is sucked into Valhalla and fights against the Imperium forces together with the rebels; he is accompanied by the Sun Lion Rand. Dark Version follows Akira, who is summoned by Lucifer to a land called Dem, and is tasked with erasing portals; he is accompanied by the dragon Gale.
- Shin Megami Tensei: Devil Children – Book of Fire and Book of Ice were released for the Game Boy Advance on September 12, 2003, in Japan. They are sequels to Light Version and Dark Version, again following Jin and Akira.

=== Others ===
- Shin Megami Tensei: Devil Children – Puzzle de Call! was released for the Game Boy Advance on July 25, 2003, in Japan. It is a puzzle game starring Jin and Akira from Light Version and Dark Version.
- Shin Megami Tensei: Devil Children – Messiah Riser was released for the Game Boy Advance on November 4, 2004, in Japan. It is a real-time strategy game starring Jin and Akira from Light Version and Dark Version.
- Shin Megami Tensei: Devil Children was released for mobile phones through the social networking service GREE on July 13, 2011, in Japan. It is a free-to-play social game, and the first entry in the series since 2004. Mirai and Setsuna from Black Book and Red Book appear as navigator characters, assisting the player.

== Common elements ==
While the Devil Children games are released in pairs, similarly to the Pokémon series, each release is its own separate game, with its own story and protagonist, although the stories in each pair's two releases sometimes intertwine. The series' protagonists are the titular "devil children", or "demikids" – children who are demon-human hybrids, and wield superpowers. They all live in modern-day Japan, but end up traveling to the demon world as part of their adventures. The devil children are given weaponry, such as guns, and are joined by guiding companion monsters who can speak human language.

The player battles enemy demons using their own allied demons, shown as icons at the bottom of the screen.

The Devil Children titles are role-playing games in which the player battles against demons. While the player controls a devil child, that character does not directly fight themselves; instead, they send in their allied demons to fight against the opponents. This was changed in Book of Fire and Book of Ice, where the devil children are able to fight by using cards. If one of the player's demons falls in battle, another is automatically sent in to take the first one's place. To recruit new demons to their party, the player needs to choose to talk to the demon instead of fighting it, with the demon's response mostly being based on chance. The player can trade demons with other players, which is required to be able to collect all demon types. While the player's character gains experience points, their allied demons do not; to increase their power, the player needs to fuse their demons with each other.

The non-role-playing games all have different gameplay: Puzzle de Call! is a puzzle game in which the player pushes around boxes to make their way to the pentagram at the end of each screen. Additionally, there is an egg placed in each screen, which disappears if the player does not reach it in a certain number of turns; if they reach it in time, it hatches, giving the player a new demon that can be used when solving the puzzles. Each level, which consists of a number of screens, ends with a boss battle in which the player needs to collect icons while avoiding the bosses' attacks. Messiah Riser is a real-time strategy game in which the player battles by giving their demons commands. It focuses entirely on combat, with no exploration segments between battles. The 2011 Shin Megami Tensei: Devil Children is a social game in which the player collects demons, referred to as "devils", and complete quests to become the strongest Devil King; the player can test themselves in daily tournaments. Like in the earlier games, collected demons can be fused with each other; there is also an added "social fusion" feature, where the player can fuse one of their demons with another player's demon. Players can also help one another by giving them demons and money.

== Development ==
TMS Entertainment created the 2000–2001 DeviChil anime.

Devil Children was created presumably as a response to the popularity of the Pokémon series of games, and as an alternative take on the game Shin Megami Tensei for younger players, featuring child characters and cute monsters. Most of the games were developed by Multimedia Intelligence Transfer and published by Atlus, and the 2011 Shin Megami Tensei: Devil Children, which was developed by Index Corporation. The only games in the series to have been released in English are Dark Version and Light Version. The soundtracks for Black Book and Red Book were composed by Tomoyuki Hamada from the group T's Music, using orchestral music blended with elements of rock. For the 2011 game, Yuji Himukai, known for his work on Atlus' Etrian Odyssey series, was tasked with creating new designs and illustrations of Mirai and Setsuna; they were designed to look older than in their original appearances in Black Book and Red Book.

== Anime series ==
- DeviChil
- Genre: Adventure; Fantasy; Comedy drama
- Anime television series
- Directed by: Yoshio Takeuchi
- Produced by: Naotsugu Katō; Taihei Yamanishi; Yasumichi Ozaki
- Written by: Shinzō Fujita
- Music by: Ryō Yoshimata
- Studio: TMS Entertainment
- Licensed by: Bandai Entertainment
- Original network: JNN (CBC, TBS)
- Original run: October 7, 2000 – September 29, 2001
- Episodes: 50
- Anime television series

D-Children: Light & Dark
- Directed by: Tetsuya Kobayashi (#1–26); Shin Misawa (#27–52)
- Produced by: Naoki Sasada; Takeshi Sasamura
- Written by: Shinzō Fujita
- Music by: Ryō Yoshimata
- Studio: Actas (#1–26); Studio Comet (#27–52)
- Licensed by: Bandai Entertainment
- Original network: AT-X, TXN (TV Tokyo)
- Original run: October 5, 2002 – September 27, 2003
- Episodes: 52

The popularity of the series in Japan led to the creation of two anime series and two manga series, as well as a trading card game. The first anime, Shin Megami Tensei: DeviChil, was produced by CBC, Dentsu, and TMS Entertainment, with additional animation provided by Actas. It aired for 50 episodes from October 7, 2000, to September 29, 2001; the second, Shin Megami Tensei: D-Children – Light & Dark, aired for 52 episodes from October 5, 2002, to September 27, 2003, and was produced by TV Tokyo and NAS. Actas animated the first half of the series, and Studio Comet animated the second half. Two Devil Children music albums were released by First Smile Entertainment on December 20, 2000, and February 21, 2001: Shin Megami Tensei: Devil Children Perfect Soundtracks, which features the soundtracks of Black Book and Red Book, as well as one vocal theme composed by Hiro Takahashi and one by Nao Ito; and Shin Megami Tensei: Devil Children Arrange Tracks, which features new arrangements by Hamada and Motoi Sakuraba of Black Book and Red Book music. There were plans for individual soundtrack albums for Black Book and Red Book, but they were cancelled due to low demand.

== Reception ==
Japanese and Western review scores As of November 1, 2016.
Game	Famitsu	Metacritic
Black Book and Red Book	28/40 (GBC); 27/40 (PS)	–
White Book	30/40	–
Light Version and Dark Version	30/40	62/100
Puzzle de Call!	23/40	–
Book of Fire and Book of Ice	28/40	–
Messiah Riser	24/40	–

Devil Children has received a wide range of reviews, ranging from negative to positive. Writers at Famitsu commented that the series did not change much between installments, although one said they enjoyed the stability and reliability in that. Kurt Kalata and Christopher J. Snelgrove of Hardcore Gaming 101 described the games as "relatively decent for being fairly conventional RPGs".

Several writers at Famitsu praised the demon fusion mechanic, with one of them calling it the best aspect of the game. Kalata and Snelgrove noted that the series was unusually simplistic for the Megami Tensei series, but still found its gameplay to have more depth than Pokémon's, and that it was able to challenge the player. On the other hand, GameSpot's Frank Provo said that it was not "nearly as fun or diverse", in his review of Light Version and Dark Version. Reviewing White Book, one writer at Famitsu said that the tempo of the game was good, allowing for a stress-free experience playing the game, while another thought that the enemies were too strong at the beginning, forcing the player to repeatedly fuse their demons to make any progress at all.

Kalata and Snelgrove were critical of the Game Boy Color titles' visuals, and were disappointed in the updated music and graphics in the PlayStation remake, saying that it looked like "a subpar Super Famicom RPG". Famitsu was also critical of the updates, calling them insignificant. Kalata and Snelgrove did however find the Game Boy Advance games' graphics to be a large improvement over the previous games'. Patrick Gann at RPGFan was underwhelmed by the music in Black Book and Red Book, calling it "far from noteworthy" and saying that it had failed to leave a lasting impression on him. Chris Greening at VGMO said that the music fulfilled its purpose within the game, but that it was otherwise poor and "samey", with a few catchy compositions as exceptions.

Kalata and Snelgrove thought that Puzzle de Call featured interesting ideas, but that there was not anything special about it. They enjoyed how Messiah Riser was different from other Japanese role-playing games, but found the user interface hard to use and that the artificial intelligence felt erratic; they also commented on how demons only have one magic attack each made the game feel limiting.
