= Sparkle Snapshots =

2009 video game

- Developer: Atlus
- Publisher: Nintendo
- Series: Print Club
- Platform: Nintendo DSi
- Release: JP: April 22, 2009; NA: November 2, 2009; EU: December 25, 2009
- Genre: Photo booth
- Mode: Single-player

Sparkle Snapshots, released in Japan as Anytime Purikura ☆ Kiradeco Premium (Note: Japanese: いつでもプリクラ☆キラデコプレミアム, Hepburn: Itsu Demo Purikura ☆ Kiradekopuremiamu), is a 2009 video game developed by Atlus and published by Nintendo for the Nintendo DSi's DSiWare service. It is a continuation of Atlus' Print Club series and the first to receive a prominent international release. It was released in Japan in April 2009, North America in November 2009 and PAL territories in December 2009.

== Gameplay ==
As with previous Print Club games, players are able to take selfie photos using the Nintendo DSi Camera and use a wide variety of frames, backgrounds, stamps and outfits to decorate them with the Nintendo DSi's touchscreen. The stylus can be used to draw or write on the photos. The photos can be saved into the Nintendo DSi's storage or sent to other consoles in the vicinity through Nintendo Wi-Fi Connection.

== Reception ==
Desiree Turner of Nintendo Life gave the game a 6/10 score, praising its variety and appeal to young girls, though she criticized its lack of online functionality.

== Sequel ==
Sparkle Snapshots 3D
- Developer: Atlus
- Publisher: Nintendo
- Series: Print Club
- Platform: Nintendo 3DS
- Release: JP: December 27, 2011; NA: July 12, 2012; PAL: October 18, 2012
- Genre: Photo booth
- Mode: Single-player

Sparkle Snapshots 3D, released in Japan as Jumidasu Prikura ☆ Kiradeco Revolution (Note: Japanese: とびだすプリクラ☆キラデコレボリューション, Hepburn: Tobidasu Purikura ☆ Kiradeko Reboryūshon), is a video game developed by Atlus and published by Nintendo for the Nintendo 3DS. The sequel to Sparkle Snapshots, It was released in Japan in November 2011, North America in July 2012 and PAL territories in October 2012. To appeal to a young female audience, Nintendo contracted actress Sarah Hyland to promote the game. It features stereoscopic 3D functionality and downloadable content based on the Mario series.
