= Widget (video game) =

1992 video game

- Developer: Graphic Research
- Publisher: Atlus
- Designers: K. Onishi; R. Saito
- Programmers: R. Takahashi; Y. Mizutani
- Composers: Shinji Tachikawa; Fumito Tamayama; T. Uchibori; Yoko Kawashima
- Platform: Nintendo Entertainment System
- Release: November 1992
- Genres: Action, platform
- Mode: Single-player

Widget is an action-platform video game series created for the Nintendo Entertainment System in the 1990s by Atlus. It was based on the cartoon series Widget the World Watcher, which stars a purple alien named Widget. The original game came out in 1992, followed by the sequel Super Widget on the Super NES in 1993.

== Widget ==
The original Widget video game was released in 1992. In this game, Widget must stop his evil twin from destroying the planet Earth. Widget can shoot pellets out of a gun. There are five levels, and the player can choose which order to play the middle four levels. After beating a level, Widget gains the ability to transform into a new form (including a golem, a cannon, a bird and a speedy mouse).

The game has various bugs, including numerous errors that allow the player to move through walls. Other bugs are capable of crashing the game or warping the player to the next room of a level. Many of these glitches are exploited by speed-runs of the game.

== Super Widget ==
Super Widget
- Cover art
- Developer: Atlus
- Publisher: Atlus
- Designer: Hideyuki Kubota
- Composer: Tomoyuki Hamada
- Platform: Super Nintendo Entertainment System
- Release: 1993
- Genre: 2D action platformer
- Mode: Single-player

Reviews for Super Widget (SNES)

Review scores
Publication	Score
AllGame	2.5/5
Electronic Gaming Monthly	4/10
GamePro	4.5/5 (Note: GamePro scored Super Widget 4.5/5 twice for graphics and control, 5/5 for sound, and 4.5/5 for fun factor.)
Nintendo Power	3.15/5 (Note: Nintendo Power scored 3/5 twice for challenge and play control, 3.5/5 for graphics/sound, and 3.1/5 for theme/fun.)
Superjuegos	77/100
Super Play	54%

Super Widget is a video game for the SNES made in 1993 by Atlus. It is a sequel to Widget for the NES. In the game, a new alien force threatens Earth. Widget, with his sidekick Mega-Brain, must explore the Horsehead Nebula and save the planet once again.

The game is a platform game in which Widget must travel through various planets in his quest to reach the rank of World Watcher. In these planets, Widget would need to traverse rigorous terrain and collect "W" coins along the way. One hundred of the coins would grant Widget an extra life. In his natural state, Widget can only succumb to one hit before losing a life, but if he could find tokens with letters embedded on them, he can transform into a more powerful creature that can take more hits. If he collects another identical token, Widget will evolve once again and take the form of an even greater creature – one that can take three hits before losing a life. If three are collected, the player will get a forcefield that can act as a shield from one hit.

Unlike most platformers, performance is ranked on a grading scale of D-S (with S being the best rank possible). After conquering each level's boss, players are taken to a screen which evaluates the time it took to finish the level, combat rank and overall Watcher experience points. Rankings have no effect on the gameplay or the ending of the game.
