= Heaven's Gate (video game) =

1996 video game

- Japanese arcade flyer of Heaven's Gate.
- Developer: Racdym
- Publisher: Atlus
- Directors: Hideki Yayama; Takeshi Murata
- Producers: Hiroyuki Tanaka; Shinichi Saitoh
- Designer: Yumiko Hattori
- Composers: Kenichi Tsuchiya; Toshiko Tasaki; Misaki Okibe
- Platforms: Arcade, PlayStation
- Release: December 1996
- Genre: Fighting
- Modes: Single-player, multiplayer

Heaven's Gate is a 1996 3D fighting arcade game developed by Racdym and published by Atlus. It is both Atlus and Racdym's first attempt in the 3D fighting game market. While in development, the game was known as "Ultimate Domain", and was intended to run on the Sega Model 2 hardware.

Released in December 1996, The game was ported to the PlayStation by Atlus, being released on December 13, 1996, in Japan. In October 1997, JVC Music Europe published it in Europe under the title Yusha: Heaven's Gate.

== Reception ==
German magazine Maniac gave it a score of 70/100.

French magazine Joypad gave it 75%.
