= GP-1: Part II =

1994 video game

- Japanese cover art
- Developer(s): Genki
- Publisher(s): JP: Atlus; NA: Atlus
- Composer(s): Takane Okubo; Mimura Kazunari
- Series: GP-1
- Platform(s): SNES
- Release: JP: November 18, 1994; NA: December 1994
- Genre(s): Arcade-style racing (motorcycle)
- Mode(s): Single-player, multiplayer

GP-1: Part II, known in Japan as GP-1 RS: Rapid Stream, (Note: Japanese: ＧＰ－１ ラピッドストリーム) is a motorcycle racing game developed by Genki and published by Atlus for the SNES, which was released in 1994. It is a sequel to GP-1.

== Gameplay ==
Screenshot showing the gameplay.

In GP-1 Part II, players must control a motorcycle, making turns without leaving the track. The game features three game modes: "GP Race" which is present along with a "Practice" and "Race" mode, "Time Attack" which is a race against the clock, and "Vs Battle" which is a standard two player competitive mode. AI racers do not compete in "Vs Battle" mode.

The Japanese version uses a battery-backed save, while the North American version uses a password save.

GP Race mode is a kind of career/season mode, where the player competes to earn a place on the podium. The Japanese version begins with a qualifying round in Japan (United States in the Western version, although the tracks are the same as in the Japanese version), consisting of four local tracks, followed by the GP-1 World Championship (featuring all 14 circuits of the real-life 1994 Grand Prix motorcycle racing season). At the Japanese qualifying round, there are only three available motorcycles. In the world championship another three motorcycles are available.

In the world championship, the player competes against racers from around the world in 14 tracks. Rival racers will intimidate and challenge the player to bet a few bucks on which one will finish the race ahead of the other, but betting is optional. The money earned from rivals or winning races can be used to upgrade the motorcycle. Earning enough points will let the player obtain better parts for their bike.

=== Tracks ===
==== Japanese Championship ====
- (Japan) View Sight (Fuji)
- (Japan) Mountain (Sugo)
- (Japan) Twin Head (Tsukuba)
- Japan (Suzuka; also Round 3 of the World Championship)

==== World Championship ====
- Australia (Eastern Creek)
- Malaysia (Shah Alam Circuit)
- Japan (Suzuka)
- Spain (Jerez)
- Austria (Salzburgring)
- Germany (Hockenheimring)
- Netherlands (Assen)
- Italy (Mugello)
- France (Le Mans)
- (United Kingdom) Great Britain (Donington Park)
- Czech Republic (Brno)
- United States (Laguna Seca)
- Argentina (Buenos Aires)
- Europe (Barcelona)

== Reception ==
In their review, GamePro commented that though GP-1 Part II features some improvements over the original, such as more tracks, it drops many of the touches which made the original a standout game. This made it an overall decent but undistinguished title with nothing to make consumers choose it over the many other racing games on the market.

== See also ==
- Racing Damashii
- Bari Bari Densetsu
