= Kat's Run: All Japan K-Car Championship =

1995 video game

- Cover art
- Developer(s): Varie
- Publisher(s): Atlus
- Platform(s): Super Famicom
- Release: JP: July 14, 1995
- Genre(s): Arcade racing
- Mode(s): Single-player; Multiplayer

Kat's Run: All Japan K-Car Championship (Note: Kat's Run: Zen-Nippon K Car Senshuken (キャッツラン 全日本Kカー選手権)) is a racing video game, published by Atlus, which was released exclusively in Japan in 1995. As the title implies, the playable vehicles are all kei cars.

There are two playable modes: Street race and V.S. race, which has four selectable courses. The player can choose ten different characters/drivers and ten vehicles, respectively.

== Reception ==
Reception

Review score
Publication	Score
The Super Famicom	68/100

On release, Famicom Tsūshin scored the game an 18 out of 40.
