= Trap Gunner =

1998 video game

- North American box art
- Developer: Racdym
- Publishers: JP/NA: Atlus; EU: Konami
- Platform: PlayStation
- Release: JP: August 6, 1998; NA: September 30, 1998; EU: June 6, 1999
- Genres: Action, strategy, puzzle
- Modes: Single-player, multiplayer

Trap Gunner: Countdown to Oblivion, or just Trap Gunner (トラップガンナー, Torappu Gannā), known in Europe as Trap Runner, is a PlayStation video game published by Atlus in 1998, and by Konami in 1999. It is a strategy, arcade-style game for one or two players.

== Gameplay ==
The purpose of the game to run around various levels and to set traps, which are invisible to your opponent. Players can shoot at one another while setting traps. Each character has a different melee weapon with unique attributes.

The story mode unveils each character's background and relation to the other characters.

== Reception ==
Reception

Aggregate score
Aggregator	Score
GameRankings	71%

Review scores
Publication	Score
AllGame	3/5
CNET Gamecenter	7/10
Consoles +	77%
Computer and Video Games	2/5
Electronic Gaming Monthly	5.75/10 (Note: In Electronic Gaming Monthly's review of the game, one critic gave it a score of 7/10, another gave it 6/10, and the rest gave it each a score of 5/10.)
Famitsu	29/40
GameSpot	7/10
IGN	8.9/10
Next Generation	4/5
Official U.S. PlayStation Magazine	2.5/5

GamePro said, "Those who are searching for a good mix of real-time strategy and fighting will find that Trap Gunner fits the bill." (Note: GamePro gave the game two 4/5 scores for graphics and overall fun factor, and two 3.5/5 scores for sound and control.) Next Generation called it "one of the season's sleeper hits." In Japan, Famitsu gave it a score of 29 out of 40.
