= GP-1 =

1993 video game

- Japanese cover art
- Developer: Genki
- Publisher: Atlus
- Composer: Masanao Akahori (Opus Corp.)
- Series: GP-1
- Platform: Super Nintendo Entertainment System
- Release: JP: June 25, 1993; NA: September 1993; EU: 1993
- Genre: Arcade-style racing (motorcycle)
- Modes: Single-player, multiplayer

GP-1 is a motorcycle racing game developed by Genki and published by Atlus for the SNES, which was released in 1993. It was followed by a sequel, GP-1: Part II.

== Gameplay ==
Screenshot showing GP-1's machine and mechanic selection.

There is an Exhibition mode that can support two players and the Season mode. It is possible to choose between six bikes, and six different engineers whose skills match the player's racing style. While there are a variety of bikes with slightly different engines, suspensions and frames, there is no real difference between the engineers, but they will still influence the improvement or deterioration of the bike performance.

To be a successful racer, the player must invest in the best equipment and fine-tune their bike so that it runs at an optimal level. To do this, the player will have to race against 15 opponents on 13 tracks (following the same order of the real-life 1992 Grand Prix motorcycle racing season) in order to win money. The game features real tracks from all over the world. However, even though the display on the menu is correct for the tracks, some turns are wrong or non-existent during the actual gameplay. During the championship, the player will receive money for getting the first positions on each race, which makes it possible to upgrade parts of the bike and fine-tune it for better performance. While learning each course, the player will have to find the perfect racing line in order to have a chance at winning. In Grand Prix racing, there is a fine line between executing the ideal turn and making a mistake that will send the player flying off their bike and tumbling down the track.

The soundtrack of GP-1 was composed by Masanao Akahori.

== Racetracks ==
- Japan (Suzuka)
- Australia (Eastern Creek)
- Malaysia (Shah Alam Circuit)
- Spain (Jerez)
- Italy (Mugello)
- Europe (Barcelona)
- Germany (Hockenheimring)
- Netherlands (Assen)
- Hungary (Hungaroring)
- France (Magny-Cours)
- (United Kingdom) Great Britain (Donington Park)
- Brazil (Interlagos)
- South Africa (Kyalami)

== Reception ==
Reception

Review score
Publication	Score
Super Play	62%

GamePro gave the game a rating of 4 out of 5. German video gaming magazine Total! gave the game a rating of 3.25 out of 6.

== See also ==
- GP-1: Part II - video game sequel
- Racing Damashii
- Bike Daisuki! Hashiriya Kon – Rider's Spirits
- Bari Bari Densetsu
