= Shin Megami Tensei II =

1994 role-playing video game

- Super Famicom cover art, featuring the archangels and several of the main characters
- Developer: Atlus
- Publisher: Atlus
- Director: Kouji Okada
- Producer: Hideyuki Yokoyama
- Artist: Kazuma Kaneko
- Writer: Ryutaro Ito
- Composer: Tsukasa Masuko
- Series: Megami Tensei
- Platforms: Super Famicom, PlayStation, Game Boy Advance, iOS, Android
- Release: March 18, 1994: Super Famicom; JP: March 18, 1994 PlayStation; JP: March 20, 2002 Game Boy Advance; JP: September 26, 2003 iOS; JP: June 12, 2012 Android; JP: December 21, 2012
- Genre: Role-playing
- Mode: Single-player

Shin Megami Tensei II (Note: Shin Megami Tensei II (Japanese: 真・女神転生II; "True Goddess Reincarnation II")) is a post-apocalyptic role-playing video game developed and published by Atlus. It was originally released for the Super Famicom in 1994 in Japan, and has since been ported to multiple platforms. It is the second game in the Shin Megami Tensei series, which is a subset of the larger Megami Tensei franchise.

The gameplay comprises first-person exploration of dungeons and battles against demons; the player can also choose to speak to the demons, and attempt to recruit them to their party. By fusing multiple allied demons together, the player can create more powerful demons. The story is set decades after the first Shin Megami Tensei, in the encapsulated city Tokyo Millennium, which is ruled by the religious Messians from a unit called the center. The player takes the role of a gladiator who is told that he is the Messiah, and is sent on missions around Tokyo Millennium to eradicate demons and prepare for the Thousand-Year Kingdom. The plot is influenced by choices the player makes throughout the game, determining their moral alignment.

The game was created to not have direct connections to the first Shin Megami Tensei, to ensure that it was interesting independently; this led character designer Kazuma Kaneko to create the concept of a story vaguely based on Shin Megami Tensei's future. Reviewers enjoyed the gameplay and the lowered difficulty compared to the prior game; some appreciated the plot and themes, but some thought that certain themes, while fresh at the time of release, felt clichéd in retrospect.

== Gameplay ==
The player fights demons in first person. Here, they have two humans and one allied demon in their party.

In Shin Megami Tensei II, the player takes the role of the gladiator Hawk, who is able to communicate with demons. The gameplay is similar to that of the first Shin Megami Tensei: the game is controlled from a first-person view, and has the player exploring dungeons and navigating outdoor areas, which are presented as 2D maps seen from a top-down perspective. In both these types of areas, the player encounters and battles against demons; a gauge on the bottom of the screen shows the likelihood of a demon encounter.

The player is able to speak to demons instead of fighting them, and can try to form an alliance with them; these negotiations involve the player trying to increase the demon's mood, and start with the player picking an attitude – friendly or intimidating – after which they get to choose how to respond to what the demon says or does, and whether to give the demon items or money it asks for. Demons act differently depending on their personality, as well as the in-game phase of the moon; it is impossible to converse with demons during full moon, forcing the player to fight or flee. Depending on choices the player makes throughout the game, their moral alignment changes; the different alignments are "law", "chaos", and "neutrality". These affect how the plot progresses, and how easy or difficult it is to form alliances with certain demon types, depending on how compatible the player's and the demon's alignments are.

The player can acquire stronger demons by fusing two or three allied demons together, resulting in a single, predetermined type of demon; there is however a small chance that a "fusion accident" occurs, resulting in a demon other than the type the fusion was thought to produce. Fused demons can "inherit" abilities from the demons used to create it, including ones a demon of its type normally would be unable to have. Demons can also be fused with weapons to create powerful swords for the player to use.

== Plot ==
=== Setting and characters ===
Shin Megami Tensei II is set in the year "20XX", decades after the events of Shin Megami Tensei, where a war between angels and demons was fought. Opposing both sides, a man called the Hero created a world where both Law and Chaos could co-exist, where people had freedom to choose and believe what they wished. In the time between the two games, the world was plagued by disasters, and the air became unbreathable. People flocked to the encapsulated city Tokyo Millennium, which was built atop the ruins of Tokyo, where mutants, fairies and demons live. The city is ruled by followers of the Messian religion in a central unit called the center, and is divided into districts; the largest one is Valhalla, where people can compete in a gladiator tournament, with the winner gaining citizenship in the luxurious Center, which is out of reach from demons.

The game follows Hawk, an amnesic Valhalla gladiator who trains at his mentor Okamoto's gym. Among other recurring characters are Hiroko, a rebellious temple knight; Beth, a woman from the center who vows to always stay by Hawk's side; Daleth, who claims to be the Messiah, and fights Hawk multiple times; Zayin, a temple knight; and Gimmel, a man from the Arcadia forest, who knows Hawk from somewhere. Early in the game, Hawk meets a man named Steven, who grants Hawk the "Demon Summoning Program" for Hawk's arm terminal, allowing him to summon demons.

=== Story ===
Hawk wins the gladiator tournament in Valhalla, gaining citizenship in the center, and is asked by Hiroko to help her find a boy who has gone missing. Upon their failure to find him, they are escorted by Zayin to the center, where they meet the Messian bishop. He reprimands Hiroko for acting independently and tells Hawk that his true identity is Aleph, the Messiah, who will save mankind and bring about the paradisiacal "Thousand-Year Kingdom", and that Beth was sent by God as the Messiah's partner. The Center sends Aleph and Beth on missions across Tokyo Millennium to eradicate demons and prepare the world for the Thousand-Year Kingdom. They meet with Gimmel, and are shown Arcadia, a prototype of the Thousand-Year Kingdom. Returning to the center, they learn that demons have invaded and that someone the bishop calls the Anti-Messiah is proclaiming to the people that he is the true Messiah. Aleph and Beth are sent to stop him, and learn that he is a man named Daleth. During the ensuing fight, Daleth nearly kills Aleph, but Beth sacrifices herself, allowing Aleph to regain the upper hand. Honoring Beth's dying wish, he spares Daleth, and is considered the true Messiah.

Together with the demon Nadja, Aleph travels through the underground, finding a brainwashed Hiroko in a concentration camp. Her cell is guarded by Zayin, who admits to having doubts about the center's action and lets Aleph free Hiroko; she refuses to leave, but Nadja frees her from the brainwashing by fusing with her. On their way back, Aleph and Hiroko learn that the center has released the demon Abaddon to swallow the entire Valhalla district, and that the Center only plans to let those they deem worthy be allowed to live in the Thousand-Year Kingdom; everyone else would be abandoned and left to die. Zayin starts a revolt against the center, who threatens to cut off the air supply to the Holytown district if he does not surrender; he, Aleph and Hiroko go to the center to confront the four elders leading it. Aleph and Hiroko learn that the elders are actually the archangels Michael, Raphael, Uriel and Gabriel; Aleph and Hiroko fight and kill the first three archangels, after which Gabriel reveals that YHVH, the creator god, had ordered the archangels to watch over the creation of Tokyo Millennium and wait for the Messiah, but that Michael, Raphael and Uriel, unable to wait any longer, created Aleph as an artificial, false Messiah, leading YHVH to abandon them; he was the boy Hiroko was searching for, aged unnaturally fast to take on the role of Messiah. Similarly, Beth was artificially created as the Messiah's partner, Zayin as his bodyguard, Daleth as a false savior intended to be defeated by the Messiah so that Aleph would win the people's favor, and Gimmel as a trial Messiah for the Arcadia prototype.

Suspecting that Aleph is Satan, Lucifer summons Aleph and Hiroko to his castle in the Expanse; he is relieved to learn that Aleph is not Satan, but says that Satan's revival is only a matter of time. He tells them that Satan is an instrument of God's wrath, to be used to judge and eradicate humanity, and that he wants Aleph and Hiroko's help in fighting Satan. Leaving Lucifer's castle, Aleph and Hiroko meet Gabriel, who takes them to the garden of Eden, located on top of the center, where they meet Zayin – revealed to be Satan (after Zayin merges with the demon Set) – who wants to ally with Aleph and Hiroko and fight Lucifer, destroy Tokyo Millennium, and create the Thousand-Year Kingdom. If the player joins Gabriel and Zayin, the Thousand-Year Kingdom is created through Eden — revealed to be a vast spaceship carrying the chosen ones — and the destruction of all life on Earth. YHVH appears aboard Eden, and Zayin, Aleph and Hiroko fight and kill him, after which Zayin declares Aleph the true savior, and Hiroko the holy mother, and then crumbles to dust. If the player instead allies with Lucifer or stays neutral, Aleph and Hiroko kill Zayin before he can activate the destruction; Aleph is dubbed a false Messiah and commits the "ultimate sin" by killing YHVH, freeing humanity.

== Development ==
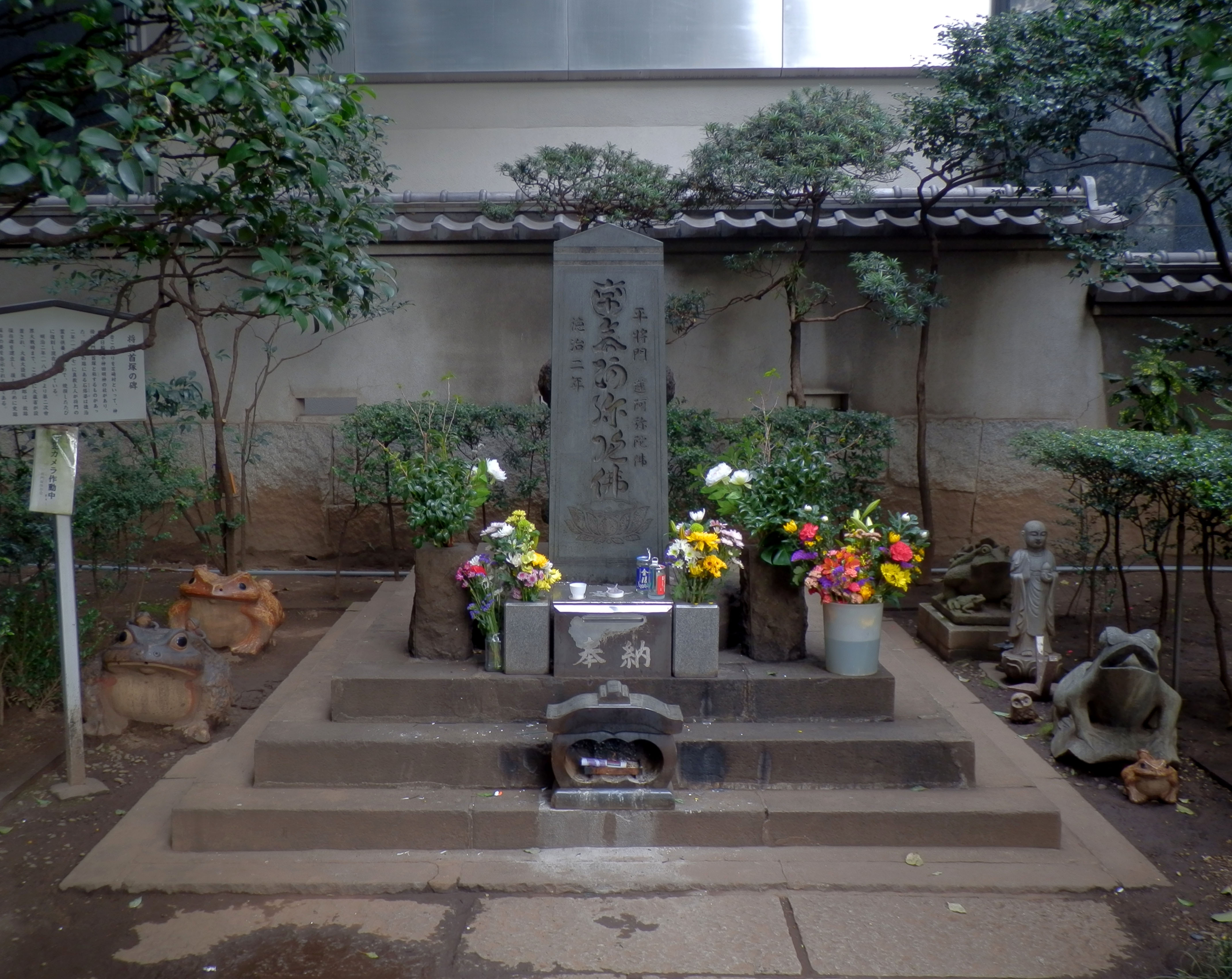
Atlus visited Taira no Masakado's grave (pictured) and Hariti's temple during the pre-production to get cleansed.

Shin Megami Tensei II was developed by Atlus for the Super Famicom. It was directed by Kouji Okada, produced by Hideyuki Yokoyama, and written by Ryutaro Ito, with music composed by Tsukasa Masuko. Kazuma Kaneko designed the game's characters, but was also involved in the planning phase. During the game's pre-production, the development staff visited Hariti's temple in Zōshigaya and Taira no Masakado's grave to cleanse themselves. They had done this before, first during the development of the first Shin Megami Tensei; after one of the staff members got robbed, they decided to do it regularly. The inspiration to do this came from Go Nagai, who was said to have exorcised a spirit with the help of Hariti while writing the manga Devilman.

During the game's planning, it was decided that it should not be directly connected to Shin Megami Tensei, ensuring that it would hold interest independent from the first game; because of this, Kaneko envisioned it as a story loosely based on Shin Megami Tensei's future. At first, he imagined it to take place ten years after the first game, as he thought that would be roughly the amount of time needed for society to rebuild, but another staff member wanted it to take place hundreds of years later. Kaneko disagreed, saying that culture would have changed a lot over a hundred years, and that he could not even imagine what the world would look like a hundred years into the future or what it had been like during the Meiji era. The two had different ideas about the timeline of the series, but eventually decided to set the game "several decades" after Shin Megami Tensei. They made use of the tree of life as a central theme of the story.

According to Kaneko, the reason for choosing the Judeo-Christian-Islamic god, YHVH, as the game's antagonist, was that he saw YHVH as the base for all other gods around the world: Having observed common motives throughout different mythologies, such as the flood and the creation of the world, he reasoned that they all originated in one single mythology, which had been changed as people took it with them, leading to modern-day myths. He thought the original mythology would be the Old Testament, and therefore considered YHVH the folkloristic base of all gods. Despite casting YHVH as the antagonist, Kaneko noted that he did not intend for YHVH to be evil incarnate in Megami Tensei.

=== Character design ===
Aleph was created to embody the Shin Megami Tensei II world, which is reflected in his character design: he has a portable computer and a visor that he controls demons with, and carries swords, guns and armor for use in battle. His computer was designed to look compact, and the visor was designed to be wireless, to show that the game takes place in the future. Kaneko decided to not give Aleph a personality, partially because he is controlled by the player, and partially because he is portrayed as an artificial being, created by the center's scientists. Beth and Daleth were designed to look similar to the first Shin Megami Tensei's Heroine and Hero, using the colors blue and green, respectively. Lucifer was visually portrayed as an elegant gentleman, as Kaneko saw him as someone who tempts and tries the player, rather than being evil. He designed Lucifer in accordance with portrayals of him as a beautiful twelve-winged angel, but gave him six wings instead, for a total of twelve across his appearances in Shin Megami Tensei and Shin Megami Tensei II.

Several characters were based on real people: Aleph's mentor Okamoto was named after the owner of the building Atlus occupied during the game's development; Matsumoto was named after Ito's first landlord in Tokyo; and Mekata was named after an NHK reporter. Additionally, Red Bear was named after the evil organization from the superhero film Aikoku Sentai Dainippon. Some character designs were created with the Super Famicom hardware limitations in mind: Kaneko designed three different poses for the Twelve Heavenly Generals, which were combined in various ways with graphics for different heads and held items, along with different color palettes, resulting in twelve different combinations. He thought this acceptable as the generals were a group, and were meant to look cohesive.

== Reception and legacy ==
Reception

Review score
Publication	Score		
Publication	GBA	PS	SNES
Famitsu	28/40	8/10, 7/10, 6/10, 7/10	9/10, 8/10, 8/10, 8/10

Famitsu's writers appreciated the amount of freedom the player has. In their reviews of the PlayStation and the Game Boy Advance versions, they said that the gameplay still holds up. They found the demon fusion system to be excellent and fun, and did not think it felt outdated. Kurt Kalata and Cristopher J. Snelgrove of Hardcore Gaming 101 appreciated the game's lowered difficulty compared to that of the first Shin Megami Tensei.

Kalata and Snelgrove did not think the game's story started "with the same pizzazz" as Shin Megami Tensei; they thought that "the amnesiac savior" is a "lame cliche", and that the idea that Western religion is evil has been worn out. They did however also say that Shin Megami Tensei II came out before these elements were overused, and that they "undoubtedly" were fresh at the time. In his book Game Magic: A Designer's Guide to Magic Systems in Theory and Practice, Jeff Howard used Shin Megami Tensei II as an example of a video game with allusions to Kabbalah, with its use of Hebrew letters as character names; he said that this contributes to the atmosphere, and gives a feeling of depth or mystery. Famitsu appreciated the game's "grand and unique" theme, its "profound" dark worldview and scenario.

Chris at Square Enix Music Online disliked the game's music: he called it the worst in the whole series, and said that the music pieces tend to be monotone and based on repetition of nothingness. He said that slowly building ambient pieces such as "Title Demo", "Title", and "Memory Recovery" are effective in context, but that they are too simple and repetitive to be enjoyable as stand-alone music. He did however find the pieces "Disco" and "Casino" both humorous and catchy. Kyle Miller and Damian Thomas, both writing for RPGFan, were more positive to the music. Miller found the soundtrack well made, but worse than that of the first Shin Megami Tensei. The pieces he liked the most were "Heretic Mansion" and some battle themes. He also liked "Casino", which he found catchy and thought worked as an effective contrast to the dread of the other pieces. Thomas found the soundtrack to be excellent, and said that while several pieces are short, they have solid melodies. Kalata and Snelgrove appreciated the music that is played during battles. Famitsu thought the PlayStation version's graphics looked "cheap".

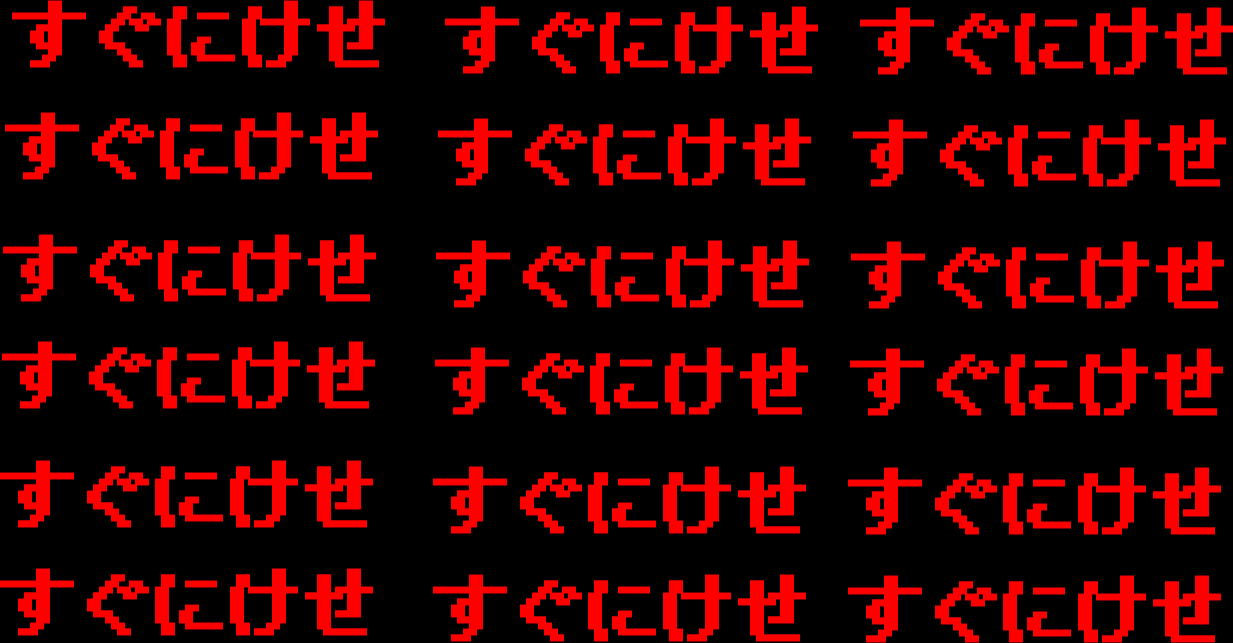
Reproduced "Sugu ni Kese" screen

A popular urban legend in Japan is that there is a 1/65536 chance of the game's intro freezing and displaying the red text saying "Sugu ni Kese" (Japanese: すぐにけせ; lit. 'Turn it off' or 'Delete immediately') repeatedly on the screen when players power on the SNES version of the game. The Megami Tensei game designer Kazunari Suzuki denied the rumor. Persona 4 Arena pre-release referenced the urban legend. The special gifts for pre-order players of Shin Megami Tensei IV include a printed eraser with the message "Sugu ni Kese". In June 2023, a Chinese leaker referenced the urban legend to tease the announcement of Shin Megami Tensei V: Vengeance.
