= Shin Megami Tensei (video game) =

1992 role-playing video game

- Super Famicom box art, featuring the main characters and multiple demons from the game
- Developer: Atlus
- Publisher: Atlus
- Director: Yōsuke Niino
- Producer: Hideyuki Yokoyama
- Programmer: Kouji Okada
- Artist: Kazuma Kaneko
- Writers: Ryutaro Ito; Kazunari Suzuki
- Composer: Tsukasa Masuko
- Series: Megami Tensei
- Platforms: Super Famicom; PC Engine CD-ROM; Mega-CD; PlayStation; Game Boy Advance; iOS; Android
- Release: October 30, 1992: Super Famicom; JP: October 30, 1992 PC Engine CD-ROM; JP: December 25, 1993 Mega-CD; JP: February 25, 1994 PlayStation; JP: May 31, 2001 Game Boy Advance; JP: March 28, 2003 iOS; JP: March 20, 2012; NA/EU: March 18, 2014 Android; JP: November 1, 2012
- Genre: Role-playing
- Mode: Single-player

Shin Megami Tensei (Note: Shin Megami Tensei (Japanese: 真・女神転生; translated as "True Goddess Reincarnation")) is a role-playing video game developed and published by Atlus for the Super Famicom. Originally released in 1992 in Japan, it has been ported to multiple systems and eventually released in the West for iOS in 2014. It was released on the Virtual Console service in Japan on Wii in 2007 and on Wii U in 2013, as well as the Nintendo Classics service in 2020. It is the third game in the Megami Tensei series and the first in the central Shin Megami Tensei series. The gameplay uses first-person navigation of dungeons and turn-based battles against demons. The player can recruit demons as allies by talking to them rather than fighting them, and two to three demons can be fused to create new demons.

The story follows a player-named protagonist who lives in near-future Tokyo. When a portal to the realm of demons is opened accidentally by a scientist named Steven and is seized by Gotou, a military commander who believes that he can control the demons, the United States government orders a nuclear attack on Tokyo. Transported with two other supporting characters thirty years into the future, the protagonist finds the Earth ruined by a demon invasion, which is now the stage for an escalating conflict between the Order of Messiah and the Ring of Gaia, conflicting cults who wish to bring about kingdoms for their respective patron deities (Yahweh and Lucifer). The story is influenced by moral decisions the protagonist makes, aligning him either with the Messians, the Ring of Gaia, or setting him up as an independent agent.

From the start of the production, Atlus staff saw Shin Megami Tensei as a chance to create a game with the company's brand on it. The staff saw it as a remake of the previous Megami Tensei game; because of this, they knew what was going to happen in the story, and the development went smoothly. The story went through multiple revisions, and many settings were inspired by the staff's personal lives. The character and demon designs were done by Kazuma Kaneko, who used mythical figures and multiple clothing styles in his designs. Critical and commercial reception for the game have been highly positive, and its success helped launch Atlus as a developer and publisher, along with popularizing the Megami Tensei series.

== Gameplay ==
A battle in the iOS version, showing enemies in the top half, and the status of the player's party in the bottom

In Shin Megami Tensei, players take the role of an unnamed protagonist, a teenage boy who can communicate with demons using a computer program. The gameplay is similar to that of other games in the series: players make their way through dungeons and fight against demons in a first-person perspective. The protagonist uses a variety of weapons and items, with the primary weapons being swords and guns. Such items are bought from merchants scattered around the world map. In special areas, the protagonist can use the in-game currency to restore health and magic points for themselves and their demons, remove status ailments, and revive fallen demons. Special Terminals scattered across the world map allow the player to save their game, and they can use them to teleport between terminals in different areas of Tokyo.

Battles are turn-based, and consist of players letting the characters in their party attack with swords or guns, summon demons, or cast magic spells; both demons and humans, with the exception of the player character, are able to use magic. By participating in battles, human characters in the player's party receive experience points; by accumulating these points, the characters' levels rise and new abilities are randomly learned. Players can choose to talk to demons instead of fighting them; they can ask the demons for items or money, try to get them to go away, or try to form an alliance with them. At some places, called "Cathedrals of Shadows", players can fuse two to three allied demons into one single, more powerful demon; as demons do not receive experience points, this is the only way for the player to increase their demons' power. Magnetite is used as a fuel for allied demons, and is used up by summoned demons as the player character walks around in the dungeons; if players run out of magnetite, summoned demons take damage.

The way demons behave is based on their and the protagonist's respective alignments. Alignments come in two types, Light-Neutral-Dark, and Law-Neutral-Chaos. A demon's alignment can range across both alignments, resulting in nine possible stances that affect how they behave and what actions in battle or story progression pleases them. The protagonist's alignment changes depending on choices made during the story, and in response the attitudes of people and demons change; for instance, demons who are law-aligned will refuse to form an alliance with chaos-aligned players. Additionally, depending on their alignment, players will not be let into certain areas; for instance, the Order of Messiah will not let chaos-aligned players into their churches.

== Synopsis ==
=== Setting and characters ===
Shin Megami Tensei takes place in a near future Tokyo, first in the year "199X", and then 30 years later in a post-apocalyptic version of the city. A rift has been opened to another world, allowing demons to invade Tokyo; by using a computer program, humans are able to communicate with and summon the demons. Across the story, moral alignments are portrayed in various ways: alongside the middle "neutral" pathway, the "law" faction believes in establishing a logical order at the expense of feeling and freedom, while the "chaos" faction espouses unlimited freedom for the individual while discarding the weak.

The game includes four nameable human "heroes": the player character, the Hero, who is a teenage boy living with his mother and pet dog in Kichijōji in Tokyo; the Heroine, who is the leader of a resistance force which tries to protect Tokyo; and the Law Hero and Chaos Hero, who represent the alignments "law" and "chaos", respectively. Among other characters are ambassador Thorman (トールマン, Tōruman) and general Gotou (ゴトウ), who lead the United States military and the Japan Self-Defense Forces, respectively; the archangel Michael (ミカエル, Mikaeru) and the demon Asura-ou (アスラおう), who lead the Order of Messiah and the Ring of Gaea, respectively; the demons Lilith (リリス, Ririsu) and Lucifer (ルシファー, Rushifā), who use the pseudonyms Yuriko (由利子) and Louis Cyphre (ルイ・サイファー, Rui Saifā); and Stephen, the creator of the demon summoning program.

=== Plot ===
The game begins with the Hero dreaming that he meets the Law Hero, the Chaos Hero, and a woman named Yuriko; she promises that she will become the Hero's partner. He wakes up, and receives an e-mail with a computer program for summoning demons attached. While out on an errand, he learns that a scientist has opened a portal to the Expanse, which allows demons to enter Tokyo. He also meets Yuriko, who says she will fulfill her promise. The next night, the Hero again dreams that he meets the Law Hero and Chaos Hero, and that they save the Heroine from a sacrificial ritual. The next day, he meets the Law Hero and Chaos Hero in reality; they reveal that they had the same dreams. News of the demons spread, and the US military, led by ambassador Thorman, decides to intervene. The Japan Self-Defense Forces, led by general Gotou, opposes them, as they see demons as the ancient spirits of the land. A third group, led by the Heroine, tries to prevent conflict between the other two. She gets captured by Gotou's forces; they are about to publicly execute her under supervision by Yuriko, but she is saved by the Hero, Law Hero, and Chaos Hero. The Hero can choose to support Thorman or Gotou, or to reject both; regardless of his choice, the conflict escalates until Thorman launches missiles towards Tokyo. The Heroine is killed, but saves the Hero, Law Hero, and Chaos Hero by using magic to teleport them to another plane of existence.

When they return to Tokyo, thirty years have passed, and the world lies in ruins. Both demons and humans live in Tokyo, and two warring groups have formed: the Order of Messiah, who is building a cathedral and wants to bring about the Thousand-Year Kingdom, and the Ring of Gaea, who intends to summon Lucifer and wants freedom. While exploring the city, the Chaos Hero fuses himself with a demon to gain power, and decides to leave to pursue his own ideals; the group moves on without him and meet the Heroine, who has been reincarnated and rejoins them. Soon afterwards, the Law Hero's soul gets taken by an attacking demon. The Chaos Hero joins the Ring of Gaea, while the Law Hero's soul gets reincarnated as the new Messiah. Both try to get the Hero to join their respective side; he can choose to support either, or to reject both. Regardless of what he chooses, the Order of Messiah finishes building their cathedral, and a great flood appears, drowning people who were not inside the cathedral at the time. Survivors set up camps inside the cathedral; the Order of Messiah takes control of the top floors, while the Ring of Gaea occupies the basement floors.

After this point, the story continues differently depending on the Hero's alignment.

- If it is "law", the Law Hero is killed in a battle with the Chaos Hero, while the Hero and the Heroine go to the basement. On their way they have to kill the Chaos Hero and fight Yuriko, who turns out to be the demon Lilith in disguise; she says that she and the Hero were supposed to be the new Adam and Eve and that she wanted to create a new age and live with him forever, which is why she tried to execute the Heroine. After defeating her in battle, the Hero and the Heroine reach the basement and kill the demon Asura-ou; they then go to the cathedral's roof, where they are thanked by a messenger from God.
- If the Hero's alignment instead is "chaos", he and the Heroine must go to the top floor and kill the archangel Michael, and on their way kill the Law Hero; in this scenario, Yuriko leaves the Hero and the Heroine instead of fighting them, while the Chaos Hero dies after trying to steal a magical ring from the Hero. On the roof, they meet Lucifer, who says that a new era will begin, where both demons and humans are free; he also warns them that God still is alive.
- If the Hero's alignment instead is "neutral", he and the Heroine must kill the Law Hero, the Chaos Hero, Asura-ou, and Michael, and fight Yuriko. On the roof, they meet Taishang Laojun, who thanks them and says that balance is needed to achieve happiness; he asks the Hero and the Heroine to lead humanity to a future that doesn't rely on gods or demons.

The game ends with the Heroine saying that those who have died will be reborn, and that it is time for creation and rebuilding.

== Development ==
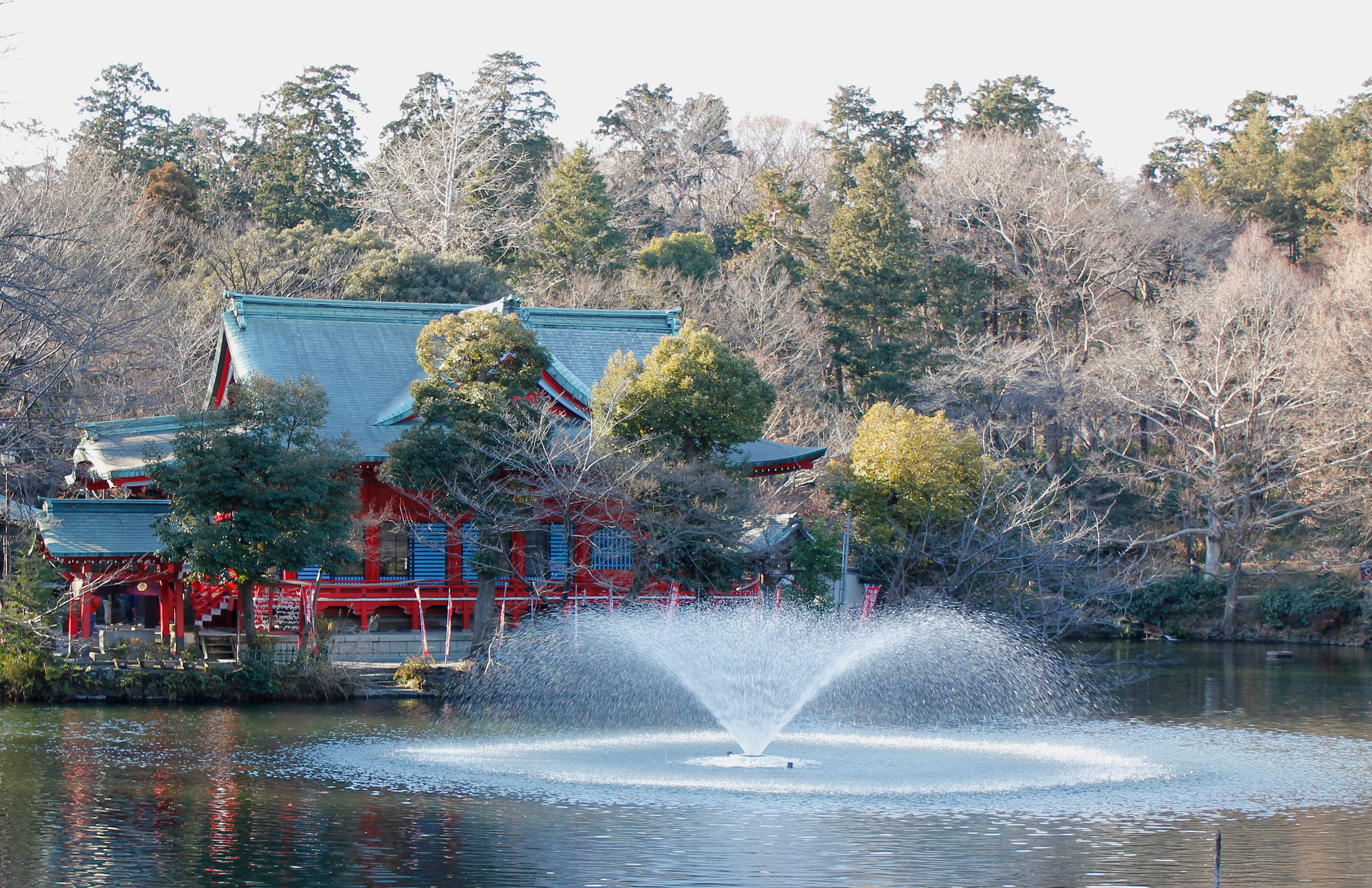
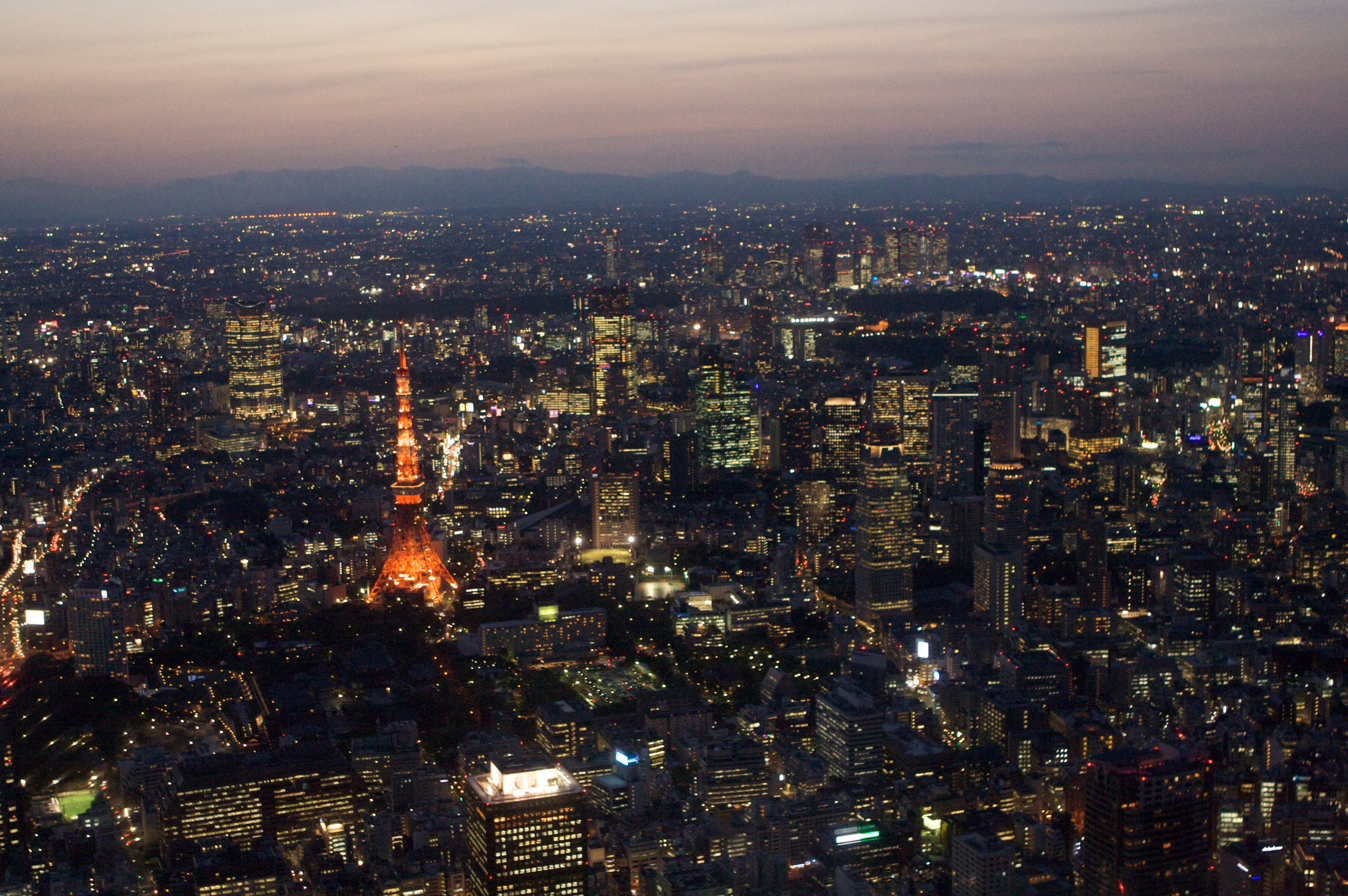
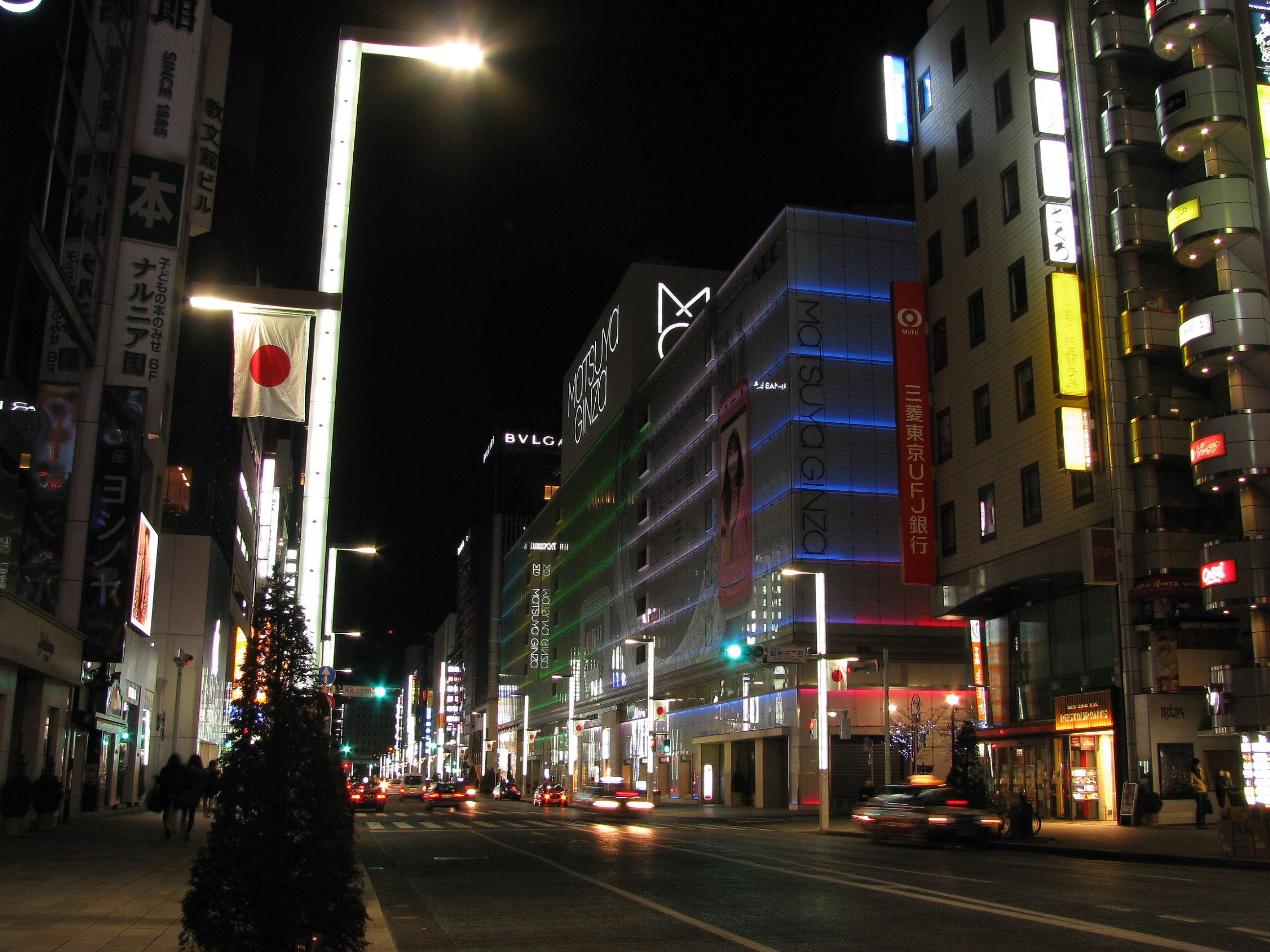
Players are able to visit several areas in Tokyo, including Inokashira Park in Kichijōji, Tokyo Tower, and Ginza.

The first two Megami Tensei titles were developed by Atlus and published by Namco as part of a media expansion for Digital Devil Story, a series of science fiction novels written by Aya Nishitani and published by Tokuma Shoten. Following this, Tokuma Shoten lost interest in the project and failed to trademark the "Megami Tensei" title, allowing Atlus to trademark it for themselves. Following this they contacted Nishitani directly for permission to create a new game project based on his work, to which Nishitani agreed; the new project became Shin Megami Tensei. From the beginning of production, Atlus staff saw Shin Megami Tensei as a chance to develop a game with the company's brand on it.

The main staff included director Yōsuke Niino, producer Hideyuki Yokoyama, programmer and future Megami Tensei director Kouji Okada, writers Ryutaro Ito and Kazunari Suzuki, and composer Tsukasa Masuko. Kazuma Kaneko worked on multiple aspects of the game, including character and sprite design, the world's concept and visual design, and the creation of visual assets. Atlus saw the game as a remake of the previous game in the Megami Tensei series, Digital Devil Story: Megami Tensei II. As such, the staff knew what would happen with the story, so development went smoothly. An early factor in the game was the inclusion of a Law Hero and a Chaos Hero, and a protagonist who would initially be neutral and whose actions would affect their alignment. Kaneko defined this blending of different alignments as "a sort of hodgepodge" when compared to future games in the series. When designing it, the team slowly decided that they wanted to break the then-current gaming status quo using its aesthetic and content. That feeling, along with granting it a sense of reality through use of dark imagery, would later define the series. The main theme of Shin Megami Tensei was a person waking up to inevitable destruction and being able to do nothing but rely on their own abilities. The scenario took a long time to finalize, being revised a number of times by multiple staff members. During earlier drafts, it was planned that the finale of the story would take place in Israel after an extensive journey across Japan.

One of the reasons the development team chose Tokyo as the main setting was that its turbulent history, going through multiple phases of development and often suffering severe damage in wars or due to natural disasters, made it comparable with the fantasy settings of other games at the time. In a later interview, an Atlus staff member stated that this setting and style made it the antithesis of traditional fantasy RPGs, adding that this resulted in the game developing a punk spirit. Because of the post-apocalyptic setting of Megami Tensei II, the development team wanted to depict a time before the apocalypse. The decision to set the game in Tokyo was made by Suzuki and Kaneko, and was influenced by manga such as Violence Jack, Devilman, and Fist of the North Star. Kichijōji was decided to be the game's starting point due to Kaneko, Suzuki, and Ito all having lived in or near the area, or having visited it often. The abandoned Terminal Echo building there fascinated them, making them wonder how a building in such a prime location could remain unoccupied; Ito described it as two floors of arcade cabinets, with the rest of the building feeling like a ghost town. This fascination led to it being included as a dungeon in the game. While designing the maps, Kaneko wanted to use wire-frame models, but the Super Famicom's limited capacities meant this idea was scrapped.

By the end of development, multiple members of staff voiced dissatisfaction with the final product. Ito and Suzuki felt that the portrayals of the Law and Chaos Heroes were imbalanced, with the Chaos Hero being too emotional and the Law Hero being unsympathetic. They also saw the demon fusion system as too difficult for players to master. Okada, while commenting on what improvements would be made for the next game, stated that there were too many useless items in the game. Niino felt that the game's pacing and flow needed to be addressed, as after naming the characters, the player immediately is prompted to divide their status points.

=== Character designs ===
In addition to handling the graphics, Kaneko designed the character and demon designs for the game. The Hero's and the Heroine's clothes were designed to be futuristic; the Heroine was designed to be a protector, with clothes inspired by American football equipment. The Law Hero and Chaos Hero have ordinary clothes at first; the Chaos Hero was designed to look unsophisticated, with a bad posture and military clothes. After their metamorphoses, the Law Hero wears clothes designed to look priestly; Kaneko did not have a specific form in mind when designing them, but thought they looked "Gucci-like". The Chaos Hero's clothes after his metamorphosis were designed to be similar to the character Piccolo from the Dragon Ball manga series; his hair style was also based on Dragon Ball, specifically on that of the "super saiyan" transformations in that series. Kaneko wanted the Chaos Hero to change back and forth between human and demon form to tie in more closely with this design theme, but the concept was abandoned. During production, all the characters had names attached to them to help with identification during event planning. The character Louis Cyphre was inspired by the character of the same name from the 1987 movie Angel Heart. Some characters, such as Stephen and General Gotou, are based on real-life people; in the game files, they are identified as "hoking" and "mishima", respectively. According to Ito, the character Thorman's name was originally inspired by the Norse god of thunder, but after release, he realized that the name was highly similar to that of Harry S. Truman, the American president who approved the atomic attacks against Japan.

For the demon design, Kaneko took inspiration from Medieval woodblock prints, wooden carvings from South America, masks from Micronesia, and terracotta figurines from the Middle East. His designs of angelic characters were influenced by descriptions from the Book of Ezekiel of angels having multiple strange forms, such as multiple arms or heads. In addition to traditional demons and monsters, Kaneko designed versions of less-frequented figures from Celtic and Southeast Asian mythology. The theme he used when drawing them was "fear", which extended to both obvious threats and the internal dread the creatures evoked. The graphics for most demons were directly drawn as sprites, without concept art, to make sure that the design and the graphics would work within the hardware limitations of the Super Famicom. Certain important characters, and some demons who the player would be guaranteed to meet, were drawn as concept art first. Several demons were designed in a way that allowed parts of their graphics to be reused; for instance, the demon Cerberus' body is also used for Shanhui and Nue, with a different color palette. Demon fusions were designed around the dichotomy of Law and Chaos, but in hindsight it was stated that this provided little fusion variety.

=== Music ===
The game's music was composed by Tsukasa Masuko, with arrangements by Masuko and Tatsuya Nishiwaki. Masuko considered Shin Megami Tensei to be an experimental work: it was the first time he had created music for the Super Famicom, so he was not familiar with the console's specifications. During composition, he needed to check the specifications repeatedly to see what he could do within the hardware limitations. For the PC Engine port, the music was arranged by Hitoshi Sakimoto.

A soundtrack album, Shin Megami Tensei Law & Chaos Disc, was released on February 24, 1993, by Victor Entertainment under the catalog number VICL-40046/7. It includes two discs: the first contains the music as it sounds in-game, and the second contains arrangements by Nishiwaki. A second album, Shin Megami Tensei Sound Collection, was released on March 5, 2003, by SME Visual Works under the catalog number SVWC-7175/6. It includes music from the original and PlayStation versions of Shin Megami Tensei, Shin Megami Tensei II, and Shin Megami Tensei If..., along with selected tracks from Shin Megami Tensei: Nine.

== Release ==
Shin Megami Tensei was first released on the Super Famicom on October 30, 1992, in Japan; it remained exclusive to that region for 22 years. It was the first Megami Tensei title not to be published by Namco. Instead, it was published by Atlus, which caused some complaints as to why Namco was not publishing the game. A fan translation of the Super Famicom version has been developed. Subsequent ports were released on the PC Engine (December 25, 1993), Mega-CD (February 25, 1994), the PlayStation (May 31, 2001), and Game Boy Advance (March 28, 2003). Atlus was responsible for the PlayStation port, and the staff were divided on whether to make it a complete port or something new. Those who wanted a direct port won through. The PC Engine port included added story scenes. SIMS Co., Ltd. was in charge of the Mega CD port, which included additional demons. The Game Boy Advance version, which was the first time Shin Megami Tensei appeared on a portable platform, included the ability to exchange demons and items using the platform's data exchange capacities. It also featured remastered music and alterations to ease the playing experience. The game was released in February 2012 for iOS and November of that year for Android. These mobile ports were based on the Game Boy Advance version, including all the port's features. The iOS port was localized and released in North America and Europe on March 18, 2014. With the release of iOS 11 in 2017, the game is no longer compatible with up-to-date iOS devices.

=== Localization ===
Shin Megami Tensei, as with many other early Megami Tensei titles, was initially not localized for the West, likely due to its controversial content such as the portrayal of religious elements, which would have clashed with Nintendo's strict content policy guidelines. The possibility of a later localization after the series became established in the West was stalled due to the age of the game, which would have put it at a disadvantage in the modern gaming market.

In 2002, the team Aeon Genesis released an English translation patch unofficially for the original Super Famicom release of the game. They went on to release English translations for Shin Megami Tensei II in 2004 and Shin Megami Tensei if... in 2018. In 2021, another team released a translation patch for the GBA version that carries over the official iOS localization. In 2022, a third team released an unofficial English translation patch for the PlayStation release.

According to Nich Maragos, the editor of the English version of Shin Megami Tensei, it was already too late to localize the PlayStation and Game Boy Advance versions of the game by the time the Megami Tensei series had "taken off" in the US; Atlus normally does not have an interest in localizing mobile games, but saw the iOS version of the game as a perfect opportunity to fill in one of the gaps in the series. The localization project was slow at first, as it took time to extract the files from the game, so the localization team started by playing the game in order to find out what kinds of dialogue text and system messages it contained. After receiving the files, they translated the text, which was then sent to the editors; the edited text was sent back to the translators, who checked that nothing had been lost in translation, after which the text was inserted into the game. A challenge for the localization team was character limitations: only four rows of text, with 28 characters each, were able to be displayed at a time, and at some points this had to be limited even further in order to avoid graphical glitches. This was solved by modifying the game to allow for more text boxes as needed. Later Megami Tensei games, which had been localized before Shin Megami Tensei, influenced the localization, as several of them include terms or quotes from the game. For instance, the catastrophe in Shin Megami Tensei is referred to as the "Great Cataclysm" in Devil Summoner: Raidou Kuzunoha vs. The Soulless Army, while Persona 4 and Shin Megami Tensei IV include several quotes and terms from the game. The already translated Shin Megami Tensei quotes from Persona 4's localization were reused verbatim in the localization of Shin Megami Tensei.

== Reception ==
Reception

Aggregate score
Aggregator	Score
Metacritic	iOS: 72/100

Review scores
Publication	Score
Famitsu	(SFC): 9/10, 9/10, 9/10, 9/10 (PCE): 7/10, 7/10, 6/10, 5/10 (MCD): 8/10, 7/10, 7/10, 6/10 (PS): 30/40 (GBA): 27/40
Gamezebo	iOS: 4/5
Pocket Gamer	iOS: 8/10
RPGFan	SFC: 81% iOS: 80%
TouchArcade	iOS: 4.5/5
The Super Famicom	82/100

According to Ito, the Super Famicom release was a great success for the company, helping establishing it as both a developer and publisher. While a success, the game also received criticism from players for its high encounter rate and difficulties using the map and in-game instructions. At the end of 2001, the PlayStation version was the 119th best selling video game of the year in Japan, with 85,991 sold copies.

On release, the four reviewers in Famitsu magazine each gave the original Super Famicom version a score of 9/10. While one reviewer said the presentation has been improved from previous installments, another said the graphics were a bit weak. Two reviewers commented on the atmosphere of the game with one comparing to the manga series Devilman and another saying that as a long-time fan of the series, they were happy that the mood, gameplay and the remained exactly the same as the first title. One writer said that more RPGs have grown dull with just fighting enemies to level up and was thankful that this game was different with the ability to talk, recruit and fuse the demon enemies. Along with Dragon Quest V and World of Illusion Starring Mickey Mouse and Donald Duck, Shin Megami Tensei received the highest scores from the magazine in 1992. By 1992, it was one of only eleven games to have received an average Famitsu score of 36/40 or above since the magazine's debut in 1986.

Reviewing the compact disc-based port for the PC Engine, the reviewers in Famitsu complimented the small additions of voice acting and sound quality improvement but lamented the load time of the CD. Reviewer Hirokazu Hamamura said that battles were especially a problem as they sometimes had over 20 seconds of loading time. For the Mega CD version, two reviewers in Famitsu felt the new graphic style, from an anime-style to a more realistic one was better. Two others complimented on changes to the overworld map now being 2D and with placenames as a positive change from the original. Two reviewers felt that the game was slower with controls being a bit more sluggish.

The website TouchArcade said that they loved the game, and that it was one of their favorite role-playing games on iOS. They did however think that the game was bad at explaining things, including the system of saving one's progress. Pocket Gamer, too, thought that things were not explained enough. For instance, they said that the game does not guide players from point A to point B, and often does not even let players know where to start looking for point B. RPGFan echoed this, and said that it is not uncommon for players to wander around, wondering where to go. Gamezebo said they did not think the battle system was particularly exciting, but appreciated how the conversation system and the demon fusion adds elements of risk and reward to the game. Gamezebo found the iOS version's touch screen-based virtual buttons clumsy to use, while Pocket Gamer found the interface to work "reasonably well" while using the landscape mode, and RPGFan found the interface to be excellent. Both Gamezebo and TouchArcade wished the game had been a "universal app", so that it could have been played on other devices than iPhone and iPod Touch without having the graphics upscaled.

Several reviewers appreciated the game's plot. Gamezebo said that it was an aspect of the game that stood out in a positive way, and pointed out how good they thought the English translation was. TouchArcade called the story one of the game's strengths, and said that it was impressive, despite how it had a tendency to be "ham-fisted". RPGFan found the story to be good and macabre, and surprisingly relevant even in 2014. They disliked that there was very little character development, and how scenes that "traditionally [would] be poignant", especially death scenes, were handled in a nonchalant manner.

TouchArcade called the graphics "good, but not great", though reasonable given the game's age, but that some demon designs were "spectacular works of art". RPGFan found the majority of the game's graphics to be "functional, but not too appealing", and said that it was easy to get lost due to the bland textures of the walls and the floors. They did however like the graphics used in battles and story sections, which they found well-drawn and detailed. They praised the designs of the game's female characters, especially Nekomata, Lamia, and Yuriko, but felt that the designs of the male characters were bland. TouchArcade found the music to be fantastic. RPGFan said that every piece fits into the scene where it is played, but that few were memorable. They did note "Ginza" as an exception, which they felt was so well-composed that it would sound good in any format.

== Legacy ==
The success of Shin Megami Tensei led to multiple sequels over the coming years and made the Megami Tensei franchise more popular. Development on a sequel began immediately after the success of Shin Megami Tensei. Shin Megami Tensei II, which directly continued the story of Shin Megami Tensei, was released in 1994. Multiple other Shin Megami Tensei titles have followed and brought the series acclaim overseas. Kaneko's concept of the Chaos Hero's transformation was resurrected as the main gameplay mechanic of Shin Megami Tensei: Digital Devil Saga.

The game developer Toby Fox cited Shin Megami Tensei as inspiration for his 2015 game Undertale, specifically its dialogue system.
