= List of Megami Tensei media =

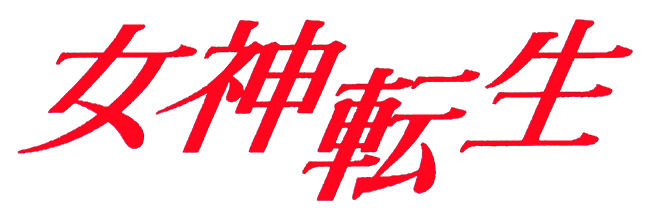
Top: Japanese series logo
Bottom: Shin Megami Tensei logo used in several international releases

Megami Tensei is a media franchise consisting mainly of role-playing video games primarily developed and published by Atlus. It began in 1986 with the Digital Devil Story novel trilogy, shortly followed in 1987 by a film adaptation and the game Digital Devil Story: Megami Tensei, which had two versions, one by Telenet Japan for home computers and one by Namco for the Famicom, the latter of which has since spawned several spin-offs and sub-series, such as Shin Megami Tensei, Persona and Devil Summoner. In addition to the console and computer releases, there are Megami Tensei mobile games, several of which are developed by Menue. (Note: Menue was known as Bbmf Corporation until 2010.) The series also includes additional media, such as anime series and films, manga, and a live-action television series, and has seen several music album releases.

The series has several recurring themes, including demon-summoning, Japanese folklore, and the occult. Despite its thematic roots in Japanese culture and mythology, it has found a cult following internationally.

== Video games ==
- Megami Tensei sub-series: Digital Devil Story: Megami Tensei; Shin Megami Tensei; Last Bible; Majin Tensei; Devil Summoner; Persona; Devil Children; Digital Devil Saga; Devil Survivor

The Megami Tensei video game series began with the 1987 game Digital Devil Story: Megami Tensei, which was published by Namco for the home video game console Famicom, and was based on Aya Nishitani's Digital Devil Story novel trilogy. It received a sequel in 1990, after which a number of sub-series were created; the Shin Megami Tensei sub-series, along with the original Digital Devil Story: Megami Tensei titles, form the core of the Megami Tensei series, while others, such as the Devil Summoner and Persona series, as well as the Fire Emblem crossover Tokyo Mirage Sessions #FE, are spin-offs. Some spin-offs belong to other genres than role-playing, such as the fighting game Persona 4 Arena, the action game Jack Bros., and the strategy game Majin Tensei. Most entries in the series are unrelated to one another, but carry over common thematic elements and gameplay mechanics, such as a contemporary urban setting, occult themes, demon-summoning and recruitment, and the ability to fuse two or more demons together to create more powerful demons.

Most of the games are developed by Atlus, but other companies have also been involved, including Multimedia Intelligence Transfer, Lancarse, CAVE, Nex Entertainment, and Arc System Works. Atlus has also worked with Menue on multiple mobile spin-off games, including ones based on Persona and Devil Summoner.

== Film and television ==
Game	Details
Digital Devil Story: Megami Tensei March 25, 1987 – Original video animation	Notes: Directed by Mizuho Nishikubo; First animated adaptation of the Megami Tensei series.; Character designs were provided by Hiroyuki Kitazume
Tokyo Revelation April 21, 1995 – Original video animation	Notes: Directed by Osamu Yamasaki; Known in Japan as Shin Megami Tensei: Tokyo Mokushiroku
Shin Megami Tensei: Devil Summoner 1997–1998 – Live-action television series	Notes: Aired for two seasons, the first being an adaptation of the Devil Summoner game and the second an original story; Given the subtitle Bright Demon Advent in the VHS release
Shin Megami Tensei: DeviChil 2000–2001 – Anime television series	Notes: Produced at TMS Entertainment
Shin Megami Tensei: D-Children – Light & Dark 2002–2003 – Anime television series	Notes: Produced at two companies: Actas for the first half of the series, and Studio Comet for the second
Persona: Trinity Soul 2008 – Anime television series	Notes: Set ten years after the events of the game Persona 3; Produced at Aniplex and directed by Atsushi Matsumoto
Persona 4: The Animation 2011–2012 – Anime television series	Notes: An adaptation of the game Persona 4; Produced at Anime International Company and directed by Seiji Kishi; Was compiled into the 90-minute film Persona 4 The Animation: The Factor of Hope, with some new footage added, and released on June 9, 2012
Devil Survivor 2: The Animation 2013 – Anime television series	Notes: An adaptation of the game Devil Survivor 2; Produced at Bridge and directed by Seiji Kishi
Persona 3 The Movie: #1 Spring of Birth November 23, 2013 – Anime film	Notes: The first entry in a film series adaptation of the game Persona 3; Produced at Anime International Company and directed by Noriaki Akitaya
Persona 3 The Movie: #2 Midsummer Knight's Dream June 7, 2014 – Anime film	Notes: Produced at A-1 Pictures and directed by Tomomi Ishikawa
Persona 4: The Golden Animation 2014 – Anime television series	Notes: An adaptation of the game Persona 4 Golden; Produced at A-1 Pictures and directed by Tomohisa Taguchi
Persona 3 The Movie: #3 Falling Down April 4, 2015 – Anime film	Notes: Produced at A-1 Pictures and directed by Keitaro Motonaga
Persona 3 The Movie: #4 Winter of Rebirth January 23, 2016 – Anime film	Notes: Produced at A-1 Pictures and directed by Tomohisa Taguchi
Persona 5: The Animation – The Day Breakers September 3, 2016 – Anime television special	Notes: Produced at A-1 Pictures and directed by Takaharu Ozaki
Persona 5: The Animation 2018 – Anime television series	Notes: Produced at A-1 Pictures and directed by Masashi Ishihama

== Manga ==
Title	Writer	Artist	Publisher	Release	Ref.
Shin Megami Tensei: Tokyo Revelation	Kazunari Suzuki	Chiaki Ogishima	ASCII Corporation	1993–1996	
Shin Megami Tensei II: Tokyo Millennium	(Unknown)	(Unknown)	ASCII Corporation	1994	
Shin Megami Tensei I·II Comic	(Unknown)	(Unknown)	Futabasha	1995	
Majin Tensei: The True Remembrance	Shinshū Ueda	Shinshū Ueda	Enix	1995–1996	
Shin Megami Tensei If... Gakuen no Akuma Tsukai	Kazuaki Yanagisawa	Kazuaki Yanagisawa	ASCII Corporation	1996	
Shin Megami Tensei: Kahn	Kazuaki Yanagisawa	Kazuaki Yanagisawa	ASCII Corporation, Enterbrain	1996–2002	
Megami Ibunroku Persona: Be Your True Mind	Shinshū Ueda	Shinshū Ueda	Enix	1997–2000	
Devil Summoner: Soul Hackers	Shouko Tsutsumi	Shouko Tsutsumi	Enix	1998–1999	
Shin Megami Tensei CG Senki: Dante no Mon	Osamu Makino	Natsuo Anetsu	ASCII Corporation	1999–2000	
Persona 2: Tsumi: 4Koma Gag Battle	(Unknown)	(Unknown)	Kobunsha	1999–2000	
Shin Megami Tensei: Comic Anthology	(Anthology featuring several writers)	(Anthology featuring several artists)	Kobunsha	2001	
Persona: Tsumi to Batsu	Naotsugu Matsueda	Naotsugu Matsueda	Shueisha	2000–2001	
Plastic Babies: Megami Ibunroku Persona & Persona 2: Tsumi	Beruno Mikawa	Beruno Mikawa	Kobunsha	2000–2011	
Shin Megami Tensei: 4Koma Gag Battle	(Unknown)	(Unknown)	Kobunsha	2001	
Shin Megami Tensei: Devil Children: 4Koma Gag Battle	(Unknown)	(Unknown)	Kobunsha	2001	
Shin Megami Tensei: Devil Children	Fujii Hideaki	Fujii Hideaki	Kodansha	2001–2002	
Megaten All-Stars Devils Arc	(Unknown)	(Unknown)	Kobunsha	2002	
Shin Megami Tensei: D-Children: Light & Dark	Fujii Hideaki	Fujii Hideaki	Kodansha	2003–2004	
Shin Megami Tensei: Eden	Mutsuki Amatatsu	Mutsuki Amatatsu	Kadokawa Shoten	2003	
Shin Megami Tensei III: Nocturne	(Unknown)	(Unknown)	Enix	2003	
Shin Megami Tensei: Nine: Anthology Comic	(Anthology featuring several writers)	(Anthology featuring several artists)	Enterbrain	2003	
Shin Megami Tensei III: Nocturne: Anthology Comic	(Anthology featuring several writers)	(Anthology featuring several artists)	Enterbrain	2003	
Shin Megami Tensei III: Nocturne: 4Koma Manga Gekishō	(Unknown)	(Unknown)	Square Enix	2003	
Shin Megami Tensei Gaiten: Hato no Senki	Shinshū Ueda	Shinshū Ueda	Square Enix	2003–2006	
Digital Devil Saga: Avatar Tuner: Shinen no Matou	Moheji Yamasaki	Moheji Yamasaki	Jive	2005	
Persona 3: Anthology Comic	(Anthology featuring several writers)	(Anthology featuring several artists)	Enterbrain	2006–2007	
Persona 3	Shuji Sogabe	Shuji Sogabe	Kadokawa Shoten	2007–	
Persona 4	Shuji Sogabe	Shuji Sogabe	Kadokawa Shoten	2008–	
Persona 4 Anthology Comic	(Anthology featuring several writers)	(Anthology featuring several artists)	Enterbrain	2008–2009	
Persona: Trinity Soul: Anthology Comic	(Anthology featuring several writers)	(Anthology featuring several artists)	Enterbrain	2008	
Devil Summoner: Kuzunoha Raidou tai Kodoku-no-Marebito	Taiyō Makabe, Anjū Harada	Kirihito Ayamura	Enterbrain	2010–2012	
Devil Survivor	Satoru Matsuba	Satoru Matsuba	Kodansha	2012	
Persona 4: The Magician	Shiichi Kugure	Shiichi Kugure	ASCII Corporation	2012	
Devil Survivor 2: Show Your Free Will	Atlus	Nagako Sakaki	Earth Star Entertainment	2012	
Devil Survivor 2: The Animation	Haruto Shiota	Makoto Uezu	Square Enix	2012–2014	
Tartarus Gekijō: Persona 4 & Persona 3 & Persona 3 Portable	Ryo Yasohachi	Ryo Yasohachi	Kadokawa Shoten	2012–2016	
Persona 4: The Ultimate in Mayonaka Arena: Comic Anthology	(Anthology featuring several writers)	(Anthology featuring several artists)	Ichijinsha	2012–2013	
Shin Megami Tensei IV: Dengeki Comic Anthology	Atlus	(Anthology featuring several artists)	ASCII Corporation	2013	
Persona 4: The Ultimate in Mayonaka Arena	Aiya Kyu	Aiya Kyu	ASCII Corporation	2013–2014	
Persona X Detective Naoto	Natsuki Mamiya	Satoshi Shiki	ASCII Corporation	2013–2014	
Shin Megami Tensei IV: Demonic Gene	Ikumi Fukuda	Ikumi Fukuda	Shueisha	2014	
Shin Megami Tensei IV: Prayers	Masataka Miura	Masataka Miura	Shueisha	2014	
Persona Q: Shadow of the Labyrinth: Comic Anthology	(Unknown)	(Unknown)	Ichijinsha	2014–2015	
Persona Q: Shadow of the Labyrinth – Side: P3	Sō Tobita	Sō Tobita	Kodansha	2015	
Persona Q: Shadow of the Labyrinth – Side: P4	Mizunomoto	Mizunomoto	Kodansha	2015–2017	
Persona Q: Shadow of the Labyrinth: Roundabout	Akaume	Akaume	ASCII Corporation	2015	
P4U2: Persona 4 the Ultimax Ultra Suplex Hold	Rokuro Saito	Rokuro Saito	Kadokawa Corporation	2015–2018	
Persona 5	Hisato Murasaki	Hisato Murasaki	Shogakukan	2016–	
Persona 5 Dengeki Comic Anthology	(Anthology featuring several writers)	(Anthology featuring several artists)	Kadokawa Shoten	2017	
Persona 5 Comic à la Carte	(Anthology featuring several writers)	(Anthology featuring several artists)	Kadokawa Shoten	2017	
Shin Megami Tensei DSJ Another Report	Yasuo Kanō	Yasuo Kanō	Akita Shoten	2018–	
Persona 5: Mementos Mission	Rokuro Saito	Rokuro Saito	Kadokawa Corporation	2018–	

== Music albums ==
Title	Release date	Length	Label	Ref.
Telnet Game Music Collection Vol. 1 (Note: Contains music from several game series, including Megami Tensei)	August 1, 1988	66:46	King Records	
Megami Tensei I & II	December 16, 1991	105:32	Victor Entertainment	
Majin Tensei Excellence Sound Collection	March 18, 1994	48:45	Pony Canyon	
Megaten World: Goddess World (Note: Contains music from Shin Megami Tensei I and II, Last Bible I and II, and Majin Tensei)	April 11, 1994	46:31	Pony Canyon	
Shin Megami Tensei II Sound Relation	June 17, 1994	106:41	Pony Canyon	
Majin Tensei II Spiral Nemesis Excellence Sound Collection	May 19, 1995	76:42	Pony Canyon	
Shin Megami Tensei Devil Summoner Sound File	June 1, 1996	109:32	PolyGram	
Shin Megami Tensei Devil Summoner Special Box Premium Music CD	September 8, 1996	18:03	Atlus	
Devil Summoner Soul Hackers Original Soundtrack	April 24, 1998	135:23	King Records	
Devil Summoner Soul Hackers Hyper Rearrange	May 22, 1998	59:53	King Records	
Megami Ibunroku Persona Original Soundtrack & Arrange Album	April 18, 1999	195:09	First Smile Entertainment	
Persona Be Your True Mind Original Soundtrack	June 17, 1999	189:01	Atlus	
Persona 2 Innocent Sin Original Soundtrack	June 17, 1999	142:38	King Records	
Persona 2: Innocent Sin: The Errors of Their Youth	March 24, 2000	58:24	King Records	
Persona 2 Eternal Punishment Original Soundtrack	June 26, 2000	126:59	King Records	
Persona 2 Eternal Punishment – Punitive Dance	November 30, 2000	55:53	Enterbrain	
Shin Megami Tensei Devil Children Perfect Soundtracks	December 20, 2000	55:54	First Smile Entertainment	
Shin Megami Tensei Devil Children Arrange Tracks	February 21, 2001	39:45	First Smile Entertainment	
Shin Megami Tensei Nine Premium Soundtrack	December 5, 2002	60:50	Atlus	
Shin Megami Tensei III Nocturne Deluxe Pack Insence Disc	February 20, 2003	18:28	Atlus	
Shin Megami Tensei Law & Order	February 24, 2003	76:45	Victor Entertainment	
Shin Megami Tensei Sound Collection	March 5, 2003	122:24	SME Visual Works	
Shin Megami Tensei III Nocturne Original Soundtrack	March 5, 2003	113:53	SME Visual Works	
Shin Megami Tensei III Nocturne Maniacs Soundtrack Extra Version	February 4, 2004	39:04	Aniplex	
Digital Devil Saga Avatar Tuner Sera Premium Soundtrack	July 15, 2004	15:22	Atlus	
Digital Devil Saga Avatar Tuner Soundtrack CD	September 24, 2004	74:10	Frontier Works	
Shin Megami Tensei Nocturne Original Soundtrack	October 12, 2004	71:18	Atlus	
Shin Megami Tensei Digital Devil Saga Original Soundtrack	April 5, 2005	72:03	Atlus	
Shin Megami Tensei Digital Devil Saga 2 Original Soundtrack	October 4, 2005	77:48	Atlus	
Digital Devil Saga Avatar Tuner 1 & 2 Original Soundtrack Integral	December 22, 2005	244:37	Five Records	
Devil Summoner Raidou Kuzunoha VS The Army of Ultimate Power Complete Music	April 2, 2006	73:26	Five Records	
Devil Summoner Sound Collection Hyper Rearrange Collection	May 2, 2006	24:56	Atlus	
Persona 3 Original Soundtrack	July 19, 2006	131:47	Aniplex	
Digital Devil Saga Avatar Tuner 2 Mini Soundtrack	January 27, 2007	15:22	Atlus	
Megami Tensei Online Imagine Original Soundtrack	March 30, 2007	54:44	Atlus	
Burn My Dread: Reincarnation: Persona 3	April 18, 2007	61:30	Aniplex	
Persona 3 Fes Original Soundtrack	May 2, 2007	57:04	Aniplex	
Shin Megami Tensei Persona 3 Original Soundtrack	August 14, 2007	55:44	Atlus	
Persona Trinity Soul Original Soundtrack	July 2, 2008	126:37	Aniplex	
Persona 4 Original Soundtrack	July 23, 2008	128:56	Aniplex	
Persona – Another Memory	October 21, 2008	12:34	Atlus	
Devil Summoner Raidou Kuzunoha VS King Abaddon Soundtrack	October 23, 2008	48:29	Atlus	
Shin Megami Tensei: Persona 4 Soundtrack Side A	December 9, 2008	65:05	Atlus	
Shin Megami Tensei: Persona 4 Soundtrack Side B	December 9, 2008	63:20	Atlus	
Persona Premium Box	December 24, 2008	379:06	Aniplex	
Megami Ibunroku Devil Survivor Original Remix Soundtrack	January 11, 2009	51:08	Lantis	
Shin Megami Tensei: Persona 4 Soundtrack Selection	March 13, 2009	65:05	Square Enix	
Persona Original Soundtrack (Note: Contains music from the PlayStation Portable version of the game)	April 29, 2009	97:20	Atlus	
Persona Music Live: Velvetroom in Akasaka Blitz (Note: Contains live concert footage with music from Persona 3, Persona 4, and Persona: Trinity Soul)	September 16, 2009	110:00	Aniplex	
Shin Megami Tensei: Strange Journey Original Soundtrack	November 18, 2009	64:51	Columbia Music Entertainment	
Persona 3 Portable Original Soundtrack	November 25, 2009	25:39	Aniplex	
Shin Megami Tensei: Strange Journey Soundtrack	March 23, 2010	23:47	Atlus	
Megami Tensei Gaiden: Last Bible Soundtrack	September 15, 2010	24:35	Sweep Records	
Megami Tensei Gaiden: Last Bible II Soundtrack	October 7, 2010	26:33	Sweep Records	
Persona 3 Portable Voice Mix Arrange	December 15, 2010	57:31	Team Entertainment	
Another Bible Soundtrack	January 19, 2011	16:30	Sweep Records	
Persona 2: Innocent Sin Mini Soundtrack	April 14, 2011	24:48	Atlus	
Persona 2: Innocent Sin Original Soundtrack (Note: Contains music from the PlayStation Portable version of the game)	April 27, 2011	437:48	King Records	
Devil Survivor 2 Special Soundtrack	July 28, 2011	29:10	Atlus	
Devil Survivor 2 Original Soundtrack	August 24, 2011	71:29	Frontier Works	
Last Bible III Soundtrack	October 5, 2011	118:37	Sweep Records	
Persona 4: Reincarnation: Never More	October 26, 2011	51:02	Aniplex	
Persona 2: Eternal Punishment Special Soundtrack	May 17, 2012	39:37	Atlus	
Persona 2: Eternal Punishment Original Soundtrack (Note: Contains music from the PlayStation Portable version of the game)	June 27, 2012	345:02	King Records	
Persona 4 The Golden Original Soundtrack	June 27, 2012	40:44	Aniplex	
Persona 4: The Ultimate in Mayonaka Arena Original Soundtrack	August 22, 2012	52:55	Aniplex	
Shin Megami Tensei IV Music Collection	July 16, 2013	52:55	Atlus	
Shin Megami Tensei IV Original Soundtrack	February 26, 2014	272:08	Index Corporation	
Persona Q: Shadow of the Labyrinth Original Soundtrack	July 16, 2014	154:13	Index Corporation	
Persora: The Golden Best	July 16, 2014	41:17	Mastard Records	
Persona 4: The Ultimax Ultra Suplex Hold Original Soundtrack	December 17, 2014	51:45	Mastard Records	
Persora: The Golden Best 2	February 18, 2015	38:34	Mastard Records	
Persona 4: Dancing All Night Original Soundtrack	June 25, 2015	147:28	Atlus	
Persona 4: Dancing All Night Soundtrack Advanced CD	July 29, 2015	73:12	Mastard Records	
Persona 4: Dancing All Night Soundtrack Collector's Edition	July 29, 2015	219:02	Mastard Records	
Devil Survivor 2: Break Record Original Soundtrack	July 22, 2015	91:26	Mastard Records	
Persona Super Live 2015: Night of the Phantom (Note: Contains recordings from a live concert with music from Persona 3, Persona 4, and their spin-offs)	August 26, 2015	109:30	Mastard Records	
20th Anniversary of Persona Series All Time Best Album	September 15, 2015	337:21	Atlus	
Shin Megami Tensei IV: Final Original Soundtrack	February 24, 2016	113:53	Mastard Records	
Persona 3 Meets Bass X Bass	August 24, 2016		Mastard Records	
Persona 4 Meets Bass X Bass	August 24, 2016		Mastard Records	
Persora: The Golden Best 3	October 5, 2016		Mastard Records	
Persora: The Golden Best 4	November 2, 2016		Mastard Records	
Persona 5 Original Soundtrack	January 17, 2017	226:35	Mastard Records	
Shin Megami Tensei If... Original Sound Collection	May 24, 2018		Sweep Records	
