= Pickmos =

- Developer: PocketGame
- Publisher: NetworkGo
- Release: 2027
- Genre: Monster-taming game
- Modes: Single-player, multiplayer

Pickmos is an upcoming monster-taming and survival video game developed by PocketGame and published by NetworkGo, and scheduled for release in 2027. It was originally named Pickmon before its name was changed, in what journalists called a response to accusations that it was a clone of the Pokémon series. However, it saw further backlash from fans due to its heavy resemblance to various video games, including unauthorized usage of fan-made Fakemon designs. This led to the game's publisher officially intervening in the game's development in order to address the copyright issues and "ensure a controversy-free experience".

== Reception ==
Upon the game's announcement, critics expressed surprise at the game's "shameless" copying of other IP, including Palworld, The Legend of Zelda: Breath of the Wild for its world design, music and main character, many Pickmon resembling both official and fan-made Pokémon designs, and a character similar to Roadhog from Overwatch, believing that it would only be a matter of time until the company was "sued into oblivion" for copyright infringement by the IP owners.

The game's publisher later intervened in development to address the controversy, leading to the game's removal from the Steam online storefront, though critics expressed uncertainty whether it was entirely the developer's fault or if the publisher was also at fault.
