= Pokémon Uranium =

- Director: ~JV~
- Programmer: ~JV~
- Artist: Involuntary Twitch
- Writer: Involuntary Twitch
- Series: Pokémon (unofficial)
- Engine: RPG Maker XP
- Release: August 6, 2016

Pokémon Uranium is a fan-made video game based on the Pokémon video game series. The game features gameplay similar to the main series games, though incorporates numerous Fakemon alongside existing species of Pokémon as well as an original story and setting. Developed by users ~JV~ and Involuntary Twitch, the game was made using the Pokémon Essentials fan-made add-on for the game RPG Maker XP. Pokémon Uranium was in development for nine years, with several betas being released to the public prior to the game's full release on August 6, 2016.

Due to the Pokémon franchise experiencing a rise in popularity at the time of Uranium's release, the game was downloaded 1.5 million times within its first week, becoming highly popular with the Pokémon fan community. Soon after its release, the game received a DMCA takedown request from Nintendo, one of the Pokémon franchise's parent companies, which resulted in all download links to the game being removed. Though development continued behind the scenes following the takedown, development was eventually entirely halted by September 2016, though the full postgame was finished years later on October 10, 2026.

Though initially nominated for the Game Awards under the category "Best Fan Creation", it was pulled following the game's takedown. The game developed an active community and popularity following the takedown, with fans working on unofficial updates for Uranium. The developers of Uranium later went on to develop another fan game titled Pokémon Flux.

== Gameplay and plot ==
An image of a battle in Pokémon Uranium, depicting two of the game's Fakemon battling against each other. Uranium replicates battle systems present in the main series games and features many original, fan-made creations.

The game follows a similar gameplay formula to mainline series Pokémon games. The player is tasked with defeating eight Gym Leaders scattered across the game's main setting of the Tandor region, which they fight using captured Pokémon, with the aim of becoming the strongest trainer in the region. 200 Pokémon are available to the player to catch and use on their team throughout Uranium, with 166 of them being Fakemon, which are entirely original, fan-made Pokémon. A new type of Pokémon, Nuclear Pokémon, are available in-game, and are irradiated versions of pre-existing Pokémon in the game. Several optional gameplay modes are featured, including a Nuzlocke mode, and the ability to translate Pokémon's speech to human language. Online functionalities, including the ability to battle and trade Pokémon with other players, are also available in the game.

The game's protagonist, who can be male, female, or non-binary (named Victor, Natalie, and Pluto, respectively) is the child of Pokémon Ranger Kellyn and his wife Lucille. Ten years prior to the events of the story, a nuclear power plant meltdown killed Lucille, leaving Kellyn in a deep depression. The protagonist is left in the care of their auntie and sets out on a journey through the region of Tandor. During their journey, the protagonist must deal with corrupted Nuclear Pokémon, created by the recent nuclear disaster, that threaten to destroy Tandor's ecosystem. The choices of the player also impact aspects of the story, such as their relationship with Kellyn and whether or not the protagonist is able to repair their relationship with him.

== Development ==
Pokémon Uranium was in development for nine years prior to its release and was primarily developed by two fans, who go under the names ~JV~ and Involuntary Twitch. The fan game was developed using RPG Maker XP with alterations to allow for elements of the Pokémon video game series to be used, primarily added via the fan-made software Pokémon Essentials. It was developed to have "better mechanics and a deeper story" than the main series games. Involuntary Twitch stated the initial desire to create the game stemmed from her and ~JV~ wishing to create their own Pokémon game, with the idea developing further from there.

The game had four public betas as of 2015, with the fourth releasing on January 6 of the same year. The game's first completed version was on August 6, 2016, and was released on the game's website. Uranium was released on Microsoft Windows software, with a MacOS version initially in development. It also has its own dedicated wiki.

== Reception ==
Within one week of its release, Uranium was downloaded over a million and a half times. PC Gamer attributed its popularity to the recent release of Pokémon Go, which caused a resurgence in the franchise's popularity, and the upcoming release of Pokémon Sun and Moon. Due to the timing between releases, fans looking for more Pokémon content were believed to have flocked to Uranium. The popularity of the game caused its official website to crash shortly after its release due to high traffic.

Kallie Plagge, playing the game for IGN, highlighted the game's effective emulation of mechanics in the main series despite being made by fans. CGMagazine's Bella Lara Blondeau praised the game's difficulty, tackling of complex topics, and incorporation of aspects from throughout the series, expressing disappointment at its takedown by Nintendo. Nicole Kurashige, writing in the InVisible Culture Journal, felt Uranium's focus on the relationship between the player and their father served as a response to the trope of the player's father being absent in the main series Pokémon games; Kurashige believed that by having this relationship play an active role in the story, it subverts the trope and touches on darker themes than would usually be discussed in the main series.

The game was initially nominated at the 2016 Game Awards under the category "Best Fan Creation", though it was eventually pulled from the Awards following a DMCA takedown request by Nintendo.

== Cancellation and legacy ==
Due to the popularity of the game shortly after its release, Uranium received a DMCA takedown notice from Nintendo, one of the Pokémon franchise's parent companies. On August 13, 2016, it was announced on the game's Twitter account that all download links for Uranium would be taken down due to the threat of further legal action. This followed the takedown of AM2R, a highly popular Metroid fan game, the prior week. The game's online features remained up despite the takedown, and its developers stated that they would continue to work on patches for the game's bugs despite being unable to post download links for the game. The project was eventually entirely discontinued by its developers in September of the same year, citing a lack of resources and time.

Despite the game's cancellation, download links for the game persist, and dedicated groups of fans still work to update the game's code and add new content not present in the original game. In the years following the game's release, it is still considered one of the most popular fan games in the Pokémon community. The developers of Uranium would later go on to develop another fan game titled Pokémon Flux.

== See also ==
- Pokémon fan games
- Pokémon Prism, another Pokémon fan game taken down due to legal action from Nintendo
