= Pokémon Prism =

- Developer: Koolboyman
- Publisher: Koolboyman
- Series: Pokémon (unofficial)
- Platform: Game Boy Color
- Release: 2016
- Mode: Single-player

Pokémon Prism is a fanmade video game based on the Pokémon series. A ROM hack of Pokémon Crystal (2000), it was developed by Adam Vierra, also known by his online pseudonym "Koolboyman", alongside a team of numerous developers. The game is a sequel to his prior hack, Pokémon Brown (2004), and centers on the child of Lance, a boss of Pokémon Gold and Silver (1999), as the protagonist. The premise follows the protagonist as they find themselves in the region of Naljo after an earthquake and attempt to defeat Naljo's Pokémon League.

The ROM hack had been in development for eight years and was planned to be released on December 25, 2016. The game met with high popularity shortly following a trailer that announced this release date. However, the game received a cease and desist request from Nintendo, one of the Pokémon franchise's parent companies, which barred Vierra from being able to release the game. The game was later leaked and released onto the internet, allowing others to play the game and causing a resurgence in popularity.

== Gameplay and premise ==
Pokémon Prism is based visually and mechanically on Pokémon Crystal. However, it also incorporates custom mechanics, such as the ability to play as a Pokémon in the overworld (seen above).

Pokémon Prism plays similarly to the main series Pokémon games, in particular Pokémon Crystal (2000) with improved performance. The game features 252 Pokémon species, which hail from the first four generations of the franchise, and incorporates numerous gameplay mechanics introduced in later games in the series, such as Pokémon X and Y (2013). It also introduces multiple fanmade "types" of Pokémon not present in the main series, such as Gas, Abnormal, and Sound types. The game features multiple segments where the player must play as a Pokémon, including their first Pokémon, Larvitar, during which they can talk to other Pokémon and solve puzzles to progress through the game. Several other gameplay mechanics are included, such as various mini-games, the ability to mine and smelt ores for items and donating Pokémon the player has caught to an orphanage, which gives the player points they can use to obtain rare Pokémon. The player is able to customize the appearance of their protagonist, including their hair and clothing.

The game stars an original protagonist, who can be either male or female. The protagonist is the child of Lance, a boss of Pokémon Gold and Silver (1999), with the game featuring an original plot. Separated from their mother by an earthquake, they end up in the region of Naljo. The protagonist subsequently sets off on a quest to challenge the Pokémon League, seeking to defeat Gym Leaders and obtain their badges along the way. After beating the game, the player can explore the fan-made region of Rijon, the main setting of the ROM hack Pokémon Brown, as well as multiple locations present in the main series games.

== Development ==
Pokémon Prism is a fan-made ROM hack of the game Pokémon Crystal. The game was developed by Adam Vierra, who also goes by the internet pseudonym "Koolboyman", alongside a team known as "RainbowDevs", who helped with aspects such as coding and music. The game is designed to be more challenging than a standard main series game and is a sequel to Vierra's previous Pokémon Red ROM hack, Pokémon Brown (2004). Prism was in development for eight years, with multiple versions being released over that time, including a beta release in 2010. Its final release was initially planned for December 25, 2016.

== Reception ==
Prior to the game's release, a trailer was released announcing Prism's release date. This was met with high popularity, with the trailer being viewed 1.4 million times after its release. The game also gained attention due to appearing on the Twitch channel Twitch Plays Pokémon and receiving coverage from multiple gaming journalism outlets.

Shawn Reynolds, writing for Hardcore Gamer, positively highlighted the game, believing it to be worth playing, though he criticized many new mechanics introduced in the game, such as the new types, as well as numerous bugs that prevented mechanics from working correctly. Time Extension writer Damien McFarren praised the inclusion of sections where the player can play as a Pokémon, believing these sections to be an improvement over Pokémon Brown, which lacked these sections.

== Cancellation ==
The game received a cease and desist request from Nintendo, one of the Pokémon franchise's parent companies, on December 20, 2016, a few days prior to the game's intended release. The request barred Vierra from being able to release the game and required him to cease development entirely under threat of further legal action. He was additionally required to remove download links to Pokémon Brown, with his website, which also contained another ROM hack of his named Rijon Adventures, also being taken down. The cease and desist followed the recent takedown of a Pokémon fan game, Pokémon Uranium, earlier that year. Vierra stated he had been aware of the risks of publicizing Prism's release, but had not expected direct legal action from Nintendo. He later stated: "Trailer shouldn't have been made & I shouldn't have been such a perfectionist and finish it sooner." The takedowns of Uranium and Prism had a wide-reaching effect within the Pokémon fan community, with many fan game creators stating that it made them more cautious about the release and marketing of their own projects.

Following the cease and desist, a group of leakers obtained a version of the hack from during its development. It initially circulated on 4chan and was soon after released via Pastebin. This version removed the game's end credits to protect the game's creators, with a screen added to the end thanking them for their work. The leaked copy caused a resurgence in the game's popularity, with fans working to finish the hack and making patches and bug fixes. Other fans did Let's Plays and shared Nuzlocke runs of the game. The hackers, while speaking to Kotaku, stated that they had expected the hack to have been taken down much earlier, and were surprised by the amount of players who played the leaked version. They believed the cease and desist had an inverse effect from what Nintendo intended, believing that the cease and desist had instead brought more attention to the game and made it more popular.

== See also ==
- Pokémon fan games
- Pokémon Uranium, another Pokémon fan game taken down due to legal action from Nintendo
