= Pokémon Insurgence =

2017 video game

- Pokémon Insurgence logo
- Programmers: Wyatt Verchere (TheSuzerain); Deukhoofd
- Artists: EchoTheThird; ZeroBreaker
- Composers: MrSinger186; Pulvite
- Series: Pokémon (unofficial)
- Engine: RPG Maker XP
- Platforms: Windows, Mac OS, Android (unsupported)
- Release: 20 December 2014

Pokémon Insurgence is a fan-made video game based on Pokémon developed and published by Redditor Wyatt Verchere, known online as "TheSuzerain", along with a team of programmers, artists and composers. The game takes place in the Torren region, with a darker storyline focusing on multiple cults and the mythical Pokémon Mew. Pokémon Insurgence includes many main series mechanics including Mega Evolution, Mystery Gift and character customisation, whilst also introducing new alternate forms of Pokémon including Delta Pokémon, which have only appeared officially in the Pokémon trading card game, and armored Pokémon. Pokémon Insurgence has support for computers running Windows and Mac OS.

Gaming outlets praised the game for its mature storyline, improvement of existing features, and a higher level of difficulty not seen in the main series titles. Multiple lists ranking the best fan-made Pokémon games placed Pokémon Insurgence first.

== Gameplay and plot ==
Pokémon Insurgence takes place in the non-canon Torren region, with multiple features taken from official Pokémon games, such as optional difficulty levels, character customisation, Pokémon that follow the player, 925 Pokémon species available to catch, 200 of which have "Delta" variants (which were originally seen in the Pokémon Trading Card Game), and Mystery Gifts specific to the game through internet capability. Traditional elements from the official series are kept, such as the gym challenge, and rivals Damian and Nora. Other mechanics, such as Hidden Machines (HMs), are adapted, allowing players to use them without the requirement of taking up a Pokémon move slot. Options for either a dark or light story mode, which dials down the darker elements, are available for selection at the start of the game. The player character's gender and appearance are customisable, including later in the game. Other features and mechanics that return of main series titles include secret base customisation, new and returning Mega Evolutions, online trading, and finally, Pokémon armor, which can be applied to certain Pokémon as held items, boosting specific stats and transforming them into an armored form dependent on the specific armor that has been equipped.

The story is darker than those of the official entries in the series, with the killing of cult members by their leader. Multiple cults are introduced, each of which worship a different Legendary Pokémon, whilst partaking in varying criminal activities such as experimenting on Pokémon and causing mass floods. The player encounters Mew early on in the story, saving the player from having their memories erased.

=== Plot ===
A year in the past, the revered Augur, a Pokémon trainer responsible for stopping cult terrorism, has disappeared after leaving to search for a remaining cult. Jaern takes his place as the Second Augur. The player awakens in present day at the Cult of Darkrai base where the leader, Persephone, plans to wipe their memory. Witnessing the summoning of Darkrai and with the assistance of Mew, the player escapes. Mew gives the player a flute that will summon it when played. At the behest of Perfection leader Reukra, the player and Damian are each given a Delta Pokémon and start their journey.

Torren's five cults, (Note: Abyssal, Cult of Darkrai, Infernal, Perfection and Sky.) who each pursue different goals come into conflict with the player at various points. The player meets Nora, who is accompanied by Celebi and it is understood a prophecy predicts a trainer and mythical Pokémon will end the cults. After rescuing Damian from the Abyssal Cult, it is established he is partnered with Shaymin, extending the prophecy to potentially include him also. Upon learning of a plan by the Sky Cult, it is revealed that Jaern is their leader and crowned himself as Second Augur to put an end to the cults himself. Jaern shows the player a crystal used by the first Augur that provided him with power. After summoning Rayquaza, the crystal is destroyed by Damian. The shards of the broken crystal are found by the cult leaders, though many are then lost to an unknown force through various means.

Reukra develops a Deoxys virus that infects Damian, who is the son of Audrey, leader of the Abyssal Cult. After attempting a flood using Lugia and summoning Kyogre, Audrey is defeated. Darkrai turns against Persephone, trapping her in the Dream Realm. Entering this realm, the player encounters their father, Adam, the first Augur. Adam had sent Mew to protect them. A group originating from the Distortion World, led by Nyx, have been manipulating the cults to create chaos, with the goal of using the crystal to restore Giratina and claim their existence in the real world. With the crystal shards in their possession, the player goes after Nyx who has taken Nora as bait, defeats her and subdues Giratina. Upon defeat, Nyx retreats. Reukra becomes Champion of the Torren region and is bested by the player, after which the player becomes the Third Augur.

Continuing his work for Perfection, with the Azure Flute, Reukra travels to the void to capture Arceus, the creator of all Pokémon. Failing to catch Arceus, even with a Master Ball, Reukra admits defeat, leaving the player to capture Arceus themself. Reukra leaves the Torren region, bringing Perfection to an end, and fulfilling the prophecy.

== Development ==
Canadian Redditor and game developer Wyatt Verchere, known online under the pseudonym "TheSuzerain", began developing Pokémon Insurgence after completing his work on previous fan made Pokémon titles Pokémon Zeta and Pokémon Omicron. Verchere had enjoyed working on those titles, but felt that the large amount of content was "daunting" for new player. In an effort to continue learning and adapting, Verchere brought in assistance to create a development team for Insurgence. The team consisted of artists EchoTheThird and ZeroBreaker, music director MrSinger186, and programmer Deukhoofd. Verchere received story ideas from Redditors, eventually forming the basis of a multi-cult regime, deliberately designed to be darker than villainous teams from main series entries, such as Team Rocket. Delta Pokémon, which had not been seen in the main franchise since their appearance in the Pokémon TCG, were included in Pokémon Insurgence after being well-received, and fitting nicely with the darker story of the game. Verchere's team used RPG Maker, which allowed for development without requiring an emulator.

A demo was announced in November 2014, along with 70 preliminary screenshots. The game released as a beta on 20 December 2014. An unsupported method of playing the game on Android devices exists using the JoiPlay emulator.

== Reception ==
Screenshot of a battle in Pokémon Insurgence between a Delta Bulbasaur and a Gastly

Ryan Thompson-Bamsey of TheGamer referred to Pokémon Insurgence as "one of the most acclaimed Pokémon fan games to exist", describing it as "a breath of fresh air" and the story as "brooding and dark". On a list of the best fan-made Pokémon games, multiple writers for TheGamer included Pokémon Insurgence in the list, noting its popularity with the Pokémon community, a "riveting plot", and new designs in the form of Delta species. Time Extension's Damien McFerran said that Pokémon Insurgence demonstrated how advanced fan developers within the Pokémon community had become. In a list of the "Best Pokémon Fan Games Ever Made" compiled by Anthony Wallace of RetroDodo, Pokémon Insurgence placed third and was praised by Wallace for its mature storyline, jokingly said that the game was not Grand Theft Auto: Vice City due to the presence of cults and "Pokémon worshippers". Wallace also positively highlighted the replay value, with its multiple difficulty options. Writing for Kotaku, Patricia Hernandez praised the customisation options made available to the player, whilst also highlighting unique additions such as built-in Nuzlocke settings, Delta Pokémon and armor upgrades.

GameRant's Ryan Woodrow placed Pokémon Insurgence first on a list of the best Pokémon fan games, positing the game as "the best of the best when it comes to high-quality Pokémon fan games". Woodrow emphasised the game's "healthy dose of challenge", such as the gyms being based on themes as opposed to traditional types, multiple explorable regions, the expanded Dex and the return of Mega Evolutions, alongside Delta Pokémon. Also writing for GameRant, Eduardo Ariedo included Pokémon Insurgence in a list of the hardest Pokémon fan games to Nuzlocke, placing the game second, Ariedo noted the multiple customisable options catering specifically to players looking to Nuzlocke, including solo runs and randomisers. Phillip Martinez of Screen Rant designated Pokémon Insurgence as the "Best Unofficial Pokémon Video Game", highlighting its "engaging" and "extensive" postgame content and the use of Generation V style graphics. Writing for the University of Warwick student newspaper The Boar, Reece Goodall compared Pokémon Insurgence to developer Verchere's previous fan games Pokémon Zeta and Omicron, describing the "gripping" storylines Verchere creates, an example including the player facing a terrorist organisation that aimed to exploit Pokémon to ascend to godhood. Goodall also noted that the game was not affected by region locks, which affects official release titles. Donnie Smith, writing for Screen Rant, brought up the immorality of capturing and training Pokémon, addressing how Pokémon Insurgence takes it further by introducing clans that experiment on them, labelling the story as "dark" and "disturbing".

== See also ==
- Pokémon fan games
- Pokémon Showdown, a Pokemon fan simulator.
