= Pokémon fan games =

Video games by Pokémon fans

Pokémon is a widely popular media franchise, spurring the production of unofficial fan-made games in the Pokémon shared universe. These range from modifications of pre-existing games to larger, full-scale games. Fan-made projects have garnered a large following and strong subcommunity in the Pokémon fandom. Many projects have faced threats of legal action from Pokémon's parent companies The Pokémon Company and Nintendo, which are highly protective of the franchise's intellectual property, causing them to be voluntarily removed from official channels shortly after release and preserved via unofficial distribution between fans.

== History, purpose, and community ==
An image of a Pokémon battle in a ROM hack of the 2004 video game Pokémon FireRed. The battle is between a Duraludon and a Gigantamax Snorlax, which were introduced in the 2019 games Pokémon Sword and Shield. Hacks such as these often incorporate elements not present in the original game.

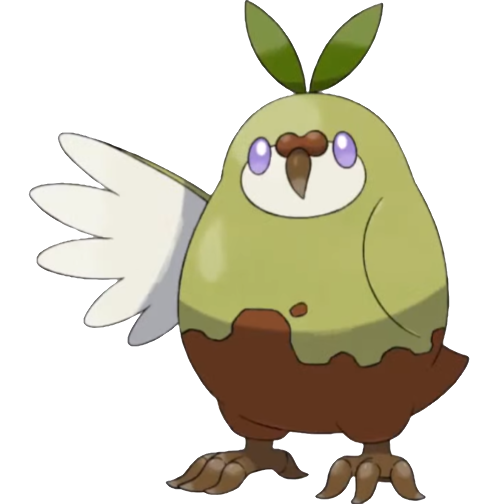
An example of a Fakemon, a fan-made Pokémon that some fan-made Pokémon games use

Modifications of pre-existing games in the Pokémon series have been present in the Pokémon community since the games originally came out. Early devices such as GameShark and Action Replay allowed players to modify Pokémon games, letting them obtain in-game items and rare Pokémon species with greater ease. When emulation of video games became more popular and made games available to play on computers, fans began to produce full modifications of games. Done through methods such as ROM hacking, modifications of pre-existing games became popular within the Pokémon community and have maintained their popularity as technology to make them has improved. A bootleg pair of games, Pokémon Diamond and Jade, based on the Keitai Denjū Telefang series, were cited as popular inspirations for many early ROM hacks.

ROM hacks tend to add new content, such as custom storylines, new game mechanics, and other features not present in the original games, with some creating entirely new games unrelated to the Pokémon series. Most still tend to follow the sequence of official Pokémon games, often utilizing similar story beats, narrative progression, and mapping styles. Many ROM hacks focus on making quality of life improvements, such as adding features introduced in later installments to older games in the series, or by making more species of Pokémon available to players of the game. ROM hacks can also utilize or add many elements that would not normally be featured in the Pokémon franchise, with many including aspects such as references to sexual themes, language considered vulgar, and violence and gore. Many fan-made games also add fan-made Pokémon species, known as "Fakemon." Another type of fan-made Pokémon game, known as fan games, are more difficult to create and often utilize game development tools separate from hacking the original games. These games often take years for their creators to develop. The 2007 release of Pokémon Essentials, an RPG Maker XP game, made it easier for fans to produce these fangames, allowing a greater ease of creation than before.

Fan games and ROM hacks are popular with the wider Pokémon community, with many popular fan games achieving high player counts and a very large number of individual ROM hacks being produced. Kotaku author Patricia Hernandez stated that "fan games have always been a big part of the culture" in the Pokémon community. Though the creation of fan-produced content for a time was not considered mainstream, the release of Pokémon Essentials has been cited by prominent creators in the community for its ease of use in helping create more fan-made Pokémon games. Due to the reliance on Essentials, many fangames use a 2D art-style, which influences how the games are produced. Many online communities have been formed focusing on these fan-produced games, including forums such as Relic Castle and PokéCommunity.

== Legal issues ==
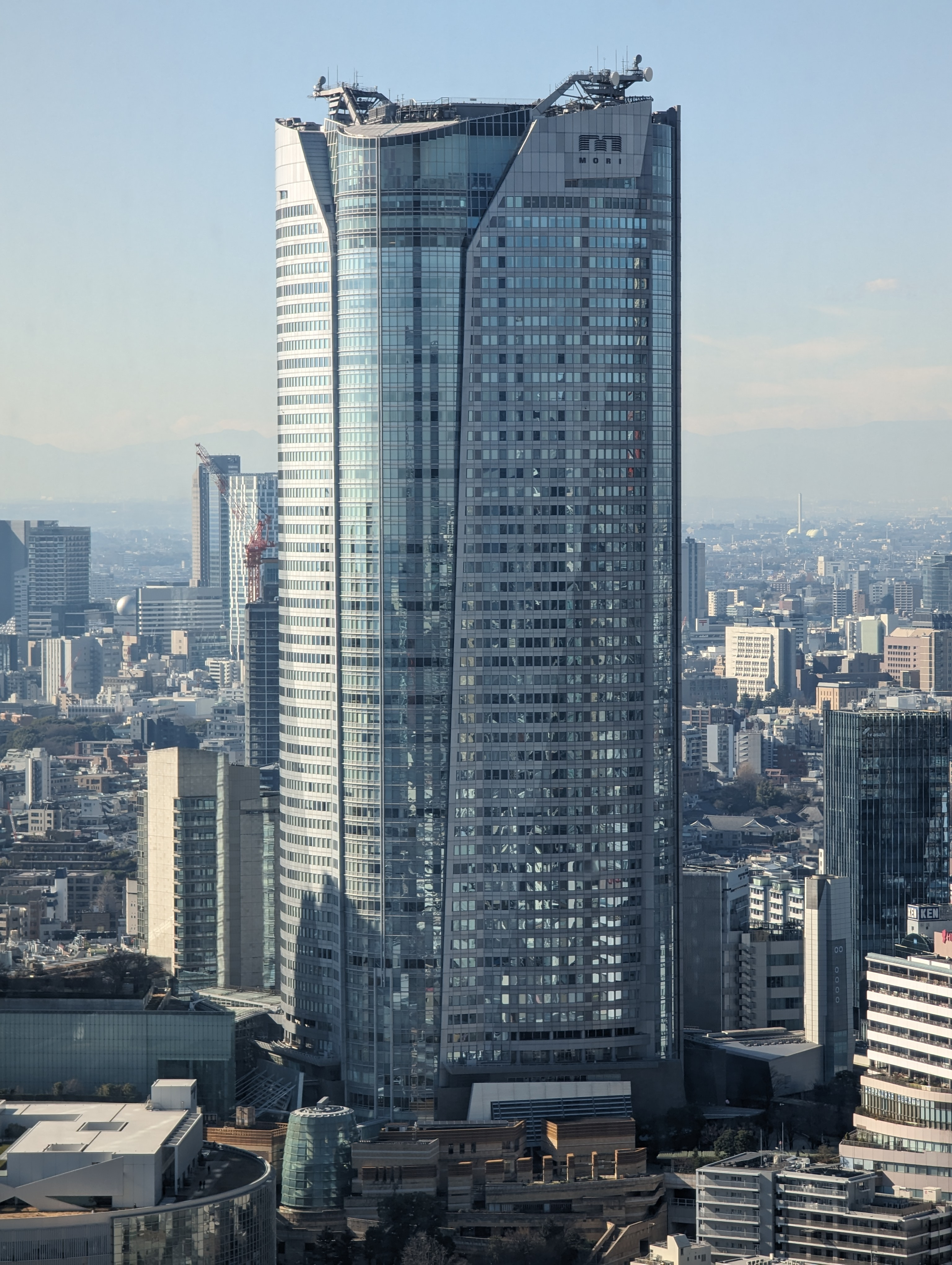
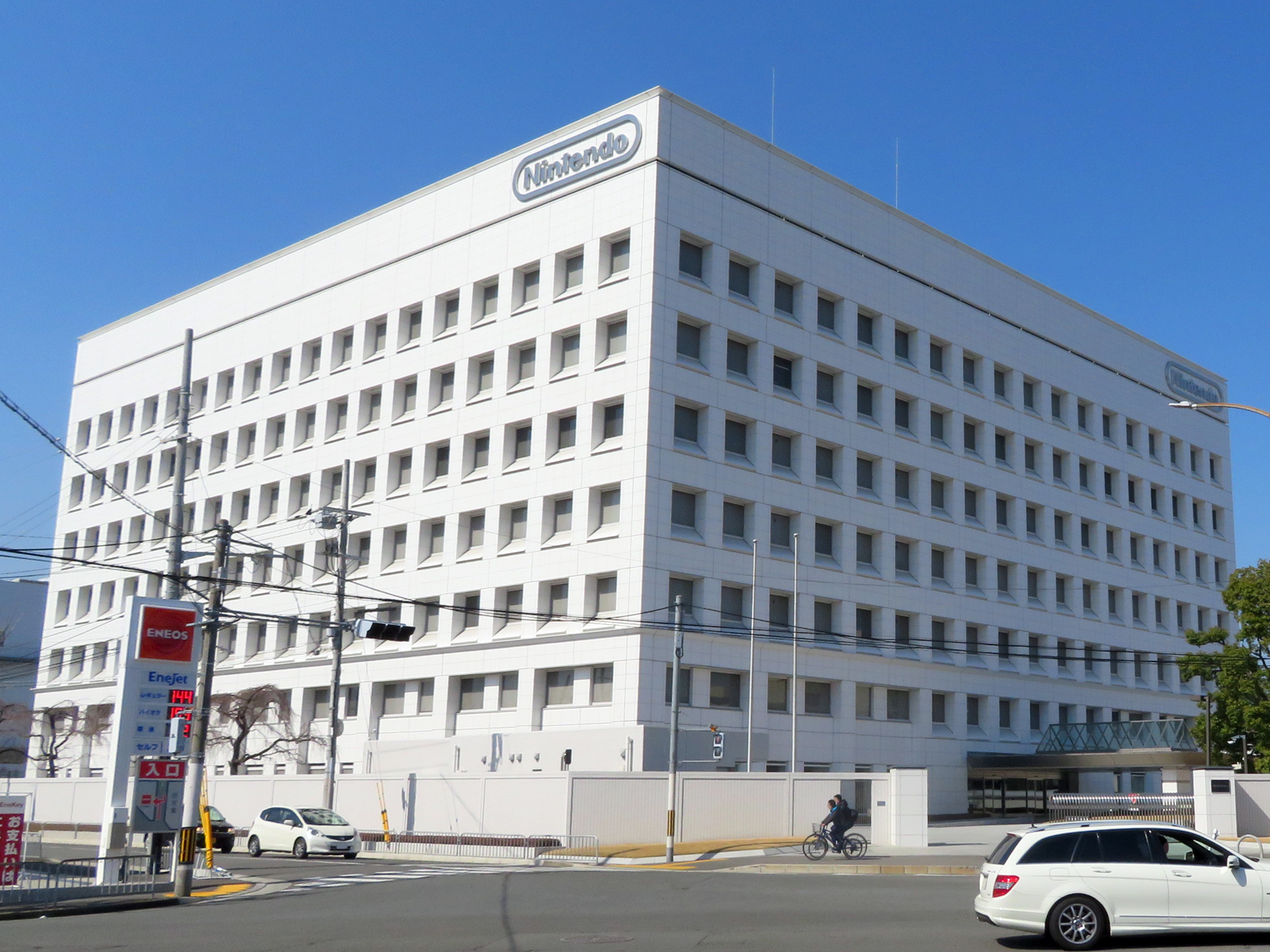
Headquarters of The Pokémon Company (left) and Nintendo (right). Both companies have taken down many fan-made Pokémon games in the past.

The Pokémon Company and Nintendo have attempted to target modifications done to Pokémon games, with newer entries in the series including more anti-modification measures in an attempt to curb hacking. Legal action is frequently threatened against both fan games and modifications of pre-existing Pokémon games though companies have been stated to be more neutral against minor alterations, and do not go after many games directly. IP media strategist Alex Tutty, in an interview with Wired, stated that Nintendo often took action on fangames in order to avoid a given franchise's IP from eroding, as not taking action toward the infringement caused by fan-games would be seen as negligence toward the IP on the part of the company. Lawyer Ryan Morrison, in an interview with PC Gamer, additionally suggested that having a free alternative to paid releases in the form of fan-made Pokémon games threatened sales of Pokémon products. Don McGowan, a former lawyer who worked for The Pokémon Company, stated that he would monitor games that received coverage in the press, though he would often not engage with a given fan-made game on a legal basis until the game received monetary funding. The producer of the Pokémon games, Junichi Masuda, commented on fan-made games, stating that "I see a lot of people on Twitter [sending me] different takes [on Pokémon]... If I see that you are having fun creating things, or working on an art project...working on game development, we kind of share that feeling [of appreciation]." Masuda encouraged individuals who worked on these projects to apply to work on production of official Pokémon games.

Due to the prominence of video sharing sites such as YouTube and Twitch, fan produced games receive more publicity than they did in the past. This publicity has led to an increase in games being shut down by both Nintendo and The Pokémon Company, with notable examples including the fan-game Pokémon Uranium and the ROM hack Pokémon Prism, the latter of which received a cease and desist a few days prior to its release. The website Relic Castle, a major forum and website for fan-made Pokémon games, was taken down by Nintendo and The Pokémon Company in 2024 due to issues of copyright.

The increased risks of legal issues have led to many creators of fan-made games attempting to "play it safe" in regards to promoting their games. ROM hacking communities additionally try to clamp down on the sharing of pirated copies of Pokémon games to use as a base for ROM hacking, often encouraging the purchase of official copies to use instead. Sharing modified games proves difficult due to the inability to share copies of official Pokémon games, both altered and unaltered, as well as due to difficulties with many game systems' firmware.

== List of individual games ==
Game	Release date	Creator	Description
Pokémon Apex	-	Nathan Gunzenhauser	A fan-made Pokémon game designed for adult fans of the series. The game focuses on the player character being sent to another world, where the player must ally with Pokémon to stop a cult from trying to destroy the world. The game has many different gameplay deviations from a standard Pokémon game, featuring different unlock systems to progress to different areas. Pokémon also have altered elemental attributes compared to their normal appearances.
Pokémon Brick Bronze	2015	Llama Train Studio	A fan-made Pokémon game made using Roblox. It was removed from the platform in April 2018 by Roblox administrators, reportedly after copyright concerns were raised by Nintendo. The game was regularly reaching tens of thousands of concurrent users. It was one of many Pokémon games on Roblox, though it was widely considered the most extensive in scope. The game's graphics were mostly a 3D block-style consistent with most games on Roblox, though the Pokémon were each represented by 3DS models in a pixel art style. The game was received positively for its expansiveness, original concepts, and similarity to the source material, though it had been criticized for the implementation of the series' battle system.
Pokémon Crystal Clear	November 13, 2023	ShockSlayer	A ROM hack of Pokémon Crystal that makes many changes to the original game, designed to prioritize player freedom. Many rarer species of Pokémon are more common and players are allowed to battle the game's bosses in any order. The game also adds an open world. The hack grew popular, with many players praising the new additions to the game. Creator ShockSlayer has announced that they are continuing work on further updating the game.
Pokémon Emerald Kaizo	June 19, 2017	SinisterHoodedFigure	A ROM hack of Pokémon Emerald that greatly increases the game's difficulty kaizo-style. The game became infamous in the Pokémon community due to its high difficulty, especially in "Nuzlocke" challenge runs of the game, where players' Pokémon cannot be used again after they have been knocked out once.
Pokémon Essentials	2007	Maruno	A highly popular game tool made in RPG Maker XP that allows players to create their own Pokémon games using assets taken from official games. Essentials has been highlighted for helping to popularize the creation of fangames. The game tool received a takedown notice from Nintendo in 2018, with its associated Wiki being taken down as well. This was done due to the game re-using assets from the official Pokémon games. While it continued to circulate amongst fans, its takedown was seen as a blow to fangame creators. Essentials' takedown was criticised by both critics and fans.
Fontemon	-	Michael Mulet	A turn-based, choice-based parody based in OpenType, a popular font format. The Fakemon in the game are based around real-world fonts, while the game's narrative takes many elements from Minnesota. The player chooses their path ahead by selecting a different letter on their keyboard, with each one choosing a different attack to use against the opponent. Each button press is an individual frame of gameplay, with 4,696 total frames being created for the game. The game has 43 different choices that can be made while playing.
Pokémon Infinite Fusion	2015	Schrroms	A fangame where players are able to fuse two of their Pokémon together. Fused Pokémon have shared attributes from both species and have unique appearances depending on which Pokémon are fused together. There are over 200,000 available fusions in the game that the player can use. The game expands on the story of Pokémon Red and Blue, and additionally revamps areas of the game. The game grew popular, particularly among let's players and streamers on platforms such as YouTube.
Pokémon Insurgence	December 20, 2014	Wyatt Verchere (thesuzerain), Deukhoofd	A Pokémon fangame that focuses on having a "darker" story, featuring subject matter such as cults and death, which are not normally featured in standard Pokémon games. The game also features "Delta Pokémon," which originally featured in the Pokémon Trading Card Game. They are mutated variants of Pokémon species that have different elemental typings and theming from their original species. The game includes many features from a variety of different games throughout the series that are not normally available in one Pokémon game. The darker story was highly requested by fans, but was also criticized, resulting in the addition of a "lighter" story that removes many of the "darker" story elements. The game has become widely popular within the community.
Pokémon Mythic Silver	-	SauceyaTTa	An altered version of the games Pokémon HeartGold and SoulSilver. Mythic Silver overhauls many aspects of the game and additionally adds content from later games in the series, such as Mega Evolutions. The game only allows players to use "strong" species of Pokémon, such as powerful Legendary Pokémon. The game's plot is a sequel to the Pokémon spin-off game Pokémon Mystery Dungeon: Explorers of Sky, with Explorers of Sky's main antagonist Darkrai attempting to get revenge for his defeat in that game.
Pixelmon	2012 or 2013	MrMasochism	A mod of the sandbox game Minecraft. The mod added features from the Pokémon games into Minecraft, allowing players to capture and participate in Pokémon battles. Pokémon spawn randomly throughout Minecraft's overworld, requiring the player to explore the world to find them. Unlike the main series games, Pixelmon lacks a dedicated story or form of progression barring the capture of Pokémon. The mod received frequent updates from the developers throughout the years it was active. The mod received positive reviews from critics and fans alike, and is considered one of the most popular mods for Minecraft, developing a strong cult following. The mod was shut down in 2017 following a request from The Pokémon Company. Following this takedown, the mod team elected not to rebrand the mod, with many developers backing out of the Minecraft modding scene entirely. Despite the shutdown, the mod continued to circulate among its fans.
Pocket Crystal League	May 19, 2022	moodytail	A Pokemon fangame heavily inspired by the Pokémon Trading Card Game and the 2021 video game Inscryption. Players proceed through a progressively more difficult series of opponents in a card game format, upgrading the power of their deck as they proceed. The game's gameplay style takes heavily from Inscryption, though has an additional card slot and implements type advantages, a feature from the Pokémon series, into gameplay.
Pocket Incoming	-	Innovative Game Co., Ltd.	A gacha game originally released in China as Pocket Awakening (Chinese: 口袋觉醒) for mobile phone platforms Android and iOS, the game was produced by Innovative Game Co., Ltd. As of 2024 the game has been in operation for years, going under different names and multiple different versions to avoid copyright litigation from Nintendo. Despite simple gameplay, the title generates revenue from character skins for the individual Pokémon. The game's popularity has been attributed to acting as an alternative to other mobile Pokémon games, which are banned in China. While the game's lengthy animations received praise, Hideaki Fujiwara of Automaton Media suggested its portrayal of some characters may damage the image of the Pokémon franchise.
Pokedoku	-	Doku_Games	A web browser game that acts as a Pokémon-themed version of sudoku. The game uses a three-by-three grid, with three columns and three rows containing different categories, which can relate to different aspects of a Pokémon species, such as type, in-universe region of origin, or if they have a special form or not. Players must select a Pokémon if they match the description given in both an intersecting column and row. Players have limited guesses to select the right answer. Players get a higher score if they choose options that were not widely chosen by other players. Pokedoku offers both daily puzzles and an "unlimited mode," allowing players to play as many games of Pokedoku as they would like.
PokeMMO	July 25, 2012	Squirtle	A massively multiplayer online role-playing game, or MMORPG, based on the Pokémon games. The game has been updated since its release in 2012. The game uses emulator software and requires ROMs of games from throughout the series in order to play, though it alters them to allow for the online multiplayer mechanics.
Pokémon Prism	Unreleased	Adam (Koolboyman)	A Pokémon ROM hack based on Pokémon Crystal. Pokémon Prism takes place in a region known as Naljo, with the player taking the role of the son or daughter of Lance, the Pokémon Champion of Crystal. The game started development in 2008 and development updates were released publicly. The game's trailer gained approximately 1.4 million views, receiving a large amount of attention from fans of the Pokémon series, with large communities forming surrounding the game's release. The game received a cease and desist notice just days prior to the game's release. Following its cancellation, the files for the completed game were leaked onto 4chan by an anonymous group, claiming that they had obtained them because "some dev was careless". The game grew popular among its fanbase following the leak, with fans of the game creating alterations and bug fixes that creator Adam was unable to complete.
Pokémon Sage	In Development	/vp/	A fangame in development by members of the 4chan board /vp/. Sage takes place in a fictional South American-inspired region called Urobos. The game's demo features the player character, named either Simon or Sophia depending on the selected gender, racing against their rival Richardo to become a top Pokémon trainer. Sage has released information regarding hundreds of Fakemon, and features an original map and plot. Sage has an active fanbase, with a Wiki containing all information on the game as it is released. The game's high quality has been considered to be a reason for the strong fan following.
Pokémon Showdown	October 2011	Guangcong “Zarel” Luo	A Pokémon battling simulator which allows players to test strategies and battle against other players. Players can either use a random battle format, which uses pre-made movesets and strategies on a random team of Pokémon, or build their own teams to use in many of the competitive formats available on the website. Showdown is highly associated with popular competitive Pokémon format Smogon, and uses its tiering system for competitive battling. Showdown is primarily used by competitive players, who cite its ease of use and convenience, as it allows them to build and test team compositions without needing to spend time obtaining them in official games. Showdown has over one million unique visitors a month. Showdown was referenced by competitor James Milton Johnson IV on the reality television series Love Is Blind, where he stated he had a strong ranking on the simulator's competitive formats. Showdown's Twitter account later debunked Johnson's claims following the episode's airing.
Pokémon Uranium	August 6, 2016	Involuntary-Twitch	A Pokémon fangame set in a region inspired by Rio de Janeiro. The player character is a 13-year-old who has to leave home due to their caretaker being unable to provide for them. The game features a large number of Fakemon and an in-game elemental type known as Nuclear. Nuclear Pokémon are often corrupted and feral versions of normal Pokémon. The game also has online features, a rare feature in fangames. Uranium proved highly popular within the Pokémon fandom, garnering over 1.5 million downloads within a few weeks of the game's release. Nintendo issued a DMCA takedown notice soon after, causing a Streisand effect. The takedown was met with heavy criticism by the Pokémon fanbase. Uranium, alongside Metroid fan-remake AM2R, were both nominated for the "Best Fan Creation" category at the 2016 Game Awards, though both were pulled following their takedowns by Nintendo.
Pokémon Zeta and Omicron	-	Wyatt Verchere (thesuzerain) and Sir_Willis_CMS	A fangame made using RPG Maker. The game follows the player, whose hometown is destroyed by the villainous team Asgard or Olympus, depending on which game is being played. It includes all Pokémon of the first five generations, as well as some from the sixth generation. The game also includes Delta species, spread over two in-game regions. The game also features multiplayer and an in-game Nuzlocke mode.
