= Cosmic Soldier =

1985 role playing video game

- Developer: Kogado Studio
- Publisher: Kogado Studio
- Series: Cosmic Soldier
- Platforms: MSX, PC-8801
- Release: JP: 1985
- Genre: Role-playing
- Mode: Single-player

Cosmic Soldier (コズミックソルジャー) is a role-playing video game for MSX home computers and is the first game in the Cosmic Soldier series. It was published in 1985 by Kogado Studio. The game was ported to the NEC PC-8801 with an updated interface and graphics.

The game uses a dialog conversation system, where the player can recruit allies by speaking to them, choose whether to kill or spare an enemy, and engage enemies in conversation, similar to the later Megami Tensei franchise. Battles are fought in a turn-based style. The game displays some nudity on the title screen.

== Legacy ==
The 1987 sequel, Psychic War: Cosmic Soldier 2, was originally released for the MSX2 computer in Japan. In America, the game was released by Kyodai, and they changed the name to Psychic War and released the game for MS-DOS computers. The MS-DOS version censors Kayla's clothing. It changed the turn-based combat of its predecessor to a unique "tug of war" style real-time combat system, where battles are a clash of energy between the party and the enemy, with the player needing to push the energy towards the enemy to strike them, while being able to use a shield to block or a suction ability to absorb the opponent's power. The game also improves upon the conversation system of its predecessor and more closely resembles the one in Digital Devil Story: Megami Tensei released around the same time.

== See also ==
- Monster-taming game
