= Coromon =

- Developer: TRAGsoft
- Publisher: indie.io
- Designer: Jochem Pouwels
- Writer: Marcel van der Made
- Series: Coromon
- Platforms: macOS; Windows; iOS; Nintendo Switch; Android
- Release: Windows, macOS; March 31, 2022; Nintendo Switch; July 21, 2022; Android, iOS; November 8, 2023
- Mode: Multiplayer; single-player

Coromon is a 2022 indie monster‑taming role‑playing game developed by TRAGsoft and published by indie.io. (Note: While originally published by Freedom Games, the company has since rebranded as indie.io.) It was released for Windows and macOS on March 31, 2022. The Nintendo Switch version, while originally planned to launch the same day as the Windows and macOS versions, was delayed and launched on July 21, 2022, (Note: A physical version for Nintendo Switch was later announced on April 11, 2024.) followed by the launch on Android and iOS on November 8, 2023. The game follows a new researcher at Lux Solis tasked with exploring the region of Velua to find and fight six Titans while battling Coromon. The game shares similarities with other monster‑tamer titles while introducing systems such as customizable difficulty modes and stamina‑based combat.

It has often been compared to Pokémon.

== Gameplay ==
In Coromon, the player collects and trains creatures called Coromon. Each Coromon has its own type, traits, and skills. Gameplay centers on exploring different areas while solving environmental puzzles, catching Coromon with devices called Spinners, and battling NPCs. The game features over 120 Coromon divided into seven standard elemental types, while an additional six types apply only to skills.

Battles in Coromon use a turn‑based system where each Coromon can equip four moves and spend from a shared pool of Skill Points (SP) to use them. SP can be restored by resting during battle or by using items. Status effects, weather conditions, and passive traits can influence the flow of battles. Held items and fruits provide additional effects such as automatic healing or experience boosts. Because each Coromon has only one elemental type, type matchups play a significant role in determining the outcome of encounters, and certain late‑game opponents use forms that resist all types. Battles can also include mid‑fight evolutions.

Skills are split into three different categories (Physical, Special, and Status) which differ in how they deal damage or apply effects, all drawing from the same SP pool. Major boss encounters, known as Titans, use multiphase battles with changing hazards and mechanics. The same battle system is used in online multiplayer, where players can participate in casual or ranked PvP matches.

=== Difficulty options ===
Coromon includes several difficulty modes, ranging from Easy to Insane, with the highest setting using Nuzlocke-style rules such as limited captures, no escaping battles, and permanent loss of fainted Coromon. A custom mode allows players to adjust individual mechanics, including healing limits, item availability, and capture rules. An optional randomizer can also shuffle encounters, trainer teams, skills, evolutions, and item placement.

=== Potential ===
All Coromon have a stat called Potential, which is a value ranging from 1 to 21 that determines their stat growth and the number of Potential Unlocks they can obtain. A wild Coromon’s Potential is randomized when encountered, and higher values are reflected through alternate coloration. Coromon with Potential values between 17 and 20 are classified as Potent Coromon, appearing as rarer variants with increased stat growth. A Coromon with a Potential of 21 is called a Perfect Coromon, which can be obtained either through rare encounters or by increasing a Potent Coromon’s Potential using the Potentiflator, a device that raises a Coromon’s Potential level.

=== Minigames ===
The game has two optional minigames featuring the Coromon Swurmy: Flappy Swurmy and Swurmy Rush. Flappy Swurmy is a Flappy Bird clone in which players tap or push a button to keep a Swurmy airborne while avoiding obstacles, while Swurmy Rush is an arcade‑style game where players guide a Swurmy as it jumps over hazards for as long as possible.

== Plot ==
The game begins with the player character waking up on their first day as a researcher for Lux Solis. After arriving at the Lux Solis campus, the protagonist selects one of three starter Coromon (Cubzero, Toruga, or Nibblegar) and is then assigned to the Titan Taskforce, which is investigating the sudden appearance of Titan Essences across the Velua region. These Essences originate from six elemental Titans who maintain the planet’s balance, and the player is tasked with collecting them to help Lux Solis understand the disturbance affecting the region.

As the protagonist travels across Velua, they confront each Titan and secure its Essence while assisting towns and dealing with environmental challenges tied to each Titan’s domain along the way. During this journey, the player repeatedly encounters the Wubbonians, an alien group attempting to obtain the Essences for their own purposes. Their actions introduce a dark element called Crimsonite, which begins corrupting parts of Velua and influencing several Titans. By defeating Voltgar, Illuginn, Sart, Hozai, and Vørst, the player gradually uncovers how the Wubbonians’ interference is destabilizing the planet.

The final stage of the journey leads to the ruins of Ixqun, where the planet’s Balance is located and where Chalchiu, the Water Titan, resides. The Wubbonians reveal their plan to resurrect Rhaan, their fallen Dark Titan, in order to reshape Velua into a habitat suitable for their species. Chalchiu becomes possessed by Rhaan, and the player must defeat him to free her and obtain the final Essence. With all six Essences reunited, the Balance is restored and Velua is stabilized. Afterward, the protagonist returns home to continue their work with Lux Solis, while the organization detains the Wubbonians and begins studying their element.

== Development ==
Coromon was developed by Dutch indie studio TRAGsoft. Work began seven years before the game's release. Lead developer Jochem Pouwels cited Game Boy Advance‑era RPGs such as Golden Sun, The Legend of Zelda, and Pokémon as major inspirations, aiming to modernize their exploration‑focused design while retaining a retro pixel‑art aesthetic.

== Reception ==
Reception

Aggregate scores
| Aggregator | Score |
|---|---|
| Metacritic | (PC) 73/100 (NS) 74/100 |
| OpenCritic | 65% recommend |

Review scores
| Publication | Score |
|---|---|
| GamePro | 78/100 |
| Nintendo Life | 7/10 |
| RPGamer | 3.5/5 |

Coromon received mixed to average reviews on PC and Switch according to Metacritic. Ethan Anderson of Twinfinite praised the game’s pixel‑art visuals, creature animations, and customization systems, but criticized its limited type variety, linear type matchups, and Titan battles that he described as overly drawn‑out. Gabriel Zamora of PCMag highlighted the game’s retro presentation, puzzle‑focused dungeons, and intuitive combat. Trent Cannon of Nintendo Life found the game faithful to classic monster‑taming titles, though he reported pacing issues, early‑game difficulty spikes, and a reliance on grinding.

In July 2022, Freedom Games (now indie.io) and TRAGsoft warned players about a fake social media account impersonating the developers to promote a fraudulent blockchain‑enabled version of Coromon. The account used the game’s name and assets without permission and claimed the title would include NFT and BSC blockchain features. The developers stated that Coromon has no blockchain integration and asked players to report the scam.

== Sequel ==
A sequel, Coromon: Rogue Planet, was announced as a standalone roguelite entry that continues the story after the events of the original game.
