= Monster Crown =

2021 video game

- Developer: Studio Aurum
- Publisher: Soedesco
- Platforms: Microsoft Windows; Linux; MacOS; Nintendo Switch; Xbox One; PlayStation 4
- Release: October 12, 2021
- Genres: Role-playing, monster-taming
- Modes: Single-player, multiplayer

Monster Crown is a 2021 role-playing video game developed by Studio Aurum and published by Soedesco. Heavily inspired by the Pokémon series, it features similar gameplay mechanics while adopting a darker fictional universe and storyline. The game received mixed reviews from critics: who praised its gameplay and graphical style, but noted a significant quantity of bugs, performance issues, and poor game balance. The game's story has also been criticized.

== Gameplay ==
Monster Crown features 200 base monsters for the player to form pacts with. Over 1200 monsters are usable in the game through the monster breeding mechanic.

== Development ==
Development of the game was performed by Canadian game developer Studio Aurum, with game development beginning in 2016. The game was crowdfunded on Kickstarter in 2018. In 2019 it was announced that Soedesco would be the publisher of the game.

Monster Crown entered an early access availability period on PC on July 31, 2020, being distributed on Steam during that time. Over 40 updates were made to the game during the early access period.

The 1.0 version of Monster Crown was released on October 12, 2021, for Microsoft Windows, Linux, MacOS, and Nintendo Switch. A physical Nintendo Switch edition of the game was released on November 2, 2021. The PlayStation 4 and Xbox One releases were delayed in late 2021, eventually releasing on February 22, 2022.

== Reception ==
Reception

Aggregate score
Aggregator	Score
Metacritic	NS: 59/100; XONE: 62/100

Review scores
Publication	Score
Nintendo Life	NS: 7/10
Nintendo World Report	NS: 5/10
RPGFan	PC: 71/100

On Metacritic the game received an aggregate score of 59/100 for the Nintendo Switch version, and 62/100 for the Xbox One version, indicating "mixed or average reviews".

Reviewers generally praised the extensive monster breeding mechanics used by the game.

Mitch Vogel of Nintendo Life commented on the aesthetics and audio of the game, noting that they drew inspiration from the Game Boy Color well, while also finding the monster designs generally "uninspired", with a few exceptions.

Neal Chandran of RPGFan positively reviewed the exploration aspects of the game, while noting a more mixed reception to the story, particularly noting poor execution in pacing and dialogue.
