= Monster-taming game =

Video game genre

A monster-taming game (also known as a monster-catching, creature collector game or mon, and sometimes as a Pokémon clone) is a subgenre of role-playing video games. The Pokémon series is the most famous example of this genre.

Monster-taming games share core mechanics such as being able to acquire creatures, train them, and use them to aid the player character in battles and other situations. Though some games have the player character support the creatures in battle with items, others have the player partake in the fighting as well (such as Megami Tensei and spinoff titles, including Persona).

While Pokémon is the most recognizable example worldwide, elements of the genre have been present throughout gaming history. Early examples include Digital Devil Story: Megami Tensei, Cosmic Soldier (1985) and Dragon Quest V, the former two often credited for inventing many aspects of the genre in the 1980s. Pokémon was the first example to popularize focus on the "monster fighting" and "creature raising" aspects of the genre.

== History ==
In Cosmic Soldier (1985), the player can recruit enemies into their party by speaking to them, choosing whether to kill or spare an enemy, and engage enemies in conversation. The Megami Tensei or MegaTen series, beginning with Digital Devil Story: Megami Tensei (1987), features a dialogue system in which players can convince demons to join their party and battle alongside the protagonists. Due to the Satanic panic of the 1980s, the occult-themed series remained exclusive to Japan for many years and it was slow to enter Western markets. In Wizardry IV: The Return of Werdna (1987), monsters can be summoned and made to join the player's party. Dragon Quest V (1992) features monster recruiting and training mechanics. It spawned the Dragon Quest Monsters spin-off series in 1998.

In Robotrek (1994), the player can built up to three robots and send them out during fights. Outside of battle, they are kept in capsules. Robotrek may have been the partial inspiration for the Robopon games.

The Pokémon series, which debuted with Pokémon Red and Blue in 1998, was largely responsible for popularizing the genre. Pokémon was many players' first experience with monster-taming games, and it remains the most successful franchise in the genre.

The contemporaneous Digimon series, which debuted in 1997, also featured similar monster-taming mechanics. Another contemporary entry in the monster-taming genre was the fantasy-themed Jade Cocoon (1998) by Genki, which saw a cult classic 2001 follow-up, Jade Cocoon 2.

While Pokémon and Digimon continued to release new games throughout the ensuing years, in 2011, Level-5 developed the monster-taming game Ni No Kuni: Wrath of the White Witch, which was heavily inspired by the works of Studio Ghibli. They subsequently developed Yo-Kai Watch as a competitor to Pokémon, with its popularity exploding in 2014, and the franchise becoming a cultural phenomenon. However, its popularity declined significantly by 2018, attributed to a variety of factors. In the United States, Studio Wildcard developed and released Ark: Survival Evolved (2015), an open-world monster-taming game themed around prehistoric life.

Many spin-offs from major series revolve around taming monsters, including World of Final Fantasy (2016) and Chocobo's Mystery Dungeon Every Buddy! (2019), based on the long-running Final Fantasy series of Japanese role-playing games, and Monster Hunter Stories (2016) and its sequels, based on Monster Hunter, a best-selling series of action role-playing games.

Nostalgia for the Pokémon series resulted in a wave of indie monster-taming games. Siralim Ultimate (2021) built on its longtime community for success, while Monster Crown (2021), despite Game Boy Color-inspired graphics, had an intentionally dark narrative. One of the more popular examples, Temtem (2022), sold more than 500,000 copies in a single month on Steam. Coromon (2022) passed 100,000 sales on Windows and Mac, with more on other platforms. However, there has not been a mega-hit comparable to the influence of Stardew Valley (2016) in the farming sim genre, which developers blame on Pokémon's huge cultural impact. The developers see terms such as "Pokémon-like" or "Pokémon clone" as derogatory, implying they are attempts to cash in on the popularity of Pokémon rather than unique games of their own.

Palworld, a game centered around monster-catching, skyrocketed to the second most-played game on Steam after it was released for early access in January 2024. The game was nicknamed "Pokémon with guns". On September 19, 2024, Nintendo and The Pokémon Company filed a lawsuit against Palworld developer Pocketpair claiming an infringement of patent rights.
