= Genesis Survivor Gaiarth =

Japanese OVA series

創世機士ガイアース (Jeneshisu Sabaibā Gaiāsu)
- Original video animation
- Directed by: Shinji Aramaki (ep. 1); Masayuki Oozeki (ep. 2); Hideaki Oba (ep. 3)
- Produced by: Hiroshi Takao; Naotake Kokubo; Nobuo Takeuchi
- Written by: Hiroyuki Kitazume
- Music by: Takehito Nakazawa
- Studio: AIC & Artmic
- Released: April 22, 1992 – April 28, 1993
- Runtime: 45 minutes (each)
- Episodes: 3

Genesis Survivor Gaiarth (創世機士ガイアース, Jeneshisu Sabaibā Gaiāsu) was an anime OVA series produced by AIC and Artmic in 1992. The story takes place in a post-apocalyptic, dystopian future, chronicling the story of a young man named Ital Del Labard and his partner, the war-roid Zaxon. It was licensed and distributed in North America in 1993 by AnimEigo, an anime subtitling/licensing company. It was released on VHS and Laserdisc with the title Genesis Surviver [sic] Gaiarth. This title is still one of the publisher's many titles without a DVD release in the United States. There has only been a DVD release of the title in Japan published by Geneon Universal.

== Story ==
=== Stage 1 ===
The story begins with Ital in the care of an aging war-roid named Randis R. Khiezard. Raised from childhood by the machine, he is under the impression that a war is still going on in the world around him. Randis was once part of the imperial forces fighting against the republic, assigned to a distant outpost where he first found Ital. In a skirmish, Randis lost his old human partner and was apparently assumed destroyed. Left at his post, having no contact with the rest of the world, he raised Ital in isolation, and never heard of the end of the war.

Ital, now a teenager, has ambitions of becoming an imperial soldier and fighting the republic like his "father" Randis did. One day after his morning routine, the small outpost—which has become something of a farm in recent times—is attacked by a troop of autosoldiers, robotic assault units used in the war by the republic. These are guided by the beastmaster, an imposing individual atop a massive machine, who challenges Randis and demands to see an individual named Sakuya, of whom Randis has no knowledge. In the ensuing conflict, Randis is destroyed while Ital looks on, helpless to do anything. The beastmaster has his autosoldiers ransack the outpost, then departs, leaving Ital the only survivor of the incident.

A montage follows, in which Ital decides to depart the outpost with the few possessions he has left and track down the beastmaster for revenge. His travels take him across nearly 500 km of terrain before he winds up encountering a group of what he believes are imperial soldiers, hunting down republican units. When one of the supposed soldiers is chasing after an especially fast unit, Ital notices something hidden under the sand ahead of their position. He believes it to be a republican autobase, buried and still capable of attacking. Rushing down to assist the alleged soldier, he throws her from the robotic horse/hover cycle she's on and is consequently swallowed by the autobase as it rises from the sand.

Within the autosoldier, he encounters the warroid known as Zaxon, who has been deactivated. Ital attempts to revive him, only to realize he's attracted autosoldiers living within the autobase with Zaxon's newly revived energy signature. His power sword, a weapon requiring power to heat the edge, fails him midway through the battle. Ital is saved by Zaxon, who as it turns out was sufficiently reactivated by his efforts.

After doing away with the autosoldiers, Zaxon and Ital destroy the autobase's main generator, then escape. From there, they enter the city of Bangor, where they are arrested for being suspicious individuals. They then encounter a powerful warroid in charge of the city, one Lord Warlock, protector of the people. He seems to recognize Zaxon, but his council protests. Here the viewer learns that Zaxon was the name of an old war hero, who vanished when the conflict came to an end. Zaxon, having no memory of events before Ital reactivated him, cannot confirm or deny Warlock's suspicions. At the very least, they both learn the war ended over a century ago. They are dismissed by Warlock and spend the night in a cell, to be released in the morning.

The next day, Ital and Zaxon run into Sahari, the soldier who Ital rescued from being devoured by the autobase. As it turns out, she and her group are not soldiers at all, but junk hunters, mercenaries of a sort who hunt down autosoldiers and salvage them for parts. She invites Ital to dinner, at which point a fight breaks out when Sahari makes an untoward comment about the cowardice of Bangor's populace. The viewer also learns that the city has been attacked more and more frequently by autosoldiers, whom the residents of Bangor claim to be "mindless beasts", acting on their programming.

When warroid marshals show up to break up the fight, the group is saved by Fayk, a junk hunter with a talent for electronic magic that jams the marshals' programming and allows the others to escape through the sewers. It isn't long, however, before the city of Bangor comes under attack by the beastmaster, and Ital and Zaxon are witnesses to a firefight between the beastmaster and Lord Warlock. Either side makes heavy use of electronic magic, but in the end the beastmaster gains the upper hand, overloading Warlock when he plugs himself into the city to draw energy from all of Bangor's systems.

With Warlock slain, the city is in danger of having its central reactor overloading, a problem only Zaxon can remedy. In his last moments, Warlock passes on his access codes to Zaxon, who enters the central tower and receives all the knowledge kept therein. He then unites with the city and shuts down the reactor. In the ongoing fight outside the tower, Sahari is almost killed by the beastmaster, but saved at the last minute by Zaxon. With Bangor safe, he challenges the beastmaster and seals off access to the city's network so that the beastmaster cannot use the same trick again. He and Ital overpower the beastmaster, then destroy him, although they appear to die as the beastmaster's massive chariot falls from the tower balcony, taking them with it.

When the smoke clears, Bangor's citizens crowd around to see the fate of the heroes. It appears Zaxon had caught Ital in the fall, and both rise from the wreckage, unharmed. The first episode comes to an end as the camera pans back, leaving the viewer to expect a sequel.

=== Stage 2 ===
After defeating the Beast-Master, Ital, Zaxon and Sahari travel to Metro City, where a gigantic Kampfdraken has reportedly awakened. Our heroes confidently engage the monster, only to discover that it's more than they bargained for. When the Draken is finally defeated, they discover that it is guarding a treasure, an egg containing a mysterious Elf, a synthetic human named Sakuya—the same Sakuya that the BeastMaster was searching for. But when Sakuya awakens, the mysterious General is able to set his terrible plan into motion...

=== Stage 3 ===
Sakuya is captured by the diabolical General, who plans to use her to dominate the world—or destroy it in the attempt! Can Ital, Sahari, Fayk and Zaxon the amnesiac War-roid rescue Sakuya, defeat the General, and save Gaiarth from a fate worse than Armageddon?

== Cast ==
Genesis Survivor Gaiarth cast
Role		Japanese		English
Role		Japanese		Swirl Films (1995)
Ital Del Labard		Daiki Nakamura	Daiki Nakamura	Ralph Brownewell
Sahari		Noriko Hidaka	Noriko Hidaka	Belinda Bizic-Keller
Zaxon		Akio Ootsuka	Akio Ootsuka	Rick Forrester
Fayk		1	Shin'ichirou Miki	Joe Bunn
Fayk		2-3	Yoshito Yasuhara	Joe Bunn
Sakuya		Mako Hyoudou	Mako Hyoudou	Amy Parrish
The General		Toshihiko Seki	Toshihiko Seki	Pierre Brulatour
1	Randis R. Khaizard	Shunsuke Shima	Shunsuke Shima	Doug Krehbiel
1	Beastmaster (1)	Rokurou Naya	Rokurou Naya	Scott Simpson
1	Lord Warlock	Nobuo Tanaka	Nobuo Tanaka	Lee Domenick
1	Lord Bangor III	Kousei Yagi	Kousei Yagi	Steve Vernon
1	Council Members			Robert Wailes Chris Nubel David Stokes Tom Landrigan
1	Hardin	Kouichi Kitamura	Kouichi Kitamura	Mike Wiley
1	Andre			Robert Hood
1	Brate			Michael Schuttie
1	Horns			Steve Rassin
1	Specs			Mac Ingraham
1	War-roids			Chris Jarman
1	Announcer			Marianne Nubel
2	Barbarossa	Kouji Nakata	Kouji Nakata	Chris Jarman
2	Wisemen			Norm Shore Grenoldo Frazier Eric Paisley Chris Nubel
2	Security War-roid			Noel Rivenbark
2	Craftsmen			Steve Vernon Tim Breeding
2	Zoniac	Kiyoshi Kawakubo	Kiyoshi Kawakubo	Phil Loch
3	Beastmaster (2)	Rokurou Naya	Rokurou Naya	Tim Breeding
3	Warspite Attendants			Melissa Stanley Joann Luzzatto
3	Queen Ayatolla	Rihoko Yoshida	Rihoko Yoshida	Marianne Nubel
3	Pool Girls			Sandy Shores Frances McDorman

== Reception ==
In her book 500 Essential Anime Movies Helen McCarthy commented that Genesis Survivor Gaiarth "offers some interesting concepts, including a thoughtful treatment of the idea of magic as technology that's too far ahead of its users to be accepted as normal". She stated that older children and young teenagers would enjoy the anime, and noted that "this attractively designed, expensive looking science fantasy saga has a number of established and future stars on the crew list", specifically Hiroyuki Kitazume and Shinji Aramaki.
