= Kousei Yagi =

Japanese voice actor

Kōsei Yagi
- 八木 光生
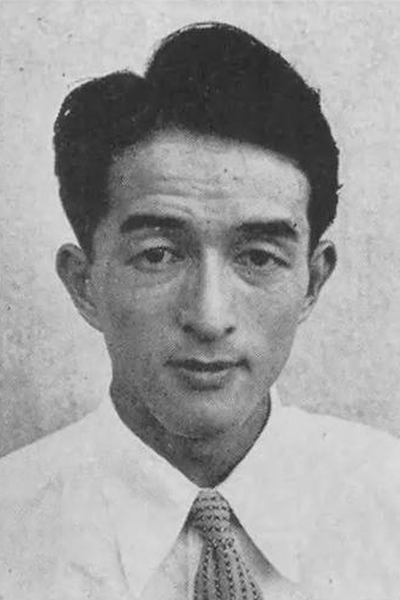
- Born: February 13, 1930 (age 96); Hyōgo Prefecture, Japan
- Occupations: Actor; voice actor
- Years active: 1951–present
- Agent: 81 Produce

Kousei Yagi (八木 光生, Yagi Kōsei; born February 13, 1930 in Hyōgo, Japan) is a Japanese voice actor affiliated with 81 Produce.

== Voice roles ==
- Bakumatsu Kikansetsu Irohanihoheto (Koma no Shouten-sama)
- Blue Submarine No. 6 (Kouichi Nakamura)
- Galaxy Angel (Kryzman)
- Genesis Survivor Gaiarth (Bangor III (Ep.1))
- Parasol Henbe (Senbee)
- Mobile Suit Gundam - The Movie Trilogy (Elran (Special Edition))
- O-bake no... Holly (Chocola-jiisan)
- Petite Princess Yucie (Drago)
- Rurouni Kenshin (Kaishu Katsu (ep. 79–82))

=== Dubbing ===
- The Rescuers (Gramps)
- Robin Hood (Little John)
