= Fakemon =

Fanmade fictional creatures based on Pokémon

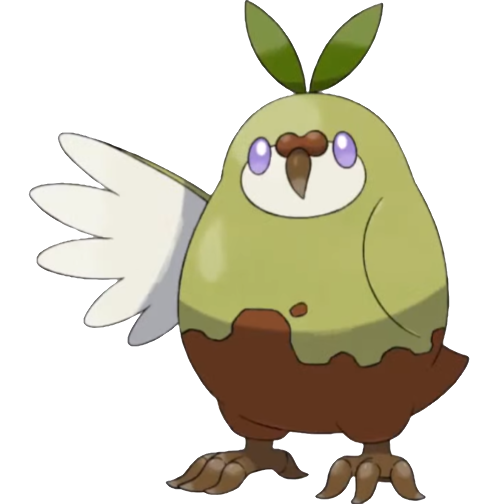
Example of a Fakemon in the style of Ken Sugimori's artwork

Fakemon, also called Fakémon, are unofficial, fanmade fictional creatures based on the Pokémon franchise of monster-taming games.

While many such designs have been created purely as fan art, others are made specifically as hoaxes to fool fans into believing they will appear in future series titles, or as unique creatures added to game mods.

== Etymology ==
The word Fakemon is a portmanteau of the words fake and Pokémon. In Japanese, they are known as Oripoké (オリポケ; from "original Pokémon").

== Origin ==
According to GameRant, Fakemon have existed "for almost as long as Pokémon itself", but began to proliferate with the advent of fan-made video games as well as the advent of the internet.

Founded in 1998, "Mewthree and Frogglet's Pokémon Factory" (later called Pokémon Factory) became the first website to formalize the creation of Fakemon. A public forum, it required members to post their creation to other members, who would provide critique until its revisions deemed it "presentable for review by Pokémon Factory staff." The intent of the website was to create "an outlet for fan innovations in pokémon [sic] ."

The popularity of the creatures has led to the creation of various online Fakemon image generators. For example, in 2022, Lambda Labs researcher Justin Pinkney created Text-to-Pokémon, which utilizes Stable Diffusion to create creatures based on a user's written prompt. The model was trained on "BLIP captioned Pokémon images with two NVIDIA RTX A6000 GPUs on the Lambda GPU Cloud for around 15,000 steps."

As of 2024, Fakemon are popular on websites such as DeviantArt, Instagram, TikTok, and Reddit, as well as YouTube. Some Fakemon designers are professional artists in the video game industry. Fakemon design has been described as "a way for fans to express their individuality while honoring the franchise they love."

== Design ==
Like official Pokémon, many Fakemon designs consist of multiple evolutionary stages

Fakemon are designed by fans of the Pokémon franchise using design principles from the Pokémon video games and anime, such as color, level of detail, anatomy, and relatability. Fakemon designers have employed the use of Microsoft Paint and Photoshop to mimic the pixel art of the Pokémon video games. Fans design Fakemon based on real-world concepts such as culture, architecture, animals, plants, and mythology.

Fakemon are often created to accompany fan-made Pokémon regions or games. For example, the fan game Pokémon Uranium has over 150 Fakemon featured in it.

== Confusion with real Pokémon ==
Fakemon designs have occasionally been so similar to the visual language of Pokémon that they have been confused for real leaks. For example, a set of three fake fire, water, and grass starter Pokémon were created by Leopoldo Spagna as a hoax in 2018, prior to the announcement of Pokémon Sword and Shield. Spagna's designs were featured on multiple websites as a legitimate rumor, leading fans to create fan art and memes of the supposed Pokémon. While he later apologized for the hoax, PokéNinja, a Twitch streamer, backed a special tier of the Kickstarter for Temtem, a game resembling Pokémon, putting forth one of the fake Pokémon, Platypet, as a monster design. Platypet was first included within the game when it released early access through Steam on January 21, 2020. In the game's universe, Platypet stars in a cartoon about toxic-elemental Temtem creatures.

The 2024 Game Freak data breach revealed that a ninth, Flying-type evolution of Eevee had been planned for the 2016 games Pokémon Sun and Moon, but scrapped due to similarities to a design made by a fan.

== See also ==
- Original character – Type of fictional character
- Ponysona – Personalized pony character created by the brony fandom
