= Digital Devil Story: Megami Tensei II =

1990 role-playing game

- Famicom cover art
- Developers: Atlus (FC); Opera House (SFC)
- Publishers: Namco (FC); Atlus (SFC)
- Director: Kouji Okada
- Artist: Kazuma Kaneko
- Writers: Kazunari Suzuki; Ryutaro Ito
- Composer: Tsukasa Masuko
- Series: Megami Tensei
- Platforms: Famicom, Super Famicom, mobile
- Release: Famicom: JP: April 6, 1990; Super Famicom: JP: March 31, 1995; Mobile: JP: September 1, 2006
- Genre: Role-playing
- Mode: Single-player

Digital Devil Story: Megami Tensei II (Note: Dejitaru Debiru Sutōrī: Megami Tensei Tsū (デジタル・デビル物語 女神転生II; lit. Digital Devil Story: Reincarnation of the Goddess II)) is a 1990 role-playing video game developed by Atlus and published by Namco for the Famicom. An enhanced Super Famicom port was developed by Opera House and released by Atlus in 1995. The second entry in the Megami Tensei series, the gameplay features the unnamed protagonist exploring a post-apocalyptic wasteland, battling and recruiting demons as they are pushed into taking part in a conflict between the demonic forces of Lucifer and the army of the One True God.

Development began in 1987 following the release of Digital Devil Story: Megami Tensei. While the first game was an adaptation the Digital Devil Story novels, Megami Tensei II has an original story that examines preconceptions surrounding the portrayal of order and chaos. Kouji Okada and Tsukasa Masuko returned as director and composer, while artwork was designed by Kazuma Kaneko. The game received critical acclaim upon release, was partially remade in the 1992 Super Famicom title Shin Megami Tensei, and is regarded as an influential entry in the series.

== Gameplay ==
Battling or recruiting demons while exploring the game's dungeon environments is a key part of Megami Tensei II.

Digital Devil Story: Megami Tensei II is a role-playing video game in which players take the role of an unnamed man who explores the post-apocalyptic remains of Tokyo. Like its predecessor, Megami Tensei II has players navigate dungeon environments in first-person, but between dungeons they also navigate an overworld from an overhead perspective. During their journey, the protagonist's party can visit shops and towns to gain additional story information and to purchase items using in-game currency. As they progress through the story, the protagonist is presented with morality-based dialogue options which influence how people respond to him and ultimately determine which ending is received.

The turn-based battles are triggered through random encounters. The player has several options, including fighting and fleeing from battle. The number of enemies are indicated by small sprites on the bottom of the battle screen. During their turn in combat, the protagonist and current companion can perform an action such as attacking using melee or ranged attacks such as magic, or use an item which can weaken the enemy or strengthen the player party. Upon successfully completing a battle, the party is rewarded with experience points, skill points, items and money. Skill points are assigned to the protagonist's attributes such as speed or magic, modifying future performance in battle.

In addition to fighting, the party can talk with demons they encounter, and through a negotiation process persuade them to join their party. Using a special location in the game world, players can fuse two different demons into a new demon, with the new demon inheriting skills from both its parents. The choices made by the protagonist during the story impact which demons can be recruited. The attitude of demons towards the player is governed by the moon phase, which cycles through eight phases from new to full.

== Plot ==
The story is set in "20XX", 35 years after a nuclear apocalypse which devastates the world and permanently opens a portal to the demon world of Atziluth. Humanity is forced to survive in underground bunkers. Two such survivors, the protagonist and his friend, release a demon called Pazuzu from a video game. Pazuzu tells the two that they are destined messiahs who will save mankind. He grants the Hero the ability to summon and talk to demons, and his friend the gift of magic. Pazuzu gives them the mission of destroying the demon lords that have taken control of Tokyo, starting with Bael, the demon that sealed him inside Devil Busters.

The heroes venture outside the shelter, and they are recognized as messiahs by the Church of Messiah. Upon reaching Tokyo Tower, however, the heroes find a witch who was also named a messiah by Pazuzu, but claims he has been manipulating them for his own gain. The friend refuses to believe that Pazuzu is using them. In order to progress in the story, the player has to side with the witch, causing the friend to leave and become his enemy. The Messiah and the witch travel around Tokyo and defeat the warring demon lords that attempt to take control of the city, disbanding the Cult of Deva in the process, and eventually kill Pazuzu himself. Meanwhile, the hero's friend frees Lucifer from the seal placed upon him in the previous game. Eventually, the heroes reach Bael, who kills the hero's friend as he attempts to fulfill Pazuzu's will. The hero avenges his friend, and when he defeats Bael the demon turns into a tiny frog: the player can choose to kill the frog or take it with them.

The Messians instruct the hero to use the Seven Pillars of Solomon, collected during his travels, at ground zero of the missile attacks in order to open a gateway to the demon world of Atziluth and defeat the demons once and for all. Once in the demon world, the heroes travel through several areas and defeat the ruling demon overlords. If the heroes are carrying Bael with them, they can choose to restore him into his true form, the god Baal, by allowing the frog to merge with the demon Beelzebub. The god Izanagi also asks the heroes to rescue the goddess Izanami, who has been killed by the demons.

After defeating all the overlords and managing to revive Izanami, the gods help the heroes travel to Lucifer's castle. If Bael has been restored into Baal, Lucifer explains that the demons are actually ancient gods cast into hell by the One True God, who is using the party to defeat his enemies, destroy both worlds and create a paradise where mankind will be under his rule forever. Lucifer offers to help the player prevent God's plans, and claims that Satan, who was responsible for the nuclear war, must be dealt with. The heroes then travel back to the human world to confront Satan. If they did not accept Lucifer's help and killed him instead, they defeat Satan and are then transported before God, who turns them into new deities and creates the Millennial Kingdom. If Lucifer is in their party, they have the chance to do battle with God. After defeating the god, he warns them that he will revive in time, and that without his help they have chosen a difficult path. Lucifer then returns to Atziluth with all the demons, sealing the rift between worlds and leaving humans to rebuild and recover from the war on their own.

== Development ==
The original Digital Devil Story: Megami Tensei, a video game based on the Digital Devil Story trilogy by writer Aya Nishitani, was developed by Atlus and published by Namco in 1987. The game met with critical and commercial success, and according to director Kouji Okada gave the Atlus team "breathing room" for developing a second game. Okada recalled that due to space limitations with the original, Atlus had a lot of work they could not include. Okada used Megami Tensei II to include their discarded ideas. While the original game used a first-person viewpoint for the entire game outside some cutscenes, Megami Tensei II used an overhead view for navigation and first-person for combat. This was done at the suggestion of staff due to issues of getting lost that plagued the original. As with the first game, priority was given to programming and game design over other aspects such as narrative. The music was composed by Tsukasa Masuko, who had worked on the previous game and incorporated his earlier work. The music quality could be greatly increased due to the incorporation of a dedicated memory map.

The character and demon designs were created by Kazuma Kaneko. Megami Tensei II was Kaneko's first work on the series, having played the first game and come to work at Atlus without knowing they were its developers. When creating the demon designs, Kaneko was inspired by the monsters featured in the Godzilla series, wanting to put his own design twist on creatures both from Japanese folklore and world mythology. For each design, he took their main mythical characteristics and the wide differences between creatures from different cultures, and incorporated them into the game. His demons' attitudes drew inspiration from North American mythology with their wish to feed on the negative emotions of humans. Commenting later, he felt his early designs were "forced", and said that Nintendo were concerned about the mature aspects of his demon designs to the point of asking him to remove the nipples from a naked female figure.

While the original game was based on Nishitani's novels, for the second game Atlus decided to create an original story, a change done with Nishitani's permission. The game's scenario, demon conversations and world design were written by Kazunari Suzuki, who had also worked on the original story elements for the first game. A second writer on the project was Ryutaro Ito. Work had already started on the project when he joined Atlus at the recommendation of Suzuki's father. Ito was responsible for much of the character dialogue, including the notably apathetic greetings of shop owners. A controversial scene where the protagonist lost his arm was inspired by a scene in the second Star Wars movie The Empire Strikes Back. As a homage to the original novels by Nishitani, Ito included the name of the novels' protagonist during the closing segment of the game.

== Release ==
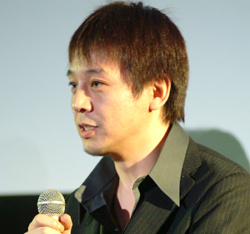
Hitoshi Sakimoto arranged the music for the Super Famicom version.

Megami Tensei II was released for the Famicom by Namco on April 6, 1990, on a 4-megabit cartridge. The game was ported to mobiles; it released on September 1, 2006, for NTT DoCoMo models, and for the Vodafone live! service on December 1 of the same year.

The game received an enhanced port for the Super Famicom by Japanese developer Opera House, combining the game with its predecessor. For this version, the graphics were reworked, the gameplay adjusted, and the demon artwork redrawn by Kaneko, who by then was established as the illustrator for the series. The music was arranged by Hitoshi Sakimoto. Titled Kyuuyaku Megami Tensei, (Note: (旧約・女神転生; lit. The Old Testament: Reincarnation of the Goddess)) the port was released on March 31, 1995.

This version was re-released on the Virtual Console for Wii on July 3, 2012. No version of the game has been released outside Japan. This has been attributed to Nintendo's policy of censoring religious references in games, which rendered the early Megami Tensei titles unsuitable for localization due to their central religious elements. A fan translation of Kyuuyaku Megami Tensei was released on August 28, 2014.

== Reception ==
Reception

Review score
Publication	Score
Famitsu	8/10, 8/10, 9/10, 8/10 (FC); 8/10, 7/10, 8/10, 5/10 (SFC)

Four reviewers reviewed the Family Computer version of the game in the Japanese gaming magazine Famitsu. The four reviewers noted the game's improvements over the first game. Its demon fusion mechanics and improved mapping system were praised with one reviewer saying that without it, it would have been a generic RPG. One reviewer felt that the pace was too slow. Kurt Kalata and Christopher J. Snelgrove of Hardcore Gaming 101 called the graphics and music superior to the original, calling it the game where the Megami Tensei series "really began to take shape".

Reviewing the Super Famicom compilation port, one reviewer in Famitsu found the first game to only be nostalgic, while the Megami Tensei II was very worthwhile. The reviewer said that while many elements of the game have been made easier, it was still very difficult.

In its retrospective on the series, Japanese magazine Yougo praised the game's cautionary message concerning black and white morality, praising its mixture of cyberpunk and occult elements, and citing it as the reason the Megami Tensei series continued. Kalata, in an article for 1UP.com, traced the series' use of mature content and adult themes to the storyline of Megami Tensei II.

== Legacy ==
Following the release of Megami Tensei II, Atlus acquired the rights to both develop and publish further Megami Tensei titles. Wanting to develop a new Megami Tensei with the company's brand on it, Atlus created the next entry for the Super Famicom, partially remaking the story of Megami Tensei II while greatly expanding its story and gameplay systems. The game, titled Shin Megami Tensei, was released in 1992. The game was a critical and commercial success, establishing the Megami Tensei brand and spawning multiple sequels and spin-off series.
