= Digital Devil Story =

Series of science fiction novels by Aya Nishitani

- Cover of the first novel, Megami Tensei

デジタル・デビルストーリー (Dejitaru Debiru Sutōrī)
- Genre: Science fiction
- Novel series

Digital Devil Story
- Written by: Aya Nishitani
- Illustrated by: Hiroyuki Kitazume
- Published by: Tokuma Shoten
- Imprint: Animage Bunko
- Original run: March 1986 – February 1988
- Volumes: 3
- Original video animation

Digital Devil Story: Megami Tensei
- Directed by: Mizuho Nishikubo
- Produced by: Hideo Ogata; Yutaka Takahashi
- Written by: Mizuho Nishikubo
- Music by: Usagi-gumi
- Studio: J.C. Staff; Animate Film
- Licensed by: UK: Kiseki Films
- Released: March 25, 1987
- Runtime: 45 minutes
- Episodes: 1
- Novel series

New Digital Devil Story
- Written by: Aya Nishitani
- Illustrated by: Hiroyuki Kitazume
- Published by: Tokuma Shoten
- Imprint: Animage Bunko
- Original run: March 1990 – December 1993
- Volumes: 6

Digital Devil Story (Note: Japanese: デジタル・デビル・ストーリー, Hepburn: Dejitaru Debiru Sutōrī) is a series of science fiction novels written by Aya Nishitani, illustrated by Hiroyuki Kitazume, and published by Tokuma Shoten's Animage Bunko imprint. Originating as a short story in December 1985, the series is split into two parts; the original Digital Devil Story trilogy (1986-1988), and the six volume sequel New Digital Devil Story (1990-1993). The stories depict different high school students, reincarnations of Japanese Shinto deities, as the world is attacked by rival demonic and divine factions summoned through computer technology.

Nishitani created the premise of Digital Devil Story while working on electronic systems at Toshiba. He drew inspiration from the writing of Ryō Hanmura and H. P. Lovecraft, blending world mythology with occult and Buddhist elements. A central theme through the series was the trials and fate of protagonist Akemi Nakajima, with the original trilogy's conclusion seeing a mixed reaction from his publisher when he presented it. Kitazumi's art was chosen by Nishitani to soften the tragic elements of the story. For New Digital Devil Story, begun due to fan demand, Nishitani adjusted his writing style and collaborated with Kitazumi on character designs.

For its two re-releases, Nishitani revised the writing to be more in step with the times, but feels the story is too grounded in its original time for a modern digital release. As of 2026 the original novels remain exclusive to Japan, although Nishitani revealed he was seeking an English publisher for them. Digital Devil Story as a whole sold 800,000 copies in Japan, while the first novel Megami Tensei saw multimedia expansions including an original video animation adapting the first novel, and a video game adaptation. The video game was the origin of Atlus's Megami Tensei franchise, which has become internationally popular.

== Overview ==
The original Digital Devil Story trilogy follows two third year students at Jusei High School; Akemi Nakajima, a brilliant but socially aloof student who suffers from bullying, and Yumiko Shirasagi, a recent transfer. Akemi and Yumiko are revealed to be reincarnations of the Shinto deities Izanagi and Izanami, giving them mystical powers and creating a strong emotional bond. In the first book, as an act of vengeance against the school bullies, Akemi combines his computing skills and knowledge of the occult to summon Loki to kill them. Eventually Loki breaks free of Akemi's control after Akemi refuses to offer Yumiko as a sacrifice; Yumiko is mortally wounded, forcing Akemi to take her to Izanami's resting place to restore her, battling Loki along the way. In the second book, the god Set manifests and begins to manipulate world governments, while capturing Yumiko and using her as a medium to maintain his form. When given the chance to kill Yumiko and stop further demonic attacks, Akemi instead saves her. The third book sees Lucifer appear and manipulate events to entrap Akemi and condemn him to death for causing the demonic invasion. Broken by his experiences, Akemi goes berserk, forcing Izanami to kill him while possessing Yumiko.

The New Digital Devil Story sequel series is set four years later in the demon-controlled world, where Lucifer fights off other factions who seek to control Earth, and an alliance of Japanese deities who want to save it. The story primarily follows two new Jusei High School students; Kita Asuka and Reiko Kido, the respective reincarnations of Susanoo and Amaterasu. After awakening to their powers, they join a human resistance force and rescue Yumiko, who was captured by Lucifer's forces so her power could keep them stabilised in the human world; their holding process has driven Yumiko insane. Kita and Reiko receive guidance from Akemi's spirit in finding Yumiko and restoring her sanity. Akemi and Yumiko, who are being used by multiple factions within the conflict, eventually both choose reincarnation so they can be reunited. The conflict becomes divided between the Japanese alliance, the forces of goddess Hel, and the competing wills of Lucifer and the archangel Gabriel. One of the Japanese faction, the reborn Emperor Sutoku, pursues his own vendetta against God by causing widespread devastation, fighting Lucifer to the death in the process. God forcibly ends the conflict by crashing a meteor onto Earth, which Kita and Reiko narrowly survive. New Digital Devil Story ends thirty years later with the world struggling to rebuild, and Akemi and Yumiko's new forms reuniting.

== Concept and development ==
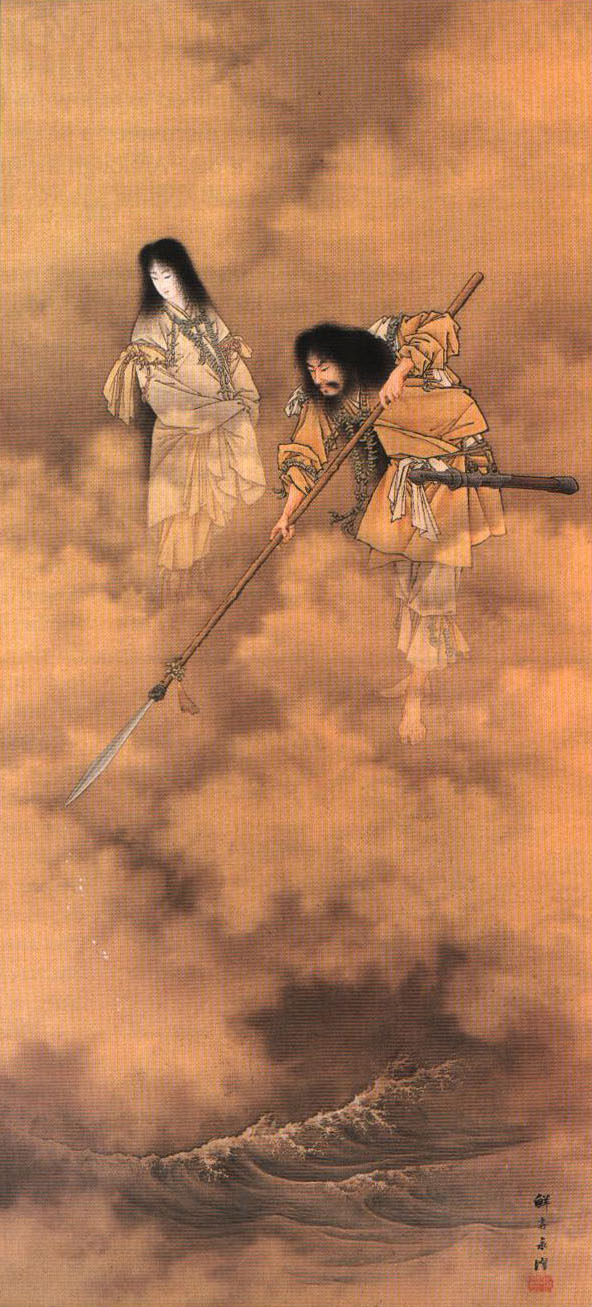
Aya Nishitani incorporated both Buddhist and Shinto elements into Digital Devil Story, including making the Shinto deities Izanagi and Izanami (pictured) key characters.

The concept for Digital Devil Story came to Aya Nishitani when he was working at Toshiba as a programmer in 1979, where he worked with one of the earliest online networks; while needing to use computers, he disliked how they were automating the work process. Already having an interest in the occult and with demon summoning being prominent in fiction of the time, Nishitani came up with the idea of a demon being summoned and controlled like an artificial intelligence. He wrote a science fiction short story based on this premise, which was first published in the December 1985 issue Softbank's Oh!PC magazine under the title "Majutsu". (Note: 魔術; lit. "Witchcraft")

The short story was seen by Toshio Suzuki, then editor-in-chief at Tokuma Shoten, who contacted Nishitani and asked him to expand it into a full-length novel. Nishitani was aware of the potentially controversial content, and attributed Suzuki's drive and support for getting the project to publication. When asked to come up with titles, Nishitani produced several including Digital Devil Story and Megami Tensei; while the former was more favoured by Tokuma Shoten's editing staff, Suzuki insisted that Megami Tensei be included, becoming the first book's subtitle. The Megami Tensei title was in reference to the reincarnated Izanami, who was central to the narrative.

Nishitani described the core philosophy of the series as being based in Buddhism, incorporating its focus on reincarnation inspired by reading the stories of Shinran during school. His focus on the Shinto goddess Izanami was due to him being from a region of religious significance to her, influencing his portrayal of Izanagi as an "inadequate husband", and having a liking for weak main characters. Akemi's death in the third book caused concern at the publisher when he showed the manuscript, but Suzuki defended it as a fitting end for the character. Nishitani also incorporated world mythology into the series; Loki was written as a demon in reference to how Norse deities were recast as demonic figures when the region converted to Christianity, while Set was portrayed as a serpent both as a reference to Yamata no Orochi and a homage to a deity from the Conan the Barbarian stories.

Nishitani's two main influences when writing the novels were Ryō Hanmura, known for "pulpy" novels with adult content, and occult elements from the work of H. P. Lovecraft. He described his writing style for the series as being aimed at a young audience, using early feedback from university students. As the series progressed, Nishitani noted that his relationship with Tokuma Shoten soured after Suzuki and others he knew left for other projects. After the second book's release, the new executive producer at Tokuma Shoten wanted him to change the story's focus to a male protagonist and drop the "Megami Tensei" title, which Nishitani refused to do.

The New Digital Devil Story sequel novels were written due to demand from fans of the original trilogy. Commenting on the difference in his writing between the 1980s and the 1990s, Nishitani said that publishers were asking for snappier writing in novels, contrasting against his original bulkier style. To adjust his style, he sought advice from literature teachers and students at two universities, and asked his wife to double-check his writing. Akemi's evolution across the series was a central theme; starting out as a flawed god, before going through different reincarnations to achieve perfection by the end of New Digital Devil Story.

The illustrations for the novels were done by Hiroyuki Kitazume, who alongside his illustration work had risen to fame as an animator and character designer for Mobile Suit Zeta Gundam (1985). Kitazumi was one of two artists proposed to Nishitani by Suzuki, and Nishitani was immediately impressed by Kitazumi's work. As the initial story was planned as a tragedy, Nishitani felt that Kitazumi's "beautiful" designs would soften the impact. For the original trilogy Kitazume designed the characters after the story was finished, while for New Digital Devil Story Nishitani collaborated with Kitazume on designs before completing the writing process. Kitazume would go onto collaborate with Nishitani on a number of other books.

== Publication ==
All the Digital Devil Story books were published by Tokuma Shoten's Animage Bunko imprint; the original trilogy released between 1986 and 1988, while New Digital Devil Story was released between 1990 and 1993. During the original trilogy's release, Tokuma Shoten failed to trademark the "Megami Tensei" title, causing Nishitani to lose the media rights relating to that name. After 2000, due to the rights issues and different companies handling related projects, Nishitani became detached from Digital Devil Story and did not speak much of it.

The original trilogy was re-published through the Megaten α mobile platform managed by Atlus during 2004. Fukken.com also began reissuing the series in 2005; the books were reissued in three volumes dubbed "Complete Editions", each containing three books in the series; the latest reissue came in 2012. For the second and third volumes covering New Digital Devil Story, new cover art was drawn by Kitazume. For each of these re-releases, Nishitani edited and updated the writing to be closer to what he felt was his own style. The series has not digitally republished as Nishitani felt the contents were too firmly grounded in the era when the books were written.

Up to 2026, the novel series has had no official English translations, but Nishitani stated he was discussing a release with an English-language publisher. In July 2026, Nishitani said that unspecified “contractual matters” were resolved regarding an English publication. While searching for an English publisher, he was publishing his own rough translations of the first book's chapters for a limited time. He admitted a lack of polish, but hoped they would allow translators to understand his Japanese.

Digital Devil Story	Release date	Source
Digital Devil Story: Megami Tensei (Note: デジタル・デビル・ストーリー 女神転生, Dejitaru Debiru Sutōrī: Megami Tensei; lit. Digital Devil Story: Reincarnation of the Goddess)	March 31, 1986	
Digital Devil Story 2: Mato no Senshi (Note: デジタル・デビル・ストーリー 2 魔都の戦士, Dejitaru Debiru Sutōrī Tsū: Mato no Senshi; lit. Digital Devil Story 2: Warrior of the Demon City)	October 31, 1986	
Digital Devil Story 3: Tensei no Shūen (Note: デジタル・デビル・ストーリー3 転生の終焉, Dejitaru Debiru Sutōrī Surī: Tensei no Shūen; lit. Digital Devil Story 3: Demise of the Reincarnation)	February 29, 1988	

New Digital Devil Story	Release date	Source
New Digital Devil Story: Toraware No Megami (Note: 新デジタル・デビル・ストーリー 捕われの女神, Shin Dejitaru Debiru Sutōrī: Toraware No Megami; lit. New Digital Devil Story: Imprisoned Goddess)	March 31, 1990	
New Digital Devil Story 2: Hyōkai no Joō (Note: 新デジタル・デビル・ストーリー2 氷界の女王, Shin Dejitaru Debiru Sutōrī Tsū: Hyōkai no Joō; lit. New Digital Devil Story 2: Queen of the Ice Fields)	February 28, 1991	
New Digital Devil Story 3: Jinma no Wakusei (Note: 新デジタル・デビル・ストーリー3 神魔の惑星, Shin Dejitaru Debiru Sutōrī Surī: Jinma no Wakusei; lit. New Digital Devil Story 3: Planet of the Devil)	August 31, 1991	
New Digital Devil Story 4: Ikari no Yōtei (Note: 新デジタル・デビル・ストーリー4 怒りの妖帝, Shin Dejitaru Debiru Sutōrī Fō: Ikari no Yōtei; lit. New Digital Devil Story 4: Wrath of the Young Emperor)	April 30, 1992	
New Digital Devil Story 5: Megami yo Eien ni (Note: 新デジタル・デビル・ストーリー5 女神よ永遠に, Shin Dejitaru Debiru Sutōrī Faibu: Megami yo Eien ni; lit. New Digital Devil Story 5: Eternal Goddess)	December 31, 1992	
New Digital Devil Story 6: Tensei no Kizuna (Note: 新デジタル・デビル・ストーリー6 転生の絆, Shin Dejitaru Debiru Sutōrī Shikkusu: Tensei no Kizuna; lit. New Digital Devil Story 6: Bonds of Reincarnation)	December 31, 1993	

== Media adaptations ==
During the 1980s to 1990s, Tokuma Shoten was well known for its multimedia expansion projects, and they followed this approach with Digital Devil Story. Planning for crossmedia expansions began in 1985, with Nishitani discussing it with three other producers. The first novel, Megami Tensei, was licensed out first for an original video animation (OVA), then for a video game adaptation based on the OVA.

=== OVA ===
The OVA was co-produced by J.C. Staff and Animate Film, co-produced by Hideo Ogata and Yutaka Takahashi, with Mizuho Nishikubo acting as the director and script writer. The characters were designed by Kitazume, while the music was composed by Usagi-gumi. A vocal theme song, "Lady Your Eyes", was performed by Youri With The Cash. The cast included Yū Mizushima as Akemi, Saeko Shimazu as Yumiko, and Hōchū Ōtsuka as Loki. Tokuma Shoten acted as publisher for the OVA in Japan, initially for VHS. It was reissued on DVD with Happinet as distributor. The OVA was licensed for release in the United Kingdom by Kiseki Films for VHS and DVD.

Nishitani recalled that the OVA had recoupled its budget from overseas sales, but believes his disagreements with Tokuma Shoten at the time led to the production of a second OVA being halted. In her 1997 book The Anime! Movie Guide, Anne McCarthy described the OVA as "disjointed, poorly structured and not very good." Justin Sevakis of Anime News Network also found the OVA disjointed and unenjoyable, feeling that people needed to know the novel to understand the story.

=== Video games ===
Producing a video game adaptation of Megami Tensei proved difficult due to its adult themes and content, with Nintendo originally turning the project down despite initial interest from its staff. Ultimately the project was picked up by Namco, who oversaw publishing and development of two versions; an action game primarily developed by Telenet Japan, and a role-playing game developed by Atlus. Nishitani was deeply involved in the Atlus version's planning. Both versions of the game, titled Digital Devil Story: Megami Tensei, were released in 1987.

Atlus's game was a commercial success, and the team were able to create a second game with more creative freedom. While mechanically similar, the team created an original story, although they included a reference to Akemi during the game's ending. The original story was written with Nishitani's permission. Digital Devil Story: Megami Tensei II was released in Japan in 1990.

== Reception and legacy ==
Nishitani remembered that the third Digital Devil Story book sold 30,000 copies, and as of 2008 the Digital Devil Story series as a whole has sold 800,000 copies. While exclusive to Japan, a dedicated online fan following has produced ongoing fan translations. Power Unlimited noted Digital Devil Story, and by extension its adaptations, as an example of fantastical cyberpunk fiction from its time period. In 2024, Toshin Kagami of RealSound described the first novel's story as simple despite its "outlandish premise", noting it as an early parallel of hostile internet-based forces influencing the real world both in fiction and reality. Also in 2024 in a retrospective on the derivative Megami Tensei franchise, Lucas Deruyter of IGN noted that Nishitani's original novels had become very obscure compared to the game franchise they spawned. While some series retrospectives mention the novels, the game franchise is given greater focus.

Due to Tokuma Shoten becoming disinterested in using the Megami Tensei name for further media projects, Atlus acquired the trademark for their use. After signing a contract with Nishitani to allow production of their own project, Atlus started development on Shin Megami Tensei (1992) for the Super Famicom. Shin Megami Tensei was a critical and commercial success, establishing Megami Tensei as Atlus's premier series both in Japan and internationally, spawning multiple sequels and spin-off series.
