= Hiroyuki Kitazume =

Japanese manga artist

- 北爪 宏幸
- Born: July 24, 1961 (age 64); Tokyo, Japan
- Occupations: Animator, manga artist, and illustrator

Hiroyuki Kitazume (北爪 宏幸, Kitazume Hiroyuki; born July 24, 1961 in Tokyo) is a Japanese animator, manga artist and illustrator. He is often noted for his work with anime studio Sunrise. Helen McCarthy in 500 Essential Anime Movies commented that he "shot to fame" in 1985 as an animation director on the Zeta Gundam TV series.

== Works ==
=== Anime television ===
- Aura Battler Dunbine (1983) - Animation Director (episodes 23, 33, 37, 42, 45, and 47)
- Heavy Metal L-Gaim (1984)- Animation Director (episodes 1, 5, 10, 15, 20, 23, 27, 30, and 37)
- Super Dimension Cavalry Southern Cross (1984) - Secondary Character Designer
- Mobile Suit Zeta Gundam (1985) - Animation Director (episodes 1, 6, 11, 15, 19, 23, 26, and 36)
- Mobile Suit Gundam ZZ (1986) - Character Designer; Animation Director (episodes 2, 32 and 47)

=== Original video animation (OVA) ===
- Digital Devil Story: Megami Tensei: Character Design
- Megazone 23: Key Animation (Part 2), Character Designer (Part 3)
- Robot Carnival: Director, Script, Character Design (Starlight Angel)
- Dragon Century: Animation Director and Character Designer
- Genesis Survivor Gaiarth: Screenplay, Original Concept, Character Design, Key Animation (ep. 1)
- Moldiver: Director, Original Concept, Character Design, Animation Director (ep. 6), Animation (OP/ED)
- Yamato 2520 Character Designer

=== Anime films ===
- Mobile Suit Gundam: Char's Counterattack: Character Design, Animation Director
