= Digital Devil Story: Megami Tensei =

1987 action RPG and dungeon crawler

- Famicom cover art
- Developers: Atlus (FC); Opera House (SFC)
- Publishers: Namco (FC); Atlus (SFC)
- Director: Kouji Okada
- Artist: Esaki Minoru
- Writers: Kazunari Suzuki; Aya Nishitani
- Composer: Tsukasa Masuko
- Series: Megami Tensei
- Platforms: Famicom, Super Famicom, mobile
- Release: Famicom; JP: September 11, 1987; Super Famicom; JP: March 31, 1995; Mobile; JP: February 26, 2004
- Genres: Role-playing, dungeon crawler
- Mode: Single-player

- Developer: Telenet Japan (Note: Development assistance by Atlus)
- Publisher: Telenet Japan
- Platforms: PC-8801mkII SR, MSX, X1/X1 Turbo, FM77AV
- Release: MSX, PC-8801mkII SR; JP: July 1987; X1/X1 Turbo; JP: August 1987; Fujitsu FM77AV; JP: September 1987
- Genre: Action role-playing
- Mode: Single-player

Digital Devil Story: Megami Tensei (Note: Dejitaru Debiru Sutōrī Megami Tensei (デジタル・デビル物語(ストーリー) 女神転生; lit. Digital Devil Story: Reincarnation of the Goddess)) refers to two distinct role-playing video games based on the Digital Devil Story trilogy of science fiction novels by Japanese author Aya Nishitani. One version was developed by Atlus and published by Namco in 1987 for the Famicom—Atlus would go on to create further games in the Megami Tensei franchise. A separate version for personal computers was developed and published by Telenet Japan with assistance from Atlus during the same year.

The story sees Japanese high school students Akemi Nakajima and Yumiko Shirasagi combat the forces of Lucifer, unleashed by a demon summoning program created by Nakajima. The gameplay features first-person dungeon crawling and turn-based battles or negotiation with demons in the Famicom version, and a journey through a hostile labyrinth as Nakajima featuring real-time combat in the Telenet version.

Development on both versions of the video game began as part of a multimedia expansion of Nishitani's book series. Nishitani was deeply involved with the design and scenario. The gameplay mechanics in Atlus' role-playing version of the game were based on the Wizardry series, but with an added demon negotiation system considered revolutionary for the time. Atlus and Telenet Japan worked on their projects simultaneously, playing against genre expectations for their respective platforms. The Famicom version proved the more popular with both critics and players, leading to the development of the 1990 Famicom sequel Digital Devil Story: Megami Tensei II. An enhanced port of both games for the Super Famicom was released in 1995.

== Gameplay ==
The player explores dungeons in a first-person view, and battles demons in the Famicom version.

The Famicom version of Digital Devil Story: Megami Tensei is a traditional role-playing video game in which the player takes control of a party composed of two humans and a number of demons. The party explores a large dungeon using a first-person perspective. The human characters use a variety of weapons and items, with the primary weapons being swords and guns. The items, which can range from healing items to different types of currency, are picked up from enemies or found in chests scattered through the dungeon. Weapons and accessories are purchased at different shops found within the dungeon. Progress is saved using a password system.

Battles are turn-based, with random encounters taking place while exploring dungeons. At the end of a successful battle, experience points, money, and items are obtained. Experience points are shared by Nakajima and Yumiko; by gaining enough experience points, their levels raise, and they are given one ability point each, which can be given to one of five character attributes: strength, intelligence, attack, dexterity, and luck. During battles, the player can try to persuade enemy demons to join them, in exchange for magnetite, money, or items. The player can keep seven demons at a time, of which up to four can be summoned at the same time; summoned demons aid the player in battles with physical and magic attacks, but cost money to summon, and consume magnetite as the player walks around. The demons' attitudes towards the player is governed by the moon phase, which cycles through eight phases from new to full. Demons do not level up; instead, the player can create stronger demons by visiting a special location and fusing two of their allied demons together into a new one.

The version for personal computers (PC) is an action role-playing game which plays from a top-down perspective. Controlling Nakajima, the player explores the labyrinthine levels of a dungeon populated by enemies. Combat plays out in real time, with Nakajima fighting demons using both short-range melee attacks and ranged magic attacks. Each section of the dungeon ends in a powerful boss encounter.

== Synopsis ==
The plot sees Akemi Nakajima, a clever high school student who is the reincarnation of the deity Izanagi, develop a computer program which summons demons from the realm of demons. Initially using his program to gain revenge on his tormentors, the program goes out of control and he unleashes a horde of demons. The demons are commanded by Lucifer, who resurrects the demonic gods Loki and Set following their defeat by Nakajima and Yumiko. With help from his girlfriend Yumiko Shirasagi, a transfer student that became interested in Nakajima and is the reincarnation of the goddess Izanami, Nakajima takes her into the demon world to help combat the demons. The pair travel into a vast subterranean labyrinth, where they defeat Lucifer's generals—the Minotaur, Loki, Medusa, Hecate, and Set—before fighting Lucifer himself and defeating him, closing the entrance to the demon world.

== Development ==
Digital Devil Story: Megami Tensei was adapted from Digital Devil Story, a trilogy of science fiction books written by Japanese author Aya Nishitani. Published by Tokuma Shoten, the novels were a major success in Japan. Nishitani and Tokuma Shoten began working to adapt the books into a multimedia series, beginning with an original video animation (OVA), which retold the events of the first novel, and creating a tie-in video game during the OVA's production. Initially pitched to Nintendo and turned down due to the book's mature elements, the game license was pitched to other publishers. The license to develop a game based on Nishitani's work was simultaneously acquired by two companies; Atlus who applied through Namco, and Telenet Japan. The two companies were willing to work on the same project, but wanted to differentiate their products. As the Famicom was noted for action-based titles and PCs for traditional role-playing games, the two companies decided to respectively play against platform expectations. Two different game projects were created with Tokuma Shoten's supervision under the Digital Devil Story: Megami Tensei title; Atlus created a traditional role-playing game which was published by Namco, while Telenet created (with assistance from Atlus) an action role-playing game, which it self-published. The two versions were developed concurrently, although the version by Telenet was the first to be completed.

The Atlus version was directed by Kouji Okada, while the scenario's original elements were written by Kazunari Suzuki. Sprite and promotional artwork was designed by Esaki Minoru, and the music was composed by Tsukasa Masuko. During the early phases, the gameplay concept was a near-copy of the gameplay style of the Wizardry series, attributed by Suzuki to their superiors being fans of the series. Suzuki insisted on the inclusion of some new feature which would distinguish it from Wizardry. This resulted in the creation of the demon negotiation system. Okada later stated that demon negotiation was decided upon from an early stage. Speaking later about the first-person exploration, Okada was highly critical, feeling that after all their efforts "All we had left after everything was said and done were lots and lots of long, winding dungeons!". Storage space on the cartridge was a recurring concern for the team, with Suzuki using unspecified programming tricks to include high-quality sprite graphics. Due to the rules of the gaming industry at the time, the teams and studios either went uncredited or had pseudonyms, with Masuko being credited as "Project Satan".

Nishitani was deeply involved in planning the game, contributing suggestions and advice for the project. According to Okada, a major issue during development was faithfully following the novel's plot due to the limited hardware space on the Famicom cartridge, together with the necessity of creating a compelling gameplay experience. With this in mind, the team picked out key parts the novel's plot to include in the game while cutting out non-essential elements. One element that was not included was the questionable morality of the main protagonist, which was a prominent feature in the novels. These cuts and changes were made with Nishitani's permission, which Okada attributed to the Telenet version already closely following the novel, giving Atlus more creative freedom. Suzuki later commented that it was only because they were working with Namco that the game was ever released, due to its mature character designs and heavy use of religion in the narrative. The Cerberus demon, which would become a recurring feature in later Megami Tensei games, was a homage to the narrative of Nishitani's trilogy, at the same time emulating the trend for games to have a marketable mascot or character.

== Release ==
The PC version of the game was published by Telenet Japan for the NEC PC-8801(mkIISR), MSX2, Sharp X1 and Fujitsu FM77AV models between July and September 1987. The PC88 version was re-released on April 25, 2006 by Kadokawa Shoten as part of a collection of fifteen games for the platform.

The Famicom version of Digital Devil Story: Megami Tensei was published by Namco on September 11, 1987. This version was later re-released through Atlus's dedicated mobile store; first for NTT DoCoMo mobile devices on February 26, 2004, then through the Vodafone live! service on December 1 of that year, and finally for BREW services on September 29, 2005. The mobile versions, while direct ports, featured graphical improvements, automatic mapping of dungeons and the ability to save anywhere in the game. The Famicom version was re-released as part of Namcot Collection volume 3 in October 2020 in Japan.

The game received an enhanced port for the Super Famicom by Japanese developer Opera House, combining the game with its sequel. For this version, the graphics were reworked, the gameplay adjusted, and the demon artwork redrawn by then-established series illustrator Kazuma Kaneko. The music was arranged by Hitoshi Sakimoto. Titled Kyuuyaku Megami Tensei, (Note: (旧約・女神転生; lit. The Old Testament: Reincarnation of the Goddess)) the port was released on March 31, 1995. This version was re-released on the Virtual Console for Wii on July 3, 2012.

No version of the game has been released outside Japan. This has been attributed to Nintendo's policy of censoring religious references in games, which rendered the early Megami Tensei titles unsuitable for localization due to their central religious elements. A fan translation of Kyuuyaku Megami Tensei was released on August 28, 2014.

== Reception ==
Reception

Review scores
Publication	Score
Famitsu	8/10, 8/10, 8/10, 7/10 (FC)
Famicom Hisshoubon	4/5, 4.5/5 (FC)

In its review, Famitsu compared the 3D dungeon exploration of the Atlus version to the Deep Dungeon series, with the critics giving praise to its gameplay and unusual setting. In an article about the game in 1991, Family Computer Magazine called it a "revolutionary RPG", praising its gameplay and atmosphere despite the design making it easy for players to get lost. Ohta Publishing magazine Continue cited its dark atmosphere and mechanics as both impressive given the limited hardware and innovative among role-playing games of the time. Kurt Kalata and Christopher J. Snelgrove of Hardcore Gaming 101 stated that it was "surprising how in depth the monster catching and fusing elements are given the game's age", praising its mechanics despite the age and high difficulty curve. In contrast to their praise for the Famicom version, they referred to Telenet Japan's version as a poor clone of Gauntlet with low-quality graphics. While no specific sales figures are available, Okada said that the game was a commercial success, allowing Atlus breathing room to consider where to next take the series.

The mixture of demon negotiation and recruitment with the traditional role-playing mechanics were considered revolutionary for the time. UGO Networks writer K. Thor Jensen cited the game as the first successful use of cyberpunk aesthetics in video games, saying that the series' mix of science fiction elements and the occult "create a truly unique fictional cyberpunk world". In a 2012 feature on influential games, Game Informer's Kimberley Wallace attributed Digital Devil Story: Megami Tensei with pioneering the monster collecting gameplay popularized by the Pokémon series. In a 2015 retrospective on the game's 1992 successor, Shin Megami Tensei, Touch Arcade's Shaun Musgrave noted the unusual game mechanics within its standardised role-playing formula, and its science fiction-inspired setting in contrast to the fantasy settings dominating the genre at the time.

== Legacy ==
Following the success of the game, Atlus decided to create a sequel, but instead of continuing to adapt Nishitani's work, they created an original story with an expanded narrative and refined gameplay. Titled Digital Devil Story: Megami Tensei II, the game was released for the Famicom in 1990. Digital Devil Story: Megami Tensei was the first game in the Megami Tensei series, with Atlus eventually buying the rights to the franchise and turning the series into their most famous intellectual property. Megami Tensei has been called the third most popular RPG series in Japan after Dragon Quest and Final Fantasy, and gone on to include multiple subseries and expansions into other media.

== See also ==
- Cosmic Soldier – a 1985 role-playing game that featured a dialog conversation system similar to the Atlus version's demon negotiation system
- List of Megami Tensei media
