= Nuzlocke =

Fan-created challenge for the Pokémon franchise

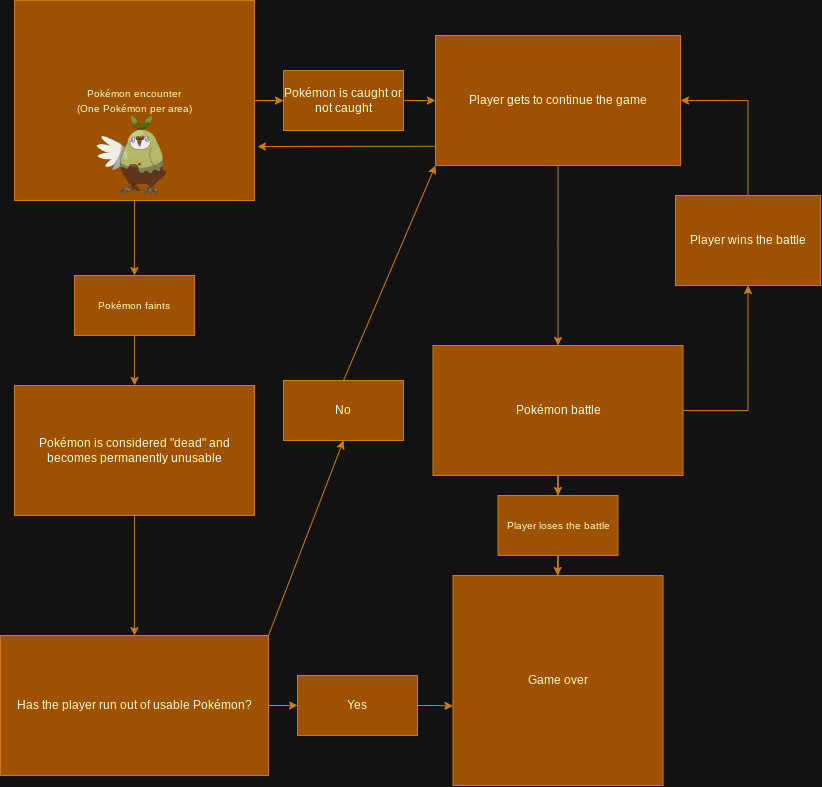
A diagram detailing the rules of the challenge

The Nuzlocke challenge run is a self-imposed fan-made gameplay formula designed to make video games in the Pokémon series more difficult. Players abiding by Nuzlocke rules are unable to use their Pokémon again if they are knocked out in combat once, and can only add the first Pokémon they encounter in a select area to their team.

It has proven popular with players due to its focus on building emotional attachments with obtained Pokémon, as well as for the added challenge it provides. The Nuzlocke challenge is also popular with content creators online, attracting wide following within the Pokémon fan community. Former Nintendo Minute hosts Kit Ellis and Krysta Yang, following their departure from the series, stated that they had been forbidden by The Pokémon Company from using Nuzlocke rules in a video. This resulted in fandom backlash, leading to the company making a statement clarifying that they do not take issue with fans or creators playing with Nuzlocke rules. The Nuzlocke challenge has been adapted into other video games since its introduction.

== History and gameplay ==
In the Pokémon series, players travel across a region, capturing the creatures (the side effect is filling up the Pokédex) to use in battles; they can use various moves both offensively and defensively. If a Pokémon takes enough damage, they will "faint" and render it unable to be used in combat. These Pokémon can be healed at Pokémon Centers, or by using healing items. The primary goal is to become the strongest trainer in the region.

Nuzlocke gameplay functions almost identically to regular gameplay, The initial ruleset is:

1. catch the first Pokémon they encounter in a given area
2. that when a Pokémon is defeated in battle, it is considered "dead" and cannot be used again, even if healed in-game.

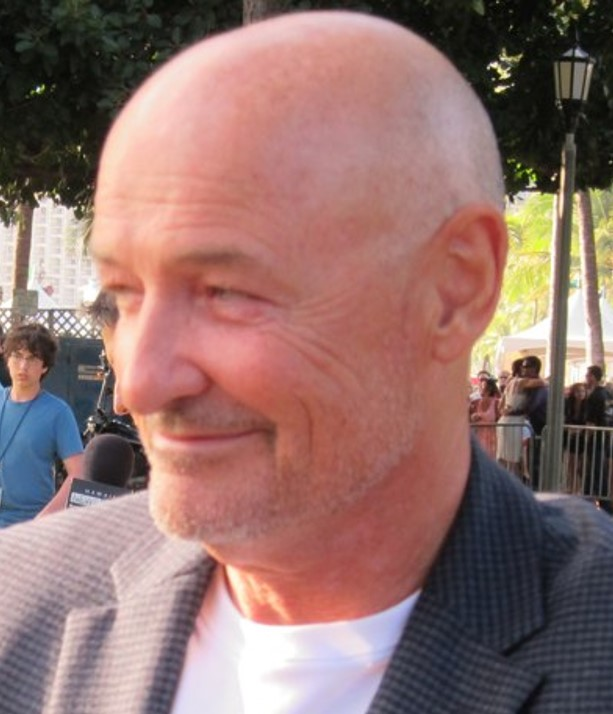
The Nuzlocke name came from a Nuzleaf depicted with the face of John Locke from the series Lost, who was portrayed by actor Terry O'Quinn (pictured).

Later, a third rule was universalized with it for the player to nickname their Pokémon to form a stronger attachment.

The Nuzlocke challenge was first created in 2010 by UC Santa Cruz student Nick Franco. Franco, procrastinating on college work, chose to play the Ruby version of Pokémon, adding additional rules to make the play session more interesting (the initial 2 only). Franco eventually turned the playthrough with the ruleset into a webcomic, dubbed Pokémon: Hard-Mode. A recurring Nuzleaf character, who was drawn to resemble Lost character John Locke, became the source of the formula's name, with the words "Nuzleaf" and "Locke" combined to coin "Nuzlocke".

As the series has progressed, games have become less compatible with the format, with games such as the 2nd Kanto remakes, which drastically changed the gameplay style, being nearly impossible to play with the standard formula. In a Destructoid interview, Franco stated the formula was made more difficult by additions to the games that make gameplay easier; additions included the affection level, which allowed Pokémon to survive hits that would otherwise KO them, and Pokémon spawning in the game's overworld instead of through random encounters, which used to limit the player's ability to select which Pokémon they would get. As a result of these changes, further additions to the ruleset were made to allow for the challenge's difficulty to remain.

Twitch streamer iateyourpie created another variant of the rules, dubbed the "Ironmon Challenge", which kept the basic Nuzlocke formula, but randomized Pokémon locations, item locations, and Pokémon moves using mods. It was devised to provide a challenge to those already familiar with the Nuzlocke ruleset, and was stated in official documentation as "...not meant to be fair, and possibly not even fun". More difficult kaizo challenges limit players to one Pokémon at a time. Other adaptations to the ruleset have been devised, such as the "Hatelocke", which creates one continual run spanning the whole series, barring players from using Pokémon they captured in previous games.

== Reception ==
Nuzlockes have proven popular with older fans as a way to mitigate the games' low difficulty. The limited rulesets make the defeat of a Pokémon more emotionally impactful to players than they would be otherwise; according to Vox, the Nuzlocke challenge revived the feeling of emotional connection players felt with their Pokémon when they were younger. The ruleset also encourages a stricter, more strategic gameplay, as it is substantially more difficult than it would be otherwise.

Nuzlockes became popular in the Pokémon fandom, primarily due to their higher difficulty and their focus on players bonding with their Pokémon. It is especially popular among content creators, who have cited it as being beneficial for garnering viewership and a sense of community; live streams of creators playing with the Nuzlocke ruleset frequently garner hundreds of thousands of viewers, with many raising money for charity.

Following their departure from the web-series Nintendo Minute, Kit Ellis and Krysta Yang, the series' former hosts, stated they had planned to do an episode featuring them playing a Pokémon game with Nuzlocke rules, only to be rebuked; according to them, they were not allowed to do so due to it being considered akin to playing a ROM hack on the platform. Yang alleged The Pokémon Company had previously removed content creators from their creator program due to them using Nuzlocke rules in playthroughs. This prompted backlash within the fandom, resulting in The Pokémon Company International writing a response, clarifying they have no issue with players using the ruleset.

The Nuzlocke format was later adapted in other video games. Coromon, an indie game inspired by the Pokémon series, included a game mode which allowed players to play the game using Nuzlocke rules. The game Temtem added several "challenge modes" in a post-release update, with one being inspired by and using the Nuzlocke rules. Other Pokémon fan games, such as Pokémon Insurgence and Pokémon Korosu, include Nuzlocke game modes, with the latter making it a mandatory gameplay feature.
