= List of Megami Tensei video games =

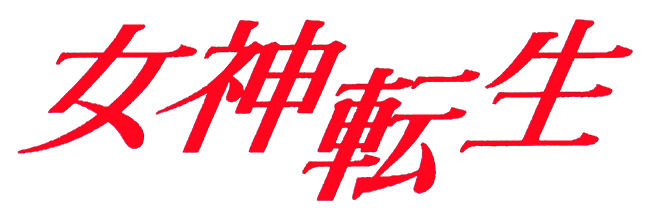
Top: Japanese Megami Tensei series logo
Bottom: Shin Megami Tensei logo used in several international releases

Megami Tensei is a series of role-playing video games (RPGs) primarily developed by Atlus. It began with 1987's Digital Devil Story: Megami Tensei, which is based on Aya Nishitani's novel of the same name, and has spawned a sequel and several sub-series, such as the Persona and Devil Summoner series. The original Digital Devil Story: Megami Tensei games and the Shin Megami Tensei sub-series form the core of the series, while other entries are considered spin-offs.

Early games have received infrequent releases outside Japan: the first title to be released in North America was 1995's Jack Bros., and the first Megami Tensei RPG released in the region was 1996's Revelations: Persona. The first game released in the PAL region was 2003's Shin Megami Tensei: Nocturne, which was released there in 2005. The series has several recurring themes, including demon-summoning, Japanese folklore, and the occult. Despite its thematic roots in Japanese culture and mythology, it has found a cult following internationally. It is Atlus's flagship role-playing game series, and one of the biggest in the genre in Japan. Several other types of media based on the series have been made, including anime and manga.

== Original series ==
Title	Original release date		
Title	Japan	North America	PAL region
Digital Devil Story: Megami Tensei	July 1987	none	none
Notes: Published by Telenet Japan for home computers.; Based on Aya Nishitani's novel of the same name.; An action role-playing game that plays from a top-down perspective.
Digital Devil Story: Megami Tensei	September 11, 1987	none	none
Notes: Published by Namco for Famicom; Based on Aya Nishitani's novel of the same name; An unofficial fan translation was released in 2018
Digital Devil Story: Megami Tensei II	April 6, 1990	none	none
Notes: Published by Namco for Famicom; An unofficial fan translation was released in 2022
Kyūyaku Megami Tensei	March 31, 1995	none	none
Notes: Published by Atlus for Super Famicom; A remake of the two Famicom games, released on a single cartridge; An unofficial fan translation was released in 2014

== Shin Megami Tensei ==
Title	Original release date		
Title	Japan	North America	PAL region
Shin Megami Tensei	October 30, 1992	March 18, 2014 (iOS)	March 18, 2014 (iOS)
Notes: Published by Atlus for Super Famicom, and later released for PC Engine CD-ROM (1993), Mega-CD (1994), PlayStation (2001), Game Boy Advance (2003), iOS (2012), and Android (2012); Remained exclusive to Japan until the iOS version was published in English in 2014
Shin Megami Tensei II	March 18, 1994	none	none
Notes: Published by Atlus for Super Famicom, and later released for PlayStation (2002), Game Boy Advance (2003), iOS (2012), and Android (2012)
Shin Megami Tensei If...	October 28, 1994	none	none
Notes: Published by Atlus for Super Famicom, and later released for PlayStation (2002), Microsoft Windows, and iOS (2013)
Shin Megami Tensei: Nine	December 5, 2002	none	none
Notes: Developed by Atlus and Nex Entertainment, and published by Atlus for Xbox; Intended to be an online game, but was split into an offline and an online version, of which only the former was released
Shin Megami Tensei III: Nocturne	February 20, 2003	October 12, 2004	July 1, 2005
Notes: Published by Atlus for PlayStation 2; Published by Ghostlight in Europe; Director's Cut Editions Maniax released in 2004, and Maniax Chronicle in 2008.; Remaster published in Japan in 2020 and North America/PAL Region in 2021; Known in Japan as Shin Megami Tensei III: Nocturne and in Europe as Shin Megami Tensei: Lucifer's Call
Shin Megami Tensei: Imagine	April 4, 2007	December 31, 2008	January 5, 2009
Notes: Developed by Cave and published by Atlus for Microsoft Windows, and later released for Macintosh computers; Initially published in the West by Aeria Games until 2012, and then by Atlus until the title was taken over by Marvelous USA in 2013; A free-to-play online game; Began as a port of Shin Megami Tensei: Nine; Closed down in 2014 in the West and in 2016 in Japan
Shin Megami Tensei: Strange Journey	October 8, 2009	March 23, 2010	May 18, 2018 (Nintendo 3DS)
Notes: Published by Atlus for Nintendo DS, and later rereleased for Nintendo 3DS in 2017 as Shin Megami Tensei: Deep Strange Journey in Japan, Shin Megami Tensei: Strange Journey Redux internationally; Published by Deep Silver in Europe
Shin Megami Tensei IV	May 23, 2013	July 16, 2013	October 30, 2014
Notes: Published by Atlus for Nintendo 3DS
Shin Megami Tensei IV: Apocalypse	February 10, 2016	September 20, 2016	December 2, 2016
Notes: Published by Atlus for Nintendo 3DS; Published by Deep Silver in Europe and Australia; Known in Japan as Shin Megami Tensei IV: Final
Shin Megami Tensei V	November 11, 2021	November 12, 2021	November 12, 2021
Notes: Developed by Atlus for Nintendo Switch; Developed using Unreal Engine 4; Expanded edition Shin Megami Tensei V: Vengeance released in 2024

== Last Bible ==
Title	Original release date		
Title	Japan	North America	PAL region
Revelations: The Demon Slayer	December 23, 1992	August 1999 (Game Boy Color)	none
Notes: Published by Atlus for Game Boy, and later released for Game Gear, and Game Boy Color; Known in Japan as Megami Tensei Gaiden: Last Bible
Megami Tensei Gaiden: Last Bible II	November 19, 1993	none	none
Notes: Published by Atlus for Game Boy, and later released for Game Boy Color
Last Bible III	March 4, 1995	none	none
Notes: Published by Atlus for Super Famicom
Another Bible	March 4, 1995	none	none
Notes: Published by Atlus for Game Boy, and later released for mobile phones
Megami Tensei Gaiden: Last Bible Special	March 24, 1995	none	none
Notes: Published by Sega for Game Gear

== Majin Tensei ==
Title	Original release date		
Title	Japan	North America	PAL region
Majin Tensei	January 28, 1994	none	none
Notes: Published by Atlus for Super Famicom; A strategy game
Majin Tensei II: Spiral Nemesis	February 19, 1995	none	none
Notes: Published by Atlus for Super Famicom; A strategy game
Ronde	October 30, 1997	none	none
Notes: Developed by Multimedia Intelligence Transfer and published by Atlus for Sega Saturn; A strategy game

== Devil Summoner ==
Title	Original release date		
Title	Japan	North America	PAL region
Shin Megami Tensei: Devil Summoner	December 25, 1995	none	none
Notes: Published by Atlus for Sega Saturn, and later released for PlayStation Portable
Devil Summoner: Soul Hackers	November 13, 1997	April 16, 2013 (Nintendo 3DS)	September 20, 2013 (Nintendo 3DS)
Notes: Published by Atlus for Sega Saturn, and later released for PlayStation and Nintendo 3DS
Devil Summoner: Raidou Kuzunoha vs. the Soulless Army	March 2, 2006	October 10, 2006	April 27, 2007
Notes: Published by Atlus for PlayStation 2; Published in Europe by Koei; An action role-playing game; Known in Japan as Devil Summoner: Kuzunoha Raidō tai Chōriki Heidan
Devil Summoner 2: Raidou Kuzunoha vs. King Abaddon	October 23, 2008	May 12, 2009	none
Notes: Published by Atlus for PlayStation 2; An action role-playing game; Known in Japan as Devil Summoner: Kuzunoha Raidō tai Abaddon Ō
Soul Hackers 2	August 25, 2022	August 26, 2022	August 26, 2022
Notes: Published by Atlus for PlayStation 4, PlayStation 5, Xbox One, Xbox Series X/S and Microsoft Windows
Raidou Remastered: The Mystery of the Soulless Army	June 19, 2025	June 19, 2025	June 19, 2025
Notes: Developed by Atlus and published by Sega (Atlus in Japan) for Nintendo Switch, Nintendo Switch 2, PlayStation 4, PlayStation 5, Windows, and Xbox Series X/S; A remaster of Devil Summoner: Raidou Kuzunoha vs. the Soulless Army with revamped visuals and an overhauled battle system

== Persona ==
Title	Original release date		
Title	Japan	North America	PAL region
Revelations: Persona	September 20, 1996	November 1996	August 11, 2010 (PlayStation Portable)
Notes: Published by Atlus for PlayStation, and later released for Microsoft Windows and PlayStation Portable; Known in Japan as Megami Ibunroku Persona
Persona 2: Innocent Sin	June 24, 1999	September 20, 2011 (PlayStation Portable)	November 4, 2011 (PlayStation Portable)
Notes: Published by Atlus for PlayStation, and later released for PlayStation Portable; Published in Europe by Ghostlight; Known in Japanese as Persona 2: Tsumi
Persona 2: Eternal Punishment	June 29, 2000	November 2000	none
Notes: Published by Atlus for PlayStation, and later released for PlayStation Portable; Known in Japanese as Persona 2: Batsu
Persona 3	July 13, 2006	August 14, 2007	February 29, 2008
Notes: Published by Atlus for PlayStation 2, and later released for PlayStation Portable in 2009, and Windows, Xbox One, Xbox Series X, PlayStation 4, and Nintendo Switch in 2023 as Persona 3 Portable; Published in Europe by Koei; Rereleased for PlayStation 2 in an updated version titled Persona 3 FES, which includes the new scenario "The Answer"
Persona 4	July 10, 2008	December 9, 2008	March 12, 2009
Notes: Published by Atlus for PlayStation 2, and later released for PlayStation Vita in 2012, Windows in 2020, and PlayStation 4, Xbox One, Xbox Series X, and Nintendo Switch in 2023 as Persona 4 Golden; Published in Europe by Square Enix for PlayStation 2 and by NIS America for PlayStation Vita
Persona 4 Arena	March 1, 2012	August 7, 2012	May 10, 2013
Notes: Published by Atlus as an arcade game, and later released for PlayStation 3 and Xbox 360; Published in Europe by Zen United; Known in Japan as Persona 4: The Ultimate in Mayonaka Arena; A fighting game with a visual novel story mode; The only PlayStation 3 game to be region-locked
Persona 4 Arena Ultimax	November 28, 2013	September 30, 2014	November 21, 2014
Notes: Published by Arc System Works as an arcade game, and later released by Atlus for PlayStation 3 and Xbox 360 in 2013, with a release for Windows, PlayStation 4, and Nintendo Switch in 2022; Published in Europe by Sega; Known in Japan as Persona 4: The Ultimax Ultra Suplex Hold; A fighting game with a visual novel story mode
Persona Q: Shadow of the Labyrinth	June 5, 2014	November 25, 2014	November 28, 2014
Notes: Published by Atlus for Nintendo 3DS; Published in Europe by NIS America
Persona 4: Dancing All Night	June 25, 2015	September 29, 2015	November 6, 2015
Notes: Published by Atlus for PlayStation Vita, and later released for PlayStation 4; Published in Europe by NIS America; A rhythm game
Persona 5	September 15, 2016	April 4, 2017	April 4, 2017
Notes: Published by Atlus for PlayStation 3 and PlayStation 4; Published in Europe by Deep Silver
Persona 3: Dancing in Moonlight	May 24, 2018	December 4, 2018	December 4, 2018
Notes: Published by Atlus for PlayStation 4 and PlayStation Vita; Known in Japan as Persona 3: Dancing Moon Night; A rhythm game
Persona 5: Dancing in Starlight	May 24, 2018	December 4, 2018	December 4, 2018
Notes: Published by Atlus for PlayStation 4 and PlayStation Vita; Known in Japan as Persona 5: Dancing Star Night; A rhythm game
Persona Q2: New Cinema Labyrinth	November 29, 2018	June 4, 2019	June 4, 2019
Notes: Published by Atlus for the Nintendo 3DS
Persona 5 Royal	October 31, 2019	March 31, 2020	March 31, 2020
Notes: Known in Japan as Persona 5 The Royal; Published by Atlus for PlayStation 4 in Japan; Published by Sega for PlayStation 4 in Europe; Re-released on Windows, PlayStation 5, Xbox One, Xbox Series X, and Nintendo Switch in 2022; A re-release of Persona 5 with added content and changes
Persona 5 Strikers	February 20, 2020	February 23, 2021	February 23, 2021
Notes: Known in Japan as Persona 5 Scramble: The Phantom Strikers; Published by Atlus for the Nintendo Switch, PlayStation 4, and Microsoft Windows
Persona 5 Tactica	November 17, 2023	November 17, 2023	November 17, 2023
Notes: Published by Sega in the Americas and Europe; Published by Atlus in Japan; Released on Playstation 4, Playstation 5, Xbox One, Xbox Series S/X, Microsoft Windows, and Nintendo Switch; First Persona game to be released simultaneously worldwide; A tactics game
Persona 3 Reload	February 2, 2024	February 2, 2024	February 2, 2024
Notes: A remake of the original Persona 3 with some content from future re-releases

== Devil Children ==
Title	Original release date		
Title	Japan	North America	PAL region
Shin Megami Tensei: Devil Children – Black Book and Red Book	November 17, 2000	none	none
Notes: Developed by Multimedia Intelligence Transfer and published by Atlus for Game Boy Color, and later released for PlayStation
Shin Megami Tensei: Devil Children – White Book	July 27, 2001	none	none
Notes: Developed by Multimedia Intelligence Transfer and published by Atlus for Game Boy Color
Shin Megami Tensei Trading Card: Card Summoner	July 27, 2001	none	none
Notes: Developed and published by Enterbrain for Game Boy Color; Not a video game adaptation of the Devil Children trading card game
DemiKids: Light Version and Dark Version	November 15, 2002	October 7, 2003	none
Notes: Developed by Multimedia Intelligence Transfer and published by Atlus for Game Boy Advance
Shin Megami Tensei: Devil Children – Puzzle de Call!	July 25, 2003	none	none
Notes: Developed by Multimedia Intelligence Transfer and published by Atlus for Game Boy Advance; A puzzle game based on the gameplay style of Atlus' Puzzle Boy
Shin Megami Tensei: Devil Children – Book of Fire and Book of Ice	September 12, 2003	none	none
Notes: Developed by Multimedia Intelligence Transfer and published by Atlus for Game Boy Advance
Shin Megami Tensei: Devil Children – Messiah Riser	November 4, 2004	none	none
Notes: Developed by Multimedia Intelligence Transfer and published by Atlus for Game Boy Advance; A real-time strategy game

== Mobile and browser spin-off games ==
Title	Developer	Release date	Ref.
Akuma Shōkan Program	Atlus	October 16, 2000	
Shin Megami Tensei J	Atlus	April 1, 2002	
Shin Megami Tensei: Devil Children – Appli de Call!	Atlus	April 28, 2003	
Shin Megami Tensei: 20XX	Atlus	August 26, 2004	
Shin Megami Tensei If... Hazama-hen	Atlus	May 26, 2004	
Shin Megami Tensei Pinball: Judgment	KAZe	October 5, 2006	
Megami Ibunroku Persona: Ikū no Tō-hen	Bbmf	December 1, 2006	
Digital Devil Saga: Avatar Tuner: A's Test Server	Interactive Brains	April 18, 2007	
Megami Tensei Chaining Soul: Persona 3	Bbmf	May 14, 2007	
Majin Tensei: Blind Thinker	Bbmf	July 11, 2007	
Megami Tensei QIX: Persona 3	Bbmf	July 19, 2007	
Devil Summoner: Soul Hackers – Intruder	Bbmf	August 30, 2007	
Shin Megami Tensei: Tokyo Requiem	Bbmf	April 2, 2007	
Shin Megami Tensei: Devil Colosseum 20XX	Bbmf	May 28, 2007	
Aegis: The First Mission	Bbmf	October 29, 2007	
Persona 3 éM	Interactive Brains	December 12, 2007	
Persona 2 Tsumi: Lost Memories	Bbmf	December 27, 2007	
Megami Tensei Gaiden: Last Bible New Testament	Bbmf	January 16, 2008	
Illust Puzzle Persona 3	Bbmf	March 3, 2008	
Majin Tensei: Blind Thinker II	Bbmf	March 24, 2008	
Persona 3: Broken Shadow	Bbmf	April 28, 2008	
Shin Megami Tensei II Gaiden: Ma To Houkai	Bbmf	May 12, 2008	
Onsen Nozokimi Daisakusen	Atlus	July 2, 2008	
Devil Summoner: Soul Hackers – New Generation	Bbmf	July 22, 2008	
Persona 2 Batsu: Infinity Mask	Bbmf	September 8, 2008	
Persona Mobile Online	Bbmf	March 16, 2009	
Megami Tensei Gaiden: Last Bible New Testament II	Bbmf	April 23, 2009	
Persona 3 Social	Index Corporation	August 17, 2010	
Megami Tensei Gaiden: Last Bible New Testament III	Bbmf	September 17, 2010	
Persona 3 Escape	Bbmf	November 19, 2010	
Persona 4 Colors	Bbmf	January 19, 2011	
Shin Megami Tensei: Devil Hunter Zero	Index Corporation	January 21, 2011	
Shin Megami Tensei: Devil Children	Index Corporation	July 13, 2011	
Persona 4: The Card Battle	Index Corporation	September 24, 2012	
Devil Survivor 2: The Extra World	Bbmf	April 9, 2013	
Shin Megami Tensei: Devil Collection	Index Corporation	August 8, 2013	
Hanate Wotagei! Rise no Dance Battle	Atlus	June 17, 2015	
Nanako to Odoro: Issho ni Pose!	Atlus	June 24, 2015	
Shin Megami Tensei: Liberation Dx2	Sega	January 22, 2018	

== Other games ==
Title	Original release date		
Title	Japan	North America	PAL region
Jack Bros.	September 29, 1995	October/November 1995	none
Notes: Published by Atlus for Virtual Boy; An action game; Known in Japan as Jack Brothers no Meiro de Hee-Ho!
Giten Megami Tensei: Tokyo Mokushiroku	1997	none	none
Notes: Published by ASCII Corporation for PC-98 and Microsoft Windows
Shin Megami Tensei: Digital Devil Saga	July 15, 2004	April 5, 2005	July 21, 2006
Notes: Published by Atlus for PlayStation 2; Published in Europe by Ghostlight; Known in Japan as Digital Devil Saga: Avatar Tuner
Shin Megami Tensei: Digital Devil Saga 2	January 27, 2005	October 3, 2005	February 16, 2007
Notes: Published by Atlus for PlayStation 2; Published in Europe by Ghostlight; Known in Japan as Digital Devil Saga: Avatar Tuner 2
Shin Megami Tensei: Devil Survivor	January 15, 2009	June 23, 2009	March 29, 2013 (Nintendo 3DS)
Notes: Published by Atlus for Nintendo DS, and later released for Nintendo 3DS as Shin Megami Tensei: Devil Survivor Overclocked; Published in the PAL region by Ghostlight; A strategy game; Known in Japan as Megami Ibunroku: Devil Survivor (Nintendo DS) and Devil Survivor: Over Clock (Nintendo 3DS)
Shin Megami Tensei: Devil Survivor 2	July 28, 2011	February 28, 2012	October 15, 2013
Notes: Published by Atlus for Nintendo DS, and later released for Nintendo 3DS as Shin Megami Tensei: Devil Survivor 2 Record Breaker; Published in Europe by Ghostlight; A strategy game; Known in Japan as Devil Survivor 2 (Nintendo DS) and Devil Survivor 2: Break Record (Nintendo 3DS)
Tokyo Mirage Sessions ♯FE	December 26, 2015	June 24, 2016	June 24, 2016
Notes: Published by Nintendo for Wii U; A crossover between the Shin Megami Tensei and Fire Emblem series; Known in Japan as Genei Ibun Roku ♯FE
Shin Megami Tensei: Synchronicity Prologue	October 16, 2017	none	none
Developed by Team Ladybug and published by Atlus for Microsoft Windows; A Metroidvania game; Released for free through Atlus's website, and was available to download until December 24, 2017
