= Shin Megami Tensei: Devil Summoner =

1995 role-playing video game

- Sega Saturn cover art
- Developer: Atlus
- Publisher: Atlus
- Directors: Kouji Okada; Shogo Isogai (PSP)
- Producer: Katsura Hashino (PSP)
- Designers: Katsura Hashino; Shogo Isogai
- Artist: Kazuma Kaneko
- Writer: Ryutaro Ito
- Composers: Toshiko Tasaki; Tsukasa Masuko
- Series: Devil Summoner
- Platforms: Sega Saturn; PlayStation Portable
- Release: Sega Saturn; Original; JP: December 25, 1995; Akuma Zensho; JP: April 26, 1996; PlayStation Portable; JP: December 20, 2005
- Genre: Role-playing
- Mode: Single-player

Shin Megami Tensei: Devil Summoner (Note: Shin Megami Tensei: Devil Summoner (真・女神転生 デビルサマナー, Shin Megami Tensei Debiru Samanā; lit. True Goddess Reincarnation: Devil Summoner)) is a role-playing video game developed and published by Atlus. Forming part of the Megami Tensei franchise, it is the first title in the Devil Summoner series. It was first released for the Sega Saturn in December 1995, and received a port to the PlayStation Portable in December 2005. Despite reports of it being planned for localization, neither version has been released outside Japan.

Set in the city of Hirasaki in modern-day Japan, the story follows a college student whose death at the hands of demons forces his soul into the body of Summoner Kyouji Kuzunoha. Now in Kuzunoha's body, the protagonist must investigate the appearance of demons in the town and the activities of Sid Davis, the Dark Summoner responsible for killing the protagonist and Kuzunoha. The gameplay carries over multiple classic elements from the Megami Tensei series, including first-person dungeon navigation, turn-based battles, and negotiation with demons to recruit them into the player's party.

Devil Summoner began development after the positive reception of Shin Megami Tensei If.... Designed from the outset as a spin-off from the main Megami Tensei series, it drew on elements of detective fiction. It was also the series' first appearance on fifth-generation home consoles. Regular Megami Tensei staff were involved with the project, including director Kouji Okada, writer Ryutaro Ito, and character designer Kazuma Kaneko. The music was composed by Toshiko Tasaki and Tsukasa Masuko. Upon its release in Japan, the original version garnered positive reviews from Japanese press and strong sales. It went on to spawn both a television series and multiple sequels.

== Gameplay ==
A battle in Devil Summoner, featuring demons on the battle screen and the party displays.

Shin Megami Tensei: Devil Summoner is a role-playing video game in which the player takes control of a silent protagonist that can be named and whose personality is determined by dialogue choices made in the game. Navigation is split into two types: standard navigation through the game's three-dimensional (3D) dungeons in a first-person view, and navigation around the protagonist's home of Hirasaki City using a 3D overworld map. During dungeon navigation, the player's route is automatically mapped, and the map can be viewed in the menu screen. Non-playable characters (NPCs) are represented in first-person navigation with 2D sprites, and their speech is represented with head-and-shoulder portraits above dialogue boxes. Quests are available at a location called the House of Divination, which the player can choose to accept in exchange for rewards. Various stores are scattered throughout Hirasaki City for buying items, weapons and armor, and healing the player's party and reserves. A key currency in the game is Magnetite, which is used for summoning demons and as currency in some of the stores.

Enemies are confronted on the overworld map and in dungeons through both random encounters and staged battles. Battles are governed by a turn-based system: the player's and enemy's parties each get a turn during which they can perform available actions. The player party is arranged in a three-by-two grid, with their positioning effecting how they can attack enemies: for instance, short-ranged attacks are made less effective if the selected party member is in the back row. The player has access to multiple commands in battle: "Sword", "Gun", "Magic" and "Extra". Items can also be used in battle, and the player can choose to escape from most encounters aside from key boss battles. An "Auto" option is also available, where the entire party is commanded using the game's artificial intelligence. At the end of each successful battle, experience points are distributed among party members depending on the strength of the enemy, and the protagonist is given Ability Points to assign to six different attributes which affect his performance in battle.

Key elements in the game are negotiation with and the fusion and creation of demons. Encountered in battle, demons can be talked with and negotiated into running from the battle, giving money or items, or joining the player's party. If the negotiation fails, the demon will attack. Once a demon is won over, they are given a loyalty meter which is influenced by the player's actions. If the demon is treated well and performs actions in battle it approves of, its loyalty will increase. If the opposite occurs, the demon will begin to disobey the protagonist, then leave. Demons can be fused together at a special location in the game called the Hotel Goumaden, where fusions are supervised by the NPC Dr. Victor. Demon fusion is governed by a comparability system, with more favorable fusions emerging from better demon compatibility. Demons can also be fused with weapons to grant stat boosts, and after a certain point in the game artificial demons called Zomas can be used and strengthened through repeated fusions.

== Synopsis ==
Devil Summoner takes place in Hirasaki, a coastal Japanese city that has seen a recent rise in supernatural activity. The player character, an unnamed college student, is asked to accompany his girlfriend Kumiko Hatano to check out a book on the occult for her studies. Going to an amusement park to buy some concert tickets at Kumiko's request, the protagonist is attacked by demons and saved by Kyouji Kuzunoha, a Summoner belonging to an ancient clan dedicated to protecting Japan from supernatural threats. Shortly after leaving him, Kuzunoha dies under mysterious circumstances. Shortly after this, the protagonist is attacked by a Dark Summoner named Sid Davis. Killed by Davis, he is returned to the land of the living by Charon. Upon waking, the protagonist finds himself in the body of Kuzunoha, who was also killed by Davis. Now trapped in Kuzunoha's body, the protagonist is forced to work in his place to investigate the reasons behind Sid Davis' activities alongside Kuzunoha's partner Rei Reiho: he does this to both protect the city and return Kuzunoha and himself to their original bodies.

During his investigations, the protagonist and Rei learn of multiple demon-run criminal organizations causing chaos in Hirasaki including factions of the Yakuza, all of them connected to Davis. The protagonist's efforts against the demon threats are hindered by Hideo Momochi, who accuses the pair of being involved in the incidents until the police station is infested by demons and the police chief is revealed to be a demon in disguise. The protagonist also foils an attempt to Kumiko for unknown reasons. After taking down each of the five major demon factions, Davis reveals that the entire affair was orchestrated to break five seals holding prisoner the spirit of Inaruna: once a powerful regional priestess who was executed for resisting the forces of Emperor Jimmu with her magical powers during the unification of Japan, her spirit's hatred for her conquerors has grown beyond control and she will destroy the city if released. Kumiko, the reincarnation of Inaruna, is successfully abducted by Davis and used as a host for Inaruna's spirit. Although she is summoned, the protagonist and Rei rescue Kumiko and kill Davis. They then successfully defeat Inaruna. With the city returned to normal, the protagonist remains trapped in Kuzunoha's body, and can choose either to use his own name or adopt the Kuzunoha title.

== Development ==
Shin Megami Tensei: Devil Summoner is the first entry in the Devil Summoner series, which forms part of the larger Megami Tensei series: as with other entries, its narrative takes the form of a modern-day detective story as opposed to the series' more prevalent post-apocalyptic settings. The concept for Devil Summoner originated during the development of Shin Megami Tensei II and Shin Megami Tensei If... for the Super Famicom. During the development of II, series producer Kouji Okada considered creating a more imposing sequel, but instead created If... as a smaller-scale spin-off title. The positive reaction to If... gave Okada the freedom to realize long-held concepts for a "parallel world" as an extension of the original concept for If.... Odaka was the game's director, while the script was written by regular Megami Tensei writer Ryutaro Ito. The story and atmosphere drew on themes from detective fiction, particularly the melancholic and hardboiled fiction of Raymond Chandler. One of Ito's favorite pieces of dialogue was the opening segment, where the protagonist is dragged about by Kumiko on her errands, during which the protagonist's personality is determined by the player. The name of the game's setting, Hirasaki City, was constructed using kanji taken from the names of places in Kanagawa Prefecture. The city's name also served as a reference to Heijo City, a location in Patriotic Squadron Dai-Nippon.

Devil Summoner was the first Megami Tensei title to be released on a 32-bit fifth-generation home video game console, and the first Megami Tensei game to feature 3D graphics. The latter presented a new challenge for the development team: while they found adjusting to the new specifications a challenge, they also greatly enjoyed working with the Sega Saturn, the which was unlike anything previously experienced by the team. Among the design staff were Katsura Hashino, who focused on combat, and Shogo Isogai, who focused on coordination between gameplay events. The demon conversation system was conceived by Okada based on experiences with the multiple accents encountered in the Kansai region of Japan. Using this as a base, he created the response system to give demon negotiation a more realistic feeling than previous Megami Tensei games. It was also a means of equalizing the relationship between demons and the player party, which had previously been more akin to master and servant than equal partners. The Zoma demons, which could be freely tailored into different demon types, was created while the team was balancing out the game's difficulty. The gameplay difficulty, which by later standards would be considered quite high, was toned down from the difficulty of earlier Megami Tensei titles to appeal to a wider audience. This necessitated balancing a more forgiving difficulty with keeping traditional Megami Tensei gameplay elements.

The character designs were created by Kazuma Kaneko. In keeping with the "MegaTen Detective" theme, Kaneko emulated the genre's hard-boiled elements in his character designs. Kuzunoha's character design was inspired by the first animated version of Japanese character Lupin III, the main protagonists of Tantei Monogatari and Ace Ventura: Pet Detective, and the titular character from The Adventures of Ford Fairlane. Rei Reiho, who Kaneko later referred to as his favorite female character design, was created to be the main character's sidekick and consequently was portrayed as a strong character. Her appearance was influenced by Japanese model Kitaura Tomoe. Her choker necklace, which was hung with coins needed to cross the Sanzu River after death, was part of how Kaneko expressed the story's hard-boiled elements. The character Sid Davis was created as Ito wanted a black character in the game: the star mark on his forehead represented a pentagram, which resulted in him getting the production nickname "shooting star". The name of true antagonist Inaruna was influenced by Sumerian mythology. She was originally going to be Princess Takiyasha, the legendary daughter of Taira no Masakado: while the explicit details were changed, Inaruna's character was still influenced by the tales surrounding Takiyasha. Her reincarnation in the form of Kumiko was a conscious reference to the Megami Tensei series' titular concept of reincarnation. Kumiko's early portrayal was far gentler than she was in the final game: given a high-class background, she would come across as a Yamato nadeshiko. Supporting character Dr. Victor was based on the titular protagonist of Mary Shelley's novel Frankenstein. Future character designer Shigenori Soejima worked on the game a sprite designer. Devil Summoner would be his very first work within the Megami Tensei franchise.

The music was composed by Toshiko Tasaki and Tsukasa Masuko, with additional arrangements by Tasaki, Masuko, Taku Iwasaki, Hisaaki Takemori and Don McCow. In their commentary on the game's music, the two main composers noted that tracks such as "Conduct Record" and "Sid Davis" were composed quite quickly: the latter track was rewritten, but circumstances led to the original version being used in the final game. "Kuzunoha Detective Agency" was Tasaki's favorite composition. Several environmental tracks were themed after their respective locations. The theme for Dr. Victor's location, the Goumaden Hotel, made heavy use of the organ despite Toshiko's original decision against this. The theme for 3D dungeons was re-purposed during debugging into the "level up" theme. The normal battle theme was originally intended to be a sub-boss theme, while the first battle theme to be composed was the main boss theme. The boss battle theme used in the game is a toned-down version of Tsukasa's original version, which was too large for comfortable use within the game. The final boss theme was divided into two parts: in the first part, Tsukasa made the guitar solo "jerky", but brought it back to normal for the second half. The staff roll music was composed by Masuko with a strong guitar element. For some tracks, the team was restricted by the available disc space.

== Release ==
Devil Summoner was released by Atlus for the Sega Saturn on December 25, 1995. A supplementary release containing bonus material such as the ability to view the game's demon collection, titled Shin Megami Tensei: Devil Summoner - Akuma Zensho, was released on April 26, 1996. In 2005, it was announced that a port to the PlayStation Portable (PSP) was in development as part of the Devil Summoner subseries' tenth anniversary celebrations. The port included a demon compendium, adjustable difficulty levels, a save-anywhere option, adjustable screen ratio, and additional bosses and interface alterations for user convenience. Hashino and Isogai returned to the project, this time taking up the respective roles of producer and director. The port was decided upon when it was decided to begin development on the third Devil Summoner game so players who had missed the Saturn original could experience it again. An important element of the port was ensuring short loading times, an issue plaguing other PSP ports of the time. The port was released in Japan on December 20, 2005.

=== Localization efforts ===
In March 1996, it was reported that Devil Summoner was being localized for a North American release in June (per GameFan) or July (per GamePro) of that year. For unknown reasons, it remained exclusive to Japan. During the run-up towards its release, it was rumored that the PSP port would be picked for a western release in 2006. Ultimately, the port was not localized. It was speculated that the reason for its continuing exclusivity was that Sony had blocked a localization attempt due to a lack of new content. As part of staff interviews in 2006 relating to the third Devil Summoner game, Atlus confirmed that they had no plans to localize the title for the West, preferring to prioritize new entries in the franchise. It was also said that the "top-secret reasons" for this were unrelated to the game's content or censorship issues.

== Reception ==
Reception

Review scores
Publication	Score
Famitsu	9/10, 9/10, 9/10, 8/10 (SS); 30/40 (PSP)
Sega Saturn Magazine	24/30

In its first week of release, the Sega Saturn version of Devil Summoner sold 264,822 copies. As of 2000, it sold 498,230, becoming the 12th best-selling game for the system in Japan. In contrast, the PSP remake did not appear in the top 500 best-selling titles either for 2005 or 2006.

Famitsu gave the original version a positive reviews, with the four reviews giving it scores of 9, 9, 9, and 8 out of 10. SoftBank Creative's magazine publication Sega Saturn Magazine gave it a score of 24/30 points, with the three reviewers giving it respective scores of 8, 9 and 7 out of 10. In a feature on the game for GameFan, Casey Loe noted the game's "clean and crisp" 3D visuals, called the enemy design excellent, and thought the full-motion video sequences were the best to be found on the Saturn system. He ended by praising Atlus' plans for releasing a title so deep and mature for the Western market. Fellow gaming magazine GamePro also liked the visuals, and called it "sure to be a hit" based on screenshots. Another magazine, Game Players, wrote in a feature on upcoming role-playing game releases in North America that the premise and previewed gameplay showed it to be a promising title after its positive Japanese reception. Kurt Kalata and Christopher J. Snelgrove, writing for gaming website Hardcore Gaming 101, called the game decent despite its slow pacing, an unpolished look, and some aggravating aspects to the demon loyalty system. In a 2015 feature on recommended software produced for the Saturn, Dengeki Online highlighted Devil Summoner as one of the system's most notable games. The writer ranked it among the best early Megami Tensei titles despite its high difficulty.

Famitsu's writers expressed disappointment over how the PSP version's graphics and screen size had not been changed in comparison to the Sega Saturn version, and of how few adjustments had been made. Despite this, the reviewers positively noted the easier gameplay experience and praised the battle system. Kalata and Snelgrove appreciated the graphics used in the game's dungeons, which they found to be detailed and better-looking than ones in previous games in the series; they also appreciated the battle transitions. On the other hand, they found the graphics for the game's maps to be "not particularly impressive looking", and the graphics for the enemies to be lacking and "barely animated".

== Legacy ==
The commercial and critical success of Devil Summoner prompted the development of a second game in the subseries. Titled Devil Summoner: Soul Hackers, it was released for the Saturn in November 1997, and served as an indirect sequel. Two prequels for the PlayStation 2 were released, focusing on the adventures of Raidou Kuzunoha in 1930s Japan: Raidou Kuzunoha vs. the Soulless Army and Raidou Kuzunoha vs. King Abaddon. The third Devil Summoner was the first to be released outside Japan.

=== Related media ===
A live-action TV series adaptation of the first game, titled Shin Megami Tensei: Devil Summoner, was produced and aired in Japan. Originally only scheduled for one thirteen-episode season in 1997, popular demand prompted the production of a second season, which broadcast in 1998. The first series follows the plot of Devil Summoner, while the second season follows an original story. For their VHS release, the subtitle Bright Demon Advent was added. The series was reissued in Japan on DVD in 2005. Two novels based on the series written by Ryo Suzukaze were published by the Aspect Books imprint of Media Works in 1996. The characters and artwork of Devil Summoner were used for the mobile pinball game Shin Megami Tensei Pinball: Judgement, released in Japan on October 5, 2006.
