= Devil Summoner: Soul Hackers – Intruder =

2007 role-playing video game

- Title screen
- Developer: Bbmf
- Publisher: Bbmf
- Series: Devil Summoner
- Platform: Mobile phones
- Release: JP: August 30, 2007
- Genres: Strategy, role-playing
- Mode: Single-player

Devil Summoner: Soul Hackers – Intruder (Note: Devil Summoner: Soul Hackers – Intruder (Japanese: デビルサマナー ソウルハッカーズ Intruder, Hepburn: Debiru Samanā Sōru Hakkāzu Intorūdā)) is a strategy role-playing video game developed and published by Bbmf. It is a spin-off from Atlus's Devil Summoner series, which in turn is part of the larger Megami Tensei series. It was released for Japanese feature phones starting on August 30, 2007, through the Megaten Alpha mobile game distribution service.

The game is set half a year after the events of the 1997 game Devil Summoner: Soul Hackers, and follows the hacker group the Spookies and the demon Nemissa as they reunite in the now deserted high-technological city Amami. The gameplay alternates between adventure parts, where the player interacts with the characters, and battle parts, where they command digital demons in turn-based combat. The game was well received for its gameplay, which critics called fresh and deep, and for its setting and writing.

== Gameplay ==
The player commands demons, capturing tiles and fighting enemy demons.

Devil Summoner: Soul Hackers – Intruder is a strategy role-playing video game in which the player commands a group of digital demons. It is split into chapters, each consisting of two types of segments: adventure parts, where the player progresses through the story and interacts with characters, while making decisions that affect how the plot progresses; and battle parts, where the player and the computer-controlled opponent take turns commanding their demon units across a tile-based arena. Each battle has a set victory condition that the player must meet to progress in the game; conversely, the battle is lost if all friendly units are defeated.

Moving a demon unit uses up some electric power points; only a limited amount of points is replenished after each turn, requiring the player to plan when to spend them, as they cannot move units when they have run out of points. When a demon unit is adjacent to another demon, they can use magical or physical attacks against it; the type of attack is chosen randomly through a roulette wheel. The attack power increases based on how many tiles have been captured by the party the demon belongs to, which is done by stepping onto new tiles, painting them in the color of the capturing party. An already captured tile can only be captured by the other party through defeating the demon controlling it. The arenas have recovery tiles, which are the only methods of replenishing health, making them important areas to take control of.

The player builds up a larger party of demons throughout the game, and can improve it further by visiting Victor at Hotel Goumaden to fuse multiple demons into single, stronger ones. Demons have different levels of capacity, and each battle has an upper limit for the total amount of capacity of the demons brought into battle.

== Premise ==
Soul Hackers: Intruder is set half a year after the events of Devil Summoner: Soul Hackers's New Game Plus route. The hacker group the Spookies and the demon Nemissa reunite in the technologically advanced Amami City, which has been deserted and closed off from the public, and try to learn the identity of someone hiding there.

== Development and release ==
Soul Hackers: Intruder was developed and published by Bbmf, and released for various Japanese feature phones starting on August 30, 2007, through the Megaten Alpha mobile game distribution service. It was followed by another mobile Soul Hackers role-playing game by Bbmf, Devil Summoner: Soul Hackers – New Generation, on August 13, 2008.

== Reception ==
Soul Hackers: Intruder was well received by critics: Famitsu and GA Graphic both liked the change of genre from regular role-playing to strategy role-playing, finding that it made the game feel fresh to players who had already played the original Soul Hackers. The latter commended the gameplay for its depth, saying that it lived up to that of the original game, and Dengeki Online recommended it to fans of the Devil Summoner series. Gpara liked the roulette wheel function, saying that it added to the tension in the battles.

NLab appreciated the story's handling of the character Nemissa, and how it gives context for her re-appearance and why she looks the same as when she possessed Hitomi's body in the original Soul Hackers, contrasting this against her contextless inclusion as downloadable content in the 2022 game Soul Hackers 2. Famitsu liked the setting, and getting to return to it after the original game.
