= Devil Summoner: Raidou Kuzunoha vs. the Soulless Army =

2006 video game

- Developer: Atlus
- Publishers: JP/NA: Atlus; EU: Koei; AU: THQ
- Director: Kazuyuki Yamai
- Producer: Kozo Itagaki
- Programmer: Satoshi Ōyama
- Artists: Kazuma Kaneko; Eiji Ishida
- Writer: Shigeo Komori
- Composer: Shoji Meguro
- Series: Devil Summoner
- Platform: PlayStation 2
- Release: JP: March 2, 2006; NA: October 10, 2006; PAL: April 27, 2007
- Genre: Action role-playing
- Mode: Single-player

Devil Summoner: Raidou Kuzunoha vs. the Soulless Army (Note: Debiru Samanā: Kuzunoha Raidō tai Chōriki Heidan (Japanese: デビルサマナー 葛葉ライドウ対超力兵団)) is a 2006 action role-playing game developed and published by Atlus for the PlayStation 2. The game is the third in the Devil Summoner series, which is a sub-series of the larger Megami Tensei franchise. It was published by Koei in Europe and THQ in Australia. The game differs from the two previous Devil Summoner titles in having real-time battles and a named protagonist, and is first in the entire franchise to be set in the past – specifically the year 1931, the fictional twentieth year of the Taishō period of Japan. The story deals with historical figures such as Grigori Rasputin in addition to the Shin Megami Tensei series' traditional use of real-world mythological figures.

The game received positive reviews from critics, though its short length received criticism. In April 2014, the game was re-released on the PlayStation Store for PlayStation 3. A sequel, Devil Summoner 2: Raidou Kuzunoha vs. King Abaddon, was released in 2008. A remaster, Raidou Remastered: The Mystery of the Soulless Army, was released by Sega in 2025.

== Gameplay ==
Unlike previous Megami Tensei games which used turn-based battle systems, the battle system used in Devil Summoner is real-time. The player character, Raidou Kuzunoha, can attack with either his close range sword or his long range gun. He can also summon a demon from his collection to assist him in battle. Battles themselves take place in small enclosed "arenas" and can generally be escaped from, though this takes a random amount of time. Battles take place against a variety of demons that the player will encounter randomly while exploring the map, with different demons appearing depending on where the player is. The player can capture these demons after weakening them, and then summon them in battle to fight on their side. Devil Summoner also allows fusion between demons. However, the demons must have loyalty towards Raidou; to increase the Loyalty, they must fight together through many battles. A high level of loyalty unlocks also a combined attack with the sword or the gun. Aside from the basic "two-for-one" fusion, a demon can also be fused into Raidou's sword, thus making the weapon more powerful.

Outside of combat, the player is free to explore multiple areas of Taishō period Tokyo. Many real-life historical districts are represented here, like Tsukudo-cho, although usually under fictional names. The player can also travel the Shinoda Shrine (actually Hijiri Shrine) at Izumi, Osaka, which features prominently in the Kuzunoha legend of whom Raidou shares a surname.

== Plot ==
The game begins by introducing the player character, Raidou Kuzunoha XIV, a Japanese high school-aged detective who is also a 'Devil Summoner'. Raidou and his cat Gouto-Douji work at the Narumi Detective Agency headed by lead detective Shohei Narumi. Raidou is there under the orders of the Yatagarasu, a mysterious organization dedicated to protecting the future of Japan from otherworldly threats. As the assigned protector of the Capital, Tokyo, it is Raidou's job to dispel any demonic or otherworldly threats to the city. During a routine investigation for the Agency, Raidou and Narumi meet with their client, a young high school girl named Kaya Daidōji. She mysteriously requests for the pair to kill her, but before Raidou and Narumi can enquire further, soldiers in red armor and capes appear, kidnap Kaya, and fight off Raidou. Just as quickly as they appeared, the soldiers vanished, along with Kaya, leaving Raidou and Narumi stunned. Narumi believes it is their responsibility to track down Kaya's whereabouts and solve the mystery of her request, as the Agency technically accepted the case and it is obvious to the pair that something strange is afoot.

This course of action leads Raidou to search across Tokyo for clues, all while demonic appearances across the city increase in frequency. He investigates several notable locations, including Kaya's family mansion, a strange 'Dark World' version of Tokyo, where no humans reside and demons roam freely, as well as multiple military bases where it is clear the army is planning something big. The case also leads him to meet a variety of people in Tokyo, including Tae Asakura, a local journalist, and friend of Narumi. He helps her get a breakthrough in a case of a demonic murder spree, and frequently helps Raidou by providing him with information. He also meets the historical figure Grigori Rasputin, although he should be dead by this point in time. The two form somewhat of a rivalry throughout the game, as they're both powerful Devil Summoners. He is a recurring character in the story, and also makes appearances in the sequel, Devil Summoner 2: Raidou Kuzunoha vs. King Abaddon.

Overall, the story follows Raidou through his investigation as he scours all of Tokyo for clues while meeting various important people in the city and uncovering something greater than either Raidou or Narumi could ever have suspected.

== Development ==
Raidou Kuzunoha vs. the Soulless Army is the third entry in the Devil Summoner series, which forms part of the larger Megami Tensei series developed and published by Atlus: as with other entries, its narrative takes the form of a modern-day detective story as opposed to the series' more prevalent post-apocalyptic settings. The concept for Raidou Kuzunoha vs. the Soulless Army began in 2003, coming to producer Kazuyuki Yamai while he was feeling under pressure during the creation of the Maniax edition for Shin Megami Tensei III: Nocturne. After the release and positive reception, the development team decided to move on to a project that would offer new challenges. During these discussions, multiple team members voiced their wish to create a new Devil Summoner. The initial concept was for a small-scale, low-budgeted title for a portable system, which many felt fitted with the themes and gameplay mechanics of Devil Summoner. As the scale of their ideas increased, using a portable gaming device became impractical, and so they expanded the narrative to fit their grander vision. One of the hardest parts of gameplay to perfecting the new systems, which required a lot of trial and error and multiple redrafts to the game's proposed elements. The biggest change from previous Megami Tensei titles was that demons were visibly following the player around environments. The variety of demons, which took in multiple world mythologies, also fitted in with the game's chosen setting. The music was composed by Shoji Meguro, a regular composer and sound director for the Megami Tensei series. Unlike many of his previous compositions, Meguro made heavy use of wind instrumentation and a jazzy accompaniment in tune with the game's setting. For his inspiration, Meguro drew on the soundtracks created for procedural crime dramas on television. For battle themes, he continued to use his signature guitar-heavy "MegaTen sound". Meguro also handled the recording of vocal effects for the demons. Despite being little more than odd sounds and gibberish, the sounds were recorded with professional voice actors.

The basic concept for the story as visualized by Yamai was for a modern detective drama, which fitted in with the previous games' detective story style. Unlike other entries in the Megami Tensei series, which were set in modern Japan, Raidou Kuzunoha vs. the Soulless Army was set during a fictionalized version of the Taishō period. This time period was chosen as it fitted in with the themes of coexistence the game contained as it was a period where Eastern and Western culture were in a state of uneasy coexistence. How the city's residents adapted to or resisted these changes became one of the game's narrative themes. To properly convey the period and style, the team mixed Western Art Deco buildings with city districts still using extensive architecture from the late Edo period. Pre-rendered backgrounds were used by the developers over real-time ones as they wanted a high amount of detail and ease of experience with gameplay. The game's background graphic designer Masayuki Doi did extensive research into the time period to ensure the city was as faithful as possible, although later he added buildings not present at the time due to the setting's fictionalization. Another reason for the use of pre-rendered backgrounds was that polygon-rendered backgrounds would have needed too much power. The possible use of the Taishō period as a setting originally came from discussions during the development of Devil Summoner: Soul Hackers. The Soulless Army, or in Japanese the "Super-Powered Army Corps", came about from Yamai's speculative thinking into how Japan would create supersoldiers using then-existing technology with the aim of global expansion, a sentiment dominant in Japan at the time. Their red cloaks were influenced by the urban legend of the Aka Manto.

Kazuma Kaneko, the game's character designer, wanted an exhilarating title to counter the general mood of the time, which seemed quite bleak with subjects such as declining birth rates and economy in Japan dominating the news. The main theme of the game is "passion", denoting the main protagonist's drive to protect the city from demon attacks. The character of Raidou Kuzunoha had been in Kaneko's mind since he had worked on the original Devil Summoner ten years before. When he produced the character fully formed for Yamai during a difficult period in story development, Yamai was quite relieved. The concept behind his character was a positive image that would contrast with the dark setting and storyline. The character's given name being an inherited title rather than his true name was influenced by the Shūmei ceremony from kabuki theater. The summoning tubes used by Kuzunoha were based on legends of the kuda-gitsune, a spirit that lived inside bamboo sticks. Shōhei Narumi, whose profession as private detective was still little-acknowledge at the time, was created to offer an adult perspective on events. Tae Asakura was created as Kaneko felt women of the era were somewhat neglected. Her pen name "Kichō" was inspired by Raicho Hiratsuka, a famous Japanese women's activist. They also wanted a writer-type character who could investigate the city's supernatural phenomena from a writer's perspective equivalent to the noted folklore writer Kunio Yanagita. For the character designs for the game, the team tried to stay as true as possible to clothing of the time: for instance, Kuzunoha's outfit was based on the typical Japanese male high school uniform of the time. Many of the demons used in the game were carried over from previous games for the PlayStation 2 console, but they were given revamped textures so they looked distinct from their earlier counterparts.

=== Release ===
Raidou Kuzunoha vs. the Soulless Army was first revealed in July 2005 in an issue of Famitsu under the provisional title Devil Summoner: Raidou Kuzunoha. The game's choice of subtitle styling was so that the Raidou Kuzunoha games could be distinguished from the rest of the Devil Summoner series. It was also a reference to and emulation of the novels of Japanese author Edogawa Ranpo. It was first shown off in the West at the 2006 Electronic Entertainment Expo. The game's localization was handled by Atlus USA, and led by regular project leader Yu Namba. As with previous localization works, the team stayed as close as possible to the original text, although some adjustments needed to be made such as a Japanese song being changed to a more recognisable English one, and the removal of a mahjong minigame due to the total lack of a tutorial and its minor player benefits. Something unique to the localized version was the incorporation of 1920s slang into character dialogue. In Europe, the game was published by Koei. The two Raidou Kuzunoha titles received limited reprints in 2012 to commemorate the release of the 3DS port of Devil Summoner: Soul Hackers and give new players a chance to experience earlier entries in the Devil Summoner series. It was explained at the time that their release on PlayStation Network (PSN) was being delayed due to the software the Devil Summoner games were created for being incompatible with the then-current version of PSN. Raidou Kuzunoha vs. the Soulless Army eventually released on PSN on April 1, 2014. Costumes for the Phantom Thieves of Hearts inspired by Raidou are present in Persona 5, but were removed in the 2022 re-release of Persona 5 Royal; the original 2019 PlayStation 4 release retains them.

A remaster, Raidou Remastered: The Mystery of the Soulless Army, was announced in March 2025 and was released for Nintendo Switch, Nintendo Switch 2, PlayStation 4, PlayStation 5, Windows, and Xbox Series X/S on June 19, 2025.

== Reception ==
Reception

Aggregate score
Aggregator	Score
Metacritic	74/100

Review score
Publication	Score
IGN	7.2/10

Reception towards the game was mixed-to-positive. On the review aggregator website Metacritic, the game holds a score of 74 out of a 100, indicating 'mixed or average' reviews.

GameSpot rated it 7.3 out of 10, stating that it "definitely delivers on the unique storyline front, serving up a dark narrative filled with a variety of personable and powerful demons to recruit, control, and fuse" whilst noting that it was "not as polished as previous games in the series.". IGN UK rated it 7.2 out of 10, criticizing the visual, referring to them as "rather unappealing, and the lack of a strong plot to begin with could easily turn some people away;" however, he did praise the use of multiple demons within the historical Japanese setting.
