= Majin Tensei =

Video game spinoff series

- Cover art for the first Majin Tensei game
- Genre: Strategy
- Developers: Atlus, Multimedia Intelligence Transfer, Bbmf Corporation
- Publisher: Atlus
- Composers: Hidehito Aoki; Misaki Okibe
- Platforms: Super Famicom, Sega Saturn, mobile phones
- First release: Majin Tensei; January 28, 1994
- Latest release: Majin Tensei: Blind Thinker II; March 24, 2008
- Parent series: Megami Tensei

Majin Tensei (Note: Majin Tensei (魔神転生; lit. "Demon God Reincarnation")) is a series of strategy video games published by Atlus. It is a spin-off from Atlus' Megami Tensei franchise, and began with 1994's Majin Tensei. Since then, four further titles have been released: Majin Tensei II: Spiral Nemesis (1995), Ronde (1997), Majin Tensei: Blind Thinker (2007) and Majin Tensei: Blind Thinker II (2008). The player navigates a field seen from a top-down or three-quarters perspective as a human character, and battles demons; they can also recruit demons, and fuse multiple allied demons to create new, stronger demons.

The various titles have been developed by Atlus, Multimedia Intelligence Transfer and Bbmf Corporation, and feature music by Hidehito Aoki and Misaki Okibe. Aoki made use of ambient music, while also incorporating other elements into the compositions, including funk and synthesized piano. Soundtrack albums for the first two games were published by Pony Canyon, and a Majin Tensei manga was published by Enix. The series' gameplay, visuals and music have all been well received by critics, with particular praise to the demon fusion, the large character art and backgrounds for the battle scenes, and the use of ambient music. An exception was Ronde, which was heavily criticized, particularly for its visuals.

== Games ==
- Majin Tensei was released on January 28, 1994 for the Super Famicom. It was re-released through the Nintendo Power flash memory service on December 1, 1997, and digitally through the Virtual Console service for Wii and Wii U on September 6, 2011 and July 15, 2015. It is set in a Japanese city that has been invaded by demons, and focuses on gameplay rather than plot; the player takes the role of the Hero, and joins forces with the Heroine.
- Majin Tensei II: Spiral Nemesis (Note: Majin Tensei II: Spiral Nemesis (魔神転生II SPIRAL NEMESIS; lit. "Demon God Reincarnation II: Spiral Nemesis")) was released on February 19, 1995 for the Super Famicom. It was re-released through the Nintendo Power service on December 1, 1997, and through Virtual Console for Wii and Wii U on December 13, 2011 and June 1, 2016. It has a larger focus on narrative than the first game, and is set in Tokyo following a demon invasion. Naoki Takauchi defends the city with his friends, but has to reunite them after their base of operations gets invaded; he is aided in this by a young girl named Aya.
- Ronde (Note: Ronde (RONDE －輪舞曲－)) was released on October 30, 1997 for the Sega Saturn. It is set in the near future, and follows Asuka, Satoshi, Keita, Sakurako, and Charlie, who try to save Asuka's younger brother after he has been kidnapped by a living statue of Moloch in a demon museum.
- Majin Tensei: Blind Thinker (Note: Majin Tensei: Blind Thinker (魔神転生 Blind Thinker; lit. "Demon God Reincarnation: Blind Thinker")) was released on July 11, 2007 for mobile phones. It is set in Neo Tokyo in the year "20XX", where a project to develop new energy technology is underway, and follows the Hero and a man who accompanies him.
- Majin Tensei: Blind Thinker II (Note: Majin Tensei: Blind Thinker II (魔神転生 Blind Thinker II; lit. "Demon God Reincarnation: Blind Thinker II")) was released on March 24, 2008 for mobile phones. It is set in Tokyo, and follows Takeru and the artificially created demon Zora.

== Gameplay ==
Field navigation in Majin Tensei

Combat in Majin Tensei II

The player navigates the field (left), and switches to scenes with larger character art when engaging in battle with adjacent foes (right).

The Majin Tensei titles are strategy games in which the player takes the role of a human character who battles against demons. They navigate a field – seen in a top-down perspective in Majin Tensei and in a three-quarters perspective starting in Majin Tensei II – with characters represented by small, stick figure-like sprites, and switch to scenes with large, detailed characters when engaging in battle; in the first Majin Tensei, only the opponent is shown in battle scenes, while Majin Tensei II uses a split-screen presentation to show both sides. Ronde is an exception, and instead uses 3D graphics with a scrolling camera. On the field, the player can access pools that regenerate their energy, and starting in Majin Tensei II, they can use the terrain to gain an advantage in battles, increasing their defense rating. The player can also use items, which are bought using money they earn from battles. To attack enemies or support allies, the player needs to move their units on the field so that they are adjacent to the target of the action.

In addition to fighting, the player can choose to talk to demons encountered on the field, and attempt to recruit them to their party; the success of this depends on the player's level, with more powerful demons only being recruitable if the player's level is sufficiently high. In Ronde, the player does not initiate these conversations themselves, however: instead, defeated demons sometimes choose to talk to the player, and sometimes decide to join their party. Like in other Megami Tensei games, the player can fuse multiple allied demons with each other, thereby creating more powerful demons. In Ronde, the player can form contracts with demons, allowing human characters to use demon magic. Demons are fueled by magnetite, so the player needs to manage the supply of this, and thus cannot have too many allied demons on the field at once or take too long to finish a battle. By clearing battles, the player can advance to the next chapter. The games' stories are affected by player choices, and have multiple endings.

== Development ==
The first two games were developed by Atlus, while Ronde was handled by Multimedia Intelligence Transfer, and the Blind Thinker titles by Bbmf Corporation. All the games were published by Atlus in Japan; none of them have been released in English, but the user interface of Majin Tensei II is in English rather than Japanese, and English fan translations of the first two games were released in 2019 and 2018, respectively.

Rather than the Megami Tensei series regular Tsukasa Masuko, the soundtracks for the first two games were composed by Hidehito Aoki; he composed the Majin Tensei music on his own, and cooperated with Misaki Okibe on Majin Tensei II. He made use of ambient music, while also incorporating elements of funk, electronic distortion and sound effects; for the second game, he also introduced a focus on synthesized piano in the compositions. Music albums featuring the first two games' original soundtracks, along with new arrangements, were released by Pony Canyon: Majin Tensei Excellence Sound Collection was published on March 18, 1994, and Majin Tensei II: Spiral Nemesis Excellence Sound Collection on May 19, 1995. A manga by Shinshū Ueda, Majin Tensei: The True Remembrance, (Note: Majin Tensei: The True Remembrance (魔神転生THE TRUE REMEMBRANCE)) was published by Enix in five volumes.

== Reception ==
The gameplay, which several publications found similar to the Fire Emblem series, was well received, with multiple Famitsu reviewers commenting on how enjoyable they found the demon fusion. Kurt Kalata and Christopher J. Snelgrove of Hardcore Gaming 101 called Majin Tensei an interesting take on the genre, and worth playing; they said that while many players prefer Majin Tensei II, they enjoyed the first one more, but still found the second game decent; one change between the two that they liked was the larger focus on narrative, compared to the first game's focus on combat. They were highly critical of Ronde, labeling it a kusoge ("shit game"); they said that it was not "completely terrible", but that it felt like "a poor man's Shining Force III".

Kalata and Snelgrove criticized the first two games' field graphics for being small and only featuring little animation, while praising the battle graphics, noting their size, level of detail and high-quality backgrounds, and calling them superior to their counterparts in all other Super Famicom Megami Tensei games. They did however think that the battles in Majin Tensei II were visually a step down in quality. They criticized Ronde's visuals, saying that it was among the worst looking games from the 32-bit era, with characters looking like "blobs of discolored pixels", jerky camera movements, and slow-loading and visually unpleasing battles, and called the game "a total affront to the senses". RPGFan's Patrick Gann thought that the first Majin Tensei's music was weaker than Masuko's compositions, as well as Aoki's later compositions for the Megami Tensei spin-off series Persona, but still well done; in contrast, he called Majin Tensei II's music a pinnacle for the Super Famicom titles in the series, but still criticized its heavy use of synth. Kalata and Snelgrove enjoyed the "moody synth soundtrack" and opening of Majin Tensei II, while calling Ronde's soundtrack mediocre. Chris Greening at VGMO called Majin Tensei "one of the most individualistic and accomplished ambient scores on the Super Nintendo", enjoying the mix of conventional ambiance and funk, saying that it both enhanced the game's mood and worked as stand-alone music. On the other hand, he found Majin Tensei II's soundtrack "pleasant but disappointing", saying that several of the compositions were underdeveloped, uninspired or repetitive, while noting more developed tracks such as "A.D. 1995 Story" as highlights.
