= Shin Megami Tensei J =

2002 role-playing video game

- Title screen
- Developer: Atlus
- Publisher: Atlus
- Series: Megami Tensei
- Platform: Mobile phones
- Release: JP: April 1, 2002
- Genre: Role-playing
- Modes: Single-player, multiplayer

Shin Megami Tensei J, (Note: Shin Megami Tensei J (Japanese: 真・女神転生-J; "True Goddess Reincarnation J")) also released as Shin Megami Tensei EZ, (Note: Shin Megami Tensei EZ (真・女神転生-EZ; "True Goddess Reincarnation EZ")) was a role-playing video game developed and published by Atlus. It is part of the Megami Tensei series, and was released for Japanese feature phones starting on April 1, 2002, through a monthly subscription.

Players would explore three dungeons in 3D, where they could fight demons, aided by a demon guardian summoned into their character's body, and search for treasure; there also existed a multiplayer mode, where players across Japan could battle each other one-on-one. The game was well received for the replay value of the randomly generated dungeons and for the amount of player options.

== Gameplay ==
Players could explore three randomly generated 3D dungeons and fight demons encountered there.

Shin Megami Tensei J was a 3D dungeon-crawling role-playing video game, which consisted of two types of segments that players could alternate between: in the preparation segments, players could learn new magic and skills, and buy and sell items and equipment. In the exploration segments, they could navigate three dungeons in first person in the demon world, whose randomly generated layouts would shift each time they were entered: the World of Gluttony, the World of Envy, and the World of Sloth.

Players would search the dungeons for treasure chests containing items and equipment, with the goal of reaching the lowest floor and capturing each area; as they moved across tiles, a map would gradually automatically fill out to show the layout of the areas they had visited. Throughout the dungeons, they would encounter recovery springs where they could restore their health. Players could also re-enter already completed dungeons to replay them as they wish. While exploring, players would encounter enemy demons, which they fought in a turn-based battle system.

Players could summon guardian demons into their character's body to help them in battle: they accessed one when first starting the game, after having chosen of the three alignments law, neutral, or chaos. New and stronger guardian demons could be summoned through the use of guardian cards found in the dungeons; the guardian demons could also be improved through battling, which would earn them experience points and raise their level.

In addition to the single-player dungeon exploration, players could have one-on-one guardian demon battles with others across Japan in the multiplayer battle arena mode, and compete to be the best in the country.

== Release and reception ==
Shin Megami Tensei J was developed and published by Atlus, and was released for Japanese feature phones starting on April 1, 2002, as part of the launch of their platform Atlus Web-J on J-Phone's service J-Sky Java, where it was available as a monthly subscription; users could also access Megami Tensei wallpapers and music through the platform. This version of the game was split across two applications: the "basics app" (Note: "Basics app" (基本アプリ, kihon apuri)) for the preparation segments, and the "demon world app" (Note: "Demon world app" (魔界アプリ, makai apuri)) for the dungeon crawling, requiring the user to exit one application and launch the other to switch between the two parts of the game.

The game was updated to add the multiplayer battle arena mode on July 19, 2002, and on July 22, 2004, it was also released through their Atlus Web-EZ platform on KDDI's EZweb service, under the title Shin Megami Tensei EZ. At launch, this version was only compatible with Toshiba's A1304T/TII phones, with support for further models added later. In August 2004, support was added for Java ME phones, in addition to the initial BREW release.

NLab called Shin Megami Tensei J a "must-play" game for series fans, and Dengeki Online and Comptiq described it as a "full-fledged" Shin Megami Tensei game and a proper role-playing game; Game Watch thought it captured one of the big appeals of the Shin Megami Tensei series through the large amount of demons appearing in the game. NLab liked the randomly generated dungeons, saying that it keeps the game feeling fresh, and appreciated the amount of options available to players, enabling different play styles. They also liked the smoothly scrolling graphics, making the dungeon exploration comfortable. Sina liked the combat system for being easy to operate.
