= Majin Tensei: Blind Thinker II =

2008 video game

- Title screen
- Developer(s): Bbmf
- Publisher(s): Bbmf
- Series: Majin Tensei
- Platform(s): Mobile phones
- Release: JP: March 24, 2008
- Genre(s): Strategy, role-playing
- Mode(s): Single-player

Majin Tensei: Blind Thinker II (Note: Majin Tensei: Blind Thinker II (Japanese: 魔神転生 blind thinkerII, "Demon God Reincarnation: Blind Thinker II")) is a strategy role-playing video game developed and published by Bbmf for Japanese feature phones starting on March 24, 2008. It is a spin-off from Atlus's Majin Tensei series, which itself is part of the larger Megami Tensei series, and follows the 2007 game Majin Tensei: Blind Thinker.

The game takes place in a demon-infested Tokyo, and follows the devil summoner Takeru and the artificial demon Zora. The player controls Takeru and his allies in turn-based combat, and can both fight enemy demons and negotiate with them to recruit them to the player's side. The developers kept the game similar to the first Blind Thinker, but with a new story and setting, and designed it with the intention that players would replay it several times. The game was well received for its multiple endings.

== Gameplay ==
The player commands demon units in a turn-based combat system.

Majin Tensei: Blind Thinker II is a strategy role-playing video game in which the player takes the role of a devil summoner in two types of segments. In the story parts, the player interacts with characters and makes decisions that affect the direction of the story and which of several endings they will reach.

In the battle parts, the player and the opposing party take turns to command demon units in combat, moving them across the area, attacking enemies on adjacent tiles, and casting offensive or supportive magic. Each battle part has its own victory conditions, which the player must fulfill to clear the battle and progress to the next chapter of the game; the battle is lost if the protagonist or an allied human character dies. The player can build up their party by negotiating with demons, choosing the right dialogue options and offering money or items to make them join their side, and can create new, powerful demons by fusing multiple of their demon allies into a single demon.

== Premise ==
Blind Thinker II takes place in a demon-infested Tokyo, and follows the young man Takeru (タケル) and the artificial demon Zora (ゾラ).

== Release and reception ==
Blind Thinker II was developed and published by Bbmf, who kept the gameplay similar to that of the first Majin Tensei: Blind Thinker game, released the previous year, but set it in a separate world, with a new story and characters, and designed it to be played several times over. They released it for various Japanese feature phones starting on March 24, 2008, through the Megaten Alpha mobile game distribution service.

Dengeki Online and GA Graphic both liked the branching story with its multiple endings for the replay value it brought; GA Graphic also enjoyed how player choices can unlock secret scenarios, making each new playthrough unique.
