= Devil Summoner =

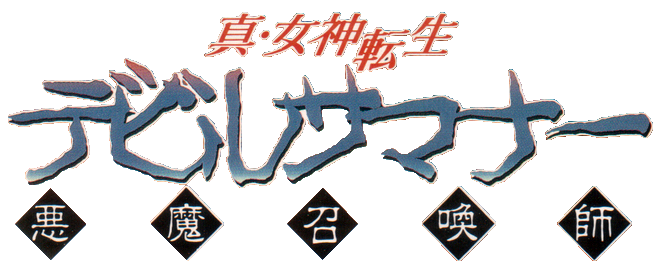
- Logo for the first game, Shin Megami Tensei: Devil Summoner. The font and styling varies throughout the series.
- Genre: Role-playing
- Developer: Atlus
- Publishers: JP: Atlus; NA: Atlus USA; EU: Koei, NIS America, Sega
- Creator: Kouji Okada
- Platforms: Microsoft Windows, Sega Saturn, PlayStation, PlayStation 2, PlayStation Portable, PlayStation 4, PlayStation 5, Nintendo 3DS, Xbox (console), Xbox One, Xbox Series X/S, Nintendo Switch, Nintendo Switch 2
- First release: Shin Megami Tensei: Devil Summoner; December 25, 1995
- Latest release: Raidou Remastered: The Mystery of the Soulless Army; June 19, 2025
- Parent series: Megami Tensei

Devil Summoner, (Note: Debiru Samanā (Japanese: デビルサマナー)) initially marketed as Shin Megami Tensei: Devil Summoner, is a video game franchise developed and primarily published by Atlus. Focused on a series of role-playing video games, Devil Summoner is a spin-off from Atlus' Megami Tensei franchise. The first entry in the series, Shin Megami Tensei: Devil Summoner, was released in 1995 for the Sega Saturn. The series has seen several more games since, with the most recent main entry being Raidou Remastered: The Mystery of the Soulless Army released in 2025.

Devil Summoner began as a spin-off based on the positively-received Shin Megami Tensei If... (1994). The games, set on an alternate Earth between the 1930s and a fictionalized near-future, featuring a person either related to or holding the Kuzunoha family name using demons to investigate cases involving the supernatural. Created by Kouji Okada, the series was developed by multiple Megami Tensei veterans including artist Kazuma Kaneko and composer Shoji Meguro. While each entry has a different story and time period, it shares a universe and uses recurrent detective story elements.

The series remained exclusive to Japan until the release of Devil Summoner: Raidou Kuzunoha vs. the Soulless Army in 2006, with all games apart from the original receiving English localizations from Atlus USA. Several entries have been supported by spin-off media and supplementary game materials. The first two Devil Summoner titles were among the best-selling titles for the Saturn. Games in the series have seen generally positive reception internationally.

== Titles ==
Release timeline
1995	Devil Summoner
1996
1997	Soul Hackers
1998–2005
2006	Raidou Kuzunoha vs. the Soulless Army
2006	Pinball: Judgment
2007	Soul Hackers: Intruder
2008	Soul Hackers: New Generation
2008	Raidou Kuzunoha vs. King Abaddon
2009–2021
2022	Soul Hackers 2
2023–2024
2025	Raidou Remastered: The Mystery of the Soulless Army

=== Main series ===
- Shin Megami Tensei: Devil Summoner is the first entry in the series, and was released in Japan for the Sega Saturn in 1995. The game was later ported to the PlayStation Portable, released in Japan in 2005. It remains exclusive to Japan. Set in the coastal city of Hirasaki, the game follows a silent protagonist brought back from death into the body of detective Kyouji Kuzunoha as he investigates supernatural activities.
- Devil Summoner: Soul Hackers is the second entry in the series, released in Japan for the Sega Saturn in 1997. An expanded PlayStation port was released in Japan in 1999. Another port for Nintendo 3DS was released in 2012 in Japan, and in the West in 2013. Set in Amami City, a coastal city created and run by the tech company Algon Soft, the game follows a member of the Spookies hacker group investigating unusual events surrounding Algon's virtual city.
- Devil Summoner: Raidou Kuzunoha vs. the Soulless Army is the third entry in the series, and was released for the PlayStation 2 (PS2) in 2006 in Japan and North America, and 2007 in Europe. The story follows Raidou Kuzunoha XIV's investigation of the Soulless Army, which is threatening Tokyo. A remaster, Raidou Remastered: The Mystery of the Soulless Army, was released in 2025.
- Devil Summoner 2: Raidou Kuzunoha vs. King Abaddon is the fourth game in the series, and was released for PS2 in 2008 in Japan and 2009 in North America as a limited release. Continuing the story of Raidou Kuzunoha XIV, the storyline follows an investigation into the titular antagonist King Abbadon.
- Soul Hackers 2 is the fifth game and a sequel to Soul Hackers, released worldwide in 2022 for Microsoft Windows, PlayStation 4, PlayStation 5, Xbox One and Xbox Series X/S. Set in the middle of the 21st century, the plot follows Ringo, an agent of the digital being Aion as she gathers summoners from rival clans to face a world-ending threat.

=== Related media ===
The characters and art of the original Devil Summoner were used for the mobile pinball game Shin Megami Tensei Pinball: Judgment, released in Japan in 2006 through EZweb. Soul Hackers saw two mobile follow-ups: Devil Summoner: Soul Hackers – Intruder, a 2007 tactical role-playing game with adventure game elements; and Devil Summoner: Soul Hackers – New Generation, a 2008 turn-based game set in a virtual world.

Devil Summoner was adapted into a live-action television series in 1997, with its popularity prompting a second series in 1998. Two novels based on the series written by Ryo Suzukaze were published by the Aspect Books imprint of Media Works in 1996. Soul Hackers received two novel spin-offs; Devil Summoner Soul Hackers: Death City Korin by Osamu Makino in April 1998 from Aspect Books, and Devil Summoner Soul Hackers: Nightmare of the Butterfly by Shinya Kasai in May 1999 from Famitsu Bunko. A manga adaptation, written by Fumio Sasahara and illustrated by Kazumi Takasawa, was released in two volumes in March and August 1999 by Kadokawa Shoten.

The Raidou Kuzunoha duology saw multiple media expansions. A spin-off novel called Devil Summoner: Raidou Kuzunoha vs. the Dead Messengers, written by Boogey Toumon and illustrated by Kazuma Kaneko, was released by Kadokawa Shoten in 2006. A spin-off manga Devil Summoner: Raidou Kuzunoha vs. Kodoku no Marebito, began serialization through the online Famitsu Comic Clear in 2009, being released in six volumes between 2010 and 2012. The manga was written by Kirihito Ayamura based on a story draft by Kaneko, and supervised by Atlus's Kazuyuki Yamai. A two-part CD drama, Devil Summoner: Raidou Kuzunoha vs. the One-Eyed God, was released by Frontier Works during 2009.

== Recurring elements ==
Rather than the post-apocalyptic setting of the main Megami Tensei series, Devil Summoner takes place in an alternate modern Earth where people known as devil summoners form contracts with demons using devices called COMPs. The protagonists, devil summoners often associated with the Kuzunoha family, investigate misuse of demons. A recurring element is two rival summoner clans, the benevolent Yatagarasu and the malevolent Phantom Society. The Raidou Kuzunoha duology take place in a fictionalized version of Japan's Taishō period. The storylines follow the fourteenth trained devil summoner to take on the title of Raidou Kuzunoha, facing supernatural threats in Tokyo while working at the Narumi Detective Agency.

The first two titles use a traditional turn-based battle system taken from the main Megami Tensei series, with the player character and a team of up to five demons taking part in battles from a first-person perspective while navigating both an overworld map and dungeons. Soul Hackers 2 again uses a turn-based battle system, taking elements of exploiting enemy weaknesses for extra turns from the main Shin Megami Tensei series. The Raidou Kuzunoha duology shifts to an action-based battle system, navigating pre-rendered town and dungeon environments. The protagonist fights in separate battle arenas with two assigned demons through random encounters, with Kuzuhona capturing demons during battles in the first game, and persuading them to join him through a conversation system in the second. An assigned demon can also be used to solve environmental puzzles.

A recurring element is the player's relationship with their demons. While demons are acquired in different ways across the games, a demon's alignment and actions in battle are all play a role in how they respond to commands. If a demon uses a skill they have low affinity for too many times, they will not respond as well to commands. Recruited demons can also be fused into new demons, carrying over particular traits from their predecessors. A resource called Magnatite or its equivalent is needed to keep demons summoned or powers different elements of attacks appears in multiple entries. A recurring character throughout the series is Dr Victor, a person who takes charge of demon fusion and takes on different appearances throughout the series.

== History and development ==
Following the success of the Megami Tensei spin-off Shin Megami Tensei If... in 1994, lead developer Kouji Okada decided to create spin-off series to explore different narrative possibilities; the two initial spin-off titles were Revelations: Persona (1996) for the PlayStation, and Shin Megami Tensei: Devil Summoner for the Saturn. Devil Summoner drew on themes from detective fiction, particularly the melancholic and hardboiled fiction of Raymond Chandler. It was the first Megami Tensei title to be released on a 32-bit fifth-generation home video game console, and the first Megami Tensei game to feature 3D graphics. The staff included Okada as director, recurring writer Ryutaro Ito, and artist Kazuma Kaneko. Following the success of Devil Summoner, development of a sequel moved forward, drawing inspiration from the potential dangers of the internet. Okada and Kaneko returned to their respective roles, while Shogo Isogai created the scenario based on Kaneko's draft.

Following the release of Shin Megami Tensei III: Nocturne in 2003, producer Kazuyuki Yamai wanted a project for his team that would offer new challenges, deciding to make a new Devil Summoner title based on staff feedback. Kaneko returned as character designer. A sequel was produced shortly afterwards, continuing Raidou Kuzunoha's story while being a standalone entry for newcomers, with Kaneko returning as both character designer and producer. It saw mechanical improvements and additions taken from the main series. A sequel to Soul Hackers was long requested by fans, though the original game was growing in age and losing mainstream recognition. Eiji Ishida and Mitsuru Hirata, who had previously worked on multiple entries in the Megami Tensei series, began production on a sequel with reworked mechanics and a new art style led by Shirow Miwa.

While a release overseas was rumored at the time of its release, the original Devil Summoner remains exclusive to Japan, with its age compared to other titles keeping it from being released during the PS2 era. Soul Hackers was originally also exclusive to Japan, with an overseas release only coming with the 3DS port. The localization was created by Atlus USA, with their focus being on emulating its time period through slang and references to cyberpunk fiction. The two Raidou Kuzunoha titles were the first Devil Summoner titles to be released in the West. For the localization of the first Raidou Kuzunoha, project leader Yu Namba incorporated slang from the 1920s to ground the storyline in that period. The second Raidou Kuzunoha saw a limited release in North America. Only three games have been released in Europe through third-party publishers: Soul Hackers by NIS America, the original Raidou Kuzunoha by Koei, and Soul Hackers 2 by Sega.

=== Music ===
The original game's music was composed by Toshiko Tasaki and Tsukasa Masuko, with several tracks being repurposed during production or switching role. For Soul Hackers, Tasaki and Masuko were joined by Shoji Meguro; Meguro focused on the game's cyberpunk themes and atmosphere, lamenting his lack of creative freedom compared to his work on Maken X. Meguro returned for the Raidou Kuzunoha duology, using brass and jazz instrumentation to emulate the 1920s alongside his signature guitar-heavy "MegaTen sound". The music of Soul Hackers 2 is composed by the music group Monaca.

== Reception ==
Japanese and Western review scores As of November 9, 2025.
Game	Year	Famitsu	Metacritic	OpenCritic
Devil Summoner	1995	35/40	—	—
Soul Hackers	1997	34/40	74/100	—
Raidou Kuzunoha vs. the Soulless Army	2006	30/40	74/100	—
Raidou Kuzunoha vs. King Abaddon	2008	32/40	79/100	—
Soul Hackers 2	2022	38/40	74/100	62% recommend

The first two games were among the best-selling titles on the Sega Saturn in Japan. Technology Tell, in a retrospective article on the Megami Tensei franchise, noting it as standing out from the rest of the franchise due to not having a post-apocalyptic setting.

Reception of the first Raidou Kuzunoha game was generally positive, with critics noting its break from the traditional turn-based gameplay of other Megami Tensei series, though noting some problems caused by the new elements. Raidou Kuzunoha 2 saw a stronger reception, with critics praising it as an improvement over the first game.
