= Devil Summoner: Soul Hackers – New Generation =

2008 role-playing video game

- Title screen
- Developer: Bbmf
- Publisher: Bbmf
- Series: Devil Summoner
- Platform: Mobile phones
- Release: JP: July 22, 2008
- Genre: Role-playing
- Mode: Single-player

Devil Summoner: Soul Hackers – New Generation (Note: Devil Summoner: Soul Hackers – New Generation (Japanese: デビルサマナー ソウルハッカーズ NEW GENERATION, Hepburn: Debiru Samanā Sōru Hakkāzu Nyū Jenerēshon)) is a role-playing video game developed and published by Bbmf. It is a spin-off from Atlus's Devil Summoner series, which in turn is part of the Megami Tensei series. It was released for Japanese feature phones starting on July 22, 2008, and was Bbmf's second time making a game based on Devil Summoner: Soul Hackers, following their 2007 strategy role-playing game Soul Hackers: Intruder.

The game is focused on combat: as a devil summoner, the player battles other summoners' demons, with the goal of rising through the ranks and become a master summoner. It was well received for the depth of its combat gameplay, which critics found comparable to that of the original Soul Hackers.

== Gameplay ==
The player battles devil summoners' parties of demons with the goal of becoming a master summoner.

Devil Summoner: Soul Hackers – New Generation is a role-playing video game set in a network-based world in the Soul Hackers setting, where the player takes the role of one of many devil summoners who battle against each other's demons to rise through eight ranks and earn the rank of master summoner. The player develops and plans their team of demons, who have various strengths and weaknesses, access to different physical and magical attacks, and different compatibility with each other; they also determine their formation, with up to three demons placed in the front, and up to three in the back.

The player uses magnetite to summon demons into battle: an allied demon that has been defeated can be summoned again, so long as the player has the required amount. Stronger demons require larger amounts, and the player loses a battle if they run out of demons and the magnetite needed to summon more.

In addition to the challenge battles, through which the player earns higher ranks, there are repeatable free battles, through which the player can train and develop their demons. By visiting Victor in Hotel Goumaden, the player can buy more demons for their team, or fuse multiple demons into single stronger ones, which will inherit magic skills from the demons used in the fusion. There are over 200 types of demons, and a side objective is to collect all of them.

== Release and reception ==
New Generation was developed and published by Bbmf, and was released for Japanese feature phones starting on July 22, 2008, through the Megaten Alpha mobile game distribution service, before being released on services for other carriers throughout the year. The developers chose to eschew the 3D dungeon-crawling gameplay of the original Soul Hackers, and instead focused on strategic combat challenges. It was Bbmf's second mobile game based on Soul Hackers, after the 2007 strategy role-playing game Devil Summoner: Soul Hackers – Intruder; unlike Intruder, which is a sequel set half a year after Soul Hackers, New Generation was not set during any specific time.

GA Graphic liked New Generation's gameplay for being easy to grasp while offering depth; they and Game Watch both found it fitting for a mobile game as it allowed the player to play through battles in a short amount of time. Gpara, too, appreciated the depth of its battles, considering them similar to those of the original Soul Hackers, and liked the amount of demon allies for the player choose from.
