= Jack Bros. =

1995 video game

- North American box art
- Developer: Atlus
- Publisher: Atlus
- Director: Koji Mishima
- Producer: Hideyuki Yokoyama
- Composer: Hiroyuki Yanada
- Series: Megami Tensei
- Platform: Virtual Boy
- Release: JP: September 29, 1995; NA: October 1995
- Genre: Maze
- Mode: Single-player

Jack Bros. (Note: Known in Japan as Jack Brothers' Hee-Ho at the Labyrinth! (Japanese: ジャック・ブラザースの迷路でヒーホー!, Hepburn: Jakku Burazāsu no Meiro de Hīhō!)) is a maze video game developed and published by Atlus for the Virtual Boy, released in late 1995 in Japan and North America. It is a spin-off from Atlus' video game series Megami Tensei, and was the first entry to be released outside Japan.

The player takes the role of one of the three Jack brothers – Jack Frost, Jack Lantern, or Jack Skelton (Note: "Jack Ripper" in the Japanese version and main Megami Tensei series) – who have visited the human world for Halloween, and need to return to the fairy world before the portal connecting the two worlds closes. The player needs to make their way through six areas, which consist of a number of floors, defeating enemies by using character-specific attacks and collecting keys to be able to advance to the next floor. It received generally positive reception for its gameplay, but was criticized for the lack of puzzle elements and under-utilization of the Virtual Boy's 3D effect.

== Gameplay and premise ==
The player searches multi-floor areas for keys while fighting enemies and avoiding traps.

Jack Bros. follows the three Jack brothers – Jack Frost, Jack Lantern and Jack Skelton – who have traveled from the fairy world to the human world through a portal that opens every year on Halloween. Losing track of time, they spend too much time in the human world, and forget about returning until there only is one hour left to the portal's closing; the fairy Pixie shows them a shortcut, which, while dangerous, is the only way to return to the portal in time.

The player picks one of the three brothers to play as; Pixie can also be unlocked as a playable character. They traverse six areas within a time limit to make it back to the fairy world in time. The areas all consist of a number of floors; the player needs to collect all keys on each floor, before being allowed to jump down to a lower floor. To find the keys, the player uses a radar that displays their locations; once all have been collected, it shows the location of the exit. Once the player reaches the bottom floor, they are faced with a boss character they need to defeat, after which they can proceed to the next area.

To defeat enemies, the player can use both regular and special attacks. The latter use up Special Attack Stars; the player starts the game with three, and can gain more throughout the game, which carry over between areas. The types of attacks and stats such as attack power and agility differ depending on the character: Jack Frost's standard attack is throwing snowballs, Jack Lantern's is shooting fire balls, while Jack Skelton uses his knife. Their special attacks are, respectively, freezing all enemies for a few seconds; dealing a large amount of damage to all enemies; and defeating all enemies that are visible on the screen. As the player explores the floors, they need to avoid being attacked by enemies or falling into traps: each time this happens, the remaining time limit decreases by five seconds. If the timer reaches zero, the player reaches a game over state, although they are given the option to restart from the beginning of the current area.

== Development and release ==
Jack Bros. was developed and published by Atlus for the Virtual Boy, and was released on September 29, 1995 in Japan, and October 1995 in North America. According to Nintendo Power, Atlus did not reveal any details about the game's development, although it is known that it initially was planned to be titled Devil Busters. It is a spin-off from Atlus' Megami Tensei series, and the first entry to be released outside Japan. Being a Virtual Boy title, it made use of the system's stereoscopic 3D to display conventional 2D graphics in monochrome red and black visuals, and a graphics technique called parallax scrolling, to create a 3D effect.

On May 14, 2026, Jack Bros. was re-released for the first time via the Nintendo Classics service.

== Reception ==
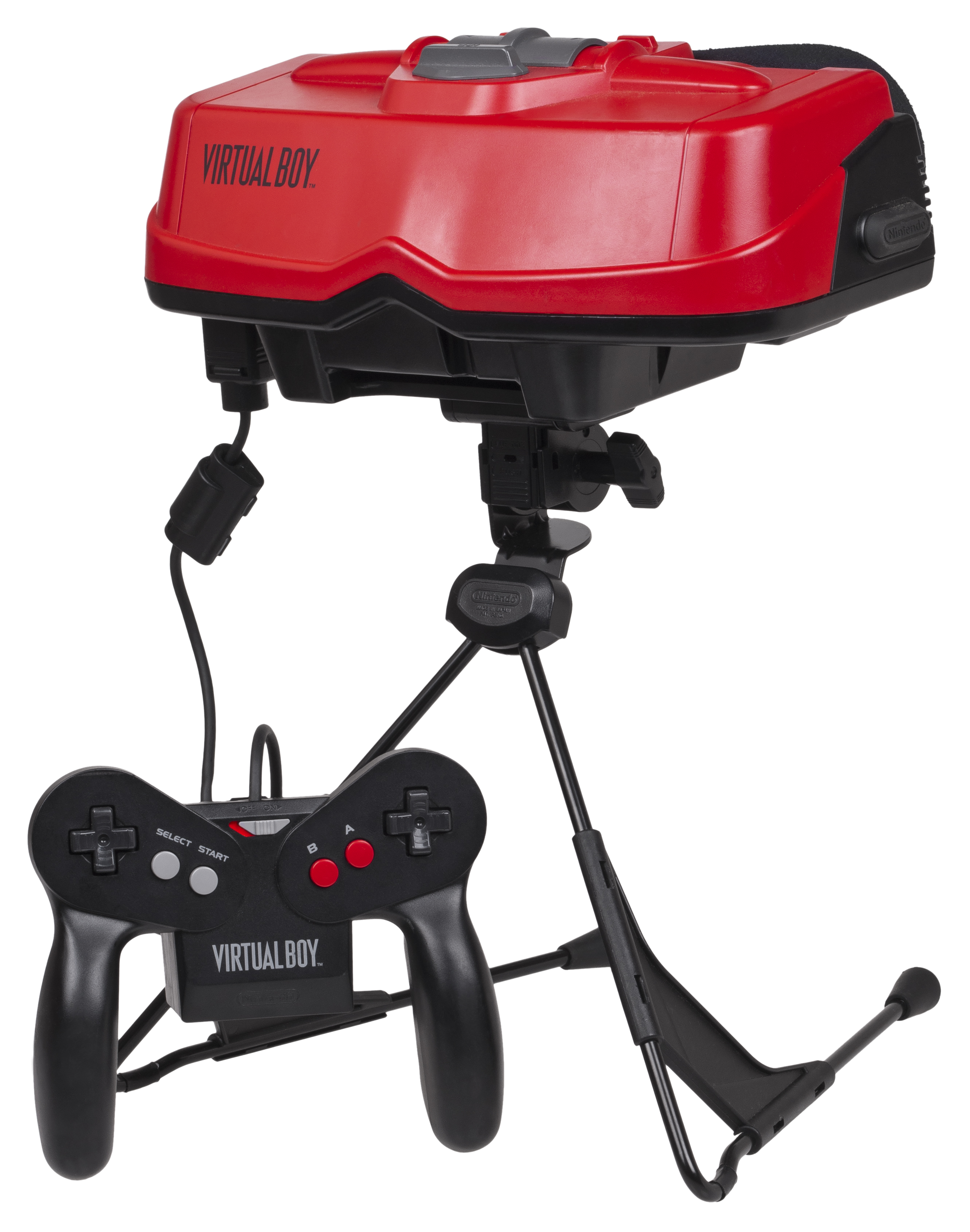
Several critics called Jack Bros. among the best games on the Virtual Boy.

From contemporary reviews, Nintendo Power praised the games graphics and pacing, noting that it was "more challenging than you might expect" while critiquing the in-game text as "poor". In Famitsu, the four reviewers each gave it a score of five, four, six and five out of a potential ten. They found the gameplay relatively fun but plain and that the 3D effect did not enhance the game, with three of the reviewers saying this could have easily been a Game Boy game.

Jack Bros. was well received in retrospective reviews, with multiple critics calling it one of the best games on the platform. Some thought it was held back by the platform, and that it should be made available on other platforms, such as the Nintendo 3DS. In 2003, the staff at Tips & Tricks stated it to be the most uncommon North American Virtual Boy release, giving it a rarity rating of 6/10 based on a consultation with Digital Press.

Brett Elston at GamesRadar thought the gameplay was "fairly basic", but still enjoyed the game, calling it unusually well made. Nintendo Life's Dave Frear enjoyed the game, but wished it had included some puzzle elements rather than focusing entirely on combat; he did however find the strategic thinking involved in going back to earlier areas and figuring out how to save time to make up for this to some extent. Meanwhile, Jason Moore of N64 Magazine wished it had included role-playing elements. Frear enjoyed the replayability resulting from the multiple characters and difficulty settings. GamesRadar's Mikel Reparaz called it "excellent [and] solidly designed" to the point where he would keep playing it despite the eye strain the Virtual Boy would give him.

Frear enjoyed the visual design, calling the enemy designs reminiscent of The Legend of Zelda, and particularly praised the boss characters for looking interesting, with the first boss as the sole exception. He did however note that there was little variety in the environments and that it barely made use of the system's 3D functionality aside from in the effect used when moving to a new floor. Elston also thought the 3D was utilized very little, but still found what was done with it appealing. Frear enjoyed the large variety in the music, and how the sound effects managed to keep the audio experience interesting despite their simplicity. Reparaz said that Jack Bros. had one of the best soundtracks of all time, particularly noting the track from the area "Grim Reaper's Cavern".
