= Shin Megami Tensei If... =

1994 role-playing video game

Shin Megami Tensei If…
- Super Famicom box art
- Developer: Atlus
- Publisher: Atlus
- Director: Kouji Okada
- Designer: Katsura Hashino
- Artist: Kazuma Kaneko
- Writers: Ryutaro Ito; Shogo Isogai
- Composer: Tsukasa Masuko
- Series: Megami Tensei
- Platforms: Super Famicom, PlayStation, i-Revo, iOS
- Release: October 28, 1994: Super Famicom; JP: October 28, 1994 PlayStation; JP: December 26, 2002 i-Revo; JP: March 14, 2006 iOS; JP: March 22, 2013
- Genre: Role-playing
- Mode: Single-player

Shin Megami Tensei If…, (Note: Shin Megami Tensei If… (Japanese: 真・女神転生if…; lit. True Goddess Reincarnation If…)) stylized as Shin Megami Tensei if…, is a role-playing video game developed and published by Atlus exclusively released in Japan in 1994 for the Super Famicom. It is a spin-off from the Shin Megami Tensei series, itself part of the larger Megami Tensei franchise. Since release, it has been ported to mobile devices, PlayStation and Microsoft Windows; it had also been re-released on the Virtual Console in Japan on Wii in 2011 and Wii U in 2013, as well as the Nintendo Classics service in 2021. The story follows a student of Karukozaka High School after their school is sucked into the realm of demons by a vengeful student's demon summoning spell going wrong.

Shin Megami Tensei If… was developed as a change from previous Shin Megami Tensei titles, focusing on a small-scale environment and threat rather than a large-scale environment as in previous titles. Upon release, If… received a positive reception from critics and fans, and inspired multiple tie-in print adaptations and a mobile prequel. Positive response to its setting and spin-off status was the impetus for the creation of the spin-off Persona and Devil Summoner series.

== Gameplay ==
A battle, with the protagonist in conversation with a demon in the PlayStation version

Shin Megami Tensei If… is a role-playing video game in which players take the role of the protagonist (an unnamed boy or girl, who appears in later Megami Tensei titles as a girl named Tamaki Uchida). As the protagonist, the player explores both the demon-infested Karukozaka High School and five towers based on the Seven Deadly Sins. During the course of the game, using a wrist-mounted device called a COMP, the player fights demons through a turn-based battle system, using physical and magical attacks to deal damage, as well as healing party members and casting status buffs and ailments on enemies.

Demons can be talked with in battle and recruited if the right conversation is initiated. Once a part of the player's party, they will fight alongside them. In addition to standard demons, the player can ally with one human companion, with three being available on the first playthrough and a fourth unlocking during the second. When the player or their human partner dies in battle, they are granted a Guardian Spirit, who revives them at the last save point and teaches them new skills and alters the player's stats. The Guardian's specialties affect how stats are changed: a higher power ranking will raise the player's strength, but lower magic will decrease their Magic Point meter. The Guardian changes each time the player dies.

== Synopsis ==
At Karukozaka High School, bullied and brilliant student Ideo Hazama attempts to summon a demon from the Expanse to exact revenge on his tormentors. The summoning goes wrong and Hazama is possessed by the demon, declaring himself as the "Demon Emperor" and throws the school into the demon's realm. The protagonist is among those trapped in the school, along with fellow students Reiko Akanezawa, Yumi Shirakawa, Shinji "Charlie" Kuroi and Akira Miyamoto. Should the protagonist side with Yumi or Shinji, they navigate the demon-infested school and towers, finally confronting and defeating Hazama. In Yumi's route, the school is restored as if nothing happened, while in Shinji's route the school and its students remain trapped in the Expanse along with Hazama remaining a threat. If the Protagonist allied with Reiko, they enter the Demon Emperor's mind after he is first defeated, and see Hazama's motivations for his actions. Reiko, Hazama's sister, calms him and stays with him in the Expanse while the protagonist is teleported back to the human world and the school is returned to normal. In another route unlocked on a second playthrough, the protagonist can ally with Akira, who seeks vengeance against the demons who sucked the school into the demon's realm. Travelling to the Land of Nomos, Akira is killed and possessed by the demon Amon, who after defeating Hazama takes his place as the Demon Emperor, having fused together into one entity sending the protagonist back to the human world alone.

== Development ==
Shin Megami Tensei If… was developed as a spin-off from the main series. Its smaller world scope came about because the game's director Kouji Okada felt he had reached the limit of what he could do with large-scale worlds in the previous Shin Megami Tensei games. The main concept was for a high school setting rendered in three dimensions where a portal to hell would open, creating a more self-contained adventure. The modelling for Karukozaka High School was based on pictures from writer Ryutaro Ito's school album as they had no other visual resources. The project's working title was Shin Megami Tensei X. The Partner system was divided into main and sub categories, with three to four playable characters available. The ability for sub characters to wield COMPs and need to be rescued was planned, but both were rejected. The Guardian system was designed by future Megami Tensei director Katsura Hashino. The game's music was written by Tsukasa Masuko. One of the game's main themes, the Karukozaka High School school song heard during the ending, had lyrics written by Ito, who based them on the lyrics of his own school's song. Masuko was unimpressed when Ito asked for the lyrics to be added to the song. While only one line is ever heard in-game, Ito created three lines. If… was completed in a very short span of time, so much so that in 2003 Okada later described the development time as being "unthinkable" for any developer.

If… was designed to represent the series' titular theme of reincarnation, which had been markedly absent from previous Shin Megami Tensei titles, along with enabling players to continue enjoying the game even after their party was defeated. It also acted as a "lifeboat" for players that regularly died in battle. The cast's names were drawn from multiple real-life and fictional sources. The names for Yumi, Reiko and Shinji were inspired by pitchers in the Japanese baseball team Nippon-Ham Fighters. Akira's transformation into Amon was inspired by the similar transformation of the main character in the manga Devilman. Akira's name was also taken from the main character of the manga. Hazama's surname is taken from the titular character of the manga Black Jack. His given name, Ideo, is based on the English word "ideology". Sato, a member of the school's computer club and the one who first introduces the Devil Summoner Program, got his name from the Japanese physicist Katsuhiko Sato. Similarly, two side characters related to Shinji took their names from Ryuichi Sakamoto and Akiko Yano. The characters were designed by regular series artist Kazuma Kaneko. He would later call the game one of his favorites, liking the uniformity of his designs and its relatable story themes.

== Release ==
Shin Megami Tensei If… was first released on the Super Famicom on October 28, 1994. It was re-released on December 26, 2002, for the PlayStation. The PlayStation port contains additional elements such as an easy mode, along with retouched graphics and updated character art. This port was released on the PlayStation Network on September 8, 2010. It was also ported to Microsoft Windows for the i-Revo PC system in 2006. The Super Famicom version has been ported to Nintendo's Virtual Console for Wii and Wii U. A port of the game for iOS was released on March 22, 2013, marking the game's first appearance on a portable platform.

On April 22, 2004, Atlus released a mobile game titled Shin Megami Tensei If…: Hazama's Chapter (真・女神転生if…ハザマ編, Shin Megami Tensei ifu… Hazama-hen) for FOMA 900i mobiles. It acts as a prologue to the events of Shin Megami Tensei If…, following Hazama's activities prior to the incident. Hazama's Chapter was intended for inclusion as part of the original release of If…, but space limitations forced it to be cut. The team considered offering it as a limited ROM cartridge for players, but budgetary constraints prevented this.

An English fan translation of the Super Famicom version was released on October 25, 2018, by the Aeon Genesis team.

== Reception and legacy ==
Reception

Review score
Publication	Score	
Publication	PS	SNES
Famicom Tsūshin	7/10, 7/10, 7/10, 7/10	8/10, 7/10, 7/10, 7/10

The reviewers in Famitsu Weekly complimented the PlayStation's port's music and story and found the graphics dated and felt that players new to the series would find playing through the game difficult. According to Hashino, the game's high school setting was popular with fans of the series. Kurt Kalata and Christopher J. Snelgrove at Hardcore Gaming 101 thought the game was fun, but noted that it lacked the "philosophical and religious quandaries" present in the first two Shin Megami Tensei titles. They also noted that it was shorter than the previous two games, but that the different dungeons and endings the game offers depending on who the player chooses as their partner resulted in a high replayability factor. They found the Guardian system interesting, but considered it a strange decision to force the player to die on purpose to get a new Guardian. RPGFan's Kyle Miller thought that the game's music was worse than that in previous Shin Megami Tensei games, but still enjoyable.

A manga based on the game written and illustrated by Kazuaki Yanagisawa, Shin Megami Tensei If…: Demon Envoy of the School (真・女神転生if… 学園の悪魔使い, Shin Megami Tensei ifu… Gakuen no Akuma Tsukai), was published in 1995. It was released in France in 2006 as Shin Megami Tensei If…. A second manga also written and illustrated by Yanagisawa, Shin Megami Tensei Kahn, was released in 2008. This manga was also licensed for release in English. A light novel adaptation of the game, titled Shin Megami Tensei If…: Djinn of Demon Realm (真・女神転生if… 魔界のジン, Shin Megami Tensei ifu: Makai no Jin) and written by Yoru Yoshimura and Eiji Kaneda, was published in 2002.

The game's setting proved popular enough for Atlus to create a game focused around it titled Megami Ibunroku Persona, the first game in the Persona series. The Guardian system also provided inspiration for the series' titular gameplay mechanic. Karukozaka High School was later featured as the setting for an optional story quest in the PlayStation Portable remake of Persona 2: Innocent Sin. Its popularity and modern-day setting also influenced the development of Shin Megami Tensei: Devil Summoner, the first game in the Devil Summoner series. Accessories and outfits from Shin Megami Tensei If… have also been featured in the massively multiplayer online role-playing game Shin Megami Tensei: Imagine, and as downloadable content for the game Persona 5 along with Shin Megami Tensei If… music.
