= Raidou Remastered: The Mystery of the Soulless Army =

- Cover art for the game
- Developer: Atlus
- Publisher: Sega: JP: Atlus
- Director: Kazuyuki Yamai
- Producers: Kazuyuki Yamai; Shinjiro Takata
- Designers: Hiroki Sugizaki; Kenshiro Kaizuka; Keuichi Yamatsuta
- Programmer: Satoshi Ōyama
- Artists: Kazuma Kaneko; Eiji Ishida
- Writers: Shigeo Komori; Kazuyuki Yamai
- Composer: Shoji Meguro
- Series: Devil Summoner
- Engine: Unity
- Platforms: Nintendo Switch; Nintendo Switch 2; PlayStation 4; PlayStation 5; Windows; Xbox Series X/S
- Release: June 19, 2025
- Genre: Action role-playing
- Mode: Single-player

Raidou Remastered: The Mystery of the Soulless Army is a 2025 action role-playing game developed by Atlus and published by Sega. It is a remaster of Devil Summoner: Raidou Kuzunoha vs. the Soulless Army (2006), the third title in the Devil Summoner series, which is a sub-series part of the larger Megami Tensei franchise. It revolves around Raidou Kuzunoha, a high school-aged detective with the ability to summon demons who investigates a supernatural attack on Taishō era Tokyo. The remaster was released for Nintendo Switch, Nintendo Switch 2, PlayStation 4, PlayStation 5, Windows, and Xbox Series X/S, featuring improved visuals and overhauled combat system.

== Plot ==
The story follows Raidou through his investigation as he scours all of Tokyo for clues while meeting various important people in the city and uncovering something greater than either Raidou or Narumi could ever have suspected.

== Reception ==
Reception

Aggregate scores
Aggregator	Score
Metacritic	(NS) 76/100 (NS2) 76/100 (PC) 82/100 (PS5) 75/100
OpenCritic	81% recommend

Review scores
Publication	Score
Nintendo Life	8/10
Nintendo World Report	7.5/10
PC Gamer (US)	71/100
Push Square	8/10
RPGFan	80/100
Shacknews	8/10

Raidou Remastered: The Mystery of the Soulless Army received "generally positive" reviews from critics, according to review aggregator Metacritic. Fellow review aggregator OpenCritic assessed that the game received strong approval, being recommended by 81% of critics.

Cullen Black, writing for RPGSite, rated the remaster 7/10. He praised the game for maintaining the original look with the new graphical upgrade and appreciated the lack of random encounters, allowing players to choose their own battles, while also criticising the remaster for "sanding down" the "mystery and problem solving of the original game" through forced objective markers. Sam Woods, writing for The Gamer rated the game 2.5/5 and criticized it for having objective markers and a "shallow and repetitive" combat system. Nick Rodriguez, writing for GameRant rated the remaster 8/10 and praised it for improved combat system and quality of life improvements to progression and presentation. Shaun Prescott, writing for PC Gamer, rated the remaster 71/100.
