= Devil Summoner 2: Raidou Kuzunoha vs. King Abaddon =

2008 video game

- North American cover art
- Developer: Atlus
- Publisher: Atlus
- Director: Kazuyuki Yamai
- Producer: Kazuma Kaneko
- Designer: Eiji Ishida
- Programmer: Satoshi Ōyama
- Artist: Kazuma Kaneko
- Writer: Shinji Yamamoto
- Composer: Shoji Meguro
- Series: Devil Summoner
- Platform: PlayStation 2
- Release: JP: October 23, 2008; NA: May 12, 2009
- Genre: Action role-playing
- Mode: Single-player

Devil Summoner 2: Raidou Kuzunoha vs. King Abaddon (Note: デビルサマナー 葛葉ライドウ 対 アバドン王 (Japanese: Debiru Samanā Kuzunoha Raidō tai Abadon Ō), titled Shin Megami Tensei: Devil Summoner 2: Raidou Kuzunoha vs. King Abaddon in North America) is a 2008 action role-playing game developed and published by Atlus for the PlayStation 2. The game is the fourth in the Devil Summoner series, which is a part of the larger Megami Tensei franchise, and serves as the direct sequel to Devil Summoner: Raidou Kuzunoha vs. the Soulless Army. It was released in Japan in October 2008 and in North America in May 2009.

== Gameplay ==
Gameplay is similar to that of the previous Raidou Kuzunoha game with some expansions and refinements. While traveling throughout Tsukudo-Cho and the neighboring towns, Raidou and Gouto can investigate into the case by speaking with civilians and searching for clues or other items. The store at Konnou-Ya still exists, as does the Gouma-Den. Upon entering the Dark Realm or other hostile environments, Raidou will randomly engage in battles with demonic foes.

During battle, Raidou can attack with his sword (a stronger weapon which can combo to deal much greater damage) or gun (a weaker weapon which can stun enemies). He can also block with his sword to reduce damage taken and dodge roll to evade enemy attacks altogether. However, the core of the battle system involves utilizing the game's various demons, many of which hail from previous Shin Megami Tensei games.

The Pokémon-styled capturing mechanism present in the previous game is no more; instead, Raidou can now negotiate with enemy demons to try to persuade or bribe them to join his side. Raidou can summon two of the demons from his roster at any time to fight alongside him; demons employ a variety of offensive, support, or healing spells which will greatly expedite the flow of battle. Both Raidou and his demons will level up as they continue to win fights; additionally, monsters may drop Yen or items.

Raidou will also need to strategically balance his MAG (Magnetite) across fights. MAG is required to use demons' spells, and more potent spells require more consumption of MAG. Merely killing enemies yields a tiny amount of MAG, but the key to much greater MAG acquisition is exploiting enemies' elemental weaknesses and physically attacking them while they are stunned from being hit by spells that target their weaknesses. In this way, Raidou must expend MAG to regain MAG; the goal is to attack with effective spells in order to absorb more MAG than is being expended.

Outside of battle, demons can assist with investigations via skills such as mind-reading and transforming Raidou into various key individuals in order to deceive shady characters into giving up critical information. In order to continually gain higher-level and more diverse monsters, Raidou can utilize Dr. Victor's Gouma-Den to fuse monster together, creating more powerful demons for Raidou to access provided he has the capacity to control them. Other self-improvements include synthesizing better swords for Raidou and sacrificing demons to raise the strength of standard demons.

== Plot ==
=== Characters ===
The player controls Raidou Kuzunoha XIV, a young devil summoner charged with protecting the Capital. He is aided by Gotou-Douji, a black cat who is a reincarnation of Raidou Kuzunoha I, who has been punished for a crime in the past. Raidou works under Detective Narumi from the Narumi Detective Agency. Kichou "Tae" Asakura, a young news reporter provides him leads to solving the detective's cases.

In the story, Akane Narita, the daughter of the finance minister, asks Raidou to search for a man named Dahn. Along the way, Raidou meets with Geirin Kuzunoha XVII, a member of a separate branch of the Kuzunoha clan, and his apprentice, Nagi.

=== Story ===
The game is set after its predecessor, with Raidou Kuzunoha the 14th again being summoned by the Yatagarasu to protect the Capital of Japan. The Taishō period in Japanese history has been fictionally extended into its 20th year, placing the events of the game in the early 1930s (but with a setting influenced more so by the 1920s). Raidou and his mentor, the talking cat Gouto, are again called upon to protect the prosperity and peace of the Capital by simultaneously working undercover at the Narumi Detective Agency and battling demonic foes using the powers Raidou carries as a Summoner. The story begins when a young woman enters the detective agency and asks Narumi's and Raidou's help in locating a curious man named Dahn.

== Development ==
Raidou Kuzunoha vs. King Abaddon is the fourth entry in the Devil Summoner series developed by Atlus, which forms part of the larger Megami Tensei series: as with other entries, its narrative takes the form of a modern-day detective story as opposed to the series' more prevalent post-apocalyptic settings. The game's story, while continuing Raidou Kuzunoha's story and tying into the subseries' themes, was completely independent of other Devil Summoner titles and could be enjoyed by series newcomers. The staff of Raidou Kuzunoha vs. the Soulless Army returned to their respective roles: producer and character designer Kazuma Kaneko, director Kazuyuki Yamai, and composer Shoji Meguro. Meguro continued using the jazzy brass-based musical style of Raidou Kuzunoha vs. the Soulless Army, although he adjusted it to sound grander than its predecessor. To get higher sound quality, Meguro had difficulty completing his work as the digital audio software he used previously was outdated and he needed to move onto new software.

During development, the team used the systems of Raidou Kuzunoha vs. the Soulless Army as a base for their work, but pushed towards an altered gameplay pace, expanding its content, elements such as increasing Raidou's movement speed through environments, and generally developing the game as an "evolution" of its predecessor. As opposed to the previous work, the team created a division between town and dungeon environments, with towns being demon-free environments. The dungeon environments were incorporated from earlier Megami Tensei games, which featured dungeon crawling gameplay elements. The team also managed to increase the number of demons that could be displayed on-screen at any one time, along with adjustments to allied demon AI so it would be more responsive in battle. The demon negotiation system, a standard element from earlier titles, was also incorporated into the game. Changes were made to demon fusion and elements of their character growth so as to streamline the process for players.

Raidou Kuzunoha vs. King Abaddon was first announced in August 2008 for release on October 23. Alongside a standard edition, a limited special edition was released that included a copy of Shin Megami Tensei: Nocturne Maniax. Titled Shin Megami Tensei III: Nocturne Maniax Chronicle Edition, it carried over the content of the original Maniax edition while replacing guest character Dante from the Devil May Cry series with Raidou Kuzunoha. It was announced for a North American release in January 2009 for a release on May 12 that year. It was distributed as a limited release, with first print editions coming with a Jack Frost plush toy styled after Raidou Kuzunoha. Upon being asked on their official European forums about a possible release, Tecmo Koei, which handled publishing duties for the European release of Raidou Kuzunoha vs. the Soulless Army, responded that there were no plans for a European release for Raidou Kuzunoha vs. King Abaddon. The two Raidou Kuzunoha titles received limited reprints in 2012 to commemorate the release of the 3DS port of Devil Summoner: Soul Hackers and give new players a chance to experience earlier entries in the Devil Summoner series. It was explained at the time that their release on the PlayStation Network was being delayed due to the software the Devil Summoner games were created for being incompatible with the then-current version of PSN. Raidou Kuzunoha vs. King Abaddon was later released on the North American PlayStation Store on June 24, 2014.

== Reception ==
Reception

Aggregate score
Aggregator	Score
Metacritic	79/100

Review scores
Publication	Score
1Up.com	A
GameSpot	7.5/10
GameTrailers	7.3/10
IGN	7.5/10
X-Play	4/5

SMT: Raidou Kuzunoha vs. King Abaddon received "generally positive" reception, according to review aggregator Metacritic.
