= Majin Tensei: Blind Thinker =

2007 strategy role-playing video game

- Title screen
- Developer: Bbmf
- Publishers: Bbmf (mobile); G-Mode (Switch, Windows)
- Series: Majin Tensei
- Platforms: Mobile phones, Nintendo Switch, Windows
- Release: Mobile phones: JP: July 11, 2007; Nintendo Switch, Windows: JP: November 16, 2023
- Genres: Strategy, role-playing
- Mode: Single-player

Majin Tensei: Blind Thinker (Note: Majin Tensei: Blind Thinker (Japanese: 魔神転生 blind thinker; "Demon God Reincarnation: Blind Thinker")) is a strategy role-playing video game developed and published by Bbmf. It is a spin-off from Atlus's Majin Tensei series, which itself is part of the larger Megami Tensei series. It was originally released on July 11, 2007, for Japanese feature phones, and was re-released by G-Mode on November 16, 2023, for Nintendo Switch and Windows, as part of their G-Mode Archives+ line. It was followed by the sequel Majin Tensei: Blind Thinker II in 2008.

The game is set in Neo Tokyo after World War III, and follows the devil summoner Yuuji Kashiwagi. The player controls Yuuji and his allies in a turn-based combat system, and can negotiate with enemy demons to recruit them to their side; these can in turn be fused into one, to create stronger demon allies. The game was well received by critics and players for its branching story which leads to multiple scenarios, and endings, and for the depth and challenge of its combat.

== Gameplay ==
The player commands units in a turn-based combat system.

Majin Tensei: Blind Thinker is a strategy role-playing video game in which the player takes the role of a devil summoner. It is split into story and battle parts: in the former, the player makes choices that affect the direction of the story, such as choosing which of their companions to support, leading into separate routes with different endings. The battle parts are turn-based, and has the player command several units to fulfill the victory conditions for each chapter; the player loses if the protagonist or a friendly human character falls in battle.

Aside from moving units, attacking adjacent enemy units, and casting supportive or offensive magic, the player can start negotiations with enemy demon units to attempt to recruit them to their side. Negotiation is affected by the phase of the moon, and is likelier to succeed the closer the current phase is to a new moon. Once recruited, demons can be summoned by the player to fight alongside them in battle, in exchange for money and magnetite acquired through defeating enemies. The player can fuse several allied demons into a single more powerful demon to build up a stronger party; different combinations of demons yield different results, which have their own strengths and weaknesses.

== Premise ==
Blind Thinker is set in 20XX after World War III, twenty years after the Japanese energy company AGE has constructed the city Neo Tokyo. It follows Yuuji Kashiwagi, (Note: Yuuji Kashiwagi (柏木 勇二, Kashiwagi Yuuji)) whose missing father has left behind a demon summoning program.

== Development and release ==
Blind Thinker was originally developed and published by Bbmf for feature phones in Japan starting on July 11, 2007, with releases on various phones continuing throughout the year. As a spin-off of the original 1994 Majin Tensei game, it retains many of its elements, including the setting of a demon-infested Tokyo and the use of character designs by Kazuma Kaneko, although simplifies some of its gameplay mechanics.

G-Mode re-released Blind Thinker for Nintendo Switch and Windows on November 16, 2023, as part of their G-Mode Archives+ line, which aims to reproduce feature phone games as they were at the time of their original release. The game was followed by the sequel Majin Tensei: Blind Thinker II on March 24, 2008.

== Reception ==
Blind Thinker was a success, and was well received by critics and players; GA Graphic described it as eagerly awaited for its continuation of the Majin Tensei setting, and Den Fami Nico Gamer described it as popular with players, who appreciated it for its strategic battles and dark setting.

Critics enjoyed its gameplay: Famitsu called it a fun and satisfying strategy game with challenging but rewarding combat, and found it exciting to fuse demons to create a strong party, as did GA Graphic, while Dou Namiki of Den Fami Nico Gamer appreciated the strategic combat for its depth. The story was also well received: Famitsu liked its multiple scenarios and how it adapts to the player's choices; Inside Games, finding the story simultaneously fresh and nostalgic, appreciated how the many scenarios gives the game a high replay value; and Den Fami Nico Gamer liked it for its "unique" setting and rich story.
