= Soul Hackers 2 =

2022 role-playing video game

- Developer: Atlus (Note: Ported to Windows and Xbox One by Artdink.)
- Publishers: JP: Atlus; WW: Sega
- Directors: Eiji Ishida; Mitsuru Hirata
- Producers: Eiji Ishida; Mitsuru Hirata
- Designer: Mitsuru Hirata
- Programmer: Junichi Nakamura
- Artist: Shirow Miwa
- Writers: Makoto Miyauchi; Haruna Sato; Eiji Ishida
- Composer: Monaca (Note: Music co-composed by Monaca members Keiichi Okabe, Keigo Hoashi, Kuniyuki Takahashi, Shotaro Seo, Oliver Good and Keita Inoue)
- Series: Devil Summoner; Megami Tensei
- Engine: Unity
- Platforms: PlayStation 4; PlayStation 5; Windows; Xbox One; Xbox Series X/S
- Release: JP: August 25, 2022; WW: August 26, 2022
- Genre: Role-playing
- Mode: Single-player

Soul Hackers 2 (Note: Japanese: ソウルハッカーズ2, Hepburn: Sōru Hakkāzu Tsū) is a 2022 role-playing video game developed by Atlus. It was published by Atlus in Japan and by Sega worldwide for PlayStation 4, PlayStation 5, Windows, Xbox One, and Xbox Series X/S. The game is the fifth installment in the Devil Summoner series, itself a part of the larger Megami Tensei franchise, and a sequel to Devil Summoner: Soul Hackers (1997). The plot follows Ringo and Figue, manifested agents of the artificial intelligence Aion, as they seek and recruit people from rival groups of Devil Summoners who are key to preventing an approaching apocalypse. Gameplay has Ringo and her party exploring dungeon environments within a futuristic city, and fighting enemies in turn-based combat.

Soul Hackers 2 was developed by a team incorporating several Tokyo Mirage Sessions ♯FE staff members including Eiji Ishida and Mitsuru Hirata, who worked as co-producers and co-directors, and scenario writer Makoto Miyauchi. The team collaborated with artist Shirow Miwa on character designs, and composers from the studio Monaca led by Keiichi Okabe to create the soundtrack.

Soul Hackers 2 received mixed reviews from critics, who praised its presentation, combat system, and story, but criticized the dungeon design, side content, and implementation of downloadable content. The game failed to meet the sales expectations of Sega.

== Gameplay ==
An early battle in Soul Hackers 2

Soul Hackers 2 is a role-playing video game in which players take on the role of artificial being Ringo, who is joined during the game with three human allies with different abilities. The story is communicated through a combination of fully 3D in-engine cutscenes, and dialogue sections combining in-game 3D models with 2D character portraits. Progression is tied to story-based quests, with the player moving between safe zones holding associated services for supporting the player party such as item and equipment shops, and explorable dungeon environments featuring combat encounters with and using Demons. Requests, the game's form of side quests, can be completed to earn in-game money and items. Alongside standard dungeons is the Soul Matrix, dungeons tied to members of Ringo's party which can be explored and cleared to gain additional skills for the party. The scale of a party member's Soul Matrix is determined by their Soul Bond, which can be strengthened by spending time with them outside combat or making specific dialogue choices in story cutscenes.

Enemies in dungeons are represented by humanoid symbols, their colour determining enemy strength and aggression. Ringo can stun them and avoid combat, or engage; if the enemy hits the party first, they get the first attack in combat, while Ringo initiating the attack gives the party first attack and can trigger a free opening attack from a party member. Battles are turn-based, with each side getting a set of actions, using both standard attacks and skills assigned to their COMP weapons via Demons. A core element of combat is exploiting weaknesses, which deal more damage; weakness include elemental attacks, and melee or ranged attacks depending on enemy type. Striking an enemy's weakness adds points to a Stack, and at the end of that turn the accumulated Stack is spent in a Sabbath, a powerful multi-Demon attack that increases in strength with higher Stack points. Some demons can learn and use Tamdem Skills, adding an additional effect to the Sabbath such as inflicting a status effect or recovering the party's magic points. Another later element of combat is Commander Skills, an ability unique to Ringo that grants special boons in battle.

As with other Megami Tensei titles, demons play a key role in combat, and can be recruited and customised by the player. Upon entering a dungeon, Ringo sends out some of her assigned demons to explore the dungeon environment, with finding them granting new information, items, healing, and potential new demons. Demons will join the party after fulfilling their request such as giving an item. A demon can then be equipped to COMPs, changing each party member's accessible skills. Alongside recruitment, new demons can be accessed through Fusion, where two demons are fused into a new Demon type at a specific in-game location. Players can select which skills are carried over from each fused demon into the new creation. While any two demons can be fused, fusing two specific ones triggers a Special Fusion, creating a more powerful Demon. Once a Demon has acquired all skills, it gifts the party with a Mistique, an equippable item which grants passive bonuses. Demons can be logged in a Demon Compendium, allowing them to be summoned again for a fee. New Game Plus carries over current Soul Bond level, unlocking further character scenes, alongside costumes and accessories unlocked during the first playthrough. Character levels, items, money, and unlocked demons are carried over optionally.

== Synopsis ==
Soul Hackers 2 is set in a near-future city where humans and demons coexist in secret, with some humans able to form pacts with demons to become Devil Summoners. The Devil Summoners are mostly split between two main factions, Yatagarasu and the Phantom Society, who hold clashing ideological views on humanity's progress. During the game's opening, a world-ending catastrophe brought by a being called the Great One is predicted by the previously-neutral Aion, a higher artificial intelligence entity that emerged within cyberspace. Aion manifests two parts of themself, Ringo and Figue, as individuals to enter the human world and save humans calculated as key to preventing the Great One's arrival. The individuals are Arrow, a Yatagarasu agent; Milady, a Phantom Society summoner and lover of the apparent mastermind Iron Mask; and Saizo, a freelance summoner whose Phantom Society lover Ash becomes involved in his murder. Ringo brings each back in turn using Soul Hack, an ability to restore their souls and bodies. Investigating the death of researcher Ichiro Onda and disappearance of senior Yatagarasu member Mangetsu Kuzunoha, the group eventually discover Iron Mask is searching for the Covenants, five magical entities acting as symbols of an ancient pact with the Great One.

Kuzunoha was researching the Covenants, which when gathered together can summon the Great One and remake the world, with Onda and Arrow assisting him. Onda was conducting research to uplift humanity, driven by his Covenant's purpose to further human progress, when he was killed. Kuzunoha is also later killed and his Covenant apparently taken. Milady and Saizo also held Covenants, but Milady's attaches to Figue when Ringo revives her. The group are aided by Raven, a former Yatagarasu summoner to whom Figue becomes attached. The group are eventually ambushed and captured by Iron Mask and his artificial demon Zenon who demand Figue's covenant. Figue infects it with a computer virus which renders Zenon vulnerable. Zenon is killed with Ash's help, but Iron Mask escapes with the four of the Covenants. Figue later reveals Kuzunoha created a false Covenant for himself, sealing the original inside Arrow and blocking his memories to hide its presence. They further learn from Milady that the real Iron Mask was killed, with the current one being an imposter.

The Covenant is unsealed within Arrow, allowing him to see that Raven has the others, exposing him as the false Iron Mask and mastermind behind the Great One's summoning. Transferring Arrow's Covenant to Figue, the group stop Milady from attacking the orphanage in revenge for Iron Mask's death, then end up in a final duel with Raven. Despite Figue's plea, Raven fights to the death, having been broken by the constant fighting between summoner gangs and seeing no other way but the Great One to end it. A devastated Figue decides to use the Covenants to enact a humanity-wide Soul Hack and remove the will for conflict, causing Aion to shut down as her will overrides it. In the normal ending, Figue fades away after the group defeat her, and Ringo is left the only Aion agent remaining, vowing to observe humanity and report to Aion if it returns, while the summoners part ways. If all Soul Matrix quests are completed, Ringo can perform a Soul Hack on Figue after her defeat, reviving her with help from Raven's spirit. The summoners part ways as friends, and Ringo and Figue restore Aion who decides to reveal themself to humanity.

== Development ==
Soul Hackers 2 was developed by Atlus, long-time developers of the Devil Summoner series and its parent franchise Megami Tensei. The co-producers and co-directors Eiji Ishida and Mitsuru Hirata had previously worked entries in the Shin Megami Tensei series and the spin-off title Tokyo Mirage Sessions ♯FE (2015), while scenario writer Makoto Miyauchi worked on the Etrian Odyssey and Megami Tensei series. Since the release of the original Devil Summoner: Soul Hackers in 1997, the Megami Tensei franchise had grown increasingly popular, particularly through its Persona subseries. The developers wanted to return to the Devil Summoner series, and create a sequel to Soul Hackers that would be easy for new players to engage with while carrying over classic elements from the series. Concept work for the game began after Hirata and Ishida finished work on Tokyo Mirage Sessions ♯FE. Due to the size of the project the two worked collaboratively, with Ishida creating the world design, while Hirata focused on the game design.

Compared to the original game's 2D first-person design, Soul Hackers 2 used a 3D third-person perspective to promote immersion and a more cinematic style. The battle system was based on the established Press Turn system, carrying over established mechanics of exploiting weaknesses while cutting down on both the risk factor and the time taken in battles. The COMP devices were redesigned, retaining established elements while expanded in function to fit in with the new setting and game mechanics. The Soul Matrix quests were compared by Hirata to the Vision Quests of the original game. The dungeon design was split between realistic locations with a lot of horizontal designs, and the Soul Matrix dungeons which used more fantastic elements. The character relationship mechanics were compared by Ishida to the Persona series, though the tone and adult cast set it apart from the high-school settings of Persona.

A returning theme was technology and the occult colliding in the modern world, taking this as the inspiration for a non-human lead character. Contrasting against the dystopian themes of the original Soul Hackers, the team opted for a story showing commonality between fighting groups and how a non-human being would view and interact with them. Hirata wanted to explore the conflict between Yatagerasu, the Phantom Society and freelancers, which previously had not seen much detailed explanation. Originally Ringo was not the player character, instead being an important secondary character similar to Nemissa from Soul Hackers. This caused storytelling problems, so she was made the lead protagonist, with the other characters rewritten in consequence. She was also made a more active participant in events than previous Megami Tensei protagonists, and the playable cast were all given in-depth stories tying into the conflicts between Summoner clans. Another dropped concept was a parallel setting similar to the Metaverse of Persona 5. Ringo and Figue were given strong personalities so players could better connect with them.

The character designs were created by manga artist Shirow Miwa, who was a fan of the Devil Summoner series and had created fan art of different characters. While he asked whether he should emulate the designs of Soul Hackers, Miwa was told to design the characters in his own style. The overall art design, including demon redesigns, was directly influenced by Miwa's character designs. The demons were also designed to appear less threatening while retaining established elements, with their redesigns compared by Miyauchi to gyaru fashion. The world design, which used a brighter aesthetic compared to other Megami Tensei, also drew inspiration from the world design of Nier: Automata, which had several superficial similarities to Soul Hackers 2. The environments as a whole were designed around an "urban nightlife" motif to reflect the game's theme of demons in the modern day. The Summoner-exclusive areas were directly inspired by the Continental Hotel from the John Wick movie series.

=== Music ===
The music for Soul Hackers 2 was handled by music studio Monaca. The soundtrack was collaboratively composed and arranged by Keiichi Okabe, Keigo Hoashi, Kuniyuki Takahashi, Shotaro Seo, Oliver Good and Keita Inoue. The opening theme "Hopeless Call" was composed by Okabe, with lyrics by Seo and vocals by singer NAHO. Hirata described Monaca as "the perfect choice" for handling the game's music, due to its theme of clashing ideals and the meeting of technology and magic. Monaca were provided with setting information and character art to help inform the music's style and tone. A three-disc soundtrack album was released on October 22, 2022.

== Release ==
Soul Hackers 2 was announced in February 2022 for PlayStation 4, PlayStation 5, Windows (via Steam and Microsoft Store), Xbox One, and Xbox Series X/S. The ports to Windows and Xbox platforms were handled by Artdink. The game did not use the Devil Summoner moniker. Hirata attributed this to a combination of focusing on the game's themes, making it easier for newcomers to approach, and making the title easier to say. The game launched in Japan on August 25 that year, and overseas the following day. The release coincided with the 25th anniversary of Soul Hackers. The game features English and Japanese audio, with English, French, Italian, German, Spanish, Japanese, Korean, and Chinese subtitles. The game was published by Atlus in Japan, and by Sega in territories worldwide. The localization was handled by Atlus West, with Christian La Monte as English voice director. The opening cinematic was published online on August 18. Atlus published streaming guidelines for the game in early October, allowing streaming and video recording of the game's contents as long as spoiler warnings were included in descriptions.

The digital versions launched with Standard, Digital Deluxe, and Digital Premium Editions, with additional items for each Edition tier. In Japan, the game's release was also accompanied by a Soul Hackers 25th Anniversary Special Edition Box Set for the PlayStation versions of the game, featuring commemorative packaging, an art book featuring concept illustrations, setting art and various staff interviews, an arrangement album featuring modern compositions of songs from the original Soul Hackers, and a Jack Frost mascot figurine. Several pieces of themed merchandise were also sold by Atlus after the game's release, including stickers and keychains. A North American collector's edition had similar items to the Japanese 25th Anniversary Edition.

The game also came with various types of downloadable content (DLC). As a pre-order exclusive bonus, all editions came with costumes and music based on Persona 5. The different Editions came with a self-contained story campaign dubbed "The Lost Numbers", an extra difficulty level, booster items, additional demons, costume and music packs based on other Megami Tensei titles included the original Soul Hackers, and two additional costumes for the Digital Premium Edition. All DLC outside the Digital Premium outfits were available for purchase separately. At launch, the game received a day one patch, which added camera configuration options. An additional update was released in November 2022, adding a "dash" for running in dungeons, a "Speed Up" mode that makes the battle animations faster, and four new demons, among other adjustments.

== Reception ==
Reception

Aggregate score
| Aggregator | Score |
|---|---|
| Metacritic | 77/100 (XSX); 74/100 (PS5); 71/100 (PS4); 70/100 (PC) |

Review scores
| Publication | Score |
|---|---|
| Destructoid | 8.5/10 |
| Digital Trends | 3/5 |
| Famitsu | 38/40 |
| GameSpot | 7/10 |
| IGN | 7/10 |
| RPGamer | 4/5 |
| RPGFan | 73% |
| VentureBeat | 3/5 |

Soul Hackers 2 generally received "mixed or average reviews" according to review aggregator website Metacritic, with the Xbox Series X/S version receiving "generally favorable reviews". Reviewers were critical of the game's originality. IGN reviewer Cameron Hawkins called the story and characters engaging, but found the level design "uninspired". Similarly Jason McMaster of VentureBeat said "The overall problem isn't that it's a bad game — it just doesn't do much to stand out." Destructoid's Chris Carr commented that the design of the game's dungeons were "samey", but had found the game had retained his interest.

Willa Rowe of Inverse said that the DLC was enjoyable but was essentially necessary for a good experience with the base content, bringing more gameplay variety to the otherwise repetitive dungeons.

=== Sales ===
During its debut week, an estimated 51,800 physical units of the game were sold in Japan. The PlayStation 4 version, which was the third highest-selling retail game of the week in the country, accounted for about 31,600 of the Japanese opening sales, while the PlayStation 5 version was the fifth highest-selling and accounted for the remaining 20,200. According to the NPD Group, Soul Hackers 2 was the 15th best-selling title of August 2022, and the third-highest new release after Madden NFL 23 and the Saint's Row reboot. Although Famitsu considered the Japanese debut sales good, Sega revealed in their November 2022 quarterly fiscal report that the game was struggling to meet sales expectations, but would continue to be supported in the hope of longer-term sales success.
