= Devil Summoner: Soul Hackers =

1997 video game

- Nintendo 3DS cover art, featuring Nemissa in front of the Spookies
- Developer: Atlus
- Publishers: JP: Atlus; NA: Atlus USA; PAL: NIS America
- Directors: Kouji Okada; Kazuyuki Yamai (3DS)
- Designer: Katsura Hashino
- Artists: Shigenori Soejima; Kazuma Kaneko
- Writers: Shogo Isogai; Masumi Suzuki; Yusuke Gonda
- Composers: Shoji Meguro; Toshiko Tasaki; Tsukasa Masuko; Ryota Kozuka (3DS)
- Series: Devil Summoner; Megami Tensei
- Platforms: Sega Saturn; PlayStation; Nintendo 3DS
- Release: Sega Saturn; Original; JP: November 13, 1997; Akuma Zensho Dainishuu; JP: December 23, 1997; PlayStation; JP: April 8, 1999; Nintendo 3DS; JP: August 30, 2012; NA: April 16, 2013; EU: September 20, 2013; AU: September 26, 2013
- Genre: Role-playing
- Mode: Single-player

Devil Summoner: Soul Hackers (Note: Japanese: Debiru Samanā: Sōru Hakkāzu (デビルサマナー ソウル ハッカーズ), released outside Japan as Shin Megami Tensei – Devil Summoner: Soul Hackers and commonly referred to as simply Soul Hackers) is a 1997 role-playing video game developed by Atlus. The game is the second installment in the Devil Summoner series, itself a part of the larger Megami Tensei franchise. Originally published by Atlus for the Sega Saturn, it was later ported to the PlayStation in 1999 and Nintendo 3DS in 2012.

Soul Hackers takes place in the fictional Amami City, a technologically advanced Japanese metropolis. The main protagonist, a member of a hacker group called the Spookies, gains access to the closed beta for Paradigm X, an online game designed to connect the citizens of Amami. While in there, the protagonist encounters supernatural forces, then must work with the Spookies to investigate attacks by demons across the city. Aiding him is Nemissa, a demon who possesses the body of his friend Hitomi Tono.

Development of Soul Hackers began in 1996, after the success of the original Devil Summoner. Original producer Kouji Okada and character designer Kazuma Kaneko returned to their respective roles. The first two versions of Soul Hackers were never released overseas, but the Nintendo 3DS version was localized into English. The game has generally garnered a positive reception, although some reviewers criticized the visuals and music. A sequel titled Soul Hackers 2 was released in August 2022.

== Gameplay ==
A battle against two enemy demons; the player's party, consisting of the protagonist, Nemissa and two allied demons, is shown near the bottom.

Soul Hackers is a role-playing video game. Players navigate dungeons in a first person view, in which they solve puzzles and fight enemy demons in turn-based battles. The player always has one or two human characters in their party, and also has the ability to summon up to four demons who fight on the player's side. Players get access to demons by choosing to speak to enemy demons, and negotiating with them; negotiations can involve answering questions, intimidating the demons, or giving them items they want. Players are able to fuse several of their allied demons into one single demon; the resulting demon inherits abilities from the demons that were used to produce it.

In battles, players have to manage allied demons differently depending on their personalities, their alignments, and their abilities: for instance, friendly demons prefer to use healing or defensive magic, while sly demons prefer to attack enemies on their own. If players give a demon an order to use an ability it does not want to use, there is a risk that it will refuse and do something else instead, or that it does not do anything at all. Demons with differing alignments can refuse to co-operate with each other. In order to prevent this, players can build up the loyalty of their allied demons; this is done by giving them gifts or letting them choose their actions in battle on their own. By participating in battles, or by trading for it at a special market place, players are able to get magnetite, which is used as fuel for demons; if players run out of magnetite, any currently summoned allied demons start to take damage.

== Plot ==
=== Setting and characters ===
The game takes place in the small fictitious harbour town Amami City in Japan. The company Algon Soft has made Amami its headquarters, which has led to the technology in the city quickly being upgraded; Algon Soft has connected every home and business in the city to its new network in order to demonstrate how a "city of tomorrow" could work. The Japanese government is impressed, and grants Algon Soft permission to expand the network across the rest of Japan in the coming years. It also takes place in the virtual world Paradigm X on Algon Soft's servers, where the citizens of Amami can visit virtual attractions.

The player character is a young man who is a member of the hacking group Spookies, which was founded by a man who calls himself Spooky. The other group members are Six, Lunch, Yu-Ichi, and the player character's friend Hitomi Tono. The group mainly hacks the city's network for fun or to play harmless pranks, but Spooky holds a grudge against Algon Soft. Among other recurring characters are the demon Nemissa, who possesses Hitomi, and Kinap, who teaches the player character to enter the souls of people who have recently died.

== Development ==
Devil Summoner: Soul Hackers is the second entry in the Devil Summoner series, which forms part of the larger Megami Tensei series: as with other entries, its narrative takes the form of a modern-day detective story as opposed to the series' more prevalent post-apocalyptic settings. Soul Hackers began development in 1996 after the commercial and critical success of the original Devil Summoner. Original producer Kouji Okada, and character and demon designer Kazuma Kaneko returned to their respective roles. The initial concept was thought up based on the internet boom fuelled by the recently released Windows 95 operating system: Okada and Kaneko saw the potential dangers of the internet being used as means of control and the crisis that ensued when something went wrong with a widely used system. The initial world view was created by Kaneko, while writer Shogo Isogai was responsible for the detailed story scenes. A lot of work went into properly balancing the gameplay. Future Persona character designer Shigenori Soejima was responsible for sub-character designs, item graphics, and designing the main character's dialogue portraits. Instead of restricting the narrative to a single perspective as with earlier Megami Tensei games, the team experimented with detailing different protagonists' points of view. For some of his character designs, Kaneko incorporated a "devil" motif into their clothing: he would later use similar design motifs for the character Isamu in Shin Megami Tensei III: Nocturne. Kaneko's design for Nemissa was inspired her depiction as a self-centered childlike character.

The main protagonist was not a trained Summoner as opposed to the first Devil Summoner, but his use of the GUMP symbolised the passing of responsibilities related to the Kuzunoha line. Amani City was not based on any real city: it was born from Okada's wish to create a city on the opposite side of Japan to the main setting of the first Devil Summoner, and from the concept of a futuristic city. Their initial version of Amani City was much smaller than the version in the final game. The character of Kinap was incorporated due to Kaneko's interpretation of the representation of Native Americans in North American movies, where they seemed both spiritual and upright. His Japanese name, "Redman", was a symbolic representation of his origins. The main antagonist Manitou was drawn from the similarly titled Native American concept, which to Isogai was analogous to major deities from other religions including the Abrahamic God: its human shape represented the extent to which humanity had warped it. Multiple other elements of Native American folklore were also included. The character of Dr. Victor, a helper from Devil Summoner, was brought back in a redesigned form, along with new assistant Mary. Her gradual "awakening" to consciousness through her questline was compared by Kaneko to the attainment of gnosis. The music was composed by Shoji Meguro, Toshiko Tasaki and Tsukasa Masuko. For his work, Meguro focused on emphasizing the game's cyberpunk setting and haunting atmosphere, creating the effect by hybridizing jazz and techno styles. Meguro composed around fifty pieces for the game, and was given less creative freedom than his work on Maken X. He also had far less memory space to work with, which he felt cheapened the effect. The project as a whole was exhausting for him.

== Release ==
Soul Hackers released for the Sega Saturn on November 13, 1997. A supplementary disc titled Devil Summoner: Soul Hackers - Akuma Zensho 2 released on December 23 of the same year. The disc release contained a postcard entry for a draw from one of 1000 copies of an extra dungeon. Due to its popularity, a port to the PlayStation was released on April 8, 1999. A version for Sony's budget series release following on July 27, 2000. The PlayStation port contained additional features including new story events, added features such as a Paradigm X casino, and a version of the Devil Zensho 2 dungeon.

A port to the Nintendo 3DS was announced in 2012 for release on August 30 of that year. Directed by Kazuyuki Yamai, the port was based on the PlayStation version while featuring further enhancements and adjustments, including full voice acting and gameplay elements unique to the platform. Masayuki Doi designed a new demon for the game, while Eiji Ishida acted as art director. Original writers Masumi Suzuki and Yusuke Gonda returned to write new material. A new opening movie was produced by animation studio Satelight, who had become famous in Japan through their work on Macross Frontier. The opening's theme song, "#X", was written by Yamai and incorporated the themes and motifs of Soul Hackers. The song was composed and arranged by Ryota Kozuka, and translated into English by Toshihiro Takeuchi. Singer Wink Wink both sung the song and assisted with the translation. The port released digitally on the Nintendo eShop on December 25, 2014.

The game was announced for a North American release in December 2012 for the following year, adopting the Shin Megami Tensei moniker. It was published on April 16, 2013, by Atlus USA. It later released as a digital download on July 2. Soul Hackers was one of ten original Megami Tensei titles to be rated "M for Mature" by the Entertainment Software Rating Board. In Europe, the game was published by NIS America. Originally announced for release on September 13, 2013, it was later pushed back a week to September 20. Its digital release came the following week on September 25. In 2021, Atlus' parent company Sega Sammy Holdings listed Soul Hackers as one of several "dormant" intellectual properties that could be considered for getting remastered, remade, or rebooted.

=== Localization ===
The Saturn and PlayStation versions of Soul Hackers have never seen an official release outside Japan. While attempts were made to localize the PlayStation version, it was apparently prevented from coming overseas due to Sony of America's content approval policy. The 3DS version was the first time the game was released outside Japan. The localization was done by Atlus USA: the main staff were made up of project leader Sammy Matsushima, editors Mike Meeker and Clayton Chan, and QA lead Rob Stone. As Soul Hackers had never seen a western release, the team decided to treat it like a new game rather than a traditional port, so they could do full justice to the story. The translation took a little over a month, while the entire localization process to release took around eight months. While the story was mainly serious, the team did their best to introduce elements of humor as with the Japanese script. In the process, they sometimes needed to substitute a joke which would have not translated well from Japanese, or add something on their own account such as a bit of fourth-wall breaking by Yu-Ichi that was not in the original script. Despite the game's awkward English title, the team decided that it fitted the title best in the circumstances.

The team, fans of cyberpunk fiction, easily picked up on the game's stylistic influences. When the dialogue became more technical, they were able to use their knowledge about computers to ensure dialogue did not sound "amateurish". There were times during these segments when the staff needed to suppress their natural reactions when seeing Soul Hacker's fantastic vision of future technology: they compared the experience to viewing an old filmreel about potential future technical developments. The English version featured slightly less voicework than the Japanese release: according to Atlus staff, the cut voicework was for NPCs on the world map, which were voiced by the same two actors and thus sounded "pretty ridiculous". The decision also saved costs from the additional casting and studio recording time that would have been needed to address this issue. When creating both clear and subtle disconnects between Nemissa and Hitomi, the most obvious difference was the use of two different actresses. They also gave Nemissa a more extroverted tone and a ghostly reverberation when compared to the reserved, normal-sounding Hitomi. Nemissa's habit of referring to herself in the third person was carried over from the Japanese script.

== Reception ==
Reception

Aggregate score
Aggregator	Score
Metacritic	3DS: 74/100

Review scores
Publication	Score
Destructoid	8.5/10
Famitsu	SSAT: 9/10, 9/10, 9/10, 7/10; PS: 9/10, 9/10, 9/10, 8/10; 3DS: 8/10, 9/10, 7/10, 8/10
Game Informer	8.75/10
IGN	7.8/10
Polygon	7.5/10
RPGFan	3DS: 89%

The 3DS version of Soul Hackers has received "mixed or average reviews" according to the review aggregator website Metacritic. Several critics enjoyed the game's battles. Danielle Riendau at Polygon, Joe Czop at RPGFan and Kimberley Wallace at Game Informer all liked how challenging the battles are: Riendau said that boss battles require careful experimentation and tactical analysis, and that the finishing battles always feels rewarding due to their difficulty; and Wallace said that larger battles give an adrenaline rush and make her think and study her party each turn. Both Riendau and Chris Charter at Destructoid liked the demon negotiation dialogue, and Wallace liked how the negotiations add further depth to the battles.

The dungeons were less appreciated: Riendau said that they consist of "staring at the same bland and blurry wall textures for hours at a time", and that it gets monotonous, especially in the larger late-game dungeons that require backtracking. Wallace said that Soul Hackers made it clear that dungeon design was not at its peak in 1997; she called the dungeons bland, and that most locations the player visits are unexciting, with a few exceptions such as the art museum where the player enters paintings. Unlike Riendau, she did not think it was monotonous to backtrack through dungeons, due to the possibility of talking one's way out of a battles. Famitsu appreciated how the map and difficulty settings made it easy for new players to get into the dungeon exploration.

Riendau liked the setting and presentation, calling it reminiscent of science fiction anime from the late 1990s. Wallace said that the concept of exploring a cyberpunk city is not new, but that she liked the game's atmosphere; Jeremy Parish at IGN also liked this, and found the mixture of cyberpunk and mysticism fascinating. Famitsu thought the visuals felt outdated, but called the story stimulating. Czop liked the story, especially the vision quests, but thought that the Spookies members, while appearing often, do not develop as characters through their dialogue. Charter and Wallace also liked the story, but disagreed about the Spookies: Charter called them timeless characters, praising Hitomi and Nemissa as good enough to carry the whole story; and Wallace called the dialogue between Hitomi and Nemissa well written, and liked the story's focus on the importance of family. Riendau commented on the effeminate character Beta, calling him a "gross stereotype" and saying that he distracts from the game.

Czop was disappointed in the game's music: he said that it was fitting in each area it was played in, but also that it was mediocre and "not particularly memorable". Charter said that the music is not the best in the genre, but that it fit the game's mood. Parish was more critical, saying that the music sounded like if it were "performed on a digital chainsaw".

=== Sales ===
Upon its release, Soul Hackers sold 160,850 units in its first week. As of 2000, the game had sold 320,887, becoming the 27th best-selling Saturn title in Japan. The PlayStation port sold 137,458 units by the end of 1999, becoming the 114th best-selling game of that year. In its debut week, the 3DS port sold 69,365 units and debuted at #2 behind Hatsune Miku: Project DIVA F for the PlayStation Vita. This was noted as being a good performance for a port of such an old game, and outdid the opening sales of Shin Megami Tensei: Devil Survivor for the Nintendo DS. In the following two weeks in Media Create's top fifteen games chart, the game moved down to #9 and then #17, selling 12,589 and 5,910 units respectively, creating total sales of 87,865. By October of that year, Atlus reported that the game had sold over 90,000 units: this put it ahead of that year's PSP port of Persona 2: Eternal Punishment, but behind Etrian Odyssey IV: Legends of the Titan. According to a report by the NPD Group in January 2014, Soul Hackers had sold 36,000 units in the United States during 2013.

== Legacy ==
=== Sequels ===
The mobile game Devil Summoner: Soul Hackers – Intruder was released exclusively in Japan on August 30, 2007. The gameplay tactical role-playing with adventure game elements, carrying over elements of Soul Hackers into a mobile format. Another mobile game set in a virtual world, Devil Summoner: Soul Hackers – New Generation, was released on July 22, 2008.

A sequel, Soul Hackers 2, was released for the PlayStation 4, PlayStation 5, Xbox One, Xbox Series X/S, and Windows on August 25, 2022, in Japan, and on August 26 outside of Japan. Set in the near future, it follows agents of the supernatural being Aion gathering a party of summoners to defeat an approaching evil force.

=== Media adaptations ===
The original game received a manga adaptation, written by Fumio Sasahara and illustrated by Kazumi Takasawa. It was released in two volumes in March and August 1999 by Kadokawa Shoten. It also received two novel spin-offs; Devil Summoner Soul Hackers: Death City Korin by Osamu Makino in April 1998 from Aspect Books, and Devil Summoner Soul Hackers: Nightmare of the Butterfly by Shinya Kasai in May 1999 from Famitsu Bunko.
