= Matador (Megami Tensei) =

Shin Megami Tensei demon

- Megami Tensei character
- Matador art by Kazuma Kaneko
- First game: Shin Megami Tensei II (1994)
- Designed by: Kazuma Kaneko

Matador is a demon in the Megami Tensei series, first appearing in Shin Megami Tensei II (1994). It is a skeleton dressed like a matador wielding a sword and muleta. He later appears in the updated version of Shin Megami Tensei III: Nocturne (the version released outside of Japan), being the recipient of a special candelabra from Lucifer. He challenges the protagonist, Demi-Fiend, for his candelabra, ultimately being defeated. He has also appeared in other games, including the Persona series.

The Matador boss fight in Nocturne has been considered one of the most difficult in video games, with multiple critics identifying it as a teaching moment for players to understand the importance of using stat increases on themselves and decreases on their opponents to win. It received criticism for being a too difficult fight too early, while some critics stated that the fight was not as difficult if the player used buffs and debuffs.

== Appearances ==
Matador first appeared in the 1994 video game Shin Megami Tensei II, where it is both an enemy and a recruitable demon. Matador appeared in the updated release of Shin Megami Tensei III: Nocturne, Nocturne Maniax, in Japan, which released in North America as the original name. The protagonist, the Demi-Fiend, is given a special candelabra by Lucifer, disguised as a man in a wheelchair, as well as 10 others, including Matador. Matador attempts to prevent the Demi-fiend from progressing to Ikebukuro, stating that he is too weak to possess the candelabra and challenging him to combat. This version was later remastered as Shin Megami Tensei III: Nocturne HD Remaster, which made the fight easier on the new "Merciful" difficulty mode. Matador later appears as a boss in both Shin Megami Tensei V and its expanded version, Shin Megami Tensei V: Vengeance. Outside of mainline entries, he appears in the MMORPG Shin Megami Tensei: Imagine and the mobile game Shin Megami Tensei: Liberation Dx2. Matador also appears in the Persona spin-off series, including Persona 3 Reload, Persona 4 Golden, and Persona 5.

== Concept and creation ==
Matador was designed by Kazuma Kaneko. Matador is a demon belonging to the Fiend class of demons, noted for having a high degree of arrogance and showmanship. He is a skeleton dressed like a matador, featuring a sword and a muleta. Matador has various abilities he can use in combat, including Red Capote, which increases his evasion to its maximum limit. In Shin Megami Tensei V: Vengeance, Red Capote also increases accuracy. He also uses wind/Force magic.

== Reception ==
Matador has been regarded by critics as one of the most difficult boss fights in video games. Author Ludovic Castro stated that most players were "traumatized" by their encounter with Matador, believing that almost every player must have lost their first encounter with him. He stated that the battle becomes much easier once the player figures out the optimal strategy to deal with him, comparing the battle with Matador to Minotaur and Medusa in Shin Megami Tensei IV, other bosses that require preparation to win against. GameSpot writer Matthew Walden regarded Nocturne as both a fun and particularly difficult video game, stating that "True Demon Run Matador Battle" may be "one of the most horrific phrases in the video game lexicon". Vice writer Renata Price identified the Matador as Nocturne's "notorious boss". She stated that his lack of weakness and ability to move twice in battle made it seem impossible, it served as a lesson to how to overcome challenges that the player had not faced before. Fellow Vice writer Patrick Klepek stated that Matador served as the first roadblock of the game, resulting in him no longer playing the game after losing several times. He felt that, for as well-known as the "legend of Matador" was at the game's release, it's only become more prominent since. Digitally Downloaded writer Matt Sainsbury stated that Matador was his favorite boss fight from a Japanese role-playing game, and that he believes he was "Stockholm Syndromed" into liking him so much due to how challenging he was in Nocturne. Following the announcement of the Nocturne remaster, numerous articles were published exclaiming how funny the idea of new players experiencing Matador was. Den-fami Nico Gamer writer Leyvan felt that Matador was the most memorable of the demons introduced in the Maniax version of Nocturne and the most difficult fight in the game.

Game Developer writer Josh Bycer stated that while the fight may seem difficult for this part of the game, he felt that if the player could not learn any lessons from the fight with Matador, the game would prove more difficult. He stated that he originally grinded up his demons' levels to beat Matador, which burnt him out on the rest of the game. On his second attempt at the game, he strategized by bringing demons who resisted his wind magic, which resulted in the fight only taking two minutes. RPGFan writer Mike Sollosi felt that the battle was a teaching moment for players about the value of stat boosting. stating that while the game does not tell you the value of stat boosting directly, but that it demonstrates it with the Matador fight. Despite this, he found the challenge to be too high for the point the player was in the game. TheGamer writer Scott Baird believed that the Matador fight in Nocturne had earned a reputation for being unfair, identifying it as a particularly difficult encounter in Nocturne. He attributed the reputation in part to the fact that Nocturne was the first Shin Megami Tensei game released outside of Japan, resulting in people not understanding the combat system well enough. In her ranking of the hardest role-playing game bosses, fellow TheGamer writer Jouanna Bondakji stated that while people claim the difficulty was exaggerated, what made him so difficult was how early the fight was in the game. Gaming Bolt writer Will Borger believed that Nocturne did a poor job of teaching the player how to play the game, stating that he could easily believe players would either get bored before the Matador fight or quitting out of frustration. He felt that the game did not prepare players for how to defeat him. Matador's appearance in Shin Megami Tensei V: Vengeance as a boss was described by Kotaku writer Timothy Monbleau as being similarly infamous to his Nocturne appearance.
