= Shin Megami Tensei V =

2021 video game

- Original cover art depicting the protagonist in Nahobino form with angels and demons
- Developer: Atlus
- Publisher: Sega (Note: Nintendo published the original Nintendo Switch version in Europe.): JP: Atlus
- Director: Shigeo Komori
- Producer: Shinjiro Takata
- Designer: Masaru Watanabe
- Programmer: Yoshiki Oyamada
- Artists: Masayuki Doi; Hiroshi Sasazu
- Writer: Yoh Haduki
- Composers: Ryota Kozuka; Toshiki Konishi
- Series: Megami Tensei
- Engine: Unreal Engine 4
- Platforms: Nintendo Switch; PlayStation 4; PlayStation 5; Windows; Xbox One; Xbox Series X/S
- Release: Nintendo Switch: JP: November 11, 2021; WW: November 12, 2021; Vengeance; NS, PS4, PS5, Windows, Xbox One, Series X/S: WW: June 14, 2024
- Genre: Role-playing
- Mode: Single-player

Shin Megami Tensei V (Note: Japanese: 真・女神転生V; "True Goddess Reincarnation V") is a 2021 role-playing video game developed by Atlus, originally for Nintendo Switch. It is the fifth mainline entry in the Shin Megami Tensei series, the central series in the Megami Tensei franchise. It was published by Atlus in Japan, Sega in North America, and Nintendo in Europe. The game follows a high school student drawn into Da'at, a post-apocalyptic realm inhabited by warring factions of angels and demons after Lucifer kills the Creator and triggers a conflict over who will remake the world. The story has multiple endings dictated by moral choices and alliances. The gameplay features free-roaming exploration of Da'at, a turn-based battle system based on exploiting weaknesses, and a system allowing the Nahobino to recruit and fuse demons to fight alongside them.

Production of Shin Megami Tensei V began in 2016, with the aim being to blend elements from Shin Megami Tensei III: Nocturne and Shin Megami Tensei IV. Returning staff included planner Kazuyuki Yamai, artist Masayuki Doi, and composers Ryota Kozuka and Toshiki Konishi. Production was prolonged due to using the Unreal Engine and developing for the Switch. Journalists praised the gameplay design and graphics, but faulted aspects of its story and technical performance. The original release sold over 1.1 million units worldwide by 2022.

An expanded version for eighth and ninth generation consoles and Windows, Shin Megami Tensei V: Vengeance, was released in 2024 by Atlus in Japan and Sega worldwide. In addition to expanding and refining the gameplay, new storyline elements were introduced, and some planned or cut content was used. Vengeance met with critical acclaim from journalists, with praise going to the new story campaign, gameplay adjustments, and improved technical performance. Vengeance sold over 500,000 copies within three days of release.

== Gameplay ==
A combat encounter in Shin Megami Tensei V, which includes a gameplay menu (left) and player character information (right) as part of the heads-up display.

Shin Megami Tensei V is a role-playing video game in which the player controls the Nahobino, a fusion of human and demon who explores the post-apocalyptic realm of Da'at. Da'at is fully explorable and divided into open areas with different environmental themes and enemies. In Da'at, the Nahobino can run around as normal, dash at great speed, jump, and slash at objects or enemies with the Nahobino's sword. The Nahobino can find friendly non-playable characters (NPCs) who have dialogue and can provide quests, hidden beings called Miman which grant an upgrade currency called Glory, and small orbs which restore health (HP), magic (MP), and the special Magatsuhi gauge. In some areas, a companion character will lead the Nahobino to items and treasure. Completing quests rewards experience points which raise character levels, and the in-game currency Macca. Some areas are blocked off by Demon Abscesses, growths with demon mobs which must be destroyed to progress.

Within Da'at, enemy demons roam the open areas, and can be engaged to begin combat, with the Nahobino able to strike first to get the first round of combat. The game uses the series' recurring turn-based combat, dubbed the Press Turn System. The player party is made up of the Nahobino and up to three allied demons, with each side taking turns to perform actions including a standard physical attack; using skills that can attack, heal, or alter character statistics positively or negatively; guarding, using an item, or escaping from battle. An important element of battle is the "Press Turn": striking an weakness or landing a critical attack grants an additional turn, while missing or voiding an attack removes a turn. A new addition is Magatsuhi Skills, activated when the Magatsuhi Gauge is full and able to be used without using up a Press Turn icon. Magatsuhi Skills grant a skill to the party for a single round of battle, with effects including guaranteed critical hits and full healing. Demons can be swapped or summoned in exchange for a turn, and the player hits a game over if the Nahobino dies. Completing battles rewards Macca, experience points and items.

The Nahobino can recruit demons during battle by talking to them via Demon Negotiation, and giving the right responses to questions based on a demon's personality type. After answering their questions, the demon may ask for items, money, or HP or MP from the Nahobino, and successfully bargaining prompts to demon to join. Demon behavior and responses are influenced by the current Moon Phase, with the full moon preventing Negotiation while the new moon makes Negotiation easier. Only demons of a lower level than the Nahobino can be successfully recruited, although higher-level demons will remember successful negotiations and join the party when the Nahobino's level has surpassed them.

Leyline Founts scattered through Da'at are used to save progress, and access a shop to buy and sell items, and the World of Shadows where Demon Fusion is performed. Fusion entails using between two and four demons to create a new stronger demon: demons logged in the Demon Compendium can be summoned for a Macca fee for use in fusion or the party. Reverse Fusion allows the selection of a desired Fusion based on current demon stock, while random Fusion accidents produce a different demon from that predicted. Alongside standard fusion, items called Demon Essences can be used to grant new skills and traits to both the Nahobino and demons, and spend Glory to purchase permanent boons called Miracles with effects including lowering Fusion costs or granting additional skill slots for the Nahobino and demons party members.

The expanded version Vengeance, alongside having a larger roster of demons and a new storyline route, adds new gameplay elements. Rest spots called Demon Haunts allow the Nahobino to speak with demons in their party, with some offering side quests and boosting the Nahobino's statistics. Traversal across Da'at is expanded with Magatsu Rails, grind rails connecting different areas or leading to secret locations with enemies and collectables. Demon navigators can be used to hunt for items outside of story sequences. Consecutive battles can be triggered if other demon groups are near an attacked enemy. Human characters can now join as party members in combat, having an assigned demon that dictates their abilities and strengths. If certain demons are held by in the Nahobino's stock, a special attack combining their powers can be used on enemies. There is also the ability to save progress anywhere in the environment, and trigger an overhead view of areas to help with navigation.

== Synopsis ==
=== Setting and characters ===
The events of Shin Megami Tensei V are divided between two settings: modern-day Tokyo and a post-apocalyptic landscape called Da'at. Da'at was originally an alternate version of Tokyo destroyed in a war between the Angels, who follow the Creator, and the demons, who are loyal to the fallen angel Lucifer. Before the game's opening, Lucifer kills the Creator, triggering a power vacuum where other deities, robbed of their Knowledge by the Creator, seek to regain it and ascend the Throne of Creation. The Bethel Organization, an alliance of polytheistic divine beings and human operatives from across the world, protects the real world from Da'at's influence. With Vengeance, the story splits into two branches: the "Canon of Creation", which is the original storyline, and the "Canon of Vengeance" with altered events. The storyline is influenced by in-game dialogue choices.

The game's silent protagonist is a high school student who is drawn into Da'at, and through fusion with the artificial Proto-Fiend Aogami, becomes the Nahobino, a demon-like being who has regained their divine Knowledge. Multiple supporting characters represent the game's moral alignments: the friendly but dim-witted Ichiro Dazai represents "Law", Bethel agent Yuzuru Atsuta represents "Chaos", while the rogue Shohei Yakumo and his demon companion Nüwa represent "Neutrality".

Supporting characters include Tao Isonokami, Bethel's mystical Saint; Yuzuru's shy younger sister, Miyazu Atsuta; and Sahori Itsukishima, a bullied fellow student. Supernatural representatives are the angel Abdiel, who remains devoted to the Creator, Hayao Koshimizu, Bethel Japan's leader, and the human form of Tsukuyomi, and Lahmu, an antagonistic fallen deity. Vengeance adds Yoko Hiromine, an independent Saint; the Qadištu, a group of female demons composed of Naamah, Eisheth, Agrat, and their leader Lilith: and the angel Mastema.

=== Plot ===
Coming home from school one day, the protagonist and Dazai are pulled into Da'at, where Aogami saves the protagonist from a demon attack by merging with him, becoming a Nahobino. After escaping from Da'at and returning to Tokyo, he and Dazai are met by Yuzuru, who, together with Koshimizu, recruits them into Bethel, where they keep demons from leaving Da'at. The protagonist learns the current version of Tokyo is not the true one, but a copy generated by the Creator when the real Tokyo was swallowed by a supernatural phenomenon, becoming Da'at.

During an attack on the protagonist's school, Miyazu is briefly kidnapped, and Sahori is influenced by Lahmu into killing her bullies and becoming its Nahobino. The protagonist is mortally wounded by Lahmu, but Tao sacrifices herself to revive the protagonist, who then kills Lahmu and Sahori. The protagonist then travels to Chiyoda and kills the leader of the demons, Arioch. During these conflicts, the protagonist frequently crosses paths with Yakumo and Nüwa, who seek to destroy the Throne of Creation and allow humanity to control their future. Afterward, at a meeting with Bethel's branch leader, the Nahobino is revealed to be an existence forbidden by the Creator. Abdiel is defeated when she attacks the protagonist while denying the Creator's death. The other deities, including Koshimizu, dissolve Bethel to recover their Knowledge and ascend the Throne of Creation. Tao is reborn as a goddess who will lead a Nahobino to the Throne of Creation, choosing to guide the protagonist when the false Tokyo collapses and Da'at overwhelms reality. In parallel, Yuzuru unites with Koshimizu to restore the prominence of all deities despite inevitable conflict, while Dazai convinces Abdiel to merge with him and create a conforming world of peace in the Creator's name.

The protagonist gains keys from the former Bethel deities to access the Temple of Eternity, which holds the Throne of Creation. At this point, the protagonist can side with either Dazai or Yuzuru or agree with Yakumo's goal to destroy the Throne; the latter choice causes Tao to abandon him. Regardless of choice, all the other candidates are killed, and the protagonist ascends to the Throne. If the protagonist completes certain side missions and sides with Yakumo, Nüwa reveals an alternate possibility of using the Throne to create a world free of gods and demons, which Tao is willing to support. In all but the ending where the Throne is destroyed, Lucifer grants his Knowledge to the protagonist in a final battle so the new world will potentially be everlasting.

In the Vengeance storyline, Yoko accompanies the protagonist for much of their journey, and the Qadištu interfere with events while gathering power to awaken the goddess Tiamat, whose overthrow by Marduk led to the Throne of Creation's role in managing the world. Sahori falls to an attack by Lilith, Miyazu is briefly kidnapped by Eisheth before finding sanctuary with a sympathetic demon, while Mastema blesses Dazai to fight within Da'at after Agrat spreads a plague of agony. The Qadištu succeed in gathering the required energy and completing Tiamat's summoning by sacrificing the protagonist and themselves. Tiamat's awakening devastates Da'at and kills Nüwa. Tao and Aogami sacrifice themselves to save the protagonist, and Yoko awakens as a goddess carrying Lilith's will to destroy and remake the world free of ruling gods.

In the aftermath, Dazai and Abdiel kill Yuzuru, and Koshimizu merges with the protagonist to restore his Nahobino form. Tao, in her goddess form, guides the protagonist to the Temple of Eternity, seeking to restore and preserve the world while granting everyone a chance at happiness. On the way, he is forced to kill Dazai and Abdiel. Depending on the protagonist's choices during the game, he sides with either Tao or Yoko to support their respective goals. In both routes, Tiamat attacks either at Yoko's or Mastema's command. Aogami is freed from Tiamat and reunites with the protagonist to defeat her, while Koshimizu dies saving the chosen heroine. After a final fight, either with the primal Tehom in Tao's route or Mastema in Yoko's route, the protagonist creates a new world with Lucifer granting his Knowledge as before.

== Development ==
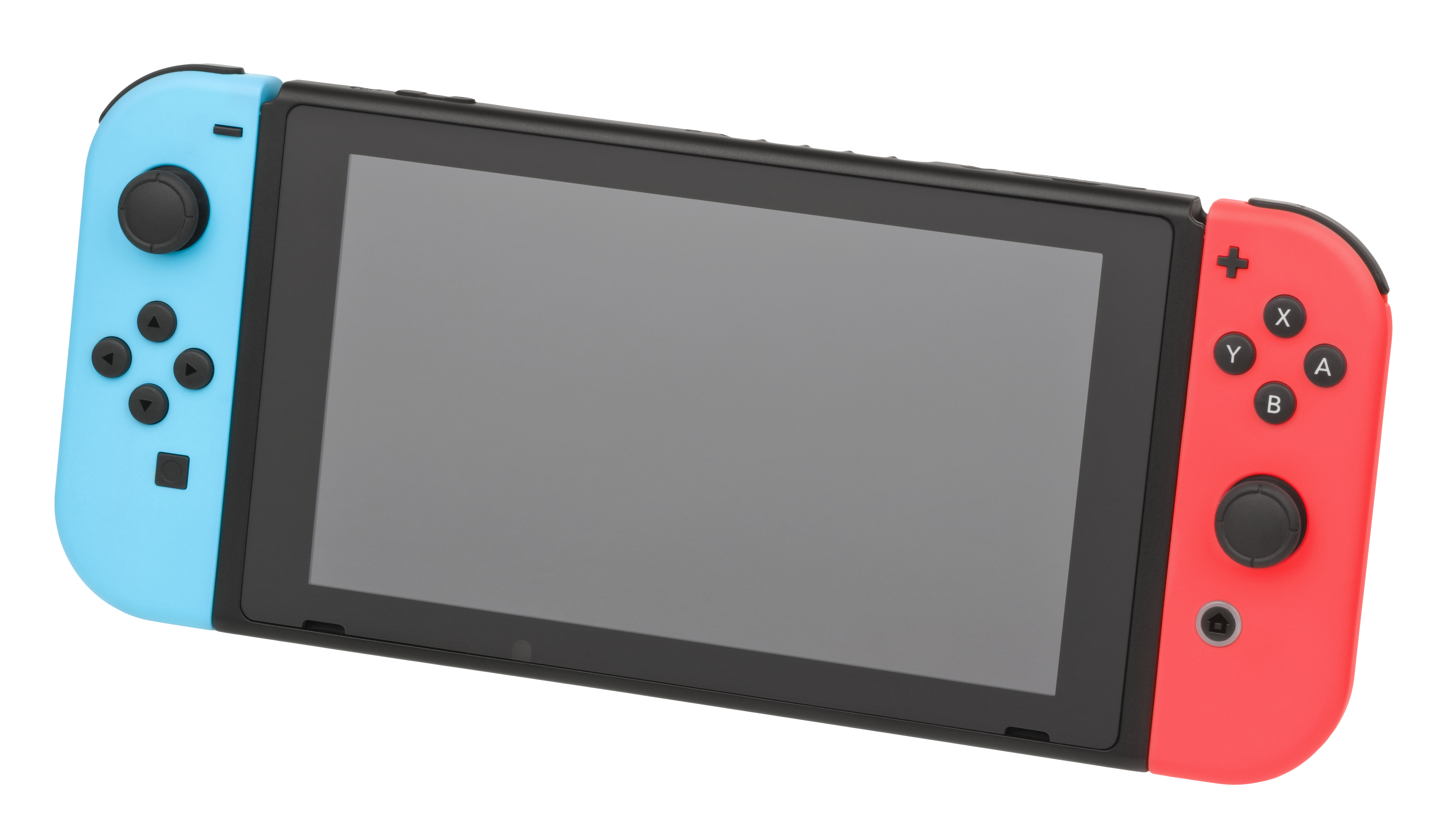
The Nintendo Switch platform was chosen for its portability and its capability for high-definition graphics.

Shin Megami Tensei V began development in 2016 at Megami Tensei developer Atlus. The staff included multiple veterans of earlier Atlus titles. The game plan was created by series veteran Kazuyuki Yamai, while director Shigeo Komori had worked on both the Megami Tensei and Etrian Odyssey series. The producer was Shinjiro Takata, the lead designer was Masaru Watanabe, and the scenario written by Yoh Haduki. Komori wanted to bring all the series' established elements into a game featuring a more graphically vivid world, while Yamai wanted the game's tone and themes to reflect then-recent world events as earlier Shin Megami Tensei titles had done in their time. The setting and storyline were decided upon at an early stage by core staff, but to finish it multiple newer staff members had to be brought on throughout production. Yamai wanted to combine the "thick" content and atmosphere of Shin Megami Tensei III: Nocturne with the portable demon-raising experience of Shin Megami Tensei IV. In February 2018, Yamai described the project as having entered "full-scale development".

The team chose to develop the game for the Nintendo Switch due to it combining high-definition game capabilities with portability. It was the team's first time developing for the Switch, which prolonged the game's development. The game was built using Unreal Engine 4, with the engine being chosen after six months of prototyping and after the Switch had been launched. This was the first time Atlus had outsourced a third-party engine, previously creating Megami Tensei titles on in-house engines. At the time, Epic Games Japan was reaching out to development studios for partners, and Atlus accepted their offer to use Unreal Engine over an in-house engine. Lead programmer Yoshiki Oyamada enjoyed the eventual ease of working with the new tools. Yamai was surprised at the speed of development and graphics rendering in the new engine compared to their in-house development, allowing more time for trial-and-error design. During early production the team were unused to the development tools, choosing the SpriteStudio middleware to create the user interface due to good compatibility with the engine.

The art direction was handled by Hiroshi Sasazu. The characters and demons were designed by Masayuki Doi, who had previously worked on the characters of Shin Megami Tensei IV. Doi's focus for the character designs was to make them realistic and grounded, while the demon characters were made more "alien" to heighten the game's overarching theme of normality being under threat. Doi designed the protagonist during 2016. Inspired by the excitement surrounding the planned Summer Olympics in Japan, Doi wanted his design to be distinctly Japanese. The Nahobino form was intended as a balance between the protagonist's human form and the otherworldly Aogami. For the demon designs, Doi incorporated references to each demon's original mythology, including redesigns for some established demons. Out of his designs, Doi described Nüwa as his favorite due to finding a way of balancing her human and demonic elements.

=== Music ===
The music was co-composed by Ryota Kozuka and Toshiki Konishi; Kozuka had previously worked on Shin Megami Tensei IV and its sequel Apocalypse, while Konishi was known for his work on multiple Megami Tensei spin-off titles. Kozuka described the game as having changed compared to earlier series titles, wanting his music to "keep up" with those changes. Tracks from earlier Shin Megami Tensei titles by Kenichi Tsuchiya and Shoji Meguro were included in arranged forms; Konishi arranged Meguro's tracks related to the guest character Demi-fiend from Nocturne, while Tsuchiya arranged the theme "Battle -Fiend-". A five-disc original soundtrack album was co-published by Atlus and Mastard Records on March 30, 2022. The album was nominated for Best Soundtrack at the Golden Joystick Awards 2024.

== Release ==
Shin Megami Tensei V was revealed in January 2017 as part of Nintendo's unveiling of the Nintendo Switch console in the form of a teaser trailer. Confirmations of its title and a Western release followed later that year. According to Doi, the game was initially planned for release in 2020. The game was released worldwide in November 2021, launching in Japan on November 11, and overseas on November 12. The game was published by Atlus in Japan, Sega in North America, and Nintendo in Europe. In Japan, the game was released in both a standard and limited edition with additional items, and released alongside themed Switch accessories. In the West, it released as both a standard edition, a Steelbook version, and a limited "Fall of Man" version featuring additional themed merchandise.

Localization of the game ran parallel to the game's writing and development, which lead editor John Moralis called both positive due to the need to closely communicate with the team, and challenging due to needing to rewrite or scrap lines. Localizing demon conversations, which was a large task, was split up with different writers assigned different demon groups so there could be consistent running gags between different demons. Translating the main story was a collaborative effort, with regular staff communication to ensure everyone knew how different characters had to talk. Casey Mongillo, who voiced the protagonist in English, kept their delivery "fairly neutral" while allowing for tonal variation. Due to the protagonist's silent role in-story, Mongillo did not know the game's story prior to release. Aogami's voice actor Daman Mills described his line delivery as initially "robotic" without being emotionless, and growing audibly attached to the protagonist over time.

The game was supported by downloadable content. A free day one patch introduced a new easier "Safety" difficulty and the Japanese voice track. The rest of the DLC was available for purchase either individually, or bundled into special editions. Three new demons were released as recruitable allies, and a special quest featured the Demi-fiend from Nocturne and nine associated demons which can be recruited into the party. Another set of DLC featured passive gameplay enhancements including increased experience, adjusted enemy spawns. A patch was released that reduced the number of jumps required in a late-game dungeon, and added camera options and lighting adjustments. On June 13, the original version and its DLC were delisted from digital stores in anticipation of the release of Vengeance.

=== Shin Megami Tensei V: Vengeance ===
Vengeance, an expanded version of the game, featured a new storyline introducing the Qadištu faction.

Following the success of Shin Megami Tensei V, the team wanted to expand the title and series onto other platforms, taking criticism of the original into account. This expanded version, Shin Megami Tensei V: Vengeance, was developed for Switch, PlayStation 4, PlayStation 5, Windows, Xbox One and Xbox Series X/S. Takata and Komori returned respectively as producer and director, and Doi as character and demon designer. The team focused on refining and rebalancing existing elements, such as improving navigation, adding new difficulty levels, adjusting items and demon behaviors, rebalancing level scaling to be fairer to lower-level parties, and adding new gameplay elements.

The new narrative borrowed from a backstory element of an ancient battle between the "Horned God" and the "Serpent" which was part of the overarching scenario but never touched on in-game. While the original narrative used the perspective of the Horned God, the new one would focus on the Serpent. This story decision influenced the overarching theme of vengeance by an oppressed group, and which demons would be added to the new version. In addition to the new campaign, the team added dialogue and quests to the original to flesh out the cast, which had seen criticism by players for a lack of depth. Yoko was planned for the original release but dropped to focus on the other characters. Yoko as a character was intended as a "heroine of chaos" to contrast against Tao. Doi proposed the presence and designs of the Qadištu, drawing on one interpretation of the word as representing an oppressed minority and choosing demons who were associated with ruin and temptation.

Kozuka returned to create new music for Vengeance, estimating that the music had been increased by 80% counting the new tracks for the Vengeance storyline and other additions, including twenty new battle themes. Kozuka described the new scenario's music as "dark and a bit bewitching", stating that he and other members of the Atlus Sound Team remained conscious during development about incorporating the new tracks while maintaining the pre-established musical tone. A soundtrack album was released on June 14.

After being leaked during 2023 and 2024, Vengeance was officially announced February 2024. Initially announced for a worldwide release on June 21, 2024, it was later moved up to June 14. It was published by Atlus in Japan and Sega worldwide. Vengeance includes all the original version's DLC, and two new pieces of DLC featuring two demons: Dagda from Shin Megami Tensei IV: Apocalypse, and new demon Konohana Sakuya. Switch save data cannot be transferred between the original and Vengeance, but having save data from the original allows players to transfer three demons in the Vengeance compendium. Promotional materials included a themed bottle of sake in Japan, and a promotional video featuring the heavy metal band Slipknot.

== Reception ==
Original reception

Aggregate score
Aggregator	Score
Metacritic	84/100

Review scores
Publication	Score
Electronic Gaming Monthly	4/5
Famitsu	9/10, 9/10, 9/10, 9/10
Game Informer	8.25/10
GameSpot	8/10
IGN	8/10
Nintendo Life	9/10
Nintendo World Report	9/10

Shin Megami Tensei V received "generally favorable reviews" according to review aggregate website Metacritic, earning a score of 84 out of 100 based on 103 journalist reviews. The game was nominated for Best Role-Playing Game at The Game Awards 2021, and for Role-Playing Game of the Year at the 25th Annual D.I.C.E. Awards.

Japanese gaming magazine Famitsu praised the gameplay design, with the reviewers applauding its difficulty balance even on the easiest setting, though two of the reviewers had trouble navigating the open areas. Mitch Vogel of Nintendo Life lauded both the new accessibility options in world design and gameplay, and a continued refinement of the Press Turn system. Heidi Kemps of GameSpot praised the combat and noted the sense of accomplishment when defeating a difficult enemy, and Donald Theriault of Nintendo World Report enjoyed exploring Da'at and praised the gameplay systems depth and usability options. IGN's Leana Hafer praised the combat depth and character customization, but disliked the amount of combat grinding required in some areas to advance through the game. Game Informer's Kimberley Wallace also disliked the amount of grinding required, but enjoyed the combat and new exploration elements. Polygon's Diego Nicolás Argüello appreciated the additions to the core combat gameplay, and Mollie L. Patterson of Electronic Gaming Monthly enjoyed the more open exploration and customization options but felt the combat design lacked truly new features. Multiple reviewers pointed out the high combat challenge even on lower difficulty settings.

Argüello described the demon and environmental design as one of the game's most enjoyable features. Kemps gave praised to the "eerie art direction", and Vogel positively noted the high-definition graphics gave the demons a realistic appearance lacking from previous entries. Hafer praised the main character's design and overall art direction, positively noting the demons' designs and animations. Wallace was similarly positive about the reworked designs, and appreciated the environmental design despite navigation difficulties. Patterson praised the overall art and graphical design, but felt the game's performance difficulties on Switch let that element down. Multiple other reviewers noted technical issues, including frame rate drops and graphical glitches. When mentioned, the music and voice acting met with praise, though Wallace felt the soundtrack grew repetitive.

Famitsu positively noted the "mood of a mixture of evil and godliness" in the narrative. Argüello praised the darker tone compared to the Persona series, while Vogel appreciated the more character-focused approached to established series tropes. Theriault praised the lack of sexualization in the main cast, but faulted unspecified "script issues" and the lack of a female playable character. Kemps enjoyed the atmosphere and narrative, but noted long periods where the story did not progress meaningfully. Hafer felt that weak writing and shallow characters undermined the story premise, while Wallace stated that the story suffered from a similar poor execution to earlier Shin Megami Tensei games. Patterson was saddened by the lack of a gripping story, negatively comparing it both to Nocturne and the 2021 remaster of Nier.

Vengeance reception

Aggregate scores
Aggregator	Score
Metacritic	86/100 (Switch); 87/100 (PS5); 90/100 (PC); 92/100 (XBSX)
OpenCritic	97% recommend

Review scores
Publication	Score
Famitsu	9/10, 9/10, 9/10, 9/10
Game Informer	9/10
GameSpot	9/10
IGN	8/10
Nintendo Life	9/10
Nintendo World Report	9/10
TouchArcade	5/5

Vengeance also saw generally positive reviews, with Metacritic assigning scores of 86, 87, 90 and 92 out of 100 to the Switch, PS5, PC and Xbox versions respectively. Famitsu positively highlighted the improved interface and gameplay refinements, with several of the reviewers enjoying the deviations present in the new storyline. TouchArcade's Mikhail Madnani lauded the story additions and improved graphics and technical performance, calling it one of Atlus's best RPGs in recent years. Kemps praised the new narrative despite its close adherence to several of the original release's story beats, and said the new combat and gameplay elements contributed to a more enjoyable experience. Theriault positively noted the gameplay and music additions, citing it as a better enhanced version than the similar Persona 5 Royal, but faulted the prominence of human party members. Vogel described the new storyline as superior to the original, and lauded the additions to the already-strong gameplay and combat. Lucas White of Game Informer appreciated the gameplay enhancements, and enjoyed the new narrative despite not agreeing with earlier criticisms of the original release's story. IGN's Michael Higham praised the improvements to combat and gameplay across both campaigns, but noted continued story weaknesses and stated "as [the game] tries harder to deliver more story, it opens itself up to a few pitfalls along the way."

While otherwise positive about the Switch version of Vengeance, Vogel mentioned continued technical issues. By contrast, Theriault noticed none of the ones he found in the original. Higham lauded the increased graphical and technical performance provided by the new platforms. Madnani felt the PC and PS5 versions were the best technically and graphically, while the Switch release had few performance differences from the original version. Higham also noted the improved performance on other consoles, citing them as the best way to play Vengeance. White specifically praised the more stable frame rate.

=== Sales ===
The game debuted as the highest selling physical video game of the week in Japan, selling over 143,000 copies and remaining in the top ten for another two weeks. According to the NPD Group, Shin Megami Tensei V reached sixteenth place in the combined game charts, the highest grossing debut in the main series, and was the sixth best-selling Switch release. In the UK, it debuted as the ninth highest selling game across platforms and outperformed other recent role-playing games in the region. By the end of 2022, the game had sold 1.1 million copies.

During its debut week in Japan, Vengeance sold over 56,800 copies, with the Switch and PS5 releases reaching first and second place respectively in Famitsu's sales charts. Within three days, Vengeance had sold 500,000 copies worldwide. Both versions of Shin Megami Tensei V have sold over two million copies as of March 2025.
