= Shin Megami Tensei: Strange Journey =

2009 role-playing game

- North American Nintendo DS box art
- Developers: Atlus; Lancarse
- Publishers: JP: Atlus; NA: Atlus USA; PAL: Deep Silver (Redux)
- Director: Eiji Ishida
- Producers: Kazuma Kaneko; Shinjiro Takata (Redux)
- Programmer: Atsushi Motouchi
- Artists: Kazuma Kaneko; Akira Odagaki (Redux); Masayuki Doi (Redux)
- Writers: Shogo Isogai; Kazuyuki Yamai; Tatsuya Watanabe
- Composers: Shoji Meguro; Toshiki Konishi (Redux)
- Series: Megami Tensei
- Platforms: Nintendo DS; Nintendo 3DS
- Release: Strange Journey: JP: October 8, 2009; NA: March 23, 2010; Strange Journey Redux: JP: October 26, 2017; NA: May 15, 2018; PAL: May 18, 2018
- Genre: Role-playing
- Mode: Single-player

Shin Megami Tensei: Strange Journey (Note: Shin Megami Tensei: Strange Journey (真・女神転生 STRANGE JOURNEY; lit. True Goddess Reincarnation: Strange Journey)) is a role-playing video game developed by Atlus and Lancarse for the Nintendo DS. The game is a spin-off in the Shin Megami Tensei series, which forms the core of the Megami Tensei franchise. It was released in Japan in 2009, and in North America in 2010. The story follows a special task force sent by the United Nations to investigate the Schwarzwelt, a spatial distortion that appears in Antarctica and threatens to engulf the world. Players take control of an unnamed protagonist, navigating the environments of the Schwarzwelt in first-person. Combat involves the player and recruited demons fighting against various enemies, with the protagonist having the option of talking with and recruiting enemies. Depending on choices taken in the story, multiple endings are unlocked.

The game originated from the team's wish to develop a large-scale role-playing game for the DS. Many of the main staff had worked on previous Megami Tensei titles in some capacity, including producer and designer Kazuma Kaneko, director Eiji Ishida, writer Shogo Isogai, and composer Shoji Meguro. The setting in Antarctica was chosen to appeal to an overseas audience. Alongside the new setting, the game featured multiple science fiction elements new to the series, taking inspiration from films such as Damnation Alley and The Thing. For the music, Meguro used grander musical styles than his previous works, incorporating choir music using a special synthesizer. Reception of the game was generally positive for its story and gameplay, but many disliked its first-person navigation.

A remake for the Nintendo 3DS, Shin Megami Tensei: Strange Journey Redux, (Note: Known in Japan as Shin Megami Tensei: Deep Strange Journey (真・女神転生 DEEP STRANGE JOURNEY; lit. True Goddess Reincarnation: Deep Strange Journey)) was released in Japan in 2017, and was released internationally in 2018 by Atlus in North America and Deep Silver in Europe. Strange Journey Redux adds an additional character and story route, and gameplay and graphical updates. Ishida and Meguro returned as director and co-composer, while new character art and music were provided respectively by Masayuki Doi and Toshiki Konishi.

== Gameplay ==
A battle: the top screen depicts the enemy sprites and party member displays, whereas the bottom screen displays information about the enemies

Shin Megami Tensei: Strange Journey is a role-playing game in which players control the player-named protagonist. The environments within the Schwarzwelt are seen and navigated from a first-person perspective: the 3D environment is displayed on the top screen of the Nintendo DS, while a 2D map is displayed on the bottom screen. Explored environments are automatically mapped out, with highlights being placed for unopened containers and doorways. These environments contain traps including pits, shifting floors, and floor tiles which damage the protagonist if stepped on. Alongside the main story quests, human non-playable characters and demons within the Schwarzwelt unlock side quests which yielded rewards upon completion. During the game, the protagonist's Demonica suit can be upgraded to open new pathways, enabling entry into new areas for story progression, as well as new parts of previously explored areas.

During exploration, the player enters battle through both story-based boss battles and random encounters with standard enemies. Combat is turn-based, with enemies facing against a four-member party made up of the protagonist and three chosen demons. Combat is governed by a derivative of the Press Turn system used in Shin Megami Tensei III: Nocturne: in Strange Journey, the relevant system is called the Demon Co-op System. If the player group strikes their opponent's weak point, any allied demon of the attacker's alignment will follow up with an unblockable attack which deals high damage.

As well as fighting demons, the protagonist can negotiate with them in a variety of ways: demons can be bribed, scared away, or recruited depending on responses given during conversation. After they are recruited, different demons can be fused together to create new demons. The new demon inherits skills from its parents, and some demons can only be obtained through fusion. The game includes 300 recruitable demons, all of which take inspiration from various world mythologies including Welsh, Egyptian, Norse, and Christian. Two main alignments govern the way demons must be approached: one that represents light, neutral and dark alignments; and one representing law, neutral and chaos alignments. The choices made in the story also affect how demons respond to player commands, and whether they will remain loyal. As with earlier titles, a Moon Phase divided into eight segments dictates how demons will behave. When the Moon is full, demons will refuse to talk. Fused demons can be shared between players using thirty-two character passwords generated when a new demon is fused. These passwords can be traded between different players.

== Synopsis ==
=== Setting and characters ===
The setting and events of Strange Journey are unrelated to any other entry in the Shin Megami Tensei series. The game is set in the early 21st century on the continent of Antarctica. During the game's opening, a massive atomic collapse occurs at the South Pole, causing the creation of the Schwarzwelt (シュバルツバース, Shubarutsubāsu; German for "Black World"), a black void which swallows anything it touches and threatens to engulf the Earth. The space within the Schwarzwelt is occupied by spaces representing the many vices of humanity, acting as a critique of them. The main bases are special amphibious vehicles: Red Sprite No. 1, the protagonist's vehicle, Blue Jet No. 2, Elve No. 3, and Gigantic No. 4.

The central cast are part of a special task force created by the United Nations to investigate and neutralize the Schwarzwelt. Players take control of a nameless member of the task force (Japanese in the original and American in the localization). Alongside the main protagonist, there are three main crew members on the Red Sprite: Commander Gore (ゴア隊長, Goa-taichō), the crew's leader; Jimenez (ヒメネス, Himenesu), an experienced American soldier who seeks rewards for his work; and Zelenin (ゼレーニン, Zerēnin), a knowledgeable Russian scientist. Other characters include Arthur (アーサー, Āsā), the Red Sprite's AI computer; the angel Mastema (マンセマット, Mansematto), who represents the forces of God; Mem Aleph (メムアレフ, Memu Arefu), a primordial mother goddess who controls the demons of the Schwarzwelt; and Louisa Ferre (ルイ・サイファー, Rui Saifā), an avatar of Lucifer who watches the protagonist's actions.

=== Plot ===
Strange Journey is set in a world threatened by the expansion of a phenomenon called the Schwarzwelt, which threatens to envelop the Earth. The United Nations send in multiple teams, led by a man named Gore, to investigate and eradicate the phenomenon. During their attempt to enter the Schwarzwelt, all ships but the Red Sprite are destroyed. During their missions, the crew is helped by Arthur, who gradually accumulates knowledge of the Schwarzwelt and develops a personality. During an early mission within the Schwarzwelt, Gore is killed, leaving Arthur in charge. As the protagonist and members of the Red Sprite's crew explore the regions of the Schwarzwelt, they slowly uncover the truth behind its existence. In ancient times, humans were controlled by the forces of God. His rule over them was broken when the Mother Goddess Mem Aleph destroyed him, breaking his hold on Earth. Residing within the Schwarzwelt, Mem Aleph saw humans abusing Earth's environment and consequently corrupting her dimension. Determined to remove those humans responsible for the corruption and return the world to its ancient state, Mem Aleph unleashed the Schwarzwelt. The remaining forces of God, mainly represented by Mastema, intend to use the Schwarzwelt to spread their influence across the world, removing free will to create a united utopia. Key items are the Cosmic Eggs, objects created by Mem Aleph that can reshape the world when combined with the core of the Schwarzwelt.

Zelenin and Jimenez respectively side with Law and Chaos, while a resurrected Gore is neutral to both. Depending on the choices made during the game, the protagonist has the choice of allying with either Mastema and Zelenin, Mem Aleph and Jimenez, or continuing with the original mission. If he sides with Law, the protagonist and Zelenin defeat both Jimenez and Mem Aleph before using the Eggs to create a World of Law, with Zelenin worshiped as a channel to God for humanity. In the process, humanity is forced to abandon their free will. If he sides with Chaos, he and Jimenez help Mem Aleph defeat Zelenin and Mastema, using the Eggs to fulfill the Schwarzwelt's original purpose and create a world where humans and demons live together in a primal world where only the strong survive. In both the Law and Chaos routes, Arthur chooses to destroy his new personality to save the protagonist after the Red Sprite is damaged by Gore. If the protagonist rejects Law and Chaos, Gore transmits the necessary information for the destruction of the Schwarzwelt to him before truly passing on. After defeating Zelenin, Jimenez, and Mem Aleph, the protagonist and surviving crew escape in the Red Sprite while Arthur sacrifices himself to ensure the destruction of the Schwarzwelt, although there is a chance of it reappearing if humanity continues its abuse of the Earth.

In the Redux version, the protagonist is attacked and nearly killed by a woman called Alex, but saved by the demon Demeter who tasks him with traversing a location called the Womb of Grief to collect objects called Fruit. As the protagonist explores the Womb of Grief, it is revealed that Alex has traveled back in time to assassinate him, Jimenez, and Zelenin in order to prevent an apocalyptic future from coming to pass triggered by their actions in the Schwarzwelt and leave her as the last living human. After the protagonist chooses their alignment, Alex confronts him a final time, begging for his and his companion's help averting her future. If the protagonist refuses to aid Alex, he defeats her and the game ends as normal. If he chooses to help her, she fades from existence with the timeline changed. Demeter reveals that the Fruit are pieces of a fifth Cosmic Egg, and that she is a servant of the Three Wise Men before stealing the Fruit. Louisa Ferre transports the protagonist to the Empyrean Ascent, where the protagonist defeats the Three Wise Men, who fight in their true form Shekhinah. In the extended Law ending, Zelenin uses her song to remove humanity's desire for conflict, leading to an age of peace and harmony. In the extended Chaos ending, Jimenez uses the Cosmic Eggs to create a world where all humans and demons have infinite possibilities and true freedom. In the extended Neutral ending, the protagonist and Arthur remain in the Schwarzwelt's realm to repeatedly destroy it when humanity causes its appearance.

== Development ==
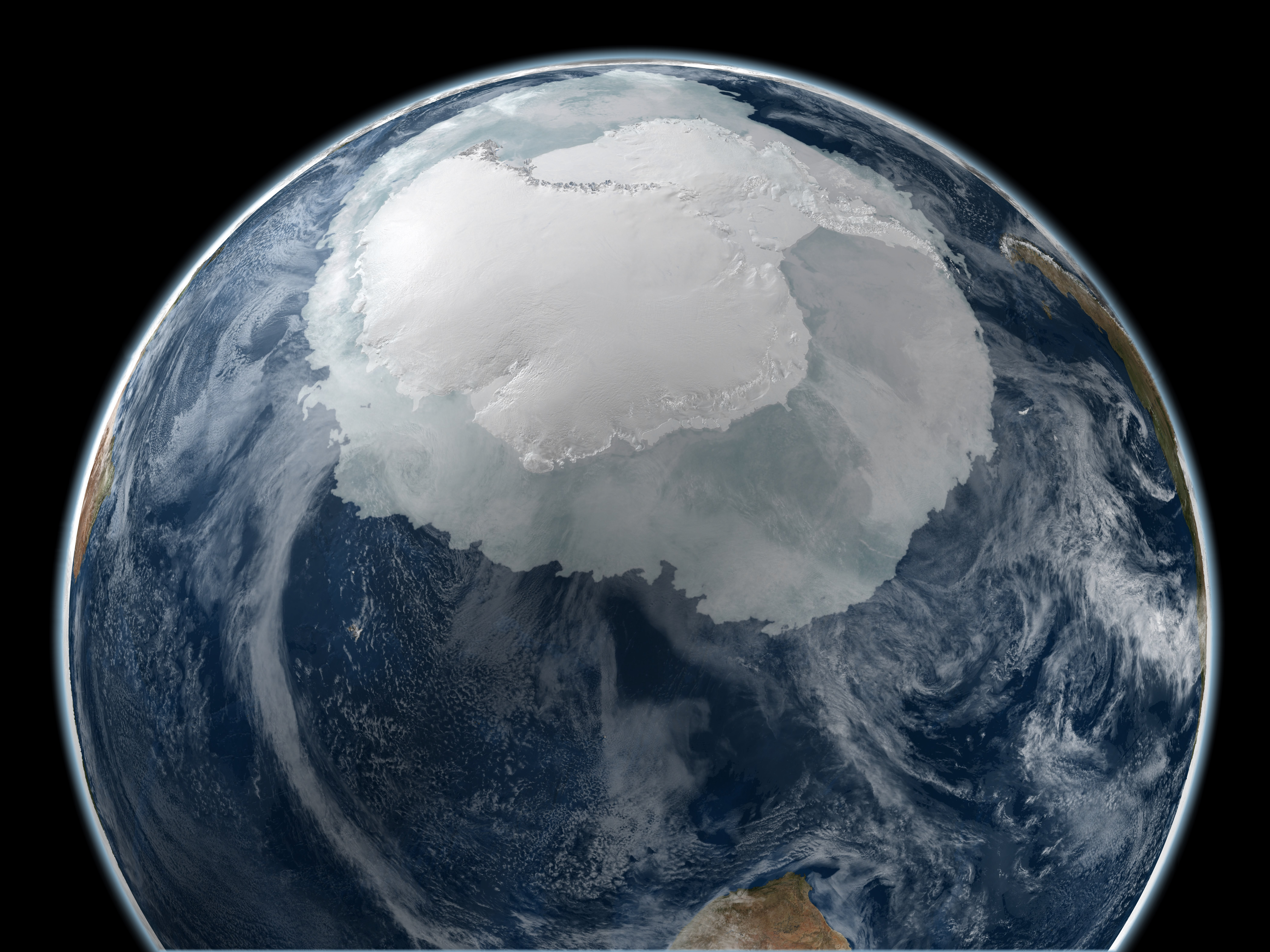
The game's setting in Antarctica was chosen with an international audience in mind. The setting and subsequent character interactions were inspired by John Carpenter's 1982 film The Thing.

Strange Journey was co-developed by Atlus and Lancarse, the developers of the Etrian Odyssey series. Strange Journey ran on a modified version of the engine used in the original Etrian Odyssey. The Atlus staff were made up of many veterans of the Megami Tensei series: Kazuma Kaneko was producer, and character and demon designer; Eiji Ishida made his debut as a director after being chief designer for Shin Megami Tensei: Nocturne; and the scenario's main writer was Shogo Isogai, who had worked on Shin Megami Tensei II, Shin Megami Tensei If..., and Nocturne. Strange Journey originated during talks among Atlus staff about creating a large-scale role-playing game using a small development team. Kaneko suggested a Shin Megami Tensei game for the Nintendo DS. While originally planned as a small casual-focused project with a short development time, it grew in scale and shifted towards more challenging gameplay design.

There were two main reasons for developing the game for this platform: Kaneko felt that the portable design fit in well with Shin Megami Tensei gameplay philosophies, fellow role-playing game Etrian Odyssey had been a commercial success, it had the biggest install base among their target audience, and its nature as a portable game meant people could concentrate more on the game when knowing that they could end their play session with ease. The inspiration behind the game's subtitle was the event horizon as associated with black holes. An early subtitle was "Strange Horizon", but this had been used in a previous unspecified video game setting. After Kaneko watched Amazing Journey: The Story of The Who, he and Eishida agreed on the title Strange Journey. Speaking in 2008 Kaneko described the decision not to brand the game as "Shin Megami Tensei IV" due to its different design goals, with Ishida clarifying in 2018 that the game was developed as a spin-off from the outset and gave them a lot of freedom with its setting and themes.

When designing the game, the team aimed to appeal to hardcore gamers, with their main focus being on balancing gameplay and maintaining a challenging difficulty level. The gameplay was kept firmly within the traditions of the Megami Tensei series, while evolving and sometimes changing them. For example, the fusion system was re-designed to keep the game fast-paced, and former restrictions on skill inheritance were loosened to encourage experimentation. In contrast, the ability to fine-tune the main character's stats was removed. The battle system design and programming were both handled by Lancarse. The battle system was designed to provide ease of play, while aspects of demon alignment directly tied to the game's moral alignment system. The Demonica suit, which was tied into many of the game's systems, was designed around the concept of a spacesuit that included crucial software with which new demons could become visible and new areas could be explored. The multiplayer feature was originally conceived as players having contests between their demons, but this was decided against as it did not fit the game's atmosphere. Instead, the concept of demon exchanges was designed. Passwords were chosen over Wi-fi functions as it would make password exchanges through internet forums easier.

From the outset, the game was designed with an overseas release in mind. Among the early ideas created for the title was for it to be set in New York City, inspired by John Carpenter's 1981 film Escape from New York. This was vetoed as it would not offer much variety in its cast. To enable an international cast, it was decided to set the game in Antarctica. This choice of setting was also made to depict the danger posed by the Schwarzwelt on a worldwide scale. This setting differed greatly from previous Shin Megami Tensei games, which had taken place in Tokyo. It was also chosen as the North Pole had no widespread landmass, making it an impractical setting. When developing the character drama, the team took inspiration from another film by Carpenter, 1982's The Thing. The moral alignment system, a staple in earlier Shin Megami Tensei entries, was reintroduced for Strange Journey to help players experience the game's themes.

The central cast acted as both a microcosm of humanity and representation of the game's alignments. Due to the setting, the characters had to be members of a Special Forces group, as opposed to previous protagonists who had been average people. The game includes a larger presence of science fiction elements than in previous Shin Megami Tensei games. Various elements within the game were inspired by science fiction movies: the Red Sprite was inspired by the main vehicle from the 1977 film Damnation Alley, and some equipment was inspired by James Cameron's 1986 film Aliens. The characters' firearms were all modeled after real-life guns. When creating the Demonica suits, Kaneko decided against creating a pleasing design, instead focusing on a utilitarian appearance. Elaborating on how the science fiction elements complemented rather than clashed with the mystical elements of Shin Megami Tensei, Kaneko stated that he felt that the series had always had elements of those two genres merging, commenting that some people saw a web URL as something like a magical incantation and referencing a quote from Arthur C. Clark about technology becoming so advanced that it looked like magic.

=== Music ===
The music was composed and arranged by Shoji Meguro, whose previous work for the series included Revelations: Persona and Nocturne. In contrast to his previous work on the Persona series, Meguro did not use contemporary musical elements. Instead, he created a more mature experience to reflect the game's story and setting. Ishida did not request a specific musical style, but instead asked Meguro to create the game score as if the game were a motion picture. The game's atmosphere led Meguro's decision to create a "sci-fi horror" tone in the score.

To achieve the desired effect, he used militaristic orchestration, Gregorian choir, and minimalistic ambiance. The choir sounds were created using Eastwest Quantum Leap Symphonic Choirs, a synthesizer which could realistically simulate a choir. An exception was the "Sorrow" theme, for which he primarily used a piano melody. For the game's "chaos" theme, he used musical elements similar to those in Nocturne. So as to get as much music as possible on the game cartridge, Meguro used CRI Middleware's Kyuseishu Sound Streamer compression algorithm.

Shin Megami Tensei: Strange Journey Original Soundtrack released on November 18, 2009, as a single CD release under the catalog number COCX-35945. It was published by Nippon Columbia. A bonus soundtrack containing music from the game was included with launch copies of the game in North America. After the game's release, it was discovered that the bonus disc had a manufacturing defect that made it unplayable. Once the issue was raised, Atlus and its manufacturing partner moved to enable players to receive free replacements. Reviews of the original soundtrack release have been positive, with reviewers noting its change in style compared to previous Megami Tensei games.

== Release ==
Strange Journey released on October 8, 2009, in Japan, and March 23, 2010, in North America. The first information on a new title in the series appeared in the form of a teaser site created on July 16, 2009, for the Japanese Atlus website, depicting Earth with a large hole in the bottom. Using the page's source code and locating an unused graphic, it was deciphered the game's title was Strange Journey and confirmed it to be a Megami Tensei title. A week later, Atlus officially announced the game for the DS, clearing up a rumor among fans that the title was an entry in the Persona series.

The game's North American release, along with a release window, was announced in November 2009. For its release, the ESRB rated the game "M for Mature". This made the game the tenth Nintendo DS game to earn the rating. Alongside the bonus CD, Atlus revealed a mini-poster exclusive to GameStop customers who purchased the game through street stores and online. After release, Atlus gave away exclusive demon passwords to fans to unlock otherwise inaccessible demons during gameplay.

The English localization was handled by Atlus USA, led by Nich Maragos and Yu Namba. During translation, the team had a mixed experience translating the katakana names. While names such as "Williams" were easy, names such as "Skogsra", a demon based on a Scandinavian forest spirit, proved a challenge and required specific research on the name's origins. Some of the localization choices were made due to the team's knowledge of Ishida's enthusiasm for western culture. They also needed to create varied speaking styles for the various demons, from middle English to a more modern vernacular, which proved a time-consuming process.

=== Strange Journey Redux ===
A remake for the Nintendo 3DS, titled Shin Megami Tensei: Strange Journey Redux, was announced in March 2017; the remake included gameplay additions, redrawn art, new story content, the new character Alex, and voice acting. Several staff returned for Redux, including Ishida returned as director. Ishida also wrote the new scenario alongside Yoh Haduki and Hironori Akutsu. New character Alex and new demons were designed by Masayuki Doi. Additional character redesigns were done by Akira Odagaki. The opening animation was created by Studio Naz. Redux was released in Japan on October 26, 2017. In the West the game released in 2018; it was published by Atlus in North America on May 15, and by Deep Silver in Europe on May 18.

Ishida wanted to remake Strange Journey to bring it to a wider audience, with the remake's performance being used to judge a potential sequel Ishida had plans for. Doi designed Alex based on her role opposing the main protagonists, with contrasting equipment that would set her apart from the Red Sprite crew. Additional character art was added for all characters to increase player immersion. Meguro returned to compose new music with Toshiki Konishi, who had previously worked on Shin Megami Tensei IV. Meguro created the new opening theme and Alex's theme, while Konishi handled the rest of the new score. The two had been working on the score of Persona 5 (2017), and Konishi had difficulty early on matching the orchestral style of the original score. An early track was dismissed due to it being too similar to the original score, and after that Konishi was able to find a balance between the orchestral original and his own musical style.

== Reception ==
Reception

Aggregate scores
Aggregator	Score
Metacritic	80/100 (26 reviews)
OpenCritic	78% recommend(Remake)

Review scores
Publication	Score
1Up.com	A−
Eurogamer	8/10
Famitsu	36/40
Game Informer	8.75/10
GamePro	3.5/5
GameSpot	6/10
IGN	8.5/10

Strange Journey sold 97,000 units in its first week in Japan, coming in third on the Japanese sales charts behind Pokémon HeartGold and SoulSilver and Wii Fit Plus. Ultimately, the game sold lower than expected: Atlus expected the game to sell 170,000 copies, but actual sales by November had only reached 152,000 copies. The game has had a positive reception, earning scores of 80/100 from the review aggregator Metacritic. Famitsu gave the game a score of 36 points out of 40, noted by IGN as being the highest score given by the magazine to a Shin Megami Tensei game up to that time.

Charles Onyett of IGN described the plot as "interesting", noting the amount of personality within the game. Phil Kollar of Game Informer highlighted the story's themes of tension between technology and nature, while Heidi Kemps of GamePro called the story "a refreshingly thoughtful experience compared to most Japanese RPG plots" despite controversial content. Eurogamer's Matt Edwards felt the story was absorbing but lacked originality. Andrew Fitch, in his review on 1UP.com, felt the story was a standard type from within the Megami Tensei series, and Lark Anderson of GameSpot found the plot "excessively preachy".

Famitsu described the world design as "unique", and Anderson praised the soundtrack as fitting with the new setting and noted the detailed environmental design and sprite animations. Kollar praised the demon designs and described the soundtrack as "excellent" while faulting the dungeon visual designs. Onyett praised the demon designs while faulting the environments, and felt that the soundtrack while good was overused to compsensate for other presentational shortcomings. Anderson also praised the soundtrack as fitting with the new setting and praised the detailed environmental design and sprite animations. Edwards noted a lack of distinct environmental design, and felt its production values fell behind the recently released Infinite Space when comparing its 3D dungeons to the 2D sprite art.

Speaking of the gameplay, Famitsu praised it as well balanced, positively noting the tutorials and fusion mechanics. Fitch called it a combination of "classically engrossing MegaTen and Etrian Odyssey", praising the exploration and dungeon design. Kemps called the dungeon exploration exciting, but found the lack of help with demon fusion detracted from the experience. Edwards was also generally positive about the battle system, highlighting its ease of understanding for players. Onyett called the combat "standard", but praised the demon fusion and negotiation mechanics. Kollar said that the Demon Co-op attack system made the game more approachable than previous Shin Megami Tensei series, but found that exploration could become tedious. Anderson found the gameplay dated, particularly citing the dungeon design and negotiation system, citing the former as being too repetitive to be interesting.
