= Amat-Mamu (daughter of Sin-ilum) =

Babylonian priestess

Amat-Mamu (fl. c. 1736 BC) was a Babylonian nadītu priestess in Sippar from the 18th century BC who was the subject of legal proceedings involving her inheritance. Amat-Mamu was chosen as the heir of fellow nadītu Belessunu, who bequeathed Amat-Mamu her land and slaves. In exchange, Amat-Mamu was to provide for Belessunu until her death. The estate was claimed by two of Belessunu's cousins, but the mayor ruled in favor of Belessunu and Amat-Mamu. Amat-Mamu then lost the deeds when they were kept in her uncle's home, requiring her to have them reconstituted in a new tablet. This tablet was preserved, and its description of Amat-Mamu's inheritance provides insight into Babylonian inheritance practices.

== Family and inheritance ==
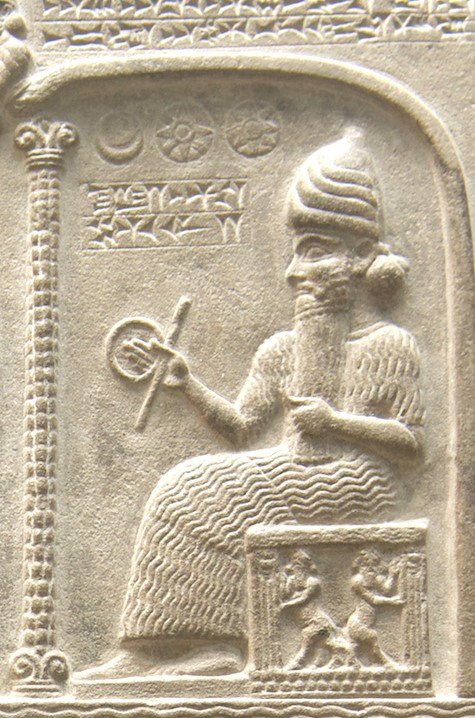
A depiction of Shamash

Amat-Mamu was a nadītu, a priestess to the god Shamash. She was the daughter of Sin-ilum (also transcribed as Sîn-ilum or Sin-ili). Sin-ilum was the son of Sin-tajjār, who in turn was the son of Akšāja. Amat-Mamu had a cousin, an aunt, and a great aunt who were all nadītus as well. Nadītus were sometimes allowed to choose their own heirs, including potential heirs outside of their own families. Such an option was allowed to the nadītu Belessunu, daughter of Mannium, as part of the terms of her own adoption as the heir of her aunt Naramtum, and Belessunu adopted Amat-Mamu as her heir.

Amat-Mamu inherited four fields totaling 46 acres: a five-acre field and a 20 acre field in the Pzur-Ilaba district, a nine-acre field in the Akbarum district, and a 12 acre field in the Pahuşu district. She also inherited two plots of land: one and one-third sar of partially developed land in the cloister and six sar of undeveloped land of Sippar-rabum. Amat-Mamu inherited three slaves from Belessunu: Ana-pani-Šamaš-nadi, Sin-mašmaš, and Sin-mašmaš's brother. Also inherited were a house, two copper pots, and two axes. Amat-Mamu was given the deeds, or "mother tablets", entitling her to Belessunu's property.

Per the terms of the agreement, Amat-Mamu was required to pay Belessunu's debts and provide for her while she lived. The debt totaled two-thirds mina, six shekels of silver. To provide for Belessunu, Amat-Mamu was required to provide Belessunu with six gurs of grain, 12 minas of wool, 24 liters of oil, six feasts, 20 liters of flour, and two pieces of meat each year. The agreement specified that this agreement was only with Amat-Mamu, and no other person could lay claim to Belessunu's estate by providing for her.

Two years after the agreement was made, two of Belessunu's cousins and fellow nadītus—Amat-Šamaš and Nīši-īnīšu—laid claim to the fields. The mayor of Sippar, Zimri-Erah, ruled that the inheritance was rightfully Belessunu's. The cousins were penalized for making a false claim over property, and they were forced to give Amat-Mamu a tablet that relinquished their claims. Professor Rivkah Harris speculated that Belessunu passed over her cousins in favor of Amat-Mamu because Amat-Mamu was a member of a wealthy family and therefore better able to support Belessunu during her life.

== Reconstitution of the tablets ==
The cuneiform tablets confirming Amat-Mamu's inheritance were stored in the home of her uncle, Ikun-pī-Sîn. They were kept separate from the family archive so as not to suggest that the inheritance was part of the family estate. It is unknown why they were kept in her uncle's house, though such storage arrangements with family members were not uncommon.

When they were lost, her father Sîn-ilî had a deposition taken from the uncle admitting to their loss. Amat-Mamu was forced to go to the court so the judges could authorize the creation of new tablets. The tablets that Belessunu received as a girl during her own adoption were not reconstituted, for her and her witnesses to that contract had already died. The court also ruled that should the previous tablets be found, they were still the sole property of Amat-Mamu.

The sequence of events describing both the legal dispute and the tablets' loss was documented on the reconstituted tablet. The reconstitution meant that some details were lost and inconsistencies were introduced, primarily in the description of the fields. The tablet is dated to the 14th year of Samsu-iluna's rule, placing its creation around 1736 BC. It has been preserved and is designated by archeologists as CT 47.63. Amat-Mamu's story is listed on the tablet alongside that of Belessunu, including Belessunu's dedication as a nadītu and her adoption by her aunt. The tablet is used in the modern era as a reference to understand Babylonian property and inheritance law.
