= Symphonic Choirs =

Singing vocal synthesizer and library software

- Symphonic Choirs WordBuilder interface
- Developers: East West, Quantum Leap
- Release: 2005; 21 years ago
- Stable release: 2.1.1 / 2010; 16 years ago
- Operating system: Windows 7 or later, OS X 10.7 or later
- Available in: English
- Type: Voice synthesizer

Symphonic Choirs is a vocal synthesizer and vocal library software created by EastWest, designed to imitate an entire vocal choir. The content was created by producers Doug Rogers and Nick Phoenix with recording engineer Keith O. Johnson for EastWest. Recorded in a real concert hall, the software initially had two styles of producing a result, the first being the "PLAY" engine version and the second being the "WordBuilder". The WordBuilder works by the user typing in what they want the software to recreate and it playing back the words.

It has vocal samples for male, female and young boys' choirs. It covers the ranges Soprano, Alto, Tenor and Bass and has audio engine effects and outputs. The SATB sections offer Normal, Legato, Staccato, and Slurred articulations, while the young boys choir offers Normal and Legato articulations. It was recorded with 3 microphones, giving the impression of the choir being in different positions. The software only contains choir-themed samples, so it is not designed to sing any other genre of music. Other samples include solo sounds in tones such as whispers covering Soprano, Alto and choir boy, though these samples do not use WordBuilder. The software also works with Kompakt, allowing for use of sound layers for user creation of choirs to suit the means; although the software can be used without Kompakt, the user will not be able to access the full capabilities of the sample library.

In the PLAY version 2.1.1 update released in 2010, WordBuilder and PLAY were integrated into a single interface. The "Choirs (VOTA) Expansion" expansion pack was also later created using samples from Quantum Leap sound libraries. The samples contain heavy vibrato vowels that allow the loudest Symphonic Choirs to crossfade with the FFF Mark Wherry's "Voices of the Apocalypse". They were also built with the WordBuilder in mind. It also includes sample patches, "Angels" and "Demons" from "Voices of the Apocalypse". Unlike the original software, the expansion is recorded with a single microphone.

== Reception ==
When reviewing the original version of the software, Sound on Sound reviewer John Walden called the quality "magnificent" and believed it was suitable for hobbyist, educational and professional markets.

Audio Pro Central felt that the software was expensive, but still cheaper than hiring an entire choir for the same session and state its results were "breathtaking". However, it noted the software's limitations beyond choir synthesis.

TechRadar noted the amount of samples crammed into the software at 38GB spread across 9 DVDs and it was part of a growing trend at time of release of amassing large amounts of sampled sounds into a product. The result is that a computer running 64-bit OS was needed and simple Windows XP and 2GBs of data may not cut it. Other criticisms include the note of the wobbliness of some of the solo samples and while the Bass were "gutsy" and the sopranos "ethereal" it was difficult to make samples switch roles. Focusing on the high price, the product was given an overall mixed review and it was noted due to the high price some seeking such a product may be better off if the software offered a quarter of the content at a lower price.

Electronic Musician reviewer David M. Rubin felt the software was "high-end", noting its flexibility. He admitted that you have to learn how to work with the phonetic system quite a bit and the results may not be as good as an experienced choir director can deliver, but noted how it worked to give a great virtual choir. He noted at the time of his review there were no solo, tenor, or bass samples and the WordBuilder did not work with the solo samples, but gave an overall good review. The high demand of the processor was also noted by him as a downfall of the software.
