= Megami Tensei =

Japanese video game franchise

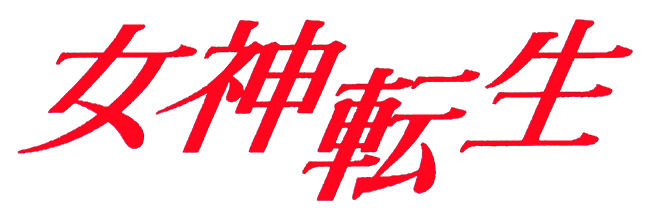
- Genres: Role-playing, monster-taming
- Developer: Atlus: Arc System Works, Cave, Career Soft, Lancarse, Multimedia Intelligence Transfer, Nex Entertainment, Omega Force, Sega
- Publishers: Atlus: JP: Atlus, Namco, Sega; NA: Atlus USA, Aeria Games, Sega; EU: Atlus, Deep Silver, Koei, Ghostlight, Nintendo, NIS America, Sega, Square Enix, Zen United
- Creators: Aya Nishitani (Original Novels); Kouji Okada; Gin'ichiro Suzuki; Kazunari Suzuki
- Platform: Various: Android, FM-7, Game Boy, Game Boy Color, Game Boy Advance, Game Gear, iOS, Microsoft Windows, MSX, NES, Nintendo DS, Nintendo 3DS, Nintendo Switch, Nintendo Switch 2, PC-8801, PC-9801, PC Engine, PlayStation, PlayStation 2, PlayStation 3, PlayStation 4, PlayStation 5, PlayStation Portable, PlayStation Vita, Sega CD, Sega Saturn, Sharp X1, SNES, Virtual Boy, Wii, Wii U, Xbox, Xbox 360, Xbox One, Xbox Series X/S
- First release: Digital Devil Story: Megami Tensei; September 11, 1987
- Latest release: Raidou Remastered: The Mystery of the Soulless Army; June 19, 2025
- Parent series: Digital Devil Story
- Spin-offs: Megami Tensei Gaiden; Majin Tensei; Jack Bros.; Devil Summoner; Persona; Digital Devil Saga; Devil Children; Devil Survivor; Shin Megami Tensei: Liberation Dx2

Megami Tensei, (Note: Megami Tensei (Japanese: 女神転生) is often translated as "Reincarnation of the Goddess", and commonly abbreviated as MegaTen (メガテン).) marketed internationally as Shin Megami Tensei (formerly Revelations), is a Japanese multi-medium franchise created by Aya Nishitani, Kouji "Cozy" Okada, Ginichiro Suzuki, and Kazunari Suzuki. Primarily developed and published by Atlus, the franchise consists of multiple subseries and covers multiple role-playing video game genres including tactical role-playing, action role-playing, and massively multiplayer online role-playing. The first two titles in the series were published by Namco (now Bandai Namco Entertainment), but starting with Shin Megami Tensei, subsequent episodes have been almost always published by Atlus in Japan and North America. For Europe, Atlus publishes the games through third-party companies.

The series was originally based on Digital Devil Story, a science fiction novel series by Aya Nishitani. The series takes its name from the first book's subtitle. Most Megami Tensei titles are stand-alone entries with their own stories and characters. Recurring elements include plot themes, a story shaped by the player's choices, and the ability to fight using and often recruit creatures to aid the player in battle. Elements of philosophy, religion, occultism and science fiction have all been incorporated into the series at different times.

While not maintaining as high a profile as series such as Final Fantasy and Dragon Quest, it is highly popular in Japan and maintains a strong cult following in the West, finding critical and commercial success. The series has become well known for its artistic direction, challenging gameplay, and music, but raised controversy over its mature content, dark themes, and use of Christian religious imagery. Additional media include manga adaptations, animated films, and television series.

In Japan, some games in the series do not use the "Megami Tensei" title, such as the Persona sub-series. Many of the early games in the series were not localized due to potentially controversial content including religious references, and later due to their age. English localizations have used the "Shin Megami Tensei" moniker since the release of Shin Megami Tensei: Nocturne in 2004.

== Titles ==
=== Games ===
The first installment in the franchise, Digital Devil Story: Megami Tensei, was released on September 11, 1987. The following entries have nearly always been unrelated to each other except in carrying over thematic and gameplay elements. The Megami Tensei games, and the later Shin Megami Tensei titles form the core of the series, while other subseries such as Persona, Devil Children, and Devil Summoner are spin-offs marketed as part of the franchise. There are also stand-alone spin-off titles.

==== Main series ====
Release timeline
1987	Digital Devil Story: Megami Tensei
1988–1989
1990	Digital Devil Story: Megami Tensei II
1991
1992	Shin Megami Tensei
1993
1994	Shin Megami Tensei II
1994	Shin Megami Tensei If...
1995	Kyuuyaku Megami Tensei
1996–2001
2002	Shin Megami Tensei: Nine
2003	Shin Megami Tensei III: Nocturne
2004–2006
2007	Shin Megami Tensei: Imagine
2008
2009	Shin Megami Tensei: Strange Journey
2010–2012
2013	Shin Megami Tensei IV
2014–2015
2016	Shin Megami Tensei IV: Apocalypse
2017	Shin Megami Tensei: Strange Journey Redux
2018	Shin Megami Tensei: Liberation Dx2
2019
2020	Shin Megami Tensei III Nocturne HD Remaster
2021	Shin Megami Tensei V
2022–2023
2024	Shin Megami Tensei V: Vengeance

Two entries were released for the Famicom: Digital Devil Story: Megami Tensei in 1987, and Digital Devil Story: Megami Tensei II in 1990. The two titles are unrelated to each other in terms of story, and each introduced the basic gameplay and story mechanics that would come to define the series. Three entries were released for the Super Famicom: Shin Megami Tensei in 1992, followed by Shin Megami Tensei II in 1994, and Shin Megami Tensei If..., released later in the same year.

Shin Megami Tensei III: Nocturne was released in 2003 for the PlayStation 2. Its Maniax Edition director's cut was released in Japan and North America in 2004, and in Europe in 2005. The numeral was dropped for its North American release, and its title changed to Shin Megami Tensei: Lucifer's Call in Europe. Shin Megami Tensei IV for the Nintendo 3DS was released in 2013 in Japan and North America, and a year later in Europe as a digital-only release. Another game set in the same universe, Shin Megami Tensei IV: Apocalypse, was released for the 3DS in February 2016 in Japan. Shin Megami Tensei V was released on the Nintendo Switch in 2021. An enhanced version of the game titled Shin Megami Tensei V: Vengeance was released in June 2024 for Microsoft Windows, Nintendo Switch, PlayStation 4, PlayStation 5, Xbox One and Xbox Series X/S.

In addition to the main series, there are also numerous spin-offs. Shin Megami Tensei: Nine, was released for the Xbox in 2002. Originally designed as a massively multiplayer online role-playing game (MMORPG), it was later split into a dual single-player and multiplayer package, and the single-player version released first. The online version was delayed and eventually cancelled as the developers could not manage the required online capacities using Xbox Live. Shin Megami Tensei: Imagine, a true MMORPG released for Microsoft Windows, was released in 2007 in Japan, 2008 in North America, and 2009 in Europe. Western service was terminated in 2014 when Marvelous USA, the game's then-handlers, shut down their PC Online game department. Its Japanese service ended in May 2016. Shin Megami Tensei: Strange Journey was released for the Nintendo DS in 2009 in Japan and 2010 in North America. A smartphone game, Shin Megami Tensei: Liberation Dx2, was released in 2018.

==== Persona ====
The Persona series is the largest and most popular spin-off from the Megami Tensei series. The first entry in the series, Megami Ibunroku Persona (originally released overseas as Revelations: Persona), was released in 1996 in Japan and North America. The first Persona 2 title, Innocent Sin, was released in 1999 in Japan. The second game, Eternal Punishment, was released in 2000 in Japan and North America. Persona 3 was released in 2006 in Japan, 2007 in North America, and 2008 in Europe. Its sequel, Persona 4, was released in 2008 in Japan and North America, and in 2009 in Europe. A sixth entry in the series, Persona 5, was released in Japan on September 15, 2016, and was released in North America and Europe on April 4, 2017, to critical acclaim. The series also features spin-offs, including Persona Q: Shadow of the Labyrinth and Persona Q2: New Cinema Labyrinth, two fighting games Persona 4 Arena and its sequel Arena Ultimax as well as the crossover fighting game BlazBlue: Cross Tag Battle, tactical role-playing game Persona 5 Tactica, action role-playing game Persona 5 Strikers and rhythm games Persona 4: Dancing All Night, Persona 3: Dancing in Moonlight, and Persona 5: Dancing in Starlight. While Persona 3 and 4 used the Shin Megami Tensei moniker in the West, it was dropped for the Persona 4 Arena duology and Persona 4 Golden as it would have made the titles too long to be practical.

==== Devil Summoner ====
The Devil Summoner subseries began in 1995 with the release of Shin Megami Tensei: Devil Summoner. It was followed by Devil Summoner: Soul Hackers in 1997, then followed by Soul Hackers 2, released in 2022. Two action role-playing prequels set in 1920s Tokyo were also developed, which revolve around demon summoner Raidou Kuzunoha: Raidou Kuzunoha vs. the Soulless Army was released in 2006, and Raidou Kuzunoha vs. King Abaddon was released in 2008.

==== Other spin-offs ====
Aside from Persona and Devil Summoner, there are other spin-off series covering multiple genres. After the release of Shin Megami Tensei II, Atlus began focusing work on building spin-offs and subseries that would form part of the Megami Tensei franchise. Shortly after Nocturne's release, a duology titled Digital Devil Saga (Digital Devil Saga: Avatar Tuner in Japan) was created based around similar systems to Nocturne, and was also intended as a more accessible gaming experience. Two tactical role-playing games have been developed by Atlus for the DS under the Devil Survivor moniker: the original Devil Survivor and Devil Survivor 2. Both have received expanded ports for the 3DS. Other subseries include Last Bible, a series aimed at a younger audience and using a pure fantasy setting; Devil Children, which was inspired by the popular Pokémon series; and Majin Tensei, a series of strategy games. Two notable stand-alone spin-offs are action spin-off Jack Bros. and Tokyo Mirage Sessions ♯FE, a crossover with Intelligent Systems' Fire Emblem series.

=== Related media ===
Several titles in the franchise have received anime and manga adaptations. Persona 3 received both a four-part theatrical adaptation (#1 Spring of Birth, #2 Midsummer Knight's Dream, #3 Falling Down, #4 Winter of Rebirth), and a spin-off series titled Persona: Trinity Soul. Persona 4 received two adaptations: Persona 4: The Animation, based on the original game, and Persona 4: The Golden Animation, based on its expanded PlayStation Vita port. A live-action television series based on the original Devil Summoner was broadcast between 1997 and 1998. Devil Survivor 2 also received an anime adaptation of the same name, and the Devil Children series received two anime adaptations. Multiple Shin Megami Tensei and Persona titles have received manga and CD drama adaptations. Action figures and merchandise related to Persona have also been produced.

== Common elements ==
Despite most games in the series taking place in different continuities, they do share certain elements. One of its defining traits is it being set in the contemporary urban environment of modern-day Tokyo. Post-apocalyptic elements are a recurring feature in settings and narratives. This choice was originally made to set the game apart from other fantasy-based gaming franchises of the time, as modern-day Tokyo was rarely seen in games as opposed to versions of it from the past. The Persona series takes place exclusively within this setting, spanning a single continuity and mostly focusing on the exploits of a group of young people.

Shin Megami Tensei II is one of the notable early exceptions to the series' common setting, as it is set in a science fiction-styled future despite still including fantasy elements. The Last Bible series also shifted to a full fantasy setting. Two more recent notable departures were Strange Journey, which shifted the focus to Antarctica to portray the threat on a global scale, and Shin Megami Tensei IV, which included a medieval-stage society existing separately from a modern-day Tokyo. The Devil Summoner games take the form of modern-day detective stories as opposed to post-apocalyptic settings.

The series title translates as "Reincarnation of the Goddess": this has carried over into the current Shin Megami Tensei series, which has been officially translated as "True Goddess Metempsychosis". The word "Metempsychosis" refers to the cycle of reincarnation that ties into many Megami Tensei stories. The reborn goddess of the title has multiple meanings: it refers to a female character in each game that could be interpreted as the goddess, and is also representative of the drastic changes a location undergoes during a game. The concept of reincarnation was also included in narratives and gameplay mechanics to tie in with these themes. The series' overarching title has been truncated to "MegaTen" by series fans. Originating in Japan, the abbreviation has become a common term for the series among its fans. Its subseries Persona is named as "Nǚshén Yìwénlù" (simplified Chinese: 女神异闻录; traditional Chinese: 女神異聞錄; lit. 'Alternate Tale of the Goddess') in Chinese, originating from the Japan version of Megami Tensei series used this term as subtitles in early spin-offs.

=== Gameplay ===
Screenshot of the Press Turn system as it appears in Shin Megami Tensei IV. Allied demons include designs by Kazuma Kaneko.

The gameplay in the series has become notable for its high difficulty, along with several mechanics that have endured between games. A key element present since the first Megami Tensei is the ability to recruit demons to fight alongside the player in battle, alongside the ability to fuse two different demons together to create a more powerful demon. Equivalents to these systems appear in the later Persona titles. The franchise's most recognizable battle system is the Press Turn system, first introduced in Nocturne. The Press Turn System is a turn-based battle mechanic governing both the player party and enemies, where either party are rewarded an extra turn for striking an enemy's weakness or landing critical hits, but can also lose turns if attacks miss or are blocked. A Moon Phase System or equivalent, in which phases of the moon or changes in the weather affected the behavior of enemies, is also featured in multiple games.

The layouts of the first two Megami Tensei games were noticeably different from later games: Megami Tensei used a 3D first-person perspective, while Megami Tensei II used a combination of first-person 3D displays for battle and top-down 2D displays for navigation. The change was suggested by staff members who did not want players getting lost in a large 3D environment. The 2D/first person viewpoint continued until Nocturne, which switched to a third-person perspective. This was done due to a condition similar to car sickness called "3D sickness" with first person shooters in Japan at the time: the developers wanted something for players to focus on. A first-person perspective was reintroduced in Strange Journey, and incorporated into IV's battles along with navigable 3D environments.

=== Plots and themes ===
Each title focuses on the extraordinary invading the ordinary world, though the two main Megami Tensei series focus on different things: Shin Megami Tensei focuses more on the main protagonist gaining the power needed to survive in a world ruled over by tyrannical deities, while Persona focuses on interpersonal relationships and the psychology of a group of people. The protagonist is generally male within the Shin Megami Tensei titles: while a female lead or the ability to choose a lead's gender is not out of the question, some staff feel that Shin Megami Tensei lead roles are better suited to a male character. Throughout its lifetime, the series has incorporated elements of Gnosticism, various world mythologies and religions including Christianity and Buddhism, early science fiction, Jungian psychology and archetypes, occultism, goth, punk, and cyberpunk. The science fiction and fantasy elements are brought together and unified through the use of philosophical concepts, enabling a blending of concepts and aesthetics that might normally clash.

The stories of the core Shin Megami Tensei titles frequently include fighting against a tyrannical God. The method of story-telling in the series can involve traditional use of cutscenes and spoken dialogue (Persona, Digital Devil Saga), or a text-based minimalist approach that places emphasis on atmosphere (Nocturne). A tradition within the core Shin Megami Tensei series is to focus on a single playable character as opposed to a group. Alongside other recurring characters is Lucifer, the fallen angel who stands against God and is portrayed in multiple forms to represent his omnipotence. Since Megami Tensei II, the series has used a morality-based decision system, where the player's actions affect the outcome of the story. In Megami Tensei II, the alignments were first defined as "Law" (the forces of God) and "Chaos" (the army of Lucifer). In future games, an additional "Neutral" route was included where the player could reject both sides. Selected games have been thematically or otherwise linked to a particular alignment. Shin Megami Tensei II, due to events prior to the story, focuses on the "Law" alignment. For Nocturne, all the characters were roughly aligned with "Chaos", which was done both to bring variety to the series and allow the development team more creative freedom. Shin Megami Tensei IV: Apocalypse is restricted to a "Neutral" alignment while still having multiple endings. The three-tiered alignment was used in Strange Journey, and continued into Shin Megami Tensei IV.

== Development and history ==
=== Origins ===
The Megami Tensei series began life as a media expansion of the Digital Devil Story series, a trilogy of science-fantasy novels written by Aya Nishitani during the 1980s. The media expansion was handled by Nishitani and his publisher Tokuma Shoten. The game was developed at Atlus and published by Bandai Namco (then Namco). Although they wanted to incorporate as much of the original story as possible, the limited capabilities of the Famicom made this goal nearly impossible. The series' creators were Kouji Okada (credited as Cozy Okada in English), Ginichiro Suzuki, and Ginichiro's son Kazunari. The game proved popular in Japan, and effectively launched the Megami Tensei franchise, with its more ambitious sequel following in 1990. During the development of Shin Megami Tensei, which was driven by the concept of a Super Famicom game with the company's brand on it, the team slowly decided that they wanted to break the then-current gaming status quo using its aesthetic and content. Despite this attitude, the staff considered Shin Megami Tensei to be a remake of Megami Tensei II. In many of these earlier games, staff members at Atlus had cameos.

The majority of the Megami Tensei series is developed by Atlus' R&D Department 1. Other developers have been involved with the series: these include Multimedia Intelligence Transfer (Last Bible series), Lancarse (Strange Journey), CAVE (Imagine) and Nex Entertainment (Nine), and Arc System Works (Persona 4 Arena). Most of the games up to 2003 were handled by Okada, but when he departed to form his own company Gaia, Kazuma Kaneko became the series' creative director. There are two main writers in the franchise: Shogo Isogai and Ryutaro Ito. Ito first worked on Megami Tensei II, joining the team after development to write the script, along with working with the script and being part of the debug team. Isogai's first work for the series was the script for Shin Megami Tensei II. The next entry If... was also written by Ito, and designed as a departure from the grand scale of previous games, instead being set within a cloistered school environment. His final work for the series was the first Devil Summoner. Isogai also worked on Shin Megami Tensei II and If..., and later worked on multiple Devil Summoner games, Nocturne and Strange Journey. The music for the first five main Megami Tensei titles was composed by Tsukasa Masuko. For Nocturne, Shoji Meguro, who had done work on earlier spin-off titles, was brought in. He later became well known for his work on the Persona titles.

=== Art design ===
The demons as seen in Shin Megami Tensei V: Vengeance, including the designs by various Megami Tensei artists

The Shin Megami Tensei and Persona art styles have been defined by two different artists: Kazuma Kaneko and Shigenori Soejima. Kaneko had a long history with the series, having done some work on the original Megami Tensei titles. His first prominent work for the series was on Shin Megami Tensei, who worked on both the sprite art and promotional artwork for the game's characters and demons. He was also responsible for suggesting many of the game's darker features, defining the series' eventual identity. Before designing each demon, Kaneko looks up his chosen subject to get their mythological background, and uses that in their design. Many of Kaneko's demon designs were influenced by both creatures and deities from world mythology, and monsters from popular culture like Godzilla. Alongside working on Shin Megami Tensei II, If... and Nocturne, he also did character designs for the first three Persona games. Kaneko's style has been described as "cold [and] stoic", evolving into that state over time to keep the artwork as close as possible to the in-game render. He states that he mainly does line drawings for the artwork. He starts his artwork with pencil, and then scans them onto a computer so other artists can work on them digitally.

Soejima's first work for the series was as part of the digital coloring team for the first Devil Summoner. He later had minor roles in artwork and character design in the first Persona and Soul Hackers. He later did the secondary characters for the Persona 2 duology, and was also part of the team checking over the PlayStation ports of the first three Shin Megami Tensei games, as well as minor work on Nocturne. Soejima was chosen as the lead designer for Persona 3 by Kaneko, as Kaneko wanted the younger staff members to gain experience. Persona 3 proved challenging for Soejima as he needed to refine his drawing style and take the expectations of series fans into account. He would go on to design for Persona 3/FES and Portable, Persona 4, and Persona 5. Soejima's drawing style is recognized as being lighter-toned than Kaneko's work on the Shin Megami Tensei games.

Other designers have also worked on the series. For Nine, the developers wanted to have a new style to suit the game's original vision, so the characters were designed by animator Yasuomi Umetsu. the new main designer for the series is Masayuki Doi, who had made a name for himself with the Trauma Center series; and designed the main characters for Shin Megami Tensei IV. Inspired in his work by Kaneko's designs, he created the main characters' clothing to be a blend of Japanese and western fashions while incorporating design elements from the Star Wars series. After the success of IV, he went on to become the main demon designer for Shin Megami Tensei IV: Apocalypse and Shin Megami Tensei V, while still retaining his job as lead character designer. For the Devil Survivor games, Atlus were aiming to appeal to a wider audience and reinvigorate the Megami Tensei franchise, hiring Suzuhito Yasuda as character designer for this purpose. Some monsters in the second Devil Survivor were designed by manga artist Mohiro Kitoh.

=== Localization ===
For a long time, the Megami Tensei franchise was not exported to western territories despite there being a recognized market. The original reasons were the heavy religious themes and symbols used, which were considered taboo in western game markets, and Nintendo's strict content guidelines for overseas releases. Later, many of these early works were prevented from coming overseas due to their age, which would have put them at a disadvantage in the modern gaming market. Early entries on the PlayStation were also blocked by Sony of America's then-current approval policies. The first title in the franchise to be localized was Jack Bros.; the first role-playing game in the franchise to receive an overseas release was the first Persona game. This was done to give Atlus' North American branch a flagship RPG franchise that could compete with the likes of Final Fantasy, Suikoden and Breath of Fire. According to Okada, the naming of creatures and enemies was adjusted from the main series and original Japanese release of Persona to make it more acceptable for an overseas audience. Though it managed to establish the franchise overseas, the localization was a taxing task due to a small staff and the need to change multiple aspects to suit a North American audience, including removing references to Japanese culture and changing one character from Japanese to African-American. This, and other changes were fixed in the re-release on the PlayStation Portable. The first Persona 2 title, Innocent Sin, needed to be passed over due to shortage of manpower and the fact that development was focused on the second title, Eternal Punishment.

Nocturne was the first release in the Shin Megami Tensei series to be released overseas. After the release of Nocturne, Atlus' overseas branches decided to add the Shin Megami Tensei moniker to future releases within the Megami Tensei franchise to help market the games. Despite many of the original games not bearing the moniker, it ultimately worked in Atlus' favor as, regardless of title differences, the games chosen for localization were all part of the larger Megami Tensei franchise, and using the core Shin Megami Tensei moniker kept all the titles under a single banner. Before this decision was made, the series was given the localized title Revelations, used for the first Persona and the first Last Bible. Later, changes to titles were made to make them less unwieldy, such as with Raidou Kuzunoha vs. the Soulless Army. Called Raidō Kuzunoha vs. The Super-Powered Army in Japan, the title was altered as it sounded "goofy" in English. By the time Strange Journey was in development, the franchise had a strong presence overseas, so the team created Strange Journey with localization in mind: the two aspects actively linked with this were the game's setting in Antarctica as opposed to modern-day Japan, and the fact that it was not given a numeral. Starting with Shin Megami Tensei IV, the company decided to actively promote the franchise overseas to North America, Europe and mainland Asia. After 2016, due to Atlus USA's merger with Sega of America, Sega took over North American publishing duties, although the Atlus brand remained intact.

In general, Atlus publishes Megami Tensei games in Japan and North America, but as they lack a European branch, they publish titles in the region through third-party companies such as Ghostlight and NIS America. Their latest partnership, after their deal with NIS America ended with the publication of Odin Sphere Leifthrasir, was with European publishing firm Deep Silver to publish multiple titles in the region, including Shin Megami Tensei IV: Apocalypse and Persona 5. Atlus has occasionally published titles digitally in Europe.

== Reception ==
Prior to its popularity in the west, the game was a major franchise in Japan, having sold over four million copies by 2003. Excluding the Persona series, the Megami Tensei series sold approximately 7.2 million copies by October 2017. By October 2018, the Megami Tensei main series has shifted approximately 12.4 million packaged and digital copies (including DL of free-to-play titles) of games worldwide. In addition, the Persona sub-series sold 9.3 million copies, bringing total franchise numbers to 21.7 million units (including DL of free-to-play titles) by 2018. Excluding the Persona series, the Megami Tensei series had supplied 19.2 million copies by 2023, including free-to-play titles. As of 5 March 2024, the Persona series has sold 22.6 million units worldwide. Based on a December 16, 2023 survey conducted by Nikkei Entertainment, the combined fanbase of the Shin Megami Tensei and Persona series within Japan has an average age of 32 years, and a male-to-female ratio that skews 40:60.

Japanese website 4Gamer.net referred to the series as one of Japan's biggest role-playing franchises. UGO Networks writer K. Thor Jensen cited the first Megami Tensei game as the first successful use of cyberpunk aesthetics in video games, saying that the series' mix of science fiction elements and the occult "create a truly unique fictional cyberpunk world". Nintendo Power has noted that Atlus always mixes "familiar gameplay" with surprising settings when creating games for the series, citing Persona, with its "modern-day horror stories" and "teams of Japanese high-school kids", as the perfect example. The editor also added that Strange Journey followed a similar system, calling it a "science-fiction makeover" of the series. In an article about the interaction of Japanese and Western gaming culture, 1UP.com mentioned the Shin Megami Tensei subseries alongside Nippon Ichi Software's Disgaea series. Kurt Kalata wrote: "[They] may not be big sellers, but they've garnered underground success and attracted thousands of obsessed fans." GameSpot writer Andrew Vestal referred to the series as the third biggest RPG series in Japan after Final Fantasy and Dragon Quest. IGN's Matt Coleman mentioned Nocturne in the article "A History of Console RPGs", referring to its content as "challenging stuff for a genre that used to be all about princess saving and evil cleansing".

Digital Devil Story: Megami Tensei II and Shin Megami Tensei both appeared on Famitsu's 2006 "Top 100 Favorite Games of All Time" audience poll at No. 58 and No. 59, respectively. RPGFan's "Top 20 RPGs of the Past Decade" list was topped by the two Digital Devil Saga games, followed by Persona 3 in second place, while Persona 4 ranked fourth place. Kalata, writing for Gamasutra, referred to Nocturne as one of the 20 essential RPGs for players of the genre. GameTrailers cited the Press Turn system as one of the best JRPG battle systems in existence, with particular reference to the version used in Shin Megami Tensei IV.

Alongside its critical acclaim, the series has garnered controversy both in Japan and overseas. Amongst the material cited are its demon negotiation mechanic, depictions of suicide and cannibalism, religious criticism, its use and mixture of Christian and occult imagery, political references, depictions of homosexuality, and its sometimes-strange demon designs. Specific examples have been cited by western journalists. The original release of Persona caused concern due to the title's religious implications. 1UP.com's 2007 game awards, which ran in the March 2008 issue of Electronic Gaming Monthly, Persona 3 was given the "Most controversial game that created no controversy" award: the writers said "Rockstar's Hot Coffee sex scandal and Bully's boy-on-boy kissing's got nothing on this PS2 role-player's suicide-initiated battles or subplot involving student-teacher dating." GamesRadar included the series on its list of "Controversies Waiting to Happen", saying that the lack of public outcry was due to its niche status when compared to other series with similar content. Writing for 1UP.com in a later article, Kalata traced this use of controversial content back to the Digital Devil Story novels, which depicted violence and rape committed by demons, and said that "Such violence is not particularly rare in the land of Japanese animation, but it became even more disturbing in Megami Tensei II. A Chinese game regulation document in 2021 cited Shin Megami Tensei IV: Apocalypse as an example of unsuitable depictions of religious figures.

In a review of the Shin Megami Tensei series in Black Gate, Josh Bycer said "the Shin Megami Tensei series is very similar to Pokémon, in the use of an ever changing party roster. However Shin Megami Tensei did come first and is more mature, both in terms of design and storytelling."
