= Shin Megami Tensei: Liberation Dx2 =

2018 mobile game

- Developer: Sega
- Publisher: Sega
- Director: Keiichi Ono
- Producers: Riichiro Yamada; Furuichi Norio
- Designer: Takashi Ujiie
- Programmer: Tatsuhide Nakakita
- Artists: Tatsuro Iwamoto; Yuichi Higuchi
- Writers: Makoto Fukami; Kazuyuki Yamai
- Composers: Saori Yoshida; Chihiro Aoki
- Series: Megami Tensei
- Engine: Unity
- Platforms: Android, iOS
- Release: JP: 22 January 2018; WW: 24 July 2018
- Genre: Role-playing

Shin Megami Tensei: Liberation Dx2 (Note: Known in Japan as Dx2 Shin Megami Tensei: Liberation (Japanese: D×2 真・女神転生 リベレーション, Hepburn: Dī Tsū Shin Megami Tensei Riberēshon)) is a role-playing video game developed and published by Sega for Android and iOS. It is part of Atlus' Shin Megami Tensei (SMT) series, which in turn is part of the larger Megami Tensei franchise. The plot follows a player-customised character who battles demons with a smartphone app. The game was presented in the 2017's Tokyo Game Show by SEGA and Atlus. It was initially released in January 2018, in Japan, Taiwan, Hong Kong and Macau, and later released worldwide. A mode similar to Pokémon Go was later added after the game's launch, showing demons in augmented reality.

The game received generally favourable reviews, with critics enjoying the game's graphics for a mobile phone system, however, they were less impressed with the quality of the game in comparison to other SMT games.

== Gameplay ==
Dx2 is a role-playing video game, composed of several areas, featuring single-player and online player versus player modes, each one with a different style, from 2- and 3-dimensional dungeon crawling, quests to battle quests, championships and campaigns. The player creates a team of four demons that battle others, using magic spells and physical attacks. It features mechanics found in gacha games, but is based on the Shin Megami Tensei (SMT) series. Battles are turn based, and follows the "press turn" battle system founded in Shin Megami Tensei III: Nocturne. Under the press turn battle system, party members can gain additional moves from exploiting enemy weaknesses.

Dx2 features over 250 demons. All of them can be recruited, summoned through gacha mechanics or fused through normal play, without microtransactions, and have a player rating system in place.

== Plot ==
Dx2 follows the player, who becomes a member of the secret Liberators organisation, a group with members gaining the ability to control demon-like beings, based in Akihabara, Japan. Anyone with this power is known as a Devil Downloader (Dx2). Dx2s are split into two warring factions, the Liberators and the Acolytes. The Liberators are tasked with stopping the Acolytes, who are targeting civilian members of the public who have high empathy. Shin Megami Tensei: Liberation Dx2 follows several members of the Liberators, including schoolgirl Rika Ryuzouji/"Templar Dragon", professional online streamer Taro Fuse/"Megakin", boxer Jeng Yun Tsai/"Kangaroo Boxer", computing student Shiang Sun/"Chalk Eater", light novelist Ririn Ueda/"Eileen", idol Shiori Koden/"Shionyan", retired soldier Gakuto Inoue/"Meat Balloon", and Taoist researcher Seiran Saikawa.

== Release ==
Dx2 was released in Japan, Taiwan, Hong Kong and Macau in January 2018, following a short private beta. The game was eventually released worldwide after a public beta in July 2018. In an interview with producer Yamada Riichiro of Sega, Riichiro commented that he immediately wanted to work with Atlus within the SMT series, and presented a plan to the company for a new release. Riichiro commented that he saw the mobile platforms as a way to expand the audience for SMT, and also to "take advantage" of the free to play model.

The final release of Dx2 had models of over 180 demons. Whilst some of these models were reused from other games in the series, over 40 were developed by Sega for the release. On October 3, 2018, the game was discontinued for Belgian-based players from October 18, 2018, due to anti-gambling laws preventing the free to play model from being implemented.

== Reception ==
Reception

Aggregate score
| Aggregator | Score |
|---|---|
| Metacritic | 78/100 |

Review scores
| Publication | Score |
|---|---|
| Pocket Gamer | 80% |
| 148Apps | 80% |

Dx2 received "generally favorable reviews" according to media review aggregator website Metacritic. The game received high praise for its high graphical content, and its adaptation of the Shin Megami Tensei gameplay. The Verge commented that Dx2 did an "admirable job" of retaining the "soul of SMT", and praised the game for it retaining the same battle mechanics found in other SMT games. Ethan Gatch of Kotaku commented that the game succeeded in being a "console gameplay experience on smartphones".

Dave Aubrey of Pocket Gamer was positive about the game, but felt that it didn't reach the same levels as those of the mainline series of SMT. Aubrey commented that despite the cast being "beautifully designed", the characters were "not as interactive or likeable" as those in other SMT games. Matthew Sholtz of Android Police compared the game to Pokémon, with similar experiences to the series, such as a strength/weakness system, and the ability to catch and evolve monsters. Zack Reese of website RPG Site called the story poor in comparison to other Shin Megami Tensei games, but also stated that Dx2 is "worth playing especially if you’re a series fan."
