= Qadištu =

Ancient Mesopotamian social class

Qadištu were a class of women in ancient Mesopotamian societies. They are commonly understood as priestesses. In Babylonia they occupied a position analogous to the nadītu, and were similarly forbidden from having children, though not from marriage. They additionally acted as midwives and wet nurses. Their role in Assyria and other areas is less clear.

== Background ==
The term qadištu had Akkadian origin and it is derived from the root qdš, "holy". It can be literally translated as "sacred woman". While it is assumed that they fulfilled the role of priestesses, the full extent of their religious duties remains uncertain. They might have specifically been associated with the cult of Adad. They have been compared to other classes of women, such as nadītu or kulmašītu, and the distinction between them is often difficult to make.

According to Marten Stol, qadištu additionally acted as midwives or wet nurses. Support for this proposal has also been voiced by authors such as Fumi Karahashi and Irene Sibbing-Plantholt. They might have also been responsible for abortions. In early scholarship, qadištu were often described as "prostitutes" instead, but this view is no longer accepted by modern Assyriologists.

=== Qadištu and nugig ===
The Sumerogram NU.GIG (𒉡𒍼) could be used to write the term qadištu. Marten Stol argues that in Sumerian texts the term nugig, literally "untouchable", which is well attested as an epithet of deities such as Ninmah, Aruru, Inanna and Ninisina, similarly can be understood as a designation of midwives. Fumi Karahashi notes that this proposal is supported by a passage from the code of Ur-Nammu published in 2011, which explicitly places the nugig among women professionally taking care of children of other people and states that they were responsible for both help with preparations for birth and delivery and for nursing. She assumes the application of this title to Inanna might only reflect what has been described as "aggregation of the duties and rights of all female deities". However, Annette Zgoll notes that as a title of deities, in particular Inanna, Nanaya and Ninisina, nugig occurs chiefly in contexts relevant to the transfer of royal power, which as she argues supports interpreting it as a generic title indicating high status. Stol also acknowledges that nugig could be more generally used as a designation of women of high status.

Zgoll argues that the use of nugig as one of the epithets of Inanna was the reason why it could be alternatively translated in Akkadian as ištarītu, "she who belongs to Ishtar". It has been suggested that these priestesses grew up in temples of Ishtar, but this is uncertain and their role is not well understood. It is known they were responsible for imitating bird calls for cultic purposes. A number of lexical lists explain ištarītu as Emesal gašan, "lady", or gašan-anna, "lady of heaven", rather than nugig, which Zgoll views as further evidence for nugig analogously being understood as an indicator of high status when applied to Inanna.

== Attestations ==
=== Babylonia ===
Qadištu are among the classes of women attested in Old Babylonian sources. One of the sections of the code of Hammurabi (§181) deals with the procedure of dedicating one's daughter to a deity to make her a qadištu (or alternatively nadītu or kulmašītu). Seals and theophoric names indicate Adad was a particularly common choice, sometimes alongside his wife Shala. A letter from Mari mentions a qadištu of Annunitum.

Most qadištu seemingly lived alone. It is known that those associated with Adad were permitted to marry, but not to bear children. It is possible that a mythological justification for the childlessness of qadištu, as well as nadītu and kulmašītu, was provided in Atrahasis, but the relevant passage cannot be restored fully. It remains uncertain whether childlessness necessitated chastity as well. It is also known that in some cases qadištu could adopt children, as attested in the case of Ilša-ḫegal, a wife of the head lamentation singer in Old Babylonian Sippar.

It has been proposed that at least some qadištu were literate. However, this proposal depends on the assumption that school texts found in one of the houses excavated in Sippar which belonged to a qadištu and her brother were copied by her, which remains unproven.

Qadištu and other similar female professionals are for the most part no longer referenced in texts from the first millennium BCE. An exception are anti-witchcraft incantations, where the term qadištu is sometimes applied to opponents of the āšipu. Furthermore, lexical lists treat qadištu as interchangeable with multiple other terms, including nadītu, but also šamuḫtu ("strumpet") which according to Marten Stol indicates the original meaning of many cultic and professional titles was forgotten and they came to be devalued. However, Irene Sibbing-Plantholt notes that it is implausible midwifery ceased to be practiced altogether, as sometimes argued based on the decline of references to qadištu and other relevant groups.

=== Other areas ===
The term qadištu is also attested in sources from Assyria, but it is unclear if it had the same meaning in this context as in Babylonia. Old Assyrian texts from Kanesh appear to treat qadištu as a designation of a man's second wife, and it is used interchangeably with the label amtu (literally "slave girl", here an indicator of lower status than that of the primary wife). Middle Assyrian laws state that married qadištu should wear veils, while unmarried ones are prohibited from doing so. According to Marten Stol, later Assyrian sources indicate the term was no longer understood.

One of the economic texts discovered during excavations in Emar deals with the purchase of a field by a woman designated as qadištu, but it is not known how this term was understood in this city.
