= Nadītu =

Old Babylonian social class

Nadītu (Old Babylonian Akkadian: 𒊩𒈨; sometimes romanized as naditu, with the long vowel omitted) were a social class in ancient Mesopotamia, attested only in the Old Babylonian period. They were associated with the tutelary gods of specific cities, and are often considered to be priestesses by modern authors, though this conclusion is not universally accepted, and it is sometimes argued they should be treated as a fully separate class. The best documented community of nadītu resided in Sippar, where they were associated with the god Shamash. They were not allowed to marry or have biological children, though adoption was permitted. Women did not become nadītu by choice, and it is assumed the institution was meant to constrain their agency. However, in some cases they benefited from this status as they were allowed to manage their own business affairs, which lead to economic empowerment. Groups of nadītu are also attested in other cities, but they were not necessarily subject to the same regulations as in Sippar, for example those in service of Marduk, known from Babylon and other sites, were allowed to marry.

== Terminology and background ==
The term nadītu is a feminine noun derived from Akkadian nadû, "to throw down", "to cast away" or in agricultural context "to leave a field fallow", and on this basis it has been proposed it can be translated as "fallow", here to be understood metaphorically as "barren woman". It could be represented by the Sumerogram LUKUR, which originally designated a type of priestess possibly regarded as the "junior wife" of a god she served. Nadītu are also often described as priestesses in modern Assyriological literature, but this designation is not universally accepted, as while they most likely did spend a part of their day on prayer, there is no other indication that they had religious duties, and they did not prepare religious festivals or maintain temples, which lead to proposals that referring to them as a distinct social class might be preferable to classifying them as a subgroup of clergy. They were dedicated to the god of a specific city, and were expected to reside in it. As argued by Tonia Sharlach, their status can be compared to that of medieval Christian nuns and Marten Stol outright refers to them as "nuns". However, this approach has been criticized by Katrin De Graef, who argues it might lead to a misunderstanding of ancient institutions, and states using the original Akkadian nadītu is preferable.

References to nadītu are present exclusively in texts from the Old Babylonian period. There is no evidence they already existed in the Ur III period, and despite the use of the term lukur to refer to Old Babylonian nadītu there is no indication that the women designated by the former label in the third millennium BCE had a comparable role in society. Most likely, this class only developed in the Old Babylonian period due to social and economic changes.

== In Sippar ==
The best documented community of nadītu lived in Sippar. It is first mentioned around the year 1880 BCE, during the reign of Sumu-la-El. It resided in a so-called gagû, "cloister", which was a quarter of the city located close to the temple of Shamash. They were closely associated with this god and Aya, a goddess regarded as his wife. Their devotion to these deities is well attested in greeting formulas in letters. It is also possible that some of the seals with depictions of Shamash and Aya discovered during excavations in Sippar originally belonged to nadītu.

It is presumed that around 200 nadītu resided in houses in the gagû area, in addition to various officials overseeing them and weaver women employed by the community. Female servants and cooks are also mentioned in a number of sources. Male servants are also attested, though they were not numerous. Some of them were Suteans. The walls surrounding the gagû were most likely monumentally tall, and their repair was considered an accomplishment suitable to commemorate in year names by Babylonian rulers. One example is attested from the fourteenth year of Ammiditana.

In Sippar women typically became nadītu around the age of fifteen. To initiate a girl, a written guarantee that she will be provided for by her family was necessary. The initiation took place during a ceremony held in honor of Shamash known as sebût šattim, and involved placing a rope associated with this god on the arm of a woman entering the cloister. The new nadītu was expected to take on an appropriate name. Amat-Šamaš, "servant of Shamash", was the most popular, though Erišti-Šamaš, "requested by Shamash", is also well attested. Names invoking Aya are known too, for example Erišti-Aya, "requested by Aya". Some of the nadītu hailed from other cities, for example Babylon, Mari or Dilbat, rather than Sippar itself. They also originated in different social classes, with attested relatives including smiths, scribes, doctors, clergymen, military and judicial officials, and in some cases rulers. Daughters of kings Sumulael, Sin-Muballit and Zimri-Lim were nadītu, as was a sister of Hammurabi. However, there is no evidence that women from royal families were regarded as higher-ranked members of the community. Up to three daughters of a single family could become nadītu.

There is no evidence that any nadītu in the service of Shamash were married. As argued by Tonia Sharlach, they were effectively regarded as married into the family of the deity they served, and brought a dowry with them upon initiation, though after the death of a nadītu it was supposed to return to her family, as did anything acquired by her through her life. Therefore, it is possible that sending a daughter to become a nadītu was often a way to secure greater financial security for her brothers, which was a common concern due to economic hardships widespread in the Old Babylonian period. It is not certain if nadītu were expected to remain celibate, as no explicit references to any vows meant to guarantee that are known. They could not have biological children, though the reasons behind this taboo remain unknown. According to Katrin De Graef, at the same time it cannot be ruled out that they were allowed to engage in intercourse which did not result in pregnancy, and additionally two cases of nadītu apparently becoming pregnant and subsequently giving the child up for adoption has been identified. Adoption of children by nadītu was also permitted, with many cases of such a procedure involving either a younger nadītu (either a niece or an unrelated woman) or a slave. For example, a legal text of a nadītu named Erišti-Aya records that she both liberated a certain Surratum and adopted her. Another similar document, dated to the fourteenth year of Ammisaduqa, deals with the emancipation of Narāmtum, the adopted daughter of another nadītu, Ina-libbi-eršet. Adoptive motherhood among nadītu was seemingly primarily an economic institution, and the foster daughters were typically expected to provide their mothers with sustenance in exchange for becoming their heiresses, and in some cases they could be married off in order to acquire bride price (terḫatum). Adopting a daughter could also serve as a way to protect a nadītu's belongings from being seized, for example by creditors of the estate of her father, as directly attested in one case.

Many nadītu seemingly reached elderly age, possibly because their partially secluded lifestyle made it easier for them to avoid epidemics common through the Old Babylonian period, in addition to the presumed religious regulations placed on them shielding them from possible health complications resulting from childbirth. Due to the discovery of school texts in some of their houses, it has been suggested they might have been literate.

Nadītu often relied on the financial support of their families, though there is evidence that some of them took part in business transactions themselves instead. Some of these belonging to the former category at times were not provided with adequate supplies, and records of appeals to kings to save them from starvation have been discovered. Sources from Sippar indicate that nadītu were allowed to manage their own economic affairs. Affluent women whose dowry included real estate and slaves were often able to become richer through the course of their life in the cloister as a result. On this basis it has been argued that while the social structures typical for the Old Babylonian period were meant to constrain their agency, and their status was not a result of free choice, in some cases at least temporarily they were unintentionally subject to economic empowerment which put them economically on par with men. However, by the seventeenth century BCE the economic position of the entire class declined. Their number most likely remained similar as in earlier times, but in contrast with early sources, which typically dealt with the affairs of a relatively small number of wealthy members of their community, each documented in a large number of texts, most of the references pertain to less affluent women, typically mentioned only in a few documents each. It was originally assumed that the gagû in Sippar was abandoned during the reign of Samsuiluna, around 1686 BCE, though subsequent research revealed that it continued to function in the times of Samsuditana. Most likely it started to gradually decline in the aftermath of economic troubles attested during the reign of Abi-Eshuh. However, later economic texts still record many activities undertaken by nadītu, for example leasing out fields, hiring laborers, purchasing slaves, extending loans and less commonly borrowing or leasing. Seth Richardson suggests that this might be an indication that the administrative practices of their community became less centralized with time due to the lack of a strong centralized state overseeing the related institutions. A handful of texts mention what he characterizes as "corporate activity of the gagû", which is the only attestation of collective social or economic activity of women from the end of the Old Babylonian period. The decline of economic status of the nadītu is most likely part of a broader phenomenon which also impacted other classes of women, stemming from long-term impact of the numerous wars waged between 1914 and 1727 BCE, which resulted in widespread impoverishment and militarization of society in the following century.

== In other cities ==
In addition to Sippar, groups of nadītu also resided in other cities, including Babylon, Kish, Nippur and Tell Ishchali, though they were not necessarily subject to the same regulations.

Attestations of nadītu dedicated to the god Marduk, consistently designated as lukur ^{d}amar-utu ká-dingir-ra^{ki}, "nadītu of Marduk of Babylon", are known from between the times of Apil-Sin and Samsu-Ditana. In contrast with these in service of most gods who possessed such devotees, they resided in various locations, including not only his cult center, Babylon, but also Damrum, Dilbat, Isin, Kish, Lagaba, Larsa, Nippur, Sippar, Sippar-Amnanum, Suhu and Ṣupur-Šubula. The wide range of attestations presumably reflects the growth of Marduk's importance through the Old Babylonian period, and the establishment of his cult in various cities. In contrast with their peers dedicated to Shamash, the nadītu in his service did not live in seclusion and were permitted to marry, though they similarly were not allowed to have children. However, they could adopt the children of a secondary wife or servant of their husband. Their status was regulated by the Code of Hammurabi, in which multiple paragraphs are dedicated to regulations pertaining to their marriages, presumably due to lack of applicable customary laws in areas in which they are attested due to the expansion of the Babylonian state. Lucile Barberon speculates that marrying a nadītu of Marduk might have been perceived as a display of willingness to integrate into Babylonian culture promoted by the First Dynasty of Babylon. There is no indication that multiple sisters from within one family could become nadītu of Marduk, in contrast with the evidence pertaining to those connected to Shamash, and outside of Sippar no instances of a single family making one daughter a nadītu of city god and another of Marduk have been identified. A further difference between the nadītu of Shamash and Marduk is the fact that seemingly none of the latter bore theophoric names invoking their god, though some instances of names invoking his temple, Esagil, or the closely associated god Asalluhi have been noted.

In Nippur, local nadītu were associated with the god Ninurta. A single text from dated to the reign of Damiq-ilishu, might mention a nadītu dedicated to the deity Isar-pada instead. Relatively little is known about their social position. Like in Sippar, they were expected to remain unmarried, and similarly could partake in economic activities. They did not change their names after being initiated, and most bore ordinary ones typical for the period, such as Lamasum, Kunutum or Ištar-lamasi. They lived in a separate area of the city, but it was not necessarily organized identically as its counterpart in Sippar, and it is only described as KI.LUKUR.RA, "place of the nadītu".

A gagû overseen by an official referred to as wakil nadiātim in which nadītu dedicated to the local war god Zababa resided existed in Kish. Similarly to the nadītu of Shamash, its inhabitants did not marry.

The texts from Tell Ischali, presumed to be ancient Nerebtum, a city in the kingdom of Eshnunna, do not contain much information about religious officials, but they mention five women designated as nadītu, three of whom, Kurrītum, Amat-Šamaš and Aja-bēlet-mātim, are explicitly identified as being in the service of Shamash.

A purported reference to a nadītu of Ninsianna on a seal from Uruk from the reign of Rîm-Anum is most likely a misreading, as this individual bears the masculine name Bēl-Anum, which alongside the reexamination of the remaining traces of the title lead Andrea Seri to conclude that the office meant was that of gudu_{4}, Akkadian pašīšum, "anointed one", known to be a class of religious personnel.

The position of nadītu has additionally been compared with that of other similar groups of women known from Old Babylonian sources, such as qadištu, kulmašītu and ugbabtu. Marten Stol argues that it is difficult to fully separate these groups.
