= Shin Megami Tensei IV: Apocalypse =

2016 role-playing video game

- North American cover art
- Developer: Atlus
- Publishers: JP: Atlus; NA: Atlus USA; PAL: Deep Silver
- Director: Satoshi Ōyama
- Producer: Kazuyuki Yamai
- Programmer: Yuichi Yoshida
- Artist: Masayuki Doi
- Writers: Yusuke Miyata; Kazuyuki Yamai; Kazuma Kaneko
- Composer: Ryota Kozuka
- Series: Megami Tensei
- Platform: Nintendo 3DS
- Release: JP: February 10, 2016; NA: September 20, 2016; EU: December 2, 2016; AU: December 9, 2016
- Genre: Role-playing
- Mode: Single-player

Shin Megami Tensei IV: Apocalypse (Note: Known in Japan as Shin Megami Tensei IV: Final (Japanese: 真・女神転生IV FINAL; "True Goddess Reincarnation IV: Final")) is a 2016 role-playing video game developed and published by Atlus for the Nintendo 3DS. It is the sequel to Shin Megami Tensei IV, set in a post-apocalyptic alternative world. The game is part of the Shin Megami Tensei series, the central series of the Megami Tensei franchise. The game features gameplay mechanics from previous Shin Megami Tensei releases, such as the Press Turn battle system, where players and enemies fight and exploit weaknesses, allowing either side to gain additional turns or lose them.

The story is set in an alternate timeline of Shin Megami Tensei IV, and focuses on the demon hunter Nanashi, a silent protagonist who dies and is resurrected by the demon Dagda in exchange for becoming his "godslayer". Development began shortly after the release of Shin Megami Tensei IV. It received generally positive reviews from critics, who praised the game's feel and quality of life changes from Shin Megami Tensei IV. The game sold approximately half of the debut sales for Shin Megami Tensei IV during its first week, which was still considered successful for a non-numbered series entry.

== Gameplay ==
A battle: enemies are displayed on the top screen, and the player's party and partner on the bottom screen.

In Shin Megami Tensei IV: Apocalypse, the player controls the demon hunter Nanashi as they explore locations including a post-apocalyptic Tokyo and the medieval kingdom Mikado. The setting, most demons, and a large number of mechanics are carried over from the game's predecessor Shin Megami Tensei IV. The player navigates local environments with a third-person perspective, with the aid of an overhead worldmap. Battles take place from a first-person perspective, and are triggered either through story sequences or encountering enemy sprites in the environment. The party gains experience points and levels up by winning battles and completing quests. When the protagonist gains a level, he is given skill points allotted to five different statistics which alter how he performs in battle. When in battle, Nanashi has a party of three demons and a "Partner", an automated companion with a unique demon roster, giving them a different set of abilities.

During battle, both player and enemy actions are governed by the turn-based Press Turn System, a battle system carried over from previous entries in the Shin Megami Tensei series. The system revolves around exploiting physical or elemental weaknesses, and landing critical attacks: if a character strikes another character's weak point or deals a critical hit, the party gains an extra turn, while if the attack is absorbed or blocked, they lose their turn. If a party member from either side ambushes the enemy, strikes a weakness or gets a critical hit, they may enter "Smirk" status: Smirking temporarily increases a character's damage, eliminates their elemental weaknesses, and guarantees their next attack will land as a critical hit. It also grants temporary bonuses to a character's skills.

In addition to fighting demons, they can also be persuaded to join the player's side, as the only way to gather a party. If a demon does not immediately attack, it is open to negotiation and can be persuaded to join. If a demon agrees to join but Nanashi's level is too low, another demon is called in to take the first demon's place. Once part of the party, demons can engage in dialogue, and grant skills and bonuses to Nanashi. Certain abilities also effect the demon's health, magic and elemental resistances, with certain attack types either inflicting penalties or granting additional status buffs. Two or more demons can be fused into a new form, granting new abilities. During fusion, players can choose which skills are retained and which are discarded.

== Synopsis ==
=== Setting and characters ===
Shin Megami Tensei IV: Apocalypse takes place in 2038 in Japan, within the same setting as Shin Megami Tensei IV. Twenty-five years prior, a devastating war was waged between the league of angels and the demonic armies of Lucifer. To protect Tokyo from damage, a great rock dome was created. While it protected Tokyo, resources became progressively scarcer over the following years, while angels and demons ruled over humans.

The story incorporates folklore from ancient religions, including deities such as Krishna, Maitreya, Odin, and YHVH. The game's silent protagonist is the teenage demon hunter cadet named Nanashi. He is killed while on a demon hunt and he is contacted in the afterlife by the demon Dagda, who offers to restore the protagonist to life in exchange for becoming his "godslayer". When returned to life, he is manipulated by Dagda and Odin into freeing Krishna from a prison made by YHVH, who forms an alliance of various polytheistic deities called the Divine Powers, for the claimed purpose of saving humanity and opposing Merkabah and Lucifer. The storyline takes follows from the beginning of the previous game's neutral route: protagonist Flynn and his companion Isabeau have chosen to ally with the people of Tokyo, while Flynn's former companions Jonathan and Walter have respectively become the hosts for Merkabah, leader of God's angelic forces, and Lucifer, ruler of the demon hordes. There are multiple endings, with both of the primary endings being neutral; the game's law and chaos endings serve as abridged conclusions to the story.

=== Plot ===
In post-apocalyptic Tokyo, Nanashi is killed by demons. In the afterlife, a demon named Dagda offers to resurrect him in exchange for his service as a Godslayer. Shortly afterward, Nanashi and his friend Asahi are manipulated into unsealing Krishna, a ruthless deity who intends to destroy the universe and create a new one free of YHVH's influence. Krishna takes Asahi hostage in order to force Flynn to surrender to him, intending to force Flynn to become his own Godslayer. He also unleashes the monstrous serpent Shesha to begin harvesting human souls for his plans. Nanashi and Asahi set out to defeat Krishna and Shesha.

The Divine Powers activate the Tokugawa Mandala, an ancient seal placed in Tokyo, which disables the Hunters' Demon Summoning Program and leaves them helpless; however, thanks to Dagda's power, Nanashi remains able to summon demons. The Divine Powers attack the humans' underground shelters, and Asahi's father is killed. Nanashi and his companions break the Tokugawa Mandala, defeat Krishna and Shesha at his base in Tsukiji Konganji, and rescue Flynn. The party then sets out to defeat Merkabah and his angels, as well as Lucifer and his demons. Nanashi has the option of siding with Merkabah, Lucifer, or humanity. Supporting Merkabah will destroy Tokyo and transform Mikado into the new Kingdom of God, while supporting Lucifer will destroy Mikado and plunge the world into anarchy. Nanashi can lead humanity to victory if he kills both Lucifer and Merkabah in a massive three-way battle.

During the celebration afterwards, Flynn murders the surviving Demon Hunters. He reveals himself to be Shesha, reincarnated in Flynn's form, and explains that Krishna faked his own defeat to manipulate the Hunters into eliminating the angels and demons; the real Flynn remains in Krishna's clutches. Shesha murders Asahi and transforms into the Cosmic Egg, a giant object that will hatch into Krishna's new universe when the full moon rises. The party storms the Cosmic Egg to defeat Krishna and his Divine Powers once and for all. Inside the Egg, Dagda reveals his plan to hijack it and create his own universe where all humans are completely independent from one another, and demands Nanashi's aid in his plan. Dagda's mother, Danu, opposes him and wants Nanashi to destroy the Egg.

- Bonds Route: If Nanashi rebels against Dagda, Danu revives Dagda in line with their ideals, and Nanashi kills Dagda's dark side. The true Dagda then resurrects all of Shesha's victims, including Asahi. The group then kills Krishna, rescues Flynn, and destroys the heart of the egg. As the group begins to celebrate, Stephen appears and reveals that one more enemy is standing between humanity and true freedom: YHVH, the creator god. Stephen opens a portal to YHVH's universe, and Nanashi and Flynn invade his realm. They undergo a trial from YHVH's second-in-command, Satan, and are deemed worthy to confront YHVH. Satan temporarily resurrects Flynn's old friends Walter and Jonathan to aid them, and the group battles and destroys YHVH once and for all. Afterwards, humanity is finally freed from the gods and demons, forming a new peace forged by Tokyo and Mikado.
- Massacre Route: If Nanashi sides with Dagda, his friends turn against him, and he is forced to kill them all. Nanashi defeats and executes Krishna, and Flynn is killed in the battle. The Cosmic Egg hatches into Dagda's new universe, and he appoints Nanashi as its new Creator. Afterwards, Stephen appears and explains that the new universe cannot fully come to fruition until YHVH is killed and the old universe destroyed. Dagda resurrects Flynn and a companion of Nanashi's choice to be brainwashed into serving as his Godslayer and Goddess, respectively. After defeating the remaining Hunters, Nanashi invades YHVH's universe and kills him. The old universe dies and is reborn as a new universe where humans are free from all outside influence. Dagda fades away, leaving Nanashi to rule his new creation.

== Development ==
Shin Megami Tensei IV: Apocalypse was created as the developers wanted to see what they could do with the characters from IV. They decided to make a new title as opposed to an upgraded re-release. Production began after development ended for Shin Megami Tensei IV in 2013. As part of their development, the team looked at player feedback with their goal being to make "the number one RPG on the 3DS". Multiple staff from the original game returned, including producer Kazuyuki Yamai, character designer Masayuki Doi, and soundtrack composer Ryota Kozuka. Satoshi Oyama, who had worked on Shin Megami Tensei IV as main programmer, was assigned as director. The game's world and basic scenario were created by Kazuma Kaneko, while the script was written by Yusuke Miyata.

The story's main themes are making or breaking bonds with others, and the advent of "inevitable reality", with a key word in the story being "deicide", the concept may be used for any act of killing a god. An element of the story was the idea of deities from polytheistic deity factions fighting back against being subsumed by the monotheistic Abrahamic deities. Demon designs from the previous game were refined, including the characters Medusa, Merkabah and Lucifer. Doi designed the deity figures based on the traditions surrounding them in their native mythologies. The coloration of polytheistic deities was likewise influenced by beliefs surrounding colors from their native lands. The human forms of Merkabah and Lucifer were based around the idea of the monotheistic factions drawing power from human faith. The game's main protagonist was originally designed to be much older, with his adult design carrying over into one of the game's non-playable characters. Instead, the protagonist was made into a teenager so as to better relate the game's themes of immaturity. Tying into the game's themes is the fact that the main protagonist comes from a far lower-class, less elite force than the protagonist of Shin Megami Tensei IV. The music was handled by composer Ryota Kozuka, who had previously worked as composer for Shin Megami Tensei IV. He worked on Apocalypse alongside his work arranging tracks for Persona 4: Dancing All Night.

For its North American release, the game was outfitted with an English dub, and the subtitle was changed from "Final" to "Apocalypse". The localization took its time to select a name that would give the same implications as the Japanese title while being easier for Western players to understand. Among the titles that needed to be turned down were "End War" due to copyright issues and "Holy War" due to potential backlash. As an "A" symbol was incorporated into the logo, they decided on a word beginning with A. The title "Apocalypse" was reached after much discussion. For about two weeks during this process, the team considered dropping the game's numeral as had been done with Nocturne.

== Promotion and release ==
The game was first teased through the main website for Shin Megami Tensei IV: when a specific hashtag had been forwarded through Twitter 15,000 times, a rocky surface hiding the title would break and reveal its secret. The game was eventually revealed on October 5, 2015, when development was approximately 90% complete. The game was released for the Nintendo 3DS in Japan on February 10, 2016, and in North America on September 20, 2016. It was also released in the PAL region by Deep Silver, on December 2, 2016 in Europe and on December 9 in Australia. North American pre-orders and launch day copies included a set of three metal emblem pins in the forms of a peace symbol, an anarchy symbol, and Dagda's mark.

== Reception ==
Reception

Aggregate scores
Aggregator	Score
Metacritic	84/100
OpenCritic	90% recommend

Review scores
Publication	Score
Destructoid	8.5/10
Eurogamer	9/10
Famitsu	9/10, 9/10, 8/10, 9/10
Game Informer	85%
GameSpot	9/10
Nintendo Life	9/10
Polygon	7.5/10
USgamer	4/5

Shin Megami Tensei IV: Apocalypse was generally well received by critics, according to the review aggregator website Metacritic. It was the highest selling game in Japan during its debut week, with an estimated 96,300 copies sold. These sales figures were approximately half of the debut sales for Shin Megami Tensei IV, and were noted by Siliconera as a good performance for a Shin Megami Tensei game outside of new, numbered entries.

Reviewers were impressed with the games visuals, with Heidi Kemp of GameSpot stating Apocalypse had an "amazing sense of visual design". USGamer's Jeremy Parish praised the game and called it one of the most "uniquely realistic games on 3DS". Luca Forte writing for Eurogamer Italy called the visuals detailed and pleasant and a definite improvement from IV. However, Chris Carter writing for Destructoid stated the graphics were "drab", attributing this to the limitations of the 3DS.

The game received a lot of comments on its quality of life upgrades from those found in the previous title. Parish praised the modifications to gameplay, while Forte noted the improvements to the game's map system. Kemp for GameSpot praised the game for its "host of improvements to its core gameplay that immensely improves the experience of demon hunting and exploration".

The in-game universe of Apocalypse was criticized for being too similar to that of the previous game. Writing for Game Informer, Daniel Tack commented that "other than the story, not a whole lot is new" with Apocalypse. Morgan Sleeper, however, for Nintendo Life described it as a "sequel-of-sorts" whilst Forte wrote that the game was "not a sequel or even a DLC, but a masterpiece".
