= Shin Megami Tensei IV =

2013 role-playing video game

- North American cover art
- Developer: Atlus
- Publishers: JP/NA: Atlus; PAL: Sega
- Director: Kazuyuki Yamai
- Programmer: Satoshi Ōyama
- Artists: Eiji Ishida; Masayuki Doi
- Writers: Shinji Yamamoto; Kazuyuki Yamai
- Composers: Ryota Kozuka; Kenichi Tsuchiya; Toshiki Konishi
- Series: Megami Tensei
- Platform: Nintendo 3DS
- Release: JP: May 23, 2013; NA: July 16, 2013; PAL: October 30, 2014
- Genre: Role-playing
- Mode: Single-player

Shin Megami Tensei IV (Note: Japanese: 真・女神転生IV, Hepburn: Shin Megami Tensei Fō; lit. True Goddess Reincarnation IV) is a role-playing video game developed and published by Atlus for the Nintendo 3DS. The game is the fourth mainline entry in the Shin Megami Tensei series, the central series of the Megami Tensei franchise, though no direct story connection exists to previous entries. It was released in May and July 2013 for Japan and North America respectively. It was released digitally in PAL territories (via Sega Europe) in October 2014. The gameplay is reminiscent of previous Shin Megami Tensei games, carrying over the turn-based Press Turn battle system, where players and enemies fight and exploit weaknesses, allowing either side to gain additional turns or lose them.

The story focuses on Flynn, a samurai who protects the medieval Kingdom of Mikado from attacks by hostile demons. When a mysterious Black Samurai begins transforming the population into demons, Flynn and three companions are sent to capture her. The pursuit of the Black Samurai drags Flynn and his comrades into a startling revelation and a power struggle between angelic and demonic forces.

Development began after the completion of Shin Megami Tensei: Strange Journey, with the team deciding to make a fourth numbered entry in the series based on fan requests. The team intended to evoke the style and feeling of the original Shin Megami Tensei. The main characters and some demons were designed by Masayuki Doi, previously known for his work on the Trauma Center series, changing from series veteran Kazuma Kaneko, whose series demon artwork is still featured alongside a host of guest artists' demon designs. It debuted to strong sales in Japan and was one of the better-selling games of the year. Reception of the game has been generally positive in both Japan and the West.

== Gameplay ==
Screenshot of a battle in Shin Megami Tensei IV, showing the enemy, the party, and the Press Turn system in action

Shin Megami Tensei IV puts the player in control of the samurai Flynn. Navigation takes place both in the third-person perspective with 3D-rendered environments and a 3D overhead overworld map. On the overworld map, icons represent the player party and enemy demons. Battles take place from a first-person perspective, with the enemy visible on the upper screen and party status and commands on the lower screen. As with other role-playing video games, the character grows stronger and advances by completing quests; they also earn macca, an in-game currency to buy items and equipment. Some quests relate to the main story and are mandatory, while other quests are optional. Should the player be defeated, they can return to the game by spending macca (the in-game currency). Nintendo 3DS Play Coins can be used in place of macca. Repeatedly dying unlocks an easy mode: in this mode, the player can flee from battle if they choose.

Enemies wander the environments Flynn explores. A battle starts when Flynn strikes an enemy (granting the player an advantage), an enemy runs into Flynn from the side or behind (granting the advantage to the enemy), or when they run into each other head-on. In battle, the player controls Flynn and three demons, with one AI-controlled human support character. During battle, both player and enemy actions are governed by the turn-based Press Turn System, a battle system carried over from previous entries in the Shin Megami Tensei series. The system revolves around exploiting physical or elemental weaknesses: if a character strikes another character's weak point or deals a critical hit, the party gains an extra turn, while if the attack is absorbed or blocked, they lose their turn. If a character strikes a weakness or gets a critical hit, there is a chance they will enter "Smirk" status: Smirking temporarily increases a character's damage, eliminates their elemental weaknesses, and gives them a high probability of dodging attacks.

Other systems continuing from previous entries in the series are Demon Recruitment and Demon Fusion. To recruit demons, the player talks with a demon instead of fighting them, and must negotiate for their services: these negotiations can involve flattery, bribery, or threats. Demon Fusions allow the player to take two demons and fuse them into a new form, granting new abilities. During fusion, players can choose which skills are retained and which are discarded. The demon's fusion history is recorded for players to look over during the later stages of the game. Negotiation and Fusions also grant experience points for the player. Some demons change forms on their own without needing fusion; instead, they must be leveled up with experience in battle. As Flynn levels up, new fusions become available. Tamed demons teach new skills to Flynn. Using the Nintendo 3DS' StreetPass system, players can trade demons.

== Synopsis ==
=== Setting and characters ===
Shin Megami Tensei IV takes place in a world separate from the rest of the Shin Megami Tensei games, even though recurring demons and abilities are present. The two main locations are the Eastern Kingdom of Mikado, a feudal society inspired by Medieval Europe which is secretly controlled by angels; and Tokyo, a modern-era city enclosed in a rock dome and overrun by demons. Before the game's events, when Tokyo became a demon stronghold and was threatened with destruction by angels, a member of Tokyo's Counter-Demon Force tamed the God Masakado (マサカド), fusing with him to create the protective dome over Tokyo. Mikado is built on the dome's surface. After the dome is created, only twenty years pass in Tokyo while over a thousand years pass in the Kingdom of Mikado. Remnants of Tokyo's technology, studied by the Mikado church as "mystic relics", remain scattered throughout the land.

Players control a Samurai who is the reincarnation of Tokyo's savior. His default name is Flynn (フリン, Furin): as with previous Megami Tensei player characters, he is a silent protagonist, with his actions and attitudes determined by the player. Three other characters accompany Flynn on his journey, representing the game's three main moral alignments. They are Jonathan (ヨナタン, Yonatan), representing "Law"; Walter (ワルター, Warutā), representing "Chaos"; and Isabeau (イザボー, Izabō), representing "Neutrality". Other important characters include Navarre (ナバール, Nabāru), a rookie Samurai; Burroughs (バロウズ, Barouzu), Flynn's AI assistant; Lilith (リリス, Ririsu), a powerful demon from Tokyo; and Issachar (イサカル, Isakaru), a former childhood friend of Flynn's.

=== Story ===
Shin Megami Tensei IV begins with Flynn and his friend Issachar traveling to Mikado Castle to undergo a test as to whether they are worthy of becoming Samurai, the guardians of Mikado who both confront and control demons. Issachar fails, yet Flynn succeeds and is promptly initiated along with other candidates, including Walter, Jonathan, Navarre, and Isabeau. The new Samurai apprentices receive electronic gauntlets containing A.I.s: Flynn's A.I., Burroughs, supports him throughout the game with advice. Shortly after their initiation, unrest rises in the countryside as a figure calling herself the "Black Samurai" distributes books written to spread "knowledge and wisdom"; some residents of Mikado, including Issachar, are turned into demons after reading the books at gatherings called "Sabbaths". The Samurai are sent to confront the resulting demons and the Black Samurai. After restoring order to Mikado and killing Issachar, the Samurai are told to pursue her to the legendary land that lies beneath Mikado, Tokyo. The Samurai climb down a tunnel that leads to the top of a skyscraper; they discover Tokyo is a city covered by a rock dome that has enclosed it in eternal night, while Mikado lies upon the surface of the dome.

The party explores Tokyo searching for the Black Samurai, confronting a variety of foes: the demons that infest Tokyo; the Ashura-kai, a yakuza organization who rule the city and provide a semblance of order; and the Ring of Gaea, a cult dedicated to its leader Yuriko. The party discovers that the Black Samurai is Yuriko, a demon whose true name is Lilith, and that she seeks to bring chaos to the Eastern Kingdom of Mikado and undermine its ordered, stagnant structure. On the orders of Sister Gabby, a member of Mikado's church, the party rescues Uriel, Raphael, and Michael from Tokyo; Gabby later reveals herself to be Gabriel. Walter is convinced by Yuriko that the Ashura-kai should be defeated and more demons unleashed on Tokyo, while Jonathan is convinced by Gabby that Lilith must be slain. Flynn can support either Walter or Jonathan, but regardless of his choice, both are successful: both Lilith's Ring of Gaea and the Ashura-kai are defeated, and demons are released into Tokyo via the Yamato Perpetual Reactor, a device that is supposed to be an energy source connecting parallel dimensions. Flynn, Jonathan, and Walter explore two different timelines of Tokyo: one where law dominates, and another where chaos reigns supreme. In both of them, Flynn's previous incarnation was slain.

After viewing the alternate worlds, a score based on Flynn's moral choices throughout the game decides whether the player is on the Law path, Chaos path, or Neutral path. At this point, the player can side with either Law or Chaos routes; the latter choice causes Isabeau return to stop Flynn on behalf of humanity, but after he defeats her, she dies by suicide.

- In the White ending, Flynn destroys the world at the behest of The White, personifications of human despair who desire complete oblivion.
- If Flynn sides with Law, Jonathan allies with the archangels, the "new leaders" of Mikado, and merges into Merkabah, God's chariot. In order to prevent further corruption by the people of Mikado, he and Merkabah defeat Lucifer to destroy Tokyo, killing themselves in the process.
- If Flynn sides with Chaos, Walter allies and merges with Lucifer, the most powerful demon; they seek to destroy Mikado, and he and Lucifer defeat Merkabah. After destroying Mikado, the two begin a new war against God.
- In the Neutral route, Flynn and Isabeau join forces against Merkabah and Lucifer, enlisting Masakado's help against them. After Merkabah's defeat, Isabeau evacuates Mikado's population to Tokyo. After Flynn defeats Lucifer, Masakado uses his fully awakened power to remove and assimilate the enclosing dome, which erases Mikado and restores daylight to Tokyo, bringing the people of both sides together as one in a united Tokyo.

== Development ==
Development of Shin Megami Tensei IV began around August 2009, after development had finished on Shin Megami Tensei: Strange Journey for the Nintendo DS, and lasted for three and a half years. After listening to fan demand, Atlus decided to make a fourth numbered entry in the Shin Megami Tensei subseries, something not seen in Japan since the release of Shin Megami Tensei III: Nocturne in 2003. The reason for the ten-year gap between III and IV was that the company had made other successful titles, and had not had the time to develop Shin Megami Tensei IV as well. It was planned from an early stage for Shin Megami Tensei IV to be on a portable platform for reasons of player convenience; it was originally planned to be developed for the Nintendo DS using the Strange Journey engine, but eventually development was moved to the Nintendo 3DS, which led to the decision to use a different engine. The development team, which was dubbed Team Maniacs, included both staff who had worked on previous Shin Megami Tensei titles and newer staff who had not. There were differences in thinking between the two, which led to conflicts. As an example of this, game director Kazuyuki Yamai said that some of the staff would be used to contemporary games featuring "sweet" female characters who "say nice things", and as a result would want to add that "sweetness" to Shin Megami Tensei IV; meanwhile, Yamai saw the series as having "bitter" content, and thought that it would not be possible to add "sweetness" to it. Additionally, the staff members had differing images of the meaning of Shin Megami Tensei; Yamai thought that the good points of each staff member's interpretation should go into the aspects of the game they were in charge of, while not deviating from the "bitterness".

The concept of the game was inspired by the punk feeling the original Shin Megami Tensei was emulating when it released. Kazuma Kaneko, a character designer and scenario writer for the series, came up with the original scenario. He came up with the original concept for the medieval Mikado and modern-day Tokyo: the main reason for this was to present a contrast of values between the demon-hunting inhabitants of Mikado and the people of Tokyo, who live under the demons' control. While constructing the setting of the game, the development team referenced history books to learn about medieval customs and armor. The demons appearing in the game were chosen based on what bosses would be appearing in the scenario; they also included some demons that they thought would grab players' attention, and some based on their popularity. While Strange Journey's dungeon traversal had been designed to be "old-school Megami Tensei", Shin Megami Tensei IV's was designed to be similar to that of Nocturne. The Press Turn battle system, first introduced in Nocturne, was given an overhaul. The gameplay difficulty was designed to be adjustable to tempt new players to try out the Shin Megami Tensei series, which had gained a reputation for having a high difficulty. Also for the benefit of newer players was a "recommended fusion" feature; it was implemented after seeing that a lot of players who were new to the series would not fuse their demons. The story and gameplay were designed to try and change the opinion of the Japanese player base that "social games" were good enough, and to appeal to an older generation of players.

Eiji Ishida, who worked on Nocturne and Strange Journey, acted as the game's art director. Masayuki Doi designed the main characters. Doi had worked on the series before as an environment designer for Nocturne, but this was his first time as a character designer for the series. He was brought on due to his work on the Trauma Center series. The main characters were designed around certain archetypes: Jonathan and Walter was designed to represent law and chaos respectively, while Isabeau represents neutrality. Burroughs (an evolution of the AI companion from Strange Journey), Isabeau and other female characters were also designed to be strong-willed and have a strong physique, being based on "strong female archetypes". The protagonist's clothing was created to be fairly bland, emphasizing the player's control over his actions and portrayal. Their outfits were designed to both represent the Kingdom of Mikado and elements of traditional Japanese clothing. The final design included a combination of eastern and western clothing elements. Their battle stances and the handles of their katanas were inspired by the Jedi of the Star Wars franchise. His design work was inspired by earlier designs by Kaneko. Doi also designed the accessories and equipment for the main protagonist and clothing for half the non-playing characters. The demon designs were handled by multiple designers, including Doi, Keita Amemiya, Yoshihiro Nishimura and Kyouma Aki; as Yamai liked Super Sentai and Kamen Rider, and aimed to have some demons matching Kaneko's designs and some inspired by the Ultraman series, several of the chosen demon designers were tokusatsu artists. The artists were sent materials so they would understand the mythological backgrounds of the demons, but were otherwise free in designing the demons according to their own interpretations.

=== Music ===
The music to Shin Megami Tensei IV was composed and arranged primarily by Ryota Kozuka, with additional compositions by Kenichi Tsuchiya and Toshiki Konishi. Their work began late in the development period and lasted roughly a year. They originally set a limit on the number of tracks at Yamai's request, but as the work progressed, the number of tracks ballooned. Motifs from earlier Shin Megami Tensei games were also incorporated to add an air of familiarity for fans of the series. A four-CD soundtrack was released in Japan in February 2014 by Mastard Records. It reached #64 in the Oricon charts and remained on the charts for two weeks.

== Reception ==
Reception

Aggregate scores
Aggregator	Score
GameRankings	84.03% (Note: Based on 37 reviews.)
Metacritic	83/100 (48 reviews)

Review scores
Publication	Score
Destructoid	9.5/10
Eurogamer	8/10
Famitsu	9/10, 9/10, 10/10, 9/10
Game Informer	8.5/10
GameSpot	8.0/10
IGN	8.5/10
Joystiq	4/5

In its first week of release in Japan, the game topped the weekly chart with sales of 188,562 copies, overtaking PlayStation 3 exclusive Kamen Rider: Battride War (2nd) and the PS3 port of Resident Evil: Revelations. In a later assessment, this was cited as Atlus' second best-selling title in recent history, just 4000 units behind the debut sales of Persona 4 in 2008. By the end of 2013, the game had sold 251,334 copies in Japan, and was the country's 30th best-selling video game of the year. By January 2014, the game had sold 90,000 copies in the United States since its release in July. By July 2015, over 600,000 copies had been sold worldwide.

The title has received positive reviews in both Japan and internationally. Aggregate site Metacritic gave it a ranking of 83/100 based on 48 critic reviews. The battle system received universal praise: Famitsu, IGN, GameSpot, Eurogamer, Joystiq, Destructoid, and Game Informer all cited the battle system as highly enjoyable despite difficulty spikes and praised the game making allowances for newcomers. (Note: See Destructoid, Eurogamer, Famitsu, Game Informer, GameSpot, IGN, and Joystiq) The negotiation and fusions systems were also praised, with several reviewers noting it as both entertaining and an improvement on previous versions. A gameplay aspect that received criticism was navigation via the overworld map, which was called either difficult to follow or poorly designed.

The story and characters had a mixed reception: while Destructoid was generally positive, other reviews such as Eurogamer and Game Informer felt that the characters were only there to represent the player's moral pathways. IGN, Joystiq, and GameSpot were fairly negative about them, calling them either irritating or forgettable. The graphics, while praised by some reviewers, were sometimes seen as either "bland" or "of low quality".

== Sequel ==
A follow-up game, Shin Megami Tensei IV: Apocalypse was released for the Nintendo 3DS in 2016. It features mostly the same core gameplay as its predecessor with some changes, introduces a new set of characters, including a new protagonist, in addition to the returning cast, and tells a story that serves as an alternate version of events in the same world. A special physical edition titled Double Hero Pack, that contains both Shin Megami Tensei IV games, was released in April 2018 in Japan.
