= Characters of the Devil May Cry series =

Fictional character

The recurring characters from Devil May Cry as seen: Vergil in background, Trish, Dante and Lady, in the middle, and Nero in the bottom

Devil May Cry is a series of video games set in the present, created by Hideki Kamiya, a video-game designer and developed by his employer Capcom and Clover Studio. The series' success has led to comic books, novelizations, two anime series, guides, collectibles and a variety of action figures. The first game focuses on devil hunter Dante's mission to avenge the death of his mother, Eva, by exterminating demons. In the process he encounters his long-lost twin brother, Vergil, with whom he has a dysfunctional relationship. As the story progresses, Dante encounter his father's nemesis, a demon emperor, Mundus, who is found to be responsible for the murder of Dante's mother.

Years after the first game, Capcom developed new Devil May Cry games with new characters. In Devil May Cry 2, an older Dante aids a woman named Lucia in freeing a town from the demons. In Devil May Cry 3: Dante's Awakening, a younger Dante awakens his demonic powers when confronting his brother and matures upon seeing Lady, a woman struggling to redeem her family. Devil May Cry 4 and Devil May Cry 5 focus on a young demon hunter named Nero who is related to Dante, as well as V, a young man who contracts Dante to hunt down a powerful demon, and later himself becomes entangled in a struggle to save Red Grave City and its inhabitants from the demon Urizen, which comprises the events of the latter game. Ninja Theory also created a reboot titled DmC: Devil May Cry that follows an alternate version of Dante as he learns of his heritage while confronting demons controlling Limbo.

The series has been adapted into animation twice, the first time in 2007, as a canonical anime series developed for Madhouse, as a sequel whose events are set between Devil May Cry and the then-unreleased Devil May Cry 4, and the second time in 2025 as Netflix series, set in a new continuity portraying new versions of these established characters, including new characters.

Nero and several characters in Devil May Cry 2 and the later games were conceived by several staff members, most notably Bingo Morihashi with designers Daigo Ikeno and Tatsuya Yoshikawa, taking over. While each game changes the cast's designs, the RE Engine was used for Devil May Cry 5 to give them a more realistic look. Dante's characterization and role in the games was well received by game journalists with the recurring cast being praised since Devil May Cry 3 because of the handling of the narrative.

== Conception and influences ==
Series creator Hideki Kamiya said that the title character from the manga series Cobra, by Buichi Terasawa, was the basis for Dante. Dante wears a red cloak to make the character's actions more eye-catching; red is the traditional Japanese color for a hero. The game is very loosely based on the Italian poem the Divine Comedy by its use of allusions, including the game's protagonist Dante (named after Dante Alighieri) and other characters like Vergil (Virgil) and Trish (Beatrice Portinari). Dante and Lucia dressed in Diesel fashions appealed to the developers.

Shortly after the release of Devil May Cry 2, Hideaki Itsuno decided Capcom's staff should develop a new video game, Devil May Cry 3: Dante's Awakening. Morihashi was once again employed, but this time took on a bigger role during the game's development. As he had no experience planning, he was given the role of writing the scenario. The game's main character, Dante, was given a different characterization than in the first Devil May Cry because his original creator, Hideki Kamiya, was not going to be involved with the project. While feeling his own take on the character did not equal the popularity of the original one, Bingo Morihashi enjoyed Dante's role in the game. Morihashi felt challenged creating the character of Vergil since he had no prior design experience yet he had to come up with an entire new one for the artists. Dante and Vergi's Devil Trigger forms were designed by Kazuma Kaneko of Atlus. The Capcom staff was impressed with Kaneko's work, and Daigo Ikeno felt that it was not difficult to model.

Early concept art for Devil May Cry, showing Dante with a submachine gun

Devil May Cry 4 producer Hiroyuki Kobayashi said before the game's release that he wanted to make Dante appear more powerful than the other protagonist, Nero, to contrast the strength of a "veteran" with that of a "rookie". The series' storyline also required Dante to demonstrate his power after the first game and its prequel, Devil May Cry 3: Dante's Awakening. Kobayashi said, "When creating a sequel, you don't want to make a character weak again from the start for no good reason. Everyone wanted to see Dante be just as powerful as they remembered him," emphasizing that playing as Dante without his previous abilities would otherwise feel "very strange". Both main characters' capabilities were part of the series' early development.

Several weapons in the series are character-specific. Character designer Tatsuya Yoshikawa said, "When working on this sort of game, the design doesn't come from just one person, it is necessary to take the history of the series and the feelings of the fans into consideration." Before designing the characters in Devil May Cry 4, Yoshikawa consulted staff members who had previously worked on the series to familiarize himself with previous elements. The characters were designed to emphasize their motion, and some demonic antagonists in Devil May Cry 4 resemble angels. These characters were designed to be attractive, while providing a contrast to other demons in the game. Yoshikawa noted that several main characters were somewhat difficult to design, but Nero was one of the greatest challenges of his career since the character would have to be accepted by the public and fit in the series' universe.

With regard to Devil May Cry 5, because the game's narrative was focused on Dante, Nero and V, Lady and Trish could not appear as playable characters again. In addition, Capcom's Matt Walker claimed Vergil would not be a playable character in the game, leaving "a bitter taste" in fans mouths. Itsuno explained the development team aimed for a "photo-realistic" graphics style. The returning characters' designs involved slight alterations to their Devil May Cry 4 iterations to fit their personalities. However, while few of the ideas for Dante and Nero were scrapped, V underwent nearly twenty redesigns. The new designs were also inspired by Carol Christian Poell as well as Daniel Craig and Benedict Cumberbatch.

Capcom used an older incarnation of Nero, so he would be "at the top of his game in body and mind". Because the game's graphics are meant to be as realistic as possible, each character is modeled after an actor. The staff wanted to generate a major emotional scene when Vergil reappears in the climax confronting his brother. As a result, Nero stops the brothers' feud and awakens his demonic powers to face his father. Itsuno said that Dante has a more mature personality and still wishes to protect humanity and honor the legacy of his father, Sparda.

== Protagonists ==
=== Dante ===
Dante, the series' primary protagonist, is a mercenary specializing in the paranormal and the main playable character in the first three Devil May Cry games. He is one of the twin sons of Sparda, a demon knight who sided with humanity and drove back an invasion of the human world by demons about 2,000 years before the series' events. The character was voiced by Drew Coombs in the original Devil May Cry and Matthew Kaminsky in Devil May Cry 2. Reuben Langdon voiced Dante in all subsequent appearances. Dante's Japanese voice is provided by Toshiyuki Morikawa. In the Netflix series, Dante is voiced by Johnny Yong Bosch.

=== Nero ===
Nero was introduced in Devil May Cry 4. An orphan adopted by the Sparda-worshipping Order of the Sword, Nero grew up to become a Holy Knight of the Order. He does not get along well with others and prefers to work alone, so he is usually given the Order's "special assignments". He is the son of Vergil, which also makes him the nephew of Dante and the grandson of Sparda. The character is voiced by Johnny Yong Bosch in English, and by Kaito Ishikawa in Japanese. Nero returns as one of the primary protagonists in Devil May Cry 5.

=== Trish ===
Trish is a demon created by Mundus who strangely resembles Dante's mother, Eva. She has enhanced strength and agility, accelerated healing and the ability to use lightning. As a playable character in Devil May Cry 4: Special Edition she also fights using unarmed strikes, pistols and the sword Force Edge. In English, Trish is voiced by Sarah Lafleur in Devil May Cry, and Viewtiful Joe: Red Hot Rumble, Danielle Burgio in Devil May Cry 4 and Marvel vs. Capcom 3/Ultimate Marvel vs. Capcom 3, Wendee Lee in Devil May Cry 5, and Luci Christian in The Animated Series. In Japanese, she is voiced by Atsuko Tanaka.

=== Lady ===
Lady is a freelance demon hunter. A human, she is skilled in acrobatics and armed close quarters combat. Lady has black hair, eyes of different colors and a signature weapon, the Kalina-Ann (a customized missile launcher, similar to a real-life MANPADS weapon that has a grappling hook launcher and a bayonet attached to it.) When fighting, she also uses a CZ75 pistol with a compensator and a VZ61 submachine gun equipped with a bayonet. She was named Mary by her father, Arkham, but she renounced the name when he murdered her mother in a ritual to obtain demonic power, an act which drove Mary to psychosis and obsessive vengeance. Lady first appears in Devil May Cry 3, and when she refuses to identify herself to Dante; he replies, "Whatever, lady!" Lady formalizes her name in the game's denouement when she shoots Arkham, telling him that "Mary" is dead. Although she is not a villain, her role in Devil May Cry 3 is that of an antagonist, as she seeks to deter Dante and even fights him twice before finally coming to terms with him. Lady also appears as a playable character in the Special Edition re-release of Devil May Cry 4, added alongside Trish and Vergil. In the Netflix series, Lady is voiced by Scout Taylor-Compton.

=== Lucia ===
Lucia, along with Dante, is one of the two protagonists in Devil May Cry 2. An agile fighter, she uses two ornately carved curved daggers. Like Dante, she can use the Devil Trigger, transforming into a bird-like demon of light called a "harpy." Character designer Daigo Ikeno stated that the team aimed for a contrast between Lucia and Trish, making them look as though they were from different races. Lucia is a member of Protectorate, a clan of guardians in the Vie de Marli with the blood of devils. She invites Dante to her island so her mother, Matier, can ask him to help them defeat Arius. Dante accepts, and he and Lucia begin their quests. It is later revealed that Lucia is an artificial demon created by Arius designated Chi that he abandoned as defective. Horrified by the revalation, Lucia fears she will harm those she swore to protect. After Dante defeats Arius, she starts crying and then begs the devil hunter to kill her, only for Dante to refuse, telling her that her tears are proof of her humanity before departing into the Underworld to confront Argosax. Arius then resurrects as a demon and attacks Lucia. With her fears assuaged she defeats him, and awaits Dante's return. She reappears in Devil May Cry 5 Before the Nightmare where she recruits Dante´s aid in battle against Argosax's right hand Balrog, and is revealed to have romantic feelings towards Dante. Lucia is voiced by Françoise Gralewski. In the Netflix series, Lucia is voiced by Salli Saffioti.

=== V ===
V is one of the protagonists of Devil May Cry 5, a mysterious figure who hires Dante to come with him to Red Grave City to subdue Urizen. He is ultimately revealed to be the personification of the discarded humanity of Vergil seeking to merge back with Urizen to their original form. In battle, V uses three demon familiars created from trace memories of Nelo Angelo to weaken his opponents so he can land the deathblow. Following Vergil's restoration, the familiars gain free will and become fully independent beings; the hawk-like Griffon convinces the panther-like Shadow and the golem Nightmare to attack Dante and all three die fighting him. V is motion captured by Owen Hamze and voiced by Brian Hanford in English, and is voiced by Kōki Uchiyama in the Japanese version.

== Antagonists ==
=== Vergil ===
Vergil is the series' main antagonist and Dante's older identical twin brother, who embraces his demonic side and is obsessed with gaining power. He is one of the primary antagonists in Devil May Cry 3 and a playable character in the game's special edition, ending up as Mundus's servant Nelo Angelo in the first Devil May Cry game. While appearing in Devil May Cry 4 and playable in its special edition to hint at his relation to Nero, fragments of Nelo Angelo's form were used as the basis for the Angelo-type demons developed by Agnus for Sanctus's use. Vergil returns in Devil May Cry 5 where he is revealed to be Nero's father while stealing the Yamato back for his use. Later, Dante's and Vergil's rivalry is a friendly one. Vergil also appears as a playable character in the crossover fighting game, Ultimate Marvel vs. Capcom 3. In English, Vergil is voiced by Daniel Southworth while Nelo Angelo is voiced by David Kelley in Devil May Cry and Robbie Daymond voices both Vergil and Nelo Angelo in the Netflix series. In Japanese, he is voiced by Hiroaki Hirata.

=== Mundus ===
Mundus is the Emperor of the Underworld and the overarching antagonist of the series, starting with his role as the main antagonist of the original Devil May Cry. He is portrayed as a semi-amorphous creature with three orb-like eyes who takes the form of a white-skinned seraph with a third eye on his forehead and a scar on his chest. Millennia ago, Mundus led the demons under his command in a long and brutal war with humanity, until he was betrayed and defeated by the strongest of his knights, Sparda, who sealed his powers and imprisoned him in his own realm. After Sparda's death due to the loss of his immortality, Mundus took revenge by sending his minions to murder Dante's mother, Eva, and seemingly killing his brother Vergil as well. In the aftermath of Devil May Cry 3, Mundus captured Vergil when he challenged him and turned the young man into the first of the Angelo demons. As the primary antagonist in Devil May Cry, Mundus is shown to have spent centuries posing as a statue on the foreboding Mallet Island, steadily corrupting the inhabitants and using his powers to remake the island in his own image. He then crafts a demon named Trish, making her look identical to Eva, and sending her to hire Dante to kill him so he can be destroyed. Mundus carefully monitored Dante's progress throughout the island, watching as he defeated his servants one by one and even stepping in to personally murder his servant Griffon when he begs Mundus for more power. Finally, when even Trish proved unable to stop Dante, Mundus tried to strike him down with his magic, but Trish took the attack instead, leaving her close to death. Dante's anger transformed him into the form of his father Sparda, and he defeated Mundus in personal combat. Despite this, Mundus crossed over, and tried to crush Dante with his decomposing body. Trish then combined her own magic with Dante's weapons, allowing him to seal Mundus' powers once again. Before he was banished back to his realm, Mundus vowed to one day take his revenge on Dante and conquer all of the human world.

A statue of Mundus can be seen briefly in Devil May Cry 2. He is also referenced in Devil May Cry 5 as having eaten the fruit of the Qliphoth to become ruler of the Underworld. In Dante's storyline in the PlayStation 2 version of Viewtiful Joe, he possesses Captain Blue to take revenge on Dante and Trish. Mundus also appears in the second Devil May Cry novel in a parallel universe, where he is confronted by Dante and Nelo Angelo's forces. An alternate version of Mundus appears as the main antagonist of DmC: Devil May Cry, this time portrayed as a powerful demon in human form who secretly rules over humanity. In the Netflix series, Mundus is voiced by Ray Chase.

=== Arius ===
Arius, the primary antagonist in Devil May Cry 2, is an insane, wealthy businessman who owns an international company, Uroboros. He wants to find the legendary Arcana, artifacts which would allow him to raise Argosax from the demonic realm and use his power to control the world. Human at the beginning of the game, Arius has access to powerful magic (which enables him to fight demon hunters like Dante) and can create his own demons. Near the end of the game, in Lucia's scenario, Arius survives his battle with Dante. Infused with the power of Argosax, he attacks Lucia, initially as a demonic version of himself. As he begins to lose, he mutates into a giant, lizard-like creature with a gaping mouth that spews poison.

In the Netflix series, Arius von Enhrenberg was once a brilliant, but mocked inventor, until he gained immortality and sorcery after discovering one of the Arcana. By making a deal with Argosax, he spends centuries gathering the remaining relics, involving manipulating the United States government by being the founder and true shadow leader of the anti-demon organization Dark Realm Command through his company the Uroboros Corporation, with the goal of reviving the former demon king, overthrowing Mundus and rule both the human and demon realms. Arius is voiced by Graham McTavish.

=== Argosax the Chaos ===
Argosax the Chaos was a cruel demonic deity who once rivaled Mundus and was the final antagonist of Devil May Cry 2. While Mundus's defeat allowed him to take control of the Underworld, Argosax was imprisoned in the void of the Underworld by Sparda when the rebellious knight came to the aide of the clan of Dumary Island. Using the Arcanas—sacred relics used to exorcise Argosax centuries prior—Arius intended to absorb the demon's power to achieve apotheosis. Instead, as Dante had switched the Medaglia coin with his own, the ritual was incomplete and caused Arius to become possessed upon dying.

Despite its faulty execution, the ritual was enough to create a portal to the devil's prison—enough to enable Argosax to escape if given time. Seeking to put an end to this scheme, Dante elects to enter the gateway and face the demon deity like his father before him. When he first appears, his native form—the Despair Embodied, a fiery horned hermaphrodite with angelic wings—is gestating inside of a chrysalis composed of the reanimated corpses of assorted bosses from games 1 and 2. He's capable of channeling their power while in this form.

Emerging from the destroyed mass after a lengthy battle, the Despair Embodied challenges Dante. It is able to use energy and projectile attacks with its wings as well as teleport and shapeshift its arms into swords in its male form, and whips in its female form, as its main weapons. Dante fights the Despair Embodied and then kills it with a lightning-infused bullet from his pistol, Ivory. After the battle, Dante remains trapped in the demon world as the portal he used to enter has accidentally closed. In the novel Before the Nightmare Dante claims that Argosax left so little an impression that he forgot Argosax's name. In the Netflix series, Argosax is voiced by Andrew Morgado.

=== Arkham ===
Arkham (アーカム, Ākamu) is the secondary antagonist in Devil May Cry 3, which takes place before the events of the first Devil May Cry game, and the estranged father of Lady. In the game, he is a scholar in the fields of demonology and the supernatural who sought to break the seal Sparda made to prevent Temen-ni-gru tower from serving as a Hell Gate. Arkham also desired to become a demon. A failed attempt by sacrificing his wife Kalina Ann resulted in the left side of his face being scarred but gave him some power. Arkham tricks Vergil into helping him while assuming the guise of the lunatic Jester (ジェスター, Jesutā) to lead Dante through Temen-ni-gru. He plays the brothers against each other along with exploiting Lady's attempts to avenge her mother, to bring about all the conditions necessary to unseal Temen-ni-gru. Arkham then travels through the completed gate to retrieve the Force Edge, combining its power with the restored halves of Eva's amulet to absorb Sparda's power. Though he becomes a demon resembling Sparda, Arkham's body is unable to compensate for the power as he mutates into an amorphous abomination that Dante and Vergil defeat together. Arkham is reverted to his original state as he ends up back in the human world where Lady kills him.

The character, in his normal and Jester forms, is voiced and motion-captured by Adam D Clark. Arkham's name was intended to be Hyne (pronounced "Hai-neh"), but Reuben Langdon (who voices Dante) thought it would be inappropriate in English and convinced Capcom to change it. Jester's name was intended to be "Joker". One of the key themes of Devil May Cry 3 is familial conflict. Itsuno said he did not like the idea of Lady killing Arkham, as he believed a child should never kill their parent. Morihashi wanted this scene in the final product, along with Dante defeating Vergil, as themes of the game. To balance this, Morihashi wrote a scene leading up to Arkham's death, where Lady said that Arkham was her responsibility. In the Netflix series, both Arkham and Jester are voiced by Ray Chase.

=== Sanctus ===
Sanctus is the primary antagonist in Devil May Cry 4. The proclaimed Vicar of Sparda and general of the Holy Knights, he is regarded as one of the greatest spiritual leaders of the Order of the Sword. Sanctus was apparently killed by Dante at the beginning of the game, but actually survived as he had himself infused with demonic essence in an ascension ceremony; occasionally appearing as a floating figure obscured by a suit of glowing plate armor. Sanctus originally planned to use Dante to give life to the Savior, a colossus in Sparda's image which housed collected demon essence. Later, he decides to use Nero as a part of the Savior after his close ally, Agnus, revealed the truth of the Order's actions to Nero. Sanctus takes matters into his own hands by having Agnus kidnap Kyrie to let the Savior absorb her so it can assimilate Nero. Sanctus then uses the Yamato to open the artificial Hellgates before merging into Savior to commence his plan to wipe out all demons and rule the world. Dante manages to sabotage Sanctus's scheme before freeing Nero and enabling him to rescue Kyrie, while defeating a mental construct of Sanctus. Ultimately, Nero completely destroys him by using the Devil Bringer to crush the Savior. The character is voiced by Liam O'Brien in English with O'Brien also performing the motion capture for Sanctus, and Ikuya Sawaki in the Japanese version of Devil May Cry 4: Special Edition. Yoshikawa designed him to become intimidating across the storyline.

=== Agnus ===
Agnus is the Order of Sparda's chief technology researcher and alchemist in Devil May Cry 4, developing demon-killing weapons for the Knights. An introverted workaholic with a habit of stuttering when stressed, Agnus rarely appears outside his office and very few in the cult know about him. It is later learned that he has been experimenting with the broken Yamato and created demon-based weapons like the Angelos, even turning himself into the insect-like Agnus Angelo before being killed by Dante when he attempts to stop him from reclaiming the Yamato. He is indirectly mentioned with contempt by his surviving daughter Nico in Devil May Cry 5. The character is voiced by T. J. Storm in English, and Yūya Uchida in Japanese version of Devil May Cry 4: Special Edition.

=== Urizen ===
Urizen, the primary antagonist in Devil May Cry 5, is the demonic half of Vergil that came into being when Vergil used the Yamato to purge his humanity to become a full Demon. Urizen proceeds to plant a Qliphoth Tree in Red Grave City so he can acquire its fruit to become the undisputed ruler of the Underworld, only to be defeated by Dante and absorbed by his other half V. Urizen is voiced by Daniel Southworth in the English version and Shunsuke Sakuya in the Japanese version. Urizen was meant to remind players of Mundus, the original Demon King from the 2001 Devil May Cry game. Itsuno said, "Urizen is definitely the strongest enemy of the entire Devil May Cry saga ... the most powerful. You've seen it: every time he appears, he sits on his throne and, maybe sometimes, he moves a little, but that's it. We want to make people understand how a fight against him can be completely crazy."

=== White Rabbit ===
The White Rabbit is an antagonist in the Devil May Cry 3 tie-in manga, later reimagined as the main antagonist of the Netflix series. Originally a demon possessing the White Rabbit Doll of a girl named Alice, and covertly hired Dante to rescue her in order to lure him and Vergil and watch them in action, only to be killed by Vergil.

In the Netflix series, the White Rabbit was originally a human orphan, with a love for Lewis Carroll's book Alice in Wonderland, who accidentally was transported to the demon world, where he was adopted by lesser demons attempting to survive, growing up and devising a way to use some minor portals to take lesser demons as refugees to the human world. When humans massacred the refugees and left him barely alive, he started using demon blood to gain powers, then becoming a terrorist who wears a rabbit mask and a black suit. His goal is to destroy the barrier that Sparda created to separate the worlds of demons and humans and he comes into conflict with Dante. The White Rabbit is voiced by Hoon Lee.

=== William Baines ===
William Baines is an antagonist in Netflix’s Devil May Cry animated series, serving as the corrupt Vice President of the United States and leader of the anti-demon organization Dark Realm Command, where his fanatical, religiously driven desire to wage a "holy war" against the demon realm leads him to manipulate others and pursue genocidal policies under the guise of protecting humanity. However, he completely fails to realize he is merely a pawn being used and manipulated by Arius. Baines is voiced by Kevin Conroy in the first season, with Ian James Corlett providing additional dialogue in episodes 3 & 8 and all of the second season.

== Supporting characters ==
=== Sparda ===
Sparda is the demonic knight who rebelled for humanity's sake 2,000 years before the events of Vergil's Devil May Cry 4: Special Edition. He defeated many demons and their emperor, Mundus, before sealing the gateway between the demonic and human worlds. Sparda's heroism made him legendary in the human world, and he is known as "the Legendary Dark Knight".

In Devil May Cry and its successors, Sparda left his power in his sword (known as the Force Edge or the Sparda) in the demonic realm. To seal the gateway between the worlds Sparda sacrificed his blood and that of a mortal priestess, using two complementary amulets as a key which he brought into the human world. To work, the amulets must be joined. Near the end of his life Sparda took a human wife (Eva) and fathered twin sons (Dante and Vergil). He gave the amulets to Eva, who passed them on to their sons. Sparda also gave his sons enchanted swords with opposing powers: Dante's broadsword Rebellion that allows the user to absorb anything, and Vergil's katana Yamato that can split one's being or open a link to the Demon World. It is unknown how Sparda died, and Dante believed that there was a lot of confusion surrounding his father and his legacy.

=== Eva ===
Eva is Sparda's human wife and the mother of Dante and Vergil, giving her sons each half of Sparda's amulet as a birthday gift. Eva was murdered in her home in Red Grave City by demons sent by Mundus. She safely hid Dante away, but was killed while she was looking for Vergil. Mundus later created Trish with Eva's appearance in a failed attempt to lure Dante to his death. In English, Eva is voiced by Wendee Lee in Devil May Cry 5 and Kari Wahlgren in the Netflix series. In Japanese, she is voiced by Atsuko Tanaka in Devil May Cry 5 and Mamiko Noto in the Netflix series.

=== Kalina Ann ===
Kalina Ann is the mother of Lady, and wife of Arkham. She was killed by her own husband to perform a ritual and obtain demonic power, which drove their daughter obsessed with revenge. Lady's signature missile launcher is named after her. Though only mentioned in Devil May Cry 3, she appeared in flashbacks in the Netflix series, where she was voiced by Erica Lindbeck.

=== Patty Lowell ===
First appearing in The Animated Series, Patty is a young girl, descended from powerful sorcerer Alan Lowell, who imprisoned the demon known as Abigail. After Dante protects her from some demons, she lives with him at Devil May Cry until Abigail is destroyed, after which she is reunited with her birth mother. Patty makes a voice-only cameo appearance in Devil May Cry 5, repeatedly attempting to invite Dante to her 18th birthday party. In English, Patty is voiced by Hilary Haag in The Animated Series and Haviland Stillwell in Devil May Cry 5. In Japanese, she is voiced by Misato Fukuen in the anime and Yū Shimamura in Devil May Cry 5.

=== J.D. Morrison ===
First appearing in The Animated Series, Morrison is Dante's closest friend and broker. He finds Dante jobs, acts as a handyman to keep Devil May Cry functioning, and offers him advice on how to be a better person. Morrison returns in Devil May Cry 5, having been heavily redesigned from his previous appearance. Following the game's events, Morrison becomes the new owner of the Devil May Cry office. In English, Morrison is voiced by Rob Mungle in The Animated Series and Joey Camen in Devil May Cry 5. In Japanese, he is voiced by Akio Ōtsuka.

=== Matier ===
Matier, a supporting character in Devil May Cry 2, is an old woman and part of the Protectorate clan alongside her daughter Lucia. Centuries prior, she and her clan fought alongside Sparda to defeat Argosax. Matier is cheerful and optimistic, certain of Dante's eventual victory. She guides Lucia to reunite the Arcanas that sealed Argosax and guide Dante to their island to aid them against Arius and Argosax. Although it is first claimed that Matier is Lucia's mother, it is later revealed that Lucia was created by Arius, who dismissed her as defective and attempted to dispose of her only to be found by Matier raised her. The character is voiced by Flo DiRe.

=== Credo ===
Credo, captain of hundreds of Holy Knights, is a strict, just man who is admired for his prowess on the battlefield. Kyrie's older brother, he sees Nero as family, but finds him unreliable. He was designed with key motifs representing his job, which Yoshikawa found fun to create. He orders Nero to capture Dante for Sanctus' "assassination", but is part of Sanctus' plan to bring about the Order's "Savior". Credo tries to arrest Nero after he learns about the latter's demonic power, and transforms into a winged creature he believes is angelic. When Kyrie is kidnapped to be used by the Order for Sanctus's grand plan, Credo loses his faith in the Order for using his sister as a tool and tries to help Nero save her. He is mortally wounded by Sanctus while trying to save Nero from capture, and Nero is absorbed into the Savior. Dying, Credo asks Dante to save Nero and Kyrie as his body dissipates into light. He is voiced by TJ Rotolo in English, and Rikiya Koyama in the Japanese version of Devil May Cry 4: Special Edition. His devil form was meant to contrast Nero's and Dante's due to how he looks like a heroic person when he still looks like a demon.

=== Kyrie ===
Kyrie is a supporting character introduced in Devil May Cry 4. She was born and raised in Fortuna and works as a singer for the Order of the Sword. She is Credo's sister, and Nero's childhood friend and love interest. After being misled into thinking that Nero is evil, Kyrie was held hostage by Agnus under orders of Sanctus to lure Nero to the Savior. He arrives too late however, as she had already fused with the Savior. Her fusion causes Credo to defect from the Order after recognizing Santus' evil scheme. When Dante frees Nero from captivity in the Savior, Nero can free Kyrie as she begins her new life with him. She makes two off-screen cameos in Devil May Cry 5, the first when Nero lost the Devil Bringer and the second in renewing his resolve to end the animosity between Dante and Vergil. The character is voiced by Stephanie Sheh in the English versions and Saori Hayami in the Japanese versions, and motion-captured by Laura Napoli. Itsuno was responsible for most of Kyrie's elements. She was envisioned as an "ordinary, cute heroine" who had a big impact on Nero despite not being a fighter. Her role was to motivate Nero and the player as the story progresses.

=== Nicoletta "Nico" Goldstein ===
Nicoletta Goldstein, nicknamed Nico, is a weapons designer introduced in Devil May Cry 5 who acts as Nero's tech support. She is the daughter of Agnus, whom she speaks of with great disdain, and the granddaughter of Nell Goldstein, the gunsmith proprietor of ".45 Caliber Works" who made Dante's signature handguns, "Ebony & Ivory". She considers her weapons works of art, having developed Nero's Devil Breaker prosthetic arms. Nico is motion-captured and voiced by Faye Kingslee in English, and is voiced by Lynn in Japanese. Nico was created to be a contrasting heroine to Nero's girlfriend, Kyrie; Nico is more used to fighting.

=== Enzo Ferino ===
Enzo Ferino is an Italian American associate of Dante, formally an information broker who would double as a middleman and set him up with clients and jobs during his mercenary days. In the Devil May Cry Drama CD Enzo is revealed to be a source of debt for Dante who sends frequent payments to Enzo out of guilt for amputating his arm when it was fused to a demon gun, with the various Devil Arms collected across the series being kept by Enzo as collateral. In the Netflix series, Enzo is known to be an information broker that works with numerous hired guns and demon hunters, including Dante. Although, he and Dante have been working together for three years. He is voiced by Yasunori Matsumoto in the Devil May Cry Drama CD and Chris Coppola in the Netflix series.

=== Alice ===
Alice is a supporting character in the Devil May Cry 3 tie-in manga. She is a young human girl who is manipulated by demonic forces like the White Rabbit to use dark magic to appear older and lure the Sons of Sparda out of hiding. Although she briefly fights Dante under the influence of the dark magic, she isn’t a true antagonist acting on her own malice.

=== Nell Goldstein ===
Nell Goldstein is a major supporting character in Devil May Cry Volume 1. Nell is a gunsmith renowned as the ".45 Caliber Virtuoso" with connections to the mercenary underworld, meeting Dante while working as a mercenary under the alias Tony Redgrave and acting as a mother figure towards Tony. Dante frequents her shop ".45 Art Warks [sic]" as his abilities break any gun he uses. She is killed by Gilver to force Tony to relive the trauma of Eva's death and reveal his true identity as Dante, but is able to complete work on Dante's signature guns "Ebony and Ivory" and force him to assemble the pistols himself before she dies. Her son Rock Goldstein is the step-father of Nico Goldstein, with Nico considering Nell to be her grandmother. In the Netflix series, she is voiced by Tara Strong.

=== Tom Remington Jr. ===
Tom Remington Jr. is a supporting character in the Netflix series, Devil May Cry. He is a bravado-filled, former college football quarterback and Heisman Trophy winner who serves as an elite operative for DARKCOM (Dark Realm Command). Tasked with hunting down demonic entities alongside his squad, his overconfident ego is quickly checked when he is soundly defeated by Vergil. After finding out the horrific truth behind DARKCOM's operations and the apocalyptic master plan orchestrated by Arius, Tom defects from the military organization and teams up with Lady to take down his former handlers. Tom is voiced by John Omohundro.

=== Lucan ===
Lucan is a supporting character in the Netflix series, Devil May Cry. He is an aging professor who has learned to wield demonic powers and the grandfather of Mattie. As an old friend and former client of Dante and Enzo Ferino, he possesses deep knowledge of Dante’s demonic heritage and his father, Sparda. He becomes fully aware of the corporate sorcerer Arius's master plan to breach the Underworld and awaken the demonic king Argosax. Lucan is voiced by Keith David.

=== Mattie ===
Matilda, better known as Mattie, is a supporting character in the Netflix series, Devil May Cry. She is the spunky, stylish, and orphaned granddaughter of Lucan. Orphaned after her parents were killed, she forms a deep emotional bond with Mary Ann Arkham (Lady), who helps Mattie process her grief and vengeance by mirroring her own tragic past. Following her grandfather's death, Mattie is captured by Arius but is ultimately rescued and taken to New York by Dante’s older brother, Vergil, who uses her situation to challenge her to seek absolute power rather than remain a victim. Mattie is voiced by Paris Johnson.

== Demons ==
=== Agni & Rudra ===
Agni & Rudra are two demon brothers taking the shape of two scimitars, who were sealed by Sparda in Temen-ni-gru and act as guardians within the Firestorm Chamber. The swords confront Dante animating two headless golems, and manifesting their respective powers over fire and wind. Upon their defeat, the swords request to be taken as weapons by Dante, who agrees on the condition they be quiet. In the continuity of the Netflix series, Agni & Rudra are two demons, resembling the golems used by their video game counterparts, with command over fire and wind, acting as enforcers of the White Rabbit. Agni & Rudra are voiced by Larry Leong in Devil May Cry 3 and by Ray Chase in the Netflix series.

=== Arachne ===
Arachne are a type of demons born from the souls of human women transformed into monsters as they entered into the Netherworld. As they become spider-like in nature, they still keep some vague humanoid features. They roamed the dark and damp lower levels of the Temen-Ni-Gru tower, protected from their natural weaknesses, heat and fire.

=== Artemis ===
Artemis is a demonic sentient gun created by the infamous gunsmith Machiavelli, that ended up being obtained by Dante during his mission at the Temen-Ni-Gru. Trish attempted to use it to battle Urizen along with Lady, but upon their defeat, Urizen allowed Artemis to use Lady as a host to grow a full demonic body. In this form, Artemis aids Urizen to gather blood to feed the Qliphoth Tree, until attempting to defeat Nero in Red Grave City. Nero was able to overpower her and cut her in half, freeing Lady from the demonic body. Artemis is voiced by Elizabeth Hales in Devil May Cry 5.

=== Bael & Dagon ===
Bael and Dagon are two large toad-like demons with control over ice, that were able to lead a demon infestation on the Fortuna Castle due to an artificial Hell Gate opened within it. Their sudden appearance caused the castle to be engulfed in a neverending blizzard, until Nero eventually found Bael at the castle's courtyard. Bael lured Nero through the rusalkas that, like the anglerfish, had at the top of his illicium, designed to entice human prey, but he was able to rip off one of its Rusalkas, and kill Bael, who warned of the arrival of his brother. Dagon emerged from the gate and froze the castle, and used his rusalkas to lure Dante, being almost able to devour him. Dante dodged it, surprising Dagon and angering him with one of his usual taunts, eventually killing him and shattering his ice form. Bael & Dagon are voiced by Kyle Hebert in Devil May Cry 4.

=== Baul & Modeus ===
Baul and Modeus are supporting antagonists of the anime series, Devil May Cry: The Animated Series. They are the two apprentices of The Dark Knight Sparda. They are entrusted with the strength of Sparda, prior to his revolt in the Demon World. Baul is voiced by Andrew Love and Modeus is voiced by Jay Hickman.

=== Beelzebub ===
Beelzebub is a type of insectoid demons swarming Mallet Island, created when demons possessed flies and similar insects on the Human World. They are able to vomit maggots that disable Dante's firearms until removed. They tend to live within the waterways beneath the castle, waiting to ambush Dante.

=== Berial ===
Berial is leonid centaur demon from Fire Hell, who was able to travel to the Human World in Fortuna, ambushing Nero at the mining camp of the Ferrum Hills, but retreating to the demonic realm due to his defeat. Once the True Hellgate was opened, he was able to return to the Human World, where he witnessed the arrival of the Savior and commented on Sanctus' arrogance. Having sneaked unnoticed and sitting on his tail, Dante agreed with his comment, and as Berial recognized him as the Son of Sparda, eagerly claims to be about to avenge all demons previously slain by Dante. Being defeted in battle, he attempts to destroy Dante in a kamikaze attack, only to die trying. Berial is voiced by Larry Leong in Devil May Cry 4.

=== Beowulf ===
Beowulf is a chimera demon acting as one of the many guardians of the Temen-ni-gru, who had a special grudge against Sparda not only for sealing him, but for blinding one of his eyes during the process. Dwelling across the Temen-ni-gru Tower's Torture Chamber, he became unforgiving towards Sparda and his entire bloodline, he identified Sparda's son by their scent, and first came across Dante, who fought him but spared his life, though he fully blinded Beowulf in the process. Once coming across Vergil, he immediately attacked, but realized his mistake of underestimating him once Vergil killed him by cutting his head into pieces. Beowulf is voiced by Larry Leong in Devil May Cry 3. In the Netflix series, Beowulf is voiced by Tony Todd and James C. Mathis III.

=== Blade ===
Blades are large demons created by Mundus to attack the Human World. One of the many demons deployed on Mallet Island to confront Dante, they resemble large lizards with claws on their left hands, a round shield on their right forearm, and head armor. They often attack their prey in packs, being able to follow them relentlessly and attack them on land and underwater.

=== Cavaliere ===
Cavaliere Angelo is an artificial demon designed to be an upgrade of the original Nelo Angelo, and thus given wings, two ridged horns, a metallic armor, a giant sword, and an elder Geryon as steed. As the first attempts to create Cavaliere failed, Trish was captured and used as the core of the new demon, thus creating a functional and powerful demon. Cavaliere first came across V, showing his disdain to both humans and descendants of Sparda, and as V and his familiars were able to defeat him and kill his Geryon, Cavaliere retreated from battle. Cavaliere later ambushed Dante, who was his primary target under Urizen's orders, throwing a motorbike to him like Trish did during their first encounter, so Dante was able to recognize his friend inside the demon, and proceeded to kill him and liberate Trish from within Cavaliere. Cavaliere is voiced by Jamison Boaz in Devil May Cry 5 and by Jason Marnocha in the Netflix series.

=== Cerberus ===
Cerberus is a three-headed hellhound and the first gatekeeper of Temen-ni-gru. He sealed the entrance of the tower with his powers over ice, and once Dante approached to enter the tower, he first demanded that he left, attacking only when Dante mocked him. Despite being a demon, he was honorable, and willingly relinquished his soul to Dante due to his superior power. The progenitor and most powerful of all Cerberuses was the guardian of the fruits of the Qilpoth Tree, tasked by Urizen to both guard it and use his freezing powers to control the heat in the tree's blood vessels and stimulate its growth. However, this King Cerberus was also defeated by a now-adult Dante. Cerberus is voiced by Larry Leong in Devil May Cry 3.

=== Chi ===
Chi is an antagonist of the Netflix series, Devil May Cry. She is an artificial demon created, along with many clones, by the corrupt businessman Arius von Enhenberg as his right-hand woman and the commander of the Secretaries. Due to her demon physiology, Chi and her "sisters" are capable of transforming into a harpy-like demon. She is voiced by Ingrid Hunnigan.

=== Doppelganger ===
Doppelganger is a shadow demon living at the Temen-ni-gru, who is able to mimic its foes' shape due to light refraction. Being the final Gatekeeper of Temen-ni-gru, he resided past the Dark-pact Chamber of the Tower, where he confronted Dante using his own fighting moves, until his defeat, with Dante absorbing him to develop a demonic ability to create copies of himself.

=== Echidna ===
Echidna is a demoness whose body resembles a giant plant serpent, with a female human-looking torso within what would be the serpent's mouth. Echidna was the ruler of the great forest of the Demon World, but accessed the human world and took over the Mitis Forest, propagating more demons with her eggs. She ambushed Nero when he was crossing the forest, but he was able to escape, battling her at her den and defeating her, but she managed to escape. She was later found by Dante while she was lying her eggs, who started to destroy them. Echidna angrily attacked and attempted to devour him, but she ended up being killed with a bullet from Dante's handguns. Echidna was voiced by Mary Elizabeth McGlynn in Devil May Cry 4 and by Kari Wahlgren in the Netflix series.

=== Fetish ===
The Fetish is a class of demons possessing inhuman artificial bodies created by other devil entities, in a manner similar but more powerful to the Marionettes, and they were deployed by Mundus' armies on Mallet Island in order to stop and kill Dante. Their bodies, sharing their extremely long limbs and weapons with the Marionettes, presented a bird-like beak and a glowing, cage-like chest, erasing any resemblance to humans that the others may possess.

=== Frost ===
Frosts are demons created by Mundus to attack the Human World. One of the many demons deployed on Mallet Island to confront Dante, they resemble large lizards, like the Blades, but are covered with icy armor and have the power of controlling ice at will, which grants them regenerative powers and makes their claws function like swords that are capable of freezing upon contact.

=== Geryon ===
Geryon is a demonic horse capable of manipulating time, sealed within the Underground Arena of the Temen-ni-gru. Originally a horse ridden by legendary heroes, he was transformed into a demon due to the ingestion of demonic essence, which turned his mane and tail into blue flames. Despite his ability to travel back and forth through portals, he was defeated by Dante to access the latest part of the tower.

=== Gigapede ===
Gigapedes are tapeworm-like demons who were able to enter the human world through a rift from the Demon world. One of them travelled across tunnels in the walls of the Temen-ni-gru, ambushing Dante at the Giantwalker Chamber, who managed to kill it. Shortly after, two gigapedes ended up within Leviathan, where Dante also battled and killed them.

=== Gilgamesh ===
Gilgamesh is a huge insectoid demon created by the roots of the Qliphoth Tree encased in the demonic metal that was used to create the Gilgamesh weapon obtained by Dante years before in Fortuna. This demon wandered the tree attacking everyone on sight with lightning blasts from his tendrils. V came across him and tried to avoid him, lacking the strength to face Gilgamesh, but Gilgamesh pursued him. Nero located Gilgamesh and resorted to destroy him, due to the danger he posed, and with some help from V, managed to do so, retrieving a piece of the metal to create a new weapon for himself.

=== Goliath ===
Goliath is a large, strong and arrogant demon with the ambition of becoming the ruler of the Underworld by using the Qliphoth Tree. Besides his brute strength, his main source of power lies in his stomach covered with yellow eyes and big jaws, who uses to devour large objects and turn them into fireballs. He came across Nero during the demonic invasion of Red Grave City, and losing his temper due to Nero's taunts, ended up being defeated. In a weakened state, but still determined to move along with his plan, V and his familiars attack and kill Goliath, leaving behind one of his horns to be later retrieved by Nero. Goliath is voiced by Joey Camen in Devil May Cry 5.

=== Griffon ===
Griffon is a demonic servant of Mundus, often considered the eldest and most loyal, with the appearance of a large bird and power to control wind and lightning. He battled Dante three times across Mallet Island, who swiftly defeated him. Begging for his master's mercy, Griffon was killed by Mundus, as he was no longer a worthy servant. Griffon is voiced by Howard Jerome in the original Devil May Cry.

=== Kyklops ===
Kyklops are lesser demons who manifested on Mallet Island, as part of Mundus' armies to invade the Human World, creating arachnid bodies of earth and rock, which gave exceptional durability to their bodies.

=== Leviathan ===
Leviathan is a demonic biological weapon created by Mundus in ancient times, that resembled a massive floating whale. Leviathan was sealed by Sparda along with the Temen-ni-gru tower, and roamed around it once it was unleashed on the human world. Leviathan swallowed Dante following his defeat at Vergil's hands at the top of the tower, though he was able to survive the ordeal, navigating across its insides towards its heart, and destroying to kill the creature and escape from inside through his eye.

=== Malphas ===
Malphas is a large featherless bird sorceress demon with a female humanoid body of three women melded together on her back. Malphas is loyal to Urizen, dispatching orders to ensure his plan is successful. Malphas ordered Cavaliere Angelo to destroy the Devil Sword Sparda to prevent Sparda's descendants to use the blade against Urizen, and later ambushed V to steal his familiars and trap him in a pocket dimension. She attempted to attack V when he managed to escape due to his weakened state, only to be interrupted by Nero whom she threatens before engaging in battle, only to be defeated and killed by him. Malphas is voiced by Becky Boxer in Devil May Cry 5.

=== Marionette ===
Marionettes are bodyless low-class demons serving Emperor Mundus. They have possessed the puppets created to resemble the former inhabitants of the castle in Mallet Island, and confront Dante with that physical form. Within these bodies, they are able to conjure weapons, but they are easily destroyed with physical means.

=== Nevan ===
Nevan is a demonic Leanan sídhe with control over lightning, and one of the gatekeepers of the Temen-ni-gru, who used to seduce and lure humans to Hell before being sealed by Sparda. She built an opera house within a limestone cavern inside the Temen-ni-gru tower, to serve as her chambers, and it was there where Dante found her. At first attempting to seduce him, Nevan then firely battled him, only to be defeated like the rest of the gatekeepers. Nevan was voiced by Mary Elizabeth McGlynn in Devil May Cry 3

=== Nidhogg ===
Nidhogg is a demonic parasite attached to the Qliphoth Tree to feed on the life force gathered by the tree. Through this, he developed his body, from an orange humanoid faceless torso, into three large snake-like roots with razor teeths in the mouth. Nidhogg is an aggressive yet unintelligent demon, and in attempt to attack V and his familiars, and while the familiars realized that Nidhogg was not a threat due to his inability to survive outside the roots, V nevertheless attacked and killed him effortlessly.

=== Nightmare ===
Nightmare is a demonic bio-weapon created by Mundus on Mallet Island, who attacked Dante during his mission to stop the Demon Emperor. Once unleashed, it had the appearance of a grey slug-like hull, covered in runes, and with many structures unleashing energy to its enemies.

=== Nobody ===
Nobodies are a low-class but powerful type of demons, deemed unworthy of a name due to their limited intelligence. Besides their strength, they are able to deplete the magical powers of their opponents, and to increase their size in combat in order to damage their enemies, with the use of a magical mask.

=== Phantom ===
Phantom is an arachnid demon and one of the highest-ranking generals on Mundus' armies, whose body is composed of molten magma covered in a durable shell. He developed a special animadversion towards Dante due to his continuous taunts during their confrontations at Mallet Island, and when impaled after their last fight, Phantom confused him with Sparda, reacting in disbelief to the apparent appearance of the Legendary Knight. Phantom is voiced by Howard Jerome in the original Devil May Cry.

=== Plasma ===
Plasma are a type of electrical shapeshifting demons who often assume the shape of bats, though they tend to transform into the shapes of their opponents, and copy their attacks against them. Due to their ability to embody electricity, they are immune to lightning and energy attacks. When encountered on Mallet Island, Plasmas assumed the form of Dante to battle him on sight. In the continuity of the Netflix series, Plasma is reimagined as a recurring major demon and one of the White Rabbit's agents, maintaining his shapeshifting and control over electricity traits. In the Netflix series, Plasma is voiced by Roger L. Jackson.

=== Sargasso ===
Sargasso are low class demons shapedn as floating skulls, who pray on stray wanderers, hiding between the edges of the seas in the Human world and the Netherworld. They are to freeze solid their prey with their laugh, in order to feast on their victims and leave their spirits to wander the seas of the Underworld. Dante encountered them on Mallet Island, and while powerful to easily kill humans, they stood no chance against the demon hunter.

=== Shadow ===
Shadow is a shapeshifting feline demon who take the form of his own shadow, while being bound by protective magical spells. Due to their experience fighting human knights, Shadows are able to withstand being attacked with bladed weapons, but as the Demon World was sealed for a millennium, they have not adapted to modern weaponry and thus are easily harmed by firearms. Shadows were part of Mundus' armies while attempting to conquer the Human World from Mallet Island, but unlike other demons, they were not aggrssive until provoked by Dante during his mission to stop Mundus.

=== Sid ===
Sid is the main antagonist of the anime series, Devil May Cry: The Animated Series. He is A weak demon who first appears in episode one. Sid turns out to be a major antagonist who manipulates Dante and collects valuable demonic items. His ultimate goal is to harness the power of Abigail, a demon who once fought against Mundus, to rule human and demon worlds. He is voiced by Christopher Ayres.

=== Sin ===
The Sins are a family of lesser demons that can only manifest in the human world by maintaining their power and form within a mask they wear, and cannot exist without them. They manifest a illusory whole body in the shape of a black cape that is impervious to damage, and carry a deadly large weapon to try to kill their enemies, usually a pair of rusted scissors or a large scythe to slice their enemies.

=== Trismagia ===
Trismagia is an ancient, three-faced demonic boss in Devil May Cry 2. It is a floating entity that separates into red (anger), black (joy), and white (sadness) heads, each wielding elemental powers (fire, electricity, ice) to fight Dante or Lucia. In the Netflix series, Trismagia acts as a manipulative mastermind linked to the imprisoned former king of Hell, Argosax the Chaos. Unlike its purely elemental combat role in the games, it shifts its focus toward psychological warfare and illusions, subjecting victims to profound mental torment and forcing them to confront dark, twisted reflections of themselves. In the Netflix series, Trismagia is voiced by Rick D. Wasserman.

== Promotion and reception ==
In addition to the games, anime and manga, Devil May Cry characters have appeared in merchandise including novels, comic books, a skin variety on the PlayStation Portable, a special edition of the PlayStation 3 console and several soundtracks. Capcom has made other merchandise available including concept art for The Animated Series, T-shirts, rings, collars and handbags. The series' popularity led to a line of action figures produced by Toycom; Kaiyodo produced a similar line for Devil May Cry 2 and a Devil May Cry Dante action figure. Kotobukiya produced statues (including Vergil and Dante) based on the characters after the release of The Animated Series and Devil May Cry 4, and other merchandise includes posters and framed stamps for the series' 10th anniversary.

When Devil May Cry was released Dante's personality was praised, with IGN describing the character as a "maverick head-hunter", "believable" and "awesome". His confident, fearless attitude has made him popular; the character ranked seventh on GameCrush's Top 10: Most Badass Video Game Characters list and third on ScrewAttack's Top Ten Coolest Video Game Characters list. The original game's demonic enemies were "ferocious", the sub-bosses "incredibly tough" and the bosses (particularly Vergil) "very tough", providing many of the game's challenges. Eurogamer called the demons "some of the most bizarre-looking creatures you will find this side of American McGee's Alice" and the bosses "vast", with their battles requiring a variety of strategies (although the fight with Nightmare was considered repetitive). Because Dante and Vergil are half demon and half human, they were noted as bringing in religious overtones to the games, although this was initially subtle. Ninja Theory made a more direct reference to the way religion is portrayed in gaming while showing the parallels between the identical twins. On the other hand, the cast from the first Devil May Cry were felt to be underdeveloped.

In its review of Devil May Cry 2, GameSpot said that the characters lacked personality (based on the removal of Dante's distinctive traits). It also felt that Lucia's role was too small, not allowing the character time to develop. The website called the game's enemies "mindless", noting that most characters (including the bosses) could be defeated with the default attacks. Dante's younger persona in Devil May Cry 3 and the relationships he goes through in the narrative were also given a major focus by reviewers and found to be superior to Kamiya's original take. The missions where the player controls Vergil in Devil May Cry 3: Special Edition added "an all-new and unique play style". Being able to play his story arc was "such a blast that Capcom could probably have released his modes separately for $19.99 and gotten away with it" according to one reviewer.

The characters in Devil May Cry 4 were said to resemble a "legion of seraphim the likes of which gamers have never seen before, and it puts an interesting spin on what all of our preconceptions of 'good' are in a video game". 1UP.com noted that the enemies shared visual elements with the military personnel of actual religions: "Considering the visual nature of the heavily-armored, winged, angelic warriors scattered around the various missions, it'd be easy to confuse these characters with crusaders of Christian origin." Dante's dynamic with Nero in the following game garnered positive responses as critics found none of them overshadowed the other even if Dante's fans had to wait for the game's second half to control him while enjoying the older characterization.

Devil May Cry 5's narrative was well received due to the handling of the characters and their connections. Despite liking Dante's relationship with Nero to the point of comparing them like father and son, USGamer found Dante's treatment of the younger demon hunter mean-spirited even though the character later reveals he does not want Nero to face Vergil because of their connection. Several critics focused on the increased number of moves available to the three protagonists. The Daily Telegraph praised the characters' mechanics, most notably V's for how differently he plays in contrast to Nero and Dante while still remaining entertaining. While IGN felt Dante was similar to his presentation in previous games, they noted the new weapons he presents were much more enjoyable. VideoGamer.com was more critical of the plot, believing the narrative, and villain were "dull" despite some interesting interactions in the storyline.
