= Ifrit (disambiguation) =

Ifrit is a supernatural creature in Arabic and Islamic cultures.

Ifrit may also refer to:

- Ifrit (bird), another name for the blue-capped ifrit
- Ifrit (Final Fantasy), a recurring character from the Final Fantasy video game series
- Ifrit (Sonic the Hedgehog), a character in the video game Sonic Rivals 2
- Ifrit, a pair of demonic fiery gauntlets used by Dante in the video game Devil May Cry.
