= Devil May Cry (disambiguation) =

Devil May Cry is a Japanese video game franchise created by Hideki Kamiya.

Devil May Cry may also refer to:

- Devil May Cry (video game), a 2001 video game and the first in the franchise
- Devil May Cry: The Animated Series, a 2007 anime adaptation
- DMC: Devil May Cry, a 2013 video game and a reboot of the franchise
- "Devil May Cry", a 2013 song by the Weeknd, from the soundtrack to The Hunger Games: Catching Fire
- Devil May Cry (novels), a series of novels based on the franchise
- Devil May Cry (TV series), a 2025 animated adaption
