= Yuichiro Hiraki =

Video game designer

- 平木雄一郎
- Occupation: Video game designer
- Years active: 1994–present
- Employer: Capcom; SNK

Yuichiro Hiraki (平木雄一郎) is a game designer involved with SNK and Capcom works.

== Biography ==
As a child Hiraki liked playing with clay which would influence his work as modeling and motion. He also considers himself a fan of fighting games most notably Virtua Fighter which impressed him due to its handling of 3D models. When joining SNK, Hiraki worked in The King of Fighters '94 most notably on its lead Kyo Kusanagi. Hiraki sought to contrast Kyo with Street Fighter lead Ryu, as he believed the latter was a popular character in international markets and that Kyo's characterization and design could benefit from appealing to as broad a demographic as possible. He was inspired by Joe Yabuki from Ashita no Joe as he believes hotblooded characters like Joe would work in Kyo. For the next game, The King of Fighters '95, Hiraki created Kyo's rival Iori Yagami. Since Kyo hot-blooded in some ways, the development team just assumed Iori would be the opposite, cool and blue-blooded. Kyo's pixel art was created by Hiraki, who, despite leaving SNK to work on another project a few years later, was asked by Capcom's Kaname Fujioka to once again work on Kyo's design for the crossover game Capcom vs. SNK: Millennium Fight 2000.

When joining Capcom, Hiraki worked on Dino Crisis 2 and designed its Velociraptor. He also worked in Devil May Cry in the motion capture involving Dante, his characterization and fighting style upon hearing director Hideki Kamiya's concept. Hiraki felt Dante looked like a "nihilistic anti-hero with a bit of a dark side", based on his early concept art by character designer Makoto Tsuchibayashi. As a result, he wrote him as a character who would rely on his demonic powers, Devil Trigger during the game. The combination between Dante's swordsmanship and usage of guns with unlimited ammo made the character feel more unique according to Hiraki before the concept of Devil May Cry was conceived. More acrobatic skills were decided by Kamiya in the making of the game including double jumps despite the initial concept of the game as well as flying when Dante used Devil Trigger. This generated difficulties in the designers from the game.

Hiraki also worked in the creation of the Sengoku Basara series and personally behind its lead Date Masamune. After Sengoku Basara, Hiraki was asked by producer Hiroyuki Kobayashi into helping into the development of Devil May Cry 4, doing motion capture for its new protagonist, Nero. Hiraki was one of the ones who came up with ideas for Nero's character based on notes from Kobayashi as the staff wanted the new game to feel more innovative. Hiraki wanted Nero to be a violent character as reflected on the way he handles swordsmanship. Hiraki consulted with director Hideaki Itsuno on other traits suitable for the new protagonist. Like in the first Devil May Cry, Hiraki worked with the two motion actors. Hiraki also suggested giving heroine Kyrie a dark side but his idea was rejected. Hiraki also worked in Ninja Theory's reboot of Devil May Cry: DmC: Devil May Cry as planner. Still, he found his days at Devil May Cry 4 more enjoyable more entertaining for him, comparing them to the mecha anime Mobile Suit Gundam. His next major work at Capcom was Street Fighter V where did the motion capture for Ryu's movements, something he found challenging such as his Shinshoryuken move. Other works Hiraki worked in were the horror games Resident Evil 0 and the 2002 remake of the first Resident Evil game. He also took part in developing Marvel vs. Capcom: Infinite, Lost Planet and Devil May Cry 5.
