= Devil May Cry (novels) =

Light novel series

Capcom developed two light novels in the Devil May Cry series, written by Shinya Goikeda, illustrated by Shiro Miwa and published by Kadokawa Shoten. Originally released alongside Devil May Cry and Devil May Cry 2 the novels act as preludes, with the epilogue of the novel leading into the opening scene of the game. In 2006, Tokyopop released English language editions of the novels, translated by Paul Cheng and Gemma Collinge and adapted into English by Ethan Russell.

== Devil May Cry Volume 1 ==
Devil May Cry Volume 1 ISBN 978-1598164503 Pages: 206

Devil May Cry Volume 1 spans from the death of Dante's mother Eva until the beginning of the first Devil May Cry video game, though evidence suggests that the story may also take place before Devil May Cry 3 as well. Series creator Hideki Kamiya was able to work closely with Goikeda during the development of the novel, stating that his depiction of Dante and Goikeda's depiction are very similar.

=== Plot ===
The novel begins with Dante, under the alias Tony Redgrave, confronted by the thug "Mad Dog" Denvers for the ninety-ninth time. Dante kills all of Denvers' men and leaves. As Denvers reminisces about how Dante's appearance two years previously caused the fall of the local underworld, he is killed by scythe-wielding devils screaming Dante's name.

In Bobby's Cellar, a mercenary hideout, Dante talks with his partner Grue. He then leaves Bobby's Cellar, heading to Goldstein's Shop, run by gunsmith Nell Goldstein. Bantering with Nell, Dante mentions he wrecks guns quickly due to the rate of fire he employs. Returning to Bobby's Cellar, Dante acquires a lucrative job with Grue. During the job it becomes clear to Dante and Grue that it is too dangerous, so they retreat. Later, as both men evaluate the aftermath of the pitched battle, they are attacked by the corpses. Dante destroys them, though Grue freezes. Afterwards, Grue and Dante eat dinner with Grue's family.

At Bobby's Cellar Enzo introduces a new mercenary named Gilver, a tall man swathed in bandages who wields a katana. Gilver fights Dante, proving himself equal. Deciding to settle the fight with drinking, Dante wins and Gilver is robbed by the bar patrons. After leaving, Dante is beset by demons and an undead Denvers. Dante awakens in the home of a local woman, who he spurns before leaving. He learns that killing Denvers has led to a bounty being placed on his head by the Oz Club. He leaves to confront the club directly.Entering a bank, he fights the same demons once again. Defeating them he runs into Gilver, who has slaughtered the Oz Club.

Weeks later, Dante and Gilver are now being paired on numerous jobs and Grue is missing. On the way to work, Dante stops by Nell's home, giving him two handguns and warning him about Gilver. Dante runs into Grue, who has been taking assassination jobs. After leaving Dante, Grue kills a heavily in debt thug. This sparks a demonic transformation among the thug's friends and Grue's hiding place is revealed by Gilver. Grue ignites a grenade on his chest, trying to kill Gilver. Dante and Gilver continue as partners, and Enzo reveals that Grue did assassinations because of his daughter Jessica's illness. Dante goes to the hospital and finds it overrun by demons. Dante faces the demon in charge, who is feeding on Jessica's despair. He kills the demon and Jessica, shattering the connection between the human world and demon realm.

Due to the hospital massacre and Grue's disappearance, Dante is publicly scorned by other mercenaries. Gilver converts the patrons of Bobby's Cellar into demons while Dante goes to Nell Goldstein's for rest. Soon after he leaves, an explosion engulfs Goldstein's Shop in flames. Dante charges in, finding Nell working on two handguns made especially for him: Ebony and Ivory. Giving him the handguns, Nell then dies. Dante ceases using the Tony Redgrave alias. Dante returns to Bobby's Cellar and confronts Gilver. Amidst a furious sword fight, Gilver shoots Dante with the shotgun purchased at Nell's shop. Fatally shooting Gilver in turn, Dante is horrified to discover that Gilver is his brother Vergil.

Much later, Enzo drops by Bobby's Cellar and helps Dante leave. In the novel's epilogue, Dante sits in his shop as Devil May Cry begins.

== Devil May Cry Volume 2 ==
Devil May Cry Volume 2 covers the period after the first Devil May Cry video game until the events of Devil May Cry 2. This release features a different art style than Devil May Cry Volume 1, with the artist utilizing shading and ink washes in addition to black and white. The translators of the novel deliberately chose not to translate the Beastheads' name into Cerberus due to the appearance of the Cerberus in Devil May Cry 3: Dante's Awakening, despite the obvious resemblance. Likewise, they maintained Vergil's alias as Nelo Angelo despite feeling that Nero Angelo (lit. Black Angel) was more correct.

=== Plot ===
The novel begins as a redheaded woman, Beryl, storms through a temple. As a priest tells her that no evil is within the temple, they are attacked. Warned by a scar, Beryl expends her anti-tank gun on her foe before it flees. Dante and Enzo talk about work in Dante's shop, Devil May Cry. As they discuss Dante's work habits and Trish's non-presence, Dante gets a call for work. As Enzo drops Dante off near the temple, Dante races towards the evil he feels and discovers humanoid demons, who he fights. Enzo finds Beryl on the road and agrees to take her back up the mountain. Beryl catches up with Dante as he finishes his foes, and she nearly hits him with her weapon by accident. Beryl then explains the Beastheads, a demonic statue which she has chased for years.

A youth named Ducas is awakened by a demon crashing through his roof. In the demon's hands is the Beastheads statue, which Ducas takes. Chen, the boss of organized crime in the area, quickly arrives. Chen dismisses Ducas and instead focuses on the dead demon and discovers that Ducas has the statue. Meanwhile, Dante broods about the Beastheads. Beryl locates Dante's office, having tracked down the Beastheads to Ducas. Beryl persuades Dante to help her investigate.

Ducas' good luck continues and he is learning to control the Beastheads, allowing him to see the future and sees Dante killing him. Moments later, Dante and Beryl crash through the window as Ducas hides. After they leave, Ducas escapes by sprouting feathered wings, which Beryl and Dante notice. Ducas lands on a building, encountering Chen. Chen offers Ducas safety, sending his demonic minions to stop Dante. Dante dispatches the foes with ease, though Beryl finds herself overwhelmed. As Dante and Beryl decide to confront Chen, Ducas finds himself alone on a yacht. He places the Beastheads in his mouth and chews it to pieces to consume its power.

The Beastheads, now an enormous three-headed dog, tracks Dante and Beryl to a sea-side cliff. The despair the Beastheads causes nearly incapacitates Beryl. Seeing Dante fight reminds Beryl of the Dark Knight, Sparda, a fairy tale she was told as a child. She gets up and aids Dante, though defeating the Beastheads causes them to warp somewhere. Beryl dreams, remembering how the Beastheads corrupted her father. She awakens in a cave with Dante. Dante investigates and discovers they are in a parallel world where Mundus captured him as a child and his brother Vergil led Mundus' lieutenants against him. Dante agrees to fight Mundus a second time. The village housing the rebel demons is attacked by an army, all of whom resemble Trish. Mundus' former lieutenants give their lives to aid Dante in killing Trish, an action he regrets. Griffon leads Dante to Mundus' castle. Dante and Beryl enter and Dante defeats Mundus a second time while Beryl watches.

Beryl and Dante awaken in Chen's labs, where Chen performs experiments on demons. The building vibrates as Chen acquires the Beastheads' power. They attack Chen, killing his minions and causing him to flee. Dante and Beryl follow and are caught in Chen's trap. Chen discovers that the Beastheads consumes human souls but replenishes demonic power. Dante carves his way out of the trap while Chen devours the Beastheads statue.

Chen and Dante clash, both using the Sparda's sword-style. Chen gains the upper hand until Dante hurls his sword through Chen's head. Beryl uses her gun to punch through Chen's defense, allowing Dante to destroy the Beastheads. The book ends months later with a white-hilted dagger flying through Dante's front window, bearing an invitation to the museum seen in the beginning of Devil May Cry 2.

== Devil May Cry 4: Deadly Fortune ==
Devil May Cry 4: Deadly Fortune is a two-volume adaptation of the fourth video game in the series, Devil May Cry 4. It was written by the game's writer, Bingo Morihashi, with assistance from Yasui Kentarou. The two novels were published by Capcom during 2009. In the afterword, Bingo wrote that these removed scenes were intended to be included in the game, but were not due to some production reasons.

The novel adapts the story of Devil May Cry 4 that focuses on a young holy knight named Nero who works for the Order of the Sword. Nero is given the job of capturing Dante after he seemingly kills Sanctus, the leader of the Order of the Sword. The novel expands the story from Devil May Cry 4 such as Nero's background. It is revealed he was found as, a baby, alone in Fortuna and was adopted by the parents of Credo and Kyrie. Having decided to follow Credo's footsteps, Nero joined the Order of the Sword but he was not accepted due to his use of guns, something which the hunters did not allow. During Nero's quest he meets an unknown man in a dream when he receives the sword Yamato. Dante also takes an interest in Nero's origins after finding that he is very similar to his twin brother, Vergil. As in the game, Nero discovers that Sanctus and his soldiers have become demons and plan to use the power from Dante's father, Sparda, to open the gates from the Demon World and gain people's faith by saving them from the demons. After Nero and Dante ally to defeat Sanctus, the former starts his own demon hunting business in Fortuna after the Order of the Sword is disbanded.

== Devil May Cry 5 Before the Nightmare ==
Devil May Cry 5 -Before the Nightmare- (角川スニーカー文庫) is a prequel novel that takes places before Devil May Cry 5 and leads up to beginning of the game. It was written by the game's writer, Bingo Morihashi. The novel was released on March 1, 2019 in Japan, days before Devil May Cry 5 was released.

Taking place five years after Devil May Cry 4, Nero and Kyrie are living together in the ruins of Fortuna when the former is approached by weapon artist Nico Goldstien. While initially wary of her rude demeanor and her heritage as both the daughter of the Order of the Sword's scientist Angus, and the granddaughter of the gunsmith whose firearms Dante possesses, Nero gradually warms up to her. As the trust between them grew, Nico offers her services to refurbish Nero's van so he can make money as a traveling demon hunter. Not long after however, Nero encounters a dying demon who rips off his Devil Bringer arm with Nero losing consciousness.

Meanwhile, Dante returns to Vie de Marli after ten years and helps Lucia defend the island against a fire-imbued demon named Balrog, who utilized a fragment of Vergil's sword Yamato to enter the human world. After Dante manages to defeat Balrog using the ice-imbued Cerberus Devil Arm, the demon recognizes him as Sparda's son and the one who defeated his master Argosax. He then offers himself as a new Devil Arm to replace the shattered Cerberus, until he can become strong enough to challenge Dante to a rematch.

A few days later while visiting Grue's surviving daughters Tiki and Nesty, J.D. Morrison encounters a man known as "V" who requests him to take him to the Devil May Cry office so he may hire Dante, Lady, and Trish in suppressing a certain demon who gives the demon hunter a reason to fight. While Dante learns the identity of the demon, Lady is visited by Morrison as a television broadcast regarding the appearance of the demonic Qliphoth tree in Red Grave City airs, leading Lady to realize Dante is somehow connected to the city. Dante's group soon arrive at the Qliphoth tree in response to their quarry Urizen awakening ahead of schedule, with V enlisting Nero who leaves Fortuna in secret to not concern Kyrie and Nico.

Shortly after as Dante's group begin their mission, Trish reflects on how Mundus kept tabs on Dante and Vergil since Eva's death. Knowing of their survival, Mundus then created both her and the Angelos to succeed in killing them where the demons in his employ failed. Thanks to her knowledge of various demons, Trish attempts to figure out who Urizen is before she and Lady are knocked out by the Demon King before Dante arrives. Dante engages in a friendly banter with Urizen before assuming Devil Trigger mode to fight him, as V and Nero arrive. But Urizen proves too much for the group as Dante holds him off so V can get Nero to safety, V telling Nero they have a month to prevent the end of the world. V chooses to remain in Red Grave City to collect intel and save as many as he can from the Qliphoth's blood-sucking roots, expressing some guilt of his former self. Nero meanwhile returns to Fortuna where he learns Nico is building his Devil Breaker prosthetic while insisting to accompany him for maintenance and to meet Dante.
