= GameCrush =

American video game and social network service

- Type: Private
- Industry: video games, social network service
- Founded: 2007
- Headquarters: San Francisco, California, USA
- Revenue: Not disclosed
- Website: http://www.gamecrush.com

GameCrush was a website where gamers meet, match and play a variety of video games including console, flash-based casual, and PC based. GameCrush members (the site focuses on female players, due to their relative scarcity in console online gaming) can post profiles with pictures, videos, and gaming information and interact with other members through text chat, video chat, and private messages. The site launched publicly on September 28, 2010, the same day it presented as a finalist at San Francisco's TechCrunch Disrupt.

== Design ==
GameCrush differentiated itself from other social gaming sites by offering credits, which could be used to buy and give gifts that held real-world value. While messaging and requesting a game were free, it was considered a nice gesture to offer a gift when requesting a game from someone new (as co-founder Eric Strasser put it, "much like buying a drink for someone in a bar"). Members could also earn badges and achievements, and could be rated, or even blocked, by other members based on their behavior.

== History ==
Shortly after first launching their beta in March 2010, the GameCrush site went down. According to statements made by its management, it was overloaded with more connections than it could handle due to the high demand. It is reported that management said they were "overwhelmed with interest, and have smoking servers to prove it." It was claimed that the site received over 10,000 queries in five minutes of operation, overloading their servers and crashing their network. On June 5, 2010, GameCrush returned as a private, invitation-only beta.

BusinessWeek wrote an article describing GameCrush as "part social network, part online dating site, and a lot of Grand Theft Auto." The same article revealed the founders to be Eric Strasser, David Good, and Anees Iqbal. Strasser revealed that the site had more than 5,000 women and 1,000 men participating in its private beta.

In August 2010, TechCrunch's Michael Arrington revealed that GameCrush had raised $700,000 in an angel round featuring Scott Banister and his wife Cyan, among other angels and VCs. The public launch was loosely scheduled a month out from the article, September 2010.

On September 28, 2010, GameCrush launched its public site and presented as one of the six finalist companies at TechCrunch Disrupt.

In early 2011, GameCrush launched a free, random game matching engine called the "Crush-O-Matic." TechCrunch described the service as one that mined a vein similar to the video experience of Chatroulette but with cofounder Eric Strasser stating that "the site's registration requirement, user profiles and a user rating system help prevent" the rampant nudity found on that site.

After experimenting with various compensation models for the PlayDates, the site shut down in early 2013. In its place was a promotion for an upcoming site called "Buckme" that appears to have never launched.

== Reception ==
The Boston Phoenix's "Laser Orgy" online column, written by Maddy Myers, said "I'm as mystified by this service as I am by similar services offered by girls (or guys -- but usually girls) who sit around talking to people on their webcams." she also commented "There's something inherently sexual about GameCrush, yes -- but that's mostly due to the over-sexualizing of women in both American society and particularly in gamer culture..." and "So, GameCrush, I give you props for your stupid idea. I am dubious about how successful it'll be, though, when the percentage of female gamers climbs every day."

IGNs "Xbox Live" online column, written by Daemon Hatfield, said "I can imagine some guys might be disappointed if they paid to play with a girl, only to hear her go on and on about her boyfriend..." and "Perhaps the most surprising thing about GameCrush is that no one else thought of it sooner. I have no doubt there are many gamers out there who would be willing to pay a little cash to play and flirt with hot girls, the only question is whether or not GameCrush is offering the right features for the right price."

VentureBeat's "GamesBeat" online column, written by Dean Takahashi, said "But a hot girl who can beat you at a game of Halo is probably a close to an ideal date for a lot of gamer dudes. At least that's my guess."

Cnet's online column "Crave", written by Matt Hickey, said: "Still, the idea could work if gaming girls--I'm sorry, PlayDates--can get around the slightly creepy idea of selling themselves for the attention of boys. Like Alicia, I'm a little skeeved out by the whole thing."

PC World's online column "Today@PCWorld", written by Sarah Jacobsson, said: "Isn't it great to know that playing video games and chatting with hot girls aren't mutually exclusive activities any more (assuming you have the cash to spend)?"

Tom's Guide, article written by Kevin Parrish, mentioned that concerns about the "Play Dates" were raised by reporters with the site's PR firm. "It was noted that their extracurricular activities were not directly connected to the dating service, however it's unavoidable to turn a blind eye to their other 'hobbies.' As an example, JadeRox works elsewhere online as an amateur pornographer, and even has a website that shows off her naked, feminine qualities. Needless to say, she's not sporting any manly luggage. She's even selling her used panties." He concluded "Maybe lonely gamers should put down the gamepad and head to a local club with friends."

Fast Company, article written by Dan Nosowitz, said "Here's how pathetic GameCrush is: it modeled its service after the behavior of a desperate man trying to get a girl's attention at a bar by buying her an eight-dollar drink. But in reality, it's more of a gamer's phone sex line, dressed in Ed Hardy."

The Escapist, article written by Greg Tito, notes that during the testing period: "Internet comedians have already created false profiles such as Gabe Newell, a bear and a grill. Get it? A gamer grill! Genius!"

XboxIC, article written by Jason Andrews, warned that use of GameCrush might violate Microsoft's Terms of Service (ToS) for Xbox Live, and that Microsoft logs all Xbox Live sessions. "If you don't want the Xbox LIVE Enforcement team to laugh at your penis as they bring down the banhammer, or to have to call Customer Support because the woman who sent you dirty texts stole your Xbox LIVE account - then think wisely!" Andrews wrote. The ToS states that users may not, among other things: "use the Service for commercial purposes", "use the Service in a way that harms us or our advertisers, affiliates, resellers, distributors, or vendors, or any customer of ours or our advertisers, affiliates, resellers, distributors, or vendors", or "Publish, distribute, or disseminate any inappropriate, profane, defamatory, infringing, obscene, indecent, or unlawful content, topic, name, material, file, or information". Andrews also notes that GameCrush's rate is almost $40 per hour.

Crush! Frag! Destroy!, article written by Rob Rich, said, "I will say that I'm pretty put-off by this whole thing. Especially the fact that IGN seems to condone it. But maybe I'm just being an alarmist. I suppose it was bound to happen sooner or later, right?"

Games Abyss, article written by Brad Hilderbrand, said, "The website is set up like the world's loneliest singles lobby, allowing players to pick their game as well as whether they want their pretend date to be "flirty," "dirty," or both. You then pay around $10 for a ten minute game and feel much worse about yourself afterwards."

The Huffington Post article written by Jessica Rovello, said "Let's not mistake what this is. It's not gaming, it's simply a new spin on the phone sex lines of the 80s. It's light porn with a twist. If it wasn't, you wouldn't need to be over 18 to join, you wouldn't be able to have uncensored "Dirty" talk over webcams and you wouldn't be able to tip your PlayDate real cash after your session. If there's anything revolutionary about GameCrush it's that it took this long for someone to come up with the idea of actually paying women to play core games like Modern Warfare 2. After all the hardcore game community has never valued women for anything more than their avatars. It shuts them out of their ranks on the corporate side, hyper-sexualizes them in games and then wonders why they have a hard time attracting more female players."

Writing in Binge Game, James Walker wrote: "Does it sound shady? Sure. Is it sleazy to pay women to chat with you over a game of Gears of War? To a degree, you bet. But if there is one thing that gamers know how to do, it's waste exorbenant [sic] amounts of money on pointless shit."
