= Reuben Langdon =

American stuntman & voice actor (born 1975)

- Born: Reuben Christopher Langdon; July 19, 1975 (age 51); Anchorage, Alaska, U.S.
- Occupations: Stuntman; voice actor
- Years active: 1996–present

Reuben Christopher Langdon (born July 19, 1975) is an American former stuntman and voice actor. He has provided the voice and motion capture for video game characters including Dante in the Devil May Cry series (starting from Devil May Cry 3: Dante's Awakening) and Ken Masters in the Street Fighter series (from Street Fighter IV up to Street Fighter V) and Super Smash Bros. Ultimate.

== Early life ==
Reuben Christopher Langdon was born in Anchorage, Alaska on July 19, 1975, and grew up in Georgia.

== Career ==
Langdon began acting in Japan in B-Fighter Kabuto. Some action scenes from the show were reused in the US show Beetleborgs Metallix. Langdon moved to Hong Kong, where he continued to work on films.

He had a cameo role in Power Rangers Time Force in 2001 and performed a number of stunts in Power Rangers: Lost Galaxy and Power Rangers: Lightspeed Rescue. However, after the Power Rangers franchise was acquired by Disney, all members of the original cast—including Langdon—were let go.Langdon has done stunts for television including CSI: Miami and Dexter. Besides these, he has done stunts in movies such as The Medallion, Spider-Man 2, Pirates of the Caribbean: At World's End, Night at the Museum 2, Ant-Man, Scott Pilgrim vs. the World and Avatar.

Langdon's sound performances are done mainly in Capcom video games. He first voiced Dante in Devil May Cry 3 and reprised the role in Devil May Cry 4, Devil May Cry 5 and Marvel vs. Capcom series (since Marvel vs. Capcom 3). Langdon dubbed characters in the English Devil May Cry anime series. In addition, he voiced Ken Masters, the narrator of Street Fighter IV and Street Fighter IV: The Ties That Bind.

For Devil May Cry 3, Devil May Cry 4 and Devil May Cry 5, Langdon also did the motion capture for certain scenes. During the development of Devil May Cry 3, Langdon found that doing the motion capture of Dante was difficult to the multiple moves the character makes. Langdon often discussed with the staff about Dante's characterization that was different from the original one as they wanted "a different spin." Eventually, Langdon decided to do his own rendition of Dante as he was confused with the staff's suggestions. In retrospective, Langdon finds Dante "the most difficult, frustrating and yet rewarding character" he has ever played and stated he grew attached with him. Langdon was told to make Devil May Cry 4's Dante similar to his Devil May Cry 3 persona albeit more mature. Despite the staff's concerns for the difficulties of such portrayal, Langdon had no issues after choosing Roy Focker from the anime series The Super Dimension Fortress Macross as his character model and noting he had almost the same age as Dante during production of the game. Langdon's performance as Dante in Devil May Cry 3 and Devil May Cry 4 received praise by GamesRadar for being the character's best voice actor noting that the two previous actors did not fit the character well.

Langdon has also done stunt work for the Uncharted series and The Last of Us (including stunt-work for its companion game Left Behind) where he played the character James, both games working opposite Nolan North. Through his work with the motion capture studio Just Cause Productions, he has been a part of the motion-capture process for many games developed around the world, such as the remakes of Resident Evil 2 and Resident Evil 3.

Langdon also stars in the music video for "Over 'Quartzer,'" the theme song for Kamen Rider Zi-O.

Langdon did not reprise his role as Ken in Street Fighter 6, claiming this was due to a Newsweek interview that painted him in a bad light.

During the announcement of the Devil May Cry Netflix series, it was revealed that fellow Devil May Cry actor Johnny Yong Bosch would be replacing Langdon as Dante. When asked why Langdon was not voicing the character, Bosch responded that in an Instagram reply that Langdon had quit acting.

== Personal life ==
While filming a documentary in Guatemala in February 2019, the car Langdon and Steve Copeland were in was shot at. The gunman then tried to break into the vehicle and opened fire again as the pair sped away. Reuben Langdon has been critical of the Black Lives Matter and the MeToo movements, saying that "it just creates more conflict and will never end because they will always be throwing people under the bus." Reuben Langdon has also used his social media account to express interest in COVID-19 and anti-vaccination conspiracy theories.

== Belief in Extraterrestrial Life ==
Langdon claims to have had his first UFO sighting in the late 2000s, which sparked his interest in ufology and the paranormal. He has since spent time researching extraterrestrials, and is the creator and host of the web show Interview With E.D. (Extra-Dimensionals). In 2013, he co-produced a five-day event called the Citizen Hearing on Disclosure at the National Press Club in Washington, D.C. The event brought together over 40 people, mostly ex-government and military, to testify in front of six former U.S. Congress members in a mock congressional hearing about the possibility of aliens interacting with humans. He has claimed that this event is the most comprehensive body of evidence and testimony delivered to the public on the subject of aliens.

== Filmography ==
=== Stunts ===
Stunts in film and television
Year	Series	Notes	Source
2006	Kamen Rider Dragon Knight	Pilot episode	
2007	Drive-Thru		
2007	Dexter	Stunt double for Michael C. Hall; 10 Episodes; Uncredited	
2009	The Butcher	Stunt double for Eric Roberts	

=== Acting ===
Acting performances in film and television
Year	Title	Role	Notes	Source
1996-1997	B-Fighter Kabuto	Mack Windy	Dubbed over by Koichi Tochika for the voice	
1998	Tetsuwan Tantei Robotack	Takado	The image in Misaki's imagination	
2003	The Medallion	Henchman	Credited as Reuben Christopher Langdon	
2008	Ninja Cheerleaders	Sailor	Uncredited	
2011	The Green Hornet	Crackhead		
2012	Wreck-It Ralph	Ken Masters (voice)	Cameo	
2012–13	Kickin' It	Zeke's Man, Mailman		
2015	Ant-Man	Lab Guard		
2017	Sleepless	Passenger		

=== Animation ===
English dubbing performances in animated series
Year	Anime	Role	Notes	Source
2008	Devil May Cry: The Animated Series	Dante	Credited as Justin Cause	
2009	Street Fighter IV: The Ties That Bind	Ken Masters		
2010	Monster	Detective Zanda	Ep. "The Monster's Afterimage"	

=== Video games ===
Year	Videogame	Role	Notes	Source
1997	Gamera 2000	Soldier		
2003	Grand Chase	Azin		
2005	Devil May Cry 3: Dante's Awakening	Dante	Also motion capture	
2008	Devil May Cry 4	Dante	Also motion capture	
2008	Street Fighter IV	Ken Masters	English dub	
2008	Disaster: Day of Crisis	Steve Hewitt, Major Evans		
2008	Robert Ludlum's The Bourne Conspiracy		Motion capture for Jason Bourne	
2009	Resident Evil 5	Dave Johnson	Motion capture for Chris Redfield	
2010	Super Street Fighter IV	Ken Masters	English dub	
2010	Sengoku Basara: Samurai Heroes	Date Masamune	English dub	
2011	Marvel vs. Capcom 3: Fate of Two Worlds	Dante	English dub	
2011	Ultimate Marvel vs. Capcom 3	Dante	English dub	
2012	Street Fighter X Tekken	Ken Masters	English dub	
2013	The Last of Us	Unnamed soldier, James, clicker		
2013	Grand Theft Auto V	The Local Population		
2016	Street Fighter V	Ken Masters	English dub	
2017	Marvel vs. Capcom: Infinite	Dante		
2018	Super Smash Bros. Ultimate	Ken Masters	English dub	
2019	Resident Evil 2	Additional voices	English dub	
2019	Devil May Cry 5	Dante	English dub Also motion capture	
2019	Teppen	Dante	English dub	
2020	The Last of Us Part II	Mike		
2021	Shin Megami Tensei III: Nocturne HD Remaster	Dante	English dub	
