= Dante (Devil May Cry) =

Fictional character in the Devil May Cry series

- Devil May Cry character
- Dante's original Devil May Cry design as seen in Project x Zone
- First game: Devil May Cry (2001)
- Created by: Hideki Kamiya
- Designed by: Makoto Tsuchibayashi, Daigo Ikeno (Devil May Cry 2 and 3); Tatsuya Yoshikawa (Devil May Cry 4 and 5); Alessandro Taini (DmC: Devil May Cry)
- Voiced by: English: Drew Coombs (Devil May Cry, Viewtiful Joe series); Matthew Kaminsky (Devil May Cry 2); Reuben Langdon (Devil May Cry 3, 4, & 5, The Animated Series, Marvel vs. Capcom series, Teppen, Shin Megami Tensei III: Nocturne HD Remaster, Punishing: Gray Raven); Tim Phillipps (PlayStation All-Star Battle Royale, DmC: Devil May Cry); Vincent Tong (Puzzle Fighter); Jacob Browning (Peak of Combat); Johnny Yong Bosch (TV series); Japanese: Toshiyuki Morikawa
- Motion capture: Reuben Langdon (Devil May Cry 3, 4, & 5); Tim Phillipps (DmC: Devil May Cry)

In-universe information
- Species: Cambion
- Weapon: Rebellion (sword); Ebony and Ivory (pistols)
- Family: Sparda (father); Eva (mother); Vergil (twin brother)
- Relatives: Nero (nephew)

Dante (Japanese: ダンテ) is a character and the protagonist of Devil May Cry, an action-adventure game series by Japanese developer and publisher Capcom. Introduced as the protagonist of the 2001 game with the same name, Dante is a for-hire demon hunter who is known for his cocky and easy-going attitude. Alongside his twin brother Vergil, Dante is one of the two sons of the heroic demon Sparda, inheriting demonic powers which he uses with a variety of weapons in the games. The character also appears in several Devil May Cry novels and manga volumes and is featured in the 2007 anime television series. Dante has also made multiple guest appearances in crossover games. Since 2005, he has been portrayed in voice acting and motion capture by Reuben Langdon.

Named after the Italian poet Dante Alighieri, the character was designed to fit Devil May Cry game designer Hideki Kamiya's vision of a "cool and stylish" man; his personality was based on the title character of the Cobra manga series. Dante has been modified in response to criticism in his role in Devil May Cry 2 (2003) as his personality changed, making him more serious and less talkative, drifting away from his original persona. Devil May Cry 3 (2005) features a young, cocky Dante, and in the following games, an older yet still cocky Dante. Capcom handles the character in the main Devil May Cry series, while Ninja Theory oversaw his persona in DmC: Devil May Cry (2013).

Dante's characterization is that of a cocky demon hunter with supernatural abilities, which has earned him much recognizability within the gaming landscape. Reuben Langdon's portrayal of Dante has also been the subject of praise. Comparatively, his redesign and characterization in DmC: Devil May Cry was highly controversial for the drastic change of his appearance and attitude.

== Concept and influences ==
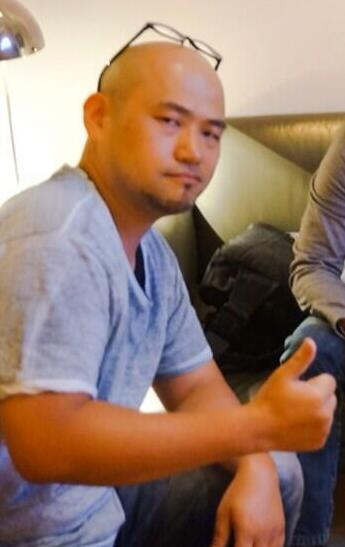
Game designer Hideki Kamiya created Dante while working in Resident Evil.

Dante debuted in Devil May Cry, a game originally intended as part of Capcom's Resident Evil franchise. Series creator Hideki Kamiya rewrote the story, taking it from Divine Comedy, written by Dante Alighieri. He was originally going to be a Western policeman. His early name, Tony Redgrave, served as a reference to one of the characters from Resident Evil, Chris Redfield. Other creators besides Kamiya is Yuichiro Hiraki who was famous for designing The King of Fighters like Kyo Kusanagi and Iori Yagami and his talent attracted Capcom when leaving the SNK company in the late 1990s. Hiraki worked in the motion capture involving Dante, his characterization and fighting style upon hearing Kamiya's concept.

Devil May Cry was designed from the ground up around Dante's acrobatics and combat abilities. Kamiya gave Tsuchibayashi freedom when designing Dante though there were concept arts Kamiya did not accept. Tsuchibayashi produced the 3D model based on other staff member's clothing and an unclear relationship between Dante and Trish. The Devil Trigger form gave him difficulties to the idea of giving him wings and altering his face, resulting in the artist performing to many sketches. An alternate outfit was developed featuring an older Dante though the designer never asked for specifics about. Nevertheless, he believes this design made Dante look more like Vergil. Tsuchibayashi says other sketches did not provide more difficulties as there was no need to match his personality.

Hideaki Itsuno said that for Devil May Cry 5, Dante was influenced by mecha anime he watched when he was young. Itsuno cited the character's conflict with his family but while showing powers that would reveal mechas. Itsuno views Dante's early defeat by Vergil's alterego Urizen and his awakening of new devil powers alongside his new sword Dante as one of the most important changes in his characterization in Devil May Cry 5.

=== Personality ===
Kamiya said that he saw Dante as "a character that you would want to go out drinking with", someone who was not a show-off but would "pull some ridiculous, mischievous joke" instead to endear people to him (and make the character familiar to audiences). When asked about the relationship between Dante and Trish, Kamiya said their bond was superior to love. Kamiya's keywords when describing the character were "composure" and "ambiance". Although Kamiya was not the main writer of the first two Devil May Cry novels, he saw Shinya Goikeda's depiction of Dante as similar to his own. In development, Dante was originally called Tony Redgrave, and did not carry a sword.

In Devil May Cry 2, his goofy attitude was replaced with a more serious brooding type of personality. The staff felt that Dante's stylishness remained true to the original character (despite his change in personality) because of his movements. Daigo Ikeno was responsible for Dante's appearance in Devil May Cry 2 and 3. In developing the former, he attempted to make Dante more handsome. In retrospect, Ikeno was disappointed with the character's inaction in the game. In the prequel game, Devil May Cry 3: Dante's Awakening, Dante was a younger, more arrogant character than in the previous instalments. The designers of Devil May Cry 2 returned to design his new look, which was based on the Japanese band Johnnys. This Dante showed more skin under his jacket which the staff believed would fit his younger persona. Trying to remain true to Kamiya's original idea, the staff worked carefully to make his actions and personality appealing. Bingo Morihashi said that Dante's characterisation was meant as a departure from Kamiya's style, and more of a team effort. According to Morihashi, despite seeing the character in three games, he had trouble understanding him. Although Dante is a strong character, he opens up to others. Fan response to this Dante led Morihashi to say that the team was inspired by the Devil May Cry Dante but needed to change him. Nevertheless, the character's role in facing the world affected the writer. Dante and his identical twin brother Vergil represents one of the themes of Devil May Cry 3—familial love. While initially Dante only wishes to have fun while fighting demons, he is moved by Lady's determination to stop her father. He decides to stop Lady's corrupted father as well as Vergil who wishes to open the gate to the demon world.

Devil May Cry 4 producer Hiroyuki Kobayashi noted before the game's release that they aimed to make Dante seem significantly more powerful than its other protagonist, Nero, to create a difference between the strength of a "veteran" compared with a "rookie"; the series' continuity also dictated that Dante display the power he possessed after the events of the first game and its prequel (Devil May Cry 3). The introduction of a new protagonist had been discussed multiple times but was only approved under the condition that Dante also had to be featured in the game. The staff were afraid of negative feedback similar to what had happened to Konami's 2001 game Metal Gear Solid 2: Sons of Liberty, which proved highly controversial because of switching protagonists. As a result, the team tried balancing Dante and Nero's strength. Due to the physical similarities between Dante and Nero, the staff aimed to make their designs unique and make their personalities stand out in their interactions with other characters. An example was the Devil May Cry 4 antagonist, Agnus. Nero remained at odds with Agnus in cutscenes, but Dante mocked Agnus in a musical taunt before the boss fight with him which signified how different the two playable characters were in terms of personality.

Itsuno initially found Dante's motivations in early games simple: "Beat this bad guy." With Devil May Cry 5, the goal was to imbue curiosity and drive. Matt Walker pointed to Dante's desire to see if Urizen was connected to his brother Vergil, giving further depth to his characterisation. The character's early defeat at the hands of Urizen coupled with the destruction of his sword Rebellion was meant to emphasise Dante's weak powers set by the narrative and how, across it, he would gain new skills to face the antagonist in a rematch. Furthermore, Dante and Nero would respect one and other as they became friends at the end of the previous game. The game's climactic event where Nero awakens his demonic powers and stops the struggle between Dante and Vergil was meant to give the story a deeper form. With regard to how Dante would play, Itsuno said he would be more like his Devil May Cry 3 persona. Nevertheless, he said that Dante is more mature from a personality standpoint since he still wishes to protect humanity and honour the legacy of his father, Sparda.

=== Designs ===
Dante's design changes in each game featuring from left to right his Devil May Cry 3 look, 1, 4, and 2.

According to Kamiya, the title character of Buichi Terasawa's Cobra manga series was the basis of Dante's personality. To give the character's "stylishness" he dressed him in a long coat to make him "showy" and made him a non-smoker; Kamiya saw that as "more cool". Dante wears red clothing—the traditional Japanese color for a heroic figure—in contrast to Leon S. Kennedy, a character Kamiya created for Resident Evil 2, who wears blue clothes.

After the success of the first Devil May Cry game, Capcom inserted Dante into a game already in development. This necessitated the maturing of his characterisation. Dante's change to a more-taciturn character was a decision made by a producer who disliked his previous incarnation. The staff aimed to make him look older—in his 30s—than his original self, implying that something dramatic had happened to change his personality. Dante and Lucia dressed in Diesel fashions appealed to the developers.

Dante's final design was left up to Kamiya, who discussed with Bingo Morihashi how the character should be portrayed. Kamiya felt that early depictions of Dante were too quiet and wanted a character who was more "wild" and wore different clothing (such as his sleeveless jacket). Dante appears bare-chested underneath his coat, something that surprised the audience. This design was meant to fit his young personality as well as contrast Vergil's fully clothed looked. Additionally, similar to Dante's longsword Rebellion (リベリオン, Riberion) and red clothing, Vergil was also made to wield a Japanese katana and wear blue clothing. Ikeno said he liked the character but had issues with it. Dante's Devil Trigger forms were designed by Kazuma Kaneko of Atlus. The Capcom staff was impressed with Kaneko's work, and Ikeno felt that it was not difficult to model. A wallpaper with Dante and Vergil's Devil Trigger forms was designed as a tribute to the Japanese show Super Sentai once defeating the game. Dante was designed to be easy to control, in contrast to Vergil who was more difficult but stronger.

Dante was designed in that game by Tatsuya Yoshikawa, who called the character in his original appearance "the ultimate Hollywood action superstar". Yoshikawa wanted to make Dante older in his 30s or 40s. His design included a stubble which reflected his "cool" personality since he did not care about shaving. For Devil May Cry 4, Dante's body was more suitable for fighting and his personality was more intense; Yoshikawa emphasised the character's sternness and naughtiness. Dante was given a variety of costumes, with one intended to indicate mystery. Several weapons in the series are character-specific. One is Pandora, a firearm designed by Kobayashi who noted that he wanted to include a "transforming, multi-purpose AWD in Dante's arsenal. Something that could be used as an over-the-shoulder rocket launcher, or a crossbow, etc. In its final form, I wanted it to transform into something that would be even bigger than Dante himself." The weapon was inspired by anime series such as Macross and Gundam. The staff felt that Dante received more missions and weapons than they had originally intended.

Dante and Nero's appearances were changed in the E3 2018 trailer for Devil May Cry 5, confusing fans who wondered if Nero was Dante. After seeing the older Dante at the trailer's end, Capcom noted that fans realised who was who and were pleased with the designs. While designing this incarnation of the character, a total of six outfits were produced until the final one was chosen. As a "weathered devil hunter", his leather rider's jacket had custom stitching tailored to fit his body, so it is easier to get around in. Like his Devil May Cry 4 design, Dante reflects the idea of a man who does not care about others' opinions of his look. Both his and Nero's designs were developed to fit their personalities. According to the company, Dante "hasn't gone wild for no reason".

=== Fighting style ===
Artist Yuichiro Hiraki felt Dante looked like a "nihilistic anti-hero with a bit of a dark side", based on his early concept art by character designer Makoto Tsuchibayashi. As a result, he wrote him as a character who would rely on his demonic powers, Devil Trigger (魔人化) during the game. Shortly after the game's development, Kamiya said that his personality would be more animated (which gave Hiraki the idea that Dante would be an "incorrigible joke-cracker") and the Devil Trigger was downplayed. Hiraki began drawing the character stylishly, working on Dante's gameplay, his swordsmanship Stinger (スティンガ, Sutinga) and his handling of the guns (Ebony and Ivory). Other gameplay elements were based on the fighting-game series Virtua Fighter and Tekken. Dante's use of a shotgun was retained for Capcom's horror game, Resident Evil 4. Hiraki did not find the use fireweapon as stylish but then changed his mind upon watching the film Mad Max. The combination between Dante's swordsmanship and usage of guns with unlimited ammo made the character feel more unique according to Hiraki before the concept of Devil May Cry was conceived. More acrobatic skills were decided by Kamiya in the making of the game including double jumps despite the initial concept of the game as well as flying when Dante used Devil Trigger. This generated difficulties in the designers from the game. To balance the two protagonists, Dante and Nero were given unique gameplay; Dante retained his change of styles from Devil May Cry 3 but could now change between each of them within a battle rather than a stage.

For Devil May Cry 5, Dante and Nero's characters were developed to play completely different in a similar fashion to Devil May Cry 4 as they employ different mechanics. Itsuno still felt that mastering Dante's skills would be more difficult as a result of the multiple modes and weaponry he executes. The weapon Balrog, which acts as a reference to Street Fighter character Balrog, was the first weapon conceived by the team. It was made to be one of the most appealing weapons but at the same time the hardest to master. The motorcycle that works as a weapon, Cavaliere, was based on a Devil May Cry 2 picture somebody drew based on a motorcycle.

=== Ninja Theory redesign ===
Dante in DmC: Devil May Cry

For DmC: Devil May Cry, a reboot of the series, Dante was completely redesigned by Italian concept artist Alessandro Taini (known as Talexi), in response to comments by the Capcom staff. Although his original design was meant to resemble those in previous games, Capcom told the Ninja Theory staff that he needed a redesign to appeal to a younger demographic. Motohide Eshiro said that this Dante was completely different from the previous ones, which was expected to generate criticism. Although the original Dante was designed from a Japanese perspective, the new version was made from a Western perspective. After several drafts of Dante's new appearance, the designers settled on a look inspired by Christopher Nolan's film The Dark Knight. Dante's coat is shorter, only reaching his lower back; his hair is black and shorter, and he has a Devil Trigger form which resembles the original Dante. Art designer Alessandro Taini drew the character as a child and explained in the reboot's origin story why he has white hair. Design director Tameem Antoniades denied rumours that Dante was modeled on him.

Dante was made young in this game, inexperienced and consumed by hatred; his fighting style was more like a street brawler than a skilled swordsman. DmC: Devil May Cry's theme is rebellion, and most of Dante's actions are based on it. Antoniades said that Dante is about "being cool and making you feel cool when you're playing it", and they felt that his attire from previous games would be found comical. Antoniades added that the original Dante was no longer appealing, and when he compared the new Dante with the title character in Bayonetta, her style was not what he wanted for DmC: Devil May Cry. Antoniades responded to criticism by saying that Dante would not be changed (since the character suits the game's setting), and that he liked the new version.

=== Casting ===
In the first Devil May Cry game, Dante was voiced by Drew Coombs. Coombs was happy to be chosen to voice him, since it was his first job involving a video-game character, and he found the game's recording process fun. According to Coombs, he was offered a script for the job and was told that Devil May Cry was a "spin-off" of Resident Evil. He said that he did not wear anything special while playing the character and had basic storyboards in front of him when his movements were videotaped. Asked if he recognized himself in the character's actions, Coombs said that he could not think of anything in particular; his main job was to "bring [Dante] alive" with his voice.

Dante was voiced by Reuben Langdon, who also did motion capture for some scenes in Devil May Cry 3, 4 and 5. Langdon auditioned for the character four times before he was chosen. Although he played the first Devil May Cry game, he was not aware of the title's popularity. Before the release of Devil May Cry 3, Langdon said that fans were angry with the new teenage Dante's look. After its release, however, he said that the fans had come to enjoy the character's new incarnation. Langdon enjoyed his work on the game, saying that "it was one of the most difficult, frustrating and yet rewarding character of anyone I've ever played". As Langdon faced difficulties with the work, he was thankful towards cast director Mary Elizabeth McGlynn as well as Yutaka Maseba from ADR Production who helped him in the making of the game. He felt that he could enjoy the character even more in Devil May Cry 4. GamesRadar+ called Reuben Langdon the character's best voice actor, noting that the other two actors did not fit the character well. Anime News Network agreed, saying that he made the character far more likable in the anime series, despite flaws in the writing. IGN concurred, finding Langdon a better actor than Toshiyuki Morikawa because of his experience with the series.

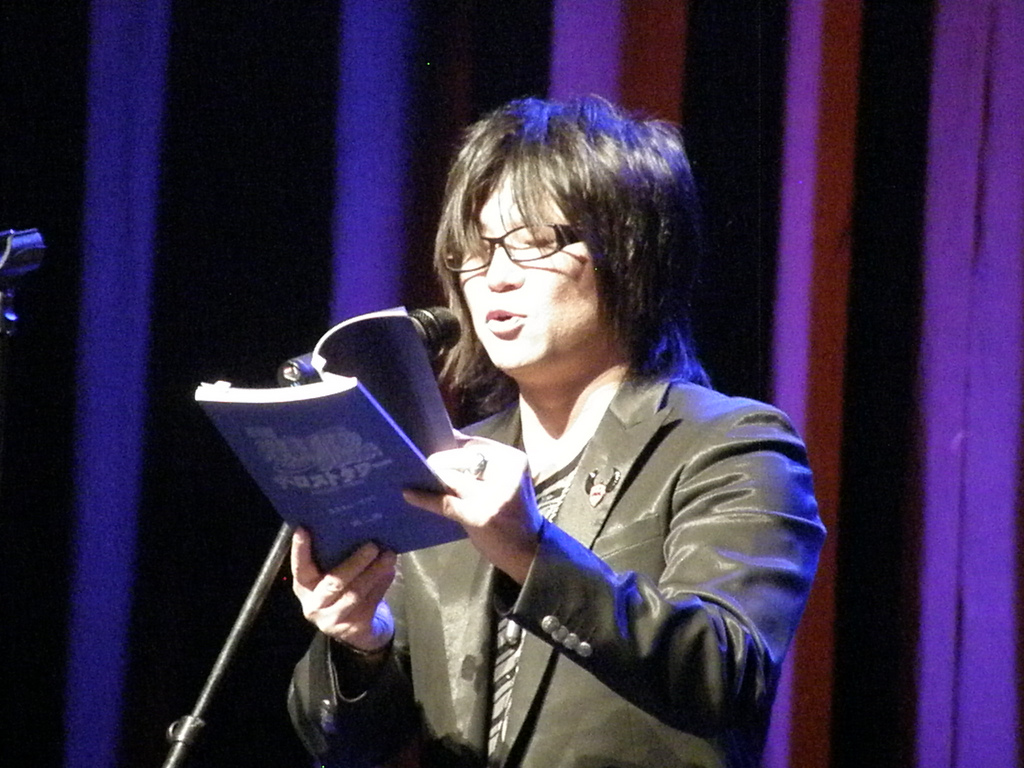
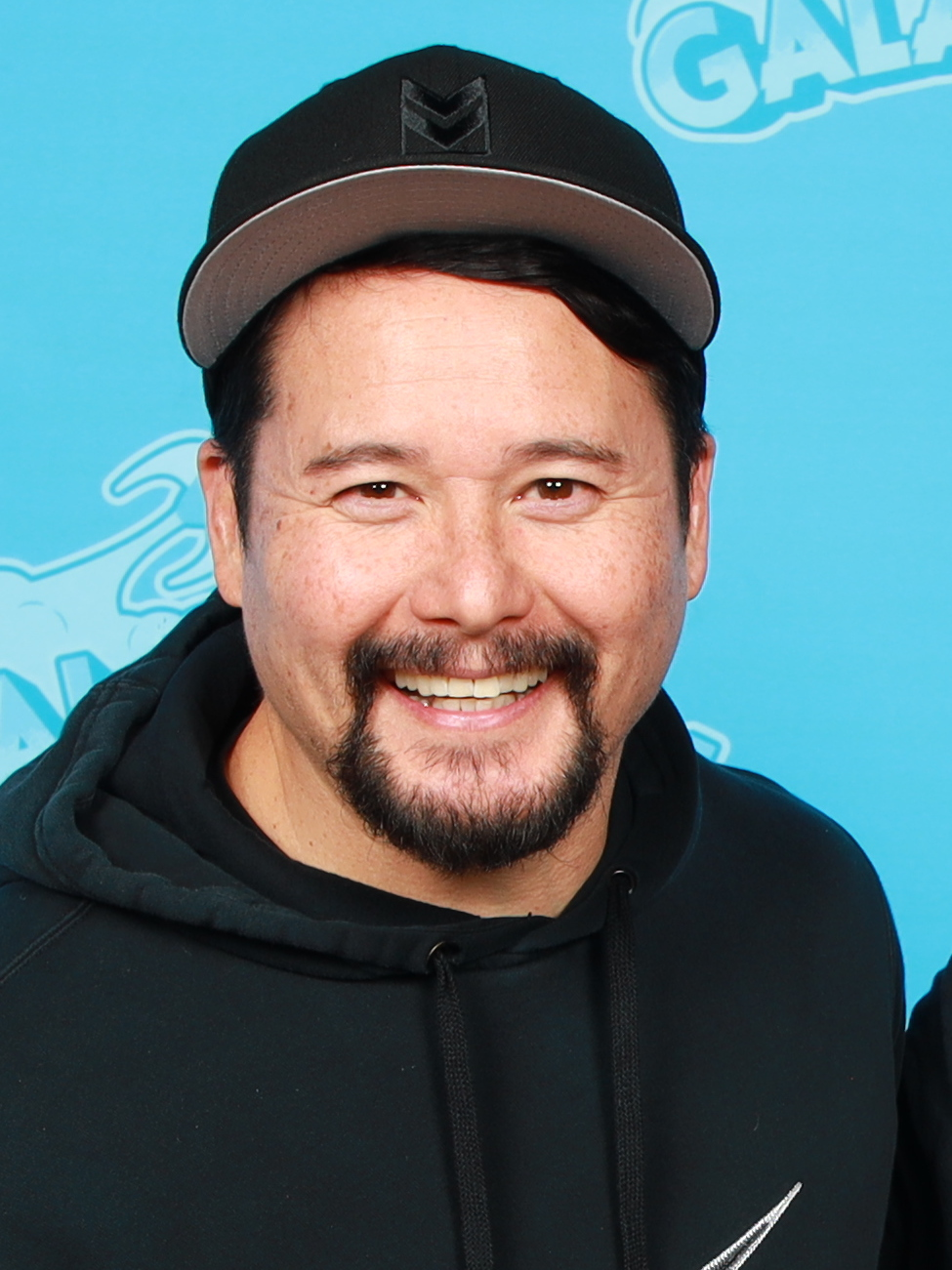
Toshiyuki Morikawa is Dante's voice actor in Japanese while Bosch portrays him in the Netflix series.

During the development of Devil May Cry 3, Langdon found Dante's motion capture difficult. He consulted the staff, since they wanted "a different spin" on the character. Eventually, Langdon decided to do his own rendition of Dante because the staff's suggestions confused him. He was told to make Devil May Cry 4's Dante similar to his Devil May Cry 3 persona, but more mature. Despite the staff's concern about the difficulty of such a portrayal, Langdon had no issues after choosing Roy Focker of the anime series The Super Dimension Fortress Macross (who was near Dante's age) as his character model. Langdon said that his favorite motion capture scene from the series was Dante's banter with the antagonist Agnus during Devil May Cry 4 as they did a take on Japanese stage play originally designed by Yuji Shimura.

In the making of Devil May Cry 5, Langdon did not like reading the script for the first time. Although he enjoyed the story and characters, Langdon stated that the initial draft dialogue was "horrible" and had to rewrite some parts. Translator Mike NcNamara reworked the original dialogue much to Langdon's liking alongside Itsuno's. Langdon worked along with Dan Southworth and Johnny Yong Bosch to improve the English translation of the dialogue which they enjoyed. He found Dante as a more over-the-top character than Nero due to Bosch's acting and his handling of calm scenes. During one scene, Dante performs a parody to one of Michael Jackson's dances which the staff knew Langdon could not perform in motion capture. As a result, this scene was performed by a stunt double known as Shibata.

For the Japanese Devil May Cry installments, Dante was given a Japanese voice actor: Toshiyuki Morikawa. Morikawa believes that the character's appeal stems from his courage and lack of concern about money. Overseeing his characterisation, Morikawa joked that female viewers would only enjoy seeing him fight; he is less adept at daily life, and constantly interested in eating. However, he said that Dante might have sex appeal which would attract female viewers.

Tim Phillipps did Dante's motion capture and voice acting in DmC: Devil May Cry. During auditions for the game, he was quickly selected by Antoniades. The actor had no knowledge of the franchise or the reboot until the reveal teaser. He was disappointed that DmC was not an online game since those games allow him to interact more and demonstrate his work. Phillipps enjoyed Dante's characterisation, he could relate to him, and the motion capture enhanced his interest. Thinking that DmC was a prequel rather than a reboot, Phillips did not play the previous games before he worked on Dante's character.

== Characteristics ==
Dante is a mercenary and private investigator specialising in paranormal cases, preferring those which require demon-slaying. He is muscular, with silverish white hair and piercing icy blue eyes, and usually wears a red duster or trench coat. Dante's arsenal usually consists of firearms and melee weapons, including Ebony and Ivory (エボニー&アイボリ)—twin semi-automatic handguns which never need reloading—and a variety of swords, such as the Rebellion, Force Edge and various "Devil Arms" created from the souls of powerful demons he defeats over the course of each game. The guns are handmade by the gunsmith Nell Goldstein, with "For Tony Redgrave, By .45 Art Warks" written on the slides (Tony Redgrave is Dante's alias). He has superhuman strength, agility, stamina, reflexes, coordination, and a resistance to injury approaching invulnerability as a result of his half-demon heritage. This gives him the ability to enter a heightened state known as Devil Trigger. In this state Dante possesses greater strength and speed, his health regenerates at a steady pace, and he has greater abilities (including flight) with his melee weapon.

He is one of the twin sons of Sparda, a demon knight who sided with humanity and drove back an invasion of the human world by demons about 2,000 years before the series' events. After Sparda's death, Dante and Vergil were raised by their human mother Eva. When Dante and Vergil were children, the family was attacked by demons, and Eva was murdered. His mother's death led to Dante's commitment to hunt the demons who killed her. Dante is confident against opponents, frequently taunting enemies before fighting them. In the games and anime series, Dante is often seen eating pizza. As a result, the limited editions of Devil May Cry 4: Special Edition were packaged in a pizza box.

== Appearances ==
=== Devil May Cry video games ===
In the original Devil May Cry from 2001, the demon hunter Dante is hired by Trish, a powerful woman who resembles his late mother, to prevent the return of the devil king Mundus. However, Trish is actually arranging for Mundus' agents to kill Dante as he makes his way to him. One of the agents is the armored soldier Nelo Angelo later revealed to be the mind-controlled Vergil, Dante's brother. After multiple encounters, Dante defeats Vergil whose body is destroyed, leaving an amulet necessary to unlock their father's legacy, the sword Sparda (スパーダ, Supāda). Trish tries to kill Dante afterwards but Dante spares her when becoming victorious. When Mundus tries to kill Dante, Trish passes Dante her strength to destroy the devil king. Now allied, they become partners in Dante's demon-slaying business, now renamed Devil Never Cry.

In the first sequel, Devil May Cry 2, from 2003, Dante helps Lucia defeat Arius, an international businessman who uses demonic power and wants to conquer the world. At the end of the game, Dante must go into the demon world to stop a demon lord from escaping; the gate closes behind him, and he is trapped. With no way back to the human world, Dante heads deeper into the demon world on his motorcycle.

The third game, Devil May Cry 3: Dante's Awakening, from 2005 is a prequel features a cockier, younger Dante. He is drawn out by Vergil, who is trying to reopen the portal to the demon world to obtain Sparda's full power, which remains on the other side in the Force Edge sword. Dante meets Lady, who is in pursuit of her father Arkham who is working with Vergil but has plans of his own. Inspired by Lady's courage and commitment to her family, Dante continues his business with a greater sense of purpose. At the end of the game, Dante claims ownership of the Force Edge, and Vergil chooses to remain in the demon world. Dante and Lady befriend, with the former deciding to call his shop Devil May Cry after something Lady had said to comfort him.

In the 2008 video game Devil May Cry 4, which takes place after Devil May Cry and Devil May Cry 2, Dante attacks the religious leader of the Order of the Sword founded under Sparda. Trish infiltrates the Order as Gloria to confirm it is Sanctus by handing him Vergil's Yamato sword whereas Dante ends up as a boss character against the game's protagonist, Nero, when he seemingly assassinates Sanctus. Dante falls back while convincing Nero that the Order is more than it appears. Dante later befriends Nero in another match, having intended to take back Vergil's restored sword before deciding to let Nero keep it as they now have a common enemy in Sanctus. After Sanctus kidnaps Nero to use him to power the Savior, Dante becomes playable for the second half of the game as he fights to disable Sanctus completely while saving Nero and his girlfriend Kyrie after they were used to give life to the Savior colossus that Sanctus made into his vessel. Once Sanctus and the Savior are destroyed after Nero and Kyrie escape, Dante entrusts Nero with Vergil's sword.

Dante makes a return appearance as one of the main characters in Devil May Cry 5 in 2019. He is hired by a mysterious man who calls himself V to battle the demon Urizen but is defeated by him in the game's opening scene, presumed to be dead as he ends up missing after his defeat. It is revealed that he spent the next month in a coma protected by the sword Sparda. V eventually manages to locate him, and he spends the next several hours fighting Urizen's forces. Dante uses Rebellion's power to absorb the Sparda into himself, acquiring his new demonic powers alongside a new blade simply named "Dante" (ダンテ). He still discourages Nero from taking part in the battle against Urizen, having learned that Urizen is Vergil, who is also revealed to be Nero's father. After Dante defeats Urizen, V merges with him to reconstitute Vergil. Dante reveals that Vergil is Nero's father before facing his brother in a climactic duel, but Nero intervenes and forces the two to reconcile. Dante and Vergil embark on a one-way trip to the underworld to cut the Qliphoth's root and to seal the portal with the Yamato, leaving the human world in Nero's hands. In the final scene, Dante is shown sparring with Vergil in the underworld, no longer as enemies but as friendly rivals while at the same time fending off waves of demons.

Dante is a playable character in the mobile phone game Devil May Cry: Peak of Combat. During the game's development players criticised Yunchang Games for their rendition of Dante's appearances which resulted into the developers' promising to fix it once the game left the beta period and was released in 2020.

=== DmC: Devil May Cry ===
In DmC: Devil May Cry (2013), a Devil May Cry reboot, Dante has a very different appearance. In his early twenties, he is attacked in a seemingly sentient town known as Limbo City which is inhabited by demons. Dante meets Vergil, who is the leader of the Order—a rogue vigilante group trying to free the world from demons. The city is controlled by the demon king, Mundus, who killed Dante's mother Eva (an angel), and imprisoned his father, Sparda, (a demon and Mundus' former lieutenant), as well as attempting to kill their children, who are revealed to be Nephilim, half-angel, half-demon offspring, with the power to destroy Mundus. Dante joins Vergil's group to oppose Mundus, eventually defeating him and freeing humanity from the demons; however, Vergil's intention to take Mundus' place triggers a fight between the brothers, with Dante being victorious in the end but sparing Vergil's life. In the DLC sequel, Vergil's Downfall, a replica of Dante appears to oppose Vergil in his quest for power and is killed in combat.

=== Other games ===
Dante is also a playable character in several games outside the Devil May Cry series. In the Viewtiful Joe series (also created by Hideki Kamiya), he is playable in the PlayStation 2 version of Viewtiful Joe and the PlayStation Portable version of Viewtiful Joe: Red Hot Rumble. In both games he talks frequently with Alastor, the embodiment of the identically named sword in Devil May Cry. Dante appears as an enemy and an optional ally in the director's cut version of Shin Megami Tensei III: Nocturne, titled Maniax. His inclusion was suggested by the Atlus staff, who thought that he would fit the game's plot and convinced Capcom to include him. Dante is replaced by Raidou Kuzunoha the XIV in the Maniax Chronicle edition and by default in the HD Remaster, but is available as paid DLC in the latter version. Morikawa and Langdon reprise their role as Dante in HD Remaster.

There is a Dante character card in SNK vs. Capcom: Card Fighters DS. Although he was also intended for inclusion in SNK vs. Capcom: SVC Chaos, he was removed from the game. Dante made his second fighting-game appearance as a playable character in Marvel vs. Capcom 3: Fate of Two Worlds / Ultimate Marvel vs. Capcom 3, and is playable in Marvel vs. Capcom: Infinite which details his fight against a being named Ultron Sigma. As downloadable content in Infinite, Dante's look can be altered to show his DmC appearance.

Dante was scheduled to appear in Soulcalibur III, but did not make it into the final game. Dante is a playable character in the tactical role-playing game Project X Zone, with Demitri Maximoff of Darkstalkers as his partner. He returns in the sequel, Project X Zone 2, with Vergil as his partner. Dante is a playable character in PlayStation All-Stars Battle Royale as his DmC: Devil May Cry incarnation. The use of his DmC look (instead of his original persona) was criticised by fans, who were advised by SuperBot Entertainment to enjoy the character's gameplay mechanics. Dante also appeared in Capcom's mobile fighting game, Puzzle Fighter, and the card game Teppen. He is also a guest character in Atlus' Shin Megami Tensei: Liberation Dx2 mobile phone game. The character's visual appearance has also been featured in Astro's Playroom and as downloadable content in Capcom's Monster Hunter, Sengoku Basara 4 and Street Fighter V. A Mii Fighter costume based on Dante was added to Super Smash Bros. Ultimate via downloadable content on June 29, 2021. In Punishing: Gray Raven, Dante appears as a DLC playable character released on May 22, 2025.

Dante's appearance in Shin Megami Tensei III: Nocturne included a sticker in the cover reading "Featuring Dante from the Devil May Cry series". The sticker became a meme, being inserted into other games' covers. In 2021, Sega provided a high-quality rendition of the sticker.

=== In other media ===
He appears in other media based on the video games, including two light novels by Shinya Goikeda. A young Dante, Tony Redgrave (トニー) is chased by assassins, and he searches for a demonic statue, known as the Beastheads, in a Devil May Cry 2 prequel. A Devil May Cry 4 novel by Bingo Morihashi reprises Dante's role in the game, revealing his interest in Nero after discovering his resemblance to his brother Vergil. A Devil May Cry 3 manga follows Dante before the game's events; a comic of the first game was published by Dreamwave Productions, and an anime, Devil May Cry: The Animated Series, follows him as he solves cases involving demons while guarding a young girl named Patty Lowell. DmC: Devil May Cry's version of Dante appears in the game's prequel comic, DmC: Devil May Cry: The Chronicles of Vergil, when he receives the Rebellion sword to fight demons. The anime inspired two CD dramas whose narrative involves Dante's life. In 2019, Tomio Ogata authored a manga that features Dante's actions in Devil May Cry 5 as he meets V.

In the play Sengoku Basara vs. Devil May Cry he was played by Hiroki Suzuki. In the musical Devil May Cry: The Live Hacker, he was portrayed by Ryōma Baba. The popularity of the Devil May Cry series led to a line of action figures, produced by Toycom;

In Studio Mir's 2025 animated series, Dante is voiced by Johnny Yong Bosch. There, the US Government seek Dante's amulet he inherited from his mother and is found through Enzo. Dante faces the White Rabbit, a demonic terrorist, orchestrates a break-in at the Vatican City Museum so that he can steal the Force Edge, a sword once owned by the Sparda. Baines hires mercenaries to track down Dante and procure the amulet, overseen by an elite team of DARKCOM agents led by Mary Ann Arkham. After being captured, Dante faces the White Rabbit, a demonic terrorist seeking to merge the human and demon realms and needs Dante's amulet. Dante awakens his demon powers in the fights while protecting humans. Although Dante manages to protect the world from the White Rabbit's forces, he is paralyzed by Mary and cryogenically imprisoned by the military who take his items. In the second season, Dante is released from the cryogenic prison when a war erupts between humanity and the demon realm. He allies with Mary(Lady) after she questions DARKCOM on its methods and Arius's role involving the Arcana Chalice. Dante ends up facing his twin brother Vergil, who is an enforcer of the demon king Mundus. Dante tries to reconcile with Vergil and faces greater threats together. After ruining Arius's plans, Dante continues protecting the human realm and meanwhile accepts his demonic heritage. The conflict between him and Vergil stays unresolved.

== Reception ==
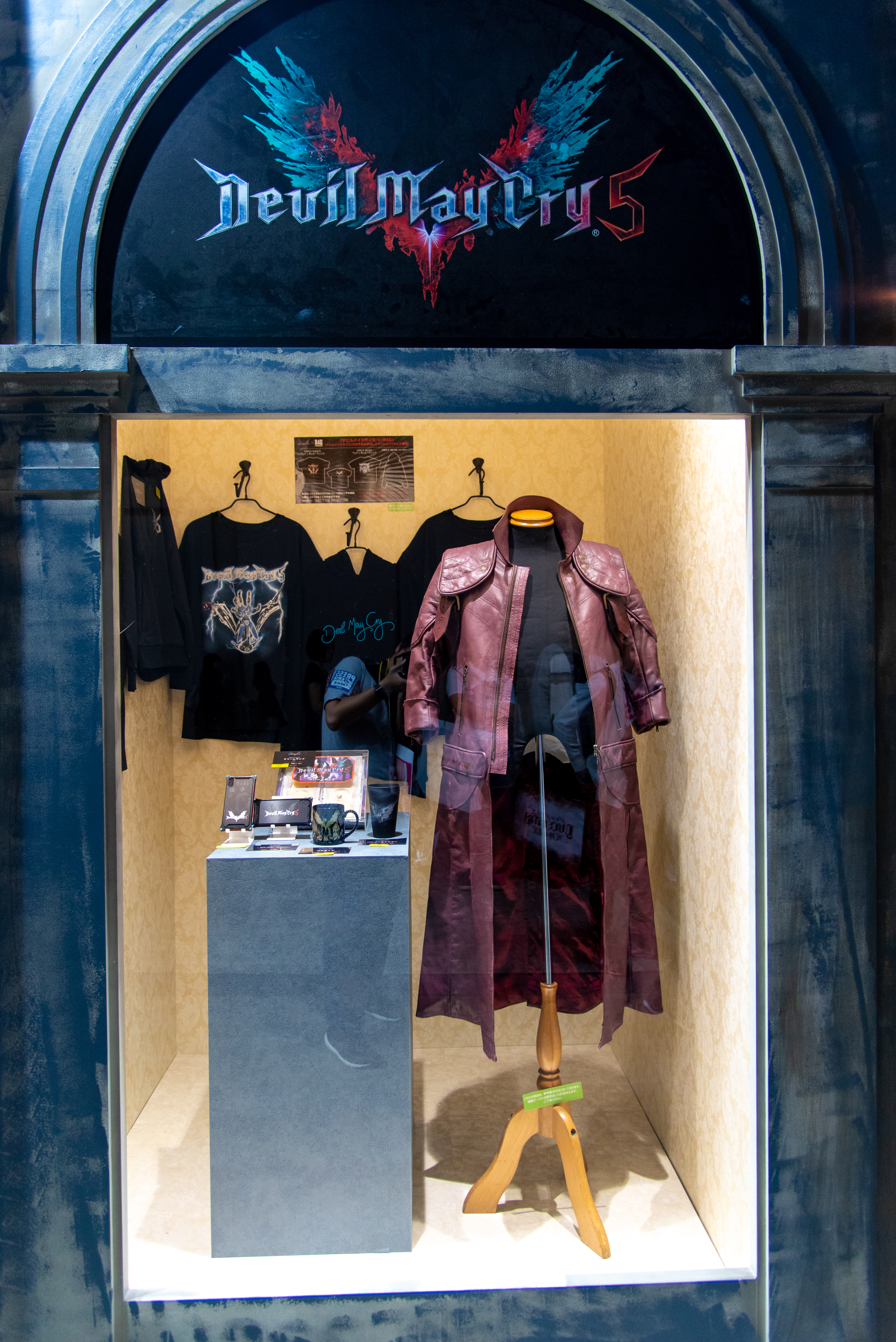
A jacket based on Dante's from Devil May Cry 5 was used to promote the game.

=== Popularity and promotion ===
Because of the character's popularity and Capcom publishing ports for the series on the Nintendo Switch in 2019 and 2020, multiple gamers speculated about the possible inclusion of him as downloadable content in Nintendo's fighting game Super Smash Bros. Ultimate. Devil May Cry director Hideaki Itsuno talked about the possibility of Dante becoming a guest character. But he noted that it might not be possible since at the time he was interviewed about it, Devil May Cry had not been released for Nintendo consoles. However, he also noted that Cloud Strife from Final Fantasy VII made it to the game even though the game had not been released for Nintendo's consoles; he hoped Dante would be added to the cast. Dante was added as a Mii Fighter costume to the game on June 29, 2021, later resulting to Devil May Cry's fans outcry on Twitter, following over the disappointing character reveal. In a pole hosted by Capcom in 2024, Dante was voted as the companies most popular character.

In promoting Devil May Cry 5, Capcom produced replicas of the character's jacket as limited editions for Japanese gamers. In another promotion, Sony used Dante's image alongside Morikawa's voice to promote pizza. In Japan, there were limited releases of the game that included a jacket based on Dante's. Hideki Kamiya of PlatinumGames has said that he was approached about having the Sega character Bayonetta included in Project X Zone 2; he refused, wanting Bayonetta and Dante to meet "on his own terms". Kamiya came to regret his decision, realising that fans would have enjoyed the interaction between the characters; if there is a Project X Zone 3, he would strongly support Bayonetta's inclusion.

=== Critical response ===
Video game publications, including the 2011 version of the Guinness World Records Gamer's Edition, described him as one of the best and greatest video game character. Game Informer called him "one of the most bad-ass characters around" when he was introduced, citing the contrast between his character and those previously seen in the Resident Evil series. GamesRadar+ said that despite Dante's multiple characterizations, "he's a guy who you'll always have a hell of a time playing with." Meristation regarded Dante's design and characterisation provided by Kamiya as one of the biggest reasons for the iconic character's popularity in hack and slash games. IGN described the character as "a dark antihero kind of guy even a down-in-the-dumps, disgruntled teenager would love." GameSpy described Dante as "awe-inspiring to look at", with attire reminiscent of Vincent Price. Dante has also been noted to have sex appeal that attracts gamers of the series. GamesRadar+ found him as one of the sexiest new characters of the decade; compared with Devil May Cry's female characters, he was the "hottest" of all because of his muscular build, his hair, his fighting abilities and his attitude. Dante's team up with Trish was praised by Inquirer for coming across as apparent romantic once they make peace to defeat Mundus. On the other hand, the protagonist's cocky attitude was largely absent from Devil May Cry 2, a major criticism of the game. The articles involving his sex appeal led to a comparison with Bayonetta's title character, especially in his Devil May Cry 4 persona, based on their personalities and actions.

Critics noted a departure in Dante's character starting with Devil May Cry 3 with The Escapist noting that thanks to Reuben Langdon's talent as the protagonist's voice actor and Bingo Morihashi's writing, the character became far iconic and deeper than in his other appearances, most notably 'Devil May Cry 2 and DmC: Devil May Cry whose take on the protagonist was too different from the one Kamiya created. The writer brought parallels with other iconic game characters like Bayonetta or Kratos from God of War who became the most iconic action game characters of their generations. PlayStation LifeStyle said as Dante is Hideki Kamiya's creation, he was reinterpreted by Hideaki Itsuno in a different style starting with Devil May Cry 3. Nero's personality and gameplay highly differs from Dante's in both Devil May Cry 4 and Devil May Cry 5 with Dante being more stylish and superior to Nero. Alejandro Rodríguez from National Autonomous University of Mexico noted that Dante's journey in Devil May Cry 3 makes a large homage to Dante Alighieri's Divine Comedy. Just like Alighieri, Dante goes to confront his brother Vergil who is releasing demon to the human world in the form of a tower that represents Hell. Across his journey, Dante meets demons like Cerberus or Leviatan who are famous in myths. Several of these creatures that Dante faces are direct references to the Seven Deadly Sins though the lore present in Dante's story is its own when compared to the Divine Comedy in order to face Vergil. Among other relationships, Dante was positive for his team up Lady, to the point his role in Devil May Cry 3 was felt be superior to Kamiya's original take. According to UK Anime Network, his personality in the Devil May Cry 3 prequel manga lacked development; he appeared unlikable, and the script gave him strange lines.

Early impressions of Dante's appearance in Devil May Cry 5 trailer were also positive. GameSpot noted how fans enjoyed his role as well as design, while VG247 found him more of a "charmer" than in his previous incarnations due to his interactions with other characters. The Guardian highly enjoyed Dante's cocky personality despite him being far older than in previous games. GamesRadar+ also enjoyed his rivalry with Vergil. Destructoid enjoyed the impact Vergil has on both Dante and Nero in the latest game. In the story both his brother and son become far more serious as they take it upon themselves to stop their relative's threat. Despite liking Dante's relationship with Nero to the point of comparing to them as father and son, USGamer found Dante's treatment of the younger demon hunter mean-spirited even though the character later reveals he does not want Nero to face Vergil because of their connection. The fact that Dante and Nero are revealed to be relatives was praised by Destructoid and how their connection with Vergil strengthens the narrative.

Fan reaction to the character's design in the DmC: Devil May Cry reboot was mainly negative. Hideki Kamiya said that it was based on modern, rebellious youth; although he missed the original Dante, he hoped that people would get used to the new version. Since the nephilim brothers of DmC are now half demon and half angel, Marcel Poorthius and Frank G. Bosman from University of Heidelberg noted 'DmC brings religious overtones; Ninja Theory made a more direct reference to the way religion is portrayed in gaming while showing the parallels between the identical twins. Dave Riley of Anime News Network compared the reboot's character with the young Dante from Devil May Cry 3, criticising him as a "pretty generic adolescent power fantasy" including swearing when he confronts enemies. Several writers on other websites criticised the fan base's negative reaction to the new character design instead, saying that they were influenced solely by the character's look; his personality was very close to the original Dante. Reuben Langdon was disappointed with Dante's characterisation in the reboot after having looked forward to it. According to Langdon, Hideaki Itsuno was bothered by Dante's change in the reboot along with the major changes in the game to the point he thought about quitting Capcom. However, in contrast to Langdon's comments, Itsuno himself has gone on record saying he "really wanted to make a DmC: Devil May Cry 2". Itsuno even remarked, "I was really pumped up to do it, and then that didn't happen. So… when it came time to make a new game, we said, alright, let's make Devil May Cry 5. We had these people that didn't work on DmC and people that did. Because we had these two sides mixing, it was like alright, we're going to make Devil May Cry 5 – it's not going to be a sequel to DmC, but we definitely want to do what we can to take what we learned from that game too." 1UP.com praised Ninja Theory for removing some of Dante's old, unappealing characteristics and making him an approachable protagonist for players. According to IGN, the redesigned hero is more relatable for players. However, a VideoGamer.com reviewer said that the new Dante lacked some of the original's iconic features.

The expansion of Dante's relationships through Madhouse, Inc.'s anime was also found appealing despite his quieter personality. Otaku USA said that in the anime Dante remained faithful to his game version in his actions, most notably the gory (but limited) fighting. When it came to Dante's personality in the anime, IGN found Langdon as good as the Japanese Toshiyuki Morikawa because of his experience with the series, resulting in both delivering good one-liners when fighting. Anime News Network found his relationship with the young Patty appealing though there are moments the reviewer found Dante bored.

When it came to the Netflix series, io9 found Dante as one of the most enjoyable characters, leaving the rest bland in comparison as a result of the gags and energetic scenes he makes. IGN felt that while at first Dante comes across as too comical as Deadpool from Marvel Comics, the plot and Johnny Yong Bosch's performance helps to give him further depth. George Foster of The Gamer detailed criticisms towards the show's incarnation of Dante, stating fans found Dante "much more carefree and meme-y" that was "much more similar to Deadpool [...] than he is to his character in the games" while David Opie of GamesRadar+ stated "it feels like Devil May Cry is trying to convince you of Dante's coolness, rather than simply showing it". With the release of Season 2, Lucas Simons was critical of the show's incarnation of the character, stated Dante was "treated like a ragdoll at best, or worse, sidelined by all other characters" that was consistently overshadowed by other characters, being "sidelined and beaten to a pulp for two consecutive seasons". This led Simons to question Dante's status as the protagonist, stating "what would it be of Devil May Cry without its main character?"
