= Devil May Cry (video game) =

2001 video game

- North American PlayStation 2 box art
- Developer: Capcom Production Studio 4
- Publisher: Capcom
- Director: Hideki Kamiya
- Producer: Hiroyuki Kobayashi
- Artists: Makoto Tsuchibayashi; Yoshinori Matsushita; Sawaki Takeyasu
- Writers: Hideki Kamiya; Noboru Sugimura
- Composers: Masami Ueda; Masato Kouda; Misao Senbongi
- Series: Devil May Cry
- Platforms: PlayStation 2; PlayStation 3; Xbox 360; PlayStation 4; Windows; Xbox One; Nintendo Switch
- Release: August 23, 2001: PlayStation 2; JP: August 23, 2001; NA: October 17, 2001; PAL: December 7, 2001 Nintendo Switch; WW: June 25, 2019; JP: June 27, 2019 HD Collection; PlayStation 3, Xbox 360; JP: March 22, 2012; NA: March 29, 2012; EU: April 3, 2012; AU: April 5, 2012 PlayStation 4, Windows, Xbox One; WW: March 13, 2018
- Genres: Action-adventure, hack and slash
- Mode: Single-player

Devil May Cry (Note: Japanese: デビル メイ クライ, Hepburn: Debiru Mei Kurai) is a 2001 action-adventure game developed and published by Capcom for the PlayStation 2. Set on a remote island, the story centers on Dante, a demon hunter who uses his business to carry out a lifelong vendetta against all demons. He meets a woman named Trish who takes him on a journey to defeat the demon lord Mundus, who is responsible for the deaths of Dante's brother and mother.

Devil May Cry was conceived by Capcom developers as a possible concept for Resident Evil 4. Due to the staff feeling it would not fit the Resident Evil franchise, the project became its own title. Several gameplay elements were also inspired by a bug found in Onimusha: Warlords. It is very loosely based on the Italian poem Divine Comedy by the use of allusions, including its protagonist Dante (named after Dante Alighieri) and other characters like Trish (Beatrice Portinari) and Vergil or Nelo Angelo (in later games revealed to be a brainwashed Vergil, who represents the Roman poet Virgil).

Devil May Cry received prominent coverage in the video game media due to the impact it had in the action-adventure genre, its high difficulty, and the high overall scores given to it by professional reviewers. It has sold more than 2.16 million copies,spawned multiple sequels and a prequel, and is considered among the greatest video games ever made.

Devil May Cry would go on to spawn a franchise, consisting of four sequels and a reboot, and two animated series. It has been cited as the beginning of a subgenre of arcade-style hack and slash melee focused action-adventure games called "character action" or "Extreme Combat", which focus on powerful heroes fighting hordes of foes with a focus on stylish action using a variety of attacks and weapons.

== Gameplay ==
Devil May Cry consists of levels called "missions", where players must fight numerous enemies, perform platforming tasks, and occasionally solve puzzles to progress through the story. The player's performance in each mission is given a letter grade, starting with D, increasing to C, B, and A, with an additional top grade of S. Grades are based on the time taken to complete the mission, the amount of "red orbs" gathered (the in-game currency obtained from defeated enemies, destroyed objects, and exploration), how "stylish" their combat was, item usage, and damage taken.

Dante attacks an enemy using the sword Alastor. The word "Cool!" qualifies the player's performance in combat.

"Stylish" combat is defined as performing an unbroken series of varied attacks while avoiding damage, with player performance tracked by an on-screen gauge. The more hits the player makes, the higher the gauge rises. The gauge starts at "Dull"; progresses through "Cool", "Bravo", and "Absolute"; and peaks at "Stylish". Repeatedly using the same moves causes the gauge to stop rising, encouraging the player to use every move in their arsenal. The gauge terms are similar to the grades given at the end of the missions. When Dante receives damage, the style rating resets back to "Dull". Players can also maintain their style grade by taunting enemies at close range.

The player can temporarily transform Dante into a more powerful demonic creature by using the "Devil Trigger" ability. Doing so adds powers based on the current weapon and changes Dante's appearance. The transformations typically increase strength and defense, slowly restore health, and grant special attacks. The ability is governed by the Devil Trigger gauge, which depletes as the ability is used, and is refilled by attacking enemies or taunting in normal form.

Devil May Cry contains puzzles and other challenges besides regular combat gameplay. The main storyline often requires the player to find key items to advance, in a manner similar to puzzles in the Resident Evil games, as well as optional platforming and exploration tasks to find hidden caches of "orbs". Side quests, called "Secret Missions" in it, are located in hidden or out-of-the-way areas and are not required for completion, but provide permanent power-ups. They typically challenge the player to defeat a group of enemies in a specific manner or within a time limit, or solve a puzzle.

== Plot ==
Devil May Cry begins with Dante (Drew Coombs) being attacked in his office by a mysterious woman named Trish (Sara Lafleur). He impresses her by easily brushing off her assault, and explains that for years, he has hunted demons in pursuit of the ones who killed his mother and brother. Trish explains that her attack was a test, and that the demon emperor Mundus (Tony Daniels), whom Dante holds responsible for the deaths of his family, is planning to cross over into the human world after centuries of imprisonment. The scene jumps to their arrival at an immense castle on the mysterious Mallet Island, where Mundus has steadily grown his power and influence over the years in preparation for his ascension. Trish quickly abandons Dante, who is forced to continue on his own.

Dante explores the castle, fighting off demons summoned by Mundus to attack him and overcoming all sorts of devious puzzles, traps, and tricks. He also obtains two magical weapons, a sword called Alastor and a pair of gauntlets known as Ifrit, and encounters the first of Mundus' servants, a giant spider/scorpion demon known as Phantom. Dante wins their battle, but Phantom escapes and swears revenge before Dante eventually impales and kills him. Dante goes on to defeat the other servants: a giant demon bird known as Griffon (Howard Jerome), a living bioweapon referred to as Nightmare, and a masked "dark knight" known as Nelo Angelo (David Keeley) who impresses Dante with his confidence. In their first battle, Dante manages to defeat Nelo Angelo and is about to deliver the final blow when his opponent suddenly overpowers him. Nelo Angelo prepares to kill Dante, but hesitates and then flees upon seeing the half-amulet Dante wears, which contains a picture of his mother. After two more encounters, his true identity is revealed as Dante's identical twin brother, Vergil, brainwashed by Mundus and made one of his minions. After Vergil seemingly dies, his amulet joins with his brother's half, and "Force Edge", Dante's primary sword which he inherited from his father, changes into its true form and becomes the Sparda sword.

When Dante tries to save Trish from Nightmare, she betrays him and reveals that she is a spy for Mundus, but when her life is endangered, Dante chooses to save her. Claiming he did so only because of her resemblance to his mother, he warns her to stay away. Yet when he finally confronts Mundus, who is about to kill Trish, Dante again chooses to save her and is injured. Mundus fires a beam to kill him, but Trish takes the attack instead. This unleashes Dante's full power, thus allowing him to take on the form of Sparda. Dante and Mundus then battle on another plane of existence.

Despite Mundus' overwhelming power, Dante is victorious, and, believing her to be dead, leaves his amulet and sword with Trish's body before departing. Returning to the island, Dante finds that the castle is collapsing, and is cornered by the injured Mundus, having used the last of his power to cross over into the human world. Dante fights Mundus, but is unable to defeat him until Trish suddenly appears and infuses Dante's guns with her magic. Dante banishes Mundus back to the demon world, and the emperor vows to one day return and finish his conquest. When Trish tries to apologize, she begins to cry, and Dante tells her it means she has become human and not just a devil, because "devils never cry". Dante and Trish escape on an old biplane as the island falls into the sea. After the credits, it is revealed that Dante and Trish are working together as partners, and have renamed Dante's business "Devil Never Cry".

== Development ==
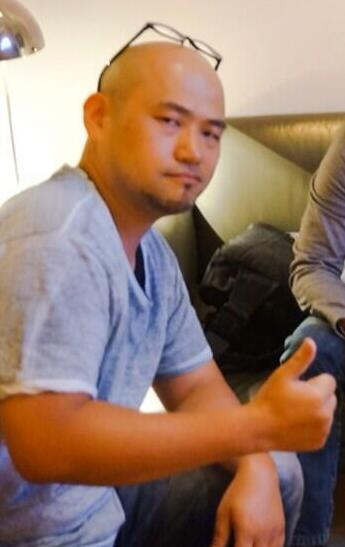
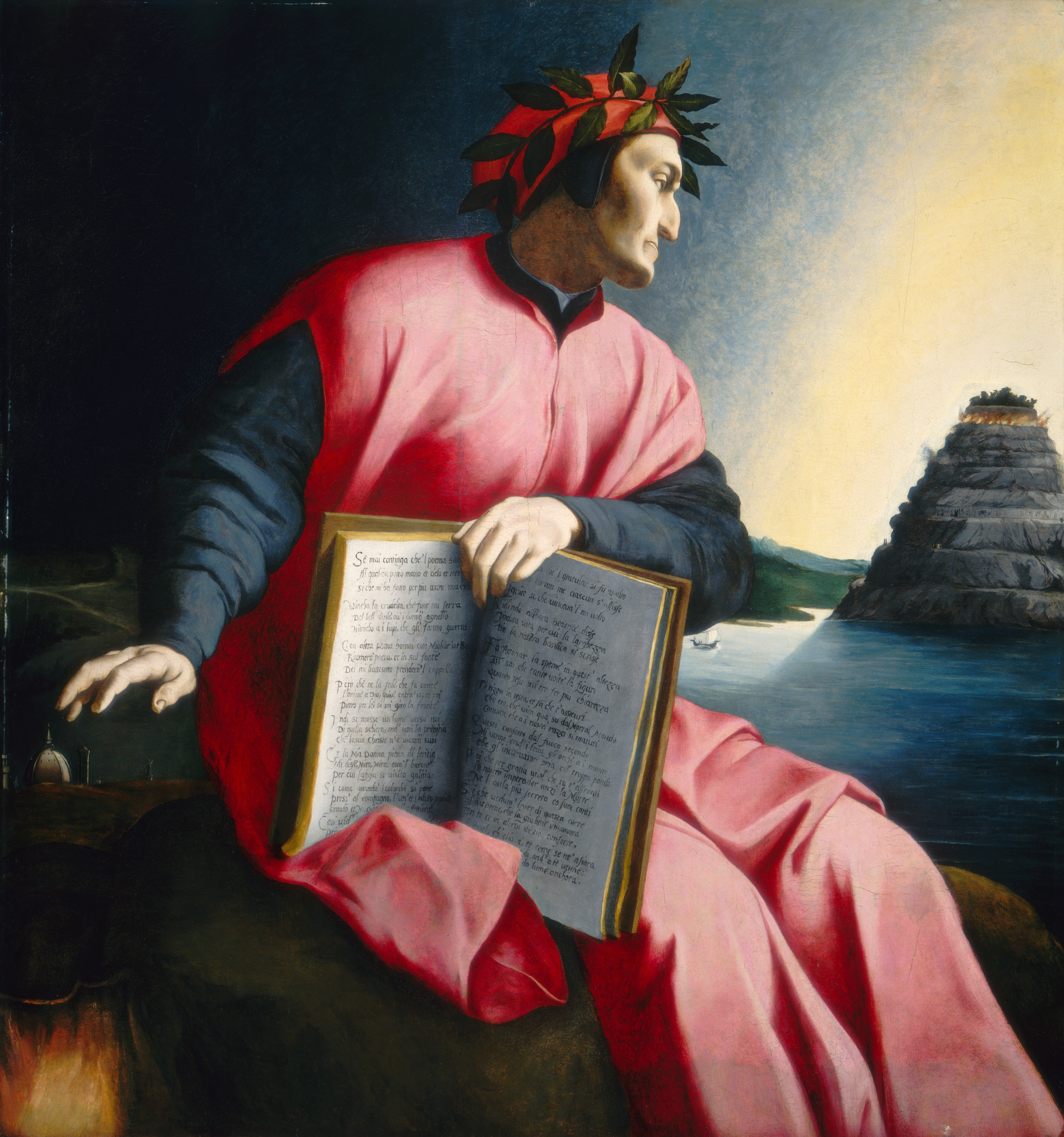
Director Hideki Kamiya (left) based Devil May Cry loosely on the Italian poem Divine Comedy by Dante Alighieri (right).

First hinted at in early December 1999, Devil May Cry started out as the earliest incarnation of Resident Evil 4. Initially developed for the PlayStation 2, it was directed by Hideki Kamiya after producer Shinji Mikami put him in charge of crafting a fourth entry in the Resident Evil series. Around the turn of the millennium, regular series writer Noboru Sugimura created a scenario for the title, based on Kamiya's idea to make a stylized action-adventure game that would break from the usual slow-paced action of Resident Evil. The story was based on unraveling the mystery surrounding the body of protagonist "Tony", an invincible man with skills and an intellect exceeding that of normal people, his superhuman abilities explained with biotechnology.

As Kamiya felt the playable character did not look brave and heroic enough in battles from a fixed angle, he decided to drop the prerendered backgrounds from previous Resident Evil installments and instead opted for a dynamic camera system. This new direction required the team to make a trip to Europe where they spent eleven days in the United Kingdom and Spain photographing things like Gothic statues, bricks, and stone pavements for use in textures.

Upon viewing the team's progress, Mikami decided against using their work as he felt a fast-paced "stylish" action game was inconsistent with the survival horror aspects of Resident Evil. Instead, he advised them to turn their work into a separate game with its own identity. Kamiya eventually rewrote the story to be set in a world full of demons, inspired by the Italian epic poem Divine Comedy by Dante Alighieri; he changed the hero's name to "Dante". The title character from Buichi Terasawa's manga series Cobra served as the basis for Dante's personality. Kamiya based his idea of Dante on what he perceived as stylish: wearing a long coat to make the character "showy" and having him enjoy food rather than smoking. The character wears red because, in Japan, it is a traditional color for a heroic figure. Kamiya has also stated he perceives Dante as "a character that you would want to go out drinking with", someone who was not a show-off but would instead "pull some ridiculous, mischievous joke" to endear people to him. He added that this aspect was intended to make the character feel familiar to audiences. Its new title was revealed as Devil May Cry in November 2000.

Devil May Cry was developed by Team Little Devils, a group of staff members within Capcom Production Studio 4. Some of the major gameplay elements were partially inspired by a bug found in Onimusha: Warlords. During a test-play, Kamiya discovered that enemies could be kept in the air by slashing them repeatedly; this inspired him to incorporate juggling enemies with guns and sword swings in Devil May Cry. According to the director, Devil May Cry was designed from the ground up around Dante's acrobatics and combat abilities. The decision was made late in the development process to change it to a more mission-based advancement, instead of the more open-ended structure of the Resident Evil games. Devil May Cry's difficulty was intentional, according to Kamiya, who called it his "challenge to those who played light, casual games". Yuichiro Hiraki worked on the motion capture involving Dante, his characterization and fighting style upon hearing director Hideki Kamiya's concept.

According to Eurogamer, an earlier Capcom arcade video game, Strider (1989), was a vital influence on Devil May Cry. According to Retro Gamer, the over-the-top action of Devil May Cry draws from Strider.

== Reception ==
Reception

Aggregate score
Aggregator	Score
Metacritic	PS2: 94/100; NS: 74/100

Review scores
Publication	Score
AllGame	4/5
Eurogamer	9/10
Famitsu	9/10, 8/10, 9/10, 8/10
Game Informer	9.5/10
GamePro	5/5
GameSpot	9.1/10
GameSpy	4.5/5
IGN	9.6/10
Next Generation	4/5
The Electric Playground	9/10
GameCritics.com	9/10

Devil May Cry received a "Gold" sales award from the Entertainment and Leisure Software Publishers Association (ELSPA), indicating sales of at least 200,000 copies in the United Kingdom. By July 2006, Devil May Cry had sold 1.1 million copies and earned $38 million in the United States alone. Next Generation ranked it as the 48th highest-selling game launched for the PlayStation 2, Xbox or GameCube between January 2000 and July 2006 in that country. Combined sales of the Devil May Cry series reached 2 million units in the United States by July 2006.

Devil May Cry received critical acclaim, with reviews typically praising its gameplay innovations, action, visuals, camera control, and gothic ambience. (Note: Attributed to multiple sources:) Andrew Reiner at Game Informer summarized their review by saying the game "makes Resident Evil look like a slow zombie". It was nominated for GameSpot's annual "Best Action/Adventure Game" prize among console games, which went to Grand Theft Auto III. Devil May Cry also frequents several Top Video Games of All Time lists. Gamefury, for instance, listed Devil May Cry at #31 in their Top 40 Console Games of All Time feature. In 2010, IGN listed it at #42 in their "Top 100 PlayStation 2 Games". Dante also received noteworthy praise to the point of becoming one of the most famous characters in gaming.

Devil May Cry was also subject to criticism, however. Next Generation objected to the difficulty level, wondering if the challenge was added to prolong the gameplay. James Tapia at The Electric Playground pointed to the unusual control scheme and lack of configuration options. Russell Garbutt GameSpy cited the camera's behavior, the learning curve for the controls, and graphical shortcomings such as flickering and jagginess. Shahed Ahmed at GameSpot criticized its conclusion for its dramatic change in gameplay to a rail shooter-like style at the story's climax, as well as a leveling-off of the difficulty. Mike Doolittle at Gamecritics felt that the story was overly short and the characters were underdeveloped.

== Legacy ==
Devil May Cry spawned a sequel, Devil May Cry 2 and a prequel, Devil May Cry 3: Dante's Awakening; both of which have sold more than two million copies. Devil May Cry 4 was released on February 5, 2008, in the United States for PlayStation 3, Xbox 360 and PC. Total sales for all versions as of February 10, 2016 is well over 3 million copies. It has likewise resulted in the release of two novels by Shinya Goikeda, and an anime series. On October 15, 2004, three years after its release, a soundtrack containing its music was released alongside the soundtrack to Devil May Cry 2. Plans for a PlayStation Portable installment, tentatively titled Devil May Cry Series, and a live action film adaptation have been announced, although it was later confirmed in 2009 that the PSP adaptation of Devil May Cry was officially cancelled. A reboot titled DmC: Devil May Cry was released in 2013 by Ninja Theory and Capcom. Kamiya considers his 2009 video game Bayonetta to have evolved from Devil May Cry although he played the sequel Devil May Cry 4 when developing it. In a 2017 interview with Dengeki PlayStation, Kamiya expressed interest in making a remake of Devil May Cry. A fifth installment, Devil May Cry 5 was released on March 8, 2019. Devil May Cry was ported to the Nintendo Switch on June 25, 2019, worldwide and on June 27, 2019, in Japan.

Devil May Cry has been cited as the beginning of a subgenre of arcade-style hack and slash melee focused action-adventure games called "character action" or "Extreme Combat", which focus on powerful heroes fighting hordes of foes with a focus on stylish action. It has also been described as being the first game that "successfully captured the twitch-based, relentlessly free-flowing gameplay style of so many classic 2D action games". The series has become the standard against which other 3D action-adventure games are measured, with comparisons in reviews of games including God of War, Chaos Legion, and Blood Will Tell.

== See also ==
- Resident Evil 4, During the Development of which Devil May Cry was created.
- Bayonetta, another hack and slash game directed by Hideki Kamiya
- Dante's Inferno, another game based on Inferno by Dante Alighieri with similar gameplay
