= Trish (Devil May Cry) =

Fictional character in Devil May Cry

- Devil May Cry character
- Trish as seen in Devil May Cry 5 (2019)
- First game: Devil May Cry (2001)
- Created by: Hideki Kamiya
- Designed by: Sawaki Takeyasu; Daigo Ikeno (Devil May Cry 2); Tatsuya Yoshikawa (Devil May Cry 4 and 5)
- Voiced by: English: Sarah Lafleur (Devil May Cry and Viewtiful Joe: Red Hot Rumble) Luci Christian (The Animated Series) Danielle Burgio (Devil May Cry 4, Marvel vs. Capcom 3 and Ultimate Marvel vs Capcom 3) Wendee Lee (Devil May Cry 4: Special Edition and 5) Suzi Hunter (Peak of Combat); Japanese: Atsuko Tanaka
- Motion capture: Danielle Burgio (Devil May Cry 4); Ariana Diamant (Devil May Cry 5)

In-universe information
- Species: Demon

Trish (Note: Japanese: トリッシュ, Hepburn: Torisshu) is a character in Devil May Cry, an action-adventure game series by Japanese developer and publisher Capcom. She debuted in the first installment of the series, released in 2001. Trish is a demon taking a female human form to look like the mother of Dante, Eva. She seeks the aid of protagonist Dante in eliminating her creator, Mundus. Besides being a supporting character in subsequent games, she also appears in the other titles created by Capcom.

Hideki Kamiya, with the support of the other designers at Capcom, created Trish. Her long hair caused difficulties for 3D and motion graphic designers; this aspect of her character was revised on multiple occasions: in Devil May Cry 4 (2008), Trish adopted the alter-ego Gloria, which also proved difficult to design. Developers designed Gloria as a sexually explicit character to appeal to the franchise's casual fan-base, though they sought to avoid any vulgarity. Various voice actors have voiced the character throughout the series, including Sarah Lafleur, Luci Christian and Atsuko Tanaka.

Critical reception of Trish has been mostly positive. Reviewers have praised her role in the story, her design, and her relationship with the cast explored in the franchise. Despite the criticism of her movesets in Devil May Cry 4: Special Edition (2015), her inclusion in that game and in the fighting game Marvel vs. Capcom 3: Fate of Two Worlds / Ultimate Marvel vs. Capcom 3 (2011) as a playable character have received positive responses.

== Creation and design ==
Created as the heroine of Devil May Cry, her long hair caused extensive problems for designers when creating her 3D model, most notably during the ending sequence. Motion designer Tomoya Othsubo said making Trish's hairstyle was challenging due its movements in-game; the designers had to add multiple joints to her strands of hair, a process which Othsubo described as a "nightmare". Sawaki Takeyasu, the main artist for Trish, said that she was the first human-like character he had made. Trish was named after Beatrice Portinari from the Divine Comedy. When asked about the relationship between Dante and Trish, Hideki Kamiya stated their bond was more than love.

Character designer Daigo Ikeno stated that for Devil May Cry 2, the team aimed for a contrast between Trish and that game's new heroine, Lucia, making them look as though they were from different races. Hiroyuki Nara was responsible for Trish's inclusion in the game as an unlockable character, and borrowed elements and fight moves from Dante's campaign in the original Devil May Cry for her gameplay in Devil May Cry 2. Nara apologized to the team that created the first game due to the poor quality the sequel had. Nara said multiple designers helped him during the making of Trish's appearance, including in the creation of the flame effects used for her moves. According to Nara, since Devil May Cry 2 had received a negative response from fans and critics, he wanted to redeem himself with the next game, Devil May Cry 3. For this title, he used some of Trish's elements for Dante's new model though he remained ambiguous about which parts.

After being absent from Devil May Cry 3, Trish returned as a supporting character in Devil May Cry 4. Writer Bingo Morihashi said he had no clear understanding of Trish and Dante because these two characters were created by Kamiya. Nevertheless, Morihashi included her in the story as a form of fan service. Morihashi stated that if the story had been focused more on Dante rather than the new protagonist Nero, he might have featured Trish more. Character designer Tatsuya Yoshikawa received notes from director Hideaki Itsuno to make Trish "cute"; Yoshikawa had no difficulty designing her. A fellow designer said Trish had become "the series' sexiest gal". In contrast to her original version, Trish had her hair tied back, making her model easier to animate. Another artist felt the zip on Trish's top was one of her design's key points.

In Devil May Cry 4, Trish appears under the alter-ego Gloria; she poses as an enemy to Dante before revealing herself to the player. Producer Hiroyuki Kobayashi stated that Gloria was meant to be a new, sexually appealing character who replaced the previous heroines in the franchise. Capcom staff members were afraid "to make her sexuality vulgar in any way" while noticing her design was popular with the fanbase. Itsuno said Capcom wanted to make Trish unique in terms of gameplay for the Special Edition. Trish was added to Marvel vs. Capcom 3: Fate of Two Worlds because Capcom wanted to have a "sexy character" in the game, according to producer Ryota Niitsuma.

Trish's English-language dialog is voiced by Sarah Lafleur in Devil May Cry and Viewtiful Joe: Red Hot Rumble, Danielle Burgio in Devil May Cry 4 and Marvel vs. Capcom 3, and Luci Christian in The Animated Series. In Japanese, she is voiced by Atsuko Tanaka in The Animated Series, Marvel vs. Capcom 3 / Ultimate Marvel vs. Capcom 3, and Devil May Cry 4: Special Edition. Tanaka said she liked the relationship between Trish, Lady, and Dante. Tanaka further liked Trish's portrayal in the anime series due to the action displayed in her fight against Lady. She was satisfied with being included in the anime series.

== Appearances ==
=== In Devil May Cry ===
Debuting in Devil May Cry, Trish hires Dante to stop Mundus' plan to conquer the human world by opening a gate on Mallet Island. Later in the game, Dante learns she is Mundus' servant and that her resemblance to his "mother" is part of a plan to lure him to the island so Mundus' servants can kill him. Despite Trish showing her true agenda, Dante saves her life. Deeming her unworthy to serve him, Mundus crucifies Trish to antagonise Dante. During Dante's last fight against the demon lord, Trish reappears and offers her power so he can finish the enemy. The two then become partners.

She appears in the Devil May Cry 2 novel as an alternative persona from a parallel world serving Mundus. The original Dante tries to persuade her to ally with demons fighting against the Lord of Darkness, but he eventually has to kill her. She is a playable character in a bonus section of Devil May Cry 2, separate from the game's plot as she is not present in the story. In the anime The Animated Series, Trish mostly works alone, and occasionally with Dante, who invited her to return. She first appears while accidentally fighting demon hunter Lady who views her as an enemy at first though they become friends after Dante interrupts the battle. Trish and Lady help Dante stop a new demon invasion in the finale of the anime.

Trish reappears in Devil May Cry 4 to work again with Dante. She disguises herself as Gloria, an executive with the Holy Knights of the Order of Sparda—a religious organization that worships Sparda. After the Order's leader Sanctus obtains the power to summon demons from another dimension, Trish goes to protect Fortuna's citizens while Dante goes to dispatch the enemy. In the epilogue, the two receive no payment from Lady, who states Trish made the situation worse. In the updated version of the game, Devil May Cry 4: Special Edition, Trish is once again a playable character.

She is also present in Devil May Cry 5 but unplayable. During the game's beginning, Trish, Lady and Dante are defeated by the Demon King Urizen. Trish and Lady are sealed inside the demons Cavaliere and Artemis respectively, with Dante later saving her once defeating it.

=== Other appearances ===
Trish appears alongside Dante in the PlayStation 2 version of Viewtiful Joe, hitting on him until an enemy captures her. In the PlayStation Portable game Viewtiful Joe: Red Hot Rumble, Trish appears as an alternative skin for the character Sexy Silvia. She is also present in the crossover fighting games Marvel vs. Capcom 3: Fate of Two Worlds and Ultimate Marvel vs. Capcom 3. Her Gloria outfit also appears in the fighting game Street Fighter V as an alternative costume for Laura. The character has also appeared in Onimusha Soul.

== Reception ==
Critical reception of Trish has been positive. Complex called her "charming" and said they liked her abilities, and enthusiastically awaited her appearance in Marvel vs. Capcom 3. Her alter ego Gloria was called one of the most sexually appealing characters in gaming due to her skimpy design. Despite enjoying Trish's redesign and Gloria in Devil May Cry 4, GamesTM was disappointed by her lack of appearances in the sequel and expected to see her as a playable character in an update. Trish and Dante were included in The Inquirer's list of the most memorable video-game love teams; comments focused on the way they join forces to defeat their enemies. The Official Xbox Magazine regarded Trish as an interesting sidekick to Dante based on her personality. Siliconera found her techniques "unique", citing the way she adds traps to the arena and their impact on fighting enemies. In contrast to the positive reception, Play listed Gloria's look as one of the most inappropriate outfits in gaming, describing it as "slutty clubbing gear" rather than a hunter costume. Despite criticizing several parts from Trish' character in her debut, Bloody Disgusting was surprised by the character's remorse involving how she betrays Dante but ends up joining him later following her fake death.

Trish's inclusion in Devil May Cry 4: Special Edition has received a positive response. PCMag stated that her moves seemed to be inspired by her appearances in Devil May Cry 2 and Marvel vs. Capcom 3, describing her as "a very accessible" but difficult-to-master character. Game Informer enjoyed the way Trish can change weapons during fights, saying that while she might be regarded as simple to control, mastering all of her abilities might be so challenging she may be overshadowed by Vergil. IGN liked her moves because of the balance between them and Lady's techniques. Game Revolution liked the Marvel vs. Capcom 3-inspired moves, describing them as appealing. GameSpot offered a less positive opinion, saying Trish might be less entertaining than Lady and Vergil. PushSquare highly praised Trish' new moves, finding them impressive especially when compared with her Devil May Cry 2 persona.

Her character has also been explored in the anime series. Voice actor Fumiko Orikasa said the fight between Trish and Lady was appealing. Hyper had mixed thoughts regarding the episode in which Lady meets Trish through a fight but compared the style of the two female characters to the film The Matrix because both of them are stylish. Anime News Network expressed disappointment at the brevity of Trish's appearances in the anime but still found her English voice acting charming. GroundReport described Trish and Lady as foils for Dante and compared them with the main characters from the manga and anime series GetBackers due to Dante's financial issues, often receiving jobs from Lady. The Fandom Post appreciated the episode in which Lady fights Trish because of a misunderstanding but they befriend each other. The writer also enjoyed the duo's role in the following episodes, most notably in the finale. DVD Talk enjoyed the interactions between Trish, Dante, and Lady and wanted to see more of them in the anime rather than stories focused on Dante facing enemies.
