= Devil May Cry 4: Special Edition =

2015 video game

- Developer: Capcom (Note: Additional work done by Access Games)
- Publisher: Capcom
- Director: Hideaki Itsuno
- Producers: Takashi Fujii; Yoshiaki Hirabayashi
- Designers: Junya Kumabe; Takuya Tanada; Yoshinosuke Nakagawa
- Programmers: Shimoyama Sasuke; Kodama Yoichi
- Artist: Atsushi Nishibori
- Writer: Bingo Morihashi
- Composers: Miwako Chinone; Akihiko Narita
- Series: Devil May Cry
- Engine: MT Framework
- Platforms: PlayStation 4; Windows; Xbox One
- Release: JP: June 18, 2015; WW: June 23, 2015
- Genres: Action-adventure, hack and slash
- Mode: Single-player

Devil May Cry 4: Special Edition (Note: Japanese: デビル メイ クライ4 スペシャルエディション, Hepburn: Debiru Mei Kurai Fō Supesharu Edishon) is a 2015 action-adventure game developed and published by Capcom. A remastered version of Capcom's action-adventure game Devil May Cry 4, it was released for PlayStation 4, Windows, and Xbox One. The game features new playable characters, new cutscenes, polished gameplay, improved graphics, the option to switch between English and Japanese voice tracks in the Japanese release, and additional costumes.

Devil May Cry 4: Special Edition was conceived by director Hideaki Itsuno after working on the action role-playing game Dragon's Dogma (2012) and the reboot DmC: Devil May Cry (2013). Devil May Cry 4: Special Edition received generally positive reviews; the addition of new content and new playable characters, as well as improvements in general, were praised. It was criticized for not fixing the problems of the original game and repeating the same stages when a new character is selected.

== Plot ==
Devil May Cry 4: Special Edition includes the original content from Capcom's 2008 game, in which Nero, a teenager with demonic powers, is ordered by the Order of the Sword to capture a man named Dante. As the story progresses, Nero learns of the dark side of his followers who aim to use him and Dante due to both of them being descendants of the legendary dark knight Sparda. Nero and Dante befriend each other. The original game features Nero and Dante as playable characters while the Special Edition features Vergil, Lady and Trish as bonus playable characters, each with new opening and ending movies.

The Special Edition explains how The Order of the Sword was formed prior to the third game's event. Vergil, a hooded man who is both Dante's older brother and the original owner of Yamato, was investigating the traces left by their father, Sparda. Vergil arrived at Fortuna Island, where The Order of the Sword was under construction. After eliminating the scarecrow demons surrounding him in a slum, Vergil became suspicious of The Order's true intentions on their worship of Sparda. While about to go to visit the church of The Order, Vergil passed a group of pedestrians; a woman in a scarlet dress noticed Vergil as he walked away. After he finished his investigation in Fortuna, Vergil left the town wondering whether the Order is misguided for its worship but vowed it will know the true power of Sparda's son one day.

== Gameplay ==
The movesets of Vergil, Trish and Lady were inspired by DmC: Devil May Cry and other fighting games. Bonus costumes for Trish and Lady were included in the first-print run of the physical version and as a pre-order bonus for the downloadable versions. The game includes bonus costumes and EX-colors for Nero, Dante, Vergil, Lady and Trish. The game also includes Legendary Dark Knight mode, an additional difficulty mode featuring a vastly increased enemy count and a Turbo setting that increases game speed by twenty percent, both of these extras were previously exclusive to the PC version of the original release. The in-game economy was re-tuned for quicker acquisition of Red Orbs and Proud Souls, both of which are used for leveling up skills and purchasing items. The remaster also has uncompressed textures and improved visual effects. A new Japanese language voice track has also been added to the Special Edition in the Japanese release.

Lady's gameplay is a continuation of her debut appearance in Devil May Cry 3; she also has a long-ranged grappling mechanic similar to that of Nero. Lady's combat-style heavily relies on firearms such as a shotgun, handguns and her signature Kalina Ann. Lady has a charging weapon mechanic known as Bullet Gauges, allowing her to quickly charge her weapons’ bullets, granting her powerful firearm attacks up to three levels. Lady can also use double jump and uses a power-up aura for her "Devil Trigger". Much like her playable appearance in Devil May Cry 2, Trish's gameplay remains similar to that of Dante. Trish also retains her flight from the second game while accessing "Devil Trigger". Trish relies on electrokinetic spells such as those in (Ultimate) Marvel vs. Capcom 3: Fate of Two Worlds, and controlling Round Trip movement with the Sword of Sparda for a limited time.

In Special Edition, the player plays all of the game's missions as Vergil, who retains most of his moves from the Special Edition of Devil May Cry 3 but also has elements from DmC: Devil May Cry. His moves are fully upgradable, and a feature was added for his choice of stylized fighting, which is known as the "Concentration" mechanic. The Concentration mechanic is indicated by a blue gauge in the upper left corner of the screen. It has three levels which allow him to make a more powerful attack at higher levels. To increase the gauge, Vergil can attack enemies and dodge their attacks. However, if Vergil is hit by an enemy, runs or misses an attack, the Concentration gauge depletes.

== Development ==
After working on Dragon's Dogma, Capcom's Hideaki Itsuno wanted to work on a new Devil May Cry title, having directed all of them since Devil May Cry 2 (2003) and supervising the 2013 reboot. The idea of improving Devil May Cry 4 inspired him to do this project. The development of the title took a year and a half. Itsuno had clear ideas about improving the gameplay mechanics of that title. Vergil was added to this title and autosaves were added to make the game more accessible. Itsuno was inspired by fighting games to expand the amount of moves of the characters. Vergil's role in the reboot DmC: Devil May Cry was also an inspiration. Itsuno noted some gamers were disappointed because Capcom outsourced Devil May Cry into the reboot from Ninja Theory but wanted to clarify the original series was still ongoing with this updated version of Devil May Cry 4.

Originally, Lady was to be included as an alternative skin but Itsuno feared a negative response and decided to retain her original moves and make Lady a playable character. Some bosses on her campaign mode were redesigned to accommodate her inclusion. Itsuno said Capcom wanted to make Trish's gameplay unique.

Devil May Cry 4: Special Edition is the first game in the series to include Japanese-language audio, which is exclusive to the Japanese release. Nero was voiced by Kaito Ishikawa, while the other cast members already had a Japanese voice in the anime series and other titles. Although Ishikawa tried to follow his English-language counterpart Johnny Yong Bosch when dubbing the character to understand Nero's personality, he found it difficult because he did not understand English. Ishikawa had no previous experience with the series before working on Special Edition but he was encouraged by his friends. Ishikawa met Dante's Japanese voice actor Toshiyuki Morikawa during recording; they interacted many times and Morikawa helped Ishikawa understand the franchise. Ishikawa understood the game better as he worked because it was translated into Japanese and he appreciated the experience.

On December 15, 2014, Capcom announced the game would be released for the PlayStation 4 and Xbox One. Devil May Cry 4: Special Edition was released on June 18, 2015, for the PS4 and Xbox One versions, and June 24, 2015, for the PC version in Japan, and on June 23, 2015, for all announced platforms in other regions. In the games and anime series, Dante is often seen eating pizza so the limited edition of Devil May Cry 4: Special Edition was packaged in a pizza box.

== Reception ==
Reception

Aggregate score
Aggregator	Score
Metacritic	PC: 72/100; PS4: 75/100; XONE: 76/100

Review scores
Publication	Score
Destructoid	9.5/10
Game Informer	8.5/10
GameSpot	6/10
IGN	7.5/10
Gaming Union	8/10
PCMag	4.0/5
Gameplanet	7.5/10

The PS4 and Xbox One version of Devil May Cry 4: Special Edition were met with favorable reviews on Metacritic but the PC version got average reviews. The inclusion of the three new characters prompted a positive response, which also complemented their individual fighting styles. Gaming Union called the game a far-more complete package than the one Capcom released in 2008, while favourably comparing it to the re-released version of Devil May Cry 3. Game Informer said the game's visuals and combat had aged well. Some video game journalists, however, lamented that Capcom did not fix backtracking issues that were now more apparent because Trish's and Lady's stages are reruns of Dante's and Nero's. IGN was bothered by the use of puzzles that stopped players from enjoying the most entertaining parts of the game. Gameplanet's reviewer Syed Mahir Hussain described Vergil's inclusion in Devil May Cry 4: Special Edition as one of the title's greatest strengths because of Vergil's "unique" fighting style.

GamesRadar+'s writer Tom Senior enjoyed "the way Vergil saunters casually through combat". Destructoid said elements of the reboot's version of Vergil were incorporated well into the regular Vergil. Hideaki Itsuno said since the announcement of Special Edition, fans had been wanting to play as Vergil again because of his popularity for the multiple combinations gamers had performed while playing as the character.

Trish's inclusion in Devil May Cry 4: Special Edition has received a positive response. PCMag stated her moves seemed to be inspired by her appearances in Devil May Cry 2 and Marvel vs. Capcom 3, describing her as "a very accessible" but difficult-to-master character. Game Informer enjoyed the way Trish can change weapons during fights, saying while she might be regarded as simple to control, mastering all of her abilities might be so challenging she may be overshadowed by Vergil. IGN liked her moves because of the balance between them and Lady's techniques. GameSpot offered a less-positive opinion, saying Trish might be less entertaining than Lady and Vergil.

Destructoid said Lady is a unique character because she is human and does not possess any demonic powers like the rest of the cast, which makes mastering her fighting style entertaining. PC Magazine expressed a similar sentiment, based on the way her skills contrast to those of the rest of the playable characters. While also finding her enjoyable to play, IGN said Vergil's mechanics make him more appealing and that he overshadows both Trish and Lady. Game Informer was afraid Lady would "feel too gimmicky" but liked her dynamic style.

In the first week of its release in Japan, the game sold 35,872 copies. In July 2015, Capcom announced the Special Edition had sold well, with the majority of units sold digitally. They noted the digital sales of the "Special Edition" were a key contributor to their overall growth for the fiscal quarter. By June 30, 2024, the game had sold 2.80 million copies.
