= Vergil (Devil May Cry) =

Fictional character in the Devil May Cry series

- Vergil as seen in Ultimate Marvel vs. Capcom 3
- First game: Devil May Cry (2001)
- Created by: Hideki Kamiya
- Designed by: Makoto Tsuchibayashi (Devil May Cry); Daigo Ikeno (Devil May Cry 3: Dante's Awakening); Tatsuya Yoshikawa (Devil May Cry 4: Special Edition); Alessandro Taini (DmC: Devil May Cry)
- Voiced by: English: David Keeley (Devil May Cry); Daniel Southworth (Devil May Cry 3, 4: Special Edition, & 5, Ultimate Marvel vs. Capcom 3, Teppen, Punishing: Gray Raven); David de Lautour (DmC: Devil May Cry); Gregg Lowe (Peak of Combat); Robbie Daymond (TV series); Japanese: Hiroaki Hirata
- Motion capture: Daniel Southworth (Devil May Cry 3, 4: Special Edition, & 5); Tim Phillipps (DmC: Devil May Cry)

In-universe information
- Species: Cambion
- Weapon: Yamato (Katana)
- Family: Sparda (father); Eva (mother); Dante (twin brother)
- Children: Nero (son)

Vergil (Japanese: バージル, Hepburn: Bājiru) is a character and the main antagonist of Devil May Cry, an action-adventure game series created by Japanese developer and publisher Capcom. Vergil is the older twin brother and archenemy of the series' original protagonist, Dante, and the father of current series protagonist Nero. He was introduced in the first Devil May Cry game as a boss called Nelo Angelo (ネロアンジェロ, Nero Anjero; which is Italian for "Black Angel"). Vergil is one of two devil-human hybrid sons of one of the devil lords called Sparda, and possesses demonic powers. A re-booted portrayal of Vergil also appears in the 2013 video game DmC: Devil May Cry as the leader of a group of rogue vigilantes bent on stopping the demon king, Mundus. In the main continuity, Vergil is portrayed in voice acting and motion capture by Daniel Southworth.

Vergil was originally portrayed as Nelo Angelo—Dante's rival in terms of moves and appearance—in the 2001 game. Despite the character's apparent death as a child, Devil May Cry director Hideki Kamiya allowed Devil May Cry 3 writer Bingo Morihashi to change this event so Vergil could be featured as a young adult in the prequel game. Many of the series' characters were named after characters in Italian poet Dante Alighieri's poem Divine Comedy; Vergil was named after Virgil.

The character has been well received by video game publications, several of which praised his role as a boss, and his playable inclusion in the special editions of Devil May Cry. His redesign for Ninja Theory's reboot was the subject of praise, finding him more appealing than Dante.

== Creation and concept ==
Vergil's altered version, Nelo Angelo, as seen in Devil May Cry.

Vergil's name was taken from Dante Alighieri's poem the Divine Comedy. The alias Nelo Angelo is a mis-translation of "Nero Angelo" ("Black Angel" in Italian). The misspelling has been maintained throughout the series, including in the novels, due to its popularity. In the original Devil May Cry game, Vergil is said to have been killed by demons early in his life, and his soul is controlled by Mundus. Capcom staff writer Bingo Morihashi wanted to create an alternate scenario in which Vergil was alive, and he was given freedom by Hideki Kamiya to adjust the character's backstory and make Vergil a living teenager for the events of Devil May Cry 3. While his character was designed by Daigo Ikeno for Devil May Cry 3, his Devil Trigger form was created by Kazuma Kaneko. Because no design for Vergil except that of his alter-ego Nelo Angelo existed, Morihashi was put in charge of designing his appearance. Most of Capcom's staff believed Vergil was Morihashi's favorite character. Morihashi stated that the idea of Vergil wielding a Japanese sword, called a Yamato, existed in a previous design. Vergil does not wield guns, unlike Dante; Morihashi said that Vergil's characterization was challenging because, being the older twin brother, he was intended to be more likable than Dante. In addition, the fifth installment of the Devil May Cry series contains an enemy class known as Angelo, based on Nelo Angelo. These enemies are referred to as: Scudo Angelo, a shielded infantry-demon; Proto Angelo, A great-sword wielding demon, and finally, Cavaliere Angelo, which is meant to completely recreate and improve on Nelo Angelo. All 3 of these look similar to Nelo Angelo. As Vergil is hateful of Nelo Angelo, his human counterpart, V, seems to also have some hatred towards them.

The character was made playable in Devil May Cry 3: Special Edition due to extra time the team had after the making of the game. Capcom had to remove some of his moves due to space limitations, but tried keeping the moves he uses when faced as a boss. His move set was made to reflect his calm personality, contrasting with Dante's brash confidence. Vergil was made stronger than Dante, but harder to control, with the player having to learn more moves. Vergil became a popular character among the game's development team; Hideaki Itsuno stated that he was also well received in the United States because several characters from Hollywood films wield a katana. Vergil's popularity resulted in Itsuno discussing ideas for a game focused on Vergil. The team also wanted to add alternate skins for him, such as a Nelo Angelo outfit. Itsuno also planned to add Vergil to Devil May Cry 4, just as in the previous game. When reconsidering whether Vergil could be reskinned, however, the staff thought the fanbase would not like it.

While not making a direct appearance Devil May Cry 4's main storyline, Vergil is revealed to be the father of the game's protagonist, Nero, who possesses Vergil's traits and abilities. Nero would eventually learn this when meeting Vergil in Devil May Cry 5, redesigned to slightly resemble his father. For Devil May Cry 5, Itsuno wanted to portray a villain who would be not be taken lightly by Dante or Nero. The staff found Vergil the best candidate, due to the power he had demonstrated throughout the series, and his relation with the protagonists. The staff wanted to generate a major emotional scene when Vergil reappears in the climax confronting his brother. As a result, the brothers' feud is stopped by Nero who awakens his own demon powers to face his father.

=== Designs ===
Makoto Tsuchibayashi designed Nelo Angelo as a rival for Dante. Unlike other enemy demons from Devil May Cry, Nelo Angelo did not have original movements for the 3D environment; the game designers used those of Dante. Unlike Dante, Nelo Angelo does not have guns; he was instead provided with a projectile move called Summoned Swords (幻影刀, Gen'eitō; lit. "Phantom Sword") to make him stand out. The staff had no problems using the projectiles for the character because the model did not change. Makoto Tsuchibayashi originally aimed to show Vergil in human form with Kamiya supporting his ideas of how the two characters were going to contrast each other.

Ikeno stated that because Vergil and Dante are identical twins, they share a hairstyle in the opening of the game, intended to make new players confuse them. Vergil's clothing was meant to contrast with his brother's; similarly, Nelo Angelo's design was prominently blue while Dante's was red. The staff had problems with the creation of Vergil's outfit because of the way it moved in 3D computer graphics; they joked that Vergil should remove his coat whenever he starts fighting. In order to generate major contrasts between the two brothers, Vergil was given blue clothing as Dante always wore red. Omori did the character's first CGI artwork which was approved by Capcom. From there Daigo Ikeno took over, with Omori believing his work aged well. Like other characters, Vergil's face used a real model; character art designers Hirochika Nagaki and Keiji Nakaoka said Vergil's new 3D model portrayed him the exact same way the production team imagined him. Nero's relationship with Dante and Vergil was inspired by mecha anime Itsuno watched.

Composer Casey Edwards said in a tweet that "Bury the Light", the character's theme song for Devil May Cry 5, was meant to be a reflection of "Devil Trigger" and that as "Nero chose to "embrace the darkness" and accept his demon side", Vergil instead "has always tried to bury his humanity as it is a great source of personal pain and memory of weakness". When Capcom first conceived Devil May Cry 5: Special Edition, the first upgrade for the game would have been the inclusion of Vergil as a playable character, with a new fighting style previously unseen.

=== Reboot inclusion ===
In the making of the reboot DmC: Devil May Cry by Ninja Theory, the Capcom team felt Ninja Theory appeared to like the original design of Vergil because he was mostly unchanged, unlike Dante. They found his personality colder-hearted because of his violent actions, such as killing demons. Itsuno enjoyed Vergil's personality and said across the story he became the Vergil from the original series because of his corrupted growth. Alex Jones from Ninja Theory said bringing Vergil into the story was necessary because it was meant to explain Dante's origins and affects Vergil's characterization because the characters are brothers. Despite making multiple changes to the original series, Jones refrained from mentioning them during an interview conducted before the release of the game. Vergil's agenda in the game is one of the main themes of the story; satire. Vergil works for an organization known as The Order, which attempts to rebel against the world portrayed in the game.

During the making of DmC, Ninja Theory aimed to give the player a co-op mode with Vergil assisting Dante but it did not make it to the game. As a result, the team decided to use Vergil as the single player character from the downloadable content Vergil's Downfall. He was decided to play more smooth than Dante despite sharing multiple similarities like the grappling hook both characters show in order to do platforming.

=== Voice actors ===
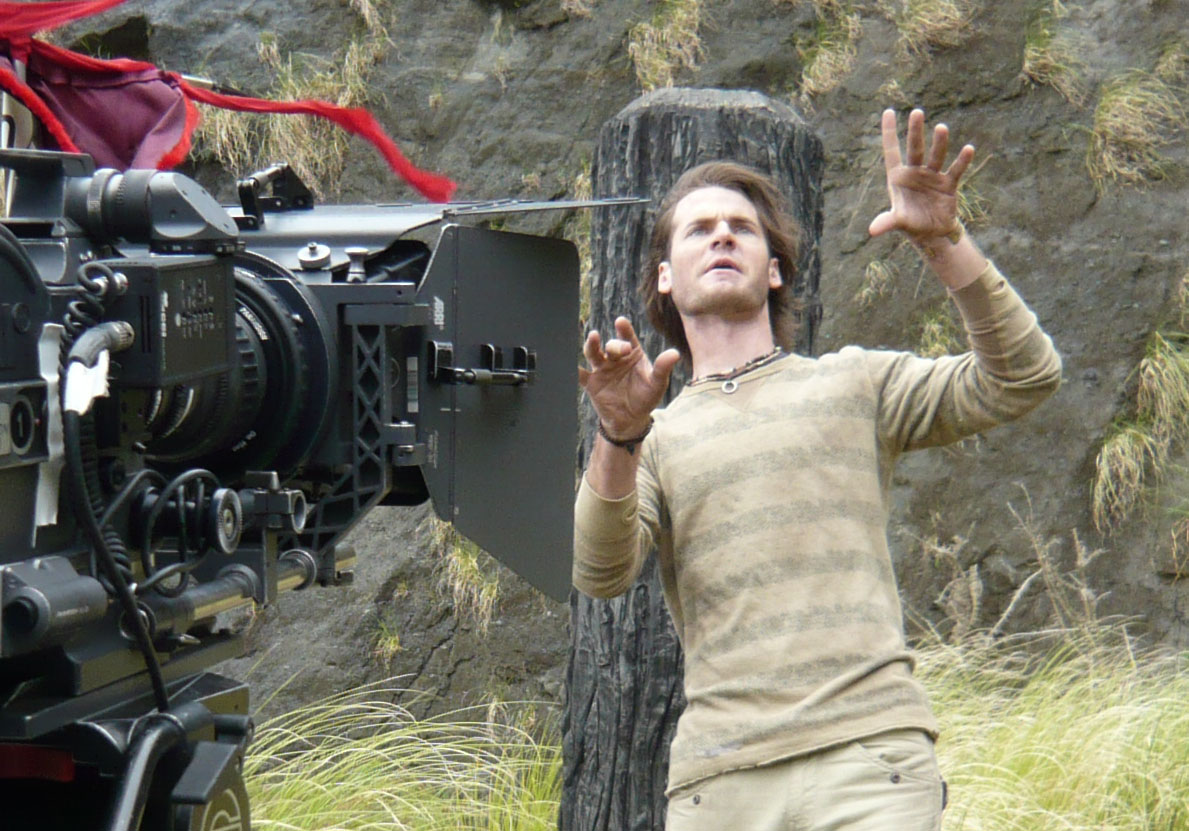
David de Lautor (pictured) voices him in the reboot, while Robbie Daymond (right) voices him in the Netflix series.

Although Nelo Angelo does not talk in Devil May Cry, the sounds he makes were made by David Keeley.

In Devil May Cry 3, Vergil was voiced by Daniel Southworth, who said he had been cast quickly and also performed the motion capture. Itsuno, who initially doubted the completion of Vergil's character, was surprised by Southworth's work and said, "it showed a respect for authentic Japanese swordsmanship, but balanced with a slightly rough, wild style that perfectly fit Vergil's profile of a Western man using a Japanese sword". When being cast to voice Vergil, Southworth was aware of the character's history and had a knowledge of samurai culture, which allowed him to give a good performance. According to the game's development staff, Southworth's knowledge about the samurai allowed him to fit well into Vergil's character in terms of voice and motion capture. When describing Vergil, Southworth stated that while he often appears to be calm, the audience would notice he shows signs of rage. Southworth found the motion-capturing the action scenes challenging and said these were his favorite parts of his work for the game. He said he was honored to repeat his work for the fighting game Ultimate Marvel vs. Capcom 3.

David de Lautour voiced Vergil in the reboot of the Devil May Cry series. De Lautour enjoyed finding out about Vergil's mannerisms and posture, labeling him a "great character".

Vergil was voiced in Japanese for the first time in Ultimate Marvel vs. Capcom 3. The voice actor Hiroaki Hirata was chosen by the developers of both Devil May Cry team and Ultimate Marvel vs. Capcom 3. Ryota Niitsuma, the producer of Ultimate Marvel vs. Capcom 3, and producer Hiroyuki Kobayashi found Hirata's voice suitable for Vergil.

Robbie Daymond voices the character in the Netflix series.

== Characteristics ==
Vergil is Dante's older twin brother; they are sons of a demon named Sparda and a human named Eva. Vergil is half-demon, which gives him superhuman abilities. He is more serious about his training than Dante. He has a cold, calm, and introverted demeanor, as opposed to Dante's arrogant, thrill-seeking, and outgoing nature. Both characters enjoy fighting; Vergil values the power gained from Sparda, without which he would be unable to protect anything. Vergil's main weapon is a katana named Yamato (閻魔刀), inherited from Sparda. As Nelo Angelo, Vergil wears black armor with a cape while using a wide, blue sword, retaining his sense of honor despite being a slave to Mundus's will.

== Appearances ==
Games featuring Vergil
2001	Devil May Cry
2002
2003
2004
2005	Devil May Cry 3: Dante's Awakening
2006	SNK vs. Capcom: Card Fighters DS
2006	Devil May Cry 3: Special Edition
2007
2008
2009
2010
2011	Ultimate Marvel vs. Capcom 3
2012	Project X Zone
2013	DmC: Devil May Cry
2014
2015	Devil May Cry 4: Special Edition
2015	DmC: Devil May Cry: Definitive Edition
2016	Project X Zone 2
2017
2018
2019	Devil May Cry 5
2019	Teppen
2020	Devil May Cry: Peak of Combat
2020	Devil May Cry 5: Special Edition

=== Devil May Cry main series ===
In the first Devil May Cry game, Vergil is said to have been separated from his family at the hands of the Demon King Mundus. He appears in the game as Nelo Angelo, a dark knight under Mundus's control who attacks Dante three times, with the third encounter revealing his identity. At the end of the game, Nelo Angelo appears to explode, leaving his half of an amulet his mother gave him and Dante as children behind.

Vergil plays a bigger role in Devil May Cry 3: Dante's Awakening, a prequel to the first game where he sought the power of his father, Sparda. Vergil allied himself with a man named Arkham and seeks Dante's amulet to use with his own to create a gate leading to the demon world. Vergil defeats Dante when he refuses to assist him and takes his brother's amulet, only to be betrayed as Arkham used the brothers' animosity for each while exploiting Lady's vendetta against him, in a scheme to take Sparda's power for himself. This convinces the brothers to set aside their differences in a temporary ceasefire to stop Arkham. Once the brothers defeat Arkham, Vergil remains in the Demon World after losing to Dante in a final duel. Soon after, Vergil encounters Mundus, and engages him in a fight leading to his conversion into Nelo Angelo. In the game's updated version Devil May Cry 3: Special Edition, Vergil is a playable character, playing the same missions as Dante. When playing as Vergil during missions that have him as a boss character, the player fights a red-clad version of Vergil.

In Devil May Cry 4, the Order of the Sword uses remains of Nelo Angelo to create the Alto and Bianco Angelos—artificial demons consisting of a suit of armor powered by a human or demon's soul. Vergil's sword Yamato ends up in the possession of Nero, who is Vergil's son. Vergil appears as a playable character in Devil May Cry 4: Special Edition, with his chapter taking place before the third game, including a scene of Vergil walking through Fortuna Island to investigate the traces his father Sparda left behind while fighting demons that have invaded the area, as well as the Order of the Sword's true intentions.

In Devil May Cry 5, Vergil finds Nero and rips his Devil Bringer arm off to reclaim the Yamato and use its power to heal himself. Vergil then returns to his childhood home in Red Grave City where he proceeds to use Yamato to purge his humanity from his being. This splits him into two beings: the full-blooded demon Urizen, who grows a Qliphoth Tree to eat its fruit and become king of the Underworld, and V, a frail man who enlists Dante and Nero to help him stop Urizen. After Dante defeats Urizen, V absorbs him and reconstitutes Vergil. Once whole, Vergil engages Dante in a duel to the death, but Nero, now revealed to be his son, intervenes. Following Vergil's defeat, he and Dante decide to leave to the underworld to cut the Qliphoth's roots to stop its growing, and use the Yamato to seal the portal to the underworld. Knowing it will leave them trapped, they entrust Nero to watch over the human world in their absence. After cutting Qliphoth's roots and sealing the portal, Dante and Vergil are shown fighting in the underworld, not as enemies, but as friendly rivals, while also fending off various waves of demons.

Vergil also appears in the Yunchang Games's 2020 mobile phone game Devil May Cry: Pinnacle of Combat, reprising his role from Devil May Cry 3.

=== DmC: Devil May Cry ===
In Ninja Theory's 2013 game, DmC: Devil May Cry, Vergil appears as the leader of The Order—a group of rogue vigilantes trying to free the world from demons. He takes Dante back to their childhood home to reveal their connection to each other and persuades him to contribute to the destruction of Mundus. While Vergil completes his part of the plan in the human world, he tasks Dante with battling his way through limbo. Eventually, Vergil uses the power of the Yamato to seal the Hell Gate and cut off Mundus' source of power. After defeating Mundus, he reveals his true intention: to rule the world with Dante. Vergil is fought as the final boss of the game. After being defeated, Vergil escapes through a portal. Vergil is also a playable character in DmC: Devil May Cry through the Vergil's Downfall DLC. The DLC takes place after the events of the main game; it follows Vergil's quest for power following his defeat. Vergil travels through Hell and replaces Mundus as the new Demon King.

=== Other appearances ===
In the novels by Shinya Goikeda, a mercenary resembling Vergil using the alias Gilver, is a tall man swathed in bandages. He becomes a partner of Dante as both hunt demons. In the novel's climax, however, Gilver confronts Dante in a duel and perishes. Gilver was once supposed to be Vergil; however, this has been retconned and Gilver is a demon resembling Vergil, made as a prototype for Nelo Angelo. In the second novel, Vergil appears as Nelo Angelo, leading a revolution against Mundus in an alternate dimension and allying with his brother. The Devil May Cry 3 manga by Suguro Chayamachi is set a year before the events of the game; Vergil is told by Arkham of a route to the demons' world and starts planning. In the Devil May Cry comics by Dreamwave Productions, Nelo Angelo chooses to serve under Mundus, stating his past self no longer exists. When facing Dante, however, he starts remembering his past and feeling conflicted about fighting him.

Vergil is also mentioned several times in the novel adaptation of Devil May Cry 4; Dante is often reminded of his brother when seeing Nero, but states that Vergil is dead. The light novel Devil May Cry 5 Before the Nightmare and the manga Visions of V explore the character's actions between his appearances. He is also the leading character in Guillaume Dorison's two-part comic series DmC: Devil May Cry: The Chronicles of Vergil, which follows Vergil and is set before the start of the reboot's story. The comic series tells the story of Vergil and Kat's meeting and their formation of the Order. Vergil is set to appear in the Devil May Cry TV series.

Vergil also appears as a playable character in the crossover fighting game Ultimate Marvel vs. Capcom 3. As with Devil May Cry 3: Special Edition, Vergil in Ultimate Marvel vs. Capcom 3 was designed to be played in a similar way to Dante, albeit with several differences to make both characters unique. He is also a character card in SNK vs. Capcom: Card Fighter DS. His Devil May Cry 3 outfit is available in the Capcom game Sengoku Basara 4 for Mitsunari Ishida. Vergil appears as a playable character in the tactical role-playing video game Project X Zone 2 with Dante as his partner. Nelo Angelo appears as a boss unit because the Vergil who partners with Dante is actually a time-displaced version of Vergil that originated before the Devil May Cry 3 event. Whether the time-displaced Vergil meets Nelo, his devil power is lingering because of Nelo's presence, although Vergil is not aware Nelo is his present self. In the Sengoku Basara vs. Devil May Cry stage show, Vergil was portrayed by Shōhei Namba and Tomokazu Yoshida portrayed Nelo Angelo.

In 2025, the hit Chinese mobile game, Punishing Gray Raven, Vergil is set to appear as a playable character for the collaboration event of the game, alongside Dante. Southworth reprised the role of Vergil.

== Reception ==
Vergil has been praised by video game publications, with his boss fight being described as the best among those in the series. His debut as Nelo Angelo was regarded as one of the best bosses of the Devil May Cry series; GamesRadar+. GamesRadar+ stated that Vergil and Dante share one of the best rivalries between brothers in gaming due to their differences. In 2008, IGN's Jesse Schedeen compared Vergil with Gray Fox from the Metal Gear series, writing that they are "two formidable warriors from the videogaming realm" who "met their unfortunate ends in the games". Engadget appreciated the prequel game Devil May Cry 3 for retroactively making Nelo Angelo a "more emotional villain" by introducing Dante's history with Vergil. Dante and Vergil's half demon nature has been examined in the context of religion.

Vergil's inclusion as a playable character in the updated version of Devil May Cry 3 was also the subject of discussion. PALGN appreciated that Vergil's moves are different from Dante's, making the former's scenario a different experience. He was also stated to be more powerful than Dante, which could either make a positive or negative impression on the player due to how playing as him lowered the game's difficulty. IGN's Jeremy Dunhan also praised Vergil's unique moves but criticized his balancing for reducing the challenge of the boss fights—one of the game's strong points. GameSpot said playing as Vergil was not as interesting as playing as Dante because Vergil begins the game with multiple abilities, leading to a lack of improvements during gameplay. GameSpot lamented that Vergil fought the same bosses as Dante and did not have his own story. GamesRadar+ listed him as one of the best unlockable characters in gaming because the abilities he can earn in battle, most notably his unlimited devil form.

In a GameSpy interview about Vergil's possible appearance in Devil May Cry 4, Hiroyuki Kobayashi's translator told him the interviewer was a fan of the character. Similarly, Gameplanet's reviewer Syed Mahir Hussain described Vergil's inclusion in Devil May Cry 4: Special Edition as one of the title's greatest strengths based on Vergil's "unique" fighting style. When giving the pros of the same game, GamesRadar+'s writer Tom Senior enjoyed "the way Vergil saunters casually through combat". Destructoid said elements of the reboot's version of Vergil were incorporated well into the regular Vergil. Hideaki Itsuno mentioned that Vergil's inclusion in any Special Edition had become a standard expectation from the fanbase.

Though not appearing in his full persona until the game's climax, Siliconera noted that Devil May Cry 5's setting was heavily influenced by him as his alteregos V and Urizen represent different sides of his personality while demons V has are taken from Nelo Angelo's persona from the original Devil May Cry game. Once V and Urizen merge and Vergil confronts his son Nero, he decides to redeem himself regardless of cost. Destructoid enjoyed the impact Vergil has on both Dante and Nero as both his brother and son become far more serious as they take it on themselves to stop the threat of their relative. USGamer found that while Vergil was too powerful in Devil May Cry 5 considering how he easily overpowers Dante and Nero as Urizen and criticized how his enemies reach his level without reason. He further criticized how his connection with Nero is not explored despite being father and son, respectively.

For the reboot of the series, Chris Carter of Destructoid wrote that Vergil was a more entertaining character than DmC: Devil May Cry's Dante, despite some problems he found with the character's gameplay. Dustin Chadwell of Gaming Age liked Vergil's gameplay, finding it superior to Dante's, but was confused by his storyline because of the lack of an explanation for his survival. GameSpot also appreciated Vergil's gameplay because of his departure from Dante's, despite finding it more challenging to play. Despite liking Vergil's moves, Kotaku stated that Vergil's story lacks the appeal of DmC because he does not face entertaining boss characters. When compared with rude but heroic Dante, Vergil's personality said to be initially charming only to be revealed to manipulative in reality. Despite their blood connection, Vergil shows little care for his brother in the reboot as he does not explain his actual desires until the game's ending where the two become are antagonistic to each other in a final fight. The reboot shows both siblings were contrasting clothing that help to distinguish each other based on their upbringings and personalities. Further analysis between the sons of Sparda led to the idea the two character might be archetype often explored in role-playing games.
