= One Piece Mansion =

2001 video game

- Developer: Capcom
- Publisher: Capcom
- Directors: Kei Shimo; Hideaki Itsuno
- Producer: Yoshihiro Sudou
- Designer: Satoshi Kubota
- Programmers: Hideo Sako; Tatsumi Kimoto; Yoshiyuki Nagata; Takashi Ogura
- Artist: Rin Kususaga
- Composer: Takayuki Aihara
- Platform: PlayStation
- Release: JP: June 21, 2001; NA: September 26, 2001; EU: November 16, 2001
- Genres: Puzzle, strategy
- Mode: Single-player

One Piece Mansion (ワンピースマンション, Wan Piisu Manshon) is a strategy video game that was developed and published by Capcom for the PlayStation in 2001.

== Plot ==
The storyline of One Piece Mansion revolves around a successful landlord called Polpo. At the start of the game, Polpo's little sister is kidnapped by the owner of a rival mansion, Chocola. It is the player's job to battle through levels meeting Chocola's objectives and to eventually free Polpo's little sister.

== Gameplay ==
The basic objective of One Piece Mansion is simple. Every resident in the player's mansion has a stress level, which is indicated by a small bar above their head. If this level gets too high, they will eventually move out of the mansion.

Every resident affects the stress levels of the residents around them, in both positive and negative ways. Each resident has a unique stress effect, some having negative to the left, positive to the right etc. The player's task is to arrange these so that all the residents are happy. However, if a resident does become stressed out, their effect on other residents changes. For example, sweet Ai-Chan radiates stress reducing arrows to all rooms around her. However, if she becomes stressed out herself, her effect on other residents weakens.

Polpo, the manager, also has a role to play in the game. In manager mode, he can roam around the mansion and perform two important tasks:

- Blow his whistle to send any Syndicate 5 members on that level back to their rooms.
- Use his fire extinguisher to put out any fires in the mansion.

=== Building ===
When the mansion becomes full, the player must build new rooms. If all the current levels are full, the player must also expand the mansion upwards with elevators. Building new rooms may also require demolishing elevators. Both construction and demolition require money.

== Game Modes ==
One Piece Mansion can be played in several different modes, each of which have their own unique challenges.

=== Story Mode ===
This is the mode in which the plot is followed. There are seven stages of increasing difficulty, with each stage requiring different conditions to be met.

Every few stages, a powerful rival character appears. The rival character will move into the player's mansion and kick out all the trouble residents, leaving the player to deal with him instead.

=== Endless Mode ===
In Endless Mode, players are left to develop their mansions without a plot line to follow. It allows players to experiment with new resident combinations and to expand the mansion as desired.

== Reception ==
Reception

Aggregate score
Aggregator	Score
Metacritic	62/100

Review scores
Publication	Score
AllGame	2/5
Computer and Video Games	6/10
Edge	6/10
Electronic Gaming Monthly	6.5/10
Game Informer	7.75/10
GamePro	3/5
GameRevolution	C
GameSpot	7.3/10
Official U.S. PlayStation Magazine	1.5/5
PlayStation: The Official Magazine	5/10

The game received "mixed" reviews according to video game review aggregator Metacritic.
