= Nero (Devil May Cry) =

- Devil May Cry character
- Nero as seen in Devil May Cry 5 (2019)
- First game: Devil May Cry 4 (2008)
- Created by: Bingo Morihashi
- Designed by: Tatsuya Yoshikawa
- Voiced by: EN: Johnny Yong Bosch (Devil May Cry 4 & 5); Joey Lem (Peak of Combat); JP: Kaito Ishikawa
- Motion capture: Johnny Yong Bosch

In-universe information
- Species: Half-Cambion
- Weapon: Red queen (sword) Blue Rose (revolver)
- Family: Vergil (father)
- Significant other: Kyrie
- Relatives: Dante (uncle); Sparda (grandfather); Eva (grandmother)

Nero (Japanese: ネロ) is a character in Devil May Cry, an action-adventure game series by Japanese developer and publisher Capcom. He is the nephew of original Devil May Cry protagonist Dante, and the son of recurring series antagonist Vergil. He first appeared in Devil May Cry 4 as the primary protagonist. Nero, a teenager who works for the Order of the Sword, uses demonic powers inherited from Sparda to hunt demons. Nero returns as the primary protagonist in Devil May Cry 5 to fight the demon king Urizen, a new threat. He has also appeared in printed media related to these two games. He is portrayed in voice acting and motion capture by Johnny Yong Bosch.

Nero was created by Bingo Morihashi and designed by Tatsuya Yoshikawa, who wanted to distinguish him from the veteran series protagonist Dante. Nero is voiced by Johnny Yong Bosch in English and Kaito Ishikawa in Japanese. Director Hideaki Itsuno aimed to make Nero stand out within the narrative despite being younger than most characters and thus would acquire new powers in the process.

Critical reception has been mainly positive; game journalists found that although fans would miss playing as Dante during Nero's debut, his personality and abilities would be equally appealing. His new look and actions in the sequel, Devil May Cry 5, have also been praised by critics that helped to distinguish him from the other playable characters.

== Creation and concept ==
Nero's Devil May Cry 4 appearance was ambiguous, resembling Sparda's twin sons.

Nero was created by the Capcom staff as a new protagonist who would develop across the Devil May Cry series because Dante had become stronger with each game. Originally a weak character, he develops new powers (primarily through his Devil Bringer ability) until he reaches Dante's level. Nero was also introduced to attract new gamers to the franchise. The Devil Bringer was originally intended to be part of Dante's mechanics, but the staff found that the games would be more interesting if a character who cannot transform into a demon develops a demonic arm. During their development, Capcom wanted to keep Nero's characteristics (except for Kyrie being his love interest) secret. Bingo Morihashi was inspired to write Nero's story by manga artist Ramo Nakajima in the Amagasaki City series: "I love you, so I protect the city you love". Love is the focus of the Devil May Cry series, and Devil May Cry 4 focuses on Nero's love for Kyrie. The staff were satisfied with Morihashi's simple story, similar to Hollywood films about a damsel in distress.

Fearing negative feedback similar to what followed the replacement of protagonist Solid Snake by newcomer Raiden in Konami's stealth game Metal Gear Solid 2: Sons of Liberty, producer Hiroyuki Kobayashi said that Capcom intended to make Nero fun to play compared with Dante and the team aimed to make him stronger. Kobayashi described Nero as "characteristically wild, quite immature, young, and very passionate ... kind of a rebel." Yuichiro Hiraki was one of the ones who came up with ideas for Nero's character based on notes from Kobayashi as the staff wanted the new game to feel more innovative. Hiraki wanted Nero to be a violent character as reflected on the way he handles swordsmanship. Hiraki consulted with director Hideaki Itsuno on other traits suitable for the new protagonist. Like in the first Devil May Cry, Hiraki worked with the two motion actors.

Capcom originally planned to name their new character after the French sculptor Auguste Rodin, who created The Gates of Hell from Dante Alighieri's Inferno, and the work makes demons spawn in the human world in Devil May Cry 4. However, the team later wanted a simpler name (similar to Dante and Vergil). Writer Morihashi Bingo persuaded the staff to use the name of the Roman emperor; according to Bingo, the similarities between Nero and the name of Vergil's alter ego (Nelo Angelo) were coincidental and there is no connection between the characters. Most of Nero's moves were named after casino terms, which Morihashi thought would suit the character's personality.

In Devil May Cry 5, Nero's gameplay emphasizes his anger at how Dante first treats him. The game's climax, where Nero awakens his demonic powers and ends the struggle between Dante and Vergil, was meant to give the story depth. Nero's new powers' availability near the game's end intended to enhance its replay value and emphasize the power Nero needs to face Vergil; he could not defeat his alter ego, Urizen, at the beginning of the game. Itsuno claimed that while Dante and V get power ups in Devil May Cry 5 during mid areas of the game, which he finds common in gaming, he wanted Nero to awake these powers for the final fight. Nero's relationship with Dante and Vergil was inspired by a mecha anime Itsuno watched as a child. Vergil was based on the protagonist's missing father who makes a sudden appearance with a giant robot that targets his family: Nero and Dante.

=== Design ===
Nero was designed by Tatsuya Yoshikawa, who researched the entire Devil May Cry series. Yoshikawa was satisfied with Nero's appearance, believing that he fits the series' world. Nero's appearance underwent several changes during the development of Devil May Cry 4; although early designs looked more like Vergil, the final design resembled Dante. Capcom wanted to balance the traits of Nero and Dante, the game's two playable characters. Nero was created to be weak due to his youth, and Dante seems more experienced; existing fans would prefer playing Dante. Capcom had planned another Devil May Cry game, in which Nero would return and might team up with Dante, but first wanted to see fan response to Devil May Cry 4.

Yoshikawa also created the Devil Trigger (魔人化), another devil transformation, for Nero. Unlike Dante's transformation (which makes him look like a devil), Nero's Devil Trigger generates a creature behind his back. One prototype (which did not appear in the game) turned Nero into a demon like Dante, with his hood covering one eye.

Nero's redesign for Devil May Cry 5 was intended to contrast with Dante's older look. Since Nero's name means "black" in Italian, he was given black clothing. Capcom used an older incarnation of Nero, so he would be "at the top of his game in body and mind". Because the game's graphics are meant to be as realistic as possible, Nero's face was modeled on actor Karlo Baker. Fans wondered if Nero was related to Dante or Vergil, as in Devil May Cry 4, Nero is said to be a descendant of Sparda (Dante and Vergil's father) based on their similarities and the Devil Trigger, Nero's power-up which makes him resemble Vergil's devil form. In June 2018, Capcom said that Nero is Vergil's son. Capcom replaced Nero's Devil Bringer with the Devil Breaker, a prosthetic arm useful in combat. Purchasers of the Devil May Cry 5 deluxe edition received four Devil Breaker weapons for Nero, including a Mega Buster based on Mega Man 11.

=== Voice actors ===
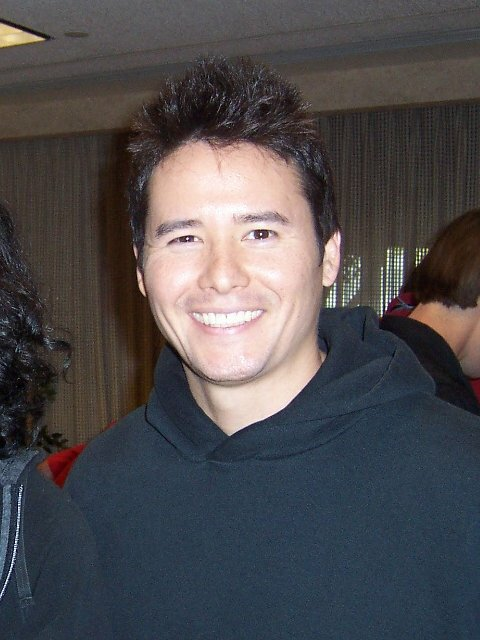
Johnny Yong Bosch voiced Nero.

Nero was voiced by Johnny Yong Bosch, who enjoyed playing Ichigo Kurosaki from Bleach and Vash the Stampede from Trigun but considers Nero his favorite. He went to Japan to do the character's motion capture. Before his debut, Bosch was familiar with the series, having played the first Devil May Cry. While he enjoyed Dante's character, he wanted Nero to be different personality wise despite his similar physical appearances. As a result, he considers Nero as a character he relates due to how close he was to the role. Bosch is also in charge of doing the motion capture which he originally challenging back in his debut due to some over the top actions the stunt had to make. The voiceover had to be redone during the making of the game. Although Devil May Cry 5 is a sequel, Bosch did three auditions to reprise his roles due to the large time the game took to be made. In regards to Nero's bloodline, Bosch found that Devil May Cry 4 made it obvious that Nero was Vergil's son but still look forward to how their relationship would be explored in the sequel.

In the Japanese version of Devil May Cry 4: Special Edition (an updated version of Devil May Cry 4), Nero was voiced by Kaito Ishikawa. Although Ishikawa tried to follow Bosch's work when dubbing the character to understand Nero's personality, he found it difficult because he did not know English. He had no previous experience with the series before working on Special Edition, but was encouraged by his friends. Ishikawa met Dante's Japanese voice actor, Toshiyuki Morikawa, during recording; they interacted many times, and Morikawa helped him understand the franchise. Ishikawa understood the game better as he worked because it was translated into Japanese (which might attract more fans), and he appreciated the experience.

He described Nero as a character who encompasses the universal "naughty young boy". Nero's interactions with enemies differ significantly from Dante's, and Ishikawa believed that Nero is taking his own path rather than following Dante's. He enjoyed the relationship between the two characters, which he brought into recording the game. Nero tries to act stylishly when facing his enemies (unlike Dante), and Ishikawa noted Morikawa's work.

== Appearances ==
In the fourth installment of the Devil May Cry series, Nero is injured protecting his childhood friend Kyrie from a pack of demons. At a later mass at the Order of the Sword, Nero's injured arm becomes the Devil Bringer when Kyrie is endangered. With a lone-wolf reputation, Nero is given a mission to find and capture Dante. He learns that the influx of demons on the island was arranged by Sanctus, who was resurrected as a demon by Order scientist Agnus. Nero is revealed as Sparda's descendant, convincing Sanctus to use Kyrie as bait to force Nero to assume the role he intended for Dante. Dante sabotages Sanctus's plans, freeing Nero so he can save Kyrie and destroy Sanctus and the Savior. Nero parts on good terms with Dante, who convinces him to keep Yamato.

A Devil May Cry 4 novel by Bingo Morihashi expands Nero's background. Found as an infant in Fortuna, he is bullied by other children who call his mother a prostitute. Nero is taken in by Credo and Kyrie's family and later joins the Order of the Sword, often working alone to defeat demons. Dante says that he has fun with Nero because he reminds him of his brother, Vergil, although he cannot understand why.

In Devil May Cry 5, Nero has started a mobile branch of Dante's Devil May Cry business to provide for Kyrie and working with Agnus' daughter Nico. His life is uprooted when a mysterious figure rips his Devil Bringer arm off for the Yamato. Nero is outfitted with the prosthetic Devil Breaker arm and pursues the figure to Red Grave City, where he rejoins Dante and meets the mysterious V. It is revealed that V and Urizen are splintered halves of Vergil, who took Nero's arm and is his father. Nero decides to stop the brothers' fight, and overpowers Vergil with his awakened Devil Trigger. This convinces Dante and Vergil to entrust him with the world's safety, and they trap themselves in the Underworld to destroy the Qliphoth and end the chaos caused by Urizen. The light novel Devil May Cry 5 Before the Nightmare explores the character's actions between his appearances.

Nero was scheduled to appear in the fighting game Tatsunoko vs. Capcom, but did not due to time constraints. He is mentioned in Marvel vs. Capcom 3 by Deadpool, interacting with Dante. In Ultimate Marvel vs. Capcom 3, Vergil has a color scheme based on Nero in DMC4. In Street Fighter V, Nero is an alternate design for Ed. Nero was added to Teppen as a playable character in October 2019 as part of its "The Devils Awaken" expansion, he was initially announced during the 2019 Tokyo Game Show.

== Reception ==
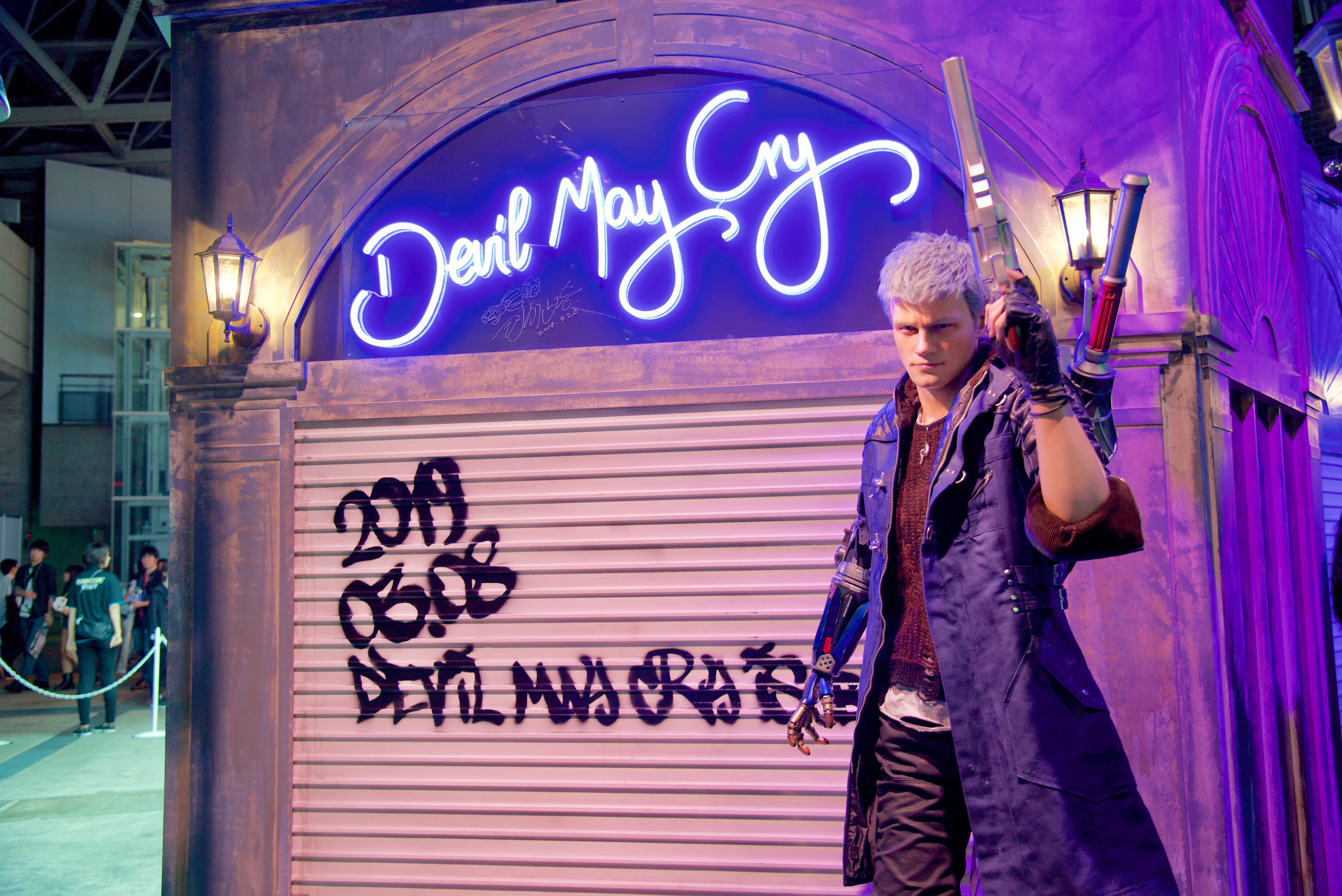
A statue of Nero, used to promote Devil May Cry 5

Nero has received mainly-positive reviews from video-game critics. Since his introduction in a game demo, a GameSpot reviewer felt that the character would appeal to series fans (although Dante remained more popular). Dante's replacement with Nero as the new main character was controversial; a GameAxis Unwired reviewer expected him to play similarly to Dante, and his Devil Bringer would satisfy newcomers. Nero's gameplay style was praised by IGN, which said that he "strike[s] the right tone of gravity and sarcasm". Capsulecomputers.com called Nero "our anti-hero with a heart", and enjoyed the character's mechanics as much as Dante's. Finding Nero a likable character, a GameSpot reviewer said that players would be pleased with the switch between Nero and Dante as Devil May Cry 4 progressed. Den of Geek noted that although Nero's debut might have surprised fans of Dante, his combined similar appearance and distinctive style might appeal to them. GameSpy described his combat: "He has a fuel injector built in, so that he can 'rev' up his blade for charged attacks".

USgamer noted that despite Nero's being one of Special Edition's easiest characters to use, his combat still provided depth and defeating the bosses was more challenging with Nero than with Dante. Noting the similarities between Nero and Dante, Metro said that Nero's other skills (his swordsmanship and the Devil Bringer) made him unique. IGN ranked the Devil Bringer the ninth-best weapon in the Devil May Cry series, since Nero could attack any type of enemy with his arm. A Dual Shockers reviewer enjoyed Nero's combat, which added depth to the series because it differed from Dante's. The website, however, found Nero's story unappealing.

Capcom said that it would not make a bad protagonist like that in Metal Gear Solid 2. GameZone found Nero's actions and powers likable. Game Informer agreed with GameZone that Nero is as likable as Dante because he "lives up to his legacy". Edge was critical of his replacement of Dante, comparing Nero to the unlikable God of War protagonist Kratos. Although it found Nero's improvements in abilities less enjoyable, Edge said that players would find Dante more appealing as the story progressed. In his book, 1001 Video Games You Must Play Before You Die, Tony Mott wrote that the change to Nero from Dante was an appeal to new arrivals at the franchise. Nero performed simpler moves than Dante, with whom players might have become bored; sales of the series were falling. Mott's book called Nero a "dead ringer", with moves similar to those of Kratos. Bosch's portrayal of Nero in the English-language version was praised by GameZone; GameSpot agreed, saying that Bosch's "superb acting makes for one of the most appealing new game characters to be introduced in some time".

Reaction to Nero's role in Devil May Cry 5 has been mainly positive. GamesRadar found his engagement of demons in the Devil May Cry 5 trailer appealing. Metro also enjoyed his actions in the trailer and joked about Nero's new look, while VG247 found him too different from his Devil May Cry 4 persona. IGN criticized Nero's appearance in Devil May Cry 5, comparing it and the redesigned version of Dante by Ninja Theory as a failed attempt to appeal to gamers during the 2018 Electronic Entertainment Expo. According to Capcom's Michiteru Okabe, gamer response to Nero's new appearance was positive. Despite a confusing scene in the trailer in which Vergil apparently cuts Nero's arm, Kotaku looked forward to the return of the main characters Dante, Vergil and Nero. Another Kokatu writer praised Nero's new costume and his metallic arm. Destructoid liked Vergil's impact on Dante and Nero as his brother and son take it upon themselves to halt the threat to their relative. USgamer compared Dante's relationship with Nero to that of father and son, but found Dante's treatment of the younger demon hunter mean-spirited (although Dante later does not want Nero to face Vergil because of their actual father-son relationship). In promoting Devil May Cry 5, Capcom produced replicas of the character's jacket as limited editions for Japanese gamers. GameSpot noted how engaging Nero is to newcomers thanks to his gameplay. IGN liked Nero's new techniques provided by his mechanical arms—most notably the one he shoots to attack enemies. EndGadget found Nero as a worthy Devil May Cry fighter due to his visual appeal and the uniqueness in his movesets.

In an analysis of Devil May Cry 5, Nero was praised by the site PlayStation Life as Hideaki Itsuno's best character as the already the most famous protagonist, Dante, is actually Hideki Kamiya's creation which Itsuno reinterpreted in a different style starting Devil May Cry 3. Nero's personality and gameplay highly differs from Dante's in both Devil May Cry 4 and Devil May Cry 5 with Dante being more stylish and superior to Nero. However, in the climax, the writer felt that Nero became more appealing than the other protagonists when reveals his new demon powers to stop the brother fight and gives him a strong connection with his uncle.
