= Sarah Lafleur =

Canadian actress

- Occupation: Actress
- Years active: 1995–present
- Website: sarahlafleur.com

Sarah Lafleur is a Canadian actress, most recognizable for her roles in Ugly Betty (ABC), The Mentalist (CBS), Grey's Anatomy (ABC), CSI: NY (CBS), Crossing Jordan (NBC), Without a Trace (CBS), Playmakers (ESPN); and the films Shall We Dance? (Miramax), Master Spy: The Robert Hanssen Story (CBS) and Daydream Believers: The Monkees Story (VH1). She also narrated several seasons of My Fair Wedding with David Tutera (WEtv), but is Best Known as the Original voice of Sailor Uranus for the first English Dub of Sailor Moon, Ansa from Land Lock, and the first English voice behind Trish in Devil May Cry. Lafleur was part of the year 2000 cast of History Bites (History Channel) nominated for a Gemini Award in the Best Performance by an Ensemble Cast in a Music, Variety Program category.

Her most recent credit was in 2015 when she was last seen on an episode of Bones.

== Filmography ==
Film Credits
Year	Title	Role	Notes
2000	Sex & Mrs. X	Maid	TV movie
2000	Daydream Believers: The Monkees' Story	Carla	TV movie
2000	Who Killed Atlanta's Children?	Spin Secretary	TV movie
2001	You Might Be The Youngest	Laura	Short
2001	Jackie, Ethel, Joan: The Women of Camelot	Marilyn Monroe	TV movie
2002	Pretend You Don't See Her	Fitness Center Receptionist	TV movie
2002	Blocked	Ideal Woman	
2002	Terminal Invasion	Sarah Philips	
2002	Master Spy: The Robert Hanssen Story	Kimberly Lichtenberg	TV movie
2004	Shall We Dance?	Carolyn	
2007	Lake Placid 2	Emma Warner	TV movie
2010	Taylor Warren	Taylor Warren	Short / Best Actress Nominee - 2010 AOF Int'l Film Festival

Television Credits
Year	Title	Role	Notes
1998	History Bites	Various Roles	3 episodes Best Performance Nominee - Gemini Award
1998	PSI Factor: Chronicles of the Paranormal	Female Cop	Episode: "Plimpsest"
1999	Total Recall 2070	Marge	Episode: "Bones Beneath My Skin"
2000	The City	Jen	2 episodes
2000	Traders	Emily Nelson	Episode: "Someone to Watch Over Me"
2000	The Famous Jett Jackson	Darien	Episode: "What You Wish For"
2000	Wind at My Back	Woman #1	Episode: "Oh Happy Day"
2001	Twice in a Lifetime	Sevarina Rosetti	Episode: "Mama Mia"
2001	Earth: Final Conflict	Dr. Andrea Mazar / Emma King / Sarah Boone	2 episodes
2002	The Eleventh Hour	Angela Kieran	Episode: "Tree Hugger"
2003	Sue Thomas: F.B.Eye	Nora Albright	Episode: "Girl Who Signed Wolf"
2003	Playmakers	Beth Havens	3 episodes
2005	CSI: NY	Paige Worthy	Episode: "Blood, Sweat and Tears"
2005	Night Stalker	Trish Medlock	Episode: "Pilot"
2005	Sex, Love & Secrets	Marjorie	2 episodes
2006	The Unit	Mrs. Johnson	Episode: "Security"
2006	Grey's Anatomy	Melanie Reynolds	Episode: "Damage Case"
2006	Our Thirties	Emily	TV short
2007	Without A Trace	Valerie Sharp	Episode: "Eating Away"
2007	Crossing Jordan	Julie	Episode: "In Sickness & in Health"
2008–2009	Ugly Betty	Molly Meade	16 episodes
2008	Glendale Metro	Detective Maria Fantozzi	Episode: "Pilot"
2008	The Mentalist	Emily Nelson	Episode: "Red Brick and Ivy"
2011	Prime Suspect	Oona Timoney	Episode: "Wednesday's Child"
2011	Rizzoli & Isles	Debby Nichols Tibbet	Episode: "Seventeen Ain't So Sweet"
2014	CSI: Crime Scene Investigation	Jenny Carroll	Episode: "Killer Moves"
2014	Major Crimes	Lisa Kemp	Episode: "Leap of Fate"
2015	Criminal Minds	Brenda Archer	Episode: "Hero Worship"
2015	NCIS: Los Angeles	Kate Ramsay	Episode: "An Unlocked Mind"
2015	Bones	Fanny Nicholson	Episode: "The Cowboy in the Contest"

Voice Credits
Year	Title	Role	Notes
1995	Landlock	Ansa	Animated Feature (English Dub)
1995, 2000	Sailor Moon S	Amara Tenoh / Sailor Uranus, Additional Voices	TV series (English Dub)
2000	Sailor Moon S the Movie: Hearts in Ice	Amara Tenoh / Sailor Uranus	Animated Feature (English Dub)
2000	Sailor Moon SuperS the Movie: Black Dream Hole	Amara Tenoh / Sailor Uranus	Animated Feature (English Dub)
2001	Devil May Cry	Trish / Eva	Video game
2005	Viewtiful Joe: Red Hot Rumble	Trish	Video game
2008–2013	David Tutera's CELEBrations	Narrator	TV series

Preceded by None	Voice of Sailor Uranus; 2000	Succeeded by Erica Mendez
