= Bingo Morihashi =

Japanese novelist

- 森橋 ビンゴ
- Born: March 2, 1979 (age 47); Hiroshima, Japan
- Education: Osaka University of Arts
- Occupation: Novelist
- Years active: 2002–present

Bingo Morihashi (森橋 ビンゴ) is a Japanese novelist. He also contributed to writing the video game franchise Devil May Cry, its television anime series, as well as two light novels based on it.

== Career ==
Morihashi published his first series named Tokyo Shimatsumou which was divided in two volumes. During the making of the second volume, Morihashi was hired by Capcom to get assistance with the video game Devil May Cry 2. Due to being one of the newest members from the team, Morihashi did minor works such as overseeing the translation and instruction manual among others. Nevertheless, he found working in the video game was too stressing due to the major overhaul it had once director Hideaki Itsuno took over completion of the title.

Shortly after the release of Devil May Cry 2, Itsuno decided the staff should develop a new video game, Devil May Cry 3: Dante's Awakening. Morihashi was once again employed but this time took a bigger role during game development. As he had not experienced doing planning, he was given the role of writing the scenario. The game's main character, Dante, was given a different characterization than in the first Devil May Cry due to his original creator, Hideki Kamiya, not being involved within the project. While feeling his own take on the character did not equal the popularity of the original one, Morihashi enjoyed Dante's role in the game. Besides Dante, Morihashi felt challenging the making of Vergil due to how he had no prior design, yet he still had to come up with an entire new one for the artists.

Unlike Devil May Cry 2, the latest game was a commercial and critical success which led Itsuno to start a project for another title from the series, Devil May Cry 4. Morihashi found problems with the making of this game because he felt the writers did not collaborate well together to the point Morihashi stated he had problems having contact with any of them. Once finishing the scenario, Morihashi quit Capcom. However, requests for help from Itsuno resulted in Morihashi returning to company for one year. Morihashi created the new main character, Nero, alongside other Capcom members in order to give the gamers an appealing character considering Dante achieved high popularity in the previous games.

After leaving Capcom, Morihashi teamed up with Yasui Kentarou to write the novels Devil May Cry 4: Deadly Fortune. Divided in two volumes, the novels were published in 2009. In the afterword, Bingo wrote that these removed scenes were intended to be included in the game but were not due to some production reasons. Nevertheless, certain scenes like Nero inheriting the Devil May Cry hunting job from Dante were later referenced by Itsuno in 2018 during the making of Devil May Cry 5 as well Vergil appearing in Fortuna during the updated version of Devil May Cry 4.

Following multiple books, Hideki Kamiya contacted Morihashi to aid the PlatinumGames staff to develop the video game Bayonetta 2 believing he was skilled based on his previous works.

As part of the promotion for Devil May Cry 5 Morihashi would later write Devil May Cry 5 -Before the Nightmare-, a novel set before the events of the game.

== Works ==
- Devil May Cry 2 (2003) – Planner
- Devil May Cry 3 (2005) – Scenario writer
- Devil May Cry 4 (2008) – Scenario writer
- BlazBlue: Calamity Trigger (2010) – Scenario writer
- 7th Dragon 2020 (2011) – Scenario writer
- Dragon's Dogma (2012) – Scenario writer
- Bayonetta 2 (2014) – Scenario support
- Fairy Fencer F: Advent Dark Force (2016) – Scenario support
- Devil May Cry 5 (2019) – Scenario writer
- Dragon's Dogma 2 (2024) – Scenario writer
