= Devil May Cry 2 =

2003 video game

- North American PlayStation 2 box art
- Developer: Capcom Production Studio 1
- Publisher: Capcom
- Director: Hideaki Itsuno (Note: Last 6 months of development. Replacing an uncredited director.)
- Producers: Tsuyoshi Tanaka; Katsuhiro Sudo
- Writers: Katsuya Akitomo; Masashi Takimoto; Shusaku Matsukawa
- Composers: Masato Kouda; Tetsuya Shibata; Satoshi Ise
- Series: Devil May Cry
- Platforms: PlayStation 2; PlayStation 3; Xbox 360; PlayStation 4; Windows; Xbox One; Nintendo Switch
- Release: January 28, 2003: PlayStation 2; NA: January 28, 2003; JP: January 30, 2003; EU: March 28, 2003 Nintendo Switch; WW: September 19, 2019; HD Collection; PlayStation 3, Xbox 360; JP: March 22, 2012; NA: March 29, 2012; EU: April 3, 2012; AU: April 5, 2012 PS4, Windows, Xbox One; WW: March 13, 2018
- Genres: Action-adventure, hack and slash
- Mode: Single-player

Devil May Cry 2 (Note: Japanese: デビル メイ クライ2, Hepburn: Debiru Mei Kurai Tsū) is a 2003 action-adventure game developed and published by Capcom for the PlayStation 2. In terms of chronological order, the game's events are set after Devil May Cry and Devil May Cry: The Animated Series and prior to Devil May Cry 4.

Set in modern times, in the fictional Vie de Marli island, the story centers on demon hunter Dante and island guardian Lucia in their fight to stop a businessman named Arius from raising the demon Argosax and achieving supreme power. The story is told primarily through a mixture of cutscenes using the game engine, with several pre-rendered full motion videos.

Handled by a different team that lacked experience, Devil May Cry 2 had a troubled production which was reflected in its reception. The game received mixed reviews and has been criticized for a variety of decisions, which made it considerably different from its predecessor; chief among these were the lowered difficulty and changes to Dante's personality. Despite that, Devil May Cry 2 was a commercial success, established a number of series conventions, and motivated its development team to improve their work, staying with the franchise for future entries.

== Gameplay ==
In-game screenshot showing Dante swinging his sword, Rebellion, towards a Goatling

In Devil May Cry 2, the player guides either Dante or Lucia through a number of environments, fighting groups of monsters in fast-paced combat. The game consists of missions with specific goals in the play area of the game itself. The player's performance in each mission is ranked from D (poor/"Don't Worry") to S (excellent/"Showtime") based on the time taken to complete the mission, the amount of Red Orbs collected, the overall "style" displayed during fights, item usage, and damage taken. In contrast to the rest of the gameplay, the style judging system used in the game has been cited as being the harshest in terms of how it judges the player's performance.

Combat itself is based on the "style" the player demonstrates during a fight. The rating the player gains for style is improved by hitting enemies continuously while avoiding damage. This ranges from "Don't Worry", progressing to "Come On!", "Bingo", "Are You Ready?" and peaking at "Showtime". If the character takes damage, the style rating falls back to "Don't Worry".

The game's controls convert short sequences of button presses into complex on-screen actions. New to the series is an evasion button, which allows Dante or Lucia to roll, dodge enemy attacks, or run along walls. Another new feature is a weapon-change button, which allows the player to cycle through ranged weapons without switching to the inventory screen.

The game also features puzzle-solving and exploration elements. Gameplay involves the player examining their surroundings to find items and orbs. Red Orbs are used to acquire new combat powers and abilities for the characters. These Red Orbs are "the blood of demons"; enemies drop them when they are defeated. Dante and Lucia can also purchase items, which allow them to restore their damaged health or even instantly revive should they be killed by an enemy's attack.

The Devil Trigger ability enables Dante and Lucia to transform into a demon form. This changes their appearance, increases their strength and defense, slowly restores health, and enables them to use special attacks and other passive and movement abilities, including increased speed and the power to fly. The Devil Trigger state lasts as long as there is power in the Devil Trigger Gauge, which increases by attacking or taunting enemies in the normal state and decreases by attacking in the Devil Trigger state or using Devil Trigger-only attacks. Unique to this game is the Desperation Devil Trigger—an enhanced form of the Devil Trigger—available to Dante when he is low on health.

Players can also use Trish after beating the Hard Mode with Dante. Trish's gameplay is heavily different than Dante, while retaining some of his moves, but she has her own gimmick of her sword combat. Trish can also switch between Sword of Sparda and a hand-to-hand combat. Unlike Dante and Lucia, Trish uses a power-up aura for her "Devil Trigger".

== Plot ==
At a museum, an item on display called the Medaglia attracts Lucia, a gaggle of demons and Dante. After defeating their foes, Lucia invites Dante to her homeland. An island existing outside the mainstream in the outskirts of the New World, Vie de Marli became a sanctuary for refugees of different races, beliefs and languages; as well as runaway slaves; in the distant past. Despite different cultural roots, all belonged to sects of the same ancient religion—which originated in the Mediterranean then spread to neighboring regions—and were branded as heretics in their places of origin. Over time, these groups blended into one, the syncretism leading to new religions that worshipped demons. For divine conflicts, the people called for protection by the priests of their cults, who were known as "guardians".

At Vie de Marli, Dante meets another one, Lucia's mother Matier who, centuries earlier, exorcised Argosax (the evilest idolized demon) with the aid of his father, Sparda. She asks Dante to fight Arius, an international businessman whose Uroboros Corporation installed itself on the island. Outwardly interested in "special ores" found there and developing the place, his true intent is to transcend mortality by absorbing Argosax's power after summoning the demon with Arcanas, holy relics hidden throughout Vie de Marli. Dante flips a coin in answer, and decides to help when the coin lands on heads. He heads off to exterminate demons and find Arius, while Lucia collects the Arcanas.

Both fighters spot and chase a Uroboros helicopter flying from headquarters towards an oil platform. Lucia reaches it first and faces Arius, who reveals her origin as his rejected artificial creation. He claims that she is bound to turn on humans someday, then warps her away. Shortly afterward, Dante meets up with Lucia, who gives him the last of the Arcana and leaves. She infiltrates the Uroboros tower to kill Arius, but fails and is held hostage. Dante then encounters Matier, who asks him to take the Arcanas to save Lucia. Dante flips the coin again to decide if he will help; it lands on heads, and he departs to aid Lucia. Dante arrives and trades the Arcana for Lucia, then attacks Arius. To escape, Arius forces Dante to decide between saving Lucia or killing him.

Lucia, worried about the ritual and conflicted about herself, wonders how they will stop Arius. Dante waves her off, stating he will find a way. Dante leaves Lucia to think as he departs to defeat Arius. Matier arrives a short time later, reaffirms their mother-daughter bond as stronger than blood ties, and persuades her to rejoin the fight against Arius. Dante arrives at the tower to find Arius in the middle of his immortality-inducing ritual. However, Dante is not worried as he switched the Medaglia with a non-sacred coin. Another fight ensues, in which Dante finishes Arius off with his pistols. Outside, Lucia confronts Dante and demands that he kill her because she fears she will become a demon herself. Before the issue can be resolved, a large stream of energy strikes the tower and a portal to the demon world is opened. Dante and Lucia argue over who will enter and close it from the inside; Dante offers to leave the issue up to fate. He flips the coin and it once again lands on heads, leaving Dante to enter the portal to deal with the partially summoned Argosax, after leaving the coin with Lucia.

After Dante departs, Arius returns to life bearing demonic power. While Lucia fights Arius, he finds himself injured and attempts to distract her, a tactic which fails, and Lucia goes on to defeat him. Within the portal, Dante fights and defeats Argosax. Finding the portal closed behind him, Dante instead drives further into the demon realm on a motorcycle. In the aftermath of the battle, Matier attempts to reassure Lucia about Dante's fate, insisting that Sparda returned from a similar trip. Lucia examines the coin Dante left with her and discovers that both sides are identical. Sometime later, in Dante's shop, Lucia muses about Dante. Outside the sound of a motorcycle echoes, and Lucia leaves to investigate. The player is not shown whether or not Dante has returned.

== Development ==
=== Background ===
Throughout the turn of the millennium, Team Little Devils—a group within Capcom Production Studio 4 helmed by Hideki Kamiya, who previously lead the successful Resident Evil 2—developed Devil May Cry. As production on that title wound down in the summer of 2001, company management greenlit a sequel, to be made by the arcade-centric Capcom Production Studio 1, for release soon after the original to capitalize on its high awareness and popularity.

The first director of Team Devil was a planner who had worked under Studio 1 General Manager Noritaka Funamizu. That crew ultimately contained many people who had mostly worked on fighting games, as well as some Team Little Devils members, and industry newcomers like producer Tsuyoshi Tanaka and planner Bingo Morihashi, totalling around 40 to 50 developers. Kamiya believes the change happened due to a lack of consciousness over directors' influence on game style, and an attempt to balance profits due to a company attitude against concentrating major titles in a single division.

Capcom management at the time was disappointed with the financial performance of Studio 1's output, the change of teams for Devil May Cry 2 part of a pivot reflecting industry trends. Daigo Ikeno—a former Studio 1 member hired to join Team Devil for character, monster and stage design as a contract worker—described the situation thus:

"Capcom had traditionally been split into two main pillars: the arcade division and the console division. But the PS2's increased processing power and a change in the nature of Capcom's arcade game market meant a company-wide shift of human resources from arcade to console. With the company's big hits at the time, like Resident Evil and DMC, many of the arcade fighting game teams were switched over to teams making games for home consoles. These former arcade division employees were put in charge of the DMC sequels."

Studio 4 General Manager Shinji Mikami agreed to the switch due to headcount: the game would require a large crew, but he wanted the freedom to work on multiple titles, and felt Kamiya lacked experience working with small teams, assigning him to what became Viewtiful Joe. While working on the localization and finishing touches of Devil May Cry, Kamiya first heard about the sequel from its original director, who asked him to share that game's screenplay and design document so they could develop the sequel. Since Mikami didn't inform him of the change, and both his directorial efforts faced partial reboots and delays, Kamiya at first thought it was a sign of an imminent firing. Team Devil would communicate regularly with Team Little Devils members for feedback on their work.

=== Production ===
Devil May Cry 2 was conceived as happening 10 years after the events of the original. Since a producer didn't like the "joke-cracking wiseass" Dante of Devil May Cry, he was re-envisioned as grown-up and taciturn. Morihashi believes the game's story was outsourced to a non-company writer. Katsuya Akitomo, a veteran of both Studio 1 and the series, (Note: Akitomo's past work included the writing and supervising of X-Men: Children of the Atom and Marvel Super Heroes, as well as the fiction section of the Devil May Cry manual.) was asked to make Dante's lines and behavior in a tentative screenplay funnier, as he was found to be too serious. Morihashi—who juggled his Capcom job with a career as a professional novelist—only made small dialogue augmentations and wrote subtitles, cautious of limits due to newness. By the point he got to work on its writing, the script was in the translation process, while bosses and stages were already done. So when the finalized scenario was submitted, he was asked to not make big changes.

The game's entire cast has few lines of dialogue and never takes drastic action. To Ikeno, "[Dante's] sudden silence almost seemed to imply that something terrible had happened between the events of 1 and 2". Both Ikeno and Morihashi feel the lack of any warm moments from Lucia hurt her likeability, the latter also thinking the same of Matier. Multiple Team Devil members were fond of Arius because "it was neat to have a CEO as a villain"; as "a symbol of high contemporary culture", he became the precedent that allowed writing opportunities in sequels beyond the "fantasy world" setting of the original. To Morihashi, who sees "love" as the central theme of the series, Devil May Cry 2 "is about Dante's love for his father. He follows in his father's footsteps by protecting something that his father once protected".

Ikeno sees the series' visual style as aligned with action-packed Hollywood B movies, as such approaching it like a live-action adaptation of a comic book. He made the main cast's wardrobe aiming for clothing that real people would wear. The new characters' designs were made to complement and contrast Dante's, with Lucia's also working as a counterpoint to Trish's design while fitting a Capcom tradition of prioritizing fighting ability over attractiveness in female characters. Arius' face is an homage to Colonel Douglas Mortimer, a character played by Lee Van Cleef in For a Few Dollars More; his noble look and palette "imply that he's compensating for a deep, dark evil that he harbors within".

Despite fluffier hair, Dante's redesign emphasized his elegance, but the accompanying personality change did not endear all: future series character designer Tatsuya Yoshikawa couldn't play the game because "Dante's face was a little too scary". Capcom Design Room illustrator Naru Omori created four cover images for Devil May Cry 2, which he found unsatisfactory due to a short three week deadline, though content with one used on the packaging; as well as the logo pose render, made during an all-nighter. Cutscenes were outsourced near the end of production to the CG animation and motion capture studio Links DigiWorks, who'd contributed to games by other Capcom divisions. Their work impressed Tanaka, which led to a television commercial blending pre-rendered CG with live-action.

Besides playing a role in the contrast, Lucia's skin color, as well the accent she shares with Matier, reflect Vie de Marli's multicultural origins. That factor also played a part in the creation of demons, whose names are derived from languages such as Latin, Greek and archaic Japanese. Ikeno turned to the roots when crafting their designs: "Ancient portrayals of demons rarely incorporated elements that weren't already known to people at the time, so they might have the head of a lion but the body of a human, for instance. It was in this spirit that we decided to make most of our monsters proper chimeras". Inspiration derived from western imagery includes woodblock illustrations of the brazen bull, Norse mythology, the Bible, alchemical symbolism, and rituals with pagan roots. Eastern imagery came from yōkai and Nausicaä of the Valley of the Wind.

Possessed Arius was partly based on deep sea lifeforms and Arius-Argosax on east asian dragons because Ikeno thinks that "the strongest-looking demons tend to be humanoid dragon ones". In his estimate, Argosax the Chaos—an amalgamation that recycles resources and attacks from previous bosses—"probably received more time and effort than anything else in the game", with peculiar coloring because he "really just wanted to make it look weird". Team Devil's arcade background was reflected in the approach to texture mapping: the lack of experience with realistic resources meant most of their textures were handmade, which made its visuals and essence more drawing-like in comparison with Devil May Cry, whose modelers tackled realism by making textures out of photographs.

The option of running through Devil May Cry 2 with Lucia was a result of player feedback per Tanaka:

"A lot of people weren't pleased that you couldn't play as Trish in Devil May Cry. Lucia's here to appease them -- well, at least most of the outspoken of crowd. Plus, we wanted to give Dante a James Bond-like appeal and have a different female lead to play alongside in each new game. The secondary character didn't really have to be female, but a lot of folks thought it would be a good way to balance the selection".

Global player surveys about the original influenced the sequel's design: "people complained of the locked camera viewpoint being disorienting. A lot of effort has been put into addressing this issue and making scene transitions smoother. [...] The two areas people seemed most pleased with in the first game were how cool a character Dante was and the level of action. So we upped the action and made him even slicker". Puzzles were reduced in size and scope in the process of improving combat flow. Weapon switching happens in the moment. Attempts were made to give players flexibility due to complaints about the original's difficulty. Devil May Cry 2 was set up for an easy first playthrough, with an increasing degree of challenge as the player goes through its unlockables. Combo charts for Dante and Lucia were printed on the obverse of the Japanese and Korean releases' case inlay.

Both characters received new, more acrobatic moves to achieve high action possibilities in wide spaces. Team Devil pursued a wider variety in stage design. Missions take place both outdoors and indoors, in a multitude of settings; Tanaka estimated that the environments were approximately nine times as large as the first. This approach was matched by a diversification in atmosphere: "In the original DMC, there were quite a few dark areas [...] This time, we are trying to make sure that players can easily recognize the player character, enemies and items during the game". The first game's engine was used as a base, which by the end of development the staff had altered 98% of, implementing better visual effects and what he claimed was double the resolution of its predecessor, something only perceptible on certain televisions.

Motion animator Hiroyuki Nara was "drafted" into Team Devil near the end of development to work on two unlockables: Dante's Devil May Cry model and Trish, the latter featuring the former's playstyle. He originally planned to port over data from that game's source code backup, but it was useless. Team Little Devils' software crew had great influence and freedom over animations; their constant tinkering meant the backup did not reflect how the retail release behaved, with completely different speed on top of final motions being programmed separately. With help from Team Devil's coders, Nara recreated the animations by eyeballing them on a television running Devil May Cry side by side with his work monitor. The original release lacked flame effects for the "Kick 13" and "Magma Dive" moves, but they were implemented in re-releases.

=== Director change ===
Funamizu gave Team Devil complete creative freedom; since Devil May Cry tells a complete story, they opted to explore various directions. Devil May Cry 2 was originally set in New York City and starred a man in a green jacket instead of Dante, but that was changed due to a number of factors, including the September 11 attacks. Ikeno found the team's approach wrong-headed:

"Looking back at the game's fundamentals, like the visuals and overall designs, we didn't take the parts of DMC (1) that the players really loved into account well enough, so the second game felt very artificial. I think our attitude was a little too much 'We're gonna make it how we want to'. There wasn't enough recognition that 2 was only happening because of the success of 1."

The production of Devil May Cry 2 was a very difficult process, with the staff struggling against its lack of both know-how in 3D action games and manpower due to other titles concurrently in the works within the division. By the point they had around six months left before the deadline, Studio 1 director Hideaki Itsuno had finished work on Capcom vs. SNK 2 and was doing the early conception of what became Dragon's Dogma. Since he appeared to be "idle", his boss ordered his entrance into Team Devil. Itsuno was asked to "reorganize the project" in a supplementary role, which effectively meant taking over leadership, as upper management saw it as director-less. In exchange, he would go uncredited, but ended up the only director listed in the final version of the game. He joined under poor conditions:

"There was a lot of drama over my replacing the old director, and I have nothing but bad memories about that part in particular. (laughs) But basically, they said that nothing was getting done and that needed to change. The scenario hadn't been written, the cutscenes had yet to be shot, and they hadn't decided what to do about Dante's Devil Trigger. They had determined that at least the 'Stinger' attack was essential, so at least they had someone who was going to take care of that. (laughs) But none of the other attacks had been worked on at all."

Itsuno was angered at his assignment and took on the job in a "burning [his] own bridges" way; he originally planned a complete overhaul which would detach the game from the Devil May Cry intellectual property: "part of me was dissatisfied because I hadn't started with the project from day one. As far as I was concerned, that didn't amount to a proper level of involvement with DMC". According to Nara:

"The final days of development on DMC 2 were wild... (laughs) I joined the team right near the end, as the deadline was approaching, and it's no exaggeration to say that every available staff member was mobilized. They even recruited non-team members such as myself. [...] DMC 2 just yanked out all these members from other teams who had been busy working on their own projects".

Morihashi, who handled a multitude of odd jobs, found the toil taxing, to the point of coughing blood: "I was living close to the company, so I'd get home around dawn, bathe, change clothes, and then head right back. I was practically sleeping at work so I wouldn't be late. (laughs) I'd even take naps during lunch breaks". Despite the situation, he was still invested in the series, and asked for Kamiya's advice on how to tackle a sequel featuring Vergil. When he joined Team Devil in February 2002; the story, characters and designs were largely finished; with much to do about gameplay: "The stages were mostly there, but not the missions. [...] It was like we had all the trappings done, but not the filling, which made things very hard". At some point, the game's release date was moved up four months.

Devil May Cry 2 was revealed at a quarterly financial presentation on 13 May, to be released in the second half of fiscal year 2002. A trailer was showcased later that month at E3. Tanaka was vague in disclosing many of the game's features; no concrete information could be given about the orb system because Team Devil was still working on it. Enemy voices and sound effects were recorded at Soundelux in July. Capcom pegged its launch window in early September, Devil May Cry 2 was 65% complete around then. It was showcased with a two-mission long playable demo at the end of the month at Tokyo Game Show, where it was the most popular game at the Capcom booth. With a combination of media and visitor votes, it was one of fifteen titles that won the Award for Excellence of the inaugural Game Awards Future category at the CESA Game Awards; Tanaka stated Team Devil were in the final stages of development during his victory speech. That demo was released on a Dengeki PS2 bundled disc.

Three features emphasized on previews as bringing accessibility to both casual and dedicated players—but cut from the final game—are automatically scaling difficulty, fully customizable controls and multiple paths for all missions; Tanaka felt the uneven mission lengths of Devil May Cry was an issue, and saw the last feature as a way for players to pace playthroughs out to match their preferences. Ikeno's early boss drafts depicted Jokatgulm as either a conventional demon or a humanoid woman whose body is composed of multiple giant skulls with tentacles coming through them; while Nefasturris was based on buddhist art. Among unused foes are a plant demon, masses of bodies and spirits, a rival with abilities similar to Dante's who could shoot energy balls and fly at any time, and a boss would've been a huge dragon with fire attacks. A Bloody Palace floor with four Orangguerra was scrapped because their large size and attack range meant they easily killed one another. Dante's motorcycle would have played a larger part through driving missions and as a weapon, something Itsuno personally proposed to the programmers. Pre-release stills showcased him brandishing Alastor. He was also intended to vocally react as his style rating changes during combat.

Itsuno did everything he could while struggling to release a quality finished product in the conditions the game was. He accomplished everything his superiors wanted from him, but wasn't satisfied. He didn't want Devil May Cry 2 to be his legacy within the series, so before development had wrapped, Itsuno asked his higher-ups for Devil May Cry 3, with himself as director from the start of the project. He rallied Team Devil to stay for it; some members shared his sentiment, with many wanting to work with what they learned making Devil May Cry 2. With regards to player reception, Devil May Cry 2 pleased those who found the original too difficult, but drove much of the player base away, which made Team Devil's goal to win them back.

In November 2020, Capcom was targeted by a ransomware attack, which led to a file batch containing the source code backup for Devil May Cry 2 leaking on the internet.

== Marketing ==
Due to the focus of Devil May Cry 2 on style, Capcom partnered with the Diesel clothing company, which has a history of working with game developers. Per Ikeno, the collaboration happened via Tanaka, who was an ex-Diesel employee: "People on both sides talked at the time and felt that DMC 2 and Diesel's visual styles would work well together and could be quite appealing to the casual audience". Three costumes (one for Dante, two for Lucia) made of pieces from Diesel's 2002 Autumn/Winter collection—which were almost entirely sold out by the point the game came out— and a belt designed by Team Devil's visual staff, were featured as unlockables for players. Devil May Cry 2 posters and kiosks showcasing a demo and trailer were placed in Diesel stores across Japan.

In Japan, a charm bracelet with a detachable steel miniature of Dante's sword Rebellion was distributed in a first come first served basis to people who preordered Devil May Cry 2 through participating retailers. The South Korea-exclusive limited edition contained both the bracelet and a black blouson emblazoned with the game's logo.

One year after the game's release, Dante—sporting the design and some of the personality he has in Devil May Cry 2—was featured as a boss and summonable ally in the Atlus RPG Shin Megami Tensei III: Nocturne Maniax. He is also available in Shin Megami Tensei III: Nocturne HD Remaster by purchasing the "Maniax Pack" downloadable content.

Initially, Capcom was very reluctant to release an officially sanctioned soundtrack for Devil May Cry 2. After a test period during which Capcom sought 1,000 pre-orders as a proof of demand, the Devil May Cry 2 soundtrack was released to the public on October 15, 2004, as a two-disc set, with Masato Kohda, Tetsuya Shibata and Satoshi Ise credited as producers.

== Reception ==
=== Critical reception ===
Reception

Aggregate scores
Aggregator	Score
GameRankings	PS2: 74%
Metacritic	PS2: 68/100

Review scores
Publication	Score
Eurogamer	5/10
GamePro	4/5 stars
GameSpot	6.4/10
IGN	7/10

The game received mixed reviews, according to review aggregator Metacritic. Chief among the complaints was that the difficulty was lower than in the first game. The combat system was also criticized as being less refined, with individual weapons being weaker or stronger variants of the same weapon instead of different weapons with their own advantages and disadvantages. Boss battles were criticized for requiring less strategy than the original. The environment was less detailed than the environments of the first game, trading detail for open space which also made stringing moves and combos together more difficult since enemies were more spaced out, nullifying one of the primary attractions of the first game. Furthermore, Dante's personality change did not sit well with reviewers. The addition of a second disc was seen as a cheap way for the developers to increase replay value since Lucia's missions are simply recycled material from Dante's own missions, with only minor variations. GameSpot chose Devil May Cry 2 as the Most Disappointing Game of 2003. UGO Networks ranked Devil May Cry 2 19th on its list of "The Biggest Disappointments in Video Games", adding "Devil May Cry was so good [...] There was no way Devil May Cry 2 could've lived up to the hype, but it didn't have to fail so spectacularly."

However, the game received some positive reviews. PSXextreme, for example, countered arguments by many critics, stating that the environments only looked worse due to their range, and that the only reason Devil May Cry 2 failed to surpass its origins was due to the lack of challenge. Electronic Gaming Monthly praised the game's control scheme and new ideas, as well as the idea of featuring the two protagonists on separate discs. Play called Lucia's side of the story "a cruel sonnet of self-realization wrapped in a story steeped in religious overtones", stating that the story alone was reason to purchase the game.

=== Sales ===
Capcom positioned Devil May Cry 2 as a blockbuster title for the fiscal year. It sold well, becoming one of the top ten best-selling games in the United Kingdom for the first half of 2003. It earned the 500,000 yen Gold Prize at the 2003 PlayStation Awards for selling between 500,000 and 1 million copies in Japan by July. However, it did not meet corporate expectations: sales totalled 1.4 million copies worldwide by the end of March 2003, slightly below their 1.66 million forecast, itself a reduced estimate from initial projections. (Note: Capcom's initial May 2002 outlook was for Devil May Cry 2 to move 650,000 copies in Japan; 700,000 in North America; and 430,000 in Europe; totaling 1.78 million units. Their readjusted November forecast was for sales of 600,000 in Japan and 360,000 in Europe but kept prior expectations towards North America. The numbers achieved by 31 March 2003 were of 500,000 in Japan; 490,000 in North America; and 410,000 in Europe.) The game's market shortcomings and troubled creation reflected wider struggles within the company: the cancellation of 18 titles in concurrent development with it led Capcom to undertake mid-production evaluations and stronger pre-development project vetting. As of 31 March 2022, over 2.9 million units have been sold. (Note: 1.7 million of the PlayStation 2 release; combined with 1.2 million of the Devil May Cry HD Collection PlayStation 3 and Xbox 360 releases in both physical and digital form.)
