= Cambion =

Half-human half-demon

In European mythology and literature, a cambion (/ˈkæmbiən/) is the child produced from a human–demon sexual union, typically involving an incubus or a succubus. In the word's earliest known uses, it was interchangeable with changeling.

== Changelings ==
Cambion comes from the Late Latin cambiare 'to exchange', and ultimately from the Celtic root "kamb", meaning crooked or exchange. In its earliest known uses, the word is used for a changeling, the child of fairies or demons, who has been substituted for a human baby. William of Auvergne, in his 13th-century work De Universo, wrote of "cambiones, from cambiti, that is 'having been exchanged'": the "sons of incubi demons". These false infants constantly wail for milk and cannot be satisfied even by four nurses. Richard Firth Green notes that this "was to become the standard scholastic explanation for changelings throughout the Middle Ages."

The earliest evidenced appearance of the word "cambion" in the sense of an offspring of two demons is in the 1818 French-language Dictionnaire Infernal. The 1825 edition of that book has the following entry:

CAMBION, — Enfants des Demons. Delancre et Bodin pensent que les démons incubes peuvent s'unir aux démones succubes, et qu'il nait de leur commerce des enfants hideux qu'on nomme cambions ...

English translation:

CAMBION, — Children of Demons. Delancre and Bodin believe that incubus (male) demons can unite with succubus (female) demons, and that born of their exchange are hideous children which are called cambions ...

In the Encyclopedia of Occultism and Parapsychology, the cambion is again said to be the direct offspring of the incubus and the succubus, forgoing any need for human involvement. This same incarnation retained the absence of breath or a pulse until seven years of age, but was said to also have been incredibly heavy (even too heavy for a horse to carry) and to have cried upon being touched.

== Human–demon hybrids ==
Since at least the 19th century, "cambion" has taken on a further definition: the child of an incubus or a succubus with a human parent. In 1874, Victor Hugo's Toilers of the Sea defined a cambion as the son of a woman and the devil. It also appeared as a hybrid of human and demon in Dungeons & Dragons' 1983 Monster Manual II.

The concept of offspring born to humans and demons was a subject of debate in the Middle Ages, but did not have a widely accepted name. The influential Malleus Maleficarum, which has been described as the major compendium of literature in demonology of the fifteenth century, states that demons, including the incubus and the succubus, are incapable of reproduction:

Moreover, to beget a child is the act of a living body, but devils cannot bestow life upon the bodies they assume; because life formally proceeds only from the soul, and the act of generation is the act of the physical organs which have bodily life. Therefore bodies which are assumed in this way cannot either beget or bear.

Because of this inability to create or nurture life, the method of the creation of a cambion is necessarily protracted. A succubus will have sexual relations with a human male and so acquire a sample of his sperm. This she will then pass on to an incubus, who then corrupts and strengthens the seed. The incubus will, in his turn, transfer this sperm to a human female and thus impregnate her.

Yet it may be said that these devils assume a body not in order that they may bestow life upon it, but that they may by the means of this body preserve human semen, and pass the semen on to another body.

The text goes on to discuss at great length the arguments for and against this process being possible, citing a number of Biblical quotations and noted scholars in support of its arguments, and finally concludes that this is indeed the method used by such demons. The Malleus Maleficarum refers to the children of incubi as "campsores" or "Wechselkind" (a German term for changelings).

== In popular culture ==
- Modern writers have sometimes used the term cambion for Merlin, who in Arthurian legend is the son of a mortal woman and an incubus.
- The Dark Horse Comics character Hellboy is a cambion, being the offspring of the demon Azzael and a human woman, Sarah Hughes.
- The DC Comics character Raven is a cambion, being the offspring of the other-dimensional demon Trigon and a human woman, Arella.
- In The Shadowhunter Chronicles, witches and warlocks are the offspring between a human mother and a demon father. The most recurring warlock, Magnus Bane, was born in the Dutch East Indies to a half Dutch, half Indonesian mother after his demon father, Asmodeus, seduced his mother in the form of her husband.
- In The Infernal Devices, Tessa Gray is the daughter of a demon father, Belial, and a nephilim mother, Adele Starkweather, making her unique amongst warlocks.
- In Devil May Cry, Dante and Vergil are the offspring of the Demon Knight Sparda and a human woman Eva.
- In KPop Demon Hunters, Rumi is the daughter of a demon father and a demon hunter human mother.
- In Ultimate Exorcist Kiyoshi, Toji Shuten is a cambion.

== See also ==
- Cambion (Dungeons & Dragons)
- Dhampir (a half-vampire)
- Nephilim (a half-angel)
- Nasnas (a half-genie)
- Grendel
- Jersey Devil
- Robert the Devil
- Sir Gowther
