= Devil May Cry: The Animated Series =

Anime series by Madhouse

- North American DVD cover featuring Dante

デビル メイ クライ (Debiru Mei Kurai)
- Genre: Action; Horror fantasy
- Created by: Capcom
- Anime television series
- Directed by: Shin Itagaki
- Produced by: Takaya Ibira; Tatsuhiro Nitta; Daisuke Katagiri; Tetsurō Satomi
- Written by: Toshiki Inoue
- Music by: rungran
- Studio: Madhouse
- Licensed by: AUS: Madman Entertainment; NA: Crunchyroll; UK: Manga Entertainment
- Original network: WOWOW
- English network: US: Funimation Channel, Chiller
- Original run: June 14, 2007 – September 6, 2007
- Episodes: 12
- icon

Devil May Cry: The Animated Series (Japanese: デビル メイ クライ, Hepburn: Debiru Mei Kurai) is a Japanese animated series based on the Devil May Cry video games by Capcom. It is set sometime between Devil May Cry and Devil May Cry 2. The show is produced by the animation studio Madhouse and directed by Shin Itagaki. It debuted on the WOWOW TV network in Japan on June 14, 2007, and ran 12 episodes.

On June 30, 2007, at Anime Expo 07, it was announced that ADV Films had licensed the show. However, in 2008, it became one of more than 30 titles that were transferred to Funimation. The series made its North American television debut on the Funimation Channel in September 2010 and it began airing on Chiller's Anime Wednesdays block on July 15, 2015.

== Plot ==
The series is set sometime between Devil May Cry and Devil May Cry 2. It is based on the manga and novel volumes, and sees the return of series regulars Trish and Lady.

In the show, Dante runs his devil-hunting business, “Devil May Cry”, while struggling under constant financial debt. Two new characters were also introduced — Dante's agent Morrison, who helps his chronically indebted client find work and gives him helpful life advice, and Patty Lowell, a young orphan girl he saves in the first episode, who develops a father-daughter relationship with him.

While the show's stories were mostly self-contained, a season-long plot was introduced in the first episode and came to the forefront in episodes 10–12.

== Characters ==
Dante (ダンテ)
Voiced by: Toshiyuki Morikawa (Japanese); Reuben Langdon (credited as Justin Cause) (English)
The half-demon son of Sparda, the legendary Dark Knight (a demon) and Eva (a human), Dante operates as a private investigator, mostly accepting jobs involving the supernatural. When he accepts a job, he diligently finishes it to the point of gaining a reputation for infallibility. Dante is strong enough to defeat a small army of lesser demons on his own, can easily shake off wounds that would kill normal humans, and possesses superhuman levels of speed, accuracy, and hand-eye coordination. Known for his cocky banter while working, he is fond of strawberry sundaes and pizza (as long as it does not have olives). His weapons of choice are a pair of Colt .45 pistols known as Ebony (for its dark color) and Ivory (for its silver color), and his sentient sword, Rebellion, which he conceals in a guitar case. Despite his talent for devil-slaying, Dante also suffers from an apparent lack of skill at gambling and always seems to be in debt, to the point where he often has to trick people when they try to get money from him and his office is frequently subject to cuts in power and water service. According to Dante, this is because people who hire him usually leave him a bill instead of paying him (due to the destruction his demonic abilities and weapons cause, such as destroying a bridge or building). His lack of money is also attributed to his associate Lady, to whom he owes an unspecified sum of money which she takes out of his earnings. When Dante does earn some money, he usually squanders it in a few days, either on junk food or taking care of Patty.

Patty Lowell (パティ・ローエル, Pati Rōeru)
Voiced by: Misato Fukuen (Japanese); Hilary Haag (English)
A young girl who Dante met after she supposedly came into a large inheritance and he was hired to protect her from demons. This turned out to be a scam, and Dante was eventually forced to take her in after learning that she was an orphan. Eventually, it was revealed that she was the last living descendant of a powerful sorcerer who imprisoned Abigail, one of the most powerful demons to ever exist. Patty is very girly and loves cute things, but often makes Dante spend what little money he has on her. She loves romantic TV shows and serves as Dante's only source of feminine influence whenever Trish and Lady are absent. While Dante often derides her as a spoiled brat, he nevertheless allows her to assist him at Devil May Cry.

Trish (トリッシュ, Torisshu)
Voiced by: Atsuko Tanaka (Japanese); Luci Christian (English)
A demon crafted by the demon lord Mundus in the image of Dante's mother to lure Dante into a trap and kill him. Instead, Trish became sympathetic to Dante and betrayed her master, becoming Dante's partner before parting ways with him and supporting herself as a freelance demon hunter. She occasionally runs into Dante since they share the same line of work. While she and Lady nearly killed each other when they first met, they bonded over making jabs at Dante's expense (and conning him into covering their bills). Trish's signature move is her ability to generate and control powerful bolts of electricity.

Lady (レディ, Redi)
Voiced by: Fumiko Orikasa (Japanese); Melissa Davis (English)
A demon hunter descended from a priestess who sacrificed herself so that Sparda could seal the gate between the human and demon worlds. Although her birth name is Mary, everyone who knows her calls her Lady. Lady is one of Dante's oldest friends and her silhouette is the inspiration for the Devil May Cry logo. Lady occasionally contacts Dante to offer him jobs, using the large debt he owes her as leverage so he has to accept them. Despite being human, she is a skilled acrobat and talented gambler with access to numerous weapons, such as bayonets and her signature Kalina-Ann rocket launcher.

J.D. Morrison (J・D・モリソン, J. D. Morison)
Voiced by: Akio Ōtsuka (Japanese); Rob Mungle (English)
Dante's liaison and close friend. He solicits jobs for Devil May Cry, handles business matters that Dante can't be bothered to deal with, and offers him advice on how to be a better person.

Sid (シド, Shido)
Voiced by: Nachi Nozawa (Japanese); Christopher Ayres (English)
A lesser demon who has recurring appearances throughout the series. Initially seeming to be no more than a minor nuisance, Dante shows mercy towards Sid and refrains from killing him when given the opportunity. Sid, in turn, repeatedly schemes to have Dante killed so that he can increase his own power and influence among his fellow demons. Dante finally kills him when Sid tries to revive the demon Abigail.

== Reception ==
Critical response to the anime was mixed. Anime News Network liked Dante's characterization despite flaws in the writing. IGN concurred, finding Langdon a better actor than Toshiyuki Morikawa because of his experience with the series. DVD Talk liked the interactions between Dante, Lady, and Trish; the reviewer expected more of them in the anime, rather than stories focused on Dante facing enemies. He found Dante appealing in the anime series, based on his personality and actions. According to a FandomPost reviewer, Dante's role in the anime differed from the games in his childish behaviour over food and money; however, he was still "a great character". Otaku USA said that in the anime Dante remained faithful to his game version in his actions, most notably the gory (but limited) fighting. The Fandom Post appreciated the episode in which Lady fights Trish because of a misunderstanding but they befriend each other. The writer also enjoyed the duo's role in the following episodes, most notably in the finale. GroundReport described Trish and Lady as foils for Dante and compared them with the main characters from the manga and anime series GetBackers due to Dante's financial issues, often receiving jobs from Lady. In a 2026 retrospective review, Lamar Ramos of Crunchyroll complimented the "monster of the week" format, noting how it presented familiar characters in new contexts. Specifically, he praised Dante's relationship with Patty for revealing a previously unseen, softer side of his character. Ramos also praised the art, noting that it refined the horror/fantasy art style of the games while capturing "the eeriness and a melancholic tone that defined the early games."

=== China ban ===
On June 12, 2015, the Chinese Ministry of Culture listed Devil May Cry among 38 anime and manga titles banned in China.
