= Devil May Cry 4 =

2008 video game

- Developer: Capcom
- Publisher: Capcom
- Director: Hideaki Itsuno
- Producer: Hiroyuki Kobayashi
- Writer: Bingo Morihashi
- Composers: Tetsuya Shibata; Kento Hasegawa; Akihiko Narita
- Series: Devil May Cry
- Engine: MT Framework
- Platforms: PlayStation 3; Xbox 360; Microsoft Windows; Android; iOS; Shield Android TV
- Release: January 31, 2008: PlayStation 3, Xbox 360; JP: January 31, 2008; NA: February 5, 2008; AU: February 7, 2008; EU: February 8, 2008 Microsoft Windows; NA: July 8, 2008; AU: July 10, 2008; EU: July 11, 2008; JP: July 24, 2008 Android, iOS; WW: February 3, 2011 Shield Android TV; WW: 2016
- Genres: Action-adventure, hack and slash
- Mode: Single-player

Devil May Cry 4 (Note: Japanese: デビル メイ クライ4, Hepburn: Debiru Mei Kurai Fō) is a 2008 action-adventure game developed and published by Capcom. It was released for the PlayStation 3, Xbox 360, and Microsoft Windows platforms. It is the fourth installment in the Devil May Cry series and is written by Bingo Morihashi and directed by Hideaki Itsuno. The story follows Nero, a young man possessing demonic powers who is on a mission to stop the series' main character, Dante, after he assassinates the leader of the Order of the Sword. The player assumes the role of both Nero and Dante as they fight enemies using their demonic powers and a variety of weapons.

Devil May Cry 4 is the first entry in the series to be released simultaneously for multiple consoles. During its development, Capcom focused on each version achieving the same visual quality using the MT Framework game engine. Around eighty people formed the team that created the game. Nero was introduced to attract the new gamers. Dante's popularity with gamers proved challenging because the developers needed to use him as a supporting character in the story.

Critical reception to Devil May Cry 4 was positive. It was praised for its challenging difficulty, its visuals and Nero's characterization as a new protagonist. However, it was criticized for its backtracking in Dante's stages and a troublesome camera. The game sold over three million units worldwide, becoming the series' best-selling title before the release of its sequel. Bingo Morihashi adapted it into a two-volume light novel.

It was released on iOS as Devil May Cry 4: Refrain in February 2011. A remastered version of the game was released in June 2015 as Devil May Cry 4: Special Edition which adds the option to switch between English and Japanese voice tracks in the Japanese release, improved visual effects and textures, in-game re-balancing, additional costumes, and three bonus playable characters: Vergil, Lady and Trish. A sequel, Devil May Cry 5, was released on March 8, 2019.

== Gameplay ==
Gameplay in Devil May Cry 4 is like previous games in the series. The player must fight through a linear sequence of levels called "missions", occasionally solving puzzles or gathering items. Performance in a mission is graded from "D", the lowest grade, to "A" then "S", "SS", and "SSS", the highest grade. Grades are based on items used, Red Orbs gathered, time taken, and the number of Style Points accumulated. Each Style Point grade has its own tag-word. The stylish grade shows up on the side of the screen and begins at "Deadly" (D); progresses through "Carnage" (C), "Brutal" (B), and "Atomic" (A); then, advances through one last bar of grades containing the phrases "Smokin'" (S), "Smokin' Style" (SS), and lastly "Smokin' Sick Style" (SSS). Stylish combat is the focus of the game, conveyed through unbroken combos of varied attacks while avoiding damage. The player must avoid enemy attacks to continue performing combos, often by memorizing attack patterns. The player can perform taunts in combat, with different animations for the character based on the current stylish grade. Taunting enemies without being hit rewards the player with a slight increase in Style Points and the energy in the Devil Trigger gauge. The Devil Trigger is a temporary super-powered state that changes the animations of some of the player character´s attacks and increases damage done, while adding a slow but steady health regeneration. Devil Trigger can be activated by pressing the corresponding button when the gauge is filled.

Some changes introduced in Devil May Cry 4 are the presence of two playable characters, Dante and Nero, and a slight modification to the shop system. A new currency, Proud Souls, is used to buy new abilities while Red Orbs are used to buy consumable items and some upgrades. Red Orbs are obtained mainly by defeating enemies, based on the player´s stylish grade at that time, and destroying environmental objects during missions. Proud Souls are awarded at the end of missions; the amount varies depending on how well the player performed. The cost of abilities increases with the purchase of other abilities, though all abilities can be refunded for their original price.

Nero uses his Devil Bringer ability to parry Dante's attack. The green bar at the top shows Nero's health while the yellow one shows Dante's.

The player plays as Nero throughout most of the game. He is equipped with the Red Queen sword, Blue Rose revolver, and the powers of his Devil Bringer. The Red Queen features an Exceed Gauge that can be charged up to 3 stages, allowing for subsequent attacks that are more powerful than regular slashes, until the gauge empties; and with precise timing, the gauge can be charged after each attack. Nero also has the powers of his Devil Bringer and can use it to pull himself towards enemies or vice versa. The Devil Bringer may also be used for context-sensitive throw attacks, leading to high damage and various effects depending on the enemy. Nero's Devil Bringer also gains new abilities during the game, including being able to detect secret missions or caches of Red Orbs. Nero eventually gains the ability to use Devil Trigger after getting the katana known as Yamato. This increases his Devil Bringer's power changing its attacks into more powerful versions with different animations.

The player plays as Dante through seven missions, taking over halfway through the game. His gameplay is like that in Devil May Cry 3. He has access to multiple melee and ranged weapons which he gains after boss battles. He is able to cycle through them freely in combat and is no longer limited to equipping two weapons of each type as he was in the previous game. Dante also begins with his four combat styles, each of which grants him different abilities. But, unlike in Devil May Cry 3, the player may now switch between Dante´s styles at will with buttons or pads on the controller. Dante also gains the Dark Slayer style near the end of his appearance, which only has one style level. Styles do not level up through experience as in the previous game, but instead must be upgraded like other skills in the shop screen in between missions or at statues. Dante can also enter Devil Trigger where he gains most of the benefits that Nero's Devil Trigger has. Since he does not have the Devil Bringer, the animations and properties of some of his normal attacks change instead.

== Plot ==
Nero is a young demon hunter who lives on the isolated island of Fortuna and is also a member of the Order of the Sword: a religious sect of knights who worship the Legendary Dark Knight Sparda as a God. Dante arrives, and murders The Order's leader, the High Priest Sanctus, in front of the entire congregation. At the same time, an army of demons invades the city, putting everyone, including Nero's love interest Kyrie, in danger. Tasked with stopping Dante by Kyrie's brother Credo, the Captain of the Holy Knights, Nero's journey leads him to discover that he is in fact a descendant of Sparda himself, and Dante is not his enemy. Under orders from Sanctus, Agnus has been siphoning the power of the long lost Devil Arm Yamato, the sword of Dante's brother Vergil, to create a demonic army and imbue high-ranking members of the Order with demonic power. To Agnus' shock, the shattered Yamato restores itself in Nero's presence and flies to Nero's aid. With The Order's plans revealed, Agnus flees to inform the newly resurrected Sanctus.

As Nero sets his sights on The Order, he discovers to his dismay that Credo is part of the conspiracy, until he ends up being deceived as well when they witness Kyrie being kidnapped by Sanctus. He intends to use a gargantuan statue-like creature known as the Savior to defeat the demon army he's created, as a means of strengthening the people's worship of Sparda. With the Sparda Sword already in his possession and needing the blood of a descendant of Sparda along with the Yamato, Sanctus captures Nero to power the Savior's core. Dante arrives with Trish, who was revealed to be a spy within The Order, and makes a promise to the dying Credo to save Nero and Kyrie. Splitting up, Trish evacuates Fortuna's human residents, while Dante destroys all the Hell Gates scattered over Fortuna and defeats Agnus, reclaiming the Yamato sword for the last time. Confronting the Savior in a sky battle above Fortuna, Dante drives the Yamato through the Savior's chest, where Nero recovers it inside, freeing himself and Kyrie as well as defeating Sanctus.

Nero is able to make peace with the demonic power he possesses, resolving to use it to protect those he cares about. Before Dante leaves, he decides to entrust Nero with the Yamato, and Kyrie and Nero share their first kiss in the ruins of Fortuna. Meanwhile, back at Dante's shop, Lady pays Dante and Trish for a job well done. Trish answers Dante's phone and lets him know it's a customer with a password. Sharing in the excitement, Trish and Lady tag along with Dante on another mission.

== Development ==
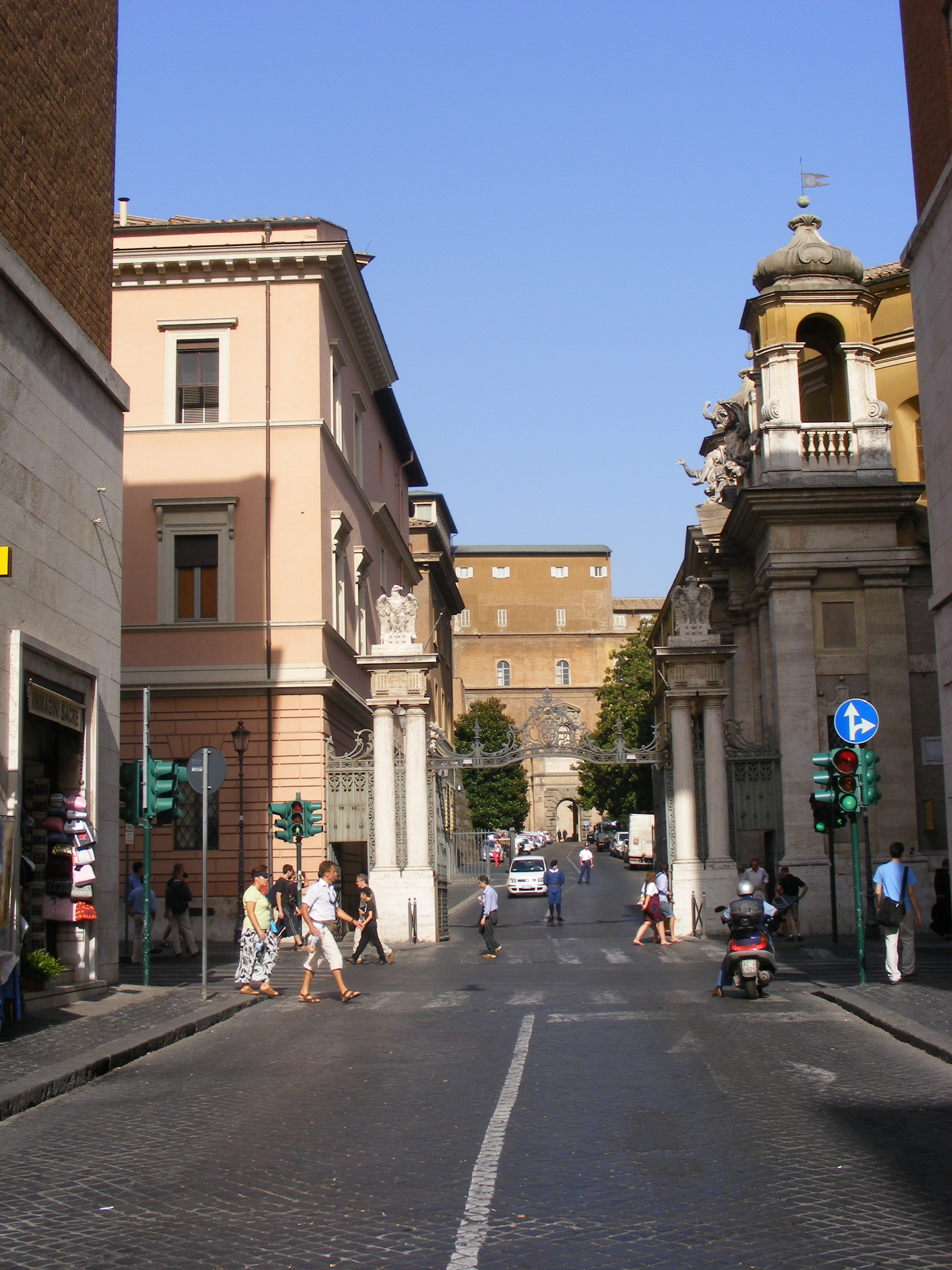
Vatican City was one of the main inspirations for the fictional city of Fortuna.

Development of Devil May Cry 4 began shortly after its predecessor was a success. A total of eighty people formed the development team. The first teaser was that of Dante on a snowy peak shown at E3 2005, while the Tokyo Game Show 2005 trailer showed Dante doing multiple moves in front of a camera, both containing elements that were not included in the finished product. Capcom only made the E3 2005 video to confirm their staff had begun work on the game. Since they had just finished Devil May Cry 3 and Devil May Cry 3: Special Edition, the developers initially were confused in regards to what they had to do in order to innovate the gameplay mechanics they developed previously. The team wanted to introduce new gameplay elements and a new character allowed them to do this. This was the first Devil May Cry not to be released for PlayStation 2, because it was designed for the next generation of hardware. This allowed the team to try new play mechanics and expand the series' plot. While not intending to send a religious message, members from the Capcom team did research in Vatican City and Istanbul.

On September 6, 2006, Japanese video game magazine Famitsu reported that the previous games' main character, Dante, would not be the protagonist in Devil May Cry 4. Instead, a new character named Nero, voiced and motion captured by Johnny Yong Bosch, took the lead. The use of a new protagonist was discussed many times at Capcom but was not approved until producer Hiroyuki Kobayashi said that the Dante character had to be in the game. Fearing negative feedback, as happened when Konami's stealth game Metal Gear Solid 2: Sons of Liberty introduced a new character, replacing protagonist Solid Snake with newcomer Raiden, producer Kobayashi said Capcom aimed to make Nero fun to play like Dante and intended to make him stronger at some point.

Two of the game's PC exclusive features are Turbo Mode (previously used only in Devil May Cry 3: Special Edition) giving the game a twenty percent speed boost, and a new difficulty mode called Legendary Dark Knight Mode which can display over 100 enemies in some missions at once. Both features returned in the Devil May Cry 4: Special Edition release.

The PC version also has both DirectX 9 and DirectX 10 mode. It is labeled Games for Windows and runs on Windows XP, Vista, and Windows 7. It assumes a gamepad is present and only uses the mouse in the menus, providing the same interface as the Xbox 360 version.

=== Engine ===
Hiroyuki Kobayashi noted the production team began working with the game using a PC-based engine. He said that this was the first PlayStation 3 game developed by Capcom, and making this transition was a "hard step", particularly because no member of the production team was familiar with the console's capabilities. Capcom justified the game's multi-platform crossover by emphasizing the Xbox 360's success in the North American and European markets, labeling the move as "natural". The final version of Devil May Cry 4 uses Capcom's internally developed MT Framework engine. In a thread questioning the move on the official Capcom message board, the company's senior director of strategic planning and research, Christian Svensson, responded by saying that they were moved by people's strong feelings about the decision, but that it was the best decision for the company and consumers. He also claimed that the contents would be identical, except that "the feel of the controller" may cause a slight difference. Despite Capcom having already used the MT Framework to create two Xbox 360 games-Dead Rising and Lost Planet, the team found difficulties with this engine. The developers first showed a demo of the game at Tokyo Game Show 2006 where Dante fought the boss character Berial. The visuals satisfied the Capcom staff to the point where they called them a "miracle".

Itsuno said in the Famitsu article that the visuals attempt to deliver a satisfying feel of being in the air. The actions of Nero's Devil Bringer could not be done on second generation consoles, but they could be done on the new generation of consoles such as the PlayStation 3. Kobayashi said the Xbox 360 and PlayStation 3 versions would be identical, although he did not comment on the PC version. Kobayashi confirmed the PC version "would be great, because the same team is working on both". The PlayStation 3 version requires the user to install 5GB of game data which takes 20 minutes and shortens the length of the loading screens throughout the game.

During production, new gameplay options were implemented to "keep up with fresh action games"; among these is the Devil Bringer's ability to bring enemies towards the characters. Unlike Dante's progress in Devil May Cry 3, Nero was designed to become stronger by upgrading his Devil Bringer ability instead of receiving new weapons after defeating boss characters. During development the production team decided that Nero would be one of two main characters and that Dante was not going to be the only character from previous entries to appear in the series. Producer Hiroyuki Kobashi noted before the game's release they wanted to make Dante seem significantly more powerful than Nero. This was done to create an obvious difference between the strength of a "veteran" when compared to a "rookie". Unlike Devil May Cry 3, the game's difficulty would be the same in both the Japanese and European versions as the version released in North America.

=== Scenario and cast ===
For the first time in the series Bingo Morihashi was the game's writer. He collaborated with film director Yuji Shimomura who worked on the earlier games. Morihashi had many issues with the making of the game to the point he quit Capcom. However, after Itsuno's asked him to return, he did so. He finished writing the game's events, which took a year. Morihashi had difficulties with the characterization of Nero, the new protagonist. Dante returned as a supporting character. Itsuno was responsible for most of Kyrie's elements. She was envisioned as an "ordinary, cute heroine" who had a big impact on Nero despite not being a fighter. Her role was to motivate Nero and the player as the story progresses.

The writings of late manga artist Ramo Nakajima in the series Amagasaki City inspired Morihashi to write Nero's story; "I love you, so I protect the city you love." Love is the focus of the Devil May Cry series; Devil May Cry 4 focuses on Nero's love for Kyrie. While Devil May Cry 4 is a simple story similar to Hollywood movies involving a damsel in distress, the staff were satisfied with it because it also carried Morihashi's ideas well. The Capcom staff created Nero as a new protagonist who would develop across the Devil May Cry series because Dante had become stronger with each game. Nero was created as a weaker character who develops new powers as the story progresses until he reaches Dante's level. This was done mostly through his "Devil Bringer" ability, which makes him stand out. Another reason for Nero's introduction was to attract new gamers to the franchise.

Before commencing the designs for the characters in Devil May Cry 4, character designer Tatsuya Yoshikawa consulted with several members of the staff who had worked on the series before to become familiar with previous elements. The characters were designed to emphasize their moves, which made the staff controlling their motions vital to the design. Some of the antagonist's demonic forms in Devil May Cry 4 resemble angels. These characters were designed to be attractive to the game's audience while providing a contrast when compared to other demons in the game. Yoshikawa noted that several of the boss characters presented some difficulty when creating them. He said that Nero's design was one of the biggest challenges he had experienced in his career, because the character had to be accepted by the public and fit in the series' universe. Yoshikawa liked the interactions between Nero and Dante because of the balance the two playable characters make.

Yoshikawa also created another devil transformation, the Devil Trigger, for Nero. Unlike Dante's transformation that makes him look like a devil, Nero's Devil Trigger generates a creature situated behind his back. One that did not appear in the game turned Nero into a demon like Dante. Nero's hood covers one eye as a symbol whose interpretation is left up to the fans. Yoshikawa wanted to incorporate this into the game and hoped to make it into a figurine, but this was not possible.

Both main voice and motion capture actors, Reuben Langdon and Bosch, expressed pleasure working as Dante and Nero, respectively with the former noting he made Dante like his younger Devil May Cry 3 persona but more mature. Langdon's inspiration for the character was Roy Focker of the anime series The Super Dimension Fortress Macross.

=== Music ===
The soundtrack for Devil May Cry 4 was composed by Tetsuya Shibata, Shusaku Uchiyama, Kento Hasegawa, Akihiko Narita, Kota Suzuki, Rei Kondoh, Masayoshi "Chamy" Ishi, Masami Ueda and Shinichiro Sato. Shibata said that since the release of Devil May Cry 3 he had wanted to emphasized lyrics in the fourth title. The game is noted for its use of heavy metal songs.

Devil May Cry 4 Original Soundtrack is a three-disc, 104 track soundtrack. It was released in Japan on February 27, 2008. Female vocals are handled by Aubrey Ashburn (1-02) while male vocals are handled by Shawn "Shootie HG" McPherson of Hostile Groove (1-20 and 3-03) and Jason "ShyBoy" Arnold of Hypnogaja (1-13 and 3-38). Tetsuya Shibata is credited as the primary composer, with tracks composed by Shusaku Uchiyama, Kota Suzuki, Akihiko Narita, Rei Kondoh, Chamy Ishikawa and Shinichiro Satoh. The soundtrack was released in the US on November 25, 2008, with new artwork.

== Marketing and release ==
The first teaser trailer was shown at E3 2005, depicting Dante traveling through a snow-covered environment. A more substantial trailer was released at that year's Tokyo Game Show, with a more rugged and older Dante in a city-like setting. Both teasers show very little detail of the game itself. At the 2006 Tokyo Game Show, a more complete trailer debuted, along with a playable demo, featuring the character Nero.

A fourth trailer, released on December 17, 2007, revealed more gameplay and story detail, as well as information on new songs for the game. These included a new version of "Lock and Load", Dante's theme music from the first Devil May Cry, with new lyrics written and performed by Shawn "Shootie HG" McPherson, the lyricist and lead vocalist on the soundtrack of Devil May Cry 3: Dante's Awakening. Released with the Japanese version of the game is Japanese rock band, L'Arc-en-Ciel, and their new single, "Drink It Down", which is used as the Japanese opening for the game. The company presented the game's first demo at an event titled "Capcom's Gamer's Day", where Kobayashi highlighted several of the game's features. With the team focused on completing the game, a new demo was not produced in time for the 2007 E3 Media and Business Summit.

=== Collector's Edition ===
A collector's edition of the game was released at the same time as the regular version. The North American version features a bonus disc containing the making of Devil May Cry 4, and an additional disc of the first four episodes of Devil May Cry: The Animated Series, while the European and Australian versions include a signed artbook instead, titled Art of the Devil A very small number of Collector's Edition packages were signed by the game's producer, Hiroyuki Kobayashi, on the back of the metal tin on Dante's left shoulder. This number was reported to be as low as only 100 signed copies for each console, for a total of 200 signed copies. Both versions were packaged in a steelbook case.

An iOS version called Devil May Cry 4: Refrain was announced January 11, 2011. It was released on February 3, 2011.

== Reception ==
=== Critical reception ===
Reception

Aggregate score
Aggregator	Score
Metacritic	PS3: 84/100; X360: 84/100; PC: 78/100

Review scores
Publication	Score
1Up.com	A−
Edge	8/10
Famitsu	35/40
Game Informer	9/10
GameSpot	8/10
GameSpy	4/5
GameTrailers	8.6/10
GameZone	9/10
Hardcore Gamer	4.25/5
IGN	8.7/10

Devil May Cry 4 received favorable reviews, according to review aggregator Metacritic. Japanese gaming magazine Famitsu gave the game a "Platinum" rank as part of its review. It praised the difficulty balance and gameplay options.

Devil May Cry 4 received praise for its hack and slash mechanics. Xbox World Australia called it "the most solid of all of the Devil May Cry games" citing its responsive controls despite being the first game in the series to be released for the Xbox 360 and PlayStation 3. PSM3 rated the game's degree of difficulty positively based on how the system ranks the player and the challenges the game offers. 1UP.com praised the gameplay and "predictably slick" looks. However, sites often criticized the game's backtracking elements, a big issue found within the level design. Some criticized the theme songs. The use of boss fights and the approach to the action's style was well received by GameSpot. They felt it would attract and appeal to gamers despite the backtracking issues.

As to the presentation, GameTrailers praised the voice acting, fight scenes, but criticized the corny dialogue. GameSpy said the game succeeds thanks to its gameplay and visuals. The introduction of Nero as new protagonist was well received. Bosch's voice acting in the English-language version was also praised by GameZone and GameSpot. Despite the similarities between Nero and Dante, IGN still found the new protagonist appealing based on how different his gameplay is from the returning hero's. IGN agreed, finding Nero's story appealing. The GameSpy review also praised the Nero character for "[bringing] something fresh to the franchise" and being "as diverse as DMC3 SE's Vergil". When it came to the console version, IGN said fans would enjoy the video game, but might be disappointed that Dante had fewer weapons and missions than he did in Devil May Cry 3. GameSpy also said that "it cheapens things a little to see that the team has opted to recycle assets in lieu of showing us more of this rich world". They did not find the soundtrack appealing. Hyper's Dirk Watch commended the game for "looking great, combos galore and being more fun than Devil May Cry 3". However, he criticized it for "still playing like Devil May Cry 2" and for its "choppy pacing and level design".

The PC version received mixed reviews. 1UP.com appreciated the port's exclusive Legendary Dark Knight mode where the character is cornered by multiple enemies in a single battle. However, they felt that Capcom could have made a more comfortable controller as it had similar issues as the one from Resident Evil 4. They expected the developers to have put in more features. While also appreciating Dark Knight and the Turbo mode that increased the game's speed, IGN said this port was only for hardcore fans of the series since it was not too different from the original console versions. Nevertheless, GameZone said that Capcom did not rush the port and praised it for being as enjoyable as the original game in contrast to other PC ports.

=== Sales ===
Capcom expected Devil May Cry 4 to ship 1.8 Million Units by the end of its fiscal year. Upon its release week in Japan, the PlayStation 3 version outsold the Xbox 360 version—140,000 units to 28,000. On February 20, 2008, Capcom's president Haruhiro Tsujimoto announced in a press release that the game shipped two million copies in its first month, making it the fastest selling title in the series. By the end of the title's launch year, it had sold 2.32 million copies and would eventually reach the milestone of three million units sold by December 31, 2014. Capcom's Christian Svensson noted the PC retail version's sales in the US did not meet his expectations. A digital download version was only available in pirated form as Capcom Japan did not allow the game to be sold online. A PC digital distribution release was made available over a year later.

=== Legacy ===
A two-volume graphic novel adaptation of the game titled Devil May Cry 4: Deadly Fortune was released in 2009 by Capcom. It is written by Bingo Morihashi and his assistant writer Yasui Kentarou. In the afterword, Morihashi wrote that some of the novel's scenes were intended to be included in the game but were removed due to production issues.

Director Hideaki Itsuno noted the action system implemented in the game was expanded further in his next title Dragon's Dogma. Kobayashi said fans of Devil May Cry 4 might enjoy this new RPG game.

The series' original creator, Hideki Kamiya, said he used this game for research while developing Bayonetta, an action game that would use a similar style and which borrowed elements from the Devil May Cry series. In 2010, the game was included as one of the titles in the book 1001 Video Games You Must Play Before You Die.

In the fighting game Street Fighter V, Dante and Nero's original appearance serve as alternate costumes.

A sequel, Devil May Cry 5, was announced by Capcom in June 2018. It released on 8 March 2019 and featured the return of Nero, Dante and introduced a new playable character known as "V".
