= Hideaki Itsuno =

Japanese video game designer and director

- 伊津野 英昭
- Born: April 7, 1971 (age 55); Osaka, Japan
- Occupations: Video game director, designer
- Years active: 1994–present
- Employer(s): Capcom (1994–2024); LightSpeed Studios (2024–present)
- Known for: Street Fighter Alpha; Rival Schools; Power Stone; Capcom vs. SNK; Devil May Cry; Dragon's Dogma
- Website: twitter.com/tomqe

Hideaki Itsuno (伊津野 英昭, Itsuno Hideaki) is a Japanese video game director and designer. He was born in Osaka, Japan, and formerly worked at Capcom. He has been a director and producer for several series at Capcom, including Rival Schools, Power Stone, Devil May Cry and Dragon's Dogma.

== Career ==
=== Early years (1994–2002) ===
Hideaki Itsuno was a fighting game fan who was hired by Capcom in 1994; his entrance exam happened the same day as the Super Street Fighter II Turbo location test. He went for it over other companies because it would be an easy commute. There, he was assigned work as a designer on their arcade division (which by 1997 had been reorganized as Production Studio 1), starting with two quiz games. In that first year at the company, a project for a Street Fighter prequel was brewing; Itsuno's superior Noritaka Funamizu saw there was no designer attached, and asked him to take that role in December. Other members of that team came from the same background, all gathered so Street Fighter Alpha had a broader appeal and captured the audience drawn to SNK fighters.

His first director job was on another fighter, Star Gladiator, a project he entered halfway through to fulfill a desire: "at the time I wanted to make that kind of game with a large scale cabinet, because Capcom had never done anything like that before. That's why I joined the company". Due to visual effects and hardware constraints, that game runs at 30 frames per second, to Itsuno's chagrin: "At 30fps, I feel you can't have a real competitive fighting game, so I wanted to make a linear fighting game with 60fps in mind". Driven to make a 60fps polygon-based fighting game, he conceived an original project with wide appeal—driven so partly by a more story-heavy approach and the inclusion of role-playing elements—which became Rival Schools: United By Fate.

Most of Itsuno's output for the first nine years of his career was fighting games, both in 2D and 3D, as either director or designer. As the genre and the arcade market declined, he worked on console games of various genres, within both positions he'd been in before: One Piece Mansion, GioGio's Bizarre Adventure and Auto Modellista.

=== Devil May Cry and Dragon's Dogma (2003–2024) ===
After Itsuno had finished work on Capcom vs. SNK 2, he started conceiving a role-playing video game. Since he appeared to be "idle", his boss ordered him to work on Devil May Cry 2. Itsuno was asked to "reorganize the project" in a supplementary role, which effectively meant taking over leadership, as upper management saw it as director-less. In exchange, he would go uncredited, but ended up the only director listed in the final version of the game. Most of Team Devil (the staff on that title) had not worked on Devil May Cry and lacked experience in 3D action-adventure games, which resulted in a production severely behind schedule with six months left on the deadline. Itsuno accomplished the request, but was dissatisfied with his level of involvement and the final product's quality.

He didn't want Devil May Cry 2 to be his legacy within the series, so before development had wrapped, Itsuno asked his higher-ups for Devil May Cry 3, with himself as director from the start of the project. He rallied Team Devil to stay for it; some members shared his sentiment, with many wanting to work with what they learned making Devil May Cry 2. Gameplay elements such as the size of environments and the game's battle engine were reconsidered, and common criticisms such as decreases to Dante's cockiness and the game's difficulty were brought back in line with the first game. These changes were met with praise and the game was very well-received.

Itsuno returned to direct Devil May Cry 4. He stated that the visual design sought to deliver a satisfying sensation of floating in the air, and that the actions of Nero's Devil Bringer could not be done on contemporary generation consoles, necessitating a new generation of consoles such as the PlayStation 3. Devil May Cry 4 (2008) was met with both commercial and critical success.

Itsuno later directed Dragon's Dogma. During the press conference at Capcom's Captivate event in 2011, he called it a game he had been dreaming of making since his school days, which could be finally realized due to technological advancements. At the time of the press conference, he had been directing a staff of 150 people at Capcom Japan for three years of concept and project development. In the process, the team developed techniques that allow the feel of playing in 60fps on a 30fps game.

Itsuno stated that his team had "come up to this point through our experience of action games. We're trying to make a new genre: We're using our action heritage and putting that into an action RPG." He cited the influence of Capcom's previous works (such as Breath of Fire, Resident Evil, Devil May Cry, and Monster Hunter), other Eastern RPGs such as Dragon Quest, and Western RPGs such as Fable and Oblivion. Itsuno later explained that they had "seen a great deal of open-world action RPGs over the years, [but never] one that really put everything together in the action parts. We figured that if there hasn't been a game made by people who understand how action works, then we ought to do it ourselves. We wanted a game where the player is thrown into the world and needs to figure out how to stay alive via nothing but his own controller".

However, the game was designed to allow players to take a less action-oriented approach, with Itsuno stating that they "[made] this game such that you can beat the monsters even if you build up EXP, collect good companions and/or pawns, and sit back and watch the battle unfold." He elaborated that while it is an action game, "that's not all that it is. You can fully configure your party and put as much thought as you like into battle, which is something we're doing for people who really want to get into this world".

Initially, Dragon's Dogma was intended to be a Western fantasy game. In March 2012, Itsuno said he hoped the game would sell 10 million copies worldwide and one million in Japan. It was successful upon release, prompting Capcom to begin development on a sequel. Itsuno reports that the team was only able to accomplish 60-70% of what they had wanted to in the first game, and hope to include those ideas in the sequel.

In 2012, Itsuno hinted that the Rival Schools and Capcom vs. SNK series may see a revival. The former series was once again hinted in the next year alongside the possibility of a new Devil May Cry entry. Itsuno has also expressed interest in developing a fighting game that would recreate the influence Street Fighter II had on the genre.

The next game in the Devil May Cry series, DmC: Devil May Cry, was developed by British developer Ninja Theory; Itsuno was the supervising director on that project. When discussing this decision, Itsuno said: "With DmC this time, we wanted to avoid the problem that befalls some series where you keep making it with the same team, same hardware, and it tends to decrease and fans move away from it... We don’t want the series to die." The development team included over ninety members, several of whom were from Capcom. Alex Jones and Motohide Eshiro acted as producers, aiming to help Ninja Theory make DmC play like the previous Devil May Cry games. Devil May Cry 5, was released in 2019.

Itsuno would return to direct Dragon's Dogma 2, which released in 2024.

=== Departure from Capcom and LightSpeed Japan Studio (2024–present) ===
On August 31, 2024, Itsuno announced on his Twitter that he was leaving Capcom after working at the company for 30 years and 5 months. He stated he was planning to start development of a new game in a new environment.

On November 12, 2024, Hideaki Itsuno joined LightSpeed Studios. Itsuno now leads LightSpeed Japan Studio, which operates in Tokyo and Osaka, focusing on developing original AAA action games.

== Works ==
Video games
Year	Title	Notes
1994	Quiz & Dragons: Capcom Quiz Game	Planner (Note: Japanese version only)
1995	Street Fighter Alpha	Planner
1996	Star Gladiator	Co-director
1997	Rival Schools: United By Fate	Co-director
1998	JoJo's Bizarre Adventure	Planner
1999	Power Stone	Co-director
2000	Power Stone 2	Director
2000	Capcom vs. SNK: Millennium Fight 2000	Planner
2000	Project Justice	Director
2000	Darkstalkers Chronicle: The Chaos Tower	Director
2001	One Piece Mansion	Director
2001	Capcom vs. SNK 2: Mark of the Millennium 2001	Director
2002	GioGio's Bizarre Adventure	Planner
2002	Auto Modellista	Director
2003	Devil May Cry 2	Replacement director (Note: Only on last 6 months of development)
2003	Shin Megami Tensei: Nocturne	Miscellaneous crew
2003	Resident Evil Outbreak	Special thanks
2004	Resident Evil Outbreak: File #2	Special thanks
2004	Capcom Fighting Evolution	Consultant
2005	Devil May Cry 3: Dante's Awakening	Director
2006	Devil May Cry 3: Special Edition	Director
2008	Devil May Cry 4	Director
2012	Dragon's Dogma	Director
2012	Project X Zone	Supervision & cooperation (Note: Devil May Cry series and Rival Schools series)
2013	DmC: Devil May Cry	Supervising director
2013	Dragon's Dogma: Dark Arisen	Executive producer
2015	DmC: Devil May Cry - Definitive Edition	Supervising director
2015	Devil May Cry 4: Special Edition	Director
2015	Project X Zone 2	Supervision & cooperation
2019	Devil May Cry 5	Director
2020	Devil May Cry 5: Special Edition	Director
2024	Dragon's Dogma 2	Director
