= Kazuma Kaneko =

Japanese video game artist and designer

- 金子 一馬
- Born: September 20, 1964 (age 62); Fukagawa, Tokyo, Japan
- Other name: Demon Artist
- Occupations: Video game artist, character designer
- Years active: 1988–present
- Employer(s): Atlus (1988–2014); Colopl (2023–present)
- Known for: Megami Tensei series

Kazuma Kaneko (金子 一馬, Kaneko Kazuma, born September 20, 1964) is a Japanese video game artist and designer for Japanese video game company Atlus. Kaneko is best known for his work in the Megami Tensei series of video games, acting as a character designer across multiple games. Kaneko is sometimes referred to as the "Demon Artist" due to his history of representing otherworldly and demonic forms in his art. During his professional career, Kaneko has also done freelance work for videogame companies Capcom and Konami, designing Dante and Vergil's Devil Trigger forms in the video game Devil May Cry 3, as well as designing the characters Inhert and Lloyd in Zone of the Enders: The 2nd Runner.

== Early life ==
Kaneko was born on September 20, 1964, in the neighborhood of Fukagawa, Tokyo, located in Tokyo, Japan. His parents owned a sushi shop where he would occasionally work at and his residence was located close to the property. As an only child, Kaneko spent a lot of time watching television (specifically kaiju shows and films like Kamen Rider) and studying mysterious anomalies, which further expanded into the analysis of religious literature and cultures.

== Career ==
Kaneko initially started off his professional career as an animator, but due to low pay rates across Japan, he was hesitant to continue. After playing the video game Digital Devil Story: Megami Tensei on the Nintendo Famicom, he was enthralled with how the game had a darker tone compared to other role-playing video games at the time and its interweaving of order and chaos. Kaneko then applied to and joined Atlus in 1988.

One of his first projects was working on the game King of Kings as a character designer, most notably designing the Lucifer demon featured in the game. Kaneko has stated that working on the project is what helped inspired his future designs for the Shin Megami Tensei series.

Whenever Kaneko made professional appearances on television and published interviews, he always wore black clothing with sunglasses to represent his dark personality and his interest in fashion, specifically influenced by the film Saturday Night Fever. He occasionally would be mistaken for a member of the Japanese yakuza.

Later in his career, Kaneko would act as a mentor to newcomer artist Shigenori Soejima, who joined Atlus in 1995 and would later take Kaneko's position as the acting art director for the company.

== Artistic process ==
Whenever Kaneko designs characters and demons for a game, he takes inspiration from all forms of mythology as well as artifacts left behind from ancient civilizations. Kaneko takes a lot of inspiration from particularly Native American mythology. Kaneko's artistic inspirations include various novels and manga, including Demon City Shinjuku Black Jack (manga), Lupin the Third, and mangakas like Go Nagai. Kaneko's character designs usually include modern day fashion and motifs that stray away from the standard fantasy trope in RPGs. This artistic decision was made to make the characters feel more relatable to players. Kaneko also considers the personality traits and backstories of characters during the design process which helps him decide on aspects such as the clothes they wear. Kaneko's demon designs take a more serious approach, where there is more focus on the historical context and mythologies of the figures being represented. Kaneko draws his designs on paper first, then transitions to scanning them onto a computer, where coloring and additional details are added. There were cases where Kaneko's designs would receive scrutiny from higher-ups at Nintendo, requesting him to censor certain aspects. At first, Kaneko struggled finding his own unique style and means of expression but eventually was able to solidify his artistic works.

== Notable works ==
Kaneko has been credited on working on a majority of Atlus' game catalog, as both a character designer and a scenario writer, but his personal favorite project to work on was the PlayStation 2 RPG Shin Megami Tensei III: Nocturne, a game he shares a deep connection with. After presenting the original concept behind Nocturne to Atlus staff, Kaneko acted as the character designer and worked as a co-producer along with Atlus founder Kouji Okada. Nocturne represented a turning point for not only Atlus, but Kaneko's artistic career as a whole.

The Vortex World represented within Nocturne was designed by Kaneko, and ties into the teachings of Gnosticism and cosmology.

== Works ==
Year	Game	Role(s)
1988	Erika to Satoru no Yume Bōken	Character design
1988	King of Kings	Character design
1990	Digital Devil Story: Megami Tensei II	Character and demon design
1990	Maniac Pro-Wrestling: Ashita e no Tatakai	Graphic design
1990	Cosmo Tank	Debugger
1991	Somer Assault	Character design
1991	Rockin' Kats	Game design
1992	Shin Megami Tensei	Character and demon design
1992	Megami Tensei Gaiden: Last Bible	Coordinator
1994	Shin Megami Tensei II	Character and demon design
1994	Majin Tensei	Coordinator
1994	Shin Megami Tensei If...	Character and demon design
1995	Kyūyaku Megami Tensei: Megami Tensei I ・II	Character design
1995	Shin Megami Tensei: Devil Summoner	Art director, Character and demon design
1996	Revelations: Persona	Art director, Character and demon design
1997	Giten Megami Tensei: Tokyo Mokushiroku	Character design
1997	Devil Summoner: Soul Hackers	Art director, Character and demon design
1999	Megami Tensei Gaiden: Last Bible II	GBC version; character design
1999	Persona 2: Innocent Sin	Art director, Character and demon design
1999	Maken X	Art director, character design
2000	Persona 2: Eternal Punishment	Art director, character and demon design
2000	Devil Children – Black Book and Red Book	Graphics supervisor
2001	Devil Children – White Book	Graphics supervisor
2001	Maken Shao: Demon Sword	Art director, character design
2002	DemiKids: Light Version and Dark Version	Graphics supervisor
2002	Shin Megami Tensei: Nine	Demon design
2003	Zone of the Enders: The 2nd Runner	"Inhert" and "Lloyd" designs
2003	Shin Megami Tensei III: Nocturne	Character and demon design
2003	Devil Children – Book of Fire and Book of Ice	Graphics supervisor
2004	Digital Devil Saga	Character and demon design
2005	Digital Devil Saga 2	Character and demon design
2005	Devil May Cry 3: Dante's Awakening	Devil Trigger designs
2005	3rd Super Robot Wars Alpha: To the End of the Galaxy	Mecha design
2005	Sangokushi Taisen	Character design
2006	Devil Summoner: Raidou Kuzunoha vs. The Soulless Army	Art director, character design, concept
2007	Shin Megami Tensei: Imagine	Demon design
2008	Devil Summoner 2: Raidou Kuzunoha vs. King Abaddon	Producer, art director, character design, concept
2009	Shin Megami Tensei: Devil Survivor	Supervisor, demon design
2009	Shin Megami Tensei: Persona	Art director
2009	Shin Megami Tensei: Strange Journey	Producer, character design, concept
2011	Shin Megami Tensei: Devil Survivor 2	Demon design
2013	Shin Megami Tensei IV	Scenario drafts
2016	Shin Megami Tensei IV: Apocalypse	Story setting
2016	Persona 5	Demon modeling supervisor
2024	Metaphor: ReFantazio	Demon design
2025	Tsukuyomi: The Divine Hunter	Character design
2026	Kazuma Kaneko's Tsukuyomi	Character design, concept
