= Devil May Cry =

Japanese media franchise

- Genres: Action-adventure; Hack and slash
- Developers: Capcom (2001–present); Ninja Theory (2013)
- Publisher: Capcom
- Creator: Hideki Kamiya
- Platforms: Android; iOS; Windows; Mobile; Nintendo Switch; Nintendo Switch 2; PlayStation 2; PlayStation 3; PlayStation 4; PlayStation 5; Shield Android TV; Xbox 360; Xbox One; Xbox Series X/S
- First release: Devil May Cry; August 23, 2001
- Latest release: Devil May Cry: Peak of Combat; January 10, 2024

Devil May Cry (Note: Japanese: デビル メイ クライ, Hepburn: Debiru Mei Kurai) is an action-adventure game franchise created by Hideki Kamiya, and succeeded by Hideaki Itsuno for every game after the first until Devil May Cry 5. The hack and slash series introduced the new subgenre of character action games that ranked style used in combat. It is primarily developed and published by Capcom. The series centers on the demon hunter Dante and his efforts to thwart various demon invasions of Earth. Its gameplay consists of combat scenarios in which the player must attempt to extend long chains of attacks, avoid damage, utilise taunts and exhibit stylised combat by varying their attacks to express creative, freestyled action choreography in real time; this combat, along with time and the number of currencies collected and consumables used, are considered in grading the player's performance from rank D to S.

The series alludes to Italian poet Dante's Divine Comedy. Hideki Kamiya created Devil May Cry after a failed attempt to develop a Resident Evil game, with the first game originally being conceived as Resident Evil 4. Kamiya wanted to create a game with more action features, which Capcom felt the series did not need, but still showed confidence in the end product as standalone. The later games were directed by Hideaki Itsuno and writer Bingo Morihashi.

In 2010, Capcom announced a new game, DmC: Devil May Cry (developed by Ninja Theory and supervised by Capcom), during the Tokyo Game Show that year. A high-definition remastering of the three PlayStation 2 titles was compiled in the Devil May Cry HD Collection and released for PlayStation 3 and Xbox 360 in 2012, and in 2018 for the PlayStation 4, Windows, and Xbox One. The remasters were released as standalone titles for Nintendo Switch between 2019 and 2020, with Devil May Cry 3 receiving exclusive new modes on the platform to modernize it. The latest game is Devil May Cry 5, released on March 8, 2019.

The series has been successful; the main entries have sold 41 million copies worldwide and received Capcom's Platinum Title award. The success of the video-game series has led to comic books, novelizations, two animated series (a canonical anime and a Netflix standalone series), guides, collectibles, publications, and a variety of action figures, as well as crossovers into other franchises, most notably Marvel vs. Capcom and Punishing: Grey Raven.

== Games ==
Release timeline
2001	Devil May Cry
2002
2003	Devil May Cry 2
2003	Devil May Cry: Deadshot
2004
2005	Devil May Cry 3: Dante's Awakening
2006	Devil May Cry 3: Special Edition
2007	Devil May Cry (mobile)
2008	Devil May Cry (mobile)
2008	Devil May Cry 4
2009–2011
2012	Devil May Cry HD Collection (PS3, Xbox 360)
2013	DmC: Devil May Cry
2014
2015	DmC: Devil May Cry Definitive Edition
2015	Devil May Cry 4: Special Edition
2016–2017
2018	Devil May Cry HD Collection (PS4, Xbox One, PC)
2019	Devil May Cry 5
2020	Devil May Cry 5: Special Edition
2021–2023
2024	Devil May Cry: Peak of Combat

- Devil May Cry: Players assume the role of Dante, a skilled demon hunter. The gameplay focuses on fast-paced, highly stylized combat; a high style ranking requires long attack and evasion strings while avoiding damage. Although the game also features puzzle-solving and exploration elements retained from its survival-horror origins, they are downplayed in favor of action. In later games, the system was modified; players had to vary their attacks to maintain their style rank. The Devil Trigger, a mainstay ability of the entire series, enables a player's character to temporarily assume a devilish form with additional powers (based on their current weapon), while the character's speed and attack strength increase, and health is slowly restored.
- Devil May Cry 2: Dante is generally the game's lead character. Two other playable characters, Lucia and Trish are also available. The ability to perform combination attacks in mid-air and evasion and weapon-change buttons were introduced. With the latter, a player can cycle through 2 equipped ranged weapons without switching to the inventory screen. The game also introduced the fan favorite mode, "Bloody Palace", to the series.
- Devil May Cry: Deadshot: A shooter game released for Japanese feature phones in 2003. It is set in an old castle on a deserted island.
- Devil May Cry 3: Dante's Awakening: The main character Dante can swap between a variety of weapons and fighting styles, allowing the player to focus on favorite techniques or weapons. Each of the four styles gains experience points when used, which unlock more techniques and abilities without costing red orbs (the series' currency). A second weapon-change button was added, allowing the player to cycle through a character's melee weaponry. The game was re-released as Devil May Cry 3: Special Edition with new skills for Dante and the ability to play as Vergil.
- Devil May Cry: Two different mobile games for feature phones were released in 2007–2008. One has similar gameplay to Devil May Cry 3 and uses enemies and characters from that game. It is also known by the title Devil May Cry: Dante X Vergil. The other one is a 2D side-scrolling beat 'em up.
- Devil May Cry 4: This entry introduces a new protagonist, Nero, who is playable alongside the returning Dante. Nero's Devil Bringer arm gives players the ability to pull enemies toward him or himself toward enemies (depends on enemies), perform context-specific attacks or parries, and use grapple points. Nero is also armed with a Sword Called "Red Queen" which can be Revved up to three slots, allowing players to Pre-Rev those slots to cause extra damage on the next hit, and gain bonus "style points" toward their ranking; with precise timing, those Slots can be Revved with each attack. As Dante, players can switch weapons and fighting styles mid-combat, allowing for more varied and unique combos. The game was re-released as Devil May Cry 4: Special Edition in 2015, featuring the ability to play as Vergil as well as returning characters Lady and Trish.
- Devil May Cry HD Collection: A collection of the series' first three games for the PlayStation 3 and Xbox 360, ported by Pipeworks Software and Double Helix Games, eventually released on March 22, 2012, in Japan and March 29, 2012, in the US. It was later ported to the PlayStation 4, Windows, and Xbox One on March 13, 2018.
- DmC: Devil May Cry: This attempted reboot of the series introduced a new continuity in which the player character Dante and his twin brother Vergil are Nephilim, descendants of an angel and a demon parent. The player could alternate between Angel Mode and Demon mode with specific weapons and enhanced traversal abilities. Further options for accessing hidden areas included the Ophion whip and grappling hook. The gameplay takes place partially in Limbo, a parallel world inhabited by demons, that occasionally intersects with the normal world, changing its architecture and infrastructure to a more hostile form, prompting fast-paced chase sequences and platforming scenarios. The game takes place in an urban fantasy setting, inspired by contemporary Western cities, as opposed to the fantastical, Renaissance-themed environments of the other games in the series. The story also touches on criticism of themes of mass media and consumerism. The game has since had its plans of continuation abandoned, with the game itself now being treated as an alternate story to the classic games own story.
- Devil May Cry 5: This game follows the original continuity from Devil May Cry 4. It again features Nero and Dante as playable characters, as well as a new character named V. Nero's Devil Bringer arm is replaced with a selection of swappable cybernetic arms dubbed Devil Breakers, each one featuring distinct gameplay mechanics. V remotely commands three demons in battle due to his weak physical state. The game was re-released as Devil May Cry 5: Special Edition, featuring the ability to play as Vergil.
- Devil May Cry: Peak of Combat: A mobile-phone game by Yunchang Games, based on Devil May Cry 3. Its rendition of Dante's appearance was criticized, and the developers promised to fix it when the game left the beta period for release in 2020.

== Plot ==
The events of the series begin two millennia before the first game with the demon Sparda, the Black Knight, defeating Demon World ruler Mundus. Sparda stops Mundus from conquering the human world by sealing several Hellgates and Temen-Ni-Gru (the last gate) with a ritual requiring his blood and the aid of a human priestess. Sparda meets Eva, who gives birth to his twin sons Dante and Vergil.

The plot begins with Devil May Cry 3, a year after Dante has a falling-out with Vergil. A large tower erupts from the ground near the shop where Dante works as a mercenary devil hunter and Dante interprets it as a challenge from Vergil. Dante is defeated in Temen-Ni-Gru by Vergil, who takes his locket and leaves with Arkham. Dante's dormant devil power revives him, and he resumes pursuing his brother. Vergil wants to use the pendants their mother gave them in a ritual to create a portal to the Demon World. The battle is joined by Lady, who wants to avenge her mother's death by Arkham; Arkham manipulated the three into completing the ritual, which would allow him to acquire Sparda's sword: the Force Edge. Dante and Vergil defeat him, and resume battling each other. The portal begins to close, and Vergil approaches it. Dante pleads with his brother not to go, but Vergil leaps into the Demon World before the portal closes. Vergil is tested and encounters Mundus, his mother's killer, battling him with his sword Yamato, a magical katana with the power to open portals in space and separate worlds, which once belonged to Sparda. When Lady returns to the human world, she muses on the nature of devils and humans, coining the phrase "devil may cry" in relation to the nature of a loving heart. Dante decides to use it as the name for the shop.

Dante is confronted in Devil May Cry by Trish, who reveals that Mundus is planning to return and only a descendant of Sparda can defeat him. He explores Mallet Island (where Mundus is set to return), encountering demons which include Mundus' general: the undead Vergil, Nelo Angelo. As Dante approaches Mundus, he falls into a trap which reveals that Trish is the demon's agent; he saves her, however, because she resembles his mother. Trish saves Dante from Mundus, and Dante realizes his father's power. Dante defeats Mundus when Trish helps him return Mundus to the Demon World. Dante and Trish escape as the island collapses by using a biplane and end up working together in the Devil May Cry shop, now renamed Devil Never Cry.

In the Devil May Cry: The Animated Series anime, Trish is a demon hunter; Dante is the bodyguard of Patty, a young heiress who becomes obsessed with him. Patty's mother is descended from a sorcerer who sealed the power of Abigail, an ancient devil lord. Patty is targeted by Sid, a demon seeking Abigail's power. Lady and Trish fight demons summoned by Sid, and Dante kills him.

Dante is invited by Lucia in Devil May Cry 2 to meet her mother, Matier. Dante learns that Arius is collecting artifacts, called Arcana, to summon the demon lord Argosax to absorb and gain his power. Dante flips a coin, and decides to help. Lucia confronts Arius, who reveals that he created her. Lucia gives Dante the last of the Arcana to give to Matier before facing Arius alone. Dante finds Matier, who asks him to take the gathered Arcana to save Lucia from Arius, He Flips a coin, and accepts her request. Lucia attacks Arius, but he captures her. Dante arrives, trades the Arcana for Lucia, and attacks Arius (who escapes). As Arius Tries to Summon Argosax, It Fails as it is Revealed by Dante that he Swapped one of the Arcana for a fake. In rage Arius Attacks Dante But loses, In his final moments he cries about how close he was to becoming a king, Dante shoots him with gunfire, blasting him out of the tower killing him. Dante meets up with Lucia outside the tower, In fear of becoming a monster She Asks Dante to kill her, But before Dante makes a decision, A stream of energy strikes the Ouroboros tower, and a portal to the demon world opens. Dante and Lucia argue about who will enter, and Dante flips a coin to determine who will go, And Dante goes to enter the Demon world. Before Dante leaves He gives His Coin to Lucia to take care of in his absence, Arius returns to the human world and Lucia defeats him.

In Devil May Cry 4, Dante and Trish discover a dark conspiracy within the Order of the Sword and investigate while learning of its religious leader named Sanctus and his plans to conquer the world using demonic power. Dante seemingly assassinates Sanctus, only to face a young holy knight named Nero, who had awakened his demonic abilities as a descendant of Sparda. Nero is sent by Credo to capture Dante, obtaining the katana Yamato along the way, only to learn the Order's dark secrets. Consequently, Nero and his girlfriend Kyrie are captured to further the Order's goals of conquest. Dante's effort to cripple Sanctus' plans culminates in freeing Nero, who finally confronts and defeats Sanctus before rescuing Kyrie. The two demon hunters part ways on good terms as Dante entrusts Nero with the Yamato.

In Devil May Cry 5, set several years after Devil May Cry 4, Nero runs a mobile branch of Dante's Devil May Cry business. He befriends Nico, Agnus's Abandoned Daughter who's a weapon-making artist and descendant of Nell Goldstein; the gunsmith who crafted Dante's Ebony and Ivory handguns. Nero's Devil Bringer arm from Devil May Cry 4 is stolen; armed with prosthetic Devil Breakers created by Nico, he leaves with Dante and the demon hunter V to face their "strongest foe yet".

Although the series' timeline had placed Devil May Cry 4 before Devil May Cry 2, it was retconned with the release of Devil May Cry 5. DmC: Devil May Cry, developed by Ninja Theory, is not part of the timeline and takes place in an alternate universe from the main series. Paired with a very different Dante, Personality and appearance wise, it moves away from the gothic look of the previous games to a more contemporary setting with some social commentary on mass media and culture.

== Development ==
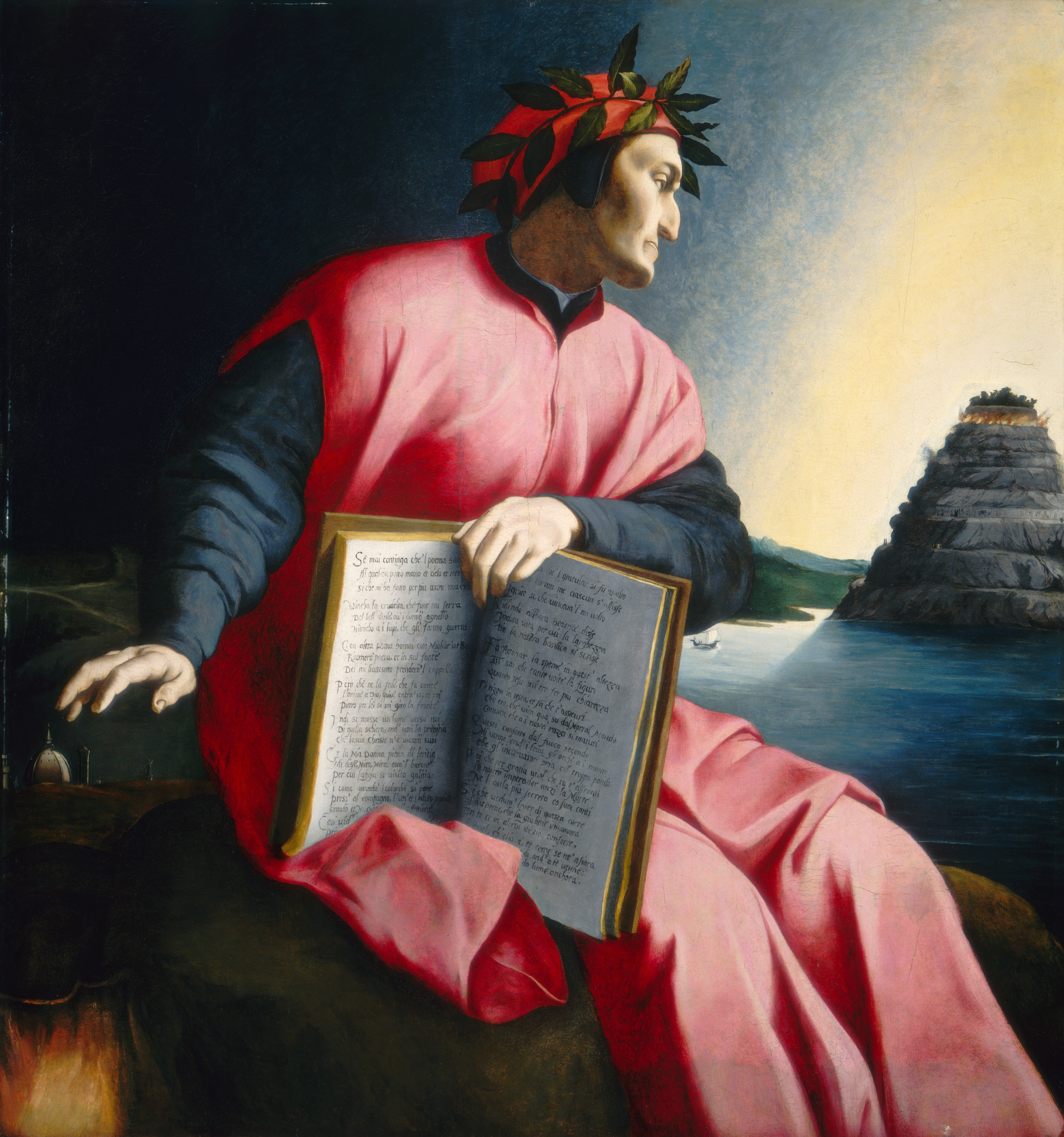
The series is loosely based on the Divine Comedy by Dante Alighieri (pictured).

After the completion of Resident Evil 2 in 1998, preliminary work on a PlayStation 2 installment of the Resident Evil series began by Team Little Devil under the direction of Hideki Kamiya. Early research and development included a trip to Spain to examine castles as a basis for the game's environments. Its prototype, however, was a radical departure from the Resident Evil formula and the survival horror genre. Kamiya rewrote the story and changed its premise, drawing from Italian poet Dante Alighieri's Divine Comedy for Devil May Cry.

Strider, another Capcom franchise, is cited as a vital influence on the Devil May Cry games and their action, particularly in their inclusion of the "boss rush".

Despite the success of the original game, its sequel was not created by Kamiya or Team Little Devils. Although an unidentified director was placed in charge of the project, Capcom was dissatisfied with their work and assigned Hideaki Itsuno "with only 4 to 5 months remaining in development" to steer the project back on course. Despite Itsuno's limited time on the project, he is the only person credited as director in the final version of the game. According to producer Tsuyoshi Tanaka, the design aim was to make Devil May Cry 2 bigger than its predecessor; Tanaka estimated that the game's environments were about nine times larger than the first.

After Devil May Cry 2's mixed reception, Capcom decided to develop the next game like the more critically successful Devil May Cry. Gameplay elements, such as environment size and battle engine, were reconsidered. In the original game, Vergil was killed by demons early and his soul was controlled by Mundus; Bingo Morihashi wanted to create an alternate universe in which Vergil was alive. However, Kamiya gave Morihashi the freedom to rework Vergil's backstory and make him a living teenager for Devil May Cry 3. As a result, the game was designed as a prequel to the series, set several years before the events of the first game.

Development of Devil May Cry 4 began shortly after its predecessor's success. The development team had 80 members. A new protagonist was discussed many times at Capcom, but was not approved until producer Hiroyuki Kobayashi said that Dante had to be in the game. Kobashi said before the game's release that they wanted to make Dante seem significantly more powerful than Nero, to create an obvious difference between the strength of a "veteran" compared to a "rookie". Writer Morihashi collaborated with film director Yuji Shimomura, who worked on the earlier games. Morihashi left Capcom at one point, but returned at Itsuno's request. It took him a year to finish writing the game; he had difficulty with the characterization of Nero, the new protagonist. Dante returned as a supporting character.

Although the fourth game was a commercial and critical success, the staff considered rebooting the series because other game series had better sales. They chose Ninja Theory, impressed with their work on Heavenly Sword (which the staff thought would work with a Devil May Cry game). However, in 2013 Itsuno expressed interest in developing a fifth installment. It was originally thought that Itsuno intended for the series to go on hiatus or end if Devil May Cry 4: Special Edition was not a commercial success, but he said in a GameSpot interview that the series' future did not depend on Devil May Cry 4: Special Edition's sales. He alleviated fears that DmC: Devil May Cry's sales would kill the series, confirming that Capcom was satisfied with them. In mid-January 2016, Itsuno tweeted that he had begun work on a new project. Reuben Langdon and Johnny Yong Bosch, who had done voice acting and motion capture for Dante and Nero in Devil May Cry 4, took pictures of themselves in motion-capture gear in March 2016; this led to speculation that a new Devil May Cry game was in development. According to Capcom Vancouver, "It's not a game that [they] announced that [they are] working on at [their] studio". On May 17, 2018, the domain name "DevilMayCry5.com" was registered under Capcom's Onamae domain register.

Devil May Cry 5, featuring the return of Dante and Nero, was confirmed at E3 2018 for release the following year. Most of the team had worked on the recently released Resident Evil 7, and were experienced with the game engine; Itsuno was influenced by his work in Monster Hunter: World to provide content appealing to new gamers but also felt that making the game challenging would appeal to long-time fans. Other members of the staff had worked on the reboot game DmC: Devil May Cry, but the Osaka team was more willing to make a sequel to the fourth installment of the main series. The team listened to fan opinions about previous games to ensure that the new game appealed to them; an "auto" mode facilitated combos. Itsuno was moved to tears by a film in which three robots combined into a giant robot to overcome their foe, and wanted to create similar moments. He wanted to convey the style of a Hollywood movie such as Marvel's Avengers series. In November 2017, Kamiya expressed interest in making a remake of the first installment and a crossover game with Dante and Bayonetta.

== Other media ==
=== Light novels ===
The series has several print adaptations. Two Devil May Cry light novels, written by Shinya Goikeda and illustrated by Shirow Miwa, were published in Japan in 2002 and translated and published in the United States in 2006. The first, Devil May Cry Volume 1, was published in Japan in conjunction with the release of the first game and explored Dante in an adventure set before the game's events. The second, entitled Devil May Cry Volume 2 in the US, was published in Japan to coincide with the second game's release and is set after the first game's events. Tokyopop published the books in the United States in June and November 2006, respectively.

Bingo Morihashi wrote a Devil May Cry 4 novel entitled Devil May Cry 4 Deadly Fortune. The two-volume novel, published in Japan in 2009, has a number of scenes which were not included in the original game due to time constraints. A prequel novel by Morihashi titled Before the Nightmare, set before Devil May Cry 5 and leading to the beginning of the game, was published on March 1, 2019.

=== Comics and manga ===
Three issues of a comic adaptation of the first game were published by the Canadian Dreamwave Productions in 2004, but the series was left unfinished when the company went bankrupt the following year. On July 25, 2008, WildStorm (a DC Comics imprint) and Capcom announced that they would collaborate on a Devil May Cry comic-book series. Details about the series were planned to be announced at a later date, but no new information has been provided.

Two volumes of a planned three-part Devil May Cry 3 manga series have been published in Japan and the United States. Set a year before the events of Devil May Cry 3, the manga describes how the characters come to be at the beginning of the game.

On March 7, 2019, Capcom announced that a tie-in manga entitled Devil May Cry 5 Visions of V would be serialised on the Japanese manga-hosting site Line Manga (LINE マンガ). The manga's prologue was published before the serialisation began. Illustrated by Tomio Ogata, the manga (only available in Japan) would update every other Sunday beginning on April 27 until May 22, 2021, where the release schedule was changed to monthly publication to maintain quality, the manga published its final chapter on March 19, 2022.

=== Animation ===
==== Anime ====
An anime series, Devil May Cry: The Animated Series, premiered on Japan's Wowow TV network on June 12, 2007. The 12-episode series, produced by Madhouse, was directed by Shin Itagaki. Bingo Morihashi, a writer of the third and fourth games, was one of its writers.

==== Animated series ====
In November 2018, Adi Shankar announced that he had acquired the rights to produce a Devil May Cry animated series for Netflix. Shankar, who has been completing a similar animated series for Konami's Castlevania franchise, said that he considered both series part of a shared "Bootleg Multiverse".

In November 2021, Shankar revealed that the show's first season will have 8 episodes. He also has plans for a connected "multi-season arc", like what he did with Castlevania, and that fan-favorite characters will make their debut throughout the series. In September 2024, Netflix announced that the series would premiere in April 2025. The first season premiered on April 3, 2025. The series was renewed for a second season shortly thereafter, which released on May 12, 2026. In June 2026, the series was renewed for a third and final season.

=== Film ===
On June 2, 2003, Capcom and Japanese film company GAGA Communications announced a licensing agreement to develop a live-action Hollywood film based on the Devil May Cry series. GAGA planned to develop the film as a Hollywood blockbuster, with a proposed production budget of approximately $40 million and filming targeted to begin in 2005. The proposed film was intended to feature Dante and Trish and reflect the original games. At the time of the announcement, no director, producer, distributor, or cast had been selected.

The project was never produced. No director, cast, screenplay, or production start was publicly announced, and the proposed 2005 filming date passed without the film entering production.

On February 28, 2011, Screen Gems (which made Resident Evil into a film series) had purchased feature-film rights to the Devil May Cry series. Kyle Ward was hired to write the screenplay for the film (based on DmC: Devil May Cry), which would be Dante's origin story. No news has emerged about the project's status.

=== Plays ===
Capcom produced Sengoku Basara vs. Devil May Cry a staged amalgam of the Devil May Cry and Sengoku Basara series, in August 2015. In the play, Dante, Lady, Trish, and Vergil encounter mysterious historical ruins while chasing a devil and are sent back in time to Japan's Warring States period. There, they meet Date Masamune, Sanada Yukimura, and other characters from the Sengoku Basara franchise. The play ran at the AiiA 2.5 Theater in Tokyo for 18 performances. Masanari Ujigawa wrote and directed the play, and Hideaki Itsuno and Izaki Matsuno collaborated on the scenery. Kazushi Miyakoda and Tetsuya Yamaura were the producers, supervised by Hiroyuki Kobayashi and Makoto Yamamoto.

Devil May Cry: The Live Hacker, a musical, ran for 13 performances in March 2019 at Zepp DiverCity in Tokyo. Jun Yoriko wrote and directed the musical and its video, and a DVD was released in late August of that year.

=== Soundtracks ===
The Devil May Cry series has seen the release of seven separate soundtracks. Initially, Capcom was very reluctant to release an officially sanctioned soundtrack for the Devil May Cry series, due to worries that the products would sell poorly. As a means of testing the market, Capcom decided to ask for pre-release sales.

== In other games ==
Devil May Cry characters appear in the PlayStation versions of the Viewtiful Joe games, another Capcom series created by Hideki Kamiya; Dante is a playable character in the PlayStation 2 port of the first Viewtiful Joe. The PSP version of Viewtiful Joe: Red Hot Rumble also includes Dante and costumes based on Vergil, Trish, Sparda, Marionette, and Plasma.

In a deal between Capcom and Atlus, Megami Tensei character designer Kazuma Kaneko created Dante and Vergil's demonic forms in Devil May Cry 3. In return, Atlus included Dante in his Devil May Cry 2 costume as a character in an enhanced release of Shin Megami Tensei: Nocturne (Maniax in Japan). The English localization of Nocturne was based on the game's Maniax edition.

Dante and Trish are playable characters in Marvel vs. Capcom 3: Fate of Two Worlds, and Vergil, Dante, and Trish are playable characters in its Ultimate Marvel vs. Capcom 3 update. Dante and Vergil retain their Kazuma Kaneko-designed Devil Trigger forms since they are based on the third game of the Devil May Cry series. Dante is also a playable character in Marvel vs. Capcom: Infinite.

The DmC: Devil May Cry version of Dante is a playable character in PlayStation All-Stars Battle Royale, and he is a playable character in Project X Zone for the Nintendo 3DS as half of a pair with Darkstalkers' Demitri Maximoff; Lady is a separate character. Dante returns in its sequel, Project X Zone 2, with Vergil; Vergil's future self, Nelo Angelo, is a rival character.

On June 28, 2021, it was announced that a Mii costume based on Dante would appear in the crossover fighting game Super Smash Bros. Ultimate, as a set for the Mii Sword fighter character with clothing inspired by his design from the original Devil May Cry game. The set was released the following day alongside the game's new DLC fighter, Kazuya Mishima from the Tekken series.

== Reception ==
Aggregate review scores As of March 11, 2019.
Game	Metacritic	OpenCritic
Devil May Cry	(PS2) 94	—
Devil May Cry 2	(PS2) 68	—
Devil May Cry 3: Dante's Awakening	(PS2) 87 (PC) 66	—
Devil May Cry 4	(PS3) 84 (X360) 84 (PC) 78	—
DmC: Devil May Cry	(X360) 86 (PS3) 85 (PC) 85	—
Devil May Cry 5	(PC) 89 (PS4) 88 (XONE) 87	88% recommend

By December 31, 2025, the Devil May Cry series has sold 38 million units worldwide; each installment is a Capcom Platinum Title, selling over a million units. As of December 31, 2024, Devil May Cry 5 is the best-selling game in the series having sold approximately 10 million units worldwide through the combined sales of the Standard and Special Edition .

The series has received generally positive reviews. In 2010, IGN ranked Devil May Cry number 42 and Devil May Cry 3 number 18 on its "Top 100 PlayStation 2 Games" list. The series' gameplay has been praised as innovative. Devil May Cry has been cited as beginning a subgenre of "extreme combat" action games, which focus on powerful heroes fighting hordes of foes with stylized action. It has been described as the first game that "successfully captured the twitch-based, relentlessly free-flowing gameplay style of so many classic 2D action games". The series is the standard against which other 3D hack and slash action games are measured, with comparisons in reviews of games such as God of War, Chaos Legion, and Blood Will Tell. Devil May Cry 5 has three protagonists with distinctive abilities, increasing the number of moves available. According to Hiroyuki Kobayashi, the team's work on Devil May Cry 4 influenced Capcom's Dragon's Dogma.

Response to the series' narrative has been mixed, despite Dante's increased popularity. The series' popularity led to a line of Devil May Cry action figures produced by Toycom, and Kaiyodo produced a Devil May Cry 2 and Devil May Cry 3 Dante action figure.

According to a Gamecritics.com reviewer, the story was overly short and the characters underdeveloped. Dante's cockiness was noted as largely absent from Devil May Cry 2.

Devil May Cry 3 and its relationships among the cast in the narrative were found to be superior to Kamiya's original version. Dante's dynamic with Nero in the following game was praised, with critics saying that neither overshadowed the other. Devil May Cry 5's handling of its characters and their connections was well received.

Although well received by most critics, DmC: Devil May Cry was highly controversial with many long time fans due to the dramatic change in Dante's appearance and the move away from the series' iconic gothic style to a modern urban setting, as well as the general quality of the story's writing, Paired with the Remake's adaptation of Dante and Vergil's character.
