= King of Kings (1988 video game) =

- Cover art
- Developer: Atlus
- Publisher: Namco
- Artist: Kazuma Kaneko
- Composer: Hirohiko Takayama
- Platform: Family Computer
- Release: JP: December 9, 1988
- Genre: Turn-based strategy wargame
- Modes: Single-player, multiplayer

King of Kings (キングオブキングス) is a 1988 turn-based strategy video game with wargaming elements developed by Atlus and published by Namco for the Family Computer only in Japan. Kazuma Kaneko helped to design the characters for this video game, which became the inspiration for the characters in the video game Megami Tensei.

It is one of the few games for the Family Computer to use the Namco 163 wavetable sound chip, and is also one of the games that enables all eight sound channels provided by the chip, the other being Erika to Satoru no Yume Bōken.

== Summary ==
King of Kings features 22 different types of playable units (categorized into people, fairies, dragons and other kinds of units). Human units tend to have a weak overall defense, fairy units are often the least expensive to produce, all dragons except the lizardmen are very expensive to build, and the other units combine the strengths and weaknesses of the other three kinds of units. There is a campaign mode where the player does battle against a computer team led by Lucifer across four maps. There is a multiplayer mode where up to four teams can battle on eight additional maps. A bonus map based on Japan's greatest swordsmith Masamune is present as an Easter egg in this video game.

=== Game system ===
The players king's unit is the axis of the game while the opponent's king can easily defeat the player's chance for victory. Players must do operations such as occupation and city funding. Kings can produce other units to conduct aggressive behavior. They are several types of units including fighters and goblins. Each unit's attack and defensive powers are different. In multiplayer mode, the unnamed "alliance" exists among allies battle but an allied victory is not achievable. Only defeating the opposing king(s) will result in a victory for the player. If the player is playing against more than one human opponent, it is possible for teams to enjoy the game alliance system.

=== Production system ===
Players create production systems by putting a King unit inside the castle to summon other units. The production unit is a system that consumes funds and also creates a certain amount of revenue each time a player's turn comes up. Players can increase revenue by occupying the town and castle. The King unit can move to the castle immediately after producing a unit. He can also advance to the attack; he is considered to be outside the castle and is unable to produce.

=== Unit ===
The possible fighter units in the game are goblins, elves and dragons. These characters are central to fantasy games and appear in the game. Each unit has set level, which is increased by killing enemy units. Levels range from 1 to 9 (with the ninth level character wearing a crown). It is important to have a higher attack rating than the opponent. On the other hand, having a higher defense rating also helps to win battles and to create a balanced game system. Some units can use "magic" that turns directly attack enemy units with various special effects. The campaign mode is limited to the type of units than can be produced. These types start off as being less productive, but more types of units will be added in the second half of the game.

=== Movement system ===
All units have a predetermined moving pattern. Respectively, units can only advance within its movement range that is allowed by the game. Movement is also consumed by topography; plains and roads need less power while high mountains and forests consume more. Food is consumed in order to regain movement points. All units consume food in order to keep moving. After running out of food, only a city or a monk can restore the unit's supply of food. Therefore, players must consider maintaining the supply line during the invasion.

== Development ==
A reviewer in Marukatsu Famicom described King of Kings as being the second part of a wave of strategy games for the Family Computer. The first were ports of games being made for home computers and the second being original games for the console.

== Reception ==
Reception

Review score
Publication	Score
Marukatsu Famicom	6/10, 8/10, 7/10, 7/10, 8/10

In Marukatsu Famicom, two reviewers complimented King of Kings with one saying it a had a lot of gameplay depth and could be played for many hours while another said that due to its fantasy setting, it had a lot of new rules to learn but said once they were learned the game became incredibly fun. Another reviewer said they found they could not immerse themselves in the fantasy setting of the game which felt more like medieval Europe to them and said that the enemy's AI was not very well thought out.

== See also ==
- Namco Anthology (volume 2), featured in this PlayStation game compilation released in 1998.
