= Devil May Cry 3 (manga) =

Manga series

- Manga

Devil May Cry 3
- Written by: Suguro Chayamachi
- English publisher: AUS: Madman Entertainment; NA: Tokyopop
- Original run: October 11, 2005 – August 8, 2006
- Volumes: 2

Devil May Cry 3 (デビル メイ クライ 3) is a manga series based on the best selling video game Devil May Cry 3: Dante's Awakening was released in Japan and later an English translation was released in 2005. The manga is divided into three parts, Code 1: Dante, Code 2: Vergil, and the (never) to-be released Code 3: Lady. The plot of the manga centers on the events that happened one year before Devil May Cry 3, it explains how the conflict between Dante and his brother Vergil started and how the game's characters were introduced to each other. Code 1: Dante explores the storyline from Dante's point of view, it introduces the main characters. It explains how Vergil and Arkham meet and how they formed an alliance. Dante is first introduced as a mercenary willing to take any job that offers a good reward, eventually revealing that the reason behind this is a desire to avenge the death of his mother by slaying those that killed her. Code 2: Vergil introduces the Temen-ni-gru a structure that holds the door to the demonic realm and it follows Vergil and Arkham on their quest to unseal the door to it. It illustrates the moment when Dante's demonic powers began awakening.

== Plot ==
=== Code 1: Dante ===
The story begins as Enzo enters Dante's still unnamed office, and offers Dante a job of rescuing a girl by the name of "Alice" for a $4,000,000 reward, an uninterested Dante tells Enzo to leave the shop. Dante then proceeds to look for Enzo to accept this job, only to find him in the process of being attacked by a group of sand creatures while in a brothel, and is subsequently rescued by Dante. The scene jumps to a library and the reader is introduced to two new characters, Vergil and Arkham. Arkham approaches Vergil while he is scanning a bookcase for a book. While Arkham tries to gain Vergil's attention by interpreting the legend of Sparda, Vergil effortlessly proceeds to slay a library attendant, revealing her to be a demon. The scene fades as Arkham incites Vergil to tell him the truth behind the legend. Dante is next seen standing outside a seemingly deserted mansion. After threatening and driving away Enzo, Dante enters the mansion through the second floor window, in that room he finds Alice sitting in a chair. Alice is afterwards revealed to be a demon as she proceeds to attack him. After asserting that the now dead demon is not Alice, Dante is next seen as he finds a photo of a young Mary. Meanwhile, Vergil walks aimlessly through the rain effortlessly slaying a gang of humans after their leader chastises him and attempted to take hold of his sword. He finds a drunken Enzo sitting outside of a building, who mistakes him for Dante, Vergil figures out his brother is present in that town and proceeds to look for him. Caught in the midst of Dante's fire, a possessed doll whom Alice refers to as Rabi leads Dante to the true Alice, who refuses to leave without Rabi. As a bell tolls three o'clock, Rabi announces that it is teatime. Dante then encounters a demon resembling the Mad Hatter, who states he has Alice and is not willing to give her back, seated at a floating table with Rabi and a platter upon which is a lid, opened to reveal the head of another demon Alice and after a discussion between said demon and Dante it is exterminated. The Hatter-like demon and Rabi now alert Dante of Vergil's return, only to be found an illusion when Dante shoots at them. He then proceeds to slay a cat-like demon (a possible avatar for the Cheshire Cat). Rabi, shielding Dante from the needle-like remains of the cat demon, then reveals that it was he who gave Dante the job and admits that it was a cover to see Sparda's heir in action. Alice's demonic form is subsequently revealed after turning into a beautiful woman, though Dante reverses this. Dante leaves the mansion after being informed that his payment has been wired to his liaison and refusing to sell his amulet, passing Vergil in a hall, though unnoticed by Dante until he disappears Vergil slays Rabi after he explains the significance of Dante's cooperation and is seen leaving the mansion at the end of the book, meeting a sobbing Alice in the process. After angrily confronting Enzo in functioning Love Planet (unlike the ruins seen in the game), Dante is next seen dreaming of the attack that killed his mother and separated him from his brother, who was also presumed dead. Soon after awakening a determined Dante is seen leaving the establishment with Rebellion, a sword given to him by his late father, in hand.

=== Code 2: Vergil ===
This chapter begins with Vergil and Arkham arriving at the entrance to one of the seals of the Temen-ni-gru. Arkham explained the nature of the structure to Vergil and proceeded to suggest an alliance. Arkham proceeds to explain that the demons sealed by Sparda were bound by large rune-covered spikes; to release them, it was required that Vergil give them one thing; their names. Before Arkham had time to finish his explanation, the sealed demon takes hold of Vergil's consciousness. Vergil finds himself in a graveyard as a child surrounded by countless demonic skeletons. After losing hold of Yamato and being perilously injured, he uses his demonic strength to break free and destroy the army of skeletons. As Vergil realizes their message he regains control of his body and removes the statues head, before letting it choose its own name. The demon chooses the name Goumon (meaning pride), and the seal is broken, freeing the demon.

The action then jumps to Dante, out on the streets as he is being attacked by a group of demons. He quickly dispatches them and proceeds to visit a bar, where the bartender proceeds to make him a pizza and inform him of various murders that seemed to be committed by the same person, and asks that Dante investigate it; when Dante states his disinterest, the bartender takes his pizza back. Enzo shows up immediately afterward and begs Dante to help him with the client Dante canceled on, professing that he will be killed if Dante refuses. When Dante says he'll help, he leaves. Mary, who was in the bar with a drunken and unconscious friend, asks for and is granted permission to let her friend stay. Meanwhile, a frustrated Vergil tries to decipher a book containing ancient accounts of the legend of Sparda. He is summoned by Arkham to the basement of the mansion, where Arkham reveals that he was able to locate one of the seals necessary to open the gate to the demon world. However, they are unsure of just how many more seals there are, as the texts only mention four despite the first seal having mentioned seven. Vergil decides to destroy the ones they do know of, while Arkham researches the rest. In the meantime, Mary, on her way home, encounters Alice wandering around the city. Alice guides her to Dante's establishment. When Dante arrives Alice attacks him and steals the amulet that was a gift from Dante's mother. He follows her to a church where he encounters the Mad Hatter demon that he encountered in the mansion. Suddenly the floor crumbles under his feet and he falls to the church's basement. Here, Dante encounters one of sealed demon statues Vergil seeks. The demon tries to convince him to release the seal Sparda placed on it by giving it a name, seriously injuring Dante in the process. He managed to escape its grasp after his demonic powers began to awaken.

Once Dante defeats the demon in question, the Mad Hatter toys with Dante, and tries to convince Dante give the sealed demon a name. Dante, however, sees through the Mad Hatter's attempts to do so, inquiring as to just what will happen if he does; the Mad Hatter refuses to answer. However, before this can go any further, Vergil arrives and almost instantly releases the third of the four seals; Vergil broke the second seal, on Greed, before arriving at the church. Per usual, Vergil allows the demon to choose a name for itself, and it chooses Sloth. After conversing with Dante, exchanging several threats of mortal injury with him in the process, Vergil reveals his plan of raising the Temen-ni-gru, thus opening the gate of the demon world. When Dante declares his intent on stopping Vergil, Vergil then proceeds to taunt Dante by showing him the half of the amulet that Alice stole earlier, prompting him to attack. However, after a quick battle, in which Vergil trounces Dante, Vergil throws his brother's half back to him; Vergil then taunts Dante again, stating that he could retrieve the amulet from him whenever he wanted. This chapter concludes with Arkham preparing to start the ritual to raise the Temen-ni gru.

=== Code 3: Lady ===
There was supposed to be a third volume titled "Code 3: Lady" that was hinted at the end of volume 2, but for unknown reasons it was never released.

== Main characters ==
=== Dante ===
Dante is a fictional character that is the main protagonist of the video game franchise Devil May Cry. He is the son of the Legendary Dark Knight Sparda and a mortal woman called Eva. Half human and half demon, Dante possesses amazing powers and superhuman abilities.

=== Vergil ===
Vergil is the twin brother of the heroic Dante and one of the two sons of the Legendary Dark Knight Sparda. Vergil is, like Dante, a hybrid. His lineage is divided between being half demon and half human, which gives him superhuman abilities. Unlike his brother, he is more serious about his training. His personality is also the opposite of Dante's, having a cold and stoic demeanor as opposed to Dante's wild and thrill-seeking nature.

Throughout Devil May Cry: Dante's Awakening, Vergil is portrayed as stoic, uncaring, power hungry and ruthless.

== Supporting characters ==
=== Enzo ===
Enzo is the 'agent' of Dante, finding him work to keep him on his toes, and is the rightful landlord of the yet unnamed 'Devil May Cry' agency.

In "Code 2: Vergil", Enzo states that "I've looked after that kid since he came to this town" which suggests that Dante did not always live in the city where the Devil May Cry agency is located. Enzo is also quoted as a reference in the Devil May Cry game manual.

=== Arkham ===
Arkham is a mysterious and psychotically enthusiastic man with supernatural abilities who is one of the main antagonists in the manga and in Devil May Cry 3.

Arkham appears to be educated in the subject of demonology as well as the legend of Sparda. He is bald and has a scar or other disfigurement covering the left side of his face, which is seen to pulsate in one cutscene.

=== Mary (Lady) ===
Arkham's daughter. While still a normal human, she is also an exceptionally skilled firearms expert and extremely acrobatic in close quarters combat.

=== Alice ===
Alice is the apparent 'Damsel in Distress' of this manga. Although a child, her vanity and impatience lead her to demonic means to accelerate her growth. Her possessed doll 'Rabi' leads her to a being who resembles the Mad Hatter, and she is used as bait to lure Dante out, with a reward offered for her safe return (the reward is actually put up and paid by Rabi). As a child, she resembles the heroine of Alice's Adventures in Wonderland.
