= Devil May Cry 3: Dante's Awakening =

2005 video game

- North American cover art
- Developer: Capcom Production Studio 1
- Publisher: Capcom
- Director: Hideaki Itsuno
- Producer: Tsuyoshi Tanaka
- Artist: Daigo Ikeno
- Writers: Bingo Morihashi; Takayasu Yanagihara
- Composer: Tetsuya Shibata
- Series: Devil May Cry
- Platforms: PlayStation 2; Windows; PlayStation 3; Xbox 360; PlayStation 4; Xbox One; Nintendo Switch; PlayStation 5
- Release: February 17, 2005: Dante's Awakening; PlayStation 2; JP: February 17, 2005; NA: March 1, 2005; AU: March 22, 2005; EU: March 25, 2005; Special Edition; PlayStation 2; NA: January 24, 2006; JP: February 23, 2006; EU: September 29, 2006 Windows; EU: June 28, 2006; JP: June 30, 2006; NA: October 16, 2006 Nintendo Switch; WW: February 20, 2020; HD Collection; PlayStation 3, Xbox 360; JP: March 22, 2012; NA: March 29, 2012; EU: April 3, 2012; AU: April 5, 2012 PlayStation 4, Windows, Xbox One; WW: March 13, 2018
- Genres: Action-adventure, hack and slash
- Modes: Single-player, multiplayer (Note: Player 2 option is available with using Vergil in Mission 19's second half of the boss fight by pressing Start, but only the Nintendo Switch version provides the full multiplayer experience.)

Devil May Cry 3: Dante's Awakening (Note: Known in Japan as Devil May Cry 3 (Japanese: デビル メイ クライ3, Hepburn: Debiru Mei Kurai Surī)) is a 2005 action-adventure game developed and published by Capcom for the PlayStation 2. The game is a prequel to the original Devil May Cry, featuring a younger Dante. Set a decade before the events of the first Devil May Cry in an enchanted tower called the Temen-ni-gru, the story follows Dante as he attempts to stop his twin brother, Vergil, from opening a portal to the Demon World. The game introduces combat mechanics with an emphasis on combos and fast-paced action. The story is told primarily in cutscenes using the game's engine, with several pre-rendered full motion videos.

Devil May Cry 3 was released in February and March 2005 for the PlayStation 2 and ported to Windows in June and October 2006. It received highly positive reviews from critics, who saw it as a return to form for the series and praised its combat, level design, music, and characters, although some criticized its high level of difficulty in the North American release. It was re‐released in 2006 as Devil May Cry 3: Special Edition (Note: Japanese: デビル メイ クライ3 スペシャルエディション, Hepburn: Debiru Mei Kurai Surī Supesharu Edishon), featuring retooled difficulty levels, the addition of mid-mission checkpoints, "GOLD mode", and Vergil as a playable character. Combined sales of both versions were over 2.3 million. It has been cited as one of the greatest video games ever made. It has been called the game that established the combat formula for 3D sword action games, from hack-and-slash or character action games, to action RPG games, and is credited with saving the series and establishing the Dante archetype for Capcom male leads.

A 2005 manga prequel to Devil May Cry 3's storyline was published in Japan and later the United States.

== Gameplay ==
Dante firing Ebony and Ivory at an opponent

The gameplay in Devil May Cry 3 consists of missions, in which players battle enemies, carry out platforming tasks and solve puzzles to progress through the story. The player's performance in each mission is graded from D through C, B and A, with top marks of S and SS. Grades are based on time taken to complete a mission, the number of red orbs (currency obtained from defeated enemies) gathered, "stylish" combat, item usage and damage received. The games tracks stylish combat by an on-screen gauge, which is the performance of a series of attacks ("combos") while avoiding damage. The longer a player attacks without repetition and evades damage, the higher the score. The gauge registers "Dope" after a few attacks, progressing through "Crazy", "Blast", "Alright", "Sweet", "SShowtime" to peak at "SSStylish". If Dante receives damage, the style rating falls; if the gauge is "Crazy" or below, it will reset. Devil May Cry 3's battle system allows a player to link attacks, with each weapon having a set number of attacks.

Devil Trigger is a mechanic which enables the player's character to assume a demonic form. This alters the character's appearance, increases attack and defense, restores health and enables special attacks. This is a departure from the previous titles, where Dante draws power from weapons and items he procures throughout the game. The Devil Trigger state lasts as long as there is energy in the Devil Trigger gauge; the gauge rises by attacking or taunting enemies in normal mode, and falls when using the Devil Trigger transformation or other abilities using Devil Trigger power. The Devil Trigger mode is not available to Dante until one-third of the way through the game, while Vergil, playable in the special edition, has the ability at the outset.

The other major difference from previous Devil May Cry games is Devil May Cry 3's combat system, which allows a player to choose one of Dante's four combat styles; each style has a different focus and techniques. Dante can switch between all four equipped weapons (two guns, two melees) on the fly, allowing for far greater combat freedom and variety than in previous Devil May Cry games. Style selection is available at checkpoints and at the beginning of each level. The styles are "Trickster", for dodging and agility; "Swordmaster", with abilities for swords and other weapons; "Gunslinger", with firearms techniques; and "Royal Guard", which allows a player to repel attacks with a button press (storing energy for retaliation). Later in the game, two additional styles become unlocked: "Quicksilver", slowing enemies, while the character attacks at normal speed; and "Doppelgänger", which creates a shadow double who fights alongside Dante. A second player may control the shadow double by pressing "Start" on a second controller. A two-player mode, similar to the Doppelgänger style, is accessible while Dante and Vergil battle Arkham. In the special edition Vergil has another style, "Dark Slayer", which is similar to Trickster.

The Devil May Cry 3: Special Edition version of the game makes some changes to the gameplay. Along with making Vergil a playable character, other changes included an additional survival mode called "Bloody Palace" (which originally appeared in the second game) with 9,999 levels; a Jester fight early in the game, with optional fights later; a "Turbo Mode", increasing game speed by 20 percent; an easier GOLD mode "continue" feature, allowing a player to revive a character or restart a lost fight, and rebalanced difficulty levels. Vergil's gameplay differed from Dante's; although Dante was weaker than Vergil in terms of skills and combos, he was easier to control. Because of the game's space limitations, not all of Vergil's moves were included in the special edition.

Vergil has one style, "Dark Slayer" (similar to Dante's "Trickster" style), with evasive maneuvers which can be leveled-up twice like Dante's four styles. He has three weapons: a katana known as Yamato, Beowulf gauntlets and greaves and the Force Edge broadsword. Vergil has two ranges of attack: "Summoned Swords" (creating magical swords for a variety of effects) and "Judgment Cut" (creating spheres of force). The new boss is Jester, a character encountered several times in first-edition cutscenes but not fought. In Devil May Cry 3: Special Edition, he is a boss who may be fought three times.

The Nintendo Switch version of Devil May Cry 3: Special Edition added the ability to switch between styles at any point during combat.

== Plot ==
Devil May Cry 3 starts with Dante's yet-unnamed shop in the early 1990s. A mysterious man, Arkham, arrives with an invitation from Dante's brother Vergil in the form of a demonic attack. After Dante defeats a group of demons, a huge tower erupts from the ground nearby. Sensing that Vergil is on top of the structure, Dante interprets this as a challenge. He begins fighting more demons during his journey, some of which become his weapons once defeated. Dante is attacked by a woman on a motorcycle who turns out to be Mary, Arkham's daughter, who wants revenge on her father for causing her mother's death. It is revealed that Arkham works for Vergil; they plan to take Dante's half of their mother's amulet and use its power on the tower to connect the human and demonic worlds.

After a number of battles and an encounter with a being named Jester, Dante reaches the tower's summit and battles Vergil. Vergil defeats Dante by stabbing him with his sword, Rebellion, steals his amulet and leaves. Dante's blood releases a seal on Rebellion, causing Dante's dormant demonic powers to emerge, and he sets out in pursuit, only to be swallowed by Leviathan, a giant whale-like demon. After escaping from the beast, Dante catches Vergil in a control room in the tower's basement, where Vergil cannot reactivate the tower. The brothers fight again, until they are interrupted by Mary and Jester. Jester reveals himself to be Arkham, who has manipulated them all to reactivate the tower in order to reach the demonic world. There he plans to steal the Force Edge, the dormant form of Sparda's sword with his power, using it to rule a demon-infested Earth. The tower transforms as the spell is broken; Arkham is carried to the summit, and Vergil disappears in the confusion.

Dante battles his way back up the tower, fighting Mary for the right to pursue Arkham. He is victorious, and Mary lends him her most powerful weapon. Reaching the summit, Dante crosses to the demonic world and catches Arkham, who has by now assumed Sparda's demonic form. Overwhelmed by power, Arkham transforms into a blob-like creature and attacks Dante. During their fight, Vergil reappears, and the brothers work together to expel Arkham from the demonic world. Weakened, Arkham lands on the tower where Mary finds him. She renounces her name and calls herself Lady, a nickname given to her by Dante because she refused to tell him her name, before killing him. In the demonic world, Dante and Vergil fight for ownership of the Force Edge and the amulet halves. After Vergil's defeat, he remains as the portal closes, vanishing with his half of the amulet.

Dante meets Lady outside the tower. They become friends and begin a partnership as demon-slayers; Dante ends up naming his shop "Devil May Cry". A scene after the credits shows Vergil in the demonic world, weak but determined, as he charges into battle against his father's old foe Mundus, which serves as a prequel to the first game.

== Development ==
A comparison between the motion capture and the results in the game. Reuben Langdon and Daniel Southworth provided their voice and moves for Dante and Vergil, respectively.

After the mixed reception of Devil May Cry 2, Capcom developed Devil May Cry 3 in a similar manner to the series' more critically acclaimed first game Devil May Cry; its gameplay elements, such as environment size and battle engine, were reexamined. Other aspects of Devil May Cry 2, such as the toning-down of Dante's cockiness and the game's lack of difficulty, were brought back in line with Devil May Cry. According to a pre-release interview with the game's producer, Tsuyoshi Tanaka, the focus of the game's design was a battle system which allowed a player to control weapons in new, "stylish" ways. This coincided with the design of a new type of in-game camera which kept the character in focus, avoiding disorientation in crowded battle scenes. Devil May Cry 2's difficulty was reduced for greater acceptance in the Japanese market, but this move cost the game support elsewhere. To remedy this, the Japanese release of Devil May Cry 3 had a lower degree of difficulty than the North American and European releases and Dante was a younger, more arrogant character than he was in the previous games.

The game was officially announced in the June issue of PSM Magazine #85 and received a trailer at E3 on May 12, 2004, with a playable demo stand available at the expo. The issue also contains an interview with Tsuyoshi Tanaka, in which he mentions that at that point the game has been in development for a little over a year, which indicates that the game had entered production shortly after Devil May Cry 2's release. Devil May Cry 3 was slated to release in December, 2004, but got pushed back to February in Japan and March, 2005 in all other regions.

Capcom promoted Devil May Cry 3's release with a multi-million dollar television campaign and extensive advertising in video game magazines; both emphasized the game's plot and number of fighting styles. The company produced a second, "special" edition, released in North America on January 24, 2006. A Windows version, with minor graphics changes, was developed by SourceNext; it was released by Ubisoft on June 28, 2006, in Europe and October 16, 2006, in North America. The Devil Trigger versions of Dante and Vergil were designed by Kazuma Kaneko from Atlus, who previously collaborated on Zone of the Enders: The 2nd Runner, Shin Megami Tensei III: Nocturne, and the Persona series. The Capcom staff was impressed with Kaneko's work, and Ikeno felt that it was not difficult to model.

In the original Devil May Cry, Vergil was said to have been killed by demons early on after his descent to the demonic world, leaving his soul under the control of Mundus: as such, Bingo Morihashi wanted to create an alternate universe in which Vergil was alive. However, Hideki Kamiya gave Morihashi the freedom to retcon Vergil's backstory and make him a living teenager for the events of Devil May Cry 3. One of the key themes of Devil May Cry 3 is familial conflict, with Dante being in conflict with his brother Vergil. Itsuno said he did not like the idea of Lady killing Arkham, as he believed a child should never kill their parent. Morihashi wanted this scene in the final product, along with Dante defeating Vergil, as themes of the game. To balance this, Morihashi wrote a scene leading up to Arkham's death, where Lady said that Arkham was her responsibility. While the characters were designed by Daigo Ikeno for Devil May Cry 3, the designs for Dante and Vergil's Devil Triggers were created by Kazuma Kaneko from Atlus. As there was currently no existing design for Vergil, except that of his possessed alter ego Nelo Angelo, Morihashi was put in charge of designing his appearance. Most of Capcom's staff believed Vergil was Morihashi's favorite character because he became appealing. Morihashi stated that the idea of Vergil wielding a Japanese sword, called a Yamato, existed in a previous design. Vergil does not wield guns in contrast to Dante; Morihashi said that making Vergil's characterization was challenging because, being the older twin brother, he was intended to be more likable than Dante. Jester was designed to contrast his human persona, Arkham, with Nara and Ikeno believing the clown's form worked well thanks due to how the twist that they are same person surprised gamers. His final form provided by Sparda's powers was designed to resemble previous villain Arius due to how inhuman he became after becoming a demon to the point of lacking a face.

=== Cast and narrative ===
Dante appears bare-chested underneath his coat, something that surprised the audience. This design was meant to fit his young personality as well as contrast Vergil's fully clothed look. Additionally, in contrast to Dante's longsword Rebellion and red clothing, Vergil was made to wield a Japanese katana and wear blue clothing. Ikeno stated that because Vergil and Dante are identical twins, they share a hairstyle in the opening of the game, which was intended to make new players confuse them. Vergil's clothing was meant to contrast with his brother's; similarly, Nelo Angelo's design was prominently blue while Dante's was red. The staff had problems with the creation of Vergil's outfit because of the way it moved in 3D computer graphics; they joked that Vergil should remove his coat whenever he starts fighting.

Reuben Langdon provided the character's voice and motion capture. Although he was directed in Dante's portrayal, Langdon was confused by staff suggestions and played his own version of the character. Langdon auditioned for the character four times before he was chosen. Although he played the first Devil May Cry game, he was not aware of the title's popularity. Before the release of Devil May Cry 3, Langdon said that fans were angry with the new teenage Dante's look. After its release, however, he said that the fans had come to enjoy the character's new incarnation. Langdon enjoyed his work on the game, saying that it was, "one of the most difficult, frustrating and yet rewarding character of anyone I've ever played." He felt that he could enjoy the character even more in Devil May Cry 4. When being cast to voice Vergil, Southworth was aware of the character's history and had a knowledge of samurai culture, which allowed him to give a good performance. According to the game's development staff, Southworth's knowledge about the samurai allowed him to fit well into Vergil's character in terms of voice and motion capture. When describing Vergil, Southworth stated that while he often appears to be calm, the audience would notice he shows signs of rage. Southworth found motion-capturing the action scenes challenging and said these were his favorite parts of his work for the game.

Vergil's character was made playable in Devil May Cry 3: Special Edition due to extra time the team had after the making of the game. Capcom had to remove some of his moves due to space limitations. They tried keeping the moves he uses when being faced as a boss in Dante's campaign. His move set was made to reflect his calm personality that contrasts with Dante's brash confidence. When creating the characters, Vergil was made stronger than Dante, but harder to control because the player would have to learn more moves. Vergil became a popular character among the game's development team; Itsuno stated that he was also well received in the United States because several characters from Hollywood films wield a katana.

== Release ==
Devil May Cry 3: Dante's Awakening was released in Japan on February 17, 2005, for the PlayStation 2. It was followed by releases in North America and elsewhere in the world in 2005. It was a commercial success, and sold 1.3 million copies.

After Devil May Cry 3's release Capcom introduced merchandise based on the game, including a manga (written by Suguro Chayamachi and published by Tokyopop in North America) and a Dante action figure manufactured by Revoltech. A 2006 artbook, Devil May Cry 3 Material Archive - Note of Naught, featured previously unreleased production and CG artwork, storyboards and a UMD video disc for the PSP with trailers and videos (region 2 only). A three-disc Devil May Cry 3 soundtrack was released on March 31, 2005 (shortly after the game's release), produced by Tetsuya Shibata and Kento Hasegawa with lyrics and vocals by Shawn McPherson.

=== Special Edition ===
At the 2005 Tokyo Game Show, Capcom announced a special edition of Devil May Cry 3 with gameplay changes and additional content. The special edition was released on January 24, 2006, as part of the PlayStation 2 greatest hits collection, and it was later confirmed that the PlayStation 2 version of the game would be released in Europe. Devil May Cry 3: Special Edition went on to sell 1 million units.

=== PC ===
On February 1, 2006, Ubisoft announced that they would be releasing a Windows version of the game developed by SourceNext. The European PC version was the first one released on June 28, 2006, before the special edition PlayStation 2 version in that region. The Japanese version was released two days later, and the North American version on October 16.

=== Devil May Cry HD Collection ===
Together with Devil May Cry and Devil May Cry 2, and Devil May Cry 3: Special Edition was re-released in the Devil May Cry HD Collection for the PlayStation 3 and Xbox 360 on April 3, 2012. The HD collection was later released on PC, PlayStation 4, and Xbox One on March 13, 2018, with this iteration of Devil May Cry 3 sporting extra improvements over the original PC release, including XInput controller support.

=== Nintendo Switch port ===
In 2020, Capcom rereleased the game for the Nintendo Switch. This edition is based on the Devil May Cry 3: Special Edition in the Devil May Cry HD Collection, with additional features such as allowing Dante to switch among all weapons and styles, just like in Devil May Cry 4 and Devil May Cry 5. It also adds the option to have local co-op in Bloody Palace mode using Dante and Vergil. Matt Walker was in charge of aiding the developers of this port of the game, seeking new ideas that might fit into it.

== Reception ==
Reception

Aggregate scores
Aggregator	Score
GameRankings	PS2: 84% PS2 (Special Edition): 88%
Metacritic	PS2: 84/100; PS2 (Special Edition): 87/100; PC: 66/100; NS: 82/100

Review scores
Publication	Score
1Up.com	9/10
Eurogamer	8/10
Famitsu	34/40
Game Informer	9/10
GamePro	4.5/5
GameSpot	8.6/10
GameSpy	4/5
GameTrailers	9/10
IGN	9.6/10

The review aggregator website Metacritic gave the original PlayStation 2 release an 84 out of 100, and the Special Edition an 87 out of 100. It was included on Game Informer's list of the top 50 games of 2005, and the special edition received a "Game of the Month" award. In 2010, IGN ranked it 18th on its list of the top 100 PlayStation 2 games, and a GamePro retrospective that year rated it the 28th-best game for the PS2.

Reviews typically praised the game for avoiding its predecessor's mistakes and for customization options, gameplay, combat engine and the musical score despite the contradicting plot lines and character arcs. The style-based combat engine was considered to produce fighting sequences superior to games such as Ninja Gaiden and Prince of Persia: The Two Thrones, and the camera and controls were praised. Devil May Cry 3 was included in the 2010 book, 1001 Video Games You Must Play Before You Die.

The high level of difficulty of the North American version of the initial release was criticized in otherwise-positive reviews. Critics disagreed with Capcom's decision to make the Japanese version's "hard" mode the North American "normal" mode, and the European version of Devil May Cry 3 had the same normal mode as the Japanese version, but maintained the yellow orb continue system of the North American version.

Vergil attacking with his sword, Yamato. His addition as a playable character in the special edition was well received by critics.

The PC version was considered vastly inferior to the PlayStation 2 version due to the poor porting process. Issues included its game engine (thought rough and underpowered), its controls and the inability to save the game and exit, a feature of most PC games. Jeremy Dunham of IGN gave the PC version a score of 5.8 out of 10 (compared to the PS2 version's 9.6), citing its "awful performance" and "craptacular controls". In 2021, PC Gamer listed the PC version as one of the worst PC ports.

The special edition PlayStation 2 release ranked ninth on GameSpy's 2006 "Game of the Year" list; it was commended for recalibrating its difficulty, a survival mode known as "Bloody Palace" returning from the second game and making Vergil a playable character. Play as Vergil was cited for the character's difference from Dante, although the reuse of Dante's bosses and the lack of cutscenes was criticized.
