= Persona 2: Innocent Sin =

1999 video game

- Japanese PlayStation box art
- Developer: Atlus
- Publisher: Atlus: EU: Ghostlight (PSP)
- Director: Shoji Meguro (PSP)
- Producer: Kouji Okada
- Artists: Kazuma Kaneko; Shigenori Soejima
- Writers: Tadashi Satomi; Kazuyuki Yamai (PSP)
- Composers: Toshiko Tasaki; Kenichi Tsuchiya; Masaki Kurokawa; Toshiki Konishi (PSP); Ryota Kozuka (PSP); Atsushi Kitajoh (PSP)
- Series: Persona
- Platforms: PlayStation; PlayStation Portable
- Release: PlayStation: JP: June 24, 1999; PlayStation Portable: JP: April 14, 2011; NA: September 20, 2011; EU: November 4, 2011
- Genre: Role-playing
- Mode: Single-player

Persona 2: Innocent Sin (Note: Known in Japanese as Perusona Tsū: Tsumi (ペルソナ2 罪; lit. Persona 2: Sin)) is a 1999 role-playing video game developed and published by Atlus for the PlayStation. It is the second entry in the Persona series, itself a subseries of the Megami Tensei franchise, and acts as a sequel to the original Persona. The game was re-released in 2011 for the PlayStation Portable. The original version was not localized for western territories; however, the PSP version was released in North America and Europe under the title Shin Megami Tensei: Persona 2 – Innocent Sin.

Innocent Sin takes place in the fictional Sumaru City, focusing on a group of high school students from Seven Sisters High School. The protagonist, Tatsuya Suou, and a group of friends must confront a villainous figure called Joker, who is causing the spread of reality-warping rumors through the city. The group are aided in their quest by their Personas, personified aspects of their personalities. The gameplay features turn-based battle gameplay, where characters use their Personas in battle against demons, and a separate Rumor system, where rumors spread around the city can influence events in the characters' favor.

Development on Innocent Sin began after the release of the original Persona, and retained most of the original's staff. The game carried over the story themes and basic gameplay mechanics of Persona, while changing and improving on some of the mechanics. The characters were designed by Kazuma Kaneko and Shigenori Soejima. The original release was not localized due to staff shortages and concerns over its content. Reception to the game was generally positive for its original release, but reviews were more mixed for its remake due to its age. A sequel, Persona 2: Eternal Punishment, was released in 2000.

== Gameplay ==
Maya Amano summons her initial Persona Maia to attack an enemy.

Persona 2: Innocent Sin is a role-playing game where the player takes control of a group of high school students as they explore the city of Sumaru. The camera follows the party from an adjustable angled overhead perspective. The city in general is navigated using an overworld map. The game's main party holds up to five characters. Whenever the party is in a "safe" area (i.e. a room with no demon encounters), each party member can be conversed with. The party's route through dungeons can be traced using the Auto-Map, a basic floor plan of the current dungeon. As the main character moves around, the map will automatically mark new areas. A key gameplay and story element is the Rumor system: if the party hears a rumor from an NPC, they can spread that rumor using the Kuzunoha detective agency, making the rumor become real and creating effects on the environment. These effects can range from making an accessory or character-specific weapon appear, to triggering the appearance of new shops for the party's use.

Battles include both story-triggered encounters and random encounters inside dungeons: during these encounters, the party is assigned a set of commands and performs them within a turn, then is given the option to change their strategy during the next turn. During battle, characters fight using melee attacks, use items purchased from shops outside battle, and cast a variety of spells using their Personas. Each character has a starting Persona, and each Persona has different elemental strengths and weaknesses. Different Personas can be used for defense, healing or elemental attacks. While a Persona is originally quite weak, if it is used enough, it will achieve a higher rank. In addition to individual actions, the player can align characters to trigger a Fusion Spell: when two or more party members use a certain sequence of spells, they will automatically summon multiple Personas to generate a powerful attack. The party can be manually controlled or act using an Auto-battle option.

During battles, players can converse with most enemies: depending on which character talks with which enemy, they will trigger a different response. If the enemy is talked with in the right way, they will leave either items or tarot cards, items used to summon new Personas: certain cards give access to different Persona family groups. After a Persona is summoned and assigned to a character, that character's stats and abilities change. These Persona summonings and fusions take place in the Velvet Room, a special location separate from the rest of the game's environments. In addition to pre-set tarot cards, the player can also obtain blank tarot cards by forming contracts with enemies through the right conversation. These blank cards can be tailored to fit a chosen Persona family.

== Synopsis ==
=== Setting and characters ===
Innocent Sin takes place in 1999 in Sumaru (珠閒瑠), a seaside city in Japan with a population over 1.28 million. Most of the protagonists come from two high schools in Sumaru: Seven Sisters (七姉妹学園), a prestigious school which the protagonist attends, and the less-prestigious Kasugayama (春日山). During the course of the game, popular rumors of various kinds around the city begin to come true, sometimes with dire consequences. The party wields the power to summon Personas: they are defined in the game's instruction manual as "another side of [the protagonists]". The power of Persona is granted to the party by Philemon (フィレモン, Firemon), a being from the collective unconscious who acts as a spiritual guide and helper. A key element of the story is the Oracle of Maia, a prophecy foretelling of a series of events which will lead to the world's end during a planetary conjunction called the Grand Cross.

The protagonist of Innocent Sin is Tatsuya Suou, a popular senior student at Seven Sisters who prefers to keep himself isolated from the rest of the school. He joins with other students to investigate the happenings around Sumaru: Lisa "Ginko" Silverman, a Caucasian second-year at Seven Sisters who was raised in Japan, and Eikichi "Michel" Mishina, the second-year delinquent leader of Kasugayama High, as well as the adult Maya Amano, a reporter for a teen magazine, and Yukino "Yuki" Mayuzumi, a former student of St. Hermelin High and Maya's photographer. They are later joined by Jun Kurosu, Tatsuya's childhood best friend and a third-year student from Kasugayama High. Other important characters include members of the Masked Circle, a group influencing the rumors around Sumaru; and Nyarlathotep, a representative of the collective unconscious who acts in opposition to Philemon.

=== Plot ===
Innocent Sin begins with Tatsuya and Lisa being lured by Eikichi to where his band is rehearsing in an effort to get Tatsuya to join his band. During the ensuing argument, their Personas reveal themselves and Philemon contacts them, warning them that rumors are becoming reality in Sumaru. The group then act out a game where a figure called the Joker is summoned to grant a wish. When Eikichi and his band do this, the Joker is summoned, then drains all the players but Lisa of their "Ideal Energy" (the essence of hopes and dreams) using a crystal skull. The Joker then attacks Tatsuya, Lisa and Eikichi, accusing them of some unspecified "sin", but leaves when they cannot remember that sin. As the group attempt to learn the Joker's identity, they are joined by Maya and Yukino, the latter of whom is able to explain their Persona abilities. They are eventually brought into conflict with the executives of the Masked Circle, a cult led by the Joker who are gathering Ideal Energy using assigned crystal skulls. They are King Leo (Tatsuya Sudou), a deranged man whose eye was burnt out; Prince Taurus (Ginji Sasaki), a record producer who manipulates Lisa's budding girl group for his own ends; and Lady Scorpio (Anna Yoshizaka), a former student at Seven Sisters who is brainwashed by the group. The group are gradually fulfilling the Oracle of Maia, recorded by Akinari Kashihara (Jun's father) under the influence of Nyarlathotep.

After defeating Sasaki and Sudou, the group are contacted by Philemon, who directs them into caverns beneath the city's Alaya Shrine, where the group are gradually told about their "sin". Ten years prior, Tatsuya, Eikichi, Lisa, and Jun were part of a group named the Masked Circle, where many of them sought solace from their awkward home lives. After Maya announced that she needed to leave, Eikichi and Lisa locked her in the town's Alaya Shrine in an attempt to force her to stay. In a tragic twist of fate, the deranged Tatsuya Sudou set fire to the shrine, and it was only Maya awakening to her Persona that saved her from death. Sudou attempted to kill Maya in his madness, and Tatsuya burnt out his eye with his own Persona. These events were so traumatic that everyone but Sudou willingly forgot them. Jun, manipulated by Nyarlathotep into believing Maya had died in the fire, took on the mantle of the Joker to punish his former friends and make people's wishes come true. Confronting the Joker and the final member of the Circle, Jun's estranged mother Junko, they and the Circle are attacked by group of rumor-generated Nazis called the Last Battalion, led by a resurrected "Fuhrer". Junko, realizing what she and Jun have done, dies protecting Jun from an attack by the Fuhrer using the Spear of Destiny. After battling him, Jun repents, causing his "Ideal Father" to remove his Persona ability and take control of the Masked Circle. Sumaru City is then raised into the sky as part of Xibalba, a spacecraft manifested through rumors surrounding Kashihara's writings, fulfilling part of the Masked Circle's plans.

After being rescued, Yukino grants Jun her Persona powers with Philemon's help. With the Masked Circle and the Last Battalion waging war with each other, the party decide to return the city to normal by removing the five elemental crystal skulls being fought over by the two factions, then confront the Ideal Father. As they collect the crystal skulls, all the party but Jun confront Shadow Selves, manifestations of their suppressed insecurities. On the way to collect the final skull from the heart of Xibalba, they are forced to stop Maya Okamura, a former colleague of Kashihara who has been driven insane by events, from fulfilling the Oracle. Upon reaching the heart of Xibalba, they battle the Fuhrer and the Ideal Father, who turn out to be Nyarlathotep in disguise. After their fight, Philemon appears and explains their status as manifestations of humanity's opposing feelings, and that they have been competing over whether humans can find a higher purpose while holding contradictory feelings. Maya is then fatally wounded by Okamura using the Spear of Destiny, the Oracle is fulfilled, and all the world but Sumaru City is decimated. After Nyarlathotep and Okamura leave, Philemon tells the remaining group that they can reverse Nyarlathotep's work by willing the erasure of the day the five first met as children from existence: in exchange, they must give up their shared memories. The group agree, and a new timeline is created where each character's life has been improved, though their friendship is forgotten. The final scene is of the former group inadvertently crossing paths in front of a train station, with Tatsuya bumping into Maya.

== Development ==
Development of Innocent Sin began after the release and success of Persona. The main staff from the previous game returned, including Kouji Okada (who acted as producer), designer Kazuma Kaneko, and writer Tadashi Satomi. From a technical standpoint, the game not only changed to an overhead view from the first Persona's mixture of overhead and first person navigation, but also made improvements to elements that were criticized in Persona, such as load times and save point frequency. To separate the Persona series from the Megami Tensei series, the first game's banner title Megami Ibunroku was dropped. The theme of Innocent Sin, as with the previous entry, was exploration of the human psyche and the main characters discovering their true selves. The central character theme of Innocent Sin was the growth of teenagers and how they overcome their personal troubles. Another key element was the "power of Kotodama", the Japanese belief that words can influence the physical and spiritual world, with this power manifesting in the world of Persona 2 through the spreading of rumors. Terms and concepts used in the games, including Persona, Shadows and the character Philemon, were drawn from Jungian psychology and archetypes. The character of Nyarlathotep, who had made a cameo appearance as a Persona in the original game, was inspired by the character of the same name from H. P. Lovecraft's Cthulhu Mythos. Other antagonists and enemy creatures in the games were also drawn from the Cthulhu Mythos and played a key role in the narrative.

The main characters were designed by Kaneko, while secondary characters were designed by Shigenori Soejima. While designing the main characters, Kaneko needed to take the character focus into account. The protagonists of Innocent Sin all wore the same school uniform and were given personal items to help distinguish them. The character of the Joker was based on a tradition of flamboyantly-dressed mystery men, along with attacks on people by masked assailants. To emphasize his flamboyant appearance and link him aesthetically to the source of his power, Joker was clad in a strangely colored school uniform. His appearance as a demonic clown was inspired by his actions of absorbing people's dreams. The flower the original Joker holds, an Iris, symbolizes revenge, and connects directly to the Joker's true identity. The various districts of Sumaru City were based on various regions around Japan, including Shibuya, Yamate and Odaiba. In addition to relationships with the female characters in Innocent Sin, Tatsuya could also foster a same-sex relationship with Jun.

=== Port and localization ===
There was a debate at Atlus over whether to localize Innocent Sin. In addition to concerns that American audiences might not understand references to Japanese culture, there were concerns over potentially controversial content including symbolic allusions to Nazis, Adolf Hitler, and the appearance of Nazi Swastikas; in the end, it was decided to not localize Innocent Sin. Later, it was stated by Atlus staff that the main reason for this choice was a shortage of staff and resources, as most of the team needed to localize Innocent Sin were already working on its sequel Eternal Punishment, though the localization team did attempt to change this decision. Despite this, it was reported in 2001 that there was still a chance of Innocent Sin being localized, with its release depending on whether Eternal Punishment was successful in North America. Years after its release, a fan translation of the original version was developed.

A remake of Innocent Sin for the PlayStation Portable was announced by Famitsu in 2010. As with the previous PSP port of Persona, the remake was directed by Shoji Meguro. Due to the unexpected success of Persona's port, the production team was allotted a higher budget to work with, and they decided to use the additional funding to add more features to the game. There were plans to include both Innocent Sin and its sequel in a single game, but they could not fit both games in a single UMD. A new opening movie was produced by animation studio Satelight, who had become famous in Japan through their work on Macross Frontier and Basquash!. While most game openings were intended as a simple introduction, the team wanted this one to be about the re-imagination the game had undergone, so they decided to have an experienced outside studio work on it rather than internal staff. One of the biggest challenges while creating the movie was remaining faithful to Kaneko's character artwork while establishing its own look and style. Meguro and Kaneko were both heavily involved with how the characters were portrayed during the opening.

For the remake, the gameplay was adjusted to resemble its sequel, along with adjusting it to a 16:9 screen ratio from the original 4:3, and interface adjustments for ease of play. The character artwork was redone by Soejima. The voice work was remastered instead of being rerecorded as some of the characters' voice actors had retired. In addition to these changes, a new story quest set in Karukozaka High School, the setting for Shin Megami Tensei If..., was added. The storyline for the new quest was written by Kazuyuki Yamai. The remake was announced for a western release in May 2011. Until this point, Innocent Sin was the only Persona game not to be released overseas. For its European release, the game was published by Ghostlight. The western release did suffer a few content cuts: namely, the ability to create custom quests in the Climax Theater and additional DLC episodes for the Climax Theater that included several former Persona and Shin Megami Tensei settings. They were removed due to what were described as "a number of challenges—technical and otherwise".

=== Music ===
The music for Innocent Sin was composed by Toshiko Tasaki, Kenichi Tsuchiya, and Masaki Kurokawa. Tsuchiya had previously done minor sound work on the original Persona. While he worked on future Persona titles, Shoji Meguro, who had composed music for Persona, was busy composing music for Maken X and so was unable to work on the title or its sequel. Tsuchiya found working on the title difficult, retrospectively calling it his most difficult task until his work on Shin Megami Tensei IV. While he found the CD-based recording medium gave more freedom than the cartridge-based SNES, he had difficulties adjusting the pitches of overlapping instruments and managing memory space. The game's theme song, "Kimi no Tonari" (君のとなり; "Next to You"), was written and sung by Hitomi Furuya. Innocent Sin was one of the first Megami Tensei titles to feature voice acting.

The music for the port was remixed by Toshiki Konishi, Ryota Kozuka and Atsushi Kitajoh. The reason for this was that Meguro, in addition to directing the remake, was handling the music for Catherine, so had to give the task to others. Meguro had also asked Tsuchiya due to his involvement with the original version, but he declined. The amount of music that needed remixing was very large, consisting of over 100 tracks. The majority of remixing was to add subtle effects to tracks that could not be included for the original version. Due to player feedback about the music for the Persona port, the team included the option to switch to the original versions. The new opening's theme song, "Unbreakable Tie", was written by Japanese hip-hop artist and long-time collaborator Lotus Juice and sung by J-pop singer Asami Izawa.

== Reception ==
Reception

Aggregate score
Aggregator	Score	
Aggregator	PS	PSP
Metacritic	-	75/100 (25 reviews)

Review scores
Publication	Score	
Publication	PS	PSP
Famitsu	9/10, 8/10, 8/10, 8/10	7/10, 7/10, 8/10, 7/10
GameSpot	9.2/10	5/10
IGN		8/10
RPGamer		3.5/5
RPGFan	96%	78%

In its year of release, Innocent Sin reached #62 in the Japanese sales charts, selling 274,798 copies. The PSP remake reached #6 in the Japanese sales chart during its first week of release, selling 62,721 units. It dropped to #11 by the following week, selling a further 10,400 units. By October 2011, the game had sold 110,000 units in Japan, placing among Atlus' best-selling titles for that year. During its first week on sale in North America, it reached second place in the PSP sales charts.

Famitsu was positive about the story in both its reviews, saying that it was highly enjoyable for newcomers and those who had played Persona, while the reviewers for the PSP version said that the story "is still innovative even today." RPGFan's Neal Chandran was generally positive in his review of the PlayStation version, particularly noting how the characters confronted their past as well as fighting the main threat, and feeling impressed by the game's ability to move him despite him not understanding much of the dialogue. John McCarroll, writing for the same site, said that the story was one of the few aspects of the game that had not become dated. GameSpot's Peter Bartholow, reviewing the original, gave the game similar praise, saying "[Innocent Sin]'s story is darker, stranger, and more involving than most of the fluffy fantasy fare crowding today's marketplace." This opinion was generally shared by Carolyn Petit in her review of the PSP version, with her saying that despite a very slow start, the story and characters became interesting for her. IGN's Vince Ingenito, while noting the game's differences from later Persona titles, called it "a wonderfully original story", and praised the localization. RPGamer's Zach Welhouse said that the game "uses its grand, cosmic backdrop to magnify the adolescent concerns of its protagonists until they pop with energy."

As a character, Tatsuya Suou has been positively received by critics and fans across his two major appearances in the Persona 2 duology. Writing for RPGFan, Neal Chandran remarked that "he fits the mute lead role quite well, as he is a private person". He further praises his characterization as being distinct from other examples of silent protagonists in the JRPG genre, exclaiming, "...unlike many angsty teens, Tatsuya is surprisingly likeable, pretty sociable, and many of his actions show strength of character". In his review of Innocent Sin's remake for PlayStation Portable, IGN's Vince Ingenito commented that Tatsuya's characterization, among the other playable characters, "creates a serious commentary on the average person's willingness to believe anything they see or hear while making teenage ennui manifest in tangibly dangerous ways", while also likening the game's overall narrative and portrayal of its characters, to an episode of the television series Buffy the Vampire Slayer (1997-2003). RPGamer.com compared Tatsuya's character and relationship with the ones from Lunar due to their dysfunctional relationships and tragic stories with Tatsuya learning through his tragedy.

The gameplay was praised by Bartholow, calling the Persona system "Surprisingly simple and well balanced", and admired the game's polish despite its limited use of the PlayStation hardware. Ingenito found the gameplay entertaining, saying that it would appeal to fans of the Pokémon series due to its Persona-collecting mechanic. Famitsu, reviewing the original, said that the general gameplay was "quite orthodox", but found the battle system stood out from other RPGs and praised the Rumor system's story and gameplay role. Chandran found many parts of the gameplay enjoyable despite noting the lack of its sequel's more autonomous Fusion Spells, saying that "had loads of fun playing [Innocent Sin]." Welhouse was generally less enthusiastic in his review of the PSP remake, citing the battles as slow and dungeons as boring.

The original audio was lauded by Bartholow, stating the voice acting "[added] dimension to the already-excellent characterizations", and called the music "almost always appropriate and exciting" with its blending of rock and techno music genres. Ingenito was less positive about the voice acting for the remake, but generally praised the music. Chandran generally praised the music, although noting that some of the game's looped themes were repetitive. He also called the voice acting "generally pretty good", despite finding Tatsuya and Maya's inconsistent.

One of the Famitsu reviewers for the PSP remake was a little critical, saying that long load times when entering battles and the lack of guidance were among minor things that "niggled me". Despite this, features such as the ability to switch soundtracks and the Theatre Mode were praised. Petit was highly critical of the remake, citing the gameplay as "Tedious [and] repetitive", referred to the Rumor system as "dull", and generally felt that the game had not aged well. Ingenito also noted long loading times, along with a very high encounter rate and low-quality graphics carried over from the original. McCarroll commented that many of the remake's faults stemmed from the expectations for an RPG when the original was released. Welhouse shared multiple criticisms with other reviewers, despite generally enjoying the experience.

== Legacy ==
During the development of Innocent Sin, the writer Tadashi Satomi felt that the story needed an alternate viewpoint to that of the main hero. This formed the basis for Persona 2: Eternal Punishment. Localized for the west, Eternal Punishment was released in 2000 in Japan and North America. The game, along with Eternal Punishment, received a spin-off manga titled Persona: Tsumi to Batsu, featuring new characters from Seven Sisters. Its 2011 reprint featured new content connecting the manga to Innocent Sin. In 2007, Atlus and Bbmf created and published a mobile version of Innocent Sin. Titled Persona 2: Innocent Sin – Lost Memories, it carried over the crucial systems of Innocent Sin, including the Persona and Rumor systems, while tailoring them for a mobile format.
