= Somer Assault =

1991 video game

- Developer: Atlus
- Publisher: Atlus
- Producer: Hideyuki Yokoyama
- Designers: Mayodon Mania; Kazuma Kaneko
- Programmer: Tsuyoshi Kunieda (Tuohi)
- Artists: Yoshimi Haishita; Kōji Takino
- Composers: Hidehito Aoki; Katsuyuki Inose
- Platform: TurboGrafx-16
- Release: 1991
- Genre: Action game
- Mode: Single-player

Somer Assault, known as Mesopotamia (Note: Japanese: メソポタミア) in Japan, is a side-scrolling action game developed and published by Atlus in 1991 for the TurboGrafx-16. It features an unnamed pink Slinky object/creature as the protagonist, which can fire bullets from its sides, jump, and slink along walls in its quest to stop an evil sorceress. The title is a play on the word somersault, as the Slinky somersaults around the stage while assaulting enemies.

== Gameplay ==
The Slinky is able to move along the floor, walls, and the ceiling by slinking along them; it can also make a short jump to move between walls and platforms to slink to a different section of each stage. The Slinky is also equipped with a machine gun that fires from both sides of it to take out the myriad of enemies swarming in each stage. The player is given several hit points which can be increased with power-ups, several lives should the player die, and unlimited continues. A time limit is given for each level, and the goal is to reach the boss of the stage and defeat it before time expires.

Players are asked to enter their date of birth at the start of the game. This causes one boss to fire power-ups as gifts rather than damaging shots (for example, entering a birthday of April 27 will cause the Taurus boss to fire power-ups at the Slinky rather than damaging shots).

== Plot ==
The story (existing in the export version only) is presented in a short prologue sequence at the game's start. "In a time and world not of our own", the evil Sorceress uses her dark powers to summon twelve powerful minions, each of them representing one Zodiac sign, and sends them to conquer the world. The Slinky has to battle through 12 stages of enemies, destroying each Zodiac boss along the way, in order to reach the Sorceress herself and put an end to her plot.

On the final stage, the player must defeat all of the bosses in succession before facing the Sorceress. After she is downed, her body explodes and a battle commences against three enemies resembling the Slinky and called "The Mimickers". When they are destroyed, "The Creator" appears as the real end boss.

== Reception ==
Reception

Review scores
| Publication | Score |
|---|---|
| AllGame | 3.5/5 |
| Electronic Gaming Monthly | 7/10, 8/10, 8/10, 7/10 |
| Famitsu | 6/10, 6/10, 7/10, 5/10 |
| Gekkan PC Engine | 75/100, 70/100, 75/100, 65/100, 75/100 |
| Joypad | 78% |
| Joystick | 75% |
| Marukatsu PC Engine | 6/10, 7/10, 7/10, 7/10 |
| VideoGames & Computer Entertainment | 7/10 |
| Hippon Super! | 6/10 |
| Play Time | 76% |

Somer Assault garnered mixed reviews from critics.

The game's player character was ranked #9 in the GameSpy's "Top Ten Lame Lead Characters" list by Kevin "Fragmaster" Bowen.
