= Erika to Satoru no Yume Bōken =

1988 video game

- Cover art
- Developer: Atlus
- Publisher: Namco
- Composer: Hirohiko Takayama
- Platform: Family Computer
- Release: JP: September 27, 1988
- Genre: Adventure
- Modes: Single-player (controlling both Erika and Satoru); 2-player (simultaneous)

Erika to Satoru no Yume Bōken (Note: Japanese: えりかとさとるの夢冒険; lit. "Erika and Satoru's Dream Adventure") is a 1988 adventure video game developed by Atlus and published by Namco for the Family Computer. The game is set in 20th century Japan.

Two-player adventure games were considered very rare at the time of the game's release, even in Japan. However, only one person could partake in the animal quiz portion. Failing the quiz would force the player(s) to start from the beginning.

It is one of the few games for the Family Computer to use the Namco 163 wavetable sound chip, and is also one of the games that enables all eight sound channels provided by the chip, the other being King of Kings.

== Gameplay ==
Erika is examining a large building; hoping to find something useful for her quest.

Erika and her brother Satoru live together in a normal Japanese house. One night, a cat-like being gives them a mission to search for a powerful crown that will alter time and space for the person who possesses it. Players must control both Erika and Satoru simultaneously, causing them to interact with their surroundings at the same time. A player using the second controller can also control one of the characters. In-game activities that require two players include shoplifting and eliminating locusts.

The players interacting with characters and complete their quests, with the eventual aim of retrieving the Time Crown, the item needed to win the game. The players can solve quests by manipulating items, and teamwork is required, as one character cannot solve certain tasks without the other being present. When a player visits a landmark on the map, the view switches from a bird's eye view to a first-person perspective. A map of the buildings and surroundings is always visible, except during storyline sequences and when players are interacting with their surroundings.

There are five chapters in the game. Once the player completes the third chapter, the difficulty level becomes drastically harder. Satoru has the weakness of being able to drown, unlike his sister Erika, who can swim in the water levels of the game. Players may use Erika to prevent Satoru from drowning.

The end of the game contains an easter egg in the form of a developer's lengthy profane complaint about his coworkers' behaviour, which can be triggered at the game's ending after a series of button presses.
