= Cosmo Tank =

1990 video game

- North American cover art
- Developer(s): Atlus
- Publisher(s): Atlus
- Programmer(s): Masami Satō; Hidehiko Harada
- Composer(s): Tsukasa Masuko
- Platform(s): Game Boy
- Release: JP: June 8, 1990; NA: September 1990
- Genre(s): Shoot 'em up
- Mode(s): Single-player; Multiplayer

Cosmo Tank (Note: Japanese: コスモタンク, Hepburn: Kosumo Tanku) is a video game published by Asuka Technologies and developed by Atlus. It was released in 1990 for the Game Boy; with most of the gameplay programmed as a 2D shooter with some levels resembling that of a 3D shooter video game.

All the 2D levels were designed by Masami Satō while all the 3D levels were designed by Hidehiko Harada.

== Gameplay ==
The player controls an armoured fighting vehicle from either a first-person perspective or a third-person perspective; depending on the level design. All games begin on a planet's surface with an overhead view. When the player enters a tunnel, the view switches to first-person. After destroying the Life Core inside a tunnel, the player travels to a new planet through a vertically scrolling stage.

Cosmo Tank has three modes. In quest mode, the object of the game is to destroy Alien Life Cores on five planets to free them from Master Insect. Players can earn experience levels in the quest mode by defeating enemies. The maximum number of experience points that a player can earn is 999; which allows players to reach the level cap of 6. In training mode, the player practices in a closed area and is given a ranking. In vs. mode, the Game Link Cable is used to allow two players to race to defeat the alien leader.

After either beating the game or acquiring a game over, the player is given a rank that shows how far they made it in the game along with their target score. The lowest rank in the game is a skull and crossbones (signifying a casualty on the battlefield).

== Reception ==
Power Play gave Cosmo Tank an overall rating of 62% (equivalent to a C− letter grade).
