= Rockin' Kats =

1991 video game

- Cover art
- Developer: Atlus
- Publisher: Atlus
- Designer: Hideyuki Kubota
- Programmers: Masami Satō; Hidetoshi Takagi
- Artist: Sawako Satō
- Composer: Tsukasa Masuko
- Platforms: Nintendo Entertainment System, PlayChoice-10
- Release: JP: April 5, 1991; NA: September 1991; EU: November 19, 1992
- Genre: Platform
- Mode: Single-player

Rockin' Kats (Note: Known in Japan as N.Y. Nyankies (Japanese: ニューヨークニャンキーズ, Hepburn: Nyū Yōku Nyankīzu)) (originally released in Japan as New York Nyankies) is a platform video game developed and published by Atlus. in 1991 for the Nintendo Entertainment System. The side-scrolling game involves the adventures of an anthropomorphic cat in his quest to defeat a criminal gang of dogs that has taken over New York City.

== Plot ==
The player takes control of Willy, a rising young jazz cat in New York City who goes by the stage name of "The Rockin' Kat." However, the local crime boss, Mugsy, kidnaps Willy's girlfriend, Jill. To rescue Jill and defeat the gangster, Willy must venture through seven different levels or "channels" (from a television set) that feature various themes, thugs, and bosses.

== Gameplay ==
Channel 1

Willy is armed with a punch gun that he can launch at the various thugs, or hook onto and swing from. Willy can also use the punch gun to grab and throw certain objects. Mastering the punch gun is critical to the player's success in the game.

There are a total of five stages. The first four stages can be played in any order and are selected at the start of the game as "channels" on a TV monitor. The fifth and final stage, or "channel," becomes available only after the other four have been beaten. The levels include a carnival, a flight atop a moving plane, and a park. There's also a "shopping channel", where the player can buy power-ups with cash obtained through the game. The items include:

- Bomb - Bombs fly from Willy's glove when used
  - Twin Balls - Every punch releases two projectile balls
  - Hammer Punch - A spiked metal ball replaces the glove
  - Jet Sneakers - Can be used with a jump to land slowly
  - Extra Life - Provides an extra life for Willy

There is also a "bonus channel" where minigames can be played for additional cash and extra lives. The games are:

- Roulette - Willy uses his glove on a roulette wheel and performs a spin attack. Stopping on a specific number wins a prize.
- Pipe Toss - Willy uses his glove to catch falling balls and tosses them into moving pipes to earn cash.
- Basketball - Willy uses his glove to perform a super spin jump to toss himself into moving basketball hoops.

A password feature is available that helps the player keep track of their progress.

After the final credits roll, the player is given a chance to play an additional "secret" stage. In it, the player character is stripped of all the money and power-ups acquired, is only given three lives (without a chance to get more), and the stage's levels are vastly more challenging than any of those seen previously in the game and require complete mastery of the punching gun's functions. In addition, the character's health is not replenished after completing a level, as it is in the other stages.

== Release ==
Rockin' Kats was released in Japan for the Family Computer on April 5, 1991.

== Reception ==
Reception

Review scores
Publication	Score
AllGame	3.5/5
Famitsu	5/10, 7/10, 6/10, 4/10
HobbyConsolas	69/100
Video Games (DE)	39%
Power Unlimited	7/10
VideoGame	8/10

Rockin' Kats garnered average reviews from critics.
