= Revelations: Persona =

1996 video game

- North American PlayStation cover art, featuring the Persona Vishnu
- Developer: Atlus
- Publishers: JP: Atlus (PS, PSP); JP: ASCII Corporation (PC); NA: Atlus USA; PAL: Ghostlight (PSP)
- Directors: Kouji Okada; Shoji Meguro (PSP)
- Designers: Takayuki Ide; Hideaki Uratani (PSP)
- Programmers: Hidetoshi Takagi; Tomoaki Kasuya (PSP)
- Artists: Kazuma Kaneko; Masahisa Watanabe; Shigenori Soejima; Sachie Tousuji (PSP)
- Writer: Tadashi Satomi
- Composers: Hidehito Aoki; Misaki Okibe; Kenichi Tsuchiya; Shoji Meguro
- Series: Persona
- Platforms: PlayStation, Microsoft Windows, PlayStation Portable
- Release: PlayStation: JP: September 20, 1996; NA: December 14, 1996; Windows: JP: March 25, 1999; PlayStation Portable: JP: April 29, 2009; NA: September 22, 2009; EU: August 11, 2010
- Genre: Role-playing
- Mode: Single-player

Revelations: Persona (Note: Japanese: 女神異聞録ペルソナ, Hepburn: Megami Ibunroku Persona; lit. "Alternate Tales of the Goddess: Persona") (also known as Megami Ibunroku Persona in Japan, sometimes with the subtitle, "Be Your True Mind") is a 1996 role-playing video game developed and published by Atlus. It is the first entry in the Persona series, itself a subseries of the Megami Tensei franchise, and the first role-playing entry in the series to be released in the West. Originally released for the PlayStation in 1996 in Japan and North America, the title was ported to Microsoft Windows in 1999. A port to the PlayStation Portable, retitled Shin Megami Tensei: Persona, (Note: Persona (ペルソナ, Perusona) in Japan) was released in North America and Japan in 2009, and the following year in Europe. This port featured new cutscenes and a reworked English localization that was more faithful to the original Japanese release, as the original 1996 North American localization was heavily criticized for its unfaithfulness to the original Japanese version.

The story focuses on a group of high school students as they are confronted by a series of supernatural incidents. After playing a fortune-telling game, the group gains the ability to summon Personas. Using this power under the guidance of Philemon, a benevolent being representing humanity's subconscious, the group faces off against multiple forces that threaten the world. Gameplay revolves around the characters navigating environments around their town and fighting enemies using their Personas. During the game, the player can create new Personas for battle using spell cards gained in battle or by talking with enemies.

Persona began development after the release of Shin Megami Tensei If..., with the idea of creating a subseries around the positively received high school setting of If.... Multiple staff members from previous Megami Tensei titles were involved in development, including character designer Kazuma Kaneko, and director Kouji Okada. Multiple aspects of the story, including Personas and the character Philemon, were taken from Jungian psychology, while Kaneko's character designs were based on both staff members, and celebrities and fictional characters of the time. Reception to the game has generally been positive, with most praising its approach to the genre, while its navigation and localization were criticized. Its PSP port shared most points of praise with the original, along with the improved localization, but also drew negative comments for its by-then dated mechanics and graphics.

== Gameplay ==
Screenshot of combat in Shin Megami Tensei: Persona, showing one of the main characters summoning a Persona in battle

Revelations: Persona is a role-playing video game in which the player takes control of a group of high school students. A mixture of navigation styles are used: navigation around the students' hometown is done using an overhead view, navigation of standard environments such as outside areas and story locations use an angled third-person view, and dungeons along with most other buildings are navigated in first-person. The player saves their progress by visiting certain, predetermined locations. An icon in the top right-hand corner of the screen displays a lunar phase: this display shows the passage of in-game time, and its status determines the activity patterns and moods of enemy demons. Battles are both triggered by story events and through random encounters around the world map and dungeon environments. If the player attacks an enemy from behind, the party is given a set of attacks costing no magic points or health points.

Battles take place on a grid-based battle arena, with characters and enemies moving according to their position on the grid. Four commands are available to the party: Attack (fight enemies), Contact (talk with an enemy), Analyze (check an enemy for its strength and weaknesses), and Form (rearrange the party on the grid). The character's main means of attack is their Persona, beings summoned into battle to cast a spell that can heal the party, and inflict physical or elemental damage on an enemy. Each Persona has access to up to eight skills, and each character can change their Persona during their turn. Personas earn experience points independent of the characters they are assigned to, and gain new abilities through extended use. Experience is awarded based on how often the player uses certain characters or Personas. Alongside their Personas, each character is able to attack with an equipped melee weapon or firearm, use an item, or attempt to talk with the demons that act as the game's standard enemies.

Talking to a demon has different effects based on its personality, responding in a specific way to certain actions. There are four emotional responses that the player can elicit from a demon: anger, fear, joy, and interest. Triggering one of these emotions three times will cause the demon to perform an action: an angry demon will attack the party, a frightened demon will flee the battle, a joyful demon will give the player an item, and an interested demon will either leave the battle, give the player an item, or give the player a special spell card (tarot cards aligned with a particular Persona family or Arcanum). Functions related to the customization of Personas are performed in a special place called the Velvet Room: there, the character Igor can summon new Personas from among the various enemies defeated for a fee. He can also use two spell cards along with a special item to create a new Persona, which can inherit skills from the Personas used in the fusion. A Persona can only be fused using cards from certain Persona families. Personas can also be deleted if the player so chooses.

== Synopsis ==
=== Setting and characters ===
The game takes place in Japan in 1996, in the town of Mikage-cho. (Note: Lunarvale in the Revelations localization.) All the main characters attend St. Hermelin High, the town's high school, being in Class 4 taught by Saeko Takami. (Note: Ms. Smith in the Revelations localization.) The other main feature of the town is the local branch of SEBEC (Saeki Electronics & Biological & Energy Corporation). All the main characters have the power to summon Personas, described in the manual as "the power of their hidden selves". The power to call Personas is granted by Philemon, a being born from the Collective Unconscious who acts as the party's spiritual guide and helper. He appears both in a human form and as a butterfly.

The player controls a silent protagonist, a second-year student who acts as their in-game representation. The rest of the cast are Maki Sonomura, (Note: Mary in the Revelations localization.) whose near-constant ill health has made her inwardly bitter; Kei Nanjō, (Note: Nate Trinity in the Revelations localization; retconned to Nate Nanjō in Eternal Punishment.) a self-confident heir to an important family business; Yukino Mayuzumi, (Note: Yuki in the Revelations localization.) a former gang member reformed through the efforts of Saeko; Hidehiko Uesugi, (Note: Brad in the Revelations localization.) a man who puts on a facade of strength to cover his weaknesses; Yuka Ayase, (Note: Alana in the Revelations localization.) a girl who consciously acts like a stereotypical "high school girl"; Masao Inaba, (Note: Mark in the Revelations localization. The PSP remake makes it his nickname.) a spoiled and rebellious youth; and Eriko Kirishima, (Note: Ellen in the Revelations localization. In the PSP remake, her nickname is Elly.) a woman with half-American parentage with an interest in the occult. The main antagonist is Takahisa Kandori, (Note: Guido Sardenia in the Revelations localization; Eternal Punishment retcons this name into an alias.) who runs the local SEBEC facility. During the SEBEC route, the player has the option of recruiting Reiji Kido, (Note: Chris in the Revelations localization.) a student with a vendetta against Kandori.

=== Plot ===
The game starts with the protagonist, along with schoolmates Hidehiko "Brown" Uesugi, Yuka Ayase and Masao "Mark" Inaba, playing a fortune-telling parlor game called "Persona" while Kei Nanjō and Yukino Mayuzumi watch. After playing the game, the group see a ghostly figure, and the protagonist, Mark, Nanjō, and Yukino are rendered unconscious. The protagonist is then drawn into the realm of Philemon, who grants him the power of Persona and warns him that his new power will soon be needed. After the four recover and at the suggestion of their teacher Saeko, they go to have a check-up and visit classmate Maki Sonomura at the hospital. While visiting, Maki is taken ill, and while they are waiting for news, the ICU where Maki is being treated vanishes and the town is attacked by demons, the summoned manifestations of people's inner darkness. Using their Personas, the four defend themselves, and after meeting up with Eriko "Elly" Kirishima, they head to the town's Ayama Shrine to find Maki's mother Setsuko. Upon arrival, they find Setsuko wounded after an attack by Takahisa Kandori. Setsuko reveals him to be the culprit behind the changes to the town, caused by a reality-altering machine called the Deva System. Nanjō and Mark head out to confront SEBEC, while the protagonist, Elly and Yukino bring Setsuko back to the school. After this point, the game splits into two story routes: the main SEBEC route, and the alternate Snow Queen route.

In the SEBEC route, should the protagonist decide to confront SEBEC, he is first joined by a recovered Maki, then asked by Nanjō to help save Mark, who is captured by demons. The protagonist, Maki and Nanjō rescue Mark, but on the way Maki displays an odd lack of certain memories including being hospitalized. After rescuing Mark and infiltrating SEBEC, the group confront Kandori. After cornering him inside the Deva System, a girl in black called Aki appears and knocks the party unconscious. When they awake, they find themselves in a duplicate, idealized version of their world. The group eventually find and corner Kandori, whose ultimate goal was to become a deity and find meaning in life. After an initial fight, Kandori is possessed by his Persona Nyarlathotep, then finally defeated. Before dying, Kandori reveals that the Maki who has been traveling with the party is the "Ideal Maki", a version of herself from the true Maki's heart. Aki and a girl in white called Mai are also pieces of Maki, and the idealized Mikage-cho was created by Maki, and brought into reality when she unexpectedly linked with the Deva System. The group must help Maki avoid Kandori's path towards isolation and his current actions. The group manage to convince Ideal Maki to overlook her original self's unconscious actions and join them in fixing the problem. After rescuing the true Maki's self from the Sea of Souls, where all human life begins, the group must then confront Pandora, an aspect of Maki that wants to use the Deva System to destroy everything. When Pandora is defeated, all the pieces of Maki merge back into one, reversing the effects on the town and restoring her to full health. Philemon meets with the group and congratulates them on their success.

The Snow Queen route, which takes place in the real town of Mikage-cho, is unlocked by investigating an urban legend within the school surrounding a theatrical mask used in performances of "The Snow Queen": nearly everyone who wears the mask to play the title role has died, with the exception of Saeko, whose friend disappeared instead. After finding the mask, the protagonist encounters Saeko, who puts on the mask and is possessed by a spirit within it. Freezing the entire town, the possessed Saeko generates three towers, with the spirits of those previously killed by the mask as their guardians, whilst setting up her Ice Castle within the high school. Along with Yukino, Ayase, Elly, Brown, and Nanjō, the protagonist heads out to save Saeko. Philemon contacts them and tells them that the only way to save Saeko is the Demon Mirror, which can remove the source of the mask's curse. The spirit possessing Saeko turns out to be former classmate Tomomi Fujimori, who was horribly disfigured by the mask when she wore it in place of Saeko. Using the mirror, the group are able to free Saeko and bring Tomomi peace. It is then revealed that Tomomi herself was controlled by the Night Queen Asura, a powerful entity who wants to cloak the world in darkness. Upon defeating the Night Queen, the town is freed from her power.

== Development ==
The development of Revelations: Persona began in 1994, after the release of Shin Megami Tensei If.... The high school setting of If... was received positively upon release, so series developer Atlus decided to create a dedicated subseries focusing on the inner struggles of young adults. This concept eventually evolved into Persona, and its underlying focus on the "human soul" would become a mainstay of the Persona series. The title Megami Ibunroku was designed to show the title's status as a spin-off directly related to the Megami Tensei series, although it was removed for later Persona titles. The Persona system was directly inspired by the Guardian system used in If..., originally designed by future Persona director Katsura Hashino. Veteran Megami Tensei producer Kouji Okada, and character designer Kazuma Kaneko took over these respective staff roles. New to the production team was writer Tadashi Satomi. The script took about a year to write, with the staff going through twenty drafts. The first draft involved the students going on a field trip and being caught in a series of mysterious events. This was one of the more fondly-remembered versions. Shigenori Soejima, a future designer for the series, was involved in designing minor characters and coloring promotional and cover artwork. The main concept behind Persona was a Megami Tensei game that could be enjoyed by people new to the series. The popularity of casual games on the PlayStation was a key factor in making this decision. The development team's focus on Persona resulted in development on Shin Megami Tensei III: Nocturne coming to a near-halt.

Kaneko designed the main cast around multiple notable celebrities and fictional characters of the time, along with members of Atlus staff. While the characters wearing the same uniform helped designate them as a single group, it also made them look the same. To balance against this, Kaneko expressed their individuality through accessories. Atlus staff members also made cameos as minor characters. The character of Philemon was based on Carl Jung's titular wise old man archetype, described as a contradictory existence. His appearance in-game was based on paintings of Chinese philosopher Zhuang Zhou. Multiple ideas and terms used in-game were based on Jungian psychology and archetypes. The Velvet Room, a key gameplay location, was based on the Black Lodge from Twin Peaks. One of the characters focused on by Kaneko was Maki, who was given multiple forms throughout the story. The first versions created were the original Maki, who had been bed-ridden for a long time, and the "ideal" version, whose inexperience with the outside world and interactions with others made her an expressionless doll. In addition to these forms, black-clothed "Aki" and white-clothed "Mai" were created when Maki's personality split, representing her extremes. The true Maki represented balance, so Kaneko made her uniform grey. Because of this, the school uniform had to be grey. To represent her psychological immaturity, she was given a ribbon to represent her girlishness, along with a locket she believes can grant wishes.

=== Ports and localization ===
Persona was released in Japan on September 20, 1996, for the PlayStation. The game was ported to Windows and released on March 25, 1999, by ASCII Corporation. The game was compatible with Windows 95 and 98 operating systems. The game released in North America in December 1996. The PlayStation version was also released for the PlayStation Classic on December 3, 2018, worldwide, marking the original version's European debut.

The PlayStation Portable version was directed by Shoji Meguro, the original game's composer. It was Meguro's first project as a director. It was decided to remake the original Persona as a large number of new fans had been brought to the series by Persona 3 and Persona 4, so Atlus decided to give them easier access to the beginning of the series. The game was announced in February 2009, and released on April 29 of that year. Along with gameplay adjustments and balancing, such as adding adjustable difficulty levels and modifying enemy encounter rates, full-motion cutscenes produced by anime studio Kamikaze Douga were created. The cutscenes were voiced, while the rest of the game used text-based dialogue as in the original. In Europe and Australia, the title was released by Atlus as a digital title on PlayStation Network.

Masao "Mark" Inaba as seen in the Japanese versions of Persona (left), and the Revelations localization (right). This change was not retained for the localization of the PlayStation Portable version.

Persona was the first role-playing entry in the Megami Tensei series to be released in the west, with the first Megami Tensei release being action game Jack Bros. in 1995. While the main Megami Tensei series' use of Christian imagery made it unsuitable for localization at the time, Persona employed a different naming system to make it more acceptable. Persona was localized by Atlus' then-new North American branch Atlus USA. Persona was chosen as a series that could help define the company and compete with the likes of Final Fantasy, Suikoden and Breath of Fire. The team that localized Persona was quite small, which made the process quite difficult: not only was there a large amount of text to translate, but the team needed to adjust or change the Japanese references as they feared it might alienate western players. Among the changes were altering the player character's hairstyle, the ethnic origins of multiple characters, the character and location names, and multiple pieces of dialogue. The entire Snow Queen route was also cut from the game, leaving only the SEBEC story route open for exploration.

The PSP remake's localization was similar to those done for Persona 3 and 4, with the dialogue being in tune with modern youth and keeping as close to the original dialogue as possible except for Japan-specific cultural references. To provide a reference for their work, the localization team played through the original version of Persona. The changes made to character names and appearances in the Revelations localization were not retained, with the exception of a couple of lines that had become fan favorites. These were included as a kind of homage to both players and the company's history of game localization. The entire Snow Queen quest was also included.

=== Music ===
The music for Persona was written by Hidehito Aoki, Kenichi Tsuchiya, Misaki Okibe and Shoji Meguro. Persona was Tsuchiya and Meguro's first major work, with Meguro beginning shortly before he officially joined Atlus' internal staff. Meguro worked on the title for approximately a year, composing ten to twenty percent of the score. The first piece composed by Meguro was "The Aria of the Soul", the theme for the Velvet Room, originally commissioned by Aoki. "The Aria of the Soul" would become a mainstay in future Persona titles. For the PSP re-release, Meguro composed new music alongside remixing original tracks. While he kept the original atmosphere, he also used the experience and musical techniques gained from his work on Persona 3 and 4. He also tried some new techniques, such as with the opening theme, which began with a pop motif before transitioning into heavy metal, along with changing the important lyrics from English to Japanese, with vocals provided by Persona 3 main vocalist, Yumi Kumikoda.

The official soundtrack album, Persona Be Your True Mind Original Soundtrack, was released on June 17, 1999. An arrange album, Megami Ibunroku Persona Original Soundtrack & Arrange Album, was released April 18, 1999. In Japan, the official soundtrack for the PSP port was released on April 29, 2009. In the United States, the Persona soundtrack was packaged with the game's retail release.

== Reception ==
Reception

Aggregate scores
| Aggregator | Score |
|---|---|
| GameRankings | PS: 80% (8 reviews); PSP: 78% (31 reviews) |
| Metacritic | PS: 78/100 (6 reviews); PSP: 78/100 (30 reviews) |

Review scores
| Publication | Score |
|---|---|
| 1Up.com | A (PSP) |
| Electronic Gaming Monthly | 8/10, 7.5/10, 8/10, 8/10 (PS) |
| Famitsu | 9/10, 8/10, 8/10, 7/10 (PS) |
| Game Informer | 25.5/30 (PS); 8/10 (PSP) |
| GamePro | 4.5/5 (PS) |
| GameSpot | 7.3/10 (PS); 5/10 (PSP) |
| IGN | 7.5/10 |
| Next Generation | 3/5 (PS) |
| GMR | 9/10 (PS) |
| Play (US) | 8.5/10 (PSP) |
| RPGamer | 8/10 (PS); 3.5/5 (PSP) |
| RPGFan | 91% |

During its debut week, Persona sold 201,147 copies. These would remain the best first-week sales in the franchise until the release of Persona 5 in 2016. In its year of release in Japan, Persona sold 391,556 units, reaching number 21 in the 100 best-selling games of that year. Persona was described at the time of its original western release as a "sleeper hit". The PSP port of the game was also highly successful: while Atlus estimated sales of 50,000 and 35,000 units in Japan and North America, respectively, actual sales reached 160,000 and 49,000 units.

Famitsu was generally positive about the setting and plot, and enjoyed the careful incorporation of Megami Tensei gameplay mechanics alongside new features. GameSpot's Jeff Gerstmann called it "a truly different RPG", praising the story, setting and gameplay, while criticizing the quality of the localization and feeling indifferent about the graphics and level layout. IGN called the game "an RPG masterpiece", praising its departure from fantasy-based RPGs of the time. The Electronic Gaming Monthly review team considered the contemporary setting and multitude of options in battle to be refreshingly original, though they found the complexity of the battles overwhelming at points. Next Generation also complimented the originality of the setting, but concluded the game "lacks the kind of cohesion needed to be called great." The reviewer elaborated that the frequent shifting of gameplay perspectives is frustrating, and that "Missing is a fluid unraveling of the story, and in its place is a fragmented disclosure of the facts, interrupted entirely too often by battle scenes." Game Informer variously complemented the game for its challenging gameplay, and story and setting, with one reviewer calling it "the best PlayStation RPG available." GamePro's Art Angel said the same, and added that it "may even challenge the upcoming Final Fantasy VII as the season's best RPG." He cited the informative and efficient interface, lack of pixelation, spell effects, voice clips in battle, fun persona system, and the replay value stemming from the multiple endings. Jeff Walker, writing a retrospective review of the game for RPGamer, generally shared points of praise and criticism with Gerstmann, summing the game up as "a sure winner". RPGFan writer EsquE was positive overall about the game, calling it "an achievement in dedicated game design", and saying in closing that "[Revelations: Persona] deserves much more respect than it has received."

Reviewing the PSP port, Eric L. Patterson of Play was highly positive about the game's old-school mechanics and the chance to replay it with an improved localization and the Snow Queen route reinstated. He did say that for fans of the PlayStation 2 Persona games, "[Persona] could very well feel like a punch to the face and a boot to the crotch." Jeremy Parish, writing for 1UP.com, said that the way Persona broke away from RPG norms through the communication with demons during battle made it essential playing for fans of the genre. He was generally positive about most aspects apart from its visuals. Game Informer's Joe Juba, despite noting awkward navigation and the inability to appreciate character and enemies designs due to their small sprite size, generally praised the game for improving on the original game's flaws. Ben Reeves, giving a second opinion on the game as part of the review, generally shared Juba's points of praise, though found the minimap inadequate. GameSpot's Lark Anderson was more critical than most, praising the story and improved localization, but finding the combat, navigation and graphics fairly dated compared to both recent and contemporary RPGs. IGN's Sam Bishop shared critiques about the graphics with other reviewers, but enjoyed most other parts of the game, and particularly appreciated the inclusion of the Snow Queen route. RPGamer's Glenn Wilson and RPGFan's Neal Chandran generally echoed other reviewers' sentiments: Wilson cited it as a less enjoyable game than the PlayStation 2 Persona entries while still being a quality project, and Chandran called it "a killer trip down memory lane with a pair of high-definition rose-colored glasses." Shin Megami Tensei: Persona was also awarded RPGFan's Editor's Choice Award.

== Legacy ==
Revelations: Persona was successful enough to establish the Persona series in North America and become a cult classic. The game's success prompted the development of a sequel. Persona 2: Innocent Sin, which was released in 1999 and involved many of the same staff. Persona was adapted into a manga titled Megami Ibunroku Persona. Originally serialized in 1996, it was later reissued in 2009. In 2006, Atlus and mobile company Bbmf released a mobile spin-off game, Megami Ibunroku Persona: Ikū no Tō-hen. It is a 3D dungeon crawler set during the events of Persona. The unexpected success of the PSP port of Persona led to the development of PSP ports for both Innocent Sin and its sequel, Persona 2: Eternal Punishment, both ports also being directed by Meguro.

=== Remake ===
In November 2026, internal Sega footage from a Revelations: Persona remake, provisionally titled Persona: Be Your True Mind, was leaked online. This leak was similar in manner to Persona 3 Reload's. This footage, which was captured in Unreal Engine, featured dungeon exploration, battles and Persona summons, and a scene that led to Social Link progression. The user interface was also updated to match Persona 5's. It was noted that Tatsuya Suou, from Persona 2: Innocent Sin, appeared during the battle sequence as a stand-in for another character, and Eriko's animations recycled Yukiko Amagi's Persona summoning animation from the forthcoming Persona 4 Revival.
