= Red Garden media and materials =

This is a list of media and materials related to the anime series Red Garden.

== Anime ==
The anime Red Garden is done by GONZO and directed by Ko Matsuo. It began broadcasting in Japan on October 3, 2006, on TV Asahi.

The English version the anime is licensed by Funimation. It was licensed before by ADV Films. Red Garden is a DVD-only series and also ran on the specialty service The Anime Network.

=== Voice actors ===
==== The Four Girls and their Friend ====
- Kate Ashley - Akira Tomisaka (Japanese), Melissa Davis (English)
- Rachel Benning - Ryoko Shintani (Japanese), Maggie Flecknoe (English)
- Claire Forrest - Miyuki Sawashiro (Japanese), Kara Greenberg (English)
- Rose Sheedy - Ayumi Tsuji (Japanese), Brittney Karbowski (English)
- Lise Harriette Meyer - Misato Fukuen (Japanese), Taylor Hannah (English)

==== Animus ====
- Lula Ferhlan - Rie Tanaka (Japanese), Shelley Calene-Black (English)
- J.C. - Takashi Kondo (Japanese), Chris Patton (English)
- Lucy - Sawa Ishige (Japanese), Shannon Emerick (English)

==== Doral ====
- Hervé Girardot - Takehito Koyasu (Japanese), Jose Diaz (Ep. 1-16), Quentin Haag (Ep. 17-22) (English)
- Raul Girardot - Sukekiyo Kameyama (Japanese), Rob Mungle (English)
- Anna Girardot - Nozomi Masu (Japanese), Serena Varghese (English)
- Emilio Girardot - Wataru Hatano (Japanese), Leraldo Anzaldua (English)
- Mirielle Girardot - Rikako Yamaguchi (Japanese), Stephanie Wittels (English)
- Dr. Bender - Ryou Sugisaki (Japanese), Todd Waite (English)

==== Grace ====
- The Director - Sho Saito (Japanese), Marcy Bannor (English)
- Paula Sinclair - Megumi Kobayashi (Japanese), Lesley Tesh (English)
- Jessica - Saori Goto (Japanese), Jessica Boone (English)
- Kerry - Nanae Inoue (Japanese), Bree Welch (English)

==== Friends of the Girls ====
- Amanda - Haruka Kimura (Japanese), Elizabeth Bunch (English)
- Luke - Yuuki Masuda (Japanese), Illich Guardiola (English)
- Nick - Daisuke Ono (Japanese), Jacob A. Gragard (English)
- Sam - Shuma Shiratori (Japanese), Amit Patel (English)
- Susan - Omi Minami (Japanese), Cynthia Martinez (English)
- Vanessa - Sakura Matsumoto (Japanese), Monica Rial (English)
- Juan - Toshinobu Iida (Japanese), Andrew Love (English)
- Sarah - Mizuki Fujita (Japanese), Kim-Ly Nguyen (English)

==== Family ====
- Kate's Father - Yoji Ueda (Japanese), Chris Hutchison (English)
- Kate's Mother - Haruhi Terada (Japanese), Christine Auten (English)
- Emma Ashley - Ryoko Nagata (Japanese), Emily Carter-Essex (English)
- Rachel's Mother - Rei Igarashi (Japanese), Allison Sumrall (Ep. 4), Tamara Levine (Ep. 5+) (English)
- Claire's Father - Takaya Kuroda (Japanese), Justin Doran (English)
- Randy Forrest - Hisao Egawa (Japanese), Vic Mignogna (English)
- Rose's Mother - Masami Toyoshima (Japanese), Donna Hannah (English)
- Robert Sheedy - Shōto Kashii (Japanese), Ernie Manouse (English)
- Carrie Sheedy - Sumire Morohashi (Japanese), Hilary Haag (English)
- Paul Sheedy - Yuutaro Motoshiro (Japanese), Shannon Emerick (English)
- Robert Mayer - Tarou Masuoka (Japanese), Charles C. Campbell (English)

==== The Police ====
- Claude - Shinpachi Tsuji (Japanese), John Swasey (English)
- Neil - Yoji Ueda (Japanese), Eddie Shannon, Jr. (English)

=== Red Garden Region 1 DVD Releases ===
Title	Number	Release date
Red Garden Volume 1: Live to Kill	1	September 18, 2007
1. Farewell, Girls; 2. Cruel Night; 3. True Me; 4. Where Are We Going?
Red Garden Volume 2: Breaking the Girls	2	November 20, 2007
5. Every Window; 6. Small Light; 7. Another Fate; 8. Go Love
Red Garden Volume 3: The Body Snatchers	3	January 22, 2008
9. Awakening; 10. Bewildered; 11. Respective Thoughts; 12. His Expectations
Red Garden Volume 4: Blood and Thorns	4	March 25, 2008
13. Holiday; 14. The Reason for Fighting; 15. Sorrow, And Hatred, And...; 16. A Sad Lie
Red Garden Volume 5: Love Lies Bleeding	5	June 24, 2008
17. The Truth; 18. A Little Hope; 19. Feelings That Won't Reach; 20. The Room Left Behind
Red Garden Volume 6: To Die Forever	6	February 17, 2009 (Limited Release)
21. The Final Morning; 22. Light; OVA. Red Garden: Dead Girls
Red Garden Season 1 Box Set Part 1	1	December 12, 2008
Episodes 1-12
Red Garden Season 1 Box Set Part 2	2	December 12, 2008
Episodes 13-22 OVA. Red Garden: Dead Girls		
Red Garden Complete Series & OVA		September 8, 2009
Episode 1-22, Dead Girls OVA

== Music ==
=== Anime opening sequences ===
Title	Artist	Episodes
Jolly Jolly	JiLL Decoy association	01-22
=== Anime ending sequences ===
Title	Artist	Episodes
Rock the LM.C	LM.C	01-11
OH MY JULIET.	LM.C	12-21

=== Red Garden Original Soundtrack ===
Red Garden Original Soundtrack

Soundtrack album by Akira Senju
- Released: January 17, 2007
- Genre: Anime Soundtrack
- Length: 67:19

1. Main Theme ~ Sou de aru to negau kara
2. Kojin no shi
3. Nasu koto toshite
4. Ayumi .. Yamerarezu ni
5. Yowaku, yowaku
6. Shizuka ni omou koto
7. Sono saki ni mieta kara, zutto zutto
8. Omoi omoi, soko ni...
9. Soshite mata, to
10. Eirei
11. Miete kuru mono e
12. Seinen no kao to akai-iro
13. Tsunagari no houkai
14. Fukanzen naru mono
15. Hai iro no shiawase
16. Konnichiwa owari da kara
17. Mienai hikari
18. Anata to ita kara mieta koto
19. Utsukushiku to mo mitomezu
20. Owari kara no ippo
21. Susumu, soshite susumu
22. Kireru Ishi
23. Te no kasanari
24. Akai Niwa
25. Ai ~ Wazuka na omoide / KOKIA
26. Katsu ~ Mabara na hikari / KOKIA
27. Kurenai ~ Negai / KOKIA
28. Sumire ~ You to tomo ni / KOKIA
29. Shiro ~ Watashi-tachi no hibiki / KOKIA

== Manga ==
The manga version is published by Gentosha Comics and is drawn by Kirihito Ayamura. It began serialization in the seinen manga magazine Comic Birz on August 30, 2006. The first tankōbon was released on February 24, 2007, the second one on September 22, 2007, and the third one on March 24, 2008.
