= Laura Napoli =

American actress

- Education: Barnard College
- Alma mater: Columbia University
- Occupations: Actress; voice actress; writer; producer
- Years active: 1998 - present
- Website: LauraNapoli.com

Laura Napoli is an American actress known for her voice and motion-capture work as Jessica McCarney in the Capcom Xbox 360 hit Dead Rising. She also appeared in Capcom's game Devil May Cry 4 as the motion-capture actress for Kyrie and Lady.

== Early life ==
Napoli graduated from Barnard College in 2001 and later she attended Columbia University and earned her BA cum laude in English.

== Filmography ==
=== Television ===
Year	Title	Role	Notes
2007	Celebrity Deathmatch	Danica Patrick	Episode: The Banter Bloodbath
2008	The Tonight Show with Jay Leno	Sarah Palin	2 episodes
2011	Svetlana Season 2	Robin Riker	Episode: Mom! Dad!
2012	Zombie Family	Betty	Episode: Death of a Salesman
2013	WRNG in Studio City	Indiegogo Top Contributor	Episode: Mi Stan Es Not Tu Stan
2015	20 Seconds to Live	Tina	Episode: Clear
2016	The Real O'Neals Season 1	Bebe Wood	Episode: The Real Lent
2016	NCIS: Los Angeles	Anne	Episode: Belly of the Beast
2016	The Real O'Neals Season 2	Bebe Wood	Episode: The Real Thang

=== Film ===
List of voice performances in direct-to-video and television films
Year	Title	Role	Notes
1998	The Repair Shop	Murdered Prostitute	
1998	Two Way Crossing	Katie	
2007	Last Stand of the 300	Spartan	TV film
2008	The Making of Devil May Cry 4	Kyrie / Lady	
2010	Hinnon Valley	Tracker	Short
2012	'Legitimate Rape' Pharmaceutical Ad	Spokeswoman	Short
2012	Looking Forward	Alex Prescott	
2013	Texatude	Laura	Short
2013	The Adventures of Don Juan and Don Tu	Evah's Guard #2	Short
2016	Baby and Me Yoga	Mother	Short
2017	Graham: A Dog's Story	Amanda	Short
2018	Looking Forward: 2016	Alex Parkhurst	
2018	Street Ships	Kanani Rose Rogers	Short
2019	#FullMethod	Caroline Prescott	
2020	You're Fine	Maggie	Short

=== Video games ===
List of voice performances in video games
Year	Title	Role	Notes
2006	Dead Rising	Jessica McCarney	Xbox 360
2008	Devil May Cry 4	Lady / Kyrie	PlayStation 3
2009	Dead Rising: Chop Till You Drop	Jessica McCarney	Wii
2011	Final Fantasy XIII-2	Additional voices	Xbox 360
2012	Steel Battalion: Heavy Armor	Soldier / Computer	Xbox 360
2016	Dead Rising 4	Jessica McCarney	PlayStation 4
2024	Dead Rising Deluxe Remaster	Jessica McCarney (motion capture)	PlayStation 5
