= Last Stand of the 300 =

- Written by: David Padrusch; Matt Koed
- Directed by: David Padrusch
- Country of origin: United States
- Original language: English

Production
- Running time: 91 minutes

Original release
- Network: History Channel
- Release: 2007

Last Stand of the 300 is a TV docudrama which premiered on the History Channel in 2007. It was directed by David Padrusch.

== Synopsis ==
In 480 B.C, during the Greco-Persian Wars the Persian Empire led by Xerxes I of Persia fought the Greek city-states forces at the pass of Thermopylae in central Greece. This battle was to become known as the Battle of Thermopylae. The only thing stopping the Persians was an army led by King Leonidas I and his 300 Spartans, considered by many to be the greatest soldiers the world has ever known. Vastly outnumbered, the Greek Spartans held up the Persians advance for three days, until they were overrun by Persian forces. The film also focuses on the lead up to the Battle of Thermopylae revealing that the Greeks might have played a part in the Ionian Revolts in Asia Minor in 499 to 493 B.C. It brings its viewers into understanding ancient warfare when the documentary focuses on the naval battle around Thermopylae, strategic and tactical considerations, and the aftermath of the battle which led to the burning of Athens and Greek victories in battles such as Plataea. It also reveals to those unaware that the Spartans did not fight alone.

== Cast ==
- Jeffery A. Baker as Spartan General
- Orion Barnes as Themistocles
- Erin Bennett as Leonidas's mother
- Kristopher Blount as Helot
- Laura Napoli as Spartan
- Douglas K. Stuart as The Persian Spy
- John Winscher as Alexander the Great

== Creative ==
Mechanism Digital, one of New York's largest 3D animation studios, produces a large amount of in-show programming for The History Channel, Discovery Channel, and National Geographic, as well as show opens and graphics packages.

In order to present the original topography of Thermopylae as accurately as possible and to recreate the combat experience, Mechanism shot people on green screen and placed them into various CG environments such as the Pass of Thermopylae, Athens, water, and more. Mechanism Digital employed 12 seats of After Effects in an assembly line fashion. They first broke up the edit into individual clips, some of which were only a couple of seconds long. Then they keyed the background green screen. Next, they replaced the background from a library of approved color palettes for each location. "Each palate had been applied with a Magic Bullet preset and then adjusted to further refine the look. We wanted to help people know visually where the scene was taking place and whether they were looking North to South or South to North. Once the palates were completed they were motion tracked (if necessary) and then sent to the render farm. After which, the converted frame sequences were sent compiled into movies," said Lucien Harriot.
