= Red Garden =

Japanese anime television series

- Genre: Psychological horror; Supernatural horror; Supernatural thriller
- Manga
- Written by: Kirihito Ayamura
- Published by: Gentosha Comics
- Magazine: Comic Birz
- Original run: August 30, 2006 – January 30, 2009
- Volumes: 4
- Anime television series
- Directed by: Kou Matsuo
- Written by: Tomohiro Yamashita; Mari Okada
- Music by: Akira Senju
- Studio: Gonzo
- Licensed by: Crunchyroll (Note: In North America through Crunchyroll, LLC (formerly known as Funimation).); UK: MVM Films
- Original network: TV Asahi
- English network: US: Crunchyroll Channel
- Original run: October 3, 2006 – March 13, 2007
- Episodes: 22
- Original video animation

Red Garden: Dead Girls
- Directed by: Kou Matsuo
- Written by: Mari Okada
- Music by: Akira Senju
- Studio: Gonzo
- Licensed by: Crunchyroll; UK: MVM Films
- Released: August 8, 2007
- Runtime: 45 minutes
- icon

Red Garden (stylized in all caps) is a Japanese anime television series produced by Gonzo which premiered in Japan on TV Asahi on October 3, 2006. The plot revolves around four girls who become involved in a series of supernatural murders happening throughout the vicinity of a fictional depiction of New York City. An OVA sequel called Dead Girls was released in Japan, on August 8, 2007.

A manga of the same title began serialization in the seinen manga magazine Comic Birz on August 30, 2006. The first tankōbon was released on February 24, 2007.

Red Garden employs a technique often used by animated productions outside Japan, but rarely used in Japanese animation. The characters' dialogue is animated after the work of the voice cast, synchronizing the animation with the voice actors' voices. The synchronization is particularly evident in scenes where characters are singing (occurring in some of the earlier episodes).

Red Garden was licensed for release in English by ADV Films for $660,000 and the first DVD was released on September 18, 2007. ADV Films' Anime Network began airing the anime on September 13, 2007, on their Subscription On Demand platform. On March 6, 2008, the anime began airing on their Free On Demand platform. Funimation (later Crunchyroll, LLC) acquired the series Red Garden in 2008.

== Plot ==
=== TV series ===
Kate, Rachel, Rose, and Claire are all students at a private school set on Roosevelt Island, New York City. Waking up one morning, all feel uneasy and restless as they deem strange that none of them can recall anything about the previous night. Their anxiety escalates when the school announces that Lise, another classmate of theirs and friend to all four girls, is found dead.

The girls after a battle. From left to right: Claire, Kate, Rose and Rachel.

The following night the four girls are drawn by butterflies that lead them all to the same place. There, they are approached by a woman called Lula and her partner JC who tell them that they are dead, and must work for them. They are revealed to be working for an organization called Animus. On certain nights the girls are summoned to fight "monsters" that look almost like regular people, and can do this by using superhuman abilities. After a fight the girls are drained and tired. If they fail, they will die for real, like other girls who work for Animus. Later Lulu explains the girls were reanimated in new, special bodies and their real bodies are in her custody. What's more, when Lise had originally disappeared, the girls had gone looking for her, and right after they found her dead body was when they were killed. Lise was also supposed to have been reanimated, but the "monsters" had prevented this. Lula further claims she has the means to eventually return the girls to their previous lives when their job is done.

The four girls are involved in a centuries-old battle between the Animus and the Dolore clans. Long ago one of a pair of a Book of Curses was stolen by the Dolore, and because of that they were put under a curse where they become beasts and die, while the Animus lost their freedom and were cursed with eternal life. The Animus want to retrieve the stolen book that is now held by the Dolore and the Dolore want the other book now held by the Animus.

Meanwhile, Hervé of the Dolore clan is trying to save the lives of his cousin and sister, as they are subject to the curse. To do this he plans to take the companion book from the Animus clan. The four girls find out if they fail to retrieve the book from the Dolore family it will result in them losing their memories. This means that they would live forever but not remember their friends or family.

A considerable portion of the series is devoted to the effects that these events have on the girls' complex personal lives: While they overcome their obstacles by eventually agreeing to support each other, the series explores both their initial individual struggles in coming to terms with their roles as fighters for the Animus, and balancing these roles and their relationships with family and friends.

=== OVA ===
Set 300 years in the future, Kate, Rose, Rachel and Claire have no memory of their first 17 years, but know that the Red Garden on Roosevelt Island holds the key. They divide their immortal lives between normal school life and vigilantism. Then two mysterious transfer students Louise and Edgar Mayer seek out their friendship.

The girls go to explore the Red Garden but are attacked by a giant robot. Rachel constructs a very stylish and fashionable robot herself, and the girls return to the Red Garden. They are again attacked by a more powerful mechanical device controlled by Edgar Mayer but manage to defeat it. Louise appears and is revealed to be a powerful android, who envies the 'Dead Girls' because they live forever. Before she can attack the girls, the island's vegetation comes alive and envelops her and Edgar. After graduation, the girls decide to move on, planning to return in a couple of hundred years.

== Characters ==
=== Main characters ===
Kate Ashley (ケイト・アシュレイ, Keito Ashurei)
Voiced by: Akira Tomisaka (Japanese); Melissa Davis (English)
From an affluent family, Kate struggles to maintain her position as a member of "Grace", an elite group of girls tasked with enforcing rules and policing the student body. Of the four girls she had been the closest to Lise, and is the one who suffered most because of her friend's death. She starts to date Hervé, who is a friend of her sister's boyfriend, oblivious to his true intentions until he tells her in episode 15 that he is actually a part of the Dolore Clan and their enemy. Kate is extremely serious, and viewed as 'boring' by most people, something she admits. She cares deeply about her friends, and despises Hervé because of what he had done to her, Lise, and Emma. She is the first to develop her abilities in the group, and in the OVA, she is much quieter, but still her usual self; due to her memories being erased, she has no recollection of Lise or Hervé, and thus, she does not make the comparison in their reincarnations appearances. She creates the theme song for the 'Dead Girls' group.
Rachel Benning (レイチェル・ベニング, Reicheru Beningu)
Voiced by: Ryoko Shintani (Japanese); Maggie Flecknoe (English)
The "popular girl" stereotype and the most mentally unstable of the girls, Rachel had a boyfriend and an active social life before her untimely death. She finds it difficult to reconcile her old existence with her current situation, sometimes straining her relationship with her boyfriend. She finds comfort in talking to her Literature teacher whom she regularly meets as the cafe to talk about books as well as drink coffee. She obsesses about her nails, and fashion, and when her friend Amanda stole her boyfriend, she acted as if she didn't care, which deeply angered Amanda. Eventually, she loses all ties to her friends. She is potentially the most aggressive in combat. In the OVA, she seems to have given up on beauty and her fashionista ways, and acts much like an 'old woman'. However, due to all of her reading, she appears very smart, even designing a giant robot for battle. It was stated that she once went through a wild phase as Reiko of Nanba, Osaka, in which she dressed in visual kei style clothing, to the point that Rose commented how it was like "a costume party every day".
Claire Forrest (クレア・フォレスト, Kurea Foresuto)
Voiced by: Miyuki Sawashiro (Japanese); Kara Greenberg (English)
The most independent and aggressive of the girls. She lives alone in a run-down apartment and holds part-time jobs to make ends meet. She does this despite the fact that her family is wealthy because of her strained relationship with her father, because he threw her mother out on the streets, although why is never explained. She also cares deeply about her brother Randy, and when his business fails, she is deeply angered at her father for not being there to help him (even though it was later explained that he was in Europe trying to find out who had betrayed Randy). Her race is very unclear, because both she and her brother have darker skin tones, while her father does not; it can be drawn that she is potentially bi-racial, as she has had that color since her youth. She is quick to react in battle, even bringing a baseball bat to the fights. In the OVA, she becomes much like Rachel, being extremely fashionable and manipulative with men.
Rose Sheedy (ローズ・シーディー, Rōzu Shiidii)
Voiced by: Ayumi Tsuji (Japanese); Brittney Karbowski (English)
A shy girl who won a place in the school by academic scholarship. She takes care of two younger siblings while her mother is hospitalized. Unfortunately for her friends, Rose used to lack the courage to fight and ended up only being a bother; however, after Rachel is almost killed because of her cowardice, Rose realizes that to save herself and her friends she must fight no matter how painful it may be for her. At the end of episode 18 she realises that she must live her life as best she can and not worry about what will become of her. Her father had walked out on her shortly before her mother got sick, and her friend Sarah helps her find him, and he becomes a part of the family again, which made Rose happy because she would soon disappear from their lives; that someone would be able to take care of her siblings and mother in her absence. In the OVA, she acts much like Kate does, becoming a perfectionist student, and the leader of Grace, with Jessica and Paula's reincarnations, and had even stated that "she wanted to be cool this time", suggesting that they move from place to place living new lives each time.
Lise Harriette Meyer (リーズ・ハリエット・メイヤー, Riizu Harietto Meiyaa)
Voiced by: Misato Fukuen (Japanese); Taylor Hannah (English)
She was about to be reanimated like the other girls when she was kidnapped by Hervé. Lise spent the first episodes dead and unconscious, until she was finally brought back to life but without any of her memories. Her real corpse was discovered in the woods and it is her death which draws the attention of the police. Lise is being used by Hervé's family to try to find a cure for their family's curse. As the cursed blood was injected into her, she becomes a Man-Beast whenever she makes contact with blood. She also went insane after Herve tried to kill her and her memories returned, going to the school during the final battle. She turned into ash when the tomes were returned to the Animus, possibly due to the injected blood. However, she returns in the OVA as a reincarnation of herself named Louise Mayer (ルイーズ・メイヤー, Ruīzu Meiyā), an android who admires the 'Dead Girls' because they live forever.
Hervé Girardot (エルベ・ジラルド, Erube Jirarudo)
Voiced by: Takehito Koyasu (Japanese); Jose Diaz (1-16), Quentin Haag (17-22, OVA) (English)
The mysterious man who lived in the mansion where the five girls were murdered. Hervé witnessed his mother being killed after she fell victim to the family's curse and transformed in a monster. His sister and cousin, the last two female members of his family, started to show the symptoms, much to his despair. Hervé feels that the family's efforts to find a cure through Lise will result in the abandonment of attempts to cure his sister and cousin. He manipulates Kate, and is the main antagonist in the series. However, he meets his downfall at the hands of not the Animus, but his own sister Anna instead; he had lost mobility due to the wounds inflicted by Lula (she ripped out his sides), and then when Anna began to change, she attacked him as well. He was forced to crush her spine, killing her, and died of sustained wounds and major blood loss (the girls followed a trail of blood to his location); even if Anna hadn't attacked him, the amount of bleeding from both sides would've killed him. Along with Lise, Hervé returns in the OVA as a reincarnation of himself named Edgar Mayer (エドガー・メイヤー, Edogā Meiyā), who is deeply in love with Lise's reincarnation and intends to destroy the Dead Girls for her sake.

=== Supporting characters ===
Lula Ferhlan (ルーラ・フェルラン, Rūra Feruran)
Voiced by: Rie Tanaka (Japanese); Shelley Calene-Black (English)
Along with her brother JC, she is the contact between the girls and Animus, the organization at war with Hervé's family and those who reanimated them. She knows much more than she let on, and claims the less the girls figure out about the situation they are in, the better. She is much like the girl's, and is simply an innocent victim as well, who just wanted to be with her brother forever. As such, she was extremely sad when Herve killed JC. In the final battle, she is killed by Hervé, but not before inflicting wounds that eventually led to his death. She is extremely powerful in combat, although she is occasionally overwhelmed by Herve, who was about to kill her, until JC stepped in and was killed in her place. As she lay dying during the final episode, the girls cradled her, pleading with her not to die, because they hated her for bringing them into this, saying that if she died, they would have to forgive her, showing that they did indeed respect Lula. Lula's reincarnation has no ties with the animus in the OVA, but happens to be the neighbor of the Dead Girls, in a much happier version of herself.
Paula Sinclair (ポーラ・シンクレア, Pōra Shinkurea)
Voiced by: Megumi Kobayashi (Japanese); Lesley Tesh (English)
The chairman of the group 'Grace'. She appears to be close to Kate, and cares for Kate deeply, and constantly excuses her from Grace work and responsibilities. It is revealed that she does in fact love Kate, and her family are members of Animus, although Paula herself is not. Her grandmother, the headmistress of the school, is one of the leaders of Animus. As such, Paula knew everything that Kate was put through, which is why she stood up for Kate and excused her, attempting to make life less difficult. Paula is potentially Kate's most treasured friend, as before the final battle, she spent the day and night with Paula. In the OVA, Paula's reincarnation is still a member of Grace, although, this time, Rose Sheedy is the chairman.
Jeremy Charles "JC" Ferhlan (ジェレミー・チャールズ・"ジェー・シー"・フェルラン, Jeremī Chāruzu "Jē Shī" Feruran)
Voiced by: Takashi Kondo (Japanese); Chris Patton (English)
Lula's brother and a man of few words, as he can almost be seem as if he has no personality. While he supports Lula's actions, he is also to be very empathic toward the four girls and although the Animus is an all-women group, JC possesses similar abilities as well. However like Paula, JC is not truly one of the Animus, as he is killed in the battle by Hervé, and his body remained intact rather than being turned into ash, thus revealed to be either human or a Dolore. He was later buried soon afterwards, and his full name was revealed during his sister's visit prior to the final battle. Despite the appearance of Lula's reincarnation, JC does not appear at all in the OVA.
Emilio Girardot (エミリオ・ジラルド, Emirio Jirarudo)
Voiced by: Wataru Hatano (Japanese); Leraldo Anzaldua (English)
A cousin of Hervé, he tends to be more level-headed and more rational than Hervé and at times he seems to be more sympathetic to the four girls than his brother. He is first introduced to the story as the boyfriend of Kate's sister, Emma. Like JC, Emilio does not appear in the OVA, despite the appearance of Hervé's reincarnation.

=== Theme songs ===
Opening:

- "Jolly Jolly" by JiLL-Decoy association (JIRUDEKO)

Ending:

- "Rock the LM.C" by LM.C
- "Oh My Juliet" by LM.C

== Production staff ==
- Supervision: Kou Matsuo
- Original idea / Series constitution: Tomohiro Yamashita
- Script: Tomohiro Yamashita
- Character original idea: Jun Fuji
- Animation character design: Kumi Ishii
- Animation director: Masatoshi Kai
- Sound director: Toshiki Kameyama
- Music: Akira Senju
- Color design: Hiroichi Furuichi
- Visual coordinator: Kentarou Sasaki

== See also ==
- List of Red Garden episodes
- Red Garden media and materials
