= Broken Blade =

Japanese manga series

- Cover of the First English volume

ブレイク ブレイド (Bureiku Bureido)
- Genre: Action, Mecha
- Manga
- Written by: Yunosuke Yoshinaga
- Published by: Flex Comix
- English publisher: NA: CMX (former) Titan Comics (current)
- Magazine: Shōnen Blood (2006); FlexComix Blood (2007–2012); Comic Meteor (2012–2022)
- Original run: September 12, 2006 – October 12, 2022
- Volumes: 20
- Anime film series
- Directed by: Tetsurō Amino (chief); Nobuyoshi Habara
- Produced by: Ken Ookawara; Nao Hirasawa
- Written by: Masashi Sogo
- Music by: Yoshihisa Hirano
- Studio: Production I.G; Xebec
- Licensed by: AUS: Madman Entertainment; NA: Sentai Filmworks; UK: MVM Films
- Released: May 29, 2010 – March 26, 2011
- Runtime: 50 minutes (each)
- Films: 6
- Anime television series
- Directed by: Nobuyoshi Habara
- Music by: Yoshihisa Hirano
- Studio: Production I.G; Xebec
- Original network: Tokyo MX; Sun Television; BS11
- Original run: April 6, 2014 – June 22, 2014
- Episodes: 12

Broken Blade (Japanese: ブレイク ブレイド, Hepburn: Bureiku Bureido; 'Break Blade') is a Japanese manga series written and illustrated by Yunosuke Yoshinaga. It was serialized in various Flex Comix magazines from September 2006 to October 2022, with its individual chapters collected into 20 volumes. It was adapted into six 50-minute anime films.

== Plot ==
The story is centered around a young man named Rygart Arrow, a resident of a world where people can use "magic". This magic is the ability to control and empower quartz, doing many things from creating light to operating machinery to riding giant mecha called "Golems". Rygart, however, is one of the few exceptions; as an "un-sorcerer", he cannot utilize quartz, making many aspects of life difficult as well as being looked down upon by the rest of society. Despite this, in his youth he managed to befriend Hodr and Sigyn, the future King and Queen of the Krisna Kingdom; and Zess, the younger brother of the Secretary of War of the Athens Commonwealth.

Years later, Rygart is reunited with Hodr and Sigyn where he learns the Athens Commonwealth has begun an invasion of Krisna. Rygart is also shocked to learn that Zess is leading one of the strike forces. While at the capital, Rygart discovers that he has the ability to pilot a recently discovered ancient Golem which cannot be piloted by magic users. Despite its ancient origins, the golem possesses capabilities and systems far more advanced than the current Golems, and could be key to turning the tide of battle. While hesitant at first, Rygart soon gets involved in the war between Krisna and Athens, in an attempt to save Hodr, Sigyn, and even Zess.

== Characters ==
=== The Kingdom of Krisna ===
Rygart Arrow (ライガット・アロー, Raigatto Arō)
Voiced by: Sōichirō Hoshi (Japanese); Greg Ayres (English)
Rygart is the series' main protagonist at the age of 25. He was born an "un-sorcerer", meaning that he cannot use magic, unlike the majority of his world's populace. Before he left to see Hodr, he worked on a farm with his brother who is also an un-sorcerer, and because of this, his father sold all Quartz operated tools and worked with tools without Quartz to make the boys stronger and to keep them from feeling like outcasts. After his father took out loans, Rygart was able to attend Assam military school where he befriended Zess, Hodr, and Sigyn where the four of them were known as "the four problem children of Assam's Military School", with him being known as the "King of Make-up tests". He hates violence and believes he could win via his opponent tiring out but is willing to fight more directly and violently with his enemies. He becomes the pilot of the Delphine, an ancient Golem designed for only an un-sorcerer's use as a Heavy Knight for Krisna. He originally joins the war to protect his brother and friends, but later admits he is really fighting to protect Sigyn who he really loves. Initially, Rygart is extremely hostile towards Girge when they are teamed up, yet acknowledges the other pilot's skills as a pilot. Rygart eventually comes to recognize Girge as an 'outcast' like himself, and is devastated after Girge sacrifices himself for Rygart. Rygart later spearheads the counter assault on Binonten and has a rematch with Borcuse, this time managing to kill the General, but is left with only more questions about his role in the war. After Borcuse's death, Rygart is promoted to Warrant Officer and given the title, "Hero of Krisna".
Sigyn Erster (シギュン・エルステル, Shigyun Erusuteru)
Voiced by: Chiwa Saito (Japanese); Emily Neves (English)
Sigyn is the 25-year-old Queen of Krisna and Hodr's wife and a close friend of Rygart. They went to the same military school as him, where she was known as the "Mad Scientist" for secluding herself in the school's lab for up to 3 days and nights at a time without eating or drinking. She pursues a career of science and cares deeply for her friends, to the point of pointing a gun at Rygart upon first seeing him to ask why he did not show up at her wedding and confirm that he does not hate her. While she is the Queen, she rarely acts like one as she usually spends her time in the castle maintenance workshop tinkering with machines alongside the royal engineers. Even though she and Hodr are married, they both sleep in separate chambers. It is later revealed that Sigyn was in love with Rygart during their days in military school. When Rygart left school to take over his father's farm, Sigyn attempted to confess her feelings to him, but he purposely ignored her, not wanting Sigyn to live a life of ridicule as the wife of an unsorcerer. Even after her marriage to Hodr, she still loves Rygart. While complimenting each other on their hair, Cleo says "Blonde hair...Is much prettier" to which an exhausted Sigyn replies "Black...For one single moment...I...Really....Liked it". Sigyn later petitions Hodr for a divorce, but he has yet to give her an answer. Regardless, Sigyn has been spending more and more time with Rygart in an attempt to help him overcome the guilt and trauma he has experienced on the battlefield.
Hodr (ホズル (クリシュナ9世), Hozuru)
Voiced by: Yuichi Nakamura (Japanese); Kalob Martinez (English)
Hodr is the 25-year-old king of Krisna and Sigyn's husband. He befriended Rygart at Assam military school when he ditched class to help him save an owl after he spotted him from his classroom's window. He was known as the "Crowned Prince" for staring at the sky and scoring failing grades. He does not want to be king, but tries to be a good leader and cares greatly for his people's lives. Despite being married with Sigyn, he does not shows any feelings for his wife and is aware she loves Rygart. During the cease-fire before the Battle of Binonten, Hodr reveals to Rygart that he has lost all romantic interest in Sigyn and that she has petitioned him for a divorce but later put it on hold. He then berates Rygart for not being honest about his feelings for Sigyn. In truth, he still loves Sigyn. However he suppresses it because he always knew Sigyn and Rygart have always loved each other. He has a younger sister named Lindy who is married to a General from the Orlando Empire.
Narvi Stryze (ナルヴィ・ストライズ, Naruvi Sutoraizu)
Voiced by: Marina Inoue (Japanese); Shelley Calene-Black (English)
Narvi is a 24-year-old female Upper Class Heavy Knight from Krisna. She previously served under General True before being assigned to command her own squad. As a squad leader she has a tendency to be brash and impulsive, always trying to be at the front of battle. Her actions are the result of her desire to prove her worth as a field commander, so that she may be able to serve in General True's inner circle of officers. She is devastated after finding that General True was killed in battle. After the Battle of Binonten, Narvi is promoted and becomes one of General Baldr's front-line commanders. She also receives a prototype new-model Golem with greater speed and maneuverability. She has feelings for Rygart.
Nile Stryze (ナイル・ストライズ, Nairu Sutoraizu)
Voiced by: Minoru Shiraishi (Japanese); Dylan Godwin (Films 1-4), Andrew Love (Film 6) (English)
Nile is Narvi's older brother and a First Class Heavy Knight.
Loggin (ロギン・ジー・ガルフ・エンサンス, Rogin Jī Garufu Ensansu)
Voiced by: Tomoya Kawai (Japanese); David Matranga (English)
A 29-year-old male Upper First Class Heavy Knight from Krisna who serves as a mech sniper. It is implied that he has a crush on Narvi.
General Baldr (バルド・ジ・アラン・アルヴァトロス, Barudo Ji Aran Aruvatorosu)
Voiced by: Masashi Sugawara (Japanese); Rob Mungle (English)
A calm General and brilliant strategist. He is one of Krisna's most prized generals. He serves as a mentor to Rygart on becoming a soldier and is also his Commanding officer. He has a son named Girge but has since disowned him due to the latter killing one of his fellow cadets and injuring 8 others during a training exercise without reason. Baldr was away on border patrol when that incident occurred and has never been able to get the full story from his son or the reasons for his actions. Baldr attempts to ease Rygart's conscious after he delivers Girge's body to him. Baldr has shown great concern for Rygart, seeing how the pressures and traumas of the war have weighed on Rygart's mind, and is afraid they may drive Rygart down the same path that ultimately 'broke' his son.
General True (トゥル・バー・コールウェイ・リムレック, Turu Bā Kōruwei Rimurekku)
Voiced by: Kenichi Ogata (Japanese); Chris Ayres (English)
A hot-headed General of Krisna who always immediately runs into the battle without strategy much to the trouble of those under his command. Despite these flaws, he is well loved by the people of Krisna due to donating all of his money to the orphanages of Krisna and even taking care of the orphans himself with two of those orphans being Narvi and Nile. He is killed at the end of Volume 4 due to his hot-headed impatience leading his forces right into an obvious ambush by the Athens Invasion Force.
Captain Sakura (サクラ, Sakura)
Voiced by: Nanaho Katsuragi (Japanese); Luci Christian (Films 1, 3-6), Melissa Davis (Film 2) (English)
A tall female military instructor for Krisna. She is an expert in close quarter melee combat.
Girge (ジルグ・ジ・レド・レ・アルヴァトロス, Jirugu Ji Redo Re Aruvatorosu)
Voiced by: Kōsuke Toriumi (Japanese); Corey Hartzog (English)
A gifted mech pilot from Krisna and General Baldr's son. He was formerly serving in prison for killing one of his fellow cadets without reason during training but when Krisna needed more skilled mech pilots for the war, he is granted supervised release and assigned to Narvi's squad to help the war effort. He is skilled in sniping and using a Katana with his Golem, a modified Athens's Artemis and takes the opportunity when given the chance to fight other skilled mechs whether they be comrade or foe. Due to his attitude and past actions, General Baldr has ordered his squad-mates to execute him should Girge try to attack any of them. His instability was the result of the pressure trying to live up to people's expectations who expected him to follow in his father's footsteps. But what may have started his instability was when during his childhood, he and his father rescued a village from a group of escaped prisoners where he allowed his father to shoot him in the leg as a distraction when one of the prisoners took him hostage. Girge fights against several of General Borcuse's elite guard while protecting Rygart and the rest of his squad. He manages to severely damage or disable all of their heavy mechs before finally being disabled and captured. He is later killed by Borcuse by fooling the General into believing he is the pilot of the Delphine.
Regatz Arrow (レガッツ・アロー, Regattsu Arō)
Voiced by: Masumi Asano (Japanese); Luci Christian (English)
Rygart's younger brother. Like his brother, Regatz too is also an un-sorcerer.

=== Commonwealth of Athens ===
Zess (ゼス, Zesu)
Voiced by: Hiroshi Kamiya (Japanese); Leraldo Anzaldua (English)
Zess is a 25-year-old soldier of Athens. He met Rygart at Assam military school, where he was called "straight-laced Zess". He was the best pilot cadet in the academy's history and was full of pride. He first met Rygart when Rygart was being bullied and refused to stand up for himself. Zess defended him and quickly befriended Rygart afterward. When he learns his nation plans to conquer Krisna, he leads his Valkyrie Squadron, a small commando strike force of mechs to the Krisna capital in order to make Hodr surrender quickly to spare his friends and their country from the wrath of the main Athens Invasion Army, unaware that the leaders of Athens gave an unofficial condition of surrendering to Hodr: The execution of the whole royal family, including Sigyn. Ultimately his mission is a failure which costs the lives of two of his subordinates and the capture of Cleo. In his last confrontation with Rygart, he is critically injured when his cockpit is crushed. He returns home to his wife and two-year-old daughter, all the while greatly regretting the consequences that awaits Krisna by the main Invasion force. After the death of General Borcuse, and at the request of his brother, he was ordered to lead the second Athenian invasion force. Zess's Valkyrie Squadron Golems are the lightweight mech, Artemis.
Cleo Saburafu (クレオ・サーブラフ, Kureo Sāburafu)
Voiced by: Kana Hanazawa (Japanese); Brittney Karbowski (English)
A subordinate of Zess, Cleo is a 12-year-old mech pilot who looks like a teenager; her friend Lee used to make fun of her for being extremely developed for her age. She is a quick learner, but despite this she is very clumsy and somewhat a slow thinker with some subjects. She says her positive skills are cooking, laundry, and keeping watch without even getting tired. She graduated from military school after two years, when it ordinarily takes six years. When Cleo learns that Lee was killed in battle, Cleo believes Rygart killed her (unaware that Lee committed suicide) and initially wants to kill him. Afterward, she meets Rygart in battle and shows a surprising amount of skill contrary to how she was before, almost defeating Rygart. She is defeated shortly after securing Zess's escape and taken prisoner, where she was treated very leniently and shared a room with Sigyn. She initially tried to escape by securing Sigyn's gun and attempting to kill Rygart, but fails because the gun actually had no ammo. She befriends Sigyn and no longer tries to escape afterward. Later, she is released in a hostage exchange for Rygart and his squad. Her family has been serving the Athens military for three generations, with her grandmother a retired mech pilot who is now an Athens military academy instructor and her mother, a high-ranking officer in the Athens military.
Erekt (エレクト・ヴェーミンガム, Erekuto Vēmingamu)
Voiced by: Hideyuki Umezu (Japanese); Andy McAvin (English)
A soldier of Athens and a subordinate of Zess. He is Zess's second in command.
Lee (リィ・シウルアン・シェーロン, Rii Shiuruan Shēron)
Voiced by: Yūko Kaida (Japanese); Maggie Flecknoe (English)
A soldier of Athens who detests Krisna for their supposed "ruthless" acts during the previous war, though she seems unaware of Athens's own acts during it. She is friends with Cleo, where both of them went to military school together. During the attack at the Krisna's capital, Lee commits suicide after being saved by Rygart from another Krisna soldier attempting to finish her off, believing being dead is much better than being a prisoner of the Krisna "barbarians", devastating Rygart.
Argath (アルガス・ルイビル・デ・ベッツバーグ, Arugasu Ruibiru De Bettsubāgu)
Voiced by: Kenichi Ogata (Japanese); Corey Hartzog (English)
A soldier of Athens and a subordinate of Zess. He is the first to be killed by the Delphine.
Loquis (ロキス, Rokisu)
Voiced by: Takaya Hashi (Japanese); David Matranga (English)
The Secretary of War of the Commonwealth of Athens and Zess's older brother. He is the mastermind of the Athens Invasion of Krisna. Officially, he claims the invasion was to punish Krisna for harboring troops from Orlando, Athens' longtime enemy, during the previous war. However, in reality it is an excuse to claim Krisna's rich, extensive quartz mines as Athens' own quartz resources are dwindling. After Borcuse's death it is revealed that Loquis is suffering from a terminal illness and is bedridden. At his order, he promotes Zess to General and appoints him as the leader of the Second Krishna Invasion Force. He also asks for Zess to protect and raise his young son.
General Borcuse (ボルキュス・デュッセンルドルフ, Borukyusu Dyussenrudorufu)
Voiced by: Kazuya Nakai (Japanese); Jay Hickman (English)
One of Athens's most infamous Generals. To his subordinates, he is seen as a loving father and a good friend, but in reality, he is a cold and calculating man who will not hesitate to commit heinous acts of barbarism to achieve his goals. Borcuse was placed under house arrest for committing a war crime during the Invasion of Assam, where he slaughtered innocent villagers and displayed their bodies as a way to intimidate and bait his enemies. The Athens government pardons Borcuse and makes him leader of the Krisna Invasion Force, believing that his tactics, while brutal, are the fastest way to defeat Krisna. He is a highly skilled mech pilot and is accompanied by five other specially chosen pilots who serve as his elite guard and troop commanders. When Borcuse attempts to slaughter a village to goad the Krisna forces, he is confronted by Rygart and the two duel. Rygart manages to deal a significant amount of damage to Borcuse's Golem but the General becomes 'bored' and disables the Delphine. Recognizing that the Delphine is ancient technology, Borcuse orders Rygart to be killed and his mech taken back to Athens but Rygart managed to escape, dealing a blow to Borcuse's pride. Borcuse's reputation suffers another blow when Girge duels and kills one of his commanders, Bades including the elite Golems that were accompanying Bades. Girge and Rygart are captured and brought before Borcuse where he proceeds to shoot Girge in the head prior to a prisoner exchange. Borcuse and Rygart engage in a rematch at the end of the Siege of Binonten, in which Rygart ultimately emerges the victor. Initially ordered to be taken as a prisoner, Borcuse taunts Rygart with memories of Girge, causing Rygart to kill the General. Borcuse's Golem is the Hykelion, a giant, black mech that possess a pair of "scorpion tails" on the shoulders that he uses as a secret weapon which he hides under his mech's cape.
Colonel Io (イオ・カルダバール, Io Karudabāru)
Voiced by: Takuma Terashima (Japanese); David Wald (English)
Borcuse's second in command. Relatively young for a field commander, Io is greatly respected for both his prowess in battle and his abilities as a tactician. While he appears intimidating, due to his tall height and a large prominent scar on his face, Io is a kind man who treats civilians and children with respect. Io disapproves of the barbaric acts that Borcuse and his fellow commanders commit against civilians and enemy combatants. He is also in a relationship with Borcuse's daughter. As one of Borcuse's elite guard and commanders, Io rides the Toria, a blue-colored customized Golem which utilizes both swords and guns. After Borcuse is killed, Io returns to Athens and resigns from the military, guilt-ridden over his perceived inability to protect Borcuse and his fellow commanders.
Bades (バデス・セロフ・ウリヤノフスク, Badesu Serofu Uriyanofusuku)
Voiced by: Kazuyoshi Hayashi (Japanese); Chris Hutchison (English)
One of Borcuse's elite guards and commanders. A bald, middle-aged man, he is Borcuse's Lieutenant and strategist. Unfortunately, Nike has no respect for him and usually insults him if his plans fails or makes fun of his baldness. After he and Borcuse's men were ambushed by Girge, which resulted in the death of several Athens pilots including his comrade Iris, he returns to face Girge again with the Spartans, an elite group of Athens pilots with customized Golems where he tries to convince Girge to side with Athens instead. However, Girge refuses and proceeds to kill all of the Spartans before finally killing Bades himself. His name is derived from the Greek god Hades. Bades' rides a customized gold-colored golem whose primary weapons are a heavy gun-lance and a powerful shoulder-mounted cannon.
Iris (アイレス・パトバ・アレッサンドリア, Airesu Patoba Aressandoria)
Voiced by: Katsuhisa Hōki
One of Borcuse's elite guards and commanders. He is the oldest among Borcuse's inner circle. Iris is the first of Borcuse's inner circle to die as he was killed by Girge in an ambush after he and the rest of Borcuse's army escapes their first battle with General Baldr's army. Iris rides a customized white golem whose primary weapon is a heavy quart battle-ax.
Nike (ニケ（ニーナケラ・ドルネイ）, Nike (Nīnakera Dorunei))
Voiced by: Ryoko Shiraishi (Japanese); Melissa Davis (English)
One of Borcuse's elite guards and one of the two female commanders in his inner circle besides Leto. Despite looking like a child, Nike is actually 25 years old. While she display a look of a sweet, innocent girl, in reality she is a sadistic killer who will not hesitate to kill anyone who angers her, whether they be enemy or ally. Io is the only one who can calm Nike as he treats her like a little sister. Nike's Golem is the heavy mech Giratos, whose primary weapon is a pair of bladed arm shields, which when paired with the golem's enhanced arm strength allows it to crush and split enemy golems in half. This was what she uses to kill General True in the series. The story in the manga version is, during her first meeting with Girge, he disabled and used her Golem as a 'shield' while proceeding to damage the other Athens Golems, dealing a huge blow to her ego. Her second encounter with Girge fares no better as her Golem is decapitated. Making her way back to the main forces on foot, she encounters and battles Narvi, but in the end Narvi succeeds in shooting Nike through the heart, killing her but not before Narvi comforts her at her last moments.
Leto (レト・エルク・ズク・キロフスキー, Reto Eruku Zuku Kirofusukī)
Voiced by: Eri Kitamura
One of Borcuse's elite guards and one of the two female commanders in his inner circle besides Nike. She serves as the intelligences officer and mech sniper. She also has feelings for Io. She joined Bades and the Spartans in their battle against Girge and was the only survivor, due in thanks that she was the group's sniper and suffered only minimal damage in that battle. After Borcuse's death and her return to Athens, she is deeply upset when she learns that Io has resigned from the military. She confronts him and berates him for 'betraying' their friends' memories and that he has an obligation to avenge them. Io agrees with her accusations, but she can only watch tearfully as he walks away saying that he no longer has the will to fight.
Leda (レダ・デュッセンルドルフ, Reda Dyussenrudorufu)
Voiced by: Nozomi Sasaki
General Borcuse's daughter. Leda is in love with Io and gets jealous if another woman is interested in him.

=== The Empire of Orlando ===
The Empress
A young girl who is the 162nd Empress of Orlando who is loved by her citizens. In reality, she is rather devious and calculating.
Aruvia
The Chief Cleric of Orlando.
General Cain
A General of Orlando and Hodr's brother in law. He was to lead the Orlando Expedition forces to help Krisna against the Athens Invasion force by the order of his Empress, but at the last moment she had him replaced with General Molak due to his relationship as King Hodr's brother in law as the Empress changed plans to have the Expedition forces intervene only after Athens severely weakened Krisna so they may eliminate both sides and take over Krisna for Orlando. Nevertheless, Cain joined the expedition, hoping to save both Hodr and Krisna.
General Molak
General Cain's replacement for the Orlando Expedition forces. Molak is a masked young woman who is very loyal to her country yet is smart to realize the politics being played in the empire. While she has orders to ensure Cain does not interfere in her mission, she still respects him and gives him some leeway over his concern for his brother in law.
Lindy
General Cain's wife, Hodr's younger sister and Sigyn's sister in law. She is a good friend of the Empress.
Greta (グレタ, Gureta)
Voiced by: Kikuko Inoue (Japanese); Elizabeth Bunch (English)
A merchant and engineer who provides and assists Sigyn in making the Quartz armor and weapon for Rygart's Delphine during the sixth movie.

== Media ==
=== Manga ===
Written and illustrated by Yunosuke Yoshinaga, Broken Blade has been serialized by Flex Comix in the shōnen web manga anthologies Shōnen Blood in October and November 2006 issues and FlexComix Blood from January 1, 2007, to February 8, 2012, before moving to the seinen manga anthology Comic Meteo, where it was serialized from July 25, 2012, to October 2022. The series' individual chapters were collected into 20 tankōbon volumes.

The manga was previously licensed in North America by CMX, who released three volumes before shutting down. In September 2026, Titan Comics announced that it had licensed the series for English publication, with the first volume set to release in December.

No.	Release date	ISBN
1	April 10, 2007	978-4-7973-4142-3
2	September 12, 2007	978-4-7973-4433-2
3	March 12, 2008	978-4-7973-4704-3
4	September 11, 2008	978-4-7973-5015-9
5	February 10, 2009	978-4-7973-5290-0
6	July 9, 2009	978-4-7973-5543-7
7	December 11, 2009	978-4-7973-5754-7; 978-4-593-85628-2 (limited edition)
8	May 26, 2010	978-4-7973-5967-1
9	December 11, 2010	978-4-7973-6295-4; 978-4-593-85631-2 (limited edition)
10	August 12, 2011	978-4-7973-6628-0; 978-4-593-85633-6 (limited edition)
11	November 9, 2012 (limited edition); November 12, 2012 (regular edition)	978-4-593-85710-4; 978-4-593-85711-1 (limited edition)
12	June 12, 2013	978-4-593-85733-3
13	May 12, 2014	978-4-593-85776-0
14	April 11, 2015	978-4-593-85803-3
15	March 30, 2016	978-4-593-85830-9
16	August 8, 2017	978-4-593-85865-1
17	December 12, 2018	978-4-86675-042-2
18	March 17, 2020	978-4-86675-098-9
19	October 12, 2022	978-4-86675-245-7
20	October 12, 2022	978-4-86675-246-4

=== Films ===
The films were chief directed by Tetsurō Amino, directed by Nobuyoshi Habara, and produced by Production I.G and Xebec. The films' opening theme is "Fate", performed by Kokia. The closing theme song for the first five films is "Serious-Age" by Faylan, while the closing theme song for the sixth movie is "Nageki no Oto" (嘆きの音; 'The Wailing Sound'), performed by Kokia. While the films mostly follow the manga story, for episode six, the animators deviated from the manga to end the story with their own plot.

Sentai Filmworks has licensed the film series and released them on DVD and Blu-ray in 2012.

==== Film list ====
No.	Film title	Original release date	DVD/Blu-ray release date
1	"The Time of Awakening"; Transliteration: "Kakusei no Toki" (Japanese: 覚醒ノ刻)	May 29, 2010	July 23, 2010
In the continent of Cruzon, the people have the ability to use magic to manipulate Quartz. Rygart Arrow is a rarity as he is an Un-sorcerer, a person unable to use magic. He is invited to Binonten, the capital city of Krisna by Hodr and his wife Sigyn, his old classmates from the Assam Military Academy and the King and Queen of Krishna. However, he learns the nation of Assam has fallen due a coup d'état and is now under the Athens Commonwealth, who now set their sights to Krishna where a small Golem taskforce is heading to the capital led by their old Military Academy classmate, Zess. Hodr leads Rygart to a secret mine where he shows him a mysterious Golem they found built by the Ancients but are unable to pilot it. Rygart, pleads Hodr to surrender to the Athenians but Hodr reveals one of the terms of surrender the Athenians secretly want for Krishna is the execution of the Royal family including Sigyn which troubles Rygart. Just then, Zess forces have arrive and plans to quickly capture the King and make him surrender. Rygart accidentally gets into the Ancient Golem's cockpit and is able to pilot it and defeat one of Zess subordinates, Lee, thanks to its speed and reflexes. Zess arrives and defeats Rygart, but is forced to pull back with Lee when General Baldr and his men arrive. While Sigyn and her engineers try to repair the Ancient Golem, she is surprised of its excellent mobility and the way it was built. The next day, Zess's forces returns and attacks Binonten. Wanting to convince Zess to stop, Rygart takes the Ancient Golem as he is the only one who can pilot it and heads out to meet Zess.
2	"The Path of Separation"; Transliteration: "Ketsubetsu no Michi" (Japanese: 訣別ノ路)	June 26, 2010	August 27, 2010
The narration begins by revealing Athens invaded the Krisna Kingdom for their allowing the Orlando Empire to cross into their land to attack Athens during their power struggle over Assam, but the true purpose of the invasion is to take over the Krisna Quartz mines as Athens is suffering a shortage of Quartz. In the Athens capital of Ilios, Secretary of War Loquis receives news that his brother Zess has successfully reached Binonten. Meanwhile, Rygart manages to get a ceasefire between the Athens invaders and Krisna defenders and speaks with Zess. The two friends immediately talk about the war and Zess knows Orlando tricked Krisna during the Assam coup d'état and wants Hodr to surrender to spare Krisna from the Athens Invasion force. Realizing Zess does not know about the secret terms of surrender for the Royal family, Rygart tries to tell him but both are forced to fight when the advance of General True and his men breaks the ceasefire. Rygart escapes the battle but encounters and fights Lee instead and manages to destroy one of her Golem's arms, after which she is shot down by one of General Baldr's men named Dan. Rygart tries convincing Dan not to kill Lee but he is killed by her instead. After Rygart subdues her Golem, and not willing to become a prisoner of "barbarians" (a product of Athens propaganda), Lee commits suicide to Rygart's horror. It is not long until Zess and Cleo learn of Lee's fate. Devastated by Lee and Dan's deaths, Rygart decides to leave the capital, but after hearing about Hodr's decision to surrender and advice from General Baldr, Rygart changes his mind at the main gate and decides to join the war. Rygart is knighted a Heavy knight of Krisna and the official pilot of the Ancient Golem, now called Delphine.
3	"Scars from an Assassin's Blade"; Transliteration: "Kyōjin no Ato" (Japanese: 凶刃ノ痕)	September 25, 2010	January 28, 2011
Zess wonders about the terms of surrender Rygart was talking about as he and his squad prepares for one more attack at Binonten. As Rygart is being taught on using the Delphine and its new heavy armor, Sigyn wonders if he is capable of killing someone and Baldr warns him he has to work hard if he wants to save an enemy's life. Zess's squad begins their final attack but quickly aborts the mission once they realize the Krisna forces are following them. As they escape to the border, Rygart soon arrives and quickly kills one Zess's men, Argath which Zess stays back to fight him. Rygart at first is reluctant to hurt Zess but quickly puts it aside and seriously damages Zess's Golem and injures him. Cleo, devastated by the death of her comrades, fights Rygart in anger where she quickly defeats Rygart and fights against Baldr and his men alone. When Erekt manages to retrieve the injured Zess, Cleo tries to escape but her Golem is shot and disabled by Narvi, and tells Erekt to leave her behind and escape with Zess. While Rygart believes it's over, Baldr tells him they now must face the Athens Invasion force led by General Borcuse. In Athens, Borcuse is informed by his second in command, Colonel Io, that Secretary Loquis has manage to acquit the General's war crimes at Assam and made him commander of the Athens Invasion force where his soldiers are gathering at Ilios. Meanwhile in Binoten, Sigyn decides to have Cleo stay at her bed chambers instead of the dungeon, hoping she will cooperate and tell them about her Artemis Golem but Cleo takes her hostage to escape. As Cleo escapes while holding up Sigyn with her gun, they find Rygart talking to Hodr's pet owl Gram. Cleo at first is reluctant to shoot him upon hearing that Rygart is a friend of Zess and hopes for his safety but when she does tries to shoot him, she learns the gun is empty and is captured by the castle's guards. At Ilios, Loquis informs Borcuse of their nation's Quartz shortage and tells the General that he must do everything necessary to win and take over Krisna as his army heads out.
4	"The Land of Calamity"; Transliteration: "Sanka no Chi" (Japanese: 惨禍ノ地)	October 30, 2010	February 25, 2011
As Zess and Erekt returns to Athens, Krisna mobilizes their army to face the Athenian Invaders. Cleo continues living with Sigyn where the latter warns her not to harm Rygart again. Meanwhile, Sigyn assembles a special Golem force led by Narvi with Rygart, her older brother Nile and Sniper Loggin under her command including Girge. Girge is General Baldr's son and a talented Golem pilot who has been given Cleo's Golem but he is a former criminal who killed his teammates without reason which Baldr warns Rygart to be careful with his son and kill him if he does anything suspicious. As General True and General Baldr's forces head out, Rygart trains with his teammates to better use the Delphine while Hodr asks the Orlando Empire for help. Before leaving, Sigyn makes Rygart vow to come back safely. Unknown to Rygart and company, General True is ambushed by the Athenians led by Io and Nike, and is killed in battle. As a siege battle begins between Baldr and Borcuse forces, an officer named Elsa notices a small opportunity and convinces the General to let her lead a small Golem detachment to assault and kill Borcuse. Surprisingly, Borcuse and his men kill all of Elsa's forces despite being outnumbered 20 to 6. Borcuse orders Nike to drag and show Elsa's cockpit to the Krisnan defenders to demoralize them. However, Baldr rallies all of his Golems into attackong Borcuse's army. As Baldr's forces are cornered by Borcuse on both flanks, they are soon rescued by Rygart and his teammates by decimating the left flank, forcing Borcuse to order his army to retreat. As they escape into a valley, Borcuse's forces get ambushed by Girge who quickly subdues Nike's Golem and proceeds to fight Borcuse and his officers.
5	"The Gap Between Life and Death"; Transliteration: "Shisen no Hate" (Japanese: 死線ノ涯)	January 22, 2011	May 27, 2011
Girge is questioned by Narvi over his surprise attack against Borcuse forces and has him detained so he does not repeat his antics again. Later Loggin, Rygart and Nile learns about True's death but Nile is unsure whether to tell the true to Narvi. While Rygart and Baldr talk about Girge's past and Cleo learns more about Zess's academy days with Sigyn, the Athenian Invasion army have finally regroup and despite losing many Golems, Nike's ego badly bruised by Girge and the death of one of his officers, Borcuse is overjoyed at finding two worthy opponents to fight, particular Rygart and Girge. Rygart, after finding out that Borcuse is heading to his hometown where his little brother Regatz lives, disobeys Narvi's order to head home and search for his brother. However, when he arrives, the villagers have been killed by Borcuse's men. Borcuse is glad to see Rygart is here and has duel with him while his men are ordered to watched. After a long tenuous fight, Borcuse knocks out Rygart and orders his men to pry open the Delphine cockpit and kill the pilot before returning it to Athens. However, Rygart regains consciousness and is able to escape when his squad mates intervene. As they are about to fallback, the squad is intercepted by Io and Nike forces where Narvi, Loggin, and Nile's Golems are taken down. In the confusion, Girge runs away where Rygart chases after him where he has a duel with Rygart. As they battle, Girge mocks Rygart for defending the weak and reveals he knows the stories that Sigyn is in love with him and offers him the chance to make Sigyn his. But Rygart scoffs at Girge's ideals and tells him he should fight for Krisna just like his father and defeats him. Io and Nike's forces finally arrive where they corner both men and with the Delphine out of energy, Girge decides to save Rygart by kicking the Delphine into a valley while fighting against the enemy at the cost of his own life, killing many of them including Nike.
6	"Fortress of Lamentation"; Transliteration: "Dōkoku no Toride" (Japanese: 慟哭ノ砦)	March 26, 2011	July 22, 2011
After Girge's death, Baldr and his men carries Rygart and Delphine back to Binoten before the Athenians arrive. Borcuse decides to invade Binoten with his current forces without waiting for the rest of the Invasion force. Meanwhile, Narvi, Nile and Loggin manages to survive and try to return to Binoten with Nile's broken Golem. As Rygart becomes distraught over Girge's death, Sigyn, with the help of her engineers and an Orlando merchant named Greta, builds a new Quartz armor and weapon for Delphine. When Borcuse's forces finally arrive, he orders them to attack Binoten in three directions with Io and Bades leading the other two while Captain Sakura rallies the defenders. As Krisna and Athens fight a brutal battle inside the streets of Binoten, Rygart watches the battle from afar while Delphine's power source is recharging and is being fitted with new armor. Baldr and his men finally arrive where they battle Bades' men while Narvi, Nile and Loggin get new Golems to join the fight. After the Delphine power has finally been recharged, Rygart finally joins the battle and relieves Sakura as he battles Borcuse. During this confusion, Sigyn allows Cleo to escape but not before they say goodbye. As the battle rages on while Sigyn tries to finish the weapon, Baldr kills Bades, Nile finally defeats Io, leaving him alive and Rygart continues to battle Borcuse which the latter realize that the former is an Un-sorcerer. Sigyn finally finishes the Delphine's new weapon, a giant Shuriken with a harden quartz rope and gives it Rygart to fight against Borcuse. As everyone watches the battle between Rygart and Borcuse, Borcuse is able to dodge most of the attacks by the shuriken but Rygart finally lands a hit at Borcuse's Golem at the legs and damages the body. Borcuse comes out of his cockpit and keeps shooting at Rygart with his gun and after remembering his moments that led to the war, Rygart kills Borcuse. With Borcuse dead, his men immediately began to retreat thus ending the battle. In the aftermath, Nile and Loggin comforts Narvi after she learns of True's death, Loquis does not take the death of Borcuse's very well while Zess and Erekt goes searching for Cleo after hearing her escape and as Rygart, Hodr and Sigyn are reunited, Rygart cries with joy upon learning his brother Regatz is alive at Binoten.

=== Anime ===
The Broken Blade films were edited into a 12-episode anime series by Production I.G and Xebec, including new scenes. The series was aired between April and June 2014 on Tokyo MX and BS11 stations in Japan. Both OP and ending themes were performed by both Sayaka Sasaki and Aira Yuhki.

No.	Title	Original release date
1	"Un Sorcerer"; Transliteration: "An Sōsarā (Maryoku Musha)" (Japanese: アン・ソーサラー（魔力無者）)	April 6, 2014
2	"Under Golem"; Transliteration: "Andā Gouremu (Kodai Kyohei)" (Japanese: アンダー・ゴゥレム（古代巨兵）)	April 13, 2014
3	"Not Bad"; Transliteration: "Notto Baddo (Teisen Kōshō)" (Japanese: ノット・バッド（停戦交渉）)	April 20, 2014
4	"Cross Combat"; Transliteration: "Kurōsu Konbatto (Kinsetsu Sentō)" (Japanese: クロース・コンバット（近接戦闘）)	April 27, 2014
5	"Counter Attack"; Transliteration: "Kauntā Atakku (Gyaku Kyōshū)" (Japanese: カウンター・アタック（逆撃強襲）)	May 4, 2014
6	"World Wind"; Transliteration: "Wāru Uindo (Shippūdotō)" (Japanese: ワール・ウィンド（疾風怒濤）)	May 11, 2014
7	"Night Before"; Transliteration: "Naito Bifoa (Shutsugeki Zen'ya)" (Japanese: ナイト・ビフォア（出撃前夜）)	May 18, 2014
8	"Waste Land"; Transliteration: "Ueisuto Rando (Shichi Kyōhen)" (Japanese: ウェイスト・ランド（死地凶変）)	May 25, 2014
9	"Show Down"; Transliteration: "Shō Daun (Ryūko Sensen)" (Japanese: ショウ・ダウン（竜虎宣戦）)	June 1, 2014
10	"Lightning Speed"; Transliteration: "Raitoningu Supīdo (Shinsoku Musō)" (Japanese: ライトニング・スピード（神速無双）)	June 8, 2014
11	"Last Stand"; Transliteration: "Rasuto Sutando (Yōgai Kengo)" (Japanese: ラスト・スタンド（要害堅固）)	June 15, 2014
12	"Endless Fate"; Transliteration: "Endoresu Feito (Eigō Kaiki)" (Japanese: エンドレス・フェイト（永劫回帰）)	June 22, 2014
