= The Real O'Neals =

2016 American sitcom

- Genre: Sitcom
- Created by: Joshua Sternin; Jennifer Ventimilia
- Developed by: David Windsor; Casey Johnson
- Starring: Martha Plimpton; Jay R. Ferguson; Noah Galvin; Matthew Shively; Bebe Wood; Mary Hollis Inboden
- Narrated by: Noah Galvin
- Composer: Transcenders
- Country of origin: United States
- Original language: English
- No. of seasons: 2
- No. of episodes: 29

Production
- Executive producers: Casey Johnson; David Windsor; Stacy Traub; Todd Holland; Lorenzo di Bonaventura; Dan McDermott; Dan Savage; Brian Pines
- Producers: Pixie Wespiser; Kent Zbornak
- Cinematography: Joaquin Sedillo; Walt Fraser
- Camera setup: Single-camera
- Running time: 22 minutes
- Production companies: Windsor & Johnson Productions; di Bonaventura Television; ABC Studios

Original release
- Network: ABC
- Release: March 2, 2016 – March 14, 2017

The Real O'Neals is an American single-camera sitcom that aired on ABC from March 2, 2016, to March 14, 2017. The series, based on an idea by Dan Savage (who also served as an executive producer), was picked up to series on May 7, 2015. The series was renewed for a second season on May 12, 2016, which premiered on October 11, 2016.

On May 11, 2017, ABC canceled the series after two seasons.

== Plot ==
This series follows the turbulent day-to-day life of a dysfunctional yet close Chicago Catholic family as their formerly exemplary reputation suffers in their community when it is learned that matriarch Eileen and her husband, Pat, are seeking a divorce. Their oldest son, Jimmy, is anorexic. Their middle child, Kenny, is gay. Their youngest, Shannon, is questioning her faith.

== Cast and characters ==
=== Main ===
- Martha Plimpton as Eileen O'Neal, the matriarch of the O'Neal family. She is a judgemental perfectionist and is obsessed with her family's image in their Irish Catholic community. She struggles to loosen her controlling nature over her family.
- Jay R. Ferguson as Pat O'Neal, a Chicago Police Department officer. He is more laid-back than Eileen and often struggles with her obsessive need for control. He moves into the basement of their house during their separation.
- Noah Galvin as Kenneth "Kenny" Christopher Sebastian O'Neal, the 16-year-old middle child who comes out to his family as gay. His voice-over to the series comes from his internal thoughts and often features surreal fantasies.
- Matthew Shively as James "Jimmy" O'Neal, the eldest child of the three O'Neal siblings. He is a wrestler who struggles with anorexia. Jimmy is a simple-minded and positive person.
- Bebe Wood as Shannon O'Neal, the 14-year-old youngest child and the only daughter who is questioning her faith. She admits to being a kleptomaniac in the pilot episode.
- Mary Hollis Inboden as Jodi O'Neal, Pat's ex-sister-in-law and closest friend.

=== Recurring ===
- Matt Oberg as Vice Principal Clive Murray, Eileen's boyfriend and Pat's friend
- Ramona Young as Allison Adler-Wong, Kenny's lesbian friend and the other member of the school's LGBT club
- Hannah Marks as Mimi Waxberg, Kenny's ex-girlfriend
- Sean Grandillo as Brett Young, Kenny's first boyfriend
- Sarayu Blue as Marcia Worthman
- Brian Huskey as Father Phil
- Caleb Pierce as Stuart
- Madison Iseman as Madison
- Kaylee Bryant as Lacey
- Laura Napoli as Bebe Wood
- Jeremy Lawson as Jesus (Kenny's "shoulder angel")
- Angela Kinsey as Sheila DeMars, Eileen's rival
- Jessica-Snow Wilson as Gloria, Pat's colleague and love interest
- Christopher Avila as Ethan, Shannon's boyfriend
- Ray Ford as Steve the Colorist, Jodi's colleague
- Lizzie White as Claire, Shannon's friend

=== Guest ===
- Jimmy Kimmel as himself
- Garrett Clayton as Ricky
- Madison Pettis as Chloe Perrente
- Caroline Morahan as Maleficent (Kenny's "shoulder devil")
- Frances Conroy as Grandma Agnes
- Phil LaMarr as Archie, Pat's partner
- Ian Gomez as Michael-Gregory
- Noah Crawford as Drew
- Scott Menville as Gangbanger ("Pilot") and Tony ("The Real Halloween")
- Cheyenne Jackson as Mr. Peters
- Marija Omaljev-Grbić as Dream Woman
- Jordin Sparks as herself
- Tim Gunn as himself
- RuPaul as himself
- Tyler Oakley as himself
- Lance Bass as himself
- Jane Lynch as herself
- Gus Kenworthy as himself
- Robbie Rogers as himself
- Antonia Lofaso as herself
- Alex Guarnaschelli as herself
- Graham Elliot as himself

== Episodes ==
=== Series overview ===
Season	Episodes	Originally released	
Season	Episodes	First released	Last released
1	13	March 2, 2016	May 24, 2016
2	16	October 11, 2016	March 14, 2017

=== Season 1 (2016) ===
No. overall	No. in season	Title	Directed by	Written by	Original release date	Prod. code	US viewers (millions)
1	1	"Pilot"	Todd Holland	Story by : Joshua Sternin & Jennifer Ventimilia; Teleplay by : Casey Johnson & David Windsor and Joshua Sternin & Jennifer Ventimilia	March 2, 2016	101	6.33
The picture perfect O'Neals is fractured when long held confession are revealed.
2	2	"The Real Papaya"	Todd Holland	Casey Johnson & David Windsor	March 2, 2016	102	6.01
Following the "coming out" confessions made by everyone in the O'Neal family, Eileen is desperate to control the situation and tries to make Kenny "un-gay." Meanwhile, Kenny tries to find the right time to break up with his girlfriend and has a heart-to-heart with late-night host Jimmy Kimmel.
3	3	"The Real Lent"	Todd Holland	Scott King	March 8, 2016	106	3.99
Eileen reminds her family that it's Lent and asks them to give up things they really love. In a chance meeting, Kenny meets his first gay crush, and Pat discovers his little girl, Shannon, is all grown up.
4	4	"The Real F Word"	Christine Gernon	Stacy Traub	March 15, 2016	103	3.47
Kenny faces his first day at school after coming out.
5	5	"The Real Spring Fever"	Phil Traill	Kristin Newman	March 22, 2016	105	3.75
Eileen decides it's time to get a fresh start in her life by applying for her first job since her kids were born. Meanwhile, Pat realizes he might not be ready for the single life just yet, even though his patrol partner, Archie, thinks otherwise. And as Kenny wonders who he will date next, Jimmy takes it upon himself to help him explore the newfound world of online dating.
6	6	"The Real Man"	Elliot Hegarty	Adam Roberts	March 29, 2016	111	3.67
When Pat and Jimmy's annual camping trip rolls around, Kenny tags along to prove he is still manly even if he is gay. Meanwhile, after Eileen discovers Shannon has been skipping her classes and refuses confirmation, she invites Father Phil over to help answer Shannon's challenging questions about Catholicism.
7	7	"The Real Grandma"	Silver Tree	Cheryl Holliday	April 5, 2016	108	3.65
When Eileen's strict, racist, Catholic-abiding mother arrives unannounced at the O'Neals' home, Eileen tries to present the picture of a "happy family", despite the recent events.
8	8	"The Real Book Club"	Victor Nelli, Jr.	Sonny Lee	April 19, 2016	104	2.98
Eileen faces her book club for the first time since her family's issues have come to light. Kenny's first trip to the "gayborhood" coffee shop is everything he'd hoped for, until Pat tags along with him to a gay dodgeball match.
9	9	"The Real Wedding"	Rebecca Asher	Becky Mann & Audra Sielaf	April 26, 2016	109	3.46
Kenny auditions for the school play and Eileen volunteers to help out. Kenny receives the role of Romeo, but is dismayed to learn his ex-girlfriend Mimi is playing Juliet. Things get more awkward when Eileen treats the play's wedding scene like an actual wedding.
10	10	"The Real Retreat"	Todd Holland	Lewaa Nasserdeen	May 3, 2016	110	3.29
When Jimmy is named Faith Leader for the weekend at the Catholic Youth Retreat, a jealous Kenny takes on his older brother's role as ring leader of the bad kids. Home alone without the kids, Pat invites a new lady friend over, and Eileen enlists Jodi to spy on them.
11	11	"The Real Other Woman"	Rebecca Asher	Kevin Biegel	May 10, 2016	107	3.15
After Eileen pushes Kenny to get a job, she feels jealous when he starts to work as a tutor and bonds with the student's mom. Meanwhile, Pat wants to bond more with the kids but makes questionable choices in trying to become the fun parent.
12	12	"The Real Rules"	Eyal Gordin	Kristin Newman	May 17, 2016	112	3.25
After realizing Pat left his police badge at home, Jimmy convinces Kenny and Shannon that he should use the badge to pretend he's a police officer in order to get free perks around town. Meanwhile, when Pat tells Eileen about an upcoming date he's going on, she takes matters into her own hands when it comes to a potential suitor in her dating life.
13	13	"The Real Prom"	Todd Holland	Story by : Stacy Traub; Teleplay by : Casey Johnson & David Windsor	May 24, 2016	113	4.21
As the school prom approaches, Kenny and Jimmy try to come up with the perfect prom-posal for the classmates (who already have dates) they each have set their sights on. Shannon thinks prom is a scam and would rather stay at home, but once Pat discovers she was asked to attend, he tries to convince her to go.

=== Season 2 (2016–17) ===
No. overall	No. in season	Title	Directed by	Written by	Original release date	Prod. code	US viewers (millions)
14	1	"The Real Thang"	Todd Holland	Casey Johnson & David Windsor	October 11, 2016	201	3.76
For National Coming Out Day, Kenny starts an LGBT club at school; but the only other members are Jimmy and shy lesbian student Allison. Kenny stridently insists that Allison mark the day by coming out to her parents, but after learning that they are openly hostile to the LGBT community he reconsiders and tells her to come out when she's ready. Eileen has secretly been meeting Clive over the summer, but after she rejects him he befriends Pat. A jealous Eileen finally goes on a real date with Clive. Jodi is invited to represent a local clothing store in a fashion show; she backs out after learning that the store is for plus-size women, but Eileen convinces her to participate and "come out" as a woman who is proud of her body.
15	2	"The Real Dates"	Eyal Gordin	Kristin Newman	October 18, 2016	202	2.91
Eileen and VP Murray's secret dating life is about to be unraveled, Kenny jumps into the world of gay dating apps but feels discouraged after not getting enough swipes to the right, and Jimmy goes too far to declare his love for Lacey.
16	3	"The Real Halloween"	Silver Tree	Stacy Traub	October 25, 2016	203	3.22
Eileen's tolerance is tested when she allows Kenny to throw his own Halloween party to stop him from going to Boystown to watch the costume parade.
17	4	"The Real Move"	Jaffar Mahmood	Becky Mann & Audra Sielaff	November 1, 2016	204	2.73
When VP Murray starts spending time around the house, Pat realizes it's time to move out. Meanwhile, Eileen starts her new job at Aunt Jodi's salon, and when the kids discover how unhappy their parents were during their 18 years of marriage, they stage a celebratory "divorce ceremony."
18	5	"The Real Tradition"	Rebecca Asher	Steve Joe	November 15, 2016	205	3.56
Pat and Eileen invite Gloria and VP Murray as their dates to the O'Neals' Thanksgiving dinner, changing their tradition.
19	6	"The Real Fit"	Elliot Hegarty	Sam Laybourne	November 29, 2016	206	3.29
Pat's brother Dwayne comes to town to help Pat build his new tiny house in the garage. Meanwhile, when Eileen becomes addicted to a CrossFit class she's taking with Kenny, he must find a way to break the cult-like hold it has over her.
20	7	"The Real Match"	Todd Holland	Adam Roberts	December 6, 2016	207	3.05
Kenny has a surprise victory after reluctantly joining Jimmy's wrestling team for a one-time match. Pat hurts his back when he tries to help Eileen get ready for a weekend getaway.
21	8	"The Real Christmas"	Rebecca Asher	Rob Sudduth	December 13, 2016	208	3.06
Determined to win the Christmas choir competition, Eileen gives the solo to the newest member. Jimmy spies on a rival choir. Shannon asks Pat about a present she wants to give to Ethan.
22	9	"The Real Sin"	Jude Weng	Cheryl Holliday	January 3, 2017	209	3.29
With the divorce final, Eileen faces other obstacles to being with VP Murray that make her doubt her desires. Kenny gets a tattoo to impress Brett. Shannon protests the dissection of frogs at school.
23	10	"The Real Acceptance"	Victor Nelli, Jr.	Josh Kirby & Jon Veles	January 17, 2017	210	2.81
Jimmy does well on his SATs and is rewarded by going car shopping with Eileen. Meanwhile, Kenny struggles to find a way to tell his parents that he and Brett are officially a couple.
24	11	"The Real Third Wheel"	Todd Holland	Becky Mann & Audra Sielaff	February 7, 2017	211	2.79
Kenny's jealousy over Brett's relationship with his best girl friend leads Kenny to realize he's been a bad friend to Allison. Jimmy and Shannon start their own vehicle for hire company; meanwhile, Eileen and Pat are shocked to catch Clive "cheating" on them, but ultimately discover that the three of them make a pretty good "throuple."
25	12	"The Real Brother's Keeper"	Eyal Gordin	Steve Joe	February 14, 2017	212	2.87
Jimmy wants to teach his younger brother the rite of passage of drinking. When Shannon gets a comp hotel room, Jimmy thinks this is the perfect time to teach Kenny how to drink, but it all goes awry when Kenny invites Brett to join in. Meanwhile, Eileen discovers that Pat has a new girlfriend.
26	13	"The Real Confirmation"	Todd Holland	Billy Finnegan	February 21, 2017	213	2.93
When Shannon asks VP Murray to be her godfather leading up to her confirmation, Eileen fears her own relationship with him might be moving too fast. Meanwhile, Brett says, "I love you," sending Kenny into a tailspin.
27	14	"The Real Heartbreak"	Kevin Bray	Rob Sudduth	February 28, 2017	214	3.34
It is Valentine's Day and Kenny is depressed since his break up with Brett. During their Lonely Hearts happy hour, Pat and Jimmy use him to get whatever they want from women. However, everything goes wrong when Kenny disappears. Meanwhile, Eileen refuses to do Valentine's Day, arguing it is a commercial ploy.
28	15	"The Real Mr. Nice Guy"	Jaffar Mahmood	Adam Roberts	March 7, 2017	215	2.87
Kenny convinces VP Murray to hire a gay teacher, but Kenny's loyalties are tested when the teachers starts to make Jimmy's life miserable; Pat's courteous nature robs him of a winning lottery ticket.
29	16	"The Real Secrets"	Todd Holland	Story by : Stacy Traub; Teleplay by : Casey Johnson & David Windsor	March 14, 2017	216	2.67
VP Murray talks to Pat about his plans to propose to Eileen; Eileen and Kenny help Allison deal with her close-minded parents; Shannon and Jimmy find a pregnancy test.

== Ratings ==
=== Season 1 ===
No.	Title	Air date	Rating/share (18–49)	Viewers (millions)	DVR (18–49)	DVR viewers (millions)	Total (18–49)	Total viewers (millions)
1	"Pilot"	March 2, 2016	1.8/6	6.33	TBA	TBA	TBA	TBA
2	"The Real Papaya"	March 2, 2016	1.9/6	6.01	TBA	TBA	TBA	TBA
3	"The Real Lent"	March 8, 2016	1.1/4	3.99	TBA	TBA	TBA	TBA
4	"The Real F Word"	March 15, 2016	1.0/4	3.47	TBA	TBA	TBA	TBA
5	"The Real Spring Fever"	March 22, 2016	1.0/4	3.75	TBA	TBA	TBA	TBA
6	"The Real Man"	March 29, 2016	1.0/4	3.67	TBA	TBA	TBA	TBA
7	"The Real Grandma"	April 5, 2016	1.0/4	3.65	TBA	TBA	TBA	TBA
8	"The Real Book Club"	April 19, 2016	0.8/3	2.98	TBA	TBA	TBA	TBA
9	"The Real Wedding"	April 26, 2016	1.0/4	3.46	TBA	TBA	TBA	TBA
10	"The Real Retreat"	May 3, 2016	0.9/3	3.29	TBA	TBA	TBA	TBA
11	"The Real Other Woman"	May 10, 2016	0.9/3	3.15	TBA	TBA	TBA	TBA
12	"The Real Rules"	May 17, 2016	0.9/3	3.25	TBA	TBA	TBA	TBA
13	"The Real Prom"	May 24, 2016	1.1/4	4.21	TBA	TBA	TBA	TBA

=== Season 2 ===
Viewership and ratings per episode of The Real O'Neals
No.	Title	Air date	Rating/share (18–49)	Viewers (millions)	DVR (18–49)	DVR viewers (millions)	Total (18–49)	Total viewers (millions)
1	"The Real Thang"	October 11, 2016	1.2/4	3.76	TBD	TBD	TBD	TBD
2	"The Real Dates"	October 18, 2016	0.9/3	2.91	TBD	TBD	TBD	TBD
3	"The Real Halloween"	October 25, 2016	1.0/3	3.22	TBD	TBD	TBD	TBD
4	"The Real Move"	November 1, 2016	0.8/3	2.73	TBD	TBD	TBD	TBD
5	"The Real Tradition"	November 15, 2016	1.1/4	3.56	TBD	TBD	TBD	TBD
6	"The Real Fit"	November 29, 2016	1.0/3	3.29	TBD	TBD	TBD	TBD
7	"The Real Match"	December 6, 2016	0.8/3	3.05	TBD	TBD	TBD	TBD
8	"The Real Christmas"	December 13, 2016	0.9/4	3.06	TBD	TBD	TBD	TBD
9	"The Real Sin"	January 3, 2017	1.0/4	3.29	TBD	TBD	TBD	TBD
10	"The Real Acceptance"	January 17, 2017	0.8/3	2.81	TBD	TBD	TBD	TBD
11	"The Real Third Wheel"	February 7, 2017	0.9/3	2.79	TBD	TBD	TBD	TBD
12	"The Real Brother's Keeper"	February 14, 2017	0.8/3	2.87	TBD	TBD	TBD	TBD
13	"The Real Confirmation"	February 21, 2017	0.9/3	2.93	TBD	TBD	TBD	TBD
14	"The Real Heartbreak"	February 28, 2017	1.0/4	3.34	TBD	TBD	TBD	TBD
15	"The Real Mr. Nice Guy"	March 7, 2017	0.9/3	2.87	TBD	TBD	TBD	TBD
16	"The Real Secrets"	March 14, 2017	0.8/3	2.67	TBD	TBD	TBD	TBD

== Reception ==
=== Ratings ===
Season	Time slot (ET/PT)	Episodes	Season premiere		Season finale		TV season	Rank	Viewers (in millions)
Season	Time slot (ET/PT)	Episodes	Date	Viewers (in millions)	Date	Viewers (in millions)	TV season	Rank	Viewers (in millions)
1	Wednesday 8:30 pm (episode 1); Wednesday 9:30 pm (episode 2); Tuesday 8:30 pm (episodes 3–13)	13	March 2, 2016	6.33	May 24, 2016	4.21	2015–16	#106	4.46
2	Tuesday 9:30 pm	16	October 11, 2016	3.76	March 14, 2017	2.67	2016–17	#118	3.71

=== Critical reception ===
The series received a generally favorable response from critics. On review aggregator site Metacritic, The Real O'Neals has a metascore of 62 out of 100 based on 22 critics signifying "generally favorable reviews". On another review aggregator site Rotten Tomatoes, the show has a 67% approval rating, based on 27 reviews, with an average rating of 6.4/10. The site's critical consensus: "Funny writing and a solid cast save The Real O'Neals from traditional sitcom perils."

=== Awards and nominations ===
Year	Award	Category	Nominee(s)	Outcome
2016	Dorian Awards	LGBTQ Show of the Year	The Real O'Neals	Nominated
2016	Dorian Awards	Unsung TV Show of the Year	The Real O'Neals	Won
2017	Humanitas Prize	30 Minute Network or Syndicated Television	Episode: "The Real Grandma"	Nominated
2017	Primetime Emmy Award	Outstanding Choreography	The Real O'Neals	Nominated

== Controversies ==
=== News of the series' pickup ===
The news of the series' pick-up attracted attention and controversy before its debut. On May 12, 2015, the day it was announced that the series had been added to the ABC network schedule, Christian right groups such as the American Family Association and the Family Research Council called for a boycott and petitioned to prevent the series from airing. They also cited Savage's views on religion, sexuality, and same-sex marriage, which they believed had been infused into the series due to it being based on his life, but Savage claimed that the concept went in a different direction since he was not involved in the writing.

=== Bisexual joke ===
The second-season episode "The Real Acceptance" featured a joke regarding bisexuals, in which Kenny, who is openly gay, compared being bisexual to having "webbed toes" or "money problems". Bisexual actor Sara Ramirez, who played the bisexual character Callie Torres on Grey's Anatomy, criticized ABC and the series, finding the joke offensive.
