= List of Red Garden episodes =

The anime series Red Garden first aired on TV Tokyo in Japan on October 3, 2006, with the episode "Farewell, Girls", and concluded 22 episodes later with "Light" on March 13, 2007. The first DVD was released in September 2007.

== Episode listing ==
| No. | Title | Original release date |
|---|---|---|
| 1 | "Farewell, Girls"; Transliteration: "Sayonara shōjo-tachi" (Japanese: さよなら少女たち) | October 3, 2006 |
Kate, Rose, Rachel, and Claire are four New York girls who cannot recall what events transpired the previous night. While at school news spread to the student board that the NYPD found Lise's, a close friend, body left at Central Park. As the night falls, the four girls are each led by unusual butterflies to the same place and are unexpectedly approached by a woman wearing a black suit. She asks them if they can remember the previous night when all of them died.
| 2 | "A Harsh Night"; Transliteration: "Zankoku na yoru" (Japanese: 残酷な夜) | October 10, 2006 |
The four girls are attacked by a man who behaves like a rabid dog. The horror ends when the stranger is run over by a bus soon after Rachel displays a supernatural ability to break free from his grasp. Aghast and in shock after the battle, all four are approached by the mysterious woman, who calls herself Lula, and her silent partner JC.
| 3 | "My True Self"; Transliteration: "Hontō no watashi" (Japanese: ほんとうの私) | October 17, 2006 |
Lise's father asks Kate about his daughter's diary and thanks her for being friends with Lise. Later, the four girls attend Lise's funeral and become upset upon finding Lula and JC also there. Lula gives them a red seed and explains to them to plant it if they want to know the truth. They plant the seed which later flowers. Lula also shows them the deaths of four girls who decided to stop fighting the monsters. That night they have a vision of themselves being killed by a man and his uncle in a mansion while searching for Lise who they found dead in a bathtub.
| 4 | "Where Are We Going?"; Transliteration: "Watashi-tachi wa, doko e?" (Japanese: 私たちは, どこへ?) | October 24, 2006 |
Kate is interviewed about Lise by detectives at the school, but gives little information. Kate shares her thoughts about their situation with Rose, and they both decide to visit Rachel and Claire. Rachel disdainfully says there is no point in discussing it or resuming their normal lives since they are already dead. Kate and Rose go to Claire's apartment in a run-down neighborhood, but she is not home. She is searching for the place where they all supposedly died. That night Lula gathers them to kill another beast-man and during the fight, Rachel goes berserk and beats him to a pulp with a baseball bat.
| 5 | "At Every Window"; Transliteration: "Sorezore no mado" (Japanese: それぞれの窓) | October 31, 2006 |
Rachel breaks down after her experience of killing a beast-man the night before. Claire proposes to Kate that they go with Rose to visit investigate the manor where their deaths took place. When asked, Rose collapses in tears with the excuse that her siblings need her to shop for them. Kate and Claire go and investigate the manor but they find the place empty and deserted. Meanwhile Rose takes care of her siblings and Rachel catches up with her friends. All four girls feel under intense pressure and have trouble dealing with their normal lives.
| 6 | "A Tiny Light"; Transliteration: "Chiisa na hikari" (Japanese: 小さな光) | November 7, 2006 |
The four girls are still having problems adjusting to their situation. Hervé goes to visit Dr. Bender to check on the health of both Anna (his sister) and Mireille (his cousin). When the four girls are once again summoned for another fight Rachel refuses and runs away. Kate and the others follow and catch up with her. Lula explains that if even one of them strays from the group during a mission then all will die. However if they are successful, there is a possibility that they can get their lives back.
| 7 | "Destiny, Once Again"; Transliteration: "Mō hitotsu no, unmei" (Japanese: もうひとつの, 運命) | November 14, 2006 |
Hervé recalls his mother's death when he was a child, how she transformed into a rabid beast and had to be destroyed. He again visits Dr. Bender to check on the health of both Anna and Mireille who have the same condition as his mother. Hervé is distressed that they will succumb before a cure is found when Mireille suddenly falls ill. That night he watches disapprovingly as the four girls kill another beast-man.
| 8 | "Go Love"; Transliteration: "Yukite aise" (Japanese: 行きて愛せ) | November 21, 2006 |
A time of relative peace has come, allowing Kate, Rachel, Rose, and Claire to know each other better and coexist together. As they have dinner at Claire's home, Kate comments how fortunate they are for a chance to return to their normal lives. Claire replies that even if their lives are not what they used to be, all of them are friends to each other that spend time and have fun together.
| 9 | "Awakening"; Transliteration: "Mezame" (Japanese: めざめ) | November 28, 2006 |
Kate spies upon Lula and JC but is soon spotted by Lula. Lula explains that Lise's new body was taken by their enemy Dolore to try and lift their family curse. Meanwhile, unable to find a job to pay for the rent, Claire reluctantly goes to her brother to ask him for money. Rose and her siblings visit their hospitalized mother, while Rachel bumps into her school teacher by accident and both have a friendly chat at a cafe.
| 10 | "Bewilderment"; Transliteration: "Tomadoi" (Japanese: 戸惑い) | December 5, 2006 |
Lise wakes up in a clinic room with no memory of the past, and Dr. Bender informs Hervé's grandfather that her bodily functions are in healthy condition. Hervé visits his grandfather and accuses him of forsaking Mireille and Anna's lives, granting medical priority to Lise instead. In daytime, Lula contacts the girls to survey their next target – a seemingly normal businessman. The following night the businessman changes into a beast-man and they have to kill him, but Claire begins to question Lula's motives.
| 11 | "Respective Thoughts"; Transliteration: "Sorezore no omoi" (Japanese: それぞれの想い) | December 12, 2006 |
Emma introduces her fiancé Emilio to her sister Kate. At school, Luke accuses Rachel of having an affair with Nick her teacher, prompting her to break down in tears. Claire reluctantly returns to her former employer at the hamburger shop but finds out that he has missed her. Hervé meets with Emilio, who is also a Dolore clan member, and warns him to break up with his girlfriend because Kate is part of their enemies, Animus. Emilio refuses, but is warned of a backlash from the clan.
| 12 | "His Expectations"; Transliteration: "Kare no omowaku" (Japanese: 彼の思惑) | December 19, 2006 |
Hervé is required to spend time with the resurrected Lise, but is resentful, believing more effort should be made to save Mireille. He tells Emilio that he wants to get closer to Kate in order to understand his enemies and find out who is leading the girls. He persuades Emilio to have Emma bring Kate for a day out with them. Later he walks Kate home alone and invites her out the following Sunday.
| 13 | "Holiday"; Transliteration: "Kyūjitsu" (Japanese: 休日) | January 9, 2007 |
The Animus group are concerned that the detectives are probing into the recent girls' suicides. During a mission, Kate finds hidden abilities within her new body surprising herself and the others. However complications among the girls' teamwork arise when Rose's fear to take part in the fights puts Rachel's life in danger. Later, Rose asks Kate for training to become stronger.
| 14 | "Reason to Fight"; Transliteration: "Tatakau riyū" (Japanese: 戦う理由) | January 16, 2007 |
Emma and Emilio meet with the school principal to discuss Kate's attendance. Later, it's revealed that the principal and her niece Paula are part of the Animus clan and Paula is told to continue to protect Kate. Kate realizes that Hervé lied to her on their previous date about the reason he rushed off. They meet and he tells her the truth, that when he was told that his cousin Mireille fell sick, he panicked. During the next mission Rose suddenly uses her enhanced abilities to save Rachel.
| 15 | "Sorrow and Anger"; Transliteration: "Kanashimi to, ikari to..." (Japanese: 悲しみと, 怒りと...) | January 23, 2007 |
Hervé breaks down after helplessly witnessing Mireille getting slain once she dies and the curse consumes her. He attempts to kill Lise but cannot bring himself to do so. Next morning, Hervé shocks Kate by disclosing that he knows she has been killing all those men. Afterwards, Kate gets interrogated by the police because an anonymous parcel was addressed to them containing Lise's diary.
| 16 | "Painful Lie"; Transliteration: "Kanashii uso" (Japanese: 哀しい嘘) | January 30, 2007 |
Hervé contacts Kate to meet him at the docks that night. The detectives suspect that Vivaleo Pharmaceuticals are somehow involved in the recent girls' suicides. At the requested meeting with Kate, Hervé discloses that she and her friends have been fighting for Animus, and tells her the story of the two cursed tomes which have been fought over for generations. Lula, JC, Lucy and the school principal appear and attack Hervé and Emilio. Hervé kills JC when he tries to protect Lula.
| 17 | "The Truth"; Transliteration: "Shinjitsu" (Japanese: 真実) | February 6, 2007 |
Kate visits Lucy, the school's teacher, to confirm the truth that Hervé disclosed to her, that all four of them will eventually lose all of their memories and live forever in their ageless bodies. Kate then tells Claire, Rachel and Rose. Meanwhile, Hervé is locked up on the orders of his grandfather for his disobedience. He apologizes to Emilio for what's been lost and asks Emilio to let him out.
| 18 | "Slight Hope"; Transliteration: "Wazukana, nozomi" (Japanese: わずかな, 望み) | February 13, 2007 |
The four girls decide not to fight that night and Lula does their job instead. They visit Lise's tomb and chat about how to live their lives in the future. They realize that even if they lose their memories, they will be remembered by family and friends. Hervé kidnaps Lise with Emilio's help and takes her to the seaside where he apologizes to her and leaves. However, Inspector Claude has been following them and finds Lise walking into the water. A group of Dolore men arrive, kill Inspector Claude and then capture Lise.
| 19 | "Feelings That Don't Come Across"; Transliteration: "Todokanai omoi" (Japanese: 届かぬ想い) | February 20, 2007 |
Inspector Neil Kasdan phones Kate and tells her that he saw Lise alive but in the custody of a group of men. As he is following the vehicle transporting Lise across Brooklyn Bridge, it loses control and crashes. When he goes to inspect the crash he is shot and killed by a Dolore man. Hervé finds that Lise has manifested after being injected by Dolore blood and he decides to recover the second book of curses. Meanwhile, Kate does a search on Vivaleo Pharmaceuticals and phones Hervé to demand Lise's return, but the conversation is cut off when a group of Dolore men kidnaps Kate and take her to Dr. Bender.
| 20 | "The Room That's Left Behind"; Transliteration: "Nokosareta heya" (Japanese: 残された部屋) | February 27, 2007 |
Hervé and Emilio infiltrate Dr. Bender's laboratory at Vivaleo Pharmaceuticals to free Kate and Lise. At the same time Lula, Rachel, Rose, and Claire gain access to the building. Emilio frees the two girls. Kate doesn't trust him, but he is stabbed and killed by a Dolore and Kate escapes. Kate finds her friends and they go in search of Lise. Hervé finds Anna, but she is held in custody by his grandfather, Raul. Feeling betrayed, Hervé stabs and kills his grandfather. The event causes Lise to manfest into beast mode. She kills Dr. Bender and escapes. This is witnessed by Lula and the other girls who go after her. Back on Roosevelt Island, Lucy shows the girls the Animus females doomed to eternal life in the school basement.
| 21 | "The Last Morning"; Transliteration: "Saigo no asa" (Japanese: 最後の朝) | March 6, 2007 |
It is Christmas Eve, and each of the girls spend the night in company of their loved ones. As the sun rises in the morning, all four bid their last farewells and gather at the school to prepare for the upcoming battle.
| 22 | "The Light"; Transliteration: "Hikari" (Japanese: 光) | March 13, 2007 |
The bridge connecting Roosevelt Island to the mainland is destroyed by a set of explosions cutting all accesses and killing many Animus women. War erupts among the Animus and Dolore, and casualties mount on both sides. Hervé, with Anna in his arms, breaks into the school grounds. The four girls follow in pursuit but he defeats them and kills Lula who comes to their aid. Badly wounded, he enters the school with the dying Anna, and finds the book. Sadly he has to kill Anna as she manifests her beast form and attacks him. The girls find Lise and join the two books together, releasing the curse and allowing the immortal Animus women to finally die, including Lise. Flowers bloom and cover the island which becomes known as the Red Garden.
