= Lady (Devil May Cry) =

Fictional character in the Devil May Cry

- Devil May Cry character
- Lady as seen in Devil May Cry 5 (2019)
- First game: Devil May Cry 3: Dante's Awakening (2005)
- Created by: Bingo Morihashi
- Designed by: Daigo Ikeno (Devil May Cry 3); Tatsuya Yoshikawa (Devil May Cry 4, Devil May Cry 5)
- Voiced by: English: Kari Wahlgren (Devil May Cry 3 and 4); Melissa Davis (The Animated Series); Kate Higgins (Devil May Cry 4: Special Edition and 5); Scout Taylor-Compton (TV series); Japanese: Fumiko Orikasa
- Motion capture: Stephanie Cheeva (Devil May Cry 3); Laura Napoli (Devil May Cry 4); Agnes Olech (Devil May Cry 5); Andrea Tivadar (face; Devil May Cry 5)

Lady (Japanese: レディ, Hepburn: Redi), born Mary, is a character in Devil May Cry, an action-adventure game series created by Japanese developer and publisher Capcom. She was introduced in the 2005 title Devil May Cry 3: Dante's Awakening, as a demon hunter on a mission to avenge her mother's death at the hands of her father, Arkham. She is also present as a playable character in the sequel Devil May Cry 4: Special Edition (2015). Since her introduction, Lady has appeared in the series' various anime and manga releases, supporting the protagonist Dante, to whom she often provides support and employment.

The character was created by Bingo Morihashi alongside two other designers. She was specifically designed with several traits to distinguish her from other heroines in the franchise. While Lady does not play a major role in Devil May Cry 4 (2008), her design in that game was reworked to be more attractive, since the sequel takes place almost a decade after her introduction, when she was underage. Multiple actors have provided her voice in her numerous appearances, including Kari Wahlgren and Kate Higgins, while Fumiko Orikasa voices the character in Japanese versions of the games.

Critical reception to Lady has been positive. Various gaming publications have liked her role in the overall story of the franchise, and praised her debut as a playable character in Devil May Cry 4: Special Edition due to her unique movements. She has been listed as one of the best heroines in video gaming history, and her addition to the anime spin-off series has also been acclaimed.

== Creation and design ==
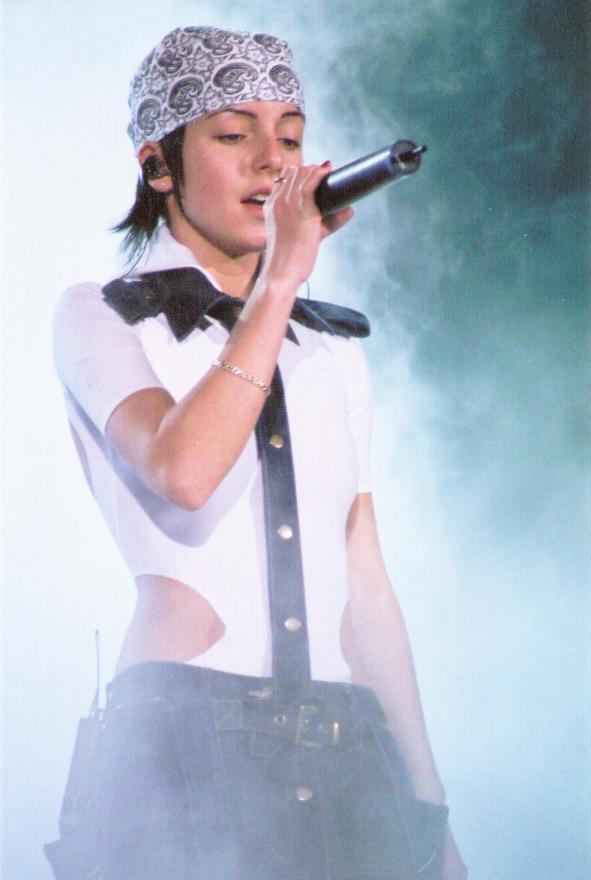
Lady's appearance was based on Julia Volkova, a member of Russian band t.A.T.u.

Lady's appearance was based on Russian singer Julia Volkova. While the character's designers sought to have her portrayed as a capable fighter, she was dressed in a school uniform in order to appeal to casual gamers; Daigo Ikeno tried to off-set the immature outfit by using oversized weaponry. With regard to cutscenes, Ikeno asked staff to make her look like a skilled fighter by utilizing sudden, unexpected martial arts movements and having the character make quick use of her guns during peak stances of those movements; her motion-capture actress found it difficult to replicate these moves. Bingo Morihashi said that he originally intended for Lady to be older than series protagonist Dante, but director Hideaki Itsuno refused to agree to this, believing Japanese players would prefer the character younger. Her appearance was finalized late in Devil May Cry 3's development, though Morihashi wrote her story and dialogue with a clear visual in mind. To distinguish her from previous heroines in the franchise, Lady was given black hair. Another contrast with Trish and Lucia was the fact she was highly skilled at fighting demons. The team felt former heroines were too generic.

Her relationship with her father Arkham represents one of the key themes of Devil May Cry 3: familial conflict, with Dante also being in conflict with his brother Vergil. Itsuno said he did not like the idea of Lady killing Arkham, as he believed a child should never kill their parent. Morihashi wanted this scene in the final product, along with Dante defeating Vergil, as themes of the game. To balance this, Morihashi wrote a scene leading up to Arkham's death, where Lady said that Arkham was her responsibility.

For Devil May Cry 4, Lady was redesigned to look like a businesswoman. The main character designer added sunglasses to hide her eyes of different colors, while expanding on her sex appeal to make players notice she was older than in Devil May Cry 3. This sex appeal required adjusting cutscenes in the game. However, multiple ideas were rejected by staff on the grounds that they were too explicit, although her final model was still approved despite being more erotic. Although Lady only appeared in a few cutscenes in the game, the staff had multiple discussions about her redesign; one concept artist said he spent more time designing Lady than Kyrie, the main heroine of the game. Like Dante, Lady's age was kept ambiguous, though the designers wanted both characters to look more attractive than in previous titles.

Lady's popularity once made Capcom staff think about designing a spin-off game centered around her, but this was not pursued. Originally, the character was set to be included as an alternate skin in Devil May Cry 4: Special Edition, but Itsuno feared a negative backlash, and decided to retain her original moves and instead make Lady a playable character. To accommodate her inclusion, certain bosses were redesigned on her campaign mode. In 2015, Itsuno referred to Lady as his favorite character from Devil May Cry 4: Special Edition, based on how different her play style is when compared to the others. Itsuno further described her as "definitely [a] cool enough and strong enough character."

== Appearances ==
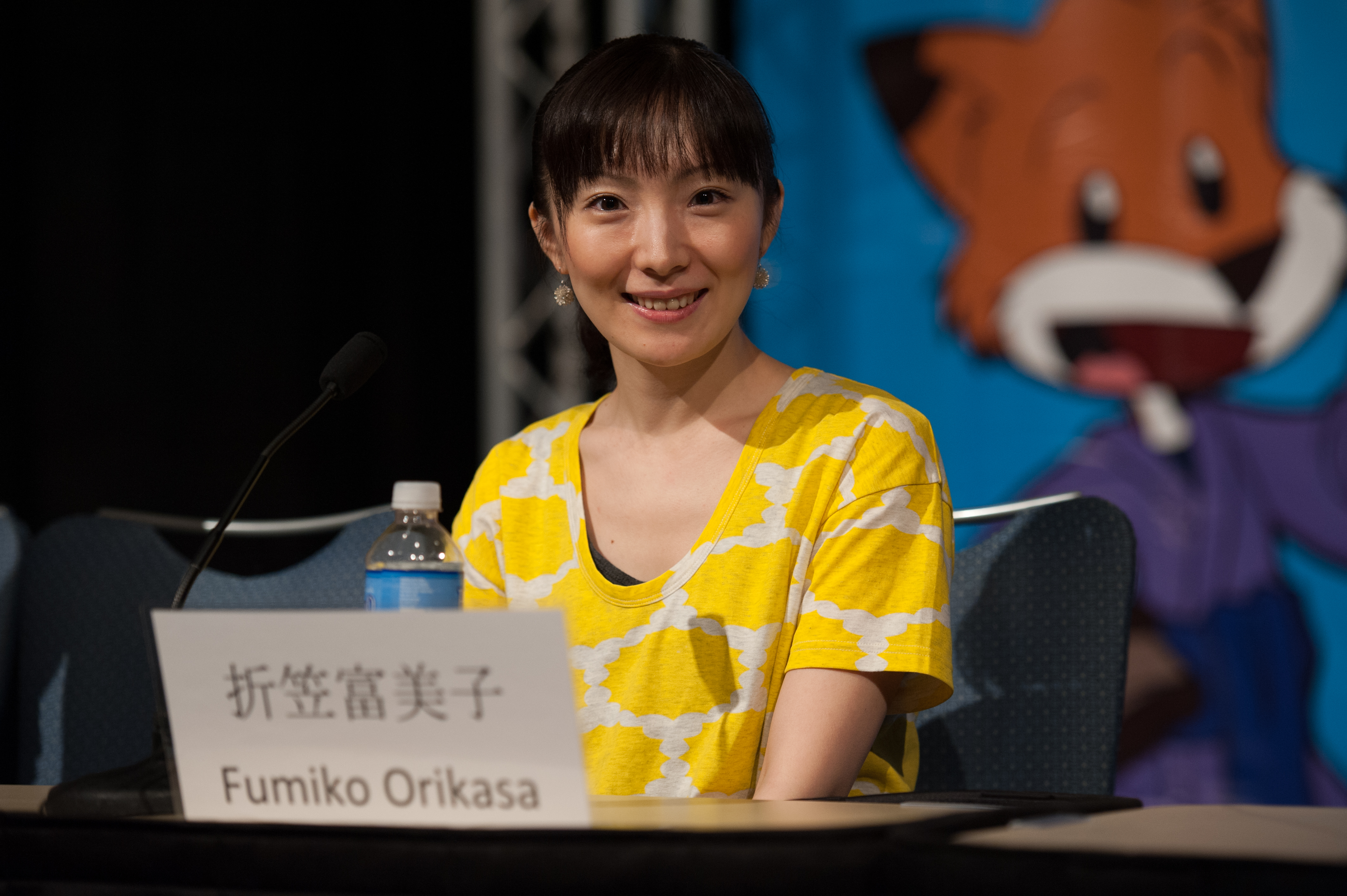
Fumiko Orikasa voices Lady in Japanese.

Lady is a freelance demon hunter, who is highly skilled in acrobatics and armed close quarters combat. She also has a signature weapon: the Kalina-Ann, a customized missile launcher similar to MANPADS. She was born Mary, later renouncing that name after her father Arkham murdered her mother in a ritual to obtain demonic power, an act which drove Mary to psychosis and obsessive vengeance. She first appears in Devil May Cry 3 as an antagonist to Dante, who eventually assumes her mission to stop her father's plans to destroy the world, and decides to take her place upon finding her exhausted. When Lady refuses to identify herself to Dante, he replies, "Whatever, lady!" After Dante and his brother defeat Arkham, Lady formalizes her name in the game's denouement, telling her father that "Mary" is dead, before shooting him. At the end of the game, it is revealed that it was she who coined the phrase "Devil May Cry". She said it while trying to console Dante over the loss of his brother. Dante then used it as the name for his shop.

She appears in Devil May Cry: The Animated Series as a solo demon hunter who sometimes calls on Dante for help. She has a cameo appearance in Devil May Cry 4, asking Dante and Trish for help in defeating the Order of the Sword, which has been creating their own weapons: Devil Arms. In the epilogue, she gives only a small amount of money to the duo as reward for dismantling the organization, while blaming them for generating chaos on the mission. In a special edition of the fourth game, she and Trish replaces Nero and Dante respectively in their own episode, whereas Lady's gameplay heavily focus on her firearms. She is also present in Devil May Cry 5 but unplayable. In the game's story, Lady, Trish and Dante are defeated by the Demon King Urizen and she is placed inside the demon Artemis until Nero rescues her.

In the Devil May Cry 3 manga, Lady makes a brief appearance a year before the events of the game. She also appears as an assistance character in Project X Zone. Her design from Devil May Cry 4 also appears in the game Monster Hunter Frontier G. In the musical Devil May Cry: The Live Hacker, Lady was portrayed by Naomi Majima. Outside Devil May Cry, Lady has also appeared in Onimusha Soul.

Kari Wahlgren voiced Lady in Devil May Cry 3 and Devil May Cry 4, with Kate Higgins taking over the role since Devil May Cry 4: Special Edition. Stephanie Cheeva provided Lady's motion capture in Devil May Cry 3; Laura Napoli did so in Devil May Cry 4. Melissa Davis voiced her in the English version of The Animated Series. Fumiko Orikasa voiced Lady in The Animated Series, Special Edition of the fourth game, Devil May Cry 5, and Project X Zone. Capcom staff praised Orikasa, who said her work in the anime was challenging and Lady's appeal comes from her cool fighting appearance and her dynamic with Lady during their fight. Orikasa describes Lady as coldhearted but still enjoyed her role in the series.

== Reception ==
Critical response to Lady has been positive. GamesRadar praised her role in Devil May Cry 3, highlighting how she stood out from the rest of the cast, and how she clashes with both Dante and Vergil. Similarly, Engadget commended the execution and handling of her plot on Devil May Cry 3, and how Dante ends up helping Lady to get revenge on her father. GameSpy shared similar feelings, stating that Lady and the rest of the cast were better written than the characters from the first two Devil May Cry games. Complex additionally found her a more likable sidekick to Dante than Trish based on her backstory and fighting style. Rappler said that Lady surprisingly stands out in Devil May Cry 3 as the protagonist Dante is quite an entertaining protagonist and especially because Lady does not share demon genes that give her the power to be as powerful as other characters. Her revenge driven story and relationship with Dante was also praised by the writer from the website.

IGN listed her as the seventh best gaming heroine due to her characterization and the impact her actions have had on the overall franchise. GamesRadar also noted the impact Lady made to Devil May Cry series, by coming up with the franchise's title during her first appearance. The same site also described 'Lady' as being one of the worst character names in gaming. PortalPlay Game listed her as the third most sexually appealing character in gaming. Before the release of Marvel vs. Capcom 3: Fate of Two Worlds, Play listed Lady as a character they wanted to see in the cast, believing Capcom "underused" her.

Despite enjoying Lady's redesign in Devil May Cry 4, GamesTM was disappointed by the brevity of her appearance in the game. In their review of Special Edition, Hobby Consolas praised Lady's fighting style, although they noted it was the most difficult to master of any character in the game. Destructoid said she was a unique character in the game, because she is human who does not possess any demonic powers like the rest of the cast, which made mastering her fighting style entertaining. PC Magazine expressed a similar sentiment, based on how her skills contrast to those of the rest of the playable characters. While also finding her enjoyable to play, IGN believed that Vergil's mechanics made him more appealing and overshadowed both Trish and Lady. Game Informer was afraid Lady would "feel too gimmicky", but ended up liking her dynamic style.

While reviewing the anime series, DVDTalk said they liked the interactions between Dante, Lady and Trish, to the point where the reviewer expected to see more of these, rather than stories focused on Dante fighting different enemies. GroundReport felt Lady and Trish were foils to Dante and compared them to the main characters from the manga and anime series GetBackers, due to the financial issues Dante faces despite him often receiving jobs from Lady. Fandom Post appreciated her addition to the cast; they liked the variety her character brought to the anime, as well as how she stands out in an episode fighting Trish over a misunderstanding where they end up becoming friends. The writer also enjoyed her role in following episodes, most notably the finale. Anime News Network lamented the fact that Lady only makes brief appearances in the anime, but said they found her English voice acting charming. UK Anime Network also liked her role in the anime, praising the way her fights are displayed. Hyper had mixed thoughts about the episode where Lady meets Trish through a fight but compared the style of the two female characters to the franchise The Matrix because of how stylish they both are.

io9 criticized the depiction of Lady in Netflix's series, but praised voice actress Scout Taylor-Compton for her performance and wrote "There's a lot to love about Lady, which is why its so disappointing to witness any sense of poignancy of her quieter contemplative moments or badassery being upended by her cursing so god damn often." Screen Rant agreed due to her more aggressive portrayal when compared to the games' take especially with the multiple swearings she makes in her screentime. Evie Rivas of In Between Drafts labelled Mary as the greatest issue with the adaptation, criticizing her excessive narrative importance and unlikability and describing her as "a theocratic Nazi that eventually builds a concentration camp" though noted that Scout Taylor-Compton's acting was not at fault. Vamsi Krishna of FandomWire believed the Netflix incarnation was "the true villain of Netflix’s Devil May Cry", stating that the changes to her "damaged her character beyond redemption" and that "It’s as if Netflix was on a speedrun to see how fast they can make a character irredeemable".
