= Melissa Davis =

American voice actress

Melissa Davis is an American voice actress known for her voice-over work in English-language dubs of Japanese anime. Her major roles include Kate Ashley in Red Garden, Shiina in Angel Beats!, and Mai Kawasumi in Kanon.

== Voice roles ==
- Angel Beats! - Shiina
- Appleseed: Ex Machina - Yoshino
- Broken Blade - General Sakura (Movie 2), Nike
- Clannad - Botan, Girl from Illusionary World (Ushio Okazaki)
- Demon King Daimao - Kena Soga
- Devil May Cry - Lady
- Dream Eater Merry - Chizuru Kawanami
- Ghost Hound - Chika Nakajima, Yoshimi Iwasaki
- Gilgamesh - Cinque
- Guyver: The Bioboosted Armor - Additional Voices
- The Guin Saga - Flori
- Halo Legends - Han (The Duel)
- ICE - Kisaragi
- Kanon - Mai Kawasumi
- Kiba - Elmeida
- Le Chevalier D'Eon - Queen Mary Charlotte
- Loups=Garous - Hazuki Makino
- Mythical Detective Loki Ragnarok - Skuld
- Night Raid 1931 - Ai-Ling (Ep. 5)
- Pani Poni Dash! - Kurumi Momose
- Red Garden - Kate Ashley
- Samurai Girls - Ginsen Yagyuu (as Teresa Krowd)
- Shattered Angels - Additional Voices
- Starship Troopers: Invasion - Ice Blonde
- The World God Only Knows - Sora Asuka
- Tokyo Majin - Maiko Takamizawa
- Un-Go - Sayo Izawa (Ep. 7-8)
