= List of Persona 4 characters =

Playable characters of Persona 4, backed by their Personas. From left to right; Teddie, Rise, Yosuke, Naoto, Kanji, Yu, Chie, and Yukiko.

The plot of Atlus's 2008 role-playing video game Persona 4 is centered on a group of high-school students dedicated to capturing the culprit responsible for the murders and kidnappings that happened in their small town of Inaba starting on April 11, 2011. The case is linked by the TV world, a dimension where the characters use alter-egos known as "Personas" to defeat the Shadows, beings that represent people's hidden thoughts that killed the first two victims. The protagonist is Yu Narukami, a high-school student who moved into the town from the city. He is met by Yosuke Hanamura, the son of the local department store manager; Chie Satonaka, an energetic girl with a strong interest in kung fu; Yukiko Amagi, a calm and refined girl whose family owns the local inn; Kanji Tatsumi, a first-year student whose punk reputation hides a softer side; Teddie, a mysterious figure from the TV world who exists in the form of a cartoonish bear costume; Rise Kujikawa, a popular teen idol who has taken a break from showbiz; and Naoto Shirogane, a well-known junior detective.

Persona 4 has been adapted to a manga and an anime series that gave different portrayals to the game's cast, most notably the protagonist who is given his own name and a personality. The game was also ported for the PlayStation Vita and PC as Persona 4 Golden which expanded various of the characters' stories and included a new one called Marie, a teenage girl linked with the Investigation Team. A fighting game sequel, Persona 4 Arena, features the Investigation Team in a tournament competing against each other as well as characters from the previous game in the series, Persona 3.

Shigenori Soejima acted as the art director for the game and was responsible for the character design. The general approach to designing the characters and ultimately the setting of the game was by drawing from the memory and interpretation of the development staff about a "rural, countryside" setting. Reception of the game's characters are mostly positive, with various characters having been reviewed favorably. This included the characters' realistic personalities and the relationships established across the game. The English voice acting work was also met with a similar response.

== Creation and design ==
Shigenori Soejima was in charge of designing the characters in Persona 4. With the series now taking place in a fictional rural town rather than a city like in the prequels, the characters with origins from the city had hair styles different from those in Inaba with 1UP.com commenting that Yu's and Yosuke's were more stylish. The non-player characters with whom the player forms Social Links, a game mechanic wherein the player fosters friendships with the characters to unlock more powerful Personas, had no models in their creation, but Soejima had vague memories about their actions based on his experience when first hearing the ideas. However, as a result of adding the mystery element in the game, the staff decided to make the characters act like real people. Therefore, none of them acted in a stereotypical fashion with director Katsura Hashino stating that this was since "the worldview was already pretty far from the ordinary."

Each player character's "Shadows Selves" are meant to act out-of-character in their first scene as a result of appearing in the Midnight Channel. While in this state, the Shadows entertained the audience watching the program; when the player encounters the real person with their respective Shadow Self, they behave more coherently. This resulted in the portrayal of one of the more popular character's shadow, Kanji's, to behave in a stereotypically gay manner. At the same time, it also revealed more about his person as a whole. No changes were made to these scenes as they were meant to "depict the contrast between what people appear to be and how they really are."

== Investigation Team members ==
The playable characters are part of the investigation team in charge of finding and solving the case of murders and kidnappings happening in Inaba. Upon entering a dimension labeled as the "TV world", they search for the victims and use their Personas to defeat possible enemies. Towards the end of the game, the Investigation Team is re-identified as "The Seekers of Truth" (真実を追う仲間達, Shinjitsu o Ou Nakamatachi; literally "The Friends Chasing the Truth") when they seek out the reasons behind the murders and kidnappings.

=== Yu Narukami ===
Voiced by:

English: Johnny Yong Bosch (2008-2020), Nazeeh Tarsha (Revival)
Japanese: Daisuke Namikawa

The protagonist is the main player-controlled character of Persona 4. In the anime and most other materials, his name is Yu Narukami (鳴上 悠, Narukami Yū), while the manga named him Sōji Seta (瀬多 総司, Seta Sōji). However, in both the original game and the Persona 4 Golden remaster, as well as in Persona Q: Shadow of the Labyrinth, the player can choose any desired name for the character.

He is a high school student who moves to the countryside of Inaba to live with his uncle Ryotaro Dojima and cousin Nanako Dojima for a year as a result of his parents working abroad, and attends Yasogami High School where he meets most of the game's cast. Before reaching Inaba, however, he is summoned to the Velvet Room by Igor and his assistant Margaret, who warn him of an imminent catastrophe that is about to arrive in his destiny, and that he will have to solve a great mystery within that year, or, otherwise, his fate would have been marked in negative. Yu has no spoken dialogue in the game following the tradition of the Megami Tensei games, his only speech occurring during battle.

The Protagonist owns the Arcana of The Fool, the same one shared by his initial Persona Izanagi (イザナギ) and the Wild Card (which allows him to be able to utilize more than one Persona), but during the battle against Izanami he receives, from the union of the strong bonds he has created, the Arcana of "The World" that allows the evolution of its original Persona, Izanagi, into Izanagi-no-Okami. His entire personality is decided and portrayed by the player's in-game actions and decisions. As a result, Soejima designed him to look more ambiguous than the Protagonist in Persona 3. His character design stayed relatively similar to the initial conception, with his tone and expressions changing the most. In order to emphasize his being from a city, Yu was given a distinct stylish haircut to contrast Inaba's citizens.

=== Yosuke Hanamura ===
Voiced by:

English: Yuri Lowenthal (2008-2018), Paul Castro Jr. (Revival)
Japanese: Showtaro Morikubo

Yosuke Hanamura (花村 陽介, Hanamura Yōsuke) is a teenager who moved to Inaba a year before Yu and whose father is the manager of Inaba's Junes Department Store. In order to emphasize his origins from the city Shigenori Soejima gave him accessories such as headphones and a bicycle as well as a stylish haircut. Little changes were made to his design in the making of the game. Befriending Yu shortly after the game's beginning, Yosuke is shocked to find that his friend Saki Konishi becomes the second victim from Inaba's murders. Noticing clues between the victims and the Midnight Channel, Yosuke and Yu go to the TV world to investigate her death. He ends up confronting his Shadow who represents his resentment of living in a small country town with little to do, as well as his inner wish for something exciting to happen. With help from Yu and Teddie, Yosuke accepts his other self and forms the Investigation Team alongside him to figure out who Saki's killer is.

Yosuke's Shadow becomes the Persona Jiraiya (ジライヤ), a red-scarved humanoid whose head vaguely resembles that of a cartoon ninja frog decked with shuriken on his hands, as well as bell-bottoms. As the first Shadow, Soejima designed it to make it similar to Jiraiya to convey the fact that Shadows and Personas are the same thing. Yosuke dual wields blades ranging from blunt wrenches to knives to kunai in battle. Throughout the player's interaction with Yosuke, he overcomes Saki's death and confronts his feelings about Inaba accepting it as an enjoyable town despite his initial feelings. After this, Jiraiya evolves into Susano-o (スサノオ), a humanoid wearing a blue jumpsuit surrounded by a large sawblade with a flame rising from his head. Apparently, unused audio suggests that Yosuke could have been a romance option for the protagonist, but was removed at the last minute for unknown reasons. In the re-release Persona 4 Golden, Yosuke's Persona can evolve once more into Takehaya Susano-o (タケハヤスサノオ), gaining a fireman's outfit, a large afro-like fireball spouting from his head, and sawblades beneath his feet.

Yosuke serves as the player's Social Link to The Magician; in the animated series, Yu's friendship with Yosuke is signified by Yu's use of Pyro Jack (ジャックランタン, Jakkurantan).

During the events of Persona 4 Arena, Yosuke is now a third-year student at Yasogami High School and he begins to hear rumors that the Midnight Channel is back. He goes to investigate alongside Yu, Yukiko and Chie, and fights using Jiraiya. He also serves as the main character of the manga Persona 4 The Magician that focuses on his life in Inaba before the game's start.

Yuri Lowenthal enjoyed playing Yosuke owing to the large number of events the character goes through despite being initially a comic relief.

Takahisa Maeyama portrays Yosuke in the stage play.

=== Chie Satonaka ===
Voiced by:

English: Tracey Rooney (Persona 4), Erin Fitzgerald (2012-2018), Anne Yatco (Revival)
Japanese: Yui Horie

Chie Satonaka (里中 千枝, Satonaka Chie) is an upbeat girl with an obsession with kung fu, even using those techniques in battle. Although initially reluctant, she goes into the TV world when her best friend Yukiko Amagi is thrown in, putting her in danger. There, Chie encounters her Shadow who represents her jealousy of Yukiko's feminine side and talents, as well as her wish and need to maintain control over Yukiko. With Yu's and Yosuke Hanamura's help, Chie confronts her other self and joins the Investigation Team.

Following the encounter with her Shadow, Chie receives the Persona Tomoe Gozen (トモエ, Tomoe), a muscular female figure wearing a yellow outfit and armed with a naginata, that she uses in combat while she performs kicks. Throughout Yu's interactions with Chie (which can also be intimate), she discovers that she genuinely wanted to protect Yukiko without any underlying selfish motivations. After this, Tomoe evolves into Suzuka Gongen (スズカゴンゲン), whose yellow jumpsuit turns black and is decked in silver samurai armor. The desire to protect people eventually inspires her to seek a career as a police officer. In the re-release Persona 4 Golden, Chie's Persona can evolve to a third level to become Haraedo-no-Okami (ハラエドノオオカミ, Haraedo-no-Ōkami), which has golden armor and a long flowing cape.

Chie serves as the player's Social Link to The Chariot; this is symbolized in the animated series by Yu's usage of the Persona Ara Mitama (アラミタマ).

She is playable in Persona 4 Arena alongside Tomoe Gozen; In Persona 4 Arena, Chie joins Yu, Yosuke and Yukiko to investigate the TV world after seeing the Midnight Channel. When she enters, she is forced to fight her friends as well as a man, Akihiko Sanada.

Minami Tsukui portrays her in the stage play.

In the designing of the character, various sketches were made with some of them being reminiscent to previous Persona characters.

=== Yukiko Amagi ===
Voiced by:

English: Amanda Winn-Lee (2008-2018), Brianna Knickerbocker (Revival)
Japanese: Ami Koshimizu

Yukiko Amagi (天城 雪子, Amagi Yukiko) is an elegant, introverted girl, popular within her school. Her family owns a famous ryokan in the city, and Yukiko is always busy preparing herself to take over the business. She is named the next owner of the ryokan and feels oppressed by her expected duties. Despite her elegant appearance, she carries a whimsical side prone to fits of laughter. Yukiko becomes the third victim to be sent to the TV world, where she is confronted by her Shadow who represents her resentment towards having her destiny already chosen for her as inheritor of the Amagi Inn and her desire to be rescued.

With help from the Investigation Team, Yukiko accepts her Shadow which becomes the Persona Konohana Sakuya (コノハナサクヤ), a pink-colored humanoid with sakura-like wings using a fan as her weapon. She joins the group to find the culprit behind the kidnappings and murders, and befriends Yu, with the option of starting a romantic relationship with him (depending on the player's actions). Yukiko voices her wish to the protagonist to leave Inaba and find a career away from managing her family inn. She eventually changes her mind when she realizes she cannot find the heart to leave the family and employees who supported her. Following such understanding, Konohana-Sakuya evolves into Amaterasu (アマテラス), a feminine, faceless figure with yellow skin and metallic chrysanthemum-like wings. In Persona 4 Golden, Yukiko's Persona can change once more to become Sume-Omikami (スメオオミカミ, Sume-ōmikami), with golden wings, more ornate shields, and long flowing hair.

Something that hinders Yukiko's preparations to take over the Amagi Inn is her cooking, which has the effect of turning stomachs: her colleagues in the Investigation Team call this "Mystery Food X". Chie and Rise are also bad cooks: this is something that distresses Shinjiro Aragaki in Persona Q: Shadow of the Labyrinth.

Yukiko represents the player's Social Link to The Priestess. In the animated series, her friendship with Yu is symbolized by Yu's access to the Persona High Pixie (ハイピクシー, Hai Pikushī).

She also appears in Persona 4 Arena with Konohana-Sakuya. In the game's story mode, Yukiko has become a far more accomplished chef than she was previously, and when she learns that the Midnight Channel has returned, she investigates it alongside her friends. In the making of the character, various designs were made, some of them being drastically different from how Yukiko looks in the game. A younger Yukiko makes an appearance in Persona 3 Portable at the Amagi Inn, when the game's playable characters take a field trip to Inaba.

Yukiko is portrayed by Risa Yoshiki in the first stage play and Yumi Sugimoto in the second.

=== Kanji Tatsumi ===
Voiced by:

English: Troy Baker (2008-2012), Matthew Mercer (2012-2018), Daman Mills (Revival)
Japanese: Tomokazu Seki

Kanji Tatsumi (巽 完二, Tatsumi Kanji) is a fifteen-year-old student in the first year of Yasogami High. He is a delinquent who has a reputation as being a bully, and is the center of numerous rumors regarding a confrontation with a local biker gang. As a result, he was initially given the "classic gang-style pompadour" in the making of his design. The fourth victim to be sent to the TV world, Kanji is revealed to have a complex with his Shadow revealing he hates girls as a result of criticizing his sewing and is more interested in boys. After the protagonist's group comes to save Kanji, he accepts that his Shadow is an important part of his identity, causing it to transform into the Persona Take-Mikazuchi (タケミカズチ, Takemikazuchi) an enormous black robotic humanoid with the design of a skeleton all over his body, and armed with a large bolt shaped like a lightning bolt and will use a metallic chair as his weapon. He, eager to discover the one who kidnapped him, later joins the Investigation Team, and will begin to express more openly his sensitive side to others, and he will also show that he is rather naive and airy, and not a few times will struggle to follow the team's reasoning on the cases; however in the hardest moments he will lift up and spur others, before they can give in and be overcome by difficulties. During his Social Link, he will increasingly confide with the Protagonist and demonstrate the fragile traits of his personality, his desire to go beyond the label which he is branded by other people, and his passion in creating small plushies; in particular he will start making them for a child who will ask him for help because he has lost the doll of a school friend of his. The gratitude that the child manifests for his gesture leads him to sell his puppets in his mother's fabric store. Reached the highest level of his Social Link, Kanji confesses that his father, before dying, had told him that he had to be strong to be a real man, and that was the reason he always acted in a rude and violent manner; in the end, however, he realized that it was not what his father meant, and that to be strong, he must stop lying to himself and act according to his true personality, without fearing the judgment of others. In this way, his Persona evolves and becomes Rokuten Maou (ロクテンマオウ, Rokuten Maō), a red robotic humanoid, with a flame design all over his body and a pair of long and pointed mustaches, armed with a large sword that resembles fire. In Persona 4 Golden, Kanji's Persona can once again change into Takeji Zaiten (タケジザイテン), white in color and more robust than the previous forms. His sexual orientation remains ambiguous across the series, with Kanji being first interested in Naoto Shirogane when first meeting her, believing her to be a boy, but is still attracted to her when it is revealed that she is a girl. Atlus prefers to leave the issue of Kanji's sexuality as open to the viewer. Atlus senior project manager Masaru Nanba remarked on how popular the interpretation of Kanji and his Shadow were in the west in an interview with Famitsu in 2013.

Kanji's Social Link is represented by The Emperor; in the animated series, his friendship with Yu is symbolized by the Persona King Frost (キングフロスト Kingu Furosuto).

Youichirou Oomi portrays him in the stage play.

=== Rise Kujikawa ===
Voiced by:

English: Laura Bailey (2008-2014), Ashly Burch (Dancing All Night), Abby Trott (Revival)
Japanese: Rie Kugimiya

Rise Kujikawa (久慈川 りせ, Kujikawa Rise) is a cheerful girl and one of the most popular idols in Japan known as "Risette" ("Risechie" (りせちー, Risechī) in Japanese). Supposedly, she had even performed in Iwatodai (the setting of Persona 3) two years in the past, though a blackout implied to be caused by the Arcana Hermit boss ruined that particular concert. However, she quits her job and moves to Inaba to live with her grandmother, tired of the spotlight. Shortly after arriving to Inaba, Rise is kidnapped and taken to the TV world, where her other self is manifested. Rise's Shadow represents her anger at being stereotyped as an airheaded popstar, represented as a sex symbol. When the protagonist and his friends come to rescue her, Rise accepts her Shadow as part of herself, stating she does not have a real self. Immediately after, she gains the Persona Himiko (ヒミコ), a black humanoid in a white dress with a satellite dish in place of a head, which she uses to help the Investigation Team to stop Teddie's Shadow. In an interview, Atlus's Masaru Nanba noted that "Risechie" would not translate well into roman letters for the west, and that the French-sounding "Risette" was chosen instead. This also changed her catchphrase from "Rise-Cheese" (りせチーズ, Risechīzu) to "Push Risette" (as in "push the reset button").

Recovering from her experience in the TV world, Rise joins the Investigation Team to track the culprit behind the murders in the town, taking Teddie's spot in fights, analyzing enemies and advising her comrades. During Yu's interactions with Rise, she is initially happy for leaving behind the title Risette. However, numerous reminders of her time in the spotlight, a new replacement idol and a letter from her biggest fan, make her regret her departure. Depending on the player's actions, Rise may end having an intimate relationship with Yu. Realizing that Risette is also part of her true identity, she voices her plans to return to her idol job by spring. Following this, Himiko evolves into Kanzeon (カンゼオン), a white humanoid with a more complex satellite dish than Himiko. In Persona 4 Golden, Rise's Persona can evolve once more into Kouzeon (コウゼオン, Kōzeon), gaining a head resembling a telescope instead of a satellite, two more pairs of arms, and green skin. In Golden, Rise also takes more of an active part in battle, enabling her to directly support the party by giving powerful buffs or picking up fallen fighters.

Rise is the player's Social Link to The Lovers; in the animated series, her friendship with Yu is symbolized by his Persona Leanan Sidhe (リャナンシー, Ryanan Shī). She is also shown to have a not-so-subtle crush on the protagonist and flirts with him consistently, regardless of social standing.

She appears in Persona 4 Arena as a commentator, with an impostor teasing the main characters across the story. She becomes a playable character in the console version of Persona 4 Arena Ultimax using a microphone as her weapon; during these events, her support Persona - Himiko - was transformed for combat during her confrontation with Elizabeth as a result of Rise's resolve to be able to fight on her own.

Yuriya Suzuki from Cheeky Parade portrays her in the stage production.

=== Teddie ===
Voiced by:

English: Dave Wittenberg (Persona 4), Sam Riegel (2012-2021), Laila Berzins (Revival)
Japanese: Kappei Yamaguchi

Teddie (クマ, Kuma; lit. 'Bear') is a strange part-clown, part-bear-like creature, who resides inside the TV world. Learning that somebody has been throwing people in the TV world to kill them, thus causing mayhem, Teddie makes a promise with Yu Narukami and Yosuke Hanamura to find the culprit. Teddie helps the Investigation Team by giving them advice about how to defeat Shadows or track the people who were thrown into the world. As he interacts with the characters, Teddie starts questioning his own existence and grows curious of mankind's habits such as dating girls. In the game Teddie also starts making puns referencing his name. The translation of these jokes to the English version was noted to be difficult by the Atlus staff. In a 2013 interview, Atlus's senior project manager Masaru Nanba stated that the change of "Kuma" to "Teddie" in the western localizations was a result of the familiarity of the concept of the teddy bear to American and European players, and specifically noted the change of Kuma's verbal tic of adding his name to the end of sentences to the "very" to "beary" change in the English translation.

When fighting Rise Kujikawa's Shadow, Teddie seemingly sacrifices himself to save his friends, defeating the Shadow but becoming flattened in the process. After Rise accepts her other self, saying that there is "no real me", Teddie has an existential crisis; this causes his Shadow Self to manifest, representing Teddie's fear that his existence is superficial and "hollow". Aided by his friends, Teddie accepts his doubts regarding his existence and his Shadow turns into the Persona Kintoki-Douji (キントキドウジ, Kintoki-Dōji), a robotic figure that resembles a rotund red boiler with stubby arms and legs and armed with a tomahawk missile as a pun to the original mythological figure. Afterward, through restoring his body through extensive training, Teddie "grows" a human-like body inside of him and leaves the TV world. Using his bear suit, Teddie starts working in Junes and living with Yosuke. He also becomes an active member in battle utilizing a claw as his weapon, with Rise taking his place for support.

When Yu's cousin, Nanako Dojima, dies after being sent to the TV world, Teddie disappears from the real world. As the group searches for him, Teddie remembers that he was actually a Shadow, one who wanted humans to like him and, as a result, erased his memory and took the form of a cartoonish bear. After Nanako revives, Yu finds Teddie in the Velvet Room, where Teddie reveals his origin as a Shadow and Yu informs him of Nanako's revival. After returning to reality and seeing Nanako, Teddie decides he will stay with the Investigation Team once again despite being a Shadow with Kintoki evolving into Kamui (カムイ), a cartoonish face on a ball with clawed hands at the end of a missile. Following Izanami's defeat and the TV world returning to its original state, Teddie decides he will return to the TV world. In Persona 4 Golden, Teddie gains a new Persona called Kamui Moshiri (カムイモシリ), which is a stream-lined missile wearing a crown and a long, flowing, star-patterned cape and a rose emblem.

Teddie is the player's Social Link to The Star; in the animated series, his friendship with Yu is symbolized by the Persona Saturnus (サトゥルヌス, Saturunusu) in Yu's employ.

In the sequel Persona 4 Arena and it's followup, Ultimax, Teddie is impersonated by General Teddie as the organizer of "P-1 Grand Prix" in the TV world, a tournament between Persona-users, while the real one is trapped inside the TV world and seeks to find his friends during the first tournament. Though Teddie had a peaceful day after saving Aigis' sister unit, Labrys during the "Grand Prix", Teddie was in a middle of working at Junes tonight, only to find out that Inaba is filled with a similar occurrence as the TV World known as the Dark Hour, a set up by General Teddie for his grand scheme behind a new last tournament "P-1 Climax". He was encountered by his imposter briefly before reuniting with his friends. In the end when a true plan behind "Climax" is revealed for humanity's destruction, the true identity of General Teddie is also revealed. Teddie is playable alongside Kintoki-Douji.

Early designs of Teddie were to feature him as a more serious-looking character.

Kappei Yamaguchi reprised his role as Teddie in the stage play.

Teddie serves as the basis of a hat available as downloadable content for the Mii Fighters in Super Smash Bros. Ultimate.

=== Naoto Shirogane ===
Voiced by:

English: Anna Graves (2008-2012), Mary Elizabeth McGlynn (The Animation), Valerie Arem (2014-2018), Amber Lee Connors (Revival)
Japanese: Romi Park

Naoto Shirogane (白鐘 直斗, Shirogane Naoto) is a young detective who moves to Inaba in order to aid the police in investigating the serial-murder case. Although Naoto is female, she dresses in a masculine fashion and everyone in Inaba believes her to be a boy. In an attempt to solve the murder case, Naoto uses herself as bait by appearing on TV and allowing herself to be kidnapped by the culprit. The group follows Naoto to the TV world, where Naoto is confronted by her shadow, who expresses her frustration at being treated like a child by the police. Naoto explains after Shadow Naoto has been defeated that because "…the police department is a male-oriented society[, if] they had the slightest "concrete" reason to look down on me, no one would need me anymore," which is why she had been presenting as male. Once Naoto has come to terms with her feelings, her Shadow turns into the Persona Sukuna-Hikona (スクナヒコナ), a robotic humanoid wearing a blue suit jacket that has an insect-like head and butterfly-like wings.

Following Naoto's recovery from her time in the TV world, she joins the Investigation Team to find the culprit, having gained clues about his method thanks to her kidnapping, using a handgun as her weapon. Throughout Yu's interactions with Naoto, she regains her passion for being a detective. Depending on the player's actions, Naoto can become intimate with Yu. Naoto also decides that she isn't a detective just to uphold her family tradition, but because she wants to be and thoroughly enjoy it no matter her gender or age. Her Persona then evolves into Yamato-Takeru (ヤマトタケル), a humanoid in a white and blue traditional armed forces dress uniform with a more bird-like appearance. In the game's ending, Naoto decides to stay in Inaba, unsure what to do now that the case is closed. In Persona 4 Golden, Naoto gets the new Persona Yamato Sumera Mikoto (ヤマトスメラミコト), whose outfit is red and blue, and has long, flowing blonde hair.

Naoto is the character who links the player to Fortune; in the animated series, her friendship with Yu is symbolized by Yu's usage of the Persona Atropos (アトロポス, Atoroposu).

Naoto appears in Persona 4 Arena and its sequel Ultimax along with Sukuna-Hikona. During the story, Naoto investigates Mitsuru Kirijo's group that fights Shadows and follows them to the TV world where they end up becoming involved in the Persona-users fighting tournament twice. Before the occurrence of the second tournament in the day after rescuing Aigis' sister unit, Labrys, Naoto was in a middle of researching relating to Shadow Operatives/S.E.E.S.' involvement histories with Dark Hour and the late-Shuji Ikutsuki at night, but was interrupted by the news from Labrys of Mitsuru's usual team being kidnapped earlier on daylight during their missions, and the second tournament's occurrence turns Inaba into a second Dark Hour area at a same time. Naoto manage to a track a safer landing location for Labrys' new team to land at Inaba before Inaba completely becoming a second Dark Hour area. She had a short encounter with a mysterious culprit named Sho Minazuki (or rather, his half, Minazuki), until Labrys' team arrive on time saving Naoto, then split up to find their missing friends and saving the world from a dangerous outcome planned by Sho and General Teddie. Naoto is also the protagonist of the non-canon light novel Persona X Detective Naoto by Natsuki Mamiya that focuses on one of their works a year after the events of Persona 4 as they investigate the disappearance of one of their childhood friends in Yagakoro City; in this story they awaken a new Persona, Amatsu-Mikaboshi (アマツミカボシ).

Juria Kawakami portrays Naoto in the stage production.

== Antagonists ==
=== Mitsuo Kubo ===
Voiced by:

English: Kyle Hebert (Persona 4, The Animation)
Japanese: Tsuyoshi Takahashi

Mitsuo Kubo (久保 美津雄, Kubo Mitsuo) is a juvenile from Inaba who becomes the second suspect the group believes to be behind the murder case after Kinshiro Morooka's death. He makes a pass at Yukiko Amagi at the beginning of the game, and is rejected. He is later revealed to be an isolated student who was expelled from a different high school prior to the beginning of the game.

Eventually the group manages to find him in the TV World and save him from being killed by his Shadow-self during a heated argument with the Shadow staying quiet. The Shadow takes the form of an unborn fetus that is able to build an 8-bit video game warrior as a barrier, symbolising Mitsuo's immaturity and his use of video games to make himself feel important and powerful. Claiming he was responsible for all murders in Inaba to get people's attention, Mitsuo is taken away by the authorities. Due to the fact the kidnappings do not cease after his capture, the group then comes to the conclusion he was a copycat killer and is in fact mentally unstable. It is later revealed that detective Tohru Adachi is responsible for sending Kubo to the TV world, as Namatame would have stopped sending people into it if he believed that the killer had been caught.

=== Taro Namatame ===
Voiced by:

English: Zach Hanks (Persona 4, Golden); Matthew Mercer (The Animation)
Japanese: Kōji Haramaki

Taro Namatame (生田目 太郎, Namatame Tarō) is a council secretary who is married to popular enka singer Misuzu Hiiragi (柊 みすず, Hiiragi Misuzu), fired from his position as a result of his affair with TV reporter Mayumi Yamano, the first victim of the case. Namatame is later revealed to be responsible for sending people to the TV world, using his family's delivery truck to be unnoticed by the victims and hiding a plasma TV inside for transporting them after knocking them out. When kidnapping Nanako Dojima, Namatame is tracked down by Ryotaro Dojima and forced to escape with Nanako to the TV world. There, the Investigation Team confronts him, when he claims he is instead saving people. His Shadow then absorbs several other Shadows to become Kunino-Sagiri (クニノサギリ), a large, angelic humanoid with a gigantic peace sign-shaped halo growing out of its head. Following Kunino-Sagiri's defeat, Namatame is arrested, but the police are unable to build a case due to lack of evidence.

The player can trap Namatame in the TV world where his Shadow will kill him as the police would not send him to prison for finding him mentally unstable, which automatically ends the game. If Yu convinces his friends to spare him as they need to learn Namatame's true motives. In reality, Namatame had figured out after Mayumi's death that her appearance on the Midnight Channel had foreshadowed her murder, and he sought out Saki Konishi in order to warn her. After she died as well, Namatame tried to contact the police and Tohru Adachi tricked him into throwing people into the TV to "protect" them from the killer; after the victims began to turn up alive after his kidnappings, he believed he was truly helping them. He only realized his terrible mistake when he entered the TV world personally, at which point his mental state fractured. Like Yu and Adachi, he was given the power to enter the TV world by Izanami. During the epilogue of Persona 4 Golden, with Kunino-Sagiri revealed to be a splintered fragment of Izanami, Namatame has been cleared of all charges due to lack of evidence and is running for the position of Mayor of Inaba, inspired by the protagonists' work.

=== Tohru Adachi ===
Voiced by:

English: Johnny Yong Bosch
Japanese: Mitsuaki Madono

Tohru Adachi (足立 透, Adachi Tōru) is a young police officer in the Inaba police department, and Ryotaro Dojima's junior partner. He often accidentally reveals crucial information regarding the investigation to the protagonist, and is constantly reprimanded by Dojima for running his mouth. Following the revelation that Taro Namatame is not the culprit behind the murders and was not aware that the TV world was dangerous until he escaped into it, it is revealed that Adachi is actually behind the two first murders. He became interested in Mayumi Yamano and Saki Konishi until he pushed them into TVs when they spurned his feelings. After the two initial murders, he tricked Namatame into kidnapping people under the idea that he was keeping them from danger, which is reinforced as every person Namatame "rescues" is then saved by the protagonist's group. He manages to evade suspicion until Naoto becomes baffled at a comment he makes at the site of Dojima's accident and the protagonist realizes that he is the only person in Inaba who cannot be ruled out as a suspect, and he accidentally confirms their suspicions by revealing knowledge of specifics that the police were never privy to.

Adachi explains that his reason for his actions is nothing more than to entertain himself and out of disgust for the human world. Adachi uses his handgun in battle. His Persona is Magatsu Izanagi (マガツイザナギ; lit. 'Corrupted Izanagi'), which resembles the protagonist's initial Persona. He is defeated by the party and arrested for his crimes. If the player continues towards the True Ending, the protagonist receives a letter from a recently convicted Adachi, stating his suspicions of a true conductor behind all of the events of the case, providing the investigation team with new insight to their reasoning. It is then revealed he gained his power from Izanami like Yu and Namatame. During the epilogue, Adachi's trial has yet to start but he still gets in contact with Dojima in his cell.

In Persona 4 Golden, Adachi is added as one of the new Social Links the player can build, initially represented by The Jester (道化師, Dōkeshi; "The Pierrot" in Japan); at the game's climax, the player has the option of pursuing Adachi as the main culprit, which changes the Social Link name to The Hunger, or in the Japanese version The Lust (欲望, Yokubō) of the Thoth Tarot, or the player can assist Adachi in destroying evidence and allowing him to escape, maxing out the Jester Arcana and resulting in the new "Accomplice" ending.

Adachi makes a non-playable appearance in the arcade version of Persona 4 Arena Ultimax and was subsequently released as a downloadable content (DLC) character for the initial console versions. During a routine questioning, Sho possesses the detective in charge of Adachi's investigation and uses him to rescue Adachi from prison, throwing him back into the TV world to help him destroy the world by collecting persona fragments and using them to release Hino-Kagutsuchi, a malevolent and powerful avatar of death. He ends up in a Tartarus-esque version of Yasogami High School, meets Yu and company, and pays lip-service to Sho while secretly working to stop his plan.

Adachi eventually makes his move to destroy the crystallized Persona fragment that Sho had captured. He manages to crack the crystal, but is severely beaten by Sho after the latter uses his borrowed power to within an inch of his life until Yu intervenes. Despite being former enemies, Adachi and Yu team up to defeat Sho and Hino-Kagutsuchi, and with the world saved, Adachi returns to his cell and is peacefully visited by his old friend, Ryotaro Dojima.

Adachi is portrayed by Masami Ito in the stage play.

In September 2026, it was revealed that Bosch would return as Adachi, making him the only original cast member to return as their original character. Bosch previously also voiced Yu Narukami until 2020.

=== Ameno-sagiri ===
Voiced by:

Japanese: Ryūsei Nakao (The Animation)

Ameno-sagiri (アメノサギリ), the God of Fog, and the being that was partially influencing Tohru Adachi's actions. Responsible for the fog appearing on rainy days, it takes the form of a gigantic eyeball with a golden disc for an iris and black pipes protruding from its form. It believes itself to pursue "mankind's desires." Ameno-sagiri itself is not malevolent, promising the protagonist that it will lift the fog after being defeated, although it is revealed through its final words that it is not dead, but will remain dormant until enough people wish for the fog to return. In the original Persona 4 it is stated to be Izanami's avatar while in Persona 4 Golden, Ameno-sagiri is retconned to be a splintered fragment of Izanami and his essence was absorbed back into his surviving counterparts upon his death. Ameno-sagiri has no known voice actor in both versions, although he does speak through Adachi when he takes control of him after he is defeated by the group.

=== Izanami ===
Voiced by:

English: Karen Strassman (Persona 4, The Animation)
Japanese: Chizu Yonemoto (The Animation)

Izanami (イザナミ) is the mastermind behind the events of Persona 4. Claiming that it is what humans desire, she aims to cover the world in dense fog and turn mankind into Shadows, which would cause all humans to only see and believe what they wish were true and cease all suffering. Disguising herself as a Moel gas station attendant, she was able to directly grant outsiders like Taro Namatame, Tohru Adachi and Yu Narukami the ability to enter the TV. She also created the entrance to that world as well as the rumor of the Midnight Channel to see how humans would use it.

During the battle, her initial form is that of a goddess, but after she is defeated first time her true form is revealed: a massive, skeletal corpse monster called Izanami-no-Okami (イザナミノオオカミ, Izanami-no-Ōkami). Yu defeats her with the power he developed across the game. Following her defeat, Izanami disappears, satisfied with her opponents' abilities. In Persona 4 Golden, Izanami mentions that she is actually one fourth of the original Izanami: Izanami-no-Mikoto (イザナミノミコト, Izanami-no-Mikoto). The other fragments of her being became Ameno-sagiri, Kunino-sagiri, and Kusumi-no-Okami. With Izanami's death, her essence returns to her sole surviving counterpart Marie.

=== Hino-Kagutsuchi ===
Voiced by:

Japanese: Fumihiko Tachiki

Hino-Kagutsuchi (ヒノカグツチ, Hinokagutsuchi) is an avatar of death and the malevolent mastermind behind the events of the Persona 4 Arena series. Born out of the fog that covered Inaba in Persona 4, Hino-Kagutsuchi is the personification of humanity's collective selfishness. Hino-Kagutsuchi is the one who threw Labrys in a Midnight Channel after tampering with her memories in a bid to lure both the Investigation Team and the Shadow Operatives into the TV world. When that eventually fails, he manipulates Sho Minazuki into collecting Persona fragments, appealing to the boy's memories of abuse under Shuji Ikutsuki and desire to destroy the world, and uses the Minazuki half as his direct vessel.

Hino-Kagutsuchi can assume any other Shadow versions of the Investigation Team and Shadow Operatives, except for those of Adachi, Fuuka, Marie, and the Velvet Room assistants, though his most common disguise in Ultimax is "General Teddie" - a shadow version of Teddie from the main game. In both the main game and the downloadable Adachi chapter, once most of all Persona fragments are collected, Kagutsuchi attempts to kill Yu, but was stopped by Minazuki when he begins to suspect Kagutsuchi's motives. Kagutsuchi possesses Sho's body and kills Minazuki, intending to destroy the world until he is the only one who remains, revealing his true gigantic fiery form, but is ultimately destroyed by the combined attacks of Adachi and Yu, and freeing Sho, yet losing his Minazuki-half in exchange to be able to access his half's Persona, Tsukuyomi.

== Non-player characters ==
=== Ryotaro Dojima ===
Voiced by:

English: JB Blanc (2008-2015), Ray Chase (Revival)
Japanese: Unshō Ishizuka (2008-2015), Ryōtarō Okiayu (Revival)

Ryotaro Dojima (堂島 遼太郎, Dōjima Ryōtarō) is Yu Narukami's uncle (younger brother of Yu's mother) who works as a detective on the Inaba police force mostly alongside the rookie Tohru Adachi. Dojima is Nanako's hard-working single father, but mostly spends his time away from family due to the murders. When Yu starts getting related with the incidents, Dojima starts questioning him, but wishes to avoid doubting him. Nevertheless, he comes to appreciate him as another member of his family. While interacting with him, Dojima reveals his obsession with a hit-and-run accident that killed his wife Chisato (千里) and continues to investigate it, to the point where he neglects his daughter. Dojima later realizes he was scared of seeing Nanako who reminds him of his late wife, and decides to spend more time with his family. However, he still continues to search for Chisato's killer, but as his duty as detective. Dojima also makes an appearance in Persona 4 Arena having dinner with his family following Yu's return to Inaba.

Dojima represents the protagonist's Social Link to The Hierophant, and this is symbolized in the anime adaptation by Yu Narukami's usage of the Persona Kohryu (コウリュウ, Kōryū).

Dojima is portrayed by Masashi Taniguchi in the stage play.

=== Nanako Dojima ===
Voiced by:

English: Karen Strassman (2008-2015), Courtney Shaw (Revival)
Japanese: Akemi Kanda

Nanako Dojima (堂島 菜々子, Dōjima Nanako) is the young cousin of Yu, and Dojima's only daughter. Nanako is a guileless girl, and is usually left at home due to her father's work. Nanako is capable of taking care of herself. When Yu starts spending the day with her, Nanako starts calling him "Big Bro" after Chie jokingly called him that. During her talks with Yu, Nanako worries about whether her father loves her or not due to the little time he spends at home and her mother's death. Yu helps Nanako come to terms with her father's busy professional life, realizing that he also missed her mother as much as she did.

Late in the story, Nanako is kidnapped by Taro Namatame and placed into the TV world. During the investigation of Namatame, Nanako passes away for reasons unknown to the doctor; Yu is then forced to choose between exacting revenge on Namatame or sparing him. If Namatame is killed, Nanako's death is set and the game will end. If the protagonist chooses not to take revenge and save his life, Nanako will be miraculously resuscitated, claiming she heard the player characters' voices. She also appears in Persona 4 Arena greeting Yu upon his return to Inaba, and accidentally boards Yu's train as he is leaving Inaba for a second time.

Nanako represents the player's Social Link to Justice, which is symbolized by Yu Narukami's usage of the Persona Sraosha (スラオシャ, Suraosha) in Persona 4: The Animation.

=== Igor ===
Voiced by:

English: Dan Woren (2008-2012), Kirk Thornton (Revival)
Japanese: Isamu Tanonaka (2008-2014), Bin Shimada (Revival)

Igor (イゴール, Igōru) is a mysterious, long-nosed gentleman who resides in the Velvet Room, which takes place in an unknown dimension and has take a form of a limousine. Igor reads Yu's fortune in the game's beginning and later gives his advice. As in the other Persona games, Igor's purpose is to assist the player in acquiring new powers and Personas. Following Izanami's defeat in the game's ending, Igor leaves Yu to see the original form from the TV world, satisfied with his journey's conclusion. Despite the death of Isamu Tanonaka due to myocardial infarction in 2010, the animation version in 2011 still uses his original voices recorded in the game. For Persona 4 Arena, Igor appears to Yu in a dream where his dialogue is the same from the start of Persona 4 where he first met him.

=== Margaret ===
Voiced by:

English: Michelle Ann Dunphy (2008-2013), Marisha Ray (2014-present)
Japanese: Sayaka Ohara

Margaret (マーガレット, Māgaretto) is a female chauffeur who works as Igor's assistant. She appears alongside him in the Velvet Room, supporting Yu, replacing her sister Elizabeth when she leaves on a journey. After meeting her alone, she asks Yu to create a particular Persona using a certain fusion type skill, as a euphemism for drawing out corresponding aspects of Yu's personality. She seems very composed and dignified at first glance, although she actually has a silly and whimsical sense of humor. In the second playthrough, Margaret challenges Yu's team to fight her using multiple Personas, wanting to discover for herself the reason why her sister abandoned her role in the Velvet Room. Following her defeat, Margaret reveals Elizabeth's wish to save the protagonist of Persona 3 and claims that she would do the same for Yu.

Margaret also appears in Persona 3 Portable, as the one in charge of the Vision Quest and can be fought as a boss. In Persona 4 Arena she guides Yu in his quest during the P-1 Grand Prix tournament. She is playable in the console version of Persona 4 Arena Ultimax via DLC. There, she covertly helps the Investigation Team and the Shadow Operatives and observes Yu and Sho's final battle alongside her sister, Elizabeth.

Margaret represents the player's Social Link to The Empress, which is symbolized in the anime adaptation by Yu Narukami's usage of the Persona Isis (イシス, Ishisu).

=== Mayumi Yamano ===
Voiced by:

Japanese: Kanae Itō (Persona 4), Yuhko Kaida (The Animation, The Golden Animation)

Mayumi Yamano (山野 真由美, Yamano Mayumi) is a TV reporter who becomes part of a publicized scandal for her supposed affair with Taro Namatame. To hide from the public, she stays at Inaba's Amagi Inn and becomes the first murder victim of the game. Adachi eventually learned of her relationship with Namatame and threw her into the TV world in a fit of jealous rage, resulting in her death.

=== Kinshiro Morooka ===
Voiced by:

English: Kirk Thornton
Japanese: Osamu Ryutani

Kinshiro Morooka (諸岡 金四郎, Morooka Kinshirō) is the homeroom and philosophy teacher of Yasogami High School's Class 2-2. Derisively called King Moron in English and Morokin (モロキン) in Japanese by his students, he is snobbish and judgemental to current teenage pop culture and constantly reminds his students to study hard, addressing them with disdain almost to the point of verbal abuse. He constantly threatens to expel students that misbehave, and is very briefly suspected of being involved in the murders due to particularly misogynistic comments he makes about Mayumi Yamano. Morooka is killed after Rise Kujikawa is rescued by the protagonist from the Midnight Channel. However, his murder has nothing to do with the Midnight Channel, being a copycat murder committed by the attention-seeking Mitsuo Kubo.

=== Saki Konishi ===
Voiced by:

English: Jessica Straus (Persona 4, The Animation)
Japanese: Hitomi Murakami (Persona 4), Hina Nakase (The Animation)

Saki Konishi (小西 早紀, Konishi Saki) is a third-year student at Yasogami High. She is the only daughter of the Konishi family that runs Inaba's only liquor store, Konishi Liquors. She took a job in Junes' Inaba branch, despite objections from her parents, and blamed the store for ruining their business. As such, Saki blames Yosuke Hanamura and his family for her current plight. She is the second victim killed in the TV world after the culprit attempts to assault her. Hitomi Murakami voices her in the Japanese edition of the video game, and Hina Nakase replaces Murakami for the anime.

=== Kou Ichijo ===
Voiced by:

English: Vic Mignogna (The Animation)
Japanese: Kouhei Fukuhara (Persona 4), Daisuke Ono (The Animation, The Golden Animation)

Kou Ichijo (一条 康, Ichijō Kō) is a member of Yasogami's Basketball Team and is very passionate about the sport. He often hangs out with the Soccer Club's Daisuke Nagase. An adopted child of a rich family, he becomes concerned regarding his place in the world without knowing his roots. He explains to the protagonist and Daisuke that he feels pressure to uphold the family name and do as he is asked. Soon, his grandmother tells him that his playing basketball is fine by her; Kou had been freed from his family responsibility, since his adopted parents had a biological daughter that was recently born. After this, Kou finds everything in his life meaningless since he felt he had nothing to live for. It is through Yu and Daisuke that Kou realizes that he has to choose his own path in life and find his own meaning in living. Near the game's ending, Kou decides he will study abroad once finishing school to give recognition to see family in his own way. He and Daisuke both serve as the player's Social Link to Strength; in the anime, Kou Ichijo serves as this link and is represented by Yu Narukami's usage of the Persona Rakshasa (ラクシャーサ, Rakushāsa).

Kou is portrayed by Motohiro Ota in the stage play.

=== Daisuke Nagase ===
Voiced by:

English: David Vincent (The Animation)
Japanese: Tomokazu Sugita (The Animation, The Golden Animation

Daisuke Nagase (長瀬 大輔, Nagase Daisuke) is one of Yu's classmates. Despite his wild exterior, he is actually a friendly teenager who initially acts shy towards girls. Daisuke was humiliated during a break-up with his middle school girlfriend. This caused him to not put his full effort into anything, including soccer, since he was afraid that it would be all for naught. Through a couple of verbal fights with Kou and Yu, Daisuke realizes that he was giving up on everything too soon and he would rather quit than meet with failure. After realizing this, he speaks with his ex-girlfriend and gains the closure he needed by explaining how he felt. Daisuke thanks Kou and Yu for their help. He and Kou both serve as the player's Social Link to Strength; in the anime, Kou Ichijo serves as this link.

Daisuke is portrayed by Motohiro Ota in the stage play.

=== Ai Ebihara ===
Voiced by:

English: Julie Ann Taylor (2008-2012)
Japanese: Kanae Itō

Ai Ebihara (海老原 あい, Ebihara Ai) is a quiet student from Yasogami High who becomes the sports team manager. However, she is more interested in shopping, and befriends Yu in the meantime. Ai later confesses her crush in the club's team captain (either Daisuke Nagase or Kou Ichijo, depending on which club the protagonist has joined) to Yu. As Yu befriends Ai, she reveals that as a child she was overweight and called ugly by her peers. After her family struck its fortune and moved to Inaba, she decided to change herself and studied fashion while working to slim down until she became as attractive and popular as she wanted to be. After learning the team captain she follows is interested in another girl, Ai contemplates suicide but is stopped by Yu. Afterwards, Yu and Ai can pose as a couple, or remain friends until Ai falls for Yu. In either case, she grows to trust him. Ai Ebihara represents the player's Social Link to The Moon, which is represented in the anime by Yu's ability to summon the Persona Yamata no Orochi (ヤマタノオロチ).

=== Naoki Konishi ===
Voiced by:

English: Derek Stephen Prince (Persona 4, The Animation)
Japanese: Tsubasa Yonaga (The Animation)

Naoki Konishi (小西 尚紀, Konishi Naoki) is the brother of Saki Konishi, the second victim of the murders. His father owns the Konishi Liquors store in the Shopping District, and he seems to hold a grudge against Yu for being friends with Yosuke, the son of Junes' manager. Naoki is constantly pitied by everybody for the death of his sister. As a result, Naoki seems trapped and is unable to move on with his own life since he is constantly reminded of Saki's death. While spending time with Yu, Naoki is able to understand he did miss Saki and decides to move on with his life. Konishi represents the player's Social Link to The Hanged Man; in the anime this is shown by Yu Narukami's ability to summon the Persona Makami (マカミ).

=== Yumi Ozawa ===
Voiced by:

Japanese: Kanae Itō

Yumi Ozawa (小沢 結実, Ozawa Yumi) is one of Yu's schoolmates who is a member of the Yasogami drama club. During one of the club's meetings, she is tricked by her mother to see her ill father, whom left her and her mother when she was younger. Yumi is torn between her hatred for him and her father's request to see his daughter before he passes away. As the relationship progresses, Yumi becomes even more torn and distressed because she is unable to deal with any decisions regarding her life due to her parents. After Yumi's father dies, Yumi decides to leave the Drama Club and to not blame any future hardships on her parents or anyone else. She also reveals her love to Yu which he can accept or reject. She and Ayane both represent the player's Social Link to The Sun. In the anime, Ayane fulfills this role for Yu Narukami and Yumi is watching the school during the Culture Arts festival, showing apparent disgust at Kou Ichijo's acting in the anime adaptation.

=== Ayane Matsunaga ===
Voiced by:

English: Michelle Ann Dunphy (2008-2012)
Japanese: Tomoka Endo

Ayane Matsunaga (松永 綾音, Matsunaga Ayane) is one of Yu's classmates who is a member of the school's music club. She is a very shy girl and is often left out from the club's activities due to her poor playing and unwillingness to speak up. Yu helps Ayane practice. Though not very skilled with the trombone at first, continuous practice helps her perform very well. When one of the trombone players for an upcoming concert gets in an accident, Ayane is appointed to take his place. Before the performance, the original trombone player returns and Ayane relinquishes the part back to the original player. She soon accepts that it is good to be a little selfish from time to time, regardless of the consequences. Yu can also start a relationship with Ayane during these events. She and Yumi both represent the player's Social Link to The Sun; in the anime, this is represented by Yu's ability to summon the Personas Tam Lin (タムリン, Tamu Rin) and Suparna.

=== Hisano Kuroda ===
Voiced by:

Japanese: Ikuko Tani (The Animation)

Hisano Kuroda (黒田 ひさ乃, Kuroda Hisano) is an old woman dressed in mourning clothes who befriends Yu. Yu meets Hisano at his part-time janitorial job at the hospital. Upon meeting her, Yu learns that she feels guilty over her husband's death, feeling that she caused him to die by wishing for it. Hisano and her unnamed husband were very much in love for the time they were together, but eventually Hisano's husband became ill and gradually lost all memory of Hisano. Alone, sad and helpless, she wished for him to die in order for them both to escape the pain. It is through Yu that she realizes that even though her husband lost his memory, the time and love that they shared was genuine and true, allowing Hisano to move on. She eventually leaves Inaba to live with her children. She represents the player's Social Link to Death; in the anime, this is represented by Yu's Persona Mot (モト, Moto).

=== Shu Nakajima ===
Voiced by:

Japanese: Mitsuhiro Ichiki (The Animation)

Shu Nakajima (中島 秀, Nakajima Shū) is a young student whom the protagonist can tutor part-time. As Yu spends more time with Shu, it is revealed that Shu is depressed because of all the pressure he feels to be the best in everything alongside the constant stream of praise he receives from his mother. He also mentions a transfer student whom he envies, as this student surpasses Shu in almost every way. In order to stay on top and live up to his mother's expectations, Shu cheats on a test and ends up being suspended from school, much to his mother's disappointment and disdain. Yu helps Shu realize that he should find more meaning in his life than just trying to face forward and be number one at everything; he and his mother reconcile and start over. During the last month in game, when Yu converses with Shu, he mentions that he and that same transfer student are now great friends and his own popularity has also increased as a result. He represents the player's Social Link to The Tower; which is shown in Persona 4: The Animation by Yu's summon of the Persona Abaddon (アバドン, Abadon).

=== Eri Minami and Yuuta Minami ===
Voiced by:

English: Valerie Arem (Eri, The Animation)
Japanese: Miki Itō (Eri), Hidemi Anzai (Yuuta)

Eri Minami (南 絵里, Minami Eri) is the stepmother of Yuuta (勇太, Yūta), one of the children from the daycare center where Yu can work part-time. As Yu gets to know Eri and Yuuta, they reveal that they faced difficulties accepting each other as part of the family. Eri and Yuuta's father were only married for about half a year before he had to leave for China on business. As such, Eri and Yuuta had nothing that connected them and so they grew more and more distant. Both Eri and Yuuta care about each other very much but are held back by their own insecurities regarding the relationship. Yu helps the both of them realize that in order for a relationship to work. When they finally decide on working to become a family, Eri and Yuuta leave the day care center behind, thanking Yu for his help. Minami represents the player's Social Link to Temperance; in the anime, this is symbolized by Yu's ability to summon the Persona Genbu (ゲンブ).

=== Sayoko Uehara ===
Voiced by:

English: Wendee Lee (Persona 4, The Animation)
Japanese: Natsuko Kuwatani (The Animation)

Sayoko Uehara (上原 小夜子, Uehara Sayoko) is a nurse from the hospital where Yu can work part-time as a janitor. Yu learns that she has a cynical view on her profession as patients leave her, whether by dying or recovering and leaving the hospital. As such, she attempts to seduce the protagonist often. Her attitude changes when she discovers that one of her patients from the hospital she previously worked at has died. When she learns of his death, she becomes a strict workaholic. During one of the days that Yu is working, Sayoko collapses and realizes while talking with him that she was overworking herself and her coworkers to escape the loneliness of her patients leaving her and the pain of losing a patient under her care. She decides she will be leaving the hospital to rediscover why she originally became a nurse in the first place. It is later revealed that she went to Africa as a volunteer. Sayoko represents the player's Social Link to The Devil; in the animated series, this is represented by Yu's ability to fusion summon the Persona Beelzebub (ベルゼブブ, Beruzebubu).

=== Fox ===
A mysterious Fox (キツネ, Kitsune) that serves as the guardian of the Tatsuhime Shrine and assists the investigation team in the TV world, where he will restore the team's Spirit Points (SP) for an initially high price. The protagonist first encounters the Fox after he donates to the shrine, which has fallen on hard times. To help the Fox out, the protagonist fulfills the wishes that people write on the ema the shrine receives; as more wishes are fulfilled, the shrine's donations will increase and the Fox's SP restoration service will become noticeably cheaper. When all of the wishes have been granted, the shrine is restored to its former glory. In the epilogue, the Fox is shown to have had children. The Fox represents the player's Social Link to The Hermit; in Persona 4: The Animation, this is indicated by Yu Narukami's ability to summon the Persona Arahabaki (アラハバキ).

=== Noriko Kashiwagi ===
Voiced by:

Japanese: Sayaka Ohara (Persona 4), Hitomi Nabatame (The Animation, The Golden Animation)

Noriko Kashiwagi (柏木 典子, Kashiwagi Noriko) replaces Morooka as Class 2-2's homeroom teacher after he is killed, and she is also the biology teacher for Yasogami High. She flirts with her students. Even though her personality is the polar opposite of Morooka's, she is greatly hated by the students of 2-2. Kashiwagi also makes an appearance in Persona 3 Portable. She is at the beach in the male protagonist's path when the player characters are searching for attractive women.

=== Hanako Ohtani ===
Voiced by:

English: Jessica Straus (2008-2012)
Japanese: Ryō Agawa

Hanako Ohtani (大谷 花子, Ōtani Hanako) is an obese classmate of the protagonist. She teams up with Ms. Kashiwagi for some scenes later in the game. It is also revealed later in the game that she is the person responsible for putting items in Yu's shoe locker, as she has a crush on him.

=== Old Lady Shiroku ===
Voiced by:

Japanese: Makiko Nabei (The Animation)

Old Lady Shiroku (四六商店の女将, Shiroku Shōten no Okami) is the owner of the Shiroku Store where the player can buy medicine and other expendable items. In the anime, she appears during the summer festival where she runs a kakigōri stall which is emptied out by Teddie. Shiroku has no speaking role in the game.

=== Master Daidara ===
Voiced by:

English: Christopher Corey Smith (The Animation)
Japanese: Hisao Egawa (The Animation, The Golden Animation)

Master Daidara (だいだら．の店主, Daidara. no Tenshu) is the owner of the Daidara Metalworks where the player can purchase weapons to use in the TV world. In the anime, he appears during the summer festival as the main pyrotechnician who helps encourage Nanako in her quest to find Yu. Daidara is unvoiced in the game.

=== Marie ===
Voiced by:

English: Eden Riegel (2012-2015), Ari Thrash (Revival)
Japanese: Kana Hanazawa

Marie (マリー, Marī) is a teenage girl who is introduced in the remaster Persona 4 Golden. She has no memories and cannot remember her own name; Margaret was the one who gave her the name "Marie". Yu first meets Marie as he gets to Inaba, and she later asks him to help find out more about her. Marie is also the focus of a new Social Link side story, the Aeon Arcana, a Major Arcana of the Thoth Tarot, in which Yu shows Marie around Inaba and introduces her to his friends and which is indicated in Persona 4: The Golden Animation by Yu Narukami's ability to summon the Persona Kaguya Hime (カグヤひめ). During the Social Link, Marie shows Yu the only hint from her past: an old bamboo comb she is sure belonged to her.

After Yu and his friends defeat Ameno-sagiri, Marie vanishes from the real world; if the player does not find her after too long, she will be erased from everyone's memories. In an old cabin near Inaba, Margaret (on a promise to Yu) pulls the entire group through an old TV set, which serves as the only portal to the Hollow Forest, Marie's TV World dungeon. Margaret explains the situation to them: Marie has entered the TV World of her own free will, and that she is going to erase her existence to save the human world. Although initially reluctant, Yu's friends vow to rescue Marie, as she is as much of a friend to them as she is to Yu.

When the group finally finds Marie, she reveals that she is Kusumi-no-Okami (クスミノオオカミ, Kusumi-no-Ōkami), one part of a greater power like Kunino- and Ameno-sagiri; her role was to spy on the real world for Ameno-sagiri, and absorb the TV world's fog from the real world if the two Sagiri were defeated. The main characters rid her of the fog by defeating the monstrous form of Kusumi-no-Okami and she gains a bond to the real world, allowing her to exist there permanently. After Izanami-no-Okami's defeat, she reveals that she was one of two halves of Izanami, Izanami-no-Mikoto (イザナミノミコト, Izanami-no-Mikoto); Izanami-no-Okami was the half that granted people's wishes, while Izanami-no-Mikoto was the half that actually thought of the good of people. Over time, Izanami-no-Okami's intentions began to diverge from Izanami-no-Mikoto's; as a result, the latter lost all of her power and memories, becoming a "shard".

When Yu confronts Izanami (the gas station attendant), given that the player had saved Marie in time, Izanami will briefly mention Marie, calling her pathetic for holding onto the bamboo comb (combs are seen as a symbol of separation). After Izanami's defeat, Marie apparently vanishes along with her, as she is absent for Yu's departure at the end of the year. However, when Yu returns to Yasoinaba in summer, she reappears in the real world as a weather forecaster, taking on the stage name Mariko Kusumi (久須美 鞠子, Kusumi Mariko). In the ending, she will proclaim her love for Yu on TV while the main group watches on, much to their disbelief and Rise's outrage. At the end of the credits, she can be seen in a photograph together with the rest of the main characters.

Marie makes a playable appearance in Persona 4 Arena Ultimax, available as downloadable content. She meets up with Yu before the other Investigation Team members meet him. When Kagutsuchi covers Inaba with a red fog, Marie assists the Investigation Team and Shadow Operatives to end Hi-no-Kagutsuchi's reign. In Ultimax, Kaguya Hime has now become Marie's Persona.

=== Aika Nakamura ===
Voiced by:

English: Cassandra Lee Morris (The Animation), Judy Alice Lee (Revival)
Japanese: Aoi Yūki

Aika Nakamura (中村 あいか, Nakamura Aika) is initially introduced in Persona 4: The Animation and made in-game debut in Persona 4 Revival, where she is one of Yu Narukami's classmates. She has a meek personality, though often unfazed by others' outbursts, and does not talk very much. Her family owns the Chinese Diner Aiya, where she works; this surprises Yosuke, who never knew this despite their being classmates. She is also in charge of delivery, acting as the Investigation Team's "catering service" in some episodes. A running gag is that she will deliver anywhere and at any time, regardless of the customer's circumstances. This first occurs in episode 6, when she delivers two orders of nikudon to Chie while the four are being chased by Kanji (much to Yosuke's disbelief). She also seems to appear in any restaurant that the group goes to, such as when she takes part-time jobs in Tatsumi Port Island and the Amagi Inn. The second drama CD released through the Blu-ray box sets titled "Perfect Delivery" features Aika being assisted by Yu on her daily rounds.

== Characters introduced in other media ==
=== Persona 4 Arena series ===
==== Labrys ====
Voiced by:

English: Cindy Robinson
Japanese: Ayana Taketatsu

Labrys (ラビリス, Rabirisu) was mentioned in Persona 3 Drama CD: Moonlight and then is introduced her full appearance in Persona 4 Arena as a new character. Labrys was created in 1999 at the Kirijo Ergonomics lab and most of her development was done through painfully forcing her to fight other models of her series. She grew close to one of her sisters, #024, but was forced to destroy her too. After disappearing from Mitsuru Kirijo's plane, she appears in the TV world during the events of the P-1 Grand Prix tournament. She appears dressed in the Yasogami High School uniform, and refers to herself as Miss President. She wields a large cybernetic double-headed axe (a labrys) in battle. In the manga Aigis starts to refer to her as her older sister.

During the story mode, it is revealed that the General Teddie (クマ総統, Kuma-sōtō) who hosted the tournament is actually Labrys' Shadow in disguise. The player leads Labrys to face her other self, which represents her desire to live like a normal human and attend high school. When Labrys rejects her other self's wishes, it becomes a Shadow accompanied by the greater Shadow Asterius (アステリオス, Asuteriosu), which resembles a demonic bull. After the player defeats Shadow Labrys in battle, Labrys accepts her other self and it turns into Ariadne (アリアドネ, Ariadone) of the Fortune Arcana, a Persona that shares design motifs with Labrys. She then joins Mitsuru's group to find the real culprit behind the P-1 Grand Prix.

In the video games, she initially was released solely as a boss character in the arcade versions of P4U. When the game was ported to the PlayStation 3, she was made an unlockable playable character as both her normal self with Ariadne and her Shadow self with Asterius. Labrys as a playable character was eventually added to the arcade versions of the game on March 22, 2012.

In Persona 4 Arena Ultimax, Labrys is the protagonist in the Persona 3 Chapter.

==== Sho Minazuki ====
Voiced by:

English: Todd Haberkorn
Japanese: Kenichi Suzumura

Sho Minazuki (皆月 翔, Minazuki Shō) is introduced in the sequel to Persona 4 Arena, Persona 4 Arena Ultimax. He wears a Yasogami High School uniform jacket around his waist and wields dual katana-like swords, each possessing a trigger guard. He was one of Shuji Ikutsuki's test subjects like the members of Strega. He was Ikutsuki's favorite test subject, due to his fast progress. As part of Ikutsuki's experiments, Sho was isolated from the outside world and never made any contact with anyone other than Ikutsuki, whom he refers to as his 'father' and even has the same habit of making puns. In one experiment to awaken his Persona through the use of Plume of Dusk, instead of a Persona, another personality called Minazuki, was born. Minazuki's birth resulted in Sho being abandoned by Ikutsuki after the former tried to kill him in attempt to protect Sho.

He was the culprit behind Labrys' kidnapping and the P-1 Grand Prix, working together with a malevolent entity called Hi-no-Kagutsuchi. Minazuki agrees to gather the Persona Fragments to fully summon Kagutsuchi, in exchange that he will destroy the world, believing it will end Sho's suffering. When the Persona fragments are gathered and Kagutsuchi was successfully summoned, Kagutsuchi betrays him and possesses Sho's body. After Kagutsuchi's defeat at the hands of Yu and Adachi, Sho is unable to sense Minazuki within him, but is now able to independently summon his Persona. After being defeated by Yu one last time, he is inspired by the power of Yu's bonds and leaves to start his own journey, vowing to kill Yu the next time they meet.

Sho and Minazuki have two contrasting personalities. Sho is a flippant, hot-headed, and anxious young man with vicious streak, while Minazuki is cold and calculating with no care for the well-being of others except Sho. Sho's past causes him to view bonds and such as meaningless, viewing friendship and such as nothing but licking each other's wounds. But it's later revealed that he is simply lonely and doesn't know how to understand people due to his previous isolation.

Sho does not possess a Persona, though he is still capable of matching a Persona user using nothing but his own (practically superhuman) physical abilities of the Sun Arcana. But Minazuki has a Persona named Tsukiyomi (ツキヨミ) of the Moon Arcana, and he also appears as the final boss in the game's arcade mode with a Persona.

=== Persona Q series ===
==== Zen and Rei ====
Voiced by:

English: Keith Silverstein (Zen), Ashly Burch (Rei)
Japanese: Yūki Kaji (Zen), Kaori Nazuka (Rei)

Zen and Rei are amnesiacs encountered in Persona Q: Shadow of the Labyrinth: they are residents of a mysterious haven in the rift which takes the shape of Yasogami High (part of the setting for Persona 4), and due to story events do not appear in any other Persona title involving the members of SEES or the Investigation Team. Zen is a taciturn young man who is unfamiliar with people's habits and has a tendency to take things too literally, but is otherwise devoted to Rei's well-being, while Rei is a cheerful and innocent girl who has a strange metabolism that causes her to be forever hungry. Depending on which protagonist was chosen at the start, either SEES or the Investigation Team will encounter them first. If the Persona 4 Protagonist is chosen, then he, Chie, Teddie, and Yukiko start exploring the first labyrinth only to encounter Zen and Rei not far from the entrance. Lacking other leads, the Investigation Team agrees to let them tag along for the time being. When they meet SEES, the Investigation Team decides to attempt to restore Zen and Rei's memories as this is their only lead to a way out of the haven in the rift. Zen is later revealed to be a part of Chronos, a being presiding over death, who was sent to take a young girl named Niko who had died of illness to "where all life returns". At this stage, Rei is abducted and the school's clock tower undergoes a Tartarus-esque transformation, and although Zen at first decides to save her on his own, SEES and the Investigation Team resolve to stay and help him out.

Zen uses a crossbow in battle. With this, he can shoot various objects at enemies, such as arrows or bullets. Unlike the other members of SEES or the Investigation Team, neither he nor Rei possess or are able to use Personas: however, they are capable of fighting Shadows by using an array of battle abilities unique to them. When Rei is kidnapped, Zen starts using the abilities she was using until then.

==== Hikari ====
Voiced by: Misato Fukuen

Hikari (ひかり) is a character introduced in Persona Q2: New Cinema Labyrinth. She is a teenage girl that one day wakes up in the movie theater, she is the last person to enter the cinema. At first, she is very shy and quiet and will have difficulties speaking to anyone that isn't Nagi, another resident of the theater. Her shyness is due to the trauma and depression of her bad past: she was often bullied and made fun of by others for being different, although due to psychogenic amnesia, she can't properly remember her past during the game. Unable to cope with the pain of living, she ends up in the Cinema in the collective unconsciousness during a dream, there she meets Nagi, who promises to protect Hikari from any harm by isolating her from reality. As our heroes change the endings of the movies, Hikari slowly starts to open up and begins communicating with them, and later in the game. After finishing the third labyrinth, Hikari follows Doe to one of the movies, titled ???, where she faces all of her past traumas, causing her to fully remember her memories and forcing her into a change of heart, revealing the title of the movie being named after her, "Hikari". After facing her memories with courage and accepting them, Hikari successfully rehabilitates from her depression and acts as a combat support. After the ending of the game, Hikari wakes up from her dream and is now able to speak to her father again, confessing her desire to continue the production of the movie that she was creating before she fell into depression.

==== Nagi ====
Voiced by: Kikuko Inoue

Nagi (ナギ) is a character introduced in Persona Q2: New Cinema Labyrinth. Curator of the Cinema, Nagi is a woman that protects Hikari from all harm by keeping her in the Cinema, and Hikari thinks she is the only person who can trust due to her kind and caring personality. She congratulates our heroes every time they clear a labyrinth, even claiming that she doesn't have a choice. However, near the end of the game, she drops off her guise and reveals herself as Enlil, an administrator of the collective unconsciousness with a delusional and patronizing view towards humanity, believing that they are weak willed and the only way to give them salvation is to trap them inside her cinema domain, putting an end to their thoughts and isolating them from the hardships of life, at the cost of their freedom and increasing their depression even further. After our heroes defeat her, she returns into the form of the black-haired Nagi and vanishes into light, finally acknowledging the possibilities and strengths of humanity, but not before leaving a warning that she will return as long as people wish for her to, finally allowing the party to leave the Cinema.

==== Doe ====
Voiced by: Kazuhiko Inoue

Doe (ドー) is a character introduced in Persona Q2: New Cinema Labyrinth. He is a weird shadow-like figure that is mostly quiet, that one day appeared in the theater, acting as a weird projectionist that would play the same movies over and over again. He would generate a key able to unlock the Cinema exit every time a labyrinth was completed. Hikari is very afraid of him, and has a lot of trouble communicating or getting near with him, although she starts to become less fearful as the game progresses. After Hikari consensually followed Doe, leading her to ???, she decides to face her own past and so that she can recollect her memories lost from her amnesia. Our heroes, thinking that Doe kidnapped Hikari, they fight him in the deepest part of the labyrinth, after he goes berserk due to Hikari rejecting him. After they defeat him the truth is revealed: Doe is nothing more than a cognition of Hikari's father, created by her due to her depression and low self-esteem, starting to make her develop an inability to differ what is actually harmful to her and what actually isn't. This causes her to develop paranoia towards her father's supposed goodwill that results in the creation of Doe, whom she perceives as a terrifying figure that she could not even get close to. Realizing this, Hikari steps forward and hugs him, as he turns into an image of her father. She tearfully confesses all of her negative thoughts to him, and after the confession, he turns into one of the keys and fades into light.

=== Persona 4: Dancing All Night ===
==== Kanami Mashita ====
Voiced by:

English: Rena Strober
Japanese: Minako Kotobuki

Kanami Mashita (真下 かなみ, Mashita Kanami) is a character who makes her debut in Persona 4: Dancing All Night after having been mentioned in previous titles. She is an idol working with Takura Productions under the name "Kanamin", and member of the idol group "Kanamin Kitchen". In Persona 4, after Rise quits show business, her manager Minoru Inoue takes on the role of Kanami's manager instead; however, he vacates this position after Rise decides to return. She makes her first true appearance as a playable character in Persona 4: Dancing All Night, working with Ryotaro and Nanako Dojima to find the Investigation Team and the missing members of her idol group, who have been abducted and trapped in the world of the Midnight Stage. She makes brief cameo appearances in Persona 4: The Animation and Persona 4: The Golden Animation.

==== Kanamin Kitchen ====
Kanamin Kitchen is an idol group introduced in Persona 4: Dancing All Night. Led by Kanami, they give themselves meat-themed introductions, hence the "Kitchen" title. They were scheduled to perform at the Love Meets Bonds festival, but when they mysteriously go missing, the Investigation Team travels into the Midnight Stage to rescue them. There, a mysterious voice manipulates them by revealing their deepest insecurities, using the power of Shadows to turn those feelings into large monsters, though the team is able to stop them with their dancing.

The members of Kanamin Kitchen, besides Kanami, are:

- Nozomi Nakahara, stage name "Nozomin" (voiced by Kaori Ishihara in Japanese): Seen as the "confident prince" of the group, in reality, she has social anxiety and struggles with talking to people.
- Tamami Uesugi, stage name "Tamamin" (voiced by Aya Uchida in Japanese): An assertive and overly aggressive member of the group. Later on, it is revealed that her attitude is a result of her being extremely self-conscious of how others think of her.
- Sumomo Ujima, stage name "Sumomin" (voiced by Cassandra Lee Morris in English and Chiaki Omigawa in Japanese): A member of the group originally from the countryside who speaks in a heavy country accent. Her small, doll-like appearance attracts attention from others, but wants to be seen as herself instead.
- Tomoe Sayama, stage name "Tomomin" (voiced by Yoko Honna in Japanese): is the oldest member of the group. While often seen as the most mature member of the group, in reality, she is very shy and has many hobbies, of which she was bullied for having in school. This led to her distancing herself from people and putting on a more mature act.

==== Kyoka Ochimizu ====
Voiced by:

Japanese: Aya Hisakawa

Kyoka Ochimizu is the strict, no-nonsense producer of the Love Meets Bonds festival and manager of Kanamin Kitchen. In her past, she was the manager of a rising idol named Yuko Osada. However, after Yuko took her own life, Ochimizu was blamed by the public for her death, resulting in a change in her demeanor. When a mysterious being appears in the studio to capture Kanami, she jumps in front of her and gets captured herself to save her. In the Midnight Stage, she appears after each of the Kanamin Kitchen girls are saved and brought to a Safe Room. She later reveals herself as the cause of Yuko's death, and allows herself to become overtaken by the voice's forces. The Investigation Team saves her and she strives to become a better manager for the group.

==== Minoru Inoue ====
Voiced by:

Japanese: Yasuaki Takumi

Minoru Inoue is the former manager of Rise Kujikawa. He makes brief appearances in Persona 4 and The Animation during Rise's Social Link events, attempting to convince her to return to show business. After she refuses, Inoue accepts and decides to become the manager for Kanami Mashita instead. He briefly makes an appearance during Rise's story in Persona 4 Arena. Having made a decision to return to becoming an idol, Inoue once again serves as Rise's manager.

He serves a more prominent role in Persona 4: Dancing All Night. He serves as Kanami's manager, and also takes charge of the Love Meets Bonds festival after Ochimizu goes missing. After the other members of Kanamin Kitchen go missing, Kanami requests for him to put out a missing persons report to find them, to which he accepts.

== Reception ==
The characters of Persona 4 have received major positive critical response as a result of the players' interactions with them and the themes discussed. The protagonist's role has been noted for allowing the player to build his own "self" along the game while questioning their own. Various comparisons were made regarding the social interactions from Persona 3 as the development of the social links are relatively faster and more important for the game's battles. The tone was noted to be sometimes lighter than in the prequel as it avoided touching depressing themes, but at the same time the characters' struggles were much more complex. Additionally, the protagonist's relationships with his relatives who he starts living with were commented for adding more variants to the relationships with these ones focusing on family relationships. Moreover, the inclusion of Shadow versions of the playable characters were praised for the themes they discussed, leading to personal crisis regarding which are their real traits. Kanji Tatsumi's storyline and his ambiguous sexuality received mixed responses, with many fans wishing he could have been portrayed as unquestionably gay with no ambiguity. Some critics felt in relation that Yosuke's reaction towards Kanji's sexuality seemed harsh and justified in how it was left unquestioned by the narrative. Dummied content within game files suggests that Yosuke may have at one point been a romance option for the protagonist, which some argue would have given more nuance in his reactions towards Kanji. Naoto Shirogane's storyline also received mixed responses, with some fans taking issue with how the parts of Naoto's narrative that reflect the experiences of transgender people were dismissed and contradicted by canonical insistence that Naoto is a cisgender girl.

Character designs employed in the game were noted to be "solid" with a clever use of animation for battles. The English voice actors' performance has been noted to be overall good with notes on the quality and delivery of the lines. However, flaws have been found within the execution of certain lines with IGN noting few moments in which some actors did not fit into their respective characters.
