= Kanji Tatsumi =

Fictional character in the 2008 video game Persona 4

- Persona character
- Kanji as seen in Persona 4
- First appearance: Persona 4 (2008)
- Designed by: Shigenori Soejima
- Voiced by: Troy Baker (English, 2008–13); Matthew Mercer (English, 2014–18); Daman Mills (English, Revival); Tomokazu Seki (Japanese)
- Portrayed by: Youichiro Omi (Note: Persona 4 stage play); Eiji Takigawa (Note: Persona 4 Arena & Persona 4 Arena Ultimax stage plays)

In-universe information
- Nationality: Japanese

Kanji Tatsumi (Japanese: 巽 完二, Hepburn: Tatsumi Kanji) is a character introduced in the 2008 PlayStation 2 video game Persona 4 by Atlus. In the game Kanji is a high school student who becomes famous in television after fighting delinquents in the streets. Kanji becomes a victim of a series of kidnappings where the person is thrown to a dimension known as the TV World and the main cast of characters goes to save him from his alternate self, his Shadow. After Kanji is saved from the experience with the Shadow being turned into a power known as Persona, he joins the Investigation Team, befriending them in the process. He has also appeared in other works such as the fighting game Persona 4 Arena and the crossover Persona Q: Shadow of the Labyrinth. He is voiced by Tomokazu Seki in Japanese, and Troy Baker in English in Persona 4, Persona 4 Golden, Persona 4: Arena, and the first twelve episodes of Persona 4: The Animation; his English voice actor for the remainder of Persona 4: The Animation, as well as subsequent games from Persona 4 Arena Ultimax to BlazBlue: Cross Tag Battle, is Matthew Mercer.

Kanji has received generally positive reception for his role in Persona 4 including his Social Links where he undergoes character development. However, his ambiguous sexual orientation has become one of the game's most controversial themes with several writers commenting on whether the game does a good job in explaining Kanji's personality.

== Concept and creation ==
Early designs for Kanji

Early designs of Kanji were drastically different from the final one. He was initially given the classic gang-style pompadour. His design was made by Shigenori Soejima. Kanji was given the image of an outlaw as symbolized by the skull in his clothing among other items. Nevertheless, he was created to give the impression of being nice person. He was still given an intimidating aura in order for the players to come up with several ideas to how he is before reaching his first appearances. His hairline was made to look nearly old and strong at the same moment. Both of Kanji's Personas are based on his own visual appearance, with focus on his skeleton. While it was given the idea of a robot, the design instead comes across as organic instead. The evolved Rakuten Maoh was instead based on Nobunaga Oda with an unintentional reference to his death incinerated as the Persona has flames. Early in development, Kanji was gonna be a senior delinquent with early sketches giving the idea that he is also a musician. He was initially given the "classic gang-style pompadour" in the making of his design.

Yu Namba, the Persona 4 Project Lead for Atlus USA, commented that while Kanji's Shadow might offend some players due to it being a gay stereotype, Kanji was nothing like a stereotype. Kanji's sexual orientation was left ambiguous to all players. Namba added "We would like everyone to play through the game and come up with their own answers to that question; there is no official answer ... What matters is that Kanji's other self cries out, 'Accept me for who I am!' I think it's a powerful message which many, if not all of us can relate to." Nich Maragos, Persona 4 Editor for Atlus USA, agreed with Namba, but personally held the opinion that Kanji was homosexual. The localization team of Persona 4 made a point of keeping as true to the original translation as possible. He cited Shadow Kanji's flamboyant personality and stated, "That flamboyance was also what the viewers of the Midnight Channel wanted to see: a typical gay person on TV that people would laugh at. The TV station broadcasts what the audience prefers to watch -- it's a stark portrayal of modern society." Namba also made some scenes which involved Kanji's sexual orientation more subtle without removing the scenes' value.

He is voiced by Tomokazu Seki in Japanese, Troy Baker in English, Matt Mercer in English releases between 2014 and 2018, and Daman Mills in English in Persona 4 Revival. Seki's portrayal was highly praised by the game's staff due to the delivery of his lines. Youichiro Omi was cast as Kanji Tatsumi for the Persona 4 musical.

== Appearances ==
Kanji Tatsumi first appears in the PlayStation 2 video game Persona 4. He is a delinquent who has a reputation for being a bully, and is the center of numerous rumors regarding a confrontation with a local biker gang. The fourth victim to be sent to the TV world, Kanji is revealed to have a complex with his Shadow revealing his dislike of women who criticized his hobbies. After the protagonist's group comes to save Kanji when he is trapped in the Midnight Channel, he accepts that his other self is an important part of his identity. Kanji learns of the Investigation Team's actions in Persona 4 and joins them to find the culprit.

His Persona is Take-Mikazuchi (タケミカヅチ), an imposing, black, robotic humanoid which has a skeleton-like design, like Kanji's shirt, and is armed with a large lightning bolt. Throughout Yu's interactions with Kanji, he reveals to be skilled at tailoring inspired by his family who runs a textile shop but stopped making dolls when accused by fellow students. Kanji eventually learns to take pride in his skills, rather than hide them. Shortly afterwards, Take-Mikazuchi evolves into Rokuten Maoh (ロクテンマオウ, Rokuten Maō), who has a fiery motif instead of Take-Mikazuchi's skeleton and lightning. In Persona 4: Golden, Kanji's new Persona is Take-Jizaiten (タケジザイテン), which resembles Rokuten Maoh but has elaborate white armor with red flame details. The friendship made with Kanji serves as the Social Link to The Emperor; this is signified in Persona 4: The Animation by Yu's Persona King Frost (キングフロスト, Kingu Furosuto).

He appears as a playable character in Persona 4 Arena and its sequel Persona 4 Arena Ultimax with Take-Mikazuchi. In the game's story mode, Kanji accidentally falls into the TV World's P-1 Grand Prix tournament and believes he is having a dream as he encounters his friends. He later believes that the main cause of this is his Shadow who has been impersonated by an unknown person. He also appears in the spin-off games Persona Q: Shadow of the Labyrinth and Persona 4: Dancing All Night. He is also available as a paid DLC character in BlazBlue: Cross Tag Battle, which features characters from the Persona 4 Arena, BlazBlue, Under Night In-Birth, and RWBY franchises.

== Reception ==
Kanji has received generally positive reception for his role in Persona 4. According to Gamasutra's Samantha Xu, reception for Kanji by Persona 4 players has been "neutral or positive." Kotaku's Kirk Hamilton found Kanji to be a particularly funny character in Persona 4 Golden. He cited Kanji's animal crackers and "general grump obliviousness." GamesRadar staff claimed that Kanji, as well as Chie and Teddie, were "well-defined by scenes that shift between comedy and drama fluidly." Game Informer's Kimberley Wallace felt that Kanji had one of the best Social Links in Persona 4. She stated, "From Kanji's hilarious overreactions to seeing him show his true emotions about his struggle, the social link is fun and heartwarming." He was also listed as the third best Persona character by Kimberley Wallace from Game Informer who praised the way he starts expressing he likes "adorable things" despite looking like a delinquent. IGN listed him as the best Persona character, commenting that while initially looking like the "resident tough guy" of Persona 4, "he represents everything excellent about Persona's outstanding characters and storytelling." Atlus senior project manager Masaru Nanba remarked on how popular the interpretation of Kanji and his Shadow were in the west in an interview with Famitsu in 2013.

=== Sexuality ===
While acting as a gay stereotype, Kanji's Shadow reveals his gender insecurities. This was one of the most discussed themes between writers.

Kanji's sexuality is one of the most controversial elements of Persona 4 for North American players according to 1UP.com's Andrew Fitch. Fitch worried that both gay and straight players in North America may be offended by how he was designed. Atlus senior project manager Masaru Nanba remarked on how popular the interpretation of Kanji and his Shadow were in the west in an interview with Famitsu in 2013. CVG Online's Matthew Pellett called the examination of his sexuality a "first" for Japanese role-playing games. Game Career Guide's Patrick Hayes stated that Shadow Kanji represents his "confusion over manhood and sexuality." Larry Hester of Complex ranked him the sixth best LGBT character in video games. IGN's Keza MacDonald cited Kanji as one of the few playable gay characters in a Japanese video game. Kotaku's Jason Schreier suggested that his lack of understanding of his sexuality comes from his young age. Colette Bennett, editor for Destructoid, felt that most American gamers would think Kanji was gay. She also felt that American designers were not "comfortable with portraying characters like Kanji." VG247's Julie Horup listed Kanji as an example of a homosexual character in video games. Huffington Post also featured it in a list of LGBT video game characters. Salon's Luke Winkie chose Kanji as his favourite LGBT character in video games. He stated, "By the end of the game you remember Kanji as your friend, not a kid in the closet."

Gamasutra's Xu noted that Kanji was one of the first video game characters to address his sexual identity in an "engaging and meaningful manner." She followed by stating that while he "may not be politically progressive enough to dub him the Harvey Milk of gaming ... his unique existence in Persona 4 is a small and positive move forward toward a more socially diversified gaming universe." Brenda Brathwaite, author of Sex in Video Games stated: "It would have been amazing if they would have made a concrete statement that he is gay. That we could play as a gay main character in a video game would be a big deal." She added, "I can find twenty things that I didn't like about how Kanji was portrayed, such as the game's juvenile nature in dealing with his sexuality, but there is a part of me that is thrilled there is a gay character in a game and that a game would portray how they are dealing with their inner struggles and interactions with friends." Dr. Antonia Levi, author of Samurai from Outer Space: Understanding Japanese Animation, discussed the differences between homosexuality's acceptability in the United States versus Japan. She claimed that unlike the US, Japan had no legislation related to homosexuality and did not view sexuality as a matter of "right or wrong." She explained that this was the reason for Kanji's sexual ambiguity. Xu cited Levi in her article to explain that Japanese people tend to be outwardly traditional, and their private sexual life is not judged. She stated, "For Kanji, working at his family's textile shop was a very traditional and respectable job, one that could have been at risk had he made a lifestyle choice to have an openly gay relationship with another man." She further cited Japan scholar Dr. Mark McLelland, who stated that "recent research has shown, the notion of 'coming out' is seen as undesirable by many Japanese gay men and lesbians as it necessarily involves adopting a confrontational stance against mainstream lifestyles and values, which many still wish to endorse." Xu explains that this culture may explain that Kanji was not rejecting the existence of his homosexuality or that the developers were not homophobic.

GameSpot's Carolyn Petit felt that his depiction "leaves a great deal to be desired" and stated that it "rejects" Kanji's sexuality instead of "embracing" it. She stated that she was intrigued by the idea behind Kanji initially, but was disappointed that Kanji's "shadow self" was based on his fear of women rather than his attraction to men. She felt that this theme didn't make sense, given the imagery of his dungeon. She claimed that the rejection of Kanji's sexuality "sends the message that homosexuality is shameful and should not be accepted." She also criticized the handling of how Yosuke reacts to Kanji's sexuality, claiming that his homophobia toward Kanji was left unaddressed and uncriticized by the end of the game. Metro Weekly's Sean Bugg felt that while elements of Kanji weren't homophobic, they weren't "exactly a PSA for tolerance, either." Author Jordan Youngblood described Kanji's depiction as "meta-commentary" on how players' engagement disrupts the "idealized vision of queer utopia." He also discusses Kanji's attraction to Naoto, noting that despite his efforts to dissociate from a "queer path" he still feels attracted to a character similarly regarded as queer.
