= Persona 4 Arena Ultimax =

2013 video game

- Japanese cover art for Arena Ultimax, featuring the playable cast
- Developers: Arc System Works; P-Studio
- Publishers: JP/NA: Atlus; PAL: Sega; WW: Sega (NS, PS4, Win)
- Directors: Kazuhisa Wada; Seiji Fukumoto; Takumi Iguchiya
- Producers: Katsura Hashino; Toshimichi Mori
- Artist: Shigenori Soejima
- Writer: Teppei Kobayashi
- Composer: Atsushi Kitajoh
- Series: Persona
- Platforms: Arcade; PlayStation 3; Xbox 360; Nintendo Switch; PlayStation 4; Windows
- Release: Arcade: JP: November 28, 2013; PlayStation 3: JP: August 28, 2014; NA: September 30, 2014; EU: November 21, 2014; AU: November 27, 2014; Xbox 360: NA: September 30, 2014; EU: November 21, 2014; AU: November 27, 2014; NS, PS4, Win: WW: March 17, 2022
- Genre: Fighting
- Modes: Single-player, multiplayer
- Arcade system: Taito Type X2

Persona 4 Arena Ultimax (Note: Persona 4: The Ultimax Ultra-Suplex Hold (Japanese: ペルソナ4 ジ・アルティマックス ウルトラスープレックスホールド, Hepburn: Perusona Fō: Ji Arutimakkusu Urutora-Sūpurekkusu Hōrudo)) is a 2013 fighting video game co-developed by Arc System Works and P-Studio and published by Atlus. It was first released for arcades with later ports for PlayStation 3 and Xbox 360 in 2014 and Nintendo Switch, PlayStation 4, and Windows in 2022. A direct sequel to Persona 4 Arena, the game is a spin-off from the Persona series, itself part of the larger Megami Tensei franchise. Gameplay follows standard fighting game conventions, with matches between two characters with individual movesets, and special expendable abilities.

Arena Ultimax takes place immediately after Persona 4 Arena; Arena is set two months after the events of Persona 4, and two years after Persona 3. After a supernatural occurrence known as the "Dark Hour" affects the town of Inaba, the Investigation Team of Persona 4 team up with the Shadow Operatives—a group formed by former members of SEES from Persona 3—to uncover the truth behind the P-1 Grand Prix and confront Sho Minazuki, a hostile Persona user. The storyline is told through visual novel segments. The original Persona 4 Arena Story Mode was included as downloadable content, which was included in the 2022 release for Nintendo Switch, PlayStation 4, and Windows.

Arena Ultimax was intended as closure for the story of Arena, beginning production following the first game's critical and commercial success. The main staff of Arena returned for Arena Ultimax, with the gameplay being refined based on feedback. The release was supported by downloadable content featuring characters and accessories. Selling over 280,000 units worldwide, the game was positively reviewed by critics; many cited the gameplay as superior to its predecessor.

== Gameplay ==
A match between Persona 3 character Aigis and newcomer Labrys in Persona 4 Arena Ultimax; the gameplay is similar to that of Arena, while adding new characters and mechanics.

Like the previous title, Persona 4 Arena Ultimax is a fighting game in which characters from both Persona 3 and Persona 4 battle each other using a variety of special moves, combos, and Persona abilities. Along with balance adjustments and new moves added to the returning characters, a new S-Hold system allows players to charge up their attacks. Also new to Ultimax is the ability to choose "Shadow Types" for many of the game's characters. These Shadow versions differ by being largely skill-based variants of their counterparts, employing a high-risk high-reward play style thanks to reduced normal attack damage and an altered move set with lacking defensive options. They also keep their SP over multiple rounds instead of resetting each time and possess an exclusive Shadow Rampage ability, which replaces the Burst command, giving the characters infinite SP for a limited time.

The game's story mode, told in a format similar to a visual novel, is now split into two separate campaigns for the Persona 3 and Persona 4 casts, as opposed to the individual campaigns for each character seen in its predecessor. Two additional story campaigns are available: one allows players to replay the character campaigns from Persona 4 Arena, while the other is included with the Tohru Adachi downloadable content and focuses on his actions during the story. Golden Arena is a dungeon-based survival mode, in which players travel through various dungeons to increase the fighter's stats. Players can build Social Links with a navigator character, giving them skills that can aid the player in battle. Online play now features a new lobby area, resembling an arcade, where players can interact with each other.

=== Playable characters ===
Along with all thirteen returning characters from the previous game, eight new characters (five of which were initially exclusive to the console version) are added to the roster, including a brand new character, Sho Minazuki. Furthermore, many (though not all) of these characters feature a Shadow Type. Other characters, such as Fuuka Yamagishi from Persona 3 and Theodore from Persona 3 Portable appear in a non-playable capacity.

- Aigis
- Akihiko Sanada
- Chie Satonaka
- Elizabeth^{d}
- Junpei Iori
- Kanji Tatsumi
- Ken Amada & Koromaru^{a}
- Labrys
- Margaret^{a}^{b}^{d}
- Marie^{a}^{b}^{d}
- Mitsuru Kirijo
- Naoto Shirogane
- Rise Kujikawa^{a}
- Shadow Labrys (Asterius)^{d}
- Sho Minazuki^{c}^{d}
- Teddie
- Tohru Adachi^{a}^{b}^{d}
- Yosuke Hanamura
- Yu Narukami
- Yukari Takeba
- Yukiko Amagi

Notes:
^a Post-launch addition to arcade version
^b Downloadable content character in PlayStation 3 and Xbox 360 versions
^c Sho Minazuki has two different character slots; one possessing a Persona and the other without. These are distinguished as "Minazuki" and "Sho" respectively in the English version, and has different Japanese pronunciations and texts in Japanese version.
^d Does not have a Shadow Type

== Synopsis ==
=== Setting and characters ===
The Persona 4 Arena duology is set in the Persona universe, revolving around groups of people who harness Personas—physical manifestations of their inner psyche—and use them to fight rogue psyches born from humanity's collective unconsciousness called Shadows. Arena Ultimax takes place a few days after the ending of Persona 4 Arena, which is set three months after the events of Persona 4 and two years after Persona 3. A key location in the story is the TV World, a metaphysical realm influenced by the wills of Inaba's population. Arena Ultimax begins when Inaba, the central location for both Persona 4 and Arena, is covered by a red fog, marking the return of the Dark Hour. The previous game's otherworldly fighting tournament returns as the "P-1 Climax", seeping into the real world and warping Inaba with replicas of locations from Persona 3.

The story is split into two parallel, differing narratives following the Investigation Team of Persona 4 (Yu Narukami, Yosuke Hanamura, Chie Satonaka, Yukiko Amagi, Kanji Tatsumi, Rise Kujikawa, Naoto Shirogane, and the friendly Shadow-like entity Teddie), a group of friends who investigated a serial murder case involving the TV World; and the Shadow Operatives (Aigis, Mitsuru Kirijo, Akihiko Sanada, Yukari Takeba, Junpei Iori, Fuuka Yamagishi, Ken Amada and the dog Koromaru), a covert group formed by former SEES members from Persona 3 to fight Shadows. The main protagonists of Persona 4 Arena are Persona 4 protagonist Narukami—a character blessed with the "Wild Card" power to summon multiple Personas; and Labrys, an Anti-Shadow weapon allied with the Shadow Operatives introduced in Arena. The main antagonists are Sho Minazuki, an unstable Persona user with a split personality; and Hi-no-Kagutsuchi, a being generated by the human Collective Unconscious and its latent despair. Additional characters in the narrative and DLC gameplay are Tohru Adachi, a central antagonist in Persona 4; Marie, a character introduced in Persona 4 Golden; and Margaret and Elizabeth, attendants from the metaphysical Velvet Room.

=== Plot ===
==== Episode P4 ====
At midnight the day after the P-1 Grand Prix concludes, the TV in Yu's room suddenly starts airing the Midnight Channel, showing a promotion for the P-1 Climax and an image of Mitsuru, Aigis, Akihiko, and Fuuka crucified, with General Teddie announcing the world's end within one hour. A black out then occurs throughout Inaba and the whole town is surrounded by red fog. Naoto, who had recently learned about the previous Dark Hour which the Shadow Operatives previously involved as S.E.E.S. confirmed that the said incident has return. The Investigation Team starts facing Shadows that steal fragments of their enemies' Personas upon their defeat.

Yu, Yosuke, and Chie reach Yasogami and are approached by Sho, who announces himself as the culprit behind the P-1 Grand Prix and P-1 Climax. Tohru Adachi, whom they had believed to be imprisoned, also appears and give cryptic clues regarding Sho's intentions to them. At Tartarus, they once again encounter Sho and defeat him, but are overpowered by his other self, Minazuki. Minazuki reveals he has gathered enough Persona fragments to summon a malevolent entity that will destroy the world. Now reunited with their teammates and the Shadow Operatives, they pursue him through Tartarus, but are assaulted by a huge group of Shadows, forcing the group to let Yu confront Sho alone. At the top of the tower, Yu stops Sho from killing Adachi and fights Minazuki, emerging victorious. General Teddie, revealing himself to be Hi-no-Kagutsuchi, possesses Sho's body and fights Yu. With Adachi's help, they are able to kill Kagutsuchi. As Tartarus collapses, Elizabeth transports everyone to the TV World where Yu reunites with his friends who all set up to find a new path in their futures.

==== Episode P3 ====
In response for the return of Dark Hour at Inaba, the reserve members of the Shadow Operatives as well as Labrys all head to Inaba via helicopter (save for Junpei, who ends up at Inaba by accident). After separately meeting the members of Investigation Team and rescuing their captured friends, they encounter Sho, the culprit behind Labrys' hijacking, who goads them into fighting Shadows in order to gather their Persona fragments. It is also revealed that Sho used to be one of Ikutsuki's test subjects, living in isolation and growing to resent the entire world after Ikutsuki abandoned him. During one of the experiments to make him a Persona user like Strega by using a Plume of Dusk, similar to Aigis and Labrys, another personality was born within Sho, which he refers to as Minazuki. Minazuki claims to have been born to grant Sho's wish to create a world without bonds. Labrys reaches the top of the tower and fights Sho. After defeating Sho, Hi-no-Kagutsuchi proceeds to possesses Sho's body. Labrys is able to emerge victorious against Kagutsuchi. As Tartarus collapses, Margaret transports everyone into the TV World. Sho, who is also transported, asks if she really did defeat Kagutsuchi, which she confirms, and Sho acknowledges her strength. Labrys then tries to convince Sho to join the Shadow Operatives.

==== True Epilogue ====
After both scenarios are completed, a new chapter is unlocked, which follows the aftermath of Yu and Adachi defeating Kagutsuchi. As both Margaret and Elizabeth appear to witness the event, Sho is revealed to be alive but unable to sense Minazuki within him. He then reveals that after waking up from his coma, he discovered that Ikutsuki paid his medical expenses, leaving him with a large inheritance. Feeling lost due to only knowing how to fight, Sho eventually settled in Inaba, where he observed the Investigation Team solving the serial kidnapping/murder case in secret, believing that they might be able to understand him, only to give up. It was then that he was confronted by Hi-no-Kagutsuchi, who asked him if he wanted to destroy the world, and he agreed. Realizing Sho's only way to form bonds is by fighting, Yu starts a rivalry with him and both fight, revealing that Minazuki's persona has been passed down to Sho. After Sho's friendly departure, Margaret safely transports everyone out of the tower at Yu's request, and come to terms with Elizabeth's departure from the Velvet Room after trying to convince her to return. In the aftermath, the Investigation Team and the Shadow Operatives reunite at Junes, where they all bond together and celebrate their victory, while Yu and Labrys express their belief in Sho finding bonds of his own.

==== Episode Adachi ====
Adachi continues to undergo police questioning regarding his methods for the two murders in Inaba, but his interrogators still do not believe his account of his crimes. However, Sho brainwashes one of the interrogators into assaulting Adachi and forcing him back into the TV World. There, Sho coerces Adachi into aiding him in his plan to destroy the world through creating yet another Dark Hour at Inaba. Adachi outwardly agrees, but decides to sabotage him in order to honor his promise to the Investigation Team to follow society's rules, and subtly manipulates the Investigation Team towards defeating Sho. When the Persona fragments are collected, Adachi makes his move, betraying Sho. However, Minazuki brutally beats Adachi. Adachi is rescued by Yu, and he destroys Hi-no-Kagutsuchi with Yu's aid. Adachi then returns to his prison cell and is visited by his old friend Dojima the next day.

== Development ==
Persona 4 Arena Ultimax was co-developed by Persona series creator Atlus, and fighting game developer Arc System Works, featuring several returning staff. These included Persona series producer Katsura Hashino and director Kazuhisa Wada from Atlus; and producers Takumi Iguchiya and Toshimichi Mori, and director Seiji Fukumoto from the BlazBlue production unit. The new character designs were designed by Persona series artist Shigenori Soejima. The anime cutscenes were created by Capsule, a company previously known for their CGI support work on series including Space Dandy. While the original Arena was always planned as a standalone work, Wada wanted to leave the narrative open to a sequel that could both expand the narrative and improve on its gameplay mechanics. The success of Arena prompted a sequel to begin production.

Arena Ultimax was designed to neatly conclude the narrative of Arena. Based on feedback, the storyline was trimmed down to flow better, allowing for a higher narrative volume while communicating more story overall. Similar to earlier Persona 3 cast inclusions, the new Persona 3 characters were given redesigns reflecting their personal evolution leading up to the events of Arena Ultimax. For Yukari's outfit, Soejima drew from the costume designs of Phoenix Sentai Featherman, a fictional tokusatsu show that had a long history within the series. Junpei's baseball attire was one of many suggested concepts for his character, ranging from a guitarist to a formal suit related to his Shadow Operatives work. Ken's appearance as a high schooler was simple design, while his fighting style balanced with Koromaru was hard to finalize. The online lobby avatars used the chibi-style character models from Persona Q: Shadow of the Labyrinth, which was then in production at Atlus.

Discussing the gameplay, Fukumoto noted that much of their work went into rebalancing existing fighters based on feedback from Arena, flattening power levels to be fair rather than doing simple strength reductions. They also sought to properly balance new characters and make them engaging to play, which was particularly important with the range-based Yukari. Rise's inclusion was pleasing for Iguchiya, as he had wanted her as a playable character in the original Arena. Due to her support role and idol status in the series canon, her moveset was based around range and song-based magic. Atlus created the "battle design" for her Persona with these elements in mind. Minazuki was a notable character due to his lack of a Persona, with the team building his fighting style around his two personalities similar to the twin incarnations of Labrys in the original. Adachi had been a highly requested character for Arena, but for story reasons was unable to appear, so the development team had to put some thought into explaining his appearance in Arena Ultimax. Each character's Persona abilities were tailored to them based on fighting style and balance. Shadow characters built upon the twin Labrys characters from the original, while also being designed as similar to traditional fighting games. The fighting styles of Marie and Margaret were directly based on their storyline abilities, such as Margaret having access to multiple Persona types.

The music was composed by Atlus Sound Team member Atsushi Kitajoh, with oversight by series composer Shoji Meguro. The soundtrack used both original tracks and recycled tracks by Meguro from Persona 3 and Persona 4, with some tracks featured vocals by Yumi Kawamura and Shihoko Hirata, respectively. The opening theme "Break out of..." was performed by Hirata, with lyrics written by Lotus Juice, both returning from Persona 4. The ending theme "Today" was performed by Kawamura. All tracks were composed by Kitajoh aside from a remix of "The Battle for Everyone's Souls", created by Meguro.

== Release ==
The arcade version of Arena Ultimax was announced in September 2013 under its Japanese title Persona 4: The Ultimax Ultra Suplex Hold. It released for Taito Type X2 arcade models on November 28, 2013, with Atlus publishing the title's opening movie online the following day. The PlayStation 3 (PS3) port was announced in November alongside the mainline entry Persona 5, and fellow spin-off titles Persona Q: Shadow of the Labyrinth and Persona 4: Dancing All Night. Mastering of the console release was finished by June 2014, with production then focusing on DLC characters. It released as a PS3 exclusive on August 28, 2014. The arcade version was updated with characters from the initial console release in January 2015.

Its Western release for PS3 and Xbox 360, along with those of Persona Q and Dancing All Night were announced in February 2014. In North America, the title was published by Atlus USA. It was released on September 30, 2014. In Europe, it was published on November 21 by Sega and in Australia seven days later. Following the release of each version, it was supported with DLC, including the characters Adachi and his associated storyline, Margaret and Marie.

On December 9, 2021, a port of the game was announced for Nintendo Switch, PlayStation 4, and Windows at The Game Awards 2021, which was released on March 17, 2022. The port includes all previously released downloadable content, and the gameplay is based on the arcade version's last update. All iterations of the new port launched with online play using delay-based netcode similar to the previous versions of the game. However, the Steam and PlayStation 4 versions received support for rollback netcode via a patch released on August 5, 2022. The game's lobby mode was excluded from the Steam and Nintendo Switch versions in a similar fashion to its omission from the Xbox 360 port of the original release, only being made available as a feature in the PS4 version of the remaster. Additionally, the Steam version of the game released alongside a "Midnight Channel Collection" bundle that collects both Arena Ultimax and the PC version of Persona 4 Golden. The standalone game is also available at a discount to owners of the latter game on Steam.

=== Related media ===
A manga adaptation of the game was announced on February 25, 2015, via Persona Official Magazine issue #2015 February. It premiered in Dengeki Maoh magazine in spring 2015, and is illustrated by manga artist Rokuro Saito.

Persona 4 Arena Ultimax was adapted into a live stage play titled Persona 4 Ultimax Song Project and ran from July 6 to July 10, 2016, at Theater G Rosso. The play was written by Mio Inoue and directed by Shotaro Oku, featuring music by Meguro and Atsushi Kitajoh. The play was released on DVD on November 25, 2016.

Tohru Adachi and his moveset from this game were converted for use in BlazBlue: Cross Tag Battle, a cross-over with the BlazBlue franchise and various other franchises developed by Arc System Works. Various other characters movesets also borrow minor elements from their appearances in this game, though they are primarily based on their respective versions from the original Persona 4 Arena.

== Reception ==
Reception

Aggregate score
| Aggregator | Score |
|---|---|
| Metacritic | PS3: 84/100; X360: 85/100; PC: 77/100; PS4: 80/100; NS: 81/100 |

Review scores
| Publication | Score |
|---|---|
| Destructoid | 9.0/10 |
| Eurogamer | 9/10 |
| Famitsu | 35/40 |
| Game Informer | 8.5/10 |
| GameRevolution | 8/10 |
| GameSpot | 8/10 |
| GameTrailers | 8.8/10 |
| Hardcore Gamer | PS3: 4/5; PS4: 4/5 |
| IGN | 9.1/10 |
| Joystiq | 4/5 |
| Nintendo Life | 7/10 |
| Nintendo World Report | 8.5/10 |
| PlayStation Official Magazine – Australia | 80% |
| Play | 92% |
| RPGFan | 93% |
| Shacknews | 8/10 |
| TouchArcade | 4/5 |
| USgamer | 4/5 |
| VentureBeat | 85/100 |
| Slant Magazine | 4.5/5 |

Persona 4 Arena Ultimax received "generally favorable" reviews according to review aggregator platform Metacritic.

IGN complimented the changes to the fighting system, graphics, rebalanced characters, and declared that there was "even more nuance for intermediate and advanced players" and that Ultimax was "100% the sequel that Persona 4 Arena deserved." Hardcore Gamer gave the game a 4/5, saying, "In terms of fighting mechanics, Persona 4 Arena Ultimax doesn't go leaps and bounds past its predecessor, but allows for growth that helps strengthen the experience." Ben Moore at GameTrailers stated that "practically everything new in Ultimax is outstanding and the core it's built on is just as robust and exhilarating as it was two years ago." Slant Magazine wrote that Ultimax "not only refines (and sometimes rebalances) the gameplay from Persona 4 Arena, but vastly expands it" and that the Shadow versions of the characters add "new layers without upsetting or unbalancing any of the foundational gameplay." The balance was also praised by Eurogamer.es. PlayStation Official Magazine – Australia said that "There's not even the slightest whiff of cash-in here. Greatly expanded and built upon." Play summarized the game as, "The combat remains some of the best and most intricate Arc System Works has composed to date."

The game sold a total of 89,000 units in Japan during its first week of release, topping charts. By May 2015, the game had sold 280,000 units worldwide.
