= Anna Graves =

American actress

- Born: Anna Desiree Godwin; May 12, 1978 (age 48); Memphis, Tennessee, United States
- Occupation: Voice actress
- Years active: 2001–present
- Known for: Star Wars: The Clone Wars
- Website: https://www.annagraves.com/

Anna Graves is an American voice actress best known for her voice-over work on multiple video games and commercials, along with her work on the animated series Star Wars: The Clone Wars.

== Star Wars ==
In 2010, Graves began voicing Duchess Satine Kryze, the pacifist leader of Mandalore and Obi-Wan Kenobi's love interest in Star Wars: The Clone Wars. Graves based her performance off of Cate Blanchett's role as Queen Elizabeth in Elizabeth as well as Carrie Fisher's role as Princess Leia Organa in Star Wars. Graves is a lifelong Star Wars fan. She would later voice Leia in the 2015 video game Disney Infinity 3.0.

== Filmography ==
=== Television ===
Year	Title	Role	Notes	Source
2007	Two and a Half Men	Flight Attendant (voice)	Ep. "City of Great Racks"	
2010–14	Star Wars: The Clone Wars	Satine Kryze, Sugi, Rumi, Senator Meena Tills, Tiplar, Tiplee, Teckla Minnau, Kin Robb		
2013	Teenage Mutant Ninja Turtles	Celestial	Ep. "New Girl in Town"	
2016–17	Star Wars Rebels	Nightsister Ghost Sabine, Phoenix Four "Cleat"	Eps. "Visions and Voices", "Rebel Assault"	
2017	Big Mouth	Mrs. Albert	Ep. "Sleepover: A Harrowing Ordeal of Emotional Brutality"	
2018	Voltron: Legendary Defender	Ina Leifsdottir, Lance's Mother		
2024	Star Wars: Tales of the Empire	Attendant #2	Ep. "The Way Out"	

=== Video games ===
Year	Title	Role	Notes	Source
2004	World of Warcraft	Additional Voices		
2006	Heroes of Might and Magic V	Isabel		
2007	Call of Duty 4: Modern Warfare	Helicopter Pilot, Reporter		
2007	Cars Mater-National Championship	Tia		
2007	The Golden Compass	Bolvangar Nurse, Witch, Trollesund		
2008	Lost: Via Domus	Lisa Gellhorn		
2008	Persona 4	Naoto Shirogane	English dub Uncredited	
2009	X-Men Origins: Wolverine	Raven Darkhölme, Carol Frost, Staff Flight #1		
2009	Infamous	Female Pedestrian		
2009	Wolfenstein	Caroline Becker, Nurse, Assassin		
2009	Bolt	Additional Voices		
2009	Call of Duty: Modern Warfare 2	Additional Voice Talent, Russian Woman Passengers in Zakhaev International Airport		
2009	James Cameron's Avatar: The Game	RDA		
2010	BioShock 2	Naledi Atkins, Multiplayer		
2010	Command & Conquer 4: Tiberian Twilight	Zone Defender		
2010	Singularity	Additional Voices		
2010	Mafia II	Civilians		
2011	Dungeon Siege III	Rajani, Additional Voices		
2011	Call of Duty: Modern Warfare 3	Alena Vorshevsky, Additional Voices		
2011	Saints Row: The Third	Additional Voices		
2012	Diablo III	Demon Hunter (Female)		
2012	The Amazing Spider-Man	Additional Voices		
2012	Ice Age: Continental Drift - Arctic Games	Shira		
2012	Guild Wars 2	Amanda, Briabrielle		
2012	XCOM: Enemy Unknown	Soldier		
2012	Dishonored	The Boyle Sisters, Weeper		
2012	Ratchet & Clank: Full Frontal Assault	Mrs. Zurgo, Base Computer		
2012	Persona 4 Golden	Naoto Shirogane	English dub Uncredited	
2012	Persona 4 Arena	Naoto Shirogane	English dub Uncredited	
2012	World of Warcraft: Mists of Pandaria	Additional Voices		
2013	Metro: Last Light	Anna		
2013	The Bureau: XCOM Declassified	Julia Carter, Additional Voices		
2013	Lightning Returns: Final Fantasy XIII	Additional Voices		
2014	Hearthstone	Additional Voices		
2015	Evolve	Additional Voices		
2015	Massive Chalice	Female Chalice		
2015	Disney Infinity 3.0	Princess Leia Organa		
2015	StarCraft II: Legacy of the Void	Dominion Officer		
2016	StarCraft II: Nova Covert Ops	Additional Voices		
2016	World of Warcraft: Legion	Additional Voices		
2016	Call of Duty: Modern Warfare Remastered	Helicopter Pilot, Reporter		
2017	Halo Wars 2	Additional Voices		
2018	Epic Seven	Luna (Limited Summon Character), Kise		
2019	Metro Exodus	Anna		
2019	Jumanji: The Video Game	Ruby Roundhouse		
2020	Maneater	Female Dispatcher		
2020	Marvel's Avengers	Sarah Garza, Additional Voices		
2023	Jumanji: Wild Adventures	Ruby Roundhouse		
2024	Harry Potter: Quidditch Champions	Rita Skeeter		
