= Mahō Shōjo o Wasurenai =

Japanese light novel

- Cover of the light novel

魔法少女を忘れない
- Genre: Coming-of-age, fantasy
- Light novel
- Written by: Yasuyuki Shinana
- Illustrated by: Hagu Koshijima
- Published by: Shueisha
- Imprint: Super Dash Bunko
- Published: June 25, 2009
- Live-action film
- Directed by: Teiichi Hori
- Written by: Futoshi Nakano; Takuya Masumoto
- Music by: Kōki Itō
- Studio: Spotted Productions
- Released: April 23, 2011
- Runtime: 90 minutes

Mahō Shōjo o Wasurenai (Japanese: 魔法少女を忘れない; lit. "I Won't Forget the Magical Girl") is a Japanese light novel by Yasuyuki Shinana and illustrated by Hagu Koshijima. The light novel was released on June 25, 2009. A live-action film adaptation was released on April 23, 2011.

== Plot ==
Half a year ago, high school student Yūya was introduced to Mirai, his younger sister. Yūya knows very little about Mirai other than the fact that she used to be a magical girl. He watches over Mirai in place of their busy single mother, and the more Yūya gets to know Mirai, the more his boring life seems to change. However, Mirai eventually reveals that as a result of losing her magical powers, people will soon lose their memories of her.

== Characters ==
Yūya Kitaoka (北岡 悠也, Kitaoka Yūya)
Portrayed by: Ryuki Takahashi
Yūya is a high school student who considers his life to be dull.
Mirai Kitaoka (北岡 みらい, Kitaoka Mirai)
Portrayed by: Risa Taniuchi
Mirai is a former magical girl who can no longer use magic and other people are no longer able to remember who she is.
Chika Sasaki (佐々木千花, Sasaki Chika)
Portrayed by: Suzuka Morita
Chika is Yūya's childhood friend who secretly is in love with him.
Naoki Oda (小田 直樹, Oda Naoki)
Portrayed by: Masahiro Usui
Naoki is Yūya's classmate who dreams of becoming a musician and is in love with Mirai.

== Media ==
=== Light novel ===
Mahō Shōjo o Wasurenai is written by Yasuyuki Shinana and illustrated by Hagu Koshijima. It was published by Shueisha under the Super Dash Bunko imprint.

No.	Japanese release date	Japanese ISBN
1	June 25, 2009	978-4-08-630491-7

=== Film ===
A live-action film adaptation was released on April 23, 2011, starring D-Boys member Ryuki Takahashi, Risa Taniuchi, Idoling!!! member Suzuka Morita, and D-Boys member Masahiro Usui. It was directed by Teiichi Hori. The film's theme song is "Kimi ga Ita Shirushi" by Jurian Beat Crisis. Filming took place in Fukuoka and lasted for two weeks.

== Reception ==
For the live-action adaptation, Real Live reviewed the film favorably, commenting how the director, Teiichi Hori, is able to "replicate" the "sweet and sour youth" from light novels.
