= Juria Kawakami =

Japanese actress and former singer (born 1993)

- 川上 ジュリア
- Born: Juria Kawakami (川上 朱莉杏, Kawakami Juria); December 13, 1993 (age 32); Hokkaidō, Japan
- Other name: Jurian Beat Crisis
- Occupation: Actress
- Years active: 2009–present
- Musical career
- Genres: Rock
- Instrument: Vocals
- Label: Avex Trax
- Website: avexnet.or.jp/juribe

Juria Kawakami (川上 ジュリア, Kawakami Juria; born December 13, 1993) is a Japanese actress and former singer. After starting out as a child actress, in 2009, she debuted as the lead vocalist of the solo music project Jurian Beat Crisis with the song "Go! Let's Go!" Throughout her music career, Kawakami's music was targeted towards high school students, and she was appointed the cheering manager of the 2011 Japanese High School Baseball Championship, with her first physical single, "Zutto Koko kara", released as the event's official theme song.

In 2012, Kawakami resumed her acting career and focused on it full-time after the release of her second album, Sotsugyō: Glorious Days. Notable roles include Ayaka Suzuki in Akuryō Byōtō and Marina Shinagawa in Mischievous Kiss 2: Love in Tokyo. In addition, Kawakami has appeared in multiple stage plays, such as Naoto Shirogane in VisuaLive Persona 4: The Evolution, Saki Yamagishi in One Week Friends, Narukami in Kamisama Hajimemashita: The Musical, and Ms. Accord in Puyo Puyo On Stage.

== Early life ==
Juria Kawakami was born and raised in Hokkaidō, Japan. At an early age, she was extremely shy. Worried about this, her mother urged her to take singing and dancing lessons. Soon she became very interested in singing, and her shyness was "cured."

== Career ==
=== 2009-2012: Jurian Beat Crisis ===
Jurian Beat Crisis "Go! Let's Go!" (2009)
A 25-second sample of Jurian Beat Crisis's debut single "Go Let's Go!"

Early in her career, Kawakami was part of the Hokkaido branch of Actors Studio as an actress. In 2005, Kawakami auditioned for A-Motion '05, an audition held by Avex Group, but did not pass the second round. She auditioned again in the following year at A-Motion '06, performing the song "Soba Kasu" by Judy and Mary and winning the Grand Prix out of 10,000 contestants.

In 2009, Kawakami debuted as Jurian Beat Crisis, with plans of releasing a digital single every month over the course of one year. All 12 songs to be released were composed by Jun Sky Walker(s) guitarist Junta Mori, with Lindberg members Maki Watase writing the lyrics and Tatsuya Hirokawa arranging the songs. Jurian Beat Crisis was marketed as a solo music project, of which Kawakami was its lead singer. Jurian Beat Crisis was also marketed to high school students, as Kawakami herself was a high school student and the lyrics of her songs were written from a high school student's perspective. To promote Jurian Beat Crisis's debut, Kawakami was featured in her own television program titled Juribe Channel on Fuji TV 2, and a column titled Juria's Banana Days was serialized in Seventeen.

On August 27, 2009, Jurian Beat Crisis made her debut performance at A-Nation '09 with the song "Go! Let's Go!" The song was later released digitally on September 2, 2009. "Go! Let's Go!" was used in commercials for the Bourbon Petit Series for the month of July prior to its release. On October 21, 2009, Jurian Beat Crisis released her second single, "Hurricane Love", digitally, which was used as the ending theme song for the variety show Oto no Moto for the month of October. Kawakami described the song as the "moment when appearing in front of a rival in love", where she hopes that the song will inspire self-confidence during times when one is "feeling ready to lose because the female rival is very cute." Jurian Beat Crisis's third digital single, "Lonely Flight", was released on November 11, 2009, which was then followed by her fourth digital single, "Aitai yo... Love You", on December 9, 2009.

Jurian Beat Crisis's fifth digital single, "Flying Rabbit", was released on January 27, 2010. Her sixth single, "Sakura Mau", was released digitally on February 17, 2010, with its music video directed by Yukihiko Tsutsumi. She then released "Mō Ichido..." on March 17, 2010. On April 7, 2010, Jurian Beat Crisis released her eighth digital single, "Brightest Way", as the theme song to the television drama Geki Koi: Unmei no Love Story. She then released "Soda Aji no Kiss" on May 19, "Namida no Naka Kimi o Mitsuketa" on June 16, and "Heart no Bakudan" on July 7, and "Ima Sugu Kiss Me" on August 11. Her debut physical album, self-titled Jurian Beat Crisis, was released on September 1, 2010, compiling all of her 12 monthly digital singles.

After the release of her first album, Jurian Beat Crisis began writing the lyrics to her songs. In April 2011, Jurian Beat Crisis released the song "Kimi ga Ita Shirushi" digitally, as the theme song to the film adaptation of Mahō Shōjo o Wasurenai. On June 7, 2011, Kawakami was appointed as the cheering manager for the 2011 Japanese High School Baseball Championship, releasing the song "Zutto Koko kara" as the event's official theme song. The song was released as her first physical single on August 10, 2011, with it pre-released digitally on July 20, 2011.

On February 1, 2012, Jurian Beat Crisis released her second physical single, "Sakura Namida", as the theme song for the film Shodō Girls!! Watashi-tachi no Kōshien. The music video features the main cast for the film, credited as the Matsuyama Girls High School Calligraphy Girls. On March 7, 2012, Jurian Beat Crisis released her second album, Sotsugyō: Glorious Days, which had a "graduation" theme, as Kawakami herself was graduating from high school during that time. The lyrics to all songs were written by Kawakami, who stated that the songs were meant to give a "positive" outlook for graduates and as a memorable event for people who have already graduated. The lyrics to "Fuzzy Glider", one of the original songs on the album, were based on Kawakami's own experiences of self-contemplation, where she conveys to the listener not to take things seriously.

=== 2012-present: Acting career ===
In 2012, Kawakami appeared in the stage play Holstein Killer Never Die!! as Asuka Yamashiro in April, Musical: Dream High as Yoon Baek-hee in July, Naoto Shirogane in VisuaLive Persona 4: The Evolution in October. In 2013, Kawakami was cast as Ayaka Suzuki in Akuryō Byōtō. In 2014, she was cast as Marina Shinagawa in Mischievous Kiss 2: Love in Tokyo and starred as Saki Yamagishi in the stage production of One Week Friends. In 2015, she portrayed Narukami in Kamisama Hajimemashita: The Musical and Ms. Accord in Puyo Puyo On Stage.

== Discography ==
All songs were released under the name Jurian Beat Crisis.

=== Studio albums ===
List of studio albums, with selected chart positions, sales figures and certifications
Title	Year	Album details	Peak chart positions	Sales
Title	Year	Album details	JPN	Sales
Jurian Beat Crisis	2010	Released: September 1, 2010; Label: Avex Trax; Formats: CD	47	—
Sotsugyō: Glorious Day (卒業 -Glorious day-)	2012	Released: March 7, 2012; Label: Avex Trax; Formats: CD	124	—
"—" denotes releases that did not chart or were not released in that region.

=== Singles ===
List of singles, with selected chart positions, sales figures and certifications
Title	Year	Peak chart positions	Sales	Album
Title	Year	JPN	Sales	Album
"Zutto Koko kara" (ずっとここから)	2011	23	—	Sotsugyō: Glorious Day
"Sakura Namida" (桜涙) (with Matsuyama Girls High School Calligraphy Girls)	2012	74	—	Sotsugyō: Glorious Day
"—" denotes releases that did not chart or were not released in that region.

==== Promotional singles ====
List of singles, with selected chart positions, sales figures and certifications
Title	Year	Peak chart positions	Sales	Album
Title	Year	JPN	Sales	Album
"Go! Let's Go!"	2009	—	—	Jurian Beat Crisis
"Hurricane Love" (ハリケーン☆ラブ)	2009	—	—	Jurian Beat Crisis
"Lonely Flight"	2009	—	—	Jurian Beat Crisis
"Aitai yo... Love You" (逢いたいよ... love you)	2009	—	—	Jurian Beat Crisis
"Flying Rabbit" (フライング・ラビット)	2010	—	—	Jurian Beat Crisis
"Sakura Mau" (サクラ舞う)	2010	—	—	Jurian Beat Crisis
"Mō Ichido..." (もう一度...)	2010	—	—	Jurian Beat Crisis
"Brightest Way"	2010	—	—	Jurian Beat Crisis
"Soda Aji no Kiss" (ソーダ味のKiss)	2010	—	—	Jurian Beat Crisis
"Namida no Naka Kimi o Mitsuketa" (ナミダの中キミをみつけた)	2010	—	—	Jurian Beat Crisis
"Heart no Bakudan" (ハートの爆弾)	2010	—	—	Jurian Beat Crisis
"Ima Sugu Kiss Me" (今すぐKiss Me)	2010	—	—	Jurian Beat Crisis
"Kimi to Ita Akashi" (キミといた証)	2011	—	—	Sotsugyō: Glorious Day
"—" denotes releases that did not chart or were not released in that region.

== Filmography ==
=== Television ===
Year	Title	Role	Network	Notes
2003	Inochi no Iro Enpitsu	Rika Mukai	TV Asahi	
2009	Juribe Channel	Herself	Fuji TV 2	
2013	Akuryō Byōtō	Ayaka Suzuki	MBS, TBS	Supporting role
2014	Mischievous Kiss 2: Love in Tokyo	Marina Shinagawa	Fuji TV	Supporting role

=== Theatre ===
Year	Title	Role	Notes
2012	Holstein Killer Never Die!!	Asuka Yamashiro	
2012	Musical: Dream High	Yoon Baek-hee	
2012	VisuaLive Persona 4: The Evolution	Naoto Shirogane	
2014	One Week Friends	Saki Yamagishi	
2015	Kamisama Hajimemashita: The Musical	Narukami	
2015	Puyo Puyo On Stage	Ms. Accord	
