= Persona 4 Arena =

2012 video game

- Cover for the console versions
- Developers: Arc System Works; P-Studio
- Publishers: JP: Atlus; NA: Sega; EU: Zen United
- Directors: Kazuhisa Wada; Takumi Iguchiya
- Producers: Katsura Hashino; Toshimichi Mori
- Designer: Naoki Sawakawa
- Artists: Shigenori Soejima; Hanako Oribe
- Writer: Teppei Kobayashi
- Composer: Atsushi Kitajoh
- Series: Persona
- Platforms: Arcade; PlayStation 3; Xbox 360
- Release: Arcade: JP: March 1, 2012; PlayStation 3, Xbox 360: JP: July 26, 2012; NA: August 7, 2012; EU: May 10, 2013
- Genre: Fighting
- Modes: Single-player, multiplayer
- Arcade system: Taito Type X2

Persona 4 Arena (Note: Persona 4: The Ultimate in Mayonaka Arena (Japanese: ペルソナ4 ジ・アルティメット イン マヨナカアリーナ, Hepburn: Perusona Fō: Ji Arutimetto In Mayonaka Arīna)) is a 2012 fighting video game co-developed by Arc System Works and P-Studio and published by Atlus for arcades, PlayStation 3, and Xbox 360; the game is a spin-off from the Persona series, itself part of the larger Megami Tensei franchise. Gameplay follows standard fighting game conventions, with matches between two characters with individual movesets, and special expendable abilities. The storyline is told through visual novel segments.

Persona 4 Arena is set two months after the events of Persona 4, and two years after its predecessor Persona 3. The Investigation Team of Persona 4 is drawn into a new mystery involving the P-1 Grand Prix, a fighting tournament within the Midnight Channel dimension that pits the Investigation Team against the Shadow Operatives, a group formed by the surviving SEES of Persona 3. The groups must work together to solve the mysteries behind the P-1 Grand Prix and Labrys, a humanoid robot discovered by the Shadow Operatives. The story is directly continued with Persona 4 Arena Ultimax.

Persona 4 Arena was the first title in the Persona series outside the role-playing genre. Development of Arena began in 2010 after Atlus approached the company to collaborate on a fighting game based on Persona 4. Reviews for the game were positive, with critics praising the gameplay and graphics employed, with criticism going towards the short length of the story mode. The success of Arena and its sequel prompted the development of further spin-off titles, including a direct sequel, Persona 4 Arena Ultimax, and other games, such as Persona 4: Dancing All Night.

== Gameplay ==
Yosuke Hanamura attacks Yu Narukami using a Persona Attack. The bars in the bottom indicate the amount of remaining energy they currently possess, which is needed to perform special attacks.

Persona 4 Arena is a fighting video game in which players take the role of 13 characters from Persona 4 and its predecessor Persona 3. The game is divided between several modes; the single-player-exclusive Story mode which has fights scattered between long visual novel segments, Training mode which acts as a tutorial, Challenge mode featuring fights against selected characters, the original Arcade mode that features three-round ranked fights and truncated story segments, and a Score Attack mode where players fight strengthened opponents to raise their score. Players can also fight each other in matches through local and online multiplayer.

Gameplay in fights has two characters fighting each other on a 2D plane in a themed arena. Actions are divided between four buttons, with two being assigned to light and heavy attacks. While characters are able to perform attacks on their own, they are also able to call their Personas to assist them during battles. Should the Persona be attacked by the opponent, the player will lose a blue card situated below the health bar. Following four attacks, the player will be unable to use Persona for a short time. There are also status ailments which can be inflicted on opponents, such as stunning them to slow or halt movement, and poisoning them to reduce health.

Through specific button combinations, characters are able to perform a series of special attacks as well as defend themselves for a prolonged time. The strongest attack is the "Instant Kill" which can immediately defeat the opponent if the attack connects. These techniques are limited as a result of using the "SP Gauge" which is at the bottom of the screen in the form of blue bars. When the character has low life left, they enter into the "Awakening State" that refills the SP Gauge and increases the character's defence. Below the life bar there is the Burst Gauge which gives access to other forms of the Persona Attacks as well as refill the SP Gauge depending on how it is used. When first starting the game, only four character campaigns are available, requiring the player to complete them to unlock more.

== Synopsis ==
=== Setting and characters ===
Persona 4 Arena takes place in the Persona universe, revolving around groups of people who harness Personas—physical manifestations of their inner psyche—and use them to fight rogue psyches born from humanity's collective unconsciousness called Shadows. Arena is set two months after the events of Persona 4, and three years after its predecessor Persona 3. The location is the rural town of Inaba, the main setting of Persona 4. A key location in the story is the TV World, a metaphysical realm influenced by the wills of Inaba's population.

The story is split into two parallel narratives following the Investigation Team of Persona 4 (Yu Narukami, Yosuke Hanamura, Chie Satonaka, Yukiko Amagi, Kanji Tatsumi, Rise Kujikawa, Naoto Shirogane, and Teddie), a group of friends who investigated a serial murder case involving the TV World; and the Shadow Operatives (Aigis, Mitsuru Kirijo, and Akihiko Sanada), a covert group formed by former SEES members from Persona 3 to fight Shadows. Elizabeth, an attendant of the otherworldly space known as the Velvet Room, is also drawn into the conflict. The main protagonists of Persona 4 Arena are Persona 4 protagonist Yu Narukami—a character blessed with the "Wild Card" power to summon multiple Personas; and new character Labrys, an Anti-Shadow weapon used by the Shadow Operatives.

=== Story ===
As Yu Narukami returns to Inaba for Golden Week, he and his friends, Yosuke Hanamura, Chie Satonaka and Yukiko Amagi, witness a commercial on the Midnight Channel for a fighting tournament, the "P-1 Grand Prix", seemingly hosted by another of their friends, Teddie. The tournament not only involves them, but also their companions Kanji Tatsumi, Naoto Shirogane, and Rise Kujikawa. With their friends Rise, Kanji and Teddie missing, and Naoto absent, the remaining members decide to reassemble the Investigation Team and search for answers.

The following day, they enter the TV World, only to find themselves separated and stuck in a place resembling Yasogami High School (though, in Kanji's case, he accidentally fell into the TV World earlier and believes the tournament is a dream).

Meanwhile, former members of SEES, Mitsuru Kirijo, Akihiko Senada, and Aigis, now part of the Shadow Operatives (an organization formed after the events of Persona 3 FES that battles Shadows), track one of their Anti-Shadow weapons, Labrys, that went missing when Mitsuru's plane was hijacked, to Yasoinaba and enter the TV World; they are joined by Naoto, who is in close pursuit, having been hired by public safety to spy on the Kirijo group. As a result, they become involved in the P-1 Grand Prix as well.

During the tournament, both groups are forced to fight each other, while an impersonator of Teddie, named General Teddie, acts as the host, and an impersonator of Rise provides commentary for the fights (subsequently, the real Teddie and Rise were trapped inside the TV World prior to the tournament). The participants also meet a mysterious girl without a Persona, that has entered the TV World and claims to be the student council president of Yasogami High. They suspect her Shadow is responsible for the tournament. Additionally, an unknown entity starts tricking fighters into believing it is their Shadows. Furthermore, during the fights, Yu and Aigis meet a woman named Elizabeth, who wishes to test their skills with the ability known as the Wild Card, in order to obtain a new power.

After defeating all the opponents, the groups learn that the mysterious girl is, in fact, Labrys, and that General Teddie is Labrys' Shadow in disguise. It is revealed that she was forced to fight other models of her series at the Kirijo Ergonomics lab, but grew close to one of her sisters, only to be forced to destroy her, too. As a result, she escaped the lab, but was later recaptured and sealed away. After being abducted from Mitsuru's plane, Labrys was tossed into the TV World, and brainwashed into thinking that she was human. Her dungeon in the TV World took the form of Yasogami High, and she adopted a false personality based on that of an unknown girl in her memories; her Shadow, meanwhile, was formed by both her desire to be understood and accepted as a normal girl, and the trauma suffered from being forced to kill her fellow Anti-Shadow weapons. Labrys' Shadow created the tournament to make others feel what she felt. Upon Shadow Labrys' defeat, Labrys accepts her Shadow, which turns into the Persona, Ariadne.

The final part of the storyline, titled "Cliffhanger", starts after the defeat of Shadow Labrys in the tournament. As the Investigation Team and Shadow Operatives converge and prepare to leave, the true mastermind behind the events prior to the tournament takes control of Labrys to attack everyone. The mastermind reveals they have been working with the entity imitating the Persona users' Shadows, to weaken them mentally, so that their Personas would revert to Shadows. Upon their defeat, Labrys is freed, though they ultimately escape. Before going back to investigate the culprit, Mitsuru tells the Investigation Team group to forget about everything. Labrys decides to join Mitsuru's group, while Aigis offers to help Labrys search for the girl in her memories. After the Shadow Operatives depart, Yu also reveals his intentions, that the Investigation Team should continue working towards the same goal as Mitsuru.

== Development ==
Atlus staff member Kazuhisa Wada had long wanted to branch the Persona series out into other genres besides role-playing so as to reach a wider audience. This wish was shared by series producer Katsura Hashino and character designer Shigenori Soejima, and the three came up with a draft for a fighting game spin-off due to their mutual liking for the genre. The team chose to contact Arc System Works, developers of the BlazBlue fighting game series, due to their similar work ethics and proficiency in developing for the fighting genre. Mori was shocked when Atlus first approached them, and they were highly motivated during development as many staff members were fans of the Persona series. Rather than Arc System Works developing the game in isolation, Atlus requested that the two studios co-develop the game. Arc System Works director Takumi Iguchiya worked closely with the Persona team on the project.

Production began in 2010. Arena was the Persona team's first collaboration with another studio over a game. During earlier discussions, Iguchi assumed it was a small-scale production focusing on the characters, but Hashino and Wada's enthusiasm changed his mind. The original music was composed by Atsushi Kitajoh. Stage themes were based on original themes by series composer Shoji Meguro, with vocals for some tracks by Shoko Hirata. The opening theme was performed by Yumi Kawamura, the main vocalist of Persona 3. While the gameplay was managed by Arc System Works, the Persona team handled the game's scenario and visual design. While designing the gameplay, the team worked to incorporate elements of the role-playing original, ranging from character moves to status effects. During development, Mori asked Atlus whether they could include non-playable characters such as Nanako and Ryotaro Dojima in the roster, but their requests were firmly declined. Mori speculated that it was because of their relative obscurity compared to the main cast.

The story was designed from the outset as a canonical sequel to Persona 4. The game's script was primarily written by Teppei Kobayashi. Wada created the basic scenario draft, which was challenging for him due to both the genre differences and fan expectations. The scenario was managed by Yuichiro Tanaka. Tanaka also supervised the spin-off novel Persona x Detective Naoto, and references to the novel were included in the scenario of Arena. The character of Labrys was originally mentioned in an earlier Persona 3 audio drama. To help distinguish the character, Labrys was given a Kansai accent in the Japanese version.

Soejima returned to design the new characters. The game presented a number of firsts for Soejima's style, including drawing characters with damaged clothing and in energetic poses. Soejima helped design key art, though another artist Hanako Oribe also contributed to the artwork including the cover illustration. She had previously worked on supporting artwork for a number of Megami Tensei titles. Arc System Works were constantly adjusting the background designs based on Atlus's instructions, resulting in them taking twice as long to develop as their other titles. The cutscenes were animated by Madhouse. The studio were brought in after their work on the opening of Persona 4 Golden, which impressed Atlus. The opening was designed to have a different tone to the opening of Persona 4 Golden, as Arena was a different genre.

== Release ==
Persona 4 Arena was first announced in August 2011 alongside Persona 4 Golden. The arcade version was set for release first in 2012, with PlayStation 3 and Xbox 360 versions following the same year. The arcade version began distribution in Japan on March 1, 2012. It was released for Taito Type X2 arcade models. Originally scheduled for console release in August, the date was changed to July 26.

The game was localised for the West by Atlus USA. It had the same team as the mainline Persona series, led by Yu Namba. Namba supervised the whole process, and according to him they focused more on being consistent with the narrative localizion than appealing to a particular player demographic. The Western title was considerably shorter than its Japanese one, as the team thought it sounded "awkward". The game also dropped the "Shin Megami Tensei" moniker used for Persona 4 and other Megami Tensei titles as it made the title too long. For the localization, Atlus USA did its best to bring in all the original voice cast, but due to what they described as "unspecified circumstances", the team decided to recast a couple of roles. These were the characters Teddie, with Sam Riegel replacing Dave Wittenberg due to scheduling conflicts; and Chie, where Erin Fitzgerald replaced Tracey Rooney after the latter decided to decline the role when Atlus offered it to her again.

A North American release of the console versions. was announced in February 2012. The game released in North America on August 7, 2012. The PS3 version was region locked, the second game for the console to have this feature. According to Atlus, this was done due to price differences between regions potentially affecting sales. Despite the region locking, online servers remained global.

A European release was announced in May 2012. Due to lacking a branch in the region, Atlus went through a third-party publisher; in this case, they partnered with Zen United. Originally scheduled for 2012, the game was substantially delayed. This was explained by Zen United as being due to testing and development due to regional differences related to the game's online elements. The game eventually released in the region on May 10, 2013. Standard and limited editions were released. The PS3 version was delisted by Sony at Zen United's request when digital publishing rights were returned to Atlus. The European version was eventually re-released by Atlus on the PlayStation Store.

== Reception ==
Reception

Aggregate score
Aggregator	Score
Metacritic	PS3: 86/100; X360: 83/100

Review scores
Publication	Score
Edge	8/10
Eurogamer	9/10
Famitsu	36/40
Game Informer	8.5/10
GameSpot	PS3: 8/10; X360: 7/10
GamesRadar+	4/5
IGN	9/10
Joystiq	4/5
Polygon	8/10

Japanese magazine Famitsu enjoyed the story mode, praising its volume and structure. Game Informer's Jason Oestreicher said that the story would be a "treat" for fans of Persona 3 and Persona 4, Eurogamer's Matt Edwards favourably compared the writing to the mainline Persona games despite noting its slow pace, and Edge positively noted the story mode's use of the thirteen-character roster and its alternate interweaving paths. Maxwell McGee of GameSpot said the narrative's presentation style "will quickly bore all but the most enthusiastic". GamesRadar's Lucas Sullivan enjoyed the extensive narrative, but noted that those who had not played Persona 4 would be spoiled on story events by the narrative of Arena. Vince Ingenito of IGN said that the narrative was "aimed squarely at fans of the series", and Joystiq's Jordan Mallory praised the game's treatment of its characters and evolution of its narrative after a clichéd opening. Phillip Kollar, writing for Polygon, felt that the story mode was enjoyable but that it dragged on with story segments up to half an hour long between fights.

The artwork and sprites were praised by Famitsu, who noted the smooth animations and anime cutscenes. Edwards praised the combination of 2D and 3D graphical elements, which he felt continued Arc System Works' legacy in game graphic design. Oestreicher echoed Edward's sentiments, calling the sprite graphics "a fresh take on an already slick style". McGee was highly positive about the sprite animations and art design, though found the visual novel segments dragged down the narrative despite their strong visual presentation. Sullivan called the sprite graphics "a feast for the eyes". Ingenito positively cited the graphics, and praised the soundtrack for combining elements from both Persona and previous Arc System Works games.

Famitsu praised the gameplay for its depth, incorporating of elements from the Persona series, and ease of use for newcomers. One reviewer found it overly similar to Arc System Works' other fighting games. Edwards praised the controls as being easier to use than earlier Arc System Works titles while retaining their distinctive style, while Edge summed up the battle system as "thoughtfully designed". Oestreicher, while finding the gameplay and modes enjoyable, felt that newcomers would struggle with the system. McGee generally enjoyed the gameplay and different modes, but found the tutorials lacking and noted some inconveniences when sorting matches. Sullivan lauded the roster balance, but felt that there was too much capacity for oversuing automatic combo attacks. Ingenito compared the game favorably to other Arc System Works titles, noting its inclusion of RPG mechanics. Mallory likewise praised the gameplay and general depth, though he felt the online mode lacked features. Kollar enjoyed playing through the various modes, praising the gameplay versatility and strategic depth. Its ease of play was lauded by some reviewers, while others said it was too intimidating or overwhelming for genre newcomers. The North American 360 version was criticised by multiple Western outlets due to performance issues in the online mode prior to a patch released by Atlus to address the issue.

=== Sales ===
During its debut week, the PS3 version of Arena reached second place in gaming charts, with sales of 128,485 units. The 360 version also reached the charts in eighteenth place, with sales of over 9,800 units. The game outsold all other fighting games available at the time, with both versions selling through over 90% of its initial shipments. According to Media Create's 2013 summary of 2012 game sales, the PS3 version had sold over 192,700 units, while the 360 version sold nearly 13,000. The game surpassed Atlus's sales projections, with official total sales reaching 220,000 units as of October 2012. Its success contributed to a positive fiscal year for Atlus's then-parent company Index Corporation.

=== Awards ===
Award	Category	Result	Ref.
Spike Video Game Awards	Best Fighting Game	Won	
National Academy of Video Game Trade Reviewers	Animation, Interactive	Nominated	
National Academy of Video Game Trade Reviewers	Game, Franchise Fighting	Nominated	
16th Annual D.I.C.E. Awards	Fighting Game of the Year	Nominated	

== Legacy ==
Although Arena was designed as a standalone project, Wada always anticipated continuing the narrative into a second game. Following the success of Arena, a sequel was greenlit with the same staff, with the aim being to expand the roster and improve gameplay based on feedback from the first game. Titled Persona 4 Arena Ultimax, the version released for Japanese arcades in 2013, and was published worldwide for PS3 and 360 in 2014 by Atlus and Sega.

A manga adaptation was published in Dengeki Maoh. The manga was authored by Aiyakyuu, who encountered scheduling problems during production of the manga's second volume. The manga was published in three volumes between May 2013 and February 2014. A Japanese stage play based on the game was performed between December 19 to December 23.

The success of Persona 4 Arena prompted Atlus to expand the Persona series with further spin-off titles; these included the dungeon crawler Persona Q: Shadow of the Labyrinth in 2013 and the rhythm game Persona 4: Dancing All Night in 2014. Both of these games were followed by sequels.
