= Naoto Shirogane =

- Persona character
- Naoto from Persona 4
- First appearance: Persona 4 (2008)
- Designed by: Shigenori Soejima
- Voiced by: English: Anna Graves (2008–2012) Valerie Arem (2014–2018) Amber Lee Connors (Revival); Japanese: Romi Park
- Portrayed by: Various: Juria Kawakami (Persona 4 stage play); Yuki Asakura (Persona 4 Arena & Persona 4 Arena Ultimax stage plays)

In-universe information
- Nationality: Japanese

Naoto Shirogane (Japanese: 白鐘 直斗, Hepburn: Shirogane Naoto) is a character in the role-playing game Persona 4. The character is a young woman who moves to Inaba in order to aid the police in investigating the ongoing serial-murder case. In an attempt to solve the murder case, Naoto uses herself as bait by appearing on TV and allowing herself to be kidnapped by the culprit. After facing her hidden feelings in the form of a "Shadow", Naoto obtains the power of a "Persona" which allows her to become a playable character alongside the rest of the cast. Naoto also can develop a bond with the protagonist though the whether or not it is intimate depends on the player's choices. The character has also appeared in the animated adaptations of Persona 4 as well as other spin-off games which use different genre rather than role-playing games.

Shigenori Soejima created Naoto under the direction of hiding her gender while also giving cues to the audience, lending a more feminine approach to her final design. While Naoto has been a popular character, there has been controversy over the nature of her gender identity not being fully explored through her social link.

== Conception and creation ==
Due to the second design draft having feminine influences, it was easily adjusted when it was decided to make Naoto a woman

Created for Persona 4 by character designer Shigenori Soejima, while Naoto's name and role as an investigator were established early on in development, the character's story was still being written during their drafting phase due to appearing late in the game's plot. When designing the characters for the game, Soejima wanted to emphasize his perception of "coolness" as an underlying theme. Naoto's first character draft was male, with a "big jerk" personality, however the development team felt Soejima had taken the jerk aspect too far so a second draft followed. This design softened the character into a "small cute boy" and "a short and pretty young man", aiming to make them more harmless, while their appearance took on a slightly feminine nature. However a suggestion was floated around the development team to make Naoto female instead, and Soejima quickly added some heels and eyelashes to his second draft.

Soejima wanted to hide the fact she was a woman from the viewer with this newer iteration of the character so it would be a surprise, and to this end used his second draft as the basis for her early attire, while creating a third more feminine draft for after the reveal, though this resulted in both designs being very similar. In the Japanese version, Naoto uses 'boku', a typically male pronoun, while interchangeably using he and she in the English version. The character's young age of sixteen also helped sell the masculine image, with efforts done to make her look even younger for her age including drawing her with less feminine facial features in her early promotional artworks. Despite these efforts, Soejima suspected players had surmised her gender early due to her tightened waist in these depictions. He considered Naoto one of his favorite characters from the game, and found her easy to draw. After the game's release and he felt players were more aware of her actual gender, he chose to draw her in a more feminine manner on subsequent media by emphasizing her breasts while focusing on her eyes, mouth and eyelashes.

=== Designs ===
Standing 152 centimeters (5 ft) tall, Naoto is a thin detective with short blue hair, wearing a stylized police uniform and hat. To help sell the look of "a young detective boy", Soejima gave her a distinctive hat towards the end of her development, with the brim angled downward to emphasize the detective concept. He felt her design was similar to the protagonist of Persona 3, with the key differences being the tips of her hair and eyelashes, adding "I guess you could say it's the kind of face I like." The character's build also was designed similarly to the aforementioned protagonist, due to the perception that "handsome, thin-framed, mysterious boys" tend to be popular characters.

When designing Naoto for Persona 4: Dancing All Night, designer Kazuhisa Wada depicted her dancing style as more feminine to show Naoto embracing her feminine side more. Her dancing style comes from house music, with Wada noting that this dance style had a certain degree of sex appeal. In the manga Persona x Detective her appearance changed significantly. Now 18, her hair is now significantly longer extending down her back with bangs on the front, and her attire changed to a gray business suit and tie. Naoto is voiced by Romi Park in all appearances in Japanese. In English, Naoto was voiced Anna Graves in the original Persona 4 as well as Persona 4 Arena and Persona 4 Golden, by Valerie Arem from Persona 4 Arena Ultimax to BlazBlue: Cross Tag Battle, and by Amber Lee Connors in Persona 4 Revival.

=== Related designs ===
Naoto's Shadow, an enemy representing a character's repressed feeling in the Persona setting that she must defeat to proceed, is a robotic version of her wielding ray guns, a jetpack and a glass hat revealing an electronic "brain". Her shadow is meant to represent both the fact she is not taken seriously due to her age, but also due to the frustration that because of her gender she perceives she cannot be like "the strong male role models she admires so much". Due to its appearance in the "Secret Laboratory" area of Persona 4, phrases such as "hidden base" and "surgical modification" were used as the basis for its design, while its robotic elements were intended as references to classic sentai shows and to give it an "old-school touch". Upon its defeat, it transforms into her Persona, an avatar projected from one's inner self that resemble mythological figures and represent the façades worn by individuals to face life's hardships,

Naoto's Persona starts as Sukunabikona, a reference to the mythological Japanese deity of the same name. Seojima incorporated visual elements of related Fairy tale Issun-bōshi into the design, and gave it a short height to match Naoto's diminutive stature to represent that "size doesn't determine all". The character's clothing was modeled after "young detective boys" found in early anime to help associate the imagery with Naoto herself, as Soejima saw such characters as "heroes who are easily captured by the enemy, yet manage to pull out the heroics in the end". Later on, her Persona transforms into Yamato Takeru, a reference to the historical figure of the same name due to the myth of him dressing as a housemaid to infiltrate an enemy encampment. Yamato's design was originally intended to incorporate noble or royal attire, but Soejima instead chose to reference the manga The Rose of Versailles, tying it into Naoto's identity as a "pretty crossdressing girl". In Persona 4 Golden, an enhanced version of Persona 4, Yamato can transform into Yamato Sumera Mikoto, which adds long flowing blonde hair and a red jacket to the previous design.

== Appearances ==
Naoto appears in Persona 4 and is a young woman trying to solve the murders in the game. Due to the gendered stereotypes of detectives and institutional misogyny in law enforcement, Naoto presents as a man in order to hide her sex. Correctly suspecting that initial suspect that the young Mitsuo Kubo is merely a copycat killer, Naoto uses herself as bait by appearing on TV and allowing herself to be kidnapped by the culprit. The main characters follow Naoto to the TV world, where Naoto is confronted by her opposite, the Shadow, who expresses their frustration with her birth sex and at being treated like a child by the police. Naoto explains after Shadow Naoto has been defeated due to the male-oriented nature of the police department, which is why she had been presenting as male. Once Naoto comes to understand her feelings, her Shadow turns into the Persona Sukuna-Hikona, a robotic humanoid wearing a blue suit jacket that has an insect-like head and butterfly-like wings.

Following Naoto's recovery from her time in the TV world, she joins the protagonists in finding the culprit, having gained clues about his method thanks to her kidnapping. Throughout Yu's interactions with Naoto, she regains her passion for being a detective. Depending on the player's actions, Naoto can become intimate with Yu. Naoto also decides that she is not a detective just to uphold her family tradition, but because she wants to be and thoroughly enjoy it no matter her gender or age. Her Persona then evolves into Yamato-Takeru, a humanoid in a white and blue traditional armed forces dress uniform with a more bird-like appearance. In the game's ending, Naoto decides to stay in Inaba, unsure what to do now that the case is closed.

Naoto appears as a playable character in Persona 4 Arena, where she is pursuing the character Mitsuru Kirijo from Persona 3. She once again appears in the sequel Persona 4 Arena Ultimax investigating the appearance of the TV World's fog in Inaba again and fighting for the culprit behind such chaos. She later appears in Persona 4: Dancing All Night.

A novel that takes place one year after Persona 4 was released starring Naoto called Persona 4 x Detective Naoto, where she is investigating the disappearance of her old friend Touko Aoi. This novel was made by Dengeki Bunko. A manga adaptation drawn by Satoshi Shiki ran in the monthly magazine Dengeki Maoh from 2012 until 2014.

== Critical reception ==
Naoto has received overall widespread positive reception, having been named as one of the best Persona characters. Geoff Thew of Hardcore Gamer found Naoto to be attractive due in part to her detective work. Andrew Clouther of GameZone expressed skepticism with how Naoto was being designed for Persona 4: Dancing All Night, feeling that Naoto depicted in a sexual light felt unlike her and expressed concern that it would be used to justify "fan-service." A swimsuit costume that Naoto wears in Dancing All Night was described as "conservative" by Matt Sainsbury of Digitally Downloaded, who felt it fit her character. Mike Cosimano regarded her as a great character due to her pragmatism and quality detective work. Izzatul Razali of IGN has claimed that Naoto is one of best female character in Persona, stating that "as the story develops, she definitely defies expectations and evolves into an impactful character and one of the best romantic options." Janine Hawkins of Paste Magazine has also praised her for her outfit, feeling that few could pull it off as well.

Naoto's gender identity has been subject to discussion by much of the audience as well as critics, and has been a source of controversy for Persona 4. She is canonically a woman, but her shadow makes reference to a body-modifying surgical procedure and crossing the barriers between sexes, seemingly as a reference to transgender surgery. Naoto struggles throughout the game, feeling repressed in her femininity as her interests in detective novels and science fiction were not typical for a young girl, picking up certain attitudes and making her feel as though being seen as a woman is not 'ideal' for her image as a detective. Notably, she does not react negatively when initially called a woman after her secret is revealed, and her voice grows more feminine when faced against her shadow. Her social link portrays her as curious and willing to embrace her womanhood and seeking out the encouragement of the protagonist, though shy. Vrai Kaiser of The Mary Sue was initially hoping to find a "kindred spirit" with Naoto, but grew upset when they discovered that this was not the case. Michael Higham of GameSpot felt that certain choices players could make regarding her gender identity were insensitive.

Carolyn Petit of GameSpot considered Naoto to be a trans man, but expressed disappointment that Persona 4 seemed to reject this idea. She criticized the reasoning for Naoto presenting male, feeling it "rang false" due to finding it unbelievable for someone to live as a different gender due to an attachment to fictional characters. She also took issue with characters changing their behavior towards Naoto, citing Yosuke flirting with her and characters explaining certain behaviors as being due to her gender as examples. Writer Mattie Brice found the depiction of Naoto to be transphobic, suggesting that the transgender character Erica Anderson from Catherine made this depiction questionable. Brice interpreted the scene between Naoto and her shadow as rejecting the need for gender reassignment surgery in order to be a man. Despite their issues with the character, they found her enjoyable. Carol Grant of Vice criticized Naoto, suggesting that the romance scenes were demeaning to Naoto's identity and expressing disappointment in how Naoto's gender identity is handled. Authors of the book Queerness in Play discuss how Naoto's gender expression and struggles with gender is used to teach players about the transgender experience. Comic Book Resource author Noelle Corbett noted that Naoto has been interpreted by players as a trans man or non-binary, and in that case Persona 4 "falls short of actual queer representation." However, she felt that the controversy overshadowed the "fairly progressive message" in Persona 4 over gender. She stated that, despite the interpretation, Naoto never indicates a desire to be anything other than a woman. She drew a comparison between her and women who have disguised themselves as men, including Hua Mulan and Deborah Sampson. She noted that while it was likely not meant to be a trans story, it "does invoke some problematic tropes that often surround such stories." She elaborated that this was due to Naoto's wish that she was a man so she could succeed as a detective contrasted real-world beliefs that that trans people transition to "benefit from the different expectations of the opposite sex."
