= Chie Satonaka =

Fictional character from the 2008 video game Persona 4

- Persona character
- Chie as seen in Persona 4 Arena
- First appearance: Onsen Nozokimi Daisakusen (2008)
- First major appearance: Persona 4 (2008)
- Designed by: Shigenori Soejima
- Voiced by: English: Tracey Rooney (2008); Erin Fitzgerald (2012–2018); Anne Yatco (Revival); Japanese: Yui Horie
- Portrayed by: Minami Tsukui (stage play); Makoto Koichi (Arena & Arena Ultimax stage plays)

In-universe information
- Nationality: Japanese

Chie Satonaka (Japanese: 里中 千枝, Hepburn: Satonaka Chie) is a character from the 2008 video game Persona 4. There, she appears as a 16 year old student who starts investigating an alternate dimension labeled as the "TV World" alongside her other teens in her town of Inaba as well as the detective Naoto Shirogane. The kidnapping of her best friend Yukiko Amagi by a serial killer throughout Inaba, leads Chie to join the Investigation Team in working to find the murderer whose victims are sent to the TV World to be killed by creatures known as Shadows.

Besides printed and animated adaptations of the Persona 4 game, Chie has also appeared in the fighting games Persona 4 Arena and Persona 4 Arena Ultimax, the dungeon crawler Persona Q: Shadow of the Labyrinth, and the rhythm game Persona 4: Dancing All Night. Critical reception to the character has been positive due to her fighting-related and tomboyish nature. However, critics were differing when commenting on the English voice acting from Chie featured in the games.

== Character creation ==
In the designing of the character, various sketches were made with some of them being reminiscent to previous Persona characters. Artist Shigenori Soejima said the concept of Chie was that of a "cute girl who could actually exist in real life". As a result, Soejima paid close attention to how realistic her design could be. The most challenging parts about creating the character was giving a balance between. The shape of her head was also challenging as it could not be too round or too long. As a result, Soejima claimed that he had repeatedly remake the character. According to Soejima, Chie's personality highly defines her character such as how she adores cheap, retro things and other accessories. As a result, Chie comes across as the turning point that defines the overall flavor of Persona 4. Since Inaba is a rural town, Chie's design originally incorporated elements fitting for such setting such as having a jersey jacket which she often uses for jogging. However, since such jersey did not look well in the game, it was revised and instead her design carried something "utterly lame" which served as a major foundation for the rest of the characters. Her most common color is yellow which made her fit with the game's logo. When it comes to the concept of her design, Chie came across as teenager who pay average attention to her fashion while her hair color was made to be believable in real life.

Her two Personas, Tomoe and Suzuka Gongen, were based on Japanese mythology. Although these two are major figures in myths, they were chosen for Chie as they are both one of the strongest women in Japanese mythology. Chie's personal tastes were incorporated into the two Personas, resulting in a "macho" feeling whereas Tomoe is based on Bruce Lee's design from a movie Chie is a fan of. They also wear helmets due to the rule that every Persona should wear protective items. This was inspired also by Soejima's fascination with motorcycles helmets. Once Tomoe evolves into Gongen, her helmet changes from a standard street bike helmet to an off-road bike helmet in order to emphasize thoroughness. Gongen's weaponry was designed with the idea it can be separated into two different weapons that the Persona could wield at the same time. Meanwhile, Shadow Chie was designed to represent her dark side when it came to her relationship with Yukiko as it emphasizes her jealousy of her popularity leading to the Shadow having two beings, with one being Chie's superiority stepping over Yukiko's body.

Chie is voiced by Yui Horie in Japanese. In English, she is voiced by Tracey Rooney in Persona 4, Anne Yatco in Persona 4 Revival, and Erin Fitzgerald in all other appearances. Minami Tsukui portrays her in the stage play adaptation of Persona 4. Mariya Ise was originally cast as Chie in the stage play adaptation of Persona 4 Arena, but she was replaced by Makoto Koichi following health problems and her pregnancy. A limited edition of Persona 4 Arena featured the buttons Chie wore in Persona 4 as a bonus.

== Appearances ==
Chie first appears in the 2008 browser game Onsen Nozokimi Daisakusen, where the player spies on her in an onsen bath; her first major appearance is in the 2008 role-playing video game Persona 4, where she and her friends, the player character Yu Narukami and the classmate Yosuke Hanamura, discover a world within televisions containing Shadows – monsters from repressed parts of people's psyches. Chie is an upbeat girl with an obsession with kung fu, even using those techniques in battle. Chie serves as the player's Social Link to The Chariot; this is symbolized in the animated series by Yu's usage of the Persona Ara Mitama (アラミタマ). Although initially reluctant, she goes into the TV world when her best friend Yukiko Amagi is thrown in, putting her in danger. There, Chie encounters her Shadow who represents her jealousy of Yukiko's feminine side and talents, as well as her wish and need to maintain control over Yukiko. With Yu and Yosuke's help, Chie confronts her other self and joins the Investigation Team. Following the encounter with her Shadow, Chie receives the Persona Tomoe Gozen (トモエ, Tomoe), a muscular female figure wearing a yellow outfit and armed with a naginata, that she uses in combat while she performs kicks. Throughout Yu's interactions with Chie (which can also be intimate), she discovers that she genuinely wanted to protect Yukiko without any underlying selfish motivations. After this, Tomoe evolves into Suzuka Gongen (スズカゴンゲン), whose yellow jumpsuit turns black and is decked in silver samurai armor. The desire to protect people eventually inspires her to seek a career as a police officer. In the re-release Persona 4: Golden, Chie's Persona can evolve to a third level to become Haraedo-no-Okami (ハラエドノオオカミ, Haraedo-no-Ōkami), which has golden armor and a long flowing cape.

Chie is playable in Persona 4 Arena alongside Tomoe Gozen; In Persona 4 Arena, Chie joins Yu, Yosuke and Yukiko to investigate the TV world after seeing the Midnight Channel. When she enters, she is forced to fight her friends as well as a man, Akihiko Sanada. She also appears in Persona Q: Shadow of the Labyrinth, Persona Q2: New Cinema Labyrinth, and in Persona 4: Dancing All Night. On October 20, 2017, it was confirmed by Arc System Works that Chie would appear in the upcoming fighting game BlazBlue: Cross Tag Battle. It was further confirmed on January 13, 2018, that Chie would be in the base game. Additionally, Chie is featured in the anime television series adaptation of Persona 4.

== Reception ==
Chie Satonaka has been identified by Kat Bailey from US Gamer and Leigh Alexander from Polygon as their favorite character. Alexander cited Chie's final Social Link sequence where she "realises that dedicating yourself to personal growth is cowardice, and that it's all meaningless unless you turn around and start fighting – start /using/ this strength you've amassed." Robert Boyd, creator of Breath of Death VII and Cthulhu Saves the World, ranked Chie as the second best "JRPG warrior heroine." He justified the ranking by saying that she "kicks things to death" and called her a "great foil to the main character's best friend, Yosuke." Chie was named GamesRadar's favourite Persona 4 character. Kotaku's Mike Fahey called Chie as his favourite Persona 4 character and discussed "swoon[ing] over" her. Kotaku's Kirk Hamilton felt that Persona 4 featured more depth to its characters than its predecessor Persona 3. The writer cited Chie's "fear for her friend Yukiko and desire to be seen as feminine" as an example of this. Play regarded her as an example of positive writing in regards of female characters and wanted her to see her in more video games besides Persona 4. The character's fighting style involving kung fu also received praise by Futaman as it highlights her bright personality comparable to Princess Arena from Dragon Quest IV: Chapters of the Chosen.

Critical reception to both of Chie's English voice actresses have been mixed. While reviewing Persona 4, IGN's Jeff Haynes felt that Tracey Rooney's delivery as Chie sounded at times like a 30-year-old woman instead of a teenager. Reviewing the same game, RPGamer's Michael Cunningham felt that Rooney felt "a little stiff" during battle lines, but was fine elsewhere. While Kotaku's Kirk Hamilton was initially reluctant about Erin Fitzgerald while reviewing Persona 4 Golden, he eventually grew to like her. VG247's Johnny Cullen expressed excitement at the prospect of Chie's playability in Persona 4 Arena. In reviewing Persona 4 Golden, Destructoid's Dale North revealed he was not a fan of Fitzgerald's voice, due in part to the fact that he preferred Yui Horie, Chie's Japanese voice actress. RPGamer's senior reviews editor Adriaan den Oueden's initial impressions of Fitzgerald in his review of the same game were positive. She was also listed as the 10th best Persona character by Kimberley Wallace from Game Informer who commented "Chie remains one of the most likable characters to date". RPGFan agreed, regarding her as the best love interest from the entire game and that, while the Yu Narukami is a blank state due the handling of the game, the options given by the player make the two look as the best couple as the player can often support the heroine. IGN also listed her as the eighth best Persona character, praising her upbeat personality and her interests.

In an analysis of Persona characters, Ricardo Jorge de Lucena and Ana Raquel Romeu from Universidade de Fortaleza compared Chie to Ryuji Sakamoto from Persona 5 and Aigis from Persona 3 due to how they stand out in terms of strengths in their own respective games and how it is noticeable when the three become playable characters. Ghuilerme Pedrosa from Universidade Federal Do Ceara thinks that Persona 4 often challenged sexual identity and gender norms, with Chie being a subject too when going to Yukiko's Castle from the TV World and being seen as one of Yukiko's princes; In the process, it explored the theme of how Yukiko and Chie are friends who face conflicts related to femininity, awakening of male interest and female independence. However, the game does not explore a possible romantic attraction between these two characters. The writer praised the dynamic between the two characters as Chie is outgoing girl, fan of martial arts and sports, who feels frustrated at not getting people's attention for her beauty whereas Yukiko is a shy and reserved girl recognized for her beauty. Writer Patrick Hayes stated that her Shadow "represents her desire to maintain dominance over Yukiko in their relationship as well as her jealousy of Yukiko's feminine qualities and skills."
