= Onsen Nozokimi Daisakusen =

2008 video game

- Title screen featuring Chie Satonaka
- Developer: Atlus
- Publisher: Atlus
- Series: Persona
- Platform: Browser
- Release: JP: July 2, 2008
- Genre: Rhythm
- Mode: Single-player

Onsen Nozokimi Daisakusen (Note: Japanese: 温泉ノゾき見大作戦; "The Great Onsen Peeping Operation") is a 2008 rhythm video game published by Atlus. An Adobe Flash game, it was created as part of a promotion for Persona 4 and was playable on the Japanese Persona 4 website.

The minigame involves the player clicking to the beat of the music to spy on the Persona 4 character Chie Satonaka in the women's side of an onsen hot-spring bath, through a hole in the middle partition. The game took inspiration from how the player visits a bath in Persona 4, but the scenario is otherwise not connected to Persona 4's. The game was popular but saw mixed reception: some were baffled by the concept and the game's existence, while some enjoyed it.

== Gameplay ==
The player clicks to the beat of the music to fill up the heart gauge.

Onsen Nozokimi Daisakusen is a rhythm minigame in which the player, located on the men's side of an open-air onsen hot-spring bath, tries to look into the women's side through a hole in the middle partition to spy on the Persona 4 character Chie Satonaka while she is bathing, while avoiding getting caught.

To do so, the player must repeatedly click with the mouse on the hole to the beat of the music, in double time, to fill up a heart gauge. They have to avoid clicking too rapidly, which results in Chie noticing them, calling them a pervert, and beating them up; if they on the other hand click too slowly, the fifteen-second timer runs out, and they lose their chance to look any further. Completing the game lets the player see Chie bathing and gives them the option to play a second challenge where they get to see her bathing together with Yukiko Amagi, another Persona 4 character.

== Development and release ==
Onsen Nozokimi Daisakusen was developed in Adobe Flash, and took inspiration from a sequence where the player visits a bath in Persona 4, although the scenario is otherwise not connected to Persona 4's plot. Siliconera described it as part of a trend of Japanese video games having Flash-based demos, while noting that Onsen Nozokimi Daisakusen does not actually act as a demo for Persona 4.

The game was published by Atlus on July 2, 2008, as a browser game playable on the official Japanese Persona 4 website, released as part of a promotion for the Japanese release of Persona 4 the following week, together with wallpapers and new trailers. In 2015, Atlus released Hanate Wotagei! Rise no Dance Battle, (Note: Hanate Wotagei! Rise no Dance Battle (放てヲタ芸！りせのダンスバトル, Hanate Wotagei! Rise no Dansu Batoru; "Unleash the Wotagei Dance! Rise's Dance Battle)) another browser game with similar clicking gameplay but different theming, to promote their rhythm game Persona 4: Dancing All Night.

== Reception ==
Onsen Nozokimi Daisakusen was popular and well received by players, according to NLab, who noted that their review of it was their most-read article of the week, calling the game "loved by everyone". Hayato Ikeya, writing for the same site, found the game shocking as a long-time fan of Persona, considering it uncharacteristic for the series; despite his initial reservations, he found it fun and exciting, and liked its ending. GameSpark merely expressed bafflement at the game's existence when summarizing the domestic game industry news of the week.

Wataru Katou, another NLab writer, described the game's peeping conceit as centered on "a foolish male mentality" and as something that would be illegal in reality, but said that he understood the appeal of wanting to see something one is forbidden from and satisfying one's curiosity when hearing the voice of a girl one likes from the other side of the onsen partition. Wired called the game perverted but sexy, and something to tide Persona fans over while waiting for Persona 4. They described the gameplay as simple but hard to master, and were themselves unable to finish the game; New Akiba recommended those who do not want to go through the effort of completing the game to instead watch a video playthrough. Wired described the sequence where Chie notices the player as "[verging] on insane"; Ikeya said that he and his colleagues found the sequence more exciting than the rewards for winning. Kōichi Imafuji of NLab, while enjoying the voyeuristic premise, said that the game has more to it: he enjoyed the responsiveness of the clicking controls, and found the difficulty of the challenges engaging.
