= Akemi Kanda =

Japanese voice actress

- 神田 朱未
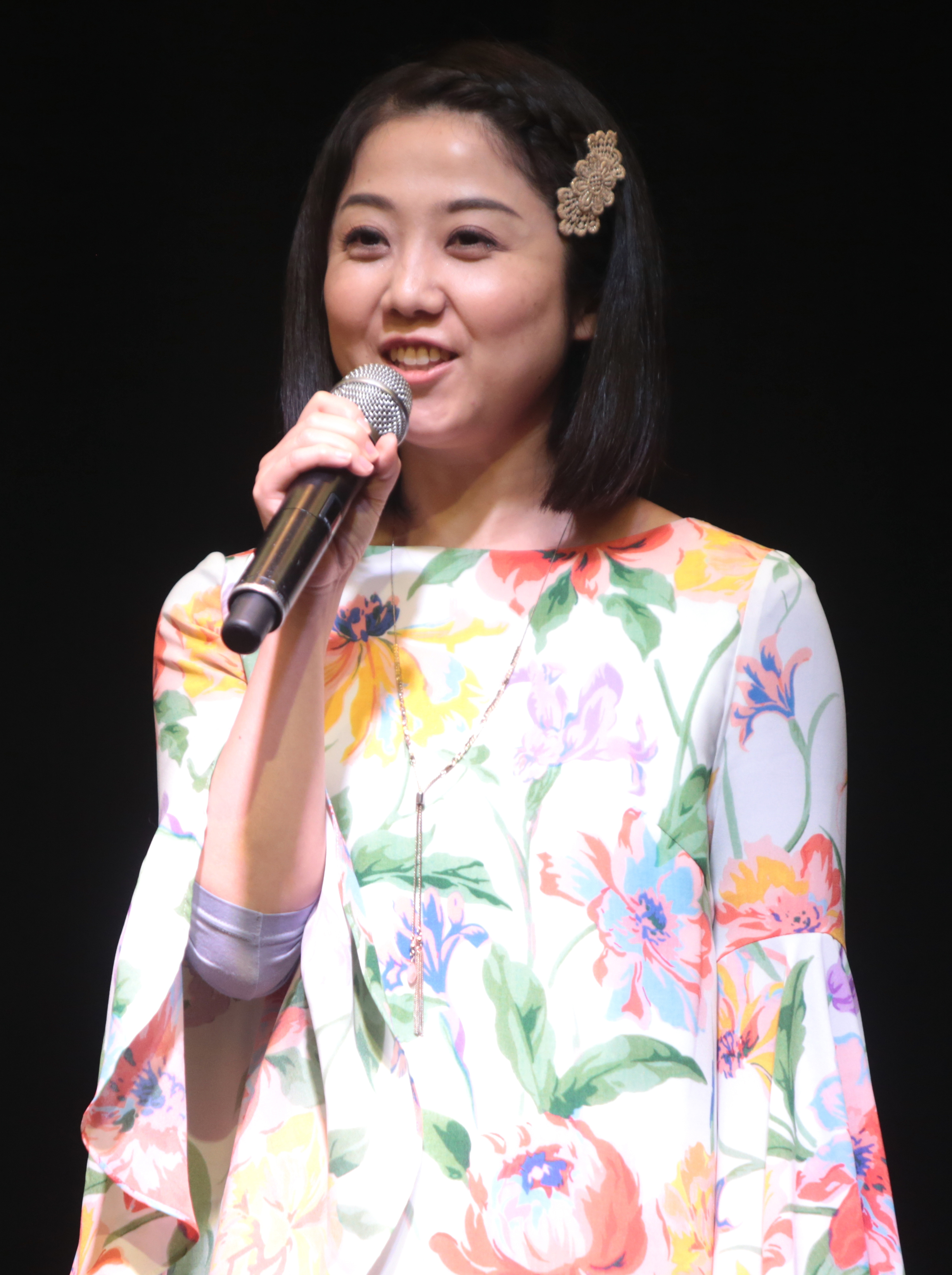
- Kanda at Taiyou Con 2017
- Born: November 10, 1978 (age 47); Nagoya, Japan
- Status: Married
- Occupation: Voice actress
- Years active: 2000–present
- Agent: galm

Akemi Kanda (神田 朱未, Kanda Akemi; born November 10, 1978) is a Japanese voice actress, originally affiliated with Aoni Production and becomes a freelancer in April 2017. Her then founded and joined the agency Galm on June 1, 2025, together with fellow actors and creative acquaintances. Her major anime roles include: Asuna Kagurazaka in the Negima series, Kana Suouin in Otome wa Boku ni Koishiteru, Kazuki Arisaka in Tona-Gura!, Rihoko Amaha in Witchblade, Ryou Fujibayashi in Clannad, Tokino Akiyama in Kujibiki Unbalance, and Nina Sakura in Ultra Maniac. She also sings with the voice actors on songs for the anime shows and is associated with voice actor units Drops and Aice5, releasing multiple character and compilation albums. In video games she voices Estelle Bright in The Legend of Heroes: Trails in the Sky, Nanako Dojima in Persona 4, Mio Amakura in Fatal Frame II: Crimson Butterfly, and Melody in Rune Factory.

== Filmography ==
=== Anime ===
List of voice performances in anime
Year	Series	Role	Notes	Source
2000	Vandread	Crew O		
2000	Argento Soma	Operator		
2001	Prétear	Mawata Awayuki		
2001	Crush Gear Turbo	Kaoru Hanano		
2001	Yobarete Tobidete Akubi-chan	Akari Nakano		
2002	Witch Hunter Robin	Minori Nakayama		
2002	Princess Tutu	Anteaterina	Ep. 2	
2002	Kiddy Grade	Twinkle		
2002	Tokyo Mew Mew	Student		
2003–05	Da Capo	Miharu Amakase	Also Second Season	
2003	Ultra Maniac	Nina Sakura		
2004	Onmyō Taisenki	Nazuna		
2004	Monkey Turn	Koko Takahashi	Also Monkey Turn V	
2004	Soreike! Zukkoke Sanningumi	Yumiko Enomoto		
2004	Elfen Lied	Kurama's Wife	Ep. 10	
2004	Kujibiki Unbalance	Tokino Akiyama		
2004	Yakitate!! Japan	Heidi		
2005–11	Negima!	Asuna Kagurazaka	Also specials and OADs	
2005	Kamichu!	Tohu-chan, others		
2005	Canvas 2: Niji Iro no Sketch	Ai Saginomiya	Ep. 15	
2006	Witchblade	Rihoko Amaha		
2006	Crash B-Daman	Nana Sendo		
2006	Ayakashi	Usu		
2006	Tokko	Saya Shindou		
2006	Kamisama Kazoku	Meme Kamiyama		
2006	Kiba	Boy		
2006	Tona-Gura!	Kazuki Arisaka		
2006	La Corda D'Oro	Miyabi Yunoki		
2006–07	Negima!?	Asuna Kagurazaka		
2006	Gin'iro no Olynssis	Misuzu		
2006	Hell Girl: Two Mirrors	Maho Suzaki	Ep. 9	
2006	Otome wa Boku ni Koishiteru	Kana Suouin		
2007	Bleach	Mashiro Kuna		
2007	Polyphonica	Aria	Ep. 6	
2007	Bokurano	Yuu Usui		
2007	Baccano!	Czeslaw Meyer		
2007–09	Clannad	Ryou Fujibayashi	Also After Story	
2007	Hero Tales	Laila Seiren		
2007	Moyasimon: Tales of Agriculture	Hazuki Oikawa		
2007–09	Shugo Chara!	Lulu de Morcel Yamamoto	Also Shugo Chara! Doki	
2008	Kamen no Maid Guy	Shizuku		
2008	Monochrome Factor	Mao Kanzaki	Ep. 18	
2008	Kyōran Kazoku Nikki	Black Santa/Santa Girl	Ep. 21	
2008	Battle Spirits: Shōnen Toppa Bashin	Fumiko "Meganeko" Otonashi		
2008	Kannagi: Crazy Shrine Maidens	Female Student	Eps. 9, 13	
2009–11	Maria Holic	Nanami Kiri	Also Maria Holic Alive	
2009	Cross Game	Akane Takigawa, Wakaba Tsukishima		
2009	GA Geijutsuka Art Design Class	Chikako Awara		
2009	Anyamaru Tantei Kiruminzuu	Various characters		
2009	Polyphonica Crimson S	Aria		
2010	SD Gundam Sangokuden Brave Battle Warriors	Sun Shang Xiang (Son Shō Kō Gerbera)		
2010	Hime Chen! Otogi Chikku Idol Lilpri	Roo		
2010–11	Squid Girl	Kozue Tanabe	Ep. 12; Also Shinryaku!? Ika Musume Ep. 12	
2011	The Mystic Archives of Dantalian	Mildred	Ep. 3	
2011	Battle Spirits: Heroes	Nora Nyao/Dragon Eye	Ep. 44	
2011-14	Persona 4: The Animation	Nanako Dojima	Also Golden Animation	
2012	Sengoku Collection	White Lotus Sōji Okita		
2012	Jormungand	Chinatsu	Eps. 3–4	
2012-13	AKB0048	Yūko Ōshima the 9th	Also Next Stage	
2012	Upotte!!	Saiga/SAIGA12k		
2012	Moyasimon Returns	Hazuki Oikawa		
2012	Tanken Driland	Awilda, Koretsuki Hilde	Also Sennen no Maho	
2012	Battle Spirits: Sword Eyes	Amarero		
2012	Hayate the Combat Butler: Can't Take My Eyes Off You	Dolly	Ep. 9	
2012	Little Busters!	Reu Kawagoe		
2012	Magi: The Labyrinth of Magic	Toya	Eps. 4–5	
2013	Miss Monochrome: The Animation	Mana		
2014	Minna Atsumare! Falcom Gakuen	Estelle Bright		
2014	Tenkai Knights	Seiran Washizaki		
2014–15	Dragon Collection	Naviko		
2014	Sailor Moon Crystal	Haruna Sakurada, Kotono Sarashina		
2021	Kaginado	Ryou Fujibayashi		

=== Overseas dubbing ===
List of voice performances in live-action dubs
Year	Series	Role	Notes	Source
	American Beauty	Jane Burnham	Dub voice for Thora Birch	
	Once Upon a Time in America	Deborah Gelly (young	Dub voice for Jennifer Connelly	
	Sad Love Story	Park Hye-in		
	Trapped	Abby Jennings	Dub voice for Dakota Fanning	

=== Video games ===
List of voice performances in video games
Year	Series	Role	Notes	Source
2001	Tokimeki Memorial 3: Yakusoku no Ano Basho de	Yukiko Makihara		
2003	Fatal Frame II: Crimson Butterfly	Mio Amakura	Also Project Zero 2 remake	
2003	Summon Night 3	Sonora		
2004	Black Matrix 00	Terios	PS1	
2004	Aoi Namida	Saeko Hibino	Xbox	
2004–14	The Legend of Heroes: Trails in the Sky	Estelle Bright	Also FC, SC, the 3rd, Evolution versions	
2004	Mega Man X: Command Mission	Nana		
2005	Mahou Sensei Negima! 1-Jikanme ~Okochama Sensei wa Mahoutsukai!~		PS2 game	
2005	Tales of Legendia	Mimi Bread		
2006	Clannad	Ryou Fujibayashi	PS2 version	
2006	WarTech: Senko no Ronde	Lili Levinas	Xbox 360 edition	
2006	Simple 2000 Series Vol. 104: The Robot Tsukurouze! - Gekitou! Robot Fight	Ai	PS2	
2006	Rockman Rockman	Ice Man	Japanese version of Mega Man Powered Up	
2006	Rune Factory: A Fantasy Harvest Moon	Melody	Nintendo DS	
2006	Wrestle Angels Survivor		PS2	
2006	Himehibi ~ Princess Days ~	Maaya Harumura		
2007	Dragon Shadow Spell	Sarah Sacred Heart		
2007	Wonderland Online: Ankoku no kinjutsu	Vanessa	Windows	
2008	D.C.P.S. -Da Capo- Plus Situation	Sara		
2008–12	Persona 4	Nanako Dojima	Also Golden	
2008	Klonoa	Hewpoe	Phantomile version	
2010	Angelic Crest	Samantha		
2011	Hyperdimension Neptunia Mk2	Falcom		
2011	Dynasty Warriors 7	Lianshi		
2011	Warriors Orochi 3	Lianshi, Sanzang		
2013	Hyperdimension Neptunia Re;Birth1	Falcom		
2013	Dynasty Warriors 8	Lianshi		
2014	Hyperdimension Neptunia Re;Birth2 Sisters Generation	Falcom		
2015	Bladestorm Nightmare	Margaret		
2018	Dynasty Warriors 9	Lianshi		
2018	Warrior Orochi	Lianshi, Sanzang		
2018	The Legend of Heroes: Trails of Cold Steel IV	Estelle Bright	PS4	
2020	The Legend of Heroes: Trails into Reverie	Estelle Bright	PS4	
2025	Granblue Fantasy	Asuna Kagurazaka		

== Discography ==
=== Albums ===
Studio and mini-albums

- Daisuki (大好き) (Konami, 2002)
- Tona-Gura! Character mini album Katsuki-Hatsune (となグラ！キャラクターミニアルバム 香月・初音) (Starchild, 2006)
- Tona-Gura! Character mini album Katsuki-Chihaya (となグラ！キャラクターミニアルバム 香月・ちはや) (Starchild, 2006)
- Tona-Gura! Character song album Donari Gurashi Discography! (となグラ！キャラソンアルバム どなりぐらしDiscography!) (Starchild, 2006)
- Tona-Gura! Arisaka Kazuki mini album Distance of First Love (となグラ！有坂香月ミニアルバム Distance ofFirstLove) (Starchild, 2006)
- Negima!? CD songs 1 (ネギま！？うたのCD(1)) (Starchild, 2006)

with Aice5

- Love Aice5 (Starchild, 2007)

with DROPS

- Can Drops (Starchild, 2004)

Compilation albums

- Bitter Sweet Friday (King Records, KIZC-7~8, 2007)

=== Drama CDs ===
List of voice performances in drama CDs
Year	Series	Role	Notes	Source
	Clannad	Ryou Fujibayashi		
	Cobalt Tokimeki Drama CD Remix			
	Da Capo	Miharu Amakase		
	Demon King Daimao	Lily Shiraishi		
	Infantaia	Kelsha		
	Negima!	Asuna Kagurazaka		
	Maromayu	Tsubasa		
