= Nanako Dojima =

Persona 4 character

- Persona character
- Nanako Dojima, as she appears in Persona 4
- First appearance: Persona 4 (2008)
- Voiced by: EN: Karen Strassman (original), Courtney Shaw (Revival); JA: Akemi Kanda

In-universe information
- Nationality: Japanese

Nanako Dojima (Japanese: 堂島 菜々子, Hepburn: Dōjima Nanako) is a character in the 2008 PlayStation 2 video game Persona 4 by Atlus. She is initially shy to player-character and cousin Yu Narukami, but eventually grows more comfortable. She struggles through the game with loneliness, the loss of her mother, and concern over her father Ryotaro Dojima, who is often absent due to his job as a detective. She appears as a playable character in Persona 4: Dancing All Night, where designers made a point to try to avoid her dancing style seem too adult. She has been well-received and is regarded as one of the best characters in Persona 4. Multiple critics held her as an example of a quality child character in video games.

== Concept and creation ==
Nanako Dojima was created for Persona 4. She is the young cousin of Yu Narukami, and Ryotaro Dojima's only daughter. Nanako is a guileless girl, and is usually left at home due to her father's work. Nanako is capable of taking care of herself. She is voiced by Akemi Kanda in Japanese, and was voiced by Karen Strassman in English until Courtney Shaw took over in Persona 4 Revival. When designing Nanako as a playable character for Persona 4: Dancing All Night, designer Kanami Mashita desired to avoid potentially making her too flamboyant or provocative in how she dances, as he found these "completely out of character." The design staff employed an adult idol do the motion capture rather than a child dancer, which created problems as it took time and effort to avoid giving Nanako "allure" from the idol's dancing.

== Appearances ==
Nanako appears in Persona 4. She starts off initially shy to Yu, but eventually regards him as a brother. She expresses anxiety over her mother's death and how much her father Ryotaro, a detective investigating the murders central to Persona 4's plot, works to Yu, worrying it means he does not love her. Yu helps Nanako come to terms with her father's busy professional life, and Nanako realizes he misses her mother as much as she does. Over the course of the game, Nanako finds herself befriending Yu's friends. Late in the story, Nanako is kidnapped by Taro Namatame and placed into the TV world. During the investigation of Namatame, Nanako passes away for reasons unknown to the doctor; Yu is then forced to choose between exacting revenge on Namatame or sparing him. If Namatame is killed, Nanako's death is set and the game will end. If the protagonist chooses not to take revenge and save his life, but fail to convince the rest of the team that something’s missing, or find out who the real culprit is, Nanako will come back to life, but is in a coma. If they capture the real killer, then Nanako will be miraculously resuscitated, claiming she heard the player characters' voices.

== Reception ==
Nanako has received generally positive reception. She ranked highly among the cast of Persona 4 in a fan poll. Another poll at the 2014 Tokyo Game Show had her being considered the best female character in the game. Kimberley Wallace of Game Informer found her one of the best characters in the Persona series, praising her for her sweet disposition and the emotion she felt when she calls Yu "big bro." She also calls her one of the best child characters in gaming. Nanako's temporary death was regarded as the most memorable scene of Persona 4 by Susan Arendt of GamesRadar+, who also called it "heartbreaking." Lucas M. Thomas of IGN included her kidnapping and temporary death as one of the most unforgettable moments in video games. He found the bond between her and the player to be the strongest in the game. Patrick Hancock of Destructoid felt that the most touching moment in Persona 4, noting that it made him cry. He also considered the "familial love" of a big brother to a little sister as one of the best shows of love in gaming. Jason Schreier of Kotaku found Nanako and her habit of singing the Junes jingle as qualities that made Persona 4 special.

Her role in Persona 4: Dancing All Night was met with praise. Donald Theriault of Nintendo World Report felt she was a rare example of a good child character and that her dancing in the game made his "heart melt." Alissa McAloon similarly enjoyed her role in this game, calling her "adorable." Nate Ewert-Krocker of Paste Magazine found Nanako's dancing to be "genuine," and noted that it helped clear the "violent, misanthropic gunk" away from video games for a moment.
