= Aice5 =

Japanese pop group

Aice^{5}
- Origin: Japan
- Genres: J-pop; Alternative; Anison
- Occupation: Voice actress
- Years active: 2005–2007; 2015–present
- Labels: Star Child (2005–2007); Evil Line Records (2015–present)
- Members: Yui Horie (leader); Akemi Kanda; Madoka Kimura; Masumi Asano; Chiaki Takahashi
- Website: http://10th-anniversary.com/

Aice^{5} (アイス, Aisu) is an all-female Japanese pop group that comprises five voice actresses: Yui Horie, Chiaki Takahashi, Akemi Kanda, Masumi Asano and Madoka Kimura. Yui Horie founded the group on October 29, 2005. Two of the songs they produced, "Yūjō Monogatari" and "Love Power" were featured as the ending theme of the anime series Inukami! and the opening theme of the anime series Otome wa Boku ni Koishiteru respectively. The songs "Eternity" and "Brand New Day" were used in the anime Ground Defense Force! Mao-chan as well. The group was officially disbanded as of September 20, 2007, on Yui Horie's thirty-first birthday. On July 17, 2015, they announce to be reunited for their 10th anniversary as well as casting in anime Seiyu's Life!, the comic written by Masumi Asano, a member of Aice^{5} and illustrated by comic artist Kenjiro Hata.

== Discography ==
=== Singles ===
- Get Back, released March 11, 2006
  1. "Get Back"
- Believe My Love, released May 24, 2006
  1. "Believe My Love"
  2. "Yūjō Monogatari"
- Love Power, released October 25, 2006
  1. "Love Power"
  2. "smile"
- Brand New Day, released April 25, 2007
  1. "Brand New Day"
  2. "Eternity"
  3. "Short Short Cake"
- Letter, released April 29, 2007
  1. "Letter"
- Re.MEMBER, released September 5, 2007
  1. "Re.MEMBER"
  2. "Ura Yuujou Monogatari"
  3. "Yakusoku -I will stand by you-"
- Be With You

=== Albums ===
- Love Aice^{5}, released February 14, 2007
