= Otome wa Boku ni Koishiteru =

2005 Japanese adult visual novel (video game)

- Original visual novel cover of Otome wa Boku ni Koishiteru

処女はお姉さまに恋してる (Windows) 乙女はお姉さまに恋してる (PS2/PSP)
- Genre: Harem, Romance
- Video game
- Developer: Caramel Box
- Publisher: Caramel Box (Windows); Alchemist (PS2/PSP); MangaGamer (Windows)
- Genre: Eroge, visual novel
- Platform: Windows, PS2, PSP
- Released: January 28, 2005 (Windows)
- Manga
- Written by: Caramel Box
- Illustrated by: Kanao Araki
- Published by: ASCII Media Works
- Magazine: Dengeki Daioh
- Original run: November 2006 – August 2008
- Volumes: 2
- Anime television series

Otoboku: Maidens Are Falling For Me!
- Directed by: Munenori Nawa
- Produced by: Tomoko Kawasaki; Gō Shukuri; Kazuya Takahashi; Hidehiro Kashiwagi
- Written by: Katsumi Hasegawa
- Music by: Toshimichi Isoe
- Studio: Feel
- Licensed by: NA: Media Blasters
- Original network: Chiba TV
- Original run: October 8, 2006 – December 24, 2006
- Episodes: 12 + OVA
- Video game

Otome wa Boku ni Koishiteru: Futari no Elder
- Developer: Caramel Box (Windows); Alchemist (PSP)
- Publisher: Hobibox (Windows); Kaga Create (PSP)
- Genre: Eroge, visual novel
- Platform: Windows, PSP
- Released: June 30, 2010 (Windows)
- Manga

Otome wa Boku ni Koishiteru: Futari no Elder
- Written by: Caramel Box
- Illustrated by: Akuru Uira
- Published by: Kadokawa Shoten
- Magazine: Comp Ace
- Original run: July 2010 – February 2012
- Volumes: 3
- Original video animation

Otome wa Boku ni Koishiteru: Futari no Elder
- Directed by: Shinya Kawatsura
- Produced by: Hayato Kaneko; Kazuya Takahashi; Shinsaku Tanaka
- Written by: Michiko Yokote
- Music by: Kou Nakagawa
- Studio: Silver Link
- Released: August 29, 2012 – October 24, 2012
- Runtime: 24 minutes each
- Episodes: 3
- Video game

Otome wa Boku ni Koishiteru: Trinkle Stars
- Developer: Caramel Box
- Genre: Eroge, visual novel
- Platform: Windows
- Released: February 23, 2018
- Original video animation

Otome wa Boku ni Koishiteru: Trinkle Stars
- Directed by: Fumio Ito
- Produced by: Masayoshi Matsumoto
- Written by: Misato Tōsaka
- Music by: ZIZZ Studio
- Studio: Blue Bread
- Released: January 28, 2022
- Runtime: 20 minutes
- icon

Otome wa Boku ni Koishiteru (処女はお姉さま(ボク)に恋してる; lit. The Maidens Are Falling in Love with Me), commonly known as Otoboku (おとボク), is a Japanese adult visual novel developed by Caramel Box and released on January 28, 2005, playable on Windows PCs. The game was later ported to the PlayStation 2 and PlayStation Portable (PSP) with the adult content removed. The Windows version was released in English by MangaGamer in 2012. The story follows the life of Mizuho Miyanokouji, an androgynous male high school student, who transfers into an all-girls school due to his grandfather's will.

The gameplay in Otoboku follows a branching plot line which offers pre-determined scenarios with courses of interaction, and focuses on the appeal of the six female main characters by the player character. The game ranked as the second best-selling PC game sold in Japan for the time of its release, and charted in the national top 50 several more times afterwards. Caramel Box went on to produce two fan discs released in 2005 and 2007 in Caramel Box Yarukibako and Caramel Box Yarukibako 2, respectively. Caramel Box later produced a sequel to Otoboku titled Otome wa Boku ni Koishiteru: Futari no Elder, released on June 30, 2010, playable on Windows PCs. Futari no Elder was ported to the PSP with the adult content removed. The story follows Chihaya Kisakinomiya, an androgynous male, who transfers into the all-girls school that was the setting of Otoboku. A third Otoboku game titled Otome wa Boku ni Koishiteru: Trinkle Stars was released on February 23, 2018, playable on Windows PCs.

A manga adaptation of Otoboku was serialized in ASCII Media Works' Dengeki Daioh, and a manga adaptation of Futari no Elder was serialized in Kadokawa Shoten's Comp Ace. Comic anthologies, light novels and art books were also published, as were audio dramas and several music albums. A 12-episode Otoboku anime produced by Feel aired in Japanese between October and December 2006, and an extra original video animation (OVA) episode was released in April 2007. Media Blasters licensed the anime and released the series in three DVD volumes. The Otoboku anime was generally panned in reviews at Anime News Network where the series was described as "cruelly unimaginative" with "obnoxious quirks and technical shortcomings". In a review of the anime by Mania Entertainment, the series is thought to be "very predictable and bland". A three-episode OVA adaptation of Futari no Elder produced by Silver Link was released between August and October 2012. An OVA adaptation of Trinkle Stars produced by EXNOA with animation by Blue Bread was released in January 2022.

== Gameplay ==
Average dialogue and narrative in Otome wa Boku ni Koishiteru depicting the main character Mizuho talking to Kei (left) and Shion (right)

Otome wa Boku ni Koishiteru is a romance visual novel in which the player assumes the role of Mizuho Miyanokouji. Its gameplay requires little player interaction as much of the game's duration is spent on reading the text that appears on the screen, which represents the story's narrative and dialogue. Otoboku follows a branching plot line with multiple endings, and depending on the decisions that the player makes during the game, the plot will progress in a specific direction.

There are six main plot lines that the player will have the chance to experience, one for each of the heroines in the story. Every so often, the player will come to a point where he or she is given the chance to choose from multiple options. Text progression pauses at these points until a choice is made. To view all plot lines in their entirety, the player will have to replay the game multiple times and choose different choices to further the plot to an alternate direction. Each scenario is divided into eight episodes, one interlude episode and an epilogue. At the end of an episode, an announcement of the next episode appears showing a preview of what is to consist in the next episode. Each episode takes place within the span of one month between June and March from episode one through the epilogue. The interlude episode is placed between the second and third episodes.

In the adult versions of the game, there are scenes with sexual CGs depicting Mizuho and a given heroine having sex. When the game was ported to the PlayStation 2 (PS2) console, the gameplay was somewhat altered. The PS2 version, and later the PlayStation Portable (PSP) version, both had the sexual content removed, and in these versions there is no evidence that physical relationships actually take place between any of the students.

There are ten additional sub episodes and a special sub episode. The CD and DVD Windows editions contain four sub episodes, the fan disc Caramel Box Yarukibako contains four sub episodes and a special episode, Caramel Box Yarukibako 2 contains two sub episodes, and the PS2 version contains six sub episodes, though the order in which they appeared was altered.

Sub episodes

Episode	CDs	DVD	Yarukibako*1	Yarukibako2*2	PS2/PSP*3
Episode I	X	X			X(V)
Episode II	X	X			
Episode III	X	X			X(VI)
Episode IV	X	X			
Episode V	*4	*5	X		X(IV)
Episode VI			X		X(I)
Episode VII	*6		X		X(III)
Episode VIII		*5	X		X(II)
Episode X				X	
Episode XI				X	
Special			X		
*1:Caramel Box Yarukibako and its Fukkoku-ban; *2:Caramel Box Yarukibako 2; *3:Episode numbers are different. *4:Contained in the special favor disc for advance order *5:Merged to a certain path *6:Contained in the magazine Tech Gian (Feb. and Mar. 05)

In Otome wa Boku ni Koishiteru: Futari no Elder, the player assumes the roles of the main protagonist Chihaya Kisakinomiya and the secondary character Kaoruko Nanahara. There are six main plot lines that the player will have the chance to experience, one for each of the heroines in the story. In the adult versions of Futari no Elder, there are scenes with sexual CGs depicting Chihaya and a given heroine having sex. The gameplay is somewhat altered in the PSP version. The PSP version has the sexual content removed, the scenarios of Utano Sasou and Kaori Kamichika that appeared in the Windows version are removed, and it contains newly added scenarios of You Kashiwagi and Hatsune Minase. There are three additional sub episodes in the Windows version of Futari no Elder.

== Plot ==
=== Setting ===
The primary setting is at a private all-girls school named Seio Girls' Academy, also called Seio Jogakuin Christian Education, which was founded in 1886 by Mizuho's ancestor. Seio was originally named Keisen Girls' Academy (恵泉女学院, Keisen Jogakuin), which was used in original Windows version, the drama CD of the visual novel, and for the Caramel Box Yarukibako fan disc. This name was later ascertained to be similar to a name of an actual school, and the school's name was changed to Seio Girls' Academy (聖應女学院, Seiō Jogakuin; 聖応女学院 as written in PlayStation 2 version). Seio is used in the PlayStation 2 version, DVD Windows edition, Caramel Box Yarukibako Fukkoku-ban and anime series. The secondary setting is at a dormitory building named Sakura-yakata (櫻館), which Mizuho, Mariya, Yukari and Kana are boarding at. There are four other former dormitories named Tsubaki-yakata, Enoki-yakata, Hisagi-yakata and Hiiragi-yakata.

=== Main characters ===
The player assumes the role of Mizuho Miyanokouji, the protagonist of Otome wa Boku ni Koishiteru. He is a kind high school student who impersonates a girl at an all-girls school, which he transfers into per his grandfather's will. He spends his time with many fellow attendees, some of which live in the nearby dormitory, and enjoys helping them with any problems they may have. His childhood friend Mariya Mikado attends the school with him, and helps in his female transition. She has a spirited personality with a bit of a temper, and has been a support for Mizuho in the past. Mizuho meets a classmate named Shion Jujo^{[A]} who has a silent voice and demeanor; she quickly figures out that Mizuho is actually a boy, but tells no one. The previous year, she had to be hospitalized soon after she was elected as the Elder due to an illness.

At the dormitory lives an energetic first-year student named Yukari Kamioka. She is on the track and field team along with Mariya, who is her Oneesama (お姉さま; meaning "Older sister"), and has low confidence in her ability to run. Another first-year at the dormitory named Kana Suoin meets Mizuho on the day he moves in, and soon after Mizuho becomes her Oneesama. Kana is more than happy to serve Mizuho any way she can, since she admires him immensely. A hyperactive ghost resides in Mizuho's room named Ichiko Takashima and is shown to speak very fast when excited. She says that Mizuho looks very much like her previous Elder love interest, who turns out to be Mizuho's deceased mother. The student council president at Seio is Takako Itsukushima who tends to have a serious personality.

=== Story ===
Otome wa Boku ni Koishiteru revolves around the main protagonist Mizuho Miyanokouji, a male high school student. After Mizuho's grandfather dies, his will is reviewed, which explains his desire to have his grandson transfer to Seio Girls' Academy, the same one his own mother attended and his ancestors founded. Abiding by the will, Mizuho cross-dresses to attend the school. The headmistress, the deputy head teacher (visual novel only), Mizuho's homeroom teacher Hisako Kajiura and Mariya Mikado initially know his secret; Shion Jujo and Ichiko Takashima also eventually find this out. Mizuho is very popular among the other students, who often talk about how pretty, nice, and athletic Mizuho is. This rampant popularity escalates to him even being nominated against his will to join in on the Elder election. By these terms, the current student council president, Takako Itsukushima, runs against Mizuho.

The Elder election is an old tradition at Seio Girls' Academy where every June one of the students is elected by her peers to be the "Elder", who is seen as the number one "Elder Sister" in the school. Until her graduation, she is referred to by her peers as Onee-sama (お姉さま). To become an Elder, a candidate must gain at least 75% of the votes. If none of the candidates get at least 75% in the first round of voting, one of the candidates hands over her votes to another candidate, and the candidate who finally obtains at least 75% of the votes becomes the Elder. If there is no one else in the election, the current year's student council president becomes the Elder. In Otoboku, Mizuho gains 82% of the votes in the first round, effectively becoming the 72nd Elder in the school's history. After becoming Elder, Mizuho progressively gets more popular among the student body, since he is now a symbol of the school's excellence. In the following months, Mizuho starts to get to know some of the girls better and helps them with their problems.

==== Futari no Elder ====
Otome wa Boku ni Koishiteru: Futari no Elder is written from the viewpoints of main character Chihaya Kisakinomiya and secondary character Kaoruko Nanahara. Futari no Elder begins about two years after Mizuho's graduation. The main protagonist Chihaya Mikado was truant at his school because of harassment in the school and of a distrust in men. His mother cannot bear to watch him be in trouble, so she makes him transfer to Seio Girls' Academy, her old school. He dresses as a girl and introduces himself as Chihaya Kisakinomiya. Chihaya meets another protagonist Kaoruko Nanahara, who once rescued him from a playboy, and he begins to live in the dormitory building. He becomes the focus of public attention due to his attractive face and figure, and due to high grades at studies.

In the 75th Elder election, there are four finalists; Hatsune Minase hands over her votes to Kaoruko and Makiyo Shingyouji hands over her votes to Chihaya. Then Chihaya and Kaoruko gain the same votes of 368 together. Though a candidate which gains 75% or more of the votes becomes the Elder, Hatsune, as the student council president, proposes that both Chihaya and Kaoruko become the Elders; the motion is adopted unanimously. This is the first time there have been two Elders in the history of Seio Girls' Academy.

== Development ==
Otome wa Boku ni Koishiteru is the fourth visual novel developed by Caramel Box. The scenario is written by Aya Takaya, and this was the first time Takaya was staffed on a Caramel Box game. Art direction and character design is done by Norita, who was staffed on Caramel Box's debut release Blue as an artist. The super deformed illustrations featured in Otoboku were drawn by the game illustrator Yoda. The music was composed by the music team Zizz Studio.

The original title uses the kanji 処女 (shojo), which means "virgin", but is very close to the word for "young lady", shōjo. The creators added furigana subscript to indicate they wanted it read "otome" meaning "young maiden". Additionally, furigana was added above お姉さま (onee-sama) to indicate that they wanted it read "boku". Despite the different kanji, the official reading is "Otome wa Boku ni Koishiteru". When the game was ported to the PlayStation 2, it was rewritten as 乙女はお姉さまに恋してる with the same pronunciation of "Otome wa Boku ni Koishiteru", which uses the actual "otome" (乙女) kanji. The latter name was kept for the manga and anime releases.

=== Release history ===
A free game demo of Otome wa Boku ni Koishiteru can be downloaded at the game's official website. The game was released as an adult game on January 28, 2005, as a limited edition, playable on a Windows PC as a 2-disc CD-ROM set. The limited edition came bundled with a special story book entitled Tsunderera. The regular edition was released on February 18, 2005, and one select lot of this version contained a limited edition sticker. An updated version with full voice acting was released on April 28, 2006, as a DVD. Another updated version compatible for Windows Vista/7 was released on May 27, 2011. The Windows version of Otoboku was released in English by MangaGamer on November 23, 2012.

Caramel Box released a fan disc of Otoboku on June 24, 2005, in a collection called Caramel Box Yarukibako, which contained additional scenarios that furthered the story from the original visual novel; the fan disc came with a small figurine. The collection was re-released under the title Caramel Box Yarukibako Fukkoku-ban on January 26, 2007. A second fan disc was released on October 19, 2007, in the collection Caramel Box Yarukibako 2, which again contained additional scenarios. Alchemist released a PlayStation 2 port on December 29, 2005, which removed the adult elements of the game. Additional scenarios were included in the PS2 version written by Kiichi Kanō. A version of the adult game featuring only Sion's scenario playable on iOS devices was released in six volumes between March 29 and June 4, 2010. A PlayStation Portable (PSP) version titled Otome wa Boku ni Koishiteru Portable was released on April 29, 2010, by Alchemist.

=== Sequel ===
A sequel to the visual novel titled Otome wa Boku ni Koishiteru: Futari no Elder (処女はお姉さまに恋してる ～2人のエルダー～) was released as an adult game on June 30, 2010, as a limited edition, playable on a Windows PC as a DVD. The same staff that worked on Otoboku returned for the sequel. The limited edition came bundled with a 96-page guide book, an original card from the Lycèe Trading Card Game, and an original pouch. A free game demo of Futari no Elder can be downloaded at the game's official website. The regular edition was released on July 30, 2010. Settings and characters from Sakura no Sono no Étoile, a novel written by the scriptwriter of Otoboku as a sequel to Takako's story, appear in Futari no Elder. Also, the release date of June 30 coincides in-story with the day of the election day of the 75th Elder sister. A PSP version titled Otome wa Boku ni Koishiteru Portable: Futari no Elder was released on April 28, 2011, by Alchemist. A downloadable version of the PSP release via the PlayStation Store was released by Alchemist on December 1, 2011.

A second sequel titled Otome wa Boku ni Koishiteru: Trinkle Stars (処女はお姉さまに恋してる 3つのきら星) was released as an adult game on February 23, 2018, for Windows PC.

== Related media ==
=== Novels ===
Two novels written based on the original game written by Saki Murakami and published by Paradigm were released in Japan in June and August 2005. The first released was Toraware no Himegimi: Sion-hen (囚われの姫君～紫苑編～, Imprisoned Princess: Sion Chapter) centering on Sion, with the second entitled Tomadou Juliet: Takako-hen (とまどうジュリエット～貴子編～, Perplexed Juliet: Takako Chapter) centering on Takako. These novels contain erotic content. A single volume titled Otome wa Boku ni Koishiteru written by Chihiro Minagawa with accompanying illustrations by Ume Aoi was published by Jive in August 2005, and centers on Takako's scenario. Sion's scenario was ported to the iPhone as an e-book between March 29 and June 4, 2010, by DML. A semi official dōjin novel was written by the original scenario writer for the game, Aya Takaya, called Sakura no Sono no Étoile (櫻の園のエトワール; lit. Étoile in the Cherry Orchard), with illustrations by the original game artist Norita. The novel contains a two short stories that is a sequel of Takako's scenario, and Kana and Yukari have little sisters. The revised and completed edition of the dōjin novel was published as an official novel by Enterbrain on December 25, 2007.

Three volumes based on Futari no Elder were written by Tasuku Saiga and published by Paradigm between September 30, 2010, and January 19, 2011. The first volume centers on Kaoruko Nanahara, the second is around Kaori Kamichika, and the third centers on Utano Sasou. A single volume written by Reiji Mai titled Knight no Kimi no Love Romance (騎士の君のラブロマンス, Love Affair of You, the Knight) was published by Kill Time Communication on December 3, 2010. These four novels contain erotic content. Three volumes written by Aya Takaya were released by SoftBank Creative between December 15, 2010, and January 15, 2012. The first volume titled Futari no Elder (二人のエルダー) is the story until Chihaya Kisakinomiya and Kaoruko Nanahara are elected as Elders; the second titled Madogoshi no Ihōjin (窓越しの異邦人, The Stranger Through the Window) is the story until the end of first term and it mainly focuses Kaoruko Nanahara, You Kashiwagi and Hatsune Minase; and the third titled Kin no Ori, Ibara no Torikago (黄金の檻 荊の鳥籠, lit. The Golden Cage, The Birdcage of Thorns) is the story between summer vacation and September and it mainly focuses Awayuki Reizei and Utano Sasou. There were five novels published by Multi Bunko between June 30, 2011, and March 29, 2012: three volumes written by Tasuku Saiga are around Utano Sasou, Fumi Watarai and Awayuki Reizei; one volume written by Ricotta is around Kaoruko Nanahara; and a volume written by Mitsuru Iiyama is not dependent on any heroine's scenario. These eight novels are not erotic.

=== Manga ===
A manga adaptation is illustrated by Kanao Araki and was serialized in ASCII Media Works' magazine Dengeki Daioh between the November 2006 and August 2008 issues in Japan. Two tankōbon volumes were released under ASCII Media Works' Dengeki Comics imprint, the first on August 27, 2007, and the second on September 27, 2008. A four panel comic strip manga was published by Enterbrain in 12 comics anthologies released between March 26, 2007 and March 25, 2009.

A manga adaptation of Futari no Elder illustrated by Akuru Uira was serialized between the July 2010 and February 2012 issues of Kadokawa Shoten's Comp Ace. Three volumes were published between November 26, 2010, and January 26, 2012. Three volumes of a four panel, comic strip manga of Futari no Elder were published by Enterbrain between September 26, 2010, and January 29, 2011. Two comic anthologies were released by Ichijinsha between October 25 and November 25, 2010.

=== Internet radio show ===
An Internet radio show to promote the anime series was broadcast between October 5, 2006, and March 27, 2008, called the Seio Girls' Academy Broadcasting Station (聖應女学院放送局, Seiō Jogakuin Hōsōkyoku). It aired every Thursday hosted by Miyu Matsuki and Yuko Goto who played Sion Jujo and Ichiko Takashima in the anime, respectively; it was produced by Animate TV. There are thirteen corners, or parts, to the program which correspond to the general life of the characters in the story, and 74 episodes were produced. There were several guests to the show such as Chiaki Takahashi in episodes six and seven as Takako Itsukushima, Akemi Kanda in episodes eleven and twelve as Kana Suoin, Ayano Matsumoto in episodes fifteen and sixteen as Yukari Kamioka, and Madoka Kimura in episodes nineteen and twenty as Kimie Sugawara. The radio show episodes were released on four CDs released between May 9, 2007 and February 6, 2008.

=== Anime ===
An anime adaptation is produced by the animation studio Feel, written by Katsumi Hasegawa, directed by Munenori Nawa, and features character design by Noriko Shimazawa who based the designs on Norita's original concept. The anime contained twelve episodes which aired between October 6 and December 24, 2006, on several UHF networks including TV Kanagawa and Chiba TV. The episodes were released on four DVD compilations released in Japan as limited and regular editions. A single original video animation (OVA) episode was released on the final limited edition DVD on April 4, 2007. Media Blasters released the series, including the OVA, as English-subtitled DVDs between June 24 and October 7, 2008, under the title Otoboku: Maidens Are Falling For Me!.

A three-episode OVA adaptation of Futari no Elder is produced by the animation studio Silver Link, directed by Shinya Kawatsura, written by Michiko Yokote, and features character design by Keiichi Sano who based the designs on Norita's original concept. The episodes were released on three Blu-ray Disc/DVD volumes between August 29 and October 24, 2012.

An OVA adaptation of Trinkle Stars is produced by EXNOA with animation by Blue Bread, directed by Fumio Ito, written by Misato Tōsaka, and features character design by Tatsuya Takahashi who based the designs on Norita's original concept. It was originally set to be released on December 24, 2021, but was delayed to January 28, 2022, due to production issues.

=== Music and audio CDs ===
The Otome wa Boku ni Koishiteru visual novel has three theme songs: the opening theme "You Make My Day!" by Yuria, the ending theme "Itoshii Kimochi" (いとしいきもち) by Yui Sakakibara, and "Sayonara no Sasayaki" (さよならの囁き) by Sakakibara as an insert song. The original soundtrack for the visual novel titled Maiden's Rest was released in Japan on February 25, 2005, by Digiturbo. The Futari no Elder visual novel has four theme songs: an opening theme, an ending theme, and two insert songs. For the Windows version of Futari no Elder, the opening theme is "Underhanded Girl" (アンダーハンデッド・ガール) by Yuria, and the ending theme is "Hidamari no Naka e" (陽だまりの中へ) by Aki Misato. For the PSP version of Futari no Elder, the opening theme is "Crystal Wish" by Miyuki Hashimoto, and the ending theme is "Tamerai, Fuwari" (ためらい、ふわり。) by Shiori. The insert songs, both sung by Sakakibara, are "Utsuriyuku Hana no Yōni" (移りゆく花のように) and "Kimi no Mama de" (君のままで). An album was released containing the theme songs for the Windows version of Futari no Elder on May 26, 2010, by Lantis. A single was released containing the theme songs for the PSP version of Futari no Elder on April 27, 2011, by Lantis.

Two singles were released for the opening and ending themes for the anime adaptation. The first called "Love Power" by Aice^{5} contained the opening theme of the same name. The other single entitled "Again" by Yui Sakakibara contained the ending theme entitled "Beautiful Day". The A-side track from that single entitled "Again" was used as an insert song in episode eleven. Both singles were released on October 25, 2006, by King Records. The soundtrack for the anime was released on November 22, 2006, by King Records. Three character image song albums were released sung by voice actors from the anime adaptation. The first album was by Yui Horie as Mizuho Miyanokouji, Miyu Matsuki as Sion Jujo and Masumi Asano as Mariya Mikado. The second album featured Ayano Matsumoto as Yukari Kamioka, Akemi Kanda as Kana Suoin and Yuko Goto as Ichiko Takashima. The third album was recorded by Chiaki Takahashi as Takako Itsukushima, Madoka Kimura as Kimie Sugawara and Yui Sakakibara as Hisako Kajiura. These CDs were released between July 26 and September 21, 2006.

Seven drama CDs based on Otoboku have also been produced. The first was based on the visual novel and was released on September 22, 2005. Four more based on the Otoboku anime adaptation were released between October 25, 2006, and April 11, 2007. A drama CD based on the novel Sakura no Sono no Étoile was released on January 29, 2010. The last one was based on a special episode contained in the fan disc Caramel Box Yarukibako with voice actors from anime adaptation released on January 29, 2010.

== Reception ==
According to a national ranking of how well bishōjo games sold nationally in Japan, the Otome wa Boku ni Koishiteru limited edition Windows release premiered at number two in the rankings. The limited edition achieved a ranking of four out of 50 in the ranking for the next two weeks. The regular edition Windows release premiered at number six in the rankings, and stayed in the top 50 for a month and a half until mid-April 2005. The regular edition was again in the rankings for May 2005, managing to rank in at 38 and 49. The Otome wa Boku ni Koishiteru Windows edition playable as a DVD premiered at number 13 in the rankings and stayed at that rank for the next listing. The DVD edition ranked twice more over the next month: the first at 43 and the last at 33. From May to June 2010, Otome wa Boku ni Koishiteru: Futari no Elder ranked third in national PC game pre-orders in Japan. Futari no Elder ranked second in terms of national sales of PC games in Japan in June 2010.

The English version of the original visual novel by MangaGamer was reviewed by Nicholas E. Mendes of NookGaming, who felt it had not aged well in some aspects, but was positive about the drama and comedy. In particular, he was surprised about the lack of dependency on tropes, despite having several characters that could easily fit into one.

The first two anime DVD volumes released by Media Blasters were reviewed by Anime News Network. In the review of the first DVD, the reviewer Carl Kimlinger generally panned the volume, commenting how the three episodes were "cruelly unimaginative" where "afterwards it's one long slide into a torturous hell of girls' school tripe where not even humor or romance can pierce the veil of pain." The Catholic girls' school premise is likened to Maria-sama ga Miteru and Strawberry Panic!, and is considered to be used "merely as visual spice". For the second DVD volume, Kimlinger wrote that "while the onslaught of squealing, caffeinated moe-bait has abated somewhat in its ferocity, a sagging of the already listlessly undirected plot ensures that the series' sophomore outing is only marginally more tolerable than the first." Further, the series is described as having "obnoxious quirks and technical shortcomings".

The first two anime DVD volumes released by Media Blasters were also reviewed by Mania Entertainment. In the review of the first DVD, the reviewer Chris Beveridge felt the anime reminded him of "parts of Princess Princess, especially when it came to the Elder status piece. It's even reminiscent of Strawberry Panic in this way." The series is described as "all about the "moe" factor, bringing about an atmosphere that makes you like the characters, care about them and feel good about seeing them interact. It does it well even if it doesn't have an amazing hook." For the second DVD volume, Beveridge commented that the series continues to be "very predictable and bland" which is "at this point fun but entirely forgettable". Beveridge also wrote how "the characters are all pleasant, nicely designed and with mildly interesting personalities that could lead to something more but never does."

== Notes and references ==
- ^{A} Sion is officially romanized in the Kunrei-shiki manner, instead of the more common Hepburn manner.
