= Battle Spirits: Shounen Toppa Bashin =

Japanese anime television series and franchise

- バトルスピリッツ少年突破バシン
- Genre: Adventure
- Created by: Hajime Yatate
- Written by: Dai Satō
- Directed by: Mitsuru Hongo
- Music by: Kow Otani
- Country of origin: Japan
- Original language: Japanese
- No. of episodes: 50

Production
- Producers: Kenichi Kawamoto (Nagoya TV); Fumikuni Furusawa (Sunrise)
- Production companies: Nagoya TV; Sunrise (Note: As of 2015, the copyright for this work was transferred to Bandai Namco Pictures.); Asatsu-DK

Original release
- Network: ANN (Nagoya TV, TV Asahi)
- Release: September 7, 2008 – September 6, 2009

Related
- Manga
- Written by: Hideaki Fujii
- Published by: Kadokawa Shoten
- Magazine: Kerokero Ace
- Original run: July 2008 – September 2009
- Volumes: 4
- Novel

Battle Spirits Shomen Tanteidan!
- Written by: Tatsuya Hamazaki
- Illustrated by: Hideaki Fujii
- Published by: Kadokawa Tsubasa Bunko
- Published: July 15, 2009

Battle Spirits: Shounen Toppa Bashin (バトルスピリッツ少年突破バシン, Batorusupirittsu Shōnen Toppa Bashin; lit. 'Battle Spirits: Boy Breakthrough Bashin') is a 2008 Japanese anime series based on the Battle Spirits Trading Card Game. It was produced by Sunrise and Nagoya Broadcasting Network and aired on TV Asahi from September 7, 2008, to September 6, 2009. It replaced Dinosaur King in the Nichi Asa Kids Time 7:00 timeslot and was succeeded by Battle Spirits: Shounen Gekiha Dan. It has been licensed in China, Thailand, and the Philippines.

== Plot ==
The story follows the day-to-day adventures of an optimistic and energetic young boy nicknamed Bashin. Along with his card battler friends, he aims to be the very best at Battle Spirits. However, to accomplish that, they must defeat Nazo Otona (ナゾオトナ; lit. Mysterious Adults) throughout the world, obtain X-rare cards to build the greatest deck, and take down King Uchuuchouten.

== Characters ==
=== Pyroxene Card Battlers ===
Chosen card battlers that each possess a pyroxene (輝石, kiseki) stone (alternatively translated as "cornerstone"). The stones have the power to release Isekai World (イセカイ界, Isekai Kai), an alternate dimension where spirits truly exist, and allow their respective pets to speak. In the final tournament, they refer to themselves as Team Shomen Toppa (チームショーメン突破, Chīmu Shōmen Toppa)

Bashin (バシン) / Toppa Bashin (馬神トッパ, Bashin Toppa)
Voiced by: Mutsumi Tamura
X-rares： The DragonEmperor Siegfried, The TwinRowdy Diranos, The Gigantic Thor, The GiantHero Titus, The SacredEmperor Siegfrieden

The protagonist. Bashin is a 12-year-old who is very passionate about Battle Spirits, though this singularity of mind often makes him oblivious to the people around him. He is at times rude, but often has good intentions. He lives with his mother Hayami and pet mouse Aibou, and his father left home when he was young. Initially he attends Toaru Elementary School but in episode 29 he advances to Toaru Middle School where he joins the Battle Spirits Club with Striker, Meganeko, Smile, and Seven. His catchphrase is "I'll break through from the front and total ___!" (正面突破で○○突破トウォォタル！, Shomen-toppa de ○○ touootaru!) Bashin uses an exclusively red deck in the beginning, adding more colors as the series continues. He possesses the oval-shaped red pyroxene stone, which was given to him by his father.

J Sawaragi (澤ラギJ, Sawaragi J) / Juli Sawaragi (澤ラギジュリー, Sawaragi Juri)
Voiced by: Kaya Miyake
X-rares: The ImpregnableFortress Odin, The Gigantic Thor, The DarkDragonEmperor Siegfried, The SacredEmperor Siegfrieden

Bashin's rival. J is the "Noble Youth of the Battle Spirits World," winning championship after championship and has a large number of fans. He is also very rich, as his father is head of an electronics firm, and is chauffeured everywhere. He lives with his parents, sister Kyouka, and pet cat Okyou, but his father is often busy. He has a cold personality, though warms up with the influence of Kyouka and Bashin. He attends Tonari Private Middle School starting in episode 29, but later withdraws to enter the Thousand Spirits Group as No. 11, Jack Knight (ジャックナイト, Jyakku Naito). In episode 42 he resigns from the Group and becomes an official member of Team Shomentoppa. J uses a primarily white deck, and possesses the oval-shaped white pyroxene stone.

Suiren (スイレン) / My Sunshine (マイサンシャイン, Mai Sanshain)
Voiced by: Ayahi Takagaki
X-rares: The SevenShogun Desperado, The SevenShogun Destlord, The GreatArmoredLord Deathtaurus

A mysterious card battler, Suiren's true identity is that of the popular idol My Sunshine. While My Sunshine has a very bright and cheery personality, Suiren is somewhat rude and overbearing. Her pet chameleon Pink allows her to transform into Suiren, but her mask is separate. Suiren reveals her identity to the other pyroxene holders in episode 17, explaining that her image as an idol restricts her from playing a boyish game like Battle Spirits. This restriction is eventually rescinded, but as My Sunshine her deck is full of cute rather than strong cards. As she gets friendlier with the other pyroxene holders, her personalities become closer together. As Suiren she uses a primarily purple deck, while as My Sunshine she uses a yellow deck. She possesses the heart-shaped purple pyroxene stone, which she found in her homeland of Hawaii under the sea.

Striker (ストライカー, Sutoraikā) / Kakeru Nohara (ノ原カケル, Nohara Kakeru)
Voiced by: Ryosuke Sakamaki
X-rares: The Duke Kingtaurus, The SavageKnight Hercules, The GreatArmoredLord Deathtaurus

The former star player of Toaru Elementary School's soccer team, who stops playing due to a leg injury. In the hospital, Hayami teaches him how to play Battle Spirits, thus awakening him as a pyroxene card battler. Striker is typically optimistic and sensible, but becomes excited easily about soccer, Battle Spirits, or My Sunshine. He lives with his parents, younger brothers, and pet parakeet Cap. Striker uses a primarily green deck, and possesses the V-shaped green pyroxene stone.

Meganeko (メガネコ) / Fumiko Otonashi (音無フミコ, Otonashi Fumiko)
Voiced by: Akemi Kanda
X-rares: The ArcAngelia Valiero, The PhantomLord Rean

Bashin's childhood friend, Meganeko is an initially shy, quiet glasses-wearing girl. She is a victim of Bashin's enthusiasm, as he often is too absorbed in Battle Spirits to pay attention to her. To rectify this, she has Card Sensei teach her Battle Spirits and enters a tournament as Kiiroko (キイロコ). Though she loses to Bashin, she is awakened as a pyroxene card battler. After this, she begins to wear contacts instead of glasses and associates with the other pyroxene card battlers. Meganeko uses a primarily yellow deck, and possesses the butterfly-shaped yellow pyroxene stone.

Kyouka Sawaragi (澤ラギキョーカ, Sawaragi Kyōka)
Voiced by: Maya Nishimura
X-rares: The ImpregnableFortress Odin, The GiantHero Titus, The HugeBeastLord Behedoth

The younger twin sister of J, Kyouka is an amicable and humorous girl who cares deeply for her brother. While not a chosen battler until very late in the series, she knows about the pyroxene stones through J and Okyou and becomes a part of Bashin's circle of friends. Having been brought up in Kyoto, she has an Osakan accent. Kyouka uses a variety of colors throughout the show and is given the hexagonal blue pyroxene stone by Card Sensei in episode 44.

=== Pets ===
Aibou (アイボウ)
Voiced by: Rie Nakagawa

Bashin's pet mouse, who gains the ability to speak in episode 1. Aibou is rather feisty and tends to nag at Bashin for his shortcomings.

Okyou (お京) / Queen (クイーン, Kuīn)
Voiced by: Akiko Kimura

J's pet cat, who has a strong rivalry with Aibou.

Pink (ピンク, Pinku)
Voiced by: Chō

Suiren's pet chameleon, who has the ability to turn invisible.

Cap (キャップ, Kyappu)
Voiced by: Takayuki Sasada

Striker's pet parakeet. Before the green pyroxene stone awakened, Cap was able to speak some phrases, but had no understanding of human words.

Nanarin (ナナリン)
Voiced by: Misato Fukuen

Kitan and Meganeko's pet dog. After Meganeko receives the yellow pyroxene stone, Nanarin begins to speak.

Guraguri (ぐらぐり)
Voiced by: Michiko Neya

Card Sensei's master, who was for a time the class pet of Bashin's elementary class.

=== Bashin Family ===
Hayami Bashin (馬神ハヤ美)
Voiced by: Tomoko Kawakami (1–31), Akiko Kimura (32–50)

Bashin's mother, usually referred to as Mama, who works as a taxi driver. She is strict with Bashin and concerned about his well-being, but she still loved her son so much. Hayami frequently gives her passengers advice when they appear troubled. She taught Bashin how to play Battle Spirits to cure his introversion, and later teaches Striker how to play so he can get over his depression. In the past she was a well-known masked card battler known as Mama the Speed Star (ママ・ザ・スピードスター, Mama za SupīdoSutā).

Touha Bashin (馬神トーハ, Bashin Tōha)
Voiced by: Tomoyuki Shimura

Bashin's father, who left his family to explore the world. Touha called Bashin "Aibou", meaning "partner", when he was young, and in turn Bashin named his mouse Aibou when Touha left. In the past, he was part of an invincible masked card battler duo with Hayami. In the epilogue, he gives Bashin a new pyroxene stone before heading out to continue his journey around the world.

Papa Navi (パパナビ) / Supi-chan (スピちゃん)
Voiced by: Tomoyuki Shimura

An artificial intelligence system that controls non-driving functions in Hayami's taxi.

=== Sawaragi Foundation ===
Kiano Steven Sawaragi (キアノ・スティーブン・さわラギ, Kiano Sutībun Sawaragi)
Voiced by: Hirohiko Kakegawa
X-rares: The IceBeast Mam-Morl

J and Kyouka's father. He is frequently busy working as head of a large electronics firm. Soon after developing the tag battle system with Elliot, Kiano joined the Numbers Elite as No. 3. Due to this, he quarrels with J and J also joins the Thousand Spirits group as a result. After battling and losing to Bashin in a tournament, he leaves the Numbers to become closer to his family. Kiano is Finnish in descent and in the past was part of a masked battler duo with his sister.

Miyako Sawaragi (澤ラギミヤコ, Sawaragi Miyako)
Voiced by: Naomi Shindō

J and Kyouka's mother. At first she disapproves of J playing Battle Spirits, believing him to be obsessed with it and wasting his time. However, she becomes tolerant of it after J turns in her deck to her and Kyouka teaches her how to play. She is from Kyoto.

J's Aunt (Jの叔母, J no Oba)
Voiced by: Yukana

The elegant caretaker of Kiano Castle in Finland. She appears only in episode 28, though in episode 50 it is revealed that she and her brother Kiano formed a masked battler duo that was rivals with Hayami and Touha.

Chauffeur (運転手, Untenshu)
Voiced by: Tomohisa Asō

The Sawaragi family chauffeur who frequently drives J around the towns of Tonari and Toaru.

=== Toaru and Tonari Schools ===
Nanao Watanabe (渡辺ナナ男, Watanabe Nanao) / Seven (セブン, Sebun) Galaxy Seven (ギャラクシーセブン, Gyarakushī Sebun)
Voiced by: Daisuke Kishio
X-rares: The GiantHero Titus, The MobileFortress Castle Golem

A student at Toaru Middle School and the president of Toaru Middle School's BatoSupi club. Nanao is typically timid, but when in his Galaxy Seven persona, he is very confident and narcissistic. Before Bashin and the others joined, his club was populated by only himself, as all other members were frightened by him. Nanao joined the first incarnation of Team Shomen Toppa when J was Jack Knight, only to remove himself right before the tournament from a lack of confidence, and soon after reveals himself to be No. 7.

Setsuko Kirishima (キリ島セツ子, Kirishima Setsuko)
Voiced by: Misato Fukuen

The student council president of Tonari Private Middle School. Setsuko is very strict about the school rules and tries to prevent the Battle Spirits Club from forming because it could impede studying. After reluctantly acknowledging the club's establishment, she joins the Battle Spirits club so she can rival Kyouka's academic success.

Manabu (マナブ)
Voiced by: Wataru Hatano

The vice president of Tonari Private Middle School's student council. He is more relaxed about the studying than Setsuko, but typically follows her lead. Due to his admiration of Kyouka, he joins the Battle Spirits Club, becoming the last member needed for it to officially form.

=== Toaru City ===
Card Sensei (カードセンセ, Kādo Sense) / Kyoji Kawato (川戸キョーヂ, Kawato Kyōji)
Voiced by: Riki Kitazawa
X-rares: The Archangel Mikafar, The Arcangel Valiero

Bashin and Meganeko's elementary school teacher. Formerly No. 5 of the Thousand Spirits Group.

Kitan Otonashi (音無奇譚, Otonashi Kitan)
Voiced by: Toshihide Tsuchiya
X-rares: The Emperor Kaiseratlus, The PhantomLord Rean

Meganeko's grandfather. Formerly No. 10 of the Thousand Spirits Group.

Female Announcer (女子アナ, Onna Ana)
Voiced by: Misato Fukuen (1–3), Reiko Takagi (4–50)

BatoSupi TV's announcer. She appears to be enthusiastic about her job.

Commentator-san (解説さん, Kaisetsu-san)
Voiced by: Chō

BatoSupi TV's commentator. With Female Announcer, he covers Battle Spirits news and events.

Baito-kun (バイトくん) / Rokurouta Murai (村井ロクロータ, Murai Rokurōta)
Voiced by: Anri Katsu

A part-time worker at the Toaru Battle Spirits Center. In episode 33 he is shown to have joined the Thousand Spirits Group.

Baito-san (バイトさん)
Voiced by: Makiko Ohmoto

A part-time worker at the Toaru Battle Spirits Center. She formerly lived in the same apartment complex as Bashin and frequently babysat him. She takes over working at the Battle Spirits Center when Baito-kun leaves.

Manager (マネージャー, Manējyā)
Voiced by: Takayuki Sasada

My Sunshine's manager, who often is troubled by her tendency to disappear before concerts.

Pseudo-J (Jもどき, J Modoki)
Voiced by: Kenji Nojima

An actor who portrays J in the Pretty Girl Breakthrough My Sunshine movie.

=== Thousand Spirits Group ===
A mysterious organization. Its members, dubbed Nazo Otona (ナゾオトナ; lit. Mysterious Adults) by children, are said to distribute X-Rares and High Ranker Passes to those that defeat them. The top members of the group are the Numbers Elite (ナンバーズエリート).

== Media ==
=== Anime ===
Battle Spirits: Shounen Toppa Bashin aired on TV Asahi from September 7, 2008, to September 6, 2009, on the 7:00 NichiAsa timeslot. It replaced Dinosaur King in the 7:00 NichiAsa timeslot and was succeeded by Battle Spirits: Shounen Gekiha Dan. Many of the episode titles mix kanji and kana in unconventional ways to create dual meanings or tongue twisters.

No.	Title	Original release date
1	"Front Breaking Bashin Enters Stage!" "Shoumen Toppa Bashin Toujou!" (Japanese: 正面突破バシン登場!)	September 7, 2008
2	"The Rival's Name is J" "Raibaru no Na wa J" (Japanese: ライバルの名はJ)	September 14, 2008
3	"Parents Day in the Stormy Course of Life" "Haran Banjyō Jugyou Sankan" (Japanese: 波乱バンジョー授業参観)	September 21, 2008
4	"The Idol is My Sunshine" "Aidoru wa Mai Sanshain" (Japanese: アイドルはマイサンシャイン)	September 28, 2008
5	"The Athletics Meet is Trouble" "Undoukai ga Taihen da" (Japanese: 運動会がタイヘンだ)	October 5, 2008
6	"Card Battler Hospital Visit" "Kādobatorā no Omimai" (Japanese: カードバトラーのお見舞い)	October 12, 2008
7	"Shut up the Uproar" "Urusai Toko de Oosawagi" (Japanese: ウルサいトコでオオ騒ぎ)	October 19, 2008
8	"Break Through from the Front at the Field Trip" "Shuugakuryokou mo Shoumen Toppa" (Japanese: 修学旅行も正面トッパ)	October 28, 2008
9	"Okyou's Labyrinth?" "Okyou no Mei Q?" (Japanese: お京の迷Q?)	November 2, 2008
10	"Big Maze is Big Trouble" "Dai Meiro de Dai Meiwaku" (Japanese: ダイ迷路でダイ迷惑)	November 9, 2008
11	"The Great Batosupi Operation" "Batosupi Daisakusen" (Japanese: バトスピ大作戦)	November 16, 2008
12	"Unidentified Unknown Invitation" "Shoutai Fumē no Shoutai Fumē" (Japanese: 招待フメーの正体フメー)	November 23, 2008
13	"Arrival of the Gunslinger's Apparition!" "Shutsugen Gansuringā no Mamono!" (Japanese: 出現ガンスリンガーの魔物!)	November 30, 2008
14	"First Final is Smile After Tears" "Hatsu Fainaru wa Namida nochi Sumairu" (Japanese: 初ファイナルはナミダのちスマイル)	December 7, 2008
15	"A Faulted Perfect Christmas" "Nanten Manten Kurisumasu" (Japanese: 難点満点クリスマス)	December 14, 2008
16	"The Day Aibou Disappeared" "Aibou no Kieta Hi" (Japanese: アイボウの消えた日)	December 21, 2008
17	"My First Sunshine" "Mai Fāsuto Sanshain" (Japanese: マイファーストサンシャイン)	January 4, 2009
18	"Break Through From the Front in Winter" "Fuyu Shōmen Toppa" (Japanese: 冬ショーメン突破)	January 11, 2009
19	"Thrilling Tag Rivals" "Taggu Tsukai Raibaruzu" (Japanese: タッグ痛快ライバルズ)	January 18, 2009
20	"A Broken Friendship is a Constant Disagreement" "Zetsu kou chū wa Zetsu fu chō" (Japanese: 絶交ちゅーは絶不ちょー)	January 25, 2009
21	"My Sunshine Valentine" "Mai Sanshain Barentain" (Japanese: マイサンシャインバレンタイン)	February 1, 2009
22	"Being a Nazo Otona was His Secret" "Nazo Otona ni datte Himitsu" (Japanese: ナゾオトナにだってヒミツ)	February 8, 2009
23	"Last Days as an Elementary Schooler" "Rasuto Shougakusei Deizu" (Japanese: ラスト小学生デイズ)	February 15, 2009
24	"Spring Batosupi – A Yellow Storm" "Haru no Batosupi Kiiroi Arashi" (Japanese: 春のバトスピキイロい嵐)	February 22, 2009
25	"A Flash of Light – The Pyroxene's Awakening" "Kirari Kiseki no Mezame" (Japanese: キラリ輝石の目覚め)	March 1, 2009
26	"Batosupi Under the Cherry Blossoms" "Sakura no shita de Batosupi wo" (Japanese: サクラの下でバトスピを)	March 8, 2009
27	"Pink and Amade Us" "Pinku to Amadeusu" (Japanese: ピンクとアマデウス)	March 15, 2009
28	"J, Trip to a Town of Romance" "J, Machi Roman no Tabi" (Japanese: J、街ろまんの旅)	March 22, 2009
29	"Middle School Uniforms New School Uniforms" "Chū Gakuran Nyū Gakuran" (Japanese: ちゅー学ラン・ニュー学ラン)	March 29, 2009
30	"Thriving Spirits Batosupi Club" "Hanjō Konjou Batosupi Bu" (Japanese: ハンジョー根性バトスピ部)	April 5, 2009
31	"Batosupi with the Student Council President" "Batosupi wo Seitokaichou to" (Japanese: バトスピを生徒会長と)	April 12, 2009
32	"A Letter from the Speed Star" "Supīdosutā kara no Tegami" (Japanese: スピードスターからの手紙)	April 19, 2009
33	"Aim for the Weak Point for the Advisor!" "Uīkupointo de Komon wo Nerae!" (Japanese: ウィークポイントでコモンを狙え!)	April 26, 2009
34	"The Treacherous Training Camp Jack" "Uragiri no Gasshuku Jyakku" (Japanese: 裏切りの合宿ジャック)	May 3, 2009
35	"Break Through From the Front of Tests and Fathers" "Tesuto mo Oyaji mo Shōmen Toppa" (Japanese: テストもオヤジもショーメントッパ)	May 10, 2009
36	"Hot Blooded Batosupi Club at the Capital" "Nekketsu Batosupi Bu Kyou he" (Japanese: 熱血バトスピ部・京へ)	May 17, 2009
37	"The Spirit of Aibou's Group" "Aibou-tachi no Supiritto" (Japanese: アイボウたちのスピリット)	May 24, 2009
38	"Rapid Loop Pool" "Pūru de Rūpu Gekiryuu" (Japanese: プールでループ・激流)	May 31, 2009
39	"Deep Close Contact with the Opponent – The Curtain Raised?" "Chīmu Taikou Dai Nessen Kaimaku?" (Japanese: チーム対抗ダイ熱戦・開幕?)	June 7, 2009
40	"Break Through – The Space Between Family and Team" "Toppa Famirī to Chīmu no Aida de" (Japanese: 突破・ファミリーとチームの間で)	June 14, 2009
41	"Confrontation! Black Knight and Queen will Definitely be Finished" "Taiketsu Kuroi Kishi to Jou wo Zettai Zetsumei ni" (Japanese: 対決・黒い騎士と女王を絶タイ絶メイに)	June 28, 2009
42	"Settlement – In Jack's Night, Death is Rebirth" "Kecchaku Jakku no Yoru Shi to Saisei wo" (Japanese: 決着・ジャックの夜に死と再生を)	July 5, 2009
43	"The Revived Master is a Blue Comet" "Fukkatsu no Shishou wa Burū Kometto" (Japanese: 復活の師匠はブルーコメット)	July 19, 2009
44	"Surfing, Sun, and Striker" "Naminori Taiyou Sutoraikā" (Japanese: 波ノリ太陽ストライカー)	July 26, 2009
45	"Break Through From the Front in Summer" "Natsu Shōmen Toppa" (Japanese: 夏ショーメン突破)	August 2, 2009
46	"The Pyroxene Six – Disappearance the Day Before the Finals" "Kiseki no Rokunin Kessen Zenya no Yukuefumē" (Japanese: キセキの6人・決勝前夜のゆくえフメー)	August 9, 2009
47	"Break Through From the Front Showtime – The Curtain Raised!" "Shōmen Toppa Shōtaimu Kaien!" (Japanese: ショーメン突破ショータイム・開演！)	August 16, 2009
48	"The Last Opponent, Nine – The Last Battle" "Saikyū Teki Nain Saikyō no Batoru" (Japanese: 最キュー敵ナイン・最キョーのバトル)	August 23, 2009
49	"Take it From the Life! Shine, Pyroxene's Settlement!!" "Raifu de Ukeru! Kirari Kiseki no Kecchaku!" (Japanese: ライフで受けろ！ギラリ輝石の決着!)	August 30, 2009
50	"Miracle Card Battler – Bashin Breaks Through From the Front!" "Kiseki no Kādobatorā Shomen Toppa Bashin!" (Japanese: 奇蹟のカードバトラー・正面突破バシン!)	September 6, 2009

=== Music ===
Opening theme

- "GO AHEAD!!"
  - Lyrics: Mitsuhiro Oikawa
  - Composition: TAKURO(GLAY)
  - Arrangement: CHOKKAKU
  - Performance: Mitsuhiro Oikawa
  - Episodes: 1–50

Ending themes

- "Adventure Record" (冒険記録, "Bouken Kiroku")
  - Lyrics: Little Non
  - Composition: Little Non
  - Arrangement: Masaki Suzuki
  - Performance: Little Non
  - Episodes: 1–26
- "dear-dear-DREAM"
  - Lyrics: Aki Hata
  - Composition: Katsuhiko Kurosu
  - Arrangement: Nijine
  - Performance: My Sunshine (Ayahi Takagaki) Meets Sphere
  - Episodes: 27–50

Insert Themes

- "Deep Breath" (冒険記録, "Shinkokyuu")
  - Lyrics: Little Non
  - Composition: Little Non
  - Arrangement: Noriyoshi Matsushita, Little Non
  - Performance: Little Non
  - Episode: 17
- "NEVER SURRENDER"
  - Lyrics: Mitsuhiro Oikawa
  - Composition: Mitsuhiro Oikawa
  - Arrangement: CHOKKAKU
  - Performance: Mitsuhiro Oikawa
  - Episodes: 33, 43, 44

=== Manga ===
A manga version by Hideaki Fujii was serialized in Kerokero Ace magazine beginning in July 2008 and ended in September 2009. The manga differs significantly from the anime.

No.	Japanese release date	Japanese ISBN
01	November 26, 2008	978-4047160064
01. "Burning Card" (燃えるカード, "Moeru Kādo"); 02. "Red Hot Storm" (灼熱の嵐, "Shakunetsu no Arashi"); 03. "J and Bashin" (Jとバシン, "J to Bashin"); 04. "High Speed vs. Break Through from the Front" (神速vs.正面突破, "Shinsoku vs. Shomen Toppa")
02	March 26, 2009	978-4047160125
05. "Showdown! Number Nine" (対決! ナンバーナイン, "Taiketsu! Nanbā Nain"); 06. "Striker Dances" (ストライカー舞う, "Sutoraika Mau"); 07. "X-Rare Clash!" (激突Xレア!, "Gekitotsu X Rea!"); 08. "Members Assembled" (集う者たち, "Tsudou monotachi")
03	July 23, 2009	978-4047160224
09. "Distorted World" (歪む世界, "Yugamu Sekai"); 10. "Stone Power" (イシノチカラ, "Ishi no Chikara"); 11. "Mingling Feelings" (交わる想い, "Majiwaru Omoi")
04	September 26, 2009	978-4047160231
12. "Smile" (スマイル, "Sumairu"); 13. "Unshakable Will" (揺るがない意志, "Yuruganai Ishi"); 14. "The Continuing World" (続く世界, "Tsuzuku Sekai")

A comic entitled Training! Bato☆Supi School (特訓！バト☆スピ学園, Tokkun! Bato☆Supi Gakuen) was also serialized on the official site, running for 21 chapters. It had no connection to the plot of Shounen Toppa Bashin asides from the appearance of Card Sensei.

=== Novel ===
A novel entitled Battle Spirits: Shomen Tanteidan (バトルスピリッツ ショーメン探偵団!, Batorusupirittsu Shōmen Tanteidan!; lit. Detective Agency from the Front) was published on July 17, 2009, by Kadokawa Tsubasa Bunko. It was written by Tatsuya Hamazaki and illustrated by Hideaki Fujii. A new student named Oriba (折場) has appeared in Bashin's class, but only Meganeko notices. Since then, a series of mysteries have occurred within the school which Bashin and Meganeko must solve.

=== Video games ===
While no games have been made featuring solely the cast of Shounen Toppa Bashin, two games including Shounen Toppa Bashin, Shounen Gekiha Dan, and game-original characters have been made. The first, Battle Spirits: Champion of Pyroxene (バトルスピリッツ 輝石の覇者, Batorusupirittsu Kiseki no Hasha) was released November 12, 2009, for the Sony PSP by Namco Bandai Games. The game takes place in Toaru City and revolves around Seiya Muteki (霧笛セイヤ, Muteki Seiya), a little league ace pitcher who admires Bashin and received a pyroxene stone from his mother. Card battles are shown in real time on a 3D field where the characters and spirits are rendered. On August 5, 2010, Namco Bandai Games also released Battle Spirits: Digital Starter (バトルスピリッツ デジタルスターター, Batorusupirittsu Degitaru Sutātā) for the Nintendo DS. The player character, Retsu Torai (渡雷烈, Torai Retsu), travels around Chikaba Town challenging other card battlers. Unlike the previous games, Battle Spirits is played as it is in real life. Characters from both Shounen Toppa Bashin and Shounen Gekiha Dan must be unlocked in order to battle them.
