= Yu Narukami =

Persona 4 video game character

- Persona character
- Yu Narukami in Persona 4 Arena accompanied by his Persona 'Izanagi'
- First game: Persona 4 (2008)
- Designed by: Shigenori Soejima
- Voiced by: EN: Johnny Yong Bosch (original), Nazeeh Tarsha (Revival); JA: Daisuke Namikawa
- Portrayed by: Toru Baba (Note: Persona 4 stage play); Keisuke Minami (Note: Persona 4 Arena & Persona 4 Arena Ultimax stage plays)

In-universe information
- Nationality: Japanese

Yu Narukami (Japanese: 鳴上 悠, Hepburn: Narukami Yū) is a character featured in the Persona series developed by Atlus. He serves as the main protagonist of the 2008 role-playing video game Persona 4. In the game, Yu is a silent protagonist, whose thoughts and actions are decided by the player. He is portrayed as a high school student who moves to the countryside region Inaba away from his city home, to live with his uncle Ryotaro Dojima and cousin Nanako while his parents are busy working overseas. Shortly after arriving in Inaba, Yu and his friends start investigating a serial murder case involving victims killed in the mysterious TV World, where he awakens his "Persona" — the physical manifestation of his subconscious spirit — in order to confront and defeat the "Shadows", the creatures who murdered the first victims. Yu has also appeared in other works related to Persona 4, including an anime adaptation, Persona 4: The Animation, a manga version, and several spin-off games. For these works, Yu received his own characterization and development in the stories.

Yu was designed by Shigenori Soejima who aimed to create an ambiguous character who could appeal to most players by way of reflecting several feelings towards them and through his mannerisms. For the anime, director Seiji Kishi expressed difficulties in giving the character emotions without damaging what the original staff created. The character is voiced by Daisuke Namikawa in Japanese, Johnny Yong Bosch in English in most appearances, and Nazeeh Tarsha in the game's remake, Persona 4 Revival. Both Namikawa and Bosch expressed difficulty in voicing him, with Namikawa finding his social life challenging while Bosch also had to voice another major character in the anime.

Yu has been positively received by critics, with his characterization, social life and being the subjects of praise due to his portrayal as a mostly silent teenager whose few lines are related to the plot and in some cases, a source of witty comedy. However, his anime adaptation with more soul and more lines was also received well as a different, less lifeless take on the character while staying true to the original Yu seen in the game.

== Character creation ==
Early designs from the character including the "Baby Face" in the bottom

Character designer Shigenori Soejima made Yu with the idea that his entire personality be decided and portrayed by the player's in-game actions and decisions. As a result, he wanted Yu to look more ambiguous than the male protagonist of Persona 3. Soejima compared Yu to the Blue Ranger from the Power Rangers franchise as such character tends to stand silent to follow the orders from his leader. His character design stayed relatively similar to its initial conception, with his tone and facial expressions changing the most. The feature Soejima focused on most was his eyes: he thought that having his eyes under the fringe of his hair would make him "look cool." The collar of his school uniform was made to stand a bit taller than other characters'. While designing the character, Soejima noted "the main character needs to be well-rounded enough to be likeable, but also needs that extra little something to make him stand out from the rest of the cast." He made a "baby face" sketch of the character so that he and the staff could discover Yu's "special something" and discuss what would make him stand out as the protagonist. In contrast to the Persona 3 protagonist who was seen as "shy" and "cute", Yu Narukami is meant to have far more different design which resulted in a smaller hair and "cool" eyes that in order to fit with the fact glasses he wears in TV World. This was primarily influenced by an unspecified Osamu Tezuka character who had a distinctive cool look while wearing glasses. Yu became the marketing core for the game as the fights in the game force the characters to wear glasses and thus Yu was drawn in order to avoid any dorky look. However, when compared with the rest of the characters, Soejima made less illustrations for the protagonist as he does not have a distinctive personality in the game due to most of his traits being made by the player.

In retrospective, Hashino claimed that Yu was written as a character who would be the driving force of the narrative, most notably to contrast how he is originally from a city with his coming to a country. As a result, when asked about why Persona 4 did not include an alternative female protagonist like Persona 3 Portable, Hashino felt it was because Yu would feel more natural as a result. Soejima also believes Narukami's appeal was too forced in retrospect and wanted the next lead, Joker from Persona 5 to be different from his predecessor.

Yu Narukami's base Persona is based on an entity from Japanese myths, Izanagi, in similar fashion to previous base Personas. The focus on Japanese myths is further explored in the game's climax where the final boss, Izanami, was based on Izanagi's wife from Japanese myths too. Izanagi's design was meant to convey a "manly" feeling but the artist felt it would be too cliche if the Persona looked like a high school student. While folklore stories of Izanagi have him with a pike, the Persona was meant to be given a giant knife as a weapon, giving him another manly element. The aspect of youth psychology was implemented in Izanagi's knife as in previous times, it was accepted that grown man would be allowed to wield weapons in the middle of the city. In the climax of the game, Izanagi evolves into Izanagi-no-Okami to defeat the final boss. Soejima aimed for the evolved Persona to look stronger than the original one. This was accomplished by giving him more pointy aspects. His new white outfit is also meant to reflect the idea of a more mature person. In regards to the protagonist's relationship with the culprit, Soejima sees him as a corrupted take on him, which resulted in his Persona being the nearly identical Magatsu no Izanagi. Izanagi ended up being Soejima's favorite Persona from the game due to the cool aspect of his squad-like uniform and his face. He said that Izanagi represents manliness even if he comes across as a stereotype.

=== Differences in adaptations ===
In the initial Persona 4 game, the main player-controlled character is known simply as the "Protagonist" or "Hero", whose name is decided by the player. The name "Yu Narukami" was first given to the character in the 2011 anime adaptation, Persona 4: The Animation, and has since been used in official games where the character is unable to be named by the player, beginning with Persona 4 Arena. Prior to this, he was given the name of Sōji Seta (瀬多 総司, Seta Sōji) in the game's manga adaptation. In an interview, game director Katsura Hashino drew attention to the way in which the Protagonist remains silent and emotionless throughout the game. This leaves the player to interpret the Protagonist's emotional reactions subjectively at any particular point. Hashino elaborated on this particular character trait becoming an obstacle for Persona 4: The Animation's director Seiji Kishi, since the character would undoubtedly have to speak and show some level of emotion. In the same interview, Kishi admitted the difficulty of transitioning the silent Protagonist into the anime without destroying what Hashino had already established.

A unique gesture of Yu's in the anime occurs when he unbuttons his school jacket when summoning a Persona for the first time. Kishi noted this as being a "key" moment of "opening something that was closed." However, he refrained from explaining its deeper meaning, leaving it instead as something for the viewers to ponder and hence helping them enjoy the adaptation much more. Another aspect made possible in the anime was Yu's cool and composed nature during battle scenes. Hashino elaborated that it was possible to create such an attitude by having the fighting solely done by the Personas, thus establishing Yu as an emotionally strong character—something which "would have lost its significance if he was given a weapon."

=== Casting ===
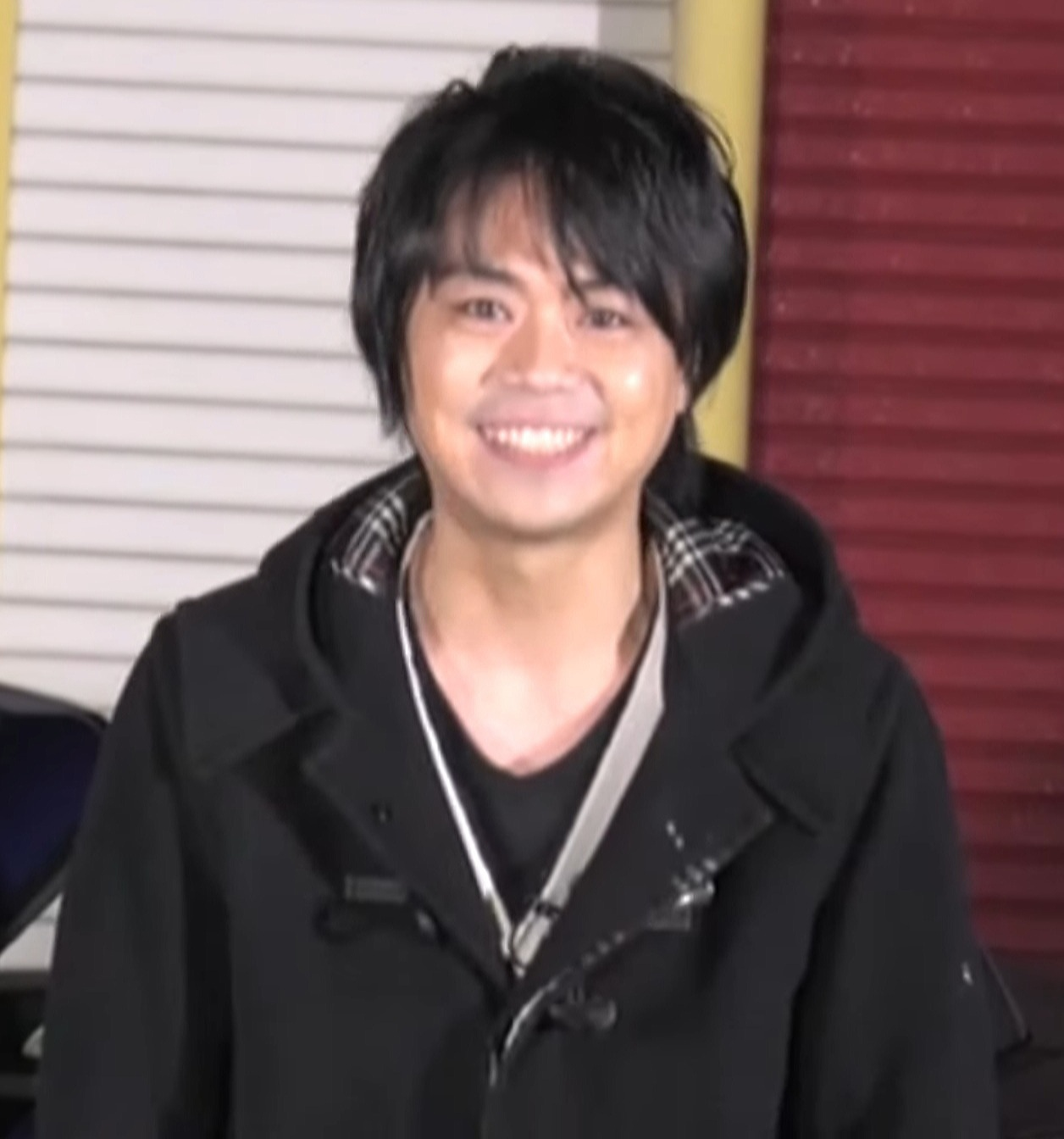
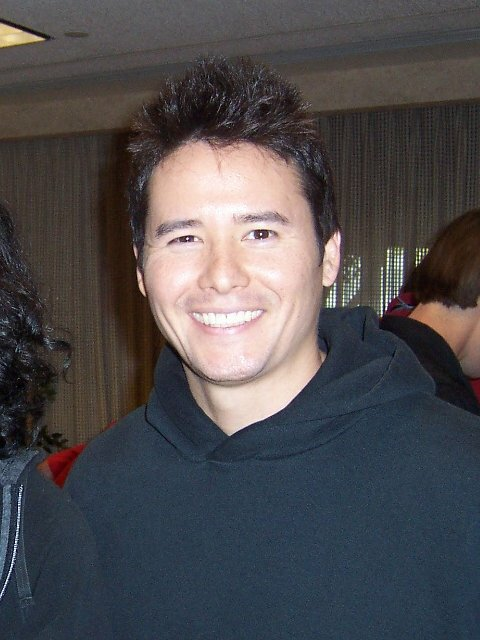
Daisuke Namikawa (left) and Johnny Yong Bosch (right) voiced Yu Narukami in Japanese and English respectively.

Yu's voice acting has been handled by Daisuke Namikawa in Japanese. Besides the game, Namikawa voiced the character in a drama CD before the anime's premiere. He considered Yu as an honest young man. However, he felt the Yu from the game and the anime to be completely different based on the directions he was given to act. In retrospective, Namikawa finds his work interesting due to the amount of actors he worked with. Since Narukami was a silent character in the video game, the actor felt his portrayal in the anime more challenging, and thus had to act more. He took a liking to both Yu's daily life as well as his fights in the TV World.

Johnny Yong Bosch voices the character in English. Bosch felt uneasy about voicing Yu due to the fact he also voiced another character from the game, Tohru Adachi. However, when he initially learned that the protagonist would have very few lines, his worry evaporated. It was first planned that Yu's voice actor for the anime would be recast, because he and Adachi would begin to interact several more times. However, in the end Bosch remained as the voice of Yu to avoid disappointing the fans. In order to solve the problem of having both of his characters sound too similar, he decided to speak in a lower register for Yu. Nazeeh Tarsha assumes the role for the English release of Persona 4 Revival.

== Appearances ==
=== In Persona 4 ===
In Persona 4, Yu is a high school student who moves to the countryside of Inaba to live with his uncle Ryotaro Dojima and cousin Nanako Dojima for a year as a result of his parents working abroad. He attends Yasogami High School where he meets most of the game's cast. Upon learning of the Midnight Channel's connection with the murders in Inaba, Yu gains access to the TV world, where he investigates the case alongside his friends and is appointed as their leader as a result of his experience. There he awakens his initial Persona, Izanagi (イザナギ), a swordsman wearing a black coat, which he uses to fight embodiments of humans' negative feelings, the Shadows.

Yu also has the unique "Wild Card" (ワイルド, Wairudo) ability, which allows him to swap Personas for use in battle. This is tied with the Social Links (Community (コミュニティ, Komyuniti) in Japan) mechanic: as Yu makes and strengthens his bonds with other characters he gains access to more and much stronger Personas, each named after one of the Major Arcana of the Tarot deck. Yu's own Arcana is The Fool, representing the group as a whole and personified by Izanagi, which later becomes the Judgement, when the Investigation Team realizes that Taro Namatame is not responsible for his actions and begin to seek out the real culprit behind the Inaba events (This bond is represented by the Persona Lucifer (ルシファー, Rushifā) in the anime). After closing the serial murder case, Yu learns he gained his powers from the goddess Izanami who had been posing as the Moel gas station attendant and aims to transform people into Shadows. Yu defeats Izanami by transforming Izanagi into Izanagi-no-Okami (伊邪那岐大神, Izanagi-no-Ōkami), representing The World, thanks to the power he gained from his many friends through Social Links. He then returns to his hometown, saying farewell to his friends.

=== In Persona 4 Arena and Arena Ultimax ===
In the fighting game Persona 4 Arena, set two months after the events of Persona 4, Yu returns to Inaba for a holiday reunion, but must go to the TV World alongside his remaining friends to investigate a fighting tournament promoted in the Midnight Channel, while finding some of their missing friends and acquires help from their predecessors, Kirijo Group's Shadow Operatives. As the group is unable to find the mastermind behind the competition, the Investigation Team and Shadow Operatives decides to search for him behind his kidnapping Aigis' older sister android Labrys. He fights using Izanagi, though during its strongest attack it transforms in Izanagi-no-Okami. His moveset was balanced for the sequel to make him more versatile as a result of comments regarding his character being too strong in the first game. The author behind Arena's manga, Aiyakyuu, said that Yu was his favorite character and that whenever he draws him he thinks "Yu is so cool!" Aiyakyuu also mentioned having trouble making the fight scene between Yu and Akihiko Sanada from Persona 3 as "Both characters wouldn't easily lose to anyone."

In Persona 4 Arena Ultimax, Yu reunites with both his friends and the Shadow Operatives to face a new threat of Shadows that appear in Inaba stealing powers from every Persona user and bring forth a second coming of Dark Hour. While Yu and his friends initially believe the culprit is a teenager with two split identities named Sho Minazuki, it is later revealed that the mastermind behind the fighting tournaments in the two Arena games is Kagutsuchi, a being that aims to destroy mankind. With help of his former enemy, Tohru Adachi, Yu manages to defeat Kagutsuchi, and helps Sho (who now lost his other half of his personality, despite finally gaining the ability to summon his half's Persona, Tsukuyomi) on how gain the trust of friendship through clashing their blades one last time before they depart in separate ways. Afterwards, Yu returns to his home and says goodbye to his friends.

=== Persona 4 adaptations ===
In the Persona 4 manga, he is named Sōji Seta (瀬多 総司, Seta Sōji) and is depicted as a distant but otherwise friendly teenager due having to move frequently as a result of his parents' changing careers. He is also a supporting character in the manga Persona 4: The Magician with the name of Yu Narukami. In the events of The Animation, Yu faces his own Shadow that reveals his repressed fear of moving away from Inaba and losing his friends, a fact that Yu accepts and acknowledges as the truth, enabling him to best Margaret in combat so he can face Izanami's true form. He later appears in Persona 4: The Golden Animation, which focuses on new events not featured in the previous series, showcasing some slight differences in personality from that of the previous series. In the live stage production, he was portrayed by Toru Baba and his name was chosen by the audience. He was later portrayed by Keisuke Minami in the Persona 4 Arena stage plays.

=== Other games ===
Yu appears alongside Persona 3's protagonist in the 2014 game, Persona Q: Shadow of the Labyrinth, in which he joins forces with the cast of Persona 3 to escape the mysterious labyrinth that they have been trapped inside of, while at the same time working to restore the memories of the mysterious Zen and Rei. Yu also appears in the rhythm game, Persona 4: Dancing All Night, where his friend Rise Kujikawa asks for his help. Yu also appears in Square Enix's arcade card game Lord of Vermilion Re:2 as a summon spell. He also appears in the fighting game BlazBlue: Cross Tag Battle. He appears as a costume for the Mii characters in Super Smash Bros. Ultimate. Yu also appears in the mobile game Star Ocean: Anamnesis as part of a cross over with the Persona series. Yu appears as a DLC boss fight in Persona 5 Royal.

== Reception ==
Yu's character has generally been well received. His role has been noted for allowing the player to build a unique "self" during the game while questioning their real-life identity. In Law, Culture and the Humanities, Ashley Pearson from Griffith University notes that while Narukami shares a similar to role other gaming protagonists involving connections with the player, Persona 4's protagonist and the supporting cast find themselves in conflict with their identities, most the concepts of Personas and Shadows, which gives the player major immersion in the narrative. The handling of Social Link further explores the idea of immersion as both the player and the protagonist are benefitted from interacting with the inhabitants from Inaba through a notable hero's journey that sends the message of how bonds with others are inescapable and necessary. Through conventional tropes often seen in fiction, the heroes manage to stop the villains from causing more deaths in Inaba and defeat the culprit behind it, Izanami. Izanami's conflict with the protagonist is further explored in Persona 4 Golden as the new love interest Marie is revealed to be related to Izanami and often interacts with him. In another article, there were mentions that Narukami does not make differences from common male avatars in gaming due to his portrayal as a heterosexual male with no encouragements to romantically interact with male characters and instead make more rewarding heterosexual interactions. This results in the player not wanting the avatar of Narukami and instead create an avatar resembling themselves, which might not attract female players. By drawing on textual elements of Persona 4, such as the game's plotline, among other areas the players find themselves as Narukami.

Although Narukami can only date women, there were several rumors about him starting a homosexual relationship with Yosuke Hanamura based on data from the original PlayStation 2 game. When Golden was ported to Steam, mods started leaking lines from Yosuke that imply that the Social Link between the protagonist and him could also lead to a romantic ending. FanByte considered this a sore spot for some queer Persona fans, as the recent games never properly addressed queer events seriously as Persona 4 themes involving apparent sexuality and gender norms were controversial while Persona 5 used homosexual characters in the form of comic relief. PC Gamer also praised the inclusion of a romantic relationship with Yosuke due to the game, and the franchise's, poor reputation when it comes to represent the LGBT themes and instead come across as homophobic. Among the several love interests the character can get involved, RPGFan found Chie the most likable partner as the options provided by the game allow Yu to be highly supportive to Chie's interests.

Kotaku's Jason Schreier called him "suave, handsome, and charming. He's friends with everyone, all the girls want to be with him, and in general, he's just an all-around badass." Additionally, the protagonist's relationships with his relatives that he starts to live with were praised for adding more variants to the relationships with these ones focusing on family relationships. Kimberley Wallace of Game Informer enjoyed his bond with his cousin Nanako due to how caring the latter becomes with him, especially with the nickname "big bro". Lucas M. Thomas of IGN found the bond between her and the player to be the strongest in the game. Patrick Hancock of Destructoid felt that one of Nanako's scenes with Yu was the most touching moment in Persona 4, noting that it made him cry. He also describes the familial love of a big brother to a little sister as one of the best shows of love in gaming. RPGFan described Narukami and Nanako as having one of the best sibling relationships in gaming due to how attached they are, contradicting previous games where children as despicted as bratty. Narukami and Adachi were compared by the Petra Christian University to Yin and Yang from Street Fighter as they possess contradictory character traits and represent a certain symbol on the society. Using Carl Gustav Jung’s theory of individuation, he said that they have contradictory character traits by looking through their Persona, Shadow, Ego, and Self.

The character's role in the anime adaptation of Persona 4 earned similar response. A reviewer from T.H.E.M. Anime Reviews commented that Yu "seems to be the aggregate of all the quirkiest possible choices you could make in the game," making him a likable character for his diverse scenes. When first watching the Persona 4 anime, Elliot Page from UK Anime Network noted that although Yu was not a silent character as in the video game, he had little dialogue and the pacing managed to make up for it. In a later review, Andy Hanley from the same site said he liked how the protagonist was handled, as the staff used his "blank state" to create comedic interactions. Briana Lawrence from the Fandom Post shared similar feelings, stating that the staff "somehow managed to give a silent protagonist a personality that's not only believable, but likable." Lawrence appreciated how the character was developed across the series thanks to all the bonds he forms into a "snarky, lovable main character who can keep a straight face while being kicked off a cliff." While also commenting how Yu manages to reinforce both the comical and "spooky" elements of the plot, Blu-ray's Jeffrey Kauffman noted he "remains something of a cipher throughout the series" with the possibility of having the viewer relate with him. In regards to his characterization in Golden The Animation, Narukami's social life was noted to be entertaining by Otaku USA and Anime Inferno although both reviewers were mixed in regards to its importance to viewers and balance it has with the more serious episodes.

In contrast to most reviewers, Richard Eisenbeis from Kotaku had mixed opinions about the character. Calling him "one of the oddest characters in any work of fiction ever", Eisenbeis found that his lack of backstory made it difficult for the viewer to predict his actions. However, he noted that, as well as being entertaining to watch, by the series' end, Yu had "become a character in his own right." However, he criticised Yu's characterization in Persona 4 Arena and its sequel for being a stereotypical lawful-good hero and less than a bland compared to the new character Sho Minazuki and Rise's development. Additionally, he was rated sixth in the category "Best Male Character" from the Newtype anime awards from 2012.
