= Persona 4: The Animation =

2011 anime television series

- Persona4 the ANIMATION
- Promotional artwork for the first Persona 4: The Animation television series featuring Yu Narukami (foreground), Yosuke Hanamura (left), Chie Satonaka (right), and Yukiko Amagi (background).
- Genre: Fantasy, mystery, supernatural
- Created by: Atlus
- Anime television series
- Directed by: Seiji Kishi
- Written by: Yūko Kakihara; Mitsutaka Hirota; Jun Kumagai
- Music by: Shoji Meguro
- Studio: AIC A.S.T.A.
- Licensed by: AUS: Madman Entertainment; NA: Sentai Filmworks (expired); Aniplex of America; UK: Kazé UK
- Original network: MBS, TBS, CBC, Animax
- English network: US: Anime Network
- Original run: October 7, 2011 – March 30, 2012
- Episodes: 25 + 1 OVA
- Anime film

Persona4 the ANIMATION -The Factor of Hope-
- Directed by: Seiji Kishi
- Written by: Yūko Kakihara; Mitsutaka Hirota; Jun Kumagai
- Music by: Shoji Meguro
- Studio: AIC A.S.T.A.
- Released: June 9, 2012
- Runtime: 86 minutes
- Anime television series

Persona4 the Golden ANIMATION
- Directed by: Seiji Kishi; Tomohisa Taguchi
- Written by: Jun Kumagai
- Music by: Tetsuya Kobayashi; Shoji Meguro
- Studio: A-1 Pictures
- Licensed by: AUS: Madman Entertainment; NA: Aniplex of America; SEA: Muse Communication
- Original network: MBS, TBS, CBC, BS-TBS
- Original run: July 11, 2014 – September 25, 2014
- Episodes: 12 + 1 OVA

Persona 4: The Animation, stylized as Persona4 the ANIMATION, is an anime television series based on Atlus' PlayStation 2 video game, Persona 4. The story revolves around Yu Narukami, a young teenager who moves to the town of Inaba, where a mysterious string of murders is taking place. Upon discovering a distorted TV World and acquiring a mysterious power known as "Persona", Yu and his friends decide to investigate the murders and save others from being killed.

The first series, produced by AIC ASTA and directed by Seiji Kishi, aired in Japan between October 2011 and March 2012 on MBS, TBS, CBC, and Animax, with an original video animation episode released in August 2012. A condensed film adaptation, Persona 4: The Animation -The Factor of Hope-, was released in Japanese theaters in June 2012. The series was licensed by Sentai Filmworks in North America and by Kazé UK in the United Kingdom. Critical reception to the anime series has been generally positive as it has been considered a faithful adaptation of the video game despite criticism of the pacing and animation issues. A second adaptation based on the game's PlayStation Vita port, titled Persona 4: The Golden Animation, aired in Japan between July and September 2014. Unlike the first series, this adaptation was produced by A-1 Pictures and is licensed in North America by Aniplex of America.

== Plot ==
The story follows Yu Narukami, a quiet teenager who moves to Inaba to live with his uncle and cousin for a year due to his parents working abroad. After looking into a rumor about a mysterious 'Midnight Channel' that appears on televisions during rainy days, Yu and his new friends, Yosuke Hanamura and Chie Satonaka, discover a strange world hidden inside the television, inhabited by strange monsters known as Shadows and a curious bear-like creature named Teddie. It is here that Yu awakens a mysterious power known as 'Persona', which allows him to fight against the Shadows. Yu and his friends soon discover that this TV World is related to a mysterious string of murders, in which dead bodies appear during foggy days. With the Midnight Channel warning them of potential victims, Yu and his friends, along with Teddie, form an investigation team dedicated to rescuing people who are thrown into the TV before they fall prey to the Shadows and finding the culprit behind the incidents. As the story progresses, the team rescue various people who become their new allies after overcoming their own Shadows and gaining Personas of their own, including Chie's best friend, Yukiko Amagi, delinquent Kanji Tatsumi, idol Rise Kujikawa, and young detective Naoto Shirogane. Together, Yu and his companions face up against the threat of the Shadows whilst also making the best of their youthful school life.

Persona 4: The Golden Animation expands on the series with additional scenarios adapted from the Golden version of the game, in which Yu encounters Marie, a girl from the mysterious Velvet Room who is seeking to regain her memory.

== Production and release ==
Promotional artwork for 2014's Persona 4: The Golden Animation with Yu Narukami and the new character Marie.

In the initial Persona 4 game, the main character is known simply as the Protagonist. However, the anime adaptation gives him the name Yu Narukami. During an interview, game director Katsura Hashino drew attention to the way in which the Protagonist remains silent and emotionless throughout the game. This leaves the player to discern what emotions the character should have shown at any particular point. Hashino elaborated on this particular character trait creating an obstacle for Persona 4: The Animation's director Seiji Kishi since the character would undoubtedly have to speak and show some level of emotion. In the same interview, Kishi admitted the difficulty of the silent Protagonist's transition into the anime without destroying what Hashino had already established.

The anime television adaptation of the game, produced by AIC ASTA and directed by Seiji Kishi, aired for 25 episodes on MBS between October 6, 2011, to March 29, 2012. The series features most of the returning cast from the video game, whilst voice recordings for Igor were taken from the game as his actor, Isamu Tanonaka, died in January 2010. Aniplex released the series on DVD and Blu-ray Disc between November 23, 2011, and August 22, 2012, with the first volume containing a director's cut of the first episode and a bonus CD single. An additional 26th episode, featuring the story's true ending, was included in the 10th BD/DVD volume released on August 22, 2012. Sentai Filmworks licensed the series in North America, simulcasting it on Anime Network as it aired and releasing the series on DVD and Blu-ray in two collective volumes on September 18, 2012, and January 15, 2013, respectively. Like the Japanese version, the English dub retains many of the original voice actors from the English version of the game. Kazé and Manga Entertainment released the series in the United Kingdom in three BD/DVD combi boxsets released between December 24, 2012, and July 22, 2013. Due to licensing issues, the North American BD releases omit the Japanese audio track, though it is still present on DVD releases, as well as all UK releases. A film recap of the series, titled Persona 4: The Animation -The Factor of Hope-, was released in Japanese theaters on June 9, 2012, featuring a condensed version of the story and new scenes of animation. Sentai re-released the series on September 29, 2015, in a Blu-ray/DVD Combo Collector's Edition boxset. The Blu-rays include both Japanese and English audio tracks.

On May 1, 2014, Atlus announced that a second anime television adaptation titled Persona 4: The Golden Animation, is being produced by A-1 Pictures. The series aired on MBS' Animeism programming block between July 10, 2014, and September 25, 2014. Based on the PlayStation Vita port of the game, Persona 4 Golden, the series focuses on new scenarios not featured in the previous series, largely revolving around Yu's encounter with the game's new character, Marie. The series is directed by Tomohisa Taguchi with Kishi serving as chief director, and features the returning cast from the previous games and anime. The fourth BD/DVD volume, released on December 10, 2014, includes an OVA episode depicting an alternate ending. Aniplex of America has licensed the series in North America, simulcasting the series on Crunchyroll, Hulu, and Daisuki, as well as their own Aniplex Channel, as it aired. The series was released on two subtitled Blu-ray Disc volumes on July 21, 2015, and September 29, 2015, respectively.

== Music ==
The series' songs and music were composed by Shoji Meguro, who had previously worked on the original game. Additionally, Tetsuya Kobayashi primarily wrote the soundtrack for The Golden Animation.

The first series, Persona 4: The Animation, used several pieces of theme music; Five opening themes and five ending themes. The two main opening themes are "sky's the limit" by Shihoko Hirata, used for the first twelve episodes, and "key plus words" by Hirata and Yumi Kawamura, used for episodes thirteen onwards. The original broadcast version of the first episode uses "Pursuing My True Self" by Hirata, originally recorded as the opening theme for the video game. The opening themes for episodes 9 and 15 respectively are "True Story" by Rise Kujikawa (Rie Kugimiya) and "Burn My Dread", the opening theme of Persona 3, by Kawamura. The two main ending themes are "Beauty of Destiny" by Hirata featuring Lotus Juice, used for the first twelve episodes, and "The Way of Memories -Kizuna no Chikara-" (The Way of Memories -キズナノチカラ-; "The Way of Memories -The Power of Bonds-") by Hirata, used between episodes 14 and 23. The ending themes for episodes 14 and 18 respectively are "Koisuru Meitantei" (恋する名探偵; "The Love Detective") by Loveline (Yui Horie) and "Honto no Kimochi" (ほんとのきもち; "True Feelings") by Hirata. The ending theme for episode 25, the "True End" OVA, and the film is "Never More", the ending theme of Persona 4, by Hirata.

For Persona 4: The Golden Animation, the main opening and ending themes respectively are "Next Chance to Move On" and "Dazzling Smile", both performed by Hirata. The opening theme for the first episode is "Shadow World" by Hirata, originally recorded for the video game. In episode 11, Marie (Kana Hanazawa) performs the song "Dazzling Smile" for the ending theme. Returning themes include "key plus words", used as the opening theme for episode 8, and "Never More", used as the ending theme of episode 12.

=== Soundtrack CDs ===
All music is composed by Shoji Meguro.

Volume 1 bonus CD: First opening & ending theme songs "sky's the limit/Beauty of Destiny"
No.	Title	Lyrics	Vocalist	Length
1.	"sky's the limit"	Lotus Juice	Shihoko Hirata	4:11
2.	"Beauty of Destiny"	Lotus Juice	Shihoko Hirata feat. Lotus Juice	3:55
3.	"sky's the limit -instrumental ver.-"			4:11
4.	"Beauty of Destiny -instrumental ver.-"			3:55
5.	"sky's the limit -TV size ver.-"	Lotus Juice	Shihoko Hirata	1:30
6.	"Beauty of Destiny -TV size ver.-"	Lotus Juice	Shihoko Hirata feat. Lotus Juice	1:29
Total length:				19:11

Volume 2 bonus CD: Original soundtrack volume 1
No.	Title	Lyrics	Vocalist	Length
1.	"P4A Main theme"			1:40
2.	"Peaceful Message"			1:36
3.	"The strange world"			2:00
4.	"out of mere play"			1:06
5.	"Cheerful"			1:24
6.	"Alone in this World -piano ver.-"			2:14
7.	"Falling into Right Places"	Lotus Juice	Shihoko Hirata	1:38
8.	"Sono Na o Kizame" (その名を刻め, "This Name is Carved")			1:58
9.	"Recollections"			2:07
10.	"Gyakunan Daisakusen!" (逆ナン大作戦!, "Ladies Picking Up Men Tactics!")			1:30
11.	"Truth or Lies"			1:33
12.	"Lost Control"			1:49
13.	"Alone in this World"	Lotus Juice	Shihoko Hirata	2:15
14.	"Determination"			1:44
Total length:				24:34

Volume 3 bonus CD: Drama CD volume 1 "A Day of the May Fool"
No.	Title	Length
1.	"Velvet room"	1:31
2.	"Peaceful Days"	7:27
3.	"The Prince of JUNES?"	5:43
4.	"Let's Do Some intensive Training"	6:15
5.	"Troubled Hero"	7:02
6.	"Strategy Meeting"	7:39
7.	"A Premonition"	2:44
8.	"We're involved with this too!"	6:38
9.	"May Fool"	5:05
Total length:		49:56

Volumes 1-3 bonus CD: Special soundtrack
No.	Title	Lyrics	Vocalist	Length
1.	"P4A Menu"			0:54
2.	"sky's the limit -special mix-"	Lotus Juice	Shihoko Hirata	4:21
3.	"Falling into Right Places -inst ver.-"		Shihoko Hirata	1:39
4.	"Ain't Nobody Can Hold Me Down -inst ver.-"		Shihoko Hirata	1:01
5.	"Time for True Revelation -inst ver.-"		Yumi Kawamura	2:14
6.	"Alone in this World -inst ver.-"		Shihoko Hirata	2:16
7.	"Beauty of Destiny -special mix-"	Lotus Juice	Shihoko Hirata feat. Lotus Juice	4:17
Total length:				16:39

Volume 4 bonus CD: Episode 9 opening theme "True Story"
No.	Title	Lyrics	Vocalist	Length
1.	"True Story"	Yuichiro Tanaka	Rise Kujikawa (Rie Kugimiya)	3:15
2.	"True Story -instrumental ver.-"			3:15
3.	"True Story -TV size ver.-"	Yuichiro Tanaka	Rise Kujikawa (Rie Kugimiya)	1:32
4.	"Your Future"			1:45
5.	"I wish"			2:04
Total length:				11:51

Volume 5 bonus CD: Original soundtrack volume 2
No.	Title	Lyrics	Vocalist	Length
1.	"Ain't Nobody Can Hold Me Down"	Lotus Juice	Shihoko Hirata	1:00
2.	"Freedom overflows"			1:25
3.	"A hero appears behind time"			1:33
4.	"Honey's valley"			1:13
5.	"Guy!"			0:34
6.	"A・I・K・A"			1:16
7.	"Tsuioku no Kakera" (追憶の欠片, "Fragment of Reminiscence")			1:20
8.	"Birth"			1:38
9.	"tears of eternity"			1:57
10.	"Truth is hidden into fog"			1:34
11.	"Crazy Shadow"			1:45
12.	"Time for True Revelation"	Lotus Juice	Yumi Kawamura	2:12
13.	"FALLING DOWN"			3:03
Total length:				20:30

Volume 6 bonus CD: Second opening & ending theme songs "key plus words/The Way of Memories -キズナノチカラ-"
No.	Title	Lyrics	Vocalist	Length
1.	"key plus words"	Lotus Juice	Shihoko Hirata feat. Yumi Kawamura	4:24
2.	"The Way of Memories -Kizuna no Chikara-" (The Way of Memories -キズナノチカラ-, "The Way of Memories -The Power of Bonds-")	Shigeo Komori	Shihoko Hirata	5:01
3.	"key plus words -instrumental ver.-"			4:24
4.	"The Way of Memories -Kizuna no Chikara- -instrumental ver.-"			5:01
5.	"key plus words -TV size ver.-"	Lotus Juice	Shihoko Hirata feat. Yumi Kawamura	1:32
6.	"The Way of Memories -Kizuna no Chikara- -TV size ver.-"	Shigeo Komori	Shihoko Hirata	1:33
Total length:				21:55

Volume 7 bonus CD: Episode 13 & 18 ending theme songs "恋する名探偵/ほんとのきもち"
No.	Title	Lyrics	Vocalist	Length
1.	"Koisuru Meitantei" (恋する名探偵, "The Love Detective")	meg rock	Loveline (Yui Horie)	1:33
2.	"Honto no Kimochi" (ほんとのきもち, "True Feelings")	Shigeo Komori	Shihoko Hirata	4:50
3.	"Koisuru Meitantei -inst. ver.-"			1:33
4.	"Honto no Kimochi -inst. ver.-"			4:50
5.	"Memory"			2:08
6.	"finale"			2:06
Total length:				17:00

Volume 8 bonus CD: Drama CD volume 2 "Perfect Delivery"
No.	Title	Length
1.	"Velvet room"	4:39
2.	"Packing Lunch"	6:27
3.	"Picnic at the SAMEGAWA river"	6:30
4.	"AIYA's Helper"	3:31
5.	"Delivery girl"	7:26
6.	"Down with JUNES!!"	4:21
7.	"Her Identity"	4:50
8.	"Was it lost?"	2:23
9.	"Pinch hitter"	4:17
10.	"INABA Runners"	8:23
11.	"Perfect delivery"	1:34

Volume 9 bonus CD: Original soundtrack volume 3
No.	Title	Lyrics	Vocalist	Length
1.	"P4A Fanfare"			1:18
2.	"Healing"			1:34
3.	"Romeo and Juliet and Hamlet"			1:13
4.	"car chase"			1:56
5.	"Eternal"			1:39
6.	"unmask a person"			1:49
7.	"Empty words"			2:19
8.	"confused smog"			1:39
9.	"We Are One and All"	Lotus Juice	Shihoko Hirata	3:51
10.	"Subete no Hito no Tamashi no Kizuna" (全ての人の魂の絆, "The Bond of Everyone's Souls")			5:13

Persona Music Live 2012 -Mayonaka TV in Tokyo International Forum- bonus CD
No.	Title	Lyrics	Vocalist	Length
1.	"PLIVE2012 Reach Out To The Truth"	Reiko Tanaka	Shihoko Hirata	5:01
2.	"PLIVE2012 key plus words"	Lotus Juice	Shihoko Hirata feat. Yumi Kawamura	4:27
3.	"PLIVE2012 Beauty of Destiny"	Lotus Juice	Shihoko Hirata feat. Lotus Juice	4:18
4.	"PLIVE2012 We Are One and All"	Lotus Juice	Shihoko Hirata	3:50
5.	"PLIVE2012 The Way of Memories -Kizuna no Chikara-"	Shigeo Komori	Shihoko Hirata	5:03

== Reception ==
The anime series has generally received positive critical response by publications for anime, manga and other media. Blu-ray's Jeffrey Kauffman was initially skeptical about the plot until the revelation of the supernatural and wondered how appealing would be the case's outcome. A reviewer from T.H.E.M. Anime Reviews noted that while the pacing and the animation often had issues "Persona 4: The Animation is about as good an adaptation of the video game as you could hope for". Consistent praise was given to the characterization of the silent protagonist from the video game which involved being a deadpan snarker as well as his development across the series that made him a more fleshed character.

Critical reaction to the second anime series has been mixed with critics finding it would appeal only to fans of the original series. They have also agreed Marie lacks the appeal of the other major recurring characters who are more popular within the fandom.
