= Persona 4: Dancing All Night =

2015 video game

- Developer: P-Studio
- Publishers: JP/NA: Atlus; PAL: NIS America; WW: Sega (PS4)
- Directors: Kazuhisa Wada; Nobuyoshi Miwa (PS4)
- Producers: Katsura Hashino; Kazuhisa Wada
- Programmer: Nobuyoshi Miwa
- Artist: Shigenori Soejima
- Writers: Teppei Kobayashi; Renji Ooki; Shinji Yamamoto; Akira Akemine
- Composer: Ryota Kozuka
- Series: Persona
- Platforms: PlayStation Vita; PlayStation 4
- Release: PlayStation Vita: JP: June 25, 2015; NA: September 29, 2015; PAL: November 6, 2015; PlayStation 4: JP: May 24, 2018; WW: December 4, 2018
- Genre: Rhythm
- Mode: Single-player

Persona 4: Dancing All Night (Note: Perusona Fō: Danshingu Ōru Naito (Japanese: ペルソナ４ ダンシングオールナイト)) is a 2015 rhythm video game developed by P-Studio and published by Atlus for the PlayStation Vita. The game is a spin-off of Persona 4 (2008), which is part of the Persona anthology of Megami Tensei games. The game received generally positive reviews from critics. A port for the PlayStation 4 was included with the Endless Night Collection of Persona 3: Dancing in Moonlight and Persona 5: Dancing in Starlight.

== Gameplay ==
Persona 4: Dancing All Night is a rhythm game in which the characters of Persona 4 dance to music from the Persona series, including original and rearranged songs. The game is split into two main modes; Story, where players experience the game's story which is split up by various music stages, and Free Dance, in which players can pick any song they have unlocked and perform at various difficulties, unlocking more songs by clearing each stage.

The game uses analog sticks and six face buttons: the up, left, and down directional buttons and the triangle, circle, and cross buttons. As each stage plays, notes appear from the center of the screen and move towards targets on the sides of the screen, requiring the player to hit the corresponding button in time with the music. Some notes require the player to hit two buttons at the same time, or hold the button down for the duration of the note. In addition to the notes, Scratch Rings appear which require the player to flick either analog stick to hit. Although missing Scratch Rings will not count as a miss, hitting enough pink Fever Rings will allow the player to enter Fever Mode during certain parts of each song, allowing them to earn more points. The player's success is represented by a Hype Gauge at the top of the screen, with the song failing if it drops too low, or is not at a high enough level by the end of the song. If the player's Hype Gauge is high enough upon entering Fever Mode, Bond Fever will activate and a partner character may join the main character in their dance.

Upon clearing a song, players receive in-game money which they can use to purchase new items, costumes, and accessories. Some items may only be unlocked after clearing certain requirements, such as clearing a certain number of songs or making a certain amount of purchases. Costumes and accessories can be used to customize each character's appearance during their songs in Free Dance mode. Items can be used to alter the gameplay to make it easier or more challenging, which in turn increases or decreases the score and money earned from each level. Additional songs, costumes, and accessories can be purchased as downloadable content.

== Story ==
The story is framed as a tale that Margaret is telling to an unseen visitor in the Velvet Room about her guest, Yu Narukami.

Roughly a month following the epilogue of Persona 4 Golden, Rise Kujikawa, who has since returned to the idol industry, asks Yu Narukami and all her other friends to dance alongside her in the upcoming music festival called Love Meets Bonds Festival. As Yu, along with Naoto Shirogane, join up with Rise at her dance studio and are introduced to fellow idol Kanami Mashita, they learn that Kanami's idol group, Kanamin Kitchen, has mysteriously gone missing. Looking into a rumor concerning a video that shows up on the LMB website at midnight, allegedly showing an image of a deceased idol, Yu, Rise, and Naoto decide to check out the video themselves and are sucked into the Midnight Stage, a world separate from the TV world they are used to. There, they discover a mysterious entity that uses strange ribbons and a song to force Shadows to form a bond with her, effectively brainwashing anyone who comes into contact with the ribbons. Unable to use violence in this world, the group discovers that they can use the power of song and dance to express their feelings to the Shadows, freeing them from the voice's control.

The next day, as the rest of the Investigation Team is assembled at the dance studio, the mysterious voice attempts to pull Kanami into the Midnight Stage but ends up grabbing producer Kyoka Ochimizu instead. Following them, the Investigation Team split up to rescue the captured members of Kanamin Kitchen as the voice attempts to force a fake bond with them. As each member is rescued and taken to a safe dressing room, the team discovers pages from a diary. Coming across Ochimizu as well, the group deduces that the world is somehow tied to Yuko Osada, an idol who committed suicide years ago. At the same time, the Shadows they encounter are people who got dragged into the world after watching the video. Back in the real world, Kanami comes across Ryotaro and Nanako Dojima, who become curious about the whereabouts of Yu and the others. As Ryotaro helps Kanami look into the strange circumstances surrounding the incident, Nanako is recognized for her dancing talent and is chosen to appear alongside Kanami at the LMB Festival. During this time, Kanami experiences painful flashbacks as she ponders over the lyrics of her upcoming song, "Calystegia", which was originally intended for Yuko. To her shock, Kanami eventually discovers that the diary she had been carrying all this time belonged to Yuko, who she had witnessed killing herself when she came to the studio to audition years ago. Devastated and traumatized over the repressed memories, Kanami is overcome by despair and pulled into the Midnight Stage.

Back in the Midnight Stage, Ochimizu, who was Yuko's producer back when she was alive, is swayed by the voice but brought to her senses by Yu and the others. Discovering the song sung by the Shadows to be a reversed recording of Calystegia, the team discovers the voice to be a Shadow version of Kanami, who has pulled the real Kanami and the entire LMB audience into the Midnight Stage. Although the team manages to save Kanami and bring her to her senses, the Shadow Kanami, revealed to be a god of desire named Mikuratana-no-Kami, bonds itself with the rest of the audience. Determined to get their feelings across, Rise combines her strength with Kanami and the Kanamin Kitchen girls to power up her Persona, Himiko, transforming it into a giant stage for Yu and the others to express themselves. Finally understanding their feelings, Mikuratana-no-Kami releases everyone and returns them to the real world, where Kanami prepares to finish off the festival with a performance of Calystegia.

In the aftermath, it is revealed that the actual events behind the festival have been covered up, thanks in large part due to the efforts of Ochimizu, and Dojima, despite the police's disapproval. The audience, and the general public, is fooled into thinking the events were caused by a combination of special effects, technical malfunctions, publicity stunts, and staged skits (helped by the lack of clear memories of the LMB audience). Furthermore, the experiences of those who were pulled into the Midnight Stage as shadows were put down to mass-induced hysteria. With things now back to normal, Rise can make her career comeback as an idol.

The epilogue concludes with Margaret telling the unseen visitor that their purpose in visiting the Velvet Room was to learn this tale about the value of bonds so that they can pass it on to other people. As the unseen visitor leaves, she tells them to not worry about Yu and his friends as "their journey will never end".

The events later lead to the stories of Persona 3: Dancing in Moonlight and Persona 5: Dancing in Starlight, as Elizabeth, Caroline, and Justine learn about these events and become jealous.

== Development ==
Persona 4: Dancing All Night was announced alongside Persona 5 and Persona Q: Shadow of the Labyrinth during an Atlus event in Japan on November 24, 2013. The game was being primarily developed by Dingo Inc., noted for their work on the Hatsune Miku: Project DIVA series. Later in 2014, due to quality concerns Atlus's P-Studio team took over main development, with Dingo being retained as a supporting developer. A North American release was later announced for 2015. During Tokyo Game Show 2014, it was announced that the Japanese version would also be released in 2015, when it was previously announced to be released in Fall 2014. On June 28, 2015, it was announced that NIS America would be publishing the game in Europe in Fall 2015. Following this announcement, Bandai Namco announced on their official Twitter account that the game would also be released in Australia and New Zealand on November 5, 2015. Rise Kujikawa is played by Ashly Burch in the game due to conflicting schedules which prevented Laura Bailey, Rise's English voice actress in previous Persona games, from reprising her role.

The soundtrack was supervised and directed by series regular, Shoji Meguro, with original compositions by Ryota Kozuka. The game features over 30 tracks, including remixes of previous songs in the franchise by other musicians such as Tetsuya Komuro, Daisuke Asakura, Shinichi Osawa, Towa Tei, De De Mouse, Narasaki, Banvox, Norihiko Hibino, Yuu Miyake, Akira Yamaoka, and Lotus Juice (Note: Lotus Juice was also the game's system voice.). The game features multiple playable characters, including all eight members of Persona 4's Investigation Team, along with Nanako, Margaret and Kanami Mashita from Persona 4, the lattermost of whom being playable for the first time. Additionally, the Persona 4 character Tohru Adachi and the Persona 4 Golden character Marie are available through downloadable content. An additional DLC track features Vocaloid character Hatsune Miku as a playable character, being only voiced in Japanese.

== Reception ==
Reception

Aggregate scores
Aggregator	Score
Metacritic	VITA: 76/100
OpenCritic	75% recommend

Review scores
Publication	Score
Destructoid	8/10
Famitsu	33/40
GameSpot	5/10
IGN	8.4/10
Polygon	8.5/10

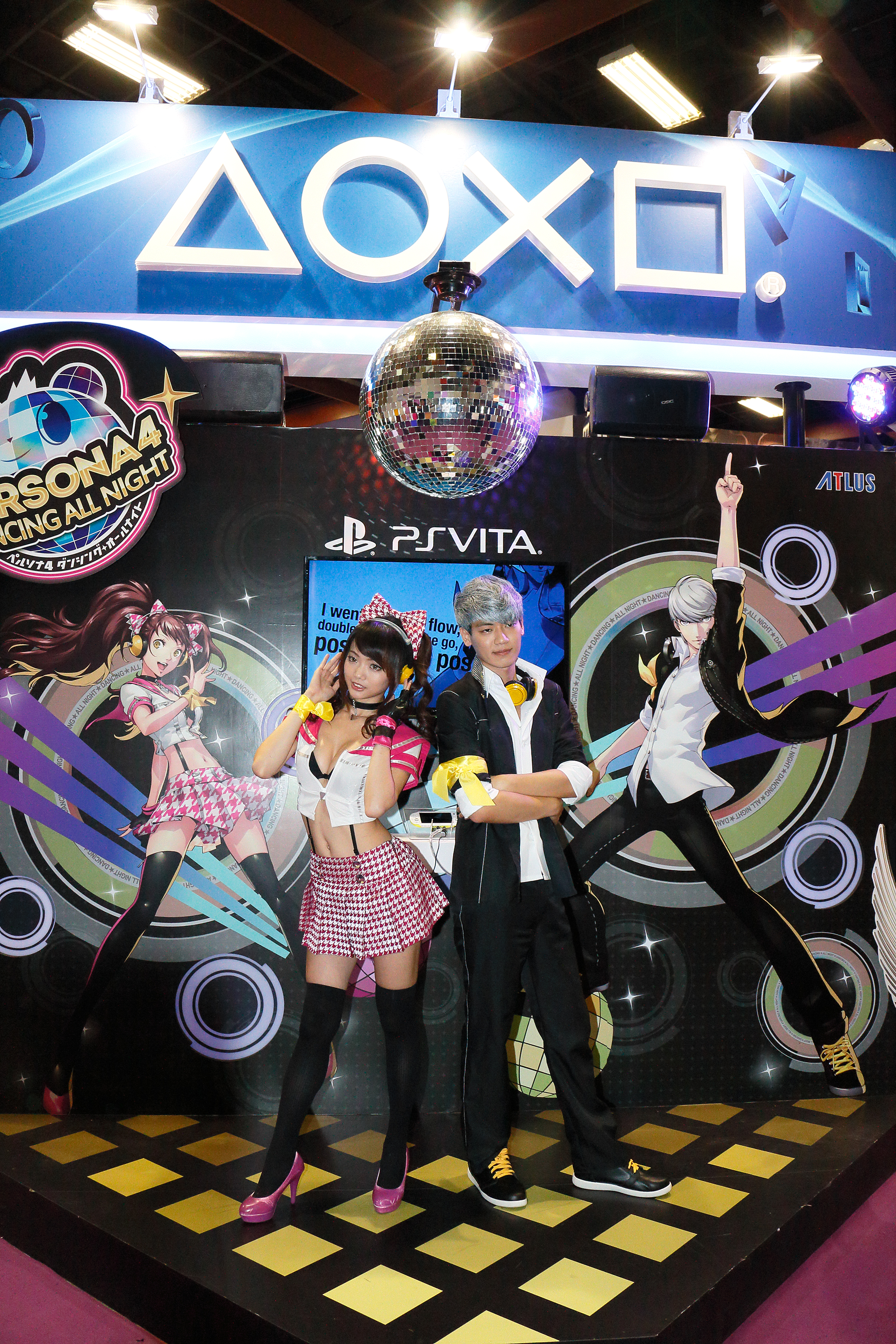
A booth at a comic convention in Taiwan in August 2015 advertising Persona 4: Dancing All Night

The Japanese video game magazine Famitsu gave the game a review score of 33 out of 40, consisting of the sub-scores 8, 8, 8, and 9. Heath Hindman of PlayStation LifeStyle gave the game 8 out of 10, praising the soundtrack and unique feel of the game. The game sold 94,036 physical retail copies within its debut week of release within Japan, placing second within the Japanese software sales charts for that particular week. IGN awarded it 8.4 out of 10, saying "Persona 4: Dancing All Night highlights the wonderful music from the Persona series while building a solid story".

However, Heidi Kemps of GameSpot gave the game a 5 out of 10, and stated that "Dancing All Night might have sounded like a fun idea on paper, but it simply doesn't hold a candle to better portable rhythm games." She also stated that the "story is disappointing, the gameplay is mediocre, and the only thing that feels fun is playing dress-up with characters and their various outfits."

An Internet meme dubbed the "Bancho Dance" is popular on social media platforms, which was born out of Yu Narukami performing a choreographed dance to the song "Specialist" in Dancing All Night. The meme features displaying insults to make it look as if Yu Narukami is saying them.

== Sequels ==
Beginning development simultaneously following the success of Dancing All Night, the team intended to make refinements to both gameplay and graphics. Initially wanting to work on a game based on Persona 3, the development of Persona 5 and fan anticipation encouraged them to make games based on both titles. Because of this, they decided to release the games simultaneously. A major difference is the lack of a story mode, with rhythm sequences instead taking place within the events of Persona 3 and Persona 5 around character-based interactions. The games, titled Persona 3: Dancing in Moonlight and Persona 5: Dancing in Starlight, were released for the PlayStation 4 and PlayStation Vita in 2018.
