= Yuri Lowenthal filmography =

Performances by American voice actor

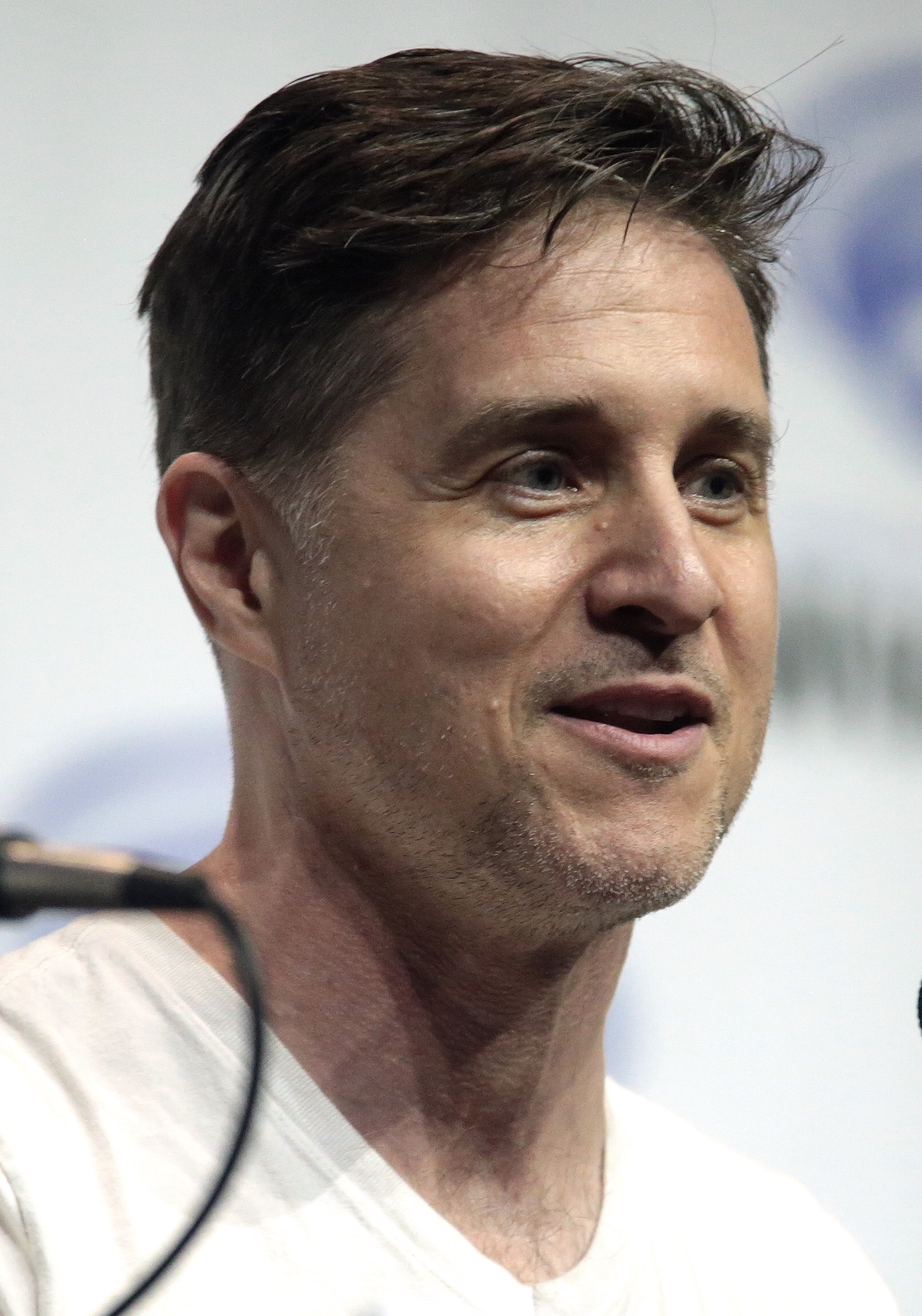
Lowenthal at the 2018 WonderCon

This is the filmography of American voice actor, producer and screenwriter Yuri Lowenthal.

== Voice-over filmography ==
=== Anime ===
List of dubbing performances in anime
| Year | Title | Role | Notes | Source |
|---|---|---|---|---|
| 2003 | SD Gundam Force | Bakunetsumaru | | |
| 2004 | Marmalade Boy | Ginta Suou | As Sean Roberts | |
| 2004–2005 | Rave Master | Haru Glory | | |
| 2005 | Hanaukyo Maid Team | Toro Hanakyo | | |
| 2005 | Kyo Kara Maoh! | Yuri Shibuya | As Jimmy Benedict | |
| 2005 | Scrapped Princess | Leopold Scorpus | | |
| 2005 | Girls Bravo | Yukinari Sasaki | | |
| 2005 | DearS | Khi | | |
| 2005–2006 | Saiyuki Reload | Son Goku | As Jimmy Benedict Also Gunlock, grouped under English Voice Cast | |
| 2005–2008 | Naruto | Sasuke Uchiha | | - |
| 2006 | Haré+Guu | Wadi | | |
| 2006 | Boys Be... | Takuya Yokota | Ep. 10 | |
| 2006 | Kamichu! | Yashima | | |
| 2006–2014 | Bleach | Keigo Asano, Renji Abarai (Young), Byakuya Kuchiki (Young), Shinobu Eishima, Kaoru Unagiya | | |
| 2007 | Afro Samurai | Kuma | | |
| 2007 | Eyeshield 21 | Sena Kobayakawa | | |
| 2007–2012 | Hellsing Ultimate | Pip Bernadotte, Enrico Maxwell (young) | Hellsing Ultimate III and Hellsing Ultimate VI | |
| 2008 | Gurren Lagann | Simon | | |
| 2008–2009 | Code Geass: Lelouch of the Rebellion | Suzaku Kururugi | | |
| 2008–2010 | Blue Dragon | Shu | | |
| 2009–2019 | Naruto: Shippuden | Sasuke Uchiha, Kamano, Gasuka | | Press |
| 2010–2014 | Mobile Suit Gundam Unicorn | Riddhe Marcenas | | |
| 2011–2016 | Durarara!! | Shinra Kishitani | | |
| 2012 | Persona 4 The Animation | Yosuke Hanamura | | |
| 2012–2022 | Tiger & Bunny | Barnaby Brooks Jr. | | |
| 2013–2014 | Tenkai Knights | Gen Kurai | | |
| 2017 | Code Geass: Akito the Exiled | Suzaku Kururugi | | |
| 2018 | FLCL Progressive | Marco Nogata | | |
| 2019–2024 | Boruto: Naruto Next Generations | Sasuke Uchiha | | |
| 2020 | Marvel Future Avengers | Bucky Barnes / Winter Soldier, Crimson Dynamo | | |
| 2021 | Record of Ragnarok | Alcides | | |
| 2022 | Gal & Dino | Shouta, Shouta Aoi | | |
| 2022 | Kotaro Lives Alone | Male Supervising Lawyer, Male Real Estate Agent | | |
| 2023–present | Bleach: Thousand-Year Blood War | Keigo Asano | 2 episodes | |
| 2023 | Onimusha | Sahei | | |
| 2024 | Ishura | Dakai, Additional Voices | 7 episodes | |
| 2024 | Code Geass: Rozé of the Recapture | Suzaku Kururugi | | |
| 2026 | Jujutsu Kaisen | Kinji Hakari | | |

=== Animation ===
List of voice performances in animation
| Year | Title | Role | Notes | Source |
|---|---|---|---|---|
| 2004 | Rocket Power | Announcer | Episode: "The Big Day: Part 1" | |
| 2005–2006 | A.T.O.M. | Silas Greene | | |
| 2006–2008 | Legion of Super Heroes | Superman, Superman-X / Kell-El, Stone Boy, Senator Tolay | | |
| 2006 | El Chavo Animado | Junior | English version | |
| 2007 | Spectrobes | Rallen | Web series | |
| 2008–2010 | Ben 10: Alien Force | Ben Tennyson, Albedo, Alien X | | |
| 2008–2011 | Batman: The Brave and the Bold | Mister Miracle, Tuftan, Golden Age Hero | 2 episodes | |
| 2009 | Wolverine and the X-Men | Bobby Drake / Iceman | | |
| 2009–2012 | Huntik: Secrets & Seekers | Lok Lambert | Season 1 | |
| 2010–2012 | Ben 10: Ultimate Alien | Ben Tennyson, Albedo, Alien X, Eon, additional voices | | |
| 2010–2013 | Generator Rex | Moss, Ben Tennyson, Upgrade | | |
| 2010–present | Monster High | Clawd Wolf, Deuce Gorgon, Heath Burns, Gil | | |
| 2010–2022 | Young Justice | Garth, Icicle, Tommy Terror, Lagoon Boy, Zviad Baazovi, Plasmus, Lizard Johnny, Trogowogs, Beta Leader | | |
| 2011 | ThunderCats | Emrick | Episode: "Song of the Petalars" | |
| 2011–2013 | Regular Show | Adam, Mikey, Guy in Hoodie, Guy in Cornfield, Kid in Pumpkin Patch | 2 episodes | |
| 2012 | Winx Club | Ogron | Nickelodeon English dub | Tweet |
| 2012–2014 | Ben 10: Omniverse | Ben Tennyson, Feedback, XLR8, AmpFibian, Kickin' Hawk, Upgrade, Alien X, Albedo, Bad Ben, Benzarro, Mad Ben, Nega Ben, Lt. Steel, Speedyquick | Also writer: "The Most Dangerous Game Show" | |
| 2012–2015 | Wild Grinders | Goggles, Jack Knife, Spitball, Lackey | Credited as Jimmy Benedict | |
| 2013 | Avengers Assemble | Egghead | Episode: "Ant-Man Makes It Big" | |
| 2013 | Riding Shotgun | Doyle | | |
| 2014 | Beware the Batman | Creed Courtman, Detective Thomas | | |
| 2014 | Lost Treasure Hunt | Dex | Episode: "Columbus Pilot" | |
| 2014 | Turbo Fast | Director, Toy Store Guy | Episode: "Turbo Drift" | |
| 2014–2015 | TOME: Terrain of Magical Expertise | Rubirules | 4 episodes | |
| 2014–2016 | TripTank | Various voices | | |
| 2014–2018 | Space Racers | Eagle | | |
| 2015 | Pig Goat Banana Cricket | Prince Mermeow, JR Sneezy, Awesome Shoes, Pickle (1), Fox | | |
| 2015 | DC Super Friends | Flash | | |
| 2015 | Teenage Mutant Ninja Turtles | Ninjas | Episode: "Tales of the Yokai" | |
| 2015 | X-Ray and Vav | Little Boy | Episode: "Divide & Conquer" | |
| 2015 | Be Cool, Scooby-Doo! | Andy, Officer Hiroshi, Old Man | 2 episodes | |
| 2015–present | RWBY | Mercury Black | Starting with Volume 3 | |
| 2016 | Teenage Mutant Ninja Turtles: Pizza Friday | Leonardo | Short film | |
| 2016 | The Mr. Peabody & Sherman Show | Baby Kenny | Episode: "The Wrath of Hughes" | |
| 2016 | Transformers: Robots in Disguise | Glacius | Episode: "Cover Me" | |
| 2016–2018 | RWBY Chibi | Mercury Black | | |
| 2016–2021 | Ben 10 | Michael Morningstar, Vilgax, additional voices | | |
| 2016–2024 | Camp Camp | Neil | | |
| 2017 | Star Wars Rebels | Jon "Dutch" Vander | Episode: "Secret Cargo" | |
| 2017–2020 | Spider-Man | Clayton Cole / Clash, Curt Connors / Lizard, Nocturnal | | |
| 2017–2020 | We Bare Bears | Bird'dex, Joshy, additional voices | 2 episodes | |
| 2018 | Bunnicula | Zakarov | Episode: "Bunn in Space" | |
| 2018 | Spy Kids: Mission Critical | Desmond "Dez" and Zedmond "Zed" Vasquez/Rock n' Roll, Talon, Jason Pietranthony/Improvisario | Recurring role | |
| 2018 | Little Big Awesome | Mord, Gord | 2 episodes | |
| 2018–2019 | DuckTales | Butler, DT-87, Jr. Woodchuck #1, Nightmare Beast | 4 episodes | |
| 2019 | Love, Death & Robots | Young Man | Episode: "Fish Night" | |
| 2019 | Victor and Valentino | Baker | Episode: "The Dark Room" | |
| 2019 | Where's Waldo? | Zhang Wei, Jacques, Official, Fergus, Yep, Constable, Hiker #2, Hiker #5, Prince #3 | 9 episodes | |
| 2019 | DC Super Hero Girls | Steve Trevor | 3 episodes | |
| 2019 | Shimmer and Shine | Duncan McBride, Herby, Jonathan, Eddy Smartley, Chris Lizowski | 23 episodes | |
| 2021 | Arcane | Mylo, Stall Holder, Thug #1 | Netflix series | |
| 2021 | The Ghost and Molly McGee | Uncle Ted | Episode: "Mazel Tov, Libby!" | |
| 2021–2022 | Dota: Dragon's Blood | Davion | Netflix series | |
| 2021–2022 | He-Man and the Masters of the Universe | He-Man, additional voices | Netflix series | |
| 2024 | Batman: Caped Crusader | Darryl Manning, Detective Eric Coleman, Stand-In | | |
| 2025 | The Mighty Nein | Teen Bully | | |

=== Direct-to-video and television films ===
List of voice and dubbing performances in direct-to-video and television films
| Year | Title | Role | Notes | Source |
|---|---|---|---|---|
| 2005 | Digimon Tamers: Battle of Adventurers | Kai Urazoe | | |
| 2006 | Teen Titans: Trouble in Tokyo | Scarface, Japanese biker | | |
| 2007 | Naruto the Movie: Ninja Clash in the Land of Snow | Sasuke Uchiha | | |
| 2009 | Afro Samurai: Resurrection | Kuma | | |
| 2011 | Naruto Shippuden the Movie: Bonds | Sasuke Uchiha | | |
| 2011 | A Turtle's Tale: Sammy's Adventures | Sammy | | |
| 2012 | Back to the Sea | Kevin | | |
| 2012 | Batman: The Dark Knight Returns | Son of Batman | | |
| 2012 | The Swan Princess Christmas | Derek | Writer | |
| 2013 | Time of Eve | Rikuo Sakisaka | | |
| 2014 | Bayonetta: Bloody Fate | Luka Redgrave | | |
| 2014 | The Swan Princess: A Royal Family Tale | Derek | Writer | |
| 2014 | Axel: The Biggest Little Hero | Axel | | |
| 2015 | Tiger & Bunny: The Rising | Barnaby Brooks Jr. | | |
| 2015 | Batman Unlimited: Animal Instincts | Red Robin | | |
| 2015 | Dino Time | Max Santiago | | |
| 2015 | Justice League: Gods and Monsters | Jor-El, Jimmy Olsen | | |
| 2015 | Batman Unlimited: Monster Mayhem | Red Robin | | |
| 2015 | The Last: Naruto the Movie | Sasuke Uchiha | | |
| 2016 | Lego DC Comics Super Heroes: Justice League: Cosmic Clash | Cosmic Boy | | |
| 2016 | The Swan Princess: Princess Tomorrow, Pirate Today | Derek | | |
| 2017 | The Swan Princess: Royally Undercover | Derek | | |
| 2018 | Batman: Gotham by Gaslight | Harvey Dent | | |
| 2018 | Batman Ninja | Robin, Red Hood | | |
| 2021 | Injustice | Mirror Master, Flash, Shazam | | |
| 2022 | Mortal Kombat Legends: Snow Blind | Kobra | | |
| 2023 | Legion of Super-Heroes | Mon-El | | |
| 2024 | Watchmen | Wally Weaver, Seymour David, additional voices | | |

=== Feature films ===
List of voice and dubbing performances in feature films
| Year | Title | Role | Notes | Source |
|---|---|---|---|---|
| 2008 | The Pirates Who Don't Do Anything: A VeggieTales Movie | Prince Alexander | | |
| 2011 | Films of Fury: The Kung Fu Movie Movie | Narrator | Documentary | |
| 2015 | Birdboy: The Forgotten Children | Zacharias | Limited theatrical release | |
| 2015 | The Laws of the Universe Part 0 | Tyler | Limited theatrical release | |
| 2016 | Robinson Crusoe a.k.a. The Wild Life | Robinson Crusoe | | |
| 2017 | The Son of Bigfoot | Tony, one of Adam's bullies, Japanese Man #2 | | |
| 2018 | Big Fish & Begonia | Goumang, Tingmu | Limited theatrical release | |
| 2018 | Incredibles 2 | Additional Voices | | |
| 2019 | Promare | Meis | English dub, limited theatrical release | |
| 2020 | Dragon Quest: Your Story | Luca Gotha (The Hero) | English dub | |
| 2023 | Spider-Man: Across the Spider-Verse | Insomniac Spider-Man (Earth-1048) | Cameo appearance | |
| 2024 | Gurren Lagann the Movie: Childhood's End | Simon | English dub | |
| 2024 | Gurren Lagann the Movie: The Lights in the Sky are Stars | Simon | English dub | |
| 2026 | That Time I Got Reincarnated as a Slime the Movie: Tears of the Azure Sea | Djeese | English dub | |

=== Video games ===
List of voice and dubbing performances in video games
| Year | Title | Role | Notes | Source |
|---|---|---|---|---|
| 2003 | Medal of Honor: Rising Sun | Ichiro "Harry" Tanaka | | Resume |
| 2003 | Prince of Persia: The Sands of Time | The Prince | | |
| 2005 | Rave Master | Haru Glory | | |
| 2005 | Radiata Stories | Daniel | | |
| 2005 | Prince of Persia: The Two Thrones | The Prince | | |
| 2006 | Ace Combat Zero: The Belkan War | Larry "Pixy" Foulke | English version | |
| 2006 | Steambot Chronicles | Dandelion | | |
| 2006 | Dirge of Cerberus: Final Fantasy VII | Incidental characters | | |
| 2006 | Xenosaga Episode III: Also sprach Zarathustra | Kevin Winnicot | | |
| 2006 | Bratz: Forever Diamondz | Bryce, Male shopkeeper | | |
| 2006 | Tales of the Abyss | Luke fon Fabre, Asch | | |
| 2006 | Final Fantasy XII | Reks | | |
| 2006 | Baten Kaitos Origins | Giacomo | | |
| 2006–present | Naruto video games | Sasuke Uchiha | English version | |
| 2006–2007, 2017 | .hack//G.U. games | Haseo | Rebirth, Reminisce, Redemption, Last Recode | |
| 2007 | Rogue Galaxy | Steve | | |
| 2007 | Persona 3 | Protagonist, Ryoji Mochizuki | | |
| 2007 | Jeanne d'Arc | Roger | | |
| 2007 | Uncharted: Drake's Fortune | Mercenaries | | |
| 2007 | Castlevania: Symphony of the Night | Alucard | Unlockable game in The Dracula X Chronicles | |
| 2007 | Power Rangers: Super Legends | Red Power Ranger, Omega S.P.D. Ranger, Future Omega Ranger | | |
| 2008 | Final Fantasy IV | Cecil Harvey | Nintendo DS version | |
| 2008 | Tom Clancy's EndWar | English Voice Talent | | |
| 2008 | Guilty Gear 2: Overture | Sin, That Man | | Tweet |
| 2008 | Saints Row 2 | Shogo Akuji | | |
| 2008 | Star Ocean: First Departure | Roddick Farrence | | |
| 2008 | Persona 4 | Yosuke Hanamura | | |
| 2008–2013 | Ben 10 games | Ben Tennyson | Starting with Alien Force | |
| 2009 | The Lord of the Rings: Conquest | Frodo, Elven Officer, Rohan Officer | | |
| 2009 | Afro Samurai | Jinnosuke/Kuma | | |
| 2009 | Watchmen: The End Is Nigh | Voice-over Actors | | |
| 2009 | MagnaCarta 2 | Crocell | | |
| 2009 | Dissidia Final Fantasy | Cecil Harvey | | |
| 2009 | Uncharted 2: Among Thieves | Serbian Soldiers | | |
| 2009 | Assassin's Creed II | Vieri De Pazzi | | |
| 2009 | Dragon Age: Origins | Sandal & Additional voices | | |
| 2009 | Cartoon Network Universe: FusionFall | Ben Tennyson, Albedo, Alien X | | |
| 2010 | Bayonetta | Luka, Temperantia | | |
| 2010 | Final Fantasy XIII | Cocoon Inhabitants | | |
| 2010 | No More Heroes 2: Desperate Struggle | Charlie MacDonald, Jasper Batt Jr. | | |
| 2010 | BioShock 2 | Crawler | | |
| 2010 | Prince of Persia: The Forgotten Sands | The Prince | | |
| 2010 | Metal Gear Solid: Peace Walker | Soldiers, Extras | English version | |
| 2010 | Professor Layton and the Unwound Future | Future Luke/Clive Dove | | |
| 2010 | Fallout: New Vegas | Various characters | Credited under Additional voices | |
| 2010 | Metro 2033 | English Voice Talent | Also Metro Redux version | |
| 2011 | Gods Eater Burst | Soma Schicksal | Grouped in English Voice Cast | |
| 2011 | Dissidia 012 Final Fantasy | Cecil Harvey | | |
| 2011 | Shadows of the Damned | Elliot, Demons | | |
| 2011 | Catherine | Tobias Nebbins | Nominated – National Academy of Video Game Trade Reviewers (NAVGTR) Award for Supporting Performance in a Drama, 2011 | |
| 2011 | Resistance 3 | Tommy Dean, Mathison, Tony | | |
| 2011 | X-Men: Destiny | Nightcrawler | | |
| 2011 | The Lord of the Rings: War in the North | | | |
| 2011 | Uncharted 3: Drake's Deception | Serbian Soldiers | | |
| 2011 | Saints Row: The Third | Matt Miller, Radio Voices | | |
| 2011 | Star Wars: The Old Republic | Various characters | | |
| 2011 | Gears of War 3 | Balcony Man | | |
| 2011 | Cartoon Network: Punch Time Explosion | Ben Tennyson, Captain Planet, Flapjack (3DS version), Numbuh One (3DS version) | Grouped under "Featuring the Voice Talents Of" | |
| 2011–present | Dead or Alive series | Hayate/Ein | Starting with Dimensions | |
| 2012 | Soulcalibur V | Patroklos Alexander | | |
| 2012 | Unchained Blades | | | |
| 2012 | Infex | | Interactive graphic novel | |
| 2012 | Persona 4: Arena | Yosuke Hanamura | | |
| 2012 | Persona 4 Golden | Yosuke Hanamura | | |
| 2012 | Guild Wars 2 | Lord Faren, Hero-Tron | | |
| 2012 | Resident Evil 6 | Finn Macauley | | |
| 2012 | Karateka | True Love | | |
| 2012–2015 | Skylanders series | Fright Rider, Softpaw, Trail Blazer | Starting with Giants, reprises (Note: Skylanders characters reprise in later titles.) | |
| 2013 | Anarchy Reigns | Zero, Edgar Oinkie | | |
| 2013 | Fire Emblem Awakening | Ricken | | |
| 2013 | Sly Cooper: Thieves in Time | Sir Galleth Cooper | Nominated – NAVGTR Award for Supporting Performance in a Comedy, 2013 | |
| 2013 | Metro: Last Light | English Voice Talent | Also Metro Redux version | |
| 2013 | The Last of Us | Various characters | Grouped under Voice Over Cast | |
| 2013 | The Bureau: XCOM Declassified | Nils | | |
| 2013 | Saints Row IV | Matt Miller | | |
| 2013 | Teenage Mutant Ninja Turtles: Out of the Shadows | Donatello | | |
| 2013 | The Wonderful 101 | Wonder-White | | |
| 2013 | Grand Theft Auto V | The Local Population | | |
| 2013 | Rune Factory 4 | Doug | Also Special | |
| 2013 | Young Justice: Legacy | Icicle Jr., Tempest/Garth, Lagoon Boy | | |
| 2013–2015 | Disney Infinity series | Toy Box Narrator | Grouped under Voice Talent | |
| 2014 | The Lego Movie Videogame | Voice Talent | | |
| 2014 | Infamous Second Son | Russian Bully 2, Male Ped 3, Agent Male 1 | | |
| 2014 | Diablo III: Reaper of Souls | Lorath Nahr | | |
| 2014 | WildStar | Various characters | | |
| 2014 | Middle-earth: Shadow of Mordor | Humans | | |
| 2014 | Tenkai Knights: Brave Battle | Gen | | |
| 2014 | The Evil Within | Joseph Oda | | |
| 2014 | Bayonetta 2 | Luka, Temperantia | | |
| 2014 | Spider-Man Unlimited | Peter Parker / Spider-Man | | |
| 2014 | Persona Q: Shadow of the Labyrinth | Yosuke Hanamura, Persona 3 Protagonist | | |
| 2014 | Sunset Overdrive | Male Player Character | | |
| 2014 | Lego Ninjago: Nindroids | Zane | | |
| 2014 | Guilty Gear Xrd | Bedman | | Tweet |
| 2014–2015 | Game of Thrones | Tom, Erik, Finn | | |
| 2015 | Saints Row: Gat Out of Hell | Matt Miller | | |
| 2015 | Resident Evil: Revelations 2 | Neil Fisher | | |
| 2015 | The Order: 1886 | Nikola Tesla | | |
| 2015 | There Came an Echo | | | |
| 2015 | Fallout 4 | Danny Sullivan, Vault-Tec Scientists | | |
| 2015 | Code Name: S.T.E.A.M. | Marth | | |
| 2015 | Mad Max | | | |
| 2015 | Xenoblade Chronicles X | Male Avatar (Heroic voice) | | |
| 2015–2016 | Lego Dimensions | Zane, Percival Graves | Credited under Voiceover Talent | |
| 2016 | Hitman | Supporting Cast | | |
| 2016 | Uncharted 4: A Thief's End | Shoreline Mercenaries | | |
| 2016 | Mighty No. 9 | Beck | | |
| 2016 | Star Ocean: Integrity and Faithlessness | Ceisus | | |
| 2016 | The Technomancer | David Ward / Alan Mancer | | |
| 2016 | Titanfall 2 | Davis | | |
| 2017 | Fire Emblem Heroes | Eliwood, Marth, Merric | Also narrated Fire Emblem Direct video | |
| 2017 | Minecraft: Story Mode – Season Two | Radar, Willy | Credited as "Additional Voices" for role as Willy | |
| 2018 | Dissidia Final Fantasy NT | Cecil Harvey | | |
| 2018 | Marvel's Spider-Man | Peter Parker / Spider-Man | Voice and performance capture Nominated for Best Performance at The Game Awards 2018; Nominated for Outstanding Achievement in Character at the 22nd Annual D.I.C.E. Awards | |
| 2018 | Dragalia Lost | Marth | | |
| 2018 | Lego DC Super-Villains | Superboy | | |
| 2018 | World of Final Fantasy Maxima | Cecil Harvey | | |
| 2018 | Super Smash Bros. Ultimate | Marth, Alucard | | Tweet |
| 2019 | Judgment | Shinpei Okubo | English version | |
| 2019 | Marvel Ultimate Alliance 3: The Black Order | Peter Parker / Spider-Man | | |
| 2019 | Catherine: Full Body | Astaroth, Tobias "Toby" Nebbins | | |
| 2019 | Death Stranding | The Engineer | | |
| 2019 | Need For Speed Heat | | Credited under Voice Talents | |
| 2020 | Final Fantasy VII Remake | Johnny | | |
| 2020 | The Last of Us Part II | Additional voices | | |
| 2020 | Genshin Impact | Dainsleif | | |
| 2020 | Bugsnax | Chandlo Funkbun | | |
| 2020 | Marvel's Spider-Man: Miles Morales | Peter Parker / Spider-Man | | |
| 2020 | Call of the Sea | Harry Everhart | | |
| 2021 | Nier Replicant ver.1.22474487139... | Gideon, Postman | | |
| 2021 | Marvel Future Revolution | Peter Parker / Spider-Man | Also voices alternate versions of the character | |
| 2021 | Lost Judgment | Sadao Takano | | |
| 2021 | Cookie Run: Kingdom | Pure Vanilla Cookie | | |
| 2021 | Psychonauts 2 | Dion Aquato | | |
| 2022 | Rune Factory 5 | Doug | | |
| 2022 | Return to Monkey Island | The Cook, Vendor | | |
| 2022 | Star Ocean: The Divine Force | Additional voices | | |
| 2022 | Call of Duty: Modern Warfare II | Erikson | | |
| 2022 | Marvel's Midnight Suns | Peter Parker / Spider-Man | | |
| 2023 | Fire Emblem Engage | Marth | | |
| 2023 | Cassette Beasts | Aleph | | |
| 2023 | Redfall | Jacob Boyer | | |
| 2023 | Mortal Kombat 1 | Smoke, Adam | | |
| 2023 | Marvel's Spider-Man 2 | Peter Parker / Spider-Man | Nominated for Best Performance at The Game Awards 2023 | |
| 2023 | American Arcadia | Trevor Hills | | |
| 2023 | Teenage Mutant Ninja Turtles: Splintered Fate | Michelangelo | | |
| 2024 | Persona 3 Reload | Eiichiro Takeba | English version | |
| 2024 | Helldivers 2 | Default Helldiver Voice 2 | | |
| 2024 | Final Fantasy VII Rebirth | Johnny | English version | |
| 2024 | Alone in the Dark | Mr. Waits, Jacob Van Ostadte | | |
| 2024 | Marvel Rivals | Peter Parker / Spider-Man | | |
| 2024 | The Elder Scrolls Online | The Fox, Uriel Weatherleah | | |
| 2024 | Call of Duty: Black Ops 6 | Matvey Gusev | | |
| 2025 | The Legend of Heroes: Trails Through Daybreak II | Gardenmaster | English version | |
| 2025 | Xenoblade Chronicles X: Definitive Edition | Male Avatar (Heroic voice), additional voices | English version | |
| 2025 | Rusty Rabbit | Flemy | English version | |
| 2026 | Teenage Mutant Ninja Turtles: Empire City | Michelangelo | | |
| 2026 | Mega Man Star Force Legacy Collection | Zack Temple | English version | |
| 2026 | Call of Duty: Modern Warfare 4 | Additional voices | | |

=== Other voice-over roles ===
List of voice performances in other media
| Year | Title | Role | Notes | Source |
|---|---|---|---|---|
| 2021 | Old Gods of Appalachia | The Railroad Man | | |
| 2023 | Who is NO/ONE? | Noah Kemp | Narrative fiction podcast | |
| 2023 | Hullabaloo | Bar Patron #1 | Episode: "The Great Race" | |
| 2025–2026 | 5 Years Later | Alien X, Branch-Out, Ben Tennyson | Fan-made web series; reprises role from Ben 10: Alien Force, Ben 10: Ultimate Alien, and Ben 10: Omniverse | |
| 2025 | Magic: The Gathering | Spider-Man, Michelangelo | | |

== Live-action filmography ==
=== Television ===
List of acting performances in television and web series
| Year | Title | Role | Notes | Source |
|---|---|---|---|---|
| 1997 | Viva Variety | | | Resume |
| 2005 | Alias | Bishop's Driver | Episode: "The Awful Truth" | Resume |
| 2005–2006 | Gilmore Girls | Carl, Sookie's Sous Chef | 2 episodes | Resume |
| 2006 | Close to Home | EMT | Episode: "The Good Doctor" | Resume |
| 2008 | Adventures in Voice Acting | Himself | Direct-to-video documentary series | |
| 2008 | Absolution: The Series | | Web series | |
| 2009 | Terminator: The Sarah Connor Chronicles | Christopher Garvin | 2 episodes | |
| 2010 | A Good Knight's Quest | Marcus | Web series | |
| 2011 | Criminal Minds | Jake Ellison | Episode: "The Stranger" | Resume |
| 2011 | Silver Case | Donnie | Film festival run | Resume |
| 2011–2013 | Shelf Life | Bug Boy | Creator, producer | |
| 2012 | Warehouse 13: Grand Designs | Nikola Tesla | | Resume |
| 2012, 2015 | Tabletop | Guest | 2 episodes | |
| 2013 | Hawaii Five-0 | Liam | Episode: "Hoa Pili" | |
| 2015 | Titansgrave: The Ashes of Valkana | S'Lethkk | RPG web series, cast member | |

=== Film ===
List of acting performances in film
| Year | Title | Role | Notes | Source |
|---|---|---|---|---|
| 2008 | Con Artists | | Producer | |
| 2010 | Van Von Hunter | Van Von Hunter | Live-action mockumentary | |
| 2011 | The Arcadian | Kraken | Screenplay, live-action, film festival release | |
| 2013 | The Seance Hour: Evil Unleashed | The Victim | | |
| 2014 | Topsy McGee vs. the Sky Pirates | Sean McGee | Producer, Writer, short film | |
| 2015 | The Phoenix Incident | Glenn Lauder | | |
