= Otaqlı (disambiguation) =

Otaqlı is a village in Azerbaijan.

Otaqlı may also refer to:

- Otaqlu
- Otağlı, Damal
