= İnönü, Damal =

İnönü
- Neighbourhood
- Location in Turkey
- Coordinates: 41.3798°N 42.8924°E
- Country: Turkey
- Province: Ardahan
- District: Damal
- Municipality: Damal
- Population (2021): 146
- Time zone: UTC+3 (TRT)

İnönü (formerly: Üçdere) is a neighbourhood of the town Damal, Damal District, Ardahan Province, Turkey. Its population is 146 (2021).

The neighborhood is populated by Turkmens.
