= Catherine (video game) =

2011 video game

- Uncensored North American PS3 cover art featuring Catherine
- Developer: Atlus (Note: Original game developed by "2nd Creative Production Department", Full Body developed by Studio Zero)
- Publishers: JP: Atlus; NA: Atlus USA; PAL: Deep Silver; WW: Sega (Windows); Full Body: WW: Sega
- Directors: Katsura Hashino; Kenichi Goto (Full Body)
- Producer: Katsura Hashino
- Programmer: Yujiro Kosaka
- Artists: Shigenori Soejima; Kazuhisa Wada; Yasuhiro Akimoto (Full Body)
- Writers: Yuichiro Tanaka; Atsushi Kusama (Full Body)
- Composer: Shoji Meguro
- Engine: Gamebryo (Note: The original game was developed using Gamebryo, while Full Body uses Atlus' in-house game engine used in Persona 5.)
- Platforms: PlayStation 3; Xbox 360; Windows; PlayStation 4; PlayStation Vita; Nintendo Switch
- Release: February 17, 2011: Classic; PlayStation 3, Xbox 360; JP: February 17, 2011; NA: July 26, 2011; EU: February 10, 2012; AU: February 23, 2012 Windows; WW: January 10, 2019; Full Body; PlayStation 4; JP: February 14, 2019; WW: September 3, 2019 PlayStation Vita; JP: February 14, 2019 Nintendo Switch; JP: July 2, 2020; WW: July 7, 2020
- Genre: Puzzle
- Modes: Single-player, multiplayer

Catherine (Note: Kyasarin (Japanese: キャサリン)) is a puzzle video game developed by Atlus. The game was released for the PlayStation 3 and Xbox 360 in Japan and North America in 2011, in PAL regions by Deep Silver in 2012, and for Windows by Sega in 2019. A re-release with additional content, titled Catherine: Full Body, (Note: Kyasarin: Furu Bodi (キャサリン・フルボディ)) was released in 2019 for the PlayStation 4 worldwide and for the PlayStation Vita only in Japan, and a Nintendo Switch version released worldwide in 2020.

The story follows Vincent Brooks, a man who is beset by supernatural nightmares while torn between his feelings for his longtime girlfriend Katherine and the similarly named beauty Catherine. The gameplay is divided between the daytime, where Vincent interacts with the characters in a social simulation, and his dreams where he must navigate three-dimensional towers through combined platforming and puzzle-solving. The game's ending is affected by choices made by Vincent over the course of the story.

Catherine was developed by the same studio behind the Persona series, including producer and director Katsura Hashino, character designer Shigenori Soejima, and music composer Shoji Meguro. The game began production near the end of Persona 4's development in 2008, with the aim being to create something for a more adult audience. The English localization was handled by Atlus USA. Full Body was developed by Studio Zero, a then-newly formed division within Atlus led by Hashino. The team aimed to expand upon the original, bringing back the initial cast while adding a new love interest named Rin, short for Qatherine.

Reception was generally positive, with critics praising its mature subject matter and gameplay, although some criticism was directed towards its difficulty. In response, Atlus released a patch with an "Easy" mode. The game was nominated for several awards, and exceeded Atlus' sales expectations by having sold over one million copies worldwide by 2017.

== Gameplay ==
Gameplay screenshot of the character Vincent navigating through a Nightmare stage

Catherine is a cross-genre video game in which players control Vincent Brooks, a man who is tormented by deadly nightmares after becoming involved with multiple women. The gameplay is divided into two parts; daytime social simulation segments where Vincent interacts with various characters at the Stray Sheep bar, and nightmare segments where he navigates deadly block towers using a combination of platforming and puzzle solving. The game is split into three modes; the single-player story campaign dubbed "Golden Playhouse", and "Babel". Multiplayer-exclusive "Colosseum" challenge levels are unlocked after first completing the story.

The daytime gameplay involves Vincent interacting with his girlfriends and other characters in the Stray Sheep bar. During dialogue and text segments, Vincent can choose several options to respond; these include standard dialogue options and composing text messages. During his time in the Stray Sheep, Vincent can purchase drinks which help his navigation of Nightmare stages, but also impede his movement if he has too many. He can also play a minigame titled "Rapunzel" which mimics the gameplay in nightmares, or listen to a jukebox containing tracks from other Atlus games. Leaving the Stray Sheep will trigger the next Nightmare section.

The main gameplay takes place in the Nightmare stages. Vincent must climb towers made of blocks, which must be arranged into a stairway to reach the exit. As he climbs, the tower collapses beneath him, and if he fails to arrange the blocks before the collapse reaches him, Vincent will fall and the game ends; he either restarts from the last checkpoint on the tower if Vincent has a pillow item, or the player must restart the game from their last save. Blocks can be freely pushed and pulled, balanced on the edge of a similar block, and form stairways. In addition to standard blocks, some blocks have extra functions such as springing Vincent higher, and other blocks are lethal traps. Vincent can earn pillows that allow him to retry levels. There are also several items which can be found or purchased in between stages, such as spare blocks, lightning which removes enemies, and energy drinks that allow Vincent to climb more steps at a time.

Finishing a stage awards a score based on the time completed and items collected. These are posted on online leader boards accessed from the game's start menu. In addition to the Golden Playhouse mode, Babel Mode features four large stages playable with up to two players, while Colosseum features two players simultaneously playing a stage in order to reach the top first. The game has multiple endings depending on the choices made by the player during the course of the narrative.

Additional elements were added in Full Body. A new mode includes rearranged versions of the game's puzzles, with the original arrangement featuring as a separate mode. A new online multiplayer mode is also added, where players can enter both a randomised match or a contest with a player of equal rank. New character Rin can be called to halt the tower's collapse for a short time. Players can access a new difficulty level called "Safety", which removes all threats and the time limit, and allows players to skip puzzles and continue with the story.

== Synopsis ==
=== Setting and characters ===
Set in an unnamed city in the United States (in Full Body, the setting is redefined as the space colony of Neo-Brooklyn), the plot of Catherine is presented as a story within a story on Golden Playhouse, a television program described as "like a Saturday morning theatre, with a bit of a Twilight Zone vibe". The Stray Sheep, a bar where the main cast frequently meets, acts as the stage for the game's major events. The game focuses on four main characters:

- Vincent Brooks, a 32-year-old systems engineer who acts as the game's protagonist and player character. Unambitious and unenthusiastic, Vincent lives a stereotypical bachelor's life; he avoids the challenges of adulthood, including his uninspiring job, his rundown apartment, and his unwillingness to marry his girlfriend, Katherine. Vincent is voiced by Koichi Yamadera in Japanese, and Troy Baker in English.
- Catherine, a 22-year-old woman. She meets Vincent at the Stray Sheep seemingly by accident and ends up spending the night with him. This encounter, and Catherine's continued attempts to romance Vincent, become the catalyst for the game's events. Outwardly, Catherine is playful, seductive, and free-spirited; in reality, she is a succubus demon who tempts men for her own ends. Catherine is voiced by Miyuki Sawashiro in Japanese, and Laura Bailey in English.
- Katherine McBride, a 32-year-old woman working as an office manager at a clothing manufacturer. A childhood friend of Vincent's, they reconnected five years before the game's events and began dating. Katherine wishes to marry Vincent and is increasingly irritated by his indecisiveness. Katherine is voiced by Kotono Mitsuishi in Japanese, and Michelle Ruff in English.
- Rin, short for Qatherine, is a character exclusive to Full Body. An amnesiac who plays the piano at the Stray Sheep, Rin becomes a comforting presence during Vincent's journey. It is later revealed that Rin is in fact an otokonoko boy and part of a species of angel-like aliens sent to stop the Nightmares. Rin is voiced by Aya Hirano in Japanese, and Brianna Knickerbocker in English.

The supporting cast includes Vincent's regular drinking partners at the Stray Sheep: Orlando Haddick (Hiroaki Hirata/Liam O'Brien), an old friend and divorcee who holds cynical views on marriage; Johnny Ariga (Takehito Koyasu/Travis Willingham) an idealist and longtime friend searching for a soulmate; and Toby Nebbins (Kishō Taniyama/Yuri Lowenthal), Johnny's co-worker who has a crush on Erica Anderson (Junko Minagawa/Erin Fitzgerald) a waitress at the Stray Sheep who's been around her friends for a while. Thomas Mutton (Norio Wakamoto/Kirk Thornton), nicknamed "Boss", is the owner of the Stray Sheep. The game is narrated by Trisha, (Note: Known in Japanese as Rue☆Ishida (石田☆ルウ, Ishida☆Rū)) (Junko Minagawa/Erin Fitzgerald) who is the host of Golden Playhouse dubbed the "Midnight Venus".

=== Plot ===
Vincent Brooks is disillusioned due to his unwillingness to commit to marrying his longtime girlfriend, Katherine McBride. One night at the Stray Sheep Bar, a despondent, drunken Vincent meets an enigmatic young woman named Catherine; they have a one-night stand which turns into an affair. Simultaneously, Vincent begins experiencing surreal nightmares where he and other men must ascend a tower while outrunning terrifying demons; if they fail in the dream, they die in real life. Struggling with the stress of his double life and his delusional paranoia, which are intensified by his worsening nightmares, Vincent begins to lose his grip on reality and is eventually compelled to end the affair with Catherine. In a heated argument between Vincent, Catherine, and Katherine, who break out over having an affair with each other, Catherine is seemingly killed; however, the incident is revealed to have occurred in a nightmare from which Vincent and Katherine escape. The next day, Katherine — who retains no memory of the nightmare but grows furious after she guesses his infidelity — breaks off their relationship, refusing to believe that Vincent was unfaithful.

Vincent realizes he is the only person aware of Catherine's existence, and all her messages have vanished from his phone. Vincent confronts Mutton, the proprietor of the Stray Sheep; the only other person he has witnessed Catherine speaking to. He learns that Mutton is the Mesopotamian deity Dumuzid the Shepherd and that Catherine is a succubus who aided Mutton in his game to kill men who would not commit to marriage and family on the basis that the population growth for humanity is less than optimal. Vincent enters the nightmare world one last time on the condition that he and the other men will be freed if he reaches the top of the tower. Vincent is victorious and defeats Dumuzid, who is revealed to be an associate of Astaroth.

In Full Body, Rin moves in next door to Vincent after taking a job at the Stray Sheep playing piano. Vincent and Rin grow close, with Rin comforting him in his nightmares by playing the piano. During one meeting, Vincent accidentally discovers that Rin is an otokonoko male, which causes a rift between them following Vincent's shocked reaction. If Vincent chooses to reconnect, Rin appears in Vincent's nightmare and is captured by Mutton. Vincent rescues Rin by defeating Astaroth. Alternate endings for Katherine and Catherine are unlocked if Vincent sends them a recording of Rin's piano music.

From here, there are several possible endings, depending on the player's actions throughout the game:

- Katherine Endings: Vincent meets with Katherine and asks her to take him back. In the "bad" ending, she refuses. In the "good" ending, she forgives him after Mutton and Vincent's friends reveal his ordeal. In the "true" ending, they are married. In the Full Body ending, Katherine again leaves Vincent, gaining new self-confidence while fondly remembering her time with Vincent.
- Catherine Endings: Vincent summons Catherine and asks to marry her. In the "bad" ending, she refuses. In the "good" ending, she accepts that they live together in the Underworld despite the objections of Nergal, the Mesopotamian god of war and death and Catherine's father. In the "true" ending, Vincent overthrows Nergal, becoming the King of the Underworld with Catherine as his Queen. In the Full Body ending, Catherine transports Vincent back to his high school days and appears as a human, allowing them to fall in love, marry, and start a family.
- Freedom Endings: Vincent realizes he does not desire marriage. Having won against Mutton, he demands payment from him, which he immediately uses to bet on a women's wrestling match. In the "good" ending, he loses the bet. In the "true" ending, he wins and uses the money to fulfill his dream of visiting outer space.
- Rin Endings: In the "bad" ending, Rin leaves while wishing Vincent the best following Astaroth's defeat. In the "good" ending, Rin is revealed to be part of an alien race of "angels" after Rin's brother Archangel challenges Vincent to a final challenge to determine mankind's fate; Vincent wins, and he and Rin become a couple. In the "true" ending, Vincent becomes Rin's partner and music producer, organizing piano concerts for humans and many alien races.

In all of the game's endings, Trisha states in a closing narration that the purpose of Vincent's story and the player's actions in directing his story was to determine whether the player desired a life of comfort or excitement. She explains that the tower was a metaphor for the journey to adulthood, and that "there is no right way to climb the tower." In a secret ending unlocked when the player clears the game's challenge stages, known as the "Babel," Trisha speaks directly to the player and reveals that she is Ishtar, with Astaroth having been one of her avatars. Tired of Dumuzid's infidelity, the events of Catherine were a test to find someone worthy of her love. She offers to make the player into a deity so that they can become her consort.

== Development ==
Uncensored Japanese Xbox 360 cover art featuring Katherine. The differing covers of the 360 and PS3 versions were intended to catch consumer eyes in stores, and exemplify the contrasting appeal of the two heroines.

Catherine was developed by the "2nd Creative Production Department", a team within Atlus who had previously handled development for the Persona series, a subseries within the Megami Tensei franchise. Planning for Catherine began while the development team were performing final polishing work for Persona 4 prior to the latter's 2008 release. The three key staff members were all veterans of the Persona series: director and producer Katsura Hashino had helmed both Persona 3 and Persona 4; art director and character designer Shigenori Soejima had designed characters for both Persona 3 and Persona 4; and composer Shoji Meguro had created music for multiple Megami Tensei titles, including the Persona series. The chief designer was Kazuhisa Wada, while the chief programmer was Yujiro Kosaka.

Catherine was the first title developed by Atlus for high-definition (HD) video game consoles, specifically the PlayStation 3 (PS3) and Xbox 360 (360). Using HD consoles they were able to fully portray the world of Catherine. Despite the shift onto HD consoles making their vision easier to realize, debugging for multiple consoles caused problems that pushed back the planned development schedule. In a 2012 statement, an Atlus staff member said that Catherine was a "difficult" game for the company to make. The game would later be called a "test" for the development of Persona 5.

Catherine was first announced in August 2010, along with its prospective platforms. Upon its announcement, Catherine proved unexpectedly popular, garnering as much public attention and fan expectation as recent releases in the Persona series. Due to the game's content, Atlus found it difficult to gain their wished-for rating from Japan's CERO ratings board. Beginning from October 2010, Atlus and its then-parent Index Media began an "aggressive" advertising campaign to promote the title in Japan. Catherine released on February 17, 2011. A PS3 demo for the game was released in January, but in early February Atlus pulled the demo, stating that it had achieved the maximum number of planned downloads. Following player complaints about the game's difficulty, Atlus created a patch which added a lower difficulty. The patches for both the PS3 and 360 versions released in March. The PS3 version was released in mainland Asia on July 26, 2011, distributed by Softsource. The 360 version was not released in the region due to unspecified coding issues.

Different cover artwork was created by Soejima for the 360 and PS3 versions—the PS3 cover showed Catherine showing off her cleavage, while the 360 cover had Katherine lying on her front showing her behind. Soejima was originally told by Hashino to create covers that would catch people's eyes in stores; the different cover arts for different versions was chosen as they felt it would be interesting. The two characters were originally going to be in identical, near-naked poses. This was changed due to the character's different charms, which it was felt would be lost if they were posed in such a way. Soejima went through multiple cover designs, with one being the two characters holding different cutlery utensils. Hashino had little involvement beyond his initial instruction, but did ask that more of Katherine's back be shown in the image. The covers exemplified each character's contrasting appeal: Catherine's cleavage showed off her youthful beauty, while displaying Katherine's behind was meant to evoke her more motherly charms. This artwork was used for retail posters, but Atlus also created alternate artwork for stores that wanted something less risqué.

Catherine protagonist Vincent Brooks made a cameo appearance in Persona 3 Portable, the PlayStation Portable remake of Persona 3. The port's protagonists can run into Vincent, who makes reference to the events of Catherine. Vincent was included in Persona 3 Portable as it was created by the same development team as Catherine, but the version of Vincent in Persona 3 Portable is not the same as that used in Catherine. Despite the possibility, staff have discounted either an anime adaptation or further games in the series, the latter due to its challenging production.

=== Scenario and design ===
The aim with Catherine was to create a game that was not within the role-playing genre as with the majority of Atlus' titles, in addition to making something that was aimed at adults. The main aim was to create something new as a change prior to developing a new role-playing game. It used the third-party Gamebryo game engine. Hashino had wanted an in-house engine, but the team's lack of experience with HD consoles meant this was impractical. While they had the option of developing the title for handheld consoles or mobile devices, Hashino felt that the game would lose its charm on less powerful hardware.

The initial story was written by Hashino, who originally worked alone on the scenario before other writers were brought on to help. The scenario's main writer was Yuichiro Tanaka, previously lead writer for the Persona series. The setting incorporated both Japanese and American cultural influences. Hashino felt that Catherine was an ambitious title due to its themes and subject matter, saying that no-one but Atlus would have supported the project. The main theme is love between men and women, although in its infancy the project was themed around conflict. In order to make the love triangle between Vincent, Catherine and Katherine sound realistic, he asked other members of Atlus staff for their experiences. One story, where a woman detailed killing people in her dreams, was almost directly referenced within the game. Vincent was initially a very unlikeable character who willingly chose to cheat on Katherine, but based on staff feedback, he was adjusted to appear more sympathetic. As the main premise could not be changed, the team instead added Mutton's plot and worked to make Vincent a more sympathetic character within this framework.

Soejima, who had mainly worked on the Persona series up to this point, was most focused on making the characters' expressions seem realistic within the context of the story. All the characters were designed around being realistic, with their proportions being more akin to real people rather than stylized figures. According to him, he was influenced by the game's themes of instinctual desire intruding into everyday life, the desire for sleep, and the concept of greed. Vincent exemplified these themes. Vincent's character was based on and named after American actor Vincent Gallo, specifically his character Billy Brown in the 1998 film Buffalo '66. Likewise, the younger "Catherine" was modeled after Gallo's co-star Christina Ricci and was designed to be beautiful and youthful when compared to "Katherine", who had an adult charm. The pink coloring of the game's user interface was intended to evoke its sensual and "kitschy" atmosphere. The cutscenes were created by anime production studio Studio 4°C. While the Persona games up to that point boasted around half an hour of cutscenes, the number in Catherine came to considerably more. Studio 4°C spent around a year working on the anime cutscenes.

=== Localization ===
Catherine was initially not planned for a Western release. After an initial leak through listings on EB Games and GameStop, Atlus USA confirmed that Catherine would be released in North America. The game was localized for the West by Atlus USA, who had previously handled many of the company's earlier titles. Main localization staff included editors Mike Meeker and Clayton S. Chan; and quality assurance staff Scott Williams, Jonathon Reinhold, Kourtnie McKenzie, Allie Doyon and Charles Chaikaew. Compared to previous Atlus titles, which had focused on Japanese culture, Atlus USA had comparatively little work adjusting things for a Western audience as the game was set within an American city environment. Their main issue was with the dialogue, which was meant to be naturalistic despite some tongue-in-cheek dialogue, alongside jokes and references that needed adjusting so they would make sense to a Western audience. According to the localizers, the problem "[wasn't] translating the definition, it's translating the intent".

A major issue the team faced was with the quotes used in loading screens. While they were apparently all famous quotes, they had been taken from a Japanese book of quotes without any authors being mentioned, in addition to their translation into Japanese sometimes being poor. In the event, Atlus USA went with new quotes to put in their place rather than trying to identify and translate the existing quotes. The quotes used were from multiple sources, including Douglas Adams, George Carlin and Rodney Dangerfield. According to Chan, the main advantage of Catherine compared to other projects was that the situations and characters were ones he and other team members could understand rather than typical fantasy scenarios.

Atlus USA initially had difficulty persuading mainstream stores like Target and Walmart to take Catherine due to its suggestive cover art and marketing calling it an "adult" title, which was mostly associated with erotic games not sold in such stores. To convince them that the game was suitable for mainstream stores, Atlus USA put together a film reel of clips from unspecified triple-A games those stores did sell that featured more explicit content than Catherine. When they met the retailer representatives, they showcased the film and pointed out that Catherine had none of that content, before showing off the most explicit scenes in the game to prove their point. The retailers were convinced and allowed Catherine to be sold in mainstream stores, while also looking through their stocks after seeing the content of currently-stocked titles. As with the Japanese version, Atlus used alternate covers for the 360 and PS3 versions, and alternate versions of those covers toning down the suggestive elements for stores catering to more sensitive consumers. Catherine released in North America on July 26, 2011. In addition to the standard edition, a special limited "Love is Dead" edition was created for both PS3 and 360.

Though initial statements from Atlus said that Catherine would not be released in Europe, its release in the region was leaked through a rating for the 360 version in Germany. Its official release was confirmed in a press release from Atlus shortly after the leak. The title was published by Deep Silver across all PAL territories, and featured written language support for English, Spanish, German, French, and Italian. Deep Silver was chosen as the publisher as they shared Atlus' enthusiasm about the game. Catherine released in Europe on February 10, 2012. As with North America, the PS3 and 360 versions had a limited special edition. Called the "Stray Sheep Edition" after a central location in the game, it had differing content to the North American edition. In Australia, the title was distributed by QV Software. The PS3 version released on February 16, while the 360 version released on February 23. A Microsoft Windows version, titled Catherine Classic, was published worldwide by Sega on January 10, 2019 through Steam. This port was the first modern Atlus title ported to the platform, as the company were previously averse to it. The port included expanded graphics options, controller customization, and the English and Japanese voice tracks.

Since release, Catherine has occasionally been played competitively in esport tournaments. The game's professional scene began when FGC member David "Dacidbro" Broweleit desired to learn the insides of the game's engine. The first notable tournament was an event called Super NorCal Install, which took place in 2012. The tournament would become the basis for the game's competitive scene. Publisher Atlus would later officially sponsor the game as a side event at Evo 2015, while streaming it on their Twitch account. The attention surrounding the event would later carry on into Evo 2016, CEOtaku 2016, Genesis 4, as well as a dedicated event in San Jose called The King of Catherine, which had awarded a US$5,000 prize pool to winners. Speaking later, the developers said they were surprised with how popular the game became in the international esports scene.

==== Voice cast ====
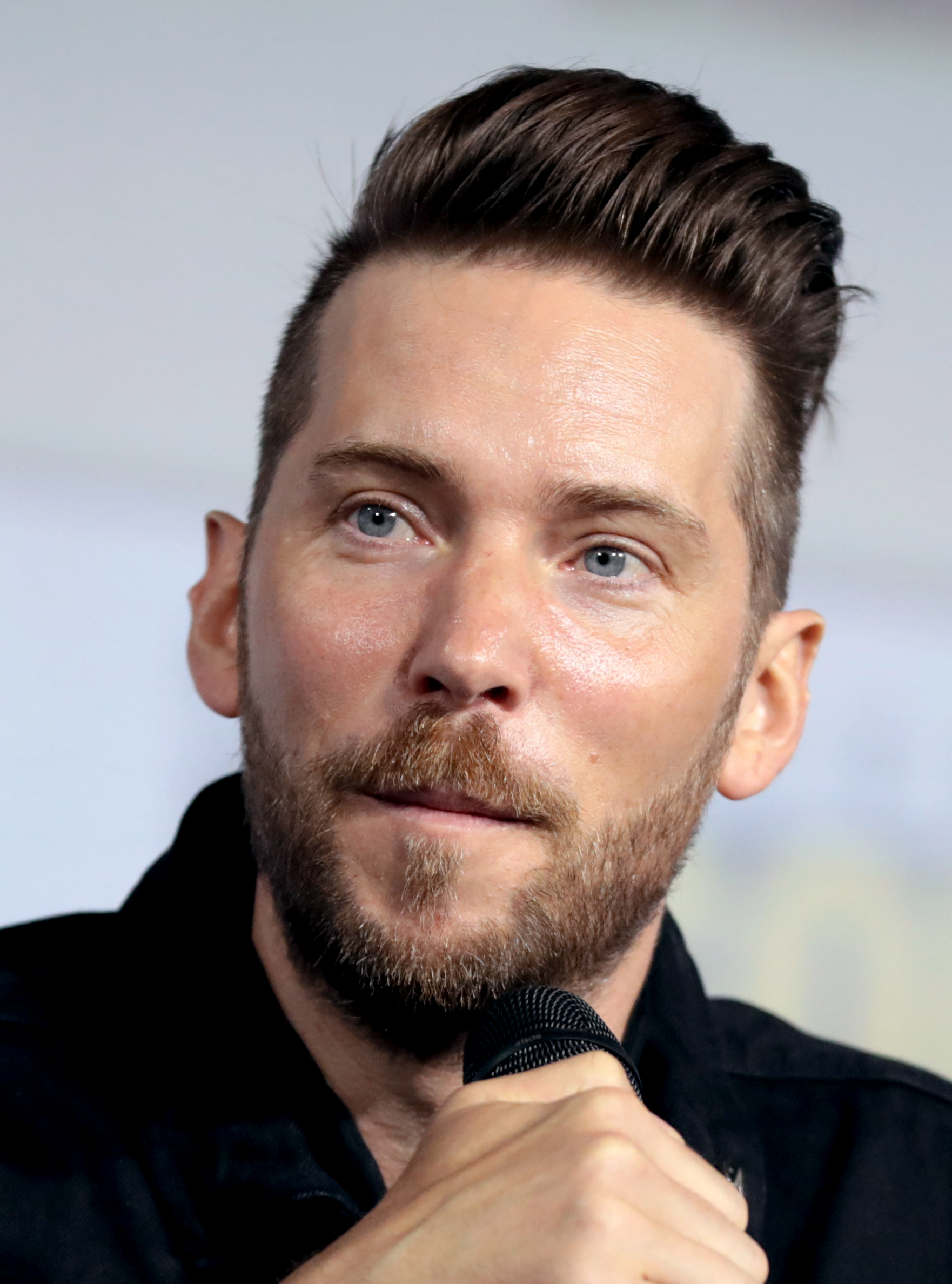
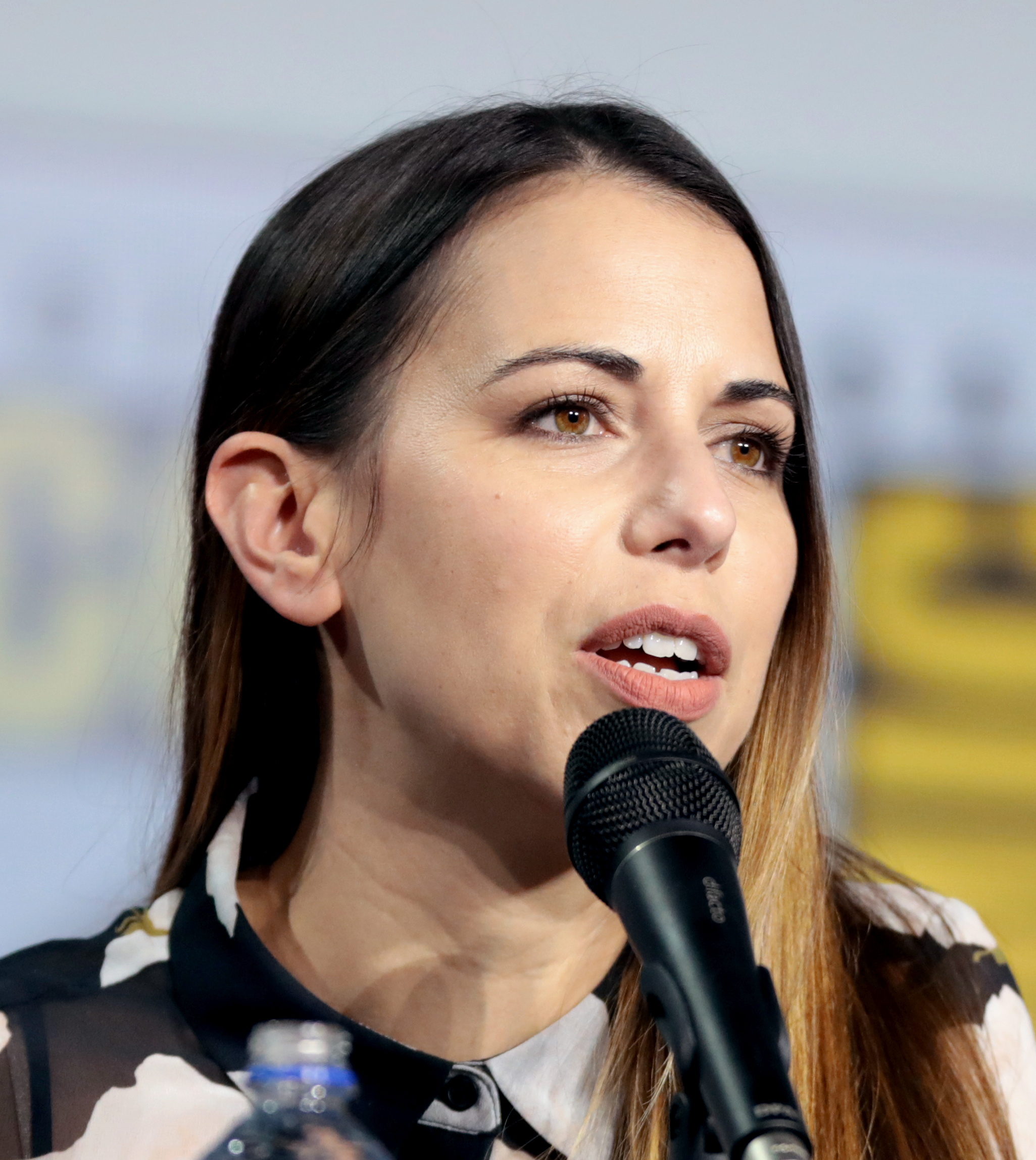
Troy Baker (left) and Laura Bailey (right) were the respective English voices for Vincent and Catherine. Describing the localization as a positive experience, they were free to adlib with their respective characters.

Valerie Arem of PCB Productions was the voice director for dubbing. Rather than recording as a team, each actor recorded their lines separately. Baker, Bailey and Willingham, the respective voices of Vincent, Catherine and Johnny, described the voice recording period as a positive experience, reinforced by the fact that they were all old friends. Baker noted that it was a relative rarity for this to be the case in general voice acting. Ruff, the voice of Katherine, was helped in her performance by both Arem and Atlus staff. In contrast to the majority of Japanese game localizations, the lip movements for some cutscenes were adjusted so they would sync with the English voices. This was done to give the acting and performances a more natural feel. This meant that the voice actors had more freedom to adlib parts of their performance: a cited example was the fight between Katherine and Catherine, where the two actresses ad-libbed the majority of the characters' argument. The aim for realism also meant that the performances were more restrained than those given for Japanese anime, which leaned towards stylized performances. For real-time cutscenes, lines had to be matched with gestures and line lengths to within 0.2 seconds; the Atlus staff needed to go through the Japanese script and create a dedicated column for speaking times, then they acted out the lines themselves so they had a reference for the voice actors, and finally they would allow an actor to alter things a little to suit their performance and document those changes so the subtitles matched.

Baker, Bailey and Ruff had all previously worked with Atlus on the Persona series: Ruff voiced Yukari Takeba in Persona 3 while Baker and Bailey respectively voiced Kanji Tatsumi and Rise Kujikawa from Persona 4. In an interview, Baker described the Atlus USA staff as giving him and the other English actors a great deal of freedom when it came to delivering lines and portraying their characters. He noted that the themes in Catherine were far more controversial compared to earlier titles he and Atlus had worked on, and that it was a unique voice acting opportunity. Bailey was working on another Atlus project when she was offered the opportunity to voice Catherine. Having already heard of the project in the press, Bailey accepted the offer; during her time recording lines, she found the experience strange as she considered Baker to be a brotherly figure, starkly contrasting the relationship between Vincent and Catherine.

Ruff was offered the role of Katherine based on her acting abilities and her previous work with Atlus. She saw some footage of Katherine to get a feeling for her relationship with Vincent, but did not try to sync her performance with the Japanese. This was partly because of the planned English sync adjustments, and partly because she heard Japanese voice recording and cutscene finalization was still in progress. This was confirmed by Arem in a separate interview. Arem described each main actor's strengths during recording: Baker had good timing when it came to delivering his lines, Bailey required few retakes, while Ruff was able to realistically convey a variety of emotions. She also noted the work done by Fitzgerald, the voice actress for both Trisha and Erica; Fitzgerald had difficulty with the timing for Trisha's lines, but managed to "pull it off". The amount of voice acting involved was so large that the actors felt they could not finish it. Looking back on the production, Arem said she would not recast any of the characters.

=== Catherine: Full Body ===
Cover art of the Full Body version featuring both heroines in front of new character Qatherine (Rin)

Catherine: Full Body was developed by Studio Zero, an internal team founded by Hashino after the release of Persona 5 with multiple Persona staff. Hashino envisioned the game as the definitive version of Catherine, the aim being to present the team's mission to create new and innovative gaming experiences by returning to one of their more unconventional titles. Hashino and Soejima returned as producer and character designer respectively. The director was Kenichi Goto, who worked as battle planner for the PlayStation 2 Devil Summoner games and Persona 5. Studio 4°C returned to produce twenty more anime cutscenes. The game was ported directly into the in-house engine used by Atlus for the Persona Dancing games and Persona 5. The gameplay was tweaked based on fan feedback, and easier difficulty was added so players could enjoy the story. The game includes downloadable content (DLC) that features Persona 5 protagonist Joker (Jun Fukuyama/Xander Mobus) as a playable guest character in the Babel and Colosseum modes, along with two new cutscenes featuring the Persona 5 cast.

The keyword for the project was "diversity", expressed in both the narrative and the unconventional gameplay compared to other titles on the market. Rin was included in Full Body as part of Hashino's wish to update the game's sensibilities and subject matter based on current trends. When asked to create a third "Catherine", Soejima was initially unsure how to proceed. As he designed Catherine and Katherine as "hot" and "cool" respectively, he chose a "cute" design for Rin. Soejima designed Rin around a lack of aggression, from the character's expression and coloring reflecting this. Hashino also asked Soejima to redesign Trisha's hairstyle, which was changed into twin bun-style afros on either side of her head.

The game was released in Japan on February 14, 2019. A notable addition to the Japanese version was a choice of eleven different voice actresses for Catherine, ten of which were DLC. All the actresses had previously played adulterous characters. The voice available in the base game is the original voice by Sawashiro. The Japanese DLC actresses were Mamiko Noto, Ami Koshimizu, Aoi Yūki, Yui Horie, Kana Asumi, Haruka Tomatsu, Megumi Toyoguchi, Rie Kugimiya, Rina Satō, and Nana Mizuki. Each actress portrayed Catherine with a different personality, with Noto's version being described as a "yandere lady".

The original Japanese and English voice cast reprised their roles for new dialogue, with Aya Hirano and Brianna Knickerbocker voicing the character of Rin in Japanese and English respectively. The localization team had to translate roughly 165,000 Japanese characters and over 6,000 new lines of spoken dialogue. As the original script altered several established lines, the team constantly referenced the Japanese script and worked hard to smoothly incorporate new and original text. While the team could have recast due to the lapse of time between the original and Full Body, the team wanted to "preserve the integrity" of Full Body and so brought back the entire main cast and most of the supporting cast. There were problems with how some voices had aged over the past eight years, and due to concerns over Baker's voice the team opted not to re-record a scene where Vincent screamed for 20 seconds. A notable adjustment for the Western release of Full Body was the crediting and dialogue for the transgender character Erica. She was originally referred to in the English credits using her birth name with her chosen name in parentheses. The Japanese version of Full Body retained this, but Atlus changed it for the Western release to use Erica's chosen name. This is notable because the game appeared in the news following public debate over whether the original credits were transphobic. Some dialogue within the game related to Erica was also changed for similar reasons. The PS4 version was released by Atlus in North America and Europe on September 3, 2019. For the European version, the localizers had the extra task of translating the text into French, Spanish, Italian and German. The lack of an English localization for the Vita version was attributed to the console's discontinuation outside of Japan that year. A Nintendo Switch version was announced during a Nintendo Direct in March 2020 titled Catherine: Full Body for Nintendo Switch in Japan and simply Catherine: Full Body in the west. It was released on July 2, 2020 in Japan and July 7, 2020 internationally. The Nintendo Switch version includes all downloadable content in the game.

=== Music ===
Meguro began working on the first demo tracks for the game in August 2009. Meguro worked as the main composer, leading a team composed of himself, Kenichi Tsuchiya, Atsushi Kitajoh, and Toshiki Konishi. Kitajoh was the general coordinator and managed sound effects for the action scenes. Meguro did not have much freedom with the project, as Hashino was specific about what he wanted the music to be like, giving him the key words of "classic", "adult oriented" and "erotic". The music team used multiple genres for the music in Catherine, switching genre depending on the flow of gameplay; action segments used reorchestrations of classical music, quiet moments used jazz, and the animated cutscenes used symphonic-based music. As the animated cutscenes were produced by an external company, Meguro found creating music for them difficult when compared to previous projects of his, as he had to sync the music to something he had no creative input with. Meguro was highly impressed by both the sound quality compared to his previous work, and the amount of control he had to adjust the relative volume of music and sound effects. Rapper L-VOKAL contributed to the score.

For Full Body, in addition to Meguro's original work on the score, music company Inspion Izene was brought on to both arrange and add to the soundtrack. The company had previously helped with the original game's sound design, and were brought in to help distinguish the game's sound from that of the Persona series and its parent Megami Tensei. L-VOKAL returned to help remix tracks. Inspion Izene composed seventeen new tracks for the game. The theme song for the game is "Re:set" by Sekai no Owari. The theme was performed by Chinese singer Satsuki; the team wanted a voice that would stand out, so they sought out a foreign singer who could speak Japanese.

== Reception ==
Reception

Aggregate score
Aggregator	Score
Metacritic	PS3: 79/100; X360: 82/100; PC: 80/100; PS4: 81/100; NS: 80/100

Review scores
Publication	Score
Computer and Video Games	8/10
GameSpot	8.5/10
GamesRadar+	8/10
GameTrailers	7.8/10
IGN	9/10
The Telegraph	4/5

Catherine received mostly positive reviews, according to review aggregator platform Metacritic. In an import review, GamesRadar praised the story, but criticized the game's difficulty due to random enemy AI, though they later gave the English release 8/10, citing changes had removed most of the game's annoyances. Some Japanese gamers complained that the game was too difficult, thus making Atlus release a patch that included an easier difficulty mode. Tom Bissell of Grantland, was pleasantly surprised by the game and gave it a very positive review.

In 2013, Liz Lanier of Game Informer included Catherine and Katherine among the top ten female villains in video games, stating that "Vincent can't catch a break between Catherine seducing him one minute and manipulating him the next; Katherine isn't much better with her passive-aggressive push toward marriage. Considering both appear as horrifying boss battles, they can easily be any man's worst nightmare." In 2014, David Auerbach of Slate claimed Catherine to be sexist, writing that its treatment of relationships and sex exemplified a misogynous tendency in video game culture that became a topic of media discussion over the next several years. Among other complaints, Auerbach claimed that the game is "a bellwether for what tech culture and gaming have come to mean for a lot of men: a safe playspace from the realities that they believe women force on them."

Emily Short, a game writer and designer, wrote that she found the game's characters generally unsympathetic for a variety of reasons. She was also annoyed by its approach to gender roles due to its negative message about women in relationships and lack of non-standard relationship types, describing the narrative as "both misogynist and misandrist" despite late-game attempts to recognise the complexity of gender relations. In a 2011 feature on faith in video game narratives, GameSpot said that the game succeeded in "personalizing the emotional weight of everyday sin" without carrying an overtly Christian message.

=== Sales ===
The PlayStation 3 version topped the Japanese charts in its opening week with over 140,000 copies sold while the Xbox 360 version came in 7th with over 21,000, and was able to outsell Marvel vs. Capcom 3: Fate of Two Worlds, which was released on the same day, by a margin of two-to-one. The game has also been commercially successful in America, selling 78,000 copies across both systems to consumers in its first six days, making it Atlus' biggest launch yet for a game. The game had sold around 500,000 copies by the end of 2011, being a huge success for the company; 260,000 copies were sold in Japan and 230,000 in North America. By 2017, the original game had shipped one million copies worldwide. The PC port of the original game was among the best-selling new releases of the month on Steam. (Note: Based on total revenue for the first two weeks on sale)

Upon its Japanese debut, the PS4 version of Full Body reached second place in the sales charts with sales of nearly 52,000 units. The Vita version was thirteenth with sales of over 9,000 units, with combined sales being just over 61,000 units. This was considerably less than the original game's regional debut. It remained in the top 20 best-selling into early March.

=== Awards ===
Award	Category	Result	Ref.
Annie Awards	Best Animated Video Game	Nominated	
NAVGTR Awards	Game of the Year	Nominated	
NAVGTR Awards	Direction in a Game Cinema	Nominated	
NAVGTR Awards	Lead Performance in a Drama — Troy Baker as "Vincent Brooks"	Nominated	
NAVGTR Awards	Supp Performance in a Drama — Michelle Ruff as "Katherine McBride"	Won	
NAVGTR Awards	Supp Performance in a Drama — Yuri Lowenthal as "Tobias Nebbins"	Nominated	
NAVGTR Awards	Use of Sound in New IP	Nominated	
NAVGTR Awards	Writing in a Drama	Won	
NAVGTR Awards	Game — Original Adventure	Nominated	
