= Eskikılıç, Damal =

Eskikılıç
- Village
- Location within Turkey
- Coordinates: 41°19′N 42°52′E
- Country: Turkey
- Province: Ardahan
- District: Damal
- Population (2021): 440
- Time zone: UTC+3 (TRT)

Eskikılıç is a village in the Damal District, Ardahan Province, Turkey. Its population is 440 (2021). The village is populated by Turkmens.
