= Yuri Lowenthal =

American voice actor (born 1971)

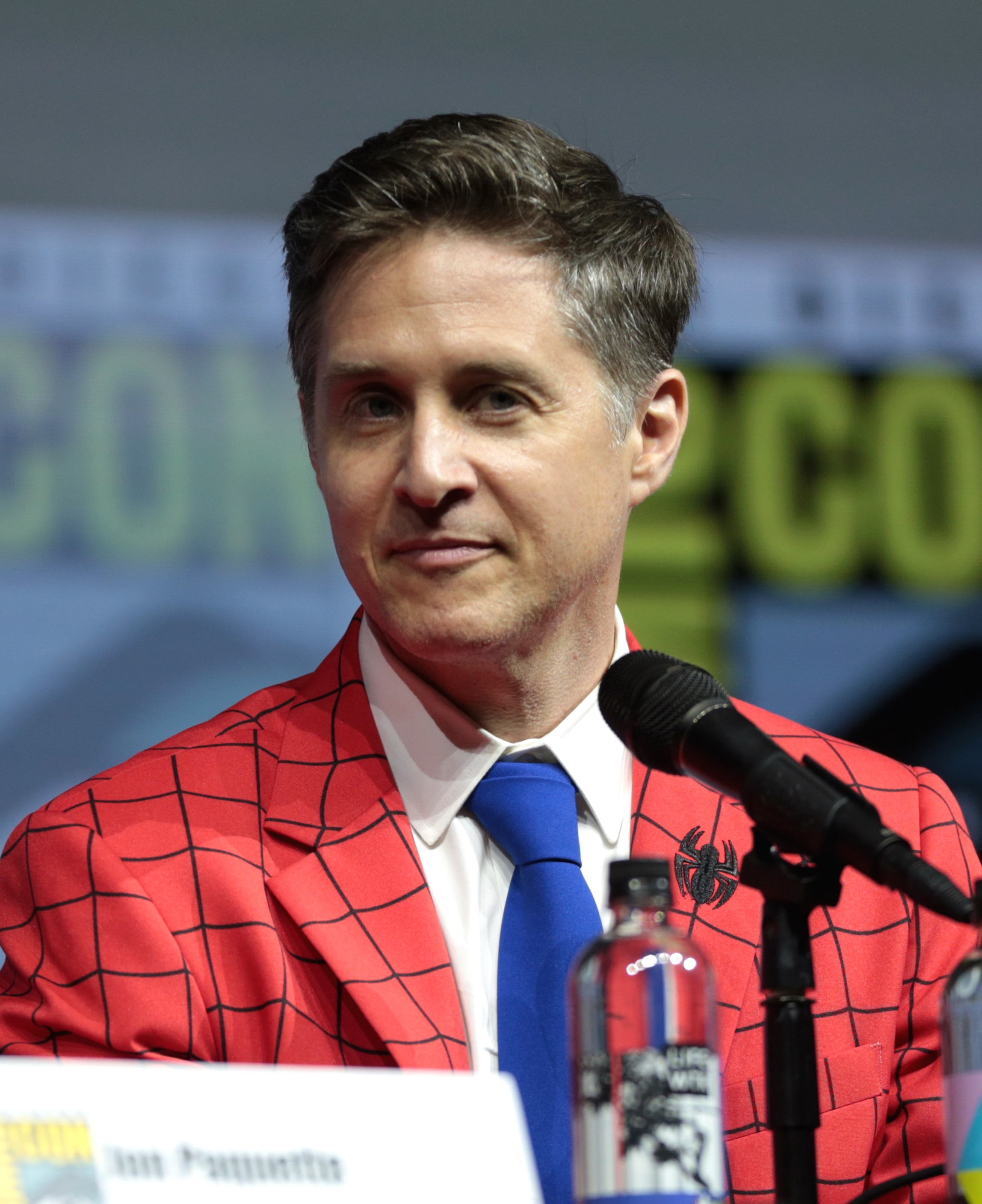
- Lowenthal at the 2018 San Diego Comic-Con
- Born: March 5, 1971 (age 55); Alliance, Ohio, U.S.
- Other names: Sean Roberts (Note: As credited in Marmalade Boy); Jimmy Benedict (Note: As credited in Hanaukyo Maid Team, Saiyuki Reload, Kyo Kara Maoh!, and Wild Grinders)
- Education: College of William and Mary (BA); New York University
- Occupations: Voice actor; producer; screenwriter
- Years active: 1995–present
- Works: Full list
- Spouse: Tara Platt (m. 2001)
- Children: 1
- Website: yurilowenthal.com

Yuri Lowenthal (born March 5, 1971) is an American voice actor known for his work in cartoons, anime, and video games. Some of his prominent voice roles in video games include Peter Parker / Spider-Man in various video games associated with the character, notably the incarnation featured in the Marvel's Spider-Man series by Insomniac Games and in Marvel Rivals by NetEase Games, Lorath Nahr in Blizzard Entertainment's Diablo III, The Prince in Ubisoft's Prince of Persia, Hayate/Ein in Dead or Alive, Courier 6 (male variant) in Obsidian Entertainment's Fallout: New Vegas, Matt Miller in Saints Row: The Third and Saints Row IV, The Protagonist in Persona 3, Yosuke Hanamura in Persona 4, Pure Vanilla Cookie in Cookie Run: Kingdom, and Dainsleif in Genshin Impact. His roles in animation include Sasuke Uchiha in Naruto, teenage Ben Tennyson in Ben 10, Jinnosuke in Afro Samurai, Simon in Gurren Lagann and Suzaku Kururugi in Code Geass.

He has a production company, Monkey Kingdom Productions, with his wife, Tara Platt, which has produced several feature films and a live-action web series called Shelf Life. He co-authored the book Voice-Over Voice Actor.

== Early life and education ==
Yuri Lowenthal was born in Alliance, Ohio, on March 5, 1971, but raised in Nashville, Tennessee, later moving to Northern Virginia. His father worked for the United States Agency for International Development and he spent two years in Niger in Africa. He did not do much acting until the end of high school when he tried out for drama class in his senior year, but it was enough to get him interested in acting, he also joined his high school gymnastics team in his sophomore year. His early exposure to anime was from shows such as Speed Racer, Star Blazers, and Battle of the Planets.

At The College of William & Mary in Williamsburg, Virginia, Lowenthal took classes in theatre but majored in East Asian studies where in his third year, he studied abroad in Osaka, Japan. He also participated in the school's gymnastics program and ROTC. After graduating in 1993, he joined the Japan Exchange and Teaching Programme (JET) where he served as a Coordinator of International Relations, helping out foreign English teachers in Shiga Prefecture. While at JET, he continued to participate in theatre and acting. After two years there, he still wanted to try acting full-time, and moved to New York City and participated in theatre in off-off-Broadway shows. He spent six years in New York doing theatre and indie films.

== Voice-over career ==
Yuri Lowenthal moved to Los Angeles and worked in live-action and theatre roles. To supplement his on-camera work, he and his wife Tara Platt took a voice-over class taught by Rick Zieff. Zieff later happened to be directing the English dub for an anime show called SD Gundam Force; he got his first ever anime dub role there and soon tried out for other anime roles as well as other voice-over work in animation, commercials, and video games. Lowenthal recalled that his first voice appearance in a video game might have also been for SD Gundam Force.

Lowenthal's first major role in video game voice-overs was as the Prince in Ubisoft's Prince of Persia: The Sands of Time. In an interview with Critical Gamer, he describes that role as "a very lucky break for me, because it ended up being a super game. We audition all the time for all different kinds of projects, and video games are one part of that, a part that I love." He said that "[he felt] that [he] in a way originated that role". Lowenthal did not return to voice the Prince in Warrior Within, being replaced by Robin Atkin Downes. Lowenthal felt that this was a conscious decision by Ubisoft to fit in with the game's overall tonal shift and thought it was the right decision. For Prince of Persia: The Two Thrones, he returned to play the role, as fans had stated their preference for his portrayal of the character. The Prince became one of Lowenthal's favorite roles, and he was pleased to return to the role for The Forgotten Sands. According to Lowenthal, his well-received performance put pressure on him in future games from both fans and staff, as he needed to remain true to and improve on his original portrayal. This ultimately gave him little creative freedom with the character after The Sands of Time. For the reboots following the live-action films, the staff wanted a different portrayal of the Prince to Lowenthal's, and so recast the role.

Lowenthal continued voicing in other anime shows, including the lead character Haru Glory in Rave Master, which had a run on Cartoon Network's Toonami line up. He also voiced a character in Zatch Bell! which had a notable run on Cartoon Network. He starred in a number of anime shows such as: Girls Bravo where he played Yukinari, Scrapped Princess where he voiced Leo Skorpus, Kyo Kara Maoh!, where he voiced Yuuri Shibuya, and Saiyuki Reload where he voiced Son Goku. When he auditioned for Naruto, which was being directed by the same person who did Rave Master, he had tried out for multiple roles including Sasuke Uchiha and Iruka, and got a call back for Sasuke. In an interview with Silionera, Lowenthal said that "It certainly allows me to go to some dark places as the series continues. And it makes Sasuke that much more interesting as a character. And that much more fun to play." The Naruto anime became one of the more popular anime shows in the U.S., and its sequel Naruto: Shippuden has also aired on Adult Swim.

In 2007, Lowenthal was cast as Jinnosuke, or "Kuma", a teddy-bear-headed warrior, in the anime feature Afro Samurai which starred Samuel L. Jackson as the title character. In an interview with Eastern Kicks, Lowenthal said that what he liked about Jinno was that he "starts off as one guy and ends up in a very different, very very dark place. Plus I got to kick Sam Jackson's ass. And they keep bringing him back from the dead for me to play again. And he's a twin-sword-wielding insane cyborg death machine with a giant teddy bear head. What's not to like?" He also said that they recorded the voicing for Afro Samurai separately so he did not get to meet Jackson personally until a release party for the related video game years later. Luke Carroll of Anime News Network described Lowenthal's voicing as a "good performance" but "not enough to make it more than an average dub at best". Dennis Amith of J-ENT! thought the voice acting was well done. Lowenthal would reprise the role in the 2009 feature Afro Samurai: Resurrection. Steve Fritz of Newsarama wrote "The action sequencing is still top notch, and the vocal performances from Jackson, [Lucy] Liu, Lowenthal and company is on the money."

Other lead roles in anime include Suzaku Kururugi in Code Geass, which ran on Adult Swim, and Simon in Gurren Lagann, which ran on Toonami.

In 2006, Lowenthal landed the role of Superman in the animated series Legion of Super Heroes. In an interview with The Oklahoman, Lowenthal recalled that he read for Lightning Lad and Brainiac 5 in the original audition, and was called back to do Superman. During the callback, he had begun reading for Superman and Brainiac 5 when the producers stopped him. He was later informed that he got the main role, and they did not need to hear more of him on other parts.

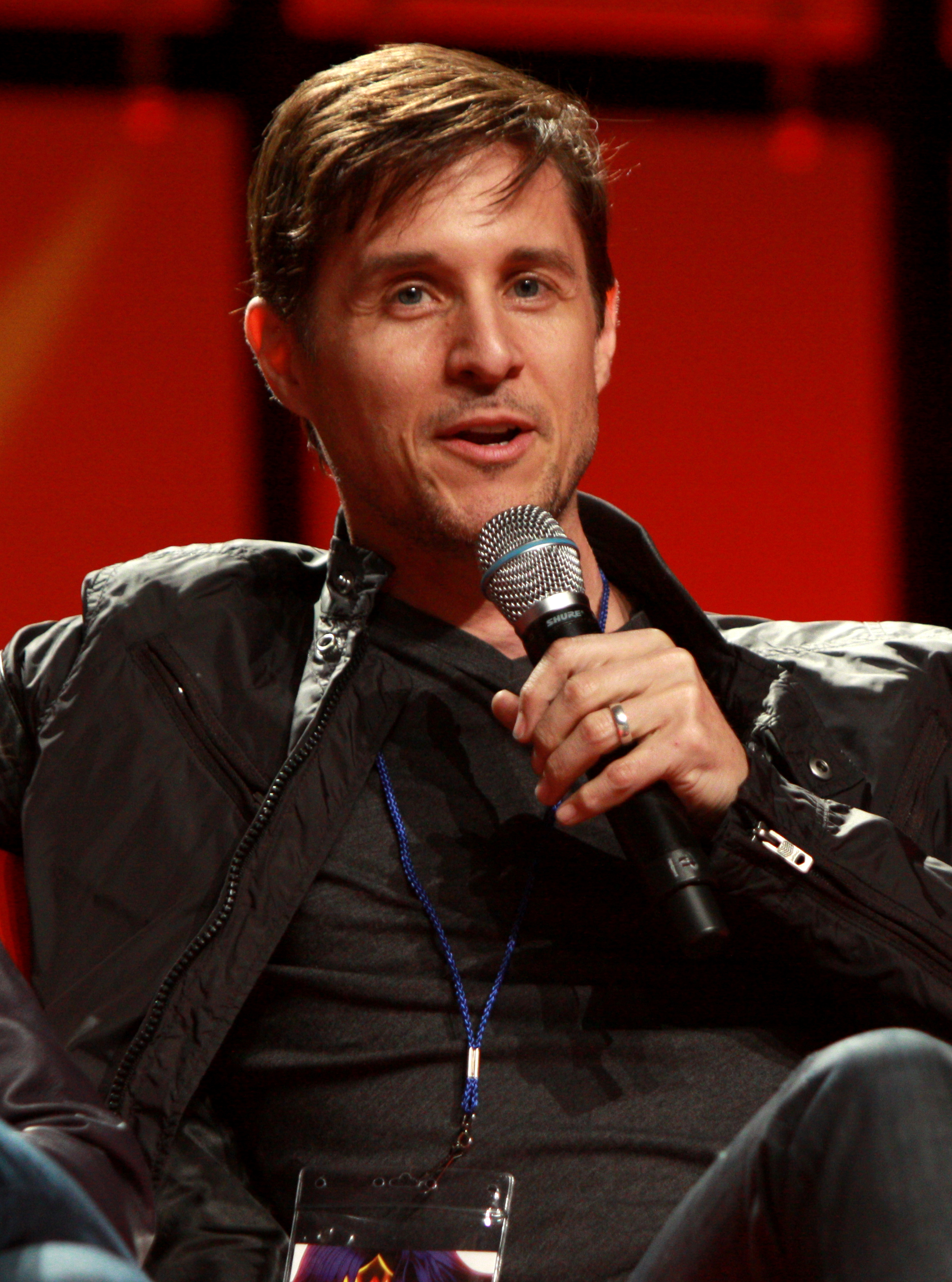
Lowenthal at the Phoenix Comicon in 2013

In 2008, Lowenthal provided the voice of 15-year-old Ben Tennyson in Ben 10: Alien Force. Set five years after the original series, the premiere of Alien Force set ratings records for Cartoon Network in its key demographics. In portraying Ben, Lowenthal was given guidance by series director Glen Murakami, whom he had worked with on Teen Titans: Trouble in Tokyo. Early on in the show, Murakami told Lowenthal to portray Ben as less of a wisecracker than his 10-year-old self, and did not want Ben to "veer into the whining, Luke Skywalker". The show was renewed for a second season, and would be followed by Ben 10: Ultimate Alien which ran from 2010 to 2012, and Ben 10: Omniverse, which ran from 2012 to 2014. In Ultimate Alien, Ben's age was bumped up to 16 years old. Lowenthal said that he did not realize how popular the show was outside North America until he went to Australia, England and Ireland, and saw kids wearing Ben 10 merchandise. He also said that at comic conventions, he was able to walk the halls unbothered until the Ben 10 panel, after which he was "outed". Lowenthal has also been involved in The Swan Princess direct-to-video series starting in 2012 with The Swan Princess Christmas where he was the voice of Prince Derek, and then in 2014 with The Swan Princess: A Royal Family Tale and in 2016 for The Swan Princess: Princess Tomorrow, Pirate Today where he reprised the main role. Of these videos, he also served as the screenwriter on Christmas and Royal Family Tale.

Lowenthal voiced Zane in Lego Ninjago: Nindroids in 2014. In the same year, he also voiced Bedman in the English dub of Guilty Gear Xrd -Sign-, the first game in the Guilty Gear Xrd subseries. Lowenthal also provided the voice for the protagonist in Persona 3 and Yosuke Hanamura for Persona 4. He also provides the voice of Cecil Harvey in the Nintendo DS remake of Final Fantasy IV, and again in Dissidia: Final Fantasy on the PSP. In the Dead or Alive series, he voices Hayate / Ein. He voices Matt Miller, the leader of the Decker gang in Saints Row: The Third; and in its sequel. Since 2020, he has voiced Dainsleif in Genshin Impact, narrating nearly all the "Collected Miscellany" videos for new characters. Lowenthal also voiced Lorath Nahr in Blizzard Entertainment's Diablo III, and while fans presumed he would reprise his voice acting for the upcoming Diablo IV, actor Ralph Ineson replaced Lowenthal as the voice. Lowenthal voiced and provided the motion-capture performance for Spider-Man/Peter Parker in Sony's Marvel's Spider-Man (2018) for the PS4 and reprised the role in Marvel's Spider-Man: Miles Morales (2020) and Marvel's Spider-Man 2 (2023); he had previously voiced Spider-Man in the mobile version of The Amazing Spider-Man 2 video game, and the mobile game Spider-Man Unlimited (2014). He also voices Spider-Man in Marvel Rivals. Kirk McKeand of Eurogamer described Lowenthal as "the man you've killed the most" for his roles in over 200 video games.

In February 2023, Lowenthal guest voiced Benni Baro, a teenage scavenger and ipsium miner, in Star Wars: The Bad Batch. Later in 2023, Lowenthal also voiced Tomas Vrbada / Smoke, a ninja specializing in stealth and smoke-based attacks, in Mortal Kombat 1.

In early 2024, he appeared as the "Default Helldiver Voice 2" voice pack in Helldivers 2. In August 2024, he was cast to voice Viscous, a green gooey sea creature, in Deadlock.

== Acting and production career ==
Lowenthal has been involved in several live-action projects with his company Monkey Kingdom Productions with wife Tara Platt. In 2008, they produced Con Artists, a mockumentary that chronicles some of their convention visits. They produced a psychological thriller film called Tumbling After which garnered an Award of Merit at the Accolade Film Festival. In 2011, Lowenthal and Platt produced Shelf Life, a web series where they act as action figures in a Toy Story-like environment, but with more adult humor. Lowenthal said in an interview that he wanted to make a show for nerds: "I wanted to make the kind of thing that my friends and I would watch. It's got the four S's: Sex, Social commentary, Slapstick and Superheroes." In 2014, they produced a short steampunk-themed film called Topsy McGee vs. the Sky Pirates which was an official selection at the New York City International Film Festival and was a finalist at the Dragon Con Independent Short Film Festival in the steampunk category.

In 2010, Lowenthal starred as the title character in Van Von Hunter, a live-action mockumentary co-directed by Tokyopop founder Stuart Levy, based on the comics of the same name. In the film, he plays a sword-swinging barbarian from a fantasy world who is thrown into Earth and is cast in a sword and sorcery movie. The film was featured in several film festivals, and was an official selection at Fantasia Film Festival and a special audience award at MockFest 2010. Lowenthal won an award for best character at MockFest as well.

He co-wrote the screenplay for The Arcadian, a film by Dekker Dreyer that was inspired by underground science fiction comics of the 1970s and 1980s. In 2015, he joined Wil Wheaton's web series Titansgrave as a starring cast member which he role-plays a character named S'Lethkk. The series is broadcast by Geek & Sundry. In 2016, he starred as Glenn Lauder in the Keith Arem-produced film The Phoenix Incident, about four friends who are caught up in a conspiracy surrounding the Phoenix lights UFO sighting. The film received awards and nominations at film festivals. He is slated to participate in an independent film called Any Bullet Will Do which stars Mark Ryan and was filmed in Montana.

Lowenthal and Platt co-authored the book Voice-Over Voice Actor: What It's Like Behind the Mic, released in 2010. He also co-authored the comedy-noir novella Tough City with Keith Ikeda-Barry as part of a 72-hour novel writing contest. It was released in 2013. In 2016, he released the novella as a weekly podcast series.

== Personal life ==
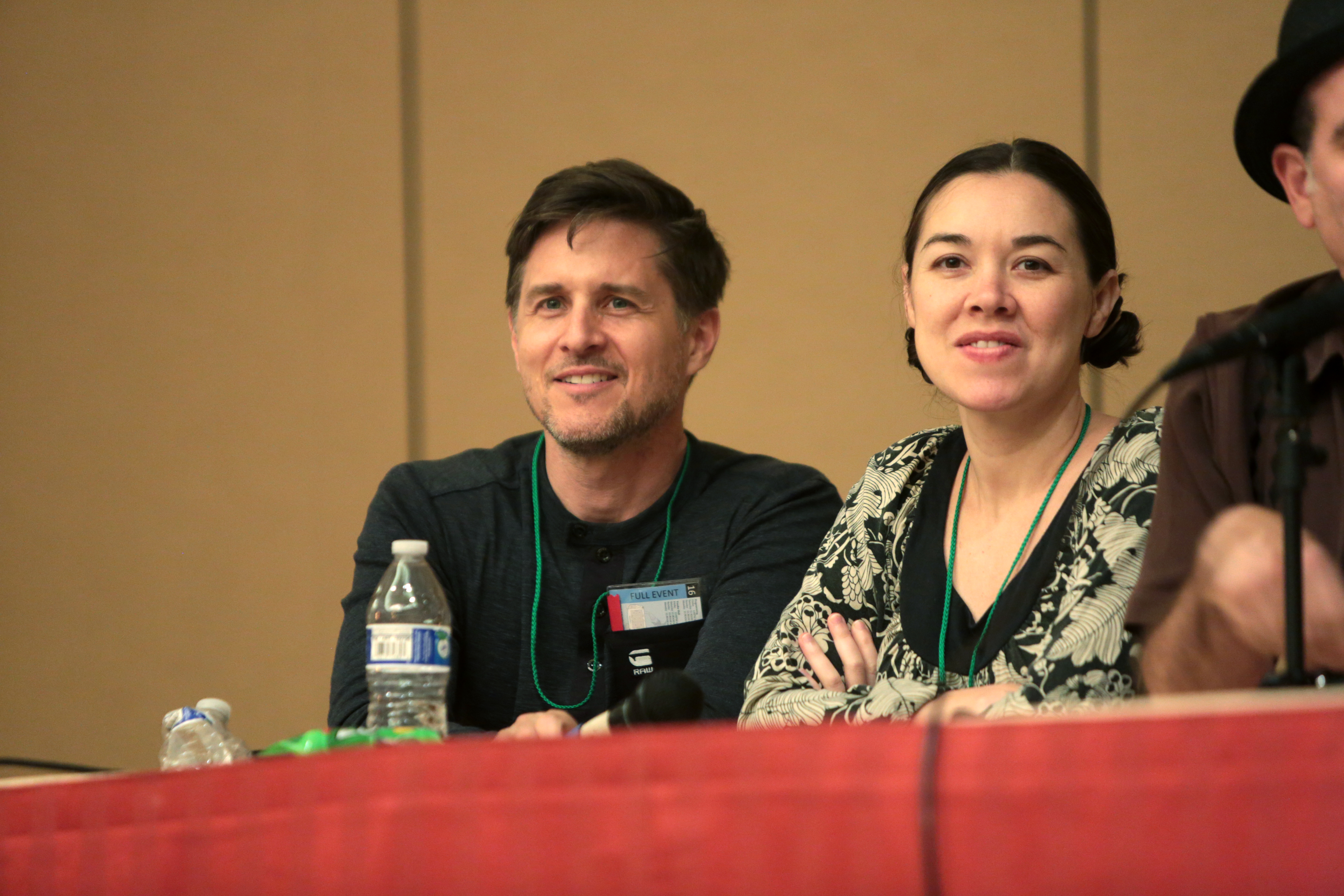
Lowenthal and his wife Tara Platt in 2016

Lowenthal met actress Tara Platt on an NYU grad film where they played opposite each other in a romantic comedy film called Model Chaser. Six months into their relationship, Lowenthal helped Platt do a cross-country move to Los Angeles so that Platt could participate in auditions there for new TV shows. He had originally planned to fly back after the move, but midway through the trip he proposed to her in Bowling Green, Ohio, and they married in Las Vegas in 2001. They founded a company called Monkey Kingdom Productions in 2004. Their son was born in 2016.

Lowenthal has described himself as a "Tennessee Jew".

== Books ==
- Lowenthal, Yuri; Platt, Tara (2010). Voice-Over Voice Actor: What It's Like Behind the Mic. Bug Bot Press. 259pp. ISBN 9780984074006. OCLC 429727108.
  - Lowenthal, Yuri; Platt, Tara (2018). Voice-Over Voice Actor: The Extended Edition. Bug Bot Press. 335pp. ISBN 9780984074051. LCCN 2017954792.
- Lowenthal, Yuri; Ikeda-Barry, Keith (2013). Tough City. Bug Bot Press. 117pp. ISBN 9780984074013. OCLC 849762751.

== Awards and nominations ==
Year	Award	Category	Nominated work	Result	Ref.
2019	D.I.C.E. Awards	Outstanding Achievement in Character	Marvel's Spider-Man	Nominated	
2024	British Academy Games Awards	Performer in a Leading Role	Marvel's Spider-Man 2	Nominated	
