= Seyitören, Damal =

Seyitören
- Village
- Location within Turkey
- Coordinates: 41.3881°N 42.8021°E
- Country: Turkey
- Province: Ardahan
- District: Damal
- Population (2021): 466
- Time zone: UTC+3 (TRT)

Seyitören is a village in the Damal District, Ardahan Province, Turkey. Its population is 466 (2021). The village is populated by Turkmens.
