= The Phoenix Incident =

- Theatrical release poster
- Directed by: Keith Arem
- Written by: Keith Arem
- Produced by: Keith Arem; Sarah J. Donohue; Fahad Enany; Adam Lawson; Ash Sarohia
- Starring: Yuri Lowenthal; Troy Baker; Travis Willingham; Liam O'Brien; Michael Adamthwaite; Jamie Tisdale; Brian Bloom
- Cinematography: Brandon Cox
- Edited by: Corey Brosius
- Music by: John Paesano
- Production company: PCB Productions
- Distributed by: Concourse Media (United States)
- Release dates: September 7, 2015 (United Kingdom); March 10, 2016 (limited)
- Running time: 82 minutes
- Country: United States
- Language: English
- Budget: $1.3 million

The Phoenix Incident is a 2016 American science fiction horror film written and directed by first time director Keith Arem, and starring Yuri Lowenthal, Troy Baker, Liam O'Brien, Michael Adamthwaite, Jamie Tisdale and Brian Bloom. Presented as a documentary found footage film based on real events, it is set in the present day and focuses upon an alleged conspiracy behind the Phoenix lights, a mass UFO sighting which occurred in Phoenix, Arizona, and Sonora, Mexico, on Thursday, March 13, 1997. On that date, lights of varying descriptions were reported by thousands of people between 19:30 and 22:30 MST in a space of about 300 miles (480 km) from the Nevada state line, through Phoenix, to the border of Tucson. The film focuses on the main events in and around Phoenix during this time.

== Plot ==
The Phoenix Incident begins with a night vision observation of a scorpion, followed by military firefight engagements in Damal, Turkey, Dayr Az Zawr, Syria and Mogadishu, Banadir, Somalia, during which alien cries are heard. Expository text states that, since 1997, the United States military has fought a covert war against "forces of unknown origin", with "57 incidents" spreading across Asia, Europe and Russia. NATO estimates that the alien invasion forces will reach populated areas within two years, with the conflict having begun in retaliation for an incident in Phoenix, Arizona, on March 13, 1997. The film is dedicated to "members of the intelligence community who provided evidence that made the film possible".

The film introduces the disappearance of four Arizona men. Heaven's Gate member Walton S. Gayson (Adamthwaite) is initially suspected of murdering them and is taken into federal custody. The search is later suspended after the men are declared victims of an bear attack, although the local medical examiner disputes this conclusion and is ordered to record it as their cause of death.

The documentary follows two interconnected plotlines. The first is an interview with an unidentified Air Force pilot, who risks the consequences of revealing what happened to the four men on the night of the Phoenix Lights. The second consists of recovered footage known as "The Lauder Tapes", filmed by Glenn Lauder (Lowenthal), Mitch Adams (Willingham), Ryan Stone (Baker) and Jacob Reynolds (O'Brien). Lauder combines several cameras, including one duct taped to his ATV helmet, providing most of the recovered footage.

The officer explains that the military detected a triangular object trailing the passing Hale-Bopp comet before it descended into Earth's atmosphere over Arizona. The object subsequently disappeared, while two KH satellites in the area ceased transmitting. The four men meanwhile travel to the foothills near the Sierra Estrella to ride their ATVs. Mitch, whose brother was a former US Marine, is particularly enthusiastic, while his friends are less interested. While preparing to leave, they notice increasing military activity, including helicopters, F-15 fighter jets and A-10's, alongside unusual atmospheric disturbances.

Ryan's truck breaks down in the foothills. While Jacob attempts repairs, the others look for Roadside assistance. They discover a desert compound enclosed by an electrified fence and owned by the reclusive Gayson, who angrily warns Jacob that they must leave immediately. The men nevertheless continue into the foothills on their ATVs.

The Air Force officer reveals that several "bogeys" entered Nevada's airspace before turning towards Phoenix. With civilians already witnessing the craft, Operation Snowbird begins, using decoy flares to distract the public while Air Force aircraft engage the unidentified craft in a dogfight over the Barry M. Goldwater Air Force Range.

The men witness the battle and see an alien craft crash into a nearby hill. Remembering his brother's death in a helicopter crash, Mitch attempts to rescue what he assumes is a human pilot. Before the military arrives, they are attacked by defensive creatures resembling man-sized scorpions, severely injuring Jacob. Their ATVs are destroyed, forcing them to seek refuge at Gayson's compound. Gayson, who has spent years awaiting abduction by the creatures so that he can ascend to a "higher plane" of existence, switches off the electric fence and allows them inside.

Jacob is abducted, while Mitch is torn apart as he tries to protect Ryan and Glenn. A military helicopter nearly rescues the survivors but is shot down by a UFO. Ryan distracts the creatures before being dragged away, while Glenn hides in a vehicle and eventually flees alone. Just as he appears to escape, an alien attacks him. His helmet falls off, and Glenn is killed outside the camcorder's view before the creature disappears and an alien spacecraft slowly departs. Gayson later discovers Glenn's helmet and recovers the camcorder's film.

In a post-credits scene, Gayson is revealed to have escaped prison shortly after his interview. Clean-shaven, he douses himself in petrol and sets himself alight, preparing to "rise above this world". The scene leads into the film's online viral campaign, which reveals how the Lauder Tapes were discovered.

== Cast ==
- Yuri Lowenthal as Glenn Lauder
  - Mason Joyce as Glenn (Age 4)
- Travis Willingham as Mitch Adams
- Troy Baker as Ryan Stone
- Liam O'Brien as Jacob Reynolds
- Michael Adamthwaite as Walton Samuel Gayson
- Brian Bloom as LAFB Pilot
- Jamie Tisdale as Melissa Henessey
- James Patrick Stuart as David Collins
- Fife Symington III as himself
- John McCain as himself
- Mark Withers as Bill Lauder
  - Karl Girolamo as Young Bill Lauder
- Deborah Geffner as Susan Lauder
  - Leah Stoltz as Young Susan Lauder
- Maria Bobeva as Sue Ellen Gayson
- Constance Broge as Michelle Stone
- Paul Thomas Arnold as Daniel Adams
- James Burns as Ken Adams
- Randy Hamilton as DMAF pilot
- Frances Barwood as herself
- Timothy Ley as himself
- Jamie Fauth as Carl Conner
- Matthew Godbey as Avondale Officer
- Ryan Keating as Lt. Col. James Edwards
- Holgie Forrester as Marsha Reynolds
- William Goldman as Dr. Robert Weissman, M.E.
- James Brewster as Major Jonathan Shapiro
- Elise Muller as Krissy Thompson
- Tony Prince as Rick Thompson
- Dan Willoughby as Cmdr Bryce Shepard
- Scot Ruggles as Lt. S. Jordan
- Mark McClain Wilson as Police 1
- Erika Elyse as Police 2
- Ron Ross as Henry Reynolds
- Brandon White as Mark Adams
- Mary Beth McDade as herself
- Rick Debruhl as himself
- Rebecca Grant as herself
- Tamara Henry as herself
- Rick Chambers as himself
- Cher Calvin as herself
- Craig Michaels as himself
- Tom McNamara as himself
- Marla Tellez as herself
- Micah Ohlman as himself
- Michael Watkiss as himself
- Valerie Arem as Operator
- Matthew Mercer as Pilot
- Paul Vinson as Tow Truck Driver
- Arif S. Kinchen as Eyewitness
- Jeff Boatman as Helicopter Pilot

== Production ==
Before production and release of the movie, Director Keith Arem, noted for his work in video games and graphic novels, began a four-year long transmedia marketing campaign, using twenty hidden websites, social media accounts, and blogs to drop "digital breadcrumbs" about a "vast military cover-up over the disappearance of four friends off-roading in the mountains near Phoenix after witnessing the U.S. military shoot down a UFO". This viral marketing campaign was so effective that the U.S. Department of Justice and Arizona military officials investigated the film makers, and many news media outlets such as The Mirror (a British tabloid), Yahoo News (a US-based news aggregator) and the Business Standard (an Indian English-language daily newspaper) reported the viral marketing campaign as real news events.

== Release ==
The Phoenix Incident was initially theatrically released with Fathom Events on March 10, 2016. An international version of the film was pre-released in the UK on September 7, 2015. The filmmakers partnered with gaming, UFO, and horror sites to promote the film's viral campaign, and released over 4 hours of additional content and story from the film. The film was awarded Best Feature at the Capital Cities Film Festival, Best Feature at the ICE Film Festival, and Vision Award at the Boston SciFi Film Festival. The movie was nominated for Best Horror at the Palm Beach Film Festival, and showcased at the BIFAN International Film Festival in South Korea. The film was featured at the 69th Roswell Festival in New Mexico. The film won Best Narrative Feature and Best Director at the Los Angeles Underground Film Festival.

The film makers utilized social media sites and sponsors, including Fathom Events, AMC, Hollywood Today, Regal, Fandango, Celestron, Shazam, and Lootcrate to distribute hidden content and supplemental clips from the motion picture and viral campaign. Director Keith Arem announced that an interactive/investigation version of the film as an iOS app would be released to contain all of the hidden content from the entire campaign. The Phoenix Interactive UFO Investigation App was released in July 2019 at San Diego Comic-Con. In January 2023, the film makers released “Phoenix Incident Festival Cut”, containing revised scenes and visual improvements. The film won Best Director at the 2023 Stanley Kubrick Awards, along with 49 other film festivals wins including Best Horror, Best Thriller, and Best First Time Film maker

== See also ==
- Found footage (film technique)
