= Catherine and Katherine =

Catherine characters

- Catherine characters
- First game: Catherine (2011)
- Created by: Katsura Hashino
- Designed by: Shigenori Soejima
- Voiced by: English: Catherine: Laura Bailey; Katherine: Michelle Ruff; Japanese: Catherine: Miyuki Sawashiro; Mamiko Noto, Ami Koshimizu, Aoi Yūki, Yui Horie, Kana Asumi, Haruka Tomatsu, Megumi Toyoguchi, Rie Kugimiya, Rina Satō, and Nana Mizuki (Catherine: Full Body); Katherine: Kotono Mitsuishi

Catherine (Note: Catherine has no surname) and Katherine McBride are a pair of characters in the 2011 video game Catherine. They are romantic rivals for protagonist Vincent Brooks; Katherine is Vincent's longtime childhood friend and fiancée, controlling, and desiring him to grow up, Catherine is a succubus demon and daughter of the Mesopotamian god Nergal who is less stable and threatens violence to herself or Vincent if he cheats. In the video game, Vincent ends up cheating with Catherine, and spends the game trying to figure out what to do while dealing with life-or-death nightmares. The characters were created by Katsura Hashino and designed by Shigenori Soejima.

Catherine and Katherine McBride have been the subject of analysis by multiple critics, including over which of the two is the superior choice as well as their role in dictating Vincent's actions.

== Appearances ==
Catherine and Katherine McBride first appear in the video game Catherine, serving as opposing love interests for protagonist Vincent Brooks. Katherine is Vincent's fiancée, who has grown irritated with Vincent's indecision with their future and inability to grow up. Vincent later meets Catherine in a bar, and wakes up in bed with her the next day. Throughout this, Vincent experiences life-or-death nightmares featuring various fears in his life, including a monstrous version of Katherine. The two women eventually discover that he's in a relationship with both of them; Catherine tries to kill Katherine, but is accidentally killed instead before returning as a giant monster. Katherine has no recollection of this and breaks up with Vincent. Vincent later learns that Catherine was a succubus created to trick men, Vincent included, to cheat. By the end of the story, depending on the choices made, Vincent can end up marrying Katherine, becoming a demon in the underworld with Catherine, or being single.

Downloadable costumes based on Catherine and Katherine McBride were made available in Persona 5 for Ann Takamaki and Makoto Niijima respectively.

== Concept and creation ==
Catherine and Katherine were both designed by Shigenori Soejima and created by Katsura Hashino. Catherine is a buxom blonde woman who wears white lingerie, while Katherine has long brownish hair with a black turtleneck sweater and black pants. Where Katherine is described as shrewish, controlling, and stable, Catherine is described as sexually provocative, childish, and unstable.

Catherine is portrayed in English and Japanese by Laura Bailey and Miyuki Sawashiro, while Katherine is portrayed in English and Japanese by Michelle Ruff and Kotono Mitsuishi, respectively. Both Bailey and Ruff were given their roles after having worked with Atlus previously and being approached with these roles. On portraying Catherine, Bailey stated that voicing scenes with Vincent was awkward at times due to viewing Vincent's actor, Troy Baker, as a brother. When portraying Katherine, Ruff aimed to provide a more natural delivery and make Katherine feel real. When recording the fight between Catherine and Katherine, voice director Valerie Arem stated that a lot of this dialogue was improvised.

== Reception ==
In a poll by Deep Silver of who European respondents would pick between Catherine and Katherine, Katherine won by 59 percent. Destructoid writer Charlotte Cutts noted that on her second playthrough, she felt herself liking Catherine more and Katherine less, noting that Katherine being a "flawed human" made it easier for her to be resented than Catherine, who is "relatively straightforward" and is a certain way due to her origins. She says that Katherine comes off as an "unsympathetic nag," saying that Katherine seems to force Vincent into conforming into what people their age should be doing. She discussed the perspective that Katherine seemed to care about getting married more than marrying Vincent, citing how she keeps him out of decisions about the marriage, though noted that Vincent's ineptitude may justify her not including him. She also touched upon the idea that Katherine and Catherine portray a tsundere/yandere relationship, suggesting that it goes against this by Katherine having some yandere traits as well.

GamesRadar writer Kimberley Ballard discussed the tendency of some reviewers to identify Katherine as the "typical nagging girlfriend," suggesting that the reviewers being male may have influenced their criticisms of Katherine. She also criticized the game for making Katherine and Catherine too basic of female stereotypes; she discussed how Katherine was "the girlfriend we all fear," citing her cold gaze and her being "beautiful but frightening." She described Katherine's portrayal as not being a woman, but a "responsibility, and it’s not too hard to see that with a serious relationship comes death." She also discussed the tendency of the game's marketing to depict Catherine in a way that appeals to the male gaze, with focus on her in suggestive positions and focus placed on her breasts. Ballard described this as giving the game an "oily sheen of sleaze." PCGamer writer Mollie Taylor discussed how she pursued repairing the relationship between Katherine and Vincent due in part to her desire to play what she considered the "goody-two-shoes" route, stating that it seemed like the obvious decision to want to fix a relationship with someone who "actually gives a crap" about Vincent. She questioned, however, what it would have been like to go down Catherine's path, stating that she may have been among her favorite in-game relationships she has had.

Game designer Emily Short found Katherine both sympathetic and infuriating, stating that while she believed that Vincent was not worth her time and that she should dump him, she found her bossy, unable to let Vincent be an adult and instead treating him like a child. She found herself identifying with Katherine the most of the cast. On the respective endings, Short found marrying Katherine as Vincent disappointing, believing that this reflected him bending to her whims, while the marriage with Catherine was seemingly just as constrained. Writer Katherine Cross believed both women served as an "abstraction with a face" rather than an individual woman, describing Katherine as the "maternal nag that threatens to consume all male autonomy" and Catherine as the "sexy ideal who promises eternal fun". She believed that they were symbols to Vincent, just as the nightmares Vincent is trying to survive.

Destructoid writer Charlotte Cutts stated that, on her first playthrough of Catherine, she did not like either women much. She described Catherine as a "creepy stalker/scorned mistress turned up to deafening levels", though on a second playthrough, she found herself sympathizing with her despite viewing her as the "evil" character between the two, citing how her motives are clear and straightforward, and her evil nature is due to her origin rather than any decision she made. Meanwhile, she argued that Katherine was easy to dislike due to her being a "flawed human". She said that, depending on the point of view, Katherine is either a woman nagging Vincent to grow up, or she is being reasonable to try to steer her relationship where it reasonably should arrive. She personally found her unsympathetic regardless of how legitimate her concerns may be. Meanwhile, she argues that since Catherine is a succubus, it's actively difficult for her to leave Vincent alone. Hardcore Gaming 101 writer Brian Crimmins felt that the game did not adequately explain why Katherine was with Vincent in the first place, stating that she seems as flawed as Vincent if not more so. He felt that her ambition came off as either "an impersonal, almost business-like desire for control or as an inexplicable force of anger and reprimand for Vincent to deal with".

Kotaku writer Leigh Alexander felt that all of the game's characters, Catherine and Katherine included, were "despicable", calling Catherine "clueless, manipulative" and Katherine "judgmental, shrewish and unforgiving". She stated that she felt a little sorry for Catherine despite her being "temptation incarnate, home-wrecker incarnate". In their review of Catherine: Full Body, writer Caty McCarthy praised it for making the draw of both women more compelling than the original game, singling out Katherine for being more fleshed out. She felt that the addition of scenes showing Katherine and Vincent in the past helped make the guilt of cheating on her seem more apparent. Kotaku writer Natalie Degraffiinried agreed, stating that the glimpse into their past made her feel less of a shrew. They also praised the new ending for Katherine where she leaves Vincent, stating that they found it refreshing. Author Daniel Sipocz argued that the framing of Vincent's relationship with the two women could be interpreted as the sexual liberation of women being harmful to men, believing the game to be presenting their sexuality as being why Vincent cheated. He argued that Katherine had desirable traits like romantic stability and a well-paying job, but comes off as nonsexual, never showing physical or verbal affection to Vincent. In contrast, Catherine lacks that stability, being "spontaneous and hypersexual." Sipocz felt that Catherine was not a separate woman from Katherine, but an ideal version—the "sexy" version.
