= The Arcadian =

- Directed by: Dekker Dreyer
- Written by: Dekker Dreyer; Sean Jaffe; Yuri Lowenthal
- Produced by: Julia Hiroko Howe; Dekker Dreyer; Rob Gorden
- Starring: J. LaRose; Deshja Driggs-Hall; Adam Sessler; Sab Shimono; Bill Cobbs; Lance Henriksen; Brian Thompson; Yuri Lowenthal
- Cinematography: Dekker Dreyer; Ryan Guzdzial; Clint Hudson
- Production company: Fringe Majority
- Release dates: April 28, 2011 (Sci-Fi-London); December 12, 2016 (U.S.)
- Country: United States
- Language: English

The Arcadian is a 2011 American science fiction feature film set in a post-apocalyptic world. Official press releases stated, "The Arcadian" follows “The Lighthouse Keeper” on a story of revenge and redemption in a strange future world reminiscent of wild 1970s pop sci-fi. The visual world of The Arcadian is an homage to the work of underground illustrators while creating something that is both unique and distinct.

== Cast ==
- J. LaRose as The Lighthouse Keeper
- Deshja Driggs-Hall as Astrid
- Sab Shimono as Moto
- Bill Cobbs as Charles
- Lance Henriksen as Father Reed
- Yuri Lowenthal as Kraken
- Tara Platt as Tempest
- Brian Thompson as Agmundr
- Adam Sessler as Marco
- Bonnie Morgan as Agmundr's Sculpture
- Rob Gorden as Erik
- Boris Kievsky as Anchor

== Release ==
No release date has been specified. Principal photography ceased in November 2009 and post-production was scheduled to be completed in the spring of 2010. It was released on April 28, 2011 in the United Kingdom.

== Production ==
Production on the Arcadian took place across the United States and Canada, notably several areas of the coast in Nova Scotia were used for background plates and set pieces. Second unit production involved local area crews.

Additionally, the film was shot entirely on a Canon EOS 5D Mark II camera.
