= Burmadere, Damal =

Burmadere
- Village
- Location within Turkey
- Coordinates: 41°18′N 42°47′E
- Country: Turkey
- Province: Ardahan
- District: Damal
- Population (2021): 599
- Time zone: UTC+3 (TRT)

Burmadere is a village in the Damal District, Ardahan Province, Turkey. Its population is 599 (2021). The village is populated by Turkmens.
