= Erica Anderson (Catherine) =

Fictional character from the 2011 video game Catherine

- Erica Anderson, as depicted in promotional art for Catherine
- First game: Catherine (2011)
- Voiced by: EN: Erin Fitzgerald; JA: Junko Minagawa

Erica Anderson is a fictional character in the 2011 video game Catherine. She is a transgender woman, and her portrayal was considered controversial by Western audiences. She is a confidant to the protagonist, Vincent Brooks, working for the Stray Sheep bar, who, like her, suffers from potentially fatal nightmares. She is portrayed by Erin Fitzgerald in English and Junko Minagawa in Japanese.

Erica received mixed reception; her treatment in Catherine and Catherine: Full Body as a trans woman was generally negative by the games and their characters, including the first game deadnaming her. One particular criticism was over Full Body, where in one ending, she is shown to not undergo gender transition, though as one critic noted, she may still intend to do so.

== Concept and creation ==
Erica's features are generally feminine, but her eyes bear resemblance more to game's male characters'. She exhibits dominant body language as well as body language that demonstrates sexual confidence. Characters react with disgust to the idea of one character having sex with her and she is referred to by her deadname at multiple points, both in-universe and in the game's credits. Erica is also subject to nightmares that are said to only affect men. She is portrayed by Erin Fitzgerald in English and Junko Minagawa in Japanese.

== Appearances ==
Erica first appears in the video game Catherine, where she is a waitress of the Stray Sheep bar. She frequently engages with a group of her childhood friends, including protagonist Vincent Brooks. One member, someone who is younger than her and not a childhood friend of hers, develops a crush on her. She chats with them about various gossip and rumors, including one about a witch in town or discussions about women's professional wrestling. This story turns out to be about her, including incidents from their childhood. She eventually engages in a relationship with Toby, causing her to be subject to the same potentially fatal nightmares that affect Vincent and other men. Erica eventually becomes aware of the true nature of her manager, known as Boss or Thomas Mutton, who was actually a Mesopotamian god named Dumuzid, and was responsible for these dangerous nightmares. He explained that these nightmares were given to people who are wasting the reproductive value of their partners. In one ending, Erica is shown to have had sex with Toby, who regrets it due to finding out that she is a trans woman. In Catherine: Full Body, she has some interactions with new major character Rin. In one ending, Erica has not yet transitioned, and in another ending, she is revealed to be training to become a professional wrestler. In a side mode of Catherine: Full Body as a playable character.

A downloadable costume based on Erica was made available in Persona 5 for Haru Okumura, one of its playable characters.

== Reception ==
Since appearing in Catherine, Erica has received a widely mixed reception, with some praising her personality and presentation with others criticizing other character's attitudes towards her. Writer Matt Kim suggested that her coming out scene was used to embarrass Toby, who had sex with her. Writer Mattie Brice was critical of Erica, calling her an "extremely problematic character." She felt that the hints that exist of her gender, when viewed in hindsight, come off as malicious. She particularly cites characters' aversion to her and disparaging of her femininity. She felt however that her actual character is great and relatable, but the way she is framed in the game "doesn’t provide any optimism for trans-folk and their allies." The Guardian's Matt Kamen agreed on the hints, stating that the game "[reflects] the real fears and stigmas trans people face." Writer Bella Blondeau writes in TheGamer that much of the reaction to Erica is "based in blind anger and a seemingly deliberate misconstruing of the game’s intent, messaging and morality." She notes that Erica is a refreshing character, passing perfectly, and not letting herself be defined by her trauma.

Writer Ana Valens cites a scene in the Full Body edition of the game where Erica does not transition, in the Catherine ending. She suggests that this implies that not transitioning is better for her. However, Toby looks on at Catherine and Vincent and reflects on how he wishes he had an "angel" like her, to which Erica replies "they may be closer than you think", implying she intends to transition. Writer Caty McCarthy felt that Erica came off as well-rounded until her coming out was treated like a joke. Writer Sam Greer agreed that she felt like her status as a trans woman is treated like a joke. GamesRadar's Kimberley Ballard criticized Erica as a "fetish" character. Writer Astrid Johnson felt that Atlus was "hamfisted" with how they wrote Erica and felt that she was oversexualized, but was overall pleased with her character, citing her steadfast and distinct personality. However, she was critical of the fact that she received dreams that only men received, claiming it suggests that she is actually a man. Writer Carol Grant was similarly put off by this plot, also criticizing a line where Toby claims that the sex he had with Erica felt "weird." She suggests that this is a part of a greater problem with Catherine, which she claims features characters who fit gender types, such as one woman being the "nagging shrew" archetype. A Nightmare Mode writer felt that the nightmare plot point was a punishment by the game's antagonist for Erica having sex with Toby, which they compare to real-life violence trans people experience in similar situations.

Japanese audiences received Erica more positively. Other writers were more receptive to Erica. Writer Charlotte Cutts was pleased with her character and personality, but disappointed with Atlus' handling of her trans status. Writer Pixie the Fairy, in an article on Destructoid, was more positive on the character. They noted that the other characters did not choose to out her as transgender, and praised the portrayal for its positive effects on people who are yet to come out. A fellow Destructoid writer, Ben Davis, felt that Erica was handled respectfully, and that while Toby is surprised by this, describes his reaction as joking in a friendly way. Advocate listed Erica in their list of the best LGBT characters in video games. Writer Kazuma Hashimoto discussed Erica in the context of Japanese trans people. He discusses the nightmare plot, showing her in the dream world expressing distress that she cannot birth children. He notes that this comes off as transphobic to global audiences but touches upon a "deeply Japanese" issue with outdated laws which require that trans people undergo gender-affirming surgery if they transition. He also discusses a culture that views womanhood as having the ability to give birth. As such, he claims that this harms Erica's ability to be perceived as a woman. He also discusses how her deadnaming may reflect the fact past and present laws that prevent unmarried trans people from changing their names. He discusses how her treatment in-game is reflective of transphobia and sexism in Japanese media, while noting that cultural differences may result in a character being received differently in one country than the other.
