= Tepeköy, Damal =

Tepeköy
- Village
- Location within Turkey
- Coordinates: 41.3475°N 42.8074°E
- Country: Turkey
- Province: Ardahan
- District: Damal
- Population (2021): 87
- Time zone: UTC+3 (TRT)

Tepeköy is a village in the Damal District, Ardahan Province, Turkey. Its population is 87 (2021). The village is populated by Turkmens.
