= İkizdere, Damal =

İkizdere
- Village
- Location in Turkey
- Coordinates: 41.3385°N 42.9044°E
- Country: Turkey
- Province: Ardahan
- District: Damal
- Population (2021): 104
- Time zone: UTC+3 (TRT)

İkizdere is a village in the Damal District, Ardahan Province, Turkey. Its population is 104 (2021).
