= Damal =

Town in Ardahan Province, Turkey

- Municipality
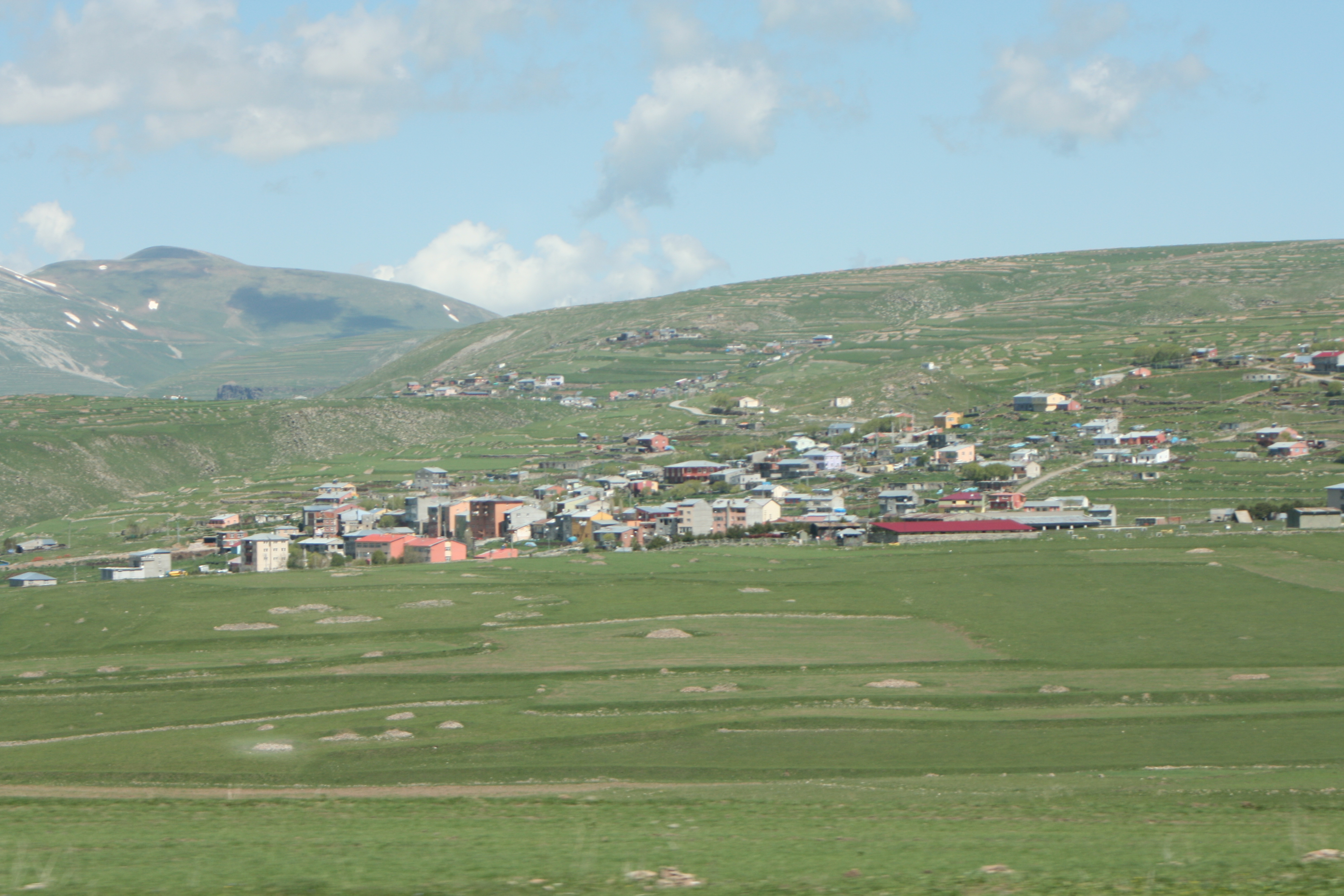

- Location within Turkey
- Coordinates: 41°20′30″N 42°50′30″E
- Country: Turkey
- Province: Ardahan
- District: Damal

Government
  - Mayor: Kemal Çamliyurt (Ind.)
- Population (2021): 2,890
- Time zone: UTC+3 (TRT)
- Postal code: 75600
- Website: www.damal.bel.tr

Damal, formerly Petereke, is a town in Ardahan Province of Turkey, on the road from Kars to Posof. It is the seat of Damal District. Its population is 2,890 (2021). It consists of 8 quarters, including İnönü. The town is populated by Turkmens.
