= Damal District =

District of Ardahan Province, Turkey

- District
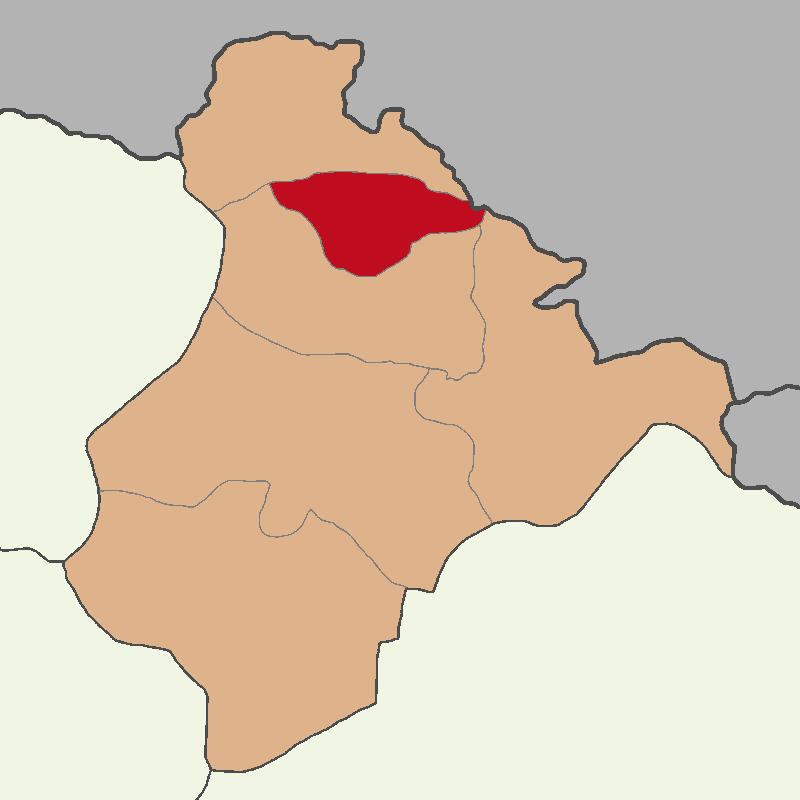
- Map showing Damal District in Ardahan Province

- Location in Turkey
- Coordinates: 41°21′N 42°51′E
- Country: Turkey
- Province: Ardahan
- Seat: Damal

Government
  - Kaymakam: Semih Cembekli
- Area: 165 km^{2} (64 sq mi)
- Population (2021): 5,127
  - Density: 31.1/km^{2} (80.5/sq mi)
- Time zone: UTC+3 (TRT)
- Website: www.damal.gov.tr

Damal District is a district of Ardahan Province of Turkey. Its seat is the town Damal. Its area is 165 km^{2}, and its population in 2021 was 5,127.

The district is populated by Alevi Turkmens.

== Composition ==
There is one municipality in Damal District:

- Damal

There are 7 villages in Damal District:

- Burmadere
- Dereköy
- Eskikılıç
- İkizdere
- Otağlı
- Seyitören
- Tepeköy
