= Otağlı, Damal =

Otağlı
- Village
- Location within Turkey
- Coordinates: 41°21′N 42°48′E
- Country: Turkey
- Province: Ardahan
- District: Damal
- Population (2021): 384
- Time zone: UTC+3 (TRT)

Otağlı is a village in the Damal District, Ardahan Province, Turkey. Its population is 384 (2021). The village is populated by Turkmens.
