= Dekker Dreyer =

American filmmaker, artist, and composer

- Dekker Dreyer and wife Julia Howe at the 2016 Primetime Emmy Awards
- Born: Ryan Dekker Dreyer; November 16, 1980 (age 45); Daytona Beach, Florida, U.S.
- Other name: Phantom Astronaut
- Occupations: Artist, director, composer, writer
- Spouse: Julia Howe

Dekker Dreyer (born November 16, 1980) is an American avant-garde artist and cultural figure whose pioneering work spans film, immersive media, music, television, publishing, and conceptual art who often creates under the pseudonym Phantom Astronaut.

== Artistry ==
Dreyer works in a variety of mediums with themes intersecting around the subconscious, folklore, technology, and criticism of social systems. His work can be broadly categorized as surreal and often Fantastique. Dreyer employs numerous mediums with his work broadly categorized as conceptual art.

=== Films ===
Dekker's first film Closed Circuit, was commissioned by Miramax to accompany the feature Naqoyqatsi, was shown at the 2002 Slamdance Film Festival. This was followed by several experimental films. His first mid-length project The Arcadian, depicts a fascist post-apocalyptic world through a pop art lens, starring Lance Henriksen with the music of Perturbator which was released on collector's edition VHS alongside international midnight screenings.

In music videos, his directorial output includes Mystery Skulls official music video for the single Music and Snowblood's "I'm Ready". He collaborated again with Mystery Skulls in 2022 to create holographic visuals for the "Beam Me Up" Tour.

Dreyer has spoken at events such as The Cannes Film Festival and Sundance.

=== Music ===
Dreyer is known musically as Phantom Astronaut.

Phantom Astronaut's Gravity + Time (2020) explores genetic history and his Forbidden Science of the Western States Album (2021) explores atomic-age paranoia through environmental samples.

Dreyer works with Danish American ambient and Nordic folk musician The Seawolf and appears on his EP Ginnungagap.

=== Fiction writing ===
Dreyer's literary work includes authoring the short story anthologies, Cyberpunk is Dead: Long Live Cyberpunk, Dark Astronomy, Body Horrors, Demonology Lessons, and the novella The Tea Goddess. He is credited as having coined the term ecopunk in 2010, being one of the first authors in the genre which is now widely accepted as Solarpunk. In comics, Dekker is a writer and illustrator, His work includes Mondo Atomic, which retells the stories of Plan 9 from Outer Space, Robot Monster, and other B movies in a contemporary way.

His comic anthology Seven Deadly Sins critiques the role of technology in modern society.

In 2022 he launched a TikTok account dedicated to short fiction which attracted over ten million views and over one hundred thousand followers in the first month.

=== Virtual and augmented reality ===
Dreyer has been called a VR pioneer by both Entrepreneur and MovieMaker. He is considered a prominent artist in immersive media. At the studio he co-founded, Clever Fox, he created and directed two of the first scripted original series in VR, The Depths and Broadcast. He has also created XR experiences for musical artists Bootsy Collins, Devo and Disturbed.

His augmented reality live experience The Summoning has been called a "First of its kind" by UploadVR and received wide recognition for its innovative use of technology and creativity. Subsequent projects include the collaborative storytelling project What We Leave Behind.

Dreyer created the VR / AR Producing course at Columbia College Chicago and was subject matter expert for immersive media at the University of Maryland

=== Visual, Experimental, and Performance Art ===
Dreyer's visual art projects range in format and style. In 2009 a series of digital works were showcased as part of media company Gawker's contemporary art registry. In 2011 he contributed to the Make Your Franklin project. His work has been included in numerous pop-culture themed shows in Los Angeles.

His experiential and performance art projects combine immersive theatricality, and absurdist cultural commentary. These projects include the restaurant Kaiju Sushi which was located in the shark attack capital of the world. Dreyer and his partner Julia Howe proclaimed that any person coming to the pop-up restaurant with proof that they were attacked by sharks would get free sushi resulting in national coverage and raised awareness for ecological conservation. His second cuisine-based art experience was L'Aldila, a supernatural restaurant in the heart of Spiritualist camp Cassadaga, Florida, where patrons were encouraged to commune with the dead during their meals.

Dreyer's A.I. generated works include the series Sacred + Profane presented as part of the exhibit A Kind of Alchemy by the International Journal for Digital Art History and the Phantom Astronaut Dead Channel on Twitch. The Dead Channel is described as a neural network trained on Dreyer's voice speaking words and phrases written by Dreyer randomly reassembled as a twenty-four hour live feed with stylized found footage.

Dreyer's most controversial experimental work is the project Tentacle Grape, produced in partnership with his wife, to bring awareness to a rising tide of misogyny in pop culture in an era predating Gamergate and related right-wing movements. The project, presented as a regular consumer product, created confusion and drew controversy about the brand's packaging and message. Although controversial, the product was overwhelmingly popular leading to Cracked naming it #4 on their list of "Horrifying Soft Drinks Around the World". The unexpected popularity of the product lead to a backlog prompting watchdog site The Consumerist to question the existence of the soda. A retraction was subsequently published.

== Curation, Producing, and Hosting ==
In 2007 he and his partners launched the Illusion On-Demand network, a science fiction television channel geared toward supporting independent genre filmmakers. At launch the network boasted a large footprint within the US cable television market. He soon took on the duty of creative director and brought both anime and sci-fi classics like Doctor Who to the network. Dekker produced many of the original programs that appeared on Illusion including Analog presents: The Science of Fiction in partnership with Analog Science Fiction and Fact. He would later expand the channel's holdings by launching the short-lived anthology magazine Transmitter

In 2008 he founded the touring animation festival Anime After Dark which kicked off with presenting the official 20th anniversary event for Grave of the Fireflies showcasing a digital conversion which was overseen by Dreyer.

From 2012 to 2016 he was part of Participant Media's online video arm at Takepart.com and on the launch team for their cable television network Pivot. Participant Media is widely known to produce content dealing with the subjects of climate change, journalistic ethics, and social justice.

In 2016 he returned to the Slamdance Film Festival as a jury member. That same year he was a major supporter of the organization's DIG (Digital, Interactive, and Gaming) showcase. In 2018 he took on the role of organizer and co-curator of the DIG program.

Dreyer produced a live event series called Movie Cult in Los Angeles which encourages audience participation around forgotten VHS movies and other pop culture found footage.

From 2017 to 2018 Dreyer was the co-host of the podcast The Future is Virtual from Embolden Entertainment (later Zero Gravity). The show was unique in that it was live streamed as a simulcast to AltspaceVR, Twitch, and Facebook 360. In 2015 Dreyer was featured on TV Tokyo's television series Why Did You Come to Japan. He and his wife Julia took the audience on a tour of Tokyo's Golden Gai nightlife.

== Non-Fiction Projects ==
Dreyer is an outspoken essayist writing on the topics of human rights, race, sexual identity, and other social issues from a perspective left of center in U.S. politics.

Other non-fiction projects include producing the free-form documentary Three Days in Orlando which showcased the social climate around the yearly Gay Days event in Orlando Florida through a series of intimate vérité vignettes

== Personal life ==
Dreyer was born on November 16, 1980, in Daytona Beach, Florida. His parents briefly performed traveling puppet shows with the family living out of the show's tour van. He spent longer periods living in New York City, California, Massachusetts, and Central Florida. As a teenager he attended Douglas Anderson School of the Arts. Dreyer claims that due to living over a hundred miles outside of the local area his parents maintained a local apartment for him and that he would travel home each weekend.

He Married his spouse, composer and FX engineer, Julia Howe, in 2009
