= List of Persona 4: The Animation episodes =

- Season 4
- Cover of the first Blu-ray volume released by Aniplex on November 23, 2011, featuring main protagonist Yu Narukami.
- No. of episodes: 26

Release
- Original network: MBS
- Original release: October 6, 2011 – March 30, 2012

Season chronology
- Next → Persona4 the Golden ANIMATION

Persona 4: The Animation, stylized as Persona4 the ANIMATION, is an anime television series based on the Persona 4 video game by Atlus. Produced by AIC A.S.T.A. and directed by Seiji Kishi, the series revolves around Yu Narukami, a second year high school student from a city who moves to Inaba to live for a year with his uncle and cousin. After acquiring a mysterious power called "Persona", he embarks on a journey with his new friends to uncover the truth behind a bizarre series of murders involving the distorted TV World, as well as a phenomenon called the "Midnight Channel". The 25-episodes series aired on MBS between October 6, 2011, and March 29, 2012. An additional 26th episode, featuring the story's true ending, was released on the 10th DVD/BD volume on August 22, 2013. Sentai Filmworks licensed the series in North America, simulcasting it on Anime Network as it aired and releasing the series on DVD and Blu-ray in two collective volumes on September 18, 2012, and January 15, 2013, respectively. A film recap of the series, titled Persona 4: The Animation -The Factor of Hope-, was released in Japanese theaters on June 9, 2012, featuring a condensed version of the story and new scenes of animation.

The main opening themes for the series are "sky's the limit" by Shihoko Hirata for episodes 1–8, 10–12, and "key plus words" sung by Hirata featuring Yumi Kawamura for episodes 13–14, 16–22. Additional opening themes include "Pursuing My True Self", the opening theme of Persona 4, by Hirata for the TV broadcast of the first episode, "True Story" by Rise Kujikawa (Rie Kugimiya) for episode 9, and "Burn My Dread", the opening theme of Persona 3, by Kawamura for episode 15. The main ending themes for the series are "Beauty of Destiny" by Hirata featuring Lotus Juice for episodes 1–12, and "The Way of Memories -Kizuna no Chikara-" (The Way of Memories -キズナノチカラ-; lit. 'The Way of Memories -The Power of Bonds-') by Hirata for episodes 14–17, 19–21, 23. Additional ending themes include "Koisuru Meitantei" (恋する名探偵; lit. 'The Love Detective') by Loveline (Yui Horie) for episode 13, "Honto no Kimochi" (ほんとのきもち; lit. 'True Feelings') by Hirata for episode 18, and "Never More", the ending theme of Persona 4, by Hirata for episode 25 and the True End episode.

== Episode list ==
No.	Title	Written by	Original release date
1	"You're myself, I'm yourself"	Yūko Kakihara	October 7, 2011
Inside a limousine, Igor and his assistant Margaret introduce themselves to the unseen visitor and explain the nature of their location, the Velvet Room, a place that exists between "dream and reality." Igor mentions something special is in store for their guest. On April 11, 2011, Yu Narukami arrives by train to the rural city of Inaba, where he will be living with his detective uncle and cousin for a year due to his parents working overseas, beginning classes at Yasogami High School the following day. While truant from school, someone discovers the corpse of television announcer Mayumi Yamano hanging from a television aerial, where a crime scene is set up. Yu meets and goes out with Yosuke Hanamura and Chie Satonaka to Junes, a department store where Yosuke works and whose father manages. After Yosuke offered to treat Yu for getting him out of a trash can, Chie demanded to tag along in compensation for her broken DVD. Chie brings up the Midnight Channel, a strange "television show" that appears on rainy nights. The three later meet Saki Konishi (a girl Yosuke has a crush on) there as well. Back at home, an interview is shown on the news about a girl who had witnessed the murder. As it later rains during the night, Yu feels a strange ambiance as it tries to pull him into the television, but he manages to free himself. Although relaying this event to Chie and Yosuke the next day yet dismissing it as a dream, they head to Junes to see what will happen on a widescreen television. The news shows that Saki was actually the one being interviewed, and as Yu touches the television, he starts to pass through. Out of shock, Yosuke accidentally knocks the three of them into the television, where they enter a world shrouded by fog. They find a room with a noose and encounter an anthropomorphic bear named Teddie, who hands Yu a pair of glasses, allowing him to see through the fog. Suddenly, they are attacked by creatures known as Shadows. As the group is pinned down, Yu's power awakens, and he summons his Persona, Izanagi, to defeat the Shadows.
2	"The Contractor's key"	Yūko Kakihara	October 14, 2011
In the Velvet Room, Igor and Margaret present a key to their guest, welcoming him to return whenever he wishes. Margaret also reveals the guest's Persona is a Wild Card, providing infinite possibilities. Thanks to Teddie, Yu, Yosuke, and Chie return to their world. The next day, Chie's best friend, Yukiko Amagi, rejects a disturbed student's request for a date. Yosuke wants to take Saki to see a movie, but an assembly is called in, where it is learned that she has died. Yosuke proposes a theory that not only people who appear on the Midnight Channel will die, but also the television world is somehow connected to their deaths. Yu and Yosuke return to the television world, leaving Chie behind. Teddie accuses Yu and Yosuke of pushing people in, leading to their deaths. After discovering that his body is hollow, they manage to convince him otherwise and offer to help find the culprit. Teddie leads them to the twisted shopping district, mirroring the Inaba Shopping District, where they find the Konishi family's liquor store. Inside, Yosuke hears Saki's suppressed thoughts about her hatred towards him and his association with Junes. Suddenly, a doppelgänger of Yosuke appears, claiming to be the manifestation of his boredom with the countryside, being a transfer student himself. Yosuke denies these claims, causing the doppelgänger to turn into a Shadow. During the battle, Yu makes Yosuke accept his Shadow's thoughts, allowing Izanagi to defeat it and transform into Yosuke's Persona, Jiraiya. Yu and Yosuke return to their world, finding a worried Chie waiting for them. As they return home, Yu and Yosuke resolve to uncover the culprit.
3	"We are friends, aren't we?"	Mitsutaka Hirota	October 21, 2011
In the Velvet Room, Igor explains that Personas are strengthened by the bonds one makes with others, and Margaret notes that their guest has formed the bond necessary for the Magician Arcana so far. Chie grows concerned after seeing Yukiko on the Midnight Channel but is assuaged when Yukiko calls her to say she is taking time off from school to help at the Amagi Inn, the inn owned by her family. After confirming with Teddie that no humans are currently inside the TV world, Yu suggests that they watch Midnight Channel at night, which shows Yukiko dressed as a princess, proclaiming that she is searching for her "Prince Charming" before running off into a castle. The next day, Yosuke reveals two fake swords he found, believing they will help in the television world, but both he and Yu are arrested when an officer mistakes them for real swords. At the station, Tohru Adachi, a junior detective partnered with Dojima, releases the boys. Chie meets them there and reveals that Yukiko has gone missing, prompting Adachi to believe that Yukiko may be involved with the recent murders. Yu, Yosuke, and Chie later go into the television world, meeting up with Teddie to save Yukiko inside the castle. Chie runs in ahead of the others, entering a room resembling a bedroom where she hears Yukiko's thoughts about being useless without Chie. During this, Chie's other self appears, scoffing at Yukiko and liking how she submits. When Chie rejects these accusations, her other self transforms into a Shadow that the boys fight, with Yu discovering his ability to use other Personas in battle. After the battle, Chie accepts that the only thing she cares about is Yukiko's friendship, causing the Shadow to transform into her Persona, Tomoe Gozen. The group leaves the television world, unable to find Yukiko, but vows to rescue her before the fog returns.
4	"Somewhere not here"	Jun Kumagai	October 28, 2011
In the Velvet Room, Margaret congratulates their guest on their ability to utilize the powers of the Wild Card and that he has managed to obtain yet another bond to create the Chariot Arcana. The group returns to the television world to resume their search for Yukiko in the castle, but they instead find her doppelgänger, who, after summoning Shadows, runs off. Elsewhere, the real Yukiko reminisces about the time she befriended Chie, followed by the time she nursed an abandoned baby bird back to health and then kept as a pet. When it escaped its cage after she forgot to lock the door, Yukiko became overcome with thoughts that, unlike the bird, she would be unable to escape her fate of running the Amagi Inn. When her friends find her, they see her doppelgänger voicing these thoughts aloud to Yukiko. The doppelganger welcomes the group before attempting to drop a chandelier on top of Chie. However, Yu reveals another ability, allowing him to summon Ara Mitama to protect her. The doppelgänger then rants about how Chie is no longer fit to be her prince and continues attacking them. Eventually, Yukiko rejects her, causing the doppelgänger to transform into a Shadow, a bird that sets the area ablaze while trapping the real Yukiko in a birdcage. As the group fights Yukiko's Shadow, Chie reveals her jealousy towards Yukiko, giving Yukiko the strength to break free and allowing the others to defeat her Shadow. After the battle, Yukiko accepts her Shadow, becoming her Persona, Konohana-Sakuya.
5	"Would you love me?"	Yūko Kakihara	November 4, 2011
In the Velvet Room, Margaret foretells that their guest will soon acquire two new Arcanas: the Moon and Strength. While waiting for Yukiko to recover, Yu is asked by Chie to help out with the basketball club, being formally introduced to his teammate, Kou Ichijo. He later spends time with the team's manager, Ai Ebihara, who eventually confides in him about a crush she has on Kou and asks for help; however, upon learning that Kou has a crush on Chie, a devastated Ai attempts to jump off of the school roof. Yu manages to console her, which causes Ai to force Yu into dating her until she finds someone else. Believing that Chie might be jealous of Yu, Yosuke sets her up to become a temporary manager for the basketball team. Yu later learns that Kou is quitting the team after the next game because of family pressure and wants to leave on a win. During the game, Ai starts a slap-fight with Chie due to her jealousy, and Kou's team ends up losing. Later, while eating at the Chinese Diner Aiya, Yosuke notices that his classmate Aika Nakamura works there because her family owns the restaurant. Kou explains that the outcome changed his mind about quitting, and Ai lets go of Yu, explaining that she wants to work hard and become a good manager. The next day, a fully recovered Yukiko returns to school and asks to join their investigation, which they accept.
6	"I'll beat you, and beat you good"	Jun Kumagai	November 11, 2011
In the Velvet Room, Margaret is alone, as Igor has gone out; she congratulates the player on making the bonds related to the Moon and Strength Arcanas. When Dojima has to back out of going on a trip for Golden Week, Yu decides to take Nanako to hang out with his friends at Junes, who quickly warm up to her. The next day, Yosuke deduces that all of the victims so far have been women who were somehow linked to Yamano. A week later, on another rainy night, Yu watches the Midnight Channel and is surprised to see it showing Kanji Tatsumi, a notorious punk who attends Yasogami High School. Yu, Yosuke, Chie, and Yukiko discuss that although Kanji doesn't fit the criteria of all-female victims, there is a link between Kanji and Yamano. Tatsumi Textiles, Kanji's family shop, has a custom-made scarf that was seen as a noose on their first visit to the television world. Upon leaving the shop, the group sees Kanji talk with an unknown young man. The next day after school, splitting into teams, Yosuke and Chie attempt to trail Kanji as he meets up with the student from the previous day, while Yu and Yukiko stake out near the shop in order to catch the culprit. As Yukiko expresses her feelings about what she believes is her destined job at the Amagi Inn, Yosuke and Chie's cover is soon blown. Chie panics and says it would not be wrong for Kanji to meet up with another boy, but this upsets him to the point that he threatens to beat them. They run away from him, eventually involving Yu and Yukiko in the chase until they manage to lose him. That night, Yu watches the Midnight Channel, only to see Kanji as an overtly flamboyant gay host of a show investigating bathhouses, much to his and Yosuke's shock.
7	"Suspicious Tropical Paradise"	Jun Kumagai	November 18, 2011
In the Velvet Room, Margaret congratulates the guest that he has made a new bond, which has opened up the path to the Priestess Arcana, before Igor warns him that the danger befalling Inaba is coming closer. When the four enter back into the television world, Kanji is nowhere to be found. It is learned that Kanji made a bunny-shaped phone strap charm for a little boy after the latter had previously lost one. Yu borrows the charm to give to Teddie, who is able to track down the scent. At the bathhouse seen on the Midnight Channel, Kanji struggles with his other self in a compromising position, where he rejects the fact of being gay, which then transforms his other self into an overly muscular Shadow, flanked by two equally muscular and flamboyant lesser Shadows. As it seems that the group is no match against Kanji's Shadow, Yu fuses two Personas into Yamata-no-Orochi, also accepting the bunny-shaped phonestrap charm that Kanji made as "cute." This encourages Kanji to punch his own Shadow, taking it out of the battle. Kanji retorts to his other self that he is not gay but rather afraid of being rejected by either sex, turning his other self into his Persona, Take-Mikazuchi. Several weeks later, Kanji joins the group to find out who pushed him into the television world in the first place. That night, Dojima asks Yu if he has been getting involved in anything, aware that Yu was at Tatsumi Textiles and worried that he is getting in over his head.
8	"We've lost something important again"	Yūko Kakihara	November 25, 2011
In the Velvet Room, Igor is out again, and Margaret muses if their guest is only coming because he knows Igor is out, before she congratulates him on acquiring the Emperor Arcana. Knowing that a school camping trip is coming up, the group will get to cook curry together, so they prepare for the next day with food and supplies. While at the campsite, the curry the girls prepared had several ingredients in it, making it barely edible. Dubbed "Mystery Food X," Yu and Yosuke collapse in disgust after eating it, yet their classmate Hanako Ohtani loves the curry and eats it all. When Yu and Yosuke go to the first aid tent, they meet Naoki Konishi, Saki's younger brother, who had been feeling left out from activities since Saki's death, as everyone is trying to let him grieve. While the gang is hiding out eating food they have ordered from Aika, Kanji picks up Naoki from his post so the others can talk to him, giving him some peace of mind. That night, when Yu and Yosuke tell Kanji they are wary of sharing a tent with him after seeing his other self, he storms out to break into the girls' tent to prove otherwise, but Chie knocks him out. An unconscious Kanji is left with the snoring Hanako for the remainder of the night as Chie and Yukiko sneak into Yu and Yosuke's tent. On the last day of camping, Yosuke convinces the girls to go swimming, having bought swimsuits for them at Junes. But when they are offended by the boys, they throw them into the river. As they head back to camp, Hanako approaches Kanji, revealing that he is not her type, greatly upsetting him.
9	"No one sees the real me"	Mitsutaka Hirota	December 2, 2011
In the Velvet Room, Margaret notes that their guest has obtained the Hanged Man Arcana after his camping trip, and reminds him that his bonds will only strengthen the more he makes them. Deciding to take a break from her career due to exhaustion, popular singer and idol Rise Kujikawa, decides to go to Inaba to help out at Marukyu Tofu, her grandmother's tofu shop. While shopping at Junes, she meets Yu, who found her cellphone after accidentally dropping it. The following night, Rise appears on the Midnight Channel wearing a swimsuit, and the group decides to go to Marukyu Tofu to warn her of a potential kidnapping. They later manage to catch a stalker after Rise, who claims to be just a fanboy, and Adachi arrests him to question him for the kidnappings. The next day, Yu learns that Rise has started classes at Yasogami High School, and he helps her evade the paparazzi waiting for her outside the school. Her old agent goes to find her, revealing she has lost a movie role to her rival, which upsets her. When Yu attempts to console her, she believes Yu is no better than anyone else and runs off. That night, the Midnight Channel shows Rise as the host of a strip joint show, which a shocked Yu records.
10	"Real Me Doesn't Exist"	Mitsutaka Hirota	December 9, 2011
In the Velvet Room, Margaret reads their guest's fortune and warns him that a great danger approaches and he might not be strong enough to face it, even with all of his Arcanas thus far. Yu, Yosuke, Chie, Yukiko, and Kanji go into the television world to save Rise, finding her at the strip joint. As multiple other selves harass Rise, she rejects them, turning her main other self into a large Shadow. The gang summons their Personas to battle the Shadow, but she uses her special scanning ability to detect the strengths and weaknesses of their Personas, dodging their attacks and severely harming them. As she prepares a final attack, a fired-up Teddie rushes at the Shadow, who cannot detect what Teddie really is and, thus, cannot effectively counterattack. Teddie defeats the Shadow, albeit flattening himself in the process, and Rise realizes that she does not have a "real identity," transforming her other self into her Persona, Himiko. However, this causes Teddie to have an existential crisis, bringing forth his other self, which also turns into a Shadow, sucking Teddie's deflated body up and threatening to kill the others. As Teddie proclaims to his other self that he does not want the easy answers as to who he really is, Rise uses Himiko to detect the Shadow's weak spot, allowing Izanagi to defeat it, freeing Teddie, who accepts his other self and receives his own Persona, Kintoki-Douji.
11	"Catch Me If You Can"	Jun Kumagai	December 16, 2011
In the Velvet Room, Margaret congratulates their guest for forming the bond that gives him the Lovers Arcana, but warns him that the power can either be fruitful for love or harmful. When their homeroom teacher, Kinshiro Morooka - dubbed by the students as "King Moron" - is found murdered, the group is confused as he had not appeared on television, much less the Midnight Channel like the other victims. Curious if Morooka was thrown into the television world without their knowledge, they decide to talk to Teddie, amazed to find him in the real world this time and surprised to see that he has grown a human body inside his costume, horrifying the kids that find the head. They give him new clothes and have him blend in as a human. As the gang heads to Marukyu Tofu, they are met by the student Kanji was talking to before, who is revealed to be a junior detective named Naoto Shirogane, who confirms the three serial murders that have happened so far. Rise later agrees to join the gang to solve the mystery behind the victims and murders. The next day at school, the class is introduced to their new homeroom teacher, Noriko Kashiwagi, who behaves very flirtatiously. Later that day, Yukiko is approached by the same disturbed student who had been stalking her, but she again turns down his offer to go out with him. While at his house, upset over being rejected, the disturbed student - revealed to be Mitsuo Kubo, decides to take credit for the three murders to an online chatroom. But when he is brushed off as a troll, he storms out of his house and turns himself in to the police. The following day, while the group is at Junes, Naoto tells them that the police have closed the case due to Mitsuo turning himself in. Unconvinced, the group decides to check out the Midnight Channel once more, where they find Mitsuo taunting the viewer to catch him if they can.
12	"It's Not Empty At All"	Yūko Kakihara	December 23, 2011
In the Velvet Room, Margaret tells their guest that he has acquired the bond of the Star Arcana, before Igor warns him that his journey is reaching a climax with surprises in store. Margaret adds that his path is at a crossroads, and if he makes the wrong decisions, his journey will come to an end. She reminds him that there is only one truth before Igor warns him that defeat is not the only way to lose. The gang enters the television world to find Mitsuo in a video game simulation. They discuss how they believe Mitsuo is the culprit behind the murders and how Yukiko, Kanji, and Rise have all come into contact with him before they were thrown into the television world. By the time they track down Mitsuo, they see him arguing with his other self over the murders, while his other self claims that he is "empty." Once Mitsuo refuses its statements, it begins to transform into a Shadow. Suddenly, time skips forward to after the battle, when the group is planning a party to celebrate the resolution of the murder case. However, a month later, the group starts falling apart, despite Yu and Yosuke remaining friends, as do Chie and Yukiko. On a rainy night, Yu is unable to watch the Midnight Channel, let alone pass through the television. When he hears the voice of Mitsuo's Shadow inside his room, he taunts him, telling him that his bonds are now empty since he cannot summon his Persona anymore. Yu starts to give up hope when the Shadow strangles him, but Yosuke rescues him, revealing that they are in an illusion Mitsuo's Shadow created. Reunited with his friends, Yu confidently retorts to the Shadow that he is "far from empty" and summons several Personas representing all of the bonds he has made since his journey began to attack the Shadow. When the Shadow is defeated, they confront Mitsuo, who shamelessly admits to being behind the three murders but are surprised when his other self disappears instead of turning into a Persona. Yu proposes that the gang have a celebratory party for Mitsuo's arrest. After the party, Nanako and Teddie make a promise that he will come over to play with her, and Yosuke tells Yu about the shopping district's summer festival.
13	"A Stormy Summer Vacation 1/2"	Jun Kumagai	January 6, 2012
In the Velvet Room, Margaret congratulates their guest on surpassing the greatest challenge he has faced thus far. She advises him to take some time off to recover, and Igor mentions that it is helpful to have some reprieve, even if there is not much time left. On her way home during a downpour, Nanako passes by the local shrine and gives a fox her umbrella, coming home soaking wet. Nanako starts worrying when Yu comes home late, day after day. To find out what he is up to, she dresses up as her favorite cartoon character, Magical Detective Loveline, and tries to follow him around. She loses track of Yu when Teddie interrupts her for some pastries on her first attempt. The next day, the rest of the group shows up and decides to help her out, and after searching for Yu all day, they give up at sunset. As they wait at a bus stop, they see Teddie, in costume, apparently getting off the bus, confusing the group. When interrogating him, they realize he is not acting like himself, but he leaves before they can ask anything else. The following day, after Nanako finally tracks Yu down, she and the gang surprisingly find him with three women of different ages at separate times during the day. On the day of the summer festival, Nanako is at the fairgrounds by herself as Dojima has to work late, feeling she will never solve the case. However, Naoto finds her and cheers her up, prompting her to go throughout the festival looking for Yu. Nanako eventually finds him, and they watch the fireworks together, with everyone Yu has met over the past weeks thanking Yu for his help. Two days later, Dojima brings home watermelons for Nanako, Yu, and the rest of the group to enjoy. Nanako asks Yu what he has been up to for the whole summer break, and he tells her what he has done.
14	"A Stormy Summer Vacation 2/2"	Jun Kumagai	January 13, 2012
In the Velvet Room, Margaret is once again by herself, and she tells her guest that he will soon make the bonds to acquire several new Arcana. Yu goes out to buy a new umbrella for Nanako, who claims that she lost it the night before but is unable to afford one. After passing by the local shrine, the fox from before approaches him holding an ema. He is suggested to tutor Shu Nakajima while at the same time taking up another job at a local daycare. He stops Yuuta and Kaneko from fighting over the latter's toy robot, which breaks during the fight. When Yuuta's stepmother Eri Minami apologizes to Kaneko's mother, Yu takes the blame and offers to replace the expensive toy robot. Yuuta and Kaneko get into another fight a few days later after the former claims to have seen Magical Detective Loveline; unbeknownst to them, it was Nanako dressed in disguise. Yu dresses up in Teddie's costume to quell the tension. When he goes home in the costume, he crosses paths with Nanako and his friends. Later, as he heads to the shrine, he finds an old woman, Hisano Kuroda, unconscious after she had been mugged. He accompanies her to the hospital, where her attending nurse Sayoko Uehara flirts with Yu. Some days later, after a tutoring session, Shu reveals that he dislikes going to school and has no friends. During an impromptu date Yu gets dragged into, Sayoko reveals her dismay that, as a nurse, everyone she meets at work leaves as soon as they get better. Meeting with her, Eri reveals to Yu her stress at the strained relationship she has with Yuuta. Finding her, Kuroda tells Yu she is tired of being reminded of her deceased husband and throws a decorative comb he gave her into the river. A large carp jumps out of the water with the comb stuck in its fins as soon as she leaves. During the summer festival, after having caught the carp, he returns the comb to Kuroda, saying she should not be throwing away memories. Yu also sees Shu, who stole fireworks from the display after none of his classmates invited him to go see them, but Yu gives him a reversi set as a birthday gift and reminds him that two people are needed to play the game. He then finds Eri, who has been badly hurt after stepping in the way of Yuuta getting hit by a purse during another fight. Yu calls Sayoko, who walks him through the steps to get Eri better. Yu is thanked by those he has helped out over the past few weeks. The next day, the local shrine receives an excess of donations, which the fox lets Yu use to buy a new umbrella for Nanako.
15	"The Long-Awaited School Trip"	Yūko Kakihara	January 20, 2012
In the Velvet Room, Margaret and Igor congratulate their guest as he has formed the bonds giving him the Temperance, Tower, Death, Devil, and Hermit Arcanas. Margaret also tells him the more he strengthens the bonds, the stronger he will become. As summer vacation ends and classes begin, the freshmen and sophomores go on a field trip to Tatsumi Port Island. However, the hotel they will be staying in has been repurchased from a less-than-reputable organization. Teddie, waiting for the gang there, wants to score a date with Yukiko, which she agrees to do so during her free time the following day with the rest of the group. While the girls enjoy the rotating waterbed in their room, the boys (minus Teddie and Yu) have a more turbulent experience with their waterbed. The next day, the group split up while wandering the island. Yu catches up with Chie, who is defending a young boy from thugs, later revealing to Yu that she wants to find meaning in her self-worth, which is something he admires in her. The group reunites at a nightclub, where they are joined by Naoto. As they all enjoy free food and drinks - unaware that they were served alcohol - Teddie, Rise, Yukiko, and Yu supposedly get drunk and start acting out of character during a drinking game called "The King's Game." Naoto has a family history of being detectives that help the police and then requests that they reveal their involvement in the murders. Although Yukiko blurts out that they go into the TV to fight Shadows with their Personas, Naoto believes she is mocking the idea. The next day, the gang enjoys lunch together before leaving for Inaba. Back in Inaba, Naoto talks to someone on the phone, requesting more information on the self-styled gang and the Midnight Channel.
16	"Although the Case Was Closed"	Mitsutaka Hirota	January 27, 2012
In the Velvet Room, Margaret warns their guest that he is becoming lax, which may spell trouble, but Igor says he should move at his own pace, even though danger approaches. Naoto appears on the news to say that there are incongruities in the murder case and that it is still under investigation. The next day after school, Naoto approaches the gang and interrogates their involvement in the murder case. Naoto tells them they are not seen as possible suspects but as pawns in the game. Naoto goes on to reveal that Morooka's murder was the only one that sticks out, as he never appeared on television, nor the Midnight Channel, and was discovered with a fatal blunt force injury to the head. Naoto appears on the Midnight Channel at night, announcing an experimental operation to be born anew. When the group goes to the television world the next day, they are unable to find Naoto. As they return to the real world, the group splits up in their search for Naoto. According to Aika, Naoto had gotten into an argument with Adachi about how to handle the murder case. The group returns to the television world, bringing them to a secret laboratory. When they enter, they see Naoto chiding a doppelgänger for acting too much like a child. However, the other self reveals that Naoto is insecure about being seen only as a child rather than an adult detective. The Shadow also reveals that Naoto is really a girl. This causes Naoto to reject her other self, transforming it into a Shadow. Yosuke is struck by a beam that causes him to age rapidly. As the Shadow starts to attack the others, they retreat while Naoto is left in her Shadow's clutches.
17	"I Want to Know the Truth"	Mitsutaka Hirota	February 3, 2012
Alone in the Velvet Room, Margaret tells her guest the story of Black Frost, who asked the gods to end his loneliness. They gave him a friend who was alive for only one day, and when his friend disappeared after the day, he wished that he had never made his request if he knew how lonely it would make him feel. Teddie is hit by the aging beam when he protects the girls from the Shadow, and Yu is also hit after trying to vary his Personas against the Shadow. The Shadow laments Naoto's difficulty in making friends, her parents' death, and being discredited for her age and gender. After freeing himself from the debris from the Shadow's earlier attacks, Kanji charges at the Shadow, telling Naoto that he has grown past his struggle in making friends. Teddie manages to restore their ages using Kintoki-Douji, which allows Yu to summon Beelzebub and defeat the Shadow. Naoto accepts her other self, transforming it into the Persona, Sukuna-Hikona, before collapsing from exhaustion. When Yu returns to his house, Dojima and Adachi inform him about Naoto's safe return, yet Dojima surmises that Yu is somehow involved with the case. A month later, a recovered Naoto reveals that her kidnapping happened in quick succession, likely committed by a lone male. The group concludes that Mitsuo was only a copycat killer, given the circumstances of Morooka's death. Naoto asks if she can join the group to help, which they accept. After Naoto offers to have the whole group get physicals, the group is stunned to discover that Teddie is shown to have nothing in his body according to his X-rays. Kanji admits to Yu that Naoto has inspired him to be himself and help others to see who he really is. The next day, Yu catches up with Naoto, taking her to the Chinese Diner Aiya in order to solve the "case" behind the actual ingredients of the "rainy day special," a massive gyūdon. Elsewhere, someone types a letter stating, "Don't save anyone anymore."
18	"Anniversary to Become a Family"	Yūko Kakihara	February 10, 2012
In the Velvet Room, Margaret congratulates their guest for obtaining the Fortune Arcana. She then states that only another heart can bond with another heart before proposing a toast between herself and Yu Narukami. Adachi urgently calls Dojima regarding a hit-and-run accident which severely injures a woman that occurred at the Samegawa flood plains. The next day, Yu finds a photo of Dojima and his late wife with Nanako, and Nanako explains to Yu that her mother had died in a car accident of a similar case. At Junes, Yu studies for the midterms with his friends, while Teddie spends time with Nanako. At night, Nanako, holding a school form, suddenly gets a stomachache, while at the same time, Dojima receives a call from Adachi about a sealed letter for him from someone named Ichihara. Dojima immediately heads out, leaving Yu to care for Nanako, who explains that the school form was actually to invite parents to a class observation. Yu goes to the police station the next day to give Dojima the school form. They go to the Chinese Diner Aiya, where Dojima explains that his superior, Ichihara, gave him information about the recent hit-and-run. Dojima also reveals that his wife, Chisato, died in a similar accident while on her way to pick Nanako up from preschool. That night, after Yu gives Nanako her family photo in a frame, Nanako says that she hopes to reunite with her mother in Heaven. The next day, Yu asks Naoto if she can find out anything about Chisato's death but discovers that the case was left unsolved due to the lack of evidence. When Dojima comes home, Nanako is upset by the fact that he may not be able to come to the class observation since he is too caught up in his work. Yu tells Dojima that he should spend more time with his daughter instead of constantly trying to solve the hit-and-run. Overhearing the conversation, Nanako runs out of the house when Dojima tells her that the case is not her concern. Yu and Dojima go out looking for her with no luck, but they realize that she must be at the Samegawa flood plains, being reminded of where Chisato had died. When they find her, Dojima apologizes and promises to spend more time with her. The three of them celebrate becoming a family the following day, and Dojima says he will go to her class observation.
19	"It's School Festival Day! Time to Have Fun!"	Jun Kumagai	February 17, 2012
The Velvet Room is empty save for a placard saying they are out on business and a note from Margaret congratulating their guest for obtaining the Hierophant and Justice Arcanas. The school is holding its annual cultural festival, and Yu's class will be putting together a group-dating café. Yosuke had also signed up all of the girls in their group of friends for the beauty pageant without their consent, with Yu and Kanji voicing their support. During soccer practice with their classmate Daisuke Nagase, Kou complains that his class is hosting a play, and Yu kicks the soccer ball hard, which ends up hitting Ayane Matsunaga. Yu apologizes to her at the nurse's office and then asks to listen to her play the trombone. She reveals that she is only filling in for another student in the band who got hurt and will not be able to perform at the cultural festival and that she only plays music because she hopes that one day it will lift someone's spirits. A couple of days later, Chie signs all the boys in their group of friends for a drag pageantry without their consent as revenge for what Yosuke did. As the first day of the cultural festival begins, the group-dating café proves to be a bust. Yu later goes to the rehearsal room and sees Ayane, who has not improved her part ever since, and she steps down when the junior trombone player is healed in time for the cultural festival. However, after Yu speaks up to defend her, she brings him out of the room, explaining that even though she feels she has lost the chance to reach her dream, she is happy that he defended her, and all the practice made her remember her love for music. To make it up to her, Yu takes her around the cultural festival, cheering her up, until they cross paths with Ai, who takes Yu away for herself to see a tarot card reader who sounds suspiciously like Margaret. The drag pageantry happens on the final day of the cultural festival, which Teddie wins in a last-minute entry. Teddie's prize is to judge the beauty pageant, where he suggests a swimsuit competition for the girls, mortifying the girls in the group. Although Naoto chickens out during the contest, she ends up winning anyway. After the pageant, Rise tells Yu she is slightly disappointed in losing, but Yu says it is right to feel that way. Encouraged, Rise decides to return to her career in the following spring, accepting herself as a pop idol once again.
20	"We'll all meet at the AMAGIYA Hotel"	Mitsutaka Hirota	February 24, 2012
In the Velvet Room, Margaret senses a light within their guest, which she determines is because of his acquisition of the Sun Arcana. She then sings the "Long-Nosed Man Song," much to Igor's visible displeasure, before she reminisces about her younger sister. Following the cultural festival, Dojima says that he is going out of town the next morning. Yukiko invites Yu and Nanako over to her family's inn, but the rest of the group also insists on coming. Teddie is disappointed that the boys and girls are put in separate rooms, yet Kanji wonders why the boys' room looks so expensive. The boys are scared when the telephone suddenly rings, but it is just to inform them that the open-air bath is open, much to their relief. However, they are surprised to find the girls in the open-air bath already, consequently having a barrage of buckets thrown at them before they retreat. Then, Yukiko realizes that she got the allotted open-air bath times mixed up. Yukiko is later notified that a television crew wants to film a special regarding Yamano's death in the inn, but she refuses and tells them to leave. After the reporters leave, the boys call out the girls for taking up their slot in the open-air bath and demand an apology but the girls refuse, citing that the boys still tried to peek at them and they leave, causing the boys to take their frustration out by playing table tennis. When the boys later prepare for bed, they hear a distant voice, so they decide to sneak into the girls' room and stay with them. However, the boys are shocked to discover that they snucked into Hanako and Kashiwagi's room instead, running out of the room after the two literally throw themselves at the boys. Later on, Yu finds Yukiko still awake in the lobby. She tells him that she is prepping for her innkeeper's license test and that after accepting her other self in the past, she realizes that she wants to help run her family's business rather than leave the inn and live on her own. Yukiko thanks Yu and the others for helping her realize that and they both share a drink together. Late at night, Yu stares at a television set shut off while holding an envelope he received a week earlier. Inside the envelope, the letter says, "Don't save anyone anymore."
21	"DON'T SAVE ANYONE ANYMORE"	Jun Kumagai	March 2, 2012
In the Velvet Room, Igor comments that their guest's journey has been a long one and wonders if he will be able to solve the riddle at its end. Margaret mentions that not much time is left and asks their guest if he will be able to discover the truth. Naoto deduces that the sender may already know who Yu is since the letter was personally delivered to him. When he arrives home, he has dinner with Nanako. The news airs a local politician who has visited Nanako's school, mentioning a student who impressed him. She later feels sick, and Yu puts her to bed, promising they will make a snowman before he returns home. The next morning, the two prepare to turn on the kotatsu, but after discovering it is broken, Yu says he will pass by Junes to purchase a new one. Dojima comes home, holding another letter for Yu, which states, "If you don't stop, the next one to go in and die will be someone dear to you." Dojima, realizing that Yu has become too involved in the case, takes him to the police station for questioning, leaving Nanako home alone. At the police station, Yu reveals the nature of the television world, but Dojima, not believing this, has him stay in the station overnight. While working at Junes - Yosuke, teaching Teddie how to use a cellphone, calls Nanako, who relays what has happened to Yu earlier in the evening. The Midnight Channel displays Nanako on television, and Naoto believes this is because the politician was referring to Nanako in the news before. After the boys arrive at the station, Dojima is told by Naoto that Nanako may have been kidnapped by the serial killer, prompting him to find the culprit. Adachi locks the boys in the interrogation room not long before the girls arrive. Naoto explains to everyone there that the culprit is hauling around a television set in the back of a delivery truck, which Yukiko, Kanji, and Rise remember encountering prior to their kidnappings. Adachi says that the suspect might be a retired councilman now working at a delivery company, which Naoto realizes is Taro Namatame, the man who had the affair with Yamano. Adachi releases the boys and tells Dojima who the culprit is, just as Namatame, in his delivery truck, passes by Dojima on the road. Dojima gives chase until Namatame intentionally causes a car wreck that injures Dojima and flees the scene. As the group catches up to them, Naoto finds an address book detailing the addresses of the victims thus far that Namatame wanted to "save," including Nanako. However, Morooka was not among the victims' names. Yu sees a red envelope in the back of the truck containing a handmade ring Nanako made to congratulate him on his test scores. Dojima asks Yu to save Nanako since she is all he has left in his life. As the team makes it to Junes, ready to enter the television world, Nanako is approached by Namatame, who tells her everything will be alright.
22	"It's just like Heaven"	Jun Kumagai	March 9, 2012
In the Velvet Room, Igor reads their guest's fortune, and Margaret discovers exactly what fate lies in store for their guest. The team enters the television world to find a beautiful realm resembling Heaven. Encountering Nanako in the custody of Namatame, he claims that he wanted them all to face their true selves, but why he did it in such a deadly manner is beyond them. Namatame summons many Shadows that transform him into the Persona, Kunino-sagiri. Yu, blocking off the first round of attacks, is then possessed, having an antenna over his head, forcing him to attack his friends, repeatedly switching through many of his Personas. After hearing Nanako's voice, he finds the strength to destroy the antenna over his head and catches Nanako after Kunino-sagiri drops her. However, Kunino-sagiri then takes control of the others. Yu suddenly hears Dojima's voice telling him to save Nanako, giving him the resolve to fuse four of his Personas into a power Persona named Kohryu in order to free his friends, who all combine their strengths to destroy Kunino-sagiri. Nanako then helps Yu summon another Persona, Sraosha, to purify the area of the surrounding Shadows. Everyone returns to the real world to bring Nanako to the hospital, where she is placed in intensive care. A couple of weeks later, on a foggy morning, the news reports that Namatame - who is also hospitalized - is being interrogated for his actions. Yu lets the rest of the team know that they will be able to go to the hospital later to see Nanako, who is still recovering. Later, Adachi tells the group that Namatame tried to hit on Saki, which may have led to her death in the first place. When the group leaves the hospital, they hear people talking about how thick the fog has gotten lately. Much to their shock, when they put on their glasses, they are able to see through the fog, which Chie suggests could mean that the fog from the television world may be leaking into the real world. A week later, Teddie is saddened that he might have to return to the television world since the serial killer has finally been caught, but he wants to stay at least until Nanako fully recovers. However, Yu allows him to stay forever. When Chie mentions how cold it has gotten, it reminds Yu that he promised to buy a new kotatsu for Nanako. They all plan to throw a Christmas party for Nanako when Yu suddenly receives a call from Adachi, saying that Nanako's condition has worsened. He heads to the hospital and sees Nanako just as she appears to die in front of him.
23	"In Order to Find the Truth"	Mitsutaka Hirota	March 16, 2012
The team grieves after the apparent death of Nanako. The group enters Namatame's room, seemingly attempting to escape through a window. Namatame's Shadow then appears on the Midnight Channel on the television set, boasting that its desire to "save" people will never cease. Yu, grief-stricken and enraged after Nanako's death, first has the intention of pushing Namatame into the television set to face his own fate against his Shadow, but he then changes his mind. Although Yosuke is upset by this, Yu is not convinced that they have the full story just yet. While the team discusses what they know so far about the case, they realize that Teddie has gone missing. As they head outside, snow begins to fall, and everyone says goodbye to Yu and heads back to their homes. Yu breaks down crying after remembering the promise he made with Nanako to play with her in the snow, and Yosuke returns to comfort him. The next day, the team realizes that the warning letters that Yu previously received were not written by Namatame, who relates his discovery of the Midnight Channel and his ability to enter the television world. After first seeing Yamano on the Midnight Channel and learning of her death, he warned Saki about her appearance on it, but failed to convince her of the danger. However, when Yukiko appeared on the channel, he decided to kidnap her and throw her into the television world, believing it was the one place the murderer would not be able to reach. He believed he was successful when Yukiko did not die, repeating this method with the other "victims" that had appeared on the channel. Teddie is shown wandering in a foggy street, saddened that he was unable to protect Nanako, and says farewell to her and the team. In the hospital room, where Nanako is being kept, Teddie's farewell to her is heard, and Nanako silently revives. Everyone is overjoyed to see that Nanako has miraculously revived, even though Teddie remains missing. Back home, a relieved Yu falls asleep, while his cellphone lights up on its own, revealing his friends' text messages. In the Velvet Room, Igor remarks on his long journey and how their guest has acquired many bonds along the way. Margaret reveals that the friendships their guest has gained the Judgement Arcana. She then expresses her jealousy at the bonds he has made before realizing a bond has formed between herself and the guest as the Empress Arcana. She remarks that their limousine will be parked for a while until they can figure out the next direction they will travel. The next day, the team meets at the Chinese Diner Aiya to figure out who the real culprit is. Naoto steps out to get some air, and Yu joins her, but not before finishing the mega beef bowl for the first time, much to everyone's shock. After Yosuke joins them, the three each contemplate who the real killer could be with the knowledge they have, when Yu seems to have an epiphany as he stares up at the snowy sky.
24	"The World is Full of Shit"	Yūko Kakihara	March 23, 2012
Teddie is in the Velvet Room, where he reveals that he has discovered he is only a Shadow, but one that has acquired human emotions. He asks Yu to say goodbye to Nanako for him when he goes to Heaven, but Yu speaks to him and tells him Nanako is alive and well, much to his joy. Before Yu goes to the hospital, Yosuke expresses that he is both proud and jealous of how fast Yu has made friends, saying the only way he will feel better is if they fight to let out all of their pent-up emotions and become equals. Inside the Chinese Diner Aiya, the rest of the group discusses who the suspect might be since he was seen at the Amagi Inn before and would have also spoken to Saki in the past. At the hospital, Yu mentions to Yosuke that Mitsuo testified at trial that he blacked out in the police interrogation room right after turning himself in. They are met by Dojima and Adachi, who tell them that Namatame has already been transported into holding, much to Dojima's anger. Yu and Yosuke interrogate Adachi concerning the cases regarding Yamano and Saki, but he gives no straight answer, also mentioning that he forgot to send the threat letter to the laboratory as evidence. When the rest of the group shows up, they believe that he must be the suspect, based on how he did not react when Morooka was not among the names of the victims that were written in Namatame's address book. A pressured Adachi runs into Namatame's dark and empty room as the group is reminded of a television set in there. Meanwhile, Teddie goes to see Nanako, who has dreamed that he has disappeared, but she can still hear his voice. In the television world, Adachi is nowhere to be found, and the group is glad to finally see Teddie again, who reveals that he himself is a shadow. Encouraged by the others, Teddie senses that Adachi is inside the room with the noose. Adachi, who is a projection, reveals that the television and real worlds will soon merge, turning all humans into Shadows. They follow him to the shopping district, where he summons some Reapers in different places to attack them. As the group splits up to hold off the Reapers, the real story behind Adachi is unveiled. At the inn, Adachi had thrown Yamano into the television world after she rejected his advances. At the police station, Adachi had thrown Saki into the television world as well for rejecting his advances while he was interrogating her. Adachi says that Mitsuo's arrest and Namatame's salvation were just distractions for him to utilize in his "game." Still, it was interrupted when the group started to be involved in the case. He states to Yu that they should have a final showdown to determine who the television world prefers, as each of them summons their Personas, Yu's Izanagi versus Adachi's Magatsu Izanagi.
25	"We Can Change The World"	Yūko Kakihara	March 30, 2012
As he effortlessly attacks the team, Adachi says that the television and real worlds will soon combine, as seen by a dark matter gradually descending to the ground. Once humanity becomes Shadows, they will have no emotions and act only on raw instinct. The group takes out the Reapers one by one while also expressing their distaste for Adachi's plans. As Adachi makes his last stand against Yu, he takes him out, destroying his Persona. Realizing his defeat, Adachi decides to shoot himself, but the dark matter in the sky picks him up and says that it will rule over the new world. The dark matter calls himself Ameno-sagiri, a being that controls the fog that covers both worlds and has been awoken by human desires as it attacks them. Ameno-sagiri is merging the worlds so humans will no longer differentiate between reality and fantasy. In fact, the team's ability to face their Shadows in order to obtain Personas has only been a means for its plan to proceed, as the television world only shows what people want to see and hear. Ameno-sagiri raises Yu to test whether his bonds are strong and genuine and extract them from his body. As all of his friends call out to him, each of their Personas miraculously evolves into more powerful Personas. With the powers of Yosuke's Susano-o, Chie's Suzuka Gongen, Yukiko's Amaterasu, Kanji's Take-Jizaiten, Teddie's Kamui, Rise's Kanzeon, and Naoto's Yamato-Takeru combined, Yu summons the Persona, Lucifer, to finish off Ameno-sagiri, who before disappearing, realizes that the group has proven beyond the capabilities of human desires. The group finds Adachi and takes him with them to have him pay for his crimes. In the real world, Nanako wakes up, telling Dojima that she had a dream that Yu and his friends saved everyone. On Christmas Day, everyone celebrates Nanako's full recovery at Dojima's house. Three months later, Yu is later seen off by everyone else on his trip back to Tokyo, and after a heartfelt goodbye, Yu boards the train and heads home. In the Velvet Room, Igor remarks on their guest's amazing journey and reveals a crystal that has formed from the power he has gained, shining as it shows the way to truth. Margaret remarks on the bonds the guest has made while seeking out the truth and hopes he will continue in the future.
True–End	"No One is Alone"	Jun Kumagai	August 22, 2012
On March 20, 2012, Yu and his friends celebrate before his return to Tokyo. However, he strangely seems to be reliving the same day over again the next day. He receives a letter from Adachi in prison, who ponders about the source of the rumors about the Midnight Channel. Yu attempts to trace his memories back to his first arrival in Inaba, only to relive the same day yet again. Thanks to Nanako, he figures out that he shook hands with a gas station attendant before heading to Dojima's house. Going to the gas station, the attendant, revealed to be the goddess Izanami, reveals that she gave Yu the power to enter the television world by shaking hands, also being the case with Adachi and Namatame. Izanami explains that the Midnight Channel is a "window" meant to accommodate people's desires to reveal their true selves and uncover the secret lives of others. Yu has been suppressing the real truth that the team is confronting her right now, but all his friends have been swallowed up. Yu denies what he sees, choosing to repeat the same day over again, until Margaret appears to literally slap him out of his trance, bringing him into a fight against her where she summons the Persona, Helel, to attack him. Before he is hit, however, he is protected by the bonds of all his friends and acquaintances, and the Personas they represent defend him against Margaret's attacks, as their voices thank him and urge him forward. As the battle climaxes, his Shadow appears as a mountain of television sets, showing his suppressed fear of moving away and losing his friends. Yu admits to his feelings and accepts his Shadow, which returns to being Izanagi, who deals the final blow against Helel. In the aftermath, Margaret tells Yu that regardless of winning or losing, he will never be alone again and returns the Orb of Sight to him. Yu is returned to the battlefield, where the Orb of Sight has revealed the goddess's grotesque true form, Izanami-no-Okami. Yu resists her onslaught of attacks, proclaiming that he is far from alone in this world. He then unveils the World Arcana, the embodiment of all the bonds he has made, and summons the newly ascended Izanagi-no-Okami, who obliterates the goddess. Izanami begins to disintegrate while commending Yu's efforts, saying that the path of the future now rests on mankind's shoulders. Yu then wakes up to find his friends safe and the television world restored to the paradise it originally was, while the voice of Igor congratulates their obtainment of a "new world". Yu prepares to leave Inaba the next day as everyone else sees him off. After he boards the train, everyone begins to jog after him, shouting their goodbyes and pleas for his return someday. Yu, choking back tears, swears that he will never forget them. After the credits, Teddie explains his belief that the bonds they have all formed will never disappear, while on the train Yu looks at a photo of himself, his family, and friends all together.

== Home media ==
Aniplex started collecting the series in DVD and Blu-ray volumes starting on November 23, 2011. Limited edition versions of the Blu-ray and DVD releases include bonus CDs of the theme music, the soundtrack, and drama CDs. Aniplex also offers a special bulk buying option for the first three volumes through their digital retailers that includes an additional bonus CD of music not found on the first three volumes' bonus CDs. A special two-sided poster was given to people who reserved a copy of either the DVD or Blu-ray versions of volume 6 when purchased from specific retailers. Both the Blu-ray and DVD releases of Volume 10 also include a bonus disc featuring the compilation feature film "Persona 4: The Factor of Hope". With the release of Volume 10, there is a special bulk buying option to purchase all the Volumes with a box to house all of the discs, with the artwork designed by Shigenori Soejima.

Aniplex DVD (Japan)
Vol.	Episodes	Cover art		Bonus disc	Release date	Ref.
Vol.	Episodes	Blu-ray & First Press DVD	Standard DVD	Bonus disc	Release date	Ref.
1	1^{1}	Yu Narukami	Izanagi	First season opening & ending themes	November 23, 2011	
2	2–4	Yosuke Hanamura	Jiraiya	Original soundtrack volume 1	December 21, 2011	
3	5–7	Chie Satonaka	Tomoe Gozen	Drama CD volume 1 "A Day of the May Fool"	January 25, 2012	
4	8–10	Yukiko Amagi	Konohana-Sakuya	"True Story" by Rise Kujikawa (Rie Kugimiya)	February 22, 2012	
5	11–12	Kanji Tatsumi	Take-Mikazuchi	Original soundtrack volume 2	March 21, 2012	
6	13-15	Rise Kujikawa	Himiko	Second season opening & ending themes	April 25, 2012	
7	16-18	Teddie	Kintoki-Douji	Episode 13 & 18 ending themes	May 23, 2012	
8	19-21	Naoto Shirogane	Sukuna-Hikona	Drama CD volume 2 "Perfect Delivery"	June 27, 2012	
9	22-24^{1}	Ryotaro & Nanako Dojima	Magatsu-Izanagi	Original soundtrack volume 3	July 25, 2012	
10	25^{1} & True End	Margaret	Izanami-no-Okami	Persona 4: The Animation -The Factor of Hope- feature film	August 22, 2012	

1. ^{a} ^{b} ^{c} These episodes are director's cuts, rather than the versions shown in the television broadcast.

== See also ==
- List of Persona 4: The Golden Animation episodes - 2014 retelling of the series by A-1 Pictures based on the game's updated port
