= List of Persona 4: The Golden Animation episodes =

- Season 4
- Cover of the first Blu-ray and DVD volume featuring Yu Narukami
- No. of episodes: 12 + 1 OVA

Release
- Original network: MBS
- Original release: July 10 – September 25, 2014

Season chronology
- ← Previous; Persona4 the ANIMATION

Persona 4: The Golden Animation, stylized as Persona4 the Golden ANIMATION, is a 2014 anime television series produced by A-1 Pictures based on Atlus' Persona 4 video game. The series is an expansion of AIC ASTA's 2011 adaptation, Persona4 the ANIMATION, featuring new scenarios adapted from the game's 2012 PlayStation Vita port, Persona 4 Golden. Building on the adventures of Yu Narukami, a teenage boy who discovers a distorted TV World and obtains the power of Persona, the series focuses on Yu's encounter with Marie, a resident of the mysterious Velvet Room who seeks to regain her memory. They work together to solve the murders caused by the TV World and to put the person behind it to justice.

The 12-episode series aired on MBS' Animeism programming block between July 10, 2014, and September 25, 2014. Seiji Kishi, who directed the previous series, is chief director with Tomohisa Taguchi as director and Jun Kumagai writing the series composition. Shoji Meguro and Tetsuya Kobayashi provide the soundtrack. An original video animation episode featuring an alternate ending was included on the fourth Blu-ray Disc/DVD volume, released on December 10, 2014. The main opening theme is "Next Chance to Move On" by Shihoko Hirata, whilst the main ending theme is "Dazzling Smile" by Hirata (Marie (Kana Hanazawa) in episode 11). The opening theme for episode one is "Shadow World", the opening theme of Persona 4 Golden, also performed by Hirata, while the opening theme for episode eight is "key plus words", the second opening theme of Persona4 The ANIMATION, by Hirata and Yumi Kawamura.

The series is licensed in North America by Aniplex of America, who simulcast the series on Crunchyroll, Hulu, Daisuki, and the Aniplex Channel. The series has been released on two subtitled Blu-ray volumes on July 21, 2015, and September 29, 2015, respectively. It is recommended to watch this anime after watching the original Persona 4 one, as this skips over multiple aspects of the main story to focus on content added in the Golden version of the game.

== Episode list ==
No.	Title	Original air date (Note: As episodes air after midnight in Japan, broadcast actually takes place the calendar date after the listed dates.)
1	"THE GOLDEN DAYS"	July 10, 2014
In April, Yu Narukami arrives in Inaba, where he will be staying for a year due to his parents' work, and briefly encounters a mysterious-looking girl before meeting up with his uncle and cousin, Ryotaro and Nanako Dojima. While stopping at a gas station on the way to the Dojima residence, Yu feels an odd sensation after shaking hands with the station's attendant, but passes it off as fatigue. After transferring into Yasoinaba High School and making friends with his classmates, Yosuke Hanamura, Chie Satonaka, and Yukiko Amagi, Yu learns of a rumor about the "Midnight Channel" that appears on television sets during rainy nights and decides to try it for himself. As Yu finds the channel to be real, displaying a girl in some peril, he hears a voice in his head and discovers he can put his hand inside the TV screen. The next day, Yu proves what he experienced to Yosuke and Chie as they all wind up falling inside a big screen TV at the Junes superstore Yosuke's father owns, ending up in a strange world shrouded in fog. While searching for a way out, Yu chases after a silhouetted figure and finds a room filled with blood and slashed posters. There, they encounter a bear-like creature named Teddie who tells the group to leave, giving Yu a pair of glasses which allow him to see through the fog. As the group suddenly finds themselves surrounded by monsters known as Shadows, Yu hears the voice once again and manages to call forth a "Persona" named Izanagi, using its power to defeat all of the attacking Shadows. A few days later, as Yu is brought to the mysterious Velvet Room, where one of its residents, Margaret, introduces him to the girl he met before, Marie, asking him to take her into the outside world to help her regain her lost memories. Yu brings Marie to the top of a hill, where she feels a sense of nostalgia and feels embarrassed after blurting out one of her poems.
2	"THE PERFECT PLAN"	July 17, 2014
At the start of May, Yu introduces Marie to his other friends as they take her to eat steak skewers. Later, in June, Yu and Yosuke decide to apply for a scooter license in the hopes of getting "up close and personal" with other girls, while Marie makes plans to go shopping with Yu, Chie, and Yukiko. After Yu manages to get his scooter license, Ryotaro decides to give him his old scooter. Due to reasons beyond Yu's control, both the girls' shopping trip and Yosuke's plan to pick up girls end up being scheduled for the same day. Upon arriving in Okina City, Yu attempts to plan his schedule so he can spend time with both Yosuke and the girls without hurting either party's feelings. However, Yu's plans are thrown into chaos when Yosuke and Kanji Tatsumi propose a challenge to get phone numbers from as many girls as possible, with Yu's dignity on the line. Feeling he may get his chance during the shopping trip, Yu joins the girls at the Croco Fur clothes shop and ends up in the middle of a fashion squabble between Chie and Ai Ebihara, resulting in him juggling between the two contests. Things get worse when Yu hears from Nanako that Ryotaro is coming home earlier than planned, wanting the three of them to eat together. In the end, Marie manages to sort out the dispute between Chie and Ai, while the pick up contest ends in a draw after the sole number Yosuke managed to obtain turns out to be a bust, particularly for his motorcycle, after which an exhausted Yu returns home.
3	"I have amnesia, is it so bad?"	July 24, 2014
In July, following the rescue of Rise Kujikawa, Yosuke proposes that everyone go to the beach during the summer break since everyone else has managed to get scooter licenses, and he invites Marie to come along with them. When they finally get a chance to go to the beach near the end of their summer break in late August, everyone has fun playing in the sea. Things soon get awkward when Kanji loses his swimming trunks, forcing the guys to try and cover his shame before the girls can see. Marie gets a bit defensive when the others start asking about her background, but becomes warmed by their kind apologies. After talking with Margaret, Marie interviews the others about what it means to face one's true self, with each recounting their own experiences, before everyone spends the last day of summer watching fireworks. As Yosuke makes plans for a skiing trip in the winter, Marie decides she will try to regain her memories with Yu's help.
4	"THE MIDNIGHT TRIVIA MIRACLE QUIZ!" (Japanese: THE MAYONAKA OHDAN MIRACLE QUIZ!)	July 31, 2014
In September, shortly after the rescue of Naoto Shirogane, Yu informs the others about Marie's missing memories, with the only clue to them being a wooden comb Marie has in her possession. The group begins looking into where the comb comes from, and the owner of Daidara metal works suggests to them that it may come from another world. Upon hearing this, Marie experiences an intense headache and passes out. Upon waking up in Kanji's family's textile shop, Marie grows fearful when she overhears Kanji's mother mention that combs tend to represent parting. Over the weekend, Marie becomes separated from the others during a shopping trip, growing anxious until Yu manages to find her at the police station. Marie vents her frustrations over not being able to remember her own memories, and mentions that she experiences pain whenever she tries to remember. Wanting to cheer Marie up, Yu brings her to participate in a quiz show that Teddie decided to put together for everyone. As Marie finds she is able to answer some of the questions, she realizes that she has been making new memories with her friends all this time. After managing to win the quiz, Marie makes a promise to herself not to forget these new memories.
5	"Let's go get it! Get Pumped!"	August 7, 2014
During October, Yosuke is put under pressure when a planned event featuring Rise's former industry rival Kanami Mashita ends up getting cancelled due to the commotion concerning Naoto's disappearance, ruining Junes' plans to hold a sale at the same time. Fearing that his father may be transferred out of Inaba if Junes does not pull in a large crowd, Yosuke asks Rise to perform in Kanami's place. She agrees, but on the condition that the group gets on stage with her as her backup band. With no one having any experience with playing instruments, the gang starts practicing how to play in time for Rise's performance. The group is soon quick to notice Marie overly trying hard to make a worthwhile memory, but she receives some helpful support from Rise. On the day of the performance, Rise has trouble reaching the concert when an Internet rumor leads to a large crowd surrounding her house. Marie takes to the stage to buy some time for Chie to get Rise to the event with help from the sports captains. As the team celebrates a successful turnout, Marie feels a disturbing sensation when she sees Tohru Adachi in the crowd below.
6	"See? I told you Yu."	August 14, 2014
Adachi recalls when he was first transferred to Inaba, where he began working under Dojima. A month after arriving in Inaba, Adachi discovered the Midnight Channel and learned of his ability to enter the TV. When asked to bodyguard newscaster Mayumi Yamano at the Amagi Inn, Adachi, who felt betrayed by her alleged affair, pushed her into the TV, where she became the first victim of the Shadows, later doing the same to Saki Konishi, who became the second victim. Some time later, Yu took an interest in Adachi and started to befriend him, offering to help him out when he could. Back in the present, on October 10, Marie urges Yu to stay away from Adachi, sensing a bad vibe from him, though Adachi simply remarks that Marie is not necessarily trustworthy herself. The next month, after Nanako gets caught up in the Midnight Channel and seemingly dies from her experience, Adachi approaches Yu, smugly claiming he was right.
7	"It's cliché, so what?"	August 21, 2014
On December 4, after Nanako survives her ordeal, Yu, realizing Adachi is the mastermind behind the murders, goes by himself to the TV world to confront him. When their respective Personas, Izanagi and Magatsu-Izanagi, clash against each other, a flash appears showing Yu and Adachi the world from each other's perspective. As such, Yu sees all the hardships that Adachi had gone through, with Yu's acts of kindness only pushing him further off the edge. As Yu feels his attempts to befriend Adachi were just his own selfishness, he is approached by Marie, who had heard about his ordeal from Margaret. Marie reminds Yu that even if his efforts to help her were out of selfishness, he should not consider them meaningless, giving him her comb as she resolves to find her old memories. Supported by his friends, Yu once again confronts Adachi and beats him, reminding him that they too share a bond. Adachi is then possessed by the god Ameno-sagiri, but manages to bestow Magatsu-Izanagi to Yu, who defeats the Shadow and rescues Adachi. Meanwhile, Marie is approached by a mysterious figure and remembers who she really is, deciding she can no longer stay with the others and disappearing, along with all memories of her.
8	"Not So Holy Christmas Eve"	August 28, 2014
As Christmas approaches, Yu and the boys make plans for a party on Christmas Eve, although the manner in which Yu invites each of the girls leaves them to believe they are being asked out on a date. As each of the girls tries to prepare themselves for the day without letting on to the others, Naoto becomes paranoid that the other girls are planning to kill her. On Christmas Eve, with the boys unable to help Yu with the party preparations, he interprets the arrival of each of the girls as helpers sent by Teddie, giving each of them errands to do while he goes shopping. Things soon get chaotic when the actual helper, Ai, arrives and ends up clashing with the other girls and making a mess, resulting in further confusion when Naoto and Yu arrive. As a result of the chaos, the group instead holds their party the next day, celebrating Nanako's temporary discharge from hospital. Shortly after the New Year rolls in, Yu comes down with a fever, during which he sees a vision of Marie, who he had completely forgotten about.
9	"A missing piece"	September 4, 2014
On February 11, the group heads to the mountains for a two-day skiing trip to make some memories before Yu returns home the following month. As the group spends the day skiing and snowboarding, Yu gets the feeling he is forgetting something important, which becomes more apparent when the group looks over photos and videos from the past year and notice something does not add up. Upon realizing that there was somebody alongside them that they have somehow forgotten about, Yu and the others decide they should investigate once they return home. The next day, Yu gets into an accident and has a dream, where he finally remembers that Marie was the one everyone spent time with. After Yu wakes up in a small hut alongside the others, who have also regained their memories of Marie, they are alerted to a television turning on by itself.
10	"Not a friend anymore"	September 11, 2014
After entering the TV, Yu and his friends are scattered across an isolated part of the TV World known as the Hollow Forest. Yu is approached by Margaret, who explains that Marie had shut herself away after regaining her true memories, revealing that should the forest become completely closed off, her existence will disappear from everyone's memories. Meanwhile, as the others manage to regroup, they are approached by Marie, who intends to let herself die so as to not cause the others pain. As Yu rejoins them, Marie further reveals that her true name is Kusumi-no-Okami, a god who was affectively a spy for Ameno-Sagiri and Kunino-Sagiri, the ones responsible for the TV World's fog. Refusing to let her disappear on her own, Yu and the others pursue Marie deeper into the forest, fighting off the powerful Shadows that stand in their way. The girls attempt to reason with Marie, but she becomes possessed by Kusumi-no-Okami, who unleashes a powerful attack that seemingly wipes out the whole group.
11	"Let it OUT! Let it GO!"	September 18, 2014
In a vision, Marie explains to Yu that her duty as Kusumi-no-Okami is to absorb the fog released by the other gods into her body. Having absorbed all the fog that would have been released when Ameno-Sagiri was defeated, Marie chose to vanish in the Hollow Forest to prevent the fog from being released to the human world. After hearing this, Yu manages to stand up, again, and fights against Kusumi-no-Okami, managing to get Marie to express her true desires to be saved and spend more time with everyone. Upon hearing Marie's voice, Yu and the others manage to bring out the full power of their Personas and open a gateway for Yu to enter Kusumi-no-Okami's body and rescue Marie. With Marie no longer wanting to die, Yu and the others escape from the Hollow Forest before it collapses in on itself, arriving safely back at the ski resort. After celebrating a successful rescue with a snowball fight and more hot spring hijinks, Yu is faced with an even greater threat; homemade Valentine's Day chocolates from Nanako and Marie.
12	"Welcome Home"	September 25, 2014
On March 20, the day before Yu is due to return home, the group decide to write out wishes to bury in a time capsule. As Yu still has unfinished business concerning the truth behind his Persona ability and the Midnight Channel, Marie is suddenly possessed by the goddess Izanami, challenging Yu to find out the truth with Marie's existence at stake. Yu and the others attempt to fight against Izanami, but Yu becomes hesitant when Izanami reveals Marie was once a part of her, fearing that defeating Izanami would destroy Marie too. Dragged into a dark abyss, Yu is rescued by Marie, who states she plans to become one with Izanami and become Izanagi-no-Kami, wishing to bring hope to mankind. Together, Yu and Marie stand together against Izanami, defeating her and having her merge with Marie, who assures Yu she will always be nearby before disappearing. Later in the year, Yu returns to Inaba during the summer break and reunites with the others, learning Marie is now happily working as a TV weatherwoman, and is surprised when she confesses her love to him.
OVA	"Thank you, Mr. Accomplice"	December 10, 2014
An alternate ending. On December 6, instead of getting in touch with his friends, Yu decides to once again confront Adachi alone, stating that he wants to help him. To this end, Adachi coerces Yu into destroying the threatening letter he wrote, instructing him to answer each of his calls if he does not want to be arrested for destroying evidence. As a result, Marie does not get in contact with Yu again, the fog never clears, and the investigation remains unsolved by the time Yu has to return home.

== Home media ==
Aniplex began releasing the series in Japan on Blu-ray and DVD volumes from September 10, 2014. An original video animation episode was included on the fourth volume.

Aniplex (Japan)
Vol.	Episodes	Blu-ray / DVD artwork	Bonus disc	Release date	Ref.
1	1	Yu Narukami	Theme Song CD	September 10, 2014	
2	2, 3	Teddie & Yosuke	Drama CD	October 8, 2014	
3	4, 5	Chie & Yukiko	Original Soundtrack	November 12, 2014	
4	6, 7, "Another End" OVA episode	Yu & Adachi	Drama CD	December 10, 2014	
5	8, 9	Naoto, Kanji & Rise	Original Soundtrack	January 14, 2015	
6	10, 11, 12	Yu & Marie	Cast Commentary CD	February 11, 2015	

== See also ==
- List of Persona 4: The Animation episodes - An episode list of the 2011 adaptation by AIC ASTA.
