= Persona 4 =

2008 video game

- Original cover art
- Developer: Atlus
- Publishers: JP/NA: Atlus; PAL: Square Enix (PS2); WW: Sega (Windows, Nintendo Switch, PlayStation 4, Xbox One, Xbox Series X/S)
- Directors: Katsura Hashino; Atsushi Watanabe (Golden); Teppei Kobayashi (Golden)
- Designers: Atsushi Watanabe; Azusa Kido
- Programmers: Yujiro Kosaka; Nobuyoshi Miwa (Golden)
- Artist: Shigenori Soejima
- Writers: Azusa Kido; Yuichiro Tanaka; Akira Kawasaki; Teppei Kobayashi (Golden)
- Composer: Shoji Meguro
- Series: Persona
- Platforms: PlayStation 2; PlayStation Vita; Windows; Nintendo Switch; PlayStation 4; Xbox One; Xbox Series X/S
- Release: July 10, 2008: Persona 4 PlayStation 2; JP: July 10, 2008; NA: December 9, 2008; AU: March 12, 2009; EU: March 13, 2009 Persona 4 Golden PS Vita; JP: June 14, 2012; NA: November 20, 2012; AU: February 21, 2013; EU: February 22, 2013 Windows; WW: June 13, 2020 NS, PS4, XBO, XSX; WW: January 19, 2023
- Genres: Role-playing, social simulator
- Mode: Single-player

Persona 4, (Note: Japanese: ペルソナ4, Hepburn: Perusona Fō) released outside Japan as Shin Megami Tensei: Persona 4, is a 2008 role-playing video game by Atlus. It is chronologically the fifth installment in the Persona series, and was released for the PlayStation 2 in Japan in July 2008, North America in December 2008, and in Europe and Australia in March 2009. It was one of the final major exclusives for the system. An enhanced version of the game, Persona 4 Golden, (Note: Japanese: ペルソナ4 ザ・ゴールデン, Hepburn: Perusona 4 Za Gōruden; known as Persona 4: The Golden in Japan) was released for PlayStation Vita in 2012 and received ports to Windows in 2020, and Nintendo Switch, PlayStation 4, Xbox One, and Xbox Series X/S in 2023. A full remake of the game, Persona 4 Revival, will be released on February 18, 2027 for PlayStation 5, Windows, Xbox Series X/S, and in May 2027 for the Nintendo Switch 2.

The game takes place in a fictional Japanese countryside in 2011 as a player-named protagonist moves into the town of Inaba from the city for a year. During his year-long stay, he becomes involved in investigating mysterious murders with a group of friends while harnessing the power to summon physical manifestations of their psyches known as a Persona. Much like Persona 3 before it, the game features role-playing and simulation elements: the protagonist progresses through a cycle of days, explores dungeons while encountering enemies, and can forge relationships that can improve their Personas' strength in battle.

The plot of Persona 4 was inspired by the work of mystery novelists owing to its murder mystery premise, primarily as a way of differentiating it from its predecessor. The rural setting was based on a town on the outskirts of Mount Fuji; it was intended to be a "'nowhere' place" and is the central setting to have players sympathize with the daily life of the characters. The developers added many in-game events to prevent the game from becoming stale. During localization, numerous alterations to Japanese cultural references were made to preserve the effect as much as possible.

The release of Persona 4 in Japan was accompanied by merchandise such as character costumes and accessories. The game's music was primarily composed by series composer Shoji Meguro, with vocals performed by Shihoko Hirata. The Western releases came with a soundtrack CD with selected music from the game. The game received critical acclaim, with praise given to its gameplay, story, emotional depth, characters, and music. Golden received higher praise for its addition of new content and visual upgrades over the original. The latter, in addition to its numerous console ports in the early 2020s, sold around 2.5 million copies worldwide.

In retrospect, Persona 4 is often considered to be one of the greatest video games ever made by several outlets. The game would see manga and light-novel adaptations, and an anime adaptation by AIC ASTA. The characters of Persona 4 have been featured in several spin-off games, including the fighting game Persona 4 Arena (2012), its sequel Persona 4 Arena Ultimax (2013), the rhythm game Persona 4: Dancing All Night (2015), and the Nintendo 3DS titles Persona Q: Shadow of the Labyrinth (2014) and Persona Q2: New Cinema Labyrinth (2018).

== Gameplay ==
A standard battle in Persona 4 Golden. Certain actions such as a successful attack will prompt a dialogue box on top. Players navigate between battle options listed in the box on the bottom-left of the screen, while the character portraits on the right hand of the screen indicate each member's health and magic points.

Persona 4 blends traditional RPG gameplay with simulation elements. The player controls the game's protagonist, a teenage boy who is named by the player, who comes to the town of Inaba for a year. Gameplay is divided between the real world of Inaba, where the protagonist carries out his daily life, and the mysterious "TV World", where various dungeons filled with monsters known as Shadows await. With the exception of scripted events, such as plot progression or special events, players can choose to spend their day how they like, be it participating in various real world activities, such as joining school clubs, taking part-time jobs, or reading books, or exploring the TV World's dungeons to gain experience and items while progressing the story. Days are broken up into various times of day, the most frequently recurring being "After School/Daytime" and "Evening", with most activities causing time to move on. Certain activities are limited depending on the time of day, days of the week, and the weather, with most evening activities unavailable if the player visits the TV World that day. Furthermore, some activities and dialogue choices may be limited by the protagonist's five attributes; Understanding, Diligence, Courage, Knowledge, and Expression, which can be increased by performing certain activities that build them. Whilst the player is free to choose how to spend time, if someone who is trapped in the TV World is not rescued by the time fog appears in town, which takes place after several days of consecutive rain, that person will get killed by the shadows and the game will end, forcing the player to return to a week prior, or load a previous save file. As the game progresses, the protagonist forms friendships with other characters known as "Social Links", which are each represented by one of the Major Arcana. As these bonds strengthen, the Social Links increase in Rank, which grant bonuses when creating new Personas in the Velvet Room. Additionally, strengthening Social Links with the main party members grant them additional abilities, such as the ability to perform a follow-up attack or an additional ability for their Persona.

=== Personas ===
The main focus of the game revolves around Personas, avatars projected from one's inner self that resemble mythological figures and represent the façades worn by individuals to face life's hardships. Each Persona possesses its own skills, as well as strengths and weaknesses to certain attributes. As Personas gain experience from battle and level up, that Persona can learn new skills, which include offensive, or support abilities used in battle, or passive skills that grant the character benefits. Each Persona can carry up to eight skills at a time, with older skills needing to be forgotten in order to learn new ones. Whilst each of the main party members have their own unique Persona, which transforms into a stronger form after maxing out their Social Link, the protagonist has the "Wild Card" ability to wield multiple Personas, which he can switch between during battle to access different movesets. The player can earn new Personas from Shuffle Time, with the protagonist able to carry more Personas as he levels up. Outside of the dungeons, the player can visit the Velvet Room, where players can create new Personas, or summon previously acquired Personas for a fee. New Personas are created by fusing two or more monsters to create a new one, which receives some of the skills passed down from its material monsters. The level of Personas that can be created are limited by the protagonist's current level. If the player has built up a Social Link relating to a particular Arcana, then a Persona relating to that Arcana will receive a bonus upon creation.

Persona 4 Golden added bike trips as a daytime activity, to be undertaken with each of the members of the party, individually. This grants a skill that party member would otherwise not be able to learn, or enables the relearning of previously discarded skills.

=== Combat ===
Inside the TV World, the player assembles a party, consisting of the protagonist and up to three other characters, to explore randomly generated dungeons, each tailored around a victim who had been kidnapped. On each floor of a dungeon, the player may find roaming Shadows, as well as treasure chests containing items and equipment. Players progress through the dungeon by finding the stairs somewhere on each floor to progress to the next, eventually reaching the final floor where a boss enemy awaits. The player enters battle upon coming into contact with a Shadow. The player can gain an advantage by attacking the Shadow from behind, whilst being attacked from behind themselves will give the enemy an advantage. Similar to the Press Turn system used in other Megami Tensei games, battles are turn-based with characters fighting enemies using their equipped weapons, items, or the special skills of their Personas. Aside from the protagonist, who is controlled directly, the other characters can either be given direct commands or be assigned 'Tactics' which alter their battle AI. Party members are knocked out if they lose all their HP, but may be revived through items or abilities; however, the battle ends if the protagonist loses all of his HP, after which the player is given an opportunity to reload a save file or restart the battle. Otherwise, the game ends, returning players to the title screen.

Offensive abilities carry several attributes, including Physical, Fire, Ice, Wind, Electricity, Light, Dark and Almighty. As well as various enemies carrying different attributes, player characters may also have strengths or weaknesses against certain attacks depending on their Persona or equipment. By exploiting an enemy's weakness or performing a critical attack, the player can knock them over, granting the attacking character an additional move, whilst the enemy may also be granted an additional move if they target a player character's weakness. If the player knocks all of the enemies down, they may be granted the opportunity to perform an "All-Out Attack", in which all party members rush the downed enemies to inflict heavy damage. Following a battle, players gain experience points, money, and items from their battle. Sometimes after a battle, the player may participate in a mini-game known as "Shuffle: Time" and "Arcana Chance", which can grant player new Personas or various bonuses respectively.

== Plot ==
=== Setting and characters ===
Persona 4 takes place in the fictional rural Japanese town of Inaba (稲羽市, Inaba-shi), which lies among floodplains and has its own high school and shopping districts. Unexplained murders have taken place in the small town, where bodies are found dangling from television antennas with their cause of death being unknown. At the same time, a rumor has begun to spread that watching a switched-off television set on rainy midnights will reveal a person's soulmate. The game also follows the main characters into the TV World, a fog-shrouded realm filled with monsters called Shadows, which can only be accessed through TV sets.

The protagonist is a high school student, named Yu Narukami in later media, who has recently moved from the city to attend school at Inaba. At school, he quickly becomes friends with Yosuke Hanamura, the somewhat-clumsy son of the manager of the local Junes Department Store; Chie Satonaka, an energetic girl with a strong interest in martial arts; and Yukiko Amagi, a calm and refined girl who helps out at her family's inn. A few days into the game, the protagonist, Yosuke, and Chie follow the "Midnight Channel" rumor, which leads them to discover the TV World and meet Teddie, a friendly creature that appears as a hollow bear costume. Using Personas, the students form an Investigation Team to investigate the connection between the TV world and the murders, and possibly capture the culprit. As the game progresses, the group gains new members, including: Kanji Tatsumi, a male delinquent who has a talent for feminine hobbies; Rise Kujikawa, a former teen idol trying to find her identity who moves to Inaba as a transfer student; and Naoto Shirogane, a young female detective investigating the case with the local police who wears masculine clothing and presents herself as male due to fear of rejection.

=== Story ===
On April 11, 2011, Yu Narukami arrives in Inaba to live with the Dojimas, consisting of his uncle Ryotaro Dojima and his cousin Nanako, for one year, as his parents are working abroad. Just after his arrival, a TV announcer, Mayumi Yamano, is found dead, her body hanging from an antenna; Saki Konishi, the high school student who had discovered the body, is later found dead herself, hanged upside-down from a telephone pole. After Yu and his friends accidentally enter the TV world, they encounter Teddie, who helps them travel freely between the TV and real worlds. They awaken their Persona abilities, realizing that the murders stem from attacks by Shadows, beings native to the TV world created from repressed emotions, and are able to rescue several would-be victims. Yosuke, Chie, Yukiko, Kanji, Rise, and Teddie one by one come to accept the parts of their psyches they rejected, which manifest as giant Shadows in the TV world, allowing them to wield Personas whilst each joins the group in turn. Mitsuo Kubo, a student from another high school who disappears following the death of Kinshiro Morooka, Yu's foul-mouthed homeroom teacher, claims credit for the murders; it is eventually learned that Kubo only killed Morooka and played no part in the other murders, having murdered Morooka simply to gain credit for the other murders. Naoto Shirogane, a nationally renowned "Detective Prince" investigating the case, is also rescued and gains a Persona, and joins the group who learn that "he" is actually a girl who assumed a male identity to avoid the police's sexism.

Events come to a head when Ryotaro Dojima realizes Yu is involved in the case after seeing Yu reading a threatening letter from the killer. Nanako is kidnapped during Yu's interrogation, leading Ryotaro to engage in a vehicular pursuit with the culprit. The chase ends as they both crash; the kidnapper escapes with Nanako through a television set in his truck, and the gravely-injured Ryotaro entrusts her rescue to the group. The group tracks them down within the TV world; the culprit, Taro Namatame, becomes possessed by the nearby Shadows and transforms into Kunino-Sagiri which attacks them but is defeated, and both he and Nanako are taken to the Inaba hospital. During Nanako's stay at the hospital, the fog that appears when the Midnight Channel occurs persists in the real world beyond the deadline, causing increasing panic among Inaba's inhabitants. When Nanako appears to die, the group furiously confronts Namatame, and a pseudo-Shadow Namatame appears on the Midnight Channel to goad the devastated and emotionally vulnerable group into throwing him in; as Yu, the player must help the others realize that Namatame is not the killer by pointing out the unanswered questions and lack of a proper motive.

Upon being questioned by the Investigation Team, Namatame explains that his kidnappings were an attempt to protect those who appeared on the Midnight Channel from the killer, not realizing that the TV world was dangerous and that trapping them within was how the murder victims were killed; he also denies sending Yu any warning letters. Upon looking over all of the evidence they have gathered, the Investigation Team determines that the real killer, and the writer of the threat letters, is none other than Ryotaro's partner, Tohru Adachi, who inadvertently confirms their suspicions when confronted and flees into the TV world. It is possible to fail to deduce the real killer's identity; doing so or killing Namatame by throwing him into the TV both result in bad endings, in which the recurring fog permanently sets in, leading to humanity's demise. Killing Namatame also results in Nanako remaining dead; otherwise, she will be resuscitated and revived.

Having identified Adachi as the true culprit, the party chases and locates him within the TV world. Adachi explains that his actions were out of both boredom and the belief that humanity is better off believing what it wants, revealing that he tricked Namatame into throwing people into the TV world and observed the Investigation Teams subsequent rescues for his own amusement, and that he additionally threw Mitsuo into the TV world himself in order to ensure the "game" did not end prematurely; his claims are dismissed by the party as the rantings of a madman. After fighting Adachi, he is controlled by Ameno-sagiri, who reveals that the fog is harmful to people and will eventually cause humanity to fall into a permanent state of ignorance and transform into Shadows. Upon his defeat, he agrees to lift the fog, congratulating the party on their resolve. Defeated, the wounded Adachi agrees to assume responsibility for his actions and is arrested.

The game moves forward to the day before Yu must travel home. If the player returns to the Dojima residence, the game ends with the "normal" ending, in which the party sends Yu off as he departs Inaba. Alternatively, should the player decline doing so and instead visit the party's usual reunion spot, the characters reunite and decide to investigate the unexplained origins of the Midnight Channel to end the case for good, setting the route for the original game's "true" ending. Yu confronts a gas station attendant encountered at the start of the game, who reveals herself to be Izanami-no-Okami, the "conductor" behind the game's events. The cause of the recurring fog is established as an attempt to create a world of illusion by merging the TV world with the human world, all for the "sake" of humanity. The group tracks Izanami down within the TV world and battle her, but is at first unable to win; the defeated Yu is given strength by the bonds he has forged with those around him, and with this power awakens a new Persona—Izanagi-no-Okami—which he uses to defeat Izanami. In doing so, the fog in each world is lifted, and the TV world is restored to its original form. The party sends Yu off the following day, and the game concludes with a post-credits scene depicting the group resolving to remain friends forever, as Yu examines a group photo of himself and the rest of the Team.

==== Persona 4 Golden ====
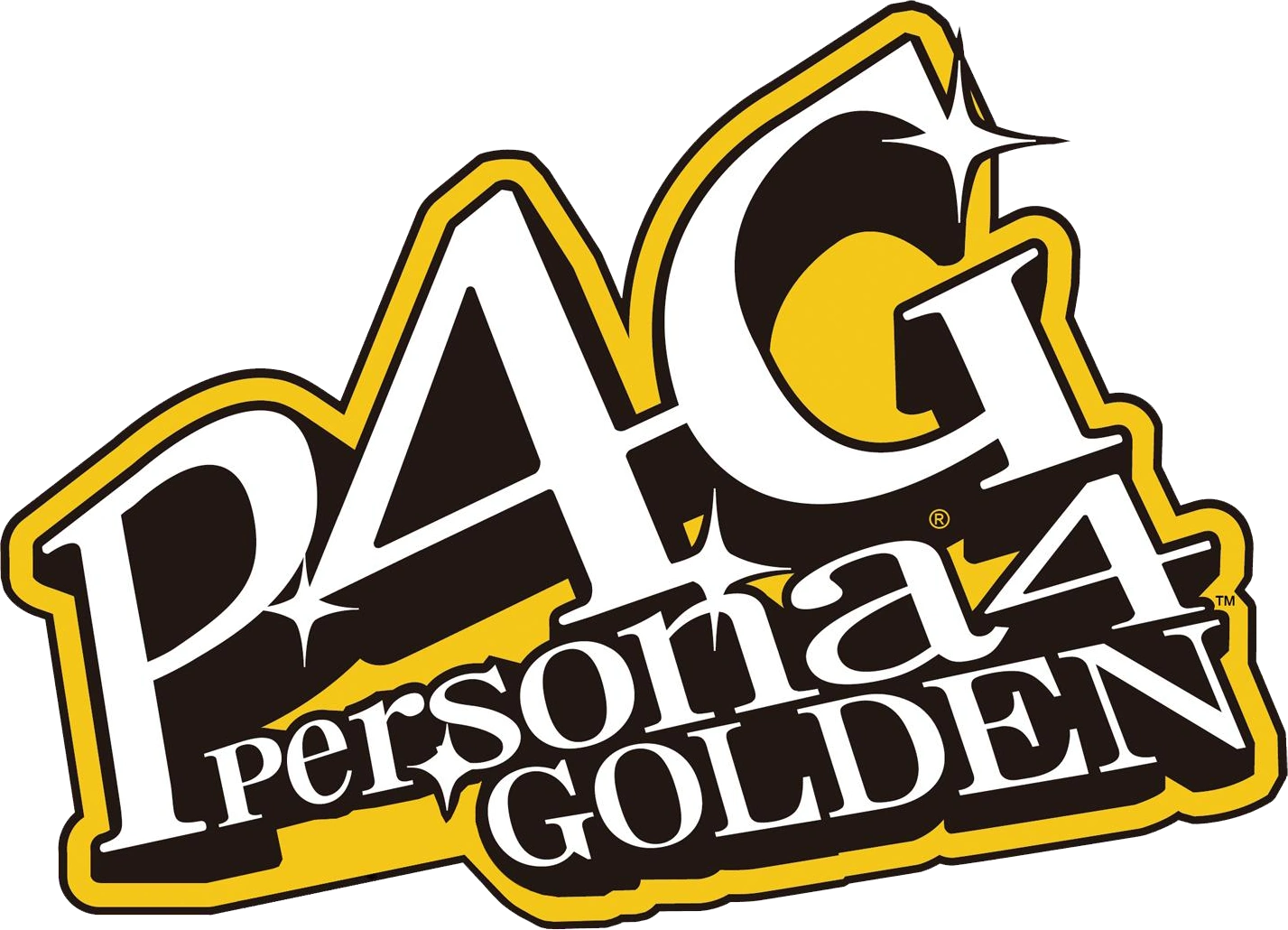
Persona 4 Golden logo

Persona 4 Golden adds two new Social Links to the game; Adachi and Golden exclusive character Marie, a mysterious girl who becomes an assistant in the Velvet Room and wishes to uncover her lost memories. If the player advances Adachi's Social Link to a certain level, they are given the choice to withhold his identity as the killer from the rest of the Investigation Team, thus leaving the mystery unsolved and resulting in the "accomplice" ending. On Yu's final day in Inaba, he may choose to visit Adachi and destroy a crucial piece of evidence related to the case. Adachi then blackmails Yu, threatening to have him arrested for destroying evidence if he does not answer his calls. The game's ending then plays out the same as the normal ending, but after the credits, Yu passes by Adachi at a level crossing. He clutches his phone in his hand as a smirk forms on Adachi's face.

After the Investigation Team defeats Ameno-sagiri, Marie disappears from the Velvet Room; if Marie's social link has been maxed out, Margaret promises to find her for Yu. The Investigation Team decide to take a skiing trip together, during which time they stumble upon a cabin with a TV inside. The TV turns out to be a portal to the Hollow Forest, where Marie has fled to. With the Hollow Forest on the verge of collapsing, the Investigation Team rushes to save her; if they fail to do so, Marie disappears from their memories. If they succeed, they find Marie, who reveals that she is Kusumi-no-Okami, created to act as a spy for Ameno-sagiri in order to learn what humanity wished for; with Ameno-sagiri defeated, the fog has now been absorbed into her body. Marie's plan is to kill herself so that the fog will not spread over the world again, but the Investigation Team refuses to allow her to die, defeating her and freeing her from the fog's control.

If the Investigation Team both rescued Marie and defeated Izanami-no-Okami, the player obtains the "Golden" ending, (Note: It is possible to get the original game's true ending in Golden by defeating Izanami without having rescued Marie; likewise, it is possible to save Marie but get the normal ending, if the player returned to the Dojima residence during Yu's final day in Inaba, therefore not facing Izanami.) in which Marie realizes that she is actually Izanami-no-Mikoto, the true form of the goddess Izanami, who originally wished to both protect humanity and grant its wishes, but as people changed and stopped wishing for truth, her wishes splintered into her and Izanami-no-Okami. With Kunino-sagiri, Ameno-sagiri, and Izanami-no-Okami fused with her, she becomes whole again and disappears from the Velvet Room for good. After the events of the original game's true ending, the Golden ending skips to an epilogue set in late August, five months after Yu's departure, as he returns to Inaba for the summer. (Note: Persona 4's spin-off sequels Persona 4 Arena and Persona 4 Arena Ultimax take place roughly two months after Yu's departure from Inaba, and therefore before the epilogue featured in the Golden ending; another spin-off sequel, Persona 4: Dancing All Night, is set a month after the epilogue.) He reunites with his friends, who have all changed since the last time they all met. During a surprise party with his friends, Ryotaro, and Nanako, Yu discovers, among others, that Namatame is running for mayor in order to atone for his previous actions, that Adachi has become a model prisoner, and that Marie has a new identity as a popular TV anchor presenting the weather, which she seemingly is able to control. At Nanako's suggestion, everyone gives Yu a formal but joyful welcome "home"; as they chastise Kanji for saying something different from what everyone else says, Yu smiles brightly. The game ends showing a brand new group picture of Yu and his friends, including Marie, all smiling together.

== Development ==
According to the game director Katsura Hashino, while "ideas [had been] thrown around earlier", development on Persona 4 in Japan did not begin until after the release of Persona 3. The development team consisted of the team from Persona 3 and new hires which included fans of Persona 3. Atlus intended to improve both the gameplay and story elements of Persona 3 for the new game, to ensure it was not seen as a "retread" of its predecessor. Hashino said that "to accomplish that, we tried to give the players of Persona 4 a definite goal and a sense of purpose that would keep motivating them as they played through the game. The murder mystery plot was our way of doing that." The plot of Persona 4 was "greatly inspired", according to Hashino, by mystery novelists such as Sir Arthur Conan Doyle, Agatha Christie, and Seishi Yokomizo. Persona 4 was officially unveiled in the Japanese gaming magazine Famitsu in March 2008. An article in the issue detailed the game's murder mystery premise, rural setting, and new weather forecast system. The game's North American release date was announced at the 2008 Anime Expo in Los Angeles, California. Atlus would not make an add-on disc or epilogue for Persona 4, as had been done with Persona 3 FES. Persona 4 allowed players full control of characters in battle. This was due to negative comments from players about most of the player team in Persona 3 being controlled by the game's AI. The amount of data the team ended up incorporating around school life, character relationships and spoken character dialogue was so large that there were fears it would not fit onto a single disc. The anime cutscenes were produced by Studio Hibari.

The design of Inaba is based on a town on the outskirts of Mount Fuji. Its rural design was a source of conflict between Persona 4's developers, as "each staff member had their own image of a rural town", according to director Katsura Hashino. The entire staff went "location hunting" to determine Inaba's design. Inaba does not represent "a country town that has tourist attractions", but rather a non-notable, "'nowhere' place". Hashino described the town as being "for better or for worse... a run-of-the-mill town". Unlike other role-playing games, which may have large worlds for the player to explore, Persona 4 mostly takes place in Inaba. This reduced development costs, and enabled Atlus "to expand other portions of the game" in return. A central setting also allows players to "sympathize with the daily life that passes in the game". To prevent the setting from becoming stale, the development team established a set number of in-game events to be created to "keep the game exciting". The choice of Japanese mythical figures for the characters' Personas as opposed to the Graeco-Roman deities used in earlier games was directly inspired by the new setting. The appearances of Personas were based on the characters' personalities. The design team had a good deal of creative freedom while creating Personas, because although Japanese deities have well-defined character traits, their appearances are traditionally unspecified. The Shadows were created by Hashino without much outside consultation, although he had help from female staff for female Shadow selves.

Despite living in the countryside, the characters of Persona 4 were designed to look and sound "normal" and like "modern high-schoolers", according to lead localization editor Nich Maragos. Initially, he wrote the game's cast as being "more rural than was really called for". "The characters aren't really hicks... They just happen to live in a place that's not a major metropolitan area." While interviewing members of Persona 4's development team, 1UP.com editor Andrew Fitch noted that the characters from the city – Yosuke and the protagonist – have "more stylish" hair than the other characters. Art director Shigenori Soejima used hair styles to differentiate between characters from the city versus the country. "With Yosuke in particular, I gave him accessories, such as headphones and a bicycle, to make it more obvious that he was from the city."

=== Localization ===
As with Persona 3, the localization of Persona 4 was handled by Yu Namba and Nich Maragos of Atlus USA. In addition, there were four translators and two further editors. The Social Links were divided equally between the translators and editors. During localization of the game, character's names were altered for the international audience for familiarity, including Kuma being renamed Teddie. A similar change was done for Rise Kujikawa's stage name, "Risechie" (りせちー, Risechī) in Japan, to "Risette". Nanba also explained the change from "Community" to "Social Link", regarding the gameplay mechanic, as "community" has a different meaning in English, whereas Igor in his speeches often refers to "society" and "bonds". Names were also altered for pun and other linguistic effect including dungeon items' names, such as the "Kae Rail" becoming the "Goho-M", as the item's use of returning the player to the entrance was taken to be "go home". Some Japanese cultural references that would not transfer were also removed, such as references to Kosuke Kindaichi. There were also some issues regarding the translation of the names of Yukiko, Kanji and Rise's dungeons, as the English names were made to fit the original Japanese graphics, and the "Void Quest" dungeon's graphics were specifically made to harken back to the Famicom. He also remarked on how popular the interpretations of Kanji's Shadow were in the west, and how it did not change how the character was seen by the other audience. A different change was that the main characters in the English dub referred to others members of the cast on a first-name basis, while the Japanese version differed in this regard. For the dub, the editors sometimes switched between first-name and last-name referral for dramatic effect.

Atlus's senior project manager Masaru Nanba commented it was decided that "Shin Megami Tensei" was to be kept in the title of Persona 3 and Persona 4, as it was believed that they were part of the same series as Shin Megami Tensei III: Nocturne; however, the "Shin Megami Tensei" title was omitted from both Persona 4 Golden and Persona 4 Arena, as it would have been much too long. Similarly, Persona 4: The Ultimate in Mayonaka Arena and Persona 4: The Golden were shortened to the previously stated titles. As with Persona 3, the honorifics used in the Japanese voice track were retained in the English dub, despite proving contentious among series fans. This was done as part of an intended trend to remain faithful to the original source material. The pronunciations of honorifics, along with the sounds of names, were a point that was carefully considered by the localization team and it took a while for the English cast to get used to them. A member of the English dub that also appeared in Persona 3 was Yuri Lowenthal. Though he had dubbed characters in Persona 3, Namba wanted him to have a larger part. His role as Yosuke ended up featuring 1000 more lines of dialogue than the other major characters. Important roles for the localization team were Teddie and Rise, as they would be the party's supports. Another element in the English script was that the use of swear words was increased over Persona 3: the first draft featured very strong language which was cut as it did not seem suited. The character Kanji was given a lot of swearing in his dialogue, due to his volatile nature. The use of swearing was carefully considered depending on the emotional situation.

=== Music ===
The game's original score was primarily composed, arranged, and produced by Shoji Meguro. The soundtrack features songs with vocals by Shihoko Hirata, whom Meguro felt was able to meet the range of emotion needed for the soundtrack, with the lyrics being written by Reiko Tanaka. Meguro was given a rough outline of the game's plot and worked on the music in the same manner and simultaneously with the development of the story and spoken dialog, starting with the overall shape of the songs and eventually working on the finer details. According to Meguro, the songs "Pursuing My True Self" and "Reach Out to the Truth" were composed to reflect the inner conflicts of the game's main characters; the former song, used as the opening theme, helped to set an understanding of the characters' conflicts, while the latter, used in battle sequences, emphasized the "strength of these characters to work through their internal struggles." The "Aria of the Soul" theme used in the Velvet Room, a concept common to all the Persona games, remained relatively unchanged, with Meguro believing "the shape of the song had been well-defined" from previous games. Composers Atsushi Kitajoh and Ryota Kozuka also contributed music for the game. Kitajoh, who had previously written music for Atlus with Growlanser VI and Trauma Center: New Blood, contributed four themes to Persona 4, while Kozuka wrote the "Theme of Junes".

Persona 4's two-disc soundtrack was released in Japan by Aniplex on July 23, 2008. The soundtrack was also released in North America. The side A of the soundtrack is the bonus disc packaged with each game, while side B of the soundtrack was part of Amazon.com's exclusive Persona 4 Social Link Expansion Pack. Similarly to Persona 3, a "Reincarnation" album, titled Never More, was released in Japan on October 26, 2011, featuring full length cuts of the game's vocal tracks and extended mixes of some of the instrumental tracks. Never More made it to the top of both the Oricon Weekly Album Charts and Billboard's Japan Top Albums chart for the week of its release, selling nearly 27,000 copies.

=== Release ===
Persona 4 was released in Japan on July 10, 2008 with a The Best version released on August 5, 2010. The Korean version was released by Sony Computer Entertainment Korea on October 31, 2008. The game was released in North America on December 9, 2008, with a soundtrack CD with select tracks from the game.

== Reception ==
Reception

Aggregate score
Aggregator	Score
Metacritic	PS2: 90/100; Vita: 93/100; PC: 87/100; PS4: 86/100; XSXS: 89/100; NS: 90/100

Review scores
Publication	Score
1Up.com	PS2: A+ VITA: A
Edge	9/10
Famitsu	PS2: 33/40; VITA: 35/40
GamePro	5/5
GameSpot	9/10
GameTrailers	9.3/10
GameZone	8.7/10
Hardcore Gamer	4.5/5
IGN	9/10
Nintendo Life	9/10
Nintendo World Report	8/10
Push Square	9/10
X-Play	4/5
Wired	10/10

Persona 4 received critical acclaim from game critics upon release. Jeff Gerstmann of Giant Bomb described it as "one of the best times I've had with video games, whether I was playing by myself or watching someone else play it." Famitsu pointed out that while "there isn't much new from the last game", it favored the changes over the battle system, where the pacing "is quick so it doesn't get to be a pain", and the ability to control party members "makes play that much easier". IGN on the other hand noted that "the pacing can be somewhat off", and "some things feel repurposed or unaffected from previous games", while praising the game as an "evolution of the RPG series, and an instant classic". It also noted that the soundtrack can be "a bit repetitive". RPGFan's Ryan Mattich recommended Persona 4 as "one of the best RPG experiences of the year", noting that "among the cookie-cutter sequels and half-hearted remakes", the game is "a near flawless example of the perfect balance between 'falling back on what works' and 'pushing the genre forward'." 1UP.com's Andrew Fitch summarized Persona 4 as "some of this decade's finest RPG epics", although the reviewer criticized its "slight loading issues" and the time spent "waiting for the plot to advance". GameTrailers stated that it is an exception to the rule of the Japanese role-playing genre, and that it stands out of any other JRPG, including its predecessor, Persona 3. Wired pointed out that while the graphics are not up to par with those of the Xbox 360 or PlayStation 3, "the clever art style makes up for that". It also praised the game's soundtrack as "excellent, especially the battle music".

The game's setting garnered mixed reactions. IGN labeled Persona 4 as "a murder mystery set against the backdrop of familiar Persona 3 elements", and while this element adds "an interesting twist" to the dungeon crawl and social simulation gameplay, it also causes the plot to "slow down or suffer". Hyper's Tim Henderson commended the game for "willfully embellish[ing] absurd urban legends and other ideas with such assured consistency that the resulting whole is unshakabl[y] coherent". However, he criticized it for the narrative's sluggish pace and for how he felt the game is "lacking in elaborate set-pieces". 1UP.com called Persona 4 a "stylish murder mystery", the comparison given being a "small-town Scooby-Doo" adventure.

The game is also noted for a portion of its story revolving around sexual themes. One of the playable characters given attention by reviewers is Kanji, who is considered to be one of the first characters in a mainstream video game to struggle with their sexual orientation, and Atlus has been commended for the inclusion of that character. Atlus USA has stated that they left Kanji's sexual preferences ambiguous and up to the player; however, there has been no word from developer Atlus Japan concerning the matter. According to Dr. Antonia Levi, author of Samurai from Outer Space: Understanding Japanese Animation, the questioning of Kanji's sexuality in the script is a "comment on homosexuality in a greater Japanese social context", in which "the notion of 'coming out' is seen as undesirable ... as it necessarily involves adopting a confrontational stance against mainstream lifestyles and values". Brenda Brathwaite, author of Sex in Video Games, thought it "would have been amazing if they would have made a concrete statement that [Kanji] is gay", but was otherwise "thrilled" with the treatment of the character and the game's representation of his "inner struggles and interactions with friends".

The PlayStation 4 and Xbox Series X/S ports of Persona 4 Golden have received "generally favorable reviews", while the Switch version has received "universal acclaim", according to Metacritic.

=== Sales ===
Persona 4 topped sales charts on its initial release in Japan, selling 193,000 copies within a week. The PS2 version went on to sell 358,899 copies in Japan. In North America, Persona 4 was the highest-selling PlayStation 2 game on Amazon.com for two consecutive weeks. A soundtrack disc was included in the North American and European releases of Persona 4, containing a selection of tracks from the full soundtrack released in Japan. Amazon exclusively sold the Persona 4 "Social Link Expansion Pack", which included an additional soundtrack disc, a t-shirt, a 2009 calendar, and a plush doll of the character Teddie. It was re-released as a PlayStation 2 Classic for the PlayStation 3 in April 2014.

The Japanese release of Persona 4 Golden on the PS Vita sold 324,357 physical copies and 21,020 digital copies, adding up to 704,276 copies sold for the PS2 and Golden (Vita) versions in Japan. Worldwide, Persona 4 Golden ultimately shipped over 1.5 million copies on the Vita. The 2020 Windows release of Persona 4 Golden on Steam also became a success, having sold over 500,000 units worldwide in less than a month. Sega stated that its sales were much stronger than expected and that they would continue to promote porting older games of theirs to PC. On June 30, 2021, Atlus announced that the PC version of Persona 4 Golden had reached 1 million units sold, bringing Persona 4 Golden sales to 2.5 million copies sold worldwide for the Vita and PC platforms.

=== Awards ===
Persona 4 was awarded the "PlayStation 2 Game Prize" in the Famitsu Awards 2008, voted by readers of Famitsu. It was also recognized by the Computer Entertainment Supplier's Association as one of the recipients for the "Games of the Year Award of Excellence" in the Japan Game Awards 2009. The game was given the award for its "high quality of work", "excellent story, automatically generated dungeons and impressive background music". It won the Award for Excellence at the 2009 Japan Game Awards. In 2013, GamesRadar ranked it fifth "best videogame stories ever", saying its "greatest strength comes from pacing". In 2015, GamesRadar named Persona 4 Golden the 53rd best game ever on its "The 100 best games ever" list. In that same year, USgamer placed the game fifth on its "The 15 Best Games Since 2000" list. In 2023, Time Extension included the game on their "Best JRPGs of All Time" list.

== Legacy ==
Costumes based on the Yasogami High uniforms, accompanied by music from the game, are available in Persona 5, Persona 3 Reload, and Metaphor: ReFantazio, all as purchasable DLC.

=== Other releases ===
==== Persona 4 Golden ====
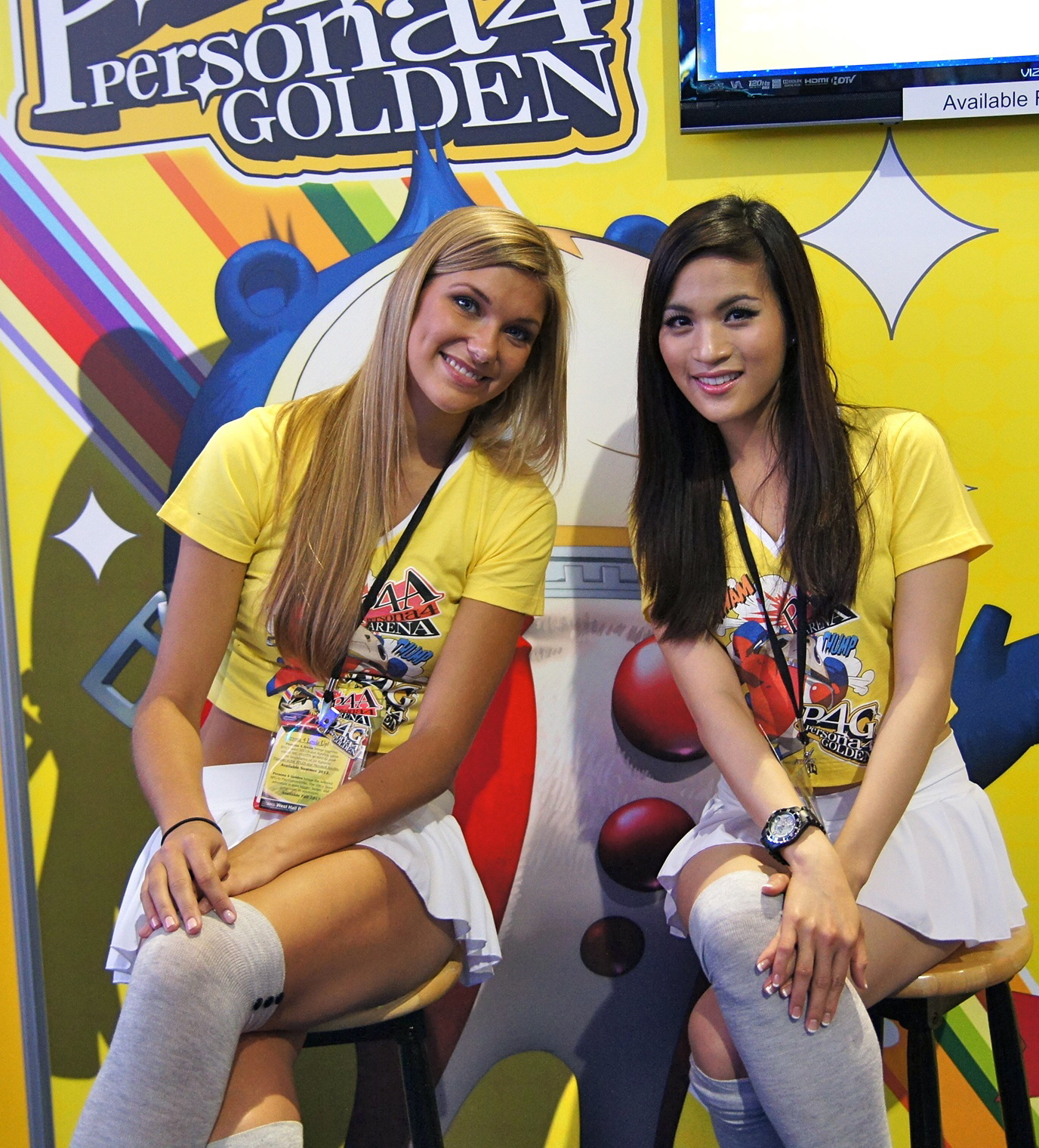
Persona 4 Golden booth at E3 2012

Persona 4 Golden, released in Japan as Persona 4: The Golden, was announced in August 2011 as a port of Persona 4 for the portable PlayStation Vita. It was originally planned by Atlus to be a PlayStation Portable title, similar to Persona 3 Portable, which would have required removing some of the features of the PlayStation 2 game. However, the Vita provided sufficient resources that allowed Atlus to expand the game. It is an expanded version of the PlayStation 2 title, adding new features and story elements to the game. A new character named Marie was added to the story. Additional Personas, character outfits, and expanded spoken lines and anime cutscenes are included as well as two new Social Links for Marie and Tohru Adachi. The game supports the wireless networking features of the Vita, allowing a player to call in help from other players to help in dungeon battles. Another new feature is a garden that produces items the player can use in the various dungeons. The game was released in Japan on June 14, 2012. Persona 4 Golden was also the first game in the series to be released in traditional Chinese.

The release of Persona 4 Golden resulted in the surge of sales of PlayStation Vitas. During its debut week, the game sold 137,076 units in Japan. Media Create stated that the game's outstanding sales that surpassed the debuts of other titles from Persona series may be due to the exposure the Persona 4 game has had in other forms of media. As of mid-July 2012, the game had sold 193,412 units in Japan. The game was the eighth most purchased digital Vita game on the Japanese PlayStation Network in 2013. As of April 2014, the game shipped 350,000 copies in Japan, and over 700,000 copies were shipped worldwide as of December 2013. A soundtrack was released in Japan on June 27, 2012, consisting of a single disc of 15 tracks composed by Meguro and Atsushi Kitajoh.

Persona 4 Golden was released in North America on November 20, 2012. A special 10,000 copies were also released on November 20, 2012, as the "Solid Gold Premium Edition". NIS America released the game in Europe on February 22, 2013. It was also released for Windows on June 13, 2020. It included some additional features, such as the Japanese voiceovers and minor graphical enhancements. Ports of Golden for Nintendo Switch, PlayStation 4, Xbox One, and Xbox Series X/S were released on January 19, 2023.

==== Remake ====
Persona 4 Revival is an upcoming remake of Persona 4 Golden in the same style as Persona 3 Reload, which brought improved graphics and presentation and other quality of life features that were introduced with Persona 5. It was announced in June 2025 for PlayStation 5, Xbox Series X/S, and Windows. Persona 4 Revival will be released on February 18, 2027.

=== Spin-offs ===
A fighting game sequel, Persona 4 Arena, known in Japan as Persona 4: The Ultimate in Mayonaka Arena, was developed by Arc System Works, the company known for creating the Guilty Gear and BlazBlue series, and released in 2012 for arcades, PlayStation 3 and Xbox 360. As with the anime, the protagonist is named Yu Narukami. Aigis, Mitsuru, Elizabeth, and Akihiko from Persona 3 are also featured in the game. Set two months following the True Ending of the original game, the members of the Investigation Team are pulled back into the television and forced into a fighting tournament called the "P-1 Grand Prix" hosted by General Teddie. A sequel, Persona 4 Arena Ultimax, was released in Japanese arcades in November 2013, for PlayStation 3 and Xbox 360 in late 2014, and for Nintendo Switch, PlayStation 4, and Windows in 2022. Taking place a day after the events of Arena, the Investigation Team must defeat their Shadows in a new tournament, the "P-1 Climax", in order to rescue the captive Shadow Operatives and stop the spread of a mysterious red fog engulfing Inaba. The game adds seven playable characters from Persona 3 and Persona 4 Golden, as well as a new playable antagonist, Sho Minazuki.

Persona Q: Shadow of the Labyrinth is a dungeon-crawler RPG developed for the Nintendo 3DS, which features characters from both Persona 3 and Persona 4, as well as gameplay elements from the Etrian Odyssey series. Set midway through the events of Persona 4, the Investigation Team is pulled into an alternate version of Yasogami High and must work with the members of SEES to find a means of escape. The game was released in Japan on June 5, 2014, North America on November 25, 2014, and Europe on November 28, 2014. Persona Q2: New Cinema Labyrinth is a dungeon-crawler released on the 3DS as a sequel to Persona Q. The game features the Investigation Team, alongside the main casts of Persona 3 and Persona 5, finding themselves trapped and lost in a movie theater. The game was released in Japan on November 29, 2018.

Persona 4: Dancing All Night is a rhythm game developed by Atlus for the PlayStation Vita, featuring music from the Persona series. The game takes place half a year following the events of Persona 4, as the Investigation Team look into a mysterious "Midnight Stage", which is abducting girls from Rise's idol group. The game was released in Japan on June 25, 2015, with a PlayStation 4 release occurring in 2018.

== Other media ==
- Other Persona 4 media
- Manga
- Written by: Shūji Sogabe
- Published by: ASCII Media Works
- English publisher: Udon Entertainment
- Magazine: Dengeki Black Maoh
- Original run: September 19, 2008 – March 27, 2019
- Volumes: 13
- Light novel

Persona x Detective Naoto
- Written by: Natsuki Mamiya
- Illustrated by: Kiyotaka Haimura
- Published by: ASCII Media Works
- Imprint: Dengeki Bunko
- Published: June 8, 2012
- Manga

Persona 4: The Magician
- Written by: Shiichi Kukura
- Published by: ASCII Media Works
- Imprint: Dengeki Comics
- Magazine: Persona Magazine
- Original run: December 8, 2011 – July 6, 2012
- Volumes: 1
- Manga

Persona x Detective Naoto
- Written by: Mamiya Natsuki
- Illustrated by: Satoshi Shiki
- Published by: ASCII Media Works
- Magazine: Dengeki Maoh
- Original run: November 27, 2012 – December 27, 2014
- Other
- Persona 4: The Animation (2011 TV anime); Persona 4: The Animation -Factor of Hope- (anime film); Persona 4: The Golden Animation (2014 TV anime)

=== Merchandise ===
With the release of Persona 4, Atlus has also produced a line of merchandise, including action figures, published materials, toys and clothes. Atlus collaborated with the Japanese publishing company Enterbrain to publish the game's two strategy guides, an artbook detailing character and setting designs, as well a fan book called Persona Club P4 which included official artwork, fan art, as well as interviews with the design staff. Most items were only released in Japan, while other Japanese third-party manufacturers also produced figurines and toys. The action figures include a 1/8 scale PVC figurine of Yukiko Amagi as well as Teddie and Rise Kujikawa, produced by Alter. Licensed Atlus merchandise sold by Cospa includes Persona 4 t-shirts, tote bags, and the jacket and other accessories worn by the character Chie.

Udon released an English edition of Enterbrain's Persona 4: Official Design Works artbook which was released on May 8, 2012.

=== Manga ===
Persona 4 was also given a manga adaptation. It is written by Shūji Sogabe, the artist for Persona 3's manga, and started serialization in ASCII Media Works' Dengeki Black Maoh Volume 5 in September 2008. The first tankōbon volume was released on September 26, 2009, and 13 volumes have been released in total, with the final volume on March 27, 2019.

Shiichi Kukura also authored Persona 4 The Magician (ペルソナ4 The Magician), a manga that focuses on Yosuke Hanamura's life in Inaba before the game's start. Its only volume was released on August 27, 2012. A manga adaptation of the light novel Persona × Detective Naoto, illustrated by Satoshi Shiki, was serialized in Dengeki Maoh magazine from November 27, 2014.

=== Light novel ===
Natsuki Mamiya wrote a light novel titled Persona × Detective Naoto (ペルソナ×探偵NAOTO, Perusona × Tantei Naoto) that focuses on the character of Naoto Shirogane a year after the events of Persona 4. She is hired to investigate the disappearance of a childhood friend in Yagakoro City where she is partnered with Sousei Kurogami, a mechanized detective. With illustrations by Shigenori Soejima and Shuji Sogabe, the light novel was released by Dengeki Bunko on June 8, 2012, in Japan.

=== Anime ===
A 25-episode anime television adaptation of the game, produced by AIC A.S.T.A. and directed by Seiji Kishi, aired on MBS between October 6, 2011, and March 29, 2012. An additional 26th episode, featuring the story's true ending, was released in the 10th volume of Persona 4 on August 22, 2013. The series features most of the returning cast from the video game, whilst voice recordings for Igor were taken from the game as his actor, Isamu Tanonaka, died in January 2010. Aniplex released the series on DVD and Blu-ray Disc between November 23, 2011, and August 22, 2012, with the first volume containing a director's cut of the first episode and a bonus CD single. Sentai Filmworks licensed the series in North America, simulcasting it on Anime Network as it aired and releasing the series on DVD and Blu-ray in two collective volumes on September 18, 2012, and January 15, 2013, respectively. Like the Japanese version, the English dub retains many of the original voice actors from the English version of the game, although the Blu-ray Disc release omits the Japanese audio option. Kazé and Manga Entertainment released the series in the United Kingdom in three BD/DVD combi boxsets released between December 24, 2012, and July 22, 2013. A film recap of the series, titled Persona 4 The Animation -The Factor of Hope-, was released in Japanese theaters on June 9, 2012, featuring a condensed version of the story and new scenes of animation. A second anime adaptation based on Persona 4 Golden, titled Persona 4: The Golden Animation, was produced by A-1 Pictures and began airing on MBS' Animeism block in July 2014.

=== Stage production ===
A live stage production titled VisuaLive: Persona 4 took place from March 15–20, 2012. Shutaro Oku was credited for directing the game footage featured in the play, while the music was composed by Shunsuke Wada. Actors starring in the stage production include Toru Baba as the audience-named protagonist, Takahisa Maeyama as Yosuke Hanamura, Minami Tsukui as Chie Satonaka, Risa Yoshiki as Yukiko Amagi, Jyōji Saotome as Daisuke Nagase, Motohiro Ota as Kou Ichijo, and Masashi Taniguchi as Ryotaro Dojima, and Masami Ito as Tohru Adachi. Kappei Yamaguchi and Rie Kugimiya reprised their roles as Teddie and Rise in voice. Actresses for Naoto and Rise could not be cast at the time due to the stage play's production company limiting the number of actresses allowed to appear in the play. Following the announcement, Youichiro Omi was cast as Kanji Tatsumi on December 1, 2011. VisuaLive: Persona 4 chronicled the events of the game up until Kanji's inclusion into the party.

A second stage production, titled VisuaLive: Persona 4: The Evolution, chronicled the second half of the events of the story and took place from October 3–9, 2012. Additions to the cast include Yuriya Suzuki as Rise Kujikawa, Juria Kawakami as Naoto Shirogane, Yasuhiro Roppongi as Tarou Namatame, Shotaro Mamiya as Izanami, and Arisa Nakajima as Margaret. Yumi Sugimoto replaced Yoshiki as Yukiko Amagi.
