= Samurai from Outer Space =

1998 book by Antonia Levi

Samurai from Outer Space: Understanding Japanese Animation
- Cover for Samurai from Outer Space: Understanding Japanese Animation
- Author: Antonia Levi
- Language: English
- Subject: Manga
- Genre: Encyclopedia
- Publisher: Open Court Publishing Company
- Publication date: December 30, 1998
- Publication place: United States
- Media type: Print (Paperback)
- Pages: 180 pp (first edition)
- ISBN: 978-0-8126-9332-4

Samurai from Outer Space: Understanding Japanese Animation is a 1998 book written by Antonia Levi. The book was published in North America by Open Court Publishing Company on December 30, 1998.

== Reception ==
Anime News Network's Mikhail Koulikov commends the book for its "accessible introduction to looking at anime from an academic perspective" but criticizes it for being "limited in scope, sloppy in execution, and badly dated". Animation World Magazine's Fred Patten commends the book for "breaking new ground" by delivering "the first detailed discussion of the popular-culture sociology of anime". However, he criticizes the book for mis-dating, "a couple of minor titles are consistently misspelled" and "the color plates are beautiful but notably pixillated [sic], as though printed from enlarged color faxes or "video screen captures" rather than from clear film transparencies".
