= Yu Yu Hakusho: The Movie =

1993 Japanese animated film

- Advertisement for the film

Japanese name
- Kanji: 幽☆遊☆白書
Transcriptions
- Revised Hepburn: Yū Yū Hakusho
- Directed by: Noriyuki Abe
- Written by: Yukiyoshi Ohashi
- Based on: Yu Yu Hakusho by Yoshihiro Togashi
- Produced by: Ken Hagino
- Starring: Nozomu Sasaki; Megumi Ogata; Nobuyuki Hiyama; Sanae Miyuki; Shigeru Chiba
- Music by: Yusuke Honma
- Production company: Studio Pierrot
- Distributed by: Toei Company
- Release date: July 10, 1993
- Running time: 30 minutes
- Country: Japan
- Language: Japanese

Yu Yu Hakusho: The Movie (Japanese: 幽☆遊☆白書, Hepburn: Yū Yū Hakusho), also known as The Golden Seal, is a 1993 Japanese anime film based on the YuYu Hakusho manga series created by Yoshihiro Togashi. The 30-minute film was directed by Noriyuki Abe and produced by Studio Pierrot. It was released theatrically in Japan on July 10, 1993 at the seasonal Toei Anime Fair. The film was dubbed into English by Anime Works and Animaze and released on VHS on June 9, 1998 and on a single DVD with Ninku: The Movie on January 30, 2001. Funimation Entertainment later released the film to DVD, along with the Eizou Hakusho OVAs, on December 13, 2011 as Yu Yu Hakusho: The Movie & Eizou Hakusho, featuring a new English dub with their original voice cast from the anime television series.

A Filipino dub titled Ghost Fighter: The Next Mission released by Regal Entertainment in the Philippines.

Like the television series, it features the songs "Smile Bomb" and "Sayonara Bye Bye" by Matsuko Mawatari (Sarah White and Stephanie Nadolny in Funimation's English version) for its opening and closing credits respectively.

== Plot ==
While vacationing, Koenma is kidnapped by a pair of demons known as Koashura and Garuga, who demand the possession of Lord Enma's coveted "Golden Seal". Botan finds Yusuke Urameshi and Kazuma Kuwabara on their summer vacation as well, and asks for their assistance in Koenma's rescue.

== Voice cast ==
Character	Actor		
Character	Japanese	English	
Character	Japanese	Media Blasters, 1998	Funimation, 2011
Yusuke Urameshi	Nozomu Sasaki	Jonathan Fahn (as Jonathan Charles)	Justin Cook
Kazuma Kuwabara	Shigeru Chiba	Lex Lang	Christopher Sabat
Kurama	Megumi Ogata	David Hayter (as Sean Barker)	John Burgmeier
Hiei	Nobuyuki Hiyama	Kirk Thornton (as Sparky Thornton)	Chuck Huber
Botan	Sanae Miyuki	Lia Sargent	Cynthia Cranz
Koenma	Mayumi Tanaka	Brianne Siddall (as Jetta E. Bumpy)	Sean Teague
Garuga/Yasha	Takeshi Aono	Kevin Seymour (as Dougary Grant)	Christopher Ayres
Koashura	Rica Matsumoto	Julie Maddalena (as Julie Kliewer)	Greg Ayres
George Saotome	Tomomichi Nishimura	Robert Martin Klein (as Bob Marx)	Kent Williams
Winged Demon	Mitsuaki Madono	Doug Stone	J. Michael Tatum
Tree Demon	Masami Suzuki	Milton James (as Richard Barnes)	Jeff Johnson
Kotennyo	Yuri Shiratori	Wendee Lee	Kate Bristol

== Release ==
AnimeWorks released an English dubbed version of the half-hour film on VHS in both English-dubbed and subtitled formats on May 5, 1998, and on DVD on January 30, 2001.

== Reception ==
According to Martin Ouelette of Protoculture Addicts, the movie did little to satisfy fans of the YuYu Hakusho series during its original release due to its short running time. Reviewing the Funimation release, Carl Kimlinger of Anime News Network gave the subtitled version a "B+", the English dub a straight "B", and called the story disposable stating the film is more focused on "having fun with its theatrical budget".
