= Yu Yu Hakusho the Movie: Poltergeist Report =

1994 Japanese animated film

- Theatrical release poster

Japanese name
- Kanji: 幽☆遊☆白書 冥界死闘篇 炎の絆
Transcriptions
- Revised Hepburn: Yū Yū Hakusho: Meikai Shitō Hen – Honō no Kizuna
- Directed by: Masakatsu Iijima
- Written by: Hiroshi Hashimoto; Sukehiro Tomita; Yukiyoshi Ohashi
- Based on: Yu Yu Hakusho by Yoshihiro Togashi
- Produced by: Haruo Sai; Ken Hagino; Naoji Hōnokidani
- Starring: Nozomu Sasaki; Megumi Ogata; Nobuyuki Hiyama; Sanae Miyuki; Shigeru Chiba
- Music by: Yusuke Honma
- Production company: Studio Pierrot
- Distributed by: Toho
- Release date: April 9, 1994
- Running time: 95 minutes
- Country: Japan
- Language: Japanese
- Box office: ¥3.3 million

Yu Yu Hakusho the Movie: Poltergeist Report, known in Japan as Yū Yū Hakusho: Meikai Shitō Hen - Honō no Kizuna (Japanese: 幽☆遊☆白書 冥界死闘篇 炎の絆; lit. 'Yu Yu Hakusho: Chapter of Underworld's Carnage - Bonds of Fire'), is a 1994 Japanese anime film based on the YuYu Hakusho manga series created by Yoshihiro Togashi. Directed by Masakatsu Iijima and produced by Studio Pierrot. Featuring the talents of Nozomu Sasaki, Megumi Ogata, Nobuyuki Hiyama, Sanae Miyuki, Shigeru Chiba, among others, the plot revolves around Yusuke Urameshi and his friends defending the Human World against inhabitants of a fourth plane of existence called the "Netherworld". The film was dubbed into English by Central Park Media, which released it on VHS on March 3, 1998, and on DVD on October 8, 2002.

The film was released to mixed critics with praise given to the animation and fight sequences but criticism being aimed towards its derivative plot or lack of.

== Plot ==
The story begins in the Spirit World, where the River Styx is overflowing, due to a tsunami. Koenma gives a mysterious item to Botan, and tells her to give it to Yusuke Urameshi, but Botan gets hurt badly and hides it instead. The storm was apparently caused by the forces of the Netherworld, which was banished into cold space ages ago by Lord Enma. Upon finding the wounded Botan and her friend Hinageshi, Yusuke has them taken to Genkai's temple where their friendly allies Kurama and Hiei join. To restore balance in the now flooded Spirit World and with Hinegashi's guidance, Yusuke and the others must track down five spots on Earth that contain a large amount of spiritual energy.

However, their mission is thwarted when the ruler of the Netherworld, Yakumo and his three demon gods decide to use the same energy to restore their place on Earth. The race begins to save the Spirit World, and now the Human World as well. Yakumo's group manage to seal the Spirit World and kidnaps Botan, wounding Genkai and their friends. Yusuke, Kuwabara, Kurama, Hiei and Hinageshi travel towards Yakumo's group to restore the balance.

A beserk Kurama kills the Demon posing as his old friend Kuronue, while Hiei tricks Raiko into brainwashing him only to reveal he is in control of himself and kills him. With Kuwabara having defeated the third Demon Majari, the group makes it to Yakumo. Yusuke faces Yakumo but is overpowered. As a result, Yusuke tries to take Botan's sealed item to increase his powers but loses control. Kuwabara, Kurama and Hiei join Yusuke to assist him to control the Demon Energy. Thanks to them, Yusuke manages to shoot a Reigun projectile that takes down Yakumo. Yakumo survives but Yusuke attacks him again with the Reigun, seemingly killing him in the process. In the aftermath, Hinageshi and the fighters find Botan has recovered.

== Voice cast ==
Character	Actor	
Character	Japanese	English
Yusuke Urameshi	Nozomu Sasaki	Rik Nagel
Kazuma Kuwabara	Shigeru Chiba	(dub: Kazuma Kuwahara) Cliff Lazenby
Botan	Sanae Miyuki	Kathleen McInerney
Koenma	Mayumi Tanaka	Eric Stuart
Kurama	Megumi Ogata	Chris Orbach (as Hideo Seaver)
Hiei	Nobuyuki Hiyama	James Stanley
Keiko Yukimura	Yuri Amano	Shannon Conley
Genkai	Hisako Kyoda	Caryl Marder
Yakumo	Hirotaka Suzuoki	Bruce Winant
Hinageshi	Chisa Yokoyama	Elisa Wain
Raiko	Nobuaki Fukuda	Peter Patrikios
Kuronue	Hochu Otsuka	Eric Stuart
Majari	Yuji Mitsuya	Jack Taylor
Yukina	Yuri Shiratori	Veronica Taylor
George Saotome	Tomomichi Nishimura	
Yoko Kurama	Shigeru Nakahara	Chris Orbach

== Release ==
The 95 minutes long film was released in theaters in Japan on April 9, 1994. It grossed ¥3.3 million in the Japanese box office. The film features the ending theme "Sayonara wa Iwanai" composed by JILL and sung by Personz.

The film was later dubbed into English by Central Park Media and Skypilot Entertainment and was released on VHS on March 3, 1998, and DVD on October 8, 2002. A DVD reprint was later issued by Central Park Media on January 31, 2006. The film was later released on Blu-ray as a part of the Yu Yu Hakusho: 25th Anniversary Box collection on July 27, 2018.

This full-length feature received its first English dubbed version by Central Park Media, which released it on VHS on March 3, 1998, and on DVD on October 8, 2002, under the name Yu Yu Hakusho the Movie: Poltergeist Report.

== Reception ==
Reviewing the 2002 DVD release, Allen Divers of Anime News Network gave the subtitled version a "B" and the dubbed version a "C". He noted that the film has all the action, drama and comedy that makes the TV series great, but with higher-quality animation and artwork due to a theatrical budget. Divers stated that the dub was well-done and close to the original Japanese, but said it was disappointing that a different English voice cast from the TV series was used. THEM Anime Reviews praised the film for its animated fight scenes but criticized its lack of narrative and how it does not do anything new to develop the main characters. In the book Anime Classics Zettai!: 100 Must-See Japanese Animation, the film is considered a major improvement to the first installment for its longer length, darker premise and impressive visuals. In the book Anime Classics Zettai!: 100 Must-See Japanese Animation, the film is noted for its impressive animation but a weak plot comparable to Silent Mobius and Sailor Moon instead.

The VHS version was the 31st-best selling video during its release week in North America. It fell to number 37 the following week and rose to number 34 the third week.
