= Level E =

Japanese manga series

- First tankōbon volume cover, featuring Prince Baka

レベルE (Reberu Ī)
- Genre: Science fiction comedy
- Manga
- Written by: Yoshihiro Togashi
- Published by: Shueisha
- Imprint: Jump Comics
- Magazine: Weekly Shōnen Jump
- Original run: October 2, 1995 – January 15, 1997
- Volumes: 3
- Anime television series
- Directed by: Toshiyuki Katō
- Produced by: Hatsuo Nara; Ken Hagino; Kōji Kajita
- Written by: Jukki Hanada
- Music by: Yang Bang-ean
- Studio: Studio Pierrot; David Production
- Licensed by: NA: Funimation
- Original network: TV Tokyo
- English network: US: Funimation Channel
- Original run: January 11, 2011 – April 5, 2011
- Episodes: 13
- icon

Level E (Japanese: レベル E, Hepburn: Reberu Ī) is a Japanese manga series written and illustrated by Yoshihiro Togashi. The plot follows the misadventures of alien Prince Baka Ki El Dogra, who crash-lands on Earth and forcibly begins living with high school student and baseball player Yukitaka Tsutsui. However, Prince Baka gradually realizes that he is targeted by aliens from other planets, and he uses his clever wits to somehow maintain world peace each time. Along with its short length and more realistic art style, the story of Level E focuses much more heavily on humor than Togashi's more famous series Yu Yu Hakusho and Hunter × Hunter.

Level E was serialized for sixteen chapters, released on a monthly basis, in Shueisha's shōnen manga magazine Weekly Shōnen Jump from 1995 to 1997. The chapters were collected in three tankōbon volumes. A 13-episode anime television series adaptation, directed by Toshiyuki Katō and produced by Studio Pierrot and David Production, aired on TV Tokyo in 2011.

== Plot ==
Earth has been populated by thousands of aliens from all over the galaxy. While all the other aliens are aware of their presence, it is a secret only from the Earthlings. Baka, the prince of the planet Dogra, crash lands on Earth and loses his memory. He forcibly moves in with Yukitaka Tsutsui, a first year high school student who had just moved out on his own. The normal life he once knew is quickly pulled away as he becomes the target of the prince's torment.

== Characters ==
Prince Baka (バカ王子, Baka-ōji; lit. 'stupid prince')
Voiced by: Daisuke Namikawa (Japanese); Vic Mignogna (English)
The effeminate-looking first prince of the planet Dogura. He has an exceptionally high IQ and has little interest other than using it to torment those around him for his own amusement. His real name is Baka Ki El Dogra (バカ = キ = エル・ドグラ, Baka Ki Eru Dogura), but everybody refers to him solely as Prince or Prince Baka.
Yukitaka Tsutsui (筒井 雪隆, Tsutsui Yukitaka)
Voiced by: Yoshimasa Hosoya (Japanese); Micah Solusod (English)
High school student and the Prince's roommate. Plays baseball. A former punk.
Miho Edogawa (江戸川 美歩, Edogawa Miho)
Voiced by: Satomi Akesaka (Japanese); Lindsay Seidel (English)
Yukitaka's next door neighbor and school mate. Miho's father is a researcher studying alien life on Earth. Has been taught to notice hidden cameras, tracking devices and secret guards.
Captain Craft (クラフト隊長, Kurafuto-taichō)
Voiced by: Takehito Koyasu (Japanese); Jason Douglas (English)
Captain of the Royal Guard Army. He is in his tenth year. His top priority is that of the Prince Baka's bodyguard. Fifth year guard, Sado, and first year guard, Colin, work under him.

== Production ==
Level E was written and illustrated by Yoshihiro Togashi, who had established himself as a prominent manga artist with YuYu Hakusho. When the decision was made to serialize Level E, Togashi had only created the first chapter. Because the story involved the protagonist as an alien changing each chapter, he titled the manga "Alien Crises". He quickly changed it to its final name after being told the former title was too explicit. After renting a videotape called Level 4, he affirmed to himself that he should name the series using the first English language letter of the word "alien". He was informed that the first letter was "A" and not "E", but he replied that he always associated the term with E.T. Togashi has stated that he is a fan of the horror genre of films and has cited visual effects designer H. R. Giger (of the Alien franchise) as a major influence. Togashi based the setting of Level E on his own hometown of Yamagata with close attention to detail. For the humor, Togashi took inspiration from the gag manga Gaki Deka.

== Media ==
=== Manga ===
Written and illustrated by Yoshihiro Togashi, Level E was serialized monthly in Shueisha's shōnen manga magazine Weekly Shōnen Jump from October 2, 1995, to January 15, 1997. A total of sixteen chapters were collected into three volumes tankōbon. The first was released on March 4, 1996, the second on October 3, 1996, and the third on May 1, 1997. In addition, Level E was re-released as part of the Shueisha Jump Remix series of magazine-style books, with two volumes being released in 2009. It was also re-published by Shueisha into two bunkoban volumes released on September 17, and October 15, 2010. Level E has been translated into Chinese, serialized in the magazine Formosa Youth, and released in volume format by Tong Li Publishing in the Republic of China (Taiwan). It was also published in Brazil by Editora JBC, in France by Kazé, and Spain by Planeta DeAgostini Comics.

| No. | Title | Release date | ISBN |
|---|---|---|---|
| 1 | An alien on the planet | March 4, 1996 | 4-08-872071-7 |
1. An alien on the planet; 2. Run after the man!; 3. Risky game!; 4. From the darkness; 5. Crime of nature...!
| 2 | Here comes color ranger!! | October 3, 1996 | 4-08-872072-5 |
6. Here come color ranger!!; 7. Dancing in the trap!!; 8. The crying game; 9. Game over...!?; 10. You're my darling!
| 3 | Full moon...! | May 1, 1997 | 4-08-872073-3 |
11. Love me tender; 12. Field of dreams!; 13. Escape from!!; 14. Boy meets girl; 15. Full moon...!; 16. Honeymoon...!

=== Anime ===
A 13-episode anime television series adaptation of Level E was produced by TV Tokyo, Studio Pierrot and David Production and directed by Toshiyuki Katō, with Jukki Hanada handling series scripts, Itsuko Takeda designing the characters and Yang Bang-ean composing the music. The series aired on TV Tokyo from January 11 to April 5, 2011. (Note: TV Tokyo listed the air dates for the series as Monday at 1:30 a.m., which is actually Tuesday at that time.) The opening theme song is "Cold Finger Girl" (コールドフィンガーガール, Kōrudo Fingā Gāru), performed by Chiaki Kuriyama, while the ending theme song is "(Yume): Mugennokanata" (｢夢｣〜ムゲンノカナタ〜; lit. 'Dream: Beyond Infinity'), performed by ViViD. Crunchyroll simulcast the series on its streaming website in other parts of the world one hour after each initial TV Tokyo airing. Funimation announced that it had licensed the series at Katsucon 2012. Aniplex collected the episodes on six DVD sets, released from February 23 to July 27, 2011. They included two or three episodes apiece, as well as extra features.

The anime sets the story in the modern era, with flat-screen TVs and smartphones, which were not available when the original manga was released, appearing in the story. All chapters except for the final chapter of the manga, "Honeymoon...!", were adapted. The narration was done by Fumihiko Tachiki.

| No. | Title | Directed by | Written by | Original release date |
|---|---|---|---|---|
| 1 | "An alien on the planet" | Toshiyuki Katō | Jukki Hanada | January 11, 2011 |
High school student and baseball player Yukitaka Tsutsui moves into his apartment, shocked that an alien named Prince Baka has already invited himself inside. Prince Baka explains that his escape pod crash-landed on Earth two nights ago. As further proof that he is an alien, Prince Baka even gives Yukitaka a controller to make the escape pod explode from a distance. Miho Edogawa swings by from next door and gives Yukitaka a welcoming gift. As the news later reports that there were no casualties, Yukitaka allows Prince Baka to stay overnight. After Prince Baka retrieves an orb seen on the news, Yukitaka witnesses him oozing blue blood. However, Prince Baka heals his wounds near a tree, causing it to bloom. The next day after Yukitaka has baseball practice, the police shows up at Yukitaka's apartment looking for Prince Baka. With Yukitaka playing it down, the police leaves after telling him that Prince Baka is wanted for murder. Prince Baka later shows Yukitaka a holographic image from the orb, an arthropod from the planet Jacqueline S known as a Clive, which is extremely adept in mimicry.
| 2 | "Run after the man" | Toshikazu Yoshizawa | Jukki Hanada | January 18, 2011 |
Prince Baka surprises Yukitaka by saying that the Clive is simply his pet and reflects on what he is as an alien. Captain Craft, Sado and Colin of the Royal Guard Army have landed on Earth with the sole mission of protecting Prince Baka. Miho stops by Yukitaka's apartment to check for hidden cameras. However, Prince Baka secretly escapes from his bedroom, much to Yukitaka's annoyance. Meanwhile, Captain Craft and Sado pass by monk Jinpachi Sakamoto in Konan Town to look for answers. Afterwards, Sado points out to Captain Craft that Earth is the only planet where the Diskunians coexist with the Ellerians. Colin has traced Prince Baka's distress signal to Yukitaka's apartment, while Yukitaka and Miho end up finding Prince Baka in a cafe wearing a different outfit. Prince Baka explains that he killed a thug named Lafferty in an alleyway, disposing the body in a trash can. Prince Baka, Yukitaka and Miho return to the apartment and encounter Captain Craft, Sado and Colin. When Prince Baka retrieves Lafferty's body inside the trash can, Sado realizes that Lafferty is of Diskunian origin.
| 3 | "Risky Game!" | Masahiro Mukai | Jukki Hanada | January 25, 2011 |
Lafferty immediately jumps out of the trash can and departs from the balcony after warning everyone in Yukitaka's apartment that his Diskunian brethren will come after Prince Baka. The Diskunians soon corner the apartment complex, with Jinpachi demanding that Prince Baka must be handed over to the Diskunians by sundown. Sado suggests Captain Craft to jog Prince Baka's memory, but this knocks Prince Baka unconscious. As soon as sundown approaches, Colin tries to access information about the Diskunians using the crystal data system within the orb, while Jinpachi orders the Diskunians to raid Yukitaka's apartment. However, the jig is up, and Captain Craft reveals that the infiltration was actually staged by Prince Baka himself. It is shown that Prince Baka kept a secret video diary of a mock rescue operation. When Prince Baka wakes up, Captain Craft, Sado and Colin chase him out of Yukitaka's apartment to their spaceship. The Diskunians ask Yukitaka for his autograph due to being baseball fans. Three months later, Yukitaka shows Miho a letter written by Prince Baka, saying that Earth is now part of Dogra's domain, thanks to his involvement.
| 4 | "From the DARKNESS" | Yasufumi Soejima | Jukki Hanada | February 1, 2011 |
In their shed, four classmates named Higashio, Itakura, Yamada and Nozaki secretly witness a girl named Yasuda being devoured by an unknown boy. The four of them soon list three possible suspects in their class. When Higashio does not show up to school the next day, Itakura, Yamada and Nozaki seek help from music store clerk Ungo Sakamoto. He gives them a business card addressed to Kyūshirō Yumeno, a detective who works at a rundown hospital. At the hospital, Yumeno explains to Itakura, Yamada and Nozaki that they saw an alien, which requires a large investigation fee. When Itakura goes missing several days later, Yamada and Nozaki finally contact Yumeno, giving up their parents' rings as payment and signing a contract. When Yamada and Nozaki find Higashio and Itakura in an isolated room, it turns out that Ungo tricked all of them into meeting Yumeno. Yumeno reveals that their lead suspect, Yamamoto, was the culprit, given that aliens do not leave behind fingerprints. Yumeno lets them go after showing them recorded footage of his incredible investigation. They happily share a box of fried chicken the following day. Surprisingly, Prince Baka was behind the production of this short film.
| 5 | "Here come Color ranger!!" | Yui Umemoto | Kazuyuki Fudeyasu | February 8, 2011 |
After school, five boys named Yoshiki Shimizu, Taiyo Akagawa, Kunimitsu Yokota, Osamu Momochi and Mayo Mayuzumi are suddenly kidnapped by Prince Baka against their wills. Prince Baka deems the five boys worthy of justice despite their excuses of everyday life. The next day, they all receive bracelets that transform them into color rangers. When Akagawa accidentally activates his red color ranger suit at school, Shimizu and Yokota carry him to the boys' restroom, crossing paths with homeroom teacher Tachibana. Akagawa tells Shimizu and Yokota that he saw Tachibana as an alien. Shimizu and Yokota are ordered to return to class when Tachibana enters, but they pull the fire alarm when Tachibana tries to confront Akagawa, in which Tachibana demands that they see her after school. In the classroom after school, all five color rangers meet using an instructional guide given by Prince Baka to learn about fighting techniques. As Tachibana finally shows up in her alien form, she realizes that the bracelets came from Prince Baka himself. Despite the fact that Tachibana is an assassin, her dream was to become a teacher. Sadly, the key to the bracelets is in the hands of Captain Craft.
| 6 | "Dancing in the trap!!" | Shigeru Kimiya | Kazuyuki Fudeyasu | February 15, 2011 |
With only Akagawa reaching level ten in training, the color rangers travel by train to prepare for a showdown against Captain Craft. Upon arrival at Captain Craft's "safe house", the color rangers are invited in for some watermelons. Captain Craft types to them that Prince Baka can eavesdrop through their bracelets, asking them to play along to make it sound like a fight. He secretly gives up the key, but the color rangers have no idea how to use it. With no other options left, Captain Craft, Sado and Colin team up to help the color rangers properly use the key to reveal their school crushes and unlock their bracelets. Nonetheless, only Akagawa and Momochi are unable to unlock their bracelets. On the following day at school, the color rangers are trapped in a role-playing game on the planet Calvary created by Prince Baka himself. Their mission is to go to the castle and defeat the Demon King. However, they decide that they must train to reach level thirty before going there. Meanwhile, Tachibana shows concern for the color rangers day and night. After awhile, the color rangers end up surpassing their expectations in reaching their levels.
| 7 | "Game over...!?" | Fumiaki Kōda | Kazuyuki Fudeyasu | February 22, 2011 |
At the castle, the color rangers encounter King Iidachi saying that the dark dragon knight General Luch, who serves directly under the Demon King, is determined to wed King Iidachi's daughter. He will offer his daughter's hand in marriage to anyone who can vanquish General Luch. Prince Baka is introduced as King Iidachi's daughter named Princess Apparel, much to the annoyance of the color rangers. Unfortunately, Prince Baka says that General Luch is at a much higher level than the color rangers. When General Luch enters the castle, Prince Baka tells the color rangers to head east to the Saint's Shrine in order to be safe from monsters, before he willingly departs with General Luch. Prince Baka manages to steal a rocket skateboard under General Luch's bed after some "bedroom role-play". The color rangers and Prince Baka each make it to the Saint's Shrine. The Demon King, a younger form of Prince Baka, approaches them with his desire to make Calvary a safe haven. The color rangers use a "golden hammer punch" to blast Prince Baka into outer space for being against this idea. Although the color rangers soon return to Earth, their quest on Calvary is not quite over.
| 8 | "You're my darling!" | Tetsuo Ichimura | Masashi Suzuki | March 1, 2011 |
Captain Craft, Sado and Colin discuss that Princess Saki of the Macbac Kingdom will be visiting Earth to search for a potential mate with the consequence that humankind will go extinct within a few generations. While Captain Craft, Sado and Colin are formally introduced to Princess Saki, it is shown that Prince Baka is busy collecting flora samples in a forest. Captain Craft, Sado and Colin escort Princess Saki with her two friends to a hotel so she can find a suitable mate there. At the hotel, a girl named Satomi leaves a boy named Mikihisa because their hotel room had separate beds. When Princess Saki and Mikihisa cross paths outside, it is double love at first sight, much to Captain Craft's frustration. Captain Craft tries to stretch the truth in order to prevent Princess Saki and Mikihisa from being together, but Saki's friends manage to outsmart Colin and allow Princess Saki to run away with Mikihisa. After failing to pursue Princess Saki and Mikihisa using snowmobiles, Captain Craft, Sado and Colin catch them at the end of a ride on an aerial lift. Captain Craft claims that Mikihisa is really a girl, based on his hotel sign-in sheet.
| 9 | "Love me tender" | Yukio Nishimoto | Masashi Suzuki | March 8, 2011 |
After Captain Craft explains that Mikihisa's first name is Kyōko and therefore female, Princess Saki sadly parts ways with Mikihisa. Princess Saki and her two friends leave Earth, much to Captain Craft's relief. However, Prince Baka returns from his travels, already aware that Princess Saki has recently visited Earth. After Prince Baka finds a listening device in Colin's hair, which Captain Craft immediately destroys, Prince Baka, Captain Craft, Sado and Colin realize that Mikihisa has left her hotel room, in which Prince Baka believes that Princess Saki plans to turn Mikihisa into a male. Captain Craft, Sado and Colin follow Mikihisa's snowmobile tracks deep in the woods, but they are too late when Mikihisa is abducted into Princess Saki's spaceship. Princess Saki injects an unknown virus into Mikihisa. When Mikihisa suddenly wakes up at her house the next day, Prince Baka, Captain Craft, Sado and Colin closely monitor any possible changes, since the four of them cannot inject a vaccine into Mikihisa. Several months later, Mikihisa and Princess Saki reunite under the cherry blossoms, but Prince Baka, Captain Craft, Sado and Colin only created a clone of Mikihisa in order to preserve humankind.
| 10 | "Boy meets girl" | Yoshimichi Hirai | Kazuyuki Fudeyasu | March 15, 2011 |
Tachibana announces at school that Shimizu will be moving to America with his family due to his father's job. The other four color rangers become upset since Shimizu will be leaving in two days. In the woods, Shimizu comes across an injured woman named Lorelei, who admits that she is a mermaid alien. She urges him to come back with help, despite his falling out with his friends. Shimizu brings the other color rangers back to the woods, but Lorelei is nowhere to be found. After the color rangers resolve their conflict, they begin their search for Lorelei and end up finding her in a lair. Surprisingly, she is treated as merchandise by three poachers. However, when Lorelei believes that Shylock, the leader of the poachers, will take her to her mermaid roommates, the color rangers instinctively attack the poachers to protect Lorelei. After the color rangers tie up the poachers, Shylock shockingly reveals that Lorelei's mermaid roommates were already sold and probably dead. Lorelei shoots the poachers to death in tears. The color rangers introduce themselves by name to Lorelei, before she changes into her mermaid form and swims off into the ocean to reunite with her mermaid roommates.
| 11 | "Field of dreams!" | Toshiya Shinohara | Masashi Suzuki | March 22, 2011 |
Yukitaka and the Kisaragi High School baseball team seemingly arrive at Koushien Stadium during their semi-final match, but it appears to be built in the middle of nowhere. Captain Craft, Sado and Colin are informed by Lafferty that the charter bus disappeared on the way to the stadium, in which it is deduced that the charter bus underwent spontaneous spatial translocation, otherwise being sucked into another dimension. When Prince Baka later appears at Koushien Stadium, the Kisaragi High School baseball team notices that only the locker room looks like Konan Municipal Stadium, leading Prince Baka to conclude that the Kisaragi High School baseball team is trapped inside someone's mind. Eliminating the source of the stress will get them back to the real world, but any member of the Kisaragi High School baseball team could be the suspect. Suddenly, the Matsukawa Commercial High School baseball team arrive to face off against the Kisaragi High School baseball team. Miho, Captain Craft, Sado, Colin and Lafferty meet up at the real stadium, where they realize that the answer is concentration instead of stress. Everything returns to normal after bulky right fielder Captain Iwata wakes up from his so-called dream.
| 12 | "Half moon...!" | Naokatsu Tsuda | Jukki Hanada | March 29, 2011 |
Prince Mohan and Princess Luna, who are respectively Prince Baka's younger brother and fiancée, meet with Captain Craft, Sado and Colin. Prince Baka, who takes refuge in Yukitaka's apartment, explains to Yukitaka that he convinced Dogra's succession assembly to pass a ridiculous bill that would keep him from getting married and taking the throne as king. After an intrigued Miho shows up at Yukitaka's apartment, Prince Mohan and Princess Luna suddenly appear outside Yukitaka's apartment in their escape pod. Princess Luna confesses her love for Prince Baka, but Prince Baka hightails it out of the apartment, riding off with Captain Craft, Sado and Colin. The next day in a canyon, Prince Baka, Captain Craft, Sado and Colin find a hidden spaceship creating a barrier in the atmosphere. The spaceship actually belongs to Prince Mohan, who may have feelings for Princess Luna, according to Prince Baka. During baseball practice, Yukitaka and Miho are told by Princess Luna that her arranged marriage with Prince Baka was to maintain peace between Dogra and Magura, proving her love by solving a difficult math problem. Prince Baka later finds hidden bugs in Yukitaka's apartment, soon realizing that Colin was a spy for Princess Luna.
| 13 | "Full moon...!" | Toshiyuki Katō | Jukki Hanada | April 5, 2011 |
Prince Baka shows Yukitaka and Miho an encoded message written by Princess Luna. The decoded message reveals that Princess Luna has prepared a fun quiz for Prince Baka at the peak of Mount Honeo underneath the perfectly round moon. Captain Craft and Sado confirm with Prince Baka that all lines of communication have been cut. Prince Baka realizes that both Prince Mohan and Princess Luna are impostors belonging to the Magura Freedom Alliance. At nighttime, Prince Baka brings Yukitaka and Miho to the hidden spaceship, where he concludes that Magura is behind his surveillance on Earth. In order to have a bloodless revolution, Prince Baka plans to catch the impostors in the act. Captain Craft and Sado are captured, but they eventually find the real Prince Mohan and Princess Luna imprisoned inside the spaceship. On the peak of Mount Honeo, Prince Baka confronts the impostors, catching the fake Princess Luna in the act and evading the sword of the fake Prince Mohan. Captain Craft and Sado suddenly arrive with the real Prince Mohan and Princess Luna in escape pods. However, after Prince Baka agrees to marry the fake Princess Luna, it turns out that the impostors were the real deal.

== Reception ==
The manga has sold over 2.2 million copies.

Carl Kimlinger of the Anime News Network gave an average grade to the first six episodes of the series, though he found that the artwork, animation, and music were good, and that its writing was "undeniably clever, even audacious". However, the reviewer felt the series to be less and less endearing to watch, particularly after the first three episodes, the absence of character Yukitaka Tsutsui, and the use of mini-story arcs. "There's a quixotic dignity in its use of entire story-arcs to set up single gags and a laudable courage in its willingness to experiment (check out the aged atmosphere created by episode four's thick lines and faded colors)," Kimlinger summarized. "That doesn't make it fun to watch, however. In fact, each successive episode leaves one feeling emptier and less charitable towards Prince than the last." Erin Finnegan of the same website made similar comments regarding the narrative progression of Level E. Finnegan stated, "Maybe it's just me. I can't get attached to characters who are only going to be around for a few episodes unless they make an incredible impression, otherwise it's very hard to write loveable characters that will only last for three or four episodes. [...] In Level E, it's hard to get attached to the Prince, who doesn't appear at all in some episodes, and in other episodes he gets very little screen time. Plus he's such a jerk, it's hard to like him or care about his shenanigans."
