= List of YuYu Hakusho characters =

The protagonists of YuYu Hakusho on top of an oni; from left to right: Kurama, Hiei, Kazuma Kuwabara, and Yusuke Urameshi

The Japanese manga series YuYu Hakusho features a diverse cast of characters created by Yoshihiro Togashi. It follows a fourteen-year-old junior high school delinquent Yusuke Urameshi, who dies but is resurrected to become the Underworld's detective of paranormal events in the Human World. He begins his work in the Human World, but ends up traveling to the Underworld and then eventually to the Demon Plane. In each case he undertakes, Yusuke meets several new enemies and allies. Other predominant characters include Yusuke's rival delinquent Kazuma Kuwabara, the fox demon Kurama, and the sword-wielding fire demon Hiei. While several characters are humans, many are demons, and both have different supernatural abilities due to harnessing their Reiki, one's own aura or life energy.

== Creation and conception ==
Togashi did not give much thought to the characters' names. He came up with them by skimming through a dictionary and combining kanji characters he found appealing. The author said the name Yusuke Urameshi is "practically a joke." Viz Media explained that the "Yu" is written with the kanji for "ghost", and "Urameshiii..." is a phrase typically said by wailing ghosts.

Togashi came up with Kazuma Kuwabara's name by combining the names of two professional baseball players (Masumi Kuwata and Kazuhiro Kiyohara). Viz Media said that it is also a pun on "Kuwabara kuwabara", a phrase uttered by superstitious people when they are scared. Mari Kitayama, a lead character designer for the anime adaptation of Yu Yu Hakusho, stated that she considers Kuwabara to be the most difficult character to design.

Kurama and Hiei's names came to Togashi on the spur of the moment. When the two were introduced, the author had early plans to make Kurama a main character but was uncertain about Hiei. Togashi based Hiei's design off of the character Skunky from the manga series Patalliro! by Mineo Maya. Kitayama finds Kurama to be the easiest of the main characters to design due to his well-proportioned features and considers Hiei to be her favorite.

The names of Yusuke's school, Sarayashiki, and the rival Kasanegafuchi Junior High are both named after haunted mansions in famous ghost stories; Banchō Sarayashiki and Kaidan Kasanegafuchi.

The names of the characters Roto and Rinku are taken from video game characters of the same names, the former from Dragon Quest and the latter from The Legend of Zelda.

Togashi's inspiration for the character Mukuro was Kushana of Torumekia from Nausicaä of the Valley of the Wind.

After receiving many letters both praising and criticizing the voice actors, Togashi clarified that he had no involvement in the anime adaptation.

The Tagalog dub, produced in the Philippines and titled Ghost Fighter, uses alternate character names. There, Yusuke is Eugene, Kuwabara is Alfred, Hiei is Vincent, Kurama is known as both Denise and Dennis, Genkai is Master Jeremiah, Koenma is Jericho, Keiko (Kayko) is Jenny, and Botan is Charlene. The Tagalog dub of the 2023 TV series uses the original Japanese character names.

== Protagonists ==
=== Yusuke Urameshi ===
Voiced by: Nozomu Sasaki (Japanese); Justin Cook (TV series and first film; Funimation dubs), Darren Pleavin (TV series; Animax Asia dub), Rik Nagel (second film; Central Park Media dub), Jonathan Fahn (first film; Anime Works dub; as "Jonathan Charles") (English)
Portrayed by: Tsubasa Sakiyama (stage play), Takumi Kitamura (TV drama)

Yusuke Urameshi (浦飯 幽助, Urameshi Yūsuke) is a fourteen-year-old delinquent who attends Sarayashiki Junior High School. His poor school attendance, constant fighting, and bad habits have earned him the fear of his classmates and the disdain of his teachers and neighbors.^{[ch. 1]} This all changes rather abruptly when Yusuke is struck and killed by a car while saving a small child who has wandered into the road. Such an altruistic deed catches even the Underworld ("Spirit World" in the English anime) by surprise, and because they do not have a place for him yet in heaven or hell, he is permitted to return to his body and resume his life.^{[ch. 1]} However, while doing so, it is revealed that Yusuke has a particularly strong aura or spirit energy, and Koenma recruits him as an Underworld Detective. Yusuke is charged with investigating supernatural phenomena in the Human World that have connections to the Underworld.^{[ch. 18]} Yusuke bears affection for his childhood friend Keiko Yukimura, who initially takes a role as Yusuke's conscience, making sure he comes to class and behaves, and later becomes his romantic interest. Yusuke's alcoholic mother, Atsuko, raised him as a single parent after conceiving him as a young teen.

=== Kazuma Kuwabara ===
Voiced by: Shigeru Chiba (Japanese); Christopher Sabat (TV series and first film, Funimation dubs), Russel Wait (TV Series, Animax Asia dub), Cliff Lazenby (second film; Central Park Media dub), Lex Lang (first film; Anime Works dub) (English)
Portrayed by: Naoya Gomoto (stage play), Shuhei Uesugi (TV drama)

Kazuma Kuwabara (桑原 和真, Kuwabara Kazuma) is a classmate of Yusuke's at Sarayashiki Junior High School. Despite his unusual affinity for kittens, he is the second toughest delinquent at the school, constantly picking fights with Yusuke to prove himself stronger, but never succeeding.^{[ch. 1]} Eventually, Kuwabara's anger toward Yusuke gives way to respect. Although he loves fighting, Kuwabara would never steal or extort money.^{[ch. 17]} Kuwabara has a very advanced sixth sense^{[ch. 3]} and is highly aware of the supernatural. Kuwabara ends up assisting in most of Yusuke's cases, having gained the ability to form a sword out of his aura called the Aura Sword (霊剣, Reiken; "Spirit Sword" in the English anime) during the competition to become Genkai's pupil.^{[ch. 26]} He learns to develop this power rather quickly; being able to wield two at once after training with Kurama for the Dark Tournament,^{[ch. 52,53]} and create a more powerful sword that boosts his recuperative abilities, acting as both a weapon and shield, by using the Sword of Trials he gets from Suzuki.^{[ch. 101]} Kuwabara later obtains the Dimensional Sword (次元刀, Jigen Tō) during his fight against Kiyoshi Mitarai, a sleeker and cleaner aura sword that possesses the ability to slice and cut through and between dimensions.^{[ch. 127]} This leads him to become the target of Sensui, as it will aid in completing the portal to the Demon Plane, and he is captured and later cuts the force field to chase after Sensui, fully opening the portal.

Kuwabara falls in love at first sight with the Ice Maiden Yukina and helps Yusuke rescue her from Gonzo Tarukane.^{[ch. 46]} Yukina is very grateful to Kuwabara for saving her from captivity, but is oblivious to his affection. Towards the end of the series, Kuwabara becomes more engrossed in his studies, choosing to cram for his high school exams rather than follow Yusuke and the others into the Demon Plane. In the end, Yukina lives with his family as a homestay.^{[ch. 171]} Kuwabara is a popular character among fans, coming in fourth place in the series' first two popularity polls. He came in fifth in the American Shonen Jump poll.

=== Kurama ===
Voiced by: Megumi Ogata (normal form); Shigeru Nakahara (demon form) (Japanese); John Burgmeier (TV series and first film; Funimation dubs), Candice Moore (TV Series; Animax Asia dub), Chris Orbach (second film; Central Park Media dub, as "Hideo Seaver"), David Hayter (first film; Anime Works dub) (English)
Portrayed by: Hiroki Suzuki (stage play), Jun Shison (TV drama)

Kurama (蔵馬) is a Fox Demon (妖狐, Yōko) and former thief who specialized in undoing seals and stealing ancient treasures.^{[ch. 21]} Fifteen years before the series began, he was badly injured and escaped to the Human World in soul form, where he entered an embryo in a pregnant human woman, becoming Shuichi Minamino (南野 秀一, Minamino Shūichi) at birth.^{[ch. 21]} Within ten or so years, his powers would return, and his body would become inhuman, at which point he planned to leave. However, Kurama comes to love his now-single human mother, and when she becomes gravely ill, he cannot bear to leave her all alone and remains as Shuichi in the Human World.^{[ch. 21]} Having teamed up with Hiei and Goki to steal three Underworld treasures, Kurama becomes a target of Yusuke Urameshi. However, he betrays his partners and takes the Mirror of Darkness (暗黒鏡, Ankoku-Kyō; known as the "Forlorn Hope" in the English anime dub), a mirror capable of granting the user's desire at the cost of the user's life, to cure his mother of her deadly illness. Yusuke saves Kurama's life with both of them giving some of their life forces; therefore, they both survive (in the anime, the mirror cancels the sacrifice due to Yusuke's kindness).^{[ch. 21]} This act bonds Yusuke and Kurama as friends and allies. He begins assisting Yusuke in defeating The Four Beasts in exchange for a reduced sentence.^{[ch. 33]}

Kurama is one of the most popular characters in the series, particularly in Japan. In Animage's Anime Grand Prix, he was ranked as the third most popular male anime character of 1993, and was voted the first place popular male character in both 1994 and 1995. In 2010 Kurama was ranked third best male anime character of the 1990s by the Japanese magazine Newtype. In more recent times, Japan's goo ranking site launched a poll in 2019 for users to vote for the hottest Shonen Jump character of all time, in which Kurama ranked fourth place.

=== Hiei ===
Voiced by: Nobuyuki Hiyama (Japanese); Chuck Huber (TV series and first film; Funimation dubs), Dave Bridges (TV Series; Animax Asia dub), James Stanley (second film; Central Park Media dub), Kirk Thornton (first film; Anime Works dub) (English)
Portrayed by: Shohei Hashimoto (stage play), Kanata Hongō (TV drama)

Hiei (飛影) is introduced as one of three wanted demons, alongside Kurama and Goki, who stole three treasures from the Underworld. With the Conjuring Blade (降魔の剣, Kōma no Ken), a sword that turns anyone cut by it into a demon, he plans to create an army.^{[ch. 22]} As the last of his partners on the run, Hiei kidnaps Keiko in an exchange with Yusuke for the other two treasures. However, he also cuts her with the Conjuring Blade, forcing Yusuke to defeat him to save her, which he does with help from Kurama and Botan.^{[ch. 23]} Hiei possesses the Evil Eye (邪眼, Jagan; referred to as the "Jagan Eye" in the English anime) implanted in his forehead, which gives him clairvoyance and allows him to control lesser demons and humans with only a glance.^{[ch. 22]} He can transform into a form with Evil Eyes all over his body, boosting his powers. While assisting Yusuke in defeating The Four Beasts in exchange for a reduced sentence, Hiei changes and no longer acts solely for his own interest.^{[ch. 38]} For associating with humans, Hiei and Kurama are invited to take part in the Dark Tournament on Yusuke and Kuwabara's team.^{[ch. 51]} During the Dark Tournament, he debuts the technique known as the Black Dragon Unholy Fire (邪王炎殺黒龍波, Jaō Ensatsu Kokuryūha; lit. "Tyrant King's Blaze-Murdering Black Dragon Wave", "Dragon of the Darkness Flame" in the English anime), which allows him to summon and control black flames from the Demon Plane.^{[ch. 57]} He eventually masters the technique by consuming the flames, which greatly enhances the user's abilities.^{[ch. 100]} Although he initially refrains from helping Yusuke and company stop Sensui from opening the portal to the Demon Plane because he wants to return himself, Hiei later joins them when Yusuke offers to let him have The Black Chapter videotape.^{[ch. 133]} After watching Yusuke's death by Sensui, Hiei's old demon powers awaken.^{[ch. 147]} He is invited to the Demon Plane to join Mukuro.^{[ch. 158]} He takes part in the Demon Plane Unification Tournament, losing to Mukuro in the third round. At the end of the series, he is assigned to the special squad in charge of safely returning humans who wander into the Demon Plane.^{[ch. 173]}

=== Keiko Yukimura ===
Voiced by: Yuri Amano (Japanese); Laura Bailey (TV Series; Funimation dub), Andrea Kwan (TV Series; Animax Asia dub), Shannon Conley (second film; Central Park Media dub) (English)
Portrayed by: Mirai (stage play), Sei Shiraishi (TV drama)

Keiko Yukimura (雪村 螢子, Yukimura Keiko; spelled "Kayko" in the FUNimation English anime) is Yusuke's childhood friend and classmate and eventually girlfriend. She has known Yusuke for many years and acts as a disciplinary figure, often trying to get him to attend his classes and behave, though usually to no avail.^{[ch. 1,2]} Yusuke attempts to keep his job as spirit detective a secret from Keiko, though she finds out about it. Keiko worries about Yusuke but knows that he is happier fighting demons than having a normal school life. When Yusuke leaves for the Demon Plane, he promises to return and proposes to her.^{[ch. 158]} At the end of the series, Keiko is entering college to be a teacher.^{[ch. 176]} She came in sixth in the American Shonen Jump poll.

=== Botan ===
Voiced by: Sanae Miyuki (Japanese); Cynthia Cranz (TV Series and first film; Funimation dubs), Sarah Hauser (TV Series; Animax Asia dub), Veronica Taylor (second film; Central Park Media dub), Lia Sargent (first film; Anime Works dub) (English)
Portrayed by: Yuka Hirata (stage play), Kotone Furukawa (TV drama)

Botan (ぼたん) is a guide to the Underworld or a shinigami, charged with ferrying souls of the deceased to the Underworld to face their final judgment.^{[ch. 1]} She is sent to inform Yusuke of the offer for him to be resurrected. She later acts as his assistant and trainer as he begins his tenure as Underworld Detective.^{[ch. 18]} Botan teaches him how to use the various detective tools, communicates messages from Koenma, and often guides him to different destinations for his cases. She will also join him in the field occasionally and protect Keiko from the crazed humans controlled by the Four Beasts. According to Koenma, Botan's sentimental side sometimes overcomes her professionalism.^{[ch. 93]} In the anime, she goes with Yusuke and Kuwabara to Tarukane's mansion and acts as team manager in the Dark Tournament. Botan is a popular character among fans, coming in fifth and sixth in the series' first two popularity polls. She came in fourth in the American Shonen Jump poll. Botan was ranked as the seventh most popular female anime character in Animage's 1993 Anime Grand Prix, the eighth in 1994, and the eleventh in 1995.

=== Genkai ===
Voiced by: Hisako Kyoda, Megumi Hayashibara (young) (Japanese); Linda Young (TV Series; Funimation dub), Candice Moore (TV Series; Animax Asia dub), Caryl Marder (second film; Central Park Media dub) (English)
Portrayed by: Elizabeth Marry (JA) (stage play), Meiko Kaji (TV drama)

Genkai (幻海) is an elderly martial arts expert who is famous among both humans and demons and considered one of the top five reiki masters according to her friend Koenma.^{[ch. 24]} She first appears holding a tournament to find a successor for her techniques, which Yusuke and Kuwabara both take part in. Having entered the tournament as a detective on a case, Yusuke wins after defeating Rando and is taken on as Genkai's student.^{[ch. 31]} Disguising herself as the "Masked Fighter" (覆面戦士), Genkai enters the Dark Tournament on Team Urameshi. 50 years earlier, Genkai and Younger Toguro were lovers and teammates in an earlier Dark Tournament. After winning, the two split as Toguro decided to become a demon, while she wanted to grow old together.^{[ch. 90,92]} When using her full power, Genkai's cells revitalize, and her body rejuvenates momentarily, causing her to appear as she did in her prime, around 20 years old.^{[ch. 77]} During the semifinals against Team Fractured Fairy Tales, Genkai imparts her strength to Yusuke, leaving her much weaker.^{[ch. 85]} Now of no use to him, Toguro kills Genkai the day before the finals.^{[ch. 92]} After Team Urameshi wins the tournament, Genkai is brought back to life by Koenma for their reward at Toguro's suggestion.^{[ch. 113]} She has Asato Kido, Yu Kaito, and Mitsunari Yanagisawa attack Yusuke and friends as a training lesson and to inform them that someone is opening a portal to the Demon Plane.^{[ch. 119]} At Kurama's request, Genkai trains Rinku, Chu, Toya, Jin, Shishiwakamaru and Suzuki to balance power in the Demon Plane.^{[ch. 163]} At the end of the series, Genkai decides to leave her vast land to Yusuke and his friends.^{[ch. 176]} While Genkai had already died during this moment in the manga, in the anime, she is still alive. Genkai is a popular character among fans, ranking seventh place in the series' second popularity poll. In a 2007 poll by Oricon, Genkai was tied with two other characters as the fifth-best anime "master" with a 6% vote.

In the Tagalog dub of the Philippines (titled Ghost Fighter), the character is male and is named Jeremiah. The voice actors did not learn that Genkai was female until production of the Tagalog dub was underway. Accordingly, the Filipino version of the character is male, and a male voice actor was used. Genkai's reveal as a woman in the Dark Tournament story arc confused Filipino viewers.

=== Koenma ===
Voiced by: Mayumi Tanaka (Japanese); Sean Michael Teague (TV series and first film; Funimation dubs), Candice Moore (TV Series; Animax Asia dub), Eric Stuart (second film; Central Park Media dub), Brianne Siddall (first film; Anime Works dub) (English)
Portrayed by: Hirofumi Araki (stage play), Keita Machida (TV drama)

King Enma Jr., usually addressed as Koenma (コエンマ; combination of "Enma" and "ko", meaning "child"), is the son of King Enma, the one in charge of judging whether a soul goes to heaven or hell. Koenma takes over the responsibilities of his father's work when he is away.^{[ch. 2]} Though he is said to be at least 700 years old, Koenma usually appears as a toddler with a pacifier in his mouth and wearing a large hat with the kanji for "king" and the English letters "Jr". He can also transform into a young adult form, retaining his pacifier but losing his hat, showing the letters "Jr" on his forehead.^{[ch. 54]} Koenma acts as Yusuke's boss, assigning him his Underworld Detective cases through Botan.^{[ch. 18]} His pacifier is a receptacle that Koenma constantly imbues with his aura so it can create a powerful barrier to fend off a dark age still centuries away.^{[ch. 143]} However, after deciding to use it early to stop Sensui, it proves ineffective because of Sensui's Holy Chi.^{[ch. 145]} At the end of the series, an investigation by Koenma revealed that his father had been falsifying reports on demon activity against humans to justify keeping the two separated. Having proven that the criminal statistics are much lower, Koenma is now in charge of the Underworld and allows access between the Demon Plane and the Human World.^{[ch. 171]} Koenma is a popular character with fans, coming in seventh and fifth place in the series' first two popularity polls. He came in ninth in the American Shonen Jump poll.

== Antagonists ==
=== Genkai Tournament candidates ===
==== Rando ====
Voiced by: Yō Inoue (Japanese); Eric Vale (English)

Rando (乱童, Randō) is a demon of battle who specializes in defeating martial arts masters and monks.^{[ch. 24]} Having killed 99 masters so far, he steals their secret techniques and tests them out on humans. Rando participates in Genkai's tournament to select her pupil to learn her techniques, and Yusuke is sent to stop him on Koenma's orders.^{[ch. 24]} Rando initially disguises himself as Shaolin (少林, Shōrin; "Shorin" in the English anime), a monk, during the tournament so as not to draw attention to himself. He defeats Kuwabara and is about to beat Yusuke with the same technique. Rando's ignorance of the stolen techniques backfires on him, and Yusuke defeats him. Botan then arrests him.^{[ch. 31]} Rando came in tenth place in the series' first popularity poll. He also came in tenth in the American Shonen Jump poll.

==== Kazemaru ====
Voiced by: Mitsuaki Madono (Japanese); Mike McFarland (English)

Kazemaru (風丸, Kazemaru) is a ninja who guards VIPs and eventually decides to compete in Genkai's tournament. Kazemaru wielded a version of the Spirit Gun that was more powerful than Yusuke's own, expelled from his entire palm. He also wields explosive shuriken capable of pursuing their target. Yusuke was still able to defeat him, largely due to luck.^{[ch. 29]}

==== Kuroda ====
Voiced by: Chikao Shiroyama (Japanese); Brice Armstrong (English)

Kuroda (黒田, Kuroda) is a professional contract killer who is defeated by Kazemaru.^{[ch. 27]}

==== Chinpo ====
Voiced by: Tomomichi Nishimura (Japanese); Kyle Hebert (English)

Chinpo (珍宝, Chinpo) is a wanderer and a tournament competitor who is defeated by Rando.^{[ch. 27]}

==== Musashi ====
Voiced by: Taro Arakawa (Japanese); Bill Townsley (English)

Musashi (武蔵, Musashi) is a wandering swordsman who hunts down demons. Musashi can cloak his spirit energy, allowing him to bypass Kuwabara's high spiritual awareness and remain undetected. He carries around a wooden sword capable of killing demons. Kuwabara defeats him with his newfound Spirit Sword power.^{[ch. 27]}

==== Kibano ====
Voiced by: Hidetoshi Nakamura (Japanese); Chris Rager (English)

Kibano (牙野, Kibano) is a self-proclaimed master of all the world's martial arts. He has the power to absorb spirit energy from the environment to enlarge his muscles. Yusuke defeats him with clever thinking.^{[ch. 28]}

=== The Four Beasts ===
The Four Beasts (四聖獣, Shiseijū; "Four Saint Beasts" in the English anime) are four demons who run a criminal organization in a part of the Demon Plane called Demon City (魔街), a haven for criminals.^{[ch. 32]} To get the Underworld to allow them access to the Human World, the Four Beasts release parasitic insects into the human world, causing them to send Yusuke to their Labyrinth Castle (迷宮城) to stop them. The Four Beasts share their names with the four symbols of Chinese astrology.

==== Genbu ====
Voiced by: Yutaka Shimaka (Japanese); Chris Forbis (English)

Genbu (玄武) is a rock demon with the power to move through stone as though it were part of his body.^{[ch. 34]} Although he can reassemble his shattered body, he is defeated by Kurama.

==== Byakko ====
Voiced by: Takeshi Watabe (Japanese); Andrew Chandler (English)

Byakko (白虎) is an anthropomorphic tiger who can turn pieces of his hair into lesser beasts, absorb aura energy, and fire sonic blasts from his mouth that destroy everything they touch by destroying their molecular bonds.^{[ch. 35,36,37]} Although Kuwabara defeats him, he is killed by Seiryu.

==== Seiryu ====
Voiced by: Mitsuo Senda (Japanese); Justin Cook (English)

Seiryu (青龍, Seiryū) is a demon with enhanced speed and control over ice. He is quickly cut to pieces by Hiei.^{[ch. 38]}

==== Suzaku ====
Voiced by: Nobuo Tobita (Japanese); Jerry Jewell (English)

Suzaku (朱雀) is the leader of the Four Beasts. A demon who uses lightning to attack, he can split himself into seven separate, yet equally powerful bodies.^{[ch. 40,41]} Suzaku came in sixth place in the series' first popularity poll. He came in eighth in the American Shonen Jump poll.

=== Team Jolly Devil Six ===
Team Jolly Devil Six (六遊怪, Rokuyukai) is the first team that Team Urameshi fights in the opening round of the Dark Tournament. Sponsored by Sukezo Gondawara (権田原助造, Gondawara Sukezo) of the Black Book Club, it consists of demons from the red-light district who have little to no acclaim.^{[ch. 54]} The members decided their alternate by rock–paper–scissors.^{[ch. 53]}

==== Rinku ====
Voiced by: Reiko Kondo (Japanese); Kimberly Grant (English)

Rinku (鈴駒; alternately "Link") is a young demon who uses yo-yos to attack. Rinku is childish and playful. He often annoys those around him. He is the first fighter on his team to step forward in the ring, fighting Kuwabara. Rinku controls his yo-yos by channeling his aura through the strings, is very acrobatic, and is capable of healing his wounds with his demon energy.^{[ch. 55,56]} He defeats Kuwabara by ring out, though he is quick to cheer for Team Urameshi after his own team's loss. During the fight for control of the Demon Plane, Rinku is one of the demons that Genkai and Kurama train to fight for Yomi, though they eventually all disband to fight individually in the Demon Plane Unification Tournament.^{[ch. 163,164]} At the end of the series, he is seen with Sasuga, a female demon who defeated him in the tournament and with whom he fell in love.^{[ch. 174]}

==== Roto ====
Voiced by: Toshiyuki Morikawa (Japanese); Sean Schemmel (English)

Roto (呂屠), a demon who can form a sickle on top of his hand, is the second member to fight. He has his familiars stalk Kurama's human mother to force him into submission, until the plant Kurama planted in Roto blooms, killing him.^{[ch. 56]}

==== Zeru ====
Voiced by: Mitsuaki Madono (Japanese); Jeremy Loris (English)

Zeru (是流) is a demon with control over fire. He is the team leader, and his power is far greater than his teammates', except for Chu. Because of this, Hiei quickly beats him by summoning powers he can not yet completely control, leaving his right arm severely injured.^{[ch. 56]} The remaining team members run away after Hiei displays his power.

==== Chu ====
Voiced by: Norio Wakamoto (Japanese); Kent Williams (English)

Chu (酎, Chū) is the strongest fighter of Team Jolly Devil Six. Although he is technically the team's alternate fighter due to losing at rock-paper-scissors, he fights after decapitating his fleeing teammates, Imajin and Gaou.^{[ch. 56]} A user of the Drunken Fist (酔拳, Suiken), Chu gets stronger the drunker he is, and is touted as an alchemist who fuses the alcohol he drinks with his demon aura.^{[ch. 58,59]} After exhausting their auras, he and Yusuke agree to a hand-to-hand combat fight with their heels against two knives stuck into the arena floor, which Chu loses after both use headbutts.^{[ch. 60]} During the fight for control of the Demon Plane, Chu is one of the demons that Genkai and Kurama train to fight for Yomi, though they eventually all disband to fight individually in the Demon Plane Unification Tournament.^{[ch. 163,164]} At the end of the series, he is training with Natsume, the female demon who defeated him in the tournament and whom he fell in love with.^{[ch. 174]}

==== Imajin and Gaou ====
Imajin (威魔陣) and Gaou (牙王, Gaō) are simultaneously decapitated by Chu as they flee in fear of Hiei.^{[ch. 56]}

=== Team Ichigaki ===
Dr. Ichigaki
Voiced by: Ryuji Saikachi (Japanese); James Fields (English)

Team Ichigaki is the second team that Team Urameshi faces in the Dark Tournament. It is led by Dr. Ichigaki (Dr.イチガキ), an evil demon scientist intent on creating the ultimate biological weapons.^{[ch. 62]} He duped three martial artists, En (円), Kai (魁), and Ryo (梁, Ryō), also known as M1, M2, and M3, respectively, into volunteering for an experiment in exchange for curing their master of a deadly disease. He then implanted the Blood-Slaver Node onto their backs, giving him control of their minds and boosting their fighting abilities. It is revealed that Ichigaki is the one who originally poisoned their master to manipulate them.^{[ch. 63]} Yusuke, Kuwabara, and the Masked Fighter fight these martial artists in a battle royale. Kurama and Hiei are delayed fighting two lesser members of the team and the robot-like Gattasval (ガタスバル, Gatasubaru) in the wilderness outside the competition.^{[ch. 62,63]} Due to their refined auras, the three martial artists' attacks are invisible to the weaker Yusuke and Kuwabara.^{[ch. 62]} After Team Ichigaki knocks Kuwabara down for a ten count, the Masked Fighter destroys the Blood-Slaver Nodes on all three, knocking all three down for a simultaneous ten count and winning the round for Team Urameshi. The martial artists survive and, free of Ichigaki's control, reunite with their master, who was healed by Kurama.^{[ch. 66]}

=== Team Shadow Channelers ===
Team Shadow Channelers (魔性使い, Mashōtsukai; "Team Masho" in the English dub) is the third team that Team Urameshi faces in the Dark Tournament. They are a group of renowned ninja demons who are hoping to win the tournament so they can claim the hosting island as their home.^{[ch. 67,69]} Their sponsor is Butajiri (豚尻) of the Black Book Club. Team Urameshi fights Team Shadow Channelers immediately after Team Ichigaki and, under the guise of a medical exam, Hiei and the Masked Fighter are forced to sit out by Luka.^{[ch. 67]}

==== Gama ====
Voiced by: Kazuyuki Sogabe (Japanese); Christopher Sabat (English)

Gama (画魔), a "Master of Ritual Adornment", is the first member to fight, doing so through ritual body art that he paints using his blood. In addition to painting himself to boost his power, he also paints designs on his opponents to seal their movements. Before dying from Kurama's attack, Gama paints a design on him that binds Kurama's demonic aura for another ten minutes to aid his team.^{[ch. 68]}

==== Toya ====
Voiced by: Yasunori Matsumoto (Japanese); Daniel Katzuk (English)

Toya (凍矢, Tōya; "Touya" in the English dub), the "Hexed Ice Master", is the second member of Team Shadow Channelers to fight. He battles Kurama, whose demonic aura was sealed in the previous match by Gama, using sharp ice projectiles and an ice sword that is attached to his hand. However, he is defeated when Kurama plants his attack into his own wounds to access his aura and knock Toya down for a ten-count.^{[ch. 69]} During the fight for control of the Demon Plane, Toya is one of the demons that Genkai and Kurama train to fight for Yomi, though they eventually all disband to fight individually in the Demon Plane Unification Tournament.^{[ch. 163,164]}

==== Bakuken ====
Voiced by: Hajime Koseki (Japanese); Andrew Chandler (English)

Bakuken (爆拳; "Bakken" in the English dub), the third member to fight, is a demon who can create a thick fog from his sweat and beats an unconscious Kurama until winning the match via ring out at the orders of Risho.^{[ch. 70]} As the weakest member of Team Shadow Channelers, Yusuke quickly defeats him.^{[ch. 71]}

==== Jin ====
Voiced by: Kappei Yamaguchi (Japanese); Jerry Jewell (English)

Jin (陣), the "Wind Master", is the fourth member of Team Shadow Channelers to fight. He can fly at great speeds and block and change the course of any energy-based attacks that travel through the air.^{[ch. 72]} His signature move is to spin his forearm at high speed, creating a tornado around it, making his punches more powerful, even causing damage when he misses. Jin enjoys his battles, especially when he has a worthy opponent. Although his fight with Yusuke is initially ruled a loss for Jin via ring out, the decision is overturned and declared a draw.^{[ch. 74]} He and Yusuke have a lot in common, and it is apparent that both enjoyed their fight. During the fight for control of the Demon Plane, Jin is one of the demons that Genkai and Kurama train to fight for Yomi, though they eventually all disband to fight individually in the Demon Plane Unification Tournament.^{[ch. 163,164]}

==== Risho ====
Voiced by: Aruno Tahara (Japanese); Mike McFarland (English)

Risho (吏将, Rishō) is a demon with power over earth, using it to form armor made of clay.^{[ch. 75]} Despite unfair interference by the Tournament organizers throughout the entire round, Kuwabara defeats Risho for the final win thanks to a revitalization after Yukina appears.^{[ch. 76]}

=== Team Fractured Fairy Tales ===
Team Fractured Fairy Tales (裏御伽, Uraotogi) fights Team Urameshi in the semifinals of the Dark Tournament. Composed of fighters gathered together by Suzuki, who furnished them with weapons he created,^{[ch. 87]} their names, appearances, and powers are derived from myths in Japanese folklore. The matches are decided by rolling the dice, with Hiei initially filling in for both Yusuke and the Masked Fighter (Genkai), while the latter gives Yusuke the final test as her student.^{[ch. 79]}

==== Evil Kintaro ====
Evil Kintaro (魔金太郎, Makintarō), a parody of Kintarō, is a demon who can turn his hand into an ax. Hiei quickly kills him with his swordsmanship.^{[ch. 79]}

==== Poison Peach Boy ====
Poison Peach Boy (黒桃太郎, Kuro Momotarō; lit. "Black Peach Boy"), a parody of Momotarō, is a demon who can make himself impervious to any attack his body has experienced by absorbing his Millet Dumplings.^{[ch. 80]} These dumplings also transform his body, giving it simian, avian, or canine characteristics, but he is killed by Hiei.^{[ch. 81]}

==== Reverse Urashima ====
Reverse Urashima (裏浦島, Ura Urashima), a parody of Urashima Tarō, wields a fishing pole as a weapon and the Reverse Magic Box ("Idun Box" in the English anime) against Kurama. The box of smoke makes anyone who breathes it grow younger. However, it inadvertently turns Kurama into his original, more powerful fox demon form, before he entered a human embryo.^{[ch. 82]} Terrified, Reverse Urashima begs for his life and begins to reveal his team's secrets, before being killed by Shishiwakamaru, revealing he was a weak Illusion Beast.^{[ch. 83]}

==== Shishiwakamaru ====
Voiced by: Toshiyuki Morikawa (Japanese); Christopher Bevins (English)

Shishiwakamaru (死々若丸; "Shishi Wakamaru" in the English anime), a parody of Minamoto no Yoshitsune who was known as 'Ushiwakamaru' in his childhood, is a swordsman who seeks to make himself famous. He quickly wins his first match against Kuwabara by teleporting him to the old Dark Tournament arena.^{[ch. 84]} He then faces the recently reappeared Masked Fighter (Genkai), who is now much weaker, having given Yusuke her aura.^{[ch. 85]} Upon learning he is facing the famous Genkai, Shishiwakamaru uses the Banshee Blade (魔哭鳴斬剣). The Banshee Blade is a sword that channels the souls of the dead to amplify its attacks, but is defeated when she absorbs and reflects his attack at him.^{[ch. 86]} During the fight for control of the Demon Plane, Shishiwakamaru is one of the demons that Genkai and Kurama train to fight for Yomi, though they eventually all disband to fight individually in the Demon Plane Unification Tournament.^{[ch. 163,164]}

==== Suzuki ====
Voiced by: Kazuyuki Sogabe, Takashi Taguchi (disguise) (Japanese); Jeremy Inman, James Fields (disguise) (English)

Suzuki (鈴木) excels at creating weapons for others, as well as controlling his aura harmonics, enabling him to create varied and colorful attacks.^{[ch. 88]} He initially disguises himself as an elderly man known as "Old Bloke" (怨爺, Onjī). After revealing his own clown appearance, Suzuki states that he used the disguise to help him fight harder, dressed as what he hates. Extremely vain, he refers to himself as Suzuki "the Beautiful," and wants to become famous before he shows signs of age.^{[ch. 88]} He quickly wins his first match against Kuwabara by teleporting him to the old Dark Tournament arena, just like Shishiwakamaru did.^{[ch. 87]} However, Genkai then easily defeats Suzuki using only physical attacks.^{[ch. 88]} Suzuki later gives the Sword of Trials to Kuwabara and the Seed of De-Incarnation to Kurama, which he had previously given to Shishiwakamaru and Reverse Urashima, respectively, to aid them against Team Toguro.^{[ch. 93]} In the past, Suzuki fought Younger Toguro but was spared after begging for his life. He then trained and vowed to defeat Toguro in the Dark Tournament, not for revenge, but to prove to Toguro that power is not everything, but now realizes he will not be the one to do it.^{[ch. 93]} During the fight for control of the Demon Plane, Suzuki is one of the demons that Genkai and Kurama train to fight for Yomi, though they eventually all disband to fight individually in the Demon Plane Unification Tournament.^{[ch. 163,164]} Originally in the English dub, he was named "Suzuka" until the later remastered version that was part of the Blu-Ray release in 2011.

=== Team Toguro ===
Team Toguro is the fifth and final team that Team Urameshi faces in the Dark Tournament. They are the winners of the previous tournament.^{[ch. 61]} Younger Toguro fights the preliminary round alone, while his three teammates sweep the semifinal round.^{[ch. 61,89]} Togashi considers the Toguro Brothers to be his favorite villains in the series because they are "fundamentally unrestrained." The Toguro Brothers came in eleventh place in the series' first popularity poll. In the second, Younger Toguro placed tenth and Elder Toguro eleventh. The brothers came in seventh in the American Shonen Jump poll.

==== Younger Toguro ====
Voiced by: Tesshō Genda (Japanese); Dameon Clarke (English)
Portrayed by: Go Ayano (TV drama)

Younger Toguro (戸愚呂弟, Toguro-otōto) is first introduced alongside his older brother as Brokers of Darkness (闇ブローカー, Yami Burōkā), demons who provide monsters for things such as sideshows or assault forces, hired by Gonzo Tarukane to make Yukina cry.^{[ch. 46]} However, it is revealed that their actual client was Sakyo, who is also their team sponsor in the Dark Tournament.^{[ch. 51]} Younger Toguro is a human-turned-demon and the main antagonist during the Dark Tournament arc. His ability is purely physical strength. He can regulate how much of his maximum power he releases, ranging from 0% to 100%.^{[ch. 47]} With each increase comes a burst of demon energy, and his muscles thicken and enlarge. At full power, he needs to feed on aura to maintain such immense power, leading him to absorb the aura of weaker creatures.^{[ch. 108]}

Once a great martial arts master and Genkai's lover, Toguro was psychologically scarred when a demon named Kairen killed all of his students while inviting him to participate in the Dark Tournament.^{[ch. 113]} Toguro defeated Kairen in the final round to win the tournament and decided he did not want to age and lose his power; therefore, he asked to be turned into a demon. 50 years later, he invites Yusuke to the tournament in hopes of finally finding a fighter worthy of his full 100% power. Although he stops Yusuke's final attack in the final round, Toguro's body is destroyed, and he dies.^{[ch. 111]} In the afterlife, he is offered a lighter sentence by Koenma due to his time as a martial artist. Toguro refuses and requests the harshest sentence there is: 10,000 years of torture in hell for 10,000 cycles, with his soul ceasing to exist afterward.^{[ch. 113]} In the English anime dub, this is changed to him requesting limbo. Feeling it obvious what Team Urameshi would wish for as their prize for winning the tournament, it was Toguro who suggested Koenma resurrect Genkai.^{[ch. 113]}

Team Toguro, from left to right: Bui, Younger Toguro, Elder Toguro, Karasu

==== Elder Toguro ====
Voiced by: Katsumi Suzuki (Japanese); Bill Townsley (Funimation dub), Victor Lee (Animax Asia dub) (English)
Portrayed by: Kenichi Takitō (TV drama)

Elder Toguro (戸愚呂兄, Toguro-ani) is first introduced alongside his younger brother as Brokers of Darkness, demons who provide monsters for things such as sideshows or assault forces, hired by Tarukane to make Yukina cry.^{[ch. 46]} However, it is revealed that their actual client was Sakyo, who is also their team sponsor in the Dark Tournament.^{[ch. 51]} Elder Toguro is a human turned demon shapeshifter. He usually rides on his much larger brother's shoulder and often fights alongside him. Elder Toguro can alter the shape of his body to form weapons and shields or move his organs to escape harm, and has regenerative abilities, making him nearly immortal.^{[ch. 49,101]}

In the second-to-last match of the Dark Tournament, Kuwabara manages to defeat Elder Toguro by squashing him with the Aura Sword (whose shape had been manipulated into that of a flyswatter).^{[ch. 102]} In the Dark Tournament's final match between Yusuke and Younger Toguro, Elder Toguro reveals he is still alive and offers to be his brother's weapon. However, Younger Toguro obliterates him with a single punch, saying that the fight will be one-on-one only.^{[ch. 103]}

After being nearly destroyed by his brother, Elder Toguro slowly regenerated until he was a head Sensui found. Elder Toguro sought revenge and told Sensui about Yusuke, who decided it was time to begin his plan to destroy humanity.^{[ch. 139]} Toguro was later devoured by Sadao Makihara. Toguro easily took control of his body and acquired Makihara's abilities as well as those of Makihara's past victims. In his fight with Kurama, Makihara/Toguro is captured in a parasitic tree that casts illusions, and because of Toguro's immortality, he is stuck fighting Kurama's ghost for eternity.^{[ch. 139]}

==== Karasu ====
Voiced by: Ryō Horikawa (Japanese); Kyle Hebert (English)
Portrayed by: Hiroya Shimizu (TV drama)

Karasu (鴉) is a master-class demon bomber.^{[ch. 96]} Like Bui, Karasu fought against the Toguro brothers and lost, and subsequently became a member of Team Toguro. He can use his aura to create and control bombs undetectable by weaker demons.^{[ch. 96]} Karasu displays sadistic tendencies, stating that he favors Kurama and becomes depressed when he destroys what he likes, but enjoys being depressed and therefore is looking forward to killing him.^{[ch. 90]} He wears a mask over his mouth, which seems to restrict his powers.^{[ch. 97]} He can also use his entire body as an explosive. Karasu fights Kurama in the opening match of the final round of the Dark Tournament. Due to letting his guard down, Karasu is killed by Kurama, whose fox demon powers have started to return to his human body.^{[ch. 98]} But because Kurama did not get up until after a ten count, Karasu is ruled the winner.^{[ch. 99]} Karasu is a popular character among fans, ranking eighth in the series' second popularity poll.

==== Bui ====
Voiced by: Tetsuo Kanao (Japanese); Vic Mignogna (English)

Bui (武威) is a demon warrior with an immense battle aura that even allows him to levitate. He wears heavy armor to suppress his aura and wields an axe larger than his own body.^{[ch. 99]} During the second match of the final round of the Dark Tournament, Bui faces Hiei and loses as the latter has mastered the Black Dragon Hellfire.^{[ch. 100]} When he was younger, Bui fought Younger Toguro and lost. With the prospect of a rematch, he trained and improved, but so did Toguro. Having lost to Hiei, this proves he will never beat Toguro, so Bui asks Hiei to kill him, which Hiei refuses to do.^{[ch. 100]}

==== Sakyo ====
Voiced by: Nobuyuki Furuta (Japanese); Eric Vale (English)
Portrayed by: Goro Inagaki (TV drama)

Sakyo (左京, Sakyō) is first introduced as a young member of the Black Book Club (ブラック・ブック・クラブ, Burakku Bukku Kurabu), a group of wealthy humans who deal with demons and compete in high-stakes gambling, betting on whether Yusuke and Kuwabara will succeed in defeating Tarukane's bodyguards, the Toguro brothers, and their men.^{[ch. 47]} After winning all bets and bankrupting Tarukane, it is revealed that Sakyo hired the Toguro brothers and had them throw the fight, and that Tarukane originally stole Yukina from Sakyo.^{[ch. 51]} Sakyo sponsors Team Toguro in the Dark Tournament. He is a sociopath who grew up torturing and killing animals and people.^{[ch. 94]} He has an affinity and knack for gambling, occasionally putting his life on the line just for the thrill. With his expected monetary winnings from the tournament, Sakyo plans to create a large hole or portal linking the Demon Plane with the Human World, for no reason other than to see what happens.^{[ch. 94]} After Younger Toguro's death and having staked his own life on the victory, Sakyo self-destructs the tournament arena and is crushed to death.^{[ch. 112]} In the anime, he forms a romantic bond with Shizuru Kuwabara.

=== Sensui Seven ===
The Sensui Seven (仙水一味, Sensui Ichimi) are a group who are trying to open a portal linking the Human World with the Demon Plane. Led by Shinobu Sensui, it comprises seven individuals referred to by nicknames, which are also the names of their abilities. Sensui used The Black Chapter, a videotape that documents thousands of hours of humanity's atrocities, to recruit the human members in his goal to eradicate humanity for being evil.^{[ch. 127]}

==== Shinobu Sensui ====
Voiced by: Rokuro Naya, Akira Ishida (young) (Japanese); Robert McCollum (English)

Shinobu Sensui (仙水忍, Sensui Shinobu), also known as Dark Angel (暗黒天使(ダークエンジェル), Dāku Enjeru; "Black Angel" in the English anime), is a former Underworld Detective and the main antagonist during the Sensui arc.^{[ch. 127]} Born with a powerful sixth sense, Sensui was a prodigy aura user and demon hunter from an early age.^{[ch. 128]} He was recruited as an Underworld Detective and worked tirelessly as an advocate for justice, believing demons to be humanity's enemy. During a case to stop a small Demon Plane portal created by the Black Book Club, including Sakyo, Sensui found a room where humans were torturing demons and bathing in their blood.^{[ch. 128]} After Sensui saw the cruelty of humans, in antithesis to what he believed, he went mad and murdered everyone in the room. He began to question humanity itself and soon disappeared, taking The Black Chapter with him.^{[ch. 128]} Sensui waited ten years for a new Underworld Detective to emerge before coming out of hiding and enacting his plan to judge the human race.^{[ch. 127]}

During his years in hiding, Sensui created six alternate personalities (seven, including himself) to deal with the pressures of battle; Shinobu is the original and central one, while three others deal with matters of combat. Only three of the seven are seen, while a fourth is described, they are: Minoru (ミノル), a talkative, argumentative, and proud speaker who is in control for the majority of the arc; Kazuya (カズヤ), a sadistic killer with a gun built into his arm who takes over as Yusuke gets the upper hand fighting Minoru; Naru (ナル), a shy, naïve and sensitive female personality only spoken of by Itsuki; and Shinobu, the original personality who takes over after Yusuke beats Kazuya for attempting to kill Koenma.^{[ch. 142,142]} Sensui is a master of Lightning Kickboxing (裂蹴拳, Resshūken), a fighting style that uses the upper body for defensive maneuvers that act as transitions for offensive kicks.^{[ch. 129]} Sensui also wields Holy Chi (聖光気, Seikōki), a special type of aura that is said to be the purest of all.^{[ch. 144]}

After Raizen, Yusuke's demon ancestor, takes over Yusuke's body briefly and deals Sensui a fatal blow, Itsuki revealed that Sensui suffered from an aggressive metastatic cancer, with only two weeks left to live. Before dying, Sensui states that he longed to have demon heritage, that he created the portal so that he could die in the Demon Plane, and wishes that he be reincarnated as a demon.^{[ch. 153]}

==== Itsuki/Gatekeeper ====
Voiced by: Kōji Tsujitani (Japanese); Jerome 57 (English)

Itsuki (樹), also known as Gatekeeper (闇撫の樹(ゲートキーパー), Gētokīpā), is a demon who was Sensui's partner as an Underworld Detective.^{[ch. 128]} They were enemies when they first met, and Itsuki lost the fight, but Sensui spared him after seeing a glimpse of his human side. He anticipated Sensui's madness before it began, based on the quality of his pure soul, and looked forward to watching him sink into despair at the horrors he was unable to rationalize.^{[ch. 140]} Itsuki is a Dark Night Stroker (闇撫, Yaminabe), a demon who possesses the Shadow Hands (影ノ手, Kage no Te), which allows him to traverse dimensions and who can control lesser demons in different dimensions, such as the 2-D demon Inverse Man (裏男, Ura Otoko; "Reverse Man" in the English anime).^{[ch. 140]} He is the one who creates the portal to the Demon Plane. Itsuki has the Inverse Man transport Kuwabara, Kurama, and Hiei to hyperspace to watch Yusuke's fight with Sensui without interference or escape. After Sensui's death, Itsuki informs Koenma that he cannot have Sensui's soul, as he didn't want to go to the Underworld, and takes his body into another dimension, so they can stay together for eternity.^{[ch. 153]} Itsuki is one of Togashi's favorite characters. After the series ended, Togashi stated that he wished he had been able to expand on the character's twisted psyche. He also noted the portion of the plot where Itsuki speaks inside the Inverse Man to be his favorite of the series because it reflects how the manga artist was feeling at the time.

==== Minoru Kamiya/Doctor ====
Voiced by: Taro Arakawa (Japanese); Sonny Strait (English)

Minoru Kamiya (神谷 実, Kamiya Minoru), also known as Doctor (医者(ドクター), Dokutā), is a human physician and one of Sensui's companions. His medical skills allow him to use his hands as scalpels, reattach limbs, and create an aura virus to infect people in his territory.^{[ch. 123]} Kamiya also enhanced his physical abilities and can control adrenaline, so he does not feel pain.^{[ch. 123]} He knows that finishing the portal to the Demon Plane will mean the destruction of the Human World and himself, but believes that death by a demon is a fitting end for him over disease or old age.^{[ch. 124]} Kamiya is defeated by Yusuke, saving those infected by his virus, but is cured by Genkai and then arrested.^{[ch. 124,125]} At the end of the arc, Kamiya escapes from jail, resuscitates Hagiri, and reconstructs his own face to evade police. He later dubbed his ability "psychic healing" and founded the dojo of the Miracle Hand.^{[ch. 154]}

==== Kaname Hagiri/Sniper ====
Voiced by: Eiji Sekiguchi (Japanese); Aaron Hatch (English)

Kaname Hagiri (刃霧 要, Hagiri Kaname), also known as Sniper (狙撃手(スナイパー), Sunaipā), is a seventeen-year-old human and one of Sensui's comrades. His ability, Deathprint Bullseye, allows him to "shoot" any object infused with his aura at his enemy. After marking his enemy with targets, these objects will zero in on them without fail. While trying to stop Yusuke from following Sensui and company, Hagiri is seemingly killed by Hiei.^{[ch. 132]} But it is later revealed that Hiei was very precise not to kill him, and Kamiya healed him. He is last seen alongside his sister, who has an ability akin to psychometry, and sets out after a group of bullies who killed a kitten after his sister shows him these events.^{[ch. 154]} He later disappeared after high school.

==== Kiyoshi Mitarai/Seaman ====
Voiced by: Rica Matsumoto (Japanese); Justin Pate (English)

Kiyoshi Mitarai (御手洗 清志, Mitarai Kiyoshi), also known as Seaman (水兵(シーマン), Shīman), is a fourteen-year-old human and one of Sensui's comrades. His ability, Seaman, allows him to mix his blood with liquids to create shape-shifting, nearly invulnerable creatures made of water.^{[ch. 126]} His territory is contained within these creatures that he traps people in to drown. Mitarai is psychologically scarred after watching the Black Chapter videotape and believes that all humans, including himself, are inherently evil and should be wiped out.^{[ch. 127]} He attacks Kuwabara and his friends, but is defeated when Kuwabara regains his aura and acquires the new ability to summon the Dimensional Sword.^{[ch. 127]} Sensui knew Mitarai was weak and uncertain, and therefore had him bugged with a listening device and tried to kill him alongside Hagiri in Yusuke's apartment.^{[ch. 128]} Having been saved by Kuwabara twice and then by Botan, Mitarai rethinks his stance on humans and decides to help in the fight against Sensui.^{[ch. 131]} After the final fight, he lives a normal life and gets into his school of choice. He later devotes his time to environmental and international issues.^{[ch. 154]} He is voiced by Rica Matsumoto in Japanese and by Justin Pate in English.

==== Tsukihito Amanuma/Game Master ====
Voiced by: Yoshiko Kamei (Japanese); Monica Rial (English)

Tsukihito Amanuma (天沼 月人, Amanuma Tsukihito), also known as Game Master (遊熟者(ゲームマスター), Gēmu Masutā), is an eleven-year-old human boy and one of Sensui's comrades. His ability, Game Master, can bring video games to reality, creating them within his territory.^{[ch. 134]} To stall Yusuke and company for as long as possible, he recreates a specific game at Sensui's request that requires seven players and can be replayed until it is won, taking on the role of its main character/antagonist.^{[ch. 136]} However, Kurama informs Amanuma that Sensui took advantage of the child and chose a game in which the antagonist dies if beaten, causing Amanuma to die as well. Shaken, Amanuma loses the final match, and Kurama wins, killing the boy.^{[ch. 137]} However, Amanuma is brought back to life by Koenma's pacifier, just as Sensui intended for him to waste the power.^{[ch. 153]} He later lives a normal life and even makes new friends his age.^{[ch. 154]}

==== Sadao Makihara/Gourmet ====
Voiced by: Atsushi Ishida (Japanese); E. Bailey (English)

Sadao Makihara (巻原 定男, Makihara Sadao), also known as Gourmet (美食家(グルメ), Gurume), is a human and one of Sensui's comrades. His ability, Gourmet, allows him to eat other beings and take their powers as his own. At some point, he devoured Shigeru Murota and the regenerating head of Elder Toguro, but the immortal demon ended up taking over Makihara's body.^{[ch. 138,139]} Thus, he can absorb abilities, read minds, and regenerate. Kurama first chops Makihara's head in half, then captures him/Elder Toguro in a parasitic tree that casts illusions. Due to Elder Toguro's immortality and evil nature, he is stuck fighting Kurama's illusion for eternity.^{[ch. 139]}

=== Demon Plane ===
==== Yomi ====
Voiced by: Masashi Ebara (Japanese); Rick Robertson (Funimation dub), Victor Lee (Animax Asia dub) (English)

Yomi (黄泉) is the youngest of the three demon kings vying for control of the Demon Plane. He was Kurama's second-in-command as a bandit working to build a nation.^{[ch. 162]} Yomi was reckless and brash, and Kurama sent an assassin who blinded him before fleeing. Kurama then left for the Human World and Mukuro, and Raizen rose to power.^{[ch. 162]} Having equaled them in power and with Raizen dying, Yomi plans to take over both the Demon Plane and the Human World. He calls Kurama to aid him and threatens his human family to get him to stay.^{[ch. 162]} After Yusuke proposes the Demon Plane Unification Tournament, Yomi is forced to accept and announce the dissolution of his nation. However, this is initially a bluff until his fighting spirit is roused and he abandons his plans.^{[ch. 166]} In the tournament he defeats his young son Shura (修羅) and Yusuke, before losing to Kokō.

==== Mukuro ====
Voiced by: Minami Takayama (Japanese); Wendy Powell (English)

Mukuro (軀) is one of the three demon kings vying for control of the Demon Plane. She recruits Hiei, who becomes her top warrior. She was born into slavery from a humanoid demon named Chiko, who continuously raped her on her birthday.^{[ch. 173]} After pouring acid on herself at seven years old, Chiko lost interest, and kicked Mukuro out, making her free.^{[ch. 173]} She killed indiscriminately before finding Hiei's lost Tear of Ice jewel, which had the same calming effect on her as it does him.^{[ch. 161]} Despite half her body destroyed, Mukuro rose to prominence equal to Raizen. She quickly accepts Yusuke's proposal of the Demon Plane Unification Tournament, dissolving her nation.^{[ch. 165]} In the tournament, she defeats Hiei before losing to Enki. At the end of the series, Hiei learns that Chiko implanted a single memory of himself being kind into his daughter's mind, which she remembered every time she thought of getting revenge. He also trapped him in a parasitic plant, which he gave to her on her birthday.^{[ch. 173]} In the anime, Mukuro's backstory is changed to exclude the parts about her being a sex slave, and that she was simply an abandoned child found by Chiko and taken in for slavery. Togashi has stated that Mukuro is one of his favorite characters. He had desired to write more about her abuse before the series ended.

==== Raizen ====
Voiced by: Takayuki Sugo (Japanese); Christopher Sabat (English)

Raizen (雷禅) is one of the three demon kings vying for control of the Demon Plane and Yusuke's ancestral father. Nearly 700 years ago, Raizen, then in the Human World, fell in love with a human woman who nursed him back to health after he had been nearly killed by other demons. She was a "cannibal healer", a shaman who ate the flesh of the diseased to create antidotes to the disease with their blood, who taunted him that if he consumed her, he would be killed by her poisonous body.^{[ch. 164]} Raizen immediately falls in love with her; they mate that night, and he vows to himself to never eat human flesh until they meet again. However, they never did, as she died giving birth.^{[ch. 164]} Raizen summons Yusuke to the Demon Plane as he is on the brink of death from starvation and requires someone to take his throne. During Yusuke's fight with Sensui, he momentarily takes over his body to defeat Sensui. He later dies, making Yusuke king of his domain.^{[ch. 164]}

==== Shigure ====
Voiced by: Takashi Taniguchi (Japanese); Pete Webber (English)

Shigure (時雨) is a demon osteopath and one of Mukuro's top warriors. He is the one who gave Hiei his Evil Eye, so that he could find the Ice Maiden's country and his Tear of Ice jewel, and taught him basic swordsmanship.^{[ch. 160]} Shigure only operates on patients who interest him and takes part in their "life existence" as payment, which in Hiei's case was that he could never reveal his relation to Yukina.^{[ch. 160]} Shigure fights Hiei as part of Mukuro's testing of whether Hiei can qualify to be the right-hand man. He wields the large Brimstone Ring Blade (燐火円礫刀, Rinka Enreki-tō; "Phosphorus Ring Sword" in the English anime) that looks like a large hula hoop. In the quick battle, they both lose an arm, but Shigure also loses the top half of his head.^{[ch. 161]} However, Shigure then appears fully healed in the Demon Plane Unification Tournament as an opponent of Kurama, whom he loses to, and is later seen doing patrol work with Hiei at the end of the series.^{[ch. 171,173]} In the anime, after losing to Kurama, he commits suicide, stating that a swordsman never loses twice.

== Other characters ==
=== Atsuko Urameshi ===
Voiced by: Yoko Soumi (Japanese); Meredith McCoy (English)
Portrayed by: Ayumi Ito (TV drama)

Atsuko Urameshi (浦飯 温子, Urameshi Atsuko) is Yusuke's 29-year-old mother.^{[ch. 1]} She is an alcoholic and neglectful mother, whose only known means of making money is by extorting police and yakuza.^{[ch. 7,17]} It is by Yusuke's car accident that she reveals how much she loved him.^{[ch. 1]} While she plays a larger supporting role in the manga, she only appears early on in the anime and the later 2018 All or Nothing OVA special. At the end of the series, she is seen with an ex-boyfriend who works for her, who tries to get back together with her, and who mentions how Yusuke used to jump on him when he hit her, implying it is his father.^{[ch. 174]}

=== Shizuru Kuwabara ===
Voiced by: Ai Orikasa (Japanese); Kasey Buckley (Funimation dub), Andrea Kwan (Animax Asia dub) (English)

Shizuru Kuwabara (桑原 静流, Kuwabara Shizuru) is Kazuma's seventeen-year-old sister. She is an aspiring beautician and has a sixth sense even stronger than her brother's.^{[ch. 14]} It is Shizuru who recommends her brother see master Genkai for advice on the side effects of his sixth sense, getting him caught up in her tournament to find a pupil.^{[ch. 24]} Considerably down to earth and deadpan in most scenes, her role is mainly to act as the tough mother-figure to Kuwabara. Her role grows somewhat during the Dark Tournament. She appears again at the end of the series. However, in the anime she has a brief romantic connection to Sakyo as he saves her numerous times from demon guards at the stadium, and is given his lighter to remember him by as he dies in the stadium's destruction and takes over the role that Yusuke's mother had in the Sensui arc of the manga. Yoshihiro Togashi named Shizuru his favorite female character of the series "because she keeps her cool."

=== Yukina ===
Voiced by: Yuri Shiratori (Japanese); Susan Huber (TV series; Funimation dub, first voice), Jessica Dismuke (TV series; Funimation dub, second voice), Veronica Taylor (second film; Central Park Media dub) (English)
Portrayed by: Ai Mikami (TV drama)

Yukina (雪菜) is an Ice Maiden (氷女, Kōrime) and twin sister of Hiei, although she is unaware of their relation.^{[ch. 160]} As a member of a demonic family of winter spirits, she produces beautiful jewels through her tears.^{[ch. 46]} When she found out her brother was cast from the Ice Kingdom, she escaped to the Human World. For the last five years, Yukina has been held captive by Gonzo Tarukane, a member of the Black Book Club, who has become very wealthy through the jewels he forces her to make.^{[ch. 46]} Eventually she hardens her heart to prevent herself from crying even under extreme torture, prompting Tarukane to hire the Toguro brothers to aid him. As an Underworld Detective mission, Yusuke and Kuwabara succeed in rescuing Yukina from Tarukane's mansion.^{[ch. 50]} Yukina returns to the Dark Tournament to ask Kuwabara (who has a crush on her) and his friends for help finding her brother, and to offer her healing powers.^{[ch. 75]} At the end of the series, Yukina is living with Kuwabara's family as a homestay.^{[ch. 171]}

=== Asato Kido ===
Voiced by: Takehito Koyasu (Japanese); Iman Nazemzadeh (English)

Asato Kido (城戸 亜沙斗, Kido Asato) is a fifteen-year-old human who, along with Yu Kaito and Mitsunari Yanagisawa, kidnaps Yusuke and takes him to the Fourth Dimensional Mansion.^{[ch. 115,120]} They developed superhuman powers as a result of the Demon Plane portal opened by Sensui and Itsuki. He sought the aid of Genkai, who had them attack Yusuke, Kuwabara, Kurama, and Hiei.^{[ch. 119]} Kido's ability is Shadow (影(シャドー), Shadō), which allows him to incapacitate someone by stepping on their shadow.^{[ch. 118]} It is shown that he also has some control over his own shadow, using it to spell out his attacker's name after he is paralyzed by Kamiya.^{[ch. 123]}

=== Yu Kaito ===
Voiced by: Issei Futamata (Japanese); Jackie Cabe (English)

Yu Kaito (海藤 優, Kaitō Yū) is a seventeen-year-old human who, along with Kido and Yanagisawa, kidnaps Yusuke and takes him to the Fourth Dimensional Mansion.^{[ch. 115,120]} Having written several published philosophical papers and books of literary criticism, he is the smartest student at Meio High School, behind only Kurama.^{[ch. 116]} Kido, Yanagisawa, and he developed superhuman powers as a result of the Demon Plane portal opened by Sensui and Itsuki. They sought Genkai's aid, who had them attack Yusuke, Kuwabara, Kurama, and Hiei.^{[ch. 119]} Kaito's ability is Taboo (禁句(タブー), Tabū), which allows him to create a territory where violence is ineffective, and people must not say a taboo word set by him, or their soul will be extracted from their body.^{[ch. 116]} Although he succeeds in capturing the souls of Hiei, Kuwabara, and Botan, he is outplayed by Kurama.^{[ch. 117]} His last appearance shows him spending his weekend playing video games and writing.^{[ch. 174]}

=== Mitsunari Yanagisawa ===
Voiced by: Mitsuaki Madono (Japanese); Travis Willingham (English)

Mitsunari Yanagisawa (柳沢 光成, Yanagisawa Mitsunari) is a sixteen-year-old human who, along with Kido and Kaito, kidnaps Yusuke and takes him to the Fourth Dimensional Mansion.^{[ch. 115,120]} They developed superhuman powers as a result of the Demon Plane portal opened by Sensui and Itsuki. They sought the aid of Genkai, who had them attack Yusuke, Kuwabara, Kurama, and Hiei.^{[ch. 119]} Yanagisawa's ability is Copy (模写(コピー), Kopī), which allows him to copy the appearance, personality, memories, and aura print of anyone he touches.^{[ch. 118]} In his last appearance, he is thinking about using his ability on an attractive girl to learn everything about her, and it is revealed that ten years later, he marries the other girl who tries to cheer him up.^{[ch. 174]}

=== Pu ===
Voiced by: Yuri Shiratori (Japanese); Justin Cook (English)

Pu (ぷう, Pū; "Puu" in the English anime) or Pusuke (ぷう助, Pūsuke) is Yusuke's underworld beast. To return to life, Koenma gives Yusuke a Spirit Beast egg. As Yusuke traveled with Botan as a ghost, it would feed off of his aura and hatch into a creature whose form and demeanor would depend on how pure Yusuke's actions were. After using all the energy he had accumulated to save Keiko from a fire, Yusuke was returned to his body through an alternate method, while the egg was stored in the Underworld by Koenma. During the semifinals of the Dark Tournament, the egg hatches into Pu, a small penguin-like animal with large floppy ears used to fly, a beak, and black hair on his head.^{[ch. 76]} Yusuke is embarrassed to get such a cute spirit beast but is endeared to Pu after it helps him during Genkai's final discipleship test. After Sensui kills Yusuke and Yusuke revives as a demon, Pu changes into a large bird, resembling a phoenix.^{[ch. 149]} Pu came in ninth place in the series' second popularity poll.

=== Jorge Saotome ===
Voiced by: Tomomichi Nishimura (Japanese); Kent Williams (TV series and first film; Funimation dub), Robert Martin Klein (first film; Anime Works dub) (English)

Jorge Saotome (ジョルジュ早乙女, Joruju Saotome), also spelled "George" in the Anime Works English dub of the first film, is an ogre and one of Koenma's underlings that only appears in the anime. Koenma often blames him for any problems that happen, most often problems that Koenma causes himself. While Jorge attempts to act as the voice of reason most of the time, he rarely gets praised for it. In the second-to-last episode, it is revealed that the anime series was an underworld file on Yusuke Urameshi with Jorge as the narrator. He then goes back to hating his job as Koenma's aide.

=== Koto, Juri and Luka ===
==== Koto ====
Voiced by: Ai Orikasa (Japanese); Amber Cotton (English)

Koto (小兎), who resembles a fox or cat, is the initial referee/announcer for the Dark Tournament. She takes the rules of the tournament seriously, and even mildly protests the tournament committee's underhanded manipulations.

==== Juri ====
Voiced by: Katsuyo Endou (Japanese); Jamie Marchi (English)

In the semifinals, Juri (樹里), who resembles an amphibian, takes over as referee while Koto gives the play-by-play commentary.^{[ch. 79]}

==== Luka ====
Voiced by: Chiharu Suzuka (Japanese); Laurie Steele (English)

Luka (瑠架, Ruka; alternately "Ruka") is a demon who specializes in force fields and is the nurse at the Dark Tournament. At the direction of the tournament organizers, she keeps Hiei and the Masked Fighter from competing in Team Urameshi's round against Team Shadow Channelers under the false guise of them being medically unfit.^{[ch. 67]} At the end of the series, all three become widely popular idols on human television together under the name the "Occult Threesome".^{[ch. 172]}

=== Kirishima, Okubo and Sawamura ===
Kirishima
Voiced by: Mitsuaki Madono (Japanese); Chris Cason (English)
Okubo
Voiced by: Hidenari Ugaki (Japanese); Kyle Hebert (English)
Sawamura
Voiced by: Eiji Sekiguchi (Japanese); Mike McFarland (English)
Portrayed by: Keiichiro Azuma (TV drama)

Kirishima (桐島; "Miyamoto" in the English anime), Okubo (大久保, Ōkubo) and Sawamura (沢村; "Komada" in the English anime) are Kazuma's friends and also allies of Yusuke Urameshi. Okubo's single mother, often ill, does not earn enough money for her household, so Okubo works to support his family.^{[ch. 3]} All three appear in the Sensui arc where they attend a Megallica concert with Kuwabara. On their way home, they are attacked by Kiyoshi Mitarai and nearly drown in one of his water-based creatures, but are saved by Kuwabara.^{[ch. 127]} Afterwards, Kuwabara carries the three, along with Mitarai, to Yusuke's apartment before passing out. After Kirishima, Okubo, and Sawamura tell Kurama and the others about what happened, their memories are erased.^{[ch. 127]} Kirishima came in ninth place in the series' first popularity poll. He came in eleventh in the American Shonen Jump poll.

=== Shigeru Murota ===
Voiced by: Nobuaki Fukuda (Japanese); Sean Schemmel (English)

Shigeru Murota (室田繁, Murota Shigeru) is a human whose ability Wiretap (盗聴(タッピング), Tappingu), allows him to read people's minds. He can hear the thoughts of anyone within his range, and the more emotional, the louder he hears them. Murota plans to use this power to become a professional boxer by anticipating attacks to avoid them easily.^{[ch. 121]} He is confronted by Yusuke and friends while looking for the person responsible for the Demon Plane portal. After being easily defeated by Yusuke, Murota helps them identify Sensui as the mastermind in a crowd via Wiretap.^{[ch. 121]} He is then injured by Hagiri and taken to the hospital where Kamiya is, and is infected by one of Kamiya's virus insects.^{[ch. 122]} It is later revealed that Murota was consumed by Gourmet.^{[ch. 138]}
