= Sean Michael Teague =

American voice actor

- Born: December 19, 1970 (age 54); Houston, Texas, U.S.
- Other names: Sean Teague
- Occupations: Voice actor; ADR director
- Years active: 2001–present
- Website: http://www.sequelcentral.net/

Sean Michael Teague (born December 19, 1970, in Houston, Texas) is an American voice actor and ADR script writer. He has provided voices for a number of English-language versions of Japanese anime films and television series.

Teague is involved in many varied projects which speak to his love and passion for all aspects of the entertainment industry. For example, on October 10, 2010, he launched his first website, Sequel Central, which is designed as a news and information site for Hollywood film franchises including sequels, prequels, spinoffs, reboots, remakes, and adaptations.

== Filmography ==
=== Anime ===
- Bamboo Blade - Danjūrō Eiga
- BECK: Mongolian Chop Squad - Kigata (Ep. 20)
- Big Windup! - Ren Mihashi
- Birdy the Mighty Decode: 02 - Yang (Ep. 3)
- Case Closed - Michael Stewart, others (FUNimation dub)
- Corpse Princess - Sumitori
- Dragon Ball series - Uub
- Dragon Ball Z Kai - Uub
- Fairy Tail - Uosuke
- The Galaxy Railways - Ohyama (Ep. 16)
- Jormungand: Perfect Order - Maurice
- Jyu Oh Sei - Thor Klein (Teen)
- Karneval - Nai
- Last Exile: Fam, the Silver Wing - Lucciola
- The Legend of the Legendary Heroes - Shuss Shiraz
- Michiko & Hatchin - Lenine (Ep. 15)
- Nobunagun - Antoni Gaudi
- Oh! Edo Rocket - Shinza
- Ōkami-san and her Seven Companions - Hansel
- One Piece - Dip (Ep. 101), Race (FUNimation dub)
- Peach Girl - Yujio
- Ping Pong: The Animation - Mōri
- Romeo x Juliet - Benvolio
- Samurai 7 - Okamoto Katsushiro
- Save Me! Lollipop - Nanase
- Sekirei: Pure Engagement - Ashikabi Escapee (Ep. 1)
- Sengoku Basara: Samurai Kings - Harukichi (Ep. 13)
- Sengoku Basara: Samurai Kings 2 - Miyamoto Musashi
- Shakugan no Shana II - Yuri Chvojka
- Shigurui: Death Frenzy - Suzunosuke Kondou
- Soul Eater - Boy (Ep. 11)
- Toriko - Fond de Buono
- Trinity Blood - Wilhelm
- Yu Yu Hakusho - Koenma

== Production credits ==
=== Script Adaptation ===
- All Purpose Cultural Cat Girl Nuku Nuku DASH!
- AM Driver
- B'tX
- Baki the Grappler
- BECK: Mongolian Chop Squad
- Beet the Vandel Buster
- Case Closed
- Dragon Ball (series)
- Negima!
- One Piece
- Ouran High School Host Club
- Shuffle!
- Slayers Return
- SoltyRei
- The Tower of Druaga (TV series)
- Trinity Blood
- xxxHolic
