= Ten de Shōwaru Cupid =

Japanese manga series by Yoshihiro Togashi

- Cover of the first volume

てんで性悪キューピッド (Ten de Shōwaru Kyūpiddo)
- Genre: Romantic comedy
- Manga
- Written by: Yoshihiro Togashi
- Published by: Shueisha
- Imprint: Jump Comics
- Magazine: Weekly Shōnen Jump
- Original run: July 24, 1989 – March 12, 1990
- Volumes: 4

Ten de Shōwaru Cupid (Japanese: てんで性悪キューピッド, Hepburn: Ten de Shōwaru Kyūpiddo; lit. 'An Ill-tempered Cupid in Heaven') is a Japanese romantic comedy manga series written and illustrated by Yoshihiro Togashi. It was serialized in the Shueisha magazine Weekly Shōnen Jump from 1989 to 1990.

== Plot ==
The storyline of Ten de Shōwaru Cupid follows Ryuji Koinobori (鯉昇 竜次), a sweet and introverted 15-year-old who lives with his four stepsisters and their father, the leader of the Koinobori yakuza and promiscuous playboy by heritage, just like his own father, grandfather, and so on. Ryuji's family has a tendency to make fun of his innocent nature, causing the boy to continuously try to run away from home. After escaping one day, Ryuji witnesses a beautiful girl with a devil tail bathing in a forest pool. Embarrassed, Ryuji returns to his home only to be confronted by girl the following day. As it turns out, this devil girl named Maria was hired by Ryuji's father to live with them in order to teach his son "the pleasures of the flesh" and make him follow in the family's perverted footsteps.

== Characters ==
Ryuji Koinobori (鯉昇 竜次)
The protagonist of this work. He's the heir to the Koinobori-gumi of the Kanto Daigoku yakuza syndicate and a third-year student at Gokuraku Junior High. Although he's in a position to inherit a yakuza family, he has no intention or spirit to do so (according to Tatsuzo later, it's apparently "because his mother left all the childcare to others"). He's pure and longs for fairies and fairytales. He's an irregular existence, arguably the only one born into the Koinobori family without an "evil soul." He's lost interest in real women because he's seen his sisters constantly look down on him and be too insensitive. He has a habit of running away from home frequently, but he always returns quickly.
His life is disrupted by Maria, who comes to his home for his rehabilitation, and he gradually becomes attracted to her.
He's a member of the art club and has drawn many pictures of his ideal fairy, which he also displays in his room. He's usually an uninspired boy, but once he gets angry (or drinks alcohol or escapes reality), his perverted and violent true nature emerges. In this state, even Maria can't handle him.
Maria Hijiri (聖 まりあ)
The heroine of this work. She moves into the Koinobori household to turn Ryuji, who has absolutely no interest in real women, into a full-fledged pervert. Her true identity is that of a low-ranking demon who trades human souls. She has a tail, wings, and horns, and can use spells. When living in the human world, these are hidden by a secret medicine and spells, but they appear when she's bathing or sleeping.
Her personality is more mischievous than innocent. Deceiving others is second nature to her (her main victim is Ryuji). She has no qualms about exposing herself in her underwear or even naked. She boldly showed her naked body upon their first meeting. However, she also has a timid side and is terribly afraid of ghosts. She even faints during a test of courage. She also doesn't seem to be very strong against tickling, as she laughed hysterically when restrained and tickled by Kenta Kanekura (mentioned later).
She transfers to the same Gokuraku Junior High as Ryuji, disrupting his school life as well. However, she's an excellent student, ranking first in her grade in the midterm exams. Due to her beauty and talent, she gains considerable popularity within the school. Because of this, she causes and gets involved in trouble.
According to Jiva (mentioned later), as a "low-ranking demon, she's close to humans and easily affected by human emotions," and originally "there were times when she strangely lacked malice for a demon," making her a very human-like existence.
Her three sizes are B85, W58, H85. Her nipple color is pink (according to her). Her maximum MP is 45. She has a habit of using spells anywhere and often runs out of magic power. Spells she can use are mentioned later.

=== Koinobori-gumi ===
All siblings have different mothers. The sisters have good relationships with each other, while the relationship between the sisters and Ryuji is quite bad (all of them look down on Ryuji to varying degrees).
Tatsuzo Koinobori (鯉昇 竜蔵)
The head of the Koinobori-gumi and Ryuji's father. 43 years old. He's a giant with messy hair and beard, and a large scar on his cheek (given by a cat). Since he was 15, he was feared by delinquents as "Enma's Tatsuzo," and he had affairs with as many as 100 women. The "evil soul" passed down through generations of the Koinobori family is said to be as valuable as a supreme jewel in the demonic world, and this applies to Tatsuzo as well. He's troubled by Ryuji's ineptitude as an heir, so he hired and housed Maria as a perverted "private tutor". Despite being extraordinarily lecherous, he never lays a hand on Maria.
On the other hand, he's overprotective of his daughters, preventing any "bugs" from coming near them. He also has biased views (people who don't speak Japanese are Americans, he dislikes cats because he can't communicate with them, etc.).
Tatsuko Koinobori (鯉昇 竜子)
The eldest daughter of the Koinobori family. 24 years old. A high school teacher. However, she loves alcohol and cigarettes, and has gone drinking with her students and gotten them all drunk, making her an extremely problematic teacher. Her mother is "the granddaughter of the Kanto Daigoku Rengokai Chairman", and due to her yakuza bloodline, she has an old-fashioned side. Among the sisters, she most overtly looks down on Ryuji.
Tatsue Koinobori (鯉昇 竜江)
The second daughter of the Koinobori family. 17 years old. A high school student. Her mother is "a woman born in Osaka". She's Kansai-style and usually wears a sarashi (a traditional Japanese cloth wrapped around the chest). She's very quick to pick fights and is physically strong. When she fights, she seems to lose all control, even attacking the audience and knocking them all down. Because of this, she despises Ryuji as a weakling.
Slayer Tatsumi Koinobori (鯉昇 スレイヤー・竜美)
The third daughter of the Koinobori family. 14 years old. Her mother is "an American delinquent girl", making her a half-American. She has a slightly skewed view of Japan. Among the four sisters, she's the most sexually unrestrained, and according to the special chapter "The Wicked Cupid After That", she aims to have a thousand boyfriends in her lifetime and is currently looking for her 101st. Like Tatsuko, she directly disparages Ryuji.
Tatsuno Koinobori (鯉昇 竜乃)
The fourth daughter of the Koinobori family. 10 years old. A fourth-grader. Her mother is a "Kabukicho playgirl". She's the youngest but very responsible, taking care of all the housework for the Koinobori family. She's the most sensible of the four and gets along well with Tatsumi and Maria, but she unconsciously looks down on her brother, Ryuji.

=== Gokuraku Junior High ===
Tatsuo Kito (紀藤 辰男)
Ryuji's bad friend #1. His hair is tied back. His family runs a greengrocer. His name is a pun on "gaitou" (glans) and "tatsu" (to stand, referring to an erection).
Seishiro Kakisugi (柿杉 精四郎)
Ryuji's bad friend #2. Wears glasses. He once fell in love with Maria's disguised form. His name is a pun on "kakisugi" (over-masturbation) and "seishi" (sperm).
Shiro Makai (魔境 四郎)
Levi's disguised form in the human world. He has black hair and wears glasses, appearing intellectual. Due to the effect of a certain demon world item, he's favored by the principal and has gained considerable status within the school.
Nao Mayumi (真弓 菜緒)
The Madonna of the class next to Ryuji's. She approaches Ryuji, but it's because Maria possessed her, which led to Ryuji being isolated in his class, with even his homeroom teacher not helping him.
Ichiro Rakugaki (楽垣)
Also a member of the art club with Ryuji. He has the talent to find models exactly as Ryuji requests and to finish uniform paintings on the spot. He's interested in the female body.
Ushiko Yonezawa (米沢 牛子), Yuko Roppongi (六本木 遊子), Yogayo Takojima (蛸島 ヨガ代)
Female students chosen by Shiro Makai as Ryuji's partners for the sports festival. However, they were abducted by someone just before the competition, breaking up the pair.
Uke Todai (東大 受)
He had the top grades in his year until Maria transferred. Because of this, he held a grudge against Maria and engaged in voyeurism (under the guise of studying and to set her up). He has an anachronistic sense of style, wearing a rising sun headband and ninja attire. He took a picture of Maria's true form while she was bathing but was beaten up by yakuza members and had his photo confiscated. He tried to expose Maria's secret at the morning assembly the next day, but his memory had been lost due to shock.
Kenta Kanekura (金倉 健太)
A student in a different class from Ryuji and Maria. He shares the same birthday as Ryuji. He's the grandson of the Kanekura Group president and the richest student in the school, with a monthly allowance of about 30 million yen. He's handsome and holds many qualifications.
On the other hand, he's a dangerous individual who, on each birthday, targets the most beautiful girl of the year and satisfies his desires (he says he's "returning to his childhood").
In the story, for his birthday that year, he targeted the highly-regarded Maria and invited her to a party, using a requested art book for Ryuji as bait. After putting Maria to sleep with a sleeping pill, he tied her to an operating table in the basement in an X-shaped crucifixion. With Maria helpless due to lack of magic power, he unilaterally played a perverted doctor game, gradually cutting her dress with a scalpel, tracing and teasing her soft skin with the scalpel while stripping her naked, leaving her with only one pair of panties remaining. When Maria showed an angry expression at being toyed with, he fearlessly and teasingly tickled her side. This had a tremendous effect, with Maria shaking her head and begging for mercy, exhausting herself. After enjoying the tickling, he finally cut one side of her panties, bringing her one step away from complete nakedness and greatly humiliating her. However, just as he was about to finish, a drunken and transformed Ryuji burst in and knocked him out with one blow.
Chisato (千里)
Initially misunderstood to be in love with Ryuji, she's actually a lesbian underclassman who harbors an admiration, akin to romantic feelings, for Maria. She actively approaches Maria and tries to form a sisterly bond. Even when witnessing Ryuji and Maria's couple-like actions, she interprets them in a way convenient to herself.

=== Yakuza-related individuals ===
Daisuke Momoshiri (桃尻大助)
The heir to the Tohoku Momoshiri-gumi and Ryuji's childhood friend. He was raised to be solely focused on studying, with a dream of becoming a politician. He was an honor student with a bob haircut, thick glasses, and always carrying reference books, but upon their reunion, he had become rebellious, growing into a full-fledged delinquent who loved cigarettes and women (the reason being his yakuza father doing as he pleased while forcing him to study constantly). He's quick to adapt, playing the role of an honor student to deceive those around him, and then attacking them when they let their guard down like a beast. He repeatedly targets Maria, but misunderstands her true identity and Ryuji's feelings, leading to his coming out.
Kikuo Momoshiri (桃尻菊夫)
The head of the Momoshiri-gumi and Tatsuzo's old friend. He's a famous womanizer and a pervert who tries to make advances on Tatsuzo's daughters. On the other hand, he's a tiger dad who raised his son, Daisuke, to be a (ostensibly) bookworm. He prefers strong-willed women and, like his son, targets Maria, only to run into Daisuke who had revealed his true nature at the scene. He accepts that "the apple doesn't fall far from the tree" and reconciles.
Shuei family (集英一家)
A yakuza family with a leader dressed like a pirate captain and a prodigal son. They don't get along with the Koinobori-gumi and engage in a karuta game that's like a fight to the death. The son's preferences are abnormal; he liked Ryuji when he was cross-dressing.

=== Demons ===
Levi (レヴィ)
Head of the Planning Department, Japan Branch of the Demon World Soul Bank. He's Maria's boss and a middle-ranking demon. He's quite handsome and loves Maria, but she's completely indifferent to him. He's a narcissist and is always naked under his cape. He's somewhat naive and easily manipulated by Maria.
He's obliterated by Jiva but revives as a fly. He's apparently "going to be like this for about 50 years."
Maya Kuroki (黒木 マヤ)
A half-breed of demon and vampire. She's Maria's rival. She has a deep voice and speaks like a man. She moves next door to the Koinobori family to compete with Maria. She pretends to be a demure woman and tries to trick Ryuji.
Although her plan ultimately fails, she seems to have had lingering feelings, as there's a scene where she asks Ryuji, "Won't you switch to me even now?" after her true nature is exposed.
Miko Hoshino (星野 ミコ)
A witch who uses crystals. She publishes highly accurate fortunes in magazines. She's Maya's best friend and gives a false fortune to separate Maria and Ryuji.
Jiva (ジヴァ)
Maria's lover in the demon world. He's a handsome man with an unyielding calm expression, claiming to be "evil itself". Even the courageous Tatsuzo shudders, saying, "This is the first time I've been so scared; he's an incredible villain." His abilities are also extremely high; he can completely obliterate a middle-ranking demon like Levi and erase others' memories. He appears in the human world to take Maria back.
However, Maria had already been too influenced by the human world, having acquired emotions that demons shouldn't possess, which made her unable to return to the demon world.
Jiva uses his power to transform Maria into a complete human, ultimately becoming the "crooked cupid" (as Levi calls them) for the two.
He genuinely loved Maria, and according to the special chapter "The Wicked Cupid After That", he apparently embarked on a journey due to heartbreak and is now missing.

== Production ==
Ten de Shōwaru Cupid was the first of manga by author Yoshihiro Togashi serialized in the Shueisha magazine Weekly Shōnen Jump. A few years prior to conceiving it, Togashi had created several one shots featured in the same magazine. Togashi produced manuscripts for Ten de Shōwaru Cupid within his Tokyo apartment when it started serialization during the summer of 1989. He began hiring assistants after the first few chapters of the manga's run. Togashi used his weekly messages to fans to recruit assistants by encouraging readers to send in their best work to his Shuiesha editor Toshinaga Takahashi. Togashi's younger brother, another prospective mangaka, would also help out occasionally. Towards the finale of its serialization, Togashi realized that there would not be enough chapters to fill the fourth and final tankōbon volume of manga and that it would be 50 to 100 pages too short. To remedy this, Shueisha included two of his earlier works: Sensē wa Toshishita!! and Jura no Miduki. In the last volume, Togashi also addressed plot holes, such as Ryuyi's middle school age or the fate of the characters Kakisugi and Kitou, by telling fans not to read too deeply into the story.

Years after its conclusion, Togashi has admitted he considers Ten de Shōwaru Cupid a failure and that writing romantic comedy was beyond his capabilities. Having been given an opportunity to serialize his first major work within such a prominent publication, he was embarrassed that he found it so extremely difficult to produce it week after week. In addition, he felt intimidated by many of his more popular contemporaries within Weekly Shōnen Jump and that he was struggling to compete for the reader poll votes necessary to keep the series afloat. He eventually lost his desire to continue Ten de Shōwaru Cupid. After ending it in early 1990, Togashi was anxious and excited to begin working on another manga that better expressed his own interests. This came in the form of the supernatural, fighting manga series Yu Yu Hakusho, which began its serialization late that same year.

== Publication ==
Ten de Shōwaru Cupid was serialized in Shueisha's Weekly Shōnen Jump from its 32nd issue in 1989 to its 13th issue in 1990. The chapters were collected into four tankōbon volumes between January and November 1990. A wide-ban re-release was published in three volumes from March 18 to May 19, 1994. Finally, a bunkoban (pocket) version was published in two volumes on November 15, 2002.

=== Chapters ===
No.	Title	Release date	ISBN
1	"A Naked Demon!" (ハダカの悪魔！, Hadaka no Akuma!)	January 1990	978-4088716718
01. "A Naked Demon!" (ハダカの悪魔！, Hadaka no Akuma!); 02. "An Old Man, Lady!" (オヤジの女！, Oyaji no On'na!); 03. "The Wonderful Date!" (素敵なデート！, Sutekina dēto!); 04. "Dangerous Buttocks!" (危険なオシリ！, Kiken'na Oshiri!); 05. "Crime and Punishment!" (罪と罰！, Tsumitobachi!); 06. "The Night I Was Bewitched!" (魅せられた夜！, Miserare ta Yoru!); 07. "The Beach is Paradise!" (渚はパラダイス！, Nagisa wa Paradaisu!); 08. "After 6 Years...!" (6年たったら…！, 6-Nen Tattara…!); 09. "After 6 Years...!" (6年たったら…！, 6-Nen Tattara…!)
2	"The Lady of Fascination!" (魅惑の淑女！, Miwaku no Shukujo!)	April 1990	978-4088716725
10. "Temptation of an Angel!" (天使の誘惑！, Tenshi no Yūwaku!); 11. "Bow and Arrow of an Angel!" (天使の弓矢！, Tenshi no Yumiya!); 12. "Sweet Memory!" (甘い記憶！, Amai Kioku!); 13. "Random Cuisine!" (料理はおまかせ！, Ryōri wa Omakase!); 14. "Sports Day of the Storm!" (嵐の運動会！, Arashi no Undōkai!); 15. "Peeping is Useless!" (のぞきはダメよ！, Nozoki wa Dameyo!); 16. "Dream of Invitation!" (夢の招待状！, Yume no Jōtaijō!); 17. "Maria's Desperate Situation!" (まりあ絶体絶命！, Maria Zettaizetsumei!); 18. "The Lady of Fascination!" (魅惑の淑女！, Miwaku no Shukujo!)
3	"Wish Upon a Star!" (星に願いを！, Hoshi Ni Negai Wo)	July 1990	978-4088716732
19. "I Want Blood!" (血が欲しい！, Chi ga Hoshī!); 20. "Sleepless Room!" (眠れない部屋！, Nemurenai Heya!); 21. "Lover of Illusion!" (幻の恋人！, Maboroshi no Koibito!); 22. "Forbidden Love!" (禁断の恋！, Kindan no Koi!); 23. "White Blossom Shower!" (白い花吹雪！, Shiroi Hanafubuki!); 24. "Muzzled Strategy!" (口止め大作戦！, Kuchidome Dai Sakusen!); 25. "The Worst Day!" (最悪の日！, Saiaku no Hi!); 26. "Karuta Tournament of Fear!" (恐怖のカルタ大会！, Kyōfu no Karuta Taikai!); 27. "Wish Upon a Star!" (星に願いを！, Hoshi Ni Negai Wo!)
4	"And Again!" (そして再び！, Soshite Futatabi!)	November 1990	978-4088716749
28. "Stray Cat Extravaganza!" (捨て猫狂想曲！, Sute Neko Kyōsōkyoku!); 29. "Demon World Lover!" (魔界の恋人！, Makai no Koibito!); 30. "The Time of Return!" (帰還の時！, Kikan no Toki!); 31. "A Mournful Farewell!" (別れの挽歌！, Wakare no Banka!); 32. "And Again!" (そして再び！, Soshite Futatabi!); "The New Special Rewrite: Ten de Shōwaru Cupid" (特別書き下ろし その後のてんで性悪キューピッド, Tokubetsu Kakioroshi Sonogo no Ten de Shōwaru Kyūpiddo); "Special Shot: Jura no Miduki" (特別読み切り ジュラのミヅキ, Tokubetsu Yomikiri Jura no Miduki); "Special Shot: Sensē wa Toshishita!!" (特別読み切り センセーは年下!!, Tokubetsu Yomikiri Sensē wa Toshishita!!)
