= Sanae Miyuki =

Japanese voice actress (born 1959)

- 深雪 さなえ
- Born: April 2, 1959 (age 67); Kōriyama, Fukushima Prefecture, Japan
- Other name: Miyuki Muroi
- Occupation: Voice actress
- Years active: 1980–present
- Agent: 81 Produce

Sanae Miyuki (深雪 さなえ, Miyuki Sanae; born April 2, 1959) is a Japanese voice actress. Her previous stage name was Miyuki Muroi (室井 深雪, Muroi Miyuki; alternatively 室井 美雪).

== Anime roles ==
- Akuma-kun (Hyakume)
- Bubblegum Crash (Street Kid (episode 2))
- Chimpui (Hotaru Fujino)
- Crayon Shin-chan: Henderland no Daibouken (Chokiriinu Besuta)
- Dream Hunter Rem (Alpha)
- Genesis Climber Mospeada (Mint Labule)
- Karuizawa Syndrome (Kumiko Kinoshita)
- Lady Lady!! (Lynn Russell)
- Magic Knight Rayearth (Hikari (episode 8))
- Mahou no Angel Sweet Mint (Bell; Bobby)
- Maison Ikkoku (Etsuko)
- New Dream Hunter Rem (OAV) (Alpha)
- Nightwalker (woman)
- Ninku the Movie (Fake Rihoko)
- Norimono Oukoku BuBu ChaCha (Megu)
- O-bake no... Holly (Stinky)
- Obake no Q-Tarō (Yoshiko; Miko Koizumi)
- Oedo wa Nemurenai! (OAV) (Kotetsu)
- Psycho Armor Govarian (Layla)
- Rainbow Brite (Rainbow Brite)
- Story of the Alps: My Annette (Daniel Burnier)
- Super Dimension Century Orguss (Mhoohm)
- Super Dimension Fortress Macross (Shammy Milliome)
- The Adventures of Scamper the Penguin (Pepe)
- The Mischievous Twins (Doris)
- Tokimeki Tonight (Rinze)
- Transformers: Masterforce (Girl (episode 5))
- Yu Yu Hakusho (Botan)
- Yume no Hoshi no Button Nose (Button Nose)

== Live-Action Roles ==
- Seijuu Sentai Gingaman (Bokku)

== Other voice-over work ==
- Strange Days (Iris)
