= Yoshihiro Togashi =

Japanese manga artist (born 1966)

- 冨樫 義博
- Born: April 27, 1966 (age 60); Shinjō, Yamagata, Japan
- Occupation: Manga artist
- Spouse: Naoko Takeuchi (m. 1999)
- Children: 2
- Writing career
- Years active: 1986–present
- Subject: Shōnen manga
- Notable works: YuYu Hakusho; Level E; Hunter × Hunter
- Notable awards: Tezuka Award (1986); Shogakukan Manga Award (1993)

Yoshihiro Togashi (Japanese: 冨樫 義博, Hepburn: Togashi Yoshihiro; born April 27, 1966) is a Japanese manga artist. He began drawing manga at an early age and was recognized for his talent by the publishing company Shueisha while attending college. Togashi has authored several different manga series in different genres since the 1980s. He is best known for writing and illustrating YuYu Hakusho (1990–1994) and Hunter × Hunter (1998–present), which are two of the best-selling manga series of all time. Togashi is married to Naoko Takeuchi, the author of Sailor Moon.

== Biography ==
=== Early life ===
Togashi was Born in Shinjō, Yamagata to a family that owned a paper shop, Togashi began drawing manga casually in his first or second year of elementary school. In high school, Togashi joined the fine-arts club, and he later enrolled at Yamagata University, where he studied education in the hope of becoming a teacher. During college, he submitted some of his manga work to Weekly Young Jump, published by Shueisha. In 1986, at age 20, he authored a manga titled Buttobi Straight (ぶっとびストレート, Buttobi Sutorēto) for which he received the Tezuka Award, the most prestigious award for new comic artists in Japan. Another manga by Togashi, titled Jura no Mizuki (ジュラのミヅキ), was an honorable mention in Shueisha's first annual Hop Step Award Selection magazine, published in 1988. After having given up his goal of becoming a teacher, Togashi was contacted by an editor of Weekly Shōnen Jump during his senior year of college, who asked him to move to Tokyo.

=== Career ===
Togashi's earliest published works for Shueisha include Ōkami Nante Kowakunai!! (狼なんて怖くない!!; lit. I'm Not Afraid of the Wolf!!), a collection of comedy manga short-stories. Weekly Shōnen Jump published some of the stories prior to a tankōbon release in 1989. Between 1989 and 1990, Togashi authored Ten de Shōwaru Cupid, a four-volume romance manga depicting the relationship between a normal human boy and a beautiful devil girl.

In 1990, Togashi made a name for himself with his next series, YuYu Hakusho. Based on his interests in the occult and horror films, the plot features the character Yusuke Urameshi, who is killed and brought back to life as an "Underworld Detective". The manga, which lasted 175 chapters over 19 tankōbon from 1990 to 1994, went on to sell over 78 million copies worldwide, earned Togashi a Shogakukan Manga Award in 1994, and received a hit anime adaptation. In 1995, he created Level E, a science fiction-comedy manga. Comprising three volumes, it was first published in Weekly Shōnen Jump in 1995 and ran until 1997. Level E was adapted into an anime television series in 2011.

Togashi's next major manga series, Hunter × Hunter, began serialization in 1998. The story revolves around the protagonist Gon Freecss, a young boy searching for his father, a legendary, elite member of society called a "Hunter". This manga also performed very well commercially, with the first 20 volumes selling nearly 55 million copies in Japan as of August 2011. It has 84 million copies in circulation as of July 4, 2022. In 2008, Togashi tied with One Piece author Eiichiro Oda as the fifth favorite manga artist from a poll posted by the marketing research firm Oricon.

In 2017, Togashi wrote the two-chapter manga Akuten Wars (悪天ウォーズ). It was illustrated by Hachi Mizuno and published in the September and November issues of Grand Jump Premium.

== Personal life ==
Togashi is married to Naoko Takeuchi, the creator of Sailor Moon. The two were introduced at a party hosted by Kazushi Hagiwara in August 1997. The following year, Takeuchi assisted Togashi for a short time by adding screentone to his manga Hunter × Hunter. Togashi and Takeuchi got married on January 6, 1999. In attendance for the ceremony were several fellow manga artists and voice actors from both the Sailor Moon and YuYu Hakusho anime series. The couple have two children and have collaborated on a children's book titled Oobo— Nu— Tochiibo— Nu— (おおぼーぬーとちぃぼーぬー), which Takeuchi wrote and Togashi illustrated.

Togashi enjoys board-game-style video games and bowling with his family. He also likes watching horror movies, and considers Don't Look Up and Dawn of the Dead his favorites. Togashi cites visual effects designer H. R. Giger as a major influence. Togashi suffered from an immense amount of stress while working on YuYu Hakusho, which caused him inconsistent sleep patterns and chest pain. On March 29, 2011, Togashi and his fellow manga artists posted messages on the official Shōnen Jump website in support of the victims of the 2011 Tōhoku earthquake and tsunami. He has a younger brother named Hideaki Togashi, who is also a manga artist. The Togashi Paper Store run by his mother is still open in Shinjō, Yamagata.

On May 24, 2022, Togashi created a Twitter account, @Un4v5s8bgsVk9Xp, that was later verified to be legitimate by Shueisha. He gained over one million followers in one day, and two million in 72 hours. He is the most-followed manga artist on the platform, with over three million followers. He posts status updates on his work on Hunter × Hunter on Twitter on an irregular basis.

For years, he has been suffering from chronic back issues, leading to several hiatuses spanning multiple years. Due to these issues, he is only able to draw sporadically and only while lying down.

== Style ==
Manga critic Jason Thompson stated that "Togashi is no ordinary mangaka; he does things his own way", further noting that Togashi's first one-shots were a mix of school comedy and "splatter-film horror references". At age 24, Togashi created a hit with the supernatural fighting comedy YuYu Hakusho. Then, rather than continue the series for as long as possible to maximize his profit, Togashi ended the series abruptly. He then created the "0% fighting and 100% humor" science-fiction horror manga Level E.

Togashi's style of artwork began with screentone but gradually developed into minimalism. Both Rika Takahashi of EX.org and Claude J. Pelletier of Protoculture Addicts found the art style in Hunter × Hunter much simpler than YuYu Hakusho and Level E. Thompson noted that artwork during Hunter × Hunter's magazine run is often "sketchy" and missing backgrounds, but Togashi goes back and fixes it for its collected tankōbon release. He also wrote that Togashi has a love of gore and noted that some panels in Hunter × Hunter are apparently censored for gore, being covered with screentone.

Since 2006, Togashi has taken numerous lengthy hiatuses while serializing Hunter × Hunter. Some were due to illness and lower back pain, while reasons for others were never disclosed. In 2012, Thompson speculated that Togashi's slow output was "because he's a perfectionist who enjoys his work and wants to do things himself", noting that his assistants could potentially be called upon further. In his 2017 book Sensei Hakusho, which recounts his work as Togashi's assistant from 1990 to 1997, Kunio Ajino stated that Togashi was unusually generous to his staff. In July 2022, Togashi revealed that he was unable to sit in a chair for two years due to his back and hip problems, but was able to resume drawing by doing so while lying down.

Manga artists Nobuhiro Watsuki and Pink Hanamori have cited Togashi and YuYu Hakusho as an influence. He is one of the favorite artists of Naruto author Masashi Kishimoto. Jujutsu Kaisen author Gege Akutami named Togashi as an influence and was inspired by YuYu Hakusho and Hunter × Hunter.

== Works ==
=== Manga ===
- Sensēha Toshishita!! (1986, later featured in Ten de Shōwaru Cupid Volume 4)
- Jura no Miduki (1987, featured in Hop Step Award Selection Volume 1 and later in Ten de Shōwaru Cupid Volume 4)
- Ōkami Nante Kowakunai!! (1989, tankōbon published by Shueisha)
  - Buttobi Straight (1987)
  - Tonda Birthday Present (1987, published in Weekly Shōnen Jump)
  - Occult Tanteidan (1988–1989, two parts published in Weekly Shōnen Jump)
  - Horror Angel (1988, published in Weekly Shōnen Jump)
  - Ōkami Nante Kowakunai!! (1989, published in Weekly Shōnen Jump)
- Ten de Shōwaru Cupid (1989–1990, serialized in Weekly Shōnen Jump)
- YuYu Hakusho (1990–1994, serialized in Weekly Shōnen Jump)
- Level E (1995–1997, serialized in Weekly Shōnen Jump)
- Hunter × Hunter (1998–present), serialized in Weekly Shōnen Jump)
- Akuten Wars (2017, published in Grand Jump Premium, story only, illustrated by Hachi Mizuno)

=== Other ===
- Yoshirin de Pon! (1994, YuYu Hakusho dōjinshi distributed at 1994 summer Comic Market)
- Biohazard 3: The Last Escape Official Guidebook (1999, published by ASCII)
- Official Hunter × Hunter Guide (2004, published by Shueisha)
- YuYu Hakusho Who's Who Underworld Character Book (2005, published by Shueisha)
- YuYu Hakusho Illustrations (2005, published by Shueisha)
- Oobo— Nu— To Chiibo— Nu— (2005, published by Kodansha)
- Hetappi Manga Kenkyūjo R (2011, published by Shueisha)
