= YuYu Hakusho =

Japanese manga series by Yoshihiro Togashi

- First tankōbon volume cover, featuring Yusuke Urameshi (back) and Keiko Yukimura (front)

幽☆遊☆白書 (Yū Yū Hakusho)
- Genre: Adventure; Martial arts; Supernatural
- Manga
- Written by: Yoshihiro Togashi
- Published by: Shueisha
- English publisher: NA: Viz Media
- Imprint: Jump Comics
- Magazine: Weekly Shōnen Jump
- English magazine: NA: Shonen Jump
- Original run: December 3, 1990 – July 25, 1994
- Volumes: 19
- Television series
- 1992 anime television series; 2023 drama television series
- Films
- Yu Yu Hakusho: The Movie; Yu Yu Hakusho the Movie: Poltergeist Report
- icon

YuYu Hakusho (Japanese: 幽☆遊☆白書, Hepburn: Yū Yū Hakusho) is a Japanese manga series written and illustrated by Yoshihiro Togashi. It was serialized in Shueisha's shōnen manga magazine Weekly Shōnen Jump from December 1990 to July 1994, with its 175 chapters collected into 19 tankōbon volumes.

The series follows Yusuke Urameshi, a teenage delinquent who is struck and killed by a car while saving a child's life. After several tests presented to him by Koenma, the son of the ruler of the afterlife, Yusuke is revived and appointed the title of "Underworld Detective". With this title, he must investigate various cases involving demons and apparitions in the Human World, with the manga gradually becoming more focused on martial arts battles and tournaments as it progresses. Togashi began conceptualizing YuYu Hakusho around November 1990, basing the series on his interests in the occult and horror films, along with Buddhist mythology.

In North America, the manga is licensed by Viz Media, which first serialized it in Shonen Jump from January 2003 to January 2010. An anime adaptation consisting of 112 television episodes, directed by Noriyuki Abe and co-produced by Fuji Television, Yomiko Advertising, and Studio Pierrot, aired from October 1992 to January 1995. The YuYu Hakusho franchise has spawned two animated films, a series of original video animations (OVAs), a live-action television series, video games, and other merchandise.

YuYu Hakusho has been well received; the manga has over 50 million copies in circulation worldwide, making it one of the best-selling manga series of all time. It also won the 39th Shogakukan Manga Award for the shōnen category in 1993.

== Plot ==
YuYu Hakusho follows Yusuke Urameshi, a 14-year-old street-brawling delinquent who, in an uncharacteristic act of altruism, is hit by a car and killed in an attempt to save a young boy by pushing him out of the way. His ghost is greeted by Botan, a woman who introduces herself as the pilot of the Sanzu River, who ferries souls to the Underworld (霊界, Reikai; "Spirit World" in the English anime dub) where they may be judged for the afterlife. Botan informs Yusuke that his act had caught even the Underworld by surprise and that there was not yet a place made for him in either heaven or hell. Thus, Koenma, son of the Underworld's ruler King Enma, offers Yusuke a chance to return to his body through a series of tests. Yusuke succeeds with the help of his friends Keiko Yukimura and Kazuma Kuwabara.

After returning to life, Koenma grants Yusuke the title of "Underworld Detective" (霊界探偵, Reikai Tantei; lit. 'Spirit World Detective', 'Spirit Detective' in the English dub), charging him with investigating supernatural activity within the Human World (人間界, Ningen Kai). Soon Yusuke is off on his first case, retrieving three treasures stolen from the Underworld by a gang of demons: Hiei, Kurama, and Goki. Yusuke collects the three treasures with the aid of his new technique, the Rei Gun, a shot of aura or Reiki (霊気, Reiki; lit. 'Spirit Energy') fired mentally from his index finger. He then travels to the mountains in search of the aged, female martial arts master Genkai. Together with Kuwabara, Yusuke fights through a tournament organized by Genkai to find her successor. Yusuke uses the competition as a cover to search for Rando, a demon who steals the techniques of martial arts masters and kills them. Yusuke defeats Rando in the final round of the tournament and trains with Genkai for several months, gaining more mastery over his aura. Yusuke is then sent to Labyrinth Castle in the Demon Plane (魔界, Makai; lit. 'Demon World'), a third world occupied solely by demons, where Kuwabara and the newly reformed Kurama and Hiei assist him in defeating the Four Beasts, a quartet of demons attempting to blackmail Koenma into removing the barrier keeping them out of the Human World.

Yusuke's next case sends him on a rescue mission, where he meets Toguro, a human turned into a demon. To test his strength, Toguro invites Yusuke to the Dark Tournament (暗黒武術会, Ankoku Bujutsukai; lit. 'Dark Martial Arts Association'), an event put on by corrupt, rich humans in which teams of demons, and occasionally humans, fight fierce battles for the chance to receive any wish they desire. Team Urameshi, consisting of Yusuke, Kuwabara, Kurama, Hiei, and a disguised Genkai, traverses through the strenuous early rounds to face Team Toguro in the finals and win the tournament. They learn that Team Toguro's owner, Sakyo, was attempting to win to create a large hole from the Human World to the Demon Plane and allow countless demons through. With his loss, Sakyo destroys the tournament arena, killing himself in the process.

After the tournament, Yusuke returns home but has little time to rest as three teenagers possessing superhuman powers challenge him and take him hostage. Kuwabara and the others rescue Yusuke and learn that the scenario was a test from Genkai. It is disclosed that Shinobu Sensui, Yusuke's predecessor as Underworld Detective, has recruited six other powerful beings to help him take over where Sakyo left off, opening a hole to the Demon Plane to cause genocide of the human race. Yusuke and his friends challenge and defeat Sensui's associates, culminating in a final battle between the two detectives. Sensui kills Yusuke and then retreats into the newly opened portal to the Demon Plane. Yusuke is reborn as a partial demon, discovering that his ancestor passed down a recessive gene that would hide until an heir with sufficient power surfaced, when his demonic lineage would be revealed. Yusuke travels to the Demon Plane and defeats Sensui with the aid of his ancestor, who takes control of Yusuke's body to finish the fight.

As they return to the Human World, Yusuke is stripped of his detective title in fear that his demon blood could cause him to go on a rampage in the Human World. Yusuke, unsettled at having been controlled by his ancestor Raizen, accepts an offer by Raizen's followers to return to the Demon Plane. Raizen, desiring a successor to his territory, is on the brink of dying of starvation, a death that would topple the delicate political balance of the three ruling powers of the Demon Plane. The other two rulers Mukuro and Yomi summon Hiei and Kurama, respectively, to prepare for an inevitable war. The three protagonists train in the realm for one year, during which time Raizen dies, and Yusuke inherits his territory. Yusuke takes the initiative and proposes a fighting tournament to name the Demon Plane's true ruler; Mukuro and Yomi agree to Yusuke's terms. During the tournament, Yusuke and Yomi meet in the second elimination round, where Yusuke is defeated. Yusuke hopes a similar competition will be held every few years to determine the Demon Plane's ruler.

Two years later, Yusuke returns to the Human World while Hiei stays with Mukuro and protects humans who have accidentally wandered into the Demon Plane. After learning that King Enma was falsifying reports of demon activity against humans to justify keeping the two separated, Koenma takes over his father's position and allows access between the Demon Plane and the Human World. Genkai dies and leaves her estate to the main characters. The story ends with Yusuke and his friends reuniting at a beach.

== Production ==
Author Yoshihiro Togashi stated that he began working on YuYu Hakusho around November 1990, though he forgot the exact time. He had recently completed the serialization of his romantic comedy Ten de Shōwaru Cupid in Weekly Shōnen Jump. Having felt somewhat intimidated by some of his more popular fellow authors during this manga's run, Togashi realized he would need to create a fighting manga to both gain popularity and write something he enjoyed. As a fan of the occult and horror films, he desired to write and illustrate a new manga based on his interests. Togashi had previously published an occult detective fiction manga titled Occult Tanteidan, of which he referenced positive reception from readers as a reason for continuing to create manga. When first producing YuYu Hakusho, he did not have a clear idea of what he wanted to call it. He used the tentative title "How to be a Ghost" while presenting rough drafts to his editors. Once given the go-ahead to begin publication, Togashi proposed "YuYu-Ki" (Poltergeist Chronicles) for the title, as there would be battles with demons and it would be a play on the title SaiYu-Ki. However, a series with a similar name (Chin-Yu-Ki) had already begun publication, so Togashi quickly created an alternative: "YuYu Hakusho" (Poltergeist Report). He commented that he could have used "Den" (Legend) or "Monogatari" (Story), but "Hakusho" (Report) was the first thing that came to his mind. He consistently developed the names of the main characters by skimming through a dictionary and taking out kanji characters he found appealing. "Yusuke Urameshi" is a pun, "Kazuma Kuwabara" is a combination of two professional baseball players, and "Hiei" and "Kurama" are "just names that popped into [Togashi's] head." When he introduced the latter two characters in volume three, the author had early plans to make Kurama a main character, but was not certain about Hiei.

The manga's shift from occult detective fiction to the martial arts genre after Yusuke's death and revival in the early chapters was planned by Togashi from the beginning. He took this idea from the series Kinnikuman, which began largely as a comedy before concentrating more on action. Togashi intended to establish the main characters and familiarize the reader with them before placing them in tense, physical conflicts. His editor at the time was nervous about him beginning the manga this way and recommended he transition to a battle-focused plot after about 30 chapters. YuYu Hakusho borrows many elements from Asian folklore, particularly Buddhist beliefs in the afterlife. Togashi came up with the concept of the Ningenkai (Human World), Reikai (Underworld), and Makai (Demon Plane) as being parallel planes of existence in the manga's universe. He thought of them as places one could not easily travel between using modern technology, but rather as a spirit lacking a material body. However, the idea for the "territory" powers from the Sensui story arc was parodied from a separate, unnamed work by Yasutaka Tsutsui. For his drawing materials, Togashi used drafting ink and Kabura pens throughout the creation of the series. While his style of artwork began with screentone, he gradually developed into minimalism. As the series progressed, he would draw figures and faces very detailed or "cartoony, sketchy, and jumping with action" whenever he desired such effects.

During the years he worked on YuYu Hakusho, Togashi calculated the personal time he had based on a formula of four hours per page without scripting and five hours of sleep per night. He wrote in his own dōjinshi Yoshirin de Pon! that he stopped the production on YuYu Hakusho out of selfishness. The author had originally wanted to end the manga in December 1993, at the climax of the Sensui arc. Although there was not a great demand from the editorial staff, Togashi was under a great deal of personal stress at certain points of the series' run, particularly during its final six months of publication. He claimed that beginning with the Dark Tournament arc, inconsistent sleep due to overwork was causing him health problems. He noted he was very ill while working on the color pages for Yusuke's match with Chu. There were many instances where he would create nearly entire manuscripts by himself, such as Yusuke's meeting with Raizen and the battle between Kurama and Karasu. The publication's editors tried to make Togashi reconsider canceling Yu Yu Hakusho, though he justified his decision by stating that another popular series would replace it. Togashi was relieved at the conclusion of the manga. The author claimed he was not involved in the production of the YuYu Hakusho anime adaptation due to his work schedule. He stated that he was greatly impressed by Shigeru Chiba's voice depiction of Kuwabara, admitting that the actor understood the character better than Togashi himself.

== Media ==
=== Manga ===
The YuYu Hakusho manga series was written and illustrated by Yoshihiro Togashi and originally serialized by Shueisha in the shōnen manga magazine Weekly Shōnen Jump from December 3, 1990, to July 25, 1994. The manga consists of 175 chapters spanning 19 tankōbon with the first one being released on April 10, 1991, and the last one released on December 12, 1994. Between August 4, 2004, and March 4, 2005, Shueisha released the kanzenban (complete) editions of the manga. Each of the 15 kanzenban volumes features a new cover and more chapters than the tankōbon edition. YuYu Hakusho has also been published as part of the Shueisha Jump Remix series of magazine-style books. Nine volumes were released between December 22, 2008, and April 27, 2009. A bunkoban version began publication on November 18, 2010, and was finished on October 18, 2011.

An English translation of the YuYu Hakusho manga was serialized in North America by Viz Media in the American Shonen Jump magazine, where it debuted in its inaugural January 2003 issue and ended in January 2010. Viz released all 19 collected volumes of the English manga between May 1, 2003, and March 2, 2010. A total of 176 chapters exist in this format due to Viz treating the extra non-numbered chapter "YuYu Hakusho Tales: Two Shot" found in volume seven (which tells the story of how Hiei and Kurama first met) as the 64th chapter. Viz later re-released the series digitally as part of their digital manga releases between August 20, 2013, and February 25, 2014, and later added it to ComiXology's digital releases. The YuYu Hakusho manga has additionally been licensed and published across Asia and Europe. A French translation from Kana, for example, began publication in 1997.

=== Anime ===
The Yu Yu Hakusho anime adaptation was directed by Noriyuki Abe and co-produced by Fuji Television, Yomiko Advertising, and Studio Pierrot. The series, consisting of 112 episodes, aired from October 10, 1992, to January 7, 1995, on Fuji Television.

=== Films and original video animations ===
Two animated films based on Yu Yu Hakusho have been produced. Both films have original storyline content that is not canonical to the manga. The first, titled Yu Yu Hakusho was released in Japan on July 10, 1993, as part of a seasonal film festival. In the movie, Yusuke and Kuwabara are on a mission to rescue a kidnapped Koenma from a pair of demons who desire the Golden Seal, a stamp used for finalizing the sentencing of souls in the afterlife.

Yu Yu Hakusho the Movie: Poltergeist Report, known in Japan as Yu Yu Hakusho: Chapter of Underworld's Carnage – Bonds of Fire (幽☆遊☆白書 冥界死闘篇 炎の絆, Yū Yū Hakusho: Meikai Shitō Hen – Honō no Kizuna), was released in Japanese theaters on April 9, 1994. The plot revolves around Yusuke and his friends defending the Human World against inhabitants of a fourth plane of existence called the "Netherworld".

A series of Yu Yu Hakusho OVAs collectively titled Eizou Hakusho (映像白書, Eizō Hakusho; lit. 'Image Report') was released in Japan in VHS format between 1994 and 1996. The OVAs feature very short clips that take place after the end of the series. They also contain video montages from the anime, image songs, voice actor interviews, and satirical animated shorts focusing on the four protagonists.

A brand new OVA of Yu Yu Hakusho was released with a Blu-ray box set of the series on October 26, 2018, in Japan. It adapts the "Two Shot" bonus chapter from the manga's seventh volume and the manga's penultimate chapter "All or Nothing".

=== Video games ===
Several video games have been developed that tie to the YuYu Hakusho series, most of which have been produced for and released exclusively in Japan. Before the launch of the franchise in North America, games were released on the Game Boy, Super Famicom, Sega consoles, and various platforms. North America only saw three video game releases. Two releases for Nintendo's Game Boy Advance handheld console, and one release for Sony's PlayStation 2 console. A single Mega Drive game, Yū Yū Hakusho Makyō Tōitsusen, was published in Brazil by Tectoy in 1999 under the title YuYu Hakusho: Sunset Fighters. When Atari gained publishing rights to Yu Yu Hakusho video games in 2003, the company created and released three games in these regions: Yu Yu Hakusho: Spirit Detective, an action-adventure game for the Game Boy Advance; Yu Yu Hakusho: Tournament Tactics, a tactical role-playing game also for the Game Boy Advance; and Yu Yu Hakusho: Dark Tournament, a 3D fighting game for the PlayStation 2.

Yu Yu Hakusho characters were also featured in the Weekly Shōnen Jump crossover fighting games J-Stars Victory VS and Jump Force. Yusuke, Hiei, and Toguro are playable in both games.

=== Live-action series ===
On December 16, 2020, a Japanese live-action series adaptation was announced. It is streaming on Netflix worldwide, with Netflix contents acquisition director Kazutaka Sakamoto serving as executive producer and Akira Morii producing the series at Robot. On July 15, 2022, it was reported that Shō Tsukikawa will serve as the series director, with Tatsurō Mishima handling the script and Ryō Sakaguchi serving as the VFX supervisor. The series stars Takumi Kitamura as Yusuke Urameshi, Shuhei Uesugi as Kazuma Kuwabara, Jun Shison as Kurama, and Kanata Hongō as Hiei. It premiered on December 14, 2023.

=== Other media ===
An encyclopedia titled Official YuYu Hakusho Who's Who Underworld Character Book (幽★遊★白書 公式キャラクターズブック 霊界紳士録, Yū Yū Hakusho Kōshiki Kyarakutāzu Bukku Reikai Shinshiroku) was published by Shueisha on March 4, 2005. It contains extensive character profiles, story summaries, and an exclusive interview with Yoshihiro Togashi. An art book, YuYu Hakusho Illustrations (幽☆遊☆白書 画集, Yū Yū Hakusho Gashū), was published by Shueisha on April 27, 2005. It is composed of pieces of artwork from the series, including illustrations created for the kanzenban edition reprints and an index of print material where each image was first used. Shueisha has also released a two-volume guidebook to the anime series titled YuYu Hakusho Perfect File (幽☆遊☆白書 パーフェクトファイル, Yū Yū Hakusho Pāfekuto Fairu) and books based on both films, each containing screenshots organized in manga-style panels. In Japan, various collectibles such as trading figures, plush dolls, and gashapon toys also exist. A collectible card game based on the franchise was released by Movic. In North America, the series saw licensing for apparel from ODM, lines of action figures by IF Labs and Jakks Pacific, a Skannerz electronic toy from Radica Games, and an activities book from Scholastic. Score Entertainment created the Yu Yu Hakusho Trading Card Game for release in the United States. An English guidebook to the game titled Yu Yu Hakusho Uncovered: The Unofficial Guide was published by Cocoro Books on October 12, 2004.

A stage play adaptation produced by Office Endless was announced in May 2019. Written and directed by Chūji Mikasano, a screenwriter for the Tokyo Ghoul anime series, the play ran from August 8 to September 22, 2019, in Tokyo, Osaka, Fukuoka, and Aichi.

In September 2019, YuYu Hakusho joined the Universal Fighting System collectible card game. This marked the second anime license to make it into the system.

== Reception ==
By 2013, YuYu Hakusho had over 50 million copies in circulation in Japan alone, making it one of Weekly Shonen Jump's best-selling manga series. Patricia Duffield, a columnist for Animerica Extra, acknowledged the manga as "one of the kings of popularity in the mid-1990s" in the region where it saw mass availability from large bookstore chains to small train station kiosks. YuYu Hakusho earned Yoshihiro Togashi the Shogakukan Manga Award for shōnen in 1993. Towards the end of the series' run, Togashi was publicly criticized for not meeting chapter deadlines and for lower quality art. On TV Asahi's Manga Sōsenkyo 2021 poll, in which 150,000 people voted for their top 100 manga series, YuYu Hakusho ranked seventeenth.

In North America, several volumes of the manga have ranked within the weekly Nielsen BookScan graphic novels list, including volume five at both sixth and ninth in October 2004, volume six at sixth in February 2005, and volume seven at seventh in June 2005. In 2004, the YuYu Hakusho manga serialization sparked a controversy when a Florida grade school teacher issued a complaint about material found in an issue of the American Shonen Jump magazine purchased by a fifth-grade student at a Scholastic Book Fair. The complaint centered around portions of the manga containing violence, mild profanity, a character wearing a swastika, and another character smoking a cigarette. About 18,000 copies of the publication (out of 120,000) were returned from the fairs as a result of the matter. A Viz spokesperson defended the manga, clarifying that it is intended for older teens and that the alleged swastika is actually a Buddhist manji.

The YuYu Hakusho manga publication has received mixed criticism from reviewers in English-speaking regions. Martin Ouellette of the Canadian Protoculture Addicts compared the progression of the series to Dragon Ball Z and stated, "Togashi's art, while simple, is extremely efficient and the story is really fun." An older article by the same reviewer disagreed with the notion that YuYu Hakusho was similar to Dragon Ball, stating that the former franchise has better-developed characters, more interesting action sequences, and more humor. Eduardo M. Chavez of Mania.com enjoyed the manga's artwork and found that the supporting characters tend to be illustrated with more detail than the main characters. He praised Lillian Olsen's English translation but disliked Viz's use of overlaying English words to translate the expression of sound effects. In later volumes, Chavez was dismayed by the manga's transition from the early detective cases to the Dark Tournament arc. He asserted, "Seeing fight, after fight, after fight gets boring, and this seriously is only the start of this trend." Dan Polley, a staff reviewer of Manga Life, gave an average grade to the fifth volume, which entails Yusuke's battle with Suzaku, the leader of the Four Beasts. Although he found some battle sequences engaging, Polley judged the chapters as lacking in characterization and development. Polley also discounted the manga's comedy, considering the "bit gags or fairly lame jokes" to be "too much" at times.
