= Yu Yu Hakusho: Spirit Detective =

2003 video game

- North American version cover art
- Developers: Sensory Sweep Studios; Screaming Games
- Publisher: Atari
- Platform: Game Boy Advance
- Release: NA: December 2, 2003; EU: April 1, 2005
- Genre: Action-adventure
- Mode: Single-player

Yu Yu Hakusho: Spirit Detective is a video game for the Game Boy Advance (GBA) handheld console. Based on the manga and anime series YuYu Hakusho created by Yoshihiro Togashi, the plot follows the central character Yusuke Urameshi, a street-brawling, often truant teenager who dies trying to save a young boy's life. After meeting an incarnation of the Grim Reaper, Yusuke is given a second chance at life as a "Spirit Detective", a protector of the living world.

Spirit Detective is an action-adventure game that retells the various events of the anime's story arc of the same name. The player takes control of one of six characters from the series and must complete various objectives from collecting items and completing mazes to battling enemies and occasional bosses. Spirit Detective was co-developed by Sensory Sweep Studios and Screaming Games as part of a western region publishing deal from Atari. Spirit Detective is the first Yu Yu Hakusho game that never saw a release in Japan.

Critical reception for Spirit Detective has been mostly unfavorable. While separate reviewers had their own qualms about the game, nearly all complained of monotonous gameplay and boring visuals.

== Plot and gameplay ==
The player (left) battles several enemies. The experience, health, and spirit gauges are located at the bottom of the screen.

Yu Yu Hakusho: Spirit Detective is based on the manga and anime series YuYu Hakusho by author Yoshihiro Togashi. The plot follows Yusuke Urameshi, a 14-year-old with a bad attitude and a tendency for truancy and street fighting. One day, Yusuke spots a child playing with a ball in the street, the protagonist pushes the child out of the way of a speeding car, only to be struck and killed himself. Yusuke's ghost is suddenly greeted by Botan, a cute girl who introduces herself as the Grim Reaper. She informs Yusuke that, due to his noble actions, he will be given a second chance at life as a "Spirit Detective", an investigator of cases involving apparitions and demons on Earth. Spirit Detective retells events from the anime's initial story arc of the same name, consisting of the show's first 25 episodes.

Spirit Detective is an action-adventure game in which the player must complete various storyline scenarios using one of six characters at any given time. The player is able to move freely within the game's maze-like environments and is guided to specific objectives using a compass, located at the top of the screen. Objectives include picking up items or engaging in battle with foes. Combat consists of hand-to-hand or melee attacks, as well as special spirit abilities unique to four of the protagonists (Yusuke, Kuwabara, Kurama, and Hiei). The player's health, spirit energy, and experience are represented by gauges. Items that refill health and spirit energy may be found strewn throughout many of the levels. Defeating enemies will reveal orbs that can be collected for experience. If enough of them are picked up, the character's health, spirit energy, and strength will increase. Although most levels require the use of one particular character, later levels allow the player to switch among the four aforementioned heroes.

== Development ==
Yu Yu Hakusho: Spirit Detective was developed by the US company Sensory Sweep Studios in association with Screaming Games. Before its development, a multitude of licensed video games based on Yu Yu Hakusho were released in Japan during the anime television series' original airing. The anime began its broadcast in North America in 2002, gaining popularity on the afternoon Cartoon Network block Toonami. In June 2003, the gaming company Atari and Funimation Entertainment, the English licensor for the YuYu Hakusho anime, established a publishing agreement for video games in western regions. Spirit Detective for the GBA is the first Yu Yu Hakusho game title in this deal. The two companies had found previous success with another Funimation license, Dragon Ball Z.

Spirit Detective is Sensory Sweep's first published game. According to the company's Devon Hargraves, a team of 15 individuals took about five months to develop Spirit Detective. Although were not given a lot of time to adjust their engine, the team attempted to include all aspects of the Spirit Detective saga. Hargraves acted as a "jack-of-a-trades" designer for the game, working on the design documentation, giving game ideas and feedback, designing levels, and writing part of the script. Screaming Games had a more indirect involvement with the game's development by helping Sensory Sweep and Atari "line up" and "flesh out the project and all of the documentation". Spirit Detective was officially announced by Atari in August 2003. The game was released in North America on December 9, 2003, and in Europe on April 1, 2005. Spirit Detective was later released in a double-pack with Dragon Ball Z: Taiketsu in North America on November 3, 2006.

== Reception ==
Reception

Aggregate score
Aggregator	Score
Metacritic	33 out of 100

Review scores
Publication	Score
Electronic Gaming Monthly	2.17 out of 10
GameZone	5 out of 10
IGN	3 out of 10
Nintendo Power	2.3 out of 5
Nintendo World Report	3 out of 10

The game received "unfavorable" reviews according to the review aggregation website Metacritic. One universal complaint about the game was the very repetitive and thus unenjoyable nature of the gameplay. Adam Tierney of IGN lambasted the combat with enemy AI, the required use of the compass in the maze-like levels, and the discouragement of exploration. Eduardo Zacarias of GameZone found that the battles become "more of a nuisance rather than an entertaining challenge"; he did credit the developer's attempt at variety with the unique objectives in each stage. Nintendo World Report writer Michael Cole chose Spirit Detective among the worst games he has played, noting poor collision detection, significant lag when using special attacks, and virtually no challenge in its battles or collection missions. Cole was satisfied with the integration of episode plot devices into the levels and the inclusion of minigames.

Most critics disapproved of the graphics in Spirit Detective, while opinions about other aspects of the presentation have been largely mixed. Tierney called the backgrounds "dull" and "bland", the looping music "weak", and static menus "bland", but did take pleasure in the pre-rendered models and the clever text used in the storyline adaptation. Contrarily, Cole thought the plot "flows like a low-budget clip show", requiring the player to be familiar with the anime and allegedly neither introducing characters and situations in a proper fashion nor including all portions of the story arc. Like Tierney, Zacarias was unmoved by the graphics and accompanying music, but was impressed by the fighting animation and sound effects. Cole described the use of official in-game artwork as a plus, but remarked the audio as "horrible".

Despite the game's poor critical reception, Atari's North American division reported satisfying financial results for its third quarter of 2003, naming Spirit Detective as one of the contributing titles. Sensory Sweep Studios and Screaming Games collaborated once more for the release of Yu Yu Hakusho: Tournament Tactics for the GBA in 2004.
