= Yu Yu Hakusho season 1 =

Season of television series

Yu Yu Hakusho
- Season 1
- No. of episodes: 25

Release
- Original network: Fuji Television
- Original release: October 10, 1992 – April 10, 1993

Season chronology
- Next → Season 2

The first season of the Yu Yu Hakusho anime series, the Spirit Detective Saga, was directed by Noriyuki Abe and produced by Fuji Television, Yomiko Advertising and Studio Pierrot. The episodes were released in North America by Funimation. The season adapts Yoshihiro Togashi's Yu Yu Hakusho manga from the first through sixth volumes over twenty-five episodes. The episodes follow the story of Yusuke Urameshi, a teenage boy who dies in an accident, and is resurrected as a Spirit Detective, Spirit World's protector of the Living World against demons and other supernatural threats.

The season ran from October 10, 1992, to April 10, 1993, on Fuji Television in Japan. The English episodes aired from February 2002 to April 2003. The first twenty-one episodes were shown on Cartoon Network's Adult Swim programming block, with reruns playing after the broadcast night of July 6, 2002. New episodes began airing in April 2003, when the episodes began showing on Cartoon Network's Toonami programming block.

Two pieces of theme music are used for the episodes; one opening theme and one closing theme. The opening theme is "Hohoemi no Bakudan" (微笑みの爆弾; lit. 'Smile Bomb') by Matsuko Mawatari. Another of Mawatari's works, "Homework ga Owaranai" (ホームワークが終わらない, Hōmuwāku ga Owaranai; lit. 'The Homework Never Ends') is the closing theme.

Seven DVD compilations, containing either three or four episodes, have been released by Funimation. The first was released on April 16, 2002, with the seventh released on December 10, 2002. In addition, a full collection, containing all seven DVD compilations of the saga, was released on January 14, 2003. A Blu-ray compilation was released by Funimation on May 31, 2011.

== Episodes ==
No.	Title	Directed by	Written by	Storyboard by	Original release date	English release date
1	"Surprised to be Dead"; Transliteration: "Shindara Odoroita!" (Japanese: 死んだらオドロいた)	Noriyuki Abe	Yoshiyuki Ōhashi	Noriyuki Abe	October 10, 1992	February 23, 2002
A 14-year-old narcissistic, street-fighting slacker Yusuke Urameshi dies an unlikely hero, after he is hit by a car after saving a young child who was playing with a ball in the street. He soon learns that the child would have lived anyway, and that the Spirit World was not expecting him to die. For this reason, he is then offered the chance to be revived by the mysterious Botan, Guardian of the river Styx. At first, Yusuke initially refuses the proposal, but ultimately accepts after seeing the people he thought did not care for him, including his childhood friend Keiko Yukimura, his mother Atsuko, and his rival Kazuma Kuwabara grieving for him at his wake.
2	"Koenma Appears" (Koenma of the Spirit Realm! A Trial Towards Resurrection); Transliteration: "Reikai no Koenma! Fukkatsu e no Shiren" (Japanese: 霊界のコエンマ! 復活への試練)	Shigeru Ueda	Yoshiyuki Ōhashi	Akihiro Enomoto	October 17, 1992	March 2, 2002
Yusuke meets Koenma, son of the ruler of the Spirit World, and is given the task of raising a spirit egg that, when hatched, may return him to his body. Yusuke appears to Keiko in a dream to tell her that he will soon be revived. He later possesses the body of Kuwabara for one hour to find Keiko to inform Atsuko not to have his body cremated since he will attempt to come back to life.
3	"Kuwabara: A Promise Between Men" (Kuwabara in a Corner! A Man's Oath); Transliteration: "Oitsumerareta Kuwabara! Otoko no Chikai" (Japanese: 追いつめられた桑原! 男の誓い)	Kazunori Mizuno	Yoshiyuki Ōhashi	Kazunori Mizuno	October 24, 1992	March 9, 2002
Yusuke discovers that Kuwabara has been forced by a cruel and corrupt teacher into a policy of strict nonviolence for a week, having the risk of one of his own friends losing his after-school job and being unable to support his family. The teacher, witnessing Kuwabara's determination to keep his promise (going so far as not to offer resistance whenever he is harassed by punks), then puts an additional stipulation that Kuwabara must score 50% or higher on the upcoming physical science exam. Yusuke later helps him study by communicating to him in his dreams. Kuwabara becomes furious after the teacher attempts to alter his passing grade, yet Yusuke is able to prevent his violence. The teacher is forced to change the paper back under the orders of the tough-but-fair Principal Takenaka, and Kuwabara's friend keeps his job, with Kuwabara thanking Yusuke.
4	"Requirements for Lovers" (Hot Flames! Ties of the Beloved); Transliteration: "Atsuki Honō! Koibito no Kizuna" (Japanese: 熱き炎! 恋人のきずな)	Akiyuki Shinbo	Sukehiro Tomita	Motosuke Takahashi	October 31, 1992	March 16, 2002
Keiko goes to Yusuke's house to watch over him. Multiple house fires were reported around the area. It is soon realized that Yusuke's house becomes kindled after Keiko leaves. She returns to try to retrieve him from the flames. Yusuke has to decide between saving the girl he loves most and having any chance of returning to life. Yusuke chooses to throw his spirit egg into the fire to save Keiko, and in so doing, earns the right to return to life.
5	"Yusuke's Back" (Yusuke's Resurrection! A New Trial); Transliteration: "Yūsuke Fukkatsu! Aratanaru Shimei" (Japanese: 幽助復活! 新たなる使命)	Junya Koshiba	Katsuyuki Sumisawa	Junya Koshiba	November 7, 1992	March 23, 2002
Yusuke is told by Koenma that, in order to complete his resurrection, he must get someone who cares about him to kiss his body within one day, this being the conduit of his soul back into his body. As he was unable to convince Kuwabara and Atsuko, he manages to get Keiko to do so just in time. Yusuke witnesses Kuwabara falling victim to a gang leader who has kept his pet cat hostage. He catches sight of a demon after defeating the gang leader, as it turns out that Koenma and Botan have other plans for Yusuke now that he is alive again.
6	"Three Monsters" (The Three Yokai! Hiei, Kurama, and Gouki); Transliteration: "Sanbiki no Yōkai! Hiei Kurama Gōki" (Japanese: 三匹の妖怪! 飛影·蔵馬·剛鬼)	Hitoyuki Matsui	Hiroshi Hashimoto	Hitoyuki Matsui	November 14, 1992	March 30, 2002
Koenma reveals to Yusuke that he is a spirit detective, and must use his own unique abilities to battle demons and other threats to the Living World. Koenma additionally gives Yusuke a mission to recover three artifacts stolen by master thieves of the Spirit World. Yusuke first encounters Gouki, the first thief who possesses the Orb of Baast: an artifact that enables the user to steal human souls, especially those of children. Gouki proves to be much stronger than Yusuke, threatening to eat him alive.
7	"Gouki and Kurama" (Kurama's Secret!? The Ties Between Mother and Son); Transliteration: "Kurama no Himitsu?! Haha To Ko no Kizuna" (Japanese: 蔵馬の秘密?! 母と子のきずな)	Akiyuki Shinbo	Yoshiyuki Ōhashi	Akiyuki Shinbo	November 21, 1992	April 6, 2002
Gouki retreats after hearing Botan's voice, and Yusuke is brought safely back to his home. Yusuke later fights and defeats Gouki in a forest, recovering his artifact. He then meets with Kurama, the second thief who possesses the Forlorn Hope: an artifact that enables its user to have any wish they want, but at the cost of their own life. Kurama plans to use this artifact to sacrifice himself to save his human mother Shiori, who's currently suffering from a terrible illness. Yusuke, believing that Kurama's sacrifice would cause his mother pain, gives some of his life force towards the mirror so that Kurama will not have to die, and claims the mirror in the end while Kurama is relieved to know that his mother will be okay.
8	"The Three Eyes of Hiei" (Keiko in Peril! Hiei, the Jagan Master); Transliteration: "Keiko Ayaushi! Jaganshi Hiei" (Japanese: 螢子あやうし! 邪眼師·飛影)	Junya Koshiba	Sukehiro Tomita	Takeshi Mori	November 28, 1992	April 13, 2002
The last thief, Hiei, who possesses the Shadow Sword: an artifact that has the power to turn any human it strikes into the lowest level of the demon class, has taken Keiko hostage in order to get both the Orb of Baast and the Forlorn Hope from Yusuke. Making matters worse, Yusuke and Botan are shocked to learn that Hiei had struck Keiko with the Shadow Sword and that she's slowly turning into a demon, which causes Botan to use her own spiritual power to prevent this from happening. Yusuke realizes that he must quickly defeat Hiei so that he can get the antidote needed to stop the transformation, which is currently sealed from within the hilt of the Shadow Sword. Hiei use the Jagan eye, affording him additional perception, which, in turn, presents Yusuke a battle much too difficult. Kurama steps in to assist Yusuke and to help Botan prevent Keiko from becoming a demon. Yusuke manages to trick Hiei by firing his spirit gun off the Forlorn Hope in order to hit Hiei in his blind spot, defeating him. The artifacts are taken back to the Spirit World, and Keiko reverts to normal thanks to the antidote.
9	"The Search Begins" (The Successor to Genkai! The Tournament Begins); Transliteration: "Genkai no Keishōsha Tournament Kaishi" (Japanese: 幻海の継承者トーナメント開始)	Junya Koshiba	Katsuyuki Sumisawa	Takeshi Mori	December 5, 1992	April 20, 2002
Yusuke enters a fighting tournament at Koenma's behest. The winner of the tournament gets to learn the secret techniques of Genkai, a master psychic, and Koenma knows that there is a demon named Rando after Genkai's techniques. To his surprise, Yusuke finds his old rival Kuwabara at the tournament, seeking to learn more about his powers. Yusuke and Kuwabara inadvertently qualify for Genkai's tournament due to their high amount of spirit energy. After a series of arcade games testing the awareness, strength, and growth of spirit energy, only twenty finalists are left. As the next challenge is to travel through a forest onto the other side, Yusuke comes across and triumphs over a vampire bat-like demon named Baldok the Bat Tamer.
10	"Kuwabara's Spirit Sword" (Death Battle in the Dark! Kuwabara's Reiki Sword); Transliteration: "Kurayami no Shitō! Kuwabara Reiki no Ken" (Japanese: 暗闇の死闘! 桑原·霊気の剣)	Kazunori Mizuno	Hiroshi Hashimoto	Kazunori Mizuno	December 12, 1992	April 27, 2002
The eight remaining finalists are entered into a tournament of one-on-one matches. The first round takes place in a temple of complete darkness. The first match is between a ninja bodyguard named Kazamaru and a licensed hitman, Keroda, in which Kazamaru is victorious. The second match is between a wanderer named Chinpo, and a young psychic named Shorin, in which Shorin wins. In the third match, Kuwabara faces off against Musashi who can cloak his spirit energy. He soon discovers that he has a special technique of his own, that of spirit energy in the form of a sword. Using this technique, Kuwabara defeats Musashi, moving onto the next round of the tournament. Yusuke is to fight Kibano who wears a helmet that detects and absorbs spirit energy.
11	"Hard Fights for Yusuke" (Yusuke's Hard Battle! A Bruised and Bloody Counterattack); Transliteration: "Yūsuke Kurusen! Kizudarake Hangeki" (Japanese: 幽助苦戦! 傷だらけの反撃!!)	Hitoyuki Matsui	Yoshiyuki Ōhashi	Hitoyuki Matsui	December 19, 1992	May 4, 2002
Although Kibano has the upper hand for most of the fight, Yusuke defeats him by placing Genkai's lit cigarette on him, allowing him to see him and shoot him in the darkness. The semifinal round then takes place on a hill, and a weakened Yusuke has to face Kazamaru who uses shuriken as his preferred weapon, having the ability to home in on their targets. Yusuke ultimately manages to overcome him, by accident, proceeding onto the final round of the tournament.
12	"Rando Rises, Kuwabara Falls" (Rando Appears! Kuwabara's Grievous Defeat); Transliteration: "Randō Arawaru! Kuwabara Munen no Haiboku" (Japanese: 乱童あらわる! 桑原無念の敗北)	Akiyuki Shinbo	Sukehiro Tomita	Motosuke Takahashi	December 26, 1992	May 11, 2002
Kuwabara initially has the upper hand against Shorin, who reveals more that his initial demeanor entails. Using techniques of spirit mediums and masters of centuries past, Shorin is identified to be Rando by Genkai. Rando shrinks Kuwabara in size, proving to be much too powerful for him, as Rando literally almost crushes Kuwabara to death before returning him to normal size. The final battle between Yusuke and Rando ensues. Yusuke is able to break through one of Rando's destructive attacks, seemingly defeating him. However, Yusuke learns that Rando is far from defeated and that the real battle will soon begin.
13	"Yusuke vs. Rando: 99 Attacks" (Yusuke vs. Rando, Sorcery Thrown Into Chaos!!); Transliteration: "Yūsuke vs. Randō Midariretobu Yōjitsu" (Japanese: 幽助VS乱童 乱れとぶ妖術!!)	Junya Koshiba	Katsuyuki Sumisawa	Junya Koshiba	January 9, 1993	May 18, 2002
Rando reveals his true demonic form to Yusuke, using a barrage of stolen techniques against him. As Yusuke struggles with one of Rando's dangerous attacks, Kuwabara's soul travels to motivate him to keep fighting. Yusuke manages to overcome Rando by tricking him, turning his shrinking technique against him and crushing him with a hard elbow drop, defeating him for good and thereby becoming the student of Genkai for a month (six months in the English dub version). Genkai is also able to heal Kuwabara's harsh wounds.
14	"The Beasts of Maze Castle" (The Four Holy Beasts in the Labyrinthine Castle! A Challenge to the Spiritual Realm); Transliteration: "Meikyū Shiro no Shiseijū! Reikai e no Chōsen" (Japanese: 迷宮城の四聖獣! 霊界への挑戦)	Shigeru Ueda	Hiroshi Hashimoto	Akihiro Enomoto	January 16, 1993	May 25, 2002
Yusuke returns from training with Genkai to discover that his home city has been invaded by Makai insects inhabiting humans controlled by the Makai Whistle used by the four Saint Beasts. Yusuke and Kuwabara enter a hidden portal which takes them to the location of the Saint Beasts' castle. Kurama and Hiei, with the offer of pardons from their past crimes, have been sent to help Yusuke and Kuwabara with this new mission. Once inside, the four are faced with holding up a collapsed ceiling, trying not to betray one another in order to escape.
15	"Genbu, the Stone Beast" (The Beautiful Dance of the Rose! The Elegant Kurama); Transliteration: "Utsukushiki Bara no Mai! Karei Naru Kurama" (Japanese: 美しきバラの舞! 華麗なる蔵馬)	Kazunori Mizuno	Yoshiyuki Ōhashi	Noriyuki Abe	January 23, 1993	June 8, 2002
Hiei finds the switch to raise the ceiling, freeing the others from being flattened. Kurama faces off against Genbu, the first of the four Saint Beasts and a master of stone-based abilities. Using his plant abilities and intuition, Kurama splits Genbu apart. However, Genbu is able to reassemble and disassemble as one of his attacks. Kurama is able to defeat him by identifying his weakness in assembling, but is injured in the process.
16	"Byakko, the White Tiger" (Grow, Rei-ken! Kuwabara — A Man's Fight); Transliteration: "Tobi Yo Reiken! Kuwabara Otoko no Shōbu" (Japanese: 伸びよ霊剣! 桑原·男の勝負)	Akiyuki Shinbo	Sukehiro Tomita	Akiyuki Shinbo	January 30, 1993	June 15, 2002
Botan figures out that the Makai insects can inhabit depressed adults and children. Kuwabara demands to fight the next opponent himself, and encounters Byakko, the second Saint Beast. Byakko summons beasts from within his mane to attack Kuwabara. Nonetheless, Kuwabara uses his spirit sword to stab through each and every beast. With Byakko's ability to absorb spirit energy, Kuwabara's attacks prove fruitless. Determined to win, Kuwabara devises a plan to defeat Byakko.
17	"Byakko's Lair" (Byakko's Hellish Roar); Transliteration: "Byakko Jigoku no Otakebi" (Japanese: 白虎·地獄の雄叫び)	Junya Koshiba	Katsuyuki Sumisawa	Takeshi Mori	February 6, 1993	June 22, 2002
Byakko is seemingly defeated after absorbing too much spirit energy, yet Byakko appears once more to fight Kuwabara in a room full of molten lava. Kuwabara is faced with the obstacles of being eaten by Byakko and being burned by the lava. Using a new technique, Byakko turns the tables on Kuwabara, who desperately claims victory by sending Byakko into the lava.
18	"Seiryu, the Blue Dragon" (Hiei Comes Forward to Battle! A Slashing Sword); Transliteration: "Hiei Shusen! Kirisaku Ken" (Japanese: 飛影出戦! 切り裂く剣)	Hitoyuki Matsui	Hiroshi Hashimoto	Hitoyuki Matsui	February 13, 1993	June 29, 2002
As the four travel deeper within the castle, Seiryu, the third Saint Beast, appears. When Byakko weakly arrives and asks for Seiryu's help in fighting against the quartet, Seiryu freezes and shatters him to death after declaring him a failure and a disgrace to the Four Saint Beasts. Hiei chooses to battle Seiryu afterward. Although Seiryu seems to have the advantage, Hiei reveals that he has been merely toying with him, and easily reverses all of his ice attacks. As Seriyu attempts to respond, Hiei cuts him down with his sword. Meanwhile, the leader of the Saint Beasts learns about Yusuke's relationship with Keiko and decides to target her with the Makai-infested civilians in an attempt to weaken Yusuke's determination to stop him from carrying out his plan.
19	"Suzaku, Leader of the Beasts" (The Last of the Four Holy Beasts, Suzaku!); Transliteration: "Saigo no Shiseijū Suzaku" (Japanese: 最後の四聖獣·朱雀!)	Shigeru Ueda	Yoshiyuki Ōhashi	Akihiro Enomoto	February 20, 1993	June 6, 2002
Botan contacts Yusuke and informs him that the Makai-infested civilians are searching for Keiko in an attempt to kill her. As Yusuke, Kuwabara, Kurama, and Hiei run towards the watchtower in a desperate manner to defeat the last Saint Beast and destroy the Makai Whistle, an army of cultivated humans barricade their entrance. Yusuke jumps into the watchtower to face off against Suzaku, the last of the Saint Beasts, who controls the Makai insects with the Makai Whistle. Despite his determination to win, Yusuke has difficulty in dealing with Suzaku's lightning abilities.
20	"Seven Ways to Die" (Secret Techniques Clash! The Seven Suzaku); Transliteration: "Okugi Gekitotsu! Shichi Nin no Suzaku" (Japanese: 奥義激突! 七人の朱雀)	Kazunori Mizuno	Sukehiro Tomita	Kazunori Mizuno	February 27, 1993	July 6, 2002
Yusuke tried to snatch the Makai Whistle from Suzaku, but to no avail. Suzaku then reveals his secret technique, which is the ability to split himself into seven entities. Yusuke becomes overwhelmed by the massive attacks Suzaku unleashes. Meanwhile, Botan and Keiko must avoid harm from the Makai-infested civilians. Also, Kuwabara, Kurama, and Hiei are still occupied with the cultivated humans, even when entering the watchtower. Yusuke is reminded of his training under critical condition from Genkai, committing himself to fight even approaching death.
21	"Yusuke's Sacrifice" (Yusuke's Life or Death Counterattack); Transliteration: "Yūsuke Inochi o Kaketa Hangeki" (Japanese: 幽助·命を賭けた反撃)	Akiyuki Shinbo	Katsuyuki Sumisawa	Motosuke Takahashi	March 6, 1993	July 6, 2002
Yusuke uses up almost all of his spirit energy, seemingly murdering Suzaku's entities, to which Suzaku restores the spirit energies of the six. Kuwabara, Kurama, and Hiei make it to the top of the watchtower. Yusuke, confronted with an image of Keiko with her life threatened by the Makai-infested civilians, finally defeats Suzaku by using the last of his life energy to destroy all of his clones as well as to shatter the Makai Whistle from within the process of his action, reverting the Makai-infested civilians back to normal while saving Keiko and Botan at the same time. Kuwabara, despite his own injures from his battle with Byakko, transfers some of his spirit energy to the barely surviving Yusuke before the four return to the Living World.
22	"Lamenting Beauty" (A Sorrowful Young Beauty — Yukina); Transliteration: "Kanashimi no Bishōjo Yukina" (Japanese: 悲しみの美少女·雪菜)	Haruo Nakayama	Hiroshi Hashimoto	Takeshi Mori	March 13, 1993	April 3, 2003
Hiei gives Yusuke a cassette, sent from Koenma, that will describe his next case. Yusuke, Kuwabara, and Botan are recruited to rescue the ice maiden, Yukina, from the greedy and cruel human crime lord, Gonzo Tarukane, deep within the mountains. Tarukane forces Yukina to cry in order to secrete jewels from the tears of her eyes, which are considered to be highly rare and valuable. It is revealed that Yukina is actually Hiei's sister, in which Hiei plans to kill Tarukane if he arrives before the others.
23	"The Toguro Brothers Gang" (Envoys of Darkness! The Toguro Brothers); Transliteration: "Yami no Shisha! Toguro Kyōdai" (Japanese: 闇の使者! 戸愚呂兄弟)	Noriyuki Abe	Yoshiyuki Ōhashi	Noriyuki Abe	March 20, 1993	April 4, 2003
Yusuke and his friends must fight their way through the human and demon guards surrounding Tarukane's stronghold. Meanwhile, Tarukane bets on his human and demon guards killing the protagonist group with his fellow members of the Black Black Club, a human group of cruel and ruthless crime lords. However, Tarukane loses money every round to fellow Black Black Club member Sakyo, who bets on the side of the protagonists.
24	"The Deadly Triad" (Terrifyingly Mighty Foes! The Sankishu); Transliteration: "Osoroshiki Kyōteki! San Kishū" (Japanese: 恐ろしき強敵! 三鬼衆)	Akiyuki Shinbo	Sukehiro Tomita	Akiyuki Shinbo	March 27, 1993	April 5, 2003
Yusuke, Kuwabara, and Botan must face off against three specific demons known throughout the Spirit World as the Triad. All three members of the Triad are overwhelmed by the protagonists one by one. At the same time, Sakyo's successful bets on the protagonists have earned him an enormous amount of money.
25	"Kuwabara's Fight of Love" (Burn, Kuwabara! The Underlying Power of Love); Transliteration: "Moero Kuwabara! Ai no Sokojikara" (Japanese: 燃えろ桑原! 愛の底力)	Hitoyuki Matsui	Katsuyuki Sumisawa	Hitoyuki Matsui	April 10, 1993	April 6, 2003
Yusuke, Kuwabara, and Botan encounter the powerful Younger Toguro and Elder Toguro while Kurama tries to keep Hiei from carrying out his own personal plan of vengeance against Tarukane. At the same time, Sakyo has bet an enormous fortune on the victory of the protagonists, constituting all of his assets. Kuwabara's determination and love for Yukina enables him and Yusuke to defeat the Toguro Brothers, and Yukina prevents Hiei from killing Tarukane.
