= Kitsune (disambiguation) =

Kitsune are fox spirits in Japanese folklore.

Kitsune may also refer to:

== Myth and fiction ==
- Kuda-gitsune, a creature supposedly employed by Japanese kitsune-tsukai
- Kitsune (Time Hunter), the fourth in the series of Time Hunter novellas in the Doctor Who franchise
- Kitsune (Usagi Yojimbo), a fictional character in the comic book series Usagi Yojimbo
- Mitsune "Kitsune" Konno, a fictional character in the anime and manga series Love Hina
- Kitsune, a fictional character in the IDW Publishing comic book series Teenage Mutant Ninja Turtles

== Music ==
- Kitsuné Musique, a French-Japanese record label
- Kitsune (EP), a 2012 EP by Marriages
- Kitsune², an alias used by electronic musician Emma Essex

== Other uses ==
- Kitsune's wedding, a Japanese folkloric term for a sunshower
- Kitsune bakuchi, a dice game from Japan
- Kitsune Kon, an annual anime convention in Green Bay, United States
- Kitsune udon, a type of udon topped with aburaage (sweetened deep-fried tofu pockets) popular in the Kansai region, particularly Osaka
- Maison Kitsuné, a French-Japanese fashion brand and record label
