= Yu Yu Hakusho season 2 =

Season of television series

Yu Yu Hakusho
- Season 2
- No. of episodes: 41

Release
- Original network: Fuji Television
- Original release: April 17, 1993 – February 5, 1994

Season chronology
- ← Previous; Season 1 Next → Season 3

The second season of the Yu Yu Hakusho anime series, known as the Dark Tournament Saga, was directed by Noriyuki Abe and produced by Fuji Television, Yomiko Advertising and Studio Pierrot. The episodes were released in North America by Funimation. Like the rest of the series, it adapts Yoshihiro Togashi's Yu Yu Hakusho manga from the sixth through the thirteenth volumes over forty-one episodes. The episodes cover the story of Yusuke Urameshi and how his tenure as Spirit Detective led him to participate in the "Dark Tournament," a competition between demons to determine the strongest supernatural inhabitants of the Living World.

The season initially ran from April 17, 1993, to February 5, 1994, in Japan on Fuji Television. The first twenty-eight episodes of the English adaptation of the anime were aired between April and May 2003 on Cartoon Network's Toonami programming block. Yu Yu Hakusho was then removed from Toonami's listings until January 2004, when re-runs of the old episodes were shown. New episodes began airing in May 2004, with the last episodes of the saga shown in July 2004.

Four pieces of theme music are used for the episodes; one opening theme and three closing themes. The opening theme is "Hohoemi no Bakudan" (微笑みの爆弾; lit. 'Smile Bomb') by Matsuko Mawatari. The closing themes are "Homework ga Owaranai" (ホームワークが終わらない, Hōmuwāku ga Owaranai; lit. 'The Homework Never Ends'), used for the first four episodes, "Sayonara Bye Bye" (さよならbye bye; lit. 'Goodbye, Bye Bye'), also by Mawatari, used for the episodes 30-59, and "Unbalance na Kiss o Shite" (アンバランスなKISSをして, Anbaransu na Kisu o Shite; lit. 'Unbalanced Kissing') by Hiro Takahashi for all remaining episodes.

Twelve DVD compilations, each containing either three or four episodes of the saga, have been released by Funimation. The first compilation was released on December 10, 2002, and the twelfth on December 9, 2003. Two DVD collection boxes, each containing six of the twelve compilations, have also been released by Funimation. The first was released on July 27, 2004, and the second on October 26, 2004. A Blu-ray compilation was released by Funimation on August 9, 2011.

== Episodes ==
No.	Title	Directed by	Written by	Storyboard by	Original release date	English release date
26	"Toguro Returns" (Invitees To The Dark Tournament); Transliteration: "Ankoku Bujutsukai e no Shōtaisha" (Japanese: 暗黒武術会への招待者)	Shigeru Ueda	Hiroshi Hashimoto	Akihiro Enomoto	April 17, 1993	April 7, 2003
Yusuke Urameshi unexpectedly crosses paths with the Younger Toguro on a street intersection, who shows Yusuke a demonstration of his true strength in a parking garage. Yusuke is given an ultimatum, in that he must participate in the Dark Tournament two months ahead, organized by human crime lords and drawn in by fierce apparitions, or have him and his friends killed. Left no choice and feeling helpless, Yusuke and his allies begin a two-month training period. Soon after, Yusuke, along with Kazuma Kuwabara, Kurama, Hiei, and a mysterious masked fighter, band together aboard a ship leading to the Dark Tournament grounds.
27	"The Dark Tournament Begins" (Departure of Death! To The Island of Hell); Transliteration: "Shi no Funede! Jigoku no Shima e" (Japanese: 死の船出! 地獄の島へ)	Junya Koshiba	Yoshiyuki Ōhashi	Junya Koshiba	April 24, 1993	April 10, 2003
Team Urameshi finds out that the preliminary competition is on the ship itself. While Yusuke sleeps due to exhaustion from training, Kuwabara, Kurama, Hiei, and the masked fighter quickly dispose of the attacking competitors, qualifying for the next level of the tournament in the process. Upon arriving at the hotel, the five are briefly visited by Rinku and Zeru, two members of Team Rokuyukai.
28	"First Fight" (The Little Mighty Foe! Rinku's Secret Technique); Transliteration: "Chiisana Kyōteki! Rinku no Higi" (Japanese: 小さな強敵! 鈴駒の秘技)	Kazunori Mizuno	Sukehiro Tomita	Motosuke Takahashi	May 1, 1993	April 11, 2003
Koenma as well as Botan, Keiko Yukimura and Shizuru Kuwabara, come to witness the Dark Tournament. Kuwabara faces off against Rinku, the first member of Team Rokuyukai. Kuwabara is overwhelmed by Rinku's acrobatic maneuverability, almost being knocked out. Although Kuwabara displays his newfound ability to wield two spirit swords at once, he is unable to overcome Rinku's assault of yo-yos.
29	"Flowers of Blood" (Kurama Makes Blood Flowers Blossom); Transliteration: "Chi no Hana o Sakasu Kurama!" (Japanese: 血の花を咲かす蔵馬!)	Haruo Nakayama	Katsuyuki Sumisawa	Hitoyuki Matsui	May 8, 1993	April 12, 2003
Both Kuwabara and Rinku display the ability to control their spirit energies using their spirit sword and yo-yos, respectively. They both are pushed outside of the ring, yet Rinku manages to defeat Kuwabara. Kurama battles Roto, one who can morph his finger into a sickle, who threatens to have his brother kill Kurama's human mother. However, Kurama deceives Roto by conversing with him until a seed Kurama planted in Roto at the start of the round blooms, killing Roto from the inside.
30	"Dragon of the Darkness Flame" (The Unfinished Secret Technique — Ensatsu Kokuryuha); Transliteration: "Mikan no Ougi Ensatsu Kokuryūha" (Japanese: 未完の奥義·炎殺黒龍波)	Akiyuki Shinbo	Hiroshi Hashimoto	Akiyuki Shinbo	May 15, 1993	April 13, 2003
The leader of Team Rokuyukai, Zeru, challenges Hiei, who is seemingly overwhelmed by Zeru's initial fiery assault. However, Hiei uses the jagan eye, enabling him to shrug off the assault without a scratch. Hiei later uses his new technique, the dragon of the darkness flame, to obliterate Zeru. The final member of Team Rokuyukai is Chu, introduced as a drunkard. Yusuke finally wakes up from his long slumber to begin his match.
31	"Stumbling Warrior" (The Drunken Warrior! Chu's Sui-ken); Transliteration: "Yoidore Senshi! Chū no Suiken" (Japanese: よいどれ戦士! 酎の酔拳)	Hitoyuki Matsui	Yoshiyuki Ōhashi	Hitoyuki Matsui	May 22, 1993	April 14, 2003
Yusuke is annoyed by Chu's unpredictable movements, as he is constantly being pummeled to the ground. Yusuke shows his ability to use his spirit gun on each of his fingers on his right hand. Chu then unleashes his special attack, resembling much of the power of the spirit gun. They are evenly matched as both have exhausted all of their spirit energies.
32	"Knife Edge Death-Match"; Transliteration: "Naifu Ejji Desu Matchi" (Japanese: ナイフエッジデスマッチ)	Kazunori Mizuno	Kazunori Mizuno	Yoshiyuki Ōhashi	May 29, 1993	April 17, 2003
Yusuke and Chu agree to have a hand-to-hand combat with one foot pressed against the edge of a knife, with the loser receiving death at the hands of the victor. Keiko cannot stand to see Yusuke fight anymore, but Kuwabara explains that Yusuke must fight in a rematch with the Younger Toguro once more order to survive. Elsewhere, a recruit of the Toguro's Team makes a fashionably late entrance to greet his leader, still pandering whether or not Team Urameshi are worthy opponents for them when asked by the former. Yusuke brutally counters a headbutt executed by Chu, overcoming him. Though it was designed to be a death match, Yusuke spares Chu's life.
33	"A Day in Waiting" (Clash! The Best 8 are Decided); Transliteration: "Gekitotsu! Best 8 Desorō" (Japanese: 激突! ベスト8出そろう)	Shigeru Ueda	Sukehiro Tomita	Akihiro Enomoto	June 5, 1993	April 18, 2003
Yusuke realizes that he cannot use his spirit gun after encountering a member of the Spirit Warriors in a forest, who is shortly killed by his leader thereafter. Hiei endures the pain of a paralyzed right arm near the seashore after having used the dangerous technique from before. Upon returning to the stadium, Yusuke and Kuwabara watches as the Younger Toguro effortlessly defeats the Spirit Warriors by himself, of which the leader of the team had been acquainted by Yusuke earlier in the forest.
34	"Percentage of Victory" (A Desperate Battle, With a 0.05% Chance of Winning); Transliteration: "Shōritsu Rei Ten Rei Go Pāsento no Shitō" (Japanese: 勝率0.05%の死闘!)	Junya Koshiba	Katsuyuki Sumisawa	Junya Koshiba	June 12, 1993	April 19, 2003
Yusuke, Kuwabara, and the masked fighter participate in a three-on-three battle with Yen, Ryu, and Kai of Team Ichigaki. As the members of this team are revealed to be humans, they are unwittingly under the control of Dr. Ichigaki. After realizing this, they essentially refuse to fight and Team Ichigaki gains the upper hand very quickly. Meanwhile, Kurama and Hiei has to deal with two other members of Team Ichigaki, who unleash the robot Gatasval to attack the two.
35	"Glimpse Beneath the Mask" (The Identity of Mask?! A Beautiful Warrior); Transliteration: "Fukumen no Shōtai?! Utsukushiki Senshi" (Japanese: 覆面の正体?! 美しき戦士)	Akiyuki Shinbo	Hiroshi Hashimoto	Akiyuki Shinbo	June 19, 1993	April 20, 2003
The masked fighter saves Yusuke and Kuwabara from direct attacks by Team Ichigaki, later revealed to be a young woman with pink hair, yet her name is still unknown. Kurama and Hiei defeat Gatasval, mentioning how Dr. Ichigaki took command of Yen, Ryu, and Kai using the blood-saver node as his invention. The three shed tears of blood after Kuwabara uses himself as a human shield to bear the combined attack of the three. Yusuke takes them all on and is able to sense and counter their attacks.
36	"Ambition Destroyed: A Trial by Light" (Ambition Crushed! A Baptism by Light); Transliteration: "Yabō o Funsai! Hikari no Senrei" (Japanese: 野望を粉砕! 光りの洗礼)	Kazuhiro Ozawa	Yoshiyuki Ōhashi	Akihiro Enomoto	June 26, 1993	April 21, 2003
The masked fighter uses the spirit wave technique to remove the blood-saver node from their bodies, thereby defeating them. Dr. Ichigaki transforms himself into a monstrous creature as a last resort to win the battle, however he is quickly bested by an enraged Yusuke. Due to the mechanics of the spirit wave technique, it is realized that En, Ryu, and Kai are able to regain control of their bodies, as they make their way back home. Team Urameshi is forced to battle back-to-back with Team Masho, a group of shinobi, much to their chagrin.
37	"Master of Disguise" (Stealthy Figures of Darkness, The Mashotsukai Team); Transliteration: "Yami no Shinobi Mashōtsukai Team" (Japanese: 闇の忍·魔性使いチーム)	Akiyuki Shinbo	Sukehiro Tomita	Motosuke Takahashi	July 3, 1993	April 24, 2003
Kuwabara is unable to fight due to the attack by Team Ichigaki. Luka, the nurse of the Dark Tournament, is summoned to hold custody of Hiei and the masked fighter, creating a barrier around them, and rendering them unable to escape due to their depleted spirit energy. Kurama is to face off against Gama, who uses paint to immobilize his opponent. Kurama unexpectedly uses his rose whip with his hair to severely wound Gama, gradually bleeding to death.
38	"Kurama's Stand" (A Desperate Kurama! Bodypaint of Death); Transliteration: "Kurama Muzan! Shi no Keshō" (Japanese: 蔵馬無惨! 死の化粧)	Hitoyuki Matsui	Katsuyuki Sumisawa	Hitoyuki Matsui	July 10, 1993	April 25, 2003
Kurama's spirit energy is sealed by the dying efforts of Gama, as his paint was actually mixed with his blood. Kurama is to battle Toya, described as an ice master. Kurama breaks free of paralysis, but is denied access to his spirit energy. Toya attacks Kurama multiple times, but is unable to target his vital points. Kurama defeats Toya by implanting his plants into his own body to use as a weapon, however falling unconscious.
39	"Crushing Revenge" (Annihilation! Yusuke's Iron Fist of Fury); Transliteration: "Funsai! Yūsuke Ikari no Tekken" (Japanese: 粉砕! 幽助怒りの鉄拳)	Kazunori Mizuno	Hiroshi Hashimoto	Kazunori Mizuno	July 17, 1993	April 26, 2003
Bakken, another member of Team Mashotsukai, brutally assaults the comatose Kurama. Nevertheless, Kurama's life is spared after noticing Yusuke preparing to use his spirit gun in retaliation. Bakken uses his sweat glands to create a fog of mist in the ring, attacking a blindsided Yusuke. It is apparent, however, that Yusuke uses his spirit gun in order to clear the mist, making the ring visible. Yusuke punches Bakken in the stomach for payback of his cruelty, utterly damaging his thoracic cage and knocking him out of the ring. Jin, the wind user of Team Masho, then faces off against Yusuke, displaying the ability of flight.
40	"Jin, the Wind Master" (Jin, the Wind Tamer! A Stormy Air Battle); Transliteration: "Kazetsukai Jin! Arashi no Kuchūsen" (Japanese: 風使い陣! 嵐の空中戦)	Junya Koshiba	Yoshiyuki Ōhashi	Junya Koshiba	July 24, 1993	April 27, 2003
Jin uses his tornado fist to land a hit on Yusuke, who is literally blown away from the attack. Yusuke later counterattacks with a series of punches, yet Jin flies after being hit in the stomach. Yusuke then uses the spirit gun on him, only to see Jin create a whirlwind to deflect the blast. When Jin dives down from the sky using tornado fist a second time, Yusuke uses spirit gun again to cause a mass explosion, however both are surprising still alive. Both contenders prepare for their ultimate attacks.
41	"Reverse Decisions" (Reikodan! An Unexpected Conclusion?!); Transliteration: "Reikōdan! Igai Na Ketchaku?!" (Japanese: 霊光弾! 意外な決着?!)	Akiyuki Shinbo	Sukehiro Tomita	Akiyuki Shinbo	July 31, 1993	April 28, 2003
While Jin has initiated a double tornado fist, Yusuke begins to use the spirit wave technique. After disabling both fists, Yusuke catapults Jin out of the ring, overcoming him. Before Yusuke is about to fight with the next opponent of Team Masho, it has been realized that he has been disqualified by a technicality. Yukina arrives outside the stadium, meeting up with Botan, Keiko, and Shizuru. Kuwabara, though still seriously injured volunteers himself to fight the last battle against Risho, the leader of the team.
42	"A Matter of Love and Death" (A Desperate Kuwabara! The Charge of Love); Transliteration: "Kesshi no Kuwabara! Ai no Totsugeki" (Japanese: 決死の桑原! 愛の突撃)	Masami Shimoda	Katsuyuki Sumisawa	Noriyuki Abe	August 7, 1993	May 1, 2003
Risho easily inflicts further pain upon Kuwabara. He later unleashes his earth powers, initially overwhelming Kuwabara, who is able to stand up to his feet and every critical hit. Kuwabara sees Yukina in the audience, who has arrived to gives him moral support, in which he manages to overcome his injuries and defeats Risho with his spirit sword.
43	"The Masked Fighter Revealed" (The Masked Warrior's Stern Face); Transliteration: "Fukumen Senshi no Kubishiki Sugao" (Japanese: 覆面戦士の厳しき素顔)	Shigeru Ueda	Hiroshi Hashimoto	Shigeru Ueda	August 14, 1993	May 2, 2003
The spirit beast of Yusuke, as his ordeal succeeding his death a year ago, has hatched, resembling that of a penguin, now named Puu. Team Urameshi catches a glimpse of Team Toguro in the stadium. The masked fighter takes Yusuke into the forest to reveal herself to be Genkai. She begins the final step of training in order to perfect Yusuke's spirit gun.
44	"Yusuke's Final Test" (The Greatest Trial from Genkai); Transliteration: "Genkai Kara no Saidai no Shiren" (Japanese: 幻海からの最大の試練)	Hitoyuki Matsui	Yoshiyuki Ōhashi	Hitoyuki Matsui	August 21, 1993	May 3, 2003
Yusuke is told that he must take Genkai's life in order to take her power and to meet Genkai in the nearby cave when he has decided. After a time, Yusuke goes to the cave to find Genkai only to tell her that there is no way he could take the life of the only person that has even taught him anything useful in his life and refuses to kill her. Genkai then tells Yusuke that was the right answer. She had never wanted to give her power to someone who would be okay with killing her for it. Genkai goes on to create a spirit wave orb and fuses it into Yusuke's body telling him the pain would be excruciating and would either fuse with his body or tear him apart from the inside out. Meanwhile, as the semifinal rounds begin, the remaining members of Team Urameshi prepare to face off against Team Uraotogi. In the first match, Hiei fights the ogreish fighter Makintaro, slicing off his left arm. Even when Makintaro transforms his arm into an ax, Hiei effortlessly dispatches him.
45	"Hiei Battles On" (Hiei Battles Consecutively! Shoot Your Kokuryuha!); Transliteration: "Hiei Rensen! Ute Kokuryūha!" (Japanese: 飛影連戦! 撃て黒龍波!)	Akiyuki Shinbo	Sukehiro Tomita	Motosuke Takahashi	August 28, 1993	May 4, 2003
Yusuke struggles as he bears the pain of the spirit wave orb within him. Even when Genkai attempts to remove it, Yusuke still chooses to handle the torture. Hiei is to battle Kuro Momotaro, able to transform with apelike instincts, making Hiei's techniques useless. Unable to use the dragon of the darkness flame, lest it consume him in the process, Hiei is left with dwindling options.
46	"Many Faces, Many Forms" (Tremble! Kuromomotaro's Transformation); Transliteration: "Senritsu! Kuromomotarō no Henshin" (Japanese: 戦慄! 黒桃太郎の変身)	Junya Koshiba	Katsuyuki Sumisawa	Junya Koshiba	September 4, 1993	May 5, 2003
As Kuro Momotaro then transforms with birdlike qualities, Hiei's attacks are proven ineffective. Kuro Momotaro later transforms with wolfish capabilities, forcing Hiei to use his powers in an unorthodox fashion by channeling the dragon of the darkness flame through his sword in order to dispatch Kuro Momotaro. Kurama is to fight the unwitting Ura Urashima, as it is the rose whip versus the fishing pole whip, in which a telepathic conversation between the two leads to deception of the former. Kurama is introduced to the Idunn Box, reverting to his demon form, Yoko Kurama, as the ring is covered in fog.
47	"Legendary Bandit: Yoko Kurama" (The Legendary Thief! Yoko Kurama); Transliteration: "Densetsu no Tōsoku! Yōko Kurama" (Japanese: 伝説の盗賊! 妖狐·蔵馬)	Akiyuki Shinbo	Hiroshi Hashimoto	Akiyuki Shinbo	September 11, 1993	May 8, 2003
It is explained that Kurama had gone into human form fifteen years past, recovering his spirit energy from when he was a fox demon. While Yoko Kurama grows a manlike tree, having acidic saliva to melt its prey. He interrogates Ura Urashima to discover the secret of the Idun Box, however Ura Urashima is murdered by Shishiwakamaru, the leader of Team Uraotogi, before he can reveal any information, clearing the fog. Kuwabara is chosen to fight against Shishiwakamaru after a game of rock-paper-scissors, much to the dismay of Kurama and Hiei. Puu flies to Yusuke inside the cave in order to nurture him with water to ease his ongoing pain. Yusuke opens his eyes when he feels the relief of the water dripping into his mouth and sees Puu, just like him, struggling in pain but doing his best to overcome it so he can care for Yusuke. Seeing this, Yusuke is touched and says how sorry he is for letting Puu down. As Puu continues to struggle to get Yusuke more water, he falls to the ground. Above Puu Yusuke sees a huge boulder about to fall. Yusuke, though still in tremendous pain, gets up and rushes towards Puu and with new power and a resulting explosion the boulder is decimated saving Puu. Soon after, Yusuke is seen walking towards Genkai. He asks her to please take care of Puu for him. Genkai greatly relieved smiles and tells Yusuke he's finally completed the training. Yusuke falls to the ground in exhaustion and says he's going to sleep.
48	"The Cape of No Return" (Item of Darkness: The Mantle of Death); Transliteration: "Yami Item Shide no Hagoromo" (Japanese: 闇アイテム·死出の羽衣)	Masami Shimoda	Yoshiyuki Ōhashi	Masami Shimoda	September 18, 1993	May 9, 2003
As Kuwabara fights against Shishiwakamaru with the spirit sword, the latter quickly sends the former through the cape of no return, transporting him outside of the ring. Kuwabara lands in another stadium, meeting up with Botan, Keiko, Shizuru, and Yukina. Shishiwakamaru then is to battle the masked fighter, as to which Genkai is shown now as elderly and not youthful from before. The legality of the battle is called into question, concerning the occurrence of disqualification. After the match has been approved thanks to Younger Toguro intervening and explaining the situation to the entire stadium, Shishiwakamaru unsheathes his banshee shriek sword. Kuwabara, Botan, Keiko, Shizuru, and Yukina find Yusuke and Pu in the forest on their way to the semifinals stadium.
49	"Genkai's Strength" (Remaining Power! Genkai's Life or Death Battle); Transliteration: "Nokosareta Chikara! Genkai no Shitō" (Japanese: 残された力! 幻海の死闘)	Shigeru Ueda	Sukehiro Tomita	Akihiro Enomoto	September 25, 1993	May 10, 2003
Shishiwakamaru twirls his banshee shriek sword to resonance the shrill call of the reaper, disturbing the ears of the audience. Moreover, he dissipates the chorus of a thousand skulls from the sword and devours much of the audience. Kuwabara arrives as Shishiwakamaru forms the cage of hell, trapping Genkai. It is then that Genkai turns the tables on Shishiwakamaru by using her spirit reflection blast against his attack. Kuwabara must now face off against Onji, who appears to be just an old man.
50	"Suzuka's Challenge" (Demon Battler Suzuki's Challenge!); Transliteration: "Matōka Suzuki no Chōsen" (Japanese: 魔闘家·鈴木の挑戦!)	Junya Koshiba	Katsuyuki Sumisawa	Junya Koshiba	October 2, 1993	May 11, 2003
Keiko is almost attacked by demons in the forest, but is saved by the appearance of Chu, Rinku, Jin, and Toya. They note that Yusuke has become stronger. Onji creates the dimensional travel sphere and sends Kuwabara back to the other stadium. This elderly fighter then reveals himself to be the clownish Suzuki, as Genkai is elected to fight him. Suzuki strives to be known as a god after first defeating Genkai. He whooshes his rainbow cyclone attack on an unharmed Genkai, who abruptly takes his rubber nose. The two engage in hand-to-hand combat, as Suzuki demonstrates his body of steel muscle explosion technique. Yet despite this, Genkai easily defeats him.
51	"Arch-Rivals" (Confrontation of Destiny! The Shadow of Toguro); Transliteration: "Shukumei no Taiketsu! Toguro no Kage" (Japanese: 宿命の対決! 戸愚呂の影)	Hitoyuki Matsui	Hiroshi Hashimoto	Hitoyuki Matsui	October 9, 1993	May 12, 2003
Three members of Team Toguro demonstrate their power on another team in the semifinals. Kuwabara watches over Yusuke in the hotel room, Kurama spectates the fights, and Hiei goes to the seashore to improve his technique. Team Toguro utterly slaughters this team with minimal effort. Genkai meets with the Younger Toguro in the forest, mentioning a conflict between them from fifty years ago. Yusuke wakes up and runs into the forest after sensing the Younger Toguro's immense spirit energy.
52	"The Death of Genkai" (Genkai Falls! Settled After 50 Years); Transliteration: "Genkai Chiru! 50 Nen Me no Ketchaku" (Japanese: 幻海散る! 50年目の決着)	Akiyuki Shinbo	Yoshiyuki Ōhashi	Akiyuki Shinbo	October 16, 1993	May 15, 2003
It is explained that Genkai and the Younger Toguro were once a pair fifty years back, however the Younger Toguro was greedy for eternal youth and ultimate strength. The Younger Toguro confronts and battles a weakened Genkai. Despite a final effort using her feeble energy, Genkai is overwhelmed by Toguro and becomes mortally wounded as Yusuke arrives. Giving Yusuke her dying words, she passes away and the Younger Toguro subsequently launches an enraged Yusuke through the forest. It is then that Yusuke reminisces of when he trained under Genkai, mourning for her death.
53	"Overcoming Grief" (Before the Storm! Overcoming Sorrow); Transliteration: "Arashi no Mae! Kanashimi o Koete" (Japanese: 嵐の前! 悲しみを越えて)	Kazunori Mizuno	Sukehiro Tomita	Motosuke Takahashi	October 23, 1993	May 16, 2003
Suzuki encounters Kuwabara and Kurama, giving them an elixir and a hilt, respectively, to enhance their natural abilities. Koenma finds Yusuke in deep depression over Genkai. Sakyo proposes to make a portal between the Spirit World and the Living World. Yusuke is motivated to prepare himself for the final round against Team Toguro.
54	"The Beginning of the End" (The Turbulent Final Round Begins!); Transliteration: "Haran no Kesshō Sen Kaishi!" (Japanese: 波瀾の決勝戦開始!)	Junya Koshiba	Katsuyuki Sumisawa	Shinsaku Kouzuma	October 30, 1993	April 24, 2004
Team Urameshi, now with ameliorative spirit energies, are ready for the final round begins, with Sakyo and Koenma arriving to fill the vacancies on each of their teams. The first match begins with Kurama facing Karasu.
55	"The Beast Within" (Explosion! The Yoko Awakened); Transliteration: "Bakuretsu! Mezameta Yōko" (Japanese: 爆烈! 目覚めた妖狐)	Masami Shimoda	Katsuyuki Sumisawa	Masami Shimoda	November 6, 1993	May 8, 2004
Karasu's bomb abilities overwhelm Kurama's plants. Just when all seemed grim, Kurama transforms into Yoko Kurama, due to ingesting the fruit of previous life he received from Suzuki before the fight. Attaining new and improved abilities, Yoko Kurama's demon plants prove too much for Karasu to handle.
56	"Yoko's Magic" (The Desperate Kurama! A Final Measure); Transliteration: "Kesshi no Kurama! Saigo no Shudan" (Japanese: 決死の蔵馬! 最後の手段)	Shigeru Ueda	Yoshiyuki Ōhashi	Akihiro Enomoto	November 13, 1993	May 15, 2004
Kurasu loses his mask, the only thing inhibiting his full power. He unleashes a massive explosion, seemingly killing Yoko Kurama, and although he survived, however, the fruit of previous life reaches its time limit and Yoko Kurama reverts into his human form, giving Karasu the advantage. In response, Kurama plays on Karasu's overconfidence, and uses a desperate final attack to secure victory.
57	"Beneath Bui's Armor" (Intimidation! Bui Removes his Armor); Transliteration: "Kyōi! Yoroi o Hazushita Bui" (Japanese: 脅威! 鎧を外した武威)	Junya Koshiba	Katsuyuki Sumisawa	Junya Koshiba	November 20, 1993	May 22, 2004
Despite Karasu's death, Kurama loses the fight on a technicality. Hiei begins to fight Bui, able to deal with his immense ax attacks with little effort. Bui is later forced to remove his armor in order to effectively fight Hiei.
58	"Wielder of the Dragon" (The Ultimate Secret Technique! Roar of the Kokuryuha); Transliteration: "Kyūkyoku Ougi! Hoero Kokuryūha" (Japanese: 究極奥義! ほえろ黒龍波)	Akiyuki Shinbo	Katsuyuki Sumisawa	Akiyuki Shinbo	November 27, 1993	May 29, 2004
In response to Bui's increased abilities, Hiei uses the dragon of the darkness flame. Although Bui reflects the attacks back to Hiei, Hiei absorbs the flames, drastically increasing his physical abilities. Bui is later defeated in the process. Hiei goes into hibernation after having drained all his spirit energy.
59	"The Shadow of Elder Toguro" (The Eerie Shadow of Toguro the Elder); Transliteration: "Toguro Ani no Bukimi na Kage" (Japanese: 戸愚呂兄の不気味な影)	Hitoyuki Matsui	Hiroshi Hashimomto	Hitoyuki Matsui	December 4, 1993	June 5, 2004
A long intermission is called for replacing the ring after it was highly damaged. Kuwabara fights the Elder Toguro, and grows incensed when he is the last to learn of Genkai's death. However, the Elder Toguro's regenerative abilities makes Kuwabara's attacks useless.
60	"Sakyo's Proposal" (Explosion of Anger! Kuwabara's Counterattack); Transliteration: "Ikari Bakuhatsu! Kuwabara no Hangeki" (Japanese: 怒り爆発! 桑原の反撃)	Haruo Nakayama	Sukehiro Tomita	Takeshi Mori	December 11, 1993	June 12, 2004
Using the trial sword given to him by Suzuki, Kuwabara manages to crush the Elder Toguro, ensuring him the victory. Due to Sakyo feeling that a fight with Koenma would be meaningless, he bets his life on victory of the Younger Toguro, and Koenma follows suit. Sakyo explains to the Younger Toguro how his gambling obsession first emerged. Despite the survival of the Elder Toguro, who gloats over the wagers placed between the two fighters, the Younger Toguro denied his assistance in the battle against Yusuke and kicks him off the island.
61	"Yusuke vs. Toguro" (Confrontation of Destiny! The Tempestuous Battle of Captains Commences); Transliteration: "Shukumei no Taiketsu! Arashi no Taishōsen Kaishi" (Japanese: 宿命の対決! 嵐の大将戦開始)	Akiyuki Shinbo	Yoshiyuki Ōhashi	Motosuke Takahashi	December 18, 1993	June 19, 2004
Rinku, Chu, Toya, and Jin come to watch the final match between Yusuke and the Younger Toguro. The fight becomes a standstill, as both contestants prepare to attack. Yusuke shoots a massive spirit gun blast that sends the Younger Toguro out of the stadium. However, the Younger Toguro returns, surprisingly uninjured by Yusuke's attack.
62	"Toguro's Full Power" (Toguro's 100 Percent Terror!); Transliteration: "Toguro Hyaku Pāsento no Kyōfu!" (Japanese: 戸愚呂100%の恐怖!)	Shigeru Ueda	Katsuyuki Sumisawa	Akihiro Enomoto	January 8, 1994	June 26, 2004
Yusuke removes the spirit cuffs from the arms and legs, chained to him by Genkai, unlocking the full power of his spirit energy. Even after Yusuke inflicts a barrage of hits towards the Younger Toguro, the latter remains uninjured. The Younger Toguro presents one hundred percent of his total strength, overwhelming Yusuke.
63	"Yusuke's Despair" (Yusuke! A Trial to the Limits of Sorrow); Transliteration: "Yūsuke! Genkai e no Kanashii Shiren" (Japanese: 幽助! 限界への悲しい試練)	Masami Shimoda	Hiroshi Hashimoto	Masami Shimoda	January 15, 1994	July 3, 2004
Yusuke is reminded of his childhood life with Keiko when she cries out his name during the battle. Genkai possess Pu and suggests the Younger Toguro to kill one of Yusuke's friends in order to increase his power exponentially. The Younger Toguro choose Kuwabara to die at his hands.
64	"Toguro's Desire" (Deathbattle Concluded! A Final Full Power); Transliteration: "Shitō Ketchaku! Saigo no Furu Pawā" (Japanese: 死闘決着! 最後のフルパワー)	Junya Koshiba	Sukehiro Tomita	Junya Koshiba	January 22, 1994	July 10, 2004
With Kuwabara dead, Yusuke's power rises with his grief. In response, Toguro powers to one hundred and twenty percent of his total power. As the two clash, Toguro manages to block the final blast of Yusuke's spirit gun, but ends up crumbling down in defeat after its completion.
65	"Out With a Bang" (The Scheme Vanishes, Together With the Stadium); Transliteration: "Tōgijō to Tomoni Kieru Yabō" (Japanese: 闘技場と共に消える野望)	Hitoyuki Matsui	Yoshiyuki Ōhashi	Hitoyuki Matsui	January 29, 1994	July 17, 2004
It is quite a shock that Kuwabara is actually alive, as his vital points were not damaged. To fulfill his promise of defeat, Sakyo commits suicide by detonating the stadium, with the participants and spectators barely able to escape, destroying all his progress in his proposal. Keiko, feeling catatonic, is unresponsive to Botan's voice, and Yusuke later slaps her back to her senses. The protagonists make it out alive at the last minute.
66	"Toguro's Wish" (Toguro's Atonement — His Greatest Desire); Transliteration: "Toguro no Tsugunai. Ichiban no Nozomi" (Japanese: 戸愚呂の償い・一番の望み)	Akiyuki Shinbo	Yoshiyuki Ōhashi	Akiyuki Shinbo	February 5, 1994	July 24, 2004
The protagonists prepare to sail home since the tournament has ended. In the Spirit World, the Younger Toguro demands to go to the most brutal level of the underworld to repent for his deeds in life. It is explained that the Younger Toguro had been psychologically scarred fifty years ago by a demon named Kairin, who killed all the students of his dojo. Genkai confront the Younger Toguro for blaming himself for his wrongdoings. Genkai is resurrected in the Living World as the prize for winning the tournament.
