= Queenstown =

Queenstown is the name of several human settlements around the world, nearly all in countries that are part of the Commonwealth of Nations.

Queenstown may refer to:

== Places currently named Queenstown ==
- Queenstown, Alberta, a hamlet in Canada
- Queenstown, Blackpool, an area of Blackpool, Lancashire, England
- Queenstown, Guyana, in Guyana
- Queenstown, Maryland, a town in the United States
- Queenstown, New Zealand, a resort town in Otago, New Zealand
- Queenstown, Singapore, a residential town in Singapore
- Queenstown, South Australia, a suburb of Adelaide, Australia
- Queenstown, Tasmania, a town in Tasmania, Australia
- Queenstown, Virginia, United States
- Queenstown, Wisconsin, an unincorporated community in the United States

== Places formerly named Queenstown ==
- Cobh, a town in Ireland
- Port Clements, British Columbia, Canada
- Queenston, Ontario, Canada
- St Andrews, Victoria, Australia
- Victoria, Hong Kong
- Queenstown, South Africa, now known as Komani

== See also ==
- Queensborough (disambiguation)
- Queenston (disambiguation)
- Queenstown Airport (disambiguation)
- Queenstown station (disambiguation)
- Queensland, an Australian state
- Shaftesbury and Queenstown (ward), an electoral division in London, England
