= Yu Yu Hakusho: Tournament Tactics =

- Developers: Sensory Sweep Studios; Screaming Games
- Publisher: Atari
- Platform: Game Boy Advance
- Release: NA: November 18, 2004; PAL: February 25, 2005
- Genre: Tactical role-playing
- Modes: Single-player, multiplayer

Yu Yu Hakusho: Tournament Tactics is a video game for the Game Boy Advance. It is based on the manga and anime series YuYu Hakusho created by Yoshihiro Togashi. The plot follows the protagonist Yusuke Urameshi, a teenage delinquent who dies in an accident and is brought back to life as a "Spirit Detective", a protector of the living world. Tournament Tactics specifically adapts the Dark Tournament story arc of the manga, in which Yusuke and his companions participate in a deadly, demon martial arts competition.

Tournament Tactics is a tactical role-playing game. Gameplay involves having the player move up to five characters on a grid-like battlefield, engage enemy units, and complete objectives. As player characters gain experience points, they level up, improving their statistics and granting them access to special "spirit attacks". Tournament Tactics was co-developed by Sensory Sweep Studios and Screaming Games as part of a publishing deal for Atari to distribute YuYu Hakusho games outside Japan. Tournament Tactics is the third Yu Yu Hakusho game that never saw a release in Japan.

== Game modes ==
Destroy All Enemies - in this game mode, the player must destroy a set number of enemies. This battle type can be broken down into two sub types. It can be a Floodgate battle, in which floodgate statues spontaneously produce more enemies until destroyed. It could also be a Timed battle, in which all enemies must be destroyed in a set number of moves.

Pursuit - in a Pursuit battle, the player must chase down and destroy a turtle demon in a track suit. This must be done before the runner reaches a blue square on the map.

Timed Destination - the player must guide at least one member of the team to a red square on the map. Demons are interspersed around the map to hinder the player.

Timed Floodgate - this variation of the Floodgate battle is a combination between Timed Battle and Destroy All Enemies. The player must wait a set amount of time on a red square on the map until the floodgates are destroyed. After the floodgates are destroyed the player must destroy the remaining demons.

== Playable characters ==
- Yusuke
- Kuwabara
- Hiei
- Kurama
- Masked Fighter
- Rinku
- Chu
- Jin
- Yukina
- Toya

== Reception ==
Reception

Aggregate score
Aggregator	Score
Metacritic	43 out of 100

Review scores
Publication	Score
GamesMaster	55%
GameZone	4.6 out of 10
NGC Magazine	2/5
Nintendo Power	2/5

The game received "generally unfavorable reviews" according to the review aggregation website Metacritic.
