= Queenston (disambiguation) =

Queenston may refer to:

== Places ==
- Queenston, a town in Ontario, Canada
- Queenston Road or Queenston Street, part of Ontario Highway 8
- Jugtown Historic District called Queenston in New Jersey
- Lewiston–Queenston Bridge or Queenston Bridge
- Queenston Formation, a geological formation of Upper Ordovician age that outcrops in Ontario and New York
- Queenston Delta, a clastic wedge of sediment deposited over eastern North America during the late Ordovician period

== Music ==
- Jackal Queenston, an alias used by electronic artist Emma Essex
- Renard Queenston, an alias used by electronic artist Emma Essex

== Military ==
- Battle of Queenston Heights or Battle of Queenston, a battle hear the town of Queenston
- Queenston-class, a ship class in the Joint Support Ship Project
  - HMCS Queenston, a Queenston-class naval auxiliary

== Animals ==
- Queenston Stakes, Canadian thoroughbred race

== See also ==
- Queenston Heights, a promontory near Queenston, Ontario
- Queenstown (disambiguation)
- Queensborough (disambiguation)
