= Yu Yu Hakusho: Dark Tournament =

2004 video game

- European version box art
- Developer: Digital Fiction
- Publisher: Atari
- Producer: Nick Ahern
- Designer: Pierre-Francis Lafleur
- Programmer: Phillipe Gagnon
- Writer: Brent Bradford
- Composer: Stephen Angelini
- Series: Yu Yu Hakusho
- Platform: PlayStation 2
- Release: NA: September 28, 2004; EU: July 15, 2005
- Genre: Fighting
- Modes: Single-player, multiplayer

Yu Yu Hakusho: Dark Tournament is a video game for the PS2 home game console. Based on the manga series YuYu Hakusho created by Yoshihiro Togashi, Dark Tournament follows the protagonist Yusuke Urameshi, a rebellious teenager who dies and is brought back to life in order to serve as a "Spirit Detective", solving cases involving apparitions and demons within the living world. The game covers the Dark Tournament story arc in which Yusuke and his allies are invited by a powerful demon named Toguro to participate in a deadly martial arts tournament.

Dark Tournament is a 3D versus fighting game where the player progresses by completing specific objectives tied to a combat system. These objectives range from following simple commands to full-out battles with opponent characters. Each unique character can utilize a number of basic moves as well as stronger "spirit" attacks. Dark Tournament was developed by Digital Fiction and published by Atari in North America and Europe as part of a distribution deal for the latter. Both the animation company Pierrot and English licensor Funimation (currently Crunchyroll) had limited involvement in the game's production. Dark Tournament is the second Yu Yu Hakusho game that never saw release in Japan.

Critical reception for Dark Tournament has been average or mixed. While most reviewers appreciated the game as visually and audibly appealing to fans of the anime series, they judged it as falling short within the fighting genre due to flaws with its controls and certain gameplay mechanics.

== Plot and gameplay ==
Yu Yu Hakusho: Dark Tournament is based on the successful manga and anime series YuYu Hakusho created by Yoshihiro Togashi. The plot follows protagonist Yusuke Urameshi, a teenage delinquent who is struck by a car and killed while trying to save a young child. After completing many afterlife tasks presented to him, Yusuke is revived and appointed as a "Spirit Detective", a protector of the human world from various apparitions and demons. Dark Tournament retells the story arc of the same name. After accepting an invitation by a seemingly invincible demon named Toguro, Yusuke and his companions travel to a deadly, demon martial arts tournament where the winners may claim any prize desired.

A match between Kuwabara and Risho. The game's head-up display shows the remaining match time and each character's health and spirit meter.

Dark Tournament is a fighting game that relies on a proprietary combat system. The player can move within a straight line on a 3D arena. The purpose of each battle is to deplete an opponent's health while maintaining one's own, although a participant may win by forcing an opponent out of the ring. Each of the game's 25 player characters has a specific set of basic punches, kicks, blocks, throws, and combo moves. In addition, a meter located below each fighter's health will fill as they exchange hits with each other; characters have access to powerful "spirit" attacks once this meter fills. Dark Tournament features a story mode which is divided into 31 chapters, progressing linearly through the plot of the manga and anime. The mode features different objectives relating to the narrative. For instance, one chapter requires the player to trade blows with the drunken master Chu in a match that restricts either character from moving or dodging. Other chapters allow the player to use multiple characters in battle with a tag team system.

Other, optional gameplay modes include a training mode for learning each character's moves; an arcade mode, where the player fights through a series of chosen opponents; a multiplayer Skirmish mode; and a token minigame, which plays like a modified version of the card game War. Initially, only five characters (Yusuke, Kuwabara, Kurama, Hiei, and The Masked Fighter) are playable in these modes. However, as the player advances through the story mode, other characters are added to playable roster, alternate costumes are made available, more tokens can be used in the token game, and two extra modes (Survival and Dark Tournament Plus) are unlocked.

== Development ==
Yu Yu Hakusho: Dark Tournament was developed by Digital Fiction and published by Atari. The YuYu Hakusho anime adaptation by Studio Pierrot had begun airing in North America on Cartoon Network in 2002, where it proved popular on the afternoon Toonami block. In July 2003, Atari established a publishing agreement with Funimation Entertainment, the English licensor of the anime adaptation series. Prior to this deal, games based on the series had never been made available to English-speaking audiences in North America, Europe or Australia. Atari had previously published games based another successful Funimation property, Dragon Ball Z. Atari released its first game Yu Yu Hakusho: Spirit Detective for the Game Boy Advance in December 2003 and announced Dark Tournament just before the Electronic Entertainment Expo in May 2004.

According to Atari senior producer Mark Flitman, Dark Tournament was in development for about a year and a half. Despite a comparable visual appearance to the Dragon Ball Z: Budokai series, Dark Tournament does not share the same technology as those titles. The game uses Digital Fiction's own PS2 technology, which they optimized with more lighting and special effects. Flitman elaborated that their similar aesthetics were intentional in order to appeal to fans of the show. Dark Tournament was intended to be "a YuYu Hakusho game first, a fighting game second". The game utilizes animated sequences from the English dub of the anime series and voice clips from the Funimation voice cast. The developer, composed of "big fans of YuYu Hakusho and Dragon Ball Z", attempted to add a large amount of variety to the game with unlockables and the token minigame for added replay value. Digital Fiction also included a newly animated, two-minute summary of the Dark Tournament arc, produced by Fuji Creative, Pierrot, and Funimation. The game was released in North America on September 28, 2004, and later in Europe on July 15, 2005.

== Reception ==
Reception

Aggregate score
Aggregator	Score
Metacritic	56 out of 100

Review scores
Publication	Score
1Up.com	C
Game Informer	3.25 out of 10
GamesMaster	59%
GameSpot	6.9 out of 10
IGN	5.9 out of 10
Official U.S. PlayStation Magazine	2.5/5
PlayStation: The Official Magazine	5 out of 10
VideoGamer.com	4 out of 10

Atari reported "reasonable" sales of Yu Yu Hakusho: Dark Tournament, despite an overall net loss for the company during the game's release quarter. Dark Tournament received "mixed" reviews according to the review aggregation website Metacritic. Although most reviewers agreed that the aesthetic features of the games are appropriate for fans of the manga of anime, they denoted Dark Tournament as a poor fighting game overall, mainly faulting its controls and certain gameplay mechanics. 1UP.com's David Beaudoin noticed little difference in the characters themselves, each offering similar movesets and insignificant specials, and noted the game's sluggish time response and slow animation. Jeremy Dunham of IGN and Tom Orry of VideoGamer.com were also unimpressed, stating that the game's combination attacks are lethargic and inaccurate. Both reviewers berated the way an opponent can attack during the long periods it takes to perform more complex actions. Dunham noted an unbalanced level of challenge in the story mode, in which enemies are "both ruthless and clueless simultaneously". GameSpot writer Ryan Davis contrarily found the controls to be simple and responsive, but respectively agreed with Beaudion on the lack of move diversity between characters and with Dunham on its slow pace.

Dunham praised the variety of objectives in the story mode chapters as the game's "saving grace", and positively compared the team battle option in skirmish mode to Marvel vs. Capcom and Tekken Tag Tournament. Beaudoin was indifferent about the extra diversionary modes, while Davis called the additional fighting modes "predictable" and the token game "rather out of place in the context of a simple fighting game". Beaudoin, Dunham, and Orry all credited the cel-shaded graphics, sound effects, and music as faithful to the anime series. Beaudoin enjoyed the "bright and detailed" visuals, the interjection of FMV sequences straight from the anime, the use of the Funimation voice cast, and destructible backgrounds. For the most part, Davis appreciated the translation of the 3D from their 2D counterparts and the effects used for the spirit attacks. Though he felt there was an "air of authenticity" from the new dialogue, he considered the game characters' acting as "silly". Davis additionally felt the sound design and "rather understated music" was aimed for consistency with the source material rather than a strive for high-quality.
