= Queensborough =

Queensborough or Queensboro may refer to:

== Places and geographic features ==
- Queens, one of the five boroughs of New York City
- Queensborough, New Westminster, a neighbourhood in New Westminster, British Columbia, Canada; also the original name of that city
- Queensborough, Ontario, Canada, an unincorporated community
- Queensborough River, a river in Victoria and New South Wales, Australia
- Queensboro Hill, Queens, a hill in Flushing, Queens, New York City
- Queensboro Ward, a former municipal ward in the city of Ottawa, Canada

== Bridges ==
- Queensborough Bridge, linking the New Westminster neighbourhood to the rest of New Westminster, in British Columbia, Canada
- Queensboro Bridge, over the East River in New York City connecting the boroughs of Queens and Manhattan

== Subway systems ==
- Queensborough Line, former name of a portion of the IRT Flushing Line of the New York City subway system
- Queensboro Plaza (New York City Subway), a subway station

== Other uses ==
- Queensborough Community College in the City University of New York system, New York City, United States
- Queensboro Corporation, a defunct real estate company in Queens, New York City
- Queensboro FC, an upcoming professional soccer team in Queens, New York City
- Queensboro Correctional Facility, one of the New York state prisons in the United States

== See also ==
- Queenborough, Isle of Sheppey, Kent, England
- HMAS Queenborough, a Q-class destroyer in the Royal Navy and Royal Australian Navy
- Queensburgh, KwaZulu-Natal in South Africa
- Queenstown (disambiguation)
- Queenston (disambiguation)
