= Justin Cook =

American voice actor

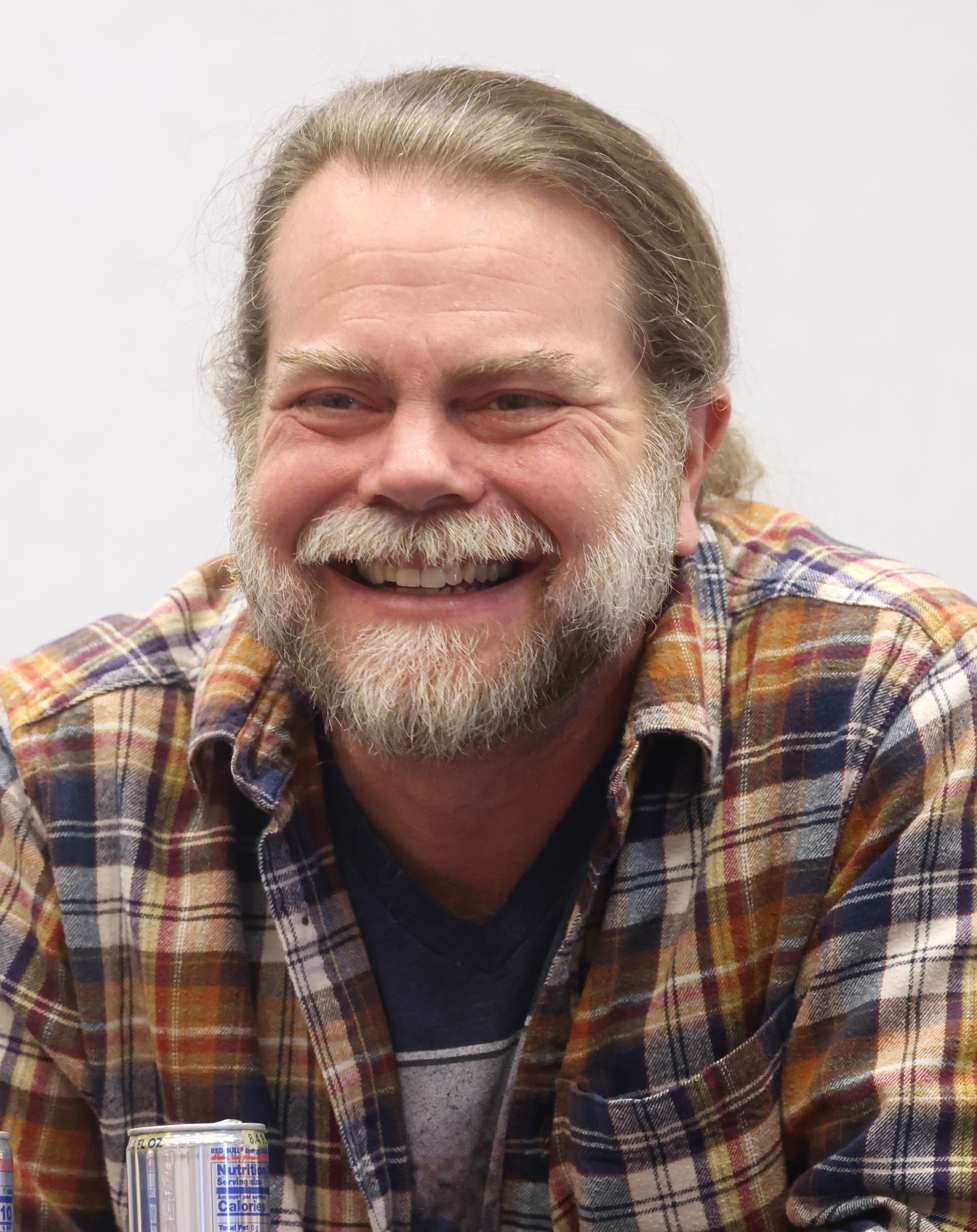
- Cook in 2025
- Occupations: Voice actor; voice director; audio engineer; line producer
- Years active: 1992–present

Justin Cook is an American voice actor, voice director, audio engineer and line producer who works for anime-dubbing companies Funimation and Okratron 5000. His work includes acting on YuYu Hakusho and the Dragon Ball franchise.

== Filmography ==
=== Voice roles ===
==== Anime dubbing ====
- Aquarion - Kurt Click
- Aquarion Evol - Donar
- Assassination Classroom - Akira Takaoka
- Attack on Titan - Jurgen
- Baccano! - Dune
- Basilisk - Yashamaru
- BECK: Mongolian Chop Squad - Tsunemi Chiba
- Big Windup! - Hiroyuki Oda
- Black Cat - Baldorias S. Fanghini
- Black Clover - Jack the Ripper
- Blood-C: The Last Dark - Iori Matsuo
- Case Closed - Yaiba, Dr. Hasseleman, Masked Yaiba, Sammy Hammerstoltz, various additional voices
- Casshern Sins - Plug (Ep. 7)
- D.Gray-man - Daisya Barry
- Danganronpa: The Animation - Leon Kuwata
- The Day I Became a God - Ashura Kokuhō
- Desert Punk - Akio Kawaguchi
- Dragon Ball series - Raditz, Cell Jr., Dende, Evil Buu, Super Buu, Devilman, Lionel, Frouge, Planthorr, King Nikochan, Captain Dark, Tsukutsun Tsun, Shu (DB movie 3 only)
- Dragon Ball Super: Broly - Raditz
- Dragon Ball Super: Super Hero - Dende
- Dragon Ball Z: Battle of Gods - Dende
- Dragonaut - The Resonance - Ostrum
- Eden of the East - Ishii (Ep. 5)
- Evangelion 1.0: You Are (Not) Alone - Toji Suzuhara
- Evangelion: 2.0 You Can (Not) Advance - Tōji Suzuhara
- Fairy Tail - Totomaru
- Fruits Basket - Hatsuharu Sohma
- Fruits Basket (2019) - Hatsuharu Soma
- Fullmetal Alchemist - Russell Tringham
- Fullmetal Alchemist: Brotherhood - Neil
- Hell Girl - Mamoru Hanagasa (Ep. 3)
- High School DxD - The Towji (Ep. 7)
- ID: Invaded - Tamotsu Fukuda/Anaido
- Kamisama Kiss - Tasaki (Kurama's Manager, Ep. 11)
- Kiddy Grade - Cesario
- Kodocha - Mr. Ohki
- Lupin III: Island of Assassins - Jack
- Mass Effect: Paragon Lost - Brood
- Michiko and Hatchin - Rico (Ep. 4)
- My Bride is a Mermaid - Dynamite Ginji
- My Hero Academia - Eijiro Kirishima / Red Riot
- Oh! Edo Rocket - Knees
- Ōkami-san and her Seven Companions - Saruwatari (Eps. 5, 11)
- One Piece (Funimation dub) - Eustass Kid, Bellamy
- One Piece: Stampede - Eustass Kid
- Ouran High School Host Club - Gangster A
- Panty & Stocking with Garterbelt - Omori (Ep. 5B)
- Peach Girl - Juro
- Sgt. Frog - Karara's Father
- Shakugan no Shana - Marcosias (Seasons 2–3, movie)
- Shin-chan (Funimation dub) - Ham Solo
- Show by Rock!! - Strawberry Heart, Grateful King
- Speed Grapher - Yashiro
- That Time I Got Reincarnated As A Slime - Kaval
- Trinity Blood - Dietrich von Lohengrin
- We Without Wings - Daisuke Domon / Bunnie D
- YuYu Hakusho - Yusuke Urameshi, Seiryu, Kuro Momotaro, Puu

==== Video games ====
- BloodRayne 2 - Minions
- Borderlands: The Pre-Sequel - Lost Legion Infantry #2, Prankster Lost Legion Soldier
- Dragon Ball series - Raditz, Evil Buu, Super Buu, Cell Jr., Devilman, Dende (adult) (English dub)
- Spikeout: Battle Street - Additional voices
- Yu Yu Hakusho: Dark Tournament - Yusuke Urameshi (English dub)

=== Live action ===
- Adventures in Voice Acting - himself

=== Crew ===
==== Chief producer ====
- Dimension W

==== Line producer/producer ====
- Absolute Duo
- Akuma No Riddle
- Assassination Classroom
- Attack on Titan
- B Gata H Kei: Yamada's First Time
- Baki the Grappler
- Black Clover
- Burst Angel
- Case Closed
- Citrus
- Desert Punk
- Dragon Ball (series)
- Fairy Tail
- Freezing
- Fruits Basket
- Fullmetal Alchemist
- The Galaxy Railways
- Guilty Crown
- Gunslinger Girl
- Highschool DxD
- Kiddy Grade
- Kodocha
- Lupin III
- Michiko and Hatchin
- Mushi-Shi
- Nabari no Ou
- One Piece (Funimation dub)
- Panty and Stocking with Garterbelt
- Sakura Taisen: Ecole de Paris
- Samurai 7
- Serial Experiments Lain
- Soul Eater
- Spiral
- Trigun
- xxxHOLIC
- Yu Yu Hakusho

==== Associate producer ====
- Fire Force

==== ADR director ====
- Fruits Basket
- Kiddy Grade
- Strike Witches: The Movie
- Yu Yu Hakusho

==== ADR engineer ====
- Fruits Basket
- Kiddy Grade
