= Kitsune Kon =

Anime convention in Wisconsin, U.S.

Coordinates: 44°31′5″N 88°0′40″W

- Status: Active
- Genre: Anime, Gaming
- Venue: KI Convention Center
- Location: Green Bay, Wisconsin
- Country: United States
- Inaugurated: 2011
- Attendance: 3,487 in 2019
- Website: http://www.kitsunekon.com/

Kitsune Kon is an annual three-day anime convention held during July at the KI Convention Center in Green Bay, Wisconsin.

== Programming ==
The convention typically offers arcade gaming, artists' alley, a boffer (foam weapons) room, costume contest, dealers' hall, formal dance, and gaming (console, table top, video). Its formal dance benefited the American Association for Cancer prevention in 2016.

== History ==
Kitsune Kon moved to the KI Convention Center due to growth. Complaints about the 2017 convention included a lack of food options, shortage of staff, and issues with the local Green Bay population. Kitsune Kon 2020 was cancelled due to the COVID-19 pandemic. Kitsune Kon 2021 was also cancelled due to the COVID-19 pandemic.

=== Event history ===
Dates	Location	Atten.	Guests
February 25–27, 2011	Radisson Paper Valley Hotel; Appleton, Wisconsin	1,042	Chris Cason, Tiffany Grant, Page Kotalic, John Matson, Vic Mignogna, Yuko "Aido" Ota, and Ananth Panagariya.
March 30 – April 1, 2012	Radisson Paper Valley Hotel; Appleton, Wisconsin		Curtis Arnott, Colleen Clinkenbeard, Michelle Ann Dunphy, Steve "Warky" Nunez, Laura Post, and Lisle Wilkerson.
March 22–24, 2013	Radisson Paper Valley Hotel; Appleton, Wisconsin	1,795	Curtis Arnott, Bea Billany, Preston Cowley, Tanglwyst De Holloway, Scott Frerichs, Darrel Guilbeau, Nick Landis, Steve "Warky" Nunez, Laura Post, David Vincent, White Girl, and Lisle Wilkerson.
March 21–23, 2014	Radisson Paper Valley Hotel; Appleton, Wisconsin	2,210	Chris Cason, Tiffany Grant, Steve "Warky" Nunez, and Jan Scott-Frazier.
March 20–22, 2015	Hyatt on Main, Green Bay; Green Bay, Wisconsin	2,487	Richard Epcar, Faecakes, Natalie Rose Hoover, Joel McDonald, Andre "DJ Jinrei" Smith, and Ellyn Stern.
July 22–24, 2016	KI Convention Center; Green Bay, Wisconsin		Arc Impulse, Thomas M. Baxa, D.C. Douglas, Erin Fitzgerald, Quinton Flynn, Atelier Heidi, Joel McDonald, ProJared, Chris Rager and Jon St. John.
July 14–16, 2017	KI Convention Center; Green Bay, Wisconsin		Brian Beacock, Beau Billingslea, Steve Blum, Irene Flores, Colleen O'Shaughnessey, Derek Stephen Prince, Jon St. John, and Paul St. Peter.
July 20–22, 2018	KI Convention Center; Green Bay, Wisconsin	3,209	Kimberly Brooks, Mary Claypool, Les E. Claypool III, D.C. Douglas, Jessie James Grelle, Wendee Lee, Joel McDonald, Ian Sinclair, Paul St. Peter, and Bennett White.
July 12–14, 2019	KI Convention Center; Green Bay, Wisconsin	3,487	Tia Ballard, Justin Briner, Kira Buckland, Clifford Chapin, Xanthe Huynh, and Amanda Winn-Lee.
July 22–24, 2022	KI Convention Center; Green Bay, Wisconsin		Edward Bosco, John Burgmeier, Ben Diskin, Kohei Hattori, Phil Mizuno, Jonah Scott, and Jon St. John.
July 21–23, 2023	KI Convention Center; Green Bay, Wisconsin		Dani Chambers, Dorothy Fahn, Melissa Fahn, Tom Fahn, DJ GreenFlöw, Lisa Ortiz, and Michael "Knightmage" Wilson.
July 19–21, 2024	KI Convention Center; Green Bay, Wisconsin		Bryn Apprill, Samantha Béart, Dawn M. Bennett, Edward Bosco, Mark Hildreth, Bridget Hoffman, Brittney Karbowski, Brian Mathis, Scott McNeil, and Andre "DJ Jinrei" Smith.
July 11–13, 2025	KI Convention Center; Green Bay, Wisconsin		Jason "Liquid86" Bruner, Christine Marie Cabanos, Cynthia Cranz, Luke Gygax, Brittney Karbowski, Brittany Lauda, Mary Elizabeth McGlynn, Kristen McGuire, Wendy Powell, Tyson Rinehart, Lia Sargent, Scottaconda, and Linda Young.
July 10–12, 2026	KI Convention Center; Green Bay, Wisconsin		Morgan Berry, Justin Cook, Adam Gibbs, Damien Haas, David Matranga, Trina Nishimura, Michelle Ruff, Stephanie Sheh, Stardust Megu, Corinne Sudberg, and Christopher Wehkamp.
