= Queenstown Airport (disambiguation) =

Queenstown Airport (IATA: ZQN, ICAO: NZQN) is in Frankton, Otago, New Zealand.

Queenstown Airport may also refer to:

- Queenstown Airport (Tasmania) (IATA: UEE, ICAO: YQNS), also known as Howard's Plains aerodrome, a former airport west of Queenstown, Tasmania, Australia
- Queenstown Airport (South Africa) (IATA: UTW, ICAO: FAQT), an airport in South Africa
