= Yukina =

- Pronunciation: Yu-ki-na
- Gender: Female

Origin
- Origin: Japanese
- Meaning: Different meanings depending on the kanji used
- Region of origin: Japan

Yukina is a female Japanese given name.

== Written forms ==
Forms in kanji can include:

- 雪名, "snow, name"
- 雪菜, "snow, vegetable"
- 雪奈, "snow, endure"
- 幸奈, "fortune, endure"
- 希奈, "rare, endure"

== People ==
- Yukina Hayashi (林 有紀奈; born 1996), Japanese volleyball player
- Yukina Hirayama (born 1995), Japanese swimmer
- Yukina Kashiwa (柏幸奈, born 1994), Japanese actress and idol singer
- Yukina Kinoshita (木下 優樹菜, born 1987)
- Yukina Ota (太田 由希奈, born 1986), Japanese figure skater
- Yukina Shirakawa (白川ゆきな, born 1985), Japanese model
- Yukina Shuto (首藤 志奈), Japanese voice actress and singer
- Yukina Ueda (born 1998), Japanese long-distance runner
- Yukina Yahagi (矢作 有紀奈; born 1995), Japanese member of the idol group SKE48
- Yukina, lead vocalist for Japanese heavy metal music ensemble Hanabie.

== Fictional characters ==
- Yukina (YuYu Hakusho), a character in YuYu Hakusho media
- Yukina, a character in Kabaneri of the Iron Fortress
- Yukina Kiritani, as in Imocho
- Yukina Minato, a character in BanG Dream!
- Yukina Himeragi, a character in Strike the Blood
- Yukina Himuro, a character in Missions of Love
- Yukina Shirahane, a character in Kuromukuro
