= Queenstown station =

Queenstown station may refer to:

- Queenstown railway station in Queenstown, Tasmania, Australia
- Queenstown MRT station in Queenstown, Singapore
- Queenstown Road railway station in Battersea, London, England
