= Em Essex =

Canadian electronic musician

- Also known as: em; msx; Renard Queenston; Jackal Queenston; Mayhem; The Quick Brown Fox; Kitsune²; Rotteen; Emoticon; Furries in a Blender; Deuteronomy; Klippa; The Queenstons; NegaRen
- Genres: Breakcore; Chiptune; Speedcore
- Occupations: Musician; Video game developer
- Labels: LapFox Trax; Halley Labs; VULPvibe Records
- Website: msx.horse

Em Essex (also known as em, msx, Renard Queenston, and many other pseudonyms) is a Canadian electronic musician and video game developer. They (Note: Essex is agender and uses it/they personal pronouns. This article uses they/them for consistency.) have operated the netlabel LapFox Trax and the record label and studio Halley Labs.

Essex's aliases are represented by original characters, largely anthropomorphic animals, and correspond to different musical styles or genres. Their work includes breakcore, glitch, chiptune, happy hardcore, and speedcore. An active member of the furry fandom, Essex has performed as a DJ at Anthrocon.

"Rubber Band", which was released under the Jackal Queenston alias, became associated with the "penis music" Internet meme in 2019. Essex also created End of Starchild, a standalone game built with GZDoom and a sequel to Time Tripper (2021). The game combines first-person shooter and bullet hell mechanics and includes a separate role-playing game.
