= Hiei (YuYu Hakusho) =

Fictional character from YuYu Hakusho

- YuYu Hakusho character
- Hiei illustrated by Yoshihiro Togashi
- First appearance: YuYu Hakusho manga chapter 20: "The Deadly Trio!!"
- Created by: Yoshihiro Togashi
- Portrayed by: Shohei Hashimoto (play), Kanata Hongo (Netflix series)
- Voiced by: Nobuyuki Hiyama (Japanese); Chuck Huber (English, anime series); Kirk Thornton (English, first film); James Stanley (English, second film)

In-universe information
- Alias: Vincent (Filipino dub)

Hiei (Japanese: 飛影) is a fictional character in the manga series YuYu Hakusho by Yoshihiro Togashi. The sword-wielding fire demon Hiei is introduced as one of three wanted demons, alongside Kurama and Goki, who stole three treasures from the Underworld. Following his defeat by the forces Yusuke Urameshi and Kurama, Hiei becomes their ally as a payment to the superior Koenma. While Hiei remains as a supporting character across the series, it is not until the final story arc that his backstory is revealed, involving his relationship with his sister Yukina and whether or not he seeks revenge for being abandoned. The character also appeared in the manga's two animated movies that feature him facing new enemies.

Togashi was inspired by Skunky from Patalliro! when designing Hiei while his inclusion as a lead in the manga was done by popular demand. Hiei's Japanese voice provided by Nobuyuki Hiyama in the original anime. Hiei's English voice actors are Chuck Huber in the Funimation dub of the television series, Kirk Thornton, in the dub of YuYu Hakusho: The Movie, and James Stanley in the second movie, YuYu Hakusho: Poltergeist Report.

Hiei was highly popular in Japan, mainly within boys' love fans due to his close relationship with Kurama. Hiei has also inspired other authors resulting in the characters Sasuke Uchiha from Naruto and Levi Ackerman from Attack on Titan. Critical response to Hiei's character was generally positive due to his quiet personality and contrast with the other characters as well as his role in the final arc.

== Creation ==
YuYu Hakusho manga author Yoshihiro Togashi based Hiei and Killua Zoldyck onHunter × Hunter from the manga Patalliro! by Mineo Maya; Patalliro! was an influence on Togashi's work, as he read it and other yaoi works while working to write shōnen manga. Togashi based Hiei's design off of the character Skunky from the series. He contiguously developed the names of the main characters by skimming through a dictionary and taking out kanji characters he found appealing. "Yusuke Urameshi" is a pun, "Kazuma Kuwabara" is a combination of two professional baseball players, and "Hiei" and "Kurama" are "just names that popped into [Togashi's] head." Although Kurama and Hiei were introduced as enemies that Yusuke Urameshi had to fight, Togashi planned from the beginning to turn Kurama into a supporting character afterward with Hiei also joining him due to positive response to the cast. Though Kurama and Hiei would go improve the series' popularity, the editors from Weekly Shonen Jump still saw Yusuke as another reason for the series' success.

When he introduced Hiei and Kurama, the author had early plans to make Kurama a main character but was not certain about Hiei. For the Four Holy Beasts story arc, Togashi made four enemies on impulse, but the only humans were Yusuke and Kuwabara. When it became clear that they were not strong enough to take on two demons each, Hiei and Kurama appeared on the scene, making their introductions as protagonists. Togashi's editor was the one who suggested the manga author to keep using Hiei in the rest of the series. When fighting, Togashi wanted Hiei's fights to be always fast to the point some end in a few pages. He also wanted his personality to remain that of a meansprited child. While Hiei remains as Mukuro's assistant in the series' final arc, Togashi initially considered the two to be a couple.

=== Casting ===
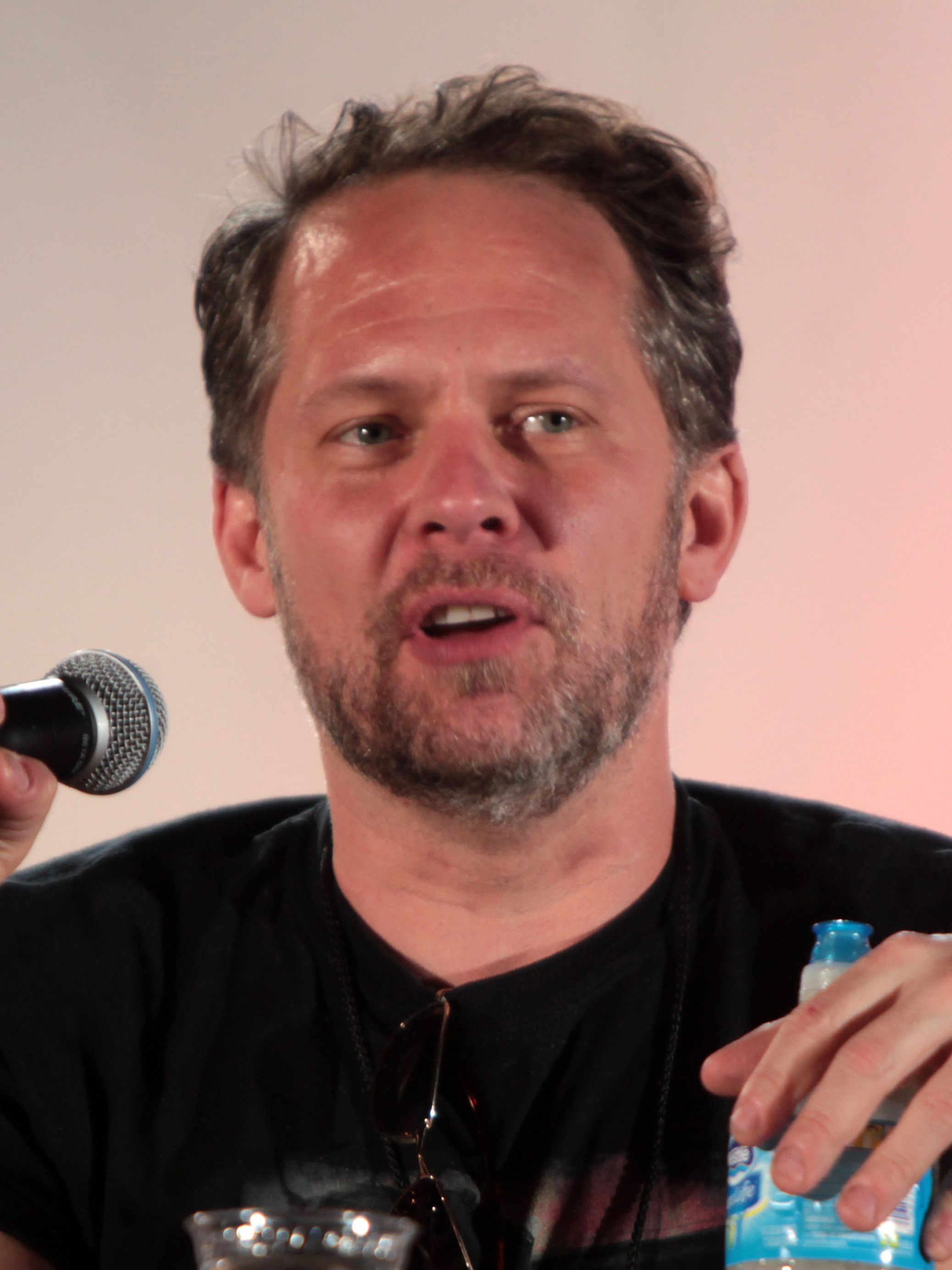
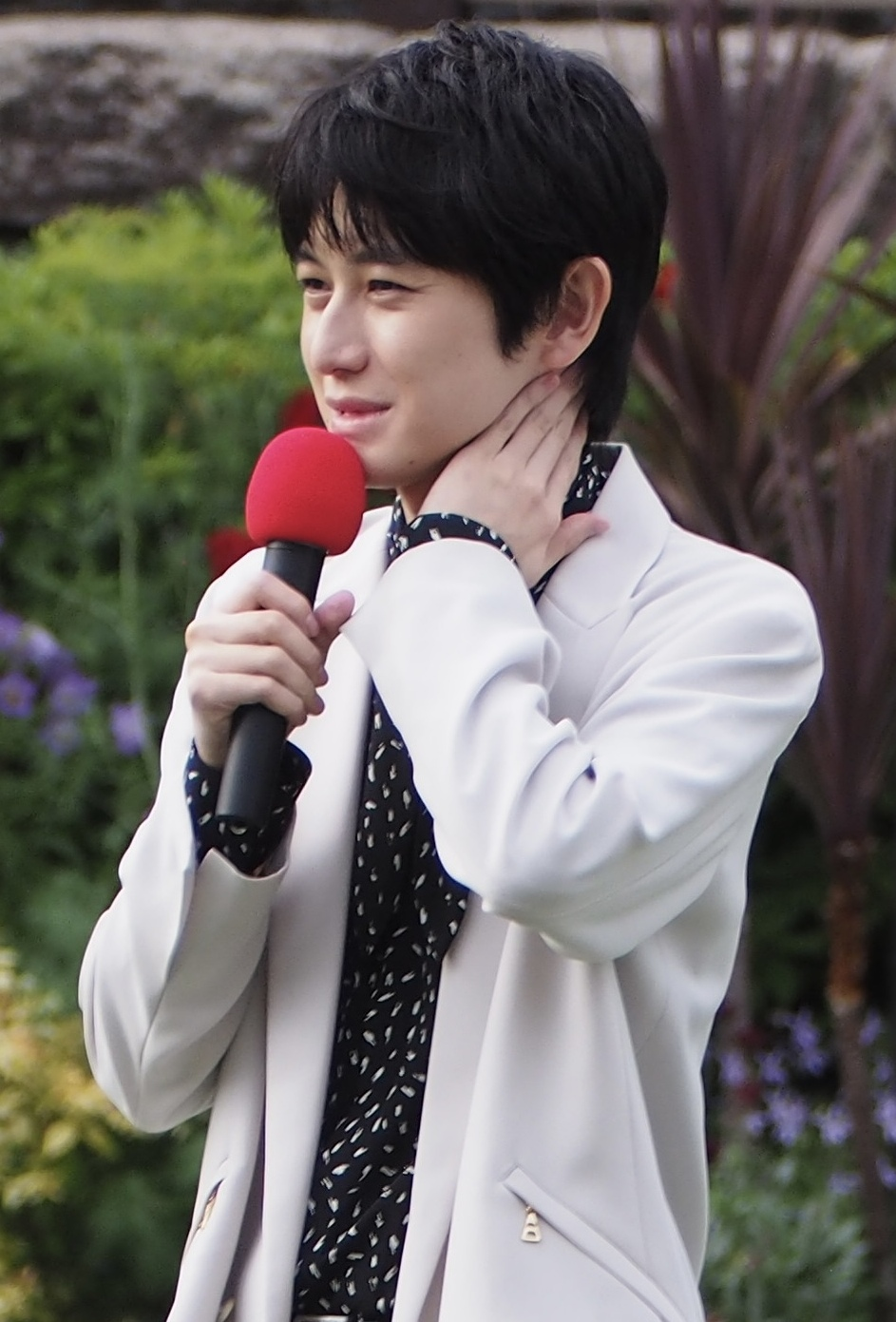
Chuck Huber (left) has voiced him in the English dub while Kanata Hongo portrayed Hiei in the live-action.

The anime staff liked the contrasting colors the protagonists have, linking them to popular tokusatsu series. When animating the manga series, there was talk of casting either Hiei or Kurama as a female cast member, and the station producer said it would be Kurama due to his Kurama having androgynous, naive-looking looks. As a result, Hiei was voiced by Nobuyuki Hiyama. Hiyama initially gave Hiei an intimidating aura in order to give Yusuke fear. As a result, Hiyama was surprised when Hiei became a supporting character. When talking about the character, Hiyama says Hiei is constantly moody and is balanced with the notable power he exposes. Due to this cold portrayal the character has, Hiyama noticed there was a massive change when his sister Yukina was introduced, and Hiei is bothered by how Yusuke and Kurama casually mock this state of weakness. In response to positive response to the handling of the leads, Hiyama said that Hiei and Kurama might also become enemies in future episodes.

Chuck Huber voiced Hiei in the Funimation dub of the series, talking a liking to the techniques Hiei uses in battles and had no idea there was a major fandom behind it. When going to a convention, Huber was surprised by Hiei's popularity as he could not believe several people wanted to sign him autographs related to the series enough to request breaks. Kirk Thornton also voices him in the dub of YuYu Hakusho: The Movie, and James Stanley in the second movie, YuYu Hakusho: Poltergeist Report.

Hiei is called Vincent in the Philippine version of the anime, which is titled Ghost Fighter.

For the official play of the series, Shohei Hashimoto plays Hiei. The actor was a fan of the anime as a child and was surprised that he would portray Hiei; he considers the reason for the character's popularity is being a tsundere archetype and being always performing cool feats. He further enjoyed performing Hiei's techniques which he considers help expanding more the cool aura the character presents. Kanata Hongō portrays Hiei in the live-action Netflix series. He mentions taking a liking to his skills in battle calling his lines fitting for a young male. However, he considered his character would not be able to defeat Young Toguro.

== Appearances ==
=== In YuYu Hakusho ===
Hiei is introduced in YuYu Hakusho as one of three wanted demons, alongside Kurama and Goki, who stole three treasures from the Underworld. With the Conjuring Blade (降魔の剣, Kōma no Ken), a sword that turns anyone cut by it into a demon, he plans to create an army.^{[ch. 22]} As the last of his partners on the run, Hiei kidnaps Keiko in an exchange with Yusuke for the other two treasures. However, he also cuts her with the Conjuring Blade, forcing Yusuke to defeat him to save her, which he does with help from Kurama and Botan.^{[ch. 23]} Hiei possesses the Evil Eye (邪眼, Jagan; referred to as the "Jagan Eye" in the English anime) implanted in his forehead, which gives him clairvoyance and allows him to control lesser demons and humans with only a glance.^{[ch. 22]} He can transform into a form with Evil Eyes all over his body, boosting his powers. While assisting Yusuke in defeating The Four Beasts in exchange for a reduced sentence, Hiei changes and no longer acts solely for his own interest.^{[ch. 38]} For associating with humans, Hiei and Kurama are invited to take part in the Dark Tournament on Yusuke and Kuwabara's team.^{[ch. 51]} During the Dark Tournament, he debuts the technique known as the Black Dragon Unholy Fire (邪王炎殺黒龍波, Jaō Ensatsu Kokuryūha; lit. "Tyrant King's Blaze-Murdering Black Dragon Wave", "Dragon of the Darkness Flame" in the English anime), which allows him to summon and control black flames from the Demon Plane.^{[ch. 57]} He eventually masters the technique by consuming the flames, which greatly enhances the user's abilities.^{[ch. 100]} Although he initially refrains from helping Yusuke and company stop Shinobu Sensui from opening the portal to the Demon Plane because he wants to return himself, Hiei later joins them when Yusuke offers to let him have The Black Chapter videotape.^{[ch. 133]} After watching Yusuke's death by Sensui, Hiei's old demon powers awaken.^{[ch. 147]}

Following Sensui's death, Hiei goes to the Demon World where his backstory is explored when meeting Mukuro's while meeting the man who gave him his third eye to become Mukuro's 2nd best soldier.^{[ch. 158]} Hiei is later revealed that he is a fire demon born to a race of female Ice Maidens, who reproduce by parthenogenesis every 100 years, always giving birth to a female. However, a male child is born only if the Maiden has had sexual contact with a male, which is forbidden in their society. As her children were born, their mother wept two Tears of Ice before dying, tears that crystallize into jewels and are given to the babies.^{[ch. 160]} Hiei was thrown from the floating glacial country to his supposed doom, but managed to survive and grew up in the wilderness, where he developed a thirst for killing. The only times he found peace were while looking at his Tear of Ice jewel, later deciding to find the glacial country to take revenge on the women who cast him out.^{[ch. 161]} Having lost his jewel during a battle, Hiei went to Shigure and had an Evil Eye implanted so he could find it and the glacial country, at the cost of losing his powers. Though he easily found the Ice Maidens' home, his lust for revenge fades; he can not find his jewel and sets out to find his sister instead.^{[ch. 161]} He takes part in the Demon Plane Unification Tournament, losing to Mukuro in the third round. At the end of the series, he is assigned to the special squad in charge of safely returning humans who wander into the Demon Plane.^{[ch. 173]}

=== In other media ===
Hiei also appears in Yu Yu Hakusho: The Movie (1993) on a mission to rescue Koenma who was taken by the demons Koashura and Garuga. The second film, Yu Yu Hakusho the Movie: Poltergeist Report (1994), he battles the Netherworld's forces. The OVAs Eizoken feature very short clips that take place after the end of the series. They also contain video montages from the anime and satirical animated shorts focusing on the four protagonists. Two other OVAs detailing his first meeting with Kurama as well as his return to the Human World after the finale were also released.

Hiei is also playable in multiple video games based on the series such asYū Yū Hakusho Makyō Tōitsusen and Yu Yu Hakusho: Dark Tournament. Yu Yu Hakusho characters were also featured in the Weekly Shōnen Jump crossover fighting games J-Stars Victory VS and Jump Force.

== Reception ==
Hiei is a popular character with fans, coming in first place in the series' first two popularity polls. He also came in first in the American Shonen Jump poll. He was ranked as the first, then second, then third most popular male anime character in Animage's Anime Grand Prix for the consecutive years of 1993, 1994, and 1995. The Japanese publication Newtype ranked him as the fifth best male anime character of the 1990s.

The character was often the subject of analysis by scholars. In "A diversidade homoafetiva nos quadrinhos japoneses: educação sexual, pornografia ou mercado erótico?" Hiei and Kurama are described as popular characters within dojinshi despite there being a relationship between these two in the original work. Time agreed, seeing both Hiei and Kurama as the most attractive characters from the series within the female readers. In "No Boundaries? Girls’ Interactive, Online Learning About Femininities" Hiei is depicted as a deep character within gaming, with the article claiming several female characters in similar works are not that given that level of depth. In analyzing the series, Pablo Rodrigo Santoni said in "Animês e mangás : a identidade dos adolescentes" that Hiei and the rest of the YuYu Hakusho leads are common subjects who are involve in violence to appeal to the young demography from the Weekly Shonen Jump and thus are portrayed as young teenagers continuously involve not fighting monsters but also each other. This case of violence was noted by Santoni that might concern parents in regards to how their children are entertained by the series' violence. Masashi Kishimoto regarded him as a cool villain who still remains a strong aura when appearing in the series. He also said that he used Hiei as a reference when creating Sasuke Uchiha from Naruto and his Sharingan technique. Levi Ackerman from Attack on Titan was one of the characters influenced by Hiei when Hajime Isayama wrote the manga, deeming his design as something that boys' love fans would like.

When it comes to critical response, THEM Anime Reviews saw Hiei as the series' best character to the point of overshadowing Yusuke whom he saw less likable; "Hiei is revealed to be much more complex and warm an individual than his humble beginnings in this series imply". He also found his constant batnering with Kuwabara hilarious in general. Animerica's Justin Kovalsky in general saw Hiei, Kurama and Kuwabara as strong supporting characters that help the series make cooler×. In "Yu Yu Hakusho: Does it Hold Up?", Anime News Network saw the final arc an important story arc to explore Hiei's backtory alongside Yusuke's and Kurama's despite fans dislking the way it ended. In retrospect, DVD Talk agreed with the comments about the final arc which allows to see Hiei's character more properly. Fandom Post liked the balance that both Kurama and Hiei's sidestories bring to Yusuke's in the final arc but felt they were overshadowed by Hiei's side as the series had not properly explored his backstory before. FOr Netflix's live-action series, Anime News Network saw Hiei as one of the worst treated characters being adapted due to his lack of screentime as well as fight scenes. IGN's Juan Barquin said the live-action falters when it comes to the supporting characters due to the pacing required of a five-episode series in contrast to Yusuke and Kuwabara. AnimeFeminist had mixed feelings about Hiei and Mukuro's fight in the last episodes as the apparent romantic relationship the two appear to start sharing rob most of the latter's power when defeating the former, a common issue the writer found in the series involving female characters.
