= Yusuke Urameshi =

Fictional character from YuYu Hakusho

- YuYu Hakusho character
- Yusuke illustrated by Yoshihiro Togashi
- First appearance: YuYu Hakusho Chapter 1: "Goodbye, Material World!" December 3, 1990
- Created by: Yoshihiro Togashi
- Portrayed by: Tsubasa Sakiyama (stage play), Takumi Kitamura (Netflix series)
- Voiced by: Nozomu Sasaki (Japanese); Justin Cook (English, anime series); Jonathan Fahn (English, first movie); Rik Nagel (English, second movie)

Yusuke Urameshi (Japanese: 浦飯幽助, Hepburn: Urameshi Yūsuke) is a fictional character and the main protagonist of the manga and anime series YuYu Hakusho, created by Yoshihiro Togashi. Yusuke is a junior high school delinquent who dies while saving a child from a car accident. After seeing the grief his friends suffer following his death, Yusuke's soul works for the Underworld's detective of paranormal events in the Human World, eventually reviving in the process. He begins his work in the Human World but ends up traveling to the Underworld and then eventually to the Demon World. In each case he undertakes, Yusuke meets several new enemies and allies. He forms multiple alliances across his journey while developing supernatural abilities due to harnessing their Reiki, one's own aura or life energy.

Yusuke was created by Togashi under the concept of a complex individual who goes from slice-of-life stories to action scenes. For the latter, Yusuke was given new allies, which both Togashi and the editors from the manga magazine noted helped to improve the series's popularity. He has been voiced by Nozomu Sasaki in Japanese. In the English dubs, Justin Cook, Jonathan Fahn, and Rik Nagel voice the character. He is called Eugene in the Philippine version of the anime. When adapting to anime, director Noriyuki Abe drew parallels with his design to both yankī delinquents and tokusatsu figures, due to the multiple colors the leads have. Takumi Kitamura portrayed him in the live-action mini-series, aiming to give him a more modern take, finding delinquent figures dated.

Critical response to Yusuke's character has been positive due to his character arc from a delinquent to a more caring figure, with praise also being given to how he handles enemies. Special attention was given to his arc in the series's finale. The character's popularity led him to appear in polls of both the series and anime in general. The performances of both Cook and Kitamura were also the subject of praise by the media.

== Creation ==
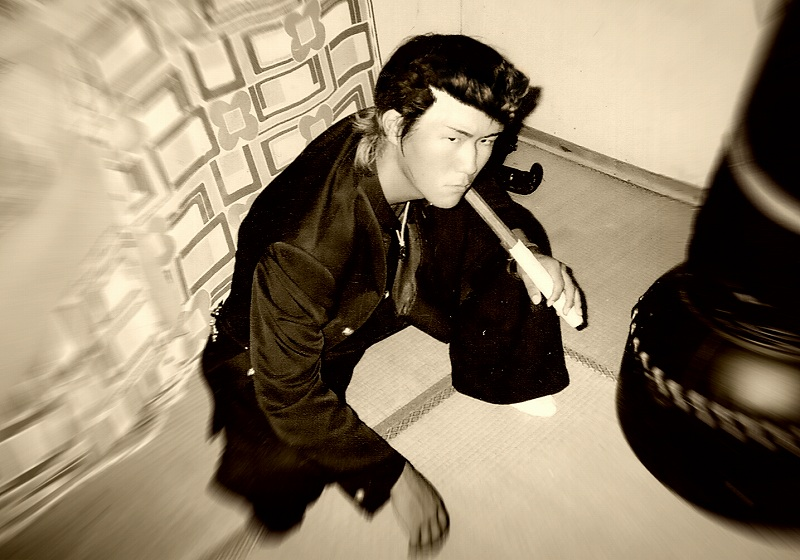
A man dressed as a 1990s Japanese yankī (2015)

YuYu Hakusho manga author Yoshihiro Togashi created Yusuke Urameshi. With regard to the main protagonist, Togashi claimed the personality must be clearly defined from the beginning before the comrades could be added, so it is more difficult. This was mostly due to the author's desire to create antagonists who might stand out more than Yusuke. Nevertheless, he believes that after YuYu Hakusho he became unable to write like this. In contrast to Yusuke, Togashi would write the protagonist Gon Freecss in Hunter × Hunter with the concept of a more simplified character due to the series's length. Togashi did not give much thought to the names of the characters. He came up with them by skimming through a dictionary and combining kanji characters he found appealing. The author said the name Yusuke Urameshi is "practically a joke." Viz Media explained that the "Yu" is written with the kanji for "ghost", and "Urameshiii..." is a phrase typically said by wailing ghosts.

The manga's shift from occult detective fiction to the martial arts genre after Yusuke's death and revival in the early chapters was planned by Togashi from the beginning. He took this idea from the series Kinnikuman, which began largely as a comedy before concentrating more on action. For the Four Holy Beasts story arc, Togashi made four enemies "on impulse", but the only humans were Yusuke and Kazuma Kuwabara. When it became clear that they were not strong enough to take on two demons each, Hiei and Kurama appeared on the scene, making their introductions as protagonists. In further enhancing Yusuke's role as a fighter, Togashi created the elder martial artist Genkai, who would act as his mentor, which he considered to be a common pattern in storytelling. He further developed this throughout a competition where Yusuke would be given the rights to become Genkai's student by defeating a demon in the same moment.

Though Kurama and Hiei would go on to improve the series's popularity, the editors from Weekly Shonen Jump still saw Yusuke as another reason for the series's success. Togashi intended to establish the main characters and familiarize the reader with them before placing them in tense, physical conflicts. Early examples of Togashi's problems with drawing the series involved Yusuke's first fight in the Dark Tournament arc against Chu when the series was almost canceled. There were many instances where he would create nearly entire manuscripts by himself, such as Yusuke's meeting with demon predecessor Raizen and the battle between Kurama and Karasu. Togashi expressed problems when drawing the final fight between Yusuke and former detective Shinobu Sensui due to his decaying health.

When animating the manga series, director Noriyuki Abe took notes from Togashi's illustrations; he found Yusuke and Kuwabara having opposite school uniforms despite being from the same school weird. He asked the editorial for the manga and they found it suitable. The visual helped to make Yusuke and Kuwabara look like the yankī delinquent stereotype seen in other works. When Kurama and Hiei joined the main cast, the anime staff liked the contrasting colors the protagonists have, linking them to popular tokusatsu series. The team also decided to tone down the appearances of Yusuke's mother when it came to seeing her son fight. For the ending, they ended up shaping the end according to the manga while interspersing an original screenplay, summarizing it in a structure in which Yusuke returned after a few years, in contrast to the manga, where he immediately returns alongside Kurama.

=== Casting ===
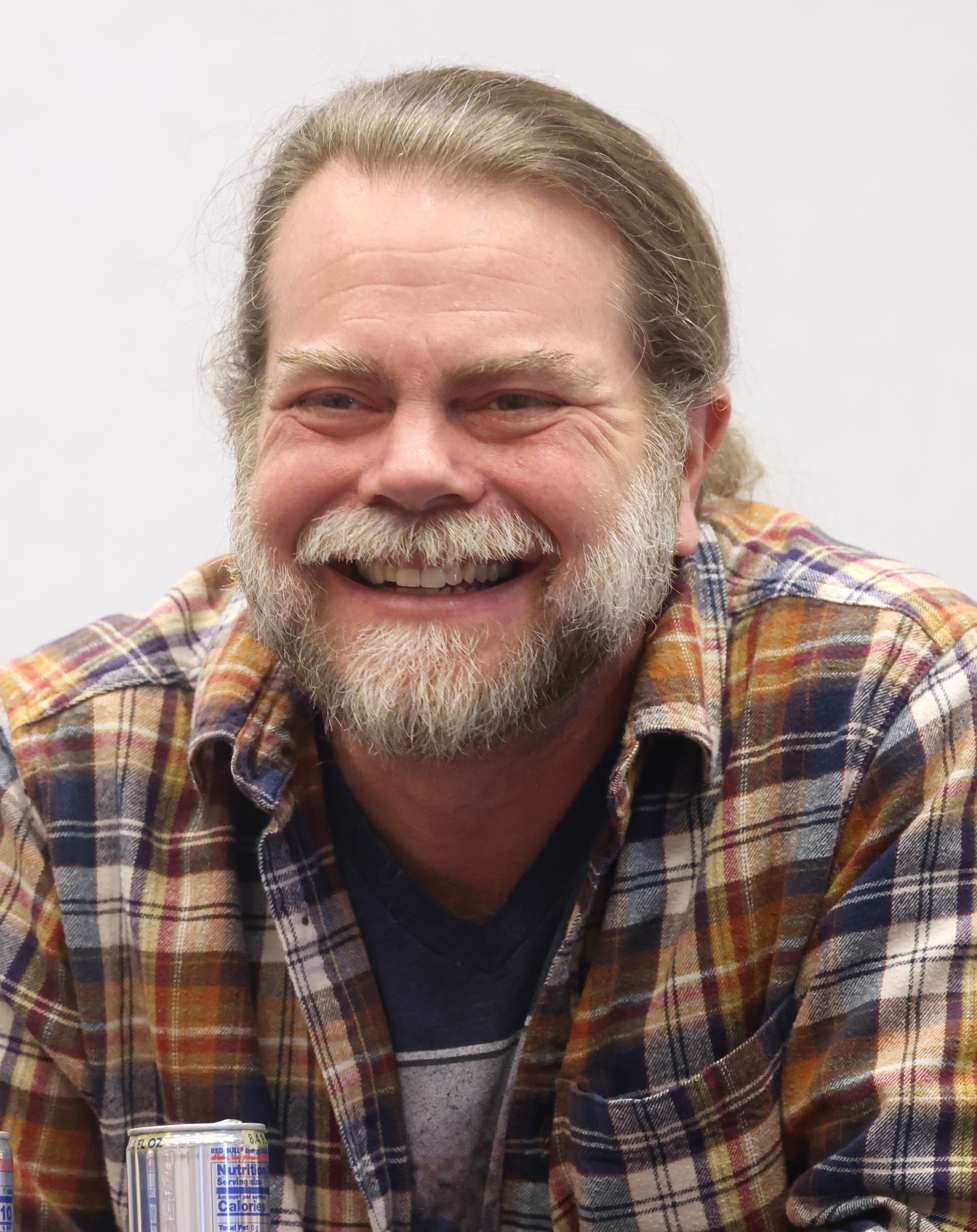
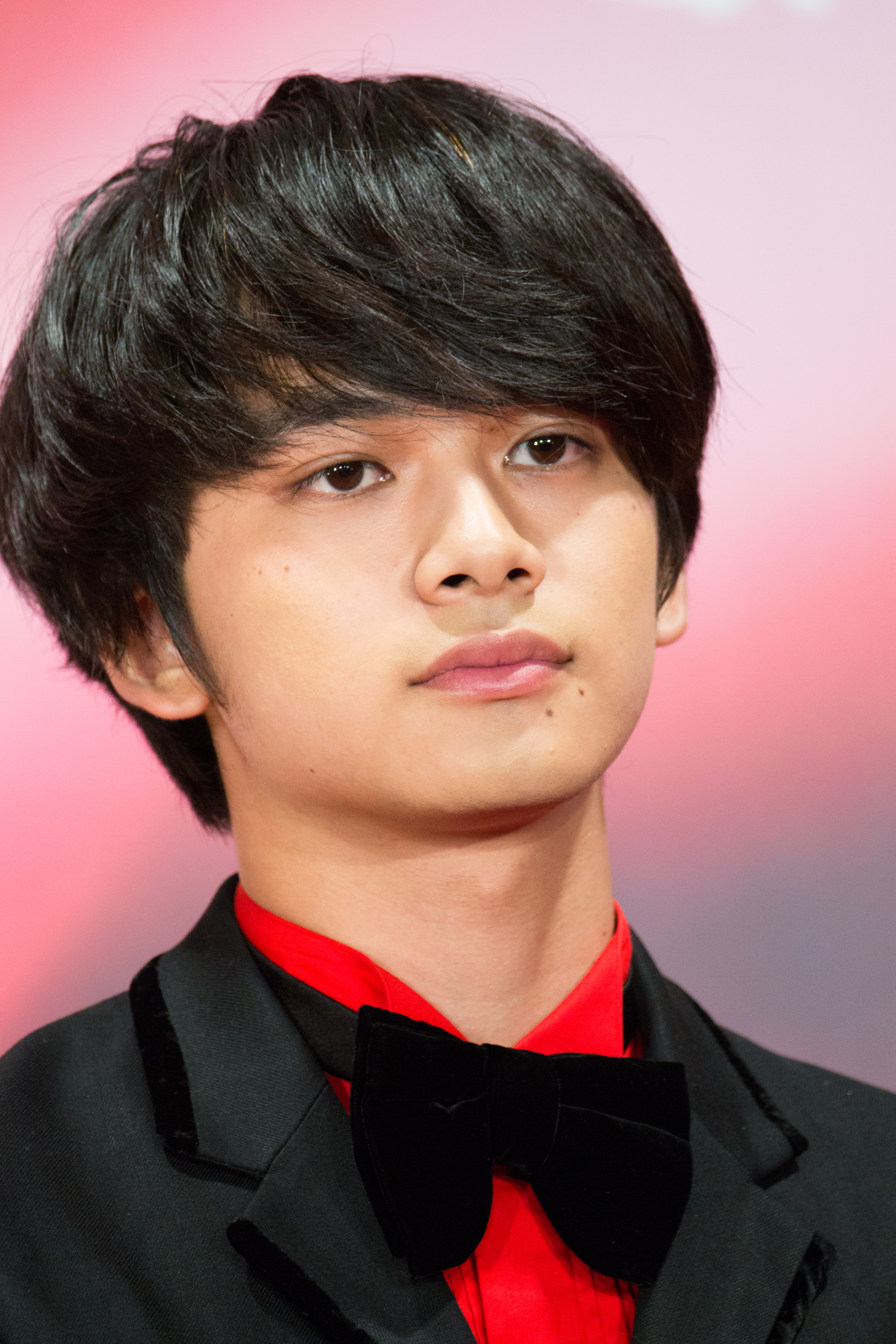
Justin Cook (left) voiced Yusuke in the Funimation dubs of the series, while Takumi Kitamura portrayed Yusuke in the live-action series.

Yusuke is voiced by Nozomu Sasaki in Japanese. His performance appealed to Togashi due to how he developed his identity. Before the anime adaptation of YuYu Hakusho started, Sasaki had been a fan of the series and wanted to do the role of the lead thanks to how Togashi drew him. He also liked the personality Yusuke is given, as he always says what is in his mind, enough to admire him. As a result, he considers the character as a fitting leader, considering he always attracts other characters and makes good chemistry with comrade Kurama, who he noted was appealing in his own way. Nevertheless, Sasaki said that voicing Yusuke is challenging, as he is constantly yelling in most of his scenes. Sasaki and fellow voice actor Yuri Amano debuted in the same period, which made them befriend each other when they worked together, which they also found hilarious since their characters, Yusuke and Keiko, are in love. Nevertheless, Sasaki also found the scene where Toguro kills Genkai sad, to the point it affected the mood of the voice actors the day that episode was recorded. He also found Toguro as a menacing figure, especially when hearing recordings of Tessho Genda.

For the English dub, Justin Cook voices Yusuke in the television series and first film in the Funimation dubs. Cook was a fan of YuYu Hakusho before being given the role of the protagonist, who he always cared about. Originally, he was not being cast for the role but was just the voice director instead. The producers had a hard time deciding who would voice the lead until one of them found Cook to be suitable for the role, which excited the actor. He considered Yusuke unique thanks to his friendly side despite being a delinquent, which allows him to relate to the audiences. Cook enjoyed Yusuke's characterization as a caring teenager with several friends despite initially being seen as a delinquent. He especially enjoyed Yusuke and Keiko's interactions in the anime. Besides Cook, other actors have voiced Yusuke in other works: Darren Pleavin did it for the Animax Asia dub of the television series, Rik Nagel voiced him in the second film by the Central Park Media dub, and Jonathan Fahn took the role for the first film and the Anime Works dub as "Jonathan Charles".

In the stage play of the series, Yusuke was portrayed by Tsubasa Sakiyama. Before this work, Sakiyama mostly played quiet characters, and Yusuke stood out due to his delinquent attitude and cool mannerisms, which he studied on YouTube. For the Netflix live-action series, Takumi Kitamura portrays Yusuke. Kitamura said he studied and took aspects from both the manga and anime, such as the way Yusuke walks and how much of a stride he has. He remarked how a delinquent character like Yusuke could come off as outdated, so he had to put some "modern twists" on the character. Kitamura also noted how there is a slight age difference from the original, as Yusuke is aged up from a junior high school student to a high school senior.

== Appearances ==
=== In YuYu Hakusho ===
Yusuke Urameshi is a fourteen-year-old delinquent who attends Sarayashiki Junior High School. Yusuke bears affection for his childhood friend Keiko Yukimura, who initially takes a role as Yusuke's conscience, making sure he comes to class and behaves, and later becomes his romantic interest. Yusuke's alcoholic mother, Atsuko, raised him as a single parent after conceiving him as a young teen. His poor school attendance, constant fighting, and bad habits have earned him the fear of his classmates and the disdain of his teachers and neighbors.^{[ch. 1]} This all changes when Yusuke is struck and killed by a car while saving a small child who has wandered into the road. The Underworld ("Spirit World" in the English anime) has him permitted to return to his body and resume his life.^{[ch. 1]} However, while doing so, it is revealed that Yusuke has a particularly strong aura, or spirit energy, and Underworld head Koenma recruits him as an Underworld Detective. Yusuke is charged with investigating supernatural phenomena in the Human World that have connections to the Underworld.^{[ch. 18]}

Upon having him revived, Koenma teaches Yusuke the Reigun (霊丸, Reigan; lit. "Spirit Sphere", "Spirit Gun" in the English anime), an aura energy blast fired as a projectile out of his right index finger as though his hand were a gun and his finger the barrel, effective against demons.^{[ch. 18]} At first, he is only able to muster a single shot per day, but after training under the martial artist Genkai, he can fire multiple shots per day, as well as develop minor variations on the technique, such as the "shotgun" variant wherein Yusuke fires a spray of miniature spirit guns at once using his fist instead of his finger. Yusuke's case sends him on a rescue mission, where he meets Toguro, a human turned into a demon. To test his strength, Toguro invites Yusuke to the Dark Tournament, an event put on by corrupt, rich humans in which teams of demons, and occasionally humans, fight fierce battles for the chance to receive any wish they desire. Team Urameshi, consisting of Yusuke, Kuwabara, Kurama, Hiei, and a disguised Genkai, traverses through the strenuous early rounds to face Team Toguro in the finals and win the tournament.^{[ch. 51]}

Following the tournament, it is disclosed that Shinobu Sensui, Yusuke's predecessor as Underworld Detective, has recruited six other powerful beings to help him take over where Sakyo left off, opening a hole to the Demon World to cause genocide of the human race. After he is killed by Sensui, it is revealed that Yusuke is a mazoku; a demon mated with a human ancestor of his 44 generations ago, but the gene remained quiescent for generations.^{[ch. 149]} Yusuke is resurrected by his demonic powers, which, when fully awakened, cause his hair to grow to his knees and tattoo-like marks to appear on his body, which leads to Sensui's defeat in the rematch.^{[ch. 152]} Yusuke learns he is a descendant of the demon king Raizen, whom he goes to see in the Demon World following his failed marriage proposal to Keiko. After training and seeing Raizen dying due to refusing to eat humans, Yusuke becomes king of his domain but proposes the Demon World Unification Tournament, with the winner taking control of the whole Demon World.^{[ch. 165]} However, Yusuke is defeated by Demon King Yomi, who would be defeated by one of Raizen's former allies, Enki, causing Yusuke to leave the Demon World. At the end of the series, Yusuke opens up a ramen stand and also spends time helping humans and demons cooperate, but still has problems with Keiko for not keeping his marriage promise.^{[ch. 172]}

=== In other media ===
Yusuke also appears in Yu Yu Hakusho: The Movie on a mission to rescue Koenma, who was taken by the demons Koashura and Garuga. In the second film, Yu Yu Hakusho the Movie: Poltergeist Report, Yusuke battles the Netherworld's forces, specifically the antagonist Yakumo. The OVAs Eizoken feature very short clips that take place after the end of the series. They also contain video montages from the anime and satirical animated shorts focusing on the four protagonists. An OVA based on the terrorist arc against Underworld was also released.

The character is also playable in multiple video games, including Yu Yu Hakusho Makyō Tōitsusen, Yu Yu Hakusho: Dark Tournament, and Yu Yu Hakusho: Tournament Tactics. He is also playable in the crossover games Jump Super Stars, Jump Ultimate Stars, J-Stars Victory VS, and Jump Force.

== Reception ==
=== Cultural impact ===
Yusuke is a popular character with fans, coming in second and third place in the series's first two popularity polls. He came in third in the American Shonen Jump poll. In the Japanese magazine Animage's Anime Grand Prix popularity poll, Yusuke was ranked as the thirteenth most popular anime character in 1993, the tenth in 1994, and the eighth in 1995. In March 2010, Yusuke was ranked the sixteenth best male anime character of the 1990s by the Japanese magazine Newtype. While analyzing the protagonist in "Yankee and Bosozoku", Lara Maria Almeida Ferreira noted that Yusuke's character appears to be a stereotype of school delinquents often seen in Japan, especially in Bakuon Rettou, Crows, and Hot Road. The violence Yusuke is involved with was also analyzed in "Um estudo sobre a violência em duas histórias gráficas" by Leconte de Lisle Coelho Junior, citing parallels with characters from Fushigi Yugi, which is aimed towards female readers, while YuYu Hakusho is aimed towards a male demographic. Yusuke's introduction is also noted to be similar to Chinese myths. In the book A Gathering of Spirits, Patrick Dranzen says one of the early one-shot stories Yusuke is involved in helps to tell the reader that death comes to everybody and that dogs also deserve to rest in peace when Yusuke helps a dog come to the afterlife while confronting its owner. According to manga author Nobuhiro Watsuki, Yusuke has a surprisingly dark story in YuYu Hakusho in contrast to the more lighthearted stories from Dragon Ball and Slam Dunk; this made YuYu Hakusho stand out in the 1990s. In contrast to Yusuke, Watsuki wrote the Rurouni Kenshin protagonist, Himura Kenshin, as an adult with a dark past based on the Edo period to make the series stand out. Nevertheless, the manga managed to compete well against other Weekly Shonen Jump manga from the 1990s, including Dragon Ball and YuYu Hakusho. Few series portrayed adults as leads, with other exceptions such as the protagonist from City Hunter.

=== Critical response ===
Critics praised Yusuke's portrayal as a delinquent who tries to become a better person. Animerica's considers Yusuke a "bad character" in the series's beginning due to his delinquent acts and considers his missions under Koenma's guide as potentially to avoid a karmic action, as seen through his egg that represents his morals, and sees his transformation into a Spirit Detective as an appealing hero. Polley, a staff reviewer of Manga Life, praised Yusuke's battle with Suzaku, the leader of the Four Beasts, which he found engaging. Joseph Luster of Otaku USA says that while Yusuke and the cast mature across the story, their core personality traits remain the same in the process, citing Yusuke as a "stubborn and recklessly emotional" character and also praising Justin Cook's work. In "Yu Yu Hakusho: Does it Hold Up?", Anime News Network praised the way Yusuke sees himself in the series's beginning and how the feelings of his close people make him search for another attempt at life. Anime News Network acclaimed Yusuke as one of the best protagonists in Shonen Jump history as a result of both his maturity and fights; his "eagerness to turn any opponent into his personal punching bag gives him a slightly angrier edge than is typical for Jump protagonists, and he rarely seems motivated by a search for justice or anything nobler than simply wanting to beat someone's face in". On a more negative view, THEM Anime Reviews was disappointed that Yusuke's romantic relationship with Keiko was not developed and believed Hiei's character often overshadows Yusuke. AnimeFeminist criticized Yusuke's perversion towards Keiko. However, the website praised the writing involving Yusuke's relationship with Genkai, as the male fighter follows the elder's teachings to become wise like her and defeat the antagonistic Young Toguro, who was involved with the mentor before the series's beginning.

There was also commentary about Yusuke's origins in his fight against Sensui and the next and final arc. Screen Rant said that while Yusuke was always a strong fighter, the revelation of his mazoku energy and its usage against Sensui made him one of the most overpowered fighters in manga, considering how easily he kills Sensui when awakening his new powers. In retrospect, DVD Talk liked how Raizen's existence helps to explain the amount of strength Yusuke tends to show since the series's beginning. Fandom Post liked the balance that both Kurama and Hiei's sidestories bring to Yusuke's in the final arc but felt they were overshadowed by Hiei's side, as the series had not properly explored his backstory before. He regarded the final fight between Yusuke and Sensui and the large aftermath that forces Yusuke to come into conflict with the Demons again as "epic". Anime News Network believes that while the first arc reinforces Yusuke's masculinity, the final arc instead makes him more mature, as regardless of the training he has, the protagonist is still a weak warrior in front of the new demons he faces. Besides Genkai, Anime Feminist praised how in the final arc, Yusuke finds proper role models in the form of Raizen and Kuroko Sanada, which allows him to make peace with his current strength rather than follow Toguro's path.

For the live-action series, IGN's Juan Barquin praised the "excellent characterization of its core duo [of Yusuke and Kuwabara]". Tokyo Weekender's Cezary Jan Strusiewicz said that "when you pair that with a character shooting demons with his magical finger gun, the effect is comical in all the wrong ways". Ash Parrish of The Verge praised the performances of Kitamura as well as the well-choreographed action sequences.
