= Kurama (YuYu Hakusho) =

Fictional character from YuYu Hakusho

- YuYu Hakusho character
- Kurama as illustrated by Yoshihiro Togashi featuring the human form (below) and the demon form (above)
- First appearance: YuYu Hakusho manga chapter 20: "The Deadly Trio!!"
- Created by: Yoshihiro Togashi
- Portrayed by: Hiroki Suzuki (stage play), Jun Shison (Netflix series)
- Voiced by: Japanese: Megumi Ogata (human); Shigeru Nakahara (demon); English: John Burgmeier (Funimation dub); Candice Moore (Animax Asia dub); Chris Orbach (Central Park Media dub); David Hayter (Anime Works dub)

In-universe information
- Alias: Shuichi Minamino (human name)
- Family: List: Unnamed father (deceased); Shiori Hatanaka (mother); Kazuya Hatanaka (stepfather); Shuichi Hatanaka (stepbrother)

Kurama (Japanese: 蔵(くら)馬(ま); /ˈkuːrɑːmɑː/ KOO-rah-mah) is a fictional character from the manga YuYu Hakusho by Yoshihiro Togashi. A Fox Demon (妖狐, Yōko) reborn as the human Shuichi Minamino (南野 秀一, Minamino Shūichi) in modern life,^{[ch. 21]} he is introduced as a thief who stole a supernatural mirror to save his sick mother from death. Although Kurama is initially portrayed as a villain, he becomes a supporting character to aid the protagonist Yusuke Urameshi in the next arc. Across his fights, events from his past life as a demon are revealed. During one encounter, he is involuntarily reverted to his demon form, and he later gains to ability to transform at will, but only for a limited time. The character has also appeared in the anime adaptation, the two movies, and other related works.

Kurama was modeled after a friend that Togashi found interesting. When he was introduced, Togashi already planned to have him become an ally to the main characters in the future. During the next arcs, which primarily rely on action, Kurama is shown to be a prominent fighter, something Togashi struggled with, as he was not used to writing a fighting series. He was voiced by Megumi Ogata in Japanese, with Shigeru Nakahara voicing his demon persona. Several voice actors have voiced Kurama in English. The character was well received, due to his sex appeal and his prominent role in the series as a member Team Urameshi. Ogata's performance was also received positively, despite an early negative backlash.

== Creation ==
Kurama was modeled after a friend that manga author Yoshihiro Togashi had. Togashi was impressed by such a person for claiming to be a French aristocrat even though he was Japanese. His name was rumored to be from Mount Kurama. However, Togashi denied it, claiming he applied the kanji to the sounds he chose "based on my senses". In his characterization, Togashi labeled him as "the typical desu ne (ですね, lit. "It's right")" archetype who is usually polite, but scary when he gets angry. The surname, Minamino, comes from the singer Yoko Minamino. There were other surname candidates such as the Japanese celebrities whose first names are also Yōko. Meanwhile, the name Kurama's name came to Togashi on the spur of the moment. Although Kurama and Hiei were introduced as enemies that the protagonist Yusuke Urameshi had to fight, Togashi planned from the beginning to turn Kurama into a supporting character afterward. According to editors from the magazine, Kurama went on to become one of the most popular characters in the series, which Togashi intended due to the way he drew him.

As the YuYu Hakusho transitioned from a comedy to a fighting series, Togashi expressed pressure when incorporating Kurama and Hiei as main characters. For the Four Holy Beasts story arc, Togashi made four enemies on impulse, but the only humans were Yusuke and Kuwabara. When it became clear that they were not strong enough to take on two demons each, Hiei and Kurama appeared on the scene, making their introductions as protagonists. There were also many instances where Togashi would create nearly entire manuscripts by himself, such as the battle between Kurama and Karasu. Mari Kitayama finds Kurama to be the easiest of the main characters to design due to his well-proportioned features.

In the Tagalog anime dub (titled Ghost Fighter), released in the Philippines, the character is initially named Denise because the people creating the dub believed the character was female. Bonner Dytoc, the voice actor for Yusuke (named Eugene in the dub), said that Kurama's female voice and androgynous appearance led to the assumption that Kurama was female. At the time, the internet was not yet widely available in the country, and so the crew received limited information to work with. When later episodes revealed to the crew that the character was male, the crew introduced an explanation. The dub explains that the character's real name is Dennis, and that Denise is a cover name. The dub establishes that the character is actually male, and pretends to be female.

=== Casting ===
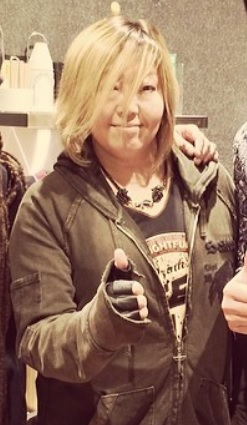
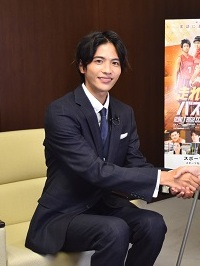
Megumi Ogata (left) has voiced him in Japanese while Jun Shison portrayed Kurama in the live-action.

Kurama was Megumi Ogata's first voice-acting role. She stated that while auditioning it was a requirement by the anime's production company that the character's voice sound like a 17-year-old male but also like that of a member of Takarazuka Revue, an all-female musical theatre group that portrays both men and women. Ogata read the manga to have an idea of the character and thus be faithful to Togashi's work. Ogata said Kurama both cold and lonely due to his wisdom. In contrast to his past life, Ogata finds the human Kurama to be more kind in a similar fashion to a person the voice actress met and thus tried voicing him like person. Nevertheless, voicing a male character was difficult for Ogata which led to assistance from director Noriyuki Abe.

Shigeru Nakahara takes over the role of Kurama for his demon form. Nakahara said there were many directors who would give the approval as long as there was emotion in it. Even when the lines were a bit off, he was sometimes told his performance was good. Before YuYu Hakusho, he used to played cheerful boys and good-natured young men, so the role of the fox demon Kurama was an unusual job. And After the demon fox, he started getting more villainous roles.

For the English adaptations, John Burgmeier voices Kurama in the TV series and first film from the Funimation dubs, Candice Moore in the TV Series from the Animax Asia dub, Chris Orbach for the second film in Central Park Media dub, and David Hayter in the first film from the Anime Works dub. Burgmeier said one of his favorites involving YuYu Hakusho was the Dark Tournament where he was told he had to pull his "scariest voice" for one scene in as he reveals his demon persona for the first time in the television series. This led to jokes among his works about how his tone would appeal to high school girls series.

Kurama was also portrayed by Hiroki Suzuki in the stage play and Jun Shison in the TV drama. Shison said that Kurama had a notable beauty and liked his fight scenes with Karasu and thus enjoyed the ones from the live-action.

== Appearances ==
=== In YuYu Hakusho ===
Fifteen years before the series began, Kurama is a demon who is badly injured and escapes and enteres an embryo in a pregnant human woman, becoming Shuichi Minamino (南野 秀一, Minamino Shūichi) at birth.^{[ch. 21]} Kurama comes to love his now-single human mother, and when she becomes gravely ill he cannot bear to leave her all alone and remains as Shuichi.^{[ch. 21]} Having teamed up with two other demons named Hiei and Goki to steal three treasures, Kurama becomes a target of the protagonist detective Yusuke Urameshi. However, he betrays his partners and takes the a treasure known as the Mirror of Darkness (暗黒鏡, Ankoku-Kyō; known as the "Forlorn Hope" in the English anime dub), a mirror capable of granting the user's desire at the cost of the user's life, to cure his mother of her deadly illness. Yusuke saves Kurama's life with both of them giving some of their lifeforces, therefore they both survive. In the anime, the mirror cancels the sacrifice due to Yusuke's kindness.^{[ch. 21]}

He begins assisting Yusuke in defeating the entities known as The Four Beasts in exchange for a reduced sentence for his crime.^{[ch. 33]} For associating with humans, Kurama and Hiei are invited to take part in the Dark Tournament on Yusuke and Kuwabara's team.^{[ch. 51]} Kurama uses his demonic powers to control plants, including his signature weapon the Rose Whip (薔薇棘鞭刃(ローズ・ウィップ)), a rose he turns into a whip of thorns capable of cutting through steel.^{[ch. 34]} During the Dark Tournament story arc, Kurama is able to temporarily revert to his original form; Fox Demon Kurama ("Yoko Kurama" in the English anime). As Demon Kurama, his powers are far greater and he is capable of creating demonic plants which possess various attributes and highly formidable powers.^{[ch. 83,97]} Following their victory against Toguro's team, Kurama becomes intrigued by a video that consists of mankind's crimes stolen by the rebellious Shinobu Sensui. After watching Yusuke's death by Sensui, Kurama's old demon powers awaken.^{[ch. 147]} He is invited to the Demon Plane to join his old partner Yomi and becomes his second in command.^{[ch. 158,163]} He takes part in the Demon Plane Unification Tournament, losing in the third round. At the end of the series, he is shown working at his stepfather's company.^{[ch. 176]}

=== In other media ===
Kurama appears as a supporting character in Yu Yu Hakusho: The Movie on a mission to rescue Koenma who was taken by the demons Koashura and Garuga. The second film, Yu Yu Hakusho the Movie: Poltergeist Report, Kurama battles the Netherworld's forces. Kurama faces one of Yakumo's servants, who impersonates one of his deceased friends, Kuronue. On finding out about the impersonation and that the henchman had tried to pervert the friendship between him and Kuronue, an enraged Kurama summons a whole forest of sharp-edged bamboo, which pierces the imposter and kills him. Kurama later assists Yusuke in his final battle against Yakumo; Kurama's energy grants Yusuke's Spirit Gun blast versatility, causing it to bend like his Rose Whip.

A spin-off was also written which shows the first meeting of Kurama and Hiei, and how they become allies before the series' start. The character is also playable in multiple video games, including Yu Yu Hakusho Makyō Tōitsusen, Yu Yu Hakusho: Dark Tournament and Yu Yu Hakusho: Tournament Tactics.

== Reception ==
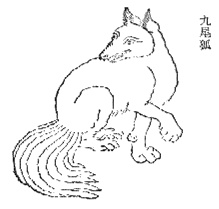
Kurama's past life has been noted to be derivative from Japanese myths of kitsune

Kurama is a popular character with fans, coming in third and second place in the series' first two popularity polls. He came in second in the American Shonen Jump poll. In Animage's Anime Grand Prix, he was ranked as the third most popular male anime character of 1993 and the most popular male character in both 1994 and 1995. His alternate demon form was ranked sixteenth in 1994. Demon Kurama additionally won About.com's "Best Supporting Character" in its 2005 Anime Award Show. Kurama was also ranked the third best male anime character of the 1990s by Newtype. In an "Anime! Anime!" poll, Kurama was rated as the most popular character voiced by Megumi Ogata. In Japanese website goo poll, Kurama was voted as the fourth most sexually appealing character in Shonen Jump. In another poll from Goo, Kurama was voted as the most beautiful of men with long hair. Ever since writing his first storyboards for the Rurouni Kenshin manga, manga author Nobuhiro Watsuki did sketches of protagonist Himura Kenshin's appearance and noticed that he looked like Kurama, which led to multiple comparisons in Japan. Manga author Masashi Kishimoto was mainly inspired to create the Naruto character with the same name, Kurama, based on Togashi's character. In The Japanimated Folktale: Analysis Concerning the Use and Adaptation of Folktale Characteristics in Anime, Kurama's past life is noted to be a common element often used in anime involving folklore elements with Kurama being trickster fox Kitsune.

Kurama and Hiei's popularity in the series led to demand to introduce their characters earlier in the anime. However, the fact that Kurama was voiced by woman rather than a man generated controversy in Japan when the series first aired. Director Noriyuki Abe said it must have been a lot of pressure on Ogata. However, as the anime went on, the actor's charms were brought out and more fans were born rather those who disliked it. Animerica's Justin Kovalsky found Kurama and the others as suitable supporting characters for a fighting anime. THEM Anime Reviews found Kurama appealing especially when interacting with Hiei. Screen Rant said Kurama had one of the most satisfying victories in anime history when defeating Older Toguro due to the high antagonism of the villain who is given one of the scariest ways to die in his rival's plants.

Comic Book Resources also enjoyed Kurama's characterization most notably when fighting in the Dark Tournament due to his darker side being exposed when becoming his past demon persona as well as his several styles of fighting. Anime News Network favorited Kurama's tactics in the early episodes of the Black Chapter arc for standing out as one of the most intelligent characters. Despite the Three Kings arc being panned for being the series' worst story arc, Anime News Network praised it for exploring more of Kurama's dark characterization. DVD Talk agreed for the bigger focus on Kurama's character that was briefly explored in previous arcs. Fandom Post liked the balance that both Kurama and Hiei's sidestories bring to Yusuke's in the final arc but felt they were overshadowed by Hiei's side as the series had not properly explored his backstory before. In "A diversidade homoafetiva nos quadrinhos japoneses: educação sexual, pornografia ou mercado erótico?" Hiei and Kurama are described as popular characters within dojinshi despite there being a relationship between these two in the original work. Time agreed, seeing both Hiei and Kurama as the most attractive characters from the series within the female readers. Don Jaucian of The Philippine Star described Kurama as not "a snarling, macho fighter" but instead having "brushes of femininity" and being "gorgeously meek" while possessing considerable strength.
