= Gin (disambiguation) =

Gin is an alcoholic beverage flavoured with juniper berries.

Gin, Gins or GIN may also refer to:

== People ==
- Gin (name)
- Gin people, China

== Places ==
- Gin, Mississippi
- Gin Branch, a river in Tennessee
- Gin River, a river in Sri Lanka
- Ginifer railway station, Melbourne
- Ginza stop, a Light Rail stop in Hong Kong
- GIN, ISO-3166-1 alpha-3 code of Guinea

== Art, entertainment, and media ==
- Gin (Border Collie), on TV series Britain's Got Talent
- Gin rummy, a card game
- Gin (album), by Cobalt, 2009
- "Gin" (The Apprentice), a 2016 television episode
- Gin (Vice Principals), an episode of the American TV series Vice Principals

== Other uses ==
- Bathtub gin, an alcoholic beverage
- Bathtub Gin, a New York City speakeasy
- Cotton gin, a machine to separate cotton fibers and seedpods
- Gin Gliders, a South Korean manufacturer
- GINS (protein complex) in DNA replication
- An assembler for GEORGE (operating system)
- Horse gin, a mill that uses a horse engine for power
- Countermarked yen ("Gin"), a mark that was placed by the Japanese government on 1 yen coins after 1897
- Gin (1495), a grape-based gin range

== See also ==
- Gin trap, a spring-loaded trap for catching small animals, such as rabbits
- Gin gang, horse mill structure
- Gin Gin (disambiguation)
- Gines (disambiguation)
- Djin
- Gene (disambiguation)
- Jin (disambiguation)
