= Tsing =

Tsing may refer to:

- Jing (disambiguation)
- Jin (disambiguation)
- Qing (disambiguation)
- Qin (disambiguation)
- Ching (disambiguation)
- Chin (disambiguation)
- Tsin (disambiguation)
