= Jing Prefecture =

Jing Prefecture may refer to:

- Jingzhou (historical prefecture in Shaanxi), a historical prefecture in modern Shaanxi, China during the 10th century
- Jingzhou (historical prefecture in Gansu), a historical prefecture in modern Gansu, China between the 5th and 20th centuries

== See also ==
- Jing (disambiguation)
- Jingzhou (disambiguation)
