= Yu Yu Hakusho season 3 =

Season of television series

Yu Yu Hakusho
- Season 3
- No. of episodes: 28

Release
- Original network: Fuji Television
- Original release: February 12 – August 20, 1994

Season chronology
- ← Previous; Season 2 Next → Season 4

The third season of the Yu Yu Hakusho anime series, known as the Chapter Black Saga, was directed by Noriyuki Abe and produced by Fuji Television, Yomiko Advertising and Studio Pierrot. The episodes were released in North America by Funimation. Like the rest of the series, it adapts Yoshihiro Togashi's Yu Yu Hakusho manga from the thirteenth through seventeenth volumes over twenty-eight episodes. The episodes follow Spirit Detective Yusuke Urameshi and his conflict with a former Spirit Detective, Shinobu Sensui, and the latter's desire to open the gateway to Makai.

The season initially ran from February 12 to August 20, 1994, on Fuji Television in Japan. The first twenty-three English episodes were originally shown from July 2004 to January 2005 on Cartoon Network's Toonami programming block. New episodes began airing in October 2005, with the saga concluding in November 2005.

Three pieces of theme music are used for the episodes: one opening theme and two closing themes. The opening theme is "Hohoemi no Bakudan" (微笑みの爆弾; lit. 'Smile Bomb') by Matsuko Mawatari. The closing theme for the first seventeen episodes is Hiro Takahashi's "Unbalance na Kiss o Shite" (アンバランスなKissをして; lit. 'Unbalanced Kissing'), with "Taiyō ga Mata Kagayaku Toki" (太陽がまた輝くとき; lit. 'The Sun is Shining Again'), also by Takahashi, used for the remaining episodes.

Seven DVD compilations, each containing four episodes of the saga, have been released by Funimation. The first compilation was released on January 20, 2004, with the seventh released on October 5, 2004. A collection box, containing all seven DVD compilations, was also released by Funimation on October 11, 2005. A Blu-ray compilation was released by Funimation on September 27, 2011.

== Episodes ==
No.	Title	Directed by	Written by	Storyboard by	Original release date	English release date
67	"Return to Living World" (A New Prologue); Transliteration: "Aratanaru Purorōgu" (Japanese: 新たなるプロローグ)	Haruo Nakayama	Katsuyuki Sumisawa	Masami Shimoda	February 12, 1994	July 31, 2004
Koenma receives a report about strange activities happening in the Living World. Both Kurama and Hiei find out about makai insects trying to inhabit the city once again. Yusuke Urameshi runs afoul of three high school boys, named Asato Kido, Yu Kaito, and Mitsunari Yanagisawa. Using his psychic abilities, Kido paralyzes Yusuke by stepping on his shadow, and they kidnap him in the process. Kido, Kaito, and Yanagisawa leave a message for Kazuma Kuwabara and Botan, who decide to rescue Yusuke.
68	"Setting the Trap" (The Traps Lurking Inside Yojigen Mansion); Transliteration: "Yon Jigen Yashiki ni Hisomu Wana" (Japanese: 四次元屋敷にひそむ罠)	Yorifusa Yamaguchi	Sukehiro Tomita	Takeshi Mori	February 19, 1994	August 7, 2004
Kuwabara and Botan find gather Kurama and Hiei to aid them in rescuing Yusuke. Although Hiei is reluctant to do so, Botan convinces him to come with them. The four head to the mansion where Yusuke is held, and find Kaito in the first room. Kaito explains that they have entered a realm of four dimensions, in which fantasy can be altered into reality. Hiei has been turned to stone after falling prey by one of Kaito's attacks, one that forbids from saying the word "hot". Kuwabara is unable to snatch from Yanagisawa the key to the room leading toward Yusuke. Kurama has agreed to a game of taboo against Kaito.
69	"The Power of Taboo" (The Power of Taboo! Kurama's Intellect); Transliteration: "Kinku no Pawā! Kurama no Zunō" (Japanese: 禁句のパワー! 蔵馬の頭脳)	Kazunori Mizuno	Yoshiyuki Ōhashi	Motosuke Takahashi	February 26, 1994	August 14, 2004
Kuwabara and Botan also turns into stone due to saying hot as well. Kurama discreetly takes the key from Yanagisawa. Kurama challenges Kaito to a game of taboo in which letters of the alphabet become taboo one by one over the course of the game, waging their souls as their bids. Kurama surrounds himself with his manifested plants while Kaito goes to the restroom, emerging when only the first two letters are left. Kurama yells to scare him, but he manages not to cry out. It is until Kurama makes silly faces at Kaito that cause the latter to laugh, thereby breaking the taboo. Kaito loses his own soul, thus freeing the others.
70	"Genkai's Ruse" (The Terrifying Truth! A New Mystery); Transliteration: "Osorubeki Shinjitsu! Arata na Nazo" (Japanese: 恐るべき真実! 新たな謎)	Shigeru Ueda	Katsuyuki Sumisawa	Akihiro Enomoto	March 5, 1994	August 21, 2004
Yanagisawa shows Kuwabara, Botan, Kurama, and Hiei to four aberrant stairways that will lead to Yusuke. Yanagisawa disguises himself as one of the four, forcing Yusuke to determine who is the impostor. Unable to figure out who actually is the fraud, Yusuke manages to use his intuition to successfully identify that Kuwabara has been impersonated. It is revealed that Genkai orchestrated this test of perception, in which the mind will be needed as much as the body.
71	"The Tunnel" (The Coming Terror! The Gateway To The Demon World!); Transliteration: "Semari Kuru Kyōfu! Makai no Tobira" (Japanese: 迫り来る恐怖! 魔界の扉)	Masami Shimoda	Hiroshi Hashimoto	Masami Shimoda	March 12, 1994	August 28, 2004
Genkai informs that a breach within the city is carving a tunnel toward the Demon World, causing humans to experience supernatural powers. Koenma further explains that violent apparitions with chaotically flood the streets and the tunnel will soon be opened. Only B-class demons will be able to pass the tunnel, while the S-class and A-class demons will be repelled by the barrier. The protagonists are given three weeks to seek and destroy the ones responsible for the breach.
72	"The Reader" (Envoys of the Demon Realm! Seven Enemies); Transliteration: "Makai no Shisha! Shichinin no Teki" (Japanese: 魔界の使者! 七人の敵)	Junya Koshiba	Sukehiro Tomita	Junya Koshiba	March 19, 1994	September 4, 2004
Yusuke, Genkai, Kido, and Yanagisawa go to a local bar, only to find Murota, another psychic human with the ability to tap into peoples minds, in an attempt to recruit him. Yusuke challenges Murota to a boxing match, easily defeating him. The emergent psychic agrees to assist the four in finding the person causing the breach only to be overwhelmed by the violent mental backlash of the assailant they're looking for. Scant moments after identifying their perpetrator, Murota is sent to the hospital after being injured due to a pencil eraser shot by Kaname "Sniper" Hagiri. He then finds out that seven people are responsible for the breach.
73	"The Doctor's Disease" (The Stalking, Demonic Hand of the Doctor); Transliteration: "Shinobiyoru Dokutā no Ma no Te" (Japanese: 忍び寄るドクターの魔の手)	Hitoyuki Matsui	Yoshiyuki Ōhashi	Hitoyuki Matsui	March 26, 1994	September 11, 2004
Yanagisawa and Murota have been incapacitated due to viral insects released by Minoru "Doctor" Kamiya. Kido later has his spinal cord severed by Doctor's psychic scalpel. Yusuke arrives when a group of doctors surround Kido. Yusuke is able to determine Doctor's identity after Kido uses his shadow to write his name. Yusuke chases after Doctor, recognizes his talents of cutting and stitching.
74	"Sleep, Doctor, Sleep" (Bring Down the Territory!!); Transliteration: "Teritorī o Uchi Yabure!!" (Japanese: テリトリーを打ちやぶれ!!)	Akiyuki Shinbo	Katsuyuki Sumisawa	Akiyuki Shinbo	April 2, 1994	September 18, 2004
For their concern over Yusuke and Kuwabara, Keiko Yukimura and Shizuru Kuwabara go to the hospital, albeit the former becomes poisoned by a viral insect. Yusuke battles Doctor, and is forced to come to a decision whether to kill him to save the people in the hospital. Kuwabara, Botan, Kurama, and Kaito make it to the hospital, alert of the situation. Kurama finds Keiko and Shizuru in the elevator. Ultimately, Yusuke blasts Doctor outside of his territory, rendering him unconscious and resolving the situation.
75	"Caught in the Rain" (Seaman — A Trap Lurking in the Rain); Transliteration: "Shīman. Ame ni Hisomu Wana" (Japanese: シーマン・雨に潜む罠)	Haruo Nakayama	Hiroshi Hashimoto	Shigeru Ueda	April 9, 1994	September 25, 2004
Koenma updates Yusuke, Kuwabara, and Botan that the breach will occur in one week, due to its spherical shape. Yusuke and Kuwabara part ways after the latter decides to attend a concert with his friends. Meanwhile, Kurama goes to see Koenma, as he suspects that Koenma may already know the identity of who is behind the plot to destroy the barrier. Kuwabara and his friends are soon attacked by Kiyoshi "Seaman" Mitarai. While Seaman traps Kuwabara's friends inside his aquatic creature, Kuwabara's inability to use his powers force him into a critical situation.
76	"Kuwabara: Awakening" (Kuwabara Restored?! A Power Awakened); Transliteration: "Kuwabara Fukkatsu?! Mezameta Chikara" (Japanese: 桑原復活?! 目覚めた力)	Yorifusa Yamaguchi	Sukehiro Tomita	Yorifusa Yamaguchi	April 16, 1994	October 2, 2004
The dormant powers of Kuwabara have awaken, as he continues his fight against Seaman. Seaman realizes that Kuwabara is the one that can shatter barriers between different dimensions. Using his new spirit sword, Kuwabara frees his friends and defeats Seaman. Kuwabara brings his friends, along with Seaman, back to his home. Seaman talks about a video called Chapter Black, showing footage of victims of humankind's atrocities against their fellow men. Viewing of this footage can change a human against its own kind. Shinobu "Black Angel" Sensui, is revealed to be a former spirit detective, unveiled as the mastermind behind the plot to remove the barrier to the Demon World.
77	"Sensui's Fall" (The Dark Past of the Spirit Realm Detective); Transliteration: "Reikai Tantei no Kuroi Kako" (Japanese: 霊界探偵の黒い過去)	Shigeru Ueda	Yoshiyuki Ōhashi	Akihiro Enomomto	April 23, 1994	October 9, 2004
Sensui, being able to sense and destroy apparitions, was responsible for sealing up a smaller tunnel to the Demon World, in which only lower class demons were allowed through. Sakyo sold these demons in his black market, acquiring millions of dollars in profit. Sensui witnesses humans practicing sacrificial rituals on demons, causing him to insanely murder the humans for their cruelty. Therefore, the breach will serve as atonement for the sin of the human race. Sensui and Sniper make their appearance, launching an attack on Seaman. Indicating that there is only two days preceding the breach, it is up to Yusuke, Kuwabara, and Kurama to stop Sensui.
78	"Divide and Conquer" (Charge! Dark Angel); Transliteration: "Shutsugeki! Dāku Enjeru" (Japanese: 出撃! ダークエンジェル)	Masami Shimomda	Katsuyuki Sumisawa	Masami Shimoda	April 30, 1994	October 16, 2004
Yusuke battles Sensui in the streets, being overwhelmed by his moves. Elsewhere, Botan and Seaman are constantly attacked by Sniper, who is relentlessly firing small objects against them, in which Shizuru is badly injured by a diverted attack orchestrated by Sensui. Yusuke, Kuwabara, and Kurama chase Sensui inside a building, fighting against him one by one, only to be equally matched. Sensui leaves as Sniper arrives, devising a scheme to kidnap Kuwabara.
79	"The Human Race" (Yusuke's Mad Dash! Save Kuwabara!); Transliteration: "Yūsuke Gekisō! Kuwabara o Sukue!" (Japanese: 幽助激走! 桑原を救え!)	Kazunori Mizuno	Hiroshi Hashimoto	Junya Koshiba	May 7, 1994	October 23, 2004
Sensui travels away while Yusuke is forced to contend with Sniper. Genkai arrives to heal the harsh wounds of both Botan and Shizuru. Sniper eventually marks Yusuke with targets, enabling his projectiles to be sent without him even having to aim. Koenma and Genkai are informed by Seaman of Kurabara's potential ability to shatter barriers. Sniper sends hundreds of rock projectiles at Yusuke with pinpoint accuracy, putting the latter in a dangerous situation.
80	"Moving Target" (Hagiri's Targets! Death Crest Cross Spots); Transliteration: "Hagiri no Hyōteki! Shimonjūjihan" (Japanese: 刃霧の標的! 死紋十字斑)	Kazunori Mizuno	Sukehiro Tomita	Motosuke Takahashi	May 14, 1994	October 30, 2004
Sniper continues his battle against Yusuke, using a semi-trailer truck as a projectile, and is nearly victorious until Hiei arrives. In a swing of his sword, Hiei incapacitates him. Hiei later fights Yusuke, only to prove the point the motivation that harnesses spirit energy. Hiei decides to join in the group in an attempt to stop Sensui.
81	"Let the Games Begin" (The Game World Inside the Cave); Transliteration: "Dōkutsu no Naka no Gēmu Wārudo" (Japanese: 洞窟の中のゲームワールド)	Hitoyuki Matsui	Yoshiyuki Ōhashi	Hitoyuki Matsui	May 21, 1994	November 6, 2004
Seaman leads Yusuke, Kurama, Hiei, Genkai, Kaito, and Yanagisawa to the breach hideout, where they face Tsukihito "Gamemaster" Amanuma, a young boy and a stellar gamer whose territory lets him bring any video game to life. The seven must participate in a video game testing seven areas of skills. Seaman is to play in a tennis match in the first round, becoming triumphant in the end.
82	"If You Could Play Forever" (Gamemaster's Fearsome Aptitude); Transliteration: "Gēmu Masutā Kyōi no Jitsuryoku" (Japanese: ゲームマスター脅威の実力)	Akiyuki Shinbo	Katsuyuki Sumisawa	Akiyuki Shinbo	May 28, 1994	November 13, 2004
Genkai plays battleship target game, easily winning the round. Yusuke plays in a fighting tournament, eventually becoming the victor. Gamemaster decides to play against Kaito, in a trivial pursuit. Kaito is handily defeated when Gamemaster answers each question before they are displayed.
83	"Game Over" (The Remaining Measure! Kurama's Resolve); Transliteration: "Nokosareta Shudan! Kurama no Ketsudan" (Japanese: 残された手段! 蔵馬の決断)	Haruo Nakayama	Hiroshi Hashimoto	Shigeru Ueda	June 4, 1994	November 20, 2004
Kurama and Gamemaster play a variation of Tetris. Kurama reveals to Gamemaster that he will die if he loses the game. This emotional control and intimidation result in Gamemaster forfeiting the game and his life in the process. Koenma tells Botan that he will remove his pacifier to prevent the breach. Yusuke, Kurama, Hiei, and Seaman arrive at Sensui's lair, seeing Kuwabara held hostage and the breach nearly opened.
84	"Kurama's Anger, Gourmet's Guest" (Kurama's Fury! Who is That, Really?!); Transliteration: "Kurama no Ikari! Shōtai wa Dare da?!" (Japanese: 蔵馬の怒り! 正体は誰だ?!)	Shigeru Ueda	Sukehiro Tomita	Akihiro Enomoto	June 11, 1994	November 27, 2004
Kurama, still torn over the outcome of the Gamemaster, attacks Sadao "Gourmet" Makihara, who is responsible for consuming Murota. Gourmet is revealed to have been taken over by the Elder Toguro, in which Kurama traps him within the sinning tree, forcing him to hallucinate his worst fear for all eternity. Kuwabara is no longer held captive.
85	"Spirit Detective Showdown" (Spirit Realm Detectives — A fated One-on-One Battle); Transliteration: "Reikai Tantei. Shukumei no Ikkiuchi" (Japanese: 霊界探偵・宿命の一騎討ち)	Kazunori Mizuno	Yoshiyuki Ōhashi	Junya Koshiba	June 18, 1994	December 4, 2004
While Kuwabara, Kurama, Hiei, and Seaman are placed into another dimension by "Gatekeeper" Itsuki, Yusuke must face Sensui alone. Itsuki explains to the four of his first encounter with Sensui, recognizing him for his affection. It is apparent that Sensui's past battle experience and long-trained abilities as a spirit detective put Yusuke at a disadvantage.
86	"The Difference Maker" (Yusuke's Tough Battle! A Decisive Difference); Transliteration: "Yūsuke Kusen! Ketteiteki na Sa" (Japanese: 幽助苦戦! 決定的な差)	Masami Shimoda	Katsuyuki Sumisawa	Masami Shimoda	June 25, 1994	December 11, 2004
Sensui repeatedly launches his splinter resshūken, sending blasts of energy spheres, at Yusuke. Koenma journeys his way toward Sensui's lair. As Yusuke manages to gain the advantage through sheer determination, Sensui switches personalities to Kazuya, a merciless killer. Itsuki construes that Sensui has dissociative identity disorder, having seven split personalities that had emerged from the traumatic encounter with humans who had sacrificed demons in his past. As Yusuke is about to lose his life from the trigger of the gun, Koenma appears just in the nick of time.
87	"Power Between the Teeth" (Koenma — Primed With The Mafukan!); Transliteration: "Koenma. Kakugo no Mafūkan!" (Japanese: コエンマ・覚悟の魔封環!)	Kazunori Mizuno	Hiroshi Hashimoto	Motosuke Takahashi	July 2, 1994	December 18, 2004
Koenma threatens Sensui with his wicked seal conscience ring, a defensive spell in his pacifier that can trap even S-class demons. Yusuke stops Koenma before he attacks and handily defeats Kazuya. Shinobu, the primary personality, takes control of Sensui's body.
88	"The True Face of Sensui" (Sensui — Sacred Light Energy Unleashed!); Transliteration: "Sensui. Tokihanatareta Seikōki" (Japanese: 仙水・解き放たれた聖光気)	Hitoyuki Matsui	Sukehiro Tomita	Junya Koshiba	July 9, 1994	October 15, 2005
Sensui reveals his sacred energy, which places him on par with S-class demons. To stop him, Koenma releases the wicked seal conscience ring, but Sensui's power enables him to destroy it, making the situation seem hopeless.
89	"Death of a Spirit Detective" (Foreboding! When Everything Comes to a Halt); Transliteration: "Yokan! Subete ga Tomaru Toki" (Japanese: 予感! 全てが止まる時)	Noriyuki Abe	Yoshiyuki Ōhashi	Akiyuki Shinbo	July 16, 1994	October 22, 2005
Yusuke fares poorly against Sensui's sacred energy, while his allies desperately attempt to break through Itsuki's dimension. Kuwabara manages to do so with his dimension sword, reminiscing of his times with Yusuke. However, before Kuwabara can get to him, Yusuke is struck down by Sensui.
90	"Attempting Revenge" (Carrying On Their Friend's Will!); Transliteration: "Tomo no Ishi o Tsuge!" (Japanese: 友の意志を継げ!)	Haruo Nakayama	Katsuyuki Sumisawa	Shigeru Ueda	July 23, 1994	October 29, 2005
Kuwabara, Kurama, and Hiei increase their power and pursue Sensui through the breach, incensed by the death of Yusuke. Kurama transforms into Yoko Kurama, as Hiei releases the dragon of the darkness flame. Since Kurama and Hiei only have demon energy, they are unable to pass the barrier, unlike Sensui, who possesses sacred energy. Kuwabara slices through the barrier between worlds to pursue Sensui into the Demon World. Though they have him outnumbered, they prove to be outmatched against Sensui's attacks.
91	"Waking the Lost" (A Time of Awakening! The Battle Commences Again); Transliteration: "Kakusei no Toki! Batoru Futatabi" (Japanese: 覚醒の時! バトル再び)	Shigeru Ueda	Hiroshi Hashimoto	Akihiro Enomoto	July 30, 1994	November 5, 2005
The spirit defense force is dispatched from the Spirit World to seal the breach. They are also ordered to terminate Yusuke, for he is a genetically inherited half-demon. However, Yusuke discovers his half-demon nature and awakens. Pu is transported to the lair and transformed into a phoenix. Yusuke and Koenma enter into the breach, making their way toward Sensui.
92	"The Proof" (The Ultimate Battle! Proof of Demon Kinship); Transliteration: "Kyūkyoku no Tatakai! Mazoku no Akashi" (Japanese: 究極の戦い! 魔族の証)	Masami Shimoda	Yoshiyuki Ōhashi	Masami Shimoda	August 6, 1994	November 12, 2005
A newly-revived Yusuke resumes his battle with Sensui. Kuwabara, Kurama, Hiei, and Koenma watch as Yusuke collides with Sensui, demon energy versus sacred energy. Nonetheless, Yusuke's body is taken over by a mysterious force, fully awakening his demon side.
93	"Sensui's End" (A Conclusion! Deathbattle in the Demon Realm); Transliteration: "Ketchaku! Makai no Shitō!" (Japanese: 決着! 魔界の死闘!)	Junya Koshiba	Yoshiyuki Ōhashi	Junya Koshiba	August 13, 1994	November 19, 2005
Yusuke's enhanced powers easily enable him to overcome Sensui, much to his surprise. Itsuki arrives and tells the group that Sensui was plagued with an internal disease, only having a month left to live. It is revealed that Koenma had used his wicked seal conscience ring to resurrect Gamemaster. Sensui clarify the reason for opening a tunnel to the Demon World, for which it is his grave as well as his repentance. Itsuki takes Sensui's body into his dimension, in solitude and peace.
94	"Topside" (Epilogue! Towards Tomorrow!); Transliteration: "Epirōgu! Ashita e!" (Japanese: エピローグ! 明日へ!)	Hitoyuki Matsui	Sukehiro Tomita	Hitoyuki Matsui	August 20, 1994	November 26, 2005
Doctor, Sniper, Seaman, Gamemaster, Kido, Kaito, and Yanagisawa resume their normal lives. Kurama and Hiei lie low, keeping an eye on Yusuke. Kuwabara and Keiko return to junior high school life. Yusuke feels unsatisfied that his match with Sensui was interrupted, and is conflicted over his half-demon nature.
