= Yu Yu Hakusho season 4 =

Season of television series

Yu Yu Hakusho
- Season 4
- No. of episodes: 18

Release
- Original network: Fuji Television
- Original release: August 27, 1994 – January 7, 1995

Season chronology
- ← Previous; Season 3

The fourth and final season of the Yu Yu Hakusho anime series, known as the Saga of the Three Kings, was directed Noriyuki Abe and produced by Fuji Television, Yomiko Advertising and Studio Pierrot. The episodes were released in North America by Funimation. It adapts Yoshihiro Togashi's Yu Yu Hakusho manga series by Yoshihiro Togashi from the seventeenth through nineteenth volumes over eighteen episodes. The episodes cover Yusuke Urameshi's journey to Makai to meet his demon ancestor, and his attempts to resolve the unstable political situation in Makai.

The season initially ran from August 27 to January 7, 1995, on Fuji Television in Japan. The English episodes were shown from December 2005 to April 2006 on Cartoon Network's Toonami programming block.

Three pieces of theme music are used for the episodes; one opening theme and two closing themes. The opening theme is "Hohoemi no Bakudan" (微笑みの爆弾; lit. 'Smile Bomb') by Matsuko Mawatari. The closing themes are "Taiyō ga Mata Kagayaku Toki" (太陽がまた輝くとき; lit. 'The Sun is Shining Again') by Hiro Takahashi, used for the first eight episodes, and Mawatari's "Daydream Generation" for all remaining episodes except episode 112, which uses "Hohoemi no Bakudan" as the closing theme.

Six DVD compilations, each containing three episodes of the saga, have been released by Funimation. The first compilation was released on November 23, 2004, and the sixth compilation was released on July 19, 2005. A DVD collection box, containing all six compilations of the saga, was released by Funimation on March 7, 2006. A Blu-ray compilation was released by Funimation on November 29, 2011.

== Episodes ==
No.	Title	Directed by	Written by	Storyboard by	Original release date	English release date
95	"Yusuke's Destiny" (Yusuke's Destiny — Footsteps of Danger); Transliteration: "Yūsuke no Unmei. Kiken no Ashioto" (Japanese: 幽助の運命・危険の足音)	Akiyuki Shinbo	Katsuyuki Sumisawa	Motosuke Takahashi	August 27, 1994	December 3, 2005
Yusuke Urameshi is informed that Koenma is hiding from the Spirit World for disobeying the direct order of having Yusuke erased from existence. Desperate to find a solution to his situation, Yusuke later visits Genkai, who advises him to go to the home of a former spirit detective named Kuroko, getting to know her children and husband as well as their talents. He is approached by three men, who offer an invitation for Yusuke to travel back to the Demon World.
96	"Three Strangers, Three Kings" (Visitors of Darkness — The Mystery Deepens); Transliteration: "Yami no Hōmonsha. Fukamaru Nazo" (Japanese: 闇の訪問者・深まる謎)	Haruo Nakayama	Yoshiyuki Ōhashi	Shigeru Ueda	September 3, 1994	December 10, 2005
The three men reveal they are present on the behalf of Raizen, one of the three kings of the Demon World. These three kings have been on a debate concerning the feasting of human bodies for over half a millennium. Yusuke tests his strength and agility against one of the men, Hokushin, who has the ability of elasticity. Upon defeat, Yusuke punches him back for not telling the whole story about the three kings.
97	"Departing Living World" (Parting — Our Respective Departures); Transliteration: "Wakare. Sorezore no Tabidachi" (Japanese: 別れ・それぞれの旅立ち)	Junya Koshiba	Sukehiro Tomita	Kazunori Mizuno	September 10, 1994	December 17, 2005
After the three men leave, Kuroko tells Yusuke to leave as well. Kurama and Hiei have received invitations from the other two kings, Yomi and Mukuro, respectively. As Yusuke ponders on whether to accept Raizen's invitation, he says his final farewell to Keiko Yukimura, saying he will return on his 18th birthday.
98	"Return to Demon World" (To the Demon Realm! A Meeting with the Father); Transliteration: "Makai e! Chichi to no Taimen" (Japanese: 魔界へ! 父との対面)	Shigeru Ueda	Hiroshi Hashimoto	Akihiro Enomoto	September 17, 1994	December 24, 2005
Kazuma Kuwabara receives the news that Yusuke, Kurama, and Hiei are on their way toward the Demon World. The three men escort Yusuke into the fortress of Raizen. Yusuke, incensed at Raizen's interference in his fight with Shinobu "Black Angel" Sensui, encounters and attacks him, but is easily defeated. Raizen then begins to train Yusuke as his successor.
99	"Haunted by the Past" (Unforgettable Memories! A Time of Birth); Transliteration: "Wasure e nu Kioku. Tanjō no Toki" (Japanese: 忘れ得ぬ記憶・誕生の時)	Masami Shimoda	Katsuyuki Sumisawa	Masami Shimoda	September 24, 1994	December 31, 2005
Hiei undergoes the harsh training of Mukuro, being pushed to his own physical and emotional limits. He recounts to when he was born, sent into exile for being a curse to his village as a fire demon. Mukuro later brings Shigure, the surgeon that implanted the Jagan eye, to fight Hiei, for the reward of seeing Mukuro unmasked.
100	"The Secret of the Jagan" (The Secrets of the Jagan Revealed); Transliteration: "Akasareru Jagan no Himitsu" (Japanese: 明かされる邪眼の秘密)	Junya Koshiba	Yoshiyuki Ōhashi	Junya Koshiba	October 1, 1994	January 7, 2006
Hiei ponders his past of how he was raised by a group of bandits after being exiled. He recalls to when Shigure implanted the Jagan eye on his forehead as well as to when he trained with Shigure. Back to the present, he and Shigure simultaneously deal fatal blows to each other. Hiei thinks back to when he returned to the village in learning the aftermath of his banishment. Mukuro heals Hiei and reveals her true form as her sign of trust in him.
101	"Reunion of the Bandits" (Demon Realm Thieves — A Thousand-Year Reunion); Transliteration: "Makai Tōzoku. Sennen me no Saikai" (Japanese: 魔界盗賊・千年目の再会)	Hitoyuki Matsui	Hiroshi Hashimoto	Hitoyuki Matsui	October 15, 1994	January 14, 2006
Kurama travels to the territory of Yomi, Kurama's former second-in-command. Yomi tells of when the two were close friends a millennium ago, recalling their lives as bandits. He further remembers about when he was first struck by blindness. However, he finds out that Kurama was responsible for this, as he had hired an assassin for obvious reasons. Consequently, Yomi forces Kurama to serve him under threat of killing his human mother.
102	"Torn Between Identities" (Yoko Transformation! A Creeping Bloodlust); Transliteration: "Yōko Henka! Shinobiyoru Satsui" (Japanese: 妖狐変化! 忍び寄る殺意)	Junya Koshiba	Sukehiro Tomita	Motosuke Takahashi	October 22, 1994	January 21, 2006
As Kurama mulls over Yomi's offer, he goes back to the Living World to gather allies for Yomi, those who survived the Dark Tournament. After Sachi, one of Yomi's subordinates, attacks him, Kurama transforms into Yoko Kurama, with his demon side seemingly dominating his personality.
103	"Inheritance" (A Father's Last Words — Memories of a Distant Day); Transliteration: "Chichi no Yuigon. Tōi Hi no Omoi" (Japanese: 父の遺言・遠い日の想い)	Haruo Nakayama	Katsuyuki Sumisawa	Shigeru Ueda	October 29, 1994	January 28, 2006
As Raizen is on death's doorstep, he tells Yusuke the story of his lineage, falling in love with a female human who treated his wounds. After making love with this woman, he vowed never to eat another human again, understanding that the two came from opposite backgrounds. Raizen dies, and Yusuke is left to find a way to stop total war from taking place in the Demon World.
104	"Every Demon for Himself" (An Unexpected Proposal — A Change in the Demon Realm); Transliteration: "Igai na Teian. Makai no Hendō" (Japanese: 意外な提案・魔界の変動)	Shigeru Ueda	Yoshiyuki Ōhashi	Akihiro Enomoto	November 5, 1994	February 4, 2006
Due to Raizen's demise, Mukuro intends to attack Yomi with full force. To avert the situation, Yusuke offers an alternative to war, being a tournament whose winner will be crowned the king of the Demon World. Much of Raizen's friends visit his tombstone, all preparing to fight in the upcoming tournament in his honor.
105	"The Preliminaries" (Great Battle in the Demon Realm — The Preliminaries Commence!); Transliteration: "Makai Taisen. Yosen Kaishi!" (Japanese: 魔界大戦・予選開始!)	Masami Shimoda	Sukehiro Tomita	Masami Shimoda	November 12, 1994	February 11, 2006
Yusuke arrives for the competition, meeting Kurama, Hiei, Yomi, Mukuro, and a host of former competitors from the Dark Tournament. In the preliminary matches, the aforementioned combatants easily advance.
106	"The Battle of Father and Son" (Father and Son Battle! Yomi and Shura); Transliteration: "Tatakau Oyako! Yomi to Shura" (Japanese: 闘う親子! 黄泉と修羅)	Junya Koshiba	Katsuyuki Sumisawa	Junya Koshiba	November 19, 1994	February 18, 2006
Yomi battles his son Shura in the preliminaries, and his overwhelming power coerces Shura to eventually concede. Yusuke announces that the tournament should be held every few years, much like a presidential election, to promote fair rule of the Demon World.
107	"The Demon World Tournament Begins" (Fierce Fighting! Men Fighting for their Dreams); Transliteration: "Gekitō! Yume ni Kaketa Otoko Tachi" (Japanese: 激闘! 夢に賭けた男たち)	Hitoyuki Matsui	Katsuyuki Sumisawa	Hitoyuki Matsui	November 26, 1994	February 25, 2006
The initial matches continue, with many of the Dark Tournament combatants finding their match in Raizen's S-class demon friends that joined the tournament.
108	"Farewell, Kurama" (Kurama, A Break with the Past); Transliteration: "Kurama, Kako to no Ketsubetsu" (Japanese: 蔵馬, 過去との決別)	Masami Shimoda	Sukehiro Tomita	Noriyuki Abe	December 3, 1994	March 4, 2006
Kurama battles Shigure, and is torn over his conflicting identities. Finally determining that he will live as a human, Kurama dispatches Shigure with his full power.
109	"Love and War" (Showdown! Hiei and Mukuro); Transliteration: "Taiketsu! Hiei to Mukuro" (Japanese: 対決! 飛影とムクロ)	Akiyuki Shinbo	Yoshiyuki Ōhashi	Motosuke Takahashi	December 10, 1994	March 11, 2006
Hiei and Mukuro battle, each questioning the chains that each others' past have left on them. As the battle concludes, Hiei is defeated, but manages to shatter Mukuro's shackles in the process.
110	"A Reason to Fight" (My Power — This is My All!); Transliteration: "Ore no Chikara. Kore ga Subete da!" (Japanese: 俺の力・これが全てだ!)	Shigeru Ueda	Hiroshi Hashimoto	Akihiro Enomoto	December 17, 1994	March 18, 2006
Yusuke battles Yomi, who is incensed that Yusuke suddenly finds no reason for fighting. Realizing that he must fight for the sake of his friends, Yusuke calls upon all his power to battle Yomi.
111	"Closure" (Concluded! The End of the Conflict); Transliteration: "Ketchaku! Gekitō no Hate Ni" (Japanese: 決着! 激闘の果てに)	Masami Shimoda	Yoshiyuki Ōhashi	Masami Shimoda	December 24, 1994	March 25, 2006
As the two combatants release all their power, they simultaneously hit each other, with Yusuke being rendered unconscious and Yomi barely remaining standing. Ultimately, a weakened Yomi proves unable to win the tournament, and Enki, one of Raizen's friends, becomes the ruler of the Demon World, and institutes an era of peace for three years. Yusuke prepares to leave for the Living World, hoping to come back to the Demon World sometime soon.
112	"To the Future" (Forever YuYu Hakusho!); Transliteration: "Fōebā! YūYūHakusho" (Japanese: フォーエバー!幽遊白書)	Junya Koshiba	Yoshiyuki Ōhashi	Junya Koshiba	January 7, 1995	April 1, 2006
2 years after the tournament, the protagonists have found peace in their lives. Kazuma Kuwabara, Kurama, Keiko, and Shizuru Kuwabara pass by Genkai, meeting with Yukina, Botan, and Koenma as well. Genkai tells the group to protect her estate after she dies. They all decide to go to the beach, where Keiko yells for Yusuke at the beach. Yusuke suddenly appears, and is tackled by Keiko, who kisses him. Soon, the gang is seen splashing water at each other while the rest of the cast is shown before the end of the series.
