= Tsin dynasty =

Tsin dynasty may refer to:

- Qin dynasty (221–206 BC)
- Jin dynasty (266–420)
- Jin dynasty (1115–1234)
- Later Jin (1616–1636)
- Qing dynasty (1644–1912)

== See also ==
- Jin § States
- Qin § Dynasties and states
