= Tsin =

Tsin may refer to:

- Mace (unit), known in Hong Kong as Tsin
- Irregular spelling of Jin (disambiguation)
- Irregular spelling of Qin (disambiguation)

== See also ==
- Tsing (disambiguation)
