= Susumu =

- Gender: Male

Origin
- Origin: Japanese
- Meaning: Different meanings depending on the kanji used

Susumu is a masculine Japanese given name. Notable people with the name include:

- Susumu Akagi (born 1972) Japanese voice actor
- Susumu Aoyagi (青柳 進, born 1968), Japanese baseball player
- Susumu Chiba (born 1970), Japanese voice actor
- Susumu Esashika (江刺家 進; born 1937), Japanese bobsledder
- Susumu Fujita (1912–1991), Japanese actor
- Susumu Fukui (born 1947), Japanese Go player
- Susumu Hani (born 1928), Japanese film director
- Susumu Hirano (平野 進; 1910–?), Japanese ice hockey player
- Susumu Hirasawa (born 1954), Japanese progressive-electronic artist
- Susumu Ishii (1924–1991), Japanese criminal
- Susumu Kagawa (香川 征; 1944–2021), Japanese urologist
- Susumu Kajiyama (born around 1950), Japanese criminal
- Susumu Katsumata (disambiguation), multiple people
- Susumu Kitagawa (born 1951), Japanese chemist
- Susumu Kobayashi (小林 晋; born 1973), Japanese sport shooter
- Susumu Kuno (born 1933), Japanese linguist and author
- Susumu Kurobe (born 1939), Japanese actor
- Susumu Matsushima (1913–2009), Japanese photographer
- Susumu Matsushita (born 1950), Japanese manga artist.
- Susumu Mochizuki (born 1978), Japanese professional wrestler
- Susumu Nikaido (二階堂 進; 1909–2000), Japanese politician
- Susumu Noguchi (1908–1961), Japanese professional boxer
- Susumu Ohno (1928–2000), Japanese American geneticist and evolutionary biologist
- Susumu Ojima (born 1953), Japanese entrepreneur
- Susumu Ōno (1919–2008), Japanese linguist
- Susumu Sugiyama (杉山進, 1932–2025), Japanese alpine skier
- Susumu Tabuchi (田渕 晋; born 1980), Japanese swimmer
- Susumu Tachi (born 1946), Japanese academic
- Susumu Taira (平良進; 1934–2024), Japanese actor
- Susumu Takahashi (高橋 進; 1920–2001), Japanese middle-distance runner
- Susumu Takano (高野 進; born 1961), Japanese sprinter
- Susumu Terajima (born 1963), Japanese actor
- Tōki Susumu (born 1974), Japanese former sumo wrestler
- Susumu Tonegawa (1939–2026), Japanese scientist
- Susumu Watanabe (渡邉 晋; born 1973), Japanese footballer and manager
- Yamazaki Susumu (circa 1833–1868), Japanese spy
- Susumu Yamaguchi (山口 益; 1895–1976), Japanese Buddhist scholar
- Susumu Yanase (born 1950), Japanese politician
- Susumu Yokota (21st century), Japanese composer
- Susumu Yoshikawa (よしかわ 進; born 1950), Japanese manga artist

== Fictional characters ==
- Susumu Gondawara, a minor character from Yakuza 2/Yakuza Kiwami 2
- Susumu Hori (堀進 or ホリ・ススム), main character from Mr. Driller
- Susumu Kodai, main character from Space Battleship Yamato
- Susumu Utada, a character from Machine Robo Rescue

== See also ==
- 6925 Susumu, a main-belt asteroid
- 晉 (disambiguation)
