= Ging =

Ging or Gings may refer to:

- Ging (film), a 1964 Philippine film
- Ging (live CD), a GNU variant
- Ging (surname), a surname
- Ging, the stage name of musician Adam Feeney (f.k.a. Frank Dukes)
- Gings, Indiana, a community in the United States
- Ging Freecss, a character in the manga series Hunter × Hunter

== See also ==
- Ginge (disambiguation)
- Gingy
- Jing (disambiguation)
