= Bathtub (disambiguation) =

A bathtub is a large container for holding water to bathe in.

Bathtub may also refer to:

- The Bathtub, the underground foundation of the World Trade Center
- The Bathtub (film), a 2016 German-Austrian short film
- Bathtub curve, a concept in engineering
- Bathtub gin, alcoholic beverage
- Bathtub Gin, New York City speakeasy
- "Chapter Seven: The Bathtub", an episode of Stranger Things
