= Jin =

Jin may refer to:

== States ==
=== Jìn 晉 ===
- Jin (Chinese state) (晉國), major state of the Zhou dynasty, existing from the 11th century BC to 376 BC
- Jin dynasty (266–420) (晉朝), also known as Liang Jin and Sima Jin
- Jin (Later Tang precursor) (晉國; 907–923), Five Dynasties and Ten Kingdoms period
- Later Jin (Five Dynasties) (後晉; 936–947), Five Dynasties and Ten Kingdoms period

=== Jīn 金 ===
- Jin dynasty (1115–1234) (金朝), also known as the Jurchen Jin
- Later Jin (1616–1636) (後金; 1616–1636), precursor of the Qing dynasty

=== Others ===
- Jin (Korean state) (辰國), precursor of the Jinhan Confederation
- Balhae (698–713), originally known as Jin (震)

== Places ==
- Jin Prefecture (Shanxi) (晉州), a former Chinese prefecture centered on present-day Linfen, Shanxi
- Jin Prefecture (Shaanxi) (金州), a former Chinese prefecture centered on present-day Ankang, Shaanxi
- Jin Prefecture (Hunan) (锦州), a former Chinese prefecture centered on Luyang in present-day Hunan
- Shanxi, official abbreviation Jin (晋)
- Tianjin, official abbreviation Jin (津)

== Rivers ==
- Jin River (Bei River tributary) (锦江, Jǐn Jiāng), a tributary of the Bei River in Guangdong
- Jin River (Sichuan) (锦江, Jǐn Jiāng), a tributary of the Min River in Sichuan
- Jin River (Fujian) (晋江, Jìn Jiāng), a river in Quanzhou Municipality, Fujian
- Jin River (Xiang River tributary) (靳江, Jìn Jiāng), a tributary of the Xiang River in Hunan

== Surnames ==
- Jin (Chinese surname), various Chinese surnames
- Jin (Korean surname), various Korean surnames
- Jin clan, a noble family in Korean history

== Entertainment ==
- Jin (manga), a Japanese manga series by Motoka Murakami
  - Jin (TV series), a Japanese television adaptation of the manga
- "Jin, the Wind Master", an episode of Yu Yu Hakusho
- Jîn, a 2013 Turkish-German film
- Jin (film), a 2023 Bangladeshi film

=== People ===
- Jin (singer) (Kim Seok-jin, born 1992), South Korean singer of the boy band BTS
- Jin Akanishi (赤西 仁; born 1984), Japanese musician
- Jin Homura (born 1948), Japanese painter
- Jin Horikawa (堀川 仁; born 1962), Japanese voice actor
- Jin Maley, American actor
- Jin Tanaka (田中 仁; born 1976), Japanese screenwriter
- Jin Weiying (金维映; born 1904), Chinese teacher, revolutionary, trade unionist
- Jin Woodman (born 2009), Australian wheelchair tennis player
- Jin Yamanoi (山野井 仁; born 1962), Japanese voice actor
- Jinjin (Park Jin-woo, born 1996), South Korean singer of the boy group Astro
- MC Jin (born 1982), Hong Kong American rapper
- Jin (じん, born 1990), a Vocaloid producer
- Kentaro Jin, also known as Strange Catman, Internet celebrity in Australia and Japan

==== Fictional characters ====
- Jin Kazama, the protagonist of the Tekken video game series
- Jin-Soo Kwon, a character in Lost
- Jin, a character in the O-Parts Hunter series
- Jin, a character in Samurai Champloo media
- Jin, a character in YuYu Hakusho
- Jin Kariya, a character in the anime Bleach
- Jin Kirigiri, a character in Danganronpa
- Jin Kisaragi, a character in BlazBlue video games
- Jin Kyousuke, a character in Crush Gear Turbo
- Jin Shirato, a character in Persona 3
- Jin Uzuki, a character in Xenosaga
- Jin Lee, The father of Meilin Lee in Turning Red.
- Jin Ryu, a character in Beyblade
- Jin Kaien, a character in Grand Chase
- Jin, the protagonist of the Choushinsei Flashman
- Jin, an antagonist in Xenoblade Chronicles 2
- Jin Bubaigawa, also known as Twice, an antagonist in My Hero Academia
- Jin Saotome, main protagonist of Cyberbots: Full Metal Madness
- Jin Sakai, main protagonist of Ghost of Tsushima
- Jin Kuwana, main antagonist of Lost Judgment
- Jin Sagami (佐賀美陣), a supporting character in Ensemble Stars!
- Jin Cheng, a main character in Netflix's 3 Body Problem (TV series)
- Jin Kaidou, a character from Little Battlers Experience
- Jin Takayama, a character from Kamen Rider Amazons
- Jyn Erso, main protagonist of the 2016 film Rogue One
- Jin Kamurai (冠氷 尋), a character from Tokyo Debunker

== Sports ==
- Jin Akimoto (born 1971), Japanese mixed martial artist
- Jin Okubo (大久保 陣; born 1988), Japanese cyclist
- Jin Hanato (端戸 仁; born 1990), Japanese footballer
- Jin Watanabe (handball player) (渡部 仁; born 1990), Japanese handball player
- Jin Ueda (上田 仁; born 1991), Japanese table tennis player
- Jin Hiratsuka (平墳 迅; born 1999), Japanese footballer
- Jin Ikoma (生駒 仁; born 1999), Japanese footballer

== Other uses ==
- JIN, the code for Jinja Airport in Uganda
- Jin Air, a South Korean airline
- Jin language
- Jin (mass), the Chinese name for the catty, a traditional East Asian unit of weight
- Jin, a deadwood bonsai technique
- Jin (otter)
- Jinn (جِنّ), an Arabic word for supernatural beings anglicized as genies

== See also ==
- Chin (disambiguation)
- Gin (disambiguation)
- Jing (disambiguation)
- Jinhan confederacy (辰韓; 1st century BC – 4th century AD), also known as Qinhan
- Jinn (disambiguation)
- Jinzhou (disambiguation)
- Jinjiang (disambiguation)
- 晉 (disambiguation)
