= Yuping (disambiguation) =

Yuping Dong Autonomous County (玉屏侗族自治县), or Yuping County (玉屏县), is a county in Guangxi province.

Yuping may also refer to:

- Yuping, Pingjiang (余坪镇), a town in Pingjiang County, Hunan province

== People with the given name ==
- Dong Yuping (born 1963), Chinese athlete
- Jia Yuping (born 1986), Chinese cross-country skier
- Kuang Yuping, Chinese academic physicist
- Lei Yuping (born 1979), Chinese boxer
- Lin Yuping (born 1992), Chinese association football player
- Qian Yuping (born 1966), Chinese professional Go player
- Zhao Yuping, Chinese Paralympic athlete

== See also ==
- Yujing (disambiguation)
- Yu Pingbo
