= Jiuzhou (disambiguation) =

Nine Provinces (Chinese: 九州; pinyin: Jiǔ Zhōu) symbolically represents China.

Jiuzhou may also refer to the following places in China:

- Jiuzhou Port (Zhuhai), Guangdong
- Jiuzhou, Guangyang, Langfang, Hebei
- Jiuzhou, Cang County, Hebei
- Jiuzhou, Lingshan County, Guangxi
- Jiuzhou, Huangping County, Guizhou

== See also ==
- Jinzhou (disambiguation)
- Jiuzhouyang, Jiuzhou Channel
- Jiuzhou Street station, of the Hangzhou Metro
