= Jingyu =

Jingyu (Chinese: 靖宇; pinyin: Jìngyǔ), jing-yu, or variation, may refer to:

== Places ==
- Jingyu County (simplified Chinese: 靖宇县; traditional Chinese: 靖宇縣; pinyin: Jìngyǔ Xiàn; Jingyu County), in Jilin Province, China
- Jingyu, Jingyu County (simplified Chinese: 靖宇镇; traditional Chinese: 靖宇鎮; pinyin: Jìngyǔ Zhèn; Jingyu Town), county seat of Jingyu County
- Jingyu Subdistrict, Daowai District, Harbin, China (Chinese: 靖宇街道; pinyin: Jìngyǔ Jiēdào; Jingyu Subdistrict)

== People ==
- Yang Jingyu (simplified Chinese: 杨靖宇; traditional Chinese: 楊靖宇; pinyin: Yáng Jìngyǔ; 1905-1940), Chinese Communist general

== See also ==
- Jing (disambiguation)
- Yu (disambiguation)
- Yujing (disambiguation)
