= Katsumata =

Katsumata is a Japanese surname. People with the surname include:

- Isao Katsumata (勝俣 功, born 1937), Japanese golfer
- Kiyokazu Katsumata (勝又 清和, born 1969), Japanese shogi player
- Seiichi Katsumata (勝間田 清一, 1908–1989), Japanese politician and Soviet spy
- Shunma Katsumata (勝俣 瞬馬, born 1992), Japanese professional wrestler
- Susumu Katsumata (disambiguation), multiple people
- Tomoharu Katsumata (勝間田 具治, born 1938), Japanese film director
- Yoshinori Katsumata (勝又 慶典, born 1985), Japanese footballer
