= Homura =

Homura may refer to:

- Homura (moth), a genus of snout moths
- Homura (song) (炎), theme song of the movie Demon Slayer: Kimetsu no Yaiba the Movie: Mugen Train

== People with the given name ==
- Homura Kawamoto Japanese manga artist and writer.

== People with the surname ==
- Jin Homura (born 1948), painter in Japan

== Video games ==
- Homura (PlayStation 2 game) a PlayStation 2 video game released in 2005.

== Fictional characters ==
- Nagi Homura (炎 凪), a fictional character in the My Hime anime/manga series
- Homura Akemi (暁美 ほむら), a fictional character in the anime/manga Puella Magi Madoka Magica
- Homura Amanohokosaka (天ノ矛坂 焔), a NPC in the BlazBlue series
- Homura (ほむら), a fictional character in the Bleach anime
- Homura Mitokado (水戸門 ホムラ), a fictional character in the manga/anime Naruto
- Homura (焔群), one of the dragons in the manga/anime Flame of Recca
- Toushin Homura Taishi (焔), a fictional character in the manga series Saiyuki
- Homura (焔), a fictional character in the Senran Kagura series
- Homura Kōgetsu (ホムラ・コウゲツ), a fictional character in the manga Edens Zero

== See also ==
- Hōmura Uta, a 2005 album released by Mucc
