= Damn the weather =

Prohibition Era cocktail

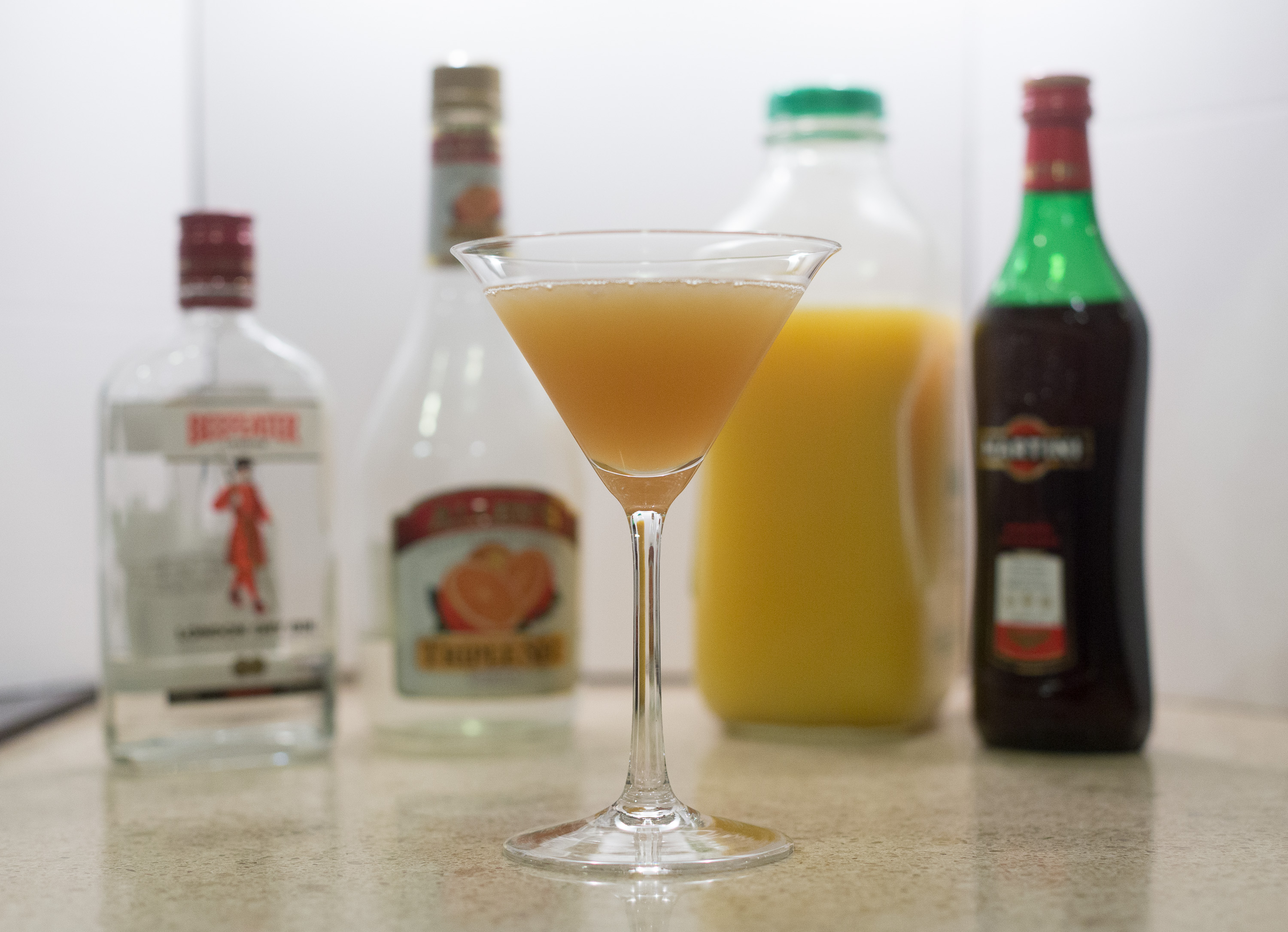
- Type: Cocktail
- Ingredients: 1 measure gin; 1/2 measure sweet vermouth; 1/2 measure orange juice; 1/4 measure orange curacao or triple sec
- Standard drinkware: Cocktail glass
- Standard garnish: Slice of orange
- Served: Straight up: chilled, without ice
- Preparation: Shake with ice and strain into a chilled large cocktail glass

A damn the weather (or damn-the-weather) is a Prohibition Era cocktail made with Gin, sweet vermouth, orange juice, and a sweetener (either Triple Sec or Curaçao). It is served shaken and chilled, often with a slice of orange or other citrus fruit.

== History ==
Like many prohibition-era cocktails, the damn the weather was conceived as a way to hide the scent and flavor of poor quality homemade spirits, in this case bathtub gin. The original recipe was included in Harry Craddock's 1930 The Savoy Cocktail Book. A bar/restaurant in Seattle takes its name from the drink.

== Variations ==
- The Despite the Weather cocktail is made with shochu, pisco, orange juice, lemon, passion fruit, and ginger syrup.
- The drink may be served over ice in a short glass.
- Grand Marnier or Cointreau may be substituted for the sweetener.
