= List of Yu Yu Hakusho episodes =

The logo for the English dub, released by Funimation

The episodes of the Japanese animated television series Yu Yu Hakusho (幽☆遊☆白書, YūYū Hakusho; lit. "Ghost Files" or "Poltergeist Report", romanized as Yu Yu HAKUSHO), part of the Yu Yu Hakusho media franchise are directed by Noriyuki Abe and produced by Fuji Television, Yomiko Advertising and Studio Pierrot. They are based on the YuYu Hakusho manga series by Yoshihiro Togashi, incorporating nineteen volumes of the source material over one hundred and twelve episodes. The series concentrates on the adventures of Yusuke Urameshi, who after his death becomes a Spirit Detective, the protector of the Living World against supernatural threats.

The series aired weekly from October 10, 1992, to January 7, 1995, on Fuji Television in Japan.

== Episode list ==
A note on the "season" nomenclature: The seasons that comprise the following list correspond to the box sets released in North America by Funimation. However, these "seasons" only correspond to story arcs, and not to the pattern in which the show actually aired in either Japan or the United States. In Japan, Yu Yu Hakusho was aired year-round continuously, with regular pre-emptions for sporting events and television specials taking place, not split into standard seasonal cycles. In the United States, the show did indeed have four seasons, but the TV Broadcast Seasons were different to the DVD/Blu-Ray Seasons. The TV Broadcast Seasons were as follows: Season One contained episodes 1~21, Season Two contained 22~53, Season Three contained 54~89, and Season Four contained 90~112. The DVD/Blu-Ray Seasons were divided up equally into 28 Episodes per set.

=== Season 1: Spirit Detective Saga (1992–93) ===
No.	Title	Directed by	Written by	Storyboard by	Original release date	English release date
1	"Surprised to be Dead"; Transliteration: "Shindara Odoroita!" (Japanese: 死んだらオドロいた)	Noriyuki Abe	Yoshiyuki Ōhashi	Noriyuki Abe	October 10, 1992	February 23, 2002
2	"Koenma Appears" (Koenma of the Spirit Realm! A Trial Towards Resurrection); Transliteration: "Reikai no Koenma! Fukkatsu e no Shiren" (Japanese: 霊界のコエンマ! 復活への試練)	Shigeru Ueda	Yoshiyuki Ōhashi	Akihiro Enomoto	October 17, 1992	March 2, 2002
3	"Kuwabara: A Promise Between Men" (Kuwabara in a Corner! A Man's Oath); Transliteration: "Oitsumerareta Kuwabara! Otoko no Chikai" (Japanese: 追いつめられた桑原! 男の誓い)	Kazunori Mizuno	Yoshiyuki Ōhashi	Kazunori Mizuno	October 24, 1992	March 9, 2002
4	"Requirements for Lovers" (Hot Flames! Ties of the Beloved); Transliteration: "Atsuki Honō! Koibito no Kizuna" (Japanese: 熱き炎! 恋人のきずな)	Akiyuki Shinbo	Sukehiro Tomita	Motosuke Takahashi	October 31, 1992	March 16, 2002
5	"Yusuke's Back" (Yusuke's Resurrection! A New Trial); Transliteration: "Yūsuke Fukkatsu! Aratanaru Shimei" (Japanese: 幽助復活! 新たなる使命)	Junya Koshiba	Katsuyuki Sumisawa	Junya Koshiba	November 7, 1992	March 23, 2002
6	"Three Monsters" (The Three Yokai! Hiei, Kurama, and Gouki); Transliteration: "Sanbiki no Yōkai! Hiei Kurama Gōki" (Japanese: 三匹の妖怪! 飛影·蔵馬·剛鬼)	Hitoyuki Matsui	Hiroshi Hashimoto	Hitoyuki Matsui	November 14, 1992	March 30, 2002
7	"Gouki and Kurama" (Kurama's Secret!? The Ties Between Mother and Son); Transliteration: "Kurama no Himitsu?! Haha To Ko no Kizuna" (Japanese: 蔵馬の秘密?! 母と子のきずな)	Akiyuki Shinbo	Yoshiyuki Ōhashi	Akiyuki Shinbo	November 21, 1992	April 6, 2002
8	"The Three Eyes of Hiei" (Keiko in Peril! Hiei, the Jagan Master); Transliteration: "Keiko Ayaushi! Jaganshi Hiei" (Japanese: 螢子あやうし! 邪眼師·飛影)	Junya Koshiba	Sukehiro Tomita	Takeshi Mori	November 28, 1992	April 13, 2002
9	"The Search Begins" (The Successor to Genkai! The Tournament Begins); Transliteration: "Genkai no Keishōsha Tournament Kaishi" (Japanese: 幻海の継承者トーナメント開始)	Junya Koshiba	Katsuyuki Sumisawa	Takeshi Mori	December 5, 1992	April 20, 2002
10	"Kuwabara's Spirit Sword" (Death Battle in the Dark! Kuwabara's Reiki Sword); Transliteration: "Kurayami no Shitō! Kuwabara Reiki no Ken" (Japanese: 暗闇の死闘! 桑原·霊気の剣)	Kazunori Mizuno	Hiroshi Hashimoto	Kazunori Mizuno	December 12, 1992	April 27, 2002
11	"Hard Fights for Yusuke" (Yusuke's Hard Battle! A Bruised and Bloody Counterattack); Transliteration: "Yūsuke Kurusen! Kizudarake Hangeki" (Japanese: 幽助苦戦! 傷だらけの反撃!!)	Hitoyuki Matsui	Yoshiyuki Ōhashi	Hitoyuki Matsui	December 19, 1992	May 4, 2002
12	"Rando Rises, Kuwabara Falls" (Rando Appears! Kuwabara's Grievous Defeat); Transliteration: "Randō Arawaru! Kuwabara Munen no Haiboku" (Japanese: 乱童あらわる! 桑原無念の敗北)	Akiyuki Shinbo	Sukehiro Tomita	Motosuke Takahashi	December 26, 1992	May 11, 2002
13	"Yusuke vs. Rando: 99 Attacks" (Yusuke vs. Rando, Sorcery Thrown Into Chaos!!); Transliteration: "Yūsuke vs. Randō Midariretobu Yōjitsu" (Japanese: 幽助VS乱童 乱れとぶ妖術!!)	Junya Koshiba	Katsuyuki Sumisawa	Junya Koshiba	January 9, 1993	May 18, 2002
14	"The Beasts of Maze Castle" (The Four Holy Beasts in the Labyrinthine Castle! A Challenge to the Spiritual Realm); Transliteration: "Meikyū Shiro no Shiseijū! Reikai e no Chōsen" (Japanese: 迷宮城の四聖獣! 霊界への挑戦)	Shigeru Ueda	Hiroshi Hashimoto	Akihiro Enomoto	January 16, 1993	May 25, 2002
15	"Genbu, the Stone Beast" (The Beautiful Dance of the Rose! The Elegant Kurama); Transliteration: "Utsukushiki Bara no Mai! Karei Naru Kurama" (Japanese: 美しきバラの舞! 華麗なる蔵馬)	Kazunori Mizuno	Yoshiyuki Ōhashi	Noriyuki Abe	January 23, 1993	June 1, 2002
16	"Byakko, the White Tiger" (Grow, Rei-ken! Kuwabara — A Man's Fight); Transliteration: "Tobi Yo Reiken! Kuwabara Otoko no Shōbu" (Japanese: 伸びよ霊剣! 桑原·男の勝負)	Akiyuki Shinbo	Sukehiro Tomita	Akiyuki Shinbo	January 30, 1993	June 8, 2002
17	"Byakko's Lair" (Byakko's Hellish Roar); Transliteration: "Byakko Jigoku no Otakebi" (Japanese: 白虎·地獄の雄叫び)	Junya Koshiba	Katsuyuki Sumisawa	Takeshi Mori	February 6, 1993	June 15, 2002
18	"Seiryu, the Blue Dragon" (Hiei Comes Forward to Battle! A Slashing Sword); Transliteration: "Hiei Shusen! Kirisaku Ken" (Japanese: 飛影出戦! 切り裂く剣)	Hitoyuki Matsui	Hiroshi Hashimoto	Hitoyuki Matsui	February 13, 1993	June 22, 2002
19	"Suzaku, Leader of the Beasts" (The Last of the Four Holy Beasts, Suzaku!); Transliteration: "Saigo no Shiseijū Suzaku" (Japanese: 最後の四聖獣·朱雀!)	Shigeru Ueda	Yoshiyuki Ōhashi	Akihiro Enomoto	February 20, 1993	June 29, 2002
20	"Seven Ways to Die" (Secret Techniques Clash! The Seven Suzaku); Transliteration: "Okugi Gekitotsu! Shichi Nin no Suzaku" (Japanese: 奥義激突! 七人の朱雀)	Kazunori Mizuno	Sukehiro Tomita	Kazunori Mizuno	February 27, 1993	July 6, 2002
21	"Yusuke's Sacrifice" (Yusuke's Life or Death Counterattack); Transliteration: "Yūsuke Inochi o Kaketa Hangeki" (Japanese: 幽助·命を賭けた反撃)	Akiyuki Shinbo	Katsuyuki Sumisawa	Motosuke Takahashi	March 6, 1993	July 6, 2002
22	"Lamenting Beauty" (A Sorrowful Young Beauty — Yukina); Transliteration: "Kanashimi no Bishōjo Yukina" (Japanese: 悲しみの美少女·雪菜)	Haruo Nakayama	Hiroshi Hashimoto	Takeshi Mori	March 13, 1993	April 3, 2003
23	"The Toguro Brothers Gang" (Envoys of Darkness! The Toguro Brothers); Transliteration: "Yami no Shisha! Toguro Kyōdai" (Japanese: 闇の使者! 戸愚呂兄弟)	Noriyuki Abe	Yoshiyuki Ōhashi	Noriyuki Abe	March 20, 1993	April 4, 2003
24	"The Deadly Triad" (Terrifyingly Mighty Foes! The Sankishu); Transliteration: "Osoroshiki Kyōteki! San Kishū" (Japanese: 恐ろしき強敵! 三鬼衆)	Akiyuki Shinbo	Sukehiro Tomita	Akiyuki Shinbo	March 27, 1993	April 5, 2003
25	"Kuwabara's Fight of Love" (Burn, Kuwabara! The Underlying Power of Love); Transliteration: "Moero Kuwabara! Ai no Sokojikara" (Japanese: 燃えろ桑原! 愛の底力)	Hitoyuki Matsui	Katsuyuki Sumisawa	Hitoyuki Matsui	April 10, 1993	April 6, 2003

=== Season 2: Dark Tournament Saga (1993–94) ===
No.	Title	Directed by	Written by	Storyboard by	Original release date	English release date
26	"Toguro Returns" (Invitees To The Dark Tournament); Transliteration: "Ankoku Bujutsukai e no Shōtaisha" (Japanese: 暗黒武術会への招待者)	Shigeru Ueda	Hiroshi Hashimoto	Akihiro Enomoto	April 17, 1993	April 7, 2003
27	"The Dark Tournament Begins" (Departure of Death! To The Island of Hell); Transliteration: "Shi no Funede! Jigoku no Shima e" (Japanese: 死の船出! 地獄の島へ)	Junya Koshiba	Yoshiyuki Ōhashi	Junya Koshiba	April 24, 1993	April 10, 2003
28	"First Fight" (The Little Mighty Foe! Rinku's Secret Technique); Transliteration: "Chiisana Kyōteki! Rinku no Higi" (Japanese: 小さな強敵! 鈴駒の秘技)	Kazunori Mizuno	Sukehiro Tomita	Motosuke Takahashi	May 1, 1993	April 11, 2003
29	"Flowers of Blood" (Kurama Makes Blood Flowers Blossom); Transliteration: "Chi no Hana o Sakasu Kurama!" (Japanese: 血の花を咲かす蔵馬!)	Haruo Nakayama	Katsuyuki Sumisawa	Hitoyuki Matsui	May 8, 1993	April 12, 2003
30	"Dragon of the Darkness Flame" (The Unfinished Secret Technique — Ensatsu Kokuryuha); Transliteration: "Mikan no Ougi Ensatsu Kokuryūha" (Japanese: 未完の奥義·炎殺黒龍波)	Akiyuki Shinbo	Hiroshi Hashimoto	Akiyuki Shinbo	May 15, 1993	April 13, 2003
31	"Stumbling Warrior" (The Drunken Warrior! Chu's Sui-ken); Transliteration: "Yoidore Senshi! Chū no Suiken" (Japanese: よいどれ戦士! 酎の酔拳)	Hitoyuki Matsui	Yoshiyuki Ōhashi	Hitoyuki Matsui	May 22, 1993	April 14, 2003
32	"Knife Edge Death-Match"; Transliteration: "Naifu Ejji Desu Matchi" (Japanese: ナイフエッジデスマッチ)	Kazunori Mizuno	Kazunori Mizuno	Yoshiyuki Ōhashi	May 29, 1993	April 17, 2003
33	"A Day in Waiting" (Clash! The Best 8 are Decided); Transliteration: "Gekitotsu! Best 8 Desorō" (Japanese: 激突! ベスト8出そろう)	Shigeru Ueda	Sukehiro Tomita	Akihiro Enomoto	June 5, 1993	April 18, 2003
34	"Percentage of Victory" (A Desperate Battle, With a 0.05% Chance of Winning); Transliteration: "Shōritsu Rei Ten Rei Go Pāsento no Shitō" (Japanese: 勝率0.05%の死闘!)	Junya Koshiba	Katsuyuki Sumisawa	Junya Koshiba	June 12, 1993	April 19, 2003
35	"Glimpse Beneath the Mask" (The Identity of Mask?! A Beautiful Warrior); Transliteration: "Fukumen no Shōtai?! Utsukushiki Senshi" (Japanese: 覆面の正体?! 美しき戦士)	Akiyuki Shinbo	Hiroshi Hashimoto	Akiyuki Shinbo	June 19, 1993	April 20, 2003
36	"Ambition Destroyed: A Trial by Light" (Ambition Crushed! A Baptism by Light); Transliteration: "Yabō o Funsai! Hikari no Senrei" (Japanese: 野望を粉砕! 光りの洗礼)	Kazuhiro Ozawa	Yoshiyuki Ōhashi	Akihiro Enomoto	June 26, 1993	April 21, 2003
37	"Master of Disguise" (Stealthy Figures of Darkness, The Mashotsukai Team); Transliteration: "Yami no Shinobi Mashōtsukai Team" (Japanese: 闇の忍·魔性使いチーム)	Akiyuki Shinbo	Sukehiro Tomita	Motosuke Takahashi	July 3, 1993	April 24, 2003
38	"Kurama's Stand" (A Desperate Kurama! Bodypaint of Death); Transliteration: "Kurama Muzan! Shi no Keshō" (Japanese: 蔵馬無惨! 死の化粧)	Hitoyuki Matsui	Katsuyuki Sumisawa	Hitoyuki Matsui	July 10, 1993	April 25, 2003
39	"Crushing Revenge" (Annihilation! Yusuke's Iron Fist of Fury); Transliteration: "Funsai! Yūsuke Ikari no Tekken" (Japanese: 粉砕! 幽助怒りの鉄拳)	Kazunori Mizuno	Hiroshi Hashimoto	Kazunori Mizuno	July 17, 1993	April 26, 2003
40	"Jin, the Wind Master" (Jin, the Wind Tamer! A Stormy Air Battle); Transliteration: "Kazetsukai Jin! Arashi no Kuchūsen" (Japanese: 風使い陣! 嵐の空中戦)	Junya Koshiba	Yoshiyuki Ōhashi	Junya Koshiba	July 24, 1993	April 27, 2003
41	"Reverse Decisions" (Reikodan! An Unexpected Conclusion?!); Transliteration: "Reikōdan! Igai Na Ketchaku?!" (Japanese: 霊光弾! 意外な決着?!)	Akiyuki Shinbo	Sukehiro Tomita	Akiyuki Shinbo	July 31, 1993	April 28, 2003
42	"A Matter of Love and Death" (A Desperate Kuwabara! The Charge of Love); Transliteration: "Kesshi no Kuwabara! Ai no Totsugeki" (Japanese: 決死の桑原! 愛の突撃)	Masami Shimoda	Katsuyuki Sumisawa	Noriyuki Abe	August 7, 1993	May 1, 2003
43	"The Masked Fighter Revealed" (The Masked Warrior's Stern Face); Transliteration: "Fukumen Senshi no Kubishiki Sugao" (Japanese: 覆面戦士の厳しき素顔)	Shigeru Ueda	Hiroshi Hashimoto	Shigeru Ueda	August 14, 1993	May 2, 2003
44	"Yusuke's Final Test" (The Greatest Trial from Genkai); Transliteration: "Genkai Kara no Saidai no Shiren" (Japanese: 幻海からの最大の試練)	Hitoyuki Matsui	Yoshiyuki Ōhashi	Hitoyuki Matsui	August 21, 1993	May 3, 2003
45	"Hiei Battles On" (Hiei Battles Consecutively! Shoot Your Kokuryuha!); Transliteration: "Hiei Rensen! Ute Kokuryūha!" (Japanese: 飛影連戦! 撃て黒龍波!)	Akiyuki Shinbo	Sukehiro Tomita	Motosuke Takahashi	August 28, 1993	May 4, 2003
46	"Many Faces, Many Forms" (Tremble! Kuromomotaro's Transformation); Transliteration: "Senritsu! Kuromomotarō no Henshin" (Japanese: 戦慄! 黒桃太郎の変身)	Junya Koshiba	Katsuyuki Sumisawa	Junya Koshiba	September 4, 1993	May 5, 2003
47	"Legendary Bandit: Yoko Kurama" (The Legendary Thief! Yoko Kurama); Transliteration: "Densetsu no Tōsoku! Yōko Kurama" (Japanese: 伝説の盗賊! 妖狐·蔵馬)	Akiyuki Shinbo	Hiroshi Hashimoto	Akiyuki Shinbo	September 11, 1993	May 8, 2003
48	"The Cape of No Return" (Item of Darkness: The Mantle of Death); Transliteration: "Yami Item Shide no Hagoromo" (Japanese: 闇アイテム·死出の羽衣)	Masami Shimoda	Yoshiyuki Ōhashi	Masami Shimoda	September 18, 1993	May 9, 2003
49	"Genkai's Strength" (Remaining Power! Genkai's Life or Death Battle); Transliteration: "Nokosareta Chikara! Genkai no Shitō" (Japanese: 残された力! 幻海の死闘)	Shigeru Ueda	Sukehiro Tomita	Akihiro Enomoto	September 25, 1993	May 10, 2003
50	"Suzuka's Challenge" (Demon Battler Suzuki's Challenge!); Transliteration: "Matōka Suzuki no Chōsen" (Japanese: 魔闘家·鈴木の挑戦!)	Junya Koshiba	Katsuyuki Sumisawa	Junya Koshiba	October 2, 1993	May 11, 2003
51	"Arch-Rivals" (Confrontation of Destiny! The Shadow of Toguro); Transliteration: "Shukumei no Taiketsu! Toguro no Kage" (Japanese: 宿命の対決! 戸愚呂の影)	Hitoyuki Matsui	Hiroshi Hashimoto	Hitoyuki Matsui	October 9, 1993	May 12, 2003
52	"The Death of Genkai" (Genkai Falls! Settled After 50 Years); Transliteration: "Genkai Chiru! 50 Nen Me no Ketchaku" (Japanese: 幻海散る! 50年目の決着)	Akiyuki Shinbo	Yoshiyuki Ōhashi	Akiyuki Shinbo	October 16, 1993	May 15, 2003
53	"Overcoming Grief" (Before the Storm! Overcoming Sorrow); Transliteration: "Arashi no Mae! Kanashimi o Koete" (Japanese: 嵐の前! 悲しみを越えて)	Kazunori Mizuno	Sukehiro Tomita	Motosuke Takahashi	October 23, 1993	May 16, 2003
54	"The Beginning of the End" (The Turbulent Final Round Begins!); Transliteration: "Haran no Kesshō Sen Kaishi!" (Japanese: 波瀾の決勝戦開始!)	Junya Koshiba	Katsuyuki Sumisawa	Shinsaku Kouzuma	October 30, 1993	April 24, 2004
55	"The Beast Within" (Explosion! The Yoko Awakened); Transliteration: "Bakuretsu! Mezameta Yōko" (Japanese: 爆烈! 目覚めた妖狐)	Masami Shimoda	Katsuyuki Sumisawa	Masami Shimoda	November 6, 1993	May 8, 2004
56	"Yoko's Magic" (The Desperate Kurama! A Final Measure); Transliteration: "Kesshi no Kurama! Saigo no Shudan" (Japanese: 決死の蔵馬! 最後の手段)	Shigeru Ueda	Yoshiyuki Ōhashi	Akihiro Enomoto	November 13, 1993	May 15, 2004
57	"Beneath Bui's Armor" (Intimidation! Bui Removes his Armor); Transliteration: "Kyōi! Yoroi o Hazushita Bui" (Japanese: 脅威! 鎧を外した武威)	Junya Koshiba	Katsuyuki Sumisawa	Junya Koshiba	November 20, 1993	May 22, 2004
58	"Wielder of the Dragon" (The Ultimate Secret Technique! Roar of the Kokuryuha); Transliteration: "Kyūkyoku Ougi! Hoero Kokuryūha" (Japanese: 究極奥義! ほえろ黒龍波)	Akiyuki Shinbo	Katsuyuki Sumisawa	Akiyuki Shinbo	November 27, 1993	May 29, 2004
59	"The Shadow of Elder Toguro" (The Eerie Shadow of Toguro the Elder); Transliteration: "Toguro Ani no Bukimi na Kage" (Japanese: 戸愚呂兄の不気味な影)	Hitoyuki Matsui	Hiroshi Hashimomto	Hitoyuki Matsui	December 4, 1993	June 5, 2004
60	"Sakyo's Proposal" (Explosion of Anger! Kuwabara's Counterattack); Transliteration: "Ikari Bakuhatsu! Kuwabara no Hangeki" (Japanese: 怒り爆発! 桑原の反撃)	Haruo Nakayama	Sukehiro Tomita	Takeshi Mori	December 11, 1993	June 12, 2004
61	"Yusuke vs. Toguro" (Confrontation of Destiny! The Tempestuous Battle of Captains Commences); Transliteration: "Shukumei no Taiketsu! Arashi no Taishōsen Kaishi" (Japanese: 宿命の対決! 嵐の大将戦開始)	Akiyuki Shinbo	Yoshiyuki Ōhashi	Motosuke Takahashi	December 18, 1993	June 19, 2004
62	"Toguro's Full Power" (Toguro's 100 Percent Terror!); Transliteration: "Toguro Hyaku Pāsento no Kyōfu!" (Japanese: 戸愚呂100%の恐怖!)	Shigeru Ueda	Katsuyuki Sumisawa	Akihiro Enomoto	January 8, 1994	June 26, 2004
63	"Yusuke's Despair" (Yusuke! A Trial to the Limits of Sorrow); Transliteration: "Yūsuke! Genkai e no Kanashii Shiren" (Japanese: 幽助! 限界への悲しい試練)	Masami Shimoda	Hiroshi Hashimoto	Masami Shimoda	January 15, 1994	July 3, 2004
64	"Toguro's Desire" (Deathbattle Concluded! A Final Full Power); Transliteration: "Shitō Ketchaku! Saigo no Furu Pawā" (Japanese: 死闘決着! 最後のフルパワー)	Junya Koshiba	Sukehiro Tomita	Junya Koshiba	January 22, 1994	July 10, 2004
65	"Out With a Bang" (The Scheme Vanishes, Together With the Stadium); Transliteration: "Tōgijō to Tomoni Kieru Yabō" (Japanese: 闘技場と共に消える野望)	Hitoyuki Matsui	Yoshiyuki Ōhashi	Hitoyuki Matsui	January 29, 1994	July 17, 2004
66	"Toguro's Wish" (Toguro's Atonement — His Greatest Desire); Transliteration: "Toguro no Tsugunai. Ichiban no Nozomi" (Japanese: 戸愚呂の償い・一番の望み)	Akiyuki Shinbo	Yoshiyuki Ōhashi	Akiyuki Shinbo	February 5, 1994	July 24, 2004

=== Season 3: Chapter Black Saga (1994) ===
No.	Title	Directed by	Written by	Storyboard by	Original release date	English release date
67	"Return to Living World" (A New Prologue); Transliteration: "Aratanaru Purorōgu" (Japanese: 新たなるプロローグ)	Haruo Nakayama	Katsuyuki Sumisawa	Masami Shimoda	February 12, 1994	July 31, 2004
68	"Setting the Trap" (The Traps Lurking Inside Yojigen Mansion); Transliteration: "Yon Jigen Yashiki ni Hisomu Wana" (Japanese: 四次元屋敷にひそむ罠)	Yorifusa Yamaguchi	Sukehiro Tomita	Takeshi Mori	February 19, 1994	August 7, 2004
69	"The Power of Taboo" (The Power of Taboo! Kurama's Intellect); Transliteration: "Kinku no Pawā! Kurama no Zunō" (Japanese: 禁句のパワー! 蔵馬の頭脳)	Kazunori Mizuno	Yoshiyuki Ōhashi	Motosuke Takahashi	February 26, 1994	August 14, 2004
70	"Genkai's Ruse" (The Terrifying Truth! A New Mystery); Transliteration: "Osorubeki Shinjitsu! Arata na Nazo" (Japanese: 恐るべき真実! 新たな謎)	Shigeru Ueda	Katsuyuki Sumisawa	Akihiro Enomoto	March 5, 1994	August 21, 2004
71	"The Tunnel" (The Coming Terror! The Gateway To The Demon World!); Transliteration: "Semari Kuru Kyōfu! Makai no Tobira" (Japanese: 迫り来る恐怖! 魔界の扉)	Masami Shimoda	Hiroshi Hashimoto	Masami Shimoda	March 12, 1994	August 28, 2004
72	"The Reader" (Envoys of the Demon Realm! Seven Enemies); Transliteration: "Makai no Shisha! Shichinin no Teki" (Japanese: 魔界の使者! 七人の敵)	Junya Koshiba	Sukehiro Tomita	Junya Koshiba	March 19, 1994	September 4, 2004
73	"The Doctor's Disease" (The Stalking, Demonic Hand of the Doctor); Transliteration: "Shinobiyoru Dokutā no Ma no Te" (Japanese: 忍び寄るドクターの魔の手)	Hitoyuki Matsui	Yoshiyuki Ōhashi	Hitoyuki Matsui	March 26, 1994	September 11, 2004
74	"Sleep, Doctor, Sleep" (Bring Down the Territory!!); Transliteration: "Teritorī o Uchi Yabure!!" (Japanese: テリトリーを打ちやぶれ!!)	Akiyuki Shinbo	Katsuyuki Sumisawa	Akiyuki Shinbo	April 2, 1994	September 18, 2004
75	"Caught in the Rain" (Seaman — A Trap Lurking in the Rain); Transliteration: "Shīman. Ame ni Hisomu Wana" (Japanese: シーマン・雨に潜む罠)	Haruo Nakayama	Hiroshi Hashimoto	Shigeru Ueda	April 9, 1994	September 25, 2004
76	"Kuwabara: Awakening" (Kuwabara Restored?! A Power Awakened); Transliteration: "Kuwabara Fukkatsu?! Mezameta Chikara" (Japanese: 桑原復活?! 目覚めた力)	Yorifusa Yamaguchi	Sukehiro Tomita	Yorifusa Yamaguchi	April 16, 1994	October 2, 2004
77	"Sensui's Fall" (The Dark Past of the Spirit Realm Detective); Transliteration: "Reikai Tantei no Kuroi Kako" (Japanese: 霊界探偵の黒い過去)	Shigeru Ueda	Yoshiyuki Ōhashi	Akihiro Enomomto	April 23, 1994	October 9, 2004
78	"Divide and Conquer" (Charge! Dark Angel); Transliteration: "Shutsugeki! Dāku Enjeru" (Japanese: 出撃! ダークエンジェル)	Masami Shimomda	Katsuyuki Sumisawa	Masami Shimoda	April 30, 1994	October 16, 2004
79	"The Human Race" (Yusuke's Mad Dash! Save Kuwabara!); Transliteration: "Yūsuke Gekisō! Kuwabara o Sukue!" (Japanese: 幽助激走! 桑原を救え!)	Kazunori Mizuno	Hiroshi Hashimoto	Junya Koshiba	May 7, 1994	October 23, 2004
80	"Moving Target" (Hagiri's Targets! Death Crest Cross Spots); Transliteration: "Hagiri no Hyōteki! Shimonjūjihan" (Japanese: 刃霧の標的! 死紋十字斑)	Kazunori Mizuno	Sukehiro Tomita	Motosuke Takahashi	May 14, 1994	October 30, 2004
81	"Let the Games Begin" (The Game World Inside the Cave); Transliteration: "Dōkutsu no Naka no Gēmu Wārudo" (Japanese: 洞窟の中のゲームワールド)	Hitoyuki Matsui	Yoshiyuki Ōhashi	Hitoyuki Matsui	May 21, 1994	November 6, 2004
82	"If You Could Play Forever" (Gamemaster's Fearsome Aptitude); Transliteration: "Gēmu Masutā Kyōi no Jitsuryoku" (Japanese: ゲームマスター脅威の実力)	Akiyuki Shinbo	Katsuyuki Sumisawa	Akiyuki Shinbo	May 28, 1994	November 13, 2004
83	"Game Over" (The Remaining Measure! Kurama's Resolve); Transliteration: "Nokosareta Shudan! Kurama no Ketsudan" (Japanese: 残された手段! 蔵馬の決断)	Haruo Nakayama	Hiroshi Hashimoto	Shigeru Ueda	June 4, 1994	November 20, 2004
84	"Kurama's Anger, Gourmet's Guest" (Kurama's Fury! Who is That, Really?!); Transliteration: "Kurama no Ikari! Shōtai wa Dare da?!" (Japanese: 蔵馬の怒り! 正体は誰だ?!)	Shigeru Ueda	Sukehiro Tomita	Akihiro Enomoto	June 11, 1994	November 27, 2004
85	"Spirit Detective Showdown" (Spirit Realm Detectives — A fated One-on-One Battle); Transliteration: "Reikai Tantei. Shukumei no Ikkiuchi" (Japanese: 霊界探偵・宿命の一騎討ち)	Kazunori Mizuno	Yoshiyuki Ōhashi	Junya Koshiba	June 18, 1994	December 4, 2004
86	"The Difference Maker" (Yusuke's Tough Battle! A Decisive Difference); Transliteration: "Yūsuke Kusen! Ketteiteki na Sa" (Japanese: 幽助苦戦! 決定的な差)	Masami Shimoda	Katsuyuki Sumisawa	Masami Shimoda	June 25, 1994	December 11, 2004
87	"Power Between the Teeth" (Koenma — Primed With The Mafukan!); Transliteration: "Koenma. Kakugo no Mafūkan!" (Japanese: コエンマ・覚悟の魔封環!)	Kazunori Mizuno	Hiroshi Hashimoto	Motosuke Takahashi	July 2, 1994	December 18, 2004
88	"The True Face of Sensui" (Sensui — Sacred Light Energy Unleashed!); Transliteration: "Sensui. Tokihanatareta Seikōki" (Japanese: 仙水・解き放たれた聖光気)	Hitoyuki Matsui	Sukehiro Tomita	Junya Koshiba	July 9, 1994	January 8, 2005
89	"Death of a Spirit Detective" (Foreboding! When Everything Comes to a Halt); Transliteration: "Yokan! Subete ga Tomaru Toki" (Japanese: 予感! 全てが止まる時)	Noriyuki Abe	Yoshiyuki Ōhashi	Akiyuki Shinbo	July 16, 1994	January 15, 2005
90	"Attempting Revenge" (Carrying On Their Friend's Will!); Transliteration: "Tomo no Ishi o Tsuge!" (Japanese: 友の意志を継げ!)	Haruo Nakayama	Katsuyuki Sumisawa	Shigeru Ueda	July 23, 1994	October 29, 2005
91	"Waking the Lost" (A Time of Awakening! The Battle Commences Again); Transliteration: "Kakusei no Toki! Batoru Futatabi" (Japanese: 覚醒の時! バトル再び)	Shigeru Ueda	Hiroshi Hashimoto	Akihiro Enomoto	July 30, 1994	November 5, 2005
92	"The Proof" (The Ultimate Battle! Proof of Demon Kinship); Transliteration: "Kyūkyoku no Tatakai! Mazoku no Akashi" (Japanese: 究極の戦い! 魔族の証)	Masami Shimoda	Yoshiyuki Ōhashi	Masami Shimoda	August 6, 1994	November 12, 2005
93	"Sensui's End" (A Conclusion! Deathbattle in the Demon Realm); Transliteration: "Ketchaku! Makai no Shitō!" (Japanese: 決着! 魔界の死闘!)	Junya Koshiba	Yoshiyuki Ōhashi	Junya Koshiba	August 13, 1994	November 19, 2005
94	"Topside" (Epilogue! Towards Tomorrow!); Transliteration: "Epirōgu! Ashita e!" (Japanese: エピローグ! 明日へ!)	Hitoyuki Matsui	Sukehiro Tomita	Hitoyuki Matsui	August 20, 1994	November 26, 2005

=== Season 4: Three Kings Saga (1994–95) ===
No.	Title	Directed by	Written by	Storyboard by	Original release date	English release date
95	"Yusuke's Destiny" (Yusuke's Destiny — Footsteps of Danger); Transliteration: "Yūsuke no Unmei. Kiken no Ashioto" (Japanese: 幽助の運命・危険の足音)	Akiyuki Shinbo	Katsuyuki Sumisawa	Motosuke Takahashi	August 27, 1994	December 3, 2005
96	"Three Strangers, Three Kings" (Visitors of Darkness — The Mystery Deepens); Transliteration: "Yami no Hōmonsha. Fukamaru Nazo" (Japanese: 闇の訪問者・深まる謎)	Haruo Nakayama	Yoshiyuki Ōhashi	Shigeru Ueda	September 3, 1994	December 10, 2005
97	"Departing Living World" (Parting — Our Respective Departures); Transliteration: "Wakare. Sorezore no Tabidachi" (Japanese: 別れ・それぞれの旅立ち)	Junya Koshiba	Sukehiro Tomita	Kazunori Mizuno	September 10, 1994	December 17, 2005
98	"Return to Demon World" (To the Demon Realm! A Meeting with the Father); Transliteration: "Makai e! Chichi to no Taimen" (Japanese: 魔界へ! 父との対面)	Shigeru Ueda	Hiroshi Hashimoto	Akihiro Enomoto	September 17, 1994	December 24, 2005
99	"Haunted by the Past" (Unforgettable Memories! A Time of Birth); Transliteration: "Wasure e nu Kioku. Tanjō no Toki" (Japanese: 忘れ得ぬ記憶・誕生の時)	Masami Shimoda	Katsuyuki Sumisawa	Masami Shimoda	September 24, 1994	December 31, 2005
100	"The Secret of the Jagan" (The Secrets of the Jagan Revealed); Transliteration: "Akasareru Jagan no Himitsu" (Japanese: 明かされる邪眼の秘密)	Junya Koshiba	Yoshiyuki Ōhashi	Junya Koshiba	October 1, 1994	January 7, 2006
101	"Reunion of the Bandits" (Demon Realm Thieves — A Thousand-Year Reunion); Transliteration: "Makai Tōzoku. Sennen me no Saikai" (Japanese: 魔界盗賊・千年目の再会)	Hitoyuki Matsui	Hiroshi Hashimoto	Hitoyuki Matsui	October 15, 1994	January 14, 2006
102	"Torn Between Identities" (Yoko Transformation! A Creeping Bloodlust); Transliteration: "Yōko Henka! Shinobiyoru Satsui" (Japanese: 妖狐変化! 忍び寄る殺意)	Junya Koshiba	Sukehiro Tomita	Motosuke Takahashi	October 22, 1994	January 21, 2006
103	"Inheritance" (A Father's Last Words — Memories of a Distant Day); Transliteration: "Chichi no Yuigon. Tōi Hi no Omoi" (Japanese: 父の遺言・遠い日の想い)	Haruo Nakayama	Katsuyuki Sumisawa	Shigeru Ueda	October 29, 1994	January 28, 2006
104	"Every Demon for Himself" (An Unexpected Proposal — A Change in the Demon Realm); Transliteration: "Igai na Teian. Makai no Hendō" (Japanese: 意外な提案・魔界の変動)	Shigeru Ueda	Yoshiyuki Ōhashi	Akihiro Enomoto	November 5, 1994	February 4, 2006
105	"The Preliminaries" (Great Battle in the Demon Realm — The Preliminaries Commence!); Transliteration: "Makai Taisen. Yosen Kaishi!" (Japanese: 魔界大戦・予選開始!)	Masami Shimoda	Sukehiro Tomita	Masami Shimoda	November 12, 1994	February 11, 2006
106	"The Battle of Father and Son" (Father and Son Battle! Yomi and Shura); Transliteration: "Tatakau Oyako! Yomi to Shura" (Japanese: 闘う親子! 黄泉と修羅)	Junya Koshiba	Katsuyuki Sumisawa	Junya Koshiba	November 19, 1994	February 18, 2006
107	"The Demon World Tournament Begins" (Fierce Fighting! Men Fighting for their Dreams); Transliteration: "Gekitō! Yume ni Kaketa Otoko Tachi" (Japanese: 激闘! 夢に賭けた男たち)	Hitoyuki Matsui	Katsuyuki Sumisawa	Hitoyuki Matsui	November 26, 1994	February 25, 2006
108	"Farewell, Kurama" (Kurama, A Break with the Past); Transliteration: "Kurama, Kako to no Ketsubetsu" (Japanese: 蔵馬, 過去との決別)	Masami Shimoda	Sukehiro Tomita	Noriyuki Abe	December 3, 1994	March 4, 2006
109	"Love and War" (Showdown! Hiei and Mukuro); Transliteration: "Taiketsu! Hiei to Mukuro" (Japanese: 対決! 飛影とムクロ)	Akiyuki Shinbo	Yoshiyuki Ōhashi	Motosuke Takahashi	December 10, 1994	March 11, 2006
110	"A Reason to Fight" (My Power — This is My All!); Transliteration: "Ore no Chikara. Kore ga Subete da!" (Japanese: 俺の力・これが全てだ!)	Shigeru Ueda	Hiroshi Hashimoto	Akihiro Enomoto	December 17, 1994	March 18, 2006
111	"Closure" (Concluded! The End of the Conflict); Transliteration: "Ketchaku! Gekitō no Hate Ni" (Japanese: 決着! 激闘の果てに)	Masami Shimoda	Yoshiyuki Ōhashi	Masami Shimoda	December 24, 1994	March 25, 2006
112	"To the Future" (Forever YuYu Hakusho!); Transliteration: "Fōebā! YūYūHakusho" (Japanese: フォーエバー!幽遊白書)	Junya Koshiba	Yoshiyuki Ōhashi	Junya Koshiba	January 7, 1995	April 1, 2006
