= Later Jin =

Later Jin may refer to two states in imperial China:

- Later Jin (Five Dynasties) (後晉; 936–947), one of the Five Dynasties
- Later Jin (1616–1636) (後金; 1616–1636), precursor to the Qing dynasty

== See also ==
- Jin (disambiguation), which lists other states named Jin
