= 晉 =

晉 or 晋, meaning 'advance', may refer to:

== States and places ==
- Jin (Chinese state) (晉國), major state of the Zhou dynasty, existing from the 11th century BC to 376 BC
- Jin dynasty (266–420) (晉朝), also known as Liang Jin and Sima Jin
- Jin (Later Tang precursor) (晉國; 907–923), Five Dynasties and Ten Kingdoms period
- Later Jin (Five Dynasties) (後晉; 936–947), Five Dynasties and Ten Kingdoms period
- Jin Prefecture (Shanxi) (晉州), a former Chinese prefecture centered on present-day Linfen, Shanxi
- Jin River (Fujian) (晋江, Jìn Jiāng), a river in Quanzhou Municipality, Fujian
- Shanxi, a province of China, official abbreviation Jin (晋)

== Names ==
- Jin (Chinese surname)#晋/晉 (Jìn)
- Jin (Korean surname)
- Shin, a masculine Japanese given name
- Susumu, a masculine Japanese given name

== See also ==
- Shin (disambiguation)
- Jin (disambiguation)
