= Ginge =

Ginge may refer to:

- Ginge (pejorative), a pejorative term for people with red hair
- West and East Ginge, hamlets in Oxfordshire containing Ginge Manor
- Mai Ginge Jensen (b. 1984), Danish ten-pin bowler
- Jan Inge “Ginge” Berentsen Anvik (b. 1970), Norwegian composer
- Angryginge (b. 2001; Morgan Burtwhistle), English live streamer

== See also ==
- Ging (disambiguation)
- Gingee (disambiguation)
- Ginger (disambiguation)
- Gingy, a fictional character in the Shrek films
- Jinge Temple, a Buddhist temple in Shanxi province, China
