= Jingzhou (disambiguation) =

Jingzhou is a prefecture-level city in Hubei, China

Jingzhou may also refer to:

- Jingzhou District, in Jingzhou, Hubei, China
- Jingzhou Miao and Dong Autonomous County, in Hunan, China
- Meizhou, formerly known as Jingzhou (敬州), city in Guangdong, China
- Jingzhou (ancient China), an ancient Chinese province covering modern Hubei and Hunan
- Jingzhou (historical prefecture in Shaanxi), a historical prefecture in modern Shaanxi, China during the 10th century
- Jingzhou (historical prefecture in Gansu), a historical prefecture in modern Gansu, China between the 5th and 20th centuries

== See also ==
- Jinzhou (disambiguation)
