= Jinji =

Jinji may refer to:

- Bap (food) for the elderly
- Jinji of Silla, 25th monarch of the ancient Korean kingdom of Silla
- Gingee, town in Tamil Nadu, India
- Gingee Fort, fort in Gingee
- Sunset Rollercoaster, Song "My Jinji"

== China ==
- (in Taiwan) Mandarin lemon
- Jinji Expressway (津蓟高速公路), an expressway running entirely within Tianjin

Towns

- Jinji, Tianchang (金集镇), Anhui
- Jinji, Zhong County (金鸡镇), in Zhong County, Chongqing
- Jinji, Qingshui County (金集镇), in Qingshui County, Gansu
- Jinji, Kaiping (金鸡镇), Guangdong
- Jinji, Luoding (金鸡镇), Guangdong
- Jinji, Teng County (金鸡镇), Guangxi

== See also ==
- Gingee (disambiguation)
