= Gingee (disambiguation) =

Gingee or Jinji is a panchayat town in Viluppuram district in the Indian state of Tamil Nadu.

Gingee may also refer to:

- Gingee (State Assembly Constituency), a state assembly constituency in Tamil Nadu
- Gingee Fort, one of the few surviving forts in Tamil Nadu
- Gingee N. Ramachandran (born 1944), Indian politician
- Gingee taluk, a taluk in Tamil Nadu

== See also ==
- Jinji (disambiguation)
- Ginge (disambiguation)
- Gingy
