= Jinjiang =

Jinjiang may refer to the following locations in China:

- Jinjiang, Chengdu (四川省 成都市 锦江区), the provincial seat district of Sichuan Provincial Government
- Jinjiang, Quanzhou (福建省 泉州市 晋江市), a county-level city under Quanzhou City, Fujian Province

== Buildings ==
- Jinjiang Action Park (上海锦江乐园), an amusement park in Shanghai, China
  - Jinjiang Park Station (上海地铁锦江乐园站), a metro station on Shanghai Metro Line 1
- Sichuan Jinjiang Hotel (四川锦江宾馆), a state guest house in Chengdu, Sichuan, China
- Shanghai Jinjiang Hotel (上海锦江饭店), a for-profit hotel in Shanghai, China
- Jin Jiang Tower (上海新锦江大酒店), a for-profit hotel in Shanghai, China

== Towns ==
Written as "金江镇":

- Jinjiang, Hainan, in Chengmai County
- Jinjiang Town, Linwu County in Linwu County, Hunan
- Jinjiang, Panzhihua, in Renhe District, Panzhihua, Sichuan
- Jinjiang, Yunnan, in Shangri-La County

Written as "锦江镇":

- Jinjiang Town, Pengshan District, Pengshan District, Meishan, Sichuan
- Jinjiang, Yujiang County in Yujiang County, Jiangxi

== Townships ==
- Jinjiang Township, Chongzhou (锦江乡), now part of Daoming Town, Chongzhou, Sichuan
- Jinjiang, Shaoyang (金江乡), a township of Shaoyang County, Hunan province
- Jinjiang Township, Jiangxi (金江乡), in Jiajiang County

== Companies ==
- Jinjiang International

== See also ==
- Jiang Jin
- Jin River (disambiguation)
