= Yue River =

River near Ankang in Shaanxi Province, China

- Chinese: 月河
- Literal meaning: Moon River
Transcriptions
Standard Mandarin
- Hanyu Pinyin: Yuèhé
- Wade–Giles: Yüeh He

The Yue River, also known by its Chinese name Yuehe, is a river near Ankang in Shaanxi Province, China. The placer deposits along its banks gave the area of Ankang its former name Jin ("Gold") Prefecture. The area's gold deposits are still exploited in the present day.

== See also ==
- Rivers of China
