= The Maine Attraction =

American burlesque performer

- Born: Maine Anders; United States
- Education: Georgia State
- Occupation: Burlesque performer
- Website: themaineattraction.com

The Maine Attraction is an American burlesque performer.

== Life and career ==
Originally from Atlanta, her ethnic background is African American and her mother was a German Jew. In her college years at Georgia State University she studied anthropology. Early in her career she worked at the bar in an Atlanta restaurant as well as a belly dancer. Later she travelled to Brooklyn and responded to a Village Voice advertisement, landing a job as a go-go dancer. One night at New York's Limelight Club, a drag performer failed to show up for work and she replaced them using the stage name Victor Victoria, launching her burlesque career.

She went on to work with musicians Lionel Richie and James Brown and as a weekly performer at the Bathtub Gin speakeasy.

She has since worked in Las Vegas at the MGM Grand hotel and casino as well as hosting at Abingdon Theatre Co.'s Broadway in Tribeca, New York.

== Critical reception ==
BroadwayWorld wrote, "Known for her sultry and electrifying acts, The Maine Attraction is sure to set the stage on fire with her mesmerizing performances."
