= Yujing (disambiguation) =

Yujing, yu-jing, or variation, may refer to:

== Places ==
- Yujing District (Chinese: 玉井區; pinyin: Yùjǐng Qū), Tainan, Taiwan
- Yujing Town (余井镇), Qianshan County, Anqing Prefecture, Anhui Province, China; see List of township-level divisions of Anhui
- Yujing Town (玉井镇), Shanyin County, Shuozhou Prefecture, Shanxi Province, China; see List of village-level divisions of Shanxi
- Yujing Township, Enyang District, Bazhong Prefecture, Sichuan Province, China; see Enyang District
- Yujing Square (愉景广场商圈), Guancheng Subdistrict, Dongguan City, Guangdong Province, China; see Guancheng Subdistrict

=== Facilities and structures ===
- Yujing Hot Spring Resort Hotel, Yangxi County, Yangjiang Prefecture, Guangdong Province, China, see Yangxi County
- Yujing Center, Dalian, China; a 350m supertall skyscraper, see List of tallest structures

=== Other places ===
- Yu Jing (Chinese: 玉井; pinyin: Yùjǐng; Jade Well), a Chinese asterism in the IAU constellations of Orion and Eridanus; in the Chinese celestial mansion of Three Stars (Chinese constellation)
- Yujing Feng, China; an ultra-tall mountain, see List of Ultras of Tibet, East Asia and neighbouring areas

== People ==
- Yu Jing (Chinese: 于静; pinyin: Yú Jìng; born 1985), Chinese longtrack speedskater
- Yu Jing (sledge hockey) (born 1983), Chinese sledge hockey player

=== Mythological ===
- Yujing (禺京) descendant of the Yellow Emperor, also known as 禺强, Yuqiang

== See also ==
- Yu (disambiguation)
- Jing (disambiguation)
- Jingyu (disambiguation)
