= Gin (1495) =

Gin (1495) is a grape-based gin range made from a recipe dated from the year 1495. Eric Van Schoonenberghe, Chairman of the Hasselt Jenever Museum, and international drinks expert Philip Duff were credited with the discovery of the recipe in a 1495 cookbook which belonged to a merchant.

== History ==
Jean-Sébastien Robicquet is a French oenologist and master distiller. He created EuroWineGate in 2001. This structure was founded to bridge French wines and spirits with the American market. It became Maison Villevert in 2011. Meanwhile, Jean-Sébastien Robicquet launched Ciroc in 2003. He created this vodka derived from grapes for the multinational spirits company Diageo. He also launched G'Vine in 2006 (grape-based gin).

Chairman of Hasselt Jenever Museum, Eric Van Schoonenberghe discovered an old recipe for a grape-based gin in a 1495 cookbook which belonged to a rich Dutch merchant. Soon after, drinks expert, Philip Duff and Maison Villevert's founder Jean-Sébastien Robicquet, gathered a team of spirits experts composed of Dave Broom, Dave Wondrich and Gaz Regan to recreate a gin from the old recipe and create the Gin 1495 range.

== Production ==
Two products were made from the recipe, "Verbatim" and "Interpretatio". "Verbatim" is the most accurate reproduction of what the gin was in 1495. "Interpretatio" is a modernization of the product made to fit today's standards. According to Dave Broom's manual, the "Verbatim" recipe is made from taking ten quarts of wine (or "mother of wine", possibly lees) thinned with clear water or Hamburg beer "until the water has the thickness of buttermilk" which is then distilled in a two-pot still and then mixed with spices.

== Historical figures ==
Sir Hans Sloane was the former owner of the manuscript and a medical doctor. He gave his name to the area where the manuscript was discovered.

100 bottles of "Verbatim" were made and offered with "Interpretatio" and a copy of the original recipe to museums and spirits institution around the globe. Two bottles were auctioned in Hong Kong and the profits were sent to The Benevolent charity which helps people from the drinks industry.

A set was also auctioned in 2023, on the occasion of the "A tribute to Gaz Regan" project in aid of Wine To Water, a charity working for access to clean water and education.

In September 2024, another set was auctioned at the "Métiers rares & Métiers d'art" charity evening organized by Reflets, in aid of the associations "De l'Or dans les mains" and "L'Outil en main". These two charities are dedicated to preserving and transmitting exceptional craft skills.
