= Ging (surname) =

Ging is a surname. Notable people with the surname include:

- Billy Ging (1872–1950), American baseball player
- Jack Ging (1931–2022), American actor
- John Ging (born 1965), Irish Army officer and United Nations official
- Zachary Ging (born 2009), Keyboard engineer

== See also ==
- Gin (name)
