= Susumu Fukui =

Japanese Go player

Personal information
- Native name: 福井進 (Japanese); フクイススム (Japanese)
- Full name: Susumu Fukui
- Born: May 21, 1947 (age 79) Tokyo, Japan

Sport
- Turned pro: 1965
- Teacher: Kaoru Iwamoto
- Rank: 9 dan
- Affiliation: Nihon Ki-in

Susumu Fukui (福井進, Fukui Susumu; born May 21, 1947) is a professional Go player.

== Biography ==
Susumu became a professional in 1965. He was promoted to 9 dan in 1994. Susumu became a student of Kaoru Iwamoto in 1959. Reached 500 career wins in 1990. Older brother of Masaaki Fukui 8 dan.

== Promotion record ==
Rank	Year	Notes
1 dan	1965	
2 dan	1965	
3 dan	1966	
4 dan	1969	
5 dan	1971	
6 dan	1976	
7 dan	1985	
8 dan	1990	
9 dan	1994	
