= Gin Branch =

Stream in Hickman and Maury County, Tennessee, U.S.

Coordinates: 35.695626°N 87.270844°W

Gin Branch is a stream in Hickman and Maury counties, Tennessee, in the United States. It is a tributary to the Duck River.

Gin Branch was named from the presence of a cotton gin in the 1820s.

== See also ==
- List of rivers of Tennessee
