= Jing (philosophy) =

Confucianist concept

Jing (Chinese: 敬; pinyin: jìng) is a concept in Chinese philosophy which is typically translated as "reverence". It is often used by Confucius in the term gōngjìng (恭敬), meaning "respectful reverence". For Confucians, jìng requires yì, or righteousness, and a proper observation of rituals (lǐ). To have jìng is vitally important in the maintenance of xiào, or filial piety.

The Confucian notion of respect has been likened to the later, western Kantian notion

== Bibliography ==
- Confucius (1997). The Analects of Confucius. Translated by Huang, Chichung. Oxford: Oxford University Press.
- Dillon, Robin S. (2010). "Respect". In Zalta, Edward N. (ed.). Stanford Encyclopedia of Philosophy.
- Richey, J. (2005). "Confucius". Internet Encyclopedia of Philosophy.
