= Qin Empire (disambiguation) =

Qin Empire or Qin dynasty (230–202 BCE), was the first empire in Chinese history.

Qin Empire may also refer to:

- The Qin Empire (TV series), a 2009 Chinese TV series
- The Qin Empire II: Alliance, a 2012 Chinese TV series
- The Qin Empire III, a 2017 Chinese TV series
- The Qin Empire IV, a 2020 Chinese TV series
