= Jinzhou (disambiguation) =

Jinzhou (锦州) is a prefecture-level city in Liaoning, China.

Jinzhou—an atonal pinyin romanization of various Chinese prefectures or prefectural seats—may also refer to:

== Prefectures ==
- Jin Prefecture (Shaanxi) (金州), a former imperial prefecture
- Jin Prefecture (Shanxi) (晋州), a former imperial prefecture
- Jin Prefecture (Hunan) (锦州), a former imperial prefecture

== Towns ==
- Jinzhou, Hebei (晋州), a county-level city in Hebei, China
- Jinzhou, Jinzhou, in Jinzhou, Hebei, China
- Jinzhou, Ningxiang, in Ningxiang, Hunan, China
- Jinzhou, a former name of Ankang, Shaanxi
- Jinzhou, a former name of Linfen, Shanxi
- Jinzhou, a former name of Luyang, Hunan
- Jinzhou Township (金洲乡), a township in Dongliao County, Jilin, China

== Districts ==
- Jinzhou District (金州区), a district in Dalian, Liaoning, China
- Jinzhou New Area, a development zone in Jinzhou District

== Other ==
- Jinzhou Station (Guangzhou Metro) on the Guangzhou Metro

== See also ==
- Jin (disambiguation)
- Jingzhou (disambiguation)
