= Jin Prefecture (Shaanxi) =

Historical administrative division in Shaanxi, China

- Chinese: 金州
- Literal meaning: Golden Prefecture
Transcriptions
Standard Mandarin
- Hanyu Pinyin: Jīnzhōu
- Wade–Giles: Chin-chou

Jin Prefecture, also known by its Chinese name Jinzhou, was a prefecture of imperial China. Its seat—also known as Jinzhou—was at Xicheng (modern Ankang, Shaanxi).

== History ==
Jin was created from Eastern Liang Prefecture (東梁州, Dōngliángzhōu) in AD 554 under the Western Wei Dynasty. Its name—the "gold" or "golden" prefecture—derives from the placer deposits along the Yue or Moon River still exploited to this day.

Under the Sui, it was renamed Xicheng Commandery (西城郡, Xīchéngjùn). Under the Tang, it was renamed Ankang Commandery (安康郡, Ānkāngjùn). It held 53,029 people in 14,091 households in 639 and 57,929 people in the same number of households in 742.

It was abolished again under the Ming in 1583.

== Geography ==
Jin Commandery in the Tang dynasty lay around modern Ankang, Shaanxi. It probably includes parts of modern Ankang, Hanyin, Xunyang, and Shiquan.

== See also ==
- Other Jin Prefectures/Jinzhous
