= Jin Prefecture (Hunan) =

Historical administrative division in Hunan, China

- Traditional Chinese: 錦州
- Simplified Chinese: 锦州
- Literal meaning: Brocade Prefecture
Transcriptions
Standard Mandarin
- Hanyu Pinyin: Jǐnzhōu
- Wade–Giles: Chin-chou

Jin Prefecture, also known by its Chinese name Jinzhou, was a prefecture of imperial China. Its seat—also known as Jinzhou—was at Luyang (near modern Mayang, Hunan).

== History ==
Jin was created from Chen Prefecture (宸州, Chénzhōu) in AD 686 under the Tang Dynasty. It was later renamed Luyang Commandery (盧陽郡, Lúyángjùn).

== See also ==
- Other Jin Prefectures/Jinzhous
