= Gin Gin =

Gin Gin may refer to:

- Gin Gin, Queensland, a town in the Bundaberg Region, Australia
- Gin Gin, New South Wales

== See also ==
- Gingin, Western Australia
- Shire of Gingin, Western Australia
- RAAF Gingin, Western Australia, a military airfield
