= The Drinks Trust =

British charity supporting people who have or are working in the drinks industry

- Formation: 1886; 140 years ago
- Founder: Robert Gray
- Type: Nonprofit organization
- Legal status: Charity
- Purpose: Charity dedicated to the drinks and hospitality workforce
- Location: London, United Kingdom
- Region served: England, Wales and Northern Ireland
- Services: Wellbeing, financial and practical support
- Leader: Nicola Burston
- Funding: Donations and charity events
- Website: www.drinkstrust.org.uk
- Formerly called: The Benevolent (The drinks industry charity) and The Wine & Spirit Trades' Benevolent Society

The Drinks Trust, formerly The Benevolent, is a British registered charity that provides practical, emotional and financial support to people who work or have worked in the UK drinks industry, and their families.

== History ==
The charity was founded in 1886 following the publication of a letter written by Robert Gray, a City of London wine merchant, to the Chairman of The Wine and Spirit Association proposing the formation of a Benevolent Society for the current and previous long-term employees of the wine and spirit trade facing hardship.

The charity supports people from all areas of the drinks industry including those involved in the production, distribution, marketing, import, export and sales of alcohol in both the on trade and off trade of the UK market. The charity operates in England, Wales, Scotland and Northern Ireland.

In 2020, the charity changed its name from The Benevolent to The Drinks Trust as part of a significant change to its services to include wellbeing services, addiction and alcohol consumption services and an increase in therapy grants.
