= Jing Prefecture (Shaanxi) =

Former administrative division of China

Jingzhou or Jing Prefecture (靜州) was a zhou (prefecture) in imperial China centering around modern Mizhi County, Shaanxi, China. During the Five Dynasties and Ten Kingdoms period it was occupied by the Tangut people under the Dingnan Jiedushi's control.
