= Susumu Katsumata =

Susumu Katsumata may refer to:

- Susumu Katsumata (footballer), Japanese footballer
- Susumu Katsumata (manga artist), Japanese manga artist
