= Qin =

Qin may refer to:

== Dynasties and states ==
- Qin (state) (秦), a major state during the Zhou Dynasty of ancient China
- Qin dynasty (秦), founded by the Qin state in 221 BC and ended in 206 BC
- Daqin (大秦), ancient Chinese name for the Roman Empire
- Former Qin (前秦), Di state/Di (Wu Hu) in the Sixteen Kingdoms period, 351 AD
- Later Qin (后秦), Qiang state in the Sixteen Kingdoms period, 384 AD
- Western Qin (西秦), Xianbei state in the Sixteen Kingdoms period, 409 AD

== Geography ==
- Qin (秦), another name of Shaanxi province, China
- Qin County (沁县), in Shanxi province, China
- Qin River (Shanxi) (沁河) in Shanxi, tributary of the Yellow River
- Qin River (Hebei) (寢水) in Hebei, a former name of the Ming River

== Other uses ==
- Qin (surname)
- Qin (board game)
- Qin (Mandaeism), a demon of the Mandaean underworld
- Qin (Star Wars), a character on the television series The Mandalorian
- BYD Qin, a car
- Guqin (古琴), or qin, Chinese stringed musical instrument
- QIN, an acronym for the Quinault Indian Nation, Native American peoples in the United States
- qin(), one representation of the functional fourth root of sin()
- Hata (surname), Japanese surname
- Qin: Tomb of the Middle Kingdom, a Myst-like graphic adventure computer game

== See also ==
- Qin Empire (disambiguation)
