= Jin Homura =

Japanese painter (born 1948)

Jin Homura (born 1948) is a Japanese painter. He works in oil paints, using the primary colors of red, yellow, and blue.
