= Bathtub gin =

Style of homemade spirit

Bathtub gin refers to any style of homemade spirit made in amateur conditions. The term first appeared in 1920, in the prohibition in the United States, in reference to the poor-quality alcohol that was being made.

As gin was the predominant drink in the 1920s, many variations were created by mixing cheap grain alcohol with water and flavorings and other agents, such as juniper berry juice and glycerin. In addition, mixing grain alcohol, water, and flavorings in vessels large enough to supply commercial users had to be small enough for the operation to go undetected by the police.

Many gin cocktails such as Bee's knees owe their existence to bathtub gin, as they were also created in order to mask the unpleasant taste.

== Etymology ==
A suggested etymology is from the use of the bathtub faucet for diluting moonshine. The larger bottles used for moonshine "wouldn't always fit beneath the kitchen sink, so they turned to the larger basin area provided by a bathtub to add water to their wares."

== See also ==
- Bathtub Gin (speakeasy)
- Fusel alcohol
- Prohibition
- History of alcohol
- Alcoholic beverage
- Distilled beverages
- List of cocktails
- List of alcoholic beverages
- Moonshine
- Speakeasy
