= Gin (name) =

Gin is the name of:

- Gin people, a Việt Kinh group
- Gin Chow (1857–1933), Chinese immigrant who gained fame in California as a prophet and fortune teller
- Gin Wigmore (born 1986), New Zealand singer songwriter
- Madeline Gins (1941–2014), American artist, architect, and poet

== Characters ==
Gin (pronounced with a hard G) is also the name of the following Japanese fictional characters:

- Gin Ichimaru, a character in Bleach
- Gin (Case Closed), a member of the Black Organization in Case Closed
- Ghin (One Piece), a character in One Piece
- Gin, a character in Hotarubi no Mori e
- A fictional Akita Inu bear-hunting dog in Ginga: Nagareboshi Gin and Ginga Densetsu Weed
- Gintoki Sakata, a character in Gintama
- Suigintou, a character in Rozen Maiden
- Gin Ibushi, a character in Kimi ga Shine
- Minowa Gin, one of the three main characters of Washio Sumi is a Hero.
- Gin Akutagawa (芥川銀), a character in Bungo Stray Dogs
- Gin Gagamaru (我牙丸吟), a character in Blue Lock
