= Jin Prefecture (Shanxi) =

Former Chinese prefecture

- Traditional Chinese: 晉州
- Literal meaning: Jin Prefecture
Transcriptions
Standard Mandarin
- Hanyu Pinyin: Jìnzhōu
- Wade–Giles: Chin-chou

Jin Prefecture, also known by its Chinese name Jinzhou, was a prefecture of imperial China. Its seat—also known as Jinzhou—was at Pingyang (modern Linfen, Shanxi).

== History ==
Jin was created from Tang Prefecture (唐州, Tángzhōu) in AD 528 under the Northern Wei dynasty. It was named for the Jin River that also gave its name to the Jin march, duchy, and empire. Under the Sui, it was renamed Linfen Commandery (臨汾郡, Línfénjùn). Under the Tang, it was renamed Pingyang Commandery (平陽郡, Píngyángjùn). It held 103,100 people in 28,250 households c. 550; 97,505 people in 21,617 households in 639; and 429,221 people in 64,836 households in 742.

== Geography ==
Jin Commandery in the Tang dynasty lay around modern Linfen and Hongtong in Shaanxi.

== See also ==
- Other Jin Prefectures
- Other Jinzhous
