= Bathtub Gin (speakeasy) =

- Interactive map of Bathtub Gin
- Location: 132 Ninth Avenue, New York City, New York, 10011, U.S.
- Coordinates: 40°44′37″N 74°00′12″W
- Owner: Dave Oz
- Type: Speakeasy, cocktail bar
- Event: Speakeasy

Construction
- Opened: 2011

Website
- bathtubginnyc.com

Bathtub Gin is a 1920s style speakeasy and cocktail bar located in New York City.

Opened 2011 in Manhattan's Chelsea neighborhood by Dave Oz, this Prohibition style speakeasy has been described as being "Stashed behind a tiny storefront. An unmarked door leads into a smallish bar with gaudy damask wallpaper, pressed tin ceilings and silk couches. The copper bathtub in the heart of the room is a prop for Facebook photos.

Bathtub Gin also has live entertainment such as burlesque which has featured performer The Maine Attraction.

== Los Angeles location ==
A second Bathtub Gin speakeasy opened December 7, 2021 in Los Angeles, California.

The Los Angeles location closed in 2024.

== Critical reception ==
Time Out magazine voted Bathtub Gin number 10 of the best speakeasy-inspired bars in New York City saying, "If you’re really thirsty for the whole hide-and-seek conceit, or simply tolerating someone who is, this is the place to be," adding, "In the back after dark, it’s Jazz Age cosplay, baby."

The New York Times wrote, "Like an infestation of voles, speakeasies continue to burrow their way into the city’s night life. The latest is Bathtub Gin, a fake Victorian bar 'hidden' behind a coffee shop in Chelsea. Opened last month, the lounge hopes to corral herds from the meatpacking district with the easy refinement of cocktail culture."

New York magazine said, "The owners wisely decided to focus their cocktail list on recipes predating the bathtub-brewing decade, with substantial bar food a modern fusion affair. Weeknights offer an opportunity to sink back in one of the speakeasy’s plush, damask banquettes over a cocktail or two while weekends are more raucous."
