= List of YuYu Hakusho chapters =

First tankōbon volume cover, released by Shueisha on April 10, 1991

The YuYu Hakusho manga was written and drawn by Yoshihiro Togashi and was published by Shueisha in the Japanese-language magazine Weekly Shōnen Jump. The series concentrates on the adventures of young delinquent Yusuke Urameshi, who after his death becomes a Spirit Detective, the protector of the Living World against supernatural threats.

The manga consists of 19 tankōbon volumes; the first tankōbon was released on April 10, 1991, and the last one was released on December 2, 1994. An anime adaptation of the series of 112 television episodes was directed by Noriyuki Abe and co-produced by Fuji TV, Yomiko Advertising, and Studio Pierrot. In August 2004, Shueisha released a kanzenban edition. Each kanzenban volume features a new cover. The kanzenban release of the series is 15 volumes long (as opposed to the original 19 tankōbon, each book contains more chapters than the basic editions), with two coming out monthly.

In 2003, YuYu Hakusho was translated to English and first serialized in North America by Viz Media. The first chapters debuted in the premiere issue of Shonen Jump magazine. The first volume was later released on May 1, 2003, and the last on March 2, 2010. In 2013, Viz Media started to adapt the volumes to a digital format as part of their digital manga releases.

== Volumes ==
No.	Title	Original release date	English release date
1	Goodbye, Material World! Sayonara Gensei!! (さよなら現世‼の巻)	April 10, 1991; 4-08-871273-0	May 1, 2003; 1-56931-904-9
001. "Goodbye, Material World!" (さよなら現世‼, Sayonara Gensei!!); 002. "Test for Resurrection!!" (復活への試練‼, Fukkatsu e no Shiren!!); 003. "Time for Departure!!" (旅立ちの時‼, Tabidachi no Toki!!); 004. "The Old Dog and the Boy" (老犬と少年‼, Rō Inu to Shōnen!!); 005. "Her First Christmas!" (一年めクリスマス‼, Shodaime Kurisumasu!!); 006. "The Lonely Journey" (孤独の旅路‼, Kodoku no Tabiji!!); 007. "The Promise!" (約束‼, Yakusoku!!); 008. "The Temporary Resurrection (Part 1)" (束の間の復活 (前編), Tsukanoma no Fukkatsu (Zenpen))
2	The Golden Awakening!! Giniiro no Mezame!! (黄金色のめざめ‼の巻)	June 10, 1991; 4-08-871274-9	October 22, 2003; 1-59116-082-0
009. "The Temporary Resurrection (Part 2)" (束の間の復活 (後編), Tsukanoma no Fukkatsu (Kōhen)); 010. "The Forbidden Games!!" (禁断の遊び!!, Kindan no Asobi!!); 011. "The Fractured Friendship" (ひび割れた友情‼, Hibiwareta Yūjō!!); 012. "The Hand of Evil" (魔の手‼, Ma no Te!!); 013. "Qualifications for a Girlfriend!" (恋人の条件!!, Koibito no Jōken!!); 014. "Into the Inferno...!!" (炎の中で…!, Hono'o no Naka de...!); 015. "Just One Win!!" (めざせ1勝‼, Mezase Ichi-shōn!!); 016. "Finding the Guts for Glory!!" (勝負は度胸‼, Shōbu wa Dokyō!!); 017. "The Golden Awakening!!" (黄金色のめざめ‼, Giniiro no Mezame!!)
3	The Cursed Forest!! Mashō no Mori!! (魔性の森‼の巻)	September 15, 1991; 4-08-871275-7	January 21, 2004; 1-59116-183-5
018. "The New Mission!!" (新たなる使命!!の巻, Aratanaru Shimei!! no maki) (Note: English publisher Viz Media mislabels this as a second chapter 17, so all of their subsequent chapter numbers are off by one.); 019. "Action!" (出動!!の巻, Shutsudō!! no maki); 020. "The Deadly Trio!!" (三匹の妖怪‼の巻, Sambiki no yōkai!! no maki; lit. 'The Three Yōkai!!'); 021. "The Muncher of Souls!!" (魂を喰う男‼の巻, Tamashii o Kū Otoko!! no maki; lit. 'The Man Who Eats Souls!!'); 022. "What Binds a Mother and Son!!" (母と子の絆‼の巻, Haha to Ko no Kizuna!! no maki; lit. 'The Bond Between a Mother and Son!!'); 023. "Hiei of the Evil Eye!!" (邪眼師·飛影‼の巻, Jaganshi - Hiei!! no maki; lit. 'User of the Jagan - Hiei!!'); 024. "The Fearsome, Gruesome Binding Curse!!" (恐怖の呪縛獄‼の巻, Kyōfu no Jubakugoku!! no maki; lit. 'Dread of the Hellish Curse!!'); 025. "Operation: Infiltrate!!" (潜入捜査開始‼の巻, Sen'nyū Sōsa Kaishi!! no maki; lit. 'The Infiltration Investigation Begins!!'); 026. "The Cursed Forest!!" (魔性の森‼の巻, Mashō no Mori!! no maki; lit. 'The Devilish Forest!!')
4	A Challenge from where the Ghosts Dwell!! Yōmagai kara no Chōsenjō!! (妖魔街からの挑戦状‼の巻)	November 15, 1991; 4-08-871276-5	May 19, 2004; 1-59116-325-0
027. "Mortal Maneuvers in the Dark!!" (闇の中の死闘‼の巻, Yami no Naka no Shitō!! no maki; lit. 'Fight to the Death in the Dark!!'); 028. "To Fight a Master!!" (武道家·牙野‼の巻, Budōka - Kibano!! no maki; lit. 'Martial Artist - Kibano!!'); 029. "Kaze-Maru — Ninja!!" (忍者·風丸‼の巻, Ninja - Kazemaru!! no maki; lit. 'Ninja - Kazemaru!!'); 030. "Shaolin = Randō!?" (松林=乱童⁉の巻, Shōrin Ikōru Randō!? no maki; lit. 'Shōrin equals Randō!?'); 031. "The Raging Fist!!" (怒りの鉄拳‼の巻, Ikari no Tekken!! no maki); 032. "Genkai's Successor is Chosen!!" (奥義継承者決定‼の巻, Ōgi Keishōsha Kettei!! no maki; lit. 'The Successor of the Secret is Chosen!!'); 033. "Challenge from Demon City!!" (妖魔街からの挑戦状‼の巻, Yōmagai kara no Chōsenjō!! no maki; lit. 'A Challenge from Where Ghosts Dwell!!'); 034. "The Gate of Betrayal!!" (裏切りの門‼の巻, Uragiri no Mon!! no maki); 035. "Genbu is... The Very Rock!!" (人岩一体·玄武‼の巻, Jingan Ittai - Genbu!! no maki; lit. 'Man and Rock United - Genbu!!')
5	Focus Your Mind As One! Kokoro o Hitotsu ni!! (心をひとつに‼の巻)	March 10, 1992; 4-08-871277-3	October 12, 2004; 978-1-59116-521-7
036. "Byakko's Battle Roar!!" (白虎の雄叫び‼, Byakko no Otakebi!!); 037. "A Double-Edged Sword!!" (諸刃の剣‼, Moroha no Ken!!); 038. "The Tiger's Annihilation Roar!!" (鳴虎衝壊波‼, Meiko Shōkai-ha!!); 039. "Hiei Joins the Fray!!" (飛影出戦‼, Hiei Shussen!!); 040. "Prelude to Carnage!!" (殺戮のプレリュード‼, Satsuriku no Pureryūdo!!); 041. "Fist of Dark Lightning!!" (暗黒雷迅拳‼, Ankoku Raijin Ken!!); 042. "Demonic Array of Darkness!!" (暗黒妖籠陣！！, Ankoku Yōrō-jin!!); 043. "To the Reachable - and Beyond!!" (心をひとつに！, Kokoro o Hitotsu ni!; lit. 'Focus your Mind as One!'); 044. "The Last Measure!!" (最後の方法！！, Saigo no Hōhō!!); 045. "Battle at 'Hell Housing Development'!!" (決闘！地獄団地‼, Kettō! Jigoku Danchi!!)
6	The Dark Martial Arts Association Begins!! /The Dark Tournament; Ankoku Bujutsu Kai Kaimaku!! (暗黒武術会開幕‼の巻)	June 10, 1992; 4-08-871278-1	February 1, 2005; 1-59116-668-3
046. "Springtime for Kuwabara!!" (桑原の春‼, Kuwabara no Haru!!) (Note: Viz Media fixed their numbering with this chapter.); 047. "The Black Book Club!!" (B・B・C‼, Burakku Bukku Kurabu!!); 048. "Next Up: The Ogre Triad!!" (三鬼衆登場‼, Sanki Shū Ttōjō!!); 049. "The Last Gamble!!" (最後の賭け‼, Saigo no Kake!!); 050. "The Final Battle: Two on Two!!" (決戦・2対2‼, Kessen - Ni Tai Ni!!); 051. "I Must Get Stronger!!" (強くなりたい‼, Tsuyoku Naritai!!); 052. "The Dark Tournament Begins!!" (暗黒武術会開幕‼, Ankoku Bujutsu Kai Kaimaku!!); 053. "The First Opponents!!" (最初の敵‼, Saisho no Teki!!); 054. "The Vanguard Battle Begins!!" (先鋒戦開始‼, Senpō-sen Kaishi!!); 055. "The Secret of Devil Yo-Yos!!" (秘技・魔妖妖‼, Higi - Debiru Yōyō!!)
7	Knife-Edge Death Match; Naifuejji Desumacchi (ナイフエッジ・デスマッチの巻)	August 10, 1992; 4-08-871279-X	June 8, 2005; 1-59116-812-0
056. "Blood-Stained Flowers!!" (血染めの花‼, Chizome no Hana!!); 057. "The Fearsome Hell of Blazing Heat!!" (恐怖の炎熱地獄‼, Kyōfu no Ennetsu Jigoku!!); 058. "Drunken Master: Chu!!" (酔拳士・酎‼, Yoi Kobushi-shi - Chu!!); 059. "A Close Game!!" (互角の勝負‼, Gokaku no Shōbu!!); 060. "Knife-Edge Sudden Death!!" (ナイフエッジ・デスマッチ, Naifuejji Desumacchi); 061. "The Top Eight Line-Up!!" (ベスト8出そろう！！‼, Besuto Eito Desorou!!); 062. "The Second Round Begins!!" (2回戦開始‼, Ni-Kaisen Kaishi!!); 063. "The Despicable Blood-Slaver Node!!" (卑劣！操血瘤‼, Hiretsu! Sō Ketsu-ryū!!); Extra: "YuYu Hakusho Tales: Two Shot" (外伝. TWO SHOTS) (Note: Viz Media counts this as chapter 64, so all subsequent chapter numbers are ahead by one when compared to the Japanese release. English Wikipedia follows Viz's numbering hereafter for consistency's sake.)
8	Surpass the Reigun!!/Open Your Eyes!! Reigan o Koero!! (霊丸を越えろ‼の巻)	October 2, 1992; 4-08-871280-3	October 10, 2005; 978-1-4215-0026-3
065. "Open Your Eyes!!" (目を覚ませ‼, Me o Samase!!); 066. "One vs. Three!!" (1対3‼, Ichi Tai San!!); 067. "The Shadow Channelers Take Center Stage!!" (魔性使いT登場‼, Mashō-zukai Chīmu Tōjō!!); 068. "Gama: Ritual Body Art Master!!" (化粧使い・画魔‼, Keshō-zukai - Gama!!); 069. "Toya: Ice Master!!" (呪氷使い・凍矢‼, Juhyō-zukai - Tōya!!); 070. "A Battle All Alone" (ひとりきりの戦い, Hitori kiri no Tatakai); 071. "Fist of Rage!!" (一閃！怒りの拳‼, Issen! Ikari no Kobushi!!); 072. "A Dangerous Gamble!!" (やばいカケ‼, Yabai Kake!!); 073. "Surpass the Reigun!!" (霊丸を越えろ‼, Reigan o Koero!!)
9	The Huge Ordeal!! Saidai no Shiren!! (最大の試練‼の巻)	December 2, 1992; 4-08-871515-2	April 4, 2006; 978-1-4215-0278-6
074. "An Unexpected Defeat?!" (意外な敗北⁉, Igaina Haiboku!?); 075. "The Eleventh Hour!!" (瀬戸際の戦い‼, Setogiwa no Tatakai!!); 076. "The Underworld Beast!!" (霊界獣出現‼, Reikai-juu Sshutsugen!!); 077. "The Face Under the Mask" (覆面の下の素顔, Fukumen no Shita no Sugao); 078. "The Huge Ordeal!!" (最大の試練‼, Saidai no Shiren!!); 079. "The Top Four!!" (四強そろう‼, Yon-kyō Sorou!!); 080. "Hiei Fights Again!!" (飛影連戦‼, Hiei Rensen!!); 081. "The Invincible Beast Armor!!" (無敵・武獣装甲‼, Muteki - Bu-juu Sōkō!!); 082. "When the Magic Box Opens!!" (玉手箱が開く時‼, Tamatebako ga Hiraku Toki!!)
10	Unforgivable!! Yurusenai!! (許せない‼の巻)	February 4, 1993; 4-08-871516-0	August 1, 2006; 978-1-4215-0695-1
083. "The Fox Demon Awakens!!" (目ざめた妖狐‼, Mezameta Yōko!!); 084. "Shishiwakamaru's Skill!!" (妖技・死々若丸‼, Yōgi - Shishiwakamaru!!); 085. "Identity Revealed!!" (正体判明‼, Shōtai Hanmei!!); 086. "Calls of the Dead!!" (死霊の呼び声‼, Shiryō no Yobigoe!!); 087. "Enemy Leader: The Old Bloke!!" (敵将・怨爺‼, Tekishō - Onjī!!); 088. "The Man with a Thousand Faces!!" (千の顔を持つ男‼, Sen no Kao o Motsu Otoko!!); 089. "The Logic of the Powerful!!" (強者の論理‼, Tsuwamono no Ronri!!); 090. "A 50-Year Reunion!!" (50年ぶりの再会‼, 50-Nen-buri no Saikai!!); 091. "The Dreadful 80% Power!!" (恐怖の80%‼, Kyōfu no 80-pāsento!!); 092. "Unforgivable!!" (許せない‼, Yurusenai!!)
11	Eat or Be Eaten!! Kuu ka Kuwareru ka!! (喰うか喰われるか‼の巻)	April 2, 1993; 4-08-871517-9	December 5, 2006; 978-1-4215-0696-8
093. "The Day Before the Storm!!" (嵐の前‼, Arashi no Mae!!); 094. "Leveling Up! Rules" (レベルアップ！, Reberuappu!); 095. "The Rules Rule!!" (ルールの壁‼, Rūru no Kabe!!); 096. "The Invisible Feat!!" (見えない技‼, Mienai Waza!!); 097. "An Exchange of One-upmanship!!" (秘技応酬‼, Higi Ōshū!!); 098. "Sacrifice...!!" (身を捨てて…‼, Mi o Sutete...!!); 099. "The Reason Behind the Armor!!" (鎧の理由‼, Yoroi no Riyū!!); 100. "Eat or be Eaten!!" (喰うか喰われるか‼, Kuu Ka Kuwareruka!!); 101. "Kuwabara Snaps!!" (桑原切れた‼, Kuwabara Kireta!!)
12	The Championship Match Begins!! Ketteisen Kaishi!! (決定戦開始‼の巻)	June 9, 1993; 4-08-871518-7	May 1, 2007; 1-4215-1118-5
102. "The Elder Toguro at his Peak!!" (戸愚呂兄 全開‼の巻, Toguro-ani Furu Pawā!! no maki; lit. 'The Elder Toguro at Full Power!!'); 103. "Sakyō's Proposal!!" (左京の提案‼の巻, Sakyō no Teian!! no maki); 104. "The Championship Match Begins!!" (決定戦開始‼の巻, Ketteisen Kaishi!! no maki); 105. "No Effect!?" (通用しない⁉の巻, Tsūyōshinai!? no maki); 106. "Undo the Seal!!" (封印を解け‼の巻, Fūin o Toke!! no maki); 107. "Not Enough Sense of Peril?" (危機感が足りない？の巻, Kikikan ga Tarinai? no maki); 108. "Insufficient Fury!!" (怒りの不足‼の巻, Ikari no Fusoku!! no maki); 109. "Testing the Limits!!" (限界への試練‼の巻, Genkai e no Shiren!! no maki); 110. "The Crucial Difference!!" (決定的な違い‼の巻, Ketteiteki na Chigai!! no maki)
13	The Executors of a Dying Wish!! Ishi o Tsugu Yatsura!! (遺志を継ぐ奴等‼の巻)	August 4, 1993; 4-08-871519-5	October 7, 2007; 1-4215-1119-3
111. "Full Power One Last Time!!" (最後のフルパワー‼, Saigo no Furu Pawā!!); 112. "The Most Fervent Wish!!" (一番の望め‼, Ichiban no Nozome!!); 113. "Toguro's Repentance!!" (戸愚呂の償い‼, Toguro no Tsugunai!!); 114. "Welcome to Our Territory!!" (「領域」にようこそ‼, "Teritorī" ni Yōkoso!!); 115. "The Peculiar Ability!!" (奇妙な能力‼, Kimyōna Nōryoku!!); 116. "The Ability of "Taboo"!!" (「禁句」の能力‼, "Tabū" no Nōryoku!!); 117. "The Taboo is One Letter!!" (「禁句」は一文字‼, "Tabū" wa Hitomoji!!); 118. "The Abilities of the Other Two!!" (残る二人の能力‼, Nokoru Futari no Nōryoku!!); 119. "The Executors of a Dying Wish!!" (意志を継ぐ奴等‼, Ishi o Tsugu Yatsura!!)
14	A Bloody Past!! Chi Nurareta Kako!! (血塗られた過去‼の巻)	October 4, 1993; 4-08-871520-9	February 5, 2008; 1-4215-1120-7
120. "Into the Lion's Den...!!" (虎穴に入らずんば…‼, Koketsu ni Irazunba...!!); 121. "Who's the Mastermind?!" (首謀者は誰だ⁉, Atama wa Dareda!?); 122. "Murder Surgery!!" (殺人手術‼, Satsujin Shujutsu!!); 123. "The Cry of a Shadow!!" (影の叫び‼, Shadō no Sakebi!!); 124. "No Choice...!!" (殺るしかない…‼, Yaru Shika nai!!); 125. "Fierce Rain...!!" (激しい雨が…‼, Hageshī ame ga!!); 126. "The Man They've Been Looking For!!" (探していた男‼, Sagashite ita Otoko!!); 127. "The Black Chapter!!" (黒の章‼, Kuro no Shō!!); 128. "A Bloody Past!!" (血塗られた過去‼, Chi Nurareta Kako!!); 129. "Aura Lightning Kickboxing!!" (霊光裂蹴拳‼, Reikō Resshūken!!)
15	Standoff at the Eleventh Hour!! Setogiwa no Taiji!! (瀬戸際の対峙‼の巻)	December 2, 1993; 4-08-871521-7	July 1, 2008; 1-4215-1516-4
130. "Super Street Fighting!!" (超・市街地戦‼, Chō Shigaichi-sen!!); 131. "The Death Cross!!" (死紋十字斑‼, Shimonjūjihan!!); 132. "The Real Pursuer!!" (本当の追跡者‼, Hontō no Tsuiseki-sha!!); 133. "Cool Off!!" (頭を冷やせ‼, Atama o Hiyase!!); 134. "Into the Cave!!" (洞窟の中へ‼, Dōkutsu no Naka e!!); 135. "Best at Games!!" (ゲームは得意!!, Gēmu wa Tokui!!); 136. "What if We Lose?!" (負けたら どうなる⁉, Maketara Dō Naru!?); 137. "The Grim Decision!!" (悲壮な決断‼, Hisōna Ketsudan!!); 138. "Standoff at the Eleventh Hour!!" (瀬戸際の対峙‼, Setogiwa no Taiji!!); 139. "His True Identity?!" (正体は誰だ⁉, Shōtai wa Dareda!?)
16	Breaking Into Makai; Makai e no Totsunyū!! (魔界への突入‼の巻)	March 4, 1994; 4-08-871522-5	December 2, 2008; 978-1-4215-1517-5
140. "The Factors for Fascination!!" (魅きつける理由‼, Hi Kitsukeru Wake!!); 141. "Reasons He Can't Win, Nos. 1-3!!" (勝てない理由 その1～3‼, Katenai Riyū - Sono 1~3!!); 142. "They Were Seven!!" (七人いる‼, Nana-nin Iru!!); 143. "Koenma Gets Serious!!" (コエンマの本気‼, Koenma no Honki!!); 144. "The Ultimate Aura!!" (究極の闘気‼, Kyūkyoku no Tōki!!); 145. "Unstoppable!!" (止められない‼, Tomerarenai!!); 146. "When Everything Stood Still!!" (全てが止まった瞬間‼, Subete ga Tomatta Toki!!); 147. "Into the Demon Plane!!" (魔界への突入‼, Makai e no Totsunyū!!); 148. "The Despair Continues...!!" (絶望の続き…‼, Zetsubō no Tsudzuki...!!); 149. "Moment of Awakening!!" (覚醒の瞬間‼, Kakusei no Toki!!)
17	Their Respective Decisions!!/Separate Choices; Sorezore no Kesshin!! (それぞれの決心‼の巻)	June 3, 1994; 4-08-871523-3	May 5, 2009; 978-1-4215-2448-1
150. "Mano a Mano, Again!!" (ー対ー、再び‼, ~Sashi~, Futatabi!!); 151. "An Unparalleled Battle!!" (ケタ違いの闘い‼, Ketachigai no Batoru!!); 152. "A Fearsome Awakening!!" (恐るべき覚醒‼, Osorubeki Kakusei!!); 153. "Sensui's Last Wishes!!" (仙水の遺言‼, Sensui no Yuigon!!); 154. "Their Respective Tomorrows!!" (それぞれの明日‼, Sorezore no Ashita!!); 155. "Kuroko Sanada, First Underworld Detective!!" (初代霊界探偵・真田黒呼‼, Shodai Reikai Tantei - Sanada Kuroko!!); 156. "An Invitation to The Demon Plane!!" (魔界への招待状‼, Makai e no Jōtaijō!!); 157. "The Sign of a Connection!!" (同類の証‼, Dōrui no Akashi!!); 158. "Their Respective Decisions!!" (それぞれの決心‼, Sorezore no Kesshin!!); 159. "A Reunion With Dad!!" (親父との再会‼, Oyaji to no Saikai!!)
18	The Makai Unification Tournament/The Makai Tournament; Makai Touitsu Tōnamento (魔界統一トーナメント)	September 2, 1994; 4-08-871524-1	October 6, 2009; 978-1-4215-2449-8
160. "How They Spent Their Year: Hiei, Part 1" (それぞれの一年 飛影 前編, Sorezore no Ichi-nen: Hiei - Zenpen); 161. "How They Spent Their Year: Hiei, Part 2" (それぞれの一年 飛影 後編, Sorezore no Ichi-nen: Hiei - Kōhen); 162. "How They Spent Their Year: Kurama, Part 1" (それぞれの一年 蔵馬 前編, Sorezore no Ichi-nen: Kurama - Zenpen); 163. "How They Spent Their Year: Kurama, Part 2" (それぞれの一年 蔵馬 後編, Sorezore no Ichi-nen: Kurama - Kōhen); 164. "Raizen's Last Wishes" (雷禅の遺言, Raizen no Yuigon); 165. "Yusuke's Gift" (幽助の土産, Yūsuke no miyage); 166. "Visitors" (来訪者たち, Raihō-sha-tachi); 167. "Demon Plane Unification Tournament" (魔界統一トーナメント, Makai Touitsu Tōnamento); 168. "Tournament Prelims" (トーナメント予選, Tōnamento Yosen)
19	And So... Sore kara... (それから…)	December 2, 1994; 4-08-871525-X	March 2, 2010; 978-1-4215-2450-4
169. "The Emotions of Round One" (一回戦の喜怒哀楽, Ichi-kaisen no Kidoairaku); 170. "The Highlight of Round Three" (三回戦の目玉, San-kaisen no Medama); 171. "After The Party" (宴のあと, Utagenoato); 172. "Reviving The Detective Business" (探偵業復活, Tantei-gyō Fukkatsu); 173. "Special Day"; 174. "Harmonious Soldier" (平和の群像, Heiwa no Gunzō); 175. "Sink or Swim" (のるか そるか, Noru ka Soru ka); 176. "And So..." (それから…, Sore kara...)
