= Shigeru Ueda =

Japanese anime director

Shigeru Ueda (Japanese: うえだ しげる, Hepburn: Ueda Shigeru) is a Japanese anime storyboard artist and director.

== Animation career ==
When Ueda graduated from university, he joined now-defunct AUBEC to work in the animation industry. After working as a production manager and assistant director, he made his directorial debut with Tsuruhime Ja! (before that, he had worked in anime and commercials as well). At that same time, he married a female animator. Later, after working as an episode director on Sohryuden: Legend of the Dragon Kings, he left AUBEC and worked at various companies such as Anime Spot and Madhouse and is currently working as a freelancer.

He has been using the hiragana spelling of his name since his days as an assistant director (the Kanji spelling of his name is 上田茂) and this was simply because he believed that the quickest way to become a director was to stand out.

== Relationships ==
Ueda cites Tameo Kohanawa as his mentor for direction. Kohanawa said that when Ueda was a rookie director, he would carefully coach him on how to direct. He also cites Takashi Ikehata, Takeshi Ushigusa, Makoto Sokuza, Yūji Mutō and Shunji Yoshida as his senior directors from his time at AUBEC.

He often gets to work on Studio Deen productions, perhaps due to Studio Deen producer Keiichi Matsuda once being a junior member of AUBEC's production assistant team (he has also long been acquainted with producer Nobumitsu Urasaki of the same company).

Ueda has said that he is often mistaken for directors Shigeru Ueda (Japanese: 上田繁, Hepburn: Ueda Shigeru) and Hidehito Ueda (Japanese: うえだひでひと, Hepburn: Ueda Hidehito).

== Works ==
=== Television series ===
- Calimero (1992–1993)
- Tales of Eternia The Animation (2001)
- UFO Ultramaiden Valkyrie (2002)
- Elemental Gelade (2005)
- Mnemosyne (2008)
