= Jing =

Jing can refer to:

- Jing (software), formerly Jing Project
- Jing (name), a Chinese surname and given name
- Jing River, in China
- Jing (instrument) (징), a large gong used in Korean traditional music
- 井 (jǐng), a Chinese word for well and various other things named after the well

== Concepts ==
- Chinese classics (經; jīng)
- Jing (Chinese medicine) (精; jīng), a principle in Traditional Chinese medicine and Chinese martial arts
  - Sometimes confused with the Chinese martial arts term "jìn" (勁; "power") as in Neijin.
- Jing (Chinese opera) (净; 淨; jìng), a major male role type in Chinese opera
- Jing (philosophy) (敬; 敬; jìng), a concept in Chinese philosophy which means "respect"

== Places ==
- Jing County, Anhui, in China
- Jing County, Hebei, in China
- Jinghe County, also known as Jing County, in Xinjiang, China
- Chu (state) (楚; Chǔ), also known as Jing, in ancient China

== Fiction ==
- King of Bandit Jing, also known as Jing: King of Bandits, a seven volume manga series by Yuichi Kumakura, and the related anime
- Jing King, a character in the Sly Cooper video game series

== Others ==
- Jing people, an indigenous Vietnamese-speaking ethnic minority of China (also Kinh)
