= Kingdom (South Korean TV series) =

2019 South Korean television series

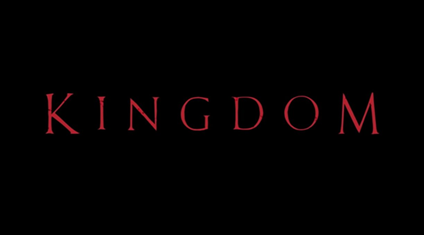
- Hangul: 킹덤
- RR: Kingdeom
- MR: K'ingdŏm
- Genre: Sageuk; Political drama; Action; Horror-thriller
- Created by: Kim Eun-hee
- Based on: The Kingdom of the Gods by: Kim Eun-hee; Yang Kyung-il
- Written by: Kim Eun-hee
- Directed by: Kim Seong-hun; Park In-je (season 2)
- Starring: Ju Ji-hoon; Bae Doona; Ryu Seung-ryong
- Music by: Mok Young-jin (season 1); Dalpalan (season 2)
- Country of origin: South Korea
- Original language: Korean
- No. of seasons: 2
- No. of episodes: 12 + 1 special

Production
- Executive producer: Lee Sang-baek
- Producer: Lee Sung-joon
- Editor: Kim Chang-ju
- Camera setup: Single-camera
- Running time: 36–56 minutes
- Production company: AStory (Note: For the two seasons only. The special episode "Kingdom: Ashin of the North" was produced by Studio Dragon, Baram Pictures, and B.A. Entertainment.)
- Budget: ₩35 billion

Original release
- Network: Netflix
- Release: January 25, 2019 – July 23, 2021

Kingdom (Korean: 킹덤) is a South Korean zombie sageuk action horror thriller series, created and written by Kim Eun-hee, based on the webtoon series The Kingdom of the Gods (Korean: 신의나라:버닝헬) by Kim Eun-hee and Yang Kyung-il. As Netflix's first original Korean series, (Note: Love Alarm was the first Korean series confirmed for pick-up by Netflix, but Kingdom was premiered first as Love Alarm was released later on August 22, 2019.) it premiered on January 25, 2019. It stars Ju Ji-hoon, Bae Doona, Ryu Seung-ryong, Kim Sang-ho, Kim Sung-kyu, and Kim Hye-jun.

Set in 1601, three years after the end of the Imjin War, Kingdom takes place in a fictional Joseon (now Korea) and blends political thriller with zombie horror. The story follows Lee Chang, the crown prince of the House of Yi, who attempts to investigate the mysterious illness recently afflicting the King, only to find himself caught in the middle of a deadly epidemic ravaging the kingdom. While trying to save the Kingdom from the plague, he must also stop his political opponents from seizing the throne.

The series was positively reviewed and renewed for a second season, which premiered March 13, 2020.

A special feature-length episode of the series, titled "Ashin of the North", was released on July 23, 2021, presenting a focus on the supporting character played by Jun Ji-hyun. The episode acts as a sidequel to the second season of Kingdom. It explores the backstory of Ashin, the mysterious character Lee Chang's group encountered on their journey north to discover the origins of the infected.

== Premise ==
=== Kingdom ===
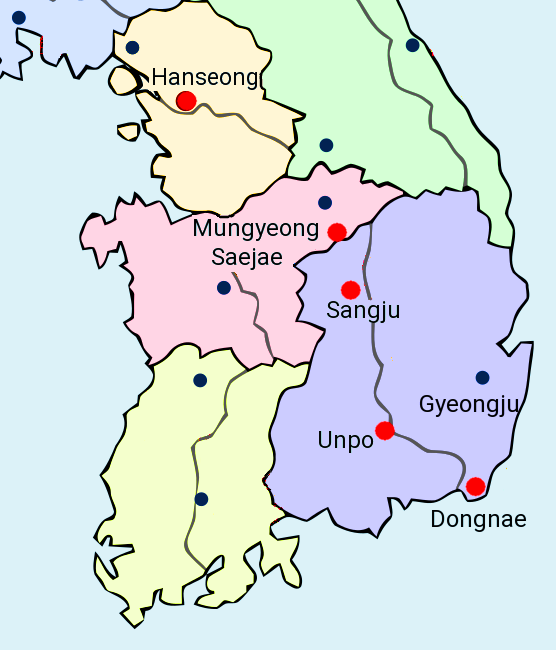
'Kingdom' locations

Set during the Joseon dynasty, three years after the conclusion of the Japanese invasions known as the Imjin War, the story follows Crown Prince Lee Chang. He, along with his subordinates, finds a zombie apocalypse is ravaging the countryside amidst a brewing political conspiracy.

=== Ashin of the North ===
Kingdom: Ashin of the North explores the backstory of a Jurchen woman named Ashin and the origin of the resurrection plant that triggered the events in Kingdom.

== Cast ==
Character	Portrayed by	Seasons		Ashin of the North
Character	Portrayed by	1	2	Ashin of the North
Main characters
Lee Chang	Ju Ji-hoon	Main	Main	
Seo-bi	Bae Doona	Main	Main	
Lord Cho Hak-ju	Ryu Seung-ryong	Main	Main	
Yeong-shin	Kim Sung-kyu	Main	Main	
Cho Beom-pal	Jeon Seok-ho	Main	Main	
Queen Consort Cho	Kim Hye-jun	Main	Main	
Mu-yeong	Kim Sang-ho	Main	Main	
Lord Ahn Hyeon	Huh Joon-ho	Main	Guest	
Ashin	Jun Ji-hyun Kim Si-a (young)		Guest	Main
Min Chi-rok	Park Byung-eun		Recurring	Main
Ai Da Gan	Koo Kyo-hwan			Main
Ta Hab	Kim Roi-ha			Main
Recurring characters
Cho Beom-il	Jung Suk-won	Recurring	Guest	Guest
Lee Seung-hui	Kwon Bum-taek	Guest		Guest
Kim Sun	Kim Jong-soo	Recurring	Recurring	
Deok Sung	Jin Seon-kyu	Recurring	Guest	
Lee Do-jin	Joo Suk-tae	Recurring	Guest	
Lee Gang-yun	Kim Tae-hoon		Recurring	

=== Main ===
- Ju Ji-hoon as Lee Chang, the Crown Prince of Joseon and heir presumptive to the throne. Although he is the King's only child, his late mother was unmarried, meaning that a son born to the queen consort would become the heir apparent and new crown prince. Suspicious of the illness afflicting the King, and his recent lack of public appearances, his investigation not only uncovers a dangerous epidemic that brings the dead back to life, but also a plot to betray the royal family and usurp him as heir.
- Bae Doona as Seo-bi, a physician from Dongnae, and one of the only two survivors of the plague's original outbreak. She desperately seeks to find a cure and comes to possess a journal containing crucial information about the disease.
- Ryu Seung-ryong as Lord Cho Hak-ju (seasons 1–2), the Chief State Councilor of Joseon, who is the head of the Haewon Cho clan and Lee Chang's political rival. He is the father of Queen Consort Cho and Cho Beom-il, and the uncle of Cho Beom-pal. A cold, ruthless leader, he is desperate to secure his power over the throne through Queen Cho's unborn child, whom he seeks to make heir to the throne in place of Lee Chang.
- Kim Sung-kyu as Yeong-shin, a mysterious tiger hunter from the South who is the only survivor of the first outbreak. A strong fighter, uniquely skilled with a novel bird gun (Joseon matchlock musket), and who shares little of his past, he allies himself with Lee Chang and helps lead the fight against the undead.
- Jeon Seok-ho as Cho Beom-pal, a magistrate of Dongnae and Cho Hak-ju's nephew, shown to have somewhat of a good nature but to be incompetent and easily scared.
- Kim Hye-jun as Queen Consort Cho (seasons 1–2), the young and pregnant queen of Joseon, and the King's primary consort. She is Cho Hak-ju's daughter, Cho Beom-il's sister and Lee Chang's stepmother. Like her father, she is desperate to secure her power over the throne by giving birth to a son who will displace Crown Prince Lee Chang as the rightful heir.
- Kim Sang-ho as Mu-yeong (seasons 1–2), Prince Chang's loyal personal bodyguard who accompanies him to the southern provinces to investigate the king's illness, leaving his pregnant wife in the capital.
- Huh Joon-ho as Lord Ahn Hyeon (regular season 1; recurring season 2), a former governor considered a war hero for his part in the Imjin War. Despite his popularity with the people, he retired from public service to live a quiet life in Sangju. He was also a mentor to the young Lee Chang.
- Jun Ji-hyun as Ashin (guest season 2; main in special), a mysterious woman from Hamgyong Province in the far north of the country.
  - Kim Si-a as young Ashin (special)
- Park Byung-eun as Min Chi-rok (recurring season 2; main in special), head of the Royal Commandery and a skilled archer who becomes suspicious of the Queen.
- Koo Kyo-hwan as Ai Da Gan (special), the Leader of the nomadic Pajeowi tribe of the Jurchen people
- Kim Roi-ha as Ta Hab (special), Ashin's father and head of the Northern Seongjeoyain tribe of the Jurchens

=== Recurring ===
- Jung Suk-won as Cho Beom-il (seasons 1–2; special), Cho-Hak-ju's son and Queen Cho's elder brother and a commander in the Royal Army.
- Kim Jong-soo as Kim Sun, Chief Scholar in Hanyang who clashes with Cho Hak-ju.
- Kwon Bum-taek as Lee Seung-hui (season 1; special), the Royal physician who attends to the King.
- Lee Yang-hee as the Minister of War: Powerful politician in Hanyang who is initially loyal to the Haewon Cho clan but finds his loyalty wavering.
- Jin Seon-kyu as Deok Sung: Ahn Hyeon's loyal right-hand man.
- Jeon Su-ji as Ashin's mother: She died when Ashin was a child.
- Joo Suk-tae as Lee Do-jin (seasons 1–2), leader of the Palace Guard who travels south to apprehend Lee Chang. He is loyal to Cho Hak-ju.
- Ahn Eun-jin as Mu-yeong's wife, who is pregnant and was put under the protection of the Haewon Cho clan.
- Kim Tae-hoon as Lee Gang-yun (season 2), head of the Royal Army, who travels south with Cho Hak-ju.
- Jo Han-chul as Won Yu (season 2), descendant of an exiled member of the royal family living a quiet life on remote island, who is sought out by Lee Chang.
- Ahn Jae-hong as Eunuch (season 2), a former eunuch who later becomes the new king's servant.
- Kim Kang-hoon as King Yi Yeom (season 2), Mu-yeong's son who was rescued from a horde of zombies as a baby by Seo-bi.

== Episodes ==
=== Series overview ===
Season	Episodes	Originally released
1	6	January 25, 2019
2	6	March 13, 2020
Special		July 23, 2021

=== Season 1 (2019) ===
No. overall	No. in season	Title	Directed by	Written by	Original release date
1	1	"Episode 1"	Kim Seong-hun	Kim Eun-hee	January 25, 2019
It has been ten days since the King of Joseon became deathly ill from smallpox. The only ones allowed to see him in his palace at the Hanyang are the Chief State Councillor Lord Cho Hak-ju, leader of the Haewon Cho clan, and his daughter, Queen Consort Cho, who is pregnant with the King's child. Seizing power, the Haewon Cho arrest and torture 89 scholars implicated in a treasonous plot to depose the King and replace him with his son, the Crown Prince Lee Chang, who is the child of the King with a concubine and thus a less legitimate heir than the unborn child of the Queen Consort. The ringleader of the conspiracy, Lee Chang himself, becomes suspicious of his father's condition and sneaks into the palace to investigate, but is caught by Cho Beom-il, the son of Lord Cho Hak-ju and brother of the Queen Consort who is a commander of the Royal Army. Lee Chang decides to flee the palace with only his trusted bodyguard Mu-yeong to track down the royal physician, and Beom-il and a platoon of soldiers are dispatched to find and arrest him. Meanwhile at the city of Dongnae, ill patients are overflowing Jiyulheon, Lee Seung-hui's clinic and there is not enough food to feed them all. The royal physician returns, with the corpse of his assistant Dan-i who was killed by an unseen monster in the king's palace. One of the patients, Yeong-shin, uses Dan-i's flesh in a stew to feed the patients and is discovered by Seo-bi, Seung-hui's assistant. All of the patients die, but are soon resurrected into flesh-eating monsters.
2	2	"Episode 2"	Kim Seong-hun	Kim Eun-hee	January 25, 2019
Lee Chang and Mu-yeong arrive at Jiyulheon only to find it barricaded and seemingly abandoned. Investigating, they discover the corpses of the patients, which are then brought to Dongnae for autopsy and funeral rites. Lee Chang and Mu-yeong learn from an herbalist in the city that Seo-bi survived the incident and track her to the Frozen Valley, a region home to what is called the resurrection plant. Meanwhile, Yeong-shin returns to Jiyulheon to find the corpses missing and hurries to Dongnae, where he is arrested by the local magistrate, Cho Beom-pal, another member of the Haewon Cho clan, under suspicion of killing the patients. Seo-bi explains to Lee Chang and Mu-yeong that the patients transformed into monstrous cannibals that apparently cannot be killed and are nocturnal, becoming active when the sun sets. The royal physician, Lee Seung-hui kept a journal documenting these changes and the events at the royal palace, which could be used as evidence. Lee Chang returns to Jiyulheon to find this journal, while Mu-yeong and Seo-bi travel to Dongnae to warn the locals. Instead, Seo-bi is arrested and imprisoned with Yeong-shin. When night falls, the corpses of the patients awaken and attack. At Jiyulheon, Lee Chang is confronted by Beom-il, and the two duel. Their fight is interrupted when the soldiers discover the corpse of Seung-hui, who attacks and infects Beom-il. Lee Chang personally witnesses the transformation and when the zombie Beom-il attacks, Chang decapitates the creature.
3	3	"Episode 3"	Kim Seong-hun	Kim Eun-hee	January 25, 2019
The zombified patients attack the inhabitants of Dongnae and the surrounding areas, spreading the plague. Seo-bi and the magistrate, Cho Beom-pal, are trapped within a locked cell in the dungeon, while Yeong-shin, Lee Chang, Mu-yeong, and other survivors take refuge throughout the night. When the sun rises, the zombies become dormant, stuffing themselves into confined spaces to avoid sunlight. Revealing himself, Lee Chang assumes command of the local soldiers and orders the zombies to be burned and an immediate quarantine of Dongnae to take place, but there are not enough surviving soldiers to carry out his orders. Reading Seung-hui's journals, Lee Chang learns that after the king perished from smallpox, Lord Cho Hak-ju ordered the royal physician to treat the corpse with the resurrection plant. However, when the king bit Seung-hui's assistant Dan-i, he merely fell ill and died instead of transforming into a zombie. Seo-bi attempted to find another of the resurrection plant in the Frozen Valley, but without the plant a cure for the infection cannot be found. Vowing revenge against the Cho clan, Lee Chang resolves to travel to Sangju to meet with Lord Ahn Hyeon, a governor and retired war hero with ties to the royal family. At the same time, the Chief Scholar Kim Sun, part of the conspiracy to depose the king, becomes suspicious of the king's disappearance and also attempts to contact Lord Hyeon. At Dongnae, Beom-pal and the other aristocrats take the only remaining boat and flee, abandoning the rest of the survivors.
4	4	"Episode 4"	Kim Seong-hun	Kim Eun-hee	January 25, 2019
On the aristocrat's boat making its way to Sangju, a noblewoman who had secretly stolen away her zombified son releases the creature, causing the nobles on ship to be overrun. At Dongnae, Lee Chang assumes command of the abandoned peasants and gives the order to seek refuge at Jiyulheon for the night. When the sun sets, an overwhelming number of zombies awaken and lay siege to the clinic. Barricading the facility, the survivors hold off the zombies until dawn. The next day, a royal army arrives declaring the arrest of Lee Chang, but was actually sent by Lord Hak-ju seeking revenge for the death of Beom-il. The soldiers begin to rain arrows on the survivors within the clinic, but are fooled by Mu-yeong and led away from the clinic while the refugees escape. Now fugitives, Lee Chang, Mu-yeong, Yeong-shin, and Seo-bi travel to Sangju. In Hanyang, the Chief Scholar Kim Sun becomes alarmed when signal fires in the south are lit and demands to speak with the king. Lord Hak-ju allows the scholar and several ministers to witness the zombified king, then reveals his knowledge of Sun's involvement in the conspiracy, ordering him to be arrested and interrogated. Warning his daughter not to get in his way, Lord Hak-ju vows to kill Lee Chang and any remaining threat to the Haewon Cho clan.
5	5	"Episode 5"	Kim Seong-hun	Kim Eun-hee	January 25, 2019
On the road, Lee Chang, Mu-yeong, Yeong-shin, and Seo-bi are unexpectedly met by Cho Beom-pal, who escaped from the cargo ship, and they travel to Sangju together. Along the way, they encounter a village whose inhabitants looted the aristocrat's boat when it ran aground, and buried the inactive zombies in a shallow grave. They go to the burial site and are attacked by the awakening zombies, but are rescued by Lord Ahn Hyeon, who is revealed to be the childhood tutor of the Crown Prince. Lord Hyeon takes the fugitives to Sangju and gives them refuge, but deflects when Lee Chang requests his aid against the Haewon Cho clan. In Hanyang, Lord Hak-ju conducts experiments to learn the mechanism of the disease by feeding the flesh of the infected to healthy prisoners. Hak-ju also gathers a number of pregnant women and widows within the palace, including Mu-yeong's wife. He then places his daughter on the throne, naming the Queen Consort Cho the Queen Regent. As her first decree, the royal Five Armies arrive at the gates at Sangju and two other locations, closing them and sealing off Gyeongsang from the rest of the peninsula to contain the disease.
6	6	"Episode 6"	Kim Seong-hun	Kim Eun-hee	January 25, 2019
At Sangju, a platoon of soldiers attempts to arrest Lee Chang. Instead, Lord Hyeon has them all executed, and warns Chang that one of his group is a mole for Lord Hak-ju. With Lord Hyeon's backing, Lee Chang assumes command of Sangju, and draws up a battle plan to fight the infected by fortifying defensible locations surrounded by water, which they know is a weakness of the zombies. Seo-bi learns that a region nearby to Sangju is named the Frozen Valley, and finds samples of the resurrection plant there. In Hanyang, the pregnant women gathered by the Cho family begin to give birth, as it is revealed that the Queen Regent is not actually with child. The soldiers in Sangju prepare for the zombie attacks on their fortifications, but night passes without incident. As they prepare to leave and rest for the day, the infected begin to arrive, as Seo-bi realizes that the zombies are not actually nocturnal, and their activity was determined by temperature instead.

=== Season 2 (2020) ===
No. overall	No. in season	Title	Directed by	Written by	Original release date
7	1	"Episode 1"	Kim Seong-hun	Kim Eun-hee	March 13, 2020
Three years prior, as the Koreans are on the verge of defeat during the Japanese invasions, Lord Cho Hak-ju learns of the resurrection plant. In the present, the defenders are caught unaware by the daytime arrival of the zombies and the fortifications are overrun. As the undead lay siege to Sangju, the defenders begin to starve. Ahn Hyeon and his men discuss how the current zombie disease is different from the one that occurred during the Japanese invasions, while Lee Chang suspects Mu-yeong of being the mole and questions him. Seo-bi and Beom-pal are cut off from Sangju and take a different gate, where they are discovered by Beom-pal's uncle, Lord Hak-ju, who takes Seo-bi back to Hanyang with him knowing that she has knowledge of the resurrection plant and the king's death. With Sangju starving, Lee Chang devises a plan to infiltrate the walls cutting off Gyeongsang with a small force and assassinate Hak-ju.
8	2	"Episode 2"	Park In-je	Kim Eun-hee	March 13, 2020
The royal contingent reaches Lord Hak-ju's camp and raids it in the night, only to fall into a trap set by Lord Hak-ju. Lee Chang is cut off from his men and met by his zombified father, while Lord Hyeon is confronted by Lord Hak-ju. Lord Hyeon defies Lord Hak-ju and is gunned down, while Lee Chang decapitates the zombie king. With this supposed proof of Lee Chang's treachery, the Haewon Cho clan consolidate their power as the Queen Regent prepares to deliver a false son, kidnapped from the pregnant women gathered. Yeong-shin and a number of Lord Hyeon's men escape from the dungeon and attempt to kill Lord Hak-ju, but fail. As the royal army prepares to execute the traitors, they are suddenly attacked by a zombified Lord Hyeon, who was turned by Seo-bi using the resurrection plant. In full view of all present, the zombie Ahn Hyeon bites Lord Hak-ju.
9	3	"Episode 3"	Park In-je	Kim Eun-hee	March 13, 2020
During the Japanese invasions of Korea, Lord Hak-ju proposes a plan to Lord Hyeon to use the resurrection plant to transform the inhabitants of a nearby village into zombies to be used against the invaders. In the present, after Lord Hak-ju is bitten, Lee Chang beheads the zombie Ahn Hyeon and gives a rallying speech to the royal army, convincing them of the Haewon Cho clan's guilt. The army begins to relieve Sangju, which is still under siege. It is revealed that after the Haewon Cho took Mu-yeong's pregnant wife, Mu-yeong became a spy under their employ. With Beom-pal, Mu-yeong takes Seo-bi and the comatose Lord Hak-ju to Hanyang. Seo-bi learns information from Beom-pal that leads her to suspect the Queen Regent, and informs Mu-yeong, but as they begin to interrogate Hak-ju, royal soldiers under Haewon Cho command arrive, seriously wound Mu-yeong, and take Seo-bi. In Hanyang, Mu-yeong's wife, the last of the pregnant women, delivers a son.
10	4	"Episode 4"	Park In-je	Kim Eun-hee	March 13, 2020
Lee Chang and his retinue catch up to the dying Mu-yeong, who tells the Crown Prince of the Queen Regent's plot. They travel to the estate where the pregnant women were held, finding Mu-yeong's wife and learn from her that the infant son was taken by the Queen. At Hanyang, the infected Hak-ju is very near death. Recalling that the zombies were unwilling to cross even the most shallow water, Seo-bi and Beom-pal submerge Hak-ju in a bathtub, and Seo-bi witnesses small worms exiting his bite wound, returning him to health. Lord Hak-ju brings Seo-bi to examine the Queen Regent Cho, confirming that Mu-yeong's infant son is not her child, but the Queen has Hak-ju poisoned to death before he can expose the plot. The Queen Regent then has Seo-bi imprisoned in a dungeon beneath the royal palace, ordering her to learn all about the zombie disease to increase her power.
11	5	"Episode 5"	Park In-je	Kim Eun-hee	March 13, 2020
At Hanyang, Lee Chang launches a surprise attack on the capital to prevent the execution of the families and of his supporters in the royal army. Many of the royalist forces defect as well, including Beom-pal who has now been made magistrate of Hanyang. Chang and his retinue confront the Queen Regent in the throne room, but she refuses to abdicate the throne, instead giving the order to unleash the zombies being held in the dungeons for experimentation throughout the palace. As most of the palace courtiers and state officials are turned, the outbreak quickly spreads beyond the possibility of containment.
12	6	"Episode 6"	Park In-je	Kim Eun-hee	March 13, 2020
The undead overrun the defenses in the royal palace, kill the Queen, and infect Mu-yeong's infant son, but Seo-bi manages to rescue the baby and escape. Lee Chang devises a plan to lure all the zombies onto the frozen pond in the rear garden and then break the surface of the ice, causing everyone to be plunged into the water. This both destroys all of the zombies as well as curing the living who were bitten. In the aftermath, Lee Chang is pressured to execute the only remaining power of the Haewon Cho clan, Mu-yeong's infant son. Instead, he enthrones the baby, making the illegitimate child the new King of Joseon. Seven years later, the still-infected but asymptomatic boy king has brought stability to the kingdom while Lee Chang, Seo-bi, and Yeong-shin continue to investigate the origins of the resurrection plant, which they learn was deliberately introduced to and spread across Korea by an unknown person. Their journey leads them to the far northern provinces, where they come across a mysterious woman.

=== Special (2021) ===
No. overall	Title	Directed by	Written by	Original release date
13	"Ashin of the North"	Kim Seong-hun	Kim Eun-hee	July 23, 2021
During the Imjin War, Ashin, a member of a Jurchen tribe living in northern Joseon, becomes the only survivor of her village of Seongjeoyain after it is massacred by the outlying Jurchen tribe of Pajeowi. Seeking revenge, she trains in a Korean military garrison while being tasked with menial jobs and is sexually abused by the soldiers. After being ordered to spy on the Pajeowi camp, she comes across her limbless father Ta Hab who, prior to the massacre, had been ordered by the Joseon commander to speak with the Pajeowi leader Ai Da Gan in order to dissuade them from invading after several Pajeowis were found brutally murdered in the Pyesa-gun forest. Ta Hab begs Ashin to kill him and, horrified at his state, she finally gives in. After setting the Pajeowi camp on fire, Ashin returns to her base and uncovers the commander's papers revealing that the villagers of Seongjeoyain were framed as the culprits of the Pyesa-gun killings in order to cover-up the culpability of Cho Beom-il, a high-ranking member of the Haewon Cho clan. In retaliation, Ashin kills several Joseon soldiers as they sleep and uses the resurrection plant to reanimate them as zombies who rampage around the camp while she kills survivors with her arrows. Using the last soldier as bait, she attracts the zombies together and then burns them, effectively killing everyone in the camp. Ashin returns to Seongjeoyain with a sack. Entering her old house, she is met by her zombified family and neighbors whom she converted using the resurrection plant after the massacre. Having fed them animals for years, she opens the sack and feeds them a live soldier. She then vows to wipe out every living thing in Joseon and among the Jurchen to avenge her village and join the undead when she is done. Ashin leaves to meet Lee Seung-hui, the Royal physician at the border in Uiji and sells him the resurrection plant. Afterwards, Ashin encounters Ai Da Gan and his army. As they approach Ashin, she fires an arrow at them.

== Production ==
=== Development ===
Netflix approached Eun-hee, after Signal ended its run, to work on a future project that she could helm. After successfully pitching the concept of the show, Netflix agreed to the proposition and committed to a series order announcement. On March 5, 2017, Netflix announced that it had given the production a series order for a first season. Alongside the series announcement, it was confirmed that Kim Seong-hun would direct the series and that Kim Eun-hee would be credited as the writer. Production companies involved with the series were slated to consist of AStory. Even before the release of the first season, Netflix announced that they would be making a second season. Filming for the second season started in February 2019, with Director Park In-je joining the production to direct its second episode and onward. In November 2020, production for a one-off special episode Kingdom: Ashin of the North was confirmed, with season one director Kim Seong-hun returning and Kim Eun-hee reprising her role as screenwriter.

The series overspent the budget, with each episode costing more than $1.78 million. As a result, the first two seasons, which were originally planned to have eight episodes each, were shortened to six episodes.

On January 16, 2018, a crew member of the art team died due to overwork. On March 14, 2019, it was confirmed that in the midst of filming the second season, a staff member in the production team died after a car accident. On January 7, 2021, a castle on the filming set of Kingdom: Ashin of the North caught fire as a staff member attempted to melt the snow using a torch lamp. Parts of the castle were destroyed in the process of extinguishing the fire, and there were no resulting injuries.

=== Writing ===
Screenwriter Kim Eun-hee began thinking about the story behind the series in 2011, wanting to reflect the fears and anxiety of modern times through the lens of the historical Joseon period. Originally, the creator thought it would be difficult to portray the story in a television series format, and instead created the webcomic The Kingdom of the Gods alongside illustrator Yang Kyung-il in 2014. While the series is adapted from the webcomic, they do not share much commonality other than their basic concepts.

Whilst working on television series, Phantom and Signal, Eun-hee continued to work on the project but encountered challenges in writing a period piece and securing investments for the project. Born out of an interest to explore opportunities for writing in a diverse range of genres and not limited by conventional choices in storytelling and censorship in publicly broadcast K-dramas, Eun-hee credited the success of Train to Busan, as the turning point for the revitalization of the interest in zombie films in the Korean media space.

In an online interview, Eun-hee stated that politics is integrated to the core of the series, noting that "It's about what politics is. Flawed politics created resentment, and there will be a consequence of gaining the plant that brings dead people to life". She added that the political environment drives many of the decisions, and propels the actions of characters in their journey, highlighting that "If we go deeper and deeper, it all boils down to politics. The pain that comes from politics, the price we have to pay for pain, they are the message that penetrates the series." Eun-hee further spoke about the importance of blending those genres and particularly focusing on the examination of the political elements covered in the series, citing that "politics and the living dead are not separate, but they rather come together as one." Adding to that, Eun-hee commented about the nature of politics, and its role in shaping the world of Kingdom. The series' portrayal of political dynamics of corruption and power highlights the disparity of growing concerns against the bourgeoise, suffering in the midst of a plague. Speaking on the conceptualization of the plague, the creator argued its role in the narrative is to serve as a reflection of the corruption, greed, inequity and injustice committed by the ruling class, using it as a camouflage to usurp the political power to maintain influence in the Kingdom of Joseon.

Eun-hee stated in an interview that she wanted to depict several themes through the use of various narrative devices in the series. She later explained that the theme of the first season was "to tell a story about hunger." Eun-hee further added that she wanted to "portray people who were mistreated by those in power struggling with starvation and poverty through the monsters". Shifting to the second season, the theme of blood was explored to "tell a story about monsters who crave blood and humans who desire a particular bloodline and lineage." Later, Eun-hee noted that a future season of Kingdom will dabble in the exploration of resentment as a theme for the basis of the new story to be told.

After Netflix ordered the special episode Kingdom: Ashin of the North, Eun-hee highlighted that the episode will mark an important bridge between the events of the first two seasons and the third season. In an interview, Eun-hee elucidated further on the reasoning behind the episode, stating that "I decided to go with a special episode because I thought it would be more interesting. We cannot leave out the story of the resurrection plant." She further added that "If the first season served as the cornerstone of the show, Kingdom: Ashin of the North, will be a stepping stone for the third season of Kingdom." In an interview with The Philippine Star, Kim Eun-hee discussed the significance of exploring the concept of Han in the special episode. Whilst the creator began to delve into the idea through the creation of Ashin's character when writing the second season, Kim Eun-hee wanted to further examine the collective trauma, grief and resentment born from the experiences of tragedy in the special episode. The writer expressed her desire in depicting Han in the story, stating that "I always wanted to write a story about the feeling of Han. And in the previous seasons, it's usually focused on the dominating power such as Prince Chang and the established people who lead the story. And then I came to think of the northern part of Joseon and the ones who are actually dominated by these people. So regardless of whether it is Joseon or another country, I think the people who are dominated have that same feeling (of Han)."

=== Filming ===
Principal photography for the first two seasons took place on location in Seoul, South Korea, including the Gyeonggi Province and North Gyeongsang Province between 2018 and 2019. Filming for Kingdom: Ashin of the North took place in Jeju Island in 2020.

=== Casting ===
Actor Song Joong-ki was courted for the lead role but declined. In September 2017, it was reported that Ju Ji-hoon, Ryu Seung-ryong, and Bae Doona were in talks to star in the series. In November 2019, it was reported that Jun Ji-hyun would star in the second season. After the announcement for the special episode, it was confirmed that Jun Ji-hyun and Park Byung-eun would reprise their respective roles in Kingdom: Ashin of the North. Additionally, it was confirmed that Kim Shi-ah, Koo Kyo-hwan and Kim Roi-ha were cast in the special episode.

Prior to the premiere of the second season, Joo Ji-hoon stated in a Forbes interview, that he signed on to star in the series, due to his faith in the project. He adds that "From the refreshing subject matter to writer Kim Eun-hee's exciting script, direction by director Kim Sung-hoon—and the cast members from season one—all these factors convinced me to continue on the journey to season two". Furthermore, he was excited at the prospect of a new director, joining the series in the second season, commenting that "Park In-je joined us for season two, and the new system of 'making a TV series with people who make films' was fascinating. The intensity is definitely higher compared to filming a two-hour film, but the actors were allowed enough time and room to prepare for filming a season that amounts to six hours, so I had faith in the outcome being of high quality."

In a press conference for Kingdom: Ashin of the North, Jun Ji-hyun revealed her experience of joining the series. The actress stated that "I was a huge fan of Kingdom. When I met with the writer [Kim Eun-hee] in a private setting before I was offered the role, I told her I was willing to even appear as a zombie in Kingdom. I am so thankful that she gave me such a big role." She later stated that after reading the screenplay for the special episode, "I was thrilled at the thought that I could start the big story."

== Reception ==
=== Season 1 ===
The first season received critical acclaim from critics and the audience. On the review aggregator website Rotten Tomatoes, 94% of 17 critics' reviews are positive, with an average rating of 8.2/10. The website's consensus reads: "An enthralling blend of blood, terror, and political intrigue, Kingdom is a refreshing addition to the zombie landscape." The series is praised by critics for its blend of the political thriller, historical drama and horror genres.

Aloysius Low of CNET praised the cinematography of the first season, stating that "shots cleverly linger on certain scenes to draw out the impressive sets, while adeptly tracking the action during sword fights or zombie attacks." Renaldo Matadeen from CBR mentioned in a positive review of the first season, that "Kingdom makes even bolder sociopolitical statements than The Walking Dead does. Sure, the AMC series waxes on about class and elitism, but Kingdom wades deep into governance and the divide between the rulers and the suffering populace." Jonathan Christian from The Playlist complimented the series by adding that "this series is risky programming for people who appreciate the unusual, gory, but imaginative, things in life. Considering the over-saturated state of the market, it is refreshing to see Netflix taking chances." Joel Keller from News AU recommended the first season in their review of the series by stating that "Kingdom dares to show that zombies aren't just a 20th and 21st-century phenomenon, and we applaud that kind of creative storytelling."

While reviewing the first season, Kate Sanchez from But Why Tho? declared in a positive review that "Kingdom offers a period drama, a zombie show, and a tense atmosphere that will keep you watching until you're done with this season. In an over-saturated sub-genre, this show takes common horror tropes and rewrites zombie rules for Joseon Korea in a way that reinvigorates my love of the sub-genre." Michael Pementel from Bloody Disgusting praised the series, stating that "Kingdom is by far one of the most compelling works to come out of the zombie genre" and further adding that "thanks to strong acting, gripping action and drama, gruesome visuals, and an overall powerful narrative, Kingdom is a must watch for horror fans."

=== Season 2 ===
On the review aggregator website Rotten Tomatoes, 100% of 10 critics' reviews are positive, with an average rating of 8.4/10.

Jorge Loser from Espinof wrote that, "Kingdom avoids unnecessary fillers in the story, and leaves a consistency in its spine that makes it worthy." Sol Harris from Starburst praised the second season, stating that it is "a true roller-coaster of a thrill-ride, balancing nail-biting zombie carnage with the sword-based military action of countless samurai movies with a handful of darkly comedic moments that would make Sam Raimi proud." Kevin Lever of Tell-Tale TV gave the second season a very positive review, writing: "the most important thing about Kingdom remains absolutely, undeniably riveting. The political intrigue is certainly exciting when the outbreak is its backdrop, the future of the country at risk when leadership is most needed." He said further that the season, "continues the greatness of the first season and delivers a satisfying, bloody good time." Rafael Motamayor from GameSpot recommended the second season in his review by highlighting that, "Not to be outdone by Game of Thrones, Kingdom also serves as an intriguing courtroom thriller", further praising the narrative, by adding that it "doubles down on the viral aspect of the zombie outbreak, exploring its natural origin, how it spreads, and most frighteningly, how it evolves."

The New York Times named Kingdom one of "The Best International Shows of 2020." Following Netflix's reporting on the considerable success that Kingdom obtained globally after it was made available to stream on their platform service, Eun-hee stated in response that "I could never have imagined the popularity [Kingdom got]. I did my best to make it as Korean as possible because I wanted people to see it and become more curious about Korea."

== Release ==
On December 17, 2018, the official trailer for the series was released. On January 25, 2019, the first season of the series, consisting of six episodes, was released for streaming on Netflix. The second season, also consisting of six episodes, was released on March 13, 2020. A special 92-minute episode, titled "Kingdom: Ashin of the North", was released on July 23, 2021.

== Accolades ==
=== Awards and nominations ===
Award	Category	Recipient(s)	Result	Ref.
56th Baeksang Arts Awards	Best Drama	Kingdom	Nominated	
56th Baeksang Arts Awards	Technical Award	Kim Nam-sik, Ryu Gun-hee (Visual Effects)	Nominated	
2nd Asia Contents Awards	Best Drama	Kingdom	Nominated	
2nd Asia Contents Awards	Best Actor	Ju Ji-hoon	Won	
2nd Asia Contents Awards	Best Writer	Kim Eun-hee	Won	
2nd Asia Contents Awards	Technical Award	Visual Effects, Make Up, Costume Design, Sound Effects	Won	

=== Listicles ===
Name of publisher, year listed, name of listicle, and placement
Publisher	Year	Listicle	Placement	Ref.
Entertainment Weekly	2025	The 21 best Korean shows on Netflix to watch now	Top 21	
