= Signal (Japanese TV series) =

2018 Japanese television drama series

- Promotional poster
- シグナル (Shigunaru)
- Genre: Procedural; Drama; Thriller
- Created by: Fuji TV
- Based on: Signal by Kim Eun-hee (Note: Both versions of Signal and the 2016 US TV series Frequency originate from the 2000 film of the same name by Toby Emmerich)
- Written by: Masaya Ozaki
- Directed by: Akira Uchikata; Kosuke Suzuki
- Starring: Kentaro Sakaguchi; Michiko Kichise; Kazuki Kitamura
- Opening theme: "Don't Leave Me" by BTS
- Composers: Yuki Hayashi; Asami Tachibana
- Country of origin: Japan
- Original language: Japanese
- No. of episodes: 10

Production
- Producers: Takashi Hagiwara; Takahiro Kasabe; Mai Ishida
- Camera setup: Single camera
- Production companies: Kansai Telecasting Corporation; Horipro

Original release
- Network: Fuji TV
- Release: April 10 – June 12, 2018

Related
- Signal the Movie (2021); Signal (2016)

Signal (Japanese: シグナル, Hepburn: Shigunaru), also known as Signal: Long-Term Unsolved Case Investigation Team (Japanese: シグナル 長期未解決事件捜査班, Hepburn: Shigunaru: Chōki Mikaiketsu Jiken Sōsahan), is a Japanese police procedural television series starring Kentaro Sakaguchi, Michiko Kichise and Kazuki Kitamura. It is a remake of the South Korean drama of the same name written by Kim Eun-hee and aired every Tuesday at 21:00 JST from April 10 to June 12, 2018, on Fuji TV.

A sequel film, Signal the Movie, was released in theaters in Japan on April 2, 2021.

== Cast ==
=== Main ===
- Kentaro Sakaguchi as Kento Saegusa
- Michiko Kichise as Misaki Sakurai
- Kazuki Kitamura as Takeshi Ooyama

=== Supporting ===
*Atsuro Watabe as Tsutomu Yamada
- Yuichi Kimura as Tsutomu Yamada
- Tetsuhiro Ikeda as Shinya Kojima
- Masahiro Komoto as Kazuo Iwata
- Kaede Aono as Rika Anzai
- Fuju Kamio as Ryota Kato
- Yuito Obara as Yōichi Ogawa

== Original soundtrack ==
Boy group BTS from South Korea sang the opening theme song of the series entitled "Don't Leave Me".

Title	Year	Artist	Peak chart positions					Sales
Title	Year	Artist	KOR	FRA Digital	JPN		US World	Sales
Title	Year	Artist	KOR	FRA Digital	Oricon	Hot 100	US World	Sales
"Don't Leave Me"	2018	BTS	—	91	18	13	1	JPN: 4,611; US: 9,000
"—" denotes releases that did not chart or were not released in that region.

== Ratings ==
Ep.	Broadcast date	Average audience share		
Ep.	Broadcast date	Kanto region	Kansai region	Ref.
1	April 10, 2018	9.7%	12.9%	
2	April 17, 2018	8.4%	14.3%	
3	April 24, 2018	8.3%	11.9%	
4	May 1, 2018	7.9%	13.0%	
5	May 8, 2018	6.7%	11.6%	
6	May 15, 2018	5.7%	9.7%	
7	May 22, 2018	6.9%	10.1%	
8	May 29, 2018	6.9%	10.3%	
9	June 5, 2018	7.3%	11.4%	
10	June 12, 2018	9.2%	13.5%	
Average		7.7%	11.9%	

== International broadcast ==
Country	Network	Premiere
Indonesia; Mongolia; Myanmar; Singapore; Sri Lanka; Taiwan; Vietnam	WakuWaku Japan (with subtitles)	April 21, 2018

== Film ==
A sequel film, simply titled Signal the Movie, was released in Japan on April 2, 2021. The film was directed by Hajime Hashimoto, co-written by Kōsuke Nishi and Hiroshi Hayashi, and distributed by Toho, with cast members from the television series reprising their respective roles.
