= Romantics Anonymous (TV series) =

2025 Japanese television series

- Netflix release poster

Japanese name
- Kanji: 匿名の恋人たち
- Genre: Romantic comedy
- Based on: Romantics Anonymous by: Jean-Pierre Améris; Philippe Blasband
- Developed by: Park So-yeon
- Written by: Kim Ji-hyun
- Screenplay by: Yoshikazu Okada
- Directed by: Sho Tsukikawa
- Starring: Shun Oguri; Han Hyo-joo; Yuri Nakamura; Jin Akanishi
- Music by: Dalpalan
- Opening theme: "Confession" (Japanese version) by Kim Chaewon
- Country of origin: Japan
- Original languages: Japanese; Korean
- No. of episodes: 8

Production
- Executive producer: Syd Lim
- Producers: Kim Yong-eun; Choi Gi-young; Kim Keum-sil; Takuro Nagai; Mao Osaki
- Cinematography: Kosuke Yamada
- Editor: Yang Jin-mo
- Running time: 39-57 minutes
- Production companies: Yong Film; Yong Film Japan; Riki Project

Original release
- Network: Netflix
- Release: 16 October 2025

Romantics Anonymous (Japanese: 匿名の恋人たち) is a 2025 Japanese romantic comedy television series based on the 2010 French-Belgian film of the same name by Jean-Pierre Améris and Philippe Blasband. Directed by Sho Tsukikawa, it stars Shun Oguri, Han Hyo-joo, Yuri Nakamura, and Jin Akanishi. The series follows a talented chocolatier who begins working at a small chocolate store despite her extreme shyness, which makes daily life challenging.

The first two episodes of the Romantics Anonymous premiered at the 30th Busan International Film Festival in the On Screen section on September 19, 2025. The series was released globally on Netflix on October 16. It garnered positive reviews and successful viewership, immediately rising to number one on Netflix's Japanese series chart, as well as ranking within the Top 10 in thirteen countries globally.

== Synopsis ==
A man and a woman meet by chance and bond over their love for chocolate. Both live with different types of anxiety; the man feels uncomfortable touching others, and the woman finds it hard to look people in the eye. These challenges make their growing relationship both difficult and sweet.

== Cast ==
- Shun Oguri as Sosuke Fujiwara, director of chocolate shop 'Le Sauveur' and the son of a major confectionery magnate
- Han Hyo-joo as Hana Lee, a gifted chocolatier
- Yuri Nakamura as Irene, a renowned psychologist and author
- Jin Akanishi as Hiro Takada, owner of the bar 'Brush'
- Ryo Narita as Takashi Fujiwara, Sosuke’s cousin
- Ayumi Ito as Motomi Kawamura, Le Sauveur’s chief chocolatier
- Sayaka Yamaguchi as Kiyomi Hosen
- Mieko Harada
- Meiko Kaji as Ritsuko Saegusa
- Eiji Okuda as Kenji Kuroiwa, the owner of Le Sauveur
- Koichi Sato as Shuntaro Fujiwara, Sosuke’s father and the chairman of Futago Confectionery
- Shima Ise as Sumiko Yamaoka
- Keiichiro Azuma as Wataru Shimizu
- Koya Fukuda
- Shiori Akita as Nako Ueno
- Ikuho Akiya as Takuya Sawakita
- Takato Yonemoto as Kuma

Kentaro Sakaguchi and Song Joong-ki made a cameo appearance with the former as a counselor guest.

== Production ==
On March 13, 2024 it was reported that Han Hyo-joo would join the cast of the series as the main lead opposite Shun Oguri.

On May 31, 2024 in a press release Netflix officially announced the production of a new romance series from Japan with cast and crew from Japan and South Korea.

Principal photography of the series began in the early March 2024, planned and produced by Yong Film.

== Release ==
Romantics Anonymous was selected for the 'On Screen' section at the 30th Busan International Film Festival, where the first two episodes of the series were screened on September 19, 2025. On October 16, the series was made available to stream on Netflix globally.

== Reception ==
Within two days of its release, Romantic Anonymous ranked fourth on Netflix Korea’s Top 10 series chart as of October 18, 2025. Netflix reported that Romantics Anonymous was the no. 6 TV show in their Top 10 non-English language series for the week of October 13 to October 19. Within just a few days of arriving on the platform, the remake garnered 13.5 million hours viewed from 2.1 million viewers. The series was most well received in Japan, peaking at number one on the series chart and also charting within the Top 10 in thirteen countries worldwide.

== Original soundtrack ==
Romantics Anonymous

Soundtrack album by Dalpalan
- Released: 2025
- Genre: Soundtrack
- Length: 53:00
- Language: Korean; English
- Label: FUGA; Netflix Music

Released on September 19, 2025
No.	Title	Artist	Length
1.	"Confession" (Japanese version)	Kim Chaewon, Dalpalan	3:59
2.	"Memory of My Skin"		4:30
3.	"Butterfly Hug"		2:36
4.	"Romantics Anonymous"		3:14
5.	"After Losing My Mother"		1:50
6.	"Unknown Heart"		1:55
7.	"Unpromised Journey"		4:21
8.	"Shirt in the Bag"		1:35
9.	"Will We Be Able to Meet Properly"		2:51
10.	"Tell Your Story in the Anonymous Circle"		1:24
11.	"It’s Snowing Outside"		1:12
12.	"Situational Drama in a Circle"		1:40
13.	"Lavender Farm"		2:33
14.	"Picturesque Lake"		4:56
15.	"What You Saw Was a Mistake"		2:38
16.	"I Don't Want to Get Caught"		3:28
17.	"Chocolate Like Your Heart"		1:57
18.	"Your Support"		2:18
19.	"Our Time a Little While Ago"		3:34
20.	"Another Story Begins"		0:52
