= Men's Non-no =

Japanese men's fashion magazine

- July 2017 cover with Kentaro Sakaguchi
- Categories: Fashion, lifestyle
- Frequency: Monthly
- Publisher: Shueisha
- Founded: 1986
- Country: Japan
- Based in: Tokyo
- Language: Japanese
- Website: Men's Non-no

Men's Non-no (メンズノンノ) is a Japanese monthly men's fashion and lifestyle magazine based in Tokyo. Published by Shueisha, it is an offshoot of women's magazine Non-no.

== History ==
Men's Non-no was started in 1986, and the first issue appeared in 1987. The magazine is headquartered in Tokyo and published monthly by Shueisha. Although the monthly is mostly read by young men and university students, its readers also include females. The magazine covers articles on lifestyle, music and football with a special reference to fashion. It has recurring models from different racial backgrounds. It also features young male celebrities. In 1999 the circulation of Men's Non-no was 370,000 copies.

== Notable exclusive models ==
=== Former ===
- Hiroshi Abe
- Shosuke Tanihara
- Kentaro Sakaguchi
