= Signal the Movie =

2021 film by Hajime Hashimoto

- Theatrical release poster
- Kanji: 劇場版シグナル 長期未解決事件捜査班
- Revised Hepburn: Gekijōban Shigunaru: Chōki Mikaiketsujiken Sōsahan
- Directed by: Hajime Hashimoto
- Screenplay by: Kōsuke Nishi; Hiroshi Hayashi
- Based on: Signal by Kim Eun-hee
- Produced by: Takashi Hagiwara; Yoko Toyofuku; Kazutaka Obara; Takahiro Kasagi; Mai Ishida
- Starring: Kentaro Sakaguchi; Michiko Kichise; Kazuki Kitamura; Yuichi Nakamura; Tetsuhiro Ikeda; Kaede Aono; Tetta Sugimoto; Nao; Tetsushi Tanaka; Takeshi Kaga; Tsuyoshi Ihara
- Cinematography: Hiroo Yanagida
- Edited by: Shinya Tadano
- Music by: Yuki Hayashi; Asami Tachibana
- Production companies: Kansai Telecasting Corporation; Fuji TV; Tristone Pictures; Dentsu; Toho Co., Ltd.; FNS26 Company
- Distributed by: Toho Co., Ltd.
- Release date: April 2, 2021
- Running time: 122 minutes
- Country: Japan
- Language: Japanese

Signal the Movie (Note: Japanese: 劇場版シグナル 長期未解決事件捜査班, Hepburn: Gekijōban Shigunaru: Chōki Mikaiketsujiken Sōsahan; lit. "Theatrical Feature Signal: Long-Term Unsolved Case Investigation Team") is a 2021 Japanese police procedural thriller drama film directed by Hajime Hashimoto and co-written by Kōsuke Nishi and Hiroshi Hayashi; the film is based on a television series with a same name by Akira Uchitaka and Kosuke Suzuki, which in turn is a remake of a South Korean television series with a same name by Kim Eun-hee. Distributed by Toho, it continues from where the television series had left off, as Kento Saegura, Misaki Sakurai and Takeshi Ooyama investigate mysterious car accidents occurring in both past and present era. Kentaro Sakaguchi, Michiko Kichise, Kazuki Kitamura, Yuichi Nakamura, Tetsuhiro Ikeda and Kaede Aono reprises their roles from the television series, with Tetta Sugimoto, Nao, Tetsushi Tanaka, Takeshi Kaga and Tsuyoshi Ihara joining the ensemble cast. It was released in Japan on April 2, 2021.

== Premise ==
"In 2021, a limousine taxi driver causes an accident on a highway and a high-level government official dies in the accident. Cold case investigation team, including Kento Saegusa and team leader Misaki Sakurai, have doubts about the case.

Meanwhile, in 2009, administrative officers die consecutively in car accidents. The police announce these deaths as accidents. Takeshi Ooyama believes that these deaths were not the product of simple accidents. At 11:23 PM, a walkie-talkie turns on and makes a connection between the future and past. Kento Saegusa and Takeshi Ooyama face the threat of bioterrorism."

== Cast ==
- Kentaro Sakaguchi as Kento Saegusa
- Michiko Kichise as Misaki Sakurai
- Kazuki Kitamura as Takeshi Ooyama
- Yuichi Kimura as Tsutomu Yamada
- Tetsuhiro Ikeda as Shinya Kojima
- Kaede Aono as Rika Anzai
- Tetta Sugimoto as Munehisa Mitani
- Nao as Michiru Koizumi
- Tetsushi Tanaka as Satoshi Yamazaki
- Takeshi Kaga as Shinjiro Itagaki
- Tsuyoshi Ihara as Junki Aoki

== Production ==
In January 2020, it was announced that Signal television series would receive a film adaptation, and Hajime Hashimoto would direct the film. The film featured a brand new story that was not present in the South Korean television series or any adaptations prior. Cast members from the television series reprised their respective roles for the film. The principal photography took place from January to February 2020.

Yuki Hayashi and Asami Tachibana returned to co-compose the music for the film. South Korean boy band BTS also returned to provide the theme song for the film, titled "Film Out".

== Release ==
The film was released in Japan on April 2, 2021.

== Reception ==
=== Critical reception ===
James Marsh from South China Morning Post gave a mixed review, stating "Existing fans of the television show will doubtless already have their tickets booked for this frantic and fitfully entertaining continuation, but curious parties approaching Signal the Movie for the first time will be better served seeking out the small screen series first – or even the superior Korean incarnation, both of which are streaming on Netflix."

Mark Schilling from The Japan Times praised the action sequences, stating "This cop thriller based on a 2018 Fuji TV series may be gimmicky, but it delivers in the action department."
