= Sho Tsukikawa =

Japanese film director (born 1982)

- 月川翔
- Born: August 5, 1982 (age 44); Tokyo, Japan
- Occupation: Director

Sho Tsukikawa (月川翔; born August 5, 1982) is a Japanese director. In addition to directing and writing for films and television dramas, he also works on music videos and commercials.

He completed his graduate studies at the School of Film and New Media at the Tokyo University of the Arts.

In 2009, he won the Jury Grand Prix at the Louis Vuitton Journeys Awards, where the jury included Wong Kar-wai and Sofia Coppola.

He directed Netflix's YuYu Hakusho, the live-action adaptation of the popular Japanese manga and anime of the same name. His second Netflix collaboration was the Japanese-South Korean drama Romantics Anonymous.

== Filmography ==
=== Film ===
Year(s)	Title	Ref.
2011	Cheerfu11y	
2016	Defying Kurosaki-kun	
2017	Let Me Eat Your Pancreas	
2017	The 100th Love with You	
2018	My Teacher, My Love	
2018	My Little Monster	
2018	Hibiki: Shōsetsuka ni Naru Hōhō	
2019	You Shine in the Moonlit Night	
2019	And Life Goes On	
2024	Dear Family	

=== Television ===
Year(s)	Title	Ref.
2013	Minna! ESPer Dayo!	
2023	YuYu Hakusho	
2025	Romantics Anonymous	

=== Music video ===
- "Keitai Denwa", RADWIMPS, 2010
