= YuYu Hakusho (2023 TV series) =

Japanese action adventure television series

- Promotional poster
- Genre: Action; Adventure; Comedy drama; Fantasy
- Based on: YuYu Hakusho by Yoshihiro Togashi
- Developed by: Akira Morii; Kaata Sakamoto
- Written by: Tatsurō Mishima
- Directed by: Sho Tsukikawa
- Starring: Takumi Kitamura; Jun Shison; Kanata Hongō; Shuhei Uesugi
- Music by: Yutaka Yamada
- Country of origin: Japan
- Original language: Japanese
- No. of episodes: 5

Production
- Executive producer: Kaata Sakamoto
- Producer: Akira Morii
- Cinematography: Kosuke Yamada
- Editor: Junnosuke Hogaki
- Running time: 45–56 minutes
- Production companies: Robot Communications; The Seven (cooperation)

Original release
- Network: Netflix
- Release: December 14, 2023 – present

YuYu Hakusho (Japanese: 幽☆遊☆白書, Hepburn: YūYū Hakusho) is a Japanese action fantasy adventure television series developed by Akira Morii and Kaata Sakamoto for Netflix. The series is a live-action adaptation of the 1990–1994 manga series of the same name by Yoshihiro Togashi. It is produced by Robot Communications, and stars Takumi Kitamura, Jun Shison, Kanata Hongō and Shuhei Uesugi. The first season premiered on December 14, 2023, and received praise for its action and fight scenes, but was criticized for the plot condensing required to fit five episodes. In August 2026, a second season had been greenlit.

== Premise ==
The story revolves around Yusuke Urameshi, a delinquent senior high school student who spends his days getting into fights. He dies after saving a child in a car accident, and gets resurrected to serve as an investigator of the supernatural.

== Cast ==
- Takumi Kitamura as Yusuke Urameshi
- Shuhei Uesugi as Kazuma Kuwabara
- Jun Shison as Kurama
- Kanata Hongō as Hiei
- Sei Shiraishi as Keiko Yukimura
- Kotone Furukawa as Botan
- Ai Mikami as Yukina
- Hiroya Shimizu as Karasu
- Keita Machida as Koenma
- Meiko Kaji as Genkai
- Ayumi Ito as Atsuko Urameshi
- Kenichi Takitō as Elder Toguro
- Go Ayano as Younger Toguro
- Goro Inagaki as Sakyo

== Episodes ==
No.	Directed by	Written by	Original release date
1	Sho Tsukikawa	Tatsurō Mishima	December 14, 2023
17-year-old Yusuke Urameshi discovers that he is a ghost after being killed saving a young boy from being hit by an out-of-control driver. Four hours earlier, Yusuke is a delinquent but saves a boy at his school from bullies. However, he is accused of being a bully and leaves school. A sinkhole is shown with a tiny creature emerging from it, which is from the Demon World. This creature infects the driver of the truck which kills Yusuke. Yusuke is offered the chance to be resurrected if he agrees to be a Spirit Detective, which he does after learning his best friend, Keiko, has guilt over his death. Yusuke learns that the boy from his school that he saved earlier is now infected by a similar Demon World creature. He must save him before he turns into an evil creature. Using his Spirit Energy, Yusuke saves the boy. His next mission is to retrieve three relics that fall into the hands of a trio of yokai.
2	Sho Tsukikawa	Tatsurō Mishima	December 14, 2023
Yusuke encounters the first thief, Goki, who possesses the Rapacious Orb, which allows him to steal children's souls that he feeds on. Yusuke gets into a fight with Goki and ultimately uses his Spirit Energy to defeat him, returning the souls to the children. Yusuke then encounters the second thief, Kurama, who possesses the Mirror of Darkness, which enables its users to have any wish they want, but they must pay with their own life. Kurama makes his wish (to save his human mother who is dying) but Yusuke jumps into the mirror with him and gives half his life to save Kurama so that Kurama's mother will not cry over his death, like his own mother did over his. Kuwabara, who is Yusuke's classmate and delinquent rival, can see all the supernatural things that Yusuke does. The third thief, Hiei, who stole the Conjuring Blade, which grants the user their desired ability, uses the blade to give himself a third eye. He uses the third eye and a Tear of Ice to find a second Tear of Ice that came from an imprisoned Korime.
3	Sho Tsukikawa	Tatsurō Mishima	December 14, 2023
Yusuke is bested by Hiei, who leaves him alive. Tarukane, the man who sold the sinkhole land to billionaire Sakyo in exchange for the Korime then relocates to Sakyo's fortified island for safety. Sakyo assigns the Toguro brothers as personal guards to protect Tarukane, who is being hunted by Hiei. It is revealed that the imprisoned Korime is Hiei's younger sister, Yukina. Yusuke and Kuwabara begin training with Master Genkai. Yusuke's Spirit Energy grows and Kuwabara also learns to use it and form a Spirit Sword. Genkai gives Yusuke the Spirit Wave Orb. Younger Toguro, a yokai and former colleague of Genkai, fights and kills her. Sakyo attempts to make a large rift in the sinkhole barrier between the Demon World and the Human World. Elder Toguro kidnaps Keiko, and Kurama discovers that she and Hiei's sister are being held at Sakyo's island fortress. Kurama, Hiei, Yusuke, and Kuwabara team up and head to the island to rescue them.
4	Sho Tsukikawa	Tatsurō Mishima	December 14, 2023
Hiei and Kurama fight yokai Bui and Karasu, respectively, while rich humans that Sakyo invited to the island bet on the outcomes. Yusuke and Kuwabara continue searching for Yukina and Keiko. Yukina heals a wound on Keiko's hand and tells her that not all yokai are evil. Keiko feigns illness and incapacitates a guard who checks on her, escaping with Yukina. Hiei and Kurama win their battles but are both seriously injured. Kuwabara finds Yukina and Keiko and begins to fight Elder Toguro, who can regenerate any part of his body. Sakyo tells Yusuke he will release Keiko if he can best Younger Toguro, the yokai that killed Genkai. Sakyo succeeds in opening a wormhole to the Demon World through the sinkhole.
5	Sho Tsukikawa	Tatsurō Mishima	December 14, 2023
Koenma creates a shield barrier around the sinkhole to prevent demons from reaching the Human World and makes a bet with Sakyo; if his group bests Younger Toguro, then Sakyo will close the rift. Hiei, Kurama, and Kuwabara arrive to help Yusuke fight Younger Toguro, who attacks his older brother. Yukina heals Kuwabara's mortal injury. Younger Toguro is defeated by Yusuke's Spirit Gun. The bet lost, Sakyo closes the rift and dies by suicide. In a mid-credits scene, Elder Toguro is shown to be alive, but only his severed head struggling to regenerate, on a beach.

== Production ==
=== Development ===
Season 1

A Japanese live-action adaptation of Yoshihiro Togashi's YuYu Hakusho manga was announced by Netflix on December 16, 2020. Netflix contents acquisition director Kaata Sakamoto serves as executive producer and Akira Morii produced the series at Robot. Netflix signed a multi-year contract with Toho Studios to lease two of their Tokyo stage facilities, and YuYu Hakusho is their first production there. On July 15, 2022, it was reported that Sho Tsukikawa would serve as series director, with Tatsurō Mishima handling the scripts and Ryō Sakaguchi serving as the visual effects (VFX) supervisor. Tsukikawa, who was a fan of the original series as a child, felt that combining the entertaining aspects with the story's serious themes would make for an interesting live-action series. Togashi gave Netflix and the showrunners creative freedom; Sakamoto said the original creator's only request was for them "to ensure a great quality adaptation." Tsukikawa stated that there was an initial idea to tell the story of YuYu Hakusho in three seasons, "But realistically, we didn't know how long that was going to take, so we ended up doing five episodes and just showing part of the long, epic story".

According to Sakamoto, the show took almost five years to complete; two years of pre-production, more than 10 months of filming, and another two years for post-production. The show's creators revealed that because YuYu Hakusho's fantasy premise and supernatural action make it a VFX-heavy title, production companies were afraid to take on the project. Even when Tsukikawa was brought on board, he thought it would be an impossible project to materialize. Due to the large amount of VFX, eight such companies worldwide contributed to the show. According to Morii, "Japanese creators have the vision and knowledge on how to do these VFX but they had no experience, so this was the first time they went through this top-class VFX process." Sakaguchi revealed that the Toguro brothers proved especially difficult as they had to integrate CGI with the two actors' real-life acting and facial expressions; "We could have done it differently, but it was very important for the director that the actors' performances drove everything in the show."

Season 2

According to Tokyo Sports, the series was reportedly returning for a second season, with filming scheduled to begin in the fall. The upcoming season is set to cover the remaining portion of the story, concluding with the Demon World Unification Tournament arc.

=== Casting ===
Season 1

On casting, Morii said they looked for actors who could capture what was great about the characters in the original manga and in their script, "It doesn't necessarily mean that they need to look exactly like the characters. Instead, we tried to look for people who could portray and capture the essence of the characters." In July 2022, Netflix announced the series would star Takumi Kitamura as Yusuke Urameshi, Shuhei Uesugi as Kazuma Kuwabara, Jun Shison as Kurama, and Kanata Hongō as Hiei. Kitamura said he studied and took aspects from both the manga and its anime adaptation, such as the way Yusuke walks and how much of a stride he has. He remarked how a delinquent character like Yusuke could come off as outdated, so he had to put some "modern twists" on the character. Kitamura also noted how there is an age difference from the original, as Yusuke is aged-up from a junior high school student to a high school senior. Uesugi said he was asked to gain 14 kilograms (31 lb) or 15 kilograms (33 lb) for the role of Kuwabara.

Season 2

Kitamura was slated to reprise his role, alongside newly announced cast members Shun Oguri, Nobuaki Kaneko, Mirai Moriyama, and Mizuki Yamamoto portraying inhabitants of the demon world.

== Release ==
Netflix screened the first episode of YuYu Hakusho to an estimated 5,000 people at the Ariake Arena in Tokyo, Japan on December 13, 2023. According to Zoe Leung of Hypebeast, this made it the streaming service's biggest world premiere event to date. The entire five-episode series premiered on Netflix on December 14, 2023.

A Tagalog dub was released in the Philippines on December 14, 2023, under the title Ghost Fighter. The Tagalog dub of the anime, which had the same title, became popular with children in that country in the 1990s. As of December 2023 the TV series became the most streamed series on the Philippines version of Netflix. The Philippines version uses the original Japanese character names.

== Reception ==
=== Critical response ===
Review aggregator Metacritic reported that YuYu Hakusho holds a weighted average score of 70 out of 100, based on 4 critics, indicating "generally favorable reviews". Joshua Kristian McCoy of Game Rant praised YuYu Hakusho as one of the best live-action adaptations of a manga or anime series, placing it alongside the Rurouni Kenshin films. Although noting that the plot condensing erases much of the original manga's nuance, leaving emotional moments little time to breathe, McCoy called it a "solid action/horror/drama in its own right" that is designed to steer newcomers toward the source material. IGN's Juan Barquin called the show a delightful retelling, albeit condensed, that manages to capture the tone and characterization that makes the original "so charming". He praised the excellent characterization of the core duo of Yusuke and Kuwabara, but found Mishima's scripting falters when it comes to the supporting characters due to the pacing required of a five-episode series. Daniel Dockery of Polygon also found the Netflix adaptation to effectively capture the wild tonal shifts and the characters that has made the franchise adored for the last 33 years, but said its length does a disservice to some crucial moments. He called Yu Yu Hakusho one of the few series of its kind to "actually kinda make you feel bad for how fist-pumpingly cool the battles are", as it darts from a spirited contest between warriors into the psychological ramifications of pursuing such battles.

Ash Parrish of The Verge praised the performances of Kitamura and Uesugi, as well as the "authentic" and well-choreographed action sequences. A fan of the YuYu Hakusho anime adaptation, Parrish understood why Netflix chose the plot points that they did, but found the condensing of the story into five hour-long episodes left "characters that are formless, uninteresting seat-fillers" in high school production-quality costumes. In a critical review, Tokyo Weekender's Cezary Jan Strusiewicz found the show "very dark. Not just tonally like the manga and anime, but also color-wise". Labeling original creator Yoshihiro Togashi a master of weaving together serious plot and tear-jerking character moments with wacky cartoon humor, Strusiewicz felt Netflix doubled-down on the darkness and drama, but "when you pair that with a character shooting demons with his magical finger gun, the effect is comical in all the wrong ways." Although he called the show "disappointing", Strusiewicz wrote that one must give credit to the "phenomenal" action scenes.

=== Viewership ===
Netflix announced that YuYu Hakusho was number one on its list of non-English-language rankings in its first week of release, with 7.7 million total views and 32.1 million hours viewed. It ranked in the top 10 in 76 countries, and ranked number one in seven of them. According to Tadashi Sudo of Animation Business Journal, this is the first time in Netflix's history that a Japanese production has topped the non-English rankings. It remained at number one for its second week, when it also ranked number five out of all Netflix shows globally.

=== Accolades ===
Name of the award ceremony, year presented, category, nominee of the award, and the result of the nomination
Award ceremony	Year	Category	Nominee / Work	Result	Ref.
Asia Contents Awards & Global OTT Awards	2024	Best Visual Effects	YuYu Hakusho	Nominated	
