= Beyond Goodbye =

2024 Japanese television series

- Promotional poster
- Sayonara no Tsuzuki (さよならのつづき)
- Genre: Drama
- Created by: Netflix
- Developed by: Telepack
- Written by: Yoshikazu Okada
- Directed by: Hiroshi Kurosaki
- Starring: Kasumi Arimura; Kentaro Sakaguchi; Yuri Nakamura; Toma Ikuta
- Ending theme: "Azalea" by Kenshi Yonezu
- Composer: Aska Matsumiya
- Country of origin: Japan
- Original language: Japanese
- No. of seasons: 1
- No. of episodes: 8

Production
- Executive producer: Makiko Okano
- Producers: Jun Kurosawa; Teppei Chikami
- Production location: Hokkaido
- Running time: 45-54 minutes
- Production company: Telepack

Original release
- Network: Netflix
- Release: November 14, 2024

Beyond Goodbye (Japanese: さよならのつづき, Hepburn: Sayonara no Tsuzuki) is a Netflix original Japanese drama series starring Kasumi Arimura and Kentaro Sakaguchi. All eight episodes were released on Netflix on November 14, 2024. This is the first television series written by screenwriter Yoshikazu Okada and his second collaboration with Sakaguchi after the film The Last 10 Years in 2022.

== Synopsis ==
Saeko Sugawara works at a coffee manufacturing company in Hokkaido. Through coffee, she was able to meet her boyfriend Yusuke, who co-owned a coffee shop with his best friend. Her love story tragically ended when Yuusuke died in a traffic accident while protecting Saeko. This is a story that begins from a "goodbye" as Saeko lives her life coping about the loss of Yuusuke when she encounters Kazumasa, who sometimes acts eerily similar to Yuusuke. Unknowingly to her, Kazumasa was the one who received Yuusuke's heart transplant.

== Cast ==
- Kasumi Arimura as Saeko Sugawara

A coffee lover who moves from Tokyo to work at a coffee manufacturing company in Hokkaido. She hopes to bring people happiness through coffee.

- Kentaro Sakaguchi as Kazumasa Naruse

A university staff who was born with a weak body before receiving heart transplant from Yuusuke.

- Toma Ikuta as Yuusuke Nakamichi

The free-spirited boyfriend of Saeko who died in a traffic accident.

- Yuri Nakamura as Miki Naruse

Kazumasa's wife who married him despite his health condition. Her family owns an apple farm.

- Eita Okuno as Kengo Inoue

Yuusuke's best friend who runs a coffee shop.

- Tomokazu Miura as Hiro

Saeko's business partner who owns a coffee field in Hawaii.

== Production ==
The series mainly takes place in Otaru, Hokkaido. This is the first television series written by screenwriter Yoshikazu Okada and his second collaboration with actor Kentaro Sakaguchi after the 2022 film The Last 10 Years.

== Episodes ==
No. in series	Title	Directed by	Written by	Original release date
1	"Beyond a Proposal"	Hiroshi Kurosaki	Yoshikazu Okada	November 14, 2024
Yusuke has prepared a lavish proposal for his fiancée Saeko in the snow-capped mountains of Hokkaido, but their journey takes an unexpected turn.
2	"Beyond Life"	Hiroshi Kurosaki	Yoshikazu Okada	November 14, 2024
Naruse has unexpected new habits and a fresh lease on life after a successful heart transplant. Later, a fatal meeting results from a delayed train.
3	"Beyond Memories"	Hiroshi Kurosaki	Yoshikazu Okada	November 14, 2024
Saeko can't help but see Yusuke in Naruse, especially when his remarks strangely match her late fiancé’s. Naruse experiences a horrific memory.
4	"Beyond a Birthday"	Hiroshi Kurosaki	Yoshikazu Okada	November 14, 2024
Saeko encounters Naruse at work even though she makes a conscious effort to keep her distance from him. They had a heartwarming moment together after an unexpected hurricane.
5	"Beyond the Storm"	Hiroshi Kurosaki	Yoshikazu Okada	November 14, 2024
Naruse strives to find out more about Yusuke as a person while Saeko and Naruse confront the possibility of who the heart donor was.
6	"Beyond Fate and Chance"	Hiroshi Kurosaki	Yoshikazu Okada	November 14, 2024
On a rainy day before to the accident, Saeko and Yusuke had a brief contact with Naruse. Saeko and Naruse take a day trip down memory lane in the present.
7	"Beyond a Lifetime"	Hiroshi Kurosaki	Yoshikazu Okada	November 14, 2024
Naruse's doctor gives him an unexpected diagnosis. In the meantime, Saeko finds the courage to confront him head-on and engages him in frank discussion.
8	"Beyond Goodbye"	Hiroshi Kurosaki	Yoshikazu Okada	November 14, 2024
Saeko adjusts to her quiet existence on the coffee farm in Hawaii, while Naruse confronts his own life and makes a crucial choice.
