= Signal (South Korean TV series) =

2016 South Korean TV series

- Promotional poster
- Hangul: 시그널
- RR: Sigeuneol
- MR: Sigŭnŏl
- Genre: Crime; Police Procedural; Serial drama; Sci-Fi; Thriller; Mystery
- Created by: Choi Jin-hee; Park Ji-young
- Written by: Kim Eun-hee
- Directed by: Kim Won-seok
- Starring: Lee Je-hoon; Kim Hye-soo; Cho Jin-woong
- Music by: Kim Joon-seok; Park Sung-il; (season 1); Hwang Sang-jun (season 2)
- Opening theme: "I Will Forget You" by Jung Cha-sik
- Ending theme: Various songs
- Country of origin: South Korea
- Original language: Korean
- No. of seasons: 1
- No. of episodes: 16 (list of episodes)

Production
- Executive producers: Lee Chan-ho; Lee Sang-baek
- Producers: Lee Jae-moon; Park Eun-kyung
- Cinematography: Choi Sang-mook; Lee Joo-young
- Editor: Kim Na-young
- Camera setup: Single camera
- Running time: 64–80 minutes
- Production companies: AStory (season 1); B.A. Entertainment (season 2); Baram Pictures (season 2); Studio Dragon (season 2)

Original release
- Network: tvN; AXN
- Release: January 22, 2016 – present

Related
- Signal (2018); Gyaarah Gyaarah (2024)

Signal (Korean: 시그널) is a South Korean television series written by Kim Eun-hee, directed by Kim Won-seok, and starring Lee Je-hoon, Kim Hye-soo, and Cho Jin-woong. It was inspired by real-life criminal incidents in Korea, including the Hwaseong serial murders. The first season aired on tvN from January 22 to March 12, 2016, every Friday and Saturday at 20:30 (KST). In March 2024, a second season was confirmed to be in production.

The series received widespread acclaim from audiences and critics alike for its story and performances. It is also one of the highest-rated Korean dramas in cable television history with a peak audience viewership of 12.544% - only next to Reply 1988 (18.803%) at the time of its release in 2016.

== Plot ==
In present-day 2015, criminal profiler Park Hae-young (Lee Je-hoon) finds a mysterious discarded walkie talkie; inexplicably, the person at the other end, Detective Jae-han (Cho Jin-woong), is from the past, and addresses him familiarly, even though Hae-young has never met him. Hae-young is able to solve a 15-year-old kidnapping and murder case involving a former classmate from his childhood with Jae-han's help. The success of this case triggers the formation of a cold case team, led by Detective Cha Soo-hyun (Kim Hye-soo), who has been searching for Jae-han, her long-lost mentor and unrequited love, for the past 15 years.

With Jae-han's help from the 1990s, Hae-young solves other cold cases that have remained unsolved for years and is drawn into the mystery surrounding Jae-han's disappearance in the year 2000. As they try to fix the past and catch the criminals, unintended consequences follow in the present.

== Cast ==
=== Main ===
- Lee Je-hoon as Park Hae-young

The jaded and hotheaded criminal profiler who finds the walkie-talkie by chance, and uses his connection with Jae-han to solve cold cases.

- Kim Hye-soo as Cha Soo-hyun

The first female police officer in the Special Task Force, she becomes the leader of the Seoul cold case squad. She has been searching for Jae-han, her mentor and unrequited love, for 15 years, believing him to be dead.

- Cho Jin-woong as Lee Jae-han

The socially inept but virtuous and quick-tempered detective from the past who establishes a rapport with Park through the walkie-talkie. His timeline during his communication with Park spans from 1989 to 2000.

=== Supporting ===
Police officers

- Jang Hyun-sung as Kim Bum-joo

The corrupt police superintendent.

- Jung Hae-kyun as Ahn Chi-soo

The section chief and supervisor of the Seoul cold case squad who acts as Bum-joo's lackey but appears morally gray.

- Kim Won-hae as Kim Gye-chul

A police officer who joins the Seoul cold case squad and often serves as comic relief.

- Jung Han-bi as Oh Yoon-seo

A colonel.

- Lee Yoo-joon as Jung Han-ki

A forensic scientist and member of the Seoul cold case squad, often seen with Detective Kim.

- Kim Min-kyu as Hwang Eui-kyung

A junior officer that cleans up the Seoul cold case squad's work area and admires them.

Extended

- Kim Hyun-bin as young Park Hae-young
- Kang Chan-hee as Park Sun-woo

Hae-young's older brother who was convicted in the high school gang rape case and died by suicide after being released.

- Yang Dae-hyuk as Hong Won-seo

A detective.

- Lee Moon-soo as Lee Jae-han's father
- Seo Ju-hee as Cha Soo-hyun's mother
- Lim Hwa-young as Cha Soo-hyun's younger sister
- Lee Do-yeop as Kim Jung-jae

=== Special appearances ===
- Oh Yeon-ah as Yoon Soo-ah (ep. 1–2)
- Lee Young-eun as Kim Yoon-jung (ep. 1–2)
- Lee Si-a as Kim Won-kyung (ep. 2–4)
- Kim Jung-young as Won-kyung's aunt (ep. 2–4)
- Kim Ki-cheon as Lee Chun-goo (ep. 3–4)
- Lee Dong-ha as Han Se-kyu (ep. 5–8)
- Jung Suk-yong as Oh Kyung-tae (ep. 5–7)
- Park Si-eun as Oh Eun-ji (ep. 5–6)
- Choi Woo-ri as Shin Yeo-jin (ep. 5–6)
- Yoo Ha-bok as Shin Dong-hoon (ep. 5–7)
- Son Hyun-joo as Jang Young-chul (ep. 7, 11, 14, 16)
- Lee Eun-woo as Shin Da-hye (ep. 7–8)
- Lee Sang-yeob as Kim Jin-woo (ep. 9–11)
- Lee Chae-kyung as Jin-woo's mother (ep. 10)
- Seo Eun-ah as Yoo Seung-yeon (ep. 10–11)
- Shin Yi-joon as Kang Hye-seung (young / ep. 11–14)
- Kim Woo-suk as Lee Dong-jin (ep. 12–14)
- Lee Jin-kwon as a bully (ep. 12)
- Hwang Seung-eon as Han Do-yeon (ep. 13)
- Jeon Su-ji as Kang Hye-seung (adult / ep. 13–14)
- Seo Ji-hoon as Jang Tae-jin (ep. 14)

== Episodes ==
No.	Title	Directed by	Written by	Original release date
1	"You're Doomed"	Kim Won-seok	Kim Eun-hee	January 22, 2016
In 2000, 10 year old Park Hae-young is the only person to see his classmate Yoon-jung leaving school with a woman, unaware that she is being kidnapped. The suspect is male medical student Hyung-joon; though Hae-young knows the culprit was a woman, no one listens to him. Yoon-jung is murdered and Hyung-joon is never found, leaving Hae-young disillusioned with the police. 15 years later, he has become a jaded but intelligent criminal profiler. A few days before the statute of limitations on Yoon-jung's unsolved case has passed, he finds an old police walkie-talkie from a bag of discarded evidence and intercepts a live communication from Detective Lee Jae-han in the year 2000. Jae-han has just discovered Hyung-joon's corpse and addresses Hae-young with familiarity, even though the two have never met. With his clues, Hae-young finds the remains of Hyung-joon in the present. Supported by lead detective Cha Soo-hyun, the team detains the culprit, only to realize minutes before the statute expires, that she has been framed by the real culprit, Nurse Yoon Soo-ah.
2	"We Still Have a Chance"	Kim Won-seok	Kim Eun-hee	January 23, 2016
Yoon-jung's statute expires but before she can walk free, the team convicts her for Hyung-joon's murder instead. Amid public pressure from the injustice of Yoon-jung's case, the statute for cold cases is lifted, allowing criminals to be apprehended no matter how much time passes, and corrupt police superintendent Kim Bum-joo begrudgingly institutes a new cold case squad in Seoul, overseen by Chief Ahn Chi-soo and Soo-hyun. The team includes the members involved in solving Yoon-jung's case, with Hae-young as their criminal profiler. Their first case is the South Gyeonggi Nambu serial murders, the most famous cold case in Korea. Hae-young receives another walkie-talkie transmission from Jae-han in 2000, now wounded on a mountain. Jae-han warns him that he will have to convince him of something in 1989 as "they will start again", before a gunshot is heard. He is mystified when the next transmission is from the younger 1989 version of Jae-han, then a rookie helping in the Gyeonggi Nambu case. Confused, he lets slip a detail that allows Jae-han to stop the 8th murder from happening. As a result, in 2015, all records of the Gyeonggi Nambu murders change.
3	"We Can Prevent the Killings"	Kim Won-seok	Kim Eun-hee	January 29, 2016
Hae-young realizes that everyone else's memories have changed to accommodate the new reality, with the 8th victim, Lee Mi-sun, now a survivor. He alone remembers the original reality and realizes that he and Jae-han can change the past and future together. However, he quickly learns that their actions also have consequences when Kyung-soon, a coworker of Mi-sun, becomes a new victim in the present; she had not been alive in the original reality and the murderer has struck again after all these years. In 1989, Jae-han arrests the wrong man; due to this, he is suspended from the police force. In 1989 and 2015, Hae-young and Jae-han both figure that the killer was forced to board the late-night bus to escape Jae-han but bus driver Lee Chun-goo claims no one had boarded. When Hae-young reveals that the 9th victim is office worker Kim Won-kyung, whom Jae-han has feelings for, Jae-han realizes he has less than an hour left to save her.
4	"We Found the Killer"	Kim Won-seok	Kim Eun-hee	January 30, 2016
In 2015, evidence confirms Kyung-soon's murderer was bus driver Lee Chun-goo and the original South Gyeonggi Nambu killer was Chun-goo's son, Lee Jin-hyung, whom Chun-goo protected for decades. Jin-hyung is currently paralyzed and hospitalized. In 1989, Jin-hyung kills Won-kyung, leaving Jae-han devastated. In 2015, Chun-goo killed Kyung-soon after the statute of limitations was lifted because she had evidence with which she blackmailed them for years. The evidence is the taser Jae-han had given Won-kyung for protection, which contains Jin-hyung's DNA. These findings are presented to the press as the first solved case of the Seoul cold case squad. Jae-han's fight with Jin-hyung in 1989 had resulted in his paralysis. In a flashback from 2000, a young Hae-young discovers his older brother, Park Sun-woo, has killed himself after his release from being convicted in the Injoo high school gang rape case of 1999. Hae-young tells Jae-han that the South Gyeonggi case will remain unsolved in 1989 because the technology to prove it was Jin-hyung will not exist until the present.
5	"Changing the Past Alters the Present"	Kim Won-seok	Kim Eun-hee	February 5, 2016
In 1995, then-rookie Soo-hyun becomes the first woman to join the Special Task Force, Jae-han and the other detectives being her seniors. Jae-han suspects ex-convict Oh Kyung-tae for a string of recent burglaries but he insists he is innocent. In 2015, Hae-young learns that Jae-han was declared missing in 2001 but fathoms that his case was fabricated and he was likely murdered instead. Bum-joo warns Chi-soo that the truth about Jae-han must never be discovered. During their next transmission, Hae-young is shocked to learn that it is now 1995 for Jae-han; even though only one week has passed for Hae-young, six years have passed for him. Hae-young fears changing the past again but when Jae-han is desperate, he decides giving a few clues is harmless, as the case remains unsolved in 2015. However, these clues lead Jae-han to mistakenly arrest Kyung-tae, resulting in the death of Kyung-tae's daughter Eun-ji, who had been alive in the original reality. The next day, Hae-young finds that reality has changed again: Kyung-tae has now been imprisoned for the burglaries for 20 years. He has just been released three days ago, whereupon he immediately kidnaps a woman named Shin Yeo-jin.
6	"Catch Him By All Means"	Kim Won-seok	Kim Eun-hee	February 6, 2016
In 1995, Jae-han arrests Kyung-tae, causing his daughter Eun-ji to take the bus home. The bridge collapses and the rescue crew can only save Eun-ji or a younger Shin Yeo-jin before the bus explodes. Yeo-jin's father, Dong-hoon, forces them to save Yeo-jin, leaving Eun-ji to die. In 2015, Kyung-tae, blaming Dong-hoon for his daughter's death, leads Dong-hoon to a truck that he has rigged to explode. Soo-hyun dies in the detonation, leaving Hae-young and her team devastated. In 1995 and 2015, Jae-han and Hae-young both discover that the real perpetrator is Han Se-kyu, the son of one of the burglary victims and the 1995 eyewitness, who lied and framed Kyung-tae. In 2015, he is now a wealthy lawyer with a politically-connected father and no evidence, making it difficult for Hae-young to capture him. Jae-han resolves to catch him in his timeline instead.
7	"We Must Dig Deeper"	Kim Won-seok	Kim Eun-hee	February 12, 2016
In 1995, Jae-han, wanting justice for Kyung-tae's false conviction, uncovers the items Se-kyu stole; thus, Se-kyu is arrested and Kyung-tae is exonerated in 1995 rather than 2015. However, Kyung-tae still goes after Dong-hoon, this time murdering him. He dies in prison, while Se-kyu himself is quickly released. In 2015, reality changes once more: Soo-hyun is alive, since the 2015 events with Kyung-tae and the truck never happened in this reality. Relieved, Hae-young resolves to stop changing the past, and disposes of the walkie-talkie. Chi-soo follows and retrieves it, discovering that it's the walkie talkie that belonged to Jae-han. In 1995, Jae-han's superior is replaced with the corrupt Kim Bum-joo. Investigating further, he discovers that a woman, Shin Da-hye, stole a diamond necklace from Se-kyu and has since killed herself. At the same time in 2015, Da-hye's past fiancée asks the cold case squad to investigate Da-hye, insisting he saw her alive just days ago. The squad indeed finds evidence that Da-hye never died in 1995.
8	"How Are You Alive?"	Kim Won-seok	Kim Eun-hee	February 13, 2016
The cold case squad investigates the 20-year disappearance of Shin Da-hye. Back then, Se-kyu had raped her and the sex tape made by his friends was used to blackmail him so he'd stolen into each of their wealthy homes to find the tape, making it look like burglaries; then framed Kyung-tae. Da-hye has been hiding in Germany and only returned to Korea for her ill mother. After she stole the necklace, Se-kyu had broken in and murdered who he believed was her; he'd actually killed her best friend. When he covered it up by making it look like suicide, Da-hye took on the identity of her deceased friend and went into hiding to stay safe. Her family has an audio recording of the murder that night. This, and Da-hye's statement, is used to prove Se-kyu the murderer. It is revealed that in 2000, it was Ahn Chi-soo who shot and killed Jae-han right after he sent his last transmission. In 2015, Hae-young is bewildered to find the walkie-talkie in Chi-soo's desk before he is confronted by Chi-soo himself.
9	"Hongwon Dong Case"	Kim Won-seok	Kim Eun-hee	February 19, 2016
In the present, Chi-soo reveals that the walkie-talkie had belonged to Jae-han. When Hae-young takes it back, Chi-soo doesn't stop him. Hae-young discovers Jae-han's notebook in Soo-hyun's house; in a note, Jae-han had listed four cases. The first two are the ones the pair had solved together. The next two are the Hongwon-dong case of 1997, in which two women were brutally murdered, and the Inju high school gang rape case of 1999. Hae-young is shaken to discover that Jae-han had worked on the case his older brother Sun-woo was involved in. During their next conversation, it is 1997 for Jae-han; he has not heard from Hae-young for two years. In the present, the squad's next cold case ends up being the Hongwon-dong incident when a third victim is found on a mountain near Hongwon-dong. Soo-hyun reveals that in 1997, she herself had been targeted by the murderer. Bound and suffocating with a plastic bag over her head, she was able to escape, though she suffers PTSD. She believed the killer stopped after that, since no more incidents occurred. However, in 2015, as the squad combs the mountain, they are horrified to discover eight more bodies, realizing the serial killer is still active today.
10	"Someone Has to Stop the Bad Guys"	Kim Won-seok	Kim Eun-hee	February 20, 2016
In total, the Hongwon-dong killer, a convenience store worker named Kim Jin-woo, is responsible for 11 murders. The detective squads in 1997 and 2015 attempt to find Jin-woo's house; both fail. During their transmission, Jae-han is happy to hear about Soo-hyun in the future but Hae-young does not have the heart to tell him that he is presumed dead. Jin-woo was abused by his mother as a child, which influenced his becoming a murderer. The last victim, killed in 2014, is Yoo Seung-yeon, who had a crush on Jin-woo; this caused her death by his hand. Through Seung-yeon's journal, Hae-young deduces that all the victims had frequented the same convenience store and finds the one Jin-woo works at. Meanwhile, Soo-hyun goes through Hongwon-dong, retracing for the first time her steps from the night of her harrowing escape in 1997. This way, she finds Jin-woo's home.
11	"The One Last Case"	Kim Won-seok	Kim Eun-hee	February 26, 2016
In 2015, the squad captures Jin-woo. With the case still ongoing in 1997, Jae-han demands to know who it is, but Hae-young refuses to tell him to avoid the consequences that come with changing the past. However, Jin-woo vanishes from custody in 2015: history has changed. Jae-han had continued investigating and arrested Jin-woo in 1998 all on his own, thus preventing the nine additional murders that had occurred since 2001; each of those victims are now alive and well. Hae-young decides that there is still hope in what he and Jae-han are doing. The next time the walkie-talkie is active, it is 1999 for Jae-han, with the last case in his note: the Inju high school gang rape case. Hae-young pleads with Jae-han to tell him the truth about what really happened. In 1999, 9-year old Hae-young is living in Inju with his mother and older brother Sun-woo. At Sun-woo's high school, student Kang Hye-seung accuses 18 male students of gang rape. In Inju, Jae-han meets local detective Ahn Chi-soo for the first time. In 2015, Chi-soo, having had a change of heart about his cold case squad, resigns after his cancer-ridden daughter dies. He warns Hae-young that he will be in danger like Sun-woo if he continues investigating the Inju case, and that the case was entirely fabricated. Chi-soo promises to reveal the truth at Inju Hospital but upon arriving, Hae-young finds Chi-soo fatally wounded.
12	"The Case Was Manipulated"	Kim Won-seok	Kim Eun-hee	February 27, 2016
In 2015, Chi-soo confesses that he killed Jae-han in 2001 and has since regretted it, and that "it all started in Inju" before he dies. Hae-young becomes the prime suspect in his death. In 1999, Jae-han suspects the seven members of the Inju high school student council. Bum-joo works to protect them, as they all come from powerful backgrounds. When student Lee Dong-jin mentions that Sun-woo used to tutor Hye-seung, Bum-joo decides to let Sun-woo, who comes from no money or connections, be the scapegoat. Thus, the students all come prepared with fabricated statements blaming him for the rape. Jae-han is helpless when he learns that the police themselves bribed the detectives and witnesses to cooperate with Sun-woo's framing. After the police arrest Sun-woo, Hae-young's parents divorce and his father takes him to Seoul. Hae-young then found Sun-woo dead from suicide after being released from juvie. A teenage Hae-young learns that a local bully was instructed to give fabricated testimony by the police to frame him, which instilled in Hae-young a deep-seated hatred of law enforcement. In the present, Hae-young remembers that he saw the car of gangster Kim Sung-bum outside of Inju Hospital. He and Soo-hyun investigate a desolate house listed under Sung-bum's mother that may have been used to store evidence. Recalling what Chi-soo said about "checking" before he died, Hae-young digs in front of the house and is horrified to discover the skeletal remains of Lee Jae-han.
13	"The Real Assailant"	Kim Won-seok	Kim Eun-hee	March 4, 2016
In 2001, Jae-han goes missing. Realizing he must be dead, Soo-hyun resolves to visiting the forensics center each time they receive skeletal remains to see if it is Jae-han. In 1999, Jae-han realizes that the 2015 Park Hae-young is in fact Sun-woo's younger brother. Tracking down 9-year old Hae-young in Seoul, he discovers him starving and neglected by his father. He begins to watch over him from a distance, paying off a local restaurateur to feed the child daily. As a teenager, Hae-young remembers being told that Sun-woo was framed due to being poor and weak, so he resolves to become strong and educated. He joins the police academy, as it is the only high-end educational institution willing to overlook his grades. In 2015, Jae-han's father holds a funeral for him, which only Hae-young and Soo-hyun attend. At Jae-han's house, Hae-young discovers the truth about Jae-han being his secret benefactor. Wanting the detective to be safe, he tries to convince him to give up on the Inju case to prevent his death, but Jae-han promises that he will see it through. In 2015, the cold case squad secretly re-investigates the 1999 Inju case, starting by finding the victim, Hye-seung. The adult Hye-seung explains that she was forced by the police and her father to blame Sun-woo.
14	"Not Now, But Maybe in the Past"	Kim Won-seok	Kim Eun-hee	March 5, 2016
In 2015, Hye-seung reveals that the real perpetrator is Jang Tae-jin, nephew of Senator Jang Young-chul, an influential congressman. Hae-young insists that she give her statement to prove his brother's innocence but as the lift on the statute of limitations does not include rape and Hye-seung is unwilling to testify, Tae-jin cannot be convicted. Distressed, Hae-young turns to his next option: changing the past. Jae-han is now in 2000 and with the Inju case closed, shifts his focus to Bum-joo; he reports him to Internal Affairs, resulting in an investigation on Bum-joo. Sun-woo is released from incarceration after six months and immediately goes about trying to clear his name, retrieving Hye-seung's red scarf from Lee Dong-jin as evidence. Sun-woo calls Jae-han, requesting to meet so he can give him the scarf. Instead of going immediately, Jae-han accompanies the team on a burglary bust out of concern for Soo-hyun. He is stabbed, causing a distraught Soo-hyun to confess her feelings. In 2015, Hae-young retraces Chi-soo's steps at Inju Hospital, where Sun-woo had died. In shock, he discovers from Sun-woo's old blood report that he had been sedated when he died, meaning he was murdered. Hae-young desperately begs Jae-han to save Sun-woo. In 2000, an injured Jae-han realizes Sun-woo dies today and races to save him.
15	"Is It Really You?"	Kim Won-seok	Kim Eun-hee	March 11, 2016
In 2000, Bum-joo arrives at Sun-woo's house before Jae-han, having received a tip from the Inju police. Because he is protecting Tae-jin in exchange for Tae-jin's congressman uncle Jang Young-chul stopping the internal investigation on his corruption, he murders Sun-woo. Defeated and ashamed, Jae-han transfers to a different precinct. In 2015, Hae-young is arrested for Chi-soo's murder, due to false evidence placed by Bum-joo, just as in Sun-woo's situation. He entrusts the walkie-talkie to Soo-hyun. During the next transmission, Jae-han brokenly apologizes to Hae-young for his failure, but is met with the older 2015 Soo-hyun. She attempts to prevent his murder by giving him the date and location of his death. Kim Sung-bum is on the run due to Bum-joo trying to make him the scapegoat for Jae-han's murder now that his remains have been found. Sung-bum requests to meet Hae-young; Soo-hyun helps Hae-young escape from custody to do so. Sung-bum reveals the truth of Jae-han's death: in 2000, Jae-han had obtained forensic analysis implicating Bum-joo in Sun-woo's death. During the Kim Yoon-jung kidnapping case, Bum-joo discovers the evidence and has Jae-han captured by Sung-bum and Chi-soo. Jae-han made his final transmission to Hae-young before Chi-soo killed him. In the present, Hae-young is distraught to learn that Jae-han died because of him. Sung-bum is killed by a hitman sent by Bum-joo; Hae-young blocks Soo-hyun from a bullet and is shot.
16	"If You Don't Give Up"	Kim Won-seok	Kim Eun-hee	March 12, 2016
In 2015, Hae-young dies from the gunshot. In 2000, Jae-han delivers the very first radio transmission that Hae-young had received in the first episode before he is knocked out by Chi-soo. It is revealed that after Bum-joo had murdered Sun-woo, he'd discarded the scarf at a rest stop. Jae-han managed to find the scarf at the nearby landfill. Knowing that the police in Korea cannot be trusted, he sent it to the United States for forensic analysis; the results provided him with key evidence not only about the Inju rape case perpetrator but Bum-joo's involvement in Sun-woo's death. Right before Chi-soo fires the bullet that originally killed Jae-han, other officers appear - this time, because of 2015 Soo-hyun's transmission warning him of his death, Jae-han had called for backup. Bum-joo escapes while Chi-soo is arrested. Due to Jae-han surviving and finally changing the past, Hae-young suddenly wakes up in 2015 alive. In this reality, Sun-woo had been posthumously exonerated so his parents never divorced. The cold case squad never existed and do not recognize him. Hae-young rushes to meet Jae-han only to learn that he again went missing and is presumed dead. Jae-han had tracked down Bum-joo for the floppy disk stolen by Han Se-kyu that implicates Jang Young-chul in a corruption scheme. Jae-han and Bum-joo had been attacked. Bum-joo's corpse was found, but Jae-han escaped. Hae-young retrieves Jae-han's notebook and finds his parents' address written inside. In 2000, Jae-han had mailed the floppy disk to Hae-young's parents, believing it would be safe there, along with a letter to the future adult Hae-young, explaining that the transmissions have stopped since Jae-han prevented his own death. Hae-young travels to the coastal city the envelope was mailed from and chances upon Soo-hyun, who remembers the original reality. A few days ago, she received a strange text warning her to stay away from a nursing home in the area. They theorize that Jae-han might indirectly be signaling them to go. Holding hope, the pair drives to the nursing home, where it is revealed that Jae-han is still alive and is about to answer the active walkie-talkie thus confirming the latter's future theory to be true.

== Original soundtrack ==
Signal OST

Soundtrack album by Various Artists
- Released: March 15, 2016
- Genres: Pop, K-pop, soundtrack
- Producers: CJ E&M

Disc 1:
No.	Title	Artist	Length
1.	"회상" (Reminisce)	Jang Beom-june (Busker Busker)	4:27
2.	"떠나야할 그사람" (The One Who Will Leave)	INKII	4:06
3.	"나는 너를" (I Will Forget You)	Jung Cha-sik	4:24
4.	"길" (The Road)	Kim Yoon-ah	4:27
5.	"행복한 사람" (Happy Person)	Jo Dong-hee	3:34
6.	"꽃잎" (A Petal)	Leesa	3:16
7.	"꽃이 피면" (As Flower Blooms)	Lee Seung-yeol	3:38

Disc 2:
No.	Title	Artist	Length
1.	"Detective Lee Jae-han" (형사 이재한)	Various Artists
2.	"For Those Who Left Behind" (남겨진 이들을 위해)	Various Artists
3.	"Young Park Hae Young" (소년 박해영)	Various Artists
4.	"Conclusive Evidence" (결정적 증거)	Various Artists
5.	"Heartfelt Desire" (절실한 염원)	Various Artists
6.	"Send The Signal Desperately" (간절함이 보내온 신호)	Various Artists
7.	"New Clue" (새로운 단서)	Various Artists
8.	"Past Can Be Changed" (과거는 바뀔 수 있습니다)	Various Artists
9.	"Jae Han's Reason" (재한의 추리)	Various Artists
10.	"Pain That Can't Be Heal" (치유되지 않는 아픔)	Various Artists
11.	"Footsteps of Nostalgia" (그리움의 발자취)	Various Artists
12.	"Profiling" (프로파일링)	Various Artists
13.	"형기대의 하루"	Various Artists
14.	"Tracking" (추적)	Various Artists
15.	"Don't Give Up" (포기하지마)	Various Artists
16.	"Crime Scene" (범행현장)	Various Artists
17.	"A Series of Labyrinthine" (미궁의 연속)	Various Artists
18.	"Real Culprit" (진범)	Various Artists
19.	"Run Too, Today" (오늘도 달린다)	Various Artists
20.	"Only I Didn't Know" (혼자만 모른다)	Various Artists
21.	"Long-term Unsolved Case" (장기미제사건)	Various Artists
22.	"The Truth Revealed" (드러나는 진실)	Various Artists
23.	"Cool Air" (서늘한 공기)	Various Artists
24.	"Plot" (음모)	Various Artists
25.	"Suggestion" (암시)	Various Artists

== Reception ==
Upon its premiere, the series attracted attention for weaving actual cases into its plot and attained high ratings. With its finale rating of 12.54%, it is one of the highest rated Korean dramas in cable television history. It received praise for its solid acting, tightly constructed plot and detailed and sophisticated direction; and enjoyed success internationally in China and Japan.

The drama went on to win several awards from different award-giving bodies, including Best Drama, Best Screenplay for Kim Eun-hee, and Best Actress for Kim Hye-soo at the 52nd Baeksang Arts Awards, as well as another Best Actress award for Kim and the Daesang (Grand Prize for Television) for Cho Jin-woong at the tvN10 Awards. Cho also won the Daesang at the 1st Asia Artist Awards for his performance.

== Ratings ==
Ep.	Original broadcast date	Title	Average audience share		
Ep.	Original broadcast date	Title	AGB Nielsen		TNmS
Ep.	Original broadcast date	Title	Nationwide	Seoul	Nationwide
1	January 22, 2016	You're Doomed	5.415%	5.960%	6.4%
2	January 23, 2016	We Still Have a Chance	6.926%	7.343%	6.1%
3	January 29, 2016	We Can Prevent the Killings	8.239%	8.910%	18.5%
4	January 30, 2016	We Found the Killer	7.666%	8.601%	7.5%
5	February 5, 2016	Changing the Past Alters the Present	7.789%	7.568%	7.6%
6	February 6, 2016	Catch Him By All Means	7.077%	6.710%	7.3%
7	February 12, 2016	We Must Dig Deeper	8.612%	8.454%	9.0%
8	February 13, 2016	How Are You Alive?	7.784%	7.913%	8.6%
9	February 19, 2016	Hongwon Dong Case	7.803%	7.672%	8.4%
10	February 20, 2016	Someone Has to Stop the Bad Guys	9.195%	8.945%	8.7%
11	February 26, 2016	The One Last Case	10.456%	11.915%	8.8%
12	February 27, 2016	The Case Was Manipulated	10.065%	10.865%	9.2%
13	March 4, 2016	The Real Assailant	9.667%	8.918%	9.7%
14	March 5, 2016	Not Now, But Maybe in the Past	11.120%	12.155%	10.6%
15	March 11, 2016	Is It Really You?	10.772%	12.145%	9.8%
16	March 12, 2016	If You Don't Give Up	12.544%	13.541%	12.8%
Average			8.821%	9.226%	8.7%
In this table, the blue numbers represent the lowest ratings and the red numbers represent the highest ratings.; This drama airs on a cable channel/pay TV which normally has a relatively smaller audience compared to free-to-air TV/public broadcasters (KBS, SBS, MBC and EBS).

== Awards and nominations ==
Year	Award	Category	Recipient	Result	Ref.
2016	52nd Baeksang Arts Awards	Best Drama	Signal	Won	
2016	52nd Baeksang Arts Awards	Best Director	Kim Won-seok	Nominated	
2016	52nd Baeksang Arts Awards	Best Actor	Cho Jin-woong	Nominated	
2016	52nd Baeksang Arts Awards	Best Actress	Kim Hye-soo	Won	
2016	52nd Baeksang Arts Awards	Best Screenplay	Kim Eun-hee	Won	
2016	5th APAN Star Awards	Best Screenwriter	Kim Eun-hee	Won	
2016	5th APAN Star Awards	Top Excellence Award, Actor in a Miniseries	Cho Jin-woong	Won	
2016	5th APAN Star Awards	Top Excellence Award, Actress in a Miniseries	Kim Hye-soo	Nominated	
2016	9th Korea Drama Awards	Best Drama	Signal	Nominated	
2016	9th Korea Drama Awards	Best Production Director	Kim Won-seok	Nominated	
2016	9th Korea Drama Awards	Best Screenplay	Kim Eun-hee	Nominated	
2016	tvN10 Awards	Grand Prize (Daesang), Actor	Cho Jin-woong	Won	
2016	tvN10 Awards	Best Actor	Cho Jin-woong	Nominated	
2016	tvN10 Awards	Best Actor	Lee Je-hoon	Nominated	
2016	tvN10 Awards	Best Actress	Kim Hye-soo	Won	
2016	tvN10 Awards	PD's Choice Award	Lee Je-hoon	Won	
2016	tvN10 Awards	Scene Stealer Actor	Jang Hyun-sung	Nominated	
2016	tvN10 Awards	Best Content Award, Drama	Signal	Won	
2016	1st Asia Artist Awards	Grand Prize (Daesang)	Cho Jin-woong	Won	
2016	1st Asia Artist Awards	Grand Prize (Daesang)	Kim Hye-soo	Nominated	
2016	1st Asia Artist Awards	Best Celebrity Award, Actor	Lee Je-hoon	Nominated	
2016	18th Mnet Asian Music Awards	Best OST	Jang Beom-jun	Nominated	
2016	Korea Content Awards	Presidential Commendation Award	Kim Eun-hee	Won	
2017	Brand of the Year Awards	Drama Writer of the Year	Kim Eun-hee	Won	

== Adaptations ==
- A Japanese remake of the series starring Kentaro Sakaguchi was aired from April 10 to June 12, 2018, on Fuji TV.
- On October 23, 2019, Unknown Number, a Chinese remake of the series, started airing on Tencent Video.
- On April 2, 2021, a Japanese film of same name was released based on the Japanese television series adaptation of the Korean original - it continued from where the television series had left off.
- On January 20, 2023, a Thai remake of the series titled 23:23, was aired on True4U.
- On April 24, 2024, an Indian remake of the series titled Gyaarah Gyaarah, has premiered on August 9, 2024, on Zee5.

== See also ==
- Hwaseong serial murders
- Miryang gang rape
