= The 100th Love with You =

2017 film by Shō Tsukikawa

- Theatrical release poster

Japanese name
- Kanji: 君と100回目の恋
Transcriptions
- Revised Hepburn: Kimi to 100 Kaime no Koi
- Directed by: Sho Tsukikawa
- Written by: Satomi Oshima
- Produced by: Yoko Ide
- Starring: Miwa; Kentaro Sakaguchi
- Cinematography: Mitsuru Komiyama
- Edited by: Hiroaki Morishita
- Music by: Goro Ito
- Production companies: Tristone Entertainment; Sony Music Entertainment Japan; Kyodo Tokyo; Line Corporation; Shueisha
- Distributed by: Asmik Ace
- Release date: February 4, 2017 (Japan)
- Running time: 116 minutes
- Country: Japan
- Language: Japanese

The 100th Love with You (Japanese: 君と100回目の恋, Hepburn: Kimi to 100 Kaime no Koi) is a Japanese romantic fantasy film starring Miwa and Kentaro Sakaguchi, with original screenplay by Satomi Oshima and direction by Sho Tsukikawa. It premiered in Japan on February 4, 2017, and was also released in other territories including China and South Korea.

External videos
- The 100th Love with You Trailer

== Plot ==
The film begins with a young Aoi Hinata sitting on a bench, upset about the broken record in her hands. A young Riku suddenly appears and claims he can fix the record. Immediately it's the present day and university student Aoi Hinata (Miwa) drops the book she's holding and jerks awake, disrupting the class. This is the summer before Aoi's study abroad to London. Apart from school, Aoi plays in a band with her friends, Naoya, Tetta and her childhood friend Riku (Kentaro Sakaguchi). Rina isn't in the band, but attends practices. Aoi and Riku appear to harbor some affection towards each other. Practice goes smoothly after that and Riku quickly announces that he has other things to do, to the confusion and bewilderment of his band members. The crew marvels if he's a perfect man and ask Aoi if Riku has any weaknesses. She can't think of a single one.

In preparation for their concert on Sunday, July 31, the crew put up flyers and paint signs. As Aoi and Rina paint, Aoi is dismayed by Riku's distantness, but maintains that she's content with staying friends with Riku throughout the summer. Riku nonchalantly pulls away the board they're painting, remarking it'll be dirty. Seconds later, a burst pipe showers water on all of the friends. Everyone except Riku are completely soaked. Once the band's all packed and ready, Naoya pulls Riku aside and tells him he plans to confess to Aoi at the shrines. While the crew is having sushi, Naoya's plan to confess to Aoi goes awry when he can't seem to invite her to the shrines, leading him to blurt out his confession in front of the crew. Aoi feels awkward because she has feelings for Riku and doesn't know what to say. Later on, she visits Riku's house to work on their song. While waiting for him, she explores his room and stumbles upon a record and record player in his closet. Riku appears suddenly and tells her not to touch the record, placing the record back carefully and hiding it from view, saying that some things shouldn't be seen. The pair work on their new song and become awkward with their feelings when comparing hands. Out of nowhere, Riku tells Aoi that if he ever disappear somewhere, she should be happy with Naoya. Aoi hurriedly gathers the pieces of their new song and tells him to forget it. The day of the concert arrives and Aoi still feels conflicted from yesterday's events. Unable to concentrate, the band performs terribly. Further upset by the concert, Aoi storms off. Crying and walking, she pulls out her handkerchief to wipe her tears, but lets a piece of the song lyrics fall out. As she chases the piece of paper into the street, she doesn't notice the truck hurdling towards her. The screen turns black.

Aoi wakes up in the same class as before, complete confused and disorientated. The day repeats like before, with brand practice and Riku one step ahead of everyone else. Aoi bursts out in frustration and tells her friends to stop pretending, to their confusion. Now knowing that Rina likes Naoya, Aoi fiercely affirms her friendship with Rina to the point of tears. Rina accepts her passion with confusion. When the same pipe bursts, Aoi darts over to Riku, who looks at her in shock and asks her why she moved. When she tells him that it's because the same thing happened a week ago, he laughs at her. Aoi thinks Riku is mocking her and storms off. Later on, the two sit in front of a sunset, where Riku reveals that he knows how Aoi died that day. He reveals his secret: he's been cheating with his record player of life, which gives him the ability to go back in time. Aoi doesn't believe him at first. He says he didn't either before guiding Aoi's hand to the needle and places it down on a groove and she wakes up once again in the same classroom as before, this time aware of the time rewind.

Aoi runs out of class to look for Riku, who tells her he told her so. She asks him what he means by cheating and he asks her if she remembers the first time he played guitar for her. On that day, it had been young Aoi's birthday. She had broken her late father's record and went to Riku's uncle's shop to ask if he could fix. When he says it's not possible, she leaves visibly deflated. Riku, eavesdropping the whole time, takes matters into his own hands and turns back time one day. From then on, he asks his uncle to teach guitar, turning back time until he's able to play the song on the record for Aoi. After serenading her, he tells her not to cry and that he'll celebrate her birthday until she's 100. Another time, he time travels so that he has a month to prepare a chocolate record for Aoi with the song "Happy Birthday" on it. Aoi tells him that she always wondered why he was so calm and collected, but now understands why. Riku quietly remarks that it's because he wanted to look cool in front of her. Aoi asks if Riku likes her, but he avoids the question. Aoi hops on top of a bridge with Riku on the ground beside her. She reminds him that he had told her to be with Naoya and he jokes, asking if she was sure it wasn't a dream. After a moment of silence, Riku admits he's always liked Aoi from the moment they met. Aoi remarks that it's a waste they both confessed so late, seeing as she's studying abroad so soon. Riku helps Aoi down from the bridge and as the two hold each other, he asks if she wants to start over. The two run off and a montage begins of their relationship. The couple two go public with their newfound love in front of their friends at the annual summer festival, making fun new memories together as a couple.

The montage ends right around the holidays as Aoi is admiring the snow. Riku comes up behind her and surprises her with a necklace to celebrate their relationship. The happy couple embrace. Time fast forwards and Aoi is still on track to study abroad after summer. The day before the concert rolls around and Riku is visibly unsettled and concerned, while Aoi assumes he's upset about her leaving for London. At a concert, Aoi and Riku renew their commitment to each other and Aoi exclaims that they'll always be together. The day of the concert arrives and the band's performance is a smashing success. As the team banter, Riku quickly realizes that Aoi is gone. He frantically searches for her, until he sees the ambulance and her dead body. The screen cuts to black.

Aoi is sitting in class again, this time paying attention. Riku bursts in mid-lecture and hugs Aoi. Later, Riku skips band practice and is seen frantically asking a professor for help. Later that night, while the two are writing the new song, Aoi doesn't recognizes some of the lyrics and realizes that Riku has time skipped. She's hurt that Riku time traveled without her. After consistently skipping practice, Riku gets into a fight with the rest of the band members and walks away. Aoi is suspicious and pokes around his room. She goes to the professor she saw him talk to earlier and learns that he's been asking questions about time. When she opens his notebook, she realizes that he's relived the day of her death many, many times. Traumatized, Aoi takes a quiet walk back. Riku sits down with his uncle and reveals that no matter what he's done, he could never save Aoi. But, out of everything he's tried, only one thing seemed to change their fates: when he traded his life for hers. Aoi overhears their conversation and realizes the reason she could remember the one time she died was because Riku had sacrificed his life for hers. Riku's uncle remarks that on that day, Riku had died when he shouldn't have, which is why is time turned back. Rather than changing fate, Riku had simply dragged Aoi into the mess with him. Upset, Riku asks how he was so sure. His uncle replies that it's because he did exact same thing. Aoi can't focus the next day and runs out to the sea. Riku finds her and gently reminds her that they should finish their song.

As the two tiptoe around the issue, Aoi finally tells Riku that he can stop pretending now. She confronts him and asks how many times he's seen her die. Riku promises that she won't die and remarks that they have the ability to go back wherever they want, however many times they want. As Riku is about to time travel, Aoi remembers their vibrant summer together and takes the record of life and snaps it in half. Riku sees Aoi's decision as her giving up; Aoi doesn't want to see Riku suffer through her death over and over again. Even as Aoi emphasizes how she enjoyed their year together, Riku is resolute on fixing the record. While Aoi takes time to fully accept that her final day is approaching, Riku's uncle pauses by his door to tell his story: his wife had been diagnosed with cancer and had felt that her husband had been distant lately, fully unaware that he was time traveling. Riku's uncle reminds Riku that he cannot fix broken record and that time in the present is much more important. Moved, Riku apologizes to Naoya and Tetta for lashing out at them and begs them to learn Aoi's new song. He goes with Rina to beg the fireworks man for his help. Finally, he runs over to find Aoi. Aoi stands on top of a hill and muses her anxieties out loud. Riku draws her close and reassures that he will be there for her always and that he wants to spend his time living life with Aoi. With newfound determination, the couple run back to the festival and make it just in time. The band performs Aoi's new song and Riku finally sings a part of it. When the song ends, the fireworks that Aoi had mused about a long time ago go off and she admires how pretty they are. Tears brimming in her eyes, Aoi thanks Riku, saying that out of her 100 birthdays, this was the best one. The scene fades to black.

Facing the ocean, the crew, dress in all-black, stand along the edge, an empty space indicating that Aoi has died. When Riku returns to the record shop, his uncle plays Aoi's last message to Riku on a record player. Aoi's voice jolts Riku to attention. She comforts Riku and encourages him to be strong and move forward, to live a vibrant life. She exclaims that this is his 100th birthday present and plays her last song to him, thanking him for loving her and for their precious memories. At the sound of her voice, Riku bursts in tears and breaks down. As Aoi's song continues to play in the background, Riku begins to move on with his life. He reorganizes his room, goes to class with his friends, jokes around with them, runs the record shop, and plays in the band with his friends. Sitting on the bench, he remembers his good times with Aoi and leaves with a smile. The camera lingers on the empty bench facing the ocean and fades to black.

== Cast ==
=== Main ===
- Miwa as Aoi Hinata
- Kentaro Sakaguchi as Riku Hasegawa

=== Supporting ===
- Ryo Ryusei as Naoya Matsuda
- Erina Mano as Rina Sagara
- Yuki Izumisawa as Tetta Nakamura
- Rina Ohta as Kaoru Obara, a graduate student of physics
- Keiko Horiuchi as Keiko Hinata, Aoi's mother
- Goro Oishsi as a professor
- Seiichi Tanabe as Shuntaro Hasegawa, Riku's uncle and foster parent.

== Original soundtrack ==
The film's soundtrack was on Oricon Albums Chart for six weeks and peaked at #25.

The 100th Love with You (君と100回目の恋, Kimi to 100 Kaime no Koi) Original Soundtrack

Soundtrack album by Various Artists
- Released: January 25, 2017
- Genres: Soundtrack, Ballad, Pop
- Label: Sony Music Japan
- Producer: Naoki Yoshitake

=== Selected tracks ===
- "The 100th Love with You" (君と100回目の恋, "Kimi to Hyakkaime no Koi") by Miwa
- "Aiokuri" (アイオクリ) by The STROBOSCORP
- "Simple Feelings" (単純な感情, "Tanjun na Kanjo") by The STROBOSCORP
- "Birthday Morning" by Andōzu
- "BGM" by Androp
- "27" by Super Beaver

== Home media ==
The film's Blu-ray (Limited Edition) BD+BD (SRXW-2/3), Blu-ray (SRXW-4), DVD (Limited Edition) DVD + DVD (SRBW-41/42), DVD (SRBW-43) was released on June 23, 2017 by Asmik Ace

== Reception ==
=== Box office ===
The film premiered in 190 screens, and opened at #5 in the box office with 73,352 admissions. The film had earned ¥95 million (US$0.851 million).

=== Reception ===
It ranked #1 in PIA Corporation's audience satisfaction survey.

== Adaptation ==
=== Manga ===
A three-volume manga adaptation (ISBN 978-4-08-890577-8, ISBN 978-4-08-890578-5, ISBN 978-4-08-890596-9) by Yoshiduki Kumichi "Kimi was released on Young Jump Comics, Shueisha

=== Novel ===
Two novelizations, by Orange Bunko (ISBN 978-4-08-680114-0) and Mirai Bunko (ISBN 978-4-08-680114-0) were released

=== Remake ===
In July 2017, Linekong Pictures Corporation acquired the rights of the film for a Chinese-language adaptation.

== Spin-off ==
Written by Satomi Oshima the one-volume Kimi to Ikkaime no Koi (君と1回目の恋, The 1st Love with You), ISBN 978-4-08-745564-9, was released as spin-off of the film
