= Kim Eun-hee =

South Korean playwright and screenwriter (born 1972)

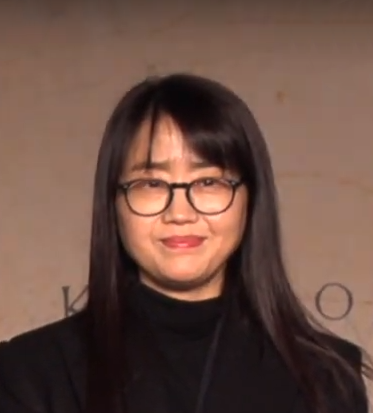
- Kim Eun-hee in 2019
- Born: January 7, 1972 (age 54); Cheongun-dong, Jongno District, Seoul, South Korea
- Education: Department of Literature Seoul Institute of the Arts
- Occupations: Screenwriter, Playwright
- Years active: 2010 to present
- Agent: Media Lab Seeso
- Spouse: Jang Hang-jun (m. 1998)
- Children: Jang Yeon-soo (daughter)

Korean name
- Hangul: 김은희
- Hanja: 金銀姬
- RR: Gim Eunhui
- MR: Kim Ŭnhŭi

Kim Eun-hee (Korean: 김은희; born January 7, 1972) is a South Korean screenwriter. She is known internationally for the tvN series Signal (2016) and the Netflix series Kingdom (2019–2021).

== Career ==
In the early 1990s, Kim began her career as a writer at the SBS entertainment department, working as an assistant writer. During that time, she crossed paths with Jang Hang-jun, who was also working as an entertainment writer. They eventually got married in 1998. Prior to their marriage, Jang transitioned from being an entertainment writer to focusing on writing movie scenarios. In 1996, he achieved recognition in the film industry with the script for The Case of Park Bong-gon's Runaway from Home, which marked the beginning of his career as a screenwriter and director. As Kim assisted Jang in translating his written scripts into words, her interest in movies grew.

She debut as film scriptwriter in film Once in a Summer that was released in 2006.

In 2010, She debuted in television with tvN drama Golden House, co-writing with Jang Hang-jun, director Jang directed until the 10th episode, and writer Kim participated in the script and co-wrote 11th episode.

In 2011, she delved into the genre more seriously by writing the SBS drama Sign. Sign was recognized for its fresh approach in unearthing the truth behind a murder case by incorporating the unfamiliar subject of forensic science. It also gained attention due to the outstanding performance of Park Shin-yang, considered a virtuoso actor. Each episode of Sign received favorable reviews, culminating in a record-breaking 24.9% viewer rating for the final episode.

Building on this success, writer Kim Eun-hee gained prominence by consistently delivering suspenseful genres. Phantom (2012), an SBS drama starring So Ji-sub that explores cybercrime and murder cases, and Three Days (2014), another SBS drama starring Son Hyun-joo that revolves around the kidnapping and assassination of the president, introduced genres rarely seen in mini-series and garnered a dedicated fan base. It was said that the appearance of Kim Eun-hee marked a significant turning point in the landscape of Korean dramas.

On March 5, 2017, Kim was announced as the creator and screenwriter for the Netflix political period horror thriller series Kingdom. The series debuted on January 25, 2019, to critical acclaim. The series was renewed for a second season which was released on March 13, 2020. A special feature-length episode of the series, titled Kingdom: Ashin of the North, was announced in November 2020. It was released on July 23, 2021, and focused on the supporting character Ashin played by Jun Ji-hyun.

On June 15, 2023, the agency Media Lab Seeso reported the news of an exclusive contract with Kim Eun-hee, who is called the 'Master of Genre'.

== Philanthropy ==
On March 4, 2022, Kim donated 30 million won to the Children's Fund in Ukraine, along with her husband, Jang Hang-jun, to help Ukrainian victims in Russian invasion.

== Personal life ==
Kim is married to director Jang Hang-jun since 1998. They met when Kim was an assistant writer at SBS Entertainment Bureau. They have a daughter named Jang Yeon-soo.

== Writings ==
=== Film ===
Year	Title	Credited as		Ref.
Year	Title	Writer	Creator	Ref.
2006	Once in a Summer	Yes	No	
2021	Signal the Movie	Co-writer	Yes	
2023	Rebound	Co-writer	No	

=== Television series ===
Year	Title	Network	Credited as		Ref.
Year	Title	Network	Writer	Creator	Ref.
2010	Golden House	tvN	Co-writer	No	
2011	Sign	SBS	Co-writer	No	
2012	Phantom	SBS	Yes	No	
2014	Three Days	SBS	Yes	No	
2016	Signal	tvN	Yes	No	
2021	Jirisan	tvN	Yes	No	
2019–2020	Kingdom	Netflix	Yes	Yes	
2021	Kingdom: Ashin of the North	Netflix	Yes	Yes	
2023	Revenant	SBS	Yes	No	

=== Webcomic ===
Year	Title	Credited as			Ref.
Year	Title	Writer	Creator	Webtoon Artist	Ref.
2020–present	The Kingdom of the Gods	Yes	Yes	Yang Kyung-il	

== Accolades ==
=== Awards and nominations ===
Year	Award	Category	Nominated work	Result	Ref.
2016	Baeksang Arts Awards	Best Screenplay	Signal	Won	
2016	APAN Star Awards	Best Writer	Signal	Won	
2016	Korea Drama Awards	Best Screenplay	Signal	Nominated	
2020	Asia Contents Awards	Best Writer	Kingdom	Won	
2020	15th A-Awards: The Best Black Collar Workers of 2020 (Note: Hosted by Arena Homme Plus)	Drama	Kim Eun-hee	Won	
2020	CJ ENM Visionary	2020 Visionary	Kim Eun-hee	Won	
2024	Baeksang Arts Awards	Best Screenplay	Revenant	Nominated	

=== State honor ===
Name of country, year given, and name of honor
Country	Award Ceremony	Year	Honor	Ref.
South Korea	Korea Content Awards (Note: Honors are given at the Korean Content Awards (대한민국 콘텐츠 대상) arranged by the Korea Creative Content Agency and hosted by the Ministry of Culture, Sports and Tourism. The 2022 Korea Content Awards Ceremony, which started in 2009 and celebrated its 14th this year, aims to inspire pride in the content industry and develop the Korean cultural content industry by discovering and awarding contributors and excellent content that have contributed to the development of the content industry in 2022. It is a place to promote. The winners (works) of honor, which are recommended through the website of the Korea Creative Content Agency (www.kocca.kr) and announced through careful examination by experts and three-step verification, play a leading role in shining the Korean content industry in the world.)	2016	Presidential Commendation	
South Korea	Korean Popular Culture and Arts Awards (Note: Honors are given at the Korean Popular Culture and Arts Awards, arranged by the Korea Creative Content Agency and hosted by the Ministry of Culture, Sports and Tourism. They are awarded to those who have contributed to the arts and South Korea's pop culture.)	2020	Presidential Commendation	

=== Listicles ===
Name of publisher, year listed, name of listicle, and placement
Publisher	Year	Listicle	Placement	Ref.
Sisa Journal	2015	Next Generation Leader—Culture and Arts	1st	
Sisa Journal	2023	Next Generation Leader—Culture and Arts	10th	
