= Kentaro Sakaguchi =

Japanese actor (born 1991)

- 坂口健太郎
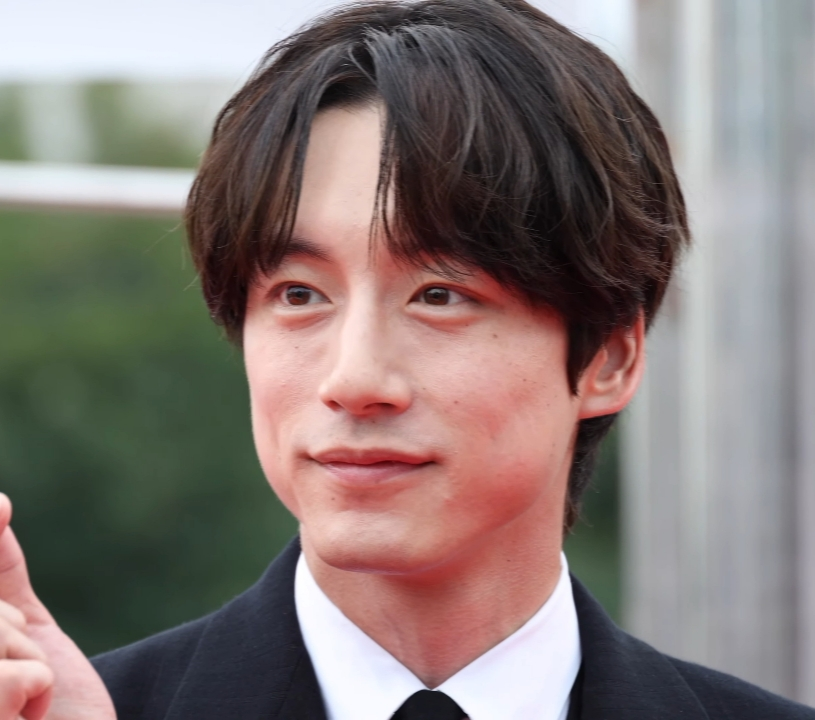
- Sakaguchi at the 2025 Seoul Drama Awards
- Born: July 11, 1991 (age 35); Tokyo, Japan
- Occupations: Actor; model
- Years active: 2010–present
- Agent: Tristone
- Height: 183 cm (6 ft 0 in)
- Spouse: Unknown (m. 2026)
- Website: tristone.co.jp/actors/sakaguchi/

Kentaro Sakaguchi (Japanese: 坂口 健太郎, Hepburn: Sakaguchi Kentarō; born July 11, 1991) is a Japanese actor and model. He debuted as a model in Men's Non-no magazine in 2010, and as an actor under Tristone Entertainment in 2014. He first gained recognition for starring in the television series Signal (2018) and its 2021 film Signal the Movie. Sakaguchi attained further prominence for the films The Last 10 Years (2022) and Side by Side (2023), as well as dramas What Comes After Love (2024) and Beyond Goodbye (2024).

== Personal life ==
Sakaguchi was born on July 11, 1991 in Tokyo, Japan. His family consists of his mother and sister. He stated in an interview that the death of his father caused him to be closer to his mother.

=== Marriage ===
On September 6, 2026, Sakaguchi announced his marriage to his long-term girlfriend.

== Career ==
=== Modeling ===
Sakaguchi debuted as a model in 2010, and has since appeared in cover stories and pictorials for several magazines including Men's Non-no for which he was an exclusive model for 7 years. He has also participated in fashion shows like GirlsAward 2014 Spring/Summer and GirlsAward 2015 Spring/Summer.

He has been called the quintessential "shio-gao," literally salt-face, which is described as a fair-skinned male with a good-looking face, defined Adam's apple and collarbones, as well as eyes that turn into lines when smiling.

=== Acting ===
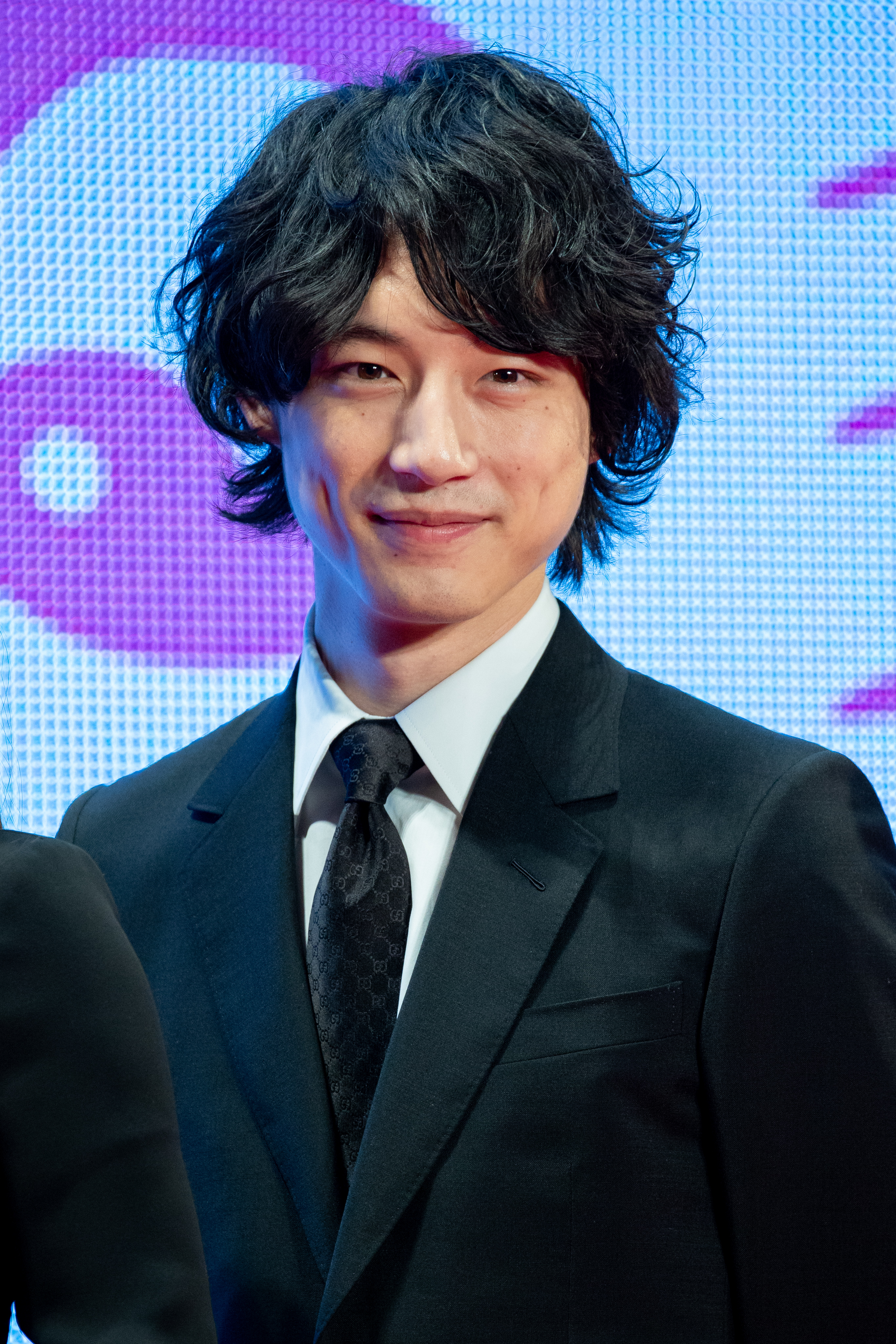
Sakaguchi at the Tokyo International Film Festival in 2018

In 2014, Sakaguchi made his film debut as Shun in Shanti Days 365 Days, Happy Breath. In 2015, he made his television debut as Ichikawa Manabu for the Nippon TV drama Yokokuhan: The Pain. In August 2015, he appeared in the music video for "Yozora", a single by Miwa. In September that year, he gained popularity after appearing in the film adaptation of the manga No Longer Heroine and was featured in a variety of advertisements for L'air de Savon, Onitsuka Tiger, and niko and.... In 2017, he played his first leading role in the film The 100th Love with You.

== Filmography ==
=== Film ===
Year	Title	Role	Notes	Ref.
2015	My Love Story!	Makoto Sunakawa		
2017	The 100th Love With You	Riku Hasegawa	Lead role	
2018	Color Me True	Kenji	Lead role	
2018	The House Where the Mermaid Sleeps	Yūya Hoshino		
2019	Brave Father Online: Our Story of Final Fantasy XIV	Akio	Lead role	
2019	Dragon Quest: Your Story	Henry (voice)		
2019	And Life Goes On	Kiyotaka Shimizu	Lead role	
2020	Masked Ward	Hayami	Lead role	
2021	Signal the Movie	Kento Saegusa	Lead role	
2022	The Last 10 Years	Kazuto	Lead role	
2022	Hell Dogs	Hideki Murooka		
2023	Side by Side	Miyama	Lead role	
2024	The Parades	Akira		
2025	The Final Piece	Keisuke Kamijo	Lead role	
2026	I Don't Know You	Yuhei Nishiyama	Lead role; French-Japanese film	

=== Television ===
Year	Title	Role	Notes	Ref.
2015–17	Dr. Storks	Ryo Shirakawa	2 seasons	
2016	Daddy Sister	Takezo Hoshino	Asadora	
2018	Signal	Kento Saegusa	Lead role	
2019	Innocence, Fight Against False Charges	Taku Kurokawa	Lead role	
2019	And Life Goes On	Kiyotaka Shimizu	Lead role	
2020	A Girl of 35	Yuto Hirose		
2021	Air Girl	Yūki Mishima	TV movie	
2021	Welcome Home, Monet	Kōtarō Suganami	Asadora	
2021	Only Just Married	Shu Momose		
2022	Hiru	Kara	Lead role	
2022	The 13 Lords of the Shogun	Hōjō Yasutoki	Taiga drama	
2023	Dr. Chocolate	Tetsuya Noda	Lead role	
2023	Code Japan: Price of Wishes	Minato Ninomiya	Lead role	
2024	What Comes After Love	Jungo	Lead role; South Korean television series	
2024	Beyond Goodbye	Naruse	Lead role	
2026	Kidnap Game	Niide Toshiro	Lead role	

=== Music video appearances ===
Year	Song	Artist	Notes	Ref.
2015	"夜空." feat. ハジ→ (Yozora. feat. Haji)	Miwa		
2017	"アイオクリ" (Aiokuri)	The Stroboscorp	The 100th Love with You OST	
2022	"Ms. Phenomenal"	Radwimps	The Last 10 Years OST	
2022	"Under the Skin"	&Team		
2025	"Dream"	Lisa	Short film. Won the best Pop Song award at the 2026 MTV Video Music Awards	

== Theater ==
Year	Title	Role	Venue	Notes	Ref.
2016	The Seagull	Konstantin Gavrilovich Treplyov	Tokyo Art Theater		

== Bibliography ==
=== Mook ===
- Sakamichi (Shueisha Mook, November 2015) ISBN 9784081022045

=== Photobook ===
- 25.6 (Shueisha, March 2018) ISBN 9784087808339

== Awards and nominations ==
Year	Award	Category	Work	Result	Ref.
2016	11th Osaka Cinema Festival	Best New Actor	My Love Story! & No Longer Heroine	Won	
2017	41st Elan d'or Awards	Newcomer of the Year	—N/a	Won	
2017	40th Japan Academy Film Prize	Newcomer of the Year	64: Part I & 64: Part II	Won	
2017	Elle Cinema Award 2017	Elle Men Award	—N/a	Won	
2021	Seoul International Drama Awards	Asian Star Prize	—N/a	Won	
2022	47th Hochi Film Awards	Best Supporting Actor	Hell Dogs	Nominated	
2023	77th Mainichi Film Awards	Best Supporting Actor	Hell Dogs	Nominated	
2023	46th Japan Academy Film Prize	Best Supporting Actor	Hell Dogs	Nominated	
2023	8th Asia Artist Awards	Best Artist Award (Actor)	—N/a	Won	
2023	8th Asia Artist Awards	Asia Celebrity Award	—N/a	Won	
2023	8th Asia Artist Awards	Male Actor Popularity Award	—N/a	Nominated	
2025	Asia Star Entertainer Awards 2025	Fan Choice Couple	Kentaro Sakaguchi (with Lee Se-young); What Comes After Love	Won	
