= Persona 3 The Movie: =

Persona 3 The Movie: # may refer to:

- Persona 3 The Movie: No. 1, Spring of Birth, 2013
- Persona 3 The Movie: No. 2, Midsummer Knight's Dream, 2014
- Persona 3 The Movie: No. 3, Falling Down, 2015
- Persona 3 The Movie: No. 4, Winter of Rebirth, 2016
