= Persona 3 The Movie =

Film series based on the video game Persona 3

- First film logo

劇場版「ペルソナ3」 (Gekijō Ban Perusona 3)
- Anime film series
- Directed by: Noriaki Akitaya (#1); Tomohisa Taguchi (#2 and #4); Keitaro Motonaga (#3)
- Produced by: Kazunori Adachi
- Written by: Jun Kumagai
- Music by: Shoji Meguro; Tetsuya Kobayashi
- Studio: AIC ASTA (1); A-1 Pictures (2-4)
- Licensed by: Aniplex of America
- Released: November 23, 2013 – January 23, 2016
- Films: 4

Persona 3 The Movie (劇場版「ペルソナ3」, Gekijō Ban Perusona 3; stylized as "P3 PERSONA3 THE MOVIE") is a Japanese animated film series based on the Persona 3 video game by Atlus. There are four films in the series, subtitled #1 Spring of Birth (2013), #2 Midsummer Knight's Dream (2014), #3 Falling Down (2015), and #4 Winter of Rebirth (2016).

== Plotline ==
The Persona 3 film series is a four-part adaptation of the Persona 3 storyline. Unlike the game's route-based structure, the films condense and reinterpret events around game's storyline

1. #1 Spring of Birth adapts roughly April through June of the game. It closely follows the opening months of Persona 3, including Makoto's arrival at Gekkoukan High School, the formation of SEES, the introduction of Tartarus and the Dark Hour, and the awakening of several party members' Personas. The movie focuses heavily on Makoto's emotional detachment and gradual involvement with the group. Major events adapted include the Magician, Priestess, and Emperor/Empress Full Moon operations.
2. #2 Midsummer Knight's Dream adapts approximately June through early October. It covers the Yakushima trip, the beach vacation, Mitsuru's family revelations, and several Full Moon battles including the Hermit and Lovers Shadows. Compared to the game, the movie streamlines many school-life sections and places greater focus on Junpei and Chidori's relationship.
3. #3 Falling Down adapts roughly October through December. It centers on the collapse of SEES' morale following multiple tragedies. The film adapts following Shinjiro Aragaki's death, Ken's revenge plot, the revelation of Ryoji's true identity as Nyx Avatar, and the emotional fallout suffered by the team.
4. #4 Winter of Rebirth adapts December through the game's ending in March. The movie focuses on the final choice presented by Ryoji, SEES' decision to oppose Nyx, and Makoto's acceptance of mortality and human connection. It adapts the final ascent of Tartarus, the battle against Nyx Avatar, and the bittersweet graduation ending.

== Voice cast ==
Character	Film			
Character	#1 Spring of Birth	#2 Midsummer Knight's Dream	#3 Falling Down	#4 Winter of Rebirth
Makoto Yuki	Akira Ishida	Akira Ishida	Akira Ishida	Akira Ishida
Yukari Takeba	Megumi Toyoguchi	Megumi Toyoguchi	Megumi Toyoguchi	Megumi Toyoguchi
Junpei Iori	Kōsuke Toriumi	Kōsuke Toriumi	Kōsuke Toriumi	Kōsuke Toriumi
Mitsuru Kirijo	Rie Tanaka	Rie Tanaka	Rie Tanaka	Rie Tanaka
Akihiko Sanada	Hikaru Midorikawa	Hikaru Midorikawa	Hikaru Midorikawa	Hikaru Midorikawa
Fuuka Yamagishi	Mamiko Noto	Mamiko Noto	Mamiko Noto	Mamiko Noto
Shinjiro Aragaki	Kazuya Nakai	Kazuya Nakai	Kazuya Nakai	Kazuya Nakai
Aigis	—	Maaya Sakamoto	Maaya Sakamoto	Maaya Sakamoto
Ken Amada	—	Megumi Ogata	Megumi Ogata	Megumi Ogata
Igor	Isamu Tanonaka	Isamu Tanonaka	Isamu Tanonaka	Isamu Tanonaka
Elizabeth	Miyuki Sawashiro	Miyuki Sawashiro	Miyuki Sawashiro	Miyuki Sawashiro
Takaya Sakaki	—	Nobutoshi Canna	Nobutoshi Canna	Nobutoshi Canna
Jin Shirato	—	Masaya Onosaka	Masaya Onosaka	Masaya Onosaka
Chidori Yoshino	—	Miyuki Sawashiro	Miyuki Sawashiro	Miyuki Sawashiro
Ryoji Mochizuki	—	—	Akira Ishida	Akira Ishida
Shuji Ikutsuki	Hideyuki Hori	Hideyuki Hori	Hideyuki Hori	—
Isako Toriumi	Yuka Komatsu	Yuka Komatsu	Yuka Komatsu	Yuka Komatsu
Natsuki Moriyama	Atsumi Tanezaki	Atsumi Tanezaki	Atsumi Tanezaki	Atsumi Tanezaki
Hidetoshi Odagiri	Hiroaki Miura	—	Hiroaki Miura	Hiroaki Miura
Kenji Tomochika	Kenji Nojima	—	Hiroaki Miura	Hiroaki Miura
Pharos	Akira Ishida	Akira Ishida	Akira Ishida	Akira Ishida
Takeharu Kirijo	—	Yasunori Masutani	Yasunori Masutani	—

== Reception ==
Persona 3 The Movie: #1 Spring of Birth made a gross earning of US$1,956,267 and was ranked at 118 in Japan at the end of 2013 by Box Office Mojo.
