= Persona 3 The Movie: No. 2, Midsummer Knight's Dream =

2014 animated film

Persona 3 The Movie: #2 Midsummer Knight's Dream
- Theatrical release poster. Right caption reads, "I exist to protect you."
- Directed by: Tomohisa Taguchi
- Written by: Jun Kumagai
- Story by: Atlus
- Based on: Persona 3 by Atlus
- Starring: Akira Ishida; Megumi Toyoguchi; Kōsuke Toriumi; Rie Tanaka; Hikaru Midorikawa; Mamiko Noto; Maaya Sakamoto; Megumi Ogata; Kazuya Nakai; Isamu Tanonaka; Miyuki Sawashiro
- Edited by: Takashi Sakurai
- Music by: Tetsuya Kobayashi
- Production company: A-1 Pictures
- Distributed by: Aniplex
- Release date: June 7, 2014 (Japan)
- Running time: 98 minutes
- Country: Japan
- Language: Japanese
- Box office: ¥152,752,386; (US$1,418,708)

Persona 3 The Movie: #2 Midsummer Knight's Dream (劇場版「ペルソナ3」第2章, Gekijōban Perusona 3 Dai Ni Shō) is a 2014 Japanese animated film and the second installment in a film series based on the Persona 3 video game by Atlus. The film is directed by Tomohisa Taguchi and written by Jun Kumagai. It is based on the original story by Atlus and distributed by Aniplex. The plot follows Makoto Yuki (played by Akira Ishida) as he arrives in Iwatodai City, where he finds himself using a mysterious power called Persona to lead the SEES group into battles against entities known as Shadows. As they begin to unravel the mysteries of what's known as the Dark Hour, Makoto and his new friends face many foes and challenges while the pieces of a much greater threat start falling into place. A sequel, titled Persona 3 The Movie: #3 Falling Down, was released on April 4, 2015.

== Plot ==
The movie starts with SEES' battle in a full moon phase on July. Junpei Iori, Akihiko Sanada, and Mitsuru Kirijo are fighting the Shadow Arcana Hierophant with Fuuka Yamagishi providing tactical support for them. Meanwhile Makoto Yuki and Yukari Takeba are captured by the Shadow Arcana Lovers and under its spell but eventually free themselves from it. Defeating the Hierophant, Junpei, Akihiko, and Mitsuru regroup with Makoto and Yukari, and they defeat the Arcana Lovers. Unbeknownst to them, they are observed by three mysterious people. Makoto and the others goes to Yakushima for a break and they spend most of the day playing at the beach. While trying to flirt with women under Junpei's insistence, Makoto encounters a mysterious blonde haired girl. At night, Mitsuru's father, Takeharu Kirijo, gathers everyone and reveals that the Dark Hour and the Shadows were created by an accident caused by Mitsuru's grandfather Kouetsu Kirijo and Yukari's father Eiichiro Takeba in an attempt to create a device that could manipulate time. He shows a video left by Yukari's father, who reveals that SEES can end the Dark Hour by destroying the twelve Arcana Shadows. This revelation shocks Yukari, who feels responsible for her father's sin, but Makoto comforts her. Entering the Dark Hour, Makoto and Yukari are attacked by Shadows and are almost killed until the blonde haired girl from earlier, revealed to be a Persona user, saves them. Shuji Ikutsuki introduces the girl as Aigis, a 7th Generation Anti-Shadow Suppression Weapon developed by the Kirijo Group, and she joins SEES.

Back at the dorm, Mitsuru orders Makoto to pick up Ken Amada, an elementary school student who has the potential to become a Persona user. Moving to the dorm, Ken decides to take a walk, unaware that the Dark Hour has begun. At a nearby shrine, Koromaru, the dog of the deceased shrine owner, is attacked by a Shadow. Makoto arrives and saves Ken before he is devoured by the Shadows. Another Shadow appears, that Ken notices bears resemblance with the one that killed his mother, and he concludes that the Shadows are the ones responsible for his mother's death. Ken swears to annihilate all Shadows and awakens his Persona ability. He and Koromaru, who also has the potential to become a Persona user, join SEES. Entering the full moon phase, SEES prepares to fight another Shadow Arcana. They are approached by Takaya Sakaki and Jin Shirato, who introduce themselves as Strega and reveal that they have come to stop them from eliminating the Dark Hour. They trap them and ask if they truly want the Dark Hour to end. The combined Arcana Chariot and Justice appear and attack. Aigis momentarily gains the advantage by using her Orgia Mode, but quickly overheats, and the rest of the group is weakened by poison gas left by Takaya. Shinjiro Aragaki rescues them by destroying the gate to the area, allowing the poison to disperse, and Makoto destroys the two Shadow Arcanas.

At the end of their summer vacation, SEES goes to a summer festival, where Ken bonds with Shinjiro. Entering a new semester, Aigis transfers to Makoto's class. Makoto, Aigis, Yukari, Junpei, and Fuuka share their thoughts about what they will do after the Dark Hour ends. Makoto starts to become afraid that he will lose the meaning of his life if the Dark Hour disappears. This causes Makoto to become hesitant in fighting the Arcana Hermit, frustrating Shinjiro, who loses control of his Persona. Ken recognizes Shinjiro's berserk Persona as the one that killed his mother, realizing that Shinjiro is responsible for his mother's death. On October 4, Ken and Shinjiro are not present for the mission against the Arcana Fortune and Strength. Remembering that October 4 is the date of Ken's mother's death, Akihiko and Mitsuru reveal that two years ago before leaving SEES, Shinjiro's Persona went out of control and accidentally killed Ken's mother. Akihiko attempts to reach Ken and Shinjiro and defuse the situation, but is stopped by the Arcana Fortune and Strength.

While Makoto and the others are fighting against the Shadow Arcanas, Ken declares that he will kill Shinjiro, but they are interrupted by Takaya, who reveals the Persona Suppressants that Shinjiro has been taking have been slowly killing him, making Ken's revenge pointless. With Akihiko's help, Makoto eventually defeats the two Shadow Arcanas and hurries to where Ken and Shinjiro is. Ken, losing his will to live, lets Takaya shoot him, but Shinjiro sacrifices himself and takes the bullet instead. By the time Makoto and the others arrive, Shinjiro's wounds are already too severe and he orders Ken to keep on living before dying. On October 7, Shinjiro's funeral is held at Gekkoukan High, and only Akihiko is absent throughout the funeral.

After the ending credits, Ryoji Mochizuki is seen standing at the Moonlight Bridge.

== Cast ==
=== Main ===
- Akira Ishida as:

- Makoto Yuki:
An orphaned teenager who moves to Iwatodai City and finds himself suddenly thrown into a war against supernatural monsters called Shadows. He is made the de facto leader of the Specialized Extracurricular Execution Squad (SEES) and uses his unique ability of summoning multiple Personas to help his newly acquired friends explore a mysterious tower full of Shadows called Tartarus as well as defeat the powerful Shadows who began appearing on the nights of a full moon. His main Persona is Orpheus.

- Pharos:
A mysterious boy who occasionally appears to Makoto and warns him of impending trials and dangers.

- Megumi Toyoguchi as Yukari Takeba:

A Gekkoukan High School sophomore and member of the Specialized Extracurricular Execution Squad. Yukari faces her own personal struggles despite putting on a brave face in front of her peers. She suspects that Mitsuru and the Kirijo Group are somehow linked to her father's death. Her Persona is Io.

- Kōsuke Toriumi as Junpei Iori:

Junpei is the most relaxed member of the Specialized Extracurricular Execution Squad and often prioritizes how he spends his free time ahead of his academics. He finds a curious acquaintance in a strange girl named Chidori after finding himself envious of Makoto's achievements. His Persona is Hermes.

- Rie Tanaka as Mitsuru Kirijo:

The founder of the Specialized Extracurricular Execution Squad and student council president at Gekkoukan High School. She is also the daughter of the head of the Kirijo Group multinational corporation which sponsors Gekkoukan High School. Her Persona is Penthesilea.

- Hikaru Midorikawa as Akihiko Sanada:

Akihiko is a long time friend of Mitsuru and Shinjiro and part of the boxing team at Gekkoukan High School. He is sometimes scolded by Mitsuru for pushing himself to his limits as a fighter and Persona user. His Persona is Polydeuces.

- Mamiko Noto as Fuuka Yamagishi:

Fuuka is a sophomore at Gekkoukan High School who was bullied as a result of her helpless appearance. However she eventually overcomes her ordeal and joins the Specialized Extracurricular Execution Squad after awakening to a Persona. Her Persona is Lucia.

- Kazuya Nakai as Shinjiro Aragaki:

Despite his strained relationship with Akihito and Mitsuru, Shinjiro reconsiders rejoining the Specialized Extracurricular Execution Squad. His Persona is Castor.

- Maaya Sakamoto as Aegis:

Aegis was created by the Kirijo Group as part of their Anti-Shadow Weapons research initiative in order to hunt Shadows. She was purposely designed as a humanoid robot and given a personality in the hopes that she would manifest the ability to summon a Persona. Aegis reactivates after having been dormant for many years and proceeds to carry out a mission to protect Makoto despite not knowing how that mission came to be. She then joins the Specialized Extracurricular Execution Squad. Her Persona is Palladion.

- Megumi Ogata as Ken Amada:

Ken is a fifth-grade elementary school student who is sent to live at the Iwatodai Dormitory under the pretense of his living circumstances. However in actuality it is because he possesses the potential to summon a Persona and joins the Specialized Extracurricular Execution Squad when he eventually does so. Despite living with his upperclassmen, Ken has an uncharacteristically firm, adult personality. His Persona is Nemesis.

- Shinya Takahashi as Koromaru (uncredited):

An albino dog. Koromaru was forced to live as a stray for a long time when its owner was killed in an accident. This led Koromaru to become well known in the neighborhood because of its still unwavering faithfulness to its deceased owner. Koromaru is also the only animal to awaken a Persona and when found by the Iwatodai dorm residents, they adopt him as a member of the Specialized Extracurricular Execution Squad. Koromaru's Persona is Cerberus. Takahashi is unlisted in the film's credits, with Koromaru's voice actor being labeled as "???".

- Isamu Tanonaka as Igor:

Master of the Velvet Room, a place which exists in the realm between dreams and reality. Like the previous film, Tanonaka was once again credited as a special performance via the use of archived audio recordings from his role in the Persona 3 game.

- Miyuki Sawashiro as:

- Elizabeth:
Igor's aide in the Velvet Room. Elizabeth has a strange interest in the real world.

- Chidori Yoshino:
A girl who always wears the same blank expression on her face. Though Chidori appears to lack empathy for others, Junpei finds her as a curious acquaintance whilst unaware that she is the third member of the malicious group, Strega. She can summon a Persona without an Evoker which causes her intense physical pain. Her Persona is Medea.

=== Supporting ===
- Hideyuki Hori as Shuji Ikutsuki

Chairman of the board committee at Gekkoukan High School and continuing club adviser to the Specialized Extracurricular Execution Squad. He can experience the Dark Hour despite not being able to summon a Persona and coordinates the movements of the club from a computer in the Iwatodai Dormitory.

- Nobutoshi Canna as Takaya Sakaki:

The de facto leader of a mysterious group of Persona users called Strega who had been covertly observing the activities of the Specialized Extracurricular Execution Squad. Takaya has an uncannily charismatic personality which he uses as a front for more malicious schemes. He can summon a Persona without the use of an Evoker albeit at great physical pain. His Persona is Hypnos.

- Masaya Onosaka as Jin Shirato:

Jin is the brains of Strega and acts as Takaya's second-in-command. He has a long history with Takaya and knows him quite well. Jin can also summon a Persona without an Evoker at the cost of physical pain. His Persona is Moros.

- Yasunori Masutani as Takeharu Kirijo:

Current head of the Kirijo Group, Mitsuru's father and son of Koetsu Kirijo.

- Yuka Komatsu as Isako Toriumi:

The homeroom teacher of class 2F at Gekkoukan High School.

- Fumiko Orikasa as Maiko Oohashi:

A little girl who often visits Koromaru's shrine. Orisaka reprised her role in the film from the Persona 3 Drama CDs.

== Production ==
Persona 3 The Movie: #2 Midsummer Knight's Dream was animated by A-1 Pictures. The main staff consisted of the same people behind No. 1, Spring of Birth along with a few modifications.

=== Development ===
The staff list is as follows.

- Script – Jun Kumagai
- Supervisor – Seiji Kishi
- Character Design – Keisuke Watabe
- Animation Direction – Keisuke Watabe
- Executive Animation Director – Tomomi Ishikawa and Yae Ootsuka
- Action Director – Ryo Tanaka
- Creature Design – Kyouma Aki
- Prop Design – Shinobu Tsuneki
- Color Coordinator – Saori Goda
- Art Designer – Kaoru Aoki
- Art Director – Toshihiro Kohama
- Composite Director – Hideki Imaizumi
- Visual Designer – Junpei Takatsu
- Editor – Takashi Sakurai
- Chapter 2 Director – Tomohisa Taguchi

=== Music ===
The background music for the film was composed by Tetsuya Kobayashi.

The film's main theme song is "Fate is In Our Hands", composed and arranged by Shoji Meguro and performed by Lotus Juice.

Persona 3 The Movie #2 Midsummer Knight's Dream Theme Song CD
No.	Title	Vocalist	Length
1.	"Fate is In Our Hands"	Lotus Juice	04:46
2.	"Mass Destruction -Lotus Juice Remix-"	Lotus Juice	04:25
3.	"Deep Breath Deep Breath -Lotus Juice Remix-"	Lotus Juice	05:16
4.	"Fate is In Our Hands -karaoke ver.-"	Lotus Juice	04:45
Total length:			19:12

== Marketing ==
=== Previews ===
#2 Midsummer Knight's Dream was first teased in a post-credits sequence at the end of the Persona 3 The Movie: No. 1, Spring of Birth feature film which began screening in Japan from November 23, 2013.

The first official trailer saw its release on February 15, 2014, and showcased a brief recap of the events of Chapter 1, along with footage of a host of new characters including Aegis, Ken Amada, Koromaru and his Persona, Cerberus and the malefic group known as Strega. The trailer also featured dialogue by Maaya Sakamoto as the voice of Aegis as well as the main theme song for the film, titled "Fate is In Our Hands" by Lotus Juice".

=== Promotion ===
The film was first unveiled in an announcement at the end of No. 1, Spring of Birth which stated that the film would be "comming [sic] early summer 2014". The official website was later updated with the first teaser image for the film which showcased Aegis in the same scene.

=== Reception ===
Richard Eisenbeis of Kotaku gives the movie more positive review than the first film, commenting "while the first movie suffered somewhat from its limited scope as the story's beginning, Midsummer Knight's Dream is where the tale really hits its stride". He praised the movie impressively takes a fourth of the overall story and makes it largely standalone by focusing on a thematic arc and character development. Adding that a fan of the game or just someone continuing on from the last film will no doubt enjoy the sequel. Most of the praised goes to the vast development of Makoto and the new characters introduced; Koromaru, Ken, and Aigis. He remarked that "Makoto's personal struggle with his insecurities is the movie's central theme and the consequences of how his doubts affect his performance have lasting consequences for him beyond this single film". He also enjoyed Makoto's relationship with Aigis, making it easier to relate to the epilogue, The Answer from Persona 3 FES, where it is Aigis, not Makoto who is the main player character. And while he thinks that the fan service was a bit too much, "the fanservice is also the basis for some genuinely funny comedy—especially as the male trio of characters go around the beach hitting on every girl they come across." However, Eisenbeis expressed his disappointment of the way of the mysteries from the first movie "are explained through long conversations of direct exposition." And while no doubt the movie makes for a good introduction to the new characters, it also made some of the main cast members that debuted in the first film, particularly Junpei, Mitsuru, and Fuka, reduced to supporting roles without any further character development, comparing them to "might as well be lampposts for all they add to the plot".

== Sequel ==
A sequel, titled Persona 3 The Movie: #3 Falling Down, was released April 4, 2015.
