= Mitsuru Kirijo =

Fictional character in the Persona series, appearing in Persona 3

- Persona character
- Mitsuru Kirijo, as she appears in Persona 3.
- First game: Persona 3 (2006)
- Voiced by: English: Tara Platt; Allegra Clark (Reload); Japanese: Rie Tanaka
- Portrayed by: Asami Tano (musical)

In-universe information
- Nationality: Japanese

Mitsuru Kirijo (Japanese: 桐条 美鶴, Hepburn: Kirijō Mitsuru) is a character in the Persona series, appearing as a main character in Persona 3. She is the heiress and eventual owner of the Kirijo Group and the, leader of an organization called SEES (Specialized Extracurricular Execution Squad), which the main characters of the game participate in to fight creatures called Shadows.

== Concept and creation ==
Mitsuru Kirijo is the only child of the head of the Kirijo Group, Takeharu Kirijo and a top-ranking valedictorian and student council president. In battle, she wields one-handed swords such as rapiers and sabers and Ice-based magic. Her Personas are Penthesilea (ペンテシレア, Penteshirea) and Artemisia (アルテミシア, Arutemishia) of The Empress Arcana.

She is voiced by Rie Tanaka in Japanese and Tara Platt in English. Shigenori Soejima created Mitsuru to be a tough-looking woman on the exterior, but with a weak side in the interior. She is portrayed by Asami Tano in Persona 3: The Weird Masquerade, the Persona 4 Arena stage play, and the Persona 4 Arena Ultimax Song Project stage play.

== Appearances ==
Mitsuru appears in Persona 3. She has been battling Shadows since she was a little girl, as the unofficial leader of SEES (Special Extracurricular Execution Squad). At the beginning of the game she avoids battle and acts as a support character, offering analysis and advice. She joins the party in combat only after the discovery of Fuuka Yamagishi, whose Persona's analysis power is much stronger. Throughout the story, Mitsuru hides many details about Tartarus and the Dark Hour from the group, due to feelings of guilt over her family's involvement in the accident that created them. Since her grandfather was responsible for everything, she believes that she alone bears the burden of setting the world right. Her Persona was artificially induced to allow her to participate in the battle against the Shadows. Mitsuru is the only SEES member that had her ability to summon a Persona forced on her. Mitsuru loses all will to fight after Ikutsuki kills her father, since restoring the family honor is meaningless without a family. She regains her resolve thanks to some intervention from Yukari. She decides to take over leadership of the Kirijo Group after the conflict with Nyx is finished and she graduates high school.

Mitsuru appears as a playable character in Persona 4 Arena, which takes place over two years after the events of "The Answer". Now 20 years old, Mitsuru is a university student and the leader of the Shadow Operatives, a group composed of Persona users that fights Shadows. She joins Aigis and Akihiko to search for the Anti-Shadow weapon Labrys that disappeared from her plane. Her Persona is Artemisia.

== Reception ==
Mitsuru has received generally positive reception. She was named one of the 10 best Persona characters by Kimberley Wallace of Game Informer. She praised Mitsuru for being a self-actualizing person and for how caring she is. Wallace also regarded her as the best female character in role-playing games and noted the relationship between the Persona 3 protagonist and her as "thoroughly enjoy[able]." Meghan Sullivan of IGN also ranked her among the best Persona characters, similarly praising her for being a caring and strong character. Mike Fahey of Kotaku called her the series "greatest heroine," identifying her "power" and "confidence" as two of her strong qualities.

When playing as a male character in Persona 3, Cassandra Khaw of USGamer found her "accomplished and elegant"; however, when she played as a female character, she found her "too distant." Kotaku writer Leigh Alexander discussed how her perspective changed between playing Persona 3 as a male character and as a female character regarding Mitsuru; where she found Mitsuru admirable when playing as a male character, she found her "irritatingly perfect."

In "Comparative Analysis of Storytelling Technique in Kingdom Hearts II (2005) and Persona 3 Portable (2009)" Shazwin Bt. Sahmir and Norlela Ismail from University Teknologi Mara noted that the character's relationship with the protagonist tends to depend in Persona 3 Portable depending on the gender chosen. The male's bad choice will say she is unreliable while the female ones will ask in worry about her wellbeing. In "Rules, Rhetoric, and Genre: Procedural Rhetoric in Persona 3" T. Harper from Games and Culture noted Mitsuru's character arc goes along Yukari Takeba's as both evolve their Personas when they discover more knowledge about their parents. Qipeng Gao in The Journal of Intercultural Mediation and Communication used Persona 3 as an example of changes made in video game localization, noting how to reflect her background as well as her social status, the original Japanese version featured Mitsuru code-switching by interspersing her dialogue with English phrases. In order to convey the same cultural stereotype of prestige, the English localization changed her secondary language to French.
