= List of Persona 3 characters =

Atlus's 2006 role-playing video game Persona 3 focuses on the exploits of the Specialized Extracurricular Execution Squad (SEES), a group of high-schoolers defending their home city from monsters known as Shadows. Persona 3 is set in a fictional Japanese city in the year 2009. Due to past events, there is a hidden period between one day and the next, known as the "Dark Hour", during which most people become unconscious (a state the game calls "Transmogrification", symbolized by normal people turning into floating coffins), and Shadows feed on the minds of those still aware of their surroundings. In addition, a large tower called Tartarus, filled with Shadows, rises out of the ground during the Dark Hour. SEES is composed of students attending Gekkoukan High School. The player names and controls the game's protagonist, who leads SEES in its exploration of Tartarus. Persona 3 mixes elements of role-playing and simulation games: during the day, the player attends school, and is able to spend time with other characters, forming relationships known as Social Links. These Social Links, when formed, have gameplay benefits, increasing the player's proficiency in battle.

To combat Shadows, each member of SEES is capable of summoning a Persona, a being which is a manifestation of one's psyche. Persona-users summon their Personas by firing a gun-like object called an Evoker at their head. Shigenori Soejima designed the world and cast of Persona 3. The members of SEES include Yukari Takeba, a popular girl; Junpei Iori, a class clown and the Protagonist's best friend; Akihiko Sanada, the captain of Gekkoukan's boxing team; Mitsuru Kirijo, Gekkoukan's student council president; Fuuka Yamagishi, a shy girl who takes on a support role in battle; Aigis, a female android designed to fight Shadows; Ken Amada, an elementary school student whose mother was killed by a Persona-user; Koromaru, a dog capable of summoning a Persona; and Shinjiro Aragaki, a returning member of SEES who had previously left the team. The group encounters other Persona-users who are working against their efforts to eradicate Shadows, Tartarus, and the Dark Hour.

Atlus released an enhanced version of Persona 3 entitled Persona 3: FES. The new game makes revisions to the original gameplay of Persona 3 (referred to as "The Journey"), and adds a new epilogue to the original story, entitled "The Answer". The Answer introduces a new character, Metis, an anti-Shadow weapon like Aigis. In 2009, Atlus released a PlayStation Portable remake of Persona 3 entitled Persona 3 Portable, which adds more characters, including appearances by characters from the successor to Persona 3, Persona 4, released in 2008. Several Persona 3 characters also went on to make appearances in 2012's Persona 4 Arena and 2014's Persona 4 Arena Ultimax, both set two years after the events of "The Answer".

== SEES members ==
The members of SEES, the playable characters of Persona 3. From left to right, starting from top: Aigis, Shinjiro, Fuuka; Yukari, the Protagonist, Junpei; Koromaru, Ken, Mitsuru and Akihiko.

The Specialized Extracurricular Execution Squad (特別課外活動部, Tokubetsu Kagai Katsudō-bu; lit. Special Extracurricular Activity Department), or SEES for short, is officially a school group of Gekkoukan High School. In reality, they hunt down Shadows and investigate the Dark Hour with the support of the Kirijo Group. All of the members of SEES are Persona-users, who live together in a specialized dorm. In the final events of the game, the group is re-designated as the "Nyx Annihilation Team" (滅びをもたらすもの, Horobi o Motorasu Mono; lit. "Those Who Bring About the End").

=== Protagonist ===
Voiced by:

English: Yuri Lowenthal (male), Aleks Le (male, Reload), Laura Bailey (female)
Japanese: Akira Ishida (male), Marina Inoue (female)

The protagonist is the nameable main player-controlled character of Persona 3. He is named Makoto Yuki (結城 理, Yuki Makoto) in the film adaptation, Persona 3: Dancing in Moonlight, and most of his appearances. Having moved into the dorm in the introduction of the game, he learns his ability to summon The Fool arcana Persona Orpheus (オルフェウス, Orufeusu) and the Death arcana Persona Thanatos (タナトス, Tanatosu) before he's later appointed the team's leader in combat. He is unique among his cohorts in that he has the ability to carry multiple Personas and switch between them during battle. Over the course of the game, he also gains Messiah (メサイア, Mesaia) of The Judgement Arcana and Orpheus Telos (オルフェウス･改, Orufeusu Kai) of The Fool Arcana in Persona 3 FES. With the power of the Wild Card he has access to over 150 different Personas. He is also the only character with access to the Velvet Room, in which the player is able to fuse together multiple Personas together to create a new, more powerful one. Over the course of the game, the player is challenged to manage his day-to-day schedule as he attends school, takes part in extracurricular activities, and spends time with classmates and other characters. Igor, the proprietor of the Velvet Room, encourages him to form Social Links with people, as they will determine his potential in combat. Within the simulation elements of Persona 3, the player is able to form Social Links with characters in-game, each represented by one of the Major Arcana and granting various bonuses during Persona fusion, increasing the player's proficiency in battle. Soejima took longer to design him than any other character, as the game's other characters would be made to complement his design. Soejima wrote in Art of Persona 3, "Initially, he looked more honest, like an ordinary, handsome young man. But, I worked to achieve greater ambiguity in his expression." In Persona 3 Portable, released on the PlayStation Portable in 2009, an option was added to control a female protagonist. Unlike the male protagonist, the female protagonist through her dialogue opinions, is shown to be a very upbeat and energetic person, sometimes pulling jokes on her friends, so they could be considered opposites. Later games explain that the two protagonists exist within different timelines.

In the manga adaptation of Persona 3, he is portrayed as a quiet teenager who often tired or drowsy, who likes to eat and cook food. In the animated movie adaptation, he is portrayed as an ambivalent individual with an initially neutral viewpoint on the film's themes of life and death, making his growth via newfound experiences the focus of the movie. He also gains his new Personas from battles of against Arcana Shadows during full moon, instead of Social Links.

In the stage adaptation, Persona 3: The Weird Masquerade, the male protagonist is named Sakuya Shiomi (汐見 朔也, Shiomi Sakuya) and he is portrayed by Shouta Aoi, while the female version is named Kotone Shiomi (汐見 琴音, Shiomi Kotone) and she is portrayed by Kana Asumi.

=== Yukari Takeba ===
Voiced by:

English: Michelle Ruff, Heather Gonzalez (Reload)
Japanese: Megumi Toyoguchi

Yukari Takeba (岳羽 ゆかり, Takeba Yukari) is one of the protagonist's classmates. Yukari's zeal for investigation brings SEES a lot of trouble, but also gains the group valuable allies and information. Her Personas are Io (イオ) and Isis (イシス, Ishisu) of The Lovers Arcana. She wields a bow and arrows in battle as well as Wind elemental magic.

It is revealed that Yukari has been on her own for quite some time. Her father died a mysterious death a decade ago, in 1999, and her mother neglects her in favor of a string of shallow (and possibly abusive) boyfriends. She slowly begins to open up to the protagonist because he is an orphan (having lost both of his parents in the same incident) and can understand her isolation. Midway through the game, Yukari discovers that her father was involved in the incident that unleashed the Shadows upon the world. Yukari is forced to face her anger and overcome it, and decides to fight for her friends and her father's memory.

In the Lovers Arcana (恋愛, Ren'ai) Social Link, which represents a choice for the protagonist's journey, the Protagonist helps Yukari mend her relationship with her mother. If the protagonist makes the correct choices, Yukari will fall in love with him. If the player chooses not to date any girls, Yukari will appear for all the dating events.

In Persona 3: FES's The Answer, Yukari is the group member who is most reluctant to go back into battle against the Shadows and seems that she only wants to move on with her life. However, she fell in love with the protagonist, and as such, is bitter and jealous towards Aigis, who was not only able to spend the last moment with the protagonist before his death, but also inherited his powers. As such, Yukari constantly shows random mood swings towards her. After witnessing the protagonist's sacrifice and the burden he must carry, she finally overcomes her jealousy, apologizing to Aigis and offering to become her roommate.

Yukari appears as a playable character in the fighting game Persona 4 Arena Ultimax. After the end of Persona 3, Yukari decided to put herself through college working as a model, and her proficiency with a bow landed her the television role as Suzuko Kujakuin (孔雀院 鈴子, Kujakuin Suzuko), otherwise known as Feather Pink (フェザーピンク, Fezā Pinku), on Phoenix Sentai Featherman Victory, which is part of the Phoenix Sentai franchise, a show in the series that parodies the Super Sentai series. While filming on location, a real helicopter appears with Mitsuru coming out of it, asking Yukari for her help in a new emergency. Within the events of the game, her Persona is Isis.

Shigenori Soejima comments that he designed Yukari with the contemporary look, which caused her to be popular on and off with the development team during the making of the game. She is portrayed by Maho Tomita in Persona 3: The Weird Masquerade.

=== Junpei Iori ===
Voiced by:

English: Vic Mignogna, Zeno Robinson (Reload)
Japanese: Kohsuke Toriumi

Junpei Iori (伊織 順平, Iori Junpei) is the protagonist's best friend, though the two often find themselves at odds. Junpei is a poor student who plays the class clown in order to mask his insecurities. Junpei becomes a member of SEES near the beginning of the game. Akihiko finds him crying in a convenience store during the Dark Hour, and does not realize that he has the potential to call a Persona until Akihiko tells him about it. His first Persona is Hermes (ヘルメス, Herumesu) and later obtains Trismegistus (トリスメギストス, Torisumegisutosu), both of The Magician Arcana. His chosen weapon is a two-handed sword, which he wields like a baseball bat. He also learns some Fire-based skills. His decision to join SEES is a swift one, and Yukari is dismayed when he immediately moves into their dorm.

Initially, Junpei fights because "playing hero" makes him feel like less of a loser. He uses his place in SEES to prop up his low self-esteem, neglects his classwork, and snaps at the protagonist out of jealousy over his unique Persona abilities. Junpei only becomes more serious after he meets Strega member Chidori. They fall for each other, and though she continues to fight SEES, her feelings for Junpei eventually come into conflict with her loyalty to Takaya and her fear of death. When Takaya fatally attacks Junpei, Chidori uses her Persona powers to save his life at the cost of her own. Junpei becomes a more-focused and determined young man after Chidori's death.

In Persona 3 Portable, Junpei becomes the Social Link for the Magician Arcana (魔術師, Majutsushi), representing action, initiative, and immaturity, when the player controls the female protagonist. Junpei's relationship with the female protagonist remains strictly platonic, because of his feelings towards Chidori.

Junpei appears as a playable character in Persona 4 Arena Ultimax. After graduating, Mitsuru hired him to be one of her "Shadow Operatives" in fighting Shadow appearances. However, on the side, he coaches a little league baseball team. While traveling to a game, he falls asleep on the train and misses his stop, ending up in Inaba. There, he reunites with the other Shadow Operatives and becomes involved in the sudden onset of the red fog. During the game, he uses the Persona Trismegistus.

Shigenori Soejima has stated that Junpei is "the most important character when it comes to getting the player to buy into the story," because he is the major character who looks and acts the most like a normal teenager. He is portrayed by Genki Okawa in Persona 3: The Weird Masquerade.

=== Mitsuru Kirijo ===
Voiced by:

English: Tara Platt, Allegra Clark (Reload)
Japanese: Rie Tanaka

Mitsuru Kirijo (桐条 美鶴, Kirijō Mitsuru) is the only child of the head of the Kirijo Group, Takeharu Kirijo. Beautiful and elegant, she is the school's top ranking valedictorian and student council president. In battle, she wields one-handed swords such as rapiers and sabers and Ice-based magic. Her Personas are Penthesilea (ペンテシレア, Penteshirea) and Artemisia (アルテミシア, Arutemishia) of The Empress Arcana.

Mitsuru has been battling Shadows since she was a little girl, as the unofficial leader of SEES. At the beginning of the game she avoids battle and acts as a support character, offering analysis and advice. She joins the party in combat only after the discovery of Fuuka Yamagishi, whose Persona's analysis power is much stronger.

Throughout the story, Mitsuru hides many details about Tartarus and the Dark Hour from the group, due to feelings of guilt over her family's involvement in the accident that created them. Since her grandfather was responsible for everything, she believes that she alone bears the burden of setting the world right. Her Persona was artificially induced to allow her to participate in the battle against the Shadows. Mitsuru is the only SEES member that had her ability to summon a Persona forced on her.

Mitsuru loses all will to fight after Ikutsuki kills her father, since restoring the family honor is meaningless without a family. She regains her resolve thanks to some intervention from Yukari. She decides to take over leadership of the Kirijo Group after the conflict with Nyx is finished and she graduates high school.

In the Empress Arcana (女帝, Jotei) Social Link, representing life brought forth from motherhood, the protagonist will help free her from some of the expectations attached to her family name. In order to attract such an ambitious young woman he must maximize his Academic statistic, and rank first in his class for at least one exam. If the player makes the correct choices, Mitsuru will fall in love with the protagonist.

Mitsuru appears as a playable character in Persona 4 Arena, which takes place over two years after the events of "The Answer". Now 20 years old, Mitsuru is a university student and the leader of the Shadow Operatives, a group composed of Persona users that fights Shadows. She joins Aigis and Akihiko to search for the Anti-Shadow weapon Labrys that disappeared from her plane. Her Persona is Artemisia. Shigenori Soejima created Mitsuru to be a tough-looking woman on the exterior, but with a weak side in the interior. She is portrayed by Asami Tano in Persona 3: The Weird Masquerade, the Persona 4 Arena stage play, and the Persona 4 Arena Ultimax Song Project stage play.

=== Akihiko Sanada ===
Voiced by:

English: Liam O'Brien, Alejandro Saab (Reload)
Japanese: Hikaru Midorikawa

Akihiko Sanada (真田 明彦, Sanada Akihiko) is the mature and confident captain of his school's boxing team, as well as a senior at Gekkoukan High. He is a hard worker who balances a high GPA with near-constant training. Since Akihiko is a boxer, he uses gloves and claws in battle, but his Personas also let him wield Electricity-based magic. His Personas are Polydeuces (ポリデュークス, Poridyūkusu) and Caesar (カエサル, Kaesaru) of The Emperor Arcana. He cannot fight for the first part of the game, due to injuries received during the Dark Hour.

Akihiko was one of the three Persona users who founded SEES, alongside Mitsuru and Shinjiro. He and Shinjiro were close friends as children, having grown up in an orphanage together with Akihiko's now-deceased sister Miki. However, one night when the two were chasing down a Shadow, Shinjiro's Persona went out of control and an innocent bystander was killed: Ken Amada's mother. After the incident, Shinjiro left SEES and his friendship with Akihiko became strained. The two only reconnect when Ken joins SEES, and Akihiko convinces Shinjiro to rejoin the group in order to protect him.

When Akihiko realizes that Ken only volunteered for SEES as a means to get revenge on Shinjiro, he tries to save both of them from making grave mistakes, but he arrives too late. Though Ken lets go of his vendetta, Shinjiro is fatally shot while protecting him from Takaya. In the end, Shinjiro's way of facing death head on gave Akihiko the courage to carry on in spite of all his losses. Akihiko is determined that Shinjiro's death not be in vain and to be just as fearless in the face of his own mortality.

In Persona 3: FES, a door which shows Akihiko's past reveals why the Evoker looks like a handgun. When Mitsuru first asked him to join her in fighting Shadows, she decided to create an Evoker that would grab his attention, leading to the Evoker's gun shape.

In Persona 3 Portable, he is the Social Link for the Star Arcana (星, Hoshi), representing a glimmer of hope, but only when the player controls the female protagonist. In his Social Link he expresses his deep memory towards Miki and how the female protagonist reminded him of her. With the correct choices, Akihiko will fall in love with the female protagonist.

He also appears in the non-canonical anime Persona: Trinity Soul, which takes place in a sequel of the Persona 3 world. 10 years older, he no longer has his Persona due to his age.

Akihiko is a playable character in Persona 4 Arena, which takes place over two years after "The Answer". Akihiko went to college after graduating high school, joining Mitsuru's Shadow Operatives, but left school to travel the world and train his body to become stronger. His travels came to an end after being called by Mitsuru to search for Labrys. While in Inaba, he develops a rival/mentor relationship with Chie Satonaka. His Persona in the game is Caesar.

In Persona 4 Arena Ultimax, one week after the events of Arena, Akihiko is captured along with Mitsuru and Aigis, appearing on the Midnight Channel to the members of the Inaba Investigation Team.

Shigenori Soejima had wanted to create a "cool upperclassman" when Akihiko was developed with "an impressive aura about him". He is portrayed by Yuki Fujiwara in Persona 3: The Weird Masquerade, the Persona 4 Arena stage play, and the Persona 4 Arena Ultimax Song Project stage play.

=== Fuuka Yamagishi ===
Voiced by:

English: Wendee Lee (Persona 4 Arena onwards), Suzie Yeung (Reload)
Japanese: Mamiko Noto

Fuuka Yamagishi (山岸 風花, Yamagishi Fūka) is a junior at Gekkoukan High. She is found to be a Persona-user by Akihiko, although he suspects that she would be unable to fight. Her meekness makes her the target of bullying by several female students. In May, one of her bullies is found outside of the front of the school gate, unconscious. A rumor begins to spread that she was attacked by a ghost inside Gekkoukan. SEES later learns from Natsuki Moriyama that she and her friends—the students responsible for bullying her—had locked Fuuka in the school gymnasium; the same day, they returned to let her out for fear that she would commit suicide, but found no one inside. Mitsuru realizes that Fuuka has been trapped inside Tartarus, which replaces Gekkoukan during the Dark Hour. The team locates her inside the tower that night - during a full moon - and finds that she had been able to avoid detection by Shadows.

During the return trip, Akihiko realizes that the Arcana Shadows are appearing on full moons, and Fuuka senses two Arcana Shadows attacking Mitsuru and Yukari at the entrance of Tartarus. Due to the Shadows frequently changing their weaknesses, Mitsuru and Yukari find themselves unable to land a hit and are defeated before the rest of SEES can back them up. Worse, Natsuki has been beckoned into Tartarus, putting her in danger as well. Fuuka is able to summon her Persona for the first time, and finds that she can detect the weaknesses of the enemies, allowing SEES to defeat them. The ordeal causes her to fall unconscious for several days, after which Fuuka accepts Mitsuru's offer to join SEES, and moves into the dorm with the rest of the team. She replaces Mitsuru as the player's support character, and Mitsuru becomes an active combatant in battle. In June, Yukari asks her to research an incident related to Gekkoukan which occurred ten years ago, as she believes Mitsuru is hiding something about the origins of Tartarus, as well as her father's death. Her Personas are Lucia (ルキア, Rukia) and Juno (ユノ, Yuno) of The Priestess Arcana.

In the Priestess Arcana (女教皇, Onnakyōkō) Social Link, representing contemplation and inner knowledge, the protagonist helps Fuuka become more confident and believe in herself. She appears in Persona 4 Arena as a non-playable character in the game's story and as an optional commentator.

Soejima, in his designing Fuuka, tried to make her not seem weak or helpless. In addition, he worked to "convey her strong will through her facial expressions." She is portrayed by Marina Tanoue in Persona 3: The Weird Masquerade.

=== Aigis ===
Voiced by:

English: Karen Strassman, Dawn M. Bennett (Reload)
Japanese: Maaya Sakamoto

Aigis (アイギス, Aigisu; "Aegis" in The Episode of Aegis) is an android created by the Kirijo Group. She is the last surviving model of their experimental anti-Shadow weapon. In combat, she uses a wide variety of high-tech weapons, from machine guns and rocket launchers to long-range guns and “rocket punches.” Her Personas are Palladion (パラディオン, Paradion) and Athena (アテナ, Atena) of The Chariot Arcana.

Aigis is introduced during SEES' summer beach vacation, where she is simultaneously the target of Mitsuru's retrieval mission and Junpei's "Operation Babe Hunt." She immediately shows an instinctual interest in protecting the protagonist, which she cannot explain. Ikutsuki decides to make her a member of SEES and she later enrolls at Gekkoukan High School. When Ryoji Mochizuki transfers to Gekkoukan High, she immediately acts hostile towards him and warns the protagonist that Ryoji is dangerous.

Aigis realizes why she feels such hostility toward Ryoji and hunts him down one night, during a full moon, where she confronts him on Moonlight Bridge. Ten years ago Aigis' mission was to defeat Death and avert the arrival of Nyx. During the battle at that very location on Moonlight Bridge, she realized Death could not be defeated and decided to seal the entity away in a young boy who was the sole survivor of a nearby car crash. That young boy was the protagonist and is the reason behind her instincts to protect him. Her explanation triggers Ryoji's memories and he finally realizes that he is, in fact, the incarnation of Death. In an attempt to fulfill her purpose, Aigis attacks Ryoji, but he easily defends himself, heavily damaging her in the process.

The Kirijo Group are able to repair Aigis and when she returns, she begins to shows more human-like qualities and emotions. She decides to stand against the power of Nyx with her friends in SEES. After defeating Nyx, she is the only one who remembers Tartarus, the Dark Hour, and the protagonist's sacrifice during his borrowed month of life after the defeat of Nyx. She allows him to live like a normal student for the few precious weeks that he has. Finally, on Graduation Day, as she is holding the protagonist in her lap, she suddenly realizes what it means to be human and also the true purpose in her existence is to protect the life of the protagonist. Yet sadly, as soon as she comes to this revelation, the protagonist begins to fall asleep in her arms. As she vows to always protect his life, the protagonist passes away.

In the Persona 3: FES expansion, the player can access an epilogue to the main game called The Answer ("Episode Aegis" in the Japanese version). Aigis is the main playable protagonist, inheriting the power to summon multiple Personas including Orpheus (オルフェウス, Orufeusu) of The Fool Arcana, but loses the ability to use Orgia Mode. During her story, Aigis is filled with grief over the death of the main story's protagonist and wishes to become a mere machine as she once was, until Metis makes her realize that she's still able to fulfil her promise made to the main story's protagonist. With this realization, she decides to continue attending Gekkoukan High as Yukari's roommate rather than returning to the lab, as she had initially planned.

The protagonist can also date Aigis in Persona 3: FES and Portable as the Aeon Arcana (永劫, Eigō), and when the Social Link maxes, she will confess her love to the protagonist, regardless of gender and in the female protagonist's case in Portable, Aigis expresses lament towards the female protagonist not being a male.

Aegis: The First Mission follows Aigis' adventures before she sealed Death. She also appears as a playable character in Persona 4 Arena, which takes place over two years after "The Answer". Using Athena as her Persona, Aigis joins Mitsuru and Akihiko in their search of another Anti-Shadow weapon, Labrys, that was stolen from Mitsuru. Also, in Elizabeth's story mode, she, along with her successor and fellow Wild Card wielder Yu Narukami, help Elizabeth understand the true nature of the Wild Card.

Aigis was created to remind people of the robots being used in manga, even though Shigenori Soejima admits that he initially had hesitations about her creation since a robot like her does not exist currently in the modern world. However, he also noted that she came to be a vital part of creating a unique identity for the game, and that she was one of the most popular characters among the developers. She is portrayed by ZAQ in Persona 3: The Weird Masquerade and Kanon Miyahara in the Persona 4 Arena and the Persona 4 Arena Ultimax Song Project stage plays.

=== Shinjiro Aragaki ===
Voiced by:

English: Grant George, Justice Slocum (Reload)
Japanese: Kazuya Nakai

Shinjiro Aragaki (荒垣 真次郎, Aragaki Shinjirō) is a senior at Gekkoukan High School and a former member of SEES. Two years prior, while the group was hunting a Shadow, he briefly lost control of his Persona, Castor (カストール, Kasutōru) of The Hierophant Arcana, resulting in the death of Ken's mother. This prompted him to quit SEES. Shinjiro is a childhood friend of Akihiko, who continually asks him to forget the past and rejoin SEES. He continually refuses the offers, only returning to fight when he learns that Ken has joined the team as a Persona-user. When Shinjiro is lured by Ken behind Port Island Station to be killed, he accepts the death of Ken's mother as his fault, saying death is what he deserves. However, Shinjiro warns Ken that if he kills him, he will "end up like [Shinjiro] and will regret it." Takaya, a member of Strega, intervenes and attempts to shoot Ken, instead hitting Shinjiro, who sacrifices himself to save Ken. Before he dies, he tells Ken and the rest of SEES, "This is how it should be". At his funeral, it is learned that Shinjiro rarely attended school and was generally not well known among the student body. During the final confrontation with Nyx, the protagonist hears Shinjiro's voice cheering him on along with the voices of the living SEES members saying "Alright, let's do this".

In battle, Shinjiro attacks with blunt weapons. He is forced to regularly take special suppressant pills to properly control his Persona, at the cost of his health. Shinjiro represents the Social Link of the Moon Arcana (月, Tsuki), representing a source of fear and false illusions, in Persona 3 Portable, if the player is controlling the female protagonist. At the end of the Social Link, the female protagonist finds Shinjiro's watch that he lost. Upon giving him the watch, Shinjiro will survive the fatal shooting from Takaya in the October 4th event, but remains hospitalized for the rest of the game. In a new cycle, he is discharged from the hospital on the final day of the game to be with the female protagonist. He is portrayed by Ray Fujita in Persona 3: The Weird Masquerade.

=== Ken Amada ===
Voiced by:

English: Cindy Robinson (Ultimax onwards), Justine Lee (Reload)
Japanese: Megumi Ogata

Ken Amada (天田 乾, Amada Ken) is an elementary school student capable of summoning a Persona, and the youngest member of SEES. His Personas are Nemesis (ネメシス, Nemeshisu) and Kala-Nemi (カーラ・ネミ, Kāra Nemi) of The Justice Arcana. His mother was killed two years prior to the events of Persona 3 by a Persona-user, although the death was officially listed as an accident. He moves into the dorm in July, when it is discovered that he is a Persona-user, and later joins SEES as a fighter. In August, he learns that his mother was killed by Shinjiro Aragaki, a former member of SEES, who briefly lost control of his Persona. On October 4, during a full moon, Ken lures Shinjiro to an alley behind Port Island Station, intending to kill him and avenge his mother. However, Takaya, a member of the group Strega, intervenes, revealing that Shinjiro will soon die anyway due to his use of Persona-suppressant pills, and that Ken was planning to commit suicide after killing Shinjiro. Takaya resolves to kill both of them first, but Shinjiro blocks his second shot, saving Ken's life. Ken briefly runs from the dorm following the incident; after being encouraged by Akihiko, however, he gains the resolve to return to SEES, and his Persona changes form.

In battle, Ken wields a spear. He chose this as his weapon because it would compensate for his lack of height, although his height makes the weapon more difficult for him to use. His Personas allow him to use Electricity and Light magic to compensate for how difficult a spear is to use for him. Ken is the Social Link for the Justice Arcana (正義, Seigi) in Persona 3 Portable, representing the knowledge of what is right and wrong, if the player is controlling the female protagonist. In the Japanese version of the game, the female protagonist has the option of pursuing a romantic relationship with Ken. Due to cultural differences, his Social Link is slightly edited in the English version in order to make Ken's feelings seem more like a crush with the female protagonist seeing him as a younger brother.

Ken appears as a playable character in Persona 4 Arena Ultimax, fighting alongside Koromaru. Now a teenager, Ken attends Gekkoukan Middle School, and is a member of both the Student Council and the soccer team.

In designing Ken, Soejima focused more on his appearance than his characteristics. He believes the shorts Ken wears give him a "nostalgic" look in contrast to the modern setting of Persona 3, noting in Art of Persona 3 that "kids these days hardly ever wear shorts." Because the character's design is focused on the idea that he is a young boy, Soejima jokingly wrote Ken's name as "Kid Amada" on concept sketches. He is portrayed by Waku Sakaguchi and Tomonori Suzuki in Persona 3: The Weird Masquerade.

=== Koromaru ===
Voiced by: Shinya Takahashi (Persona 3 The Movie, Reload)

Koromaru (コロマル Koromaru) is a Shiba Inu that has the capability to summon a Persona. He has no direct affiliations with Gekkoukan High but was the loyal dog of an unnamed priest who suddenly died due to the Shadows. In grief, Koromaru protected the shrine his master once resided in from Shadows during the Dark Hour until S.E.E.S. investigated the happenings and saw Koromaru downed and beaten after defending the shrine. Koromaru's Persona is Cerberus (ケルベロス Keruberosu) of the Strength Arcana.

When in battle; Koromaru, being a quadruped, uses a specially designed collar to summon his Persona instead of an Evoker. Koromaru has very high base agility and wields a knife by biting it in his mouth and he wears special equipment that only he can wear. His Persona allows him to wield Fire and Darkness attacks along with the capability to instill the "Fear" ailment. If the player is controlling the female protagonist, he replaces Yuko Nishiwaki as the Social Link of the Strength Arcana and can be established after the player has at least rank one of Fuuka Yamagishi's Social Link. In the Social Link, Koromaru is taken on walks and sees the experiences of daily life and bonds with the female protagonist. For both protagonists, there is also a separate walk feature where you can take Koromaru out at night for a walk to occasionally gain Social Link points of other characters or get healing items.

Koromaru also appears as a character in the spinoff sequel Persona 4 Arena Ultimax where he is a tandem character with Ken Amada, now wearing Ken's old jacket from the Persona 3. Unlike the other characters, Koromaru does not appear in Persona 3: The Weird Masquerade, likely due to the difficulties of having a dog act in character and controlled in live action.

=== Metis ===
Voiced by:

English: Stephanie Sheh, Lizzie Freeman (Reload)
Japanese: Chiwa Saitō

Metis (メティス, Metisu) is an android like Aigis, who refers to herself as Aigis' sister. She first appears during the events of The Answer in Persona 3 FES, when she attacks SEES using the Persona Psyche (プシュケイ, Pushukei) of The Hierophant Arcana. The player learns that the day March 31 has been repeating itself over and over, and that the characters are trapped inside the dorm. Metis attempts to kill the members of SEES to end the time loop and save her sister, but is subdued by Aigis. When the player's characters discover the Abyss of Time, an expansive area underneath the dorm connected to the time loop, she joins SEES to help investigate, becoming a character under the control of the player. Aigis later learns that Metis awoke in the Abyss with no memory of her past, and only the knowledge that she had a sister who was in danger. At the conclusion of The Answer, SEES learns that Metis is actually a facet of Aigis' personality, representative of Aigis' humanity, which she had rejected out of despair after the death of the protagonist.

== Antagonists ==
=== Strega ===
The members of Strega. From left to right: Jin Shirato, Takaya Sakaki and Chidori Yoshino.

Strega is a group of three rogue Persona-users who use the Dark Hour for personal benefit. They set up an internet site called "Revenge Request", where users can contract Strega to commit assassinations and other illegal activities. They become enemies of SEES because SEES is trying to put an end to the Dark Hour, as Strega carries out its activities during the Dark Hour.

Near the end of the game, the player discovers that Strega are artificial Persona users created by the Kirijo Group. They were picked up off the street and used as fodder for the corporation's experiments. Because their Personas were not awakened naturally, they must take Persona Suppressants supplied by Ikutsuki, drugs that keep Personas from killing their users, but have lethal side-effects.

==== Takaya Sakaki ====
Voiced by:

English: Derek Stephen Prince, Daman Mills (Reload)
Japanese: Nobutoshi Canna

Takaya Sakaki (榊貴 隆也, Sakaki Takaya) is the confident and charismatic young leader of Strega. He functions as the main antagonist of the game, leading the rival group of Persona-users and setting himself up as a false messiah. In battle, Takaya uses a six-shot revolver to strike down his opponents. Aside from Aigis and Koromaru, he is the only Persona-user in the game who does not use an Evoker to manifest his Persona, instead summoning it "manually" by clutching his head and falling to his knees. His Persona is Hypnos (ヒュプノス, Hyupunosu) of The Fortune arcana.

Since Takaya does not have long to live, he lives fully for the moment, heedless of the harm he causes others. His dearest wish is to see the world end along with his own life. Though he does have some care for Jin and Chidori, he has no qualms about using either of them as tools. At first, he tries to prevent SEES from killing the twelve Arcana Shadows, since it'll end his Revenge Request website business and his 'powers', and as if he is trying to save the world in his own way. But he embraces death once he realizes their true purpose. Near the end of the game he creates a cult centered around the coming of Nyx as a salvation, with himself as the high priest and Jin spreading rumors around the network.

Takaya's final defeat occurs when he tries to forcibly stop SEES from climbing Tartarus and facing Nyx. Afterwards he crawls to the top of the tower to witness the final battle. Before he falls unconscious he calls Jin's name, making his last statement, that he did not want to see the end without him. He is portrayed by Takeya Nishiyama in Persona 3: The Weird Masquerade.

==== Jin Shirato ====
Voiced by:
English: Grant George, Chris Hackney (Reload)
Japanese: Masaya Onosaka

Jin Shirato (白戸 陣, Shirato Jin) is Takaya's faithful right-hand man, acting as his tactical adviser, the webmaster of "Revenge Request," and the occasional voice of reason to prevent Takaya from making foolish choices. He uses grenades and bombs in battle and is also a skilled computer hacker. His Persona is Moros (モロス, Morosu) of The Hermit arcana.

Jin appears very eager to be rid of SEES, since he believes that they are hypocrites who do not appreciate their own power. Despite his strong belief in Takaya's goals, however, he is rational enough to limit his actions when necessary. He is fiercely loyal to Takaya for "showing him out of darkness" and helping him through the Kirijo Group's experiments. In spite of this, he often inadvertently helps SEES by revealing important information, such as the truth behind Strega, their involvement in the coming of Nyx, and Shuji Ikutsuki's real allegiance.

After SEES defeats Jin near the end of the game, he commits suicide with a grenade as a horde of shadows swarm towards him. He is portrayed by Yuichi Matsumoto in Persona 3: The Weird Masquerade.

==== Chidori Yoshino ====
Voiced by:

English: Unknown, Merit Leighton (Reload)
Japanese: Miyuki Sawashiro

Chidori Yoshino (吉野 千鳥, Yoshino Chidori) is the third member of Strega, and is known for her Gothic Lolita dress style, self-harming tendencies, and artistic ability. In battle she utilizes a red chained hand-axe. Her Persona is Medea (メーディア, Mēdia) of The Hanged Man arcana. She uses Medea's ability to radiate life energy to keep Strega from being detected by Fuuka's Persona. Like Takaya, she shows unusual Persona abilities, such as being able to heal living creatures (including her own wounds) and manifest Medea outside of the Dark Hour.

Chidori and Junpei meet by chance at Port Island Station. While she is initially very unpleasant to Junpei because he keeps interrupting her sketching, she eventually opens up to him due to his kindness and persistence. At the same time, Junpei tells her everything about SEES without knowing that she is a member of Strega. Chidori is led to believe that Junpei is SEES' leader.

During the full moon of September, Chidori kidnaps Junpei, thinking that he has the authority to call off SEES' mission to kill the Arcana Shadows. When the plan fails, she is wounded and ends up held in the local hospital. Mitsuru and Akihiko try to interrogate her, but meet little success.

Junpei continues to visit Chidori in the hospital, and the two become closer. He is very concerned about her habit of cutting her wrists. However, after faking his death, Takaya returns to remind her where she truly belongs. Ten days before the first full moon of December, Chidori is broken out of the hospital and rejoins Strega, but her loyalties begin to falter when she is forced to fight Junpei, and when he is wounded by Takaya, she comes to terms with her love for him. She sacrifices her life to save him through the use of her Persona, and ends up giving Junpei some of her Persona's regenerative power, namely the passive skill Spring of Life which restores HP every turn. This results in Junpei's Persona being reborn. After her death, Junpei inherits her sketch-book, which turns out to have been full of pictures of him.

In Persona 3: FES and Persona 3 Portable, it is possible that Chidori revives in the story. However, Chidori has no memories of the events in the game, including Junpei. She is revived when doctors take her corpse in for autopsy. For a tribute, they use the flowers she had in her room and placed them on her chest. Since Chidori constantly gave her life force to them every time Junpei came to visit her, her body took back its energy from the flowers and brought her back to life. It was hinted that Chidori had not completely lost all her memories, and that she had plans to find the person of her dreams as soon as she recovers.

Chidori is confirmed alive in Persona 4 Arena Ultimax. Though she did not appear physically in the game, she was mentioned by Junpei several times while he was daydreaming of proposing to her, before waking up on the train in Arena Ultimax. When fighting against Shadows, Junpei said he wouldn't let Chidori worry about him again. Junpei is seen wearing a cross necklace in Arena Ultimax, which he mentions that it was given to him by her.

She is portrayed by Yuri Hane in Persona 3: The Weird Masquerade.

=== Shuji Ikutsuki ===
Voiced by:

English: Dan Woren, J.B. Blanc (Persona 4 Arena Ultimax), Jake Green (Reload)
Japanese: Hideyuki Hori

Shuji Ikutsuki (幾月 修司, Ikutsuki Shūji) is the chairman of the board at Gekkoukan High School, and an adviser for SEES. He experiences the Dark Hour but does not have a Persona. He is known among the members of SEES for his silly jokes. He establishes a link between twelve greater Shadows that have been attacking the city, and the Dark Hour. He informs SEES that eliminating these twelve Shadows would eliminate the Dark Hour. However, after doing so, SEES learns that they were actually aiding in Ikutsuki's efforts to summon Nyx to Earth and bring about the end of the world. It is later revealed that ten years prior, Ikutsuki worked as a scientist at Kirijo's Ergo Research division, studying Shadows and performing various inhumane experiments while attempting to artificially induce Personas into individuals like Strega and Sho Minazuki, the latter of whom treated him as a father. When confronted, Ikutsuki reprograms Aigis and attempts to offer the members of SEES as sacrifices on a roof of Tartarus. However, his efforts are thwarted by Takeharu Kirijo, Mitsuru's father. The two simultaneously fire guns at each other, killing Takeharu and wounding Ikutsuki. When Aigis breaks free of her reprogramming, Ikutsuki jumps from Tartarus to his death. He is portrayed by Shoichi Honda in Persona 3: The Weird Masquerade - The Blue Awakening, the Persona 4 Arena stage play, and the Persona 4 Ultimax Song Project stage play; and Mitsuru Karahashi in Persona 3: The Weird Masquerade - The Ultramarine Labyrinth and Persona 3: The Weird Masquerade - The Bismuth Crystals.

=== Nyx ===
Nyx (ニュクス, Nyukusu), also known as the "maternal being", is the mother of all Shadows and the final boss of Persona 3. She is drawn to humanity by The Appriser, and would bring about the end of the world if brought to Earth. At the conclusion of Persona 3, the protagonist is able to enter Nyx and becomes the Great Seal to keep it away from humanity, at the cost of their own life. In Persona 3 FES, during The Events of The Answer, Metis informs SEES that Nyx is not a malevolent being, and that a seal would ordinarily not be necessary. However, the Great Seal prevents humanity itself from calling out to Nyx through their own wishes for death. This accumulated malice of the human race manifested in a monster called Erebus, which is attempting to break the seal created by the protagonist.

=== Erebus ===
Erebus (エレボス, Erebosu) is the final boss of The Answer in Persona 3: FES. It is not an actual Shadow - rather, Erebus is a large monster created from the accumulated malice and despair from the human race; it is attempting to break the Great Seal the protagonist created to keep Nyx from returning to Earth. When SEES encounters Erebus, it targets Aigis, who bears the protagonist's "wild card" ability to carry multiple Personas. SEES is able to disperse it, thus breaking the time loop, although they suspect it will eventually reappear as humans continue to wish for death. Erebus reappears in Persona 4 Arena in Elizabeth's story mode, during which she destroys it, though estimates it will re-form within a year's time.

== Other characters ==
=== Igor ===
Voiced by:

English: Dan Woren, Kirk Thornton (Reload)
Japanese: Isamu Tanonaka, Bin Shimada (Reload)

Igor (イゴール, Igōru) is the long-nosed man who presides over the Velvet Room and aides the player in Persona fusion. He appears in a similar capacity in every Persona game. Early on in Persona 3, he encourages the protagonist to form Social Links, saying they will determine his potential in combat. Near the conclusion of the game, when SEES is unable to stop Nyx's descent to Earth, Igor aids the protagonist in unveiling the power of the "Universe", using the power of the Social Links he has formed. The protagonist uses this newfound power to seal away Nyx. Despite the death of Isamu Tanonaka due to myocardial infarction in 2010, the animated movie adaptation in 2013 still uses his original voices recorded in the game. Igor appears in the anime series Persona: Trinity Soul as a fortune-teller, and interacts with the series' protagonist Shin Kanzato.

=== Elizabeth ===
Voiced by:

English: Tara Platt
Japanese: Miyuki Sawashiro

Elizabeth (エリザベス, Erizabesu) is an elevator girl who works as Igor's assistant. She maintains the Persona Compendium, from which the player may retrieve previously owned Personas for a price, and gives the player special requests in exchange for special rewards. These requests include tasks such as retrieving specific items or creating Personas with specific abilities. In Persona 3 FES and Persona 3 Portable, requests were added which allow the player to accompany Elizabeth outside of the Velvet Room. In Persona 4, Elizabeth has left the Velvet Room, her role being filled by her sister, Margaret. She left to find a way to rescue the protagonist of Persona 3 from his fate as the seal between Nyx and humanity. Elizabeth is portrayed by Asami Yoshikawa in the Persona 4 Arena and Persona 4 Ultimax Song Project stage plays and Riyu Kosaka in Persona 3: The Weird Masquerade.

Elizabeth returns in Persona 4 Arena as a playable character, where she is accompanied by the Persona Thanatos (タナトス, Tanatosu) and wielding a book as her weapon. Her nickname in the game is "The Lethal Elevator Attendant" (最凶のエレベーターガール, Saikyō no Erebētā Gāru). Elizabeth's story mode ends with her gaining insight on the nature of the Wild Card from Yu Narukami and Aigis, and she gains her own Fool arcana, signifying the start of a journey.

=== Theodore ===
Voiced by:

English: Travis Willingham, Bryce Papenbrook (Persona Q: Shadow of the Labyrinth onwards)
Japanese: Junichi Suwabe

Theodore (テオドア, Teodoa) is Igor's male assistant, and the younger brother of Elizabeth and Margaret. He was introduced as a character in Persona 3 Portable, and can take Elizabeth's place as Igor's assistant if the player controls the female protagonist.

Like Elizabeth in the male protagonist's route, he maintains the Persona Compendium, from which the player may retrieve previously owned Personas for a price, and gives the player special requests in exchange for special rewards. These requests include tasks such as retrieving specific items or creating Personas with specific abilities.

He is later mentioned in Persona 4 Arena by Elizabeth, and appears in a non-playable capacity in Persona 4 Arena Ultimax and Persona Q: Shadow of the Labyrinth. Theodore is portrayed by Ire Shiozaki in Persona 3: The Weird Masquerade.

=== Margaret ===
Margaret also appears in Persona 3 Portable as the person-in-charge of the Vision Quest Chamber, which simulates special battles based on their memories with rewards. The party may challenge her upon completions of all the battles.

=== Ryoji Mochizuki ===
Voiced by:

English: Yuri Lowenthal, Aleks Le (Reload)
Japanese: Akira Ishida

Ryoji Mochizuki (望月 綾時, Mochizuki Ryōji) is a recent transfer to Gekkoukan High School. He becomes known for his tendency to ask every girl he sees at school on a date. Upon meeting him, Aigis says he is dangerous, and warns the protagonist to be cautious around him. Ryoji and Aigis eventually meet on the Moonlight Bridge during the Dark Hour. It is here Ryoji regains memory of his past, realizing he is actually a human manifestation of Death, or The Appriser. Ten years prior to the events of Persona 3, the two fought on the same bridge, and Aigis, unable to defeat Death, sealed it inside the protagonist, who was a child at the time. Ryoji informs SEES that his purpose is to summon Nyx to Earth, who will bring about the end of the world. He asserts that Nyx is impossible to defeat; however, he offers SEES an alternative. If they were to kill him, their memories of the Dark Hour would vanish, allowing them to continue living unaware of their impending death. The player is given the choice to either kill Ryoji or spare him; if the latter is chosen, SEES fights Ryoji, who has transformed into Nyx Avatar, on the roof of Tartarus. Ryoji is portrayed by Keisuke Ueda in Persona 3: The Weird Masquerade.

He is the Social Link of the Fortune Arcana (運命, Unmei) in Persona 3 Portable, representing fate and opportunities provided by it, when the player controls the female protagionst. Knowing his fate of being the human manifestation of Death, he develops his sense of humanity, especially with the feelings to the female protagonist.

=== Natsuki Moriyama ===
Voiced by:

English: Kayli Mills (Reload)
Japanese: Yuka Komatsu (original game), Atsumi Tanezaki (Persona 3 The Movie, Reload)

Natsuki Moriyama (森山 夏紀, Moriyama Natsuki) is Fuuka's closest friend, and emotional support throughout the game. A Ganguro, she has an extremely tanned complexion, and orange-ish hair, similar in the style of most ganguro, or gyaru. She's shown to have a rather sadistic side, and has a knack for anyalzing people, and knowing exactly what to say to make them feel worthless. Fuuka, at first, was her target, because of Natsuki's own insecurities. One day, she and her clique, unaware that the school transforms into Tartarus during the Dark Hour, locked Fuuka in the school gym, resulting in Fuuka going missing. She was drawn in by Fuuka's calls for help, and went into Tartarus. Fuuka saved her from a Shadow by summoning her Persona, which encased them in a protective shell inside of her. After the ordeal, Natsuki lost her memory of the event, but apologized to Fuuka. The two quickly became best friends, and Natsuki's attitude proved a positive influence on Fuuka, making her a more confident girl. Natsuki's father became ill, and her family didn't have enough money, so they were forced to move. Natsuki then revealed that she and Fuuka were more similar than they thought, because Natsuki's parents both didn't pay much attention to her, claiming that they acted like she didn't even exist. She provided Fuuka with the resolve to earn her ascendant Persona, sending a text message to Fuuka saying that "No matter how far apart we may be, we will always be connected", which gave Fuuka her resolve. She also provided Fuuka another set of advice, claiming that "If they don't accept you for who you are, then screw 'em." Throughout the game, Natsuki is the closest person to Fuuka, despite their differences. Natsuki also claimed that "I like you, even if you don't like yourself."

=== Zen and Rei ===
Voiced by:

English: Keith Silverstein (Zen), Ashly Burch (Rei)
Japanese: Yuki Kaji (Zen), Kaori Nazuka (Rei)

Zen and Rei are amnesiacs encountered in Persona Q: Shadow of the Labyrinth: they are residents of a mysterious haven in the rift which takes the shape of Yasogami High (part of the setting for Persona 4), and due to story events do not appear in any other Persona title involving the members of SEES or the Investigation Team. Zen is a taciturn young man who is unfamiliar with people's habits and has a tendency to take things too literally, but is otherwise devoted to Rei's well-being, while Rei is a cheerful and innocent girl who has a strange metabolism that causes her to be forever hungry. Depending on which protagonist was chosen at the start, either SEES or the Investigation Team will encounter them first. If the Persona 3 protagonist is chosen, then Fuuka locates the first labyrinth somewhere near where the team is gathered by picking up on Shadow signals. However, before they can enter, Zen and Rei appear and interrupt them. Since they intend to enter a maze which doubles as a Shadows' nest, the protagonist allows them to join SEES for the time being. When they meet the Investigation Team, SEES decides to attempt to restore Zen and Rei's memories as this is their only lead to a way out of the haven in the rift. Zen is later revealed to be a part of Chronos, a being presiding over death, who was sent to take a young girl named Niko who had died of illness to "where all life returns". At this stage, Rei is abducted and the school's clock tower undergoes a Tartarus-esque transformation, and although Zen at first decides to save her on his own, SEES and the Investigation Team resolve to stay and help him out.

Zen uses a crossbow in battle. With this, he can shoot various objects at enemies, such as arrows or bullets. Unlike the other members of SEES, neither he nor Rei possess or are able to use Personas: however, they are capable of fighting Shadows by using an array of battle abilities unique to them. When Rei is kidnapped, Zen starts using the abilities she was using until then.

=== Hikari ===
Voiced by: Misato Fukuen

Hikari (ひかり) is a character introduced in Persona Q2: New Cinema Labyrinth. She is a teenage girl that one day woke up in the movie theater, she is the last person to enter the cinema. At first, she is very shy and quiet, and will have difficulties speaking to anyone that isn't Nagi, another resident of the theater. Her shyness is due to the trauma and depression of her bad past: she was often bullied and made fun of by others for being different, although due to psychogenic amnesia she can't properly remember her past during the game. Unable to cope with the pain of living, she ended up in the Cinema in the collective unconsciousness during a dream, there she meets Nagi, who promises Hikari to protect her from any harm by isolating her from reality. As our heroes change the endings of the movies, Hikari slowly starts to open up and begins communicating with them, and later in the game. After finishing the third labyrinth, Hikari follows Doe to one of the movies, titled ???, where she faces all of her past traumas, causing her to fully remember her memories and forcing her into a change of heart, revealing the title of the movie being named after her, "Hikari". After facing her past memories with courage and accepting them, Hikari successfully rehabilitates from her depression and acts as a combat support. After the ending of the game, Hikari wakes up from her dream, and is now able of speaking to her father again, confessing her desire to continue the production of the movie that she was creating before she fell into depression.

=== Nagi ===
Voiced by: Kikuko Inoue

Nagi (ナギ) is a character introduced in Persona Q2: New Cinema Labyrinth. Curator of the Cinema, Nagi is a woman that protects Hikari from all harm by keeping her in the Cinema, and Hikari thinks she is the only person who can trust due to her kind and caring personality. She congratulates our heroes every time they clear a labyrinth, even claiming that she doesn't have a choice. However, near the end of the game, she drops off her guise and reveals herself as Enlil, an administrator of the collective unconsciousness with a delusional and patronizing view towards humanity, believing that they are weak willed and the only way to give them salvation is to trap them inside her cinema domain, putting an end to their thoughts and isolating them from the hardships of life, at the cost of their freedom and increasing their depression even further. After our heroes defeat her, she returns into the form of the black-haired Nagi and vanishes into light, finally acknowledging the possibilities and strengths of humanity, but not before leaving a warning that she will return as long as people wish for her to, finally allowing the party to leave the Cinema.

=== Doe ===
Voiced by: Kazuhiko Inoue

Doe (ドー) is a character introduced in Persona Q2: New Cinema Labyrinth. He is a weird shadow-like figure that is mostly quiet, that one day appeared in the theater, acting as a weird projectionist that would play the same movies over and over again. He would generate a key able to unlock the Cinema exit every time a labyrinth was completed. Hikari is very afraid of him, and has a lot of trouble communicating or getting near with him, although she starts to become less fearful as the game progresses. After Hikari consensually followed Doe, leading her to ???, she decides to face her own past and so that she can recollect her memories lost from her amnesia. Our heroes, thinking that Doe kidnapped Hikari, they fight him in the deepest part of the labyrinth, after he goes berserk due to Hikari rejecting him. After they defeat him the truth is revealed: Doe is nothing more than a cognition of Hikari's father, created by her due to her depression and low self-esteem, starting to make her develop an inability to differ what is actually harmful to her and what actually isn't. This causes her to develop paranoia towards her father's supposed goodwill that results in the creation of Doe, whom she perceives as a terrifying figure that she could not even get close to. Realizing this, Hikari steps forward and hugs him, as he turns into an image of her father. She tearfully confesses all of her negative thoughts to him, and after the confession, he turns into one of the keys and fades into light.

=== Minor characters ===
==== Kurosawa ====
Voiced by:

English: Grant George (all games except Reload), Liam O'Brien (Reload)
Japanese: Hirofumi Tanaka

Officer Kurosawa (黒沢巡査, Kurosawa Junsa; lit. Policeman Kurosawa) is a police officer found at a station in Paulownia Mall. Although he is not conscious during the Dark Hour, he aids in the efforts of SEES by selling weapons and armor.

He also makes an appearance in Persona 4 Arena, having been promoted to Detective and working under Mitsuru. He is seen in Inaba at her request.

==== Takeharu Kirijo ====
Voiced by:

English: Derek Stephen Prince (all games except Reload), Grant George (Reload)
Japanese: Kōji Totani (original game), Yasunori Masutani (FES, Portable, Persona 3 The Movie, Reload)

Takeharu Kirijo (桐条 武治, Kirijō Takeharu) is Mitsuru's father and the president of the Kirijo Group. He is the son of Kouetsu Kirijo, the corporation's former president, who began a series of experiments on Shadows seeking to harness their power. He rejects the ideology of his father, who believed death was a form of deliverance. Shuji Ikutsuki murders Takeharu on the roof of Tartarus, saying he did not understand his father's vision.

==== Eiichiro Takeba ====
Voiced by:

English: Liam O'Brien (all games except Reload), Yuri Lowenthal (Reload)
Japanese:Masashi Hamano (original game), Kanehira Yamamoto (Persona 3 The Movie, Reload)

Eiichiro Takeba (岳羽 詠一郎, Takeba Eiichirō) is Yukari's deceased father and one of the scientists who was a part of the Shadow experiments carried out in 1999. The corporation blamed the incident on him, although he was attempting to stop the Kirijo Group's work. He recorded a video for his daughter prior to his death, which Shuji Ikutsuki altered in order to manipulate SEES.

==== Persona 4 characters ====
With Persona 3 Portable, Atlus inserted cameo appearances by two characters from Persona 4. A younger version of Yukiko Amagi, a playable character in Persona 4, makes an appearance in Persona 3 Portable. She is seen when the player's character visits Inaba, the setting of Persona 4, in a new event added in Persona 3 Portable. Noriko Kashiwagi, the player's (second) homeroom teacher in Persona 4, also makes an appearance during Junpei's "Operation Babe Hunt", making a pass for Akihiko. The same cameo appearance also happened in the movie adaptation.

== Social Links ==
=== Kenji Tomochika ===
Voiced by:

English: Joe Zieja (Reload)
Japanese: Kenji Nojima (drama CDs, Persona 3 The Movie), Wataru Hatano (Reload)

Kenji Tomochika (友近 健二, Tomochika Kenji) is a classmate of the protagonist; he is attracted to older women and is attempting to ask out his ethics teacher.

He is the Social Link for the Magician Arcana (魔術師, Majutsushi), representing action, initiative, and immaturity. However, if playing the female path in Persona 3 Portable, Junpei Iori replaces Kenji as the Magician Social Link. He still appears as part of Rio's Social Link.

=== Kazushi Miyamoto ===
Voiced by:

English: Mark Whitten (Reload)
Japanese: Atsushi Kisaichi (drama CDs, Persona 3 The Movie), Eiji Miyashita (Reload)

Kazushi Miyamoto (宮本 一志, Miyamoto Kazushi) is a student athlete and member of the protagonist's sports team; he is developing problems in his knee, which he asks the player's character to keep a secret from their teammates.

He is the Social Link for the Chariot Arcana (戦車, Sensha), which symbolizes momentary victory. However, if playing the female path in Persona 3 Portable, Rio Iwasaki replaces Kazushi as the Chariot Social Link.

=== Keisuke Hiraga ===
Voiced by:

English: Griffin Burns (Reload)
Japanese: Shinnosuke Tachibana (drama CDs), Yuichi Iguchi (Reload)

Keisuke Hiraga (平賀 慶介, Hiraga Keisuke) is a member whichever cultural club the player joins. He is a talented artist, but he is pressured by his father, who is a doctor, to inherit his family's hospital.

He is the Social Link for the Fortune Arcana (運命, Unmei) in Persona 3 Portable, representing fate and opportunities provided by it. However, if playing the female path in Persona 3 Portable, Ryoji Mochizuki replaces him as the Social Link of Fortune Arcana.

=== Hidetoshi Odagiri ===
Voiced by:

English: Austin Lee Matthews (Reload)
Japanese: Hiroaki Miura (drama CDs, Persona 3 The Movie), Masaya Matsukaze (Reload)

Hidetoshi Odagiri (小田桐 秀利, Odagiri Hidetoshi) is the vice president of the student council; he is unpopular among the student body due to his strict enforcement of rules.

He is the Social Link for the Emperor Arcana (皇帝, Kōtei), representing leadership and decision-making.

=== Yuko Nishiwaki ===
Voiced by:

English: Shelby Young (Reload)
Japanese: Satomi Satō (drama CDs, Persona 3 The Movie), Emiri Kato (Reload)

Yuko Nishiwaki (西脇結子, Nishiwaki Yūko) is the student manager of the protagonist's sports team. She fears that she is too much of a tomboy to ever been seen by someone in a romantic light. In Persona 3 Portable, if the player controls the female protagonist, she will have feelings for Kazushi Miyamoto.

She is the Social Link for the Strength Arcana (剛毅, Gōki), representing passion, self-control, and power with reason. However, if playing the female path in Persona 3 Portable, Koromaru replaces Yuko as the Strength Social Link.

=== Chihiro Fushimi ===
Voiced by:

English: Wendee Lee (Persona 4), Cassandra Lee Morris (Persona 4 the Animation), Kelly Baskin (Reload)
Japanese: Ai Maeda (drama CDs, Persona 3 The Movie, Persona 4, Persona 4 the Animation), Aya Endo (Reload)

Chihiro Fushimi (伏見 千尋, Fushimi Chihiro) is the student council treasurer; she initially has a phobia of men, which she is able to overcome with the help of the protagonist. In Persona 4, set two years after the events of Persona 3, Chihiro is now the Student Council President.

She is the Social Link for Justice Arcana (正義, Seigi), representing the knowledge of what is right and wrong. However, if controlling the female protagonist in Persona 3 Portable, Ken Amada replaces Chihiro as the Justice Social Link.

=== Andre "Bebe" Laurent Jean Geraux ===
Voiced by:

English: Jeff Berg (Reload)
Japanese: Hisayoshi Suganuma (drama CDs), Mitsuhiro Ichiki (Reload)

Andre Laurent Jean Geraux (アンドレ･ローラン･ジャン･ジェラール, Andore Rōran Jan Jerāru), or Bebe (ベベ) for short, is a French exchange student engrossed with Japanese culture. He is part of the sewing club, and his dream is to live in Japan while making one of the best kimonos ever. In midpoint of his Social Link, Bebe receives news that his aunt in France died, and is being ordered to return home. He decides to make a sophisticated kimono and show it to his uncle to try to convince him to let Bebe stay in Japan. At the near end of the game, the protagonist receives a letter from Bebe saying that his uncle was convinced to let him stay, but decides not to as he realizes that he is not very knowledgeable of Japan just yet.

He is the Social Link for the Temperance Arcana (節制, Sessei), representing the balancing opposites and allowing the individual to grow.

=== Nozomi Suemitsu ===
Voiced by:

English: Paul Castro Jr. (Reload)
Japanese: Fukushi Ochiai (Reload)

Nozomi Suemitsu (末光 望美, Suemitsu Nozomi) is the self-proclaimed "Gourmet King"; he has an inferiority complex with his younger brother, who was intellectually and athletically superior to him.

He is the Social Link for the Moon Arcana (月, Tsuki), representing a source of fear and false illusions. However, if playing the female path in Persona 3 Portable, Shinjiro Aragaki replaces Nozomi as the Moon Social Link.

=== Mitsuko and Bunkichi ===
Voiced by:

English: Susanne Blakeslee (Mitsuko, Reload), Andre Sogliuzzo (Bunkichi, Reload)
Japanese: Fumi Oda (Mitsuko, drama CDs), Sanae Takagi (Mitsuko, Reload), Kōji Yada (Bunkichi, drama CDs), Naoki Tatsuta (Bunkichi, Reload)

Mitsuko (光子婆さん, Mitsuko Baasan) and Bunkichi (文吉爺さん, Bunkichi Jiisan) are an old couple who run a used bookstore. They are dealing with the death of their son, a former teacher at Gekkokan, and want to stop the school from cutting down the tree planted in his memory.

They are the Social Link for the Hierophant Arcana (法王, Hōō), representing formality and knowledge.

=== Maya ===
Voiced by: Yuka Komatsu

Maya (Y-Ko (Y子, Waiko) in Japan) is a player in the fictional MMORPG Innocent Sin Online; at the conclusion of her Social Link's story, she professes her love to the protagonist in the game. The player later discovers that Maya is actually the protagonist's homeroom teacher Isako Toriumi (鳥海 いさ子, Toriumi Isako).

Maya is the Social Link for the Hermit Arcana (隠者, Insha), representing the search for answers by looking to one's self. However, if playing the female path in Persona 3 Portable, Saori Hasegawa replaces Maya as the Hermit Social Link.

Maya's name and both Innocent Sin Online are both references to Persona 2: Innocent Sin. Maya's Japanese name, "Y-ko", and the MMO being called "Devil Busters Online" is a reference to a character in the very first Megami Tensei game.

=== Maiko Oohashi ===
Voiced by:

English: Grace Lu (Reload)
Japanese: Fumiko Orikasa (drama CD, Persona 3 The Movie), Hiyori Kono (Reload)

Oohashi Maiko (舞子) is a little girl distressed over her parents' pending divorce; she runs away from home in an attempt to bring her parents back together.

She is the Social Link for the Hanged Man Arcana (刑死者, Keishisha), representing the inability to take action.

=== Pharos ===
Voiced by:

English: Aleks Le (Reload)
Japanese: Akira Ishida

Pharos (ファルロス, Farurosu; Fallos in the Japanese version) is a mysterious boy the player first encounters during the opening of Persona 3. Throughout the game, he occasionally appears in the protagonist's bedroom at night to talk to him, and remind him of an upcoming full moon. He represents the Social Link for the Death Arcana (死神, Shinigami), representing the end of the old and the beginning of the new, which advances automatically as the story progresses. Initially, his memory is fragmented, but by the end of the Link, he clearly remembers who he is and what his purpose is. Pharos and the protagonist last talk in November, during the day rather than the Dark Hour. He says goodbye to the protagonist, who later learns that he and Ryoji Mochizuki, a student at Gekkoukan High School, are the same person. Pharos is portrayed by Keisuke Ueda in Persona 3: The Weird Masquerade.

=== Tanaka ===
Voiced by:

English: Patrick Seitz (Reload)
Japanese: Bin Shimada

President Tanaka (たなか社長, Tanaka Shachō) is a businessman who sells products on television. He takes the protagonist under his wing to teach him about the business industry.

In Persona 4, Tanaka has become a very successful businessman, selling his items Sundays on a local network.

In Persona 5, Tanaka seemed to have fallen somewhat, selling items over a virtual black market accessible by repairing a broken laptop.

He is the Social Link for the Devil Arcana (悪魔, Akuma), representing temptation.

=== Mutatsu ===
Voiced by:

English: Aaron LaPlante (Reload)
Japanese: Masaharu Satō (drama CDs), Shin Aomori (Reload)

Mutatsu (無達) is a monk who regularly drinks at a local club. He abandoned his family to become a monk, and is afraid of facing them. With the help of the protagonist, Mutatsu gains the courage to face his family and ask for forgiveness.

He is the Social Link for the Tower Arcana (塔, Tō), representing the threat of collapse and loss of all hope.

=== Mamoru Hayase ===
Voiced by:

English: Yong Yea (Reload)
Japanese: Yuichiro Umehara (Reload)

Mamoru Hayase (早瀬 護, Hayase Mamoru) is a student athlete the protagonist meets at a sports match. Originally his rival, Mamoru reveals much about his personal life and how he has to financially support his family. The protagonist encourages him not to give up and continue to strive for being the best he can.

He is the Social Link for the Star Arcana (星, Hoshi), representing a glimmer of hope. If the female protagonist is chosen in Persona 3 Portable, Akihiko Sanada replaces Mamoru as the Star Social Link.

=== Akinari Kamiki ===
Voiced by:

English: Lucien Dodge (Reload)
Japanese: Hirofumi Nojima (Reload)

Akinari Kamiki (神木 秋成, Kamiki Akinari) is a dying young man who writes to ease his mind. Through the protagonist' interaction with Akinari, he helps him in understanding his purpose in life and helps him to overcome his grief of his disease. Upon maximizing the Social Link, Akinari gives the protagonist his finished book to be published—and disappears before his startled eyes.

Akinari is the Social Link for the Sun Arcana (太陽, Taiyō), representing a bright future and a true achievement, and is only encountered during Maiko's Social Link.

=== Rio Iwasaki ===
Voiced by: Saori Hayami (drama CD)

Rio Iwasaki (岩崎 理緒) is a student of Gekkoukan High School. The female protagonist can become friends with her by joining either the tennis club or volleyball club. She is childhood friends with Kenji Tomochika and is friends with Yuko. She secretly has a crush on Kenji. She briefly appears in the Persona: 3 The Movie.

If playing the female route she replaces Kazushi. Rio Iwasaki is the Social Link for the Chariot Arcana (戦車, Sensha).

=== Saori Hasegawa ===
Hasegawa Saori (長谷川 沙織) is a student of Gekkoukan High School. She can become friends with the female protagonist by joining the Library committee or Health committee. She needs encouragement to stand for herself by the female protagonist. She briefly appears in the Persona: 3 The Movie.

If playing the female route, she replaces Ms. Toriumi as the Hermit Arcana (隠者, Insha).

== Reception ==
The cast of Persona 3 was well received by critics. Damian Thomas of RPGFan wrote in his review of Persona 3 that he was able to connect with the game's cast "in a way that I can't in most RPGs. Some of the relationships are humorous, some are heartbreaking, and some are downright goofy." He also wrote that, because the game takes place over the course of a school year, the player is able to see the characters "grow and develop as you interact [with them]." Heidi Kemps of GamesRadar said that Persona 3 contained "a memorable cast of characters", although listed "Fuuka's inability to shut up" as a negative point at the conclusion of the review. In his review for Eurogamer, Rob Fahey wrote that developer Atlus made a "wise decision" in choosing to represent characters in the world in 3D, while using "lovely 2D artwork to convey expressions and emotions." Patrick Joynt of GameSpy found the Social Link stories of Persona 3 to be "universally fascinating", adding, "We were honestly worried about our friend from Kendo pushing his knee too hard; our friend's relationship with a teacher was sad to watch; and the tragedy of the old couple who owns the local bookstore will move anyone with an ounce of decency."
