= Yasunori Masutani =

Japanese voice actor

- 増谷 康紀
- Born: July 5, 1961 (age 65); Sapporo, Hokkaidō, Japan
- Occupation: Voice actor
- Years active: 1990–present
- Agent: Aoni Production

Yasunori Masutani (増谷 康紀, Masutani Yasunori; born July 5, 1961) is a Japanese voice actor.

== Filmography ==
=== Anime ===
- Armitage III (Ross Sylibus)
- Asobi Asobase (Sainan-sensei)
- Atelier Escha & Logy: Alchemists of the Dusk Sky (Reyfer Luckberry)
- Bakugan Battle Brawlers: Gundalian Invaders (Aranaut)
- Classroom of the Elite (Professor Ayanokoji)
- Digimon Adventure (Etemon, MetalEtemon)
- Digimon Frontier (Mercurymon, Sakkakumon)
- Dragon Ball Super (Universal Anthem Singer, Universe 6 Kaiōshin, Rou)
- Fujimi Orchestra (Tonoin Kei)
- Inu x Boku SS (Yujiro Kouda)
- Ultimate Muscle (Gazelleman)
- Zatch Bell! (Noritohassami)
- KonoSuba: An Explosion on This Wonderful World! (Zesta)
- Marvel Disk Wars: The Avengers (Giant-Man / Hank Pym, Doctor Strange)
- Marvel Future Avengers (Doctor Strange)
- One Piece (Shepherd Ju Peter, Mr. Disco, Jean Bart, Attach, Billy, Drug Peclo, Yorki, Potaufeu, Yokan, Jalmack, Andre, Yatappe, Gazelleman, Yamakaji, McGuy, Yukimura, Ed, Hanji, Gorobe, Jeep, Geronimo, Milo, Waruno Furishiro, Kojuro, Jaki)
- Persona 3 The Movie: No. 2, Midsummer Knight's Dream (Takeharu Kirijo)
- Persona 3 The Movie: No. 3, Falling Down (Takeharu Kirijo)
- Psycho-Pass (Choe Gu-sung)
- Silver Spoon (Nakajima)
- Tougen Anki (Samidare Momoya)
- Transformers: Energon (Mega Zarak)
- World Trigger (Raymond)

=== Video games ===
- Ace Combat 5: The Unsung War (Allen C. Hamilton)
- Airforce Delta Strike (Harry Garrett, Bob Takayanagi, Giuseppe Ferretti)
- Atelier Escha & Logy: Alchemists of the Dusk Sky (Reyfer Luckberry)
- Castlevania: Curse of Darkness (Trevor Belmont)
- Cookie Run: Kingdom (Dark Cacao Cookie)
- Crimson Tears (Eiichiro Kai)
- Death by Degrees (Tekken Force Soldiers)
- Dragon Ball Xenoverse (Nuova Shenron)
- Dragon Ball Xenoverse 2 (Nuova Shenron)
- DreamMix TV World Fighters (Moai)
- Dynasty Warriors (Guan Yu)
- Dynasty Warriors 2 (Guan Yu)
- Dynasty Warriors 3 (Guan Yu, Wei Yan)
- Dynasty Warriors 4 (Guan Yu, Wei Yan)
- Dynasty Warriors 5 (Guan Yu, Wei Yan)
- Dynasty Warriors 6 (Guan Yu, Wei Yan)
- Dynasty Warriors 7 (Guan Yu, Wei Yan)
- Dynasty Warriors 8 (Guan Yu, Wei Yan)
- Dynasty Warriors 9 (Guan Yu, Wei Yan)
- Genshin Impact (Oz)
- Granblue Fantasy (Deo Ortoreg)
- Guilty Gear X (That Man)
- Guilty Gear XX (That Man)
- JoJo's Bizarre Adventure: Eyes of Heaven (Whitesnake/C-Moon)
- Lunar: Silver Star Story Complete (Tempest)
- Mega Man X: Command Mission (Scarface, Wild Jango)
- Melty Blood (TATARI/The Night of Walachia)
- Ninja Assault (Kagenin in the Arcade Version)
- Onimusha: Dawn of Dreams (Fortinbras)
- Persona 3 (Takeharu Kirijo)
- Persona 3 FES (Takeharu Kirijo)
- Persona 3 Portable (Takeharu Kirijo)
- Persona 3 Reload (Takeharu Kirijo)
- Silhouette Mirage (Megido Birthclod)
- Soulcalibur
  - Soulcalibur II (Raphael Sorel)
  - Soulcalibur III (Raphael Sorel)
  - Soulcalibur IV (Raphael Sorel)
  - Soulcalibur: Broken Destiny (Raphael Sorel)
  - Soulcalibur V (Raphael Sorel, Nightmare)
  - Soulcalibur VI (Raphael Sorel)
- WinBack (Kenneth Coleman)

=== Tokusatsu ===
- Duke Org DoroDoro (ep. 42 - 43) in Hyakujuu Sentai Gaoranger
- Ultraman Nexus in Ultraman Nexus
- Cosmic Kenpo Master Pachacamac XII in Juuken Sentai Gekiranger vs. Boukenger
- Kamen Rider Scissors (ep. 6) in Kamen Rider Decade
- Cosmic Kenpo Master Pachacamac XIII (ep. 7) in Kaizoku Sentai Gokaiger
- Trumpas (ep. 17 - 18) in Doubutsu Sentai Zyuohger

=== Drama CDs ===
- Fujimi Orchestra Series 1: Kanreizensen Conductor (Kei Tounoin)
- Fujimi Orchestra Series 2: D-Senjou no Aria (Kei Tounoin)
- Fujimi Orchestra Series 3: Samayoeru Violinist (Kei Tounoin)
- Fujimi Orchestra Series 4: Concert wa Osuki? (Kei Tounoin)
- Fujimi Orchestra Series 5: Akaikutsu Waltz (Kei Tounoin)
- Fujimi Orchestra Series 6: Manhattan Sonata (Kei Tounoin)
- Fujimi Orchestra Series 7: Recital Rhapsody (Kei Tounoin)
- Fujimi Orchestra Series 8: Tounoin Hakaku Katariki (Kei Tounoin)
- Fujimi Orchestra Series side story: Yasei no Amadeus (Kei Tounoin)
- Fujimi Orchestra Series testimony: Majime Kon Masu wa Conductor no Yume wo Miruka? (Kei Tounoin)
- Gin no Requiem (Jenas)
- Happy Time (Okajima)
- Katsuai series 1 (Kazuya Takami)
- Katsuai series 2: Bakuren (Kazuya Takami)
- Kizu (Kouji Kirihara)
- Koikina Yatsura 1 - 3 & side story (Satoru Date)
- Love Song ~Hanbun Tenshi~ (Norito Sakuragawa)
- Onii-san wa Seitokaichou (Yuuichi Amanuma)
- Saikyou no Koibito (Akitoshi Kariya)

=== Dubbing roles ===
==== Live-action ====
- Dynasty Warriors (Guan Yu (Han Geng))
- Power Rangers Mystic Force (Koragg, The Knight Wolf (Geoff Dolan))
- Spy Kids (Mr. Lisp (Robert Patrick))
- Sugar Hill (Romello Skuggs (Wesley Snipes))

==== Animation ====
- Thomas & Friends (Express Coaches, Troublesome Trucks, Blue Narrow Gauge Coaches and The Dryaw Policeman (Seasons 1 and 4))
- Cloudy with a Chance of Meatballs 2 (Narrator)
- Transformers: Prime (Knock Out) (Japanese:Medic Knock Out)
