= Persona 3 The Movie: No. 4, Winter of Rebirth =

2016 animated film

Persona 3 The Movie: #4 Winter of Rebirth
- Theatrical release poster
- Directed by: Tomohisa Taguchi
- Written by: Jun Kumagai
- Story by: Atlus
- Based on: Persona 3 by Atlus
- Starring: Akira Ishida; Megumi Toyoguchi; Kōsuke Toriumi; Rie Tanaka; Hikaru Midorikawa; Mamiko Noto; Maaya Sakamoto; Megumi Ogata; Kazuya Nakai; Isamu Tanonaka; Miyuki Sawashiro
- Edited by: Takashi Sakurai
- Music by: Tetsuya Kobayashi
- Production company: A-1 Pictures
- Distributed by: Aniplex
- Release date: January 23, 2016
- Running time: 105 minutes
- Country: Japan
- Language: Japanese
- Box office: US$361,950 (Japan)

Persona 3 The Movie: #4 Winter of Rebirth (劇場版「ペルソナ3」第4章, Gekijōban Perusona 3 Dai Yon Shō) is a 2016 Japanese animated film and the fourth and final installment in a film series based on the Persona 3 video game by Atlus. It is based on the original story by Atlus and distributed by Aniplex. The film is directed by Tomohisa Taguchi and written by Jun Kumagai. It stars voice actors Akira Ishida, Megumi Toyoguchi, Kōsuke Toriumi, Rie Tanaka, Hikaru Midorikawa, Mamiko Noto, Maaya Sakamoto, Megumi Ogata and Kazuya Nakai.

== Plot ==
Ten years ago, Makoto survived a car crash that killed his parents. In the aftermath, he watched the battle between Aigis and Ryoji, who back then was a Shadow known as Death. Unable to defeat Death, Aigis sealed Death within Makoto, who then lost the memories of the incident. In the present day, Makoto remembers the incident as the rest of SEES members arrive. Upon finding out Ryoji's true identity, they attack him, but are easily defeated. Before leaving, Ryoji reveals that a being known as Nyx will come and bring the end of the world. Ryoji gives them one month to decide whether to kill him, which will erase their memories and allow them to live the remainder of their lives in blissful ignorance, or spare him and attempt a fruitless battle against Nyx.

The revelation drives everyone into depression. The SEES members discuss Ikutsuki's files on Nyx and the choice that Ryoji has given to them, but the team's fears quickly drive them apart. On December 20, Aigis regains her consciousness after her battle against Ryoji and apologizes to Makoto for what happened ten years ago. Not wanting to see her friends suffer, Aigis begs Makoto to kill Ryoji. Mitsuru and Akihiko visit a church and find Takaya and Jin spreading the knowledge of Nyx's arrival. On December 22, Yukari's neglect for eating causes her to hallucinate her Persona attacking her, and she is hospitalized.

Makoto is approached by Elizabeth, who asks him to give her a tour around the town. At their last destination, Elizabeth questions Makoto's experience in the town over the past year. As Makoto reminisces about his good times, he realizes that the time he spent with his friends has made him feel truly alive for the first time after the incident ten years ago, and he regains his resolve to live. At the same time, the other SEES members also regain their respective resolve to keep living not only for themselves but also for their loved ones. On the promised day, Ryoji comes to hear their answer, and Makoto refuses to kill him. Respecting his decision, Ryoji tells SEES that Nyx will appear at the top of Tartarus on January 31. Horrified by her friends' choice, Aigis runs away to Gekkoukan High. Makoto follows her and encourages her, giving her the resolve to fight Nyx. Realizing that they may lose their memories of their battles, Makoto and his friends make a promise to gather on the school rooftop on graduation day as a sign that they remember what they have gone through.

On the day of Nyx's arrival, SEES fights their way to the top of Tartarus, also encountering Takaya and Jin on the way. While SEES holds the line against their enemies, Makoto goes on ahead to confront Nyx alone. After a lengthy battle, SEES is able to defeat their enemies with their newly transformed Personas and reach Makoto. However, Makoto is unable to defeat Nyx, and the prophesied Fall begins. SEES is rendered immobile by Nyx's massive gravitational wave, and are cornered by a massive group of Shadows. Determined to go through with his decision, Makoto fuses Orpheus and Thanatos into Messiah and flies into the moon where Nyx's core is located. With powers and encouragement from his friends, Makoto seals Nyx away and eliminates both Tartarus and the Dark Hour.

A month after the battle against Nyx, Makoto and the others head to school to attend Mitsuru and Akihiko's graduation ceremony, having lost all memories of the Dark Hour after the battle. Makoto spots Aigis and regains his memories, stumbling to the roof, due to using too much power in the final battle, where Aigis is waiting to fulfill the group's promise; not long after, the rest of SEES regain their memories and also head to the roof. The movie ends with a smiling Makoto watching the rest of his friends arrive as he lays upon Aigis's lap with cherry blossoms fluttering about, having finally fulfilled their promise.

After the ending credits, Elizabeth is seen leaving the Velvet Room, where the elevator had stopped now that Makoto's contract has been fulfilled.

== Promotion ==
=== Previews ===
#4 Winter of Rebirth was first teased at the end of the Persona 3 The Movie: #3 Falling Down feature film which began screening in Japan from April 4, 2015.

=== Collaborations ===
After the release of Persona 3 The Movie: #4 Winter of Rebirth, a collaboration between Sony and the Persona series was done. A commercial was made, Persona 3 the Movie meets 'Walkman'. The collaboration continued with a display at Giza Sony and Shibuya Animate stores, and would take place from March 1 to March 12. It also contains a lottery, as contestants can take part by taking a photo of the display following the account P3Movie. Upload it using X and using the hashtag P3M_WM and SonyHi_ResACG to enter.

== Reception ==
As of January 24, 2016, the film had grossed US$361,950 in Japan.
