= Asami Tano =

Japanese actress

- 田野 アサミ
- Born: 12 February 1987 (age 39)
- Occupations: Actress; voice actress; singer
- Years active: 2002–present
- Agent: Amuse, Inc.
- Notable work: Smile PreCure! as Akane Hino/Cure Sunny; Love Live! Sunshine!! as Sarah Kazuno; Zombie Land Saga as Saki Nikaido
- Height: 162 cm (5 ft 4 in)
- Spouse: Ryo Kitamura (m. 2021)
- Children: 1

Asami Tano (田野 アサミ, Tano Asami; born 12 February 1987) is a Japanese actress from Amagasaki. She is affiliated with Amuse Inc. Tano was part of the girl group Boystyle from 2001 to 2007. Her voice acting career began with Toriko in 2011, and she has starred in several anime such as Smile PreCure!, Francesca, Love Live! Sunshine!!, and Zombie Land Saga. She has also appeared in the theatrical productions of Persona 3: The Weird Masquerade, Persona 4 Arena, Blue Exorcist, Kuroko's Basketball, and The Seven Deadly Sins.

== Biography ==
Asami Tano, a native of Amagasaki, was born on 12 February 1987. She was an originally a member of the idol group BOYSTYLE.

In 2011, her first anime role was in Toriko, voicing a character named Rin. In 2012, she voiced Akane Hino/Cure Sunny in Smile PreCure!, the ninth season of the Pretty Cure franchise;. In an interview two years later, Tano described it as the start of her voice acting career. In 2018, she reprised her Pretty Cure role alongside the other fifty-four Pretty Cures in the crossover film Hugtto! PreCure Futari wa Pretty Cure: All Stars Memories, which was certified as having the "Most Magical Warriors in an Anime Film" by Guinness World Records.

In January 2014, she starred as Mitsuru Kirijo in the stage musical Persona 3: The Weird Masquerade; she reprised the role in both the Persona 4 Arena stage play and Persona 4 Ultimax Song Project. On 3 April 2018, Tano was cast as Guila in the stage adaptation of The Seven Deadly Sins. On 28 July 2018, it was announced that Tano would cease performing at the stage production to recover from thyroid disease; the role of Guila was substituted by actress Haneyuri. She also played Mamushi Hojo in the stage adaptation of Blue Exorcist, Live Act Ao no Exorcist ~Mashin no Rakuin~, and Riko Aida in the stage adaptation of Kuroko's Basketball, Kuroko's Basketball The Encounter

In February 2014, she was cast as Exorcist in Francesca, an anime centered on the titular idol based in Hokkaido Prefecture, alongside the titular main character's voice actress Yui Makino. In April 2014, she was cast in Sega Hard Girls as Genesis. Her Sword Art Online II character Nori sang the song "Sleepless Legend" for the SAO II Song Collection, which was released on 22 March 2017. She voiced Sarah Kazuno in Love Live! Sunshine!!, who is part of the subunit duo Saint Snow alongside Leah Kazuno (voiced by Hinata Satō). She voices Aki Saotome in the third-person shooter video game Bullet Girls.

On 10 September 2018, Tano was cast as Saki Nikaido in Zombie Land Saga, an anime by Cygames and MAPPA. Tano was interviewed by Rolling Stone Japan alongside her co-stars Kaede Hondo, Minami Tanaka and Mamoru Miyano. She also appeared at the Zombie Land Saga panel at Crunchyroll Expo 2019. In her July 2019 interview with Anime! Anime! following the anime's collaboration with Grimoire A: Shiritsu Grimoire Mahou Gakuen, Tano mentioned that, during recording, she was given assistance to use the Saga dialect to reprise her character.

On 13 December 2021, she announced her marriage to actor Ryō Kitamura. On 12 December 2022, she announced the birth of her first child

== Filmography ==
=== Anime ===
Year	Title	Role	Source
2011	Toriko	Rin	
2012	Smile PreCure!	Akane Hino/Cure Sunny	
2012	Monsuno	Vicky/Jinja	
2012	Arata: The Legend	Honi	
2013	Silver Spoon	Toyonishi	
2013	Gaist Crusher	Kohaku Kongōji	
2014	The Pilot's Love Song	Chiharu de Lucia	
2014	Sword Art Online II	Nori	
2014	Francesca	Exorcist	
2014	Sega Hard Girls	Genesis	
2015	Durarara!!×2	Amphisbaena	
2015	The Testament of Sister New Devil Burst	Nanao Tachibana	
2016	Love Live! Sunshine!!	Sarah Kazuno	
2017	Schoolgirl Strikers: Animation Channel	Mari Yukishiro	
2018	Zombie Land Saga	Saki Nikaido	
2020	GeGeGe no Kitarō	Rikako	
2020	Seton Academy: Join the Pack!	Ferrill Ōkami	
2020	The God of High School	Commissioner P	
2021	Zombie Land Saga Revenge	Saki Nikaido	
2026	Uncle's Obsession with Cute Things	Carrie	

=== Film ===
Year	Title	Role	Source
2012	Pretty Cure All Stars New Stage: Friends of the Future	Akane Hino/Cure Sunny	
2012	Smile PreCure! the Movie: Big Mismatch in a Picture Book!	Akane Hino/Cure Sunny	
2013	Pretty Cure All Stars New Stage 2: Friends of the Heart	Akane Hino/Cure Sunny	
2013	Toriko the Movie: Bishokushin's Special Menu''	Rin	
2015	Pretty Cure All Stars: Spring Carnival♪	Akane Hino/Cure Sunny	
2016	Pretty Cure All Stars: Singing with Everyone♪ Miraculous Magic!	Akane Hino/Cure Sunny	
2018	Hugtto! PreCure Futari wa Pretty Cure: All Stars Memories	Akane Hino/Cure Sunny	
2019	Love Live! Sunshine!! The School Idol Movie: Over the Rainbow	Sarah Kazuno	
2020	Burn the Witch	Nini Spangle	
2025	Zombie Land Saga: Yumeginga Paradise	Saki Nikaido	

=== Theatre ===
Year	Title	Role	Source
2014	Persona 3: The Weird Masquerade	Mitsuru Kirijo	
2014	Persona 4: The Ultimate in Mayonaka Arena	Mitsuru Kirijo	
2015	Persona 4 Ultimax Song Project	Mitsuru Kirijo	
2016	Live Act Ao no Exorcist ~Mashin no Rakuin~	Mamushi Hojo	
2016	Kuroko's Basketball The Encounter	Riko Aida	

=== Video games ===
Year	Title	Role	Source
2011	Toriko: Gourmet Survival!	Rin	
2012	Toriko: Gourmet Survival! 2	Rin	
2012	Smile PreCure! Let's Go! Marchen World	Akane Hino/Cure Sunny	
2013	Gaist Crusher	Kohaku Kongōji	
2014	Schoolgirl Strikers	Mari Yukishiro	
2014	Gaist Crusher God	Kohaku Kongōji	
2014	Bullet Girls	Aki Saotome	
2016	Bullet Girls 2	Aki Saotome	
2021	Granblue Fantasy	Fediel	
2024	Genshin Impact	Citlali	

=== Dubbing ===
Year	Title	Role	Source
2014	Beauty and the Beast	Virgil	
2014	Broadchurch	Danny Latimer	
2015	Little Astro Boy	Ken	
2015	Star Wars Rebels	Sabine Wren	
2022	Red Election	Katrine Poulson	
