= Persona 3: The Weird Masquerade =

Stage musicals based on video game of the same name

- Promotional poster for Persona 3: The Weird Masquerade: Act 4 The Indigo Pledge
- Music: Shoji Meguro; Mako Kuwabara
- Lyrics: Shoji Meguro; Makoto Kimura
- Basis: Persona 3 by Atlus
- Premiere: January 8, 2014: Theater G Rosso, Tokyo, Japan
- Productions: 2014 Tokyo (Act I); 2014 Tokyo (Act II); 2015 Tokyo (Act III); 2017 Tokyo (Acts IV & V)

Persona 3: The Weird Masquerade (舞台『PERSONA3 the Weird Masquerade』) is a series of stage musicals produced by Clie based on the 2006 PlayStation 2 video game Persona 3 and its 2009 PlayStation Portable version Persona 3 Portable. Directed by Makoto Kimura, the plays used music by Shoji Meguro from the original games, with new songs by Mako Kuwabara. The plays were written by Kotora Kagurazaka. Jun Kumagai, the screenplay writer of the Persona 3 movies and Persona 4: The Animation, co-wrote The Blue Awakening and The Ultramarine Labyrinth with Kagurazaka. The musicals ran from 2014 to 2017.

The musicals star voice actors Shouta Aoi and Kana Asumi as the Persona 3 protagonist, who are named Sakuya Shiomi and Kotone Shiomi respectively. Two different versions of each play appeared on rotation during the run, with alternate dialogue and scenes depending on the protagonist.

== Production ==
A stage play adaptation was announced via flyers passed around at the 2013 Persona Music Fes. The stage play uses projection mapping, where backgrounds and special effects are projected onto the stage and screens, for a "2.5D experience." The plays included separate shows for the protagonists, who were named Sakuya Shiomi and Kotone Shiomi. Both protagonists had their own versions of the play, with some scenes exclusive to their own show, and they were performed on rotating schedules. While directing the plays, Kimura emphasized on character growth and strength in friendships. The plays were also broadcast live on Niconico.

The first play, The Blue Awakening (青の覚醒, Ao no Kakusei), which covers the story events from April to June, ran from January 8–12, 2014, at Theater G Rosso in Tokyo, Japan. It was given a home release on May 14, 2014.

The second play, The Ultramarine Labyrinth (群青の迷宮, Gunjō no Meikyū), which covers the story events from July to November, ran from September 16–24, 2014, at Theater 1010 in Tokyo, Japan. It was given a home release on January 28, 2015.

The third play, The Bismuth Crystals (蒼鉛の結晶, Souen no Kessho), which covers the story events in November, ran from June 5–13, 2015, at Theater G Rosso in Tokyo, Japan. It was given a home release on September 30, 2015.

The fourth and final plays The Indigo Pledge (藍の誓約, Ai no Seiyaku) and Beyond the Blue Sky (碧空の彼方へ, Heikiku no Kanata he), ran from April 14–23, 2017, at Theater G Rosso in Tokyo, Japan. The Indigo Pledge covers the story events from November to December, while Beyond the Blue Sky covers the story events from December to January. Ray Fujita, who plays Shinjiro, would be making guest appearances in the female protagonist version of Beyond the Blue Sky.

In 2018, Clie announced they would be releasing the musicals' soundtrack on March 5, 2019, for "Graduation Day", coinciding with the events from the end of the game.

== Synopsis ==
=== Act I: The Blue Awakening ===
10 years after a car accident leaving Sakuya/Kotone Shiomi's parents dead ("Interstice of Time"), he/she transfers to Gekkoukan High School ("Soul Phrase"). On his/her first night there, the dormitory is attacked by the Magician during the Dark Hour, causing him/her to awaken Orpheus. Because Sakuya/Kotone can use a Persona, he/she joins SEES (Specialized Extracurricular Execution Squad), a secret student organization dedicated to eliminating Shadows.

On the first day of school, Sakuya/Kotone meets SEES' newest recruit, Junpei Iori, and Fuuka Yamagishi. Sakuya/Kotone, Yukari Takeba, and Junpei invite her to the movies with them to help her move past her friends, who are bullying her. That night, SEES goes on their first mission at Tartarus, a Shadow-infested tower that only appears during the Dark Hour. Mitsuru Kirijo gets charmed, but she is rescued by Akihiko Sanada ("Wiping All Out"). Meanwhile, Sakuya/Kotone, Yukari, and Junpei fight the Priestess, as Junpei laments his frustrations about Sakuya/Kotone being the leader ("I Am No Hero"). After the battle, Yukari confides to Sakuya/Kotone about joining SEES to investigate her father's death ("Brand New Days").

When SEES later goes to the movie theater at Port Island, Shuji Ikutsuki notifies them that Fuuka is trapped in Tartarus. Though they get separated upon entering, Sakuya/Kotone finds Fuuka, who confesses that she's lonely ("A Place Where I Belong"). Meanwhile, Yukari and Mitsuru are attacked by the Emperor and Empress, who also defeat Junpei and Akihiko when they arrive. Fuuka is able to determine their weaknesses, to which Sakuya/Kotone exploits after a grueling fight. After the battle, Pharos forges a friendship with Sakuya/Kotone, which he/she reluctantly accepts as the play concludes ("Memories of You").

=== Act II: The Ultramarine Labyrinth ===
SEES goes on another mission to fight Shadows ("Burn My Dread"). Meanwhile, Aigis awakens in the Kirijo Labs ("Poem For Everyone's Souls"). SEES defeats the Hierophant, but it escapes to the Naganaki Shrine and reforms into the Lovers, where it attacks Koromaru and Ken Amada. Shinjiro Aragaki, a former SEES member, defeats it, and that night, Ken vows to get revenge on the Shadow who killed his mother three years ago ("On the Night of Nemesis").

After exams, SEES goes on a trip to Yakushima Island, where Sakuya/Kotone sees Aigis. At nightfall, Mitsuru's father, Takeharu Kirijo, tells SEES that the Dark Hour was the result of a failed experiment caused by the Kirijo Group. The Dark Hour, Tartarus, and Shadow attacks will only disappear if all twelve Arcana Shadows of the full moon are destroyed. As her father had been the experiment's head researcher, Yukari blames Mitsuru for hiding the truth. When Sakuya/Kotone follows her, they are attacked by Shadows. Aigis suddenly appears to defeat them, and she and Sakuya/Kotone identify a connection to each other ("Touch My Heartstrings"). Mitsuru identifies Aigis as the anti-Shadow weapon produced by her family's laboratory, and she allows her to join SEES.

After Takaya, Jin, and Chidori attack one of their targets ("Strega Theme"), Junpei meets Chidori at Port Island. Akihiko tells Shinjiro that Ken has joined SEES, and as they both reflect on their childhood ("Twin Souls"), he convinces Shinjiro to rejoin. During their next mission, Takuya and Jin trap SEES underground with the Justice and the Chariot ("Deep Breath, Deep Breath"). SEES then defeats the Hermit ("Battle For Everyone's Souls"). After Chidori is hospitalized from losing control of her Persona, Ken overhears that Shinjiro was the one who had killed his mother when he briefly lost control of his Persona. On the next full moon, he asks Shinjiro to meet him privately while the rest of SEES fights the Fortune and the Strength. Shinjiro is killed (Sakuya's version) or falls into a coma (Kotone's version) while protecting Ken from Takaya.

Akihiko visits Shinjiro in private ("Twin Souls (Reprise)") and gains the resolve to get stronger, transforming his Persona Polydeuces into Caesar. Sakuya/Kotone comforts Ken, which leads him to transforming his Persona Nemesis into Kala-Nemi. During the next full moon, half of the team face the Hanged Man while the other fights Takaya and Jin. Though Takaya and Jin escape, the Hanged Man is defeated. With all twelve Shadows gone, Pharos bids farewell to Sakuya/Kotone. SEES rejoices in their victory as the sun rises ("Brand New Days").

In a post-credits scene, Tartarus appears during the Dark Hour and Itsuki enters it, laughing.

=== Act III: The Bismuth Crystals ===
SEES celebrates, only to discover that the Dark Hour has not ended. When they meet Ikutsuki in front of Gekkoukan High School, he confesses that destroying the full moon Shadows freed parts of the Death Shadow that would reunite and destroy the world, admitting to lying to SEES to bring him closer to his goal. Aigis is rescued from his control, but he mortally wounds Mitsuru's father and jumps off Tartarus, leaving Mitsuru to mourn her father's death ("A Vulnerability Veiled in Fog"). Sakuya/Kotone winds up in the Velvet Room with Elizabeth (Sakuya's version) or Theodore (Kotone's version), who offers to assist ("Velvet Hierarchy"). Later, Akihiko decides that SEES disbands ("Your Name (Real)").

A new student, Ryoji Mochizuki, transfers into Sakuya/Kotone's class ("Shining World"). During the school trip to Kyoto, he comforts everyone and gives them advice on finding their path. With their determination restored, they decide to reform SEES ("Your Name (Reprise)"). Yukari watches an unedited copy of her father's video message, and she discovers he had been against the Kirijo Group's experiment. Renewing her faith, she transforms her Persona Io into Isis ("A Message Sent Through Time"). She confronts Mitsuru and convinces her to rejoin SEES, causing Mitsuru to transform her Persona Penthesilea into Artemesia. Now together, SEES continues their mission in Tartarus ("The Bismuth Crystals") as the play concludes ("Brand New Days").

In a post-credits scene, Aigis confronts Ryoji on Moonlight Bridge. Junpei screams for Chidori while facing off against Takaya and Jin.

=== Act IV: The Indigo Pledge ===
Natsuki tells Fuuka that she is moving away ("Gentle Blindfold"), while Junpei continues to visit Chidori at the hospital ("Fantasy Painting (Sunflowers)"). Meanwhile, as cases of Apathy Syndrome begin to skyrocket, the public seek solace in a cult headed by Takaya and Jin ("Messiah of the Fall"), who reveal that they had forced to wield Personas after the Kirijo Labs experimented on them. While Sakuya/Kotone, Akihiko, Ken, and Ryoji watch a Phoenix Rangers live show ("Phoenix Rangers Featherman R Theme Song"), Takaya and Jin free Chidori from the hospital. As Natsuki leaves, she and Fuuka reaffirm their friendship ("Gentle Blindfold (Bonds)"), allowing Fuuka to transform her Persona Lucia to Juno. Sakuya/Kotone receives a phone call from Elizabeth (Sakuya's version) or Theodore (Kotone's version), notified that another section of Tartarus has opened ("The Weird Masquerade").

One evening, Chidori challenges SEES to fight her at Tartarus. Junpei consoles her, only for Takaya to fatally shoot him. Chidori admits to Junpei that she has fallen in love and sacrifices her life energy to revive him ("Fantasy Painting (Sun)"). In rage, Junpei transforms his Persona Hermes into Trismegistus, forcing Takaya and Jin to retreat.

In December, Aigis confronts Ryoji on Moonlight Bridge. As both recall the events from 10 years ago, Aigis is heavily damaged from their altercation, while Ryoji remembers that he is Death, the 13th Shadow who had attacked Iwatodai 10 years ago. Sakuya/Kotone learns that Aigis had sealed Death inside him/her at that time in order to contain it, when he/she witnessed their battle after surviving the car accident. As Ryoji's presence will summon Nyx to destroy the world, he offers SEES to kill him, which will delay Nyx's arrival and erase their memories of the Dark Hour, allowing them to live blissfully before the world ends. He gives them until December 31 to decide. Throughout the rest of December, SEES reflect on their mission and decide that they will fight Nyx directly ("The Moment of Decision").

In a post-credits scene, Sakuya/Kotone visits Aigis in the Kirijo Labs.

=== Act V: Beyond the Blue Sky ===
Aigis returns from the Kirijo Labs, fully repaired. On December 31, SEES tells Ryoji that they have decided on fighting Nyx. Ryoji parts with them ("Shining World (Ballad ver.)"). They train and defeat Nyx.

While the rest of the group are attending the school's ending ceremony, Sakuya/Kotone goes on the rooftop with Aigis. The rest of SEES suddenly regain their memories and quickly leave. As Sakuya/Kotone starts to lose consciousness, he/she and Aigis exchange farewells ("Memories of You").

== Musical numbers ==
Act I

- "Interstice of Time" - Ensemble
- "Soul Phrase" - Sakuya/Kotone, Yukari, Junpei, Akihiko, Mitsuru, Fuuka
- "Wiping All Out" - Mitsuru, Akihiko
- "I Am No Hero" - Junpei
- "Brand New Days" - Yukari, Sakuya/Kotone
- "A Place Where I Belong" (私の居場所, Watashi no ibasho) - Fuuka
- "Memories of You" (キミの記憶, Kimi no kioku) - Sakuya/Kotone, Yukari, Junpei, Akihiko, Mitsuru, Fuuka

Act II

- "Burn My Dread" – Sakuya/Kotone
- "Poem For Everyone's Souls" (全ての人の魂の詩, Subete no Hito no Tamashī no Uta) - Aigis
- "On the Night of Nemesis" (ネメシスのあの夜, Nemeshisu no ano yoru) - Ken
- "Strega Theme" - Takaya, Jin, Chidori
- "Touch My Heartstrings" - Aigis, Sakuya/Kotone
- "Deep Breath, Deep Breath" - Shinjiro
- "Battle For Everyone's Souls" (全ての人の魂の戦い, Subete no Hito no Tamashī no Tatakai) - Fuuka, Aigis
- "Twin Souls" - Akihiko, Shinjiro
- "Twin Souls (Reprise)" - Akihiko
- "Brand New Days" - Sakuya/Kotone, Yukari, Junpei, Akihiko, Mitsuru, Fuuka, Aigis, Ken
- "Soul Phrase" - All

Act III

- "Soul Phrase" - Sakuya/Kotone, Yukari, Junpei, Akihiko, Mitsuru, Fuuka, Aigis, Ken
- "A Vulnerability Veiled in Fog" - Mitsuru
- "Velvet Hierarchy" (ベルベットの階層, Berubetto no kaisō) - Elizabeth and Sakuya (Sakuya's version), Theodore and Kotone (Kotone's version)
- "Your Name (Real)" - Sakuya/Kotone
- "Shining World" (輝く世界, Kagayaku sekai) - Ryoji
- "Your Name (Reprise)" - Sakuya/Kotone, Yukari, Junpei, Akihiko, Fuuka, Aigis, Ken
- "A Message Sent Through Time" (時を越えたメッセージ, Toki o koeta messēji) - Yukari
- "The Bismuth Crystals" (蒼鉛の結晶, Sōen no Kesshō) - Sakuya/Kotone, Yukari, Junpei, Akihiko, Mitsuru, Fuuka, Aigis, Ken, Takaya, Jin, ensemble
- "Brand New Days" - All
- "Soul Phrase" - All

Act IV

- "Poem For Everyone's Souls" - Elizabeth (Sakuya's version), Theodore (Kotone's version)
- "Gentle Blindfold" (やさしい目隠し, Yasashii Mekakushi) - Fuuka and Natsuki
- "Fantasy Painting (Sunflowers)" (幻想絵画 ～向日葵～, Genzo Kaiga ~Himawari~) - Junpei and Chidori
- "Messiah of the Fall" (滅びのメシア, Horobi no Meshia) - Takaya, Jin, and ensemble
- "Phoenix Rangers Featherman R Theme Song" (不死鳥戦隊フェザーマンRのテーマ, Fushicho Sentai Fezaman R no Tema) - Akihiko and Ken
- "The Weird Masquerade" - Sakuya/Kotone
- "Communication!"
- "Search for the Heart" (ココロ。探して, Kokoro Sagashite)
- "Gentle Blindfold (Bonds)" (やさしい目隠し ～キズナ～, Yasashii Mekakushi ~Kizuna~) - Fuuka and Natsuki with Sakuya/Kotone, Junpei, Yukari, Aigis, Mitsuru, and Akihiko
- "Fantasy Painting (Sun)" (幻想絵画 ～太陽～, Genzo Kaiga ~Taiyo~) - Junpei and Chidori
- "The Moment of Decision" (決断の刻, Ketsudan no Toki) - Sakuya/Kotone, Yukari, Junpei, Akihiko, Mitsuru, Fuuka, Aigis, and Ken

Act V

- "Shining World (Ballad ver.)" - Ryoji
- "Strega's Theme (Salvation)" (ストレガのテーマ ～救済～, Sutorega no Tema ~Kyuusai~) - Takaya, Jin, and ensemble
- "Seasons of Memory"
- "Memories of You" (キミの記憶, Kimi no Kioku) - Aigis, Yukari, Junpei, Akihiko, Mitsuru, Fuuka, Ken
- Brand New Days - All
- Soul Phrase - All

== Principal roles and original cast members ==
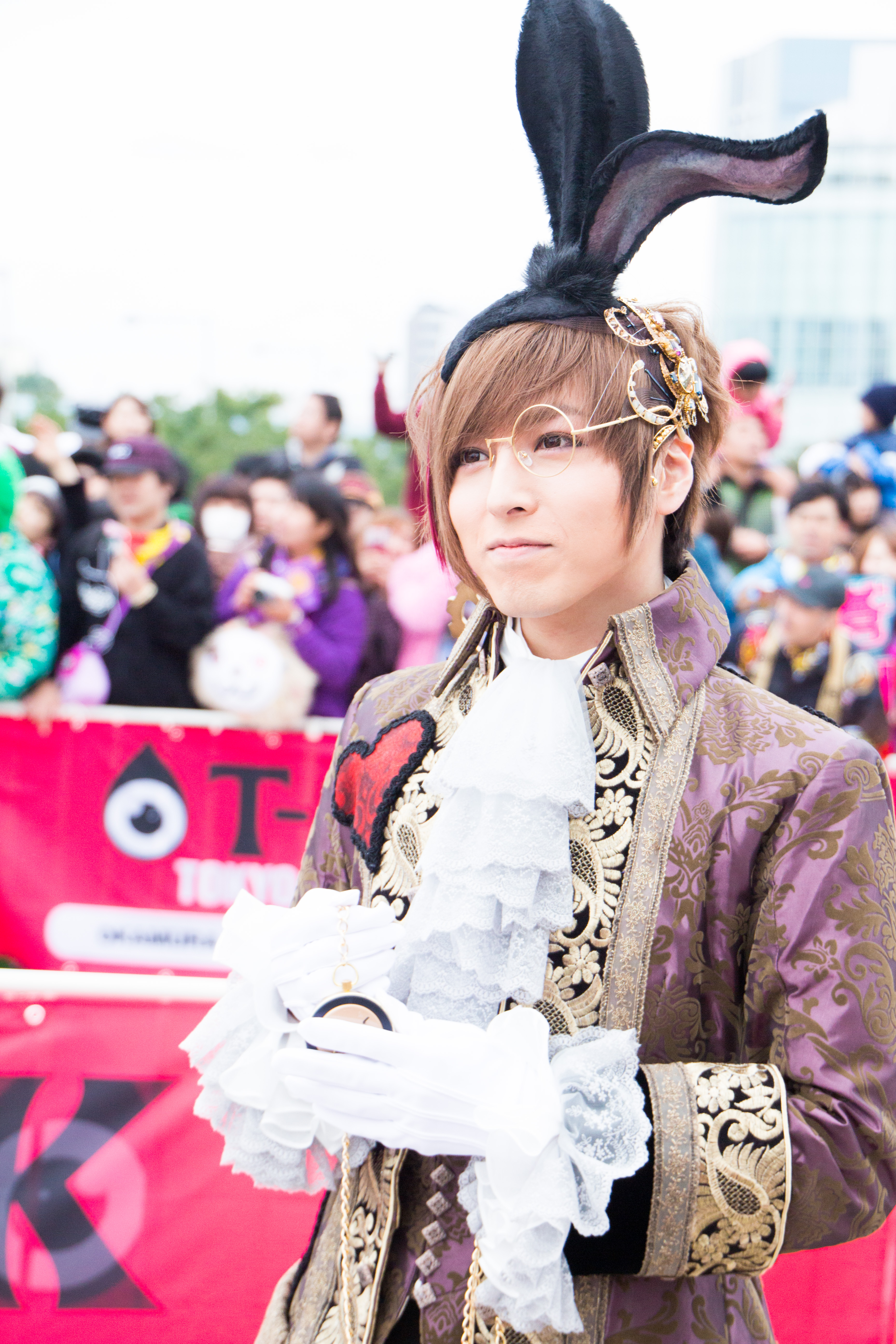
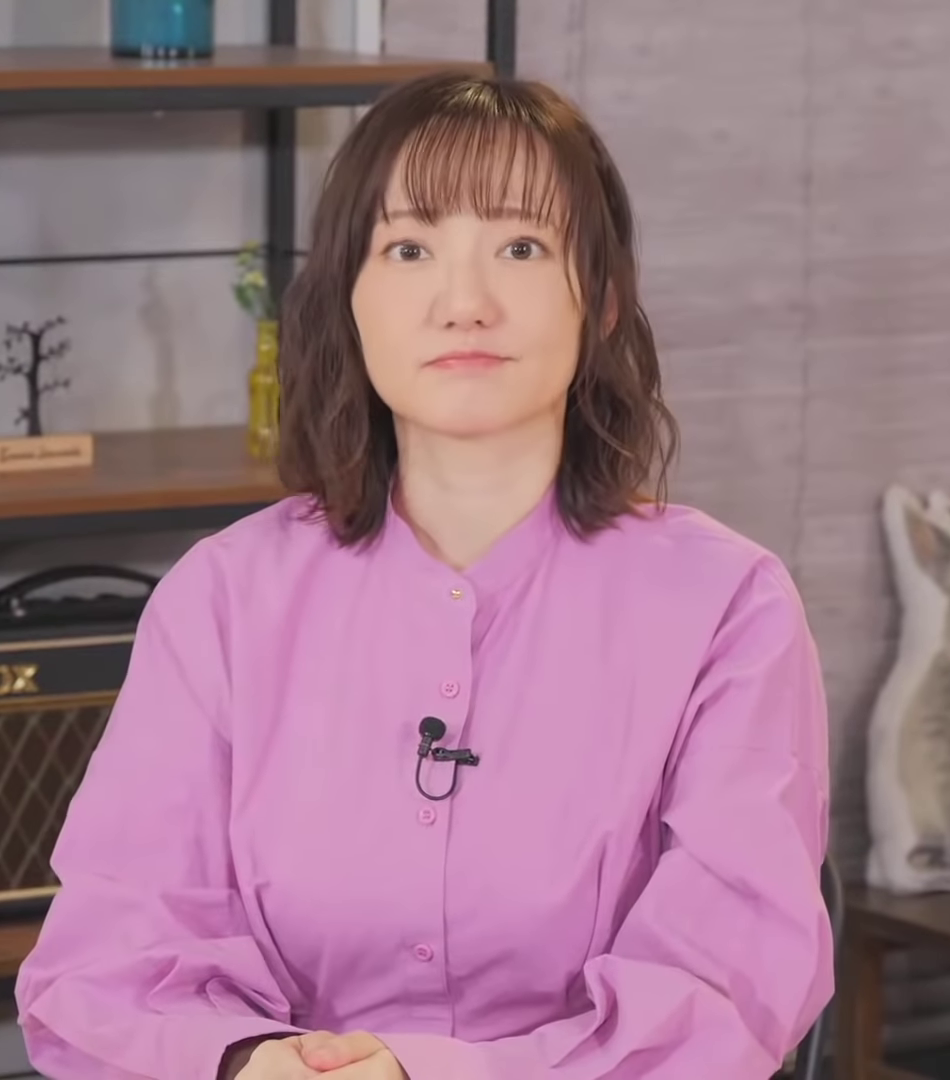
Shouta Aoi (left, 2016) and Kana Asumi (right, 2021) starred as the male and female protagonists respectively.

Character	Cast
Sakuya Shiomi (male protagonist)	Shouta Aoi
Kotone Shiomi (female protagonist)	Kana Asumi
Yukari Takeba	Maho Tomita
Junpei Iori	Genki Okawa
Akihiko Sanada	Yuki Fujiwara
Mitsuru Kirijo	Asami Tano
Fuuka Yamagishi	Marina Tanoue
Aigis	ZAQ
Ken Amada	Waku Sakaguchi; Tomonori Suzuki
Shinjiro Aragaki	Ray Fujita
Shuji Ikutsuki	Shoichi Honda (The Blue Awakening); Mitsuru Karahashi (The Ultramarine Labyrinth and The Bismuth Crystals)
Takaya	Takeya Nishiyama
Jin	Yuichi Matsumoto
Chidori	Yuri Hane
Pharos / Ryoji Mochizuki / Nyx	Keisuke Ueda
Elizabeth	Riyu Kosaka
Theodore	Ire Shiozaki

== Critical reception ==
The DVD release for The Blue Awakening debuted at #11 on Oricon's Weekly DVD Chart and charted for two weeks.

Richard Eisenbeis from Kotaku reviewed The Ultramarine Labyrinth favorably, but cited the stage plays' weaknesses in its ballads and the protagonists' lack of personalities. The DVD release for The Ultramarine Labyrinth debuted at #22 on Oricon's Weekly DVD Chart and charted for two weeks.

The DVD release for The Bismuth Crystals debuted at #27 on Oricon's Weekly DVD Chart and charted for two weeks.

The DVD release for The Indigo Pledge debuted at #28 on Oricon's Weekly DVD Chart and charted for three weeks.

The DVD release for Beyond the Blue Sky debuted at #19 on Oricon's Weekly DVD Chart and charted for two weeks.
