= Persona 3 The Movie: No. 3, Falling Down =

2015 animated film

Persona 3 The Movie: #3 Falling Down
- Theatrical release poster. Right caption reads, "Time does not wait. It delivers us all equally to the same end."
- Directed by: Keitaro Motonaga
- Written by: Jun Kumagai
- Story by: Atlus
- Based on: Persona 3 by Atlus
- Starring: Akira Ishida; Megumi Toyoguchi; Kōsuke Toriumi; Rie Tanaka; Hikaru Midorikawa; Mamiko Noto; Maaya Sakamoto; Megumi Ogata; Kazuya Nakai; Isamu Tanonaka; Miyuki Sawashiro
- Edited by: Takashi Sakurai
- Music by: Tetsuya Kobayashi; Shoji Meguro
- Production company: A-1 Pictures
- Distributed by: Aniplex
- Release date: April 4, 2015
- Running time: 87 minutes
- Country: Japan
- Language: Japanese

Persona 3 The Movie: #3 Falling Down (劇場版「ペルソナ3」第3章, Gekijōban Perusona 3 Dai San Shō) is a 2015 Japanese animated film and the third installment in a film series based on the Persona 3 video game by Atlus. It is based on the original story by Atlus and distributed by Aniplex. The film is directed by Keitaro Motonaga and written by Jun Kumagai. It stars voice actors Akira Ishida, Megumi Toyoguchi, Kōsuke Toriumi, Rie Tanaka, Hikaru Midorikawa, Mamiko Noto, Maaya Sakamoto, Megumi Ogata and Kazuya Nakai. A sequel, titled Persona 3 The Movie: #4 Winter of Rebirth, was released in January 2016.

== Plot ==
The movie starts with Junpei being kidnapped by a member of Strega, Chidori Yoshino, while Makoto and the rest are fighting Takaya, Jin, and the Shadow Arcana Hanged Man. As they're fighting, Makoto is knocked unconscious and sees a vision of Pharos, telling Makoto that he will be leaving despite Makoto's plead for him not to. Awakened, Makoto and his friends succeed in defeating the Shadow Arcana and save Junpei. Following the Shadow's defeat, Takaya and Jin retreat while Chidori is captured by SEES. The next day, Makoto and his friends along with Takeharu Kirijo decide to celebrate their victory for defeating all twelve Shadow Arcana and destroying Dark Hour. However, during the celebration party when the time reaches midnight, the Dark Hour started. They confront Ikutsuki at Tartarus, revealing that he had changed the recordings made by Yukari's father to lead them to defeating the twelve Shadow Arcana, which will bring the end of the world known as "The Fall". Using Aigis' controller, he controls Aigis to capture and crucify all SEES members except Takeharu whom Aigis holds at gunpoint. Takeharu breaks free and shoots Ikutsuki, but he is fatally shot as well by the latter, killing him. Just before Aigis could kill them, she regains control of herself and frees her friends. Cornered, Ikutsuki falls to his death from the tower due to his gunshot wound.

Distraught by Ikutsuki's betrayal, Takeharu's death, and the Dark Hour remaining, Makoto and his friends are left wondering what they should do from now on. Losing Shinjiro, Pharos, and Takeharu, and Ikutsuki's betrayal makes Makoto starting to detach himself from his friends, believing that bonding with them would only bring pain. Meanwhile, Junpei starts to grow closer to Chidori and develops feelings for her. Entering new semester, a transfer student named Ryoji Mochizuki transfers to Makoto's class. He quickly gains Aigis' dislike who continuously states that he is not good. Ryoji occasionally attempts to befriend Makoto despite the latter's refusal, following him everywhere and even takes the same part-time job as Makoto. Seeing that Makoto doesn't really do any after school activities, he suggests that they create a "Helping Out" club, which Makoto reluctantly agrees to. As they do the club activities together, Makoto slowly become close friends with Ryoji, much to Aigis' dismay.

Makoto and his friends then participate in a school trip at Kyoto. At this time, Yukari confronts Mitsuru, who is still saddened by her father's death and pressured by the responsibility he left to her as the head of Kirijo Group, leading Mitsuru to lose her will to live. Yukari encourages her to keep living in her father's place as he wished her to instead of continuing to lament his death, convincing Mitsuru that she's not alone. Back at the hotel, Makoto, Junpei, Akihiko, and Ryoji stay at the hot spring until the girl's bath time without their realizing. They start to panic when Mitsuru, Yukari, Fuuka, and Aigis enter the hot spring. Despite their attempt to sneak out, the girls find them, leaving them at the mercy of Aigis who threatens them with her gun while Mitsuru "executes" them.

Back at the hospital, Takaya and Jin break into Chidori's hospital room, convincing Chidori to leave. Entering Dark Hour, Chidori calls SEES to come at the entrance of Tartarus. Junpei arrives ahead the others, trying to convince Chidori to return, but she tries to kill him. Although Makoto and the others are with him, Junpei tells them to stand back and leave Chidori to him. Junpei eventually is able to calm down Chidori, who reveals that when she is with him, she becomes afraid of death. Junpei then reveals that he feels the same and he does not want to lose her, wishing for her to stay by his side. Criticizing Chidori's weakness, Takaya shoots Junpei, fatally wounding him. Finally realizing her feelings for him, Chidori sacrifices her life to revive Junpei and professes her love for him before she dies. Junpei's Persona and Chidori's merge, becoming Trismegistus. With Makoto's support, they overpower Takaya and Jin, forcing them to retreat. Greatly saddened by Chidori's death, Junpei regains his resolve to fight for her sake once discovering that her sketchbook is filled with her portraits of him.

At December 2, Aigis gains access to her damaged circuit, recovering her lost memories as the Dark Hour hits. At the Moonlight Bridge, Ryoji stares at the full moon and is confronted by Aigis. She finally remembers that Ryoji is actually a Shadow known as Death that she had sealed 10 years ago and determines to defeat him, leading them to clash. At the same time, Makoto starts to remember the night when his parents died, remembering Aigis fighting a Shadow at the same night. Makoto quickly goes to the bridge, only to see Aigis lying defeated on the ground with Ryoji standing over her just as he arrived.

== Promotion ==
=== Previews ===
#3 Falling Down was first teased at the end of the Persona 3 The Movie: #2 Midsummer Knight's Dream feature film which began screening in Japan from June 7, 2014.

== Sequel ==
The film's post-credits sequence announced that a sequel, later titled Persona 3 The Movie: #4 Winter of Rebirth would be "coming soon". The sequel was later released in January 2016.
