= Isamu Tanonaka =

Japanese actor and narrator (1932–2010)

- 田の中 勇
- Born: July 19, 1932; Taitō, Tokyo, Japan
- Died: January 13, 2010 (aged 77); Setagaya, Tokyo, Japan
- Occupations: Actor; voice actor; narrator
- Agent: Aoni Production
- Website: Official profile

Isamu Tanonaka (田の中 勇, Tanonaka Isamu; July 19, 1932 – January 13, 2010) was a Japanese actor, voice actor and narrator from Taitō, Tokyo.

He was best known for voicing Medama Oyaji in nearly every adaptation of Shigeru Mizuki's GeGeGe no Kitarō made during his lifetime.

== Career ==
During his life he had been attached to Gekidan Tōgei and then Theatre Echo; he was attached to Aoni Production at the time of his death. He had a naturally deep voice but became famous for voicing characters with a high pitched voice. In addition to GeGeGe no Kitarō, he also had prominent roles in Tensai Bakabon (as the first voice of Honkan-san), Mazinger Z (as Mucha), Paul's Miraculous Adventure (as Doppe), Magical Princess Minky Momo (as Sindbook), Akuma-kun (as Youaltepuztli), Dr. Slump & Arale-chan (as Gara and Akira Toriyama), Dragon Quest: Dai no Daibōken (as Brass), and the Persona series (as Igor).

=== Medama Oyaji ===
In 1968, he was cast in the first GeGeGe no Kitarō anime as the title character's father Medama Oyaji, an anthropomorphic eyeball. He reprised the role, alongside co-stars Masako Nozawa (Kitarō) and Chikao Ōtsuka (Nezumi-Otoko), in the 1971 follow up color series. When it came time for the 1980s series the producers decided to go with an all new voice cast, but auditions for Medama Oyaji came up short so Tanonaka was asked to reprise the role yet again. From there he continued to voice the character in practically every adaptation made during his lifetime, the sole exception being the PlayStation 2 games from the early 2000s, in which the role was given to Kazuo Kumakura, and a single episode of the 1971 series, where Hiroshi Ōtake filled in for him. Tanonaka performed the voice of Medama Oyaji for the live action adaptations, and also appeared on many variety shows and in many commercials as the character. In 2008, he reunited with Nozawa and Ōtsuka to reprise their respective roles for the darker Kitarō adaptation Hakaba Kitarō. As Medama Oyaji is actually the reanimated form of Kitarō's deceased father, the character was voiced by Daisuke Gōri when he appeared alive in the first episode.

== Death ==
On January 13, 2010, Tanonaka suffered a heart attack in his Tokyo home and was found dead by family members. He was 77 years old at the time of his death. His final performance was in Marie & Gali as the voice of Leonardo da Vinci. Memorial services were held in Tokyo Memolead Hall on January 19, 2010. He is survived by his older brother Hiroshi.

== Roles ==
=== Television ===
1964

- Zero Sen Hayato (Ichihisō Hosokawa)

1965

- Kaitō Pride (Scope)
- Obake no Q-tarō (TBS edition) (Shōta's Papa)

1967

- Punpunmaru (Gatekeeper, Narrator)

1968

- Akane-chan (Kadomatsu)
- Animal 1 (Tōgorō)
- GeGeGe no Kitarō (Medama Oyaji)

1969

- Hakushon Daimaō (Kan-chan's Papa)
- Sazae-san (Ceiling Mouse)

1970

- Ashita no Joe (Miss Oyama (episode 35))

1971

- GeGeGe no Kitarō (second series) (Medama Oyaji)
- Kunimatsu-sama no Otōridai (Odeko)
- Tensai Bakabon (Honkan-san)

1972

- Mazinger Z (Mucha)

1973

- Cutie Honey (Saint Chapel Academy Principal)
- Wansa-kun (Roro)

1975

- UFO Robo Grendizer (Mucha)
- Maya the Honey Bee (Max)

1976

- Paul no Miracle Daisakusen (Doppe)

1978

- Ginga Tetsudō 999 (President Derumukade (episode 38))
- Majokko Tickle (Ago)

1979

- Cyborg 009 (Loki, Doctor Rōson)
- Ginga Tetsudō 999 (Kokku (episode 53))

1980

- Haero Bun Bun (Big)
- Moero Arthur Hakuba no Ōji (Sandee)

1981

- Dr. Slump & Arale-chan (Gara, Toriyama (Tori Robo), Annai Obake, Dodongadon, Villager, Crow Leader)
- Shin Taketori Monogatari: Sennen Joō (Ramen-monger's uncle)
- Yattodetaman (Chairman)

1982

- Gyakuten! Ippatsuman (Urashima)
- Mahō no Princess Minky Momo (Sindbook)
- Ochamegami Monogatari Korokoro Poron (Beauty Artist)

1983

- Itadakiman (Nika)
- Manga Nihonshi (Sesshū)

1985

- GeGeGe no Kitarō (third series) (Medama Oyaji)

1987

- Dragon Ball (Gara)

1989

- Akuma-kun (Youaltepuztli)
- Dragon Ball Z (Raichi (episodes 40-44))
- Gakiden (Father)
- Peter Pan no Bōken (Ton Chihōte)
- Ranma ½: Nettōhen (Nikuman #2)

1990

- Moomin (Thingumy)

1991

- Dragon Quest: Dai no Daibōken (Brass)
- Getter Robo Gō (Doctor Tama)

1992

- Crayon Shin-chan (Saint)

1993

- Kenyū Densetsu Yaiba (Obaba)

1995

- Bonobono (Kuzuri-kun's Father)
- Dragon Ball Z (Bibidi (episode 277))

1996

- Elf wo Karumono-tachi (Jii-chan Elf)
- GeGeGe no Kitarō (fourth series) (Medama Oyaji)

1999

- Digimon Adventure (Pikkoromon)

2000

- Pocket Monsters (Old Man Tsubo)

2002

- Final Fantasy: Unlimited (Frog Hermit (episode 17))

2003

- One Piece (Shōjō)

2007

- GeGeGe no Kitarō (fifth series) (Medama Oyaji)

2008

- Hakaba Kitarō (Medama Oyaji)
- Negibōsu no Asatarō (Jii-san)
- Persona: Trinity Soul (Igor)

2009

- Marie & Gali (Leonardo da Vinci)

2011

- Persona 4: The Animation (Igor, archived audio)

2014

- Persona 4: The Golden Animation (Igor, archived audio)

=== OVA ===
- Bokuha Ōsama series (Cabinet Minister Wan)
- Haja Taisei Dangaiō (Shoulder Clown)
- Tengai Makyō: Jiraiya Oboro Hen (Oboke)

=== Theatrical animation ===
- One Piece: Clockwork Island Adventure (2001) (Boo Jack)
- Palme no Ki (2002) (Zakuro)
- Persona 3 The Movie: No. 1, Spring of Birth (2013) (Igor, archived audio)
- Persona 3 The Movie: No. 2, Midsummer Knight's Dream (2014) (Igor, archived audio)
- Persona 3 The Movie: No. 3, Falling Down (2015) (Igor, archived audio)
- Persona 3 The Movie: No. 4, Winter of Rebirth (2016) (Igor, archived audio)

unknown date

- Dr. Slump (Gara)
- GeGeGe no Kitarō (Medama Oyaji)
- GeGeGe no Kitarō: Daikaijū (Medama Oyaji)
- GeGeGe no Kitarō: Gekitotsu!! Ijigen Yōkai no Daihanran (Medama Oyaji)
- GeGeGe no Kitarō: Obake Nighter (Medama Oyaji)
- GeGeGe no Kitarō: Saikyō Yōkai Gundan! Nippon Jōriku!! (Medama Oyaji)
- GeGeGe no Kitarō: Yōkai Daisensō (Medama Oyaji)
- GeGeGe no Kitarō: Yōkai Tokkyū! Maboroshi no Kishu (Medama Oyaji)
- Gekijōban: GeGeGe no Kitarō: Nippon Bakuretsu (Medama Oyaji)
- Mazinger Z tai Ankoku Daishōgun (Mucha)
- Mazinger Z tai Devilman (Mucha)
- Nagagutsu o Haita Neko (Killer B)
- Nagagutsu Sanjūshi (Killer B)
- Nagagutsu o Haita Neko: Hachijū Nichi-kan Sekaiisshū (Killer B)
- Ultraman USA (Ulysses)
- Urusei Yatsura: Itsudatte My Darling (Commanding Officer)

=== Video games ===
- Dragon Ball: Raging Blast (Rō Kaiōshin)
- Dragon Ball Z 3 (Rō Kaiōshin)
- Dragon Ball Z Sparking! (Rō Kaiōshin)
- Dragon Ball Z Sparking! Meteor (Rō Kaiōshin)
- Dragon Knight II (Pharmacist)
- GeGeGe no Kitarō (Medama Oyaji)
- GeGeGe no Kitarō: Yōkai Daiundōkai (Medama Oyaji)
- Jak and Daxter: The Precursor Legacy (Farmer)
- One Piece Grand Battle! 3 (Shōjō)
- Persona 3 (Igor, Mister Ekoda)
- Persona 4 (Igor)
- Persona 4 Arena (Igor, archived audio)
- Persona 4 Arena Ultimax (Igor, archived audio)
- Persona 5 (Igor, archived audio)

=== Tokusatsu ===
- Chouriki Sentai Ohranger (Bara Baby)

=== Dubbing roles ===
==== Live action ====
- Bewitched ("Daddy Comes for a Visit", "Darrin the Warlock") (Silas Bliss Junior)
- The NeverEnding Story (Nighthob (Tilo Prückner))
- Star Trek: Deep Space Nine (Grand Nagus Zek (Wallace Shawn))
- Star Wars: Episode I – The Phantom Menace (Jar Jar Binks)
- Star Wars: Episode II – Attack of the Clones (Jar Jar Binks)

==== Animation ====
- Alice in Wonderland (TBS edition) (King of Hearts, Dormouse)
- Aladdin (Aziz)
- The Flintstones (Barney Rubble)
- The Mask: Animated Series (Mayor Mortimer Tilton)
- One Hundred and One Dalmatians (Old edition) (Pongo)
- Teenage Mutant Ninja Turtles (Video edition) (Krang)
- Top Cat (Officer Dibble)

=== Film ===
- GeGeGe no Kitarō (Medama Oyaji (voice))
- GeGeGe no Kitarō: Sennen Noroi Uta (Medama Oyaji (voice))

=== Radio ===
- Seishun Adventure ("Fengshen Yanyi") (NHK-FM) (Yúnzhōngzǐ)

=== Other ===
- Gakkō no Kaidan (Trailer voice-over)
- Kitaro ga Mita Gyokusai - Mizuki Shigeru no Senso (2007) (Medama Oyaji's voice)
- Masudaya Corporation Mōrā commercial (1975) (Mōrā (voice))
- Nep League (May 7, 2007) (Medama Oyaji's voice)
