= Yuka Komatsu =

Japanese actress, voice actress and narrator (born 1978)

- 小松 由佳
- Born: March 8, 1978 (age 48); Tokyo, Japan
- Occupations: Actress; voice actress; narrator
- Years active: 2000–present
- Agent: Aoni Production
- Notable work: Fresh Pretty Cure! as Eas/Setsuna Higashi/Cure Passion; Panty & Stocking with Garterbelt as Scanty
- Height: 155 cm (5 ft 1 in)

Yuka Komatsu (小松 由佳, Komatsu Yuka; born March 8, 1978) is a Japanese actress, voice actress, and narrator from Tokyo, affiliated with Aoni Production.

== Biography ==
Komatsu's father was a filmmaker and her mother grew up in a family atmosphere where the movies were nearby. Since childhood, her dream was to become a filmmaker. To this end, she began to write scenarios of the stage by the advice, and proceeded to the road of the stage, though the writer of the movie was aiming at the same time. She came to be in charge of directing at her university, sometimes voluntarily standing in as an actor, and became a performing actor. Although she continued to work at a theatrical company, she desired to make a movie someday, and worked as a projector. However, she realized how hard it would be to make a living on that path, and still wanted to do a job related to her favorite movie, so she aspired to be a voice actor.

== Filmography ==
=== Television animation ===
2000s

- Shaman King (2001) (Eliza Faust; Silver Rod)
- Hajime no Ippo (2001) (Reiko)
- Witch Hunter Robin (2002) (Mika Hanamura)
- Kinnikuman (2002) (Norika)
- World of Narue (2003) (Kazuto's sister)
- F-Zero: GP Legend (2004) (Mrs. Arrow)
- Black Cat (2005) (Merle)
- Onegai My Melody (2005) (Wanmi)
- The Wallflower (2006) (Mine Nakahara)
- Hatara Kizzu Maihamu Gumi (2007) (Jean)
- Moonlight Mile (2007) (Kim)
- Hammerin' Harry (2008) (Miwako Tamura)
- Gunslinger Girl: Il Teatrino (2008) (Rachelle)
- Golgo 13 (2008) (Gina)
- Blade of the Immortal (2008) (Toki Asano)
- Tegami Bachi (2009) (Pistis; Sara)
- Fresh Pretty Cure! (2009) (Eas/Setsuna Higashi/Cure Passion)

2010s

- Naruto: Shippuden (2010) (Karui)
- Panty & Stocking with Garterbelt (2010) (Scanty)
- We Without Wings (2011) (Masako Takauchi)
- Tegami Bachi: Reverse (2011) (Sara)
- Jormungand: Perfect Order (2012) (Kurosaka)
- Last Exile: Fam, the Silver Wing (2012) (Alauda (fifteen years old))
- Duel Masters Victory V3 (2013) (Perfect Madonna)
- Kindaichi Case Files R (2014) (Yui Kagaya)
- JoJo's Bizarre Adventure: Stardust Crusaders (2014) (Sherry Polnareff)
- Hero Bank (2014) (Hikari Takarano)
- Haikyū!! 2nd Season \ Haikyū!! 3rd Season (2015 \ 2016) (Saeko Tanaka)
- Yuri!! on Ice (2016) (Minako Okukawa)
- Dragon Ball Super (2017) (Caulifla)
- One Piece (2017, 2020) (Sarie Nantokanette, Sarahebi)

2020s

- BNA: Brand New Animal (2020) (Elsa)
- Great Pretender (2020) (Dorothy)
- Yashahime: Princess Half-Demon (2021) (Sea Snake Woman)
- New Panty & Stocking with Garterbelt (2025) (Scanty)

=== OVA ===
- Digital Juice "Table & Fishman" (2002) (Queen of Singer)
- Re: Cutie Honey (2004) (Rinko Terada)
- Saint Seiya: The Hades Chapter - Inferno (2005) (Ophiuchus Shaina)
- Demon Prince Enma (2006) (Lola)
- Saint Seiya: The Hades Chapter - Elysion (2008) (Ophiuchus Shaina)

=== Theatrical animation ===
- Mobile Suit Zeta Gundam: A New Translation - Heirs to the Stars (2005) (Kikka Kobayashi)
- Mobile Suit Zeta Gundam: A New Translation III - Love is the Pulse of the Stars (2006) (Kikka Kobayashi)
- Pretty Cure All Stars series (2009–18) (Setsuna Higashi/Cure Passion)
- Naruto the Movie: Blood Prison (2011) (Karui)
- Persona 3 The Movie: No. 1, Spring of Birth (2013) (Isako Toriumi)
- Sailor Moon Cosmos (2023) (Sailor Chi)

=== Video games ===
- Persona 3 (2006) (Natsuki Moriyama; Isako Toriumi)
- Edelweiss (2006) (Mizuki Hinata)
- Another Century's Episode Portable (2010) (Orsa)
- Trinity: Souls of Zill O'll (2010) (Sheelagh)
- Saint Seiya: Sanctuary Battle (2011) (Ophiuchus Shaina, Black Eagle)
- TERA (2011) Japanese-dubbed version) (Fraya)
- Kid Icarus: Uprising (2012) (Phosphora)
- E.X. Troopers (2012) (Diana Highline)
- Kingdom Hearts 3D: Dream Drop Distance (Quorra)
- Dragon's Dogma: Dark Arisen (2013) (Kina)
- Toukiden Kiwami (2014) (Rinne)
- Deception IV: Blood Deception (2014), Freise Grayden
- Xenoblade Chronicles X (2015) (Ryyz)
- Dragon Ball Xenoverse (2015) Time Patroller (Female 8)
- Dragon Ball Xenoverse 2 (2016) Time Patroller (Female 8)
- Super Smash Bros. Ultimate (2018) (Phosphora)
- Dissidia Final Fantasy Opera Omnia (2019) Beatrix
- Final Fantasy VII Remake (2020) Madam M
- Persona 3 Reload (2024) Isako Toriumi
- Final Fantasy VII Rebirth (2024) Madam M

=== Dubbing ===
==== Live-action ====
- Anne Hathaway
  - The Devil Wears Prada (Andrea "Andy" Sachs)
  - Love & Other Drugs (Maggie Murdock)
  - Valentine's Day (Elizabeth "Liz" Curran)
  - One Day (Emma Morley)
  - Song One (Franny Ellis)
  - Serenity (Karen Zariakas)
- Alphas (Skylar Adams (Summer Glau))
- Another Life (Harper Glass (Selma Blair))
- Arrow (Helena Bertinelli/Huntress (Jessica De Gouw))
- The Asian Connection (Avalon)
- Avatar (Neytiri (Zoe Saldaña))
- Avatar: The Way of Water (Neytiri (Zoe Saldaña))
- Bachelor Party 2: The Last Temptation (Judith (Stacy Ann Rose))
- Baggage Claim (Montana Moore (Paula Patton))
- Black Swan (Lily (Mila Kunis))
- Blindness (Woman with Dark Glasses (Alice Braga))
- Blonde Ambition (Katie Gregerstitch (Jessica Simpson))
- Boardwalk Empire (Lillian "Billie" Kent (Meg Chambers Steedle))
- Camp Rock 2: The Final Jam (Dana Turner (Chloe Bridges))
- The Chair (Danielle Velayo (Alanna Chisholm))
- Cheaper by the Dozen 2 (Anne Murtaugh (Jaime King))
- Chuck (Hannah Olsen (Kristen Kreuk))
- The Cloverfield Paradox (Mina Jensen (Elizabeth Debicki))
- Confessions of a Shopaholic (Rebecca Bloomwood (Isla Fisher))
- Covert Affairs (Reva Kline (Jaimie Alexander))
- Cowboys & Aliens (Ella Swenson (Olivia Wilde))
- Dirt (Julia Mallory (Laura Allen))
- Dr. Dolittle: Tail to the Chief (Courtney Sterling (Elise Gatien))
- Final Destination 2 (2006 TV Tokyo edition) (Kimberly Corman (A. J. Cook))
- Generation Um... (Violet (Bojana Novakovic))
- Get Out (Rose Armitage (Allison Williams))
- Get Smart (Judy (Kelly Karbacz))
- Girls (Marnie Michaels (Allison Williams))
- The Glass House (2005 TV Asahi edition) (Ruby Baker (Leelee Sobieski))
- Graceland (Catherine "Charlie" DeMarco (Vanessa Ferlito))
- The Great Gatsby (Jordan Baker (Elizabeth Debicki))
- Grey's Anatomy (Dr. Lauren Boswell (Hilarie Burton))
- Hart of Dixie (Lemon Breeland (Jaime King))
- Hellraiser: Deader (Marla (Georgina Rylance))
- I Am Number Four (Number Six (Teresa Palmer))
- iCarly episode "iFind Spencer Friends" (Heather (Emma Stone))
- Impeachment: American Crime Story (Monica Lewinsky (Beanie Feldstein))
- John Tucker Must Die (Heather Straham (Ashanti))
- Kamen Rider: Dragon Knight (Lacey Sheridan (Marisa Lauren))
- Kyle XY (Jessi Hollander (Jaimie Alexander))
- Las Vegas (Delinda Deline (Molly Sims))
- Lockout (Emilie Warnock (Maggie Grace))
- Lola Versus (Lola (Greta Gerwig))
- Momentum (Alexis "Alex" Farraday (Olga Kurylenko))
- Monster (Erin Lynch (Erin Evans))
- Mr. Popper's Penguins (Pippi (Ophelia Lovibond))
- The Nanny Diaries (Lynette (Alicia Keys))
- New Amsterdam (Georgia Goodwin (Lisa O'Hare))
- Nurse 3D (Danni Rodgers (Katrina Bowden))
- One Missed Call (Beth Raymond (Shannyn Sossamon))
- Pan Am (Ginny Saddler (Erin Cummings))
- PK (Jagat "Jaggu" Janani Sahani (Anushka Sharma))
- Post Grad (Jessica Bard (Catherine Reitman))
- Private Valentine: Blonde & Dangerous (Private Megan Valentine (Jessica Simpson))
- Read It and Weep (Isabella "Is" (Danielle Panabaker))
- Resident Evil: Extinction (Betty Greer (Ashanti))
- Rush (Marlene Lauda (Alexandra Lara))
- Safe House (2018 BS Japan edition) (Ana Moreau (Nora Arnezeder))
- Scouts Guide to the Zombie Apocalypse (Denise Russo (Sarah Dumont))
- The Secret Life of Walter Mitty (2019 THE CINEMA edition) (Odessa Mitty (Kathryn Hahn))
- She Said (Jodi Kantor (Zoe Kazan))
- The Sisterhood of the Traveling Pants (Bridget Vreeland (Blake Lively))
- The Sisterhood of the Traveling Pants 2 (Bridget Vreeland (Blake Lively))
- The Sitter (Roxanne (Kylie Bunbury))
- Space Buddies (Sam's mother (Kendall Cross))
- Species: The Awakening (Collette (Cynthia Francesconi))
- Spring Break Shark Attack (Karen (Bianca Lishansky))
- Squid Game (Han Mi-nyeo (Kim Joo-ryoung))
- Step Up Revolution (Emily Anderson (Kathryn McCormick))
- Stuck in the Suburbs (Brittany Aarons (Danielle Panabaker))
- Their Finest (Catrin Cole (Gemma Arterton))
- The Thieves (Julie (Angelica Lee))
- Treasure Buddies (Ubasti (Elaine Hendrix))
- Tron: Legacy (Quorra (Olivia Wilde))
- Vicky Cristina Barcelona (Vicky (Rebecca Hall))
- Warcraft (Garona Halforcen (Paula Patton))
- Whip It (Bliss Cavendar/Babe Ruthless (Elliot Page))
- Wrong Turn 3: Left for Dead (Alex Hale (Janet Montgomery))
- X-Men: The Last Stand (Callisto (Dania Ramirez))

==== Animation ====
- Appleseed Alpha (Deunan Knute)
- Barbie: The Princess & the Popstar (Keira)
- The Book of Life (María Posada-Sánchez)
- Groove Squad (Ping)
- Inside Out (Disgust)
- Inside Out 2 (Disgust)
- Penguins of Madagascar (Eva)
- Tron: Uprising (Quorra)
