= Persona 3 The Movie: No. 1, Spring of Birth =

2013 animated film

Persona 3 The Movie: #1 Spring of Birth
- Theatrical release poster. Right caption reads, "The end of everything begins..."
- Directed by: Noriaki Akitaya; Tomohisa Taguchi (Note: Series Unit Director (シリーズ演出))
- Written by: Jun Kumagai
- Story by: Atlus
- Based on: Persona 3 by Atlus
- Produced by: Kazuki Adachi; Yoshikazu Tanaka; Osamu Hosokawa; Akimichi Tsugawa; Kozue Kananiwa
- Starring: Akira Ishida; Megumi Toyoguchi; Kōsuke Toriumi; Rie Tanaka; Hikaru Midorikawa; Mamiko Noto; Kazuya Nakai; Isamu Tanonaka; Miyuki Sawashiro
- Edited by: Takashi Sakurai
- Music by: Shoji Meguro
- Production company: AIC ASTA
- Distributed by: Aniplex
- Release date: November 23, 2013
- Running time: 98 minutes
- Country: Japan
- Language: Japanese
- Box office: ¥201,886,754; (US$1,956,267)

Persona 3 The Movie: #1 Spring of Birth (劇場版「ペルソナ3」第１章, Gekijōban Perusona 3 Dai Ichi Shō) is a 2013 Japanese animated film produced by AIC ASTA and distributed by Aniplex. It is the first installment in a film series adapting the role-playing video game Persona 3, originally developed and published in 2006 by Atlus. Directed by Noriaki Akitaya and written by Jun Kumagai, it derives from Persona 3's main story campaign (retroactively dubbed The Journey in Persona 3 FES) from the male protagonist's perspective. It stars voice actors Akira Ishida, Megumi Toyoguchi, Kōsuke Toriumi, Rie Tanaka, Hikaru Midorikawa and Mamiko Noto. Set in 2009, the film follows the exploits of transfer student Makoto Yuki who, upon moving to Iwatodai City, discovers the Shadow creatures which feed on human psyche during the Dark Hour midnight phenomenon. After awakening to an ability called the Persona, Makoto finds himself intertwined in the battle against the Shadows with his new schoolmates.

Development of the film was first announced in a teaser trailer during the limited theatrical release of Persona 4 The Animation: The Factor of Hope on June 9, 2012. Aniplex later announced a Fall 2013 release date and that the main voice acting cast of the original PlayStation 2 game would reprise their roles in the film. The committee that was involved in Persona 4: The Animation was selected for the film and included music composer Shoji Meguro and supervisor Seiji Kishi, both veterans in works of the Megami Tensei franchise. The film was animated by AIC ASTA. The characterization of Makoto Yuki was noted as being particularly difficult during production due to his concept in the original game.

A promotional campaign was launched by Aniplex which also included the release of trailers and merchandise by making use of various mechanisms of the Persona 3 game as they applied to the real world. The film premiered at Tokyo's Shinjuku Wald 9 cinema on November 16, 2013 followed by its release across Japan on November 23, 2013. It made a gross earning of over US$1.9 million at the end of 2013. Critics praised the animation techniques used in the film with focus on its dark visual style. However it was described as being a simple and straightforward movie which lacked a suitable sense of closure. The film was released in Japan on Blu-ray and DVD editions on May 14, 2014, and internationally on imported editions on May 20, 2014. A sequel titled Persona 3 The Movie: #2 Midsummer Knight's Dream was released on June 7, 2014.

== Plot ==
Arriving in Iwatodai, High school student Makoto Yuki witnesses a strange phenomenon grip the city—shutting down all forms of technology and causing humans to become encased in coffins. Makoto makes his way to the Iwatodai Dormitory where a mysterious boy greets him with a contract after which he meets fellow dormmates, Yukari Takeba and Mitsuru Kirijo. The next day, Makoto enrolls at Gekkoukan High School as a second-year with Yukari and fellow classmate Junpei Iori. Afterwards the school's Chairman of the board, Shuji Ikutsuki, asks Yukari to investigate Makoto due to his uncanny characteristics which hint at his "potential" and coincidental circumstances involving the death of his parents during an accident in the city some ten years previous. Meanwhile Makoto finds himself in a place called the "Velvet Room" and becomes acquainted with its master, Igor and his assistant Elizabeth. During the midnight phenomenon, Akihiko Sanada rushes back to the dorm just as it comes under the attack of a swarm of monstrous creatures. Yukari grabs Makoto and flees to the roof. However they are cornered by a giant creature, and Makoto awakens to the power of two Personas to defeat the foes.

After having been unconscious for over a week, Makoto awakens in the hospital to find Yukari, who explains their similarity in having both lost parents during the accident in the past. Ikutsuki, Akihiko and Mitsuru recruit Makoto to the Specialized Extracurricular Execution Squad—SEES to help them fight the Shadow creatures responsible for the Apathy Syndrome by preying on humans during the Dark Hour midnight phenomenon. Not long after as Junpei also joins SEES, Akihiko deduces that they have enough members to begin exploring their school's Dark Hour form, a Shadow-infested labyrinth called Tartarus, where they hope to unearth the mystery of the Dark Hour. Makoto also befriends Fuuka Yamagishi and learns of her strained relationship with class bully, Natsuki Moriyama.

On another full moon, Mitsuru detects an abnormally large Shadow presence aboard a train and deploys Makoto, Yukari and Junpei to investigate. However, the trio are ambushed by the Shadows just as the train begins accelerating. Junpei charges ahead and encounters the Priestess Arcana which overwhelms him. As the train nears an inevitable collision, Makoto defeats the Priestess with Junpei, before stopping the runaway train.

Yukari, Junpei and Makoto go looking for answers from the delinquents behind Port Island Station and learn from Shinjiro Aragaki that the girls had been bullying Fuuka before the latter disappeared that same night. Natsuki confesses to Mitsuru that she and her friends had locked Fuuka inside the school's gymnasium. However, when her friends went to check on Fuuka that same night, she had mysteriously vanished while the latter developed the Apathy cases after being preyed on by Shadows. That night the SEES members deduce that Fuuka may be trapped inside Tartarus and plan to rescue her. Mitsuru elects him to protect Natsuki at the dorm where he listens to Natsuki's reasoning for bullying Fuuka and relates that Fuuka genuinely considers her as a friend.

Afterwards, the SEES members break into the school and find Fuuka inside Tartarus when the Dark Hour strikes. Mitsuru and Yukari come under attack by the Emperor and Empress Arcanas at Tartarus' entrance. Junpei, Akihiko and Fuuka rush to their aid however the Arcanas easily overwhelm all of their Personas. In the midst of the battle, Fuuka also awakens a Persona, Lucia, to defend an entranced Natsuki. With everyone approaching their physical limits, Fuuka uses Lucia to sense the Arcanas' weaknesses and coordinates the SEES members in a collaborative effort which results in the Shadows' defeat. A few days later, Fuuka moves into the Iwatodai dorm and repairs her relations with Natsuki, while life returns to a level of normalcy.

In a post-credits scene, the mysterious boy appears to Makoto and introduces himself as Pharos. Meanwhile, at an undisclosed location, a girl awakens from a slumber.

== Cast ==
=== Main ===
- Akira Ishida as:

- Makoto Yuki / Protagonist:
Having lost his parents in a tragic accident at an early age, Makoto began living in the suburbs with his relatives. In the Spring of April 2009 he returns to Iwatodai City after having lived there ten years previously, and moves into the Iwatodai Dormitory upon enrolling at Gekkoukan High School. However he soon finds life is not as normal as he was expecting when he awakens to a mysterious power called "Persona" and becomes intertwined in a struggle against monsters called "Shadows" whilst simultaneously delving into the mystery that shrouds Iwatodai City. He possesses an ability known as the "Wild Card" which enables him to wield multiple Personas, although his main Persona is Orpheus. Ishida stated that he was quite surprised when he learned of the movie adaptation since a considerable amount of time had passed since its [Persona 3] release. He further noted that he had enjoyed recording the scene of Makoto's initial meeting with Pharos, since he was presented with the roles of both characters.

- Pharos:
A mysterious boy who appears to Makoto upon arrival at the Iwatodai Dormitory and presents him with a contract. He is usually dressed in black and white striped clothing. Akira Ishida also provided the voice of Pharos and was fond of recording the interaction between both of his characters.

- Megumi Toyoguchi as Yukari Takeba:

Yukari is a sophomore at Gekkoukan High School and a classmate and dormmate of Makoto at the Iwatodai Dormitory. In the past, Yukari lost her father in a tragic incident and enrolled at Gekkoukan High in order to investigate the details surrounding his death. She is a member of the Specialized Extracurricular Execution Squad. Her Persona is Io. Toyoguchi described her character as being an honest "straight shooter" and enjoyed voicing Yukari's scenes with Makoto. Director Noriyaki Akitaya stated that Yukari was his favorite character and jokingly hinted at a romance between her and Makoto in future films.

- Kōsuke Toriumi as Junpei Iori:

Junpei is a rather upbeat sophomore at Gekkoukan High School who loves cracking jokes. He resides in the same class with Makoto and Yukari and relates to Makoto since being a transfer student himself. Junpei has a habit of charging headfirst into situations without much thought for the consequences of his actions. He develops a rivalry with Makoto despite sharing a close bond with him. Junpei's Persona is Hermes. Toriumi stated that since his character was the same role given to him in the Persona 3 game, he had not changed much of his voice mechanics. He also credited the script for having a "well summarized storyline of the game" and was further impressed by how well the film's depictions of social life and battling were balanced together.

- Rie Tanaka as Mitsuru Kirijo:

Mitsuru is a third-year student at Gekkoukan High School where her popularity amongst the student body gained her the position of Student Council President. She is heir to the Kirijo Group, a multinational corporation which built Tatsumi Port Island and sponsors Gekkoukan High School. Mitsuru awakened to the power of Persona at a young age and is the founder of the Specialized Extracurricular Execution Squad. Her Persona is Penthesilea. Tanaka described her character as a strong lead female because of her [Mitsuru] exceptional leadership skills and feminine dignity. Tanaka also described the Persona summoning scenes as being quite enjoyable.

- Hikaru Midorikawa as Akihiko Sanada:

Akihiko is a third year student at Gekkoukan High School and resident at the Iwatodai Dormitory. He had been friends with Mitsuru since middle school and upon learning of the Shadows, he too awakened to the power of Persona and joined her cause. Belonging to the boxing team at Gekkoukan High, Akihiko is constantly training to become a stronger fighter. His Persona is Polydeuces. Midorikawa noted that the Persona summoning scenes were his favorite. Midorikawa's co-cast members from the Digital Devil Saga video game were also featured for the supporting cast of the film.

- Mamiko Noto as Fuuka Yamagishi:

Sophomore at Gekkoukan High School. Her quiet and gentle personality coupled with a rather weak-looking appearance made her fall victim to constant bullying from her classmates. Her Persona is Lucia. Noto stated that the film brings with it the theme of comradery amongst friends working together for a common cause and cited the battle scenes as being "powerful". Noto was also interested in the interaction between Fuuka and Natsuki although she did not elaborate further on this.

- Kazuya Nakai as Shinjiro Aragaki:

Ex-third year Gekkoukan High student and SEES member, who dropped out of both for his own reasons. He is old friends with Akihiko and Mitsuru, but tends to keep their relationship at arm's length. Nakai was initially surprised at the timing of the film in relation to the release of the game [Persona 3] but noted that the film's story kept true to the game. Nakai also expressed interest in the relationship between the characters Fūuka and Natsuki.

- Isamu Tanonaka as Igor:

Master of the Velvet Room, a place which exists in the realm between dreams and reality. Due to Tanonaka's death in 2010, archived audio recordings of his role as "Igor" in the Persona 3 game are used for the film. He was credited as giving a special performance.

- Miyuki Sawashiro as Elizabeth:

Igor's aide in the Velvet Room. She is usually dressed as an elevator attendant and carries around a book known as the "Persona Compendium". Sawashiro described her scenes with Igor as deeply "nostalgic and sad" but was happy to once again reprise her role as Elizabeth from the game. She fondly described "the funky disco" [Club Escapade] as her favorite place in the Persona 3 world, although stated that "it is not depicted in the film".

=== Supporting ===
- Hideyuki Hori as Shuji Ikutsuki:

Chairman of the board committee at Gekkoukan High School and club adviser to the Specialized Extracurricular Execution Squad. Hori, along with his fellow cast members from Digital Devil Saga and the Persona 3 Drama CDs, reprised their characters in the film.

- Atsumi Tanezaki as Natsuki Moriyama:

A girl at Gekkoukan High School who bullies Fuuka. A few of the actors drew significance in the relationship established between the characters Natsuki and Fuuka.

- Yuka Komatsu as Isako Toriumi:

The homeroom teacher of class 2F at Gekkoukan High School.

- Hiroaki Miura as Hidetoshi Odagiri:

He is the rather strict student council vice-president of Gekkoukan High with a zero tolerance policy on rule breaking. Miura reprised his role in the film from the Persona 3 Drama CDs along with his fellow cast members from Digital Devil Saga.

- Kenji Nojima as Kenji Tomochika:

A student of class 2F who befriends Makoto. Nojima reprised his role from the Persona 3 Drama CDs along with his fellow cast members from Digital Devil Saga.

== Production ==
=== Development ===
Persona 3 The Movie: #1 Spring of Birth was animated by AIC ASTA. The main staff consisted of the same people behind Persona 4: The Animation along with a few modifications. The film was directed by Noriaki Akitaya, following his directional work on the Bakuman and Code Geass anime series. Akitaya remarked that he had 'jumped' onto the idea of the film adaptation ever since he was included in talks due to his love of games created by Atlus. He described the game as something which gave fans direct input in the events which take place and hence made it a goal to help them enjoy the adaptation as much as possible from their perspective of only being able to view the film.

"I believe that Persona 3's charm lies within the coolness of the characters, more than anything. We pride ourselves in having made a movie that might just make you want to play the game after watching it..."

— Noriaki Akitaya, director

Seiji Kishi, a veteran director of the Megami Tensei franchise was approached to supervise the overall production process and hence brought his experience from directing the anime adaptations of two well known games in the franchise — Persona 4 and Devil Survivor 2. Kishi had proposed a new "visual combat system" to be employed in the film rather than the one used for Persona 4: The Animation since he felt that the darker themes of Persona 3 required such a change.

At the same time, script writer Jun Kumagai, had nothing but praise for the Persona 3 game and stated that "the original game is a masterpiece which can be called the innovation of RPG". Kumagai had also expressed his hope that the screenplay would be compelling both to fans of the game and those new to the Persona series. From the visual perspective, the original character designs of the game were completely revamped for the film by animation director Keisuke Watabe, who retained the characters' likeness. The various Personas and Shadows were designed by Kyouma Aki while art direction was handled by Toshihiro Kohama. Kaoru Aoki aided with the art designs while Junpei Takatsu was in charge of the visual designs. Saori Goda held the position of color coordination while Shinobu Tsuneki designed the film's props. Other staff directors included the executive animation directors Akiko Asaki and Mizuka Takahashi, action director Ryo Tanaka and composite director Hideki Imaizumi. Finally, Takashi Sakurai served as the film's editor.

==== Characterization of Makoto Yuki ====
In a Famitsu interview, Akitaya explained that one of his biggest challenges was, "getting the protagonist, who is the [human-controlled] 'player' in the game, and making him into a character named Makoto Yuki for the film, then figuring out how to integrate him [Makoto] into the story." Akitaya went about constructing Makoto's character with extreme care in terms of speech, gestures and behavior all the while staying true to what was already established in the game. Akitaya admitted that he would not have been able to meet the expectations of the individual fans of the game since they were able to choose their own unique name and personality for the Protagonist. He instead incorporated the most general traits of the Protagonist from fan reaction to form Yuki's character. Akitaya had joked that during initial pre-production the Protagonist's name was still not determined and had proposed the placeholder, "Tsukitarō Yamada" (山田 月太郎, Yamada Tsukitarō) until the first draft was developed. However even as Kumagai began working on the script, the placeholder went unchanged for the next four to five months and Akitaya found himself growing steadily attached despite eventually changing it. Akitaya stated that his favorite scene in the film occurred when Makoto summoned his Persona for the first time. He elaborated that Makoto's maniacal laugh helped give depth to the scene and establish Watabe's character designs as being one of the film's main attractions.

=== Music ===
Persona 3 The Movie: #1 Spring of Birth

Soundtrack album by Shoji Meguro
- Released: May 14, 2014
- Length: 26:40
- Label: Aniplex

The soundtrack for #1 Spring of Birth was written by original Persona 3 composer Shoji Meguro, while sound director Satoki Iida helped with the track arrangement and selection. Meguro was initially thrilled at being selected as the film's musical composer, and remarked that its soundtrack would be his twelfth work for the Megami Tensei franchise. Meguro described the user interface of the Persona 3 game as having a "fancy atmosphere" which compelled him to create its unique pop-like soundtrack. However he felt that he needed to give the film's songs a deeper feeling and hence utilized string instruments to create such an effect.

The first music compilation titled "Persona 3 The Movie #1 Spring of Birth Theme Song" was released by Aniplex on October 2, 2013. The disc features "More Than One Heart" by Yumi Kawamura which was used as the main theme song for the film. Kawamura had previously been the vocal contributor of many of the songs produced for the Persona 3 video game. She also provided the vocals for the "Spring of Birth" version of Persona 3's "Burn My Dread" theme song, which also made its debut on the disc. The film's original soundtrack was released together with the Blu-ray on May 14, 2014.

Persona 3 The Movie #1 Spring of Birth Theme Song CD
No.	Title	Lyrics	Vocalist	Length
1.	"More Than One Heart"	Benjamin Franklin	Yumi Kawamura	05:11
2.	"Burn My Dread -Spring of Birth ver-."	Shigeo Komori, Yoshihiro Komori	Yumi Kawamura	03:22
3.	"More Than One Heart (instrumental)"			05:11
4.	"Burn My Dread -Spring of Birth ver.- (instrumental)"			03:22
Total length:				17:06

Persona 3 The Movie #1 Spring of Birth Original Soundtrack
No.	Title	Lyrics	Vocalist	Length
1.	"Daily Life"			01:15
2.	"Unquiet"			00:31
3.	"Magician"			01:51
4.	"Protean"			01:18
5.	"Regret"			00:50
6.	"Persona Summoners"			02:05
7.	"(友達だから)"			01:40
8.	"Infinity Possible"			01:48
9.	"Guess the Incident"			01:26
10.	"Sense of Isolation"			01:22
11.	"all of the full moon"			02:04
12.	"Pure One Heart"			01:58
13.	"For Life"			03:15
14.	"More Than One Heart"	Benjamin Franklin	Yumi Kawamura	05:10
Total length:				26:40

== Marketing ==
=== Previews ===
The Persona 3 The Movie project was first revealed during a thirty second post-credits teaser trailer at the end of the limited theatrical release of the Persona 4 The Animation: The Factor of Hope feature film during its screening in Japan on June 9, 2012. The teaser noted that the project had been green lit for production. Featured in the teaser was the Persona 3 Protagonist holding an "Evoker" (a unique game mechanic of summoning a "Persona") to his head and pulling the trigger, all showcased in Japanese-style 2D animation. This left some speculation amongst the media as to whether the project would be an anime film or otherwise since at the time this was left to ambiguity. Following later confirmation of the project's animated theatrical nature, a slightly altered fifteen-second version of the teaser was streamed online.

The first official trailer saw its release on March 27, 2013 and showcased a clock striking midnight which established the film's key plot devices including the Dark Hour phenomenon, the primary antagonists — the Shadows and the main protagonist summoning his Persona, Orpheus. When the second trailer was released on July 22, 2013, it was also the first to feature dialogue as well as the main theme song for the film, titled "More Than One Heart" by Yumi Kawamura. The third trailer was released on October 19, 2013 and introduced the Tartarus tower along with designs of the signature weapons used by each individual character. A reporter at Kotaku described the animation as "gorgeous" and felt as though the movie reflected the game's [Persona 3] cut-scenes. The fourth and final trailer was released on November 18, 2013 and was the lengthiest of its predecessors. It showcased new footage including the characters Igor and Elizabeth in the Velvet Room, more use of the Evokers, a bit of Makoto Yuki's back story (in flashbacks) along with new dialogue. At the end of the trailer, a reference alluding to Makoto's ambivalence is made by the character Junpei Iori who asks, "I wonder... Just why is he [Makoto] fighting?" — a trait later mentioned by film critics. The last trailer was also streamed every midnight outside Alta Studio Co. Ltd. in East Shinjuku until November 25, 2013.

An advanced sneak peek screening of Persona 3 The Movie: #1 Spring of Birth was held at the Shinjuku Wald 9 cinema in Shinjuku, Tokyo on November 16, 2013. Akira Ishida, Megumi Toyoguchi and Kōsuke Toriumi participated in special talk show at the event to highlight some of the film's features before its screening. The actors talked about the production process for the film. For instance, Toyoguchi stated that their roles were recorded around Spring 2013. Toriumi, the voice of 'Junpei Iori', explained how passage of time between the release of the Persona 3 game and the film affected his role since his present voice sounded more akin to an adult. However Satoki Iida had requested that he try to make himself sound younger for his character. Toyoguchi also joked that many of the 2006-era items were held true in the film, such as the use of Cathode ray tube TVs and mobile phones. A Q&A Twitter session was also part of the show during which the Protagonist's characterization was questioned by fans and answered by producer, Kazuki Adachi.

=== Promotion ===
The official website and Twitter account for the project were both launched on July 3, 2012 and confirmed the Persona 3: The Movie project's theatrical nature. The July 3 launch was scheduled so as to pay homage to the use of two major plot mechanics in the Persona 3 video game — namely the midnight Dark Hour phenomenon as well as correlation to the lunar phases with respect to the calendar full moon whereby an exceptionally powerful Shadow would appear on the night of its occurrence. This tactic was henceforth utilized by Aniplex to mark succeeding updates regarding the project and also aided by the Twitter account which updated at select lunar occurrences thereafter. When the official website was launched it featured the simple ambiguous caption "Coming soon". This was later changed during the full moon of December 28, 2012 when the website showcased the first promotional image along with the line, "Persona 3 the Movie #1 2013 in theaters" — teasing a future film franchise. However word had yet to be announced on the number of planned films.

Three months later, during the full moon of March 27, 2013, the film project was confirmed to be a series of anime films and not just a single release — with the first film given the subtitle: "#1 Spring of Birth". This news came alongside the release of the first official trailer which also featured a list of the production staff and confirmed that the main voice acting cast of the original PlayStation 2 game would reprise their roles in the film. Almost four months later, at midnight during the full moon of July 22, 2013, the official website received a completely revamped design with the announcement that November 23, 2013 would be film's official release date. This came alongside a list of 26 theaters throughout Japan which would screen the film during its opening weekend. Almost a month later during the full moon of August 21, 2013 at 12:00 am JST a minor update was released which detailed the track-list for the film's official music CD release titled "Persona 3 The Movie #1 Spring of Birth Theme Song CD". Aniplex soon began releasing updates at an accelerated pace as the film's premiere date drew closer. For instance the next minor update was released during the new moon of September 5, 2013 which announced that the 2011 anime series: Persona 4: The Animation would begin re-airing on Tokyo MX, GYT, GTV and BS11 as a follow-up to the film.

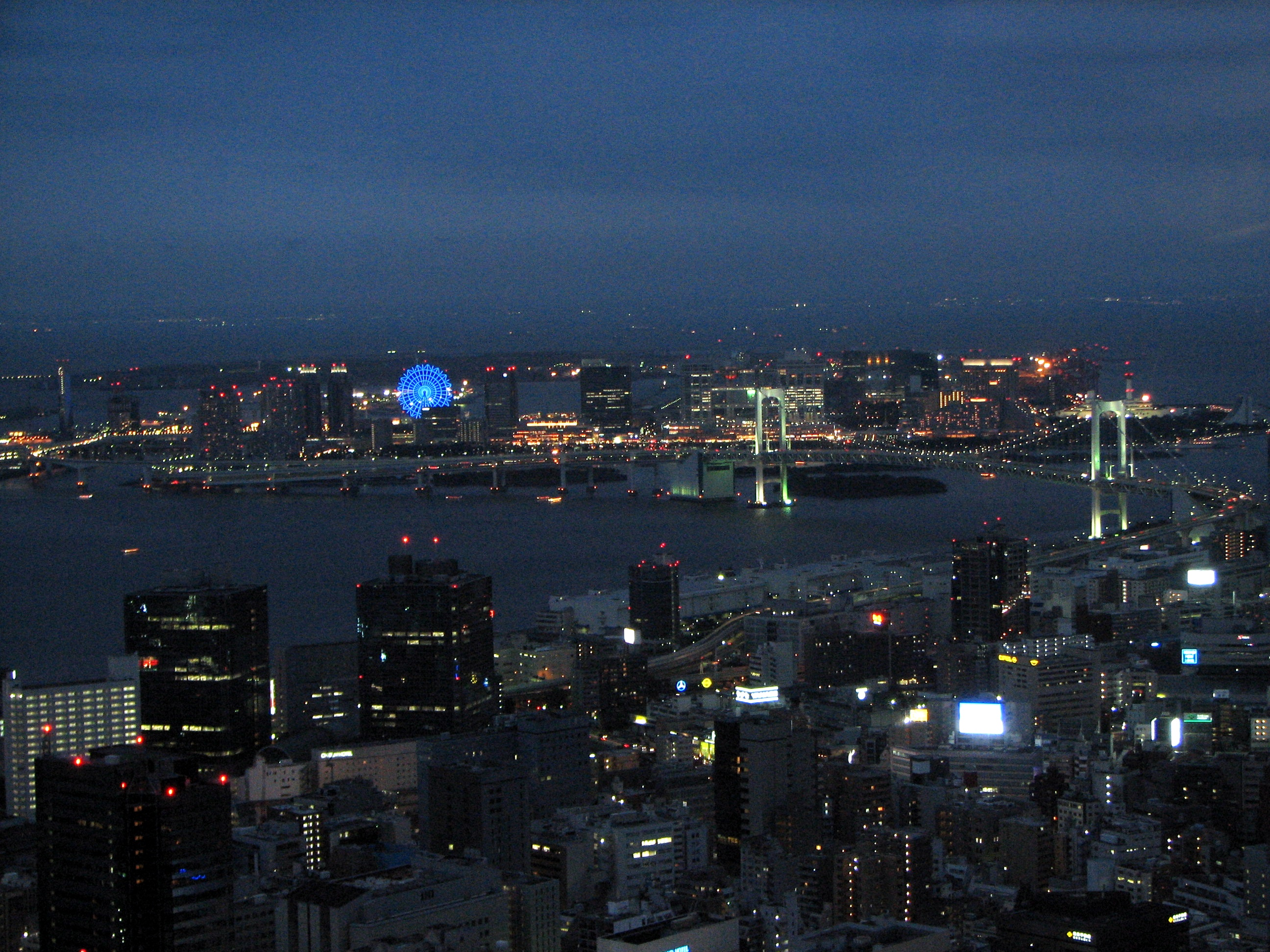
Persona 3 themed railcards were sold at the train stations around the artificial Odaiba island area to promote the film.

A couple weeks later and during the full moon of September 19, 2013 an update was released which revealed limited edition railcards featuring promotional images of the film. The cards were scheduled to go on sale at the Shimbashi and Toyosu train stations between October 1 and 31, 2013. They granted a bearer access to the New Transit Yurikamome train which connects to the artificial island of Odaiba in Tokyo Bay between Minato and Kōtō in Tokyo.

An animated feature was broadcast on Tokyo MX during the airing of Disco Train at noon on October 13, 2013. The segment paid homage to a shopping infomercial titled "Tanaka's Amazing Commodities", an event usually triggered on Sundays in the Persona 3 game. The program featured the Persona 3 character President Tanaka, advertising the ticket bundle for the "Persona 3 The Movie Theme Song CD" set. An official website for Tanaka's in-game company — Jika Net was also set up for a limited time to accept pre-orders of the set which included an exclusive bonus sticker. The website also featured other products obtainable in the Persona 3 game but were all listed as "sold out".

Another update was released during the full moon of October 19, 2013 and included the third movie trailer along with a host of new artwork. A dynamic lunar calendar of the same design used in the Persona 3 game was also added to the main page of the official website and began featuring new artwork on a daily basis — some of which included production storyboards. It was also announced that a Persona 3-themed "mystery event" would take place at the Odaiba VenusFort from November 23 - December 1, 2013. Known as the "Persona3 The Movie #1 Spring of Birth x Nazomate", the interactive event was set up by Nazomate and required participants to role-play as a resident of the Iwatodai Dormitory just as it comes under the attack of a Shadow. The participants needed to awaken their Personas and take a test to become a member of the Specialized Extracurricular Execution Squad. Those who were able to complete the event were awarded with a randomly chosen exclusive Nazomate Character Card featuring the film's main characters. Those who failed were given another card featuring the character "Elizabeth" as proof of participation. In addition, other merchandise was made available for purchase at the event. An exclusive store Persona-themed store was also opened at the Marui department store's "Space ONE" area in Shinjuku, Tokyo from November 21, 2013 to December 15, 2013.

One week before the film's release and during the full moon of November 17, 2013, different cast members began posting their autographs on the official website once per day. This was also accompanied by special digital wallpapers released in the same manner which featured the film's main characters.

=== Merchandising ===
Aniplex began distributing official movie merchandise during the 2013 Anime Contents Expo event at the Makuhari Messe convention center on March 30–31. Along with screening the film's first teaser, a dish sold at the Hagakure ramen restaurant in the Persona 3 game called the "Hidden Leaf Bowl" was made available at the food area of the event. Almost four months later on July 22, 2013, Aniplex launched phase one of a special ticket promotion whereby movie-goers who pre-ordered early tickets between August 10 and September 20, 2013 would receive special collectable folders containing leaflets which sported depictions of the characters Makoto Yuki, Yukari Takeba and, Junpei Iori along with their respective Personas chosen at random. The second phase of the promotion was continued on September 5, 2013 and in the same manner, special folders and leaflets were given to those who pre-ordered early tickets between September 21 and late October 2013—this time featuring the characters Mitsuru Kirijo, Akihiko Sanada and, Fuuka Yamagishi along with their respective Personas. The third phase of the promotion allowed movie-goers access to a promotional poster with purchase of a ticket between the period of October 26 - November 22, 2013.

Animate and Gamers stores began their first wave of merchandise distribution between July 23 - September 26, 2013 whereby an A3 Metal Poster was sold in a bundle with an advance movie ticket. The second wave of distribution began on November 2, 2013 and in the same manner, included rubber mascots featuring the characters Makoto Yūki and Elizabeth. Happy-Kuji also revealed a lottery contest on August 21, 2013 which officially began on September 21, 2013. Official movie merchandise, consisting of mostly figurines were offered as prizes for the contest. During the film's first three weeks of release in Japan, special Persona 3 themed Bikkuriman stickers were given out to movie goers. Each patron received one sticker at random out of the 29-piece set called "Super PS3 Seals". The sticker artwork was illustrated by Minoru Yonezawa and Satoshi Hyodo of Green House Co. Ltd. Yonezawa remarked that he had not known of the [Persona] game series until he was approached by Aniplex for commissioning — rather only being aware of the original Megami Tensei games. Due to his unfamiliarity with the series Yonezawa (and Hyodo) found difficulty in deforming the characters. They also drew the design of the special "Tanaka" sticker given to those who placed orders on the Jika Net website. A host of other Persona 3-themed merchandise and accessories were also released to help promote the film.

== Other media ==
=== Drama CD ===
Aniplex launched a limited edition drama CD at the 84th bi-annual Japanese Comiket event on August 10, 2013 at the Tokyo International Exhibition Center. Sales of the CD continued at the Persona Music FES Concert at the Nippon Budokan on August 13, 2013. However limited quantities quickly sold out due to its popularity at both events. Due to high demand, the disc was later made available for mail-order purchase on Aniplex's Plus webstore. The CD features the characters Mitsuru Kirijo, Akihiko Sanada and Shinjiro Aragaki in a side story titled "Seaside Vacation before Death's Scythe" which took place during the year 2008 and before the events of the film.

=== Publications ===
Two promotional booklets were released in Japan in the months before the film's release. The first was aimed primarily to those unfamiliar with the Persona 3 story and titled "Persona 3 The Movie Quick Start Guide. It was freely distributed at the 84th bi-annual Japanese Comiket event on August 10, 2013. The second booklet was titled "Persona 3 The Movie Contact Book". This one was distributed at the Tokyo Game Show event held at the Makuhari Messe on September 28, 2013.

An official art book was scheduled to be released for sale by the Famima convenience stores in Japan on August 24, 2013 but the date was pushed back to September 21, 2013. The book contained a cel shaded image and included a general admission movie ticket.

== Release ==
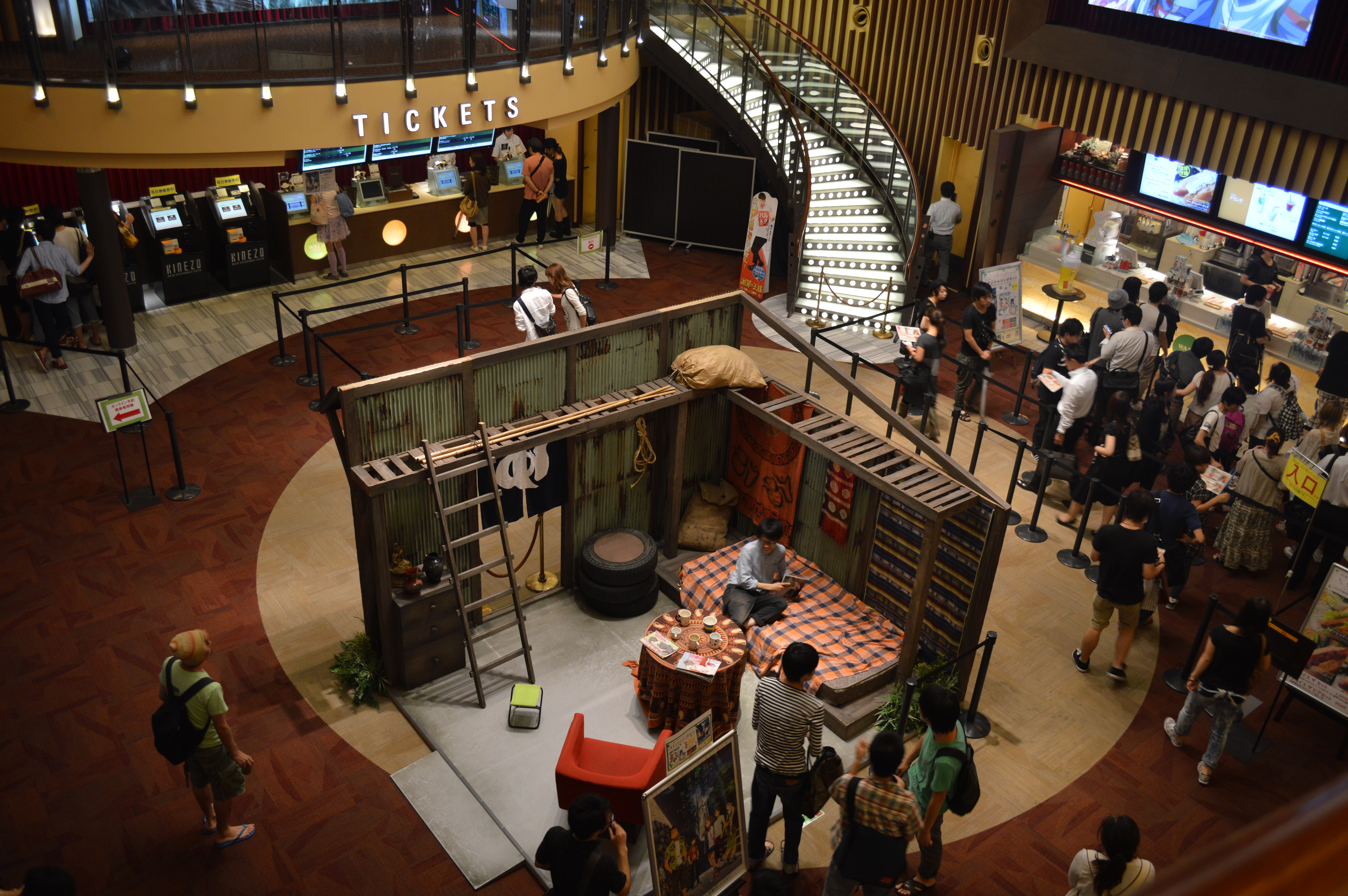
There was a higher than expected ratio of female to male movie-goers during the film's November 23 release in Shinjuku Wald 9.

The entire film received an advanced midnight screening on November 16, 2013 at the Shinjuku Wald 9 cinema in Shinjuku, Tokyo ahead of its November 23 release. During its release weekend, the film mostly attracted a young audience ranging from teenagers to those in their early thirties. Among this demographic, males were outnumbered by females at a ratio of 2:3 which suggested that the original game itself was mostly popular among women. In addition a significant number of patrons who were not familiar with the game were also present during the release weekend. but the film was faced with mix reviews at release tho

=== Box office ===
Persona 3 The Movie: #1 Spring of Birth sold 39,963 tickets across 26 theaters in Japan during its November 23 opening weekend and earned ¥60,912,300 (US$599,000), making its debut at 7th in Japan as compared to The Tale of Princess Kaguya which placed 1st and grossed ¥284,252,550 (US$2.8 million) from 222,822 tickets across 456 theaters during the same weekend. During its second November 30 weekend, the film earned ¥30,569,795 (US$297,053). The film eventually made a gross earning of US$1,956,267 and was ranked at 118 in Japan at the end of 2013 by Box Office Mojo.

=== Reception ===
Richard Eisenbeis of Kotaku described Makoto Yuki as being an initially "ambivalent, broken character" and added that the character's growth took center stage in the film. He also remarked that the film could have "been a very dark, difficult-to-see movie" since the majority of it takes place at night but praised the lighting effects and contrasts which rendered the action easily visible while creating a "visual style all its own". On the flip side, Eisenbeis explained that while the movie covers only the very beginning of the Persona 3 story, there was "the unfortunate side effect of a good chunk of the main cast and the majority of the antagonists not even being in the movie." Adding that since none of the game's key plot twists are reached, he felt that it was "a very simple, straight-forward movie." Eisenbeis also noted that the film had "more images of teen suicide than you can shake a stick at". The "Evokers" which in the Persona 3 world allowed the characters to summon Personas by putting one to their heads and pulling the trigger, were likened to guns in this context. Despite not being actual weapons, Eisenbeis stated that "it still looks like they are blowing their brains out — often complete with spiritual brain and skull fragments."

Elliot Gay of Japanator elaborated on the challenges that could have been faced in adapting a 50- to 80-hour RPG into a 90-minute film but praised its admirable job at pacing albeit a few issues. He noted that one such example was with as with the introduction of the Tartarus Tower which he felt was "rushed and somewhat under-explained". Gay also noted that the film "suffers from not having a strong narrative through-line" and that there was no sense of closure since "nothing truly significant [took] place". He argued that this was as an "unavoidable side effect of adapting Persona 3". Like Eisenbeis though, Gay felt that Makoto's experiences ultimately result in his growth and that the subtitle Spring of Birth "refers to Makoto and the forward progress he makes as a person." Gay went on to praise the film's visuals, explaining that the "film captures the darker atmosphere of the game admirably." Overall, Gay described the film as delivering "a nostalgic trip down memory lane for longtime fans, and an accessible entry point for folks curious about the franchise."

=== Home media ===
Persona 3 The Movie: #1 Spring of Birth was released on Blu-ray and DVD in Japan on May 14, 2014 in both Limited and Normal Editions. The Limited Edition versions of the discs included the Director's Cut of the film with 7 minutes of previously unreleased footage. During the first week of the Limited Edition release in Japan, the Blu-ray version sold 23,514 copies while the DVD version sold 4,693 copies. Aniplex of America went on to release the film with English subtitles in North America and other select parts of the world on the imports of the Japanese Blu-ray editions on May 20, 2014. The imports were made available in Collector's and Standard Editions and included bonus features such as the original theatrical version of the film, trailers, commercials and audio commentary. Bonus merchandise including artwork, a sizable booklet and the film's Original Soundtrack were also included in the Collector's Edition. Both editions included the original theatrical and extended Director's Cut versions of the film.

=== Sequel ===
The film's post-credits sequence announced that a sequel titled Persona 3 The Movie: No. 2 would be "comming [sic] early summer 2014". It was later revealed on December 5, 2013 that the full title of the sequel would be Persona 3 The Movie: #2 Midsummer Knight's Dream.
