= Protagonist of Persona 3 =

Video game characters

- The protagonist's female and male designs, as seen in Persona 3 Portable
- First game: Persona 3 (2006)
- Designed by: Shigenori Soejima
- Portrayed by: Male: Shouta Aoi; Female: Kana Asumi
- Voiced by: Male: Akira Ishida (Japanese); Yuri Lowenthal (English, original) Aleks Le (English, Reload); Female: Marina Inoue (Japanese); Laura Bailey (English)

In-universe information
- Full name: Male: Makoto Yuki; Female: Kotone Shiomi
- Nationality: Japanese

The player-named protagonist (Japanese: 主人公, Hepburn: shujinkō) is a character from Persona 3, a 2006 role-playing video game developed by Atlus. In the game, the protagonist is an orphan who transfers to Gekkoukan High School in Iwatodai City and discovers a phenomenon called the Dark Hour during which supernatural entities called Shadows roam freely. After awakening an ability called Persona, the protagonist joins their classmates in forming the Specialized Extracurricular Execution Squad (S.E.E.S.), dedicated to eliminating the Dark Hour and the threat of the Shadows. In the original release of Persona 3 as well as the updated versions Persona 3 FES and Persona 3 Reload, the protagonist is male; for Persona 3 Portable, Atlus added the option to play as a female, to provide more options to returning players and attract a new female demographic.

Both protagonists were designed by Shigenori Soejima, who aimed to create ordinary youth who the player could relate to. The male protagonist’s voice is provided by Akira Ishida in Japanese, while in English, he is provided by Yuri Lowenthal in most media, and by Aleks Le in the game's remake, Persona 3 Reload. The female protagonist’s voice is provided in Japanese by Marina Inoue and in English by Laura Bailey, and the male and female protagonists are respectively portrayed by Shouta Aoi and Kana Asumi in the game's stage adaptation, Persona 3: The Weird Masquerade. The male protagonist's character was reworked for the four-part animated film adaptation, where director Noriaki Akitaya explained pressure in giving the silent character his own personality. He is canonically known as Makoto Yuki in the films as well as the 2023 remaster of Persona 3 Portable and Persona 3 Reload. In the manga adaptation, he is named Minato Arisato. In The Weird Masquerade, he is given the name Sakuya Shiomi, sharing a surname with his female counterpart as the female protagonist is given the name Kotone Shiomi, which was later reused as her canonical name in the 2023 remaster of Persona 3 Portable. Outside of Persona 3 Portable, the female protagonist also appears in Persona Q2: New Cinema Labyrinth, Puzzle & Dragons and Persona 5: The Phantom X. Critical reception for the character has been generally positive.

== Design and characterization ==
The Persona 3 protagonist was the first character Shigenori Soejima designed for the game. Early designs of the character made him look mature and collected since the artist viewed him as a "cliche[d] cool guy." Soejima took longer to design the protagonist than any other character as the game's other characters would be made to complement his design. In Art of Persona 3, Soejima remarked that "Initially, he looked more honest, like an ordinary, handsome young man. But, I worked to achieve greater ambiguity in his expression." He further noted that the character managed to have a "hidden coolness." In retrospect, he found that the character was not ambiguous enough and thus when creating the Persona 4 protagonist, Soejima made Yu Narukami with the idea that his entire personality be decided and portrayed by the player's in-game actions and decisions.

Director Noriaki Akitaya had faced a similar dilemma for his animated film version. He explained that one of his biggest challenges was, "...getting the protagonist, who is the player in the game, and making him into a character named Makoto Yuki for the film, then figuring out how to integrate him [the protagonist] into the story." This led Akitaya to be extremely careful about how he went about constructing the character in terms of his speech, gestures and behavior all the while staying true to what was already established in the game. Akitaya admitted that he would not have been able to meet the expectations of the individual fans of the game since they were able to choose their own unique name and personality for the protagonist. Instead Akitaya took the route of incorporating the most general traits of fan reactions to the protagonist to form Yuki's character.

Akitaya stated that his favorite scene in the film occurred when the protagonist summoned his Persona for the first time. He elaborated that the protagonist's maniacal laugh and heavy breathing helped bring depth to the scene and establish animation director Keisuke Watabe's character designs as being one of the main attractions of the film. Akitaya had joked that during initial pre-production the protagonist's name was still not determined and instead proposed the placeholder "Tsukitarō Yamada" (山田 月太郎, Yamada Tsukitarō) until the first draft was developed. However, even as Jun Kumagai began working on the screenplay, the placeholder went unchanged for the next four to five months and Akitaya found himself growing attached to it despite eventually changing it.

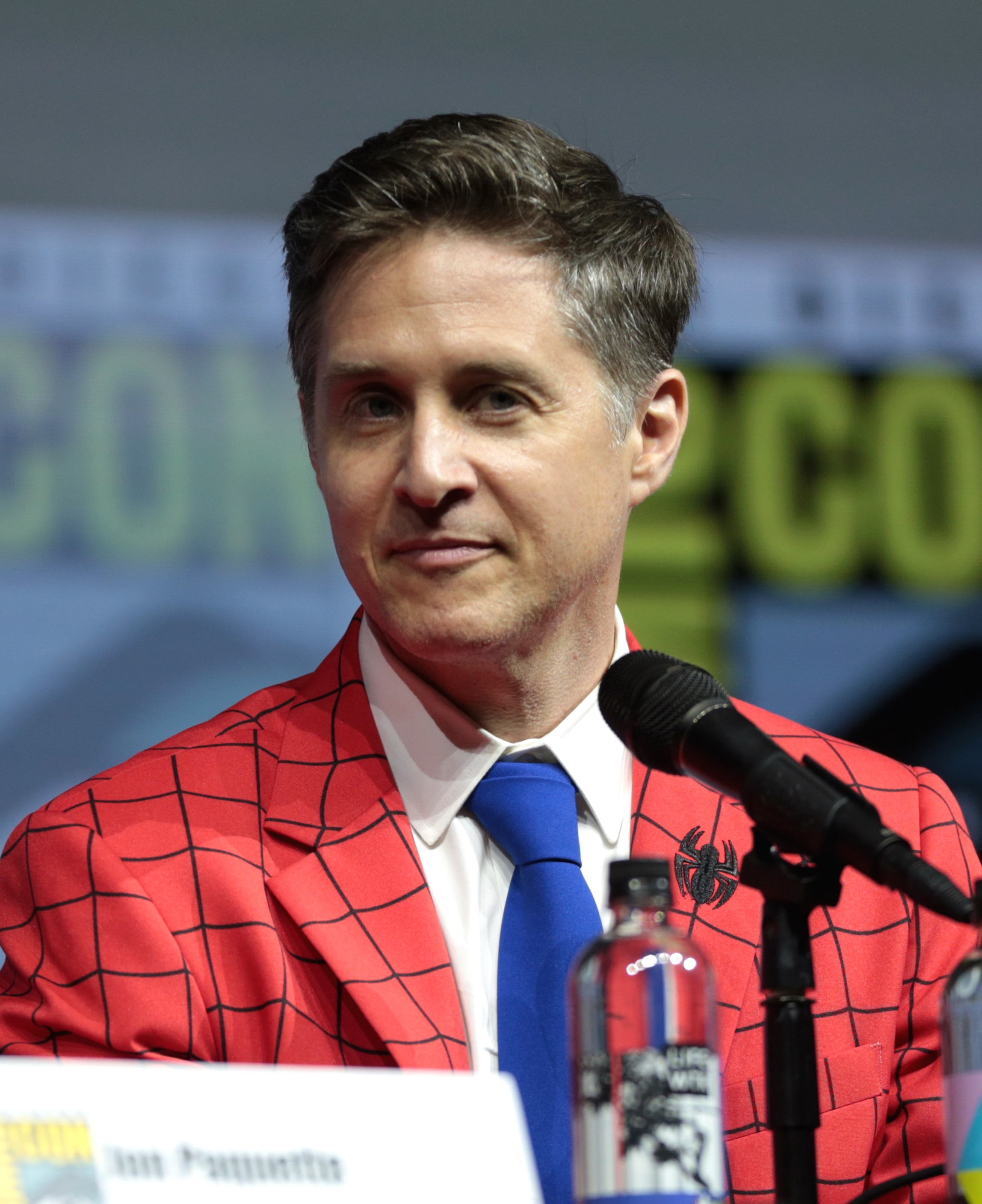
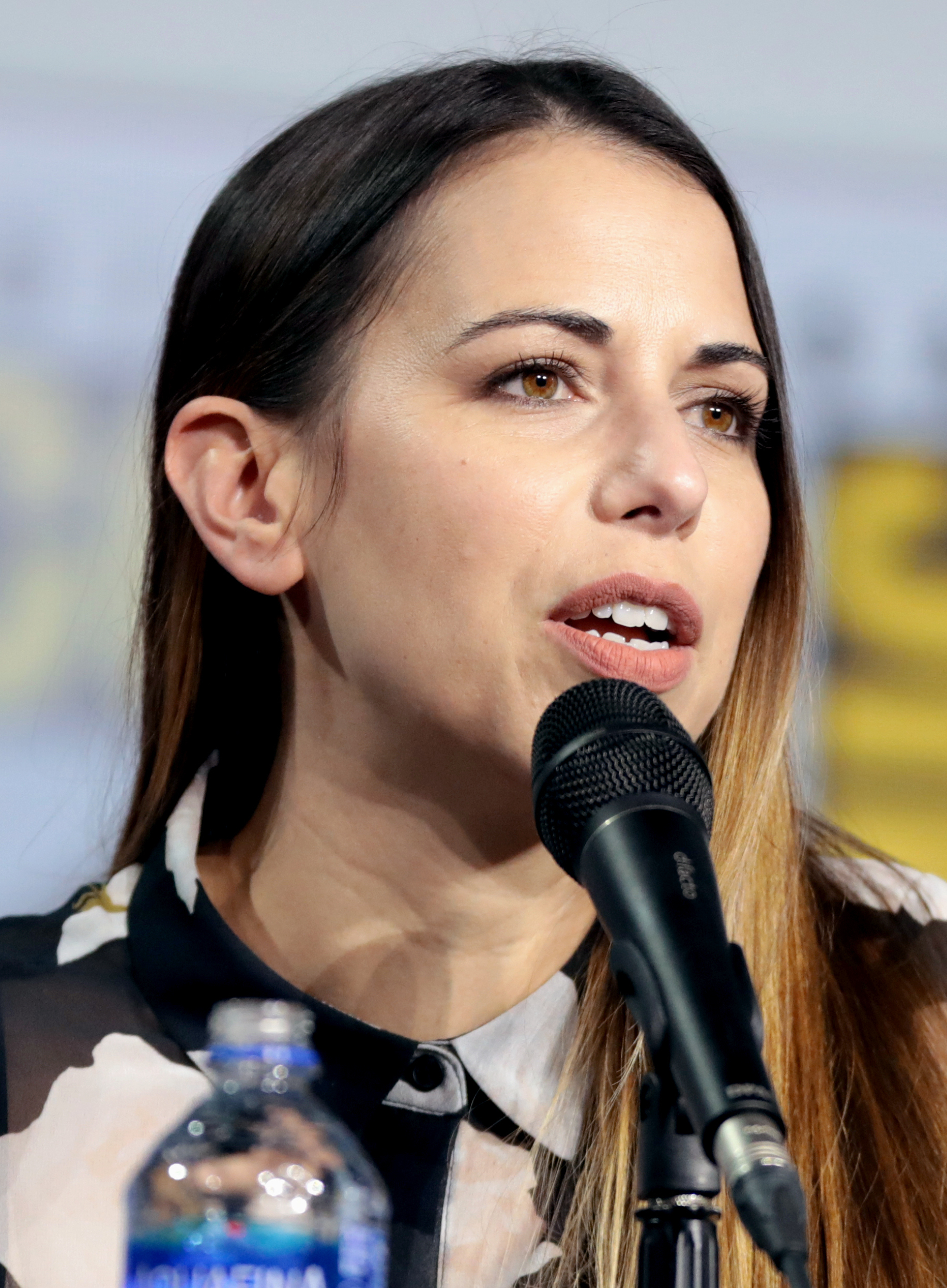
Yuri Lowenthal (left) voiced the protagonist in the English dub while Laura Bailey (right) voiced the female counterpart.

Akira Ishida voiced the protagonist in this Japanese adaptation. He noted that since he was presented with the roles of both Pharos and the protagonist, recording the scene of the protagonist's initial meeting with Pharos was something he enjoyed. In the English version of Persona 3 the role of both the protagonist and Ryoji is taken by Yuri Lowenthal. As with his previous role as protagonist of the Digital Devil Saga games, Lowenthal did not have extensive dialogue lines. His main task was shouting out the names of Personas: localization editor Yu Namba was initially worried about his performance, but Lowenthal managed to pronounce the names correctly. He attributed this to his love for Dungeons & Dragons.

Persona 3 Portable has the option to play as a female character. This selection alters some aspects of the story: the first Persona gained by the Protagonist, Orpheus, has a different appearance; Igor's assistant in the Velvet Room, Elizabeth, can be replaced with a male equivalent named Theodore. In making of this version of the protagonist, the staff aimed for a character whose new traits in comparison to the male would be new features for returning gamers as well as attract the female demographic. Designing her was challenging due to similarities with Rise Kujikawa and Mitsuru Kirijo. As result, the final design employs a less beautiful appearance. As they aimed for a beautiful design, Atlus asked the development team what kind of weapon a girl should wield. There were responses saying that "girls look cute when they are brandishing about a massive weapon", or that "so long as it looked cool it was good", so they gave her a naginata. Additionally, the naginata was meant to contrast the male protagonist's Japanese sword. While Persona games past Persona 3 have never include a female protagonist due to workload concerns, it was possible in Persona 3 Portable due to the circumstances of the rerelease's development, as well as the narrative allowing them to change the protagonist's gender without any other major changes.

== Appearances ==
=== In Persona 3 ===
The protagonist of Persona 3 moves into the Iwatodai dorm, learning of his ability to summon the Personas Orpheus of The Fool Arcana and Thanatos of The Death Arcana when the dorm is attacked by Shadows during the Dark Hour. Mitsuru asks him to join SEES and he is later elected the team's leader in combat. The protagonist is unique among his cohorts in that he has the Wild Card ability which enables him to wield multiple Personas and switch between them during battle. Over the course of the game, he also gains Messiah of the Judgement Arcana and Orpheus Telos of the Fool Arcana in Persona 3 FES. With the power of the Wild Card, he has access to over 150 different Personas. Over the course of the game, the player is challenged to manage the protagonist's day-to-day schedule as he attends school, takes part in extracurricular activities, and spends time with classmates and other characters. Igor, the proprietor of the Velvet Room, encourages the protagonist to form Social Links with people, as they will determine his potential in combat. As he works with SEES, the protagonist builds up the Social Link for the Fool Arcana, which symbolizes beginning and infinite possibilities of the journey ahead. When the protagonist decides to spare Ryoji Mochizuki, the Social Link of the Fool Arcana changes into the Judgement Arcana, which symbolizes the end of his journey and looking back at what has transpired this far.

The protagonist is an orphan; his parents died ten years prior to the events of Persona 3, which sees him returning to the city he grew up in. In December, the player learns that a Shadow known as "Death" was sealed in the protagonist as a child by Aigis, who was unable to defeat it herself. The Death Shadow was able to lead the protagonist to twelve other greater Shadows; by defeating them, The Appriser was created, a being which summons Nyx to the world to bring about its destruction. SEES battles The Appriser on the roof of Tartarus, but are not able to stop Nyx's descent to Earth. The protagonist enters Nyx and using the power of his accumulated Social Links, seals it away with the "Great Seal"—at the cost of his own self.

However, the protagonist miraculously appears outside Gekkoukan High and reunites with the other members of SEES following the erasure of Tartarus and the Dark Hour. With their memories as SEES gone, they continue going to school as if nothing had transpired. The protagonist's Social Links, including some members of SEES point out that the protagonist is looking pale, and urges him to not push himself. On March 5th, the day of his seniors' graduation ceremony, the protagonist and Aigis head to the rooftop of Gekkoukan High due to retaining their memories of promising to meet with the rest of SEES on that day. Since the day Nyx was sealed, the protagonist had been pushing himself for over a month to fulfill his promise, with it finally coming to an end. He lies down on Aigis' lap, closes his eyes, and passes away on the rooftop just before the rest of SEES arrives upon regaining their memories.

=== Other appearances ===
Persona 3 FES extends upon the original game with the introduction of an epilogue called The Answer. These events reveal that the protagonist died after becoming the Great Seal used to seal Nyx away. After being led to the Great Seal, SEES discovers it to be under attack by a creature called Erebus. Although Makoto does not appear in Persona 4 and the sequel Persona 4 Arena, it is revealed in those games Igor's assistant Elizabeth left her position to find a way to rescue the protagonist from his fate as the Great Seal.

In the PlayStation Portable port Persona 3 Portable, an option was added to control a female protagonist.

The protagonist is also featured in several radio dramas that tell new stories related to the games. In the manga, the protagonist is named Minato Arisato (有里 湊, Arisato Minato). There, he is portrayed as a quiet teenager who often is tired or drowsy, and likes to eat and cook food. The character also appears in the game Persona Q: Shadow of the Labyrinth, where he joins forces with the Persona 4 cast to defeat the Shadows. In the stage musical adaption, Persona 3: The Weird Masquerade, the male protagonist is named Sakuya Shiomi (汐見 朔也, Shiomi Sakuya) and was portrayed by Shouta Aoi while the female version is named Kotone Shiomi (汐見 琴音, Shiomi Kotone) and was portrayed by Kana Asumi. The name “Kotone Shiomi” was later adopted as female protagonist’s name in Persona 5: The Phantom X.

In the anime film series Persona 3 The Movie, he takes the name of Makoto Yuki (結城 理, Yūki Makoto). Makoto is portrayed as an ambivalent individual with an initial neutral viewpoint on the film's theme of life and death, making his growth via new found experiences the focus of the movie. He uses the same name in Persona 3: Dancing in Moonlight and Persona 5: The Phantom X.

He appears as a costume for the Mii characters in Super Smash Bros. Ultimate. He also appears in the mobile game Star Ocean: Anamnesis as part of a crossover with the Persona series.

He also appears as a playable character in Persona Q2 : New Cinema Labyrinth with his female form being an alternate person from another universe. The male character also appears as a downloadable content boss fight in Persona 5 Royal.

== Reception ==
Critical reception to the protagonist's character has been positive. GameSpy's Patrick Joynt praised the character's social life in Persona 3 as it allowed the player to interact with several other characters and learn about their interesting stories. GamesRadar+ commented that while Makoto is a "Japanese RPG stereotype" it was refreshing to see him dealing with his social life. Damian Thomas from RPGFan saw the interactions between the main character and his dorm mates as one of the game's best parts due to the character growth in each social link. He was also included as the 10th best Persona character by Kimberley Wallace from Game Informer who found his role in Persona 3 admirable. While finding the bond of the protagonist and the Persona deep, Sven Dwulecki wrote that Persona 4 does a better job at exploring such connection through its cast who face their hidden fears in the form of Shadows. For the release of the remake Reload, Automaton Media noted that the player starting romantic relationships required too much to work and the protagonist fails to get too intimate with most of his love interests even after reaching the maximum part which makes the protagonists from Persona 4 and Persona 5 to have more desired romantic moments with their partners.

Reaction to the character's portrayal in the animated film Persona 3 The Movie: #1 Spring of Birth was also met with praise. Richard Eisenbeis of Kotaku described the protagonist as being an initially "ambivalent, broken character..." whose growth takes center stage and gave the film "a suitable sense of completion." Elliot Gay from Japanator saw Makoto's growth from an "empty, aloof, and distant young man" who "lacks any kind of real determination to do anything" to his growth as a person as one of the film's main focus. His relationship with Aigis and his comical actions have also been praised by Gay during a review for the second film. However, his characterization in Persona 3 The Movie: No. 4, Winter of Rebirth was criticized for being more silent than usual giving a sense of regression to his character arc.

The addition of the female protagonist to Persona 3 Portable was praised by IGN for how different her interactions with other characters are, while also adding potential replay value. Destructoid agreed, commenting especially on how the new alternate version of the protagonist can form romantic relationships with characters that the original game could not show. RPGFan agreed with IGN due to the time the player can spend with the female lead's relationships. GamesRadar+ stated that while at first the differences might be only cosmetic, the character's interactions with the cast, most notably Social Links characters are very different. Game Informer claimed that returning players from the original Persona 3 might have new content with the new lead thanks to her original Personas. In "Comparative Analysis of Storytelling Technique in Kingdom Hearts II (2005) and Persona 3 Portable (2009)" Shazwin Bt. Sahmir and Norlela Ismail from Universiti Teknologi MARA, saw the protagonist as distinctively kind and calm as he is used to dealing with the Dark Hour and often provides comfort to the other characters he meets. The writer notes that the protagonists' actions are more notable in the Portable version due to the new mechanics the player is given in order to help others such as Shinjiro if the player used the female avatar and bonded with him. Regardless of gender chosen, the protagonist is consistently silent, giving the player a major immersion into the game similar to a visual novel. The relationship the female avatar develops with Koromaru has been compared by Juan F. Belmonte from University of Murcia with other famous relationships involving pets in gaming such as Shadow and Interceptor from Final Fantasy VI or Cloud Strife and Red XIII from Final Fantasy VII due to how the Persona pet develops when interacting with the protagonist to the point of feeling human as a result of understanding her. The development of such bond has been compared to Freya and Zidane Tribal from Final Fantasy IX as both sides come across as interspecies relationships as a result of the romance.

When Atlus announced the Persona 3 remake would not have the female protagonist, Inverse writer Willa Rowe heavily criticized that decision, as she viewed such avatar of the player as the best character in Persona 3 Portable; Inverse specifically enjoyed the female protagonist for several of her possible lines in the game which made her more likable than the male one while dealing with explicitly queer stories that are not mixed with negative stereotypes. Kotaku noticed that the lack of her inclusion made the fanbase upset. Meanwhile, when it came to the replacement of English voice actors, Yuri Lowenthal believed Aleks Le was worthy of succeeding him for the role of the male protagonist. GamesRadar+ criticized the negative response from the fans about the removal of the female protagonist and believed they would have to wait for more trailers. The desire to include the female avatar resulted into the Femc Reloaded Project, a mod created by fans of the game which attracted the attention of the media for showing the importance and popularity of such character. Kazuhisa Wada, the remake's producer, explained that budgetary and time-related concerns were the primary reasons why the female protagonist was not included. He did acknowledge the demand for the female protagonist, but said that she is still unlikely to ever be added to Reload.

The developers of the project sought to restore the female protagonist along with other features that were exclusively in Portable, such as the optional male Velvet Room attendant Theodore, and the female protagonist's alternate over world, school, battle, and Social Link themes from Portable's soundtrack. The mod was published on February 19, 2024, seventeen days after Reload itself was released.
