= Persona 3 Reload =

2024 video game

- Developer: P-Studio
- Publisher: Sega: JP: Atlus
- Director: Takuya Yamaguchi (Note: Episode Aigis DLC directed by Yu Hashizume. Original game directed by Katsura Hashino.)
- Producers: Ryota Niitsuma; Kazuhisa Wada
- Designer: Kai Suehiro
- Programmer: Tomohiko Imanishi
- Artists: Azusa Shimada; Tomohiro Kumagai; Yuichiro Takada; Shigenori Soejima
- Writer: Daizaburo Nonoue (Note: Original game written by Yuichiro Tanaka)
- Composers: Atsushi Kitajoh; (Note: Music for Episode Aigis DLC composed by Ryota Kozuka. Original music and some rearrangements composed by Shoji Meguro)
- Series: Persona
- Engine: Unreal Engine 4
- Platforms: PlayStation 4; PlayStation 5; Windows; Xbox One; Xbox Series X/S; Nintendo Switch 2
- Release: PS4, PS5, WIN, XBO, XBX/S; February 2, 2024; Nintendo Switch 2; October 23, 2025
- Genres: Role-playing, social simulation
- Mode: Single-player

Persona 3 Reload (Note: Japanese: ペルソナ3 リロード, Hepburn: Perusona 3 Rirōdo) is a 2024 role-playing video game developed and published by Atlus. Reload is a remake of Persona 3 (2006), the fourth main installment of the Persona series, itself part of the larger Megami Tensei franchise. As with the original game, the protagonist is a high school student returning to his home city a decade after his parents were killed in a car crash. He soon gains the potential to summon a Persona, the physical manifestation of his inner spirit, and joins the Specialized Extracurricular Execution Squad (S.E.E.S.), a group of like-minded Persona users. Together, they are tasked with defeating Shadows and uncovering the mystery of the Dark Hour.

A remake of Persona 3 was often requested by fans following the series' push towards global popularity thanks to the success of Persona 5 (2016), as was officially acknowledged by Atlus themselves. Reload began development in 2019 and was announced in June 2023. Reload remakes the main story of Persona 3, with various graphical and functional updates that bring the game in parity with the series' later installments. Shigenori Soejima oversaw overhauled art direction by Tomohiro Kumagai and updated character designs by Azusa Shimada. The music was written primarily by Atsushi Kitajoh, with additional arrangements by original composer Shoji Meguro, and vocal tracks performed by Azumi Takahashi and Lotus Juice.

Persona 3 Reload was released for PlayStation 4, PlayStation 5, Windows, Xbox One, and Xbox Series X/S on February 2, 2024. A Nintendo Switch 2 version was released on October 23, 2025. The game received generally positive reviews from critics and sold a million units within its first week of release, making it the fastest game in the series to sell one million units.

== Gameplay ==
Persona 3 Reload retains its core hybrid of traditional role-playing and social simulation gameplay, but is overhauled aesthetically, graphically and mechanically to integrate systems and features that have been introduced to the Persona series since the original Persona 3's release, specifically deriving from quality-of-life improvements first implemented in Persona 5 (2016). In addition to foundational overhauls, Reload refines numerous elements of its graphical user interface to reflect the updated presentation of subsequent entries. For story-sensitive tasks, objective descriptions have been added below the display for the date, time of day and moon phase that list actions that must be performed to progress the narrative, which is functionally similar to Persona 5's heads-up display. The map display has also been improved in function and form over the original Persona 3, having been expanded in size in addition to depicting more intricacies about the surrounding environment, and now placing markers on important locations that need to be visited for story purposes, much like Persona 5's map. The ability for the protagonist to run through areas has also been added.

New gameplay additions to the social simulation and role-playing portions of the game were introduced in Reload. The Iwatodai Dorm where the main party resides outside classes has been expanded upon with multiple activities to perform beyond the original game. The protagonist is now able to strike individual conversations with every dorm resident, cook food with resuscitative abilities in the dorm's kitchen, garden and tend plants on the dorm's roof by feeding them nutrients periodically, rent out films to watch using a DVD player, as well as borrow and read books provided to the dorm by the school. As with the corresponding in-house activities in Persona 4 and Persona 5, performing these tasks strengthen each of the protagonist's Social Stats which can be used to later pursue specific interactions with Social Links. For example, reading books increase the protagonist's Academics for school, while gardening yields the reward of the protagonist being able to learn new Tactics in battle. Furthermore, the protagonist can partake in each of the aforementioned activities alongside another party member, which grants them additional buffs for combat scenarios.

The protagonist helps Junpei Iori answer a question. The social simulation element of Persona 3 was improved with numerous new features, including brand-new questions to quizzes like this.

While attending Gekkoukan High School, the in-class questions from the subject teachers have been redone from scratch, with none being repurposed from the original game. Exploration both around Tatsumi Port Island and within Tartarus is now done from a third-person perspective with the camera now being positioned directly behind the protagonist, and now enables free camera control for the player to get better views of their surroundings. The overworld map is now fully rendered in 3D, and has an additional button prompt for displaying information on the protagonist's current location, or other areas they can visit. Expanding on Persona 3 Portable's fast travel function, the player is also able to immediately fast-travel to any specific location within the highlighted area directly from the map itself as opposed to within the location. Reload removes the ability for the player to completely break Social Links with supporting characters as was possible in both Persona 3 and Persona 4 (2008), although the player is still able to reverse them through choosing the protagonist's dismissive responses to interactions. A new social element was introduced, that exists separately from Social Links. It is meant to contextualize supporting characters who weren't as prominent in previous iterations of Persona 3, through the inclusion of side-story arcs that will deepen the protagonist's relationship with them, which will also extend to the male party members due to the lack of dedicated Social Link stories for them.

The structure and progression within Tartarus has not been altered from the original game whatsoever, but has been expanded with more environmental variety to encourage exploration, and sports unique visual effects accomplished by the game's use of Unreal Engine 4, such as improved lighting. The fatigue mechanic has been completely removed to reflect subsequent entries, making it so that the party is unable to tire during exploration, thus no longer affecting their battle performance. Each floor within Tartarus also houses breakable objects in the form of fire effigies that can be swung at to obtain hidden treasure and items. The player is unable to contact the Navigator (between Mitsuru Kirijo and later Fuuka Yamagishi) in Tartarus to change the dungeon's background music like in the original game, nor is the player able to direct the party to split up and find hidden Treasures and Shadows scattered on the current floor. The party is also able to either walk or fully sprint when traversing the dungeon, but doing the latter also increases the chance that Shadows patrolling the current floor are alerted to the party's presence.

The protagonist engages in battle with an enemy in the game's updated combat system.

During battle, both the ability to take direct control over party members as in Portable, as well as enabling the CPU to dictate their behavior as in the original game and FES, are available. The battle user interface has been completely overhauled to take functional and stylistic inspiration from Persona 5, with the commands "Persona", "Item", "Guard" and "Attack" each corresponding to different buttons in a similar fashion. In addition to the returning "Analyze", "Tactics", "Target" and "Rush" commands from prior iterations of Persona 3, a "Survey" and "Assist" function have also been added. Persona 3 Reload implements an improved variation of the "Baton Pass" skill from Persona 5 in the form of the "Shift" ability mapped to the left trigger. "Shift" enables the current active party member to pass their turn onto another character after successfully landing a hit on a Shadow enemy that knocks them Down, allowing the next party member to potentially knock other enemies Down if they are in certain formations. When all enemies on the battle screen are knocked Down as with the original game, the party is given the option to initiate an "All-Out Attack" that involves all active members performing a joint assault on any remaining enemies for significant damage. Depending on who in the party starts the command, the character has a personalized outro and unique animation in a similar vein to the finisher screens in Persona 5. Additional Personas for the party are still obtained primarily through the post-battle minigame Shuffle Time, but Reload instead allows the player to manually choose what specific card they want out of the randomized selection as opposed to blindly selecting one after they are shuffled, similar to Persona 4 Golden's version of the minigame.

== Development ==
The menu screen of Persona 3 Reload. The user interface for Reload was revamped to match the overall theme of Persona 3.

Atlus had begun development of a remake of Persona 3 by 2019. The large majority of P-Studio's staff working on Persona 5 Royal (2019) at this time were shifted over to Reload, with the studio's chief director Kazuhisa Wada exclaiming that developing Persona 3 Reload was hugely important for Atlus due to the original game's influence on the rest of the Persona series, as well as the unique challenges presented with both remaking an existing title, and developing a game on a third-party game engine, as the game is powered by Unreal Engine 4 as opposed to the proprietary engine Atlus previously used for games such as Royal and Catherine: Full Body (2019). The Reload naming was conceived as a result of the developers wanting to use another moniker with the letter "R" to convey its status as a definitive edition of Persona 3 as Persona 5 Royal was to Persona 5, feeling as if simply calling it "Persona 3 Remake" was not fitting for the naming conventions of the series. The Reload name was also used to reflect the pistol-like Evokers used by the party to summon their Personas during battle.

Following the game's official reveal, Atlus shared several additional details about Reload. P-Studio chief director Kazuhisa Wada and game producer Ryota Niitsuma clarified their intentions of producing a completely faithful recreation of the original Persona 3 experience, including implementing multiple "new scenes and events" beyond the retained narrative. However, the pair confirmed that as a result of remaining solely faithful to the game as it was originally released, none of the story content integrated into either Persona 3 FES or Persona 3 Portable would be remade for Reload, such as the epilogue chapter "The Answer" or the second female protagonist and her associated content. Wada clarified following this interview however, that other story and gameplay elements first added to the main story scenario in FES would still feature in the game.

During a separate interview published in Weekly Famitsu, Wada, Niitsuma and game director Takuya Yamaguchi also expressed enthusiasm towards introducing alterations to the existing game's controls and map design, highlighting that the game's main dungeon, Tartarus, would undergo a "particularly large change" in structure from the original game due to the increase in environmental density, as well as interactive features and landscapes within existing areas. They also discussed the intent and overall importance behind producing Persona 3 Reload at this time, asserting that while they didn't want to change the plot or characters that form the original game's foundation, they were keen on players being able to enjoy Persona 3 at a functional and graphical fidelity equivalent to recent entries in the series such as Persona 5 and Persona 5 Royal, which was the stance they assumed at the start of development. Yamaguchi elaborated on the effort it took to remake all the game's original environments and artwork, exemplifying that the field had not just been expanded to be more proportionate with characters populating the playable areas, but also to "increase the density of game elements and scenery". Yamaguchi further discussed the addition of new scenarios beyond reproducing the original game's narrative, feeling it fitting for the game's nature as an "ensemble drama" so they may explore characters who weren't as prominent in the original game.

In August 2023, a further Famitsu interview was conducted between Wada, Niitsuma, Yamaguchi and composer Atsushi Kitajoh. They elaborated on the development process of remaking the game's assets, stating that the character models from Persona 3: Dancing in Moonlight (2018), which marked the first time many Persona 3 elements were fully rendered in high-definition, were used as a base for corresponding models in Reload. However, the Reload assets were otherwise produced from scratch with various adjustments, such as Aigis having her proportions altered to emphasize her unique physical traits as a cybernetic being compared to the regular human characters. Yamaguchi spoke on elements of the game shown in the game's second trailer, confirming that party members Koromaru and Shinjiro Aragaki would have dedicated side-stories outside the main narrative in Reload, with the former's side-story focusing on expanding Koromaru's backstory, while Shinjiro's content would highlight his charm amongst the party members. The developers also confirmed that the "Aeon" social link with Aigis from Persona 3 FES would be retained in the game. By this time, Persona 3 Reload had entered its final stages of development.

=== Presentation ===
The protagonist studies with his friends, in one of many brand new hangout scenes in Reload.

The character models and assets have been remade from the ground up to be presented as more proportionate relative to the environment design in a similar vein to Persona 5's art direction, which is also reflected in the revamped lighting engine and the number of non-playable characters that populate the playable areas of the game, both of which have been improved upon when contrasted with the original game. Performance has also been increased from all previous versions' 30 frames per second (FPS), to up to 60 FPS at up to 4K resolution (3840x2160) on PlayStation 5, Windows and Xbox Series X. The Nintendo Switch 2 version of the game, which originally shipped with a resolution output of 1080p and consistent 30FPS performance across both docked and handheld configurations, was updated by Atlus in December 2025 to add a 'Performance Mode' preset that increased the framerate to 60FPS in TV Mode. Reload contains additional scenes not featured in the original game or any of its re-releases, including new party interactions, dialogue, and voiced cutscenes. Every Social Link route is now completely voiced. Exploration within Tartarus also features additional dialogue amongst the party depending on who is taken into the dungeon. The animated cutscenes from the original PlayStation 2 version of Persona 3 have been recreated.

The Japanese voice cast reprised their respective roles, alongside Shinya Takahashi, who serves as Koromaru's dedicated voice actor after previously voicing him in the four-part Persona 3 The Movie film series. The main English voice cast from previous games has been entirely re-cast for Reload, including the protagonist (Aleks Le), Mitsuru Kirijo (Allegra Clark), Yukari Takeba (Heather Gonzalez), Junpei Iori (Zeno Robinson), Aigis (Dawn Bennett), Akihiko Sanada (Alejandro Saab), Fuuka Yamagishi (Suzie Yeung), Shinjiro Aragaki (Justice Slocum) and Ken Amada (Justine Lee). Kirk Thornton voices Igor, the proprietor of the Velvet Room, reprising his role from the English dub of Persona 5 (2016).

Most of the original voice actors for the Persona 3 party members in English appear in different roles throughout the game. Tara Platt, who voiced Mitsuru and the Velvet Room attendant Elizabeth in the original game, reprises the latter role in Reload. Yuri Lowenthal, the previous English voice for the protagonist, Pharos, and Ryoji, appears as Eiichiro Takeba, Yukari's father and a lead researcher for the Kirijo Group's experiments on Shadows. Liam O'Brien, who previously dubbed Akihiko in English, voices Officer Kurosawa, the night patrolman at Paulownia Mall who acts as a discrete weapons dealer for S.E.E.S. and an informant on civilians who go missing in Tartarus during the Dark Hour; Wendee Lee, who dubbed Fuuka in English from Persona 4 Arena onwards, voices Ms. Terauchi, the English teacher at Gekkoukan High School; Michelle Ruff, the original English voice for Yukari, appears as the unnamed shopkeeper at Maiyodo Antiquities, a business the protagonist can visit at Paulownia Mall that sells additional weapons and armor for the party to equip. Grant George, the original voice for Shinjiro and Jin in English, voices Takeharu Kirijo, Mitsuru's father and the head of the Kirijo Group who was a benefactor towards the research project into Shadows and the Dark Hour.

The female protagonist's alternate story route from Persona 3 Portable is not included in the game. With the additional voiced lines added in Tartarus and the game's side-stories, Persona 3 Reload has the most spoken dialogue of any game in the series. The game was made using Unreal Engine 4.

=== Art design ===
Early concept art of Persona 3 Reload featuring the protagonist

Azusa Shimada serves as Persona 3 Reload's main character designer, with original artist Shigenori Soejima taking on a supervisory role. The two collaborated to refine the existing designs, as well as update the S.E.E.S. equipment when entering Tartarus. This includes a new armband, which was teased by game director Takuya Yamaguchi to have ties to a new mechanic during Shadow encounters, and a combat attire unique to every party member. Shimada and Soejima also updated the look of the Evokers; a small gimmick was added to emphasize the impact of Persona summoning, describing how the Evoker's pistol slide blows back and emits a red light after being fired.

Tomohiro Kumagai, a lead UI designer at P-Studio on Persona 4 Arena Ultimax (2013), as well as both Persona 5 and Royal, serves as Reload's art director. Kumagai was among Yamaguchi's earliest hires for the project shortly after he assumed the role as the game's director. Kumagai became attracted to the prospects of working on the game having been captivated by the original Persona 3's art design, and its notion that a user interface could have powerful synergy with the game's themes. He explained that Reload's menu interface drawing on the imagery of being submerged in water, was developed from his initial perception of the original game's heavy usage of blue in the menus, which was further iterated on by the UI design team. He also envisioned slower animations and softer aesthetics in the menus, in order to contrast Persona 5's emphasis on aggressive movements and pop-punk influences, deriving inspiration from the sea surrounding Tatsumi Port Island, the game's primary setting. A special 3D character model of the protagonist was created by the animation team for use exclusively in the game's menus, with a large number of animation skeletons and polygons used to express the character's emotions, and the shimmering effect conveying the feeling of being submerged in water. Kumagai stressed that it was equally important that the team retained the ease of navigation and responsiveness present in Persona 5's user interface.

Logo drafts for Persona 3 Reload

The game's final logo went through multiple design iterations, with earlier concepts entirely reimagining the typeface to illustrate the intent of the game rebooting Persona 3 for a new audience. However, as it became increasingly clear to the development staff that Reload would retain the original game's core while only updating its presentation and accessibility, Kumagai and Azusa Shimada created a logo that largely resembled the original game's title treatment, but with the Reload moniker communicating its status as a remake with new elements as opposed to an HD remaster.

The game's official box art drawn by Shimada is an intentional recreation of Persona 3's Japanese PlayStation 2 key art, featuring the protagonist alongside the Persona Thanatos. Multiple revisions were made to update the homage, as Soejima and Yamaguchi discussed whether to just feature the protagonist and his Persona, or alongside the other main characters in the game. The final result was meant to subtly convey the game's updated visuals with modern drawing techniques and emphasized realistic lighting effects, as well as focus on the protagonist standing up to his destiny.

=== Music ===
The score for Persona 3 Reload was written primarily by Atsushi Kitajoh, with original composer Shoji Meguro's original arrangements being used for several instrumental tracks in newly recorded versions. It features arranged tracks from the original game with a few additional tracks, including a second battle theme "It's Going Down Now". YouTuber Azumi Takahashi replaced Yumi Kawamura as the lead vocalist, with rapper Lotus Juice returning as the sub vocalist. Lotus Juice requested some changes to the vocal tracks, such as rewriting lyrics to better fit the scenes. To coincide with the game's Nintendo Switch 2 release in October 2025, Atlus released a free update to all versions of Persona 3 Reload which added Kawamura's original vocal tracks from Persona 3 and Persona 3 FES as background music for dungeon exploration and battles.

==== Charts ====
Weekly chart performance for "It's Going Down Now"
Chart (2024–25)	Peak position
Brazilian Japan Songs (Billboard Japan)	1
French Japan Songs (Billboard Japan)	2
German Japan Songs (Billboard Japan)	6
Global Japan Songs (Billboard Japan)	1
Japanese Download Songs (Billboard Japan)	68
South African Japan Songs (Billboard Japan)	1
UK Japan Songs (Billboard Japan)	1
US Japan Songs (Billboard Japan)	1

2024 annual chart rankings for "It's Going Down Now"
Chart (2024)	Rank
Brazilian Japan Songs (Billboard Japan)	17
UK Japan Songs (Billboard Japan)	11
US Japan Songs (Billboard Japan)	14

2025 annual chart rankings for "It's Going Down Now"
Chart (2025)	Rank
Brazilian Japan Songs (Billboard Japan)	3
French Japan Songs (Billboard Japan)	17
German Japan Songs (Billboard Japan)	15
Global Japan Songs (Billboard Japan)	12
South African Japan Songs (Billboard Japan)	7
UK Japan Songs (Billboard Japan)	3
US Japan Songs (Billboard Japan)	3

== Marketing and release ==
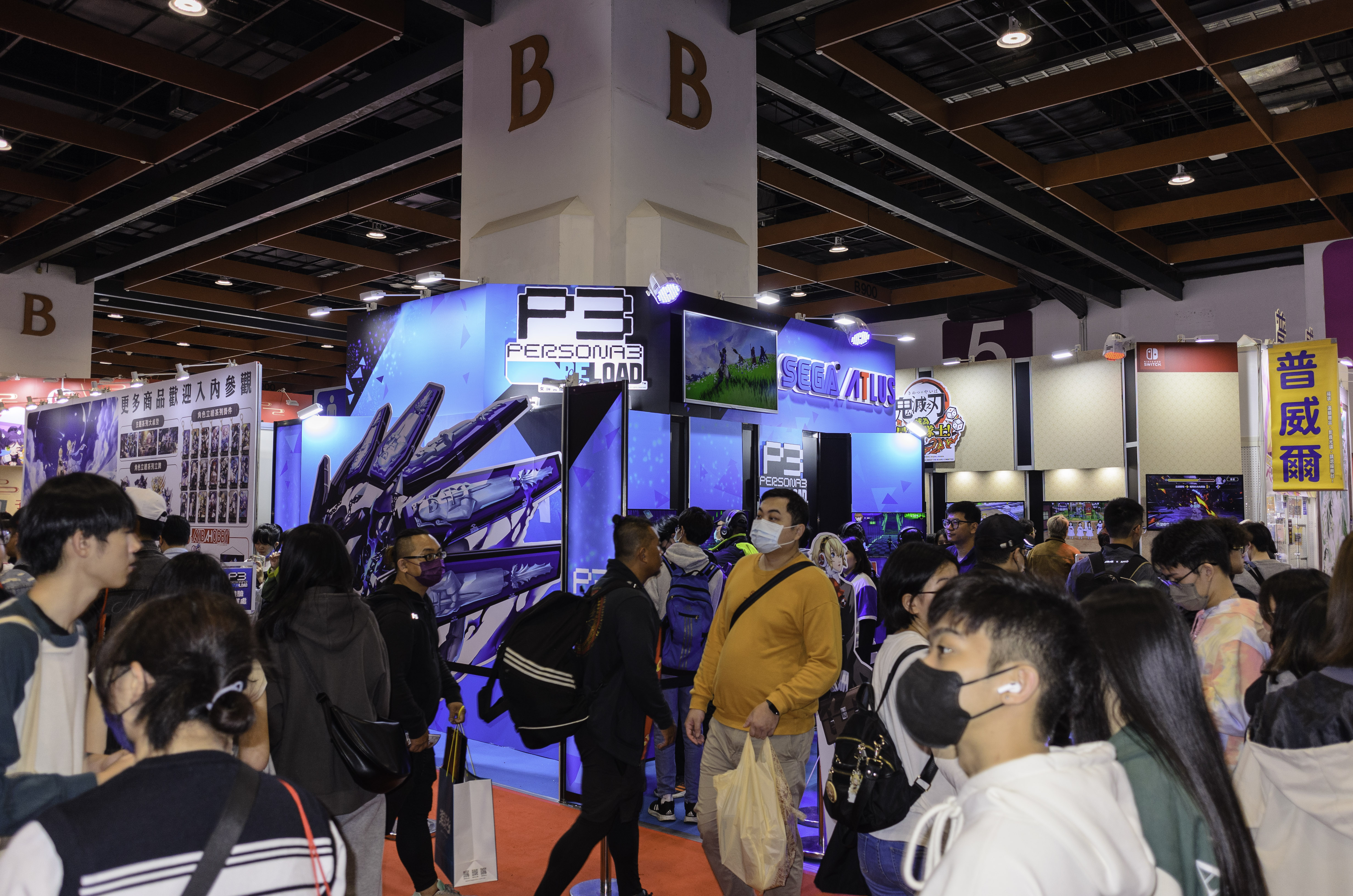
Booth showcasing Persona 3 Reload at the 2024 Taipei International Comics & Animation Festival

In July 2022, Atlus conducted a consumer-led survey in Japan gauging interest in potential remakes and re-releases of past games from the publisher, specifically in the Megami Tensei franchise. During a livestreamed broadcast of the poll results, Atlus revealed that Persona 3 (2006) had been tied with Persona 2: Innocent Sin (1999) and Persona 2: Eternal Punishment (2000) in terms of the most requested game to be remade by the publisher.

In April 2023, internally screened footage from Sega leaked online, showing footage of Persona 3 party member Yukari Takeba engaging in an encounter with a Shadow, alleged to be from an early development build of a Persona 3 remake. News publication site Gematsu later corroborated the footage, with a contributing writer stating that the firm had heard from anonymous sources close to Sega that a remake of the game was in development, and that the build shown in the sizzle reel was sourced from 2021. That same day, a Twitter user uncovered a registered web domain named "p3re.jp", which was speculated to be connected to a Persona 3 remake due to its shorthand abbreviation potentially referencing the game and following previously registered web domains for projects in the Persona series.

In early June 2023, Atlus Japan renewed the aforementioned "p3re.jp" web domain speculated to be connected to the Persona 3 remake, alongside a new web domain, "p5t.jp", surmised by gaming news outlets to be connected to a potential spin-off title for Persona 5. Shortly thereafter, Atlus West accidentally uploaded the reveal trailer for the remake, titled Persona 3 Reload, on their official Instagram account alongside the trailer for the spin-off title Persona 5 Tactica (2023). Both games did not officially get announced until Microsoft's Xbox Games Showcase event, which aired later in the week. The following month, Sega hosted a panel dedicated to the game at Anime Expo 2023 attended by Reload's English voice cast, which was accompanied by a second trailer showcasing the game's English dub.

Between October 2023 and January 2024, Atlus West posted a series of featurettes titled Reloaded: The Voices of Persona 3 onto their YouTube channel, featuring interviews and anecdotes about the development and legacy of Persona 3, from both the English voice cast of the original game as well as Reload's new cast.

Persona 3 Reload released for PlayStation 4, PlayStation 5, Windows, Xbox One, and Xbox Series X/S on February 2, 2024. From launch until August 2025, it was available to play on Xbox Game Pass. A Nintendo Switch 2 version of the game was announced during the July 2025 Nintendo Direct Partner Showcase presentation and was released on October 23, 2025. Alongside the standard edition, a Digital Deluxe and Digital Premium Edition are also available. Both editions bundle the game with a digital soundtrack and artbook, while the Premium version additionally comes with a downloadable content (DLC) pack of in-game extras. A physical collector's edition, dubbed the "Aigis Edition", comes with unique packaging, physical versions of the artbook and soundtrack, a large bust of the character Aigis, and vouchers for the DLC pack. The PlayStation 4 version of the game offers a free upgrade to the PlayStation 5 version and the physical Xbox release supports the Smart Delivery function between Xbox One and Xbox Series X depending on where the game is installed.

A demo, which allows players access to the first half of the game and one of the bosses - akin to Metaphor: ReFantazio's demo - was released on April 9, 2025, a year after the game's release; much like the aforementioned Metaphor demo, save data could be transferred to the full game. This demo was released on Nintendo Switch 2 on September 12, 2025, ahead of the title's release the following month.

According to producer Kazuhisa Wada and Yoshihiro Komori, who directed the game's Nintendo Switch 2 port, Reload was initially planned to release for the original Nintendo Switch earlier in development, but said version was ultimately scrapped due to performance issues that would've necessitated a longer optimization period and potential redesigns of the user interface and art, both of which being factors that made their intentions of simultaneously releasing with the other platforms impossible.

=== Downloadable content ===
Persona 3 Reload was released alongside a set of day-one downloadable content (DLC) comprising in-game extras, which can either be purchased standalone, or in a bundle. These include costume sets inspired by the Yasogami High School uniforms from Persona 4 (2008), as well as the Shujiin Academy uniforms and Phantom Thieves of Hearts attire from Persona 5 (2016) for the party members to wear during dungeon exploration. Also included are additional Persona sets featuring Personas from Persona 4, Persona 5, and Persona 5 Royal, as well as a custom background music set featuring tracks from Persona 5 Royal. Those that pre-ordered the game also got access to a custom background music set featuring tracks from Persona 4 Golden. An expansion pass featuring three waves of downloadable content was announced during an Xbox Partner Preview livestream on March 6, 2024. The first wave, released one week later on March 12, features additional background music tracks from Persona 4 Golden and Persona 5 Royal. The second, released on May 31, 2024, includes Velvet Room costumes for the characters and new music tracks.

Promotional Image for Episode Aigis, featuring Aigis and the Protagonist

Episode Aigis: The Answer, (Note: Known simply as "Episode Aegis" in Japan) a remake of "The Answer" epilogue chapter originally released as both an add-on disc for the original Persona 3 and as part of Persona 3 FES, was released on September 10, 2024. In an interview, producer Kazuhisa Wada explained that even though the story of this chapter caused some controversy among players, its remake remains faithful to the original. Because the team was short on staff, the DLC was directed by Yu Hashizume, the battle planner of games such as Tokyo Mirage Sessions ♯FE and Soul Hackers 2. Since Hashizume is not part of P-Studio, the proposal surprised him, but he decided to accept the position to get involved with the Persona series. The music from the original game was rearranged by Atsushi Kitajoh, and two new songs were created by Ryota Kozuka: an opening theme and a battle theme. Episode Aigis is set to be the last piece of downloadable content for the game. According to Wada, the addition of a female protagonist was considered during development but was deemed too time-consuming and expensive compared to the epilogue. He also stated that the Persona team "has a mission to work on not only remakes but also 'completely new' projects". The remake introduces several mechanical refinement to the epilogue's combat and exploration systems to that align with the new system introduced in the base game. Unlike the original version, players can now access the "Heartless" difficulty level, which provides a rigorous challenge by restricting the use of a carried over Persona Compendium from previous save files. The story expansion also introduces Metis, a new character and Aigis's sister, who features a unique Theurgy gauge that increases when receiving a Shift from Party member. In the remake, Additionally, the inclusion of "Linked Episodes" and "Monad Doors" provides further challenging dungeon-crawling experience remain engaging while preserving the story's focus on emotional conclusion of the base game.

=== Tie-in media and merchandise ===
In February 2024, Atlus announced a collaboration with Cerevo to make a 1:1 replica of the Evoker as depicted in Reload. A prototype was showcased at the Wonder Festival 2024 Winter. The Evoker replica was announced to be released in March 2025. A promotional event for the Evoker replica was held on July 12–13, 2025 at the 6th floor of Volks Akihabara Hobby Paradise 2, where visitors can try out the replica before purchasing it. Additionally, a five-issue webcomic adaptation of the game was published by Merryweather Media to the webtoon platform WEBTOON CANVAS.

Atlus also announced a collaboration with Koikeya to market limited edition potato chips and charms based on the game. In July 2024, Atlus and Platinum Pens announced a collaboration to market a special fountain pen sold by Premium Bandai. On July 3, 2024, McFarlane Toys announced a 2025 release for a themed line of Persona 3 Reload action figures. Accompanying the game's release were two vinyl soundtrack releases; both distributed by iam8bit; the first was released in 2024 and encompasses the game's original soundtrack, and another, releasing in 2025, revolves around the Episode Aigis DLC.

In March 2025, a collaboration with Persona 5: The Phantom X was announced.

=== Other media ===
The Reload version of Mass Destruction was produced and performed as part of two-time Olympic figure skating champion Yuzuru Hanyu's Echoes of Life Tour ice show. It was directed by the Japanese choreographer and director Mikiko.

== Reception ==
Reception

Aggregate scores
Aggregator	Score
Metacritic	(NS2) 80/100 (PC) 89/100 (PS5) 87/100 (XSXS) 86/100; Episode Aigis: (PC) 78/100 (PS5) 71/100 (XSXS) 75/100
OpenCritic	94% recommend 47% recommend(Episode Aigis)

Review scores
Publication	Score
Destructoid	6.5/10
Digital Trends	4.5/5 stars
Easy Allies	9/10
Eurogamer	4/5 stars
Game Informer	8.75/10
GameRevolution	9/10
GameSpot	9/10
IGN	9/10; 8/10 (Episode Aigis)
Nintendo Life	8/10
Nintendo World Report	8/10
NME	4/5 stars
PC Gamer (US)	89/100
PCGamesN	8/10
PCMag	3.5/5 stars
Push Square	(Episode Aigis)
RPGFan	97/100; 83/100 (Episode Aigis)
Shacknews	9/10
TouchArcade	4.5/5
VG247	4/5 stars
VideoGamer.com	9/10

=== Pre-release critical reception ===
Previews of Persona 3 Reload were generally positively received by games journalists, who praised the updated visuals and gameplay, as well as the game's faithfulness to the original, Kenneth Shepard of Kotaku praised the demo overall, but disliked the remade music. Jasmine Gould-Wilson of GamesRadar described the demo as "a blast" and said the game "could be an excellent place to start" for newcomers to the series. Dom Peppiatt of VG247 said the demo appeared to be "a remaster in the best sense". In contrast, writing for Polygon, Chelsea Stark criticized the lack of environmental detail in the dungeons, which she described as faithful to the original game but not up to the standards set by Persona 5, and expressed uncertainty about how much would be updated in the final product. Persona 3 Reload was nominated for Most Wanted Game in the 2023 Golden Joystick Awards.

Prior to the game's release, critics expressed mixed to negative views on the Episode Aigis expansion, due to the DLC being tied to the game's Season Pass, in addition to controversy over Wada's prior comments that Reload would be a "complete experience" at launch. Fans review bombed the Expansion Pass on Steam, accusing Atlus of using it as a "cash grab".

=== Post-release critical reception ===
Persona 3 Reload received "generally favorable" reviews from critics, according to review aggregator website Metacritic.

IGN's Michael Higham described the game as "a more fully realized version of a beloved RPG", praising the game's quality of life improvements, voice cast, and soundtrack. PlayStation Universe's Joe Richards complimented the game's blending of the style used in Persona 5 with that of the original game, calling it a "masterclass in design" with "some of the most elegant menus in RPG history". Games reviewers commonly praised Episode Aigis for its plot beats and new music, and criticized its "tedious", "repetitiveness" and poor controls.

Conversely, Reload was criticized by some players and critics, both before and after its release, for omitting certain features from the previous releases of Persona 3, including the choice to play as a female protagonist previously featured in Persona 3 Portable. (Note: Attributed to multiple references:) After Kazuhisa Wada, Reload's producer, stated that the Portable version's added content will not be available due to budgetary reasons, a team of fans began developing a mod called the Femc Reloaded Project, aiming to implement her and content exclusive to her alternate story route from Portable into Reload shortly after the game's release. The mod was published on February 19, 2024, seventeen days after Reload itself was released, and was praised for its functionality and prompt release.

=== Sales ===
Persona 3 Reload sold a million units within its first week of release, making it the fastest-selling game in the series to reach one million units sold and Atlus' fastest-selling game until the release of Metaphor: ReFantazio in October.

By June 2026, Persona 3 Reload had sold over 3 million copies.

=== Awards and nominations ===
Year	Ceremony	Category	Result	Ref.
2023	Golden Joystick Awards	Most Wanted Game	Nominated	
2024	Golden Joystick Awards	Best Supporting Performer (Dawn Bennett)	Nominated	
2024	Japan Game Awards	Award for Excellence	Won	
2025	New York Game Awards	Freedom Tower Award for Best Remake	Nominated	
