= Persona 3 =

2006 video game

- Japanese box art
- Developer: Atlus
- Publishers: JP/NA: Atlus; EU/AU: Koei (PS2); EU: Ghostlight (PSP); WW: Sega (NS, PS4, Win, XBO, XSX)
- Directors: Katsura Hashino; Azusa Kido (Portable)
- Producer: Katsura Hashino
- Designers: Daisuke Kanada; Azusa Kido (Portable)
- Programmers: Hirokazu Tohyama; Nobuyoshi Miwa (Portable)
- Artists: Shigenori Soejima; Kazuhisa Wada; Mumon Usuda (Portable)
- Writers: Yuichiro Tanaka; Azusa Kido (Portable)
- Composer: Shoji Meguro
- Series: Persona
- Platforms: PlayStation 2; PlayStation Portable; Nintendo Switch; PlayStation 4; Windows; Xbox One; Xbox Series X/S
- Release: July 13, 2006: Persona 3; PlayStation 2; JP: July 13, 2006; NA: August 14, 2007; EU: February 29, 2008; AU: March 6, 2008 Persona 3 FES; PlayStation 2; JP: April 19, 2007; NA: April 22, 2008; EU: October 17, 2008; AU: November 13, 2008 Persona 3 Portable; PSP; JP: November 1, 2009; NA: July 6, 2010; EU: April 28, 2011 NS, PS4, Win, XB1, XSX; WW: January 19, 2023
- Genres: Role-playing, social simulation
- Mode: Single-player

Persona 3, (Note: Japanese: ペルソナ3, Hepburn: Perusona Surī) released outside Japan as Shin Megami Tensei: Persona 3, is a 2006 role-playing video game developed by Atlus. It is the fourth main installment in the Persona series. It was originally released for the PlayStation 2 in Japan in 2006 and in North America in 2007. It has received several enhanced re-releases and ports: Persona 3 FES, an extended version featuring a new playable epilogue and other changes, was released for the PlayStation 2 in Japan in 2007 and worldwide in 2008. A PlayStation Portable version, Persona 3 Portable, was released in Japan in 2009, North America in 2010, and Europe in 2011, and ported to the Nintendo Switch, PlayStation 4, Windows, Xbox One and Xbox Series X/S in 2023. Persona 3 Reload, a remake of the core game and epilogue, was released in February 2024 for Windows, PlayStation 4, PlayStation 5, Xbox One and Xbox Series X/S, with a Nintendo Switch 2 release occurring in October 2025.

In Persona 3, the player assumes the role of a high school student who joins the "Specialized Extracurricular Execution Squad" (SEES), a group of students investigating a temporal anomaly known as the "Dark Hour", during which its members can enter Tartarus, a tower containing monsters called Shadows. They battle the Shadows using a physical manifestation of their psyche called a Persona, which they summon by firing a gun-like object called an "Evoker" at their head. Persona 3 incorporates elements of role-playing and simulation games, as the game's protagonist progresses day by day through a school year and forms relationships that improve their Personas' strength in battle.

Reception towards Persona 3 was mainly positive; critics enjoyed its social elements, while some found its combat and environments repetitive. Persona 3 FES's epilogue was said to give narrative closure to the original game, although it was criticized for not featuring its simulation aspects. Persona 3 has also seen other related media, including the fighting games Persona 4 Arena, Persona 4 Arena Ultimax and BlazBlue: Cross Tag Battle, the rhythm game Persona 3: Dancing in Moonlight, the role-playing games Persona Q: Shadow of the Labyrinth and Persona Q2: New Cinema Labyrinth, soundtrack albums, musical concerts, radio dramas, a manga, a loosely connected anime series, and an episodic animated film series.

== Gameplay ==
The protagonist gains academic skills by studying in the school library. The upper-right area of the screen indicates the current date, time period, and phase of the moon.

Persona 3 combines elements of traditional role-playing games and simulation games. The game follows the protagonist, who balances their daily life of going to school and building relationships with others with fighting the monstrous Shadows during the Dark Hour. Each day is divided into daytime and evening segments. Except for scripted events, such as plot progression or special events, the player is free to choose how each day is spent, with most activities causing time to pass. The types of activities and characters that can be interacted with vary depending on the day of the week and time of day. Additionally, some activities are limited by the protagonist's three attributes; Academics, Charm, and Courage, which can be built by performing various activities or making certain correct choices. During the evening, players can choose to visit Tartarus, the game's main dungeon, where they can build their party's experience and gain new items. On the day of the full moon, players will participate in a boss battle to progress the story.

=== Personas and social links ===
The main element of the game is the Personas, creatures and figures associated with the Major Arcana of the Tarot. Each Persona has its own strengths and weaknesses and possesses various abilities, ranging from offensive and supportive abilities to passive abilities that support the character. While each of the game's main characters has their own Persona, some of which evolve during key moments in the story, the protagonist is capable of wielding multiple Personas, which can be switched between battles. New Personas can be created by visiting the Velvet Room and fusing together multiple Personas, with the resulting Persona inheriting certain moves from the Personas used. The current level of the protagonist limits the Personas that a player can create. Personas can also be obtained from Shuffle Time following battles, and previously obtained Personas can be summoned from the Persona Compendium for a fee. The Velvet Room also allows players to complete quests, such as retrieving certain items, for rewards.

Persona 3 introduces social links, (Note: コミュ, komyu, lit. "commu," short for "community") bonds formed with several of the game's characters which each represent a specific Major Arcana. They are ranked up by spending time with characters. When creating a Persona of a particular Arcana, an experience bonus is granted if that Arcana possesses a social link, with greater bonuses awarded depending on the rank. Carrying a Persona of a respective Arcana can help bring a social link closer to increasing in Rank. Maxing out a social link gives players the ability to create specific Personas of each Arcana. Conversely, negative actions, such as choosing incorrect dialogue choices or dating multiple characters at the same time, can result in a reversed or broken social link, with broken links preventing the player character from using Personas of that Arcana in battle until the link is repaired by reconciling with the character.

=== Tartarus and combat ===
A typical battle in Persona 3. The portraits on the right-hand side of the screen indicate the status of the player's party.

Tartarus is the game's main dungeon, which can be visited during the evening if the conditions allow it; for example, the absence of some characters can prevent the player from visiting Tartarus that night. The player may order the other party members to split up to explore the area or automatically attack Shadows on sight. Players will eventually encounter boss floors, in which they must defeat powerful Shadows to continue progressing. Additionally, certain floors halt further progress through the tower until the story progresses. Occasionally, civilians will wander into Tartarus and wind up on certain floors; rescuing them safely before a full moon appears grants bonus rewards. Spending too much time in Tartarus can cause characters to become "Tired" or "Sick," which can affect their performance in combat; certain activities, such as studying at night, may be hindered if the protagonist is afflicted with this status. Players can recover by taking certain items, visiting the infirmary, or going to bed early.

Battle occurs when the player comes into contact with a Shadow, with the battle party consisting of whoever is nearby. Attacking the Shadow without being noticed will give the player an advantage, whilst the enemy gains an advantage if the player is attacked first. Battles use the "Press Turn" system, in which allies and enemies take turns to attack using weapons, items, or Persona abilities. Using the Tactics option, the player can assign specific battle AI to each party member; in Persona 3 Portable, they may also choose to issue direct commands. Offensive attacks are divided into three physical types and six elements, attributes of which both Personas and Shadows may possess strengths and weaknesses against. Physical abilities cost HP and elemental and support magic cost SP. By exploiting an enemy's weakness or performing a critical attack, a character can knock them down to gain an extra turn, which enemies can also do against party members. If the player manages to knock all opponents down, they may be granted the opportunity to perform an All-Out Attack, in which all able party members attack the enemies for massive damage. When a battle is won, players gain experience points that are divided amongst the party members. Earning enough experience allows Personas to increase in level, granting improved stats and new abilities.

== Story ==
=== Setting ===
The story of Persona 3 takes place in 2009 and is set in the Japanese city of Tatsumi Port Island, (Note: 辰巳ポートアイランド) which the Kirijo Corporation built and funded. Experiments conducted ten years prior to the game's events created the Dark Hour, (Note: 影時間, kage jikan, lit. "Shadow Hour") a period of time that exists between days. During the Dark Hour, most people are transmogrified into coffins and are unaware of it; however, there is a select group of people who aren't. In addition, reality is warped; Gekkoukan High School, where most characters attend during the day, becomes a labyrinthine tower called Tartarus, where monsters called Shadows roam the area and prey on the minds of those still conscious, leaving them in near-catatonic states outside of the Dark Hour. The "Specialized Extracurricular Execution Squad," or SEES, was formed by a group of high schoolers to investigate and learn about the Dark Hour, Shadows, and Tartarus. They are capable of summoning beings called Personas to combat Shadows, which the instruction manual describes as being "a second soul that dwells deep within a person's heart. It is an entirely different personality that emerges when a person is confronted with something from outside this world." Persona users usually summon their Persona by firing a gun-like object called an Evoker at their head.

=== Characters ===
The main character of Persona 3 is a silent protagonist the player names at the start of the game, though he is canonically named Makoto Yuki. He is a teenager who, ten years before the game's events, was orphaned as a child following his parents' death, and is now returning to the city he grew up in to transfer to Gekkoukan High School. After learning of his ability to summon a Persona, he joins SEES, whose members include students of the school: Yukari Takeba, a popular and cheerful girl; Junpei Iori, a class clown and his best friend; Akihiko Sanada, a calm and collected senior and the leader of the school's boxing team; and Mitsuru Kirijo, the president of its student council and daughter of the Kirijo Group's leader, who provides support during battle. Over the course of the game, SEES gains several new members: Fuuka Yamagishi, a shy girl who replaces Mitsuru as support; Aigis, a female android the Kirijo Group designed to fight Shadows; Ken Amada, an elementary school student whose mother was accidentally killed by a Persona user; Shinjiro Aragaki, a former member of SEES who quit due to past events; and Koromaru, a dog capable of summoning a Persona.

=== Plot ===
==== The Journey ====
Makoto Yuki transfers to Gekkoukan High School and moves into a dorm in the city. On his third day in the city, during a mysterious 25th hour called the Dark Hour, he is attacked by monstrous beings called Shadows and awakens to his Persona. After defeating them, he is recruited by the Specialized Extracurricular Execution Squad (SEES), a group of Gekkoukan students dedicated to battling the Shadows and exploring Tartarus, a giant tower transformed from Gekkoukan during the Dark Hour. On nights of the full moon, the city is attacked by a Shadow more powerful than those in Tartarus. After several of these incidents, senior SEES member Mitsuru Kirijo is forced to reveal to the team the origin of Tartarus and the Dark Hour. Ten years earlier, the Kirijo Group, a research company Mitsuru's grandfather founded, began amassing and containing Shadows in an attempt to harness their power. However, the experiments went awry, allowing the Shadows to escape and assemble into twelve larger creatures. SEES' leader, Shuji Ikutsuki, informs them that if they defeat the twelve greater Shadows, Tartarus and the Dark Hour will disappear forever.

While vacationing in Yakushima, Makoto meets and recruits Aigis, a Persona-wielding war machine who has an inexplicable need to be near him. After defeating the twelfth and final Shadow, SEES learns that Ikutsuki deceived them. By destroying the greater Shadows, they have freed parts of the being Nyx, also known as the "maternal being", who will bring about the end of the world if fully restored. She is the creator of Shadows, and is drawn to Earth by the Appriser, or "Death". Ikutsuki wishes to sacrifice them, and quicken Nyx's coming. He believes he will become the 'prince' of the new world brought about by her. He is subsequently wounded in a gunfight with Mitsuru's father, Takeharu Kirijo, and jumps from Tartarus to his death.

SEES encounters the Appriser in the form of Ryoji Mochizuki, a recent transfer student to Gekkoukan High School. In December, Aigis and Ryoji reveal that the Shadow experiments performed ten years earlier created the Death Shadow, albeit in an incomplete state. Unable to defeat the Shadow, Aigis sealed it within Makoto, who was a child at the time. Its purpose is to usher Nyx into the world and bring about the extinction of Earth's life. Ryoji insists that Nyx cannot be defeated, but offers SEES an alternative. If they kill him, their memories of the Dark Hour and Tartarus will be erased, allowing them to continue life unaware of their impending death.

On New Year's Eve, the player must decide whether to kill or spare Ryoji. If Makoto kills him, the game cuts to Graduation Day as the members of SEES, except for Aigis, lose their memories of the Dark Hour and the Shadows and live in blissful ignorance until Nyx brings about The Fall and humanity dies. If he is spared, on January 31, SEES ascends to the roof of Tartarus to face him, who has transformed into the Nyx Avatar. While they defeat Nyx Avatar, Nyx continues to descend to Earth. Makoto awakens the power of the "Universe", allowing him to seal away Nyx and return the world to normal. On Graduation Day, Makoto and Aigis go to the school's roof, where Aigis thanks Makoto for giving her a purpose in life: protecting him. Makoto, who has been feeling tired and unwell, then closes his eyes.

==== The Answer ====
The events of "The Answer" begin on March 31, shortly after the end of the original game. The opening sequence reveals that Makoto died at the end of "The Journey", which the other characters speculate is related to him defeating Nyx. The school year has ended, the dormitory is about to be closed, and SEES is drifting apart. During their last dinner party, the SEES members discover they are trapped in their dorm and the day March 31 is repeating. A large door-like hole opens in the dorm floor and SEES is attacked by Metis, an anti-shadow weapon similar to Aigis. While fighting Metis to protect her friends, Aigis awakens to the Wild Card ability, which Makoto previously had. Aigis subdues Metis, whose actions were an attempt to end the time skip and save Aigis, whom she calls her "sister."

Beneath the dormitory is the Abyss of Time, a multi-layered dungeon responsible for the time skips. At the bottom of each dungeon, the characters witness memories of themselves awakening to their Personas. At the bottom of the seventh and final door, SEES fights a Shadow-like version of Makoto, after which each of them receives a key. By combining the keys, they would be able to end the time skip and leave the dorm. However, Metis offers SEES an alternative: they can also use the keys to travel back in time to before the fight against Nyx and Makoto's death. Now unable to agree on how to use the keys, SEES descends into infighting. Aigis and Metis claim all eight keys, which fuse into the Final Key. After debating what to do, they discover a third, new door in the Abyss of Time, which the group uses to travel to when Makoto sealed away Nyx.

Metis explains that the purpose of the seal was not to seal away Nyx herself, but to prevent humanity's despair from calling out to her and bringing about the Fall once more. Their unconscious will to despair and wish for death constantly rebirths the monster Erebus, which summons Nyx to destroy the world; Metis implies that its contact with Nyx caused the Fall. SEES realizes that the wishes that created Erebus also came from them, and so they fight and defeat it. Mitsuru realizes that Erebus will return, as humans will never stop wishing for death. After breaking the time skip and exiting through the dormitory using the Final Key, Metis, Aigis, and the rest of SEES learn that Metis is a manifestation of Aigis' rejected human emotions. Aigis merges with Metis and embraces her humanity, while the members of SEES decide to make the best out of their lives to honor and respect Makoto's sacrifice.

== Development ==
A Japanese ad for Persona 3, created by the game's art director, Shigenori Soejima. The ad "contains three important game elements: school, Persona, and friendship."

Persona 3 began development in 2003, after the completion of Shin Megami Tensei: Nocturne and Digital Devil Saga. In March 2006, the first details on Persona 3 were unveiled in the Japanese gaming magazine Famitsū. In addition to announcing the game's Japanese release date of July 13, the three-page article detailed the game's premise, combat systems, and the social link system (known as "community" in the Japanese version). It also profiled three characters—the protagonist, Junpei, and Yukari—as well as their respective Personas: Orpheus, Hermes and Io.

The main character artist and art director for Persona 3 was Shigenori Soejima. The previous Persona titles' character artist, Kazuma Kaneko, gave the job to Soejima so he could gain more experience. Soejima felt a degree of pressure when designing the characters as he did not want to disappoint the series' fanbase. The goal was to make players of the Megami Tensei series feel gratified that they had supported the Persona series. In an interview, Soejima compared the game's aesthetic and style to a fantastical manga, citing its use of mecha-like Persona and Mitsuru's flamboyant styling. Soejima returned to design the character Metis for FES. The user interface was designed to stand out during the game's marketing, with its blue-colored design intended to evoke a cool and stylish atmosphere. The anime cutscenes for Persona 3 and FES were animated by animation production company Point Pictures.

In an interview with the magazine Play, lead director for Persona 3 Katsura Hashino discussed why the decision was made to have party members be directed by an artificial intelligence: "I think it's more fun to have the party members controlled by their AI, so each member's characteristics and personality are on vivid display. There were no objections raised among the Persona 3 development team, either." He also notes that the system "wasn't well received" by players of the game. Later, the use of AI for the secondary party members was described as a stylistic choice representing the game's theme of conquering the fear of death through "bonds": each character was their own person, and the player could only influence things by interacting with them. Persona 3 does not include the negotiation elements of previous Persona or Megami Tensei games, which allowed players to talk to enemies during a battle to recruit them, earn money, or obtain items. However, the social elements of Persona 3 (and its successor, Persona 4) are considered the equivalent of the negotiation system by the development team. Maragos said in a 1UP.com interview that "negotiation isn't gone...And [it] still factors into Persona Fusion; it's still a big part of the game. I feel like it's disguised, but it's there."

=== Localization ===
The localization of Persona 3 was handled by Yu Namba and Nich Maragos. During this process, the team worked to leave as much of the original Japanese content intact, continuing a trend started with Persona 2: Eternal Punishment. One of the ideas had by the team for Persona 3 was to use it as a medium for introducing Japanese culture to a Western audience. While localizing Persona 3 for English-speaking countries, the honorifics used by the characters in the original Japanese script were retained. According to Maragos, their use "[added] so much more meaning to the text". In an interview with RPGamer, project editor Yu Namba explained that during the process of translation, some of the Japanese humor, "things that made absolutely no sense in western culture…were replaced with jokes that at least somewhat parallel the originals." One of the changes that needed to be made was to the school tests, which were based around questions on the English language. A similar change was Mitsuru's second language: in the original version it was English, but for the localized version her second language was changed to French. This choice was influenced by her cultured appearance. In addition, in-game references to the original Shin Megami Tensei were altered to references to Persona 2.

=== Music ===
The original soundtrack for Persona 3 was composed by Shoji Meguro, with Yumi Kawamura as the main vocalist and Lotus Juice as the sub vocalist. It was released as a two disc soundtrack in Japan by Aniplex on July 19, 2006. A selection of tracks from the full soundtrack was bundled with the North American release of the game. An arranged album, titled Burn My Dread -Reincarnation: Persona 3-, was also released in Japan by Aniplex on April 18, 2007. It contains eleven arrangements of tracks from Persona 3, as well as an extended version of the song "Burn My Dread." Meguro stated that the development of Persona 3 was one of his first opportunities to fully realize his music in video games. The soundtrack features a high use of vocals. A tune from previous Persona games he brought back was "Aria of the Soul", the theme of the Velvet Room. The game's battle theme, "Mass Destruction", was originally just a prototype, but the reception to it was so positive that it went into the final game. In the past, the hardware limitations of the original PlayStation required him to compose music in 100-200 kilobyte samples, which he felt made the music sound "pretty cheap". The move to the PlayStation 2 allowed for real-time streaming of music. Meguro considers this "the point at which [he] was finally able to express [his] music without making any compromises". He was also worried about the pronunciation of the English lyrics.

Meguro returned to compose new music for Persona 3 FES. Released in Japan by Aniplex on May 3, 2007, the soundtrack contained the original score for FES, as well as arrangements of music from earlier games in the Persona series. "The Snow Queen", composed by Kenichi Tsuchiya, is a remix of the theme in Revelations: Persona. "Maya's Theme", composed by Kenichi Tsuchiya, and "Time Castle", composed by Toshiko Tasaki, are remixes of tracks from Persona 2: Innocent Sin. Persona 3 Portable contains new background music, which can be heard if the player chooses to control the game's new female protagonist, with Mayumi Fujita as the main vocalist. The game's official soundtrack was released in Japan by Aniplex on November 25, 2009.

== Promotion and release ==
The North American release of Persona 3 shipped as a collector's edition box containing the game, a soundtrack disc, and a 52-page art book. The game was originally scheduled to release on July 24, 2007. However, Atlus encountered a problem with manufacturing the artbook several days before the intended ship date. Instead of shipping the game without the book, the company decided to push its release back three weeks, to August 14. Atlus issued a press release explaining that they were delaying the game to maintain the quality of the package, which would have been "irreparably compromised" if they had "revise[d] or abandon[ed] the deluxe package."

=== Persona 3 FES ===
Persona 3 FES (Note: ペルソナ3フェス, Perusona Surī Fesu) is an expanded version of Persona 3 that contains updates to the original game (referred to as The Journey, or Episode Yourself in the Japanese version), a new Hard difficulty option, and a new epilogue in which the player controls Aigis (titled The Answer, or Episode Aegis in the Japanese version). The core gameplay of The Answer is similar to that of The Journey, although the daily life system has been removed with the player no longer attending school. Players of the original Persona 3 are also given the option of transferring certain data from the original version's save file, such as the player's compendium, social-related stats, and maxed social link items. According to the game's director, Katsura Hashino, the subtitle "Fes" is derived from the word "festival".

Persona 3 FES was first released alongside the original game in two forms: the "Regular Edition" — containing both the "director's cut" version of Persona 3, and the new epilogue on a standalone disc, and the "Append Edition", which has the same content but requires the original Persona 3 disc to be inserted before playing initially, and after creating save data it can be played alone. These editions were released simultaneously in Japan on April 19, 2007.

At the time, Atlus had no apparent plans to release FES outside Japan. Confirmation did not come until February 2008, when the game's North American release date was revealed to be April 22, 2008. The European edition by Koei followed on October 17, 2008. For its Korean release, the game was localized by Sony Computer Entertainment Korea.

An exclusive Amazon.com limited edition bundle was released on November 28, 2008, containing the FES edition of the game along with the same Art of Persona 3 artbook and Persona 3 soundtrack disc that were packaged with the North American release of the original game.

The FES edition of the game was released on PSN on April 10, 2012, as a PS2 Classic for the PlayStation 3.

=== Persona 3 Portable ===
Persona 3 Portable (Note: ペルソナ3 ポータブル, Perusona Surī Pōtaburu), an enhanced remaster of Persona 3 for the PlayStation Portable, was released in Japan on November 1, 2009, and released in North America on July 6, 2010. It was released to the majority of Europe on April 29, 2011, and the UK on April 28, 2011. The announcement in Famitsū revealed that the player would have the option to play as a female protagonist. This selection alters some aspects of the story: the first Persona gained by the protagonist, Orpheus, has a different appearance and Igor's assistant in the Velvet Room, Elizabeth, can be replaced with a male equivalent named Theodore. The gender choice also alters some aspects of the social link stories. In addition to the new playable character, there are two new difficulty levels to select from alongside the original game and FES's three. Persona 3 Portable only includes the story of the original Persona 3, otherwise referred to as "The Journey"; however, general changes have been made to the plot, regardless of character choice.

The game's revised battle system draws on elements added in Persona 3's successor, Persona 4. In combat, the player is able to directly control every character, as an alternative to utilizing the game's artificial intelligence. The ability to guard has been added, and allies will take fatal attacks for the protagonist, preventing their death. Outside of Tartarus, instead of navigating the game world by directly controlling the protagonist, the player guides an on-screen cursor around an area, allowing interaction with characters and objects. The game includes the voice acting of the original game, although characters are not shown in the world, instead being represented by on-screen portraits. In addition, the anime cutscenes seen in the original Persona 3 were replaced to feature in-game graphics. Shoji Meguro composed 10 new musical tracks for Persona 3 Portable; with the majority of them being written for the female protagonist's playthrough. Several cameos of characters from other Atlus games were added to Persona 3 Portable, including Yukiko Amagi from Persona 4 and Vincent Brooks from Catherine.

Persona 3 Portable was released as a stand-alone game and as part of a bundle package, which included a T-shirt and desk calendar. In North America, Atlus U.S.A. offered Junpei's baseball cap as a pre-order bonus. For the European release, Ghostlight was in charge of releasing it. In South Korea, the game was released by Sony Computer Entertainment Korea with a limited edition Turquoise Green PSP while the game alone was also sold on February 12, 2010.

A port of Persona 3 Portable was released for Nintendo Switch, PlayStation 4, Windows, Xbox One and Xbox Series X/S on January 19, 2023. Limited Run Games announced that September that they would distribute special physical versions of Persona 3 Portable for PlayStation 4, Nintendo Switch and Xbox consoles in limited quantities alongside a similar release for Persona 4 Golden on the aforementioned platforms. Limited Run will release three variations of Persona 3 Portable's physical version, including a standard physical copy, a "Grimoire Edition" that packages the game in a special SteelBook case, a Grimoire Book box and slipcover, and a "S.E.E.S. Edition" that additionally comes with a replica of the Evoker used by the main party to summon Personas, as well as a 3D shadow box that depicts the cut-in graphic for the All-Out Attack sequence. Pre-orders for the physical releases went live on September 29, 2023, and remained active until November 12, 2023.

== Reception ==
=== Critics ===
Reception

Aggregate score
Aggregator	Score
Metacritic	86/100; 89/100 (FES); 89/100 (PSP); 81/100 (PC); 80/100 (PS4); 87/100 (XSXS); 81/100 (NS)

Review scores
Publication	Score
1Up.com	A− A (FES)
Famitsu	33/40; 32/40 (PSP)
Game Informer	8.5/10 (FES)
GameSpot	8.5/10; 8.5/10 (FES)
GameSpy	4.5/5; 4.5/5 (FES)
GamesRadar+	9/10
GameTrailers	9/10
Hardcore Gamer	4/5 (NS)
IGN	8.3/10; 8.8/10 (FES)
Nintendo Life	7/10 (NS)
Nintendo World Report	8/10 (NS)
PC Gamer (US)	80/100 (PC)
Push Square	8/10 (PS4)

Awards
Publication	Award
Famitsu	RPG of the Year
GameSpot	RPG of the Year
GameSpy	PS2 RPG of the Year
RPGamer	RPG of the Decade
RPGFan	RPG of the Year

Persona 3 received positive reviews upon its release, earning a Metacritic score of 86. Shane Bettenhausen of 1UP.com called the game a "refreshingly new take on the MegaTen [Megami Tensei] concept", and "the best RPG hitting the PS2 this year." He praised the "excellent" AI created to direct the actions of party members during battle, which he felt created "the series' speediest and most dynamic battle system to date." Jeff Haynes from IGN criticized the system, finding that it would occasionally result in the death of the player's character, which causes a game over.

GameTrailers called the game "a rare supernatural delicacy", stating it is an RPG that fans of the genre shouldn't miss out on. GameSpy's Patrick Joynt praised the social elements of Persona 3, calling the game's social links "almost universally fascinating." While he suspected the simulation elements would "probably be the biggest hurdle" for fans of role-playing or Megami Tensei games, in his review, he wrote that he "can't stress enough how well-done it is." Heidi Kemps of GamesRadar found the game's teenage themes to be "a refreshing change" from those of other games in the genre, as they touch on "the social awkwardness common at that point in life." Game Informer's Joe Juba found the game's environments to be weak, as "most of the game takes place within one tower [Tartarus]." In his review, he also noted that the game's roots in the Megami Tensei series would come across as foreign to new players. "If you don't know anything about fusing Personas, or simply that 'bufu' means 'ice attack,' you have some catching up to do."

Persona 3 FES received a score of 89 on Metacritic, slightly higher than that of Persona 3. The plot of The Answer provides "much-needed narrative closure" to the story of The Journey, according to Shane Bettenhausen. Kevin VanOrd called FES a "wonderfully enhanced version of an already-great RPG"; in his review, he recommends the game to new players and those who had already finished the original game. The gameplay of The Answer was criticized by several reviewers for not including the social elements of the original game. VanOrd found the new chapter to be "less interesting" because of this. Jeff Haynes commented that the change "harkens back to a classic, more hardcore RPG experience of fighting and grinding", while done at the expense of what "made Persona 3 so intriguing in the first place." The reviews of GameSpy and IGN reiterated issues found with the original game, such as the inability to directly control party members in battle.

While some critics like IGN criticized Persona 3 Portable for "losing some of its polish", it was as acclaimed as FES, receiving an 89 out of 100 from Metacritic, making it the third best reviewed PSP game on the website. It was praised for, despite having been released twice already, being an adventure worth playing again. This was echoed by GamesRadar, IGN, 1UP.com and GamePro. One of the reviewers from Famitsu wrote that the remake includes "enough differences in the Social Links to make it fun even for old players.", and perfect scores from websites such as Destructoid and GamePro. GameTrailers went on to nominate the game for "Best PSP Game" in their awards, losing to God of War: Ghost of Sparta and "Best RPG", losing to Mass Effect 2. Three websites specific to coverage of RPGs honored it in annual award postings, namely RPGamer (Best Re-release), RPGFan (Best Traditional RPG on Handheld), and RPGLand (Best Port).

Shane Bettenhausen of 1Up.com considered the inclusion of Evokers "a ballsy and shocking move" on the part of Atlus, but felt their inclusion created "an edgy sensibility that fits perfectly with the overall dark tone" of the game. Similarly, Joe Juba thought the concept fit "perfectly" with the game's "dark tone". Jeff Haynes writing for IGN found the animations of characters using their Evokers to be "intriguing and shocking at the same time". While previewing Persona 3 for GameSpot, Kevin VanOrd said that the continued use of Evokers "never gets old and it never gets any less awesome to watch, and considering that you could play this for fifty, sixty, seventy, eighty hours or more, that's saying something." Atlus USA did not remove the Evokers from Persona 3 for its worldwide release, despite the possible controversy. Nich Maragos from the localization team said on 1UP.com's Retronauts podcast that the company did not receive any criticism for their inclusion. "There was never any Jack Thompson-ing…we didn't get any letters from concerned parents."

The PC, PlayStation 4, Xbox Series X/S and Switch versions of Persona 3 Portable received "generally favorable reviews", according to Metacritic.

=== Sales and accolades ===
Persona 3 sold 127,472 copies in its first week and 210,319 copies overall in Japan by 2008. Persona 3 Portable sold over 158,000 copies in Japan within its first month of release.

Persona 3 was named the best role-playing game of 2006 by Famitsu, and of 2007 by GameSpot and RPGFan. GameSpy gave the title its 2007 PS2 RPG of the Year award and placed it second in the 2007 PS2 Top 10 Games of the Year. Persona 3 was nominated for Best RPG at the 2007 Spike Video Game Awards, but lost to Mass Effect. 1UP.com's 2007 game awards, which ran in the March 2008 issue of Electronic Gaming Monthly, included Persona 3, given the award for "Most controversial game that created no controversy".

IGN placed Persona 3 FES fifteenth in their feature "The Top 25 PS2 Games of All Time". In 2010, Persona 3 was listed first on RPGamer's "Top RPGs of the Decade" list, and second place in RPGFan's "Top 20 RPGs of the Past Decade" list.

== Legacy ==
An internet meme about a typo turning the game's signature song "Burn My Dread" into "Burn My Bread" went viral.

=== Spin-offs and tie-ins ===
Persona Q: Shadow of the Labyrinth is a dungeon crawler RPG developed for the Nintendo 3DS. It features both the characters from Persona 3 and the ones from Persona 4 and includes some gameplay elements from the Etrian Odyssey series. The Persona 3 campaign starts two weeks before October 4. Just as SEES prepares to enter Tartarus that night, they are pulled into the Velvet Room and sent to a school they have never seen before. While searching the area, they meet the amnesiacs Zen and Rei and the Investigation Team, the latter of whom have also been pulled into the strange school: they must now work together to escape. The game was released in Japan on June 5, 2014, North America on November 25, 2014, and Europe on November 28, 2014.

The fighting game Persona 4 Arena and its sequel Persona 4 Arena Ultimax continue the story of the SEES members.

A rhythm game based on the setting and characters of Persona 3, titled Persona 3: Dancing in Moonlight, was released for the PlayStation 4 and PlayStation Vita in Japan in May 2018 and worldwide in December 2018, alongside Persona 5: Dancing in Starlight. (Note: PlayStation Vita (In western countries, the game received no physical copies and was only sold on the PlayStation Store for the PlayStation Vita))

Persona Q2: New Cinema Labyrinth serves as a sequel to Persona Q. The game was released for the Nintendo 3DS in Japan on November 29, 2018, and worldwide on June 4, 2019. The game retains the casts from Persona 3 and Persona 4, joined by the Phantom Thieves of Hearts from Persona 5 and the female protagonist from Persona 3 Portable.

=== Remake ===
Persona 3 Reload is a remake of Persona 3 created in Unreal Engine 4, and was released on February 2, 2024, for PlayStation 4, PlayStation 5, Windows, Xbox One and Xbox Series X/S, with a Nintendo Switch 2 release occurring on October 23, 2025. It was announced on June 11, 2023, after footage of it had leaked in April 2023.

Producer Ryouta Niizuma stated the team prioritized remaking the original Persona 3 and excluded the epilogue from FES and the female protagonist from Portable. However, "The Answer" epilogue was added later under the name "Episode Aigis" via downloadable content. The English release features a predominantly new voice cast, with the exception being Tara Platt, who voiced Mitsuru and Elizabeth in the original reprising her role as the latter.

=== Related media ===
==== Merchandise ====
Several figurines of the characters have been produced by Kotobukiya, a Japanese collectible toy company. They include the protagonist of the game, Aigis, Mitsuru, and Akihiko. The figurines have interchangeable parts, such as an Evoker or weapon, which can be stored in the base. Alter, another Japanese company that specializes in collectibles, has also released 1:8 scale figurines of Elizabeth, Aigis, and Mitsuru. The headphones worn by the protagonist are sold by Audio-Technica, model ATH-EM700(Japan-only version). Atlus collaborated with the Japanese publishing company Enterbrain to publish the game's multiple strategy guides and an artbook detailing character and setting designs.

==== Manga ====
A manga adaptation of Persona 3 written and illustrated by Shūji Sogabe was published monthly in the Japanese magazine Dengeki Maoh until it went on hiatus once Persona 4 was released. However, it began serialization again starting November 7, 2011, moving from Dengeki Maoh to Atlus's official Persona Magazine. As of February 2017, 11 volumes have been released.

==== Anime ====
A non-canonical spin-off anime to the Persona series titled Persona: Trinity Soul aired in Japan starting in January 2008 and ran for twenty-six episodes. Despite being a standalone installment in the franchise, the anime takes place ten years after the events of Persona 3 and borrows certain plot elements, featuring Akihiko as a secondary character and the usage of Persona suppressors. NIS America licensed the show and released it in two half-season deluxe edition box sets with the original Japanese audio track in 2010.

==== Films ====
In June 2012, it was announced that Persona 3 would receive a four-part film series adaptation. It was produced by AIC ASTA (first film) and A-1 Pictures (films two through four). The first film was directed by Noriaki Akitaya, the second and fourth by Tomohisa Taguchi, and the third by Keitaro Motonaga. The main Japanese voice actors from the original game reprised their roles in the film series.

==== Radio drama ====
Several series of radio dramas based on Persona 3 and Persona 3 FES have been released in Japan. Persona 3 Drama CD: A Certain Day of Summer features an original story voiced by the game's original cast. Persona 3 Drama CD Vol. 2 -Moonlight- links the story of Persona 3 and the epilogue released with Persona 3 FES. From February to June 2008, a series of character dramas were released as five CDs. The volumes respectively focus on the protagonist and Ryoji; Junpei and Chidori; Fuuka, Ken, and Aigis; Yukari and Mitsuru; and Akihiko, Shinjiro, and Koromaru. In early 2009, a two-volume side story about Mitsuru was released.

==== Stage production ====
Persona 3 was adapted into five live stage musicals, with the first one performed in 2014. The series of plays were first announced in August 2013 and were written by Kumagai and Kotora Kagurazuka, with music by Meguro. The plays included separate shows for both the male and female protagonists, who were named Sakuya Shiomi and Kotone Shiomi, and had minor dialogue and scenes unique to each protagonist. The plays starred Shouta Aoi as Sakuya, Kana Asumi as Kotone, Maho Tomita as Yukari, Genki Okawa as Junpei, Yuki Fujiwara as Akihiko, Asami Tano as Mitsuru, Marina Tanoue as Fuuka, ZAQ as Aigis, and Waku Sakaguchi and Tomonori Suzuki as Ken. The musicals were also broadcast live on Niconico and a behind-the-scenes special aired on Tokyo MX.

The first play, Persona 3: The Weird Masquerade: The Blue Awakening ran from January 8–12, 2014, at Theater G Rosso, and was given a home release on May 14, 2014. The Blue Awakening followed events up to Fuuka's inclusion into the party.

The Blue Awakening was followed up with a sequel, Persona 3: The Weird Masquerade: The Ultramarine Labyrinth, which ran from September 16–24, 2014, at Theater 1010 and was given a home release on January 28, 2015. The play follows in-game events from July to early November. Richard Eisenbeis from Kotaku reviewed the play favorably, approving of its casting and special effects, but felt that the musical numbers were "out of place" and the protagonists had "zero personality."

A third musical, titled Persona 3: The Weird Masquerade: The Bismuth Crystals ran from June 5–13, 2015, and was given a home release on September 30, 2015. The fourth and fifth stage plays, Persona 3: The Weird Masquerade: Act 4: Indigo Pledge and Persona 3: The Weird Masquerade: Final Act: Beyond the Blue Sky, ran from April 14–23, 2017.

==== Ice show ====
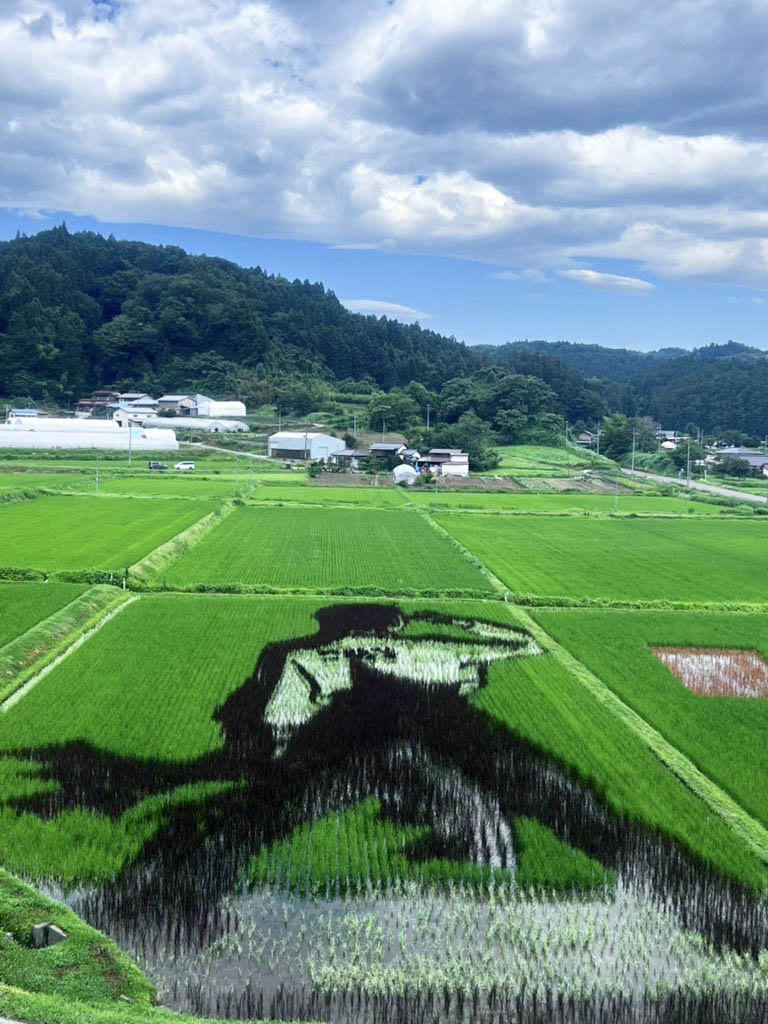
Rice Paddy Art inspired by Yuzuru Hanyu "Mass Destruction" program in Kakuda, Miyagi, Japan

The songs Battle Hymn of the Soul, and the Persona 3 Reload version of Mass Destruction, were used in 'Yuzuru Hanyu Ice Story 3rd Echoes of Life Tour', an ice show written, produced and performed by two-time Olympic figure skating champion Yuzuru Hanyu, and directed by the Japanese choreographer and director Mikiko.

On June 1, 2025, the Nishine Rice Paddy Art Enjoyment Association of Kakuda City, Miyagi Prefecture announced that the 2025 design would be a memorable scene from Hanyu's Mass Destruction program, where he points to his head to summon his persona.
