= Hikaru Midorikawa =

Japanese voice actor (born 1968)

- 緑川 光
- Born: May 2, 1968 (age 58); Ōtawara, Japan
- Other names: Green River Light; GRL
- Occupation: Voice actor
- Years active: 1988–present
- Agent: Aoni Production

Hikaru Midorikawa (緑川 光, Midorikawa Hikaru; born May 2, 1968) is a Japanese voice actor from Otawara, Tochigi who is represented by Aoni Production. He is best known for the roles of Softon in Bobobo-bo Bo-bobo, Tamahome in Fushigi Yûgi, Seiran Shi in Saiunkoku Monogatari, Gridman in Gridman the Hyper Agent, Heero Yuy in Mobile Suit Gundam Wing, Kaede Rukawa in Slam Dunk, Ayato Sakamaki in Diabolik Lovers, Rantaro Amami in Danganronpa V3: Killing Harmony, Zelgadis Greywords in Slayers, Ryuho in s-CRY-ed, Ein/Hayate from the Dead or Alive series, Marth from the Fire Emblem series, Akihiko Sanada from Persona 3, Lancer from Fate/Zero, Kyōsuke Natsume from Little Busters!, Sakamoto from Haven't You Heard? I'm Sakamoto, Zora Ideale from Black Clover, Kouga from Saint Seiya Omega, Ensign Nogami from The Cockpit, Garou from One-Punch Man, Cherry Blossom from SK8 the Infinity, and Lilia Vanrouge from Disney: Twisted-Wonderland.

== Career ==
Midorikawa debuted as a voice actor in 1988 with his role as Murai from Be-Bop High School. He is one of the most well-known and prolific voice actors in Japan, with more than 200 anime credits and close to 70 game credits in his two-decade career. He is known for voicing bishounen characters, such as Lancer in Fate/Zero, Kyōsuke Natsume in Little Busters! and Little Busters! Refrain, Eiichi Ōtori in Uta no☆Prince-sama♪ Maji Love 2000%, Rukawa Kaede in Slam Dunk, Ayato Sakamaki in Diabolik Lovers, and Edgar Ashenbert in Earl and Fairy. He has also voiced Tsunagu Hakamada (aka Best Jeanist) in My Hero Academia and Vidaldus Taka in Fairy Tail.

Midorikawa is also a J-Pop artist and was a member in several bands including Zero Phoenix and E.M.U. (Entertainment Music Unit) from the mid-1990s until the early 2000s. E.M.U. was formed by five voice actors from the radio drama Sotsugyou M (Male Graduation). The other members are Nobutoshi Canna (previously Hayashi), Ryōtarō Okiayu, Hideo Ishikawa, and Daisuke Sakaguchi. During their run from 1995 to 2000, the group released 8 CDs and four singles. Shortly before E.M.U. disbanded, Midorikawa joined his fellow voice actor and friend, Nobutoshi Canna, to create a new group, Zero Phoenix. The duo released one CD, titled "Kirameki".

His voice ranges between E2 and A4 (slightly B4). While singing, he ranges between C or D.

Midorikawa managed his own blog and is an avid gamer. He is a big fan of Super Robot Wars, having a blog entry on the SRW site; he is one of a few people to have a blog on Banpresto's "Supalog" website. As an SRW fan, Midorikawa does extra lines for his characters for free and sometimes acts as a beta tester for new games in the franchise. Usually the characters he is cast to play turn into one-man armies, namely Heero and Masaki in Super Robot Wars and Xingke in Code Geass.

== Filmography ==
=== Anime ===
List of voice performances in anime
Year	Title	Role	Notes	Source
1989	Akuma-kun	Mummy		
1989	Dragon Ball Z	Android 16, Paikuhan, Gassh		
1990	Be-Bop High School	Murai	Debut role	
1991	Future GPX Cyber Formula series	Naoki Shinjyo		
1991	Mermaid Forest	Soldier	OVA	
1991	Dragon Quest: Dai no Daibōken	Derorin		
1991	Yokoyama Mitsuteru Sangokushi	Emperor Xian of Han		
1991–1993	Here is Greenwood	Tochizawa	OVA	
1991	Vampire Wars	Bellboy		
1991	Slow Step	Yoshio Somei		
1991–1992	3×3 Eyes	Hide		
1992	Crayon Shin-chan	Kimura		
1992	Super Bikkuriman	Rojin Hood		
1992	Papuwa	Shintaro		
1992–1993	Kōryū Densetsu Villgust	Yūta		
1993	The Brave Express Might Gaine	Joe Rival		
1993	Sailor Moon	Ail / Seijūrō Ginga		
1993	Mobile Suit Victory Gundam	Lee Ron		
1993	Ocean Waves	Tadashi Yamao		
1993–1994	Mashin Hero Wataru: Warinaki Toki no Monogatari	King Yamira		
1993–1996	Slam Dunk	Kaede Rukawa		
1993	The Cockpit	Ensign Nogami	OVA ep. 2	
1993	Aoki Densetsu Shoot!	Toshihiko Tanaka		
1994	Marmalade Boy	Michael		
1994	Mobile Fighter G Gundam	Izoku B, Guy B		
1994–1995	Maps	Gen Tokishima	OVA	
1994	Shinken Densetsu Tight Road	Masaki Yasuto		
1994	Bounty Dog	Kei Mimura		
1994	Ghost Sweeper Mikami	Male student	Ep. 12	
1995	Ninku	Genbu		
1995–2002	Fushigi Yûgi	Tamahome, Taka Sukunami	also in OVA series	
1995	Mobile Suit Gundam Wing	Heero Yuy		
1995–1997, 2008–2009	Slayers series	Zelgadis Greywords		
1995	Ruin Explorers	Lyle	OVA	
1995	Fire Emblem: Mystery of the Emblem	Marth	OVA	
1996	Saber Marionette J series	Gelhardt von Faust	J, J Again, J to X	
1996	Earthian	Messiah	OVA ep 4	
1997	Maze	Jifa		
1997	Revolutionary Girl Utena	Sōji Mikage		
1997	Kindaichi Case Files	Masayuki Onodera		
1997–1998	Pokémon	Daisuke (episode 11), Kōmu (episode 75)		
1997	Flame of Recca	Tokiya Mikagami		
1997	Gestalt	Shazan		
1997	Hyper Speed GranDoll	Freedsharlf		
1998	Cowboy Bebop	Lin, Shin		
1998	Lost Universe	Rail Claymore		
1998	Yu-Gi-Oh!	Seto Kaiba		
1998	Alice SOS	Shono SurudoIchiro		
1998	Weiß Kreuz	Schuldig		
1998	Gundam Wing: Endless Waltz	Heero Yuy	OVA	
1998	Rainbow of Senki Iris	Rick		
1998	Outlaw Star	Tobigera		
1999	Space Pirate Mito	Carson		
1999	Angel Links	Kosei Hida		
1999	Great Teacher Onizuka	Yoshito Kikuchi		
1999	10 Tokyo Warriors	Jutto	OVA series	
2000	Shinzo	Gabriela		
2000	Gatekeepers	Nishitani / black clothes		
2000	Brigadoon: Marin & Melan	Makoto Alo, Ruru		
2001	Star Ocean EX	Allen		
2001	Final Fantasy: Unlimited	Clear		
2001	s-CRY-ed	Ryuho		
2001–2022	Shaman King	Silva, Patch Hao		
2001	The SoulTaker	Bud Isaac		
2002	Tenchi Muyo! GXP	Misao Kuramitsu		
2002	Tokyo Mew Mew	Keiichiro Akasaka		
2002	Digimon Frontier	Angemon		
2002	Atashin'chi	Iwaki-kun		
2002	Wild 7 Another	Hiba		
2002	Samurai Deeper Kyo	Migeira		
2002	Gravion	Raven	Also Zwei	
2003	Air Master	Koji Ogata		
2003	Astro Boy	Zedo		
2003	Zatch Bell!	Dufort		
2003	Detective School Q	Sir Anubis		
2003	Saint Beast	Houou no Luka		
2003	Triangle Heart: Sweet Songs Forever	Kyōya Takamachi	OVA series	
2003–2004	Godannar series	Knight Valentine		
2003–2004	The Galaxy Railways	David Young, Mamoru Yuuki		
2003	Bobobo-bo Bo-bobo	Softon		
2004	Area 88	Satoru Kanzaki		
2004	Sgt. Frog	R Gray		
2004	Tsuki wa Higashi ni Hi wa Nishi ni: Operation Sanctuary	Naoki Kuzumi		
2004–2005	Beet the Vandel Buster	Zenon	Also Excellion	
2004	Kakyusei 2	Parent Namiba		
2004–2005	Magical Girl Lyrical Nanoha	Kyōya Takamachi	Also A's	
2004	Ring ni Kakero 1 series	Scorpion		
2004	Black Jack	Mahisabu Rokuro		
2004	Yakitate!! Japan	Shizuto Narumi		
2004–2005	Maple Colors series	Saku Yoshijiro	OVA Adult; As Hikaru	
2005	Xenosaga: The Animation	Wilhelm		
2005	Sukisho	Sora Hashiba		
2005	Naruto	Arashi Fuma		
2005	Super Robot Wars Original Generation: The Animation	Masaki Andoh	OVA ep. 2	
2006	Ayakashi: Samurai Horror Tales	Zushonosuke Himekawa		
2006	Air Gear	Kaito Wanijima		
2006	Gintama	Ketsuno Seimei		
2006	Love Get Chu: Miracle Seiyū Hakusho	Minato Ichinose		
2006–2007	The Story of Saiunkoku series	Seiran Si		
2006	Demonbane	Master Therion		
2006	Powerpuff Girls Z	Piano monster		
2006	Super Robot Wars Original Generation: Divine Wars	Masaki Andoh		
2006	The Galaxy Railways: Crossroads to Eternity	David Young, Mamoru Yuki		
2006	The Galaxy Railways: A Letter from the Abandoned Planet	David Young		
2007	GeGeGe no Kitaro	Kurokarasu	5th TV series	
2007	Saint Beast: Kouin Jojishi Tenshi Tan	Houou no Luka		
2007	Mononoke	Man in Fox Mask		
2007–2009	Clannad	Yusuke Yoshino	Also in After Story.	
2007	Hatara Kizzu Maihamu Gumi	Sekhmet		
2008	Persona: Trinity Soul	Akihiko Sanada		
2008	Kyo Kara Maoh!	Densham von Karbelnikoff	Season 3	
2008	Code Geass: Lelouch of the Rebellion R2	Li Xingke		
2008	Hakushaku to Yōsei	Edgar J. C. Ashenbert		
2009	Lupin the 3rd vs. Detective Conan	Keith Dan Stinger	TV crossover movie	
2009	Dragon Ball Kai	Tenshinhan, Android 16		
2009	Yumeiro Patissiere	Hanabusa's Father		
2009	Anyamaru Tantei Kiruminzuu	Hatori Shiro		
2010	Fairy Tail	Vidaldus Taka		
2010	Katanagatari	Hakuhei Sabi		
2010	HeartCatch PreCure!	Dune		
2010	Angel Beats!	Fish Saitou		
2010	Super Robot Wars Original Generation: The Inspector	Masaki Andoh		
2010	Togainu no Chi	Shiki		
2010	Starry Sky	Tomoe Yoh		
2011	Bakugan: Gundalian Invaders	Gill		
2011	Digimon Xros Wars	Splashmon		
2011–2012	Beyblade: Metal Fury	Dynamis		
2011	Sekai-ichi Hatsukoi series	Kanade Mino		
2011	Nura: Rise of the Yokai Clan - Demon Capital	Hidemoto Keikain		
2011–2013	YuruYuri series	Ganbo	Also ♪♪ and high	
2011–2012	Fate/Zero series	Lancer		
2012	Natsume's Book of Friends	Houdzuki-gami		
2012	Brave 10	Ishida Mitsunari		
2012–2014	Kenichi: The Mightiest Disciple specials	Kurando Yakabe		
2012–2014	Saint Seiya Omega	Pegasus Kōga		
2012	Zumomo to Nupepe	Zumomo		
2012	Shining Hearts	Ragnus		
2012	Battle Spirits: Sword Eyes	Midnight Sun King Yaiba		
2012	Little Busters! series	Kyosuke Natsume	Also Refrain and OVAs	
2012	Kono Danshi, Ningyo Hiroimashita	Isaki	OVA; Theme song performance: "Umi yori Aoku"	
2013–2016	Uta no Prince-sama series	Ōtori Eiichi		
2013	Majestic Prince	Jiart		
2013	Photo Kano	Kudou Hiromichi		
2013	Recorder and Randsell Mi ☆	Yoshioka's older brother		
2013	Tamayura: More Aggressive	Nozomu Natsume		
2013–2015	Diabolik Lovers series	Sakamaki Ayato	Also More Blood	
2014	Majin Bone	Revolt		
2014	The Kawai Complex Guide to Manors and Hostel Behavior	Yamamoto (Hojo)		
2014	World Trigger	Sōya Kazama		
2014	Bonjour♪Sweet Love Patisserie	Yoshinosuke Suzumi		
2015	Blood Blockade Battlefront	Zed O'Brien		
2015	Rin-ne	Rinne's grandfather		
2015–2016	Rainy Cocoa series	Keiichi Iwase		
2015	Charlotte	Saito		
2015	Dragon Ball Super	Tenshinhan		
2015	Young Black Jack	Treasure		
2015	The Asterisk War series	Madiasu Mesa		
2015	Shin Atashin'chi	Iwaki		
2015	World Break: Aria of Curse for a Holy Swordsman	Lu Zhixin		
2016	Active Raid series	Kotaro Inagi		
2016	Haven't You Heard? I'm Sakamoto	Sakamoto		
2016	First Love Monster	Daikoku Nikaidō		
2016	Servamp	Rosen Kranz (クランツ・ローゼン)		
2017	Chain Chronicle ~Light of Haecceitas~	Shuza		
2017	ACCA: 13-Territory Inspection Dept.	Pastis		
2017	Rewrite	Mikuni	season 2	
2017	Tama Pawns	Manager, Momonga, Fox's grandfather	web series shorts	
2017	My Hero Academia 2	Best Jeanist		
2017	Nana Maru San Batsu	Seiji Fukami		
2017	Sengoku Night Blood	Kagemochi Amakasu		
2018	SSSS.Gridman	Gridman		
2018	Zoku Touken Ranbu:Hanamaru	Juzumaru Tsunetsugu		
2019	Domestic Girlfriend	Kiriya Reiji		
2019	Demon Slayer: Kimetsu no Yaiba	Temple Demon		
2019	My Hero Academia 3	Best Jeanist		
2019	One-Punch Man 2	Garou		
2019	Black Clover	Zora Ideale		
2019	Ensemble Stars!	Eichi Tenshouin		
2019	Actors: Songs Connection	Ichijodani Rei		
2020	The Misfit of Demon King Academy	Eldora Zaia		
2020	Our Last Crusade or the Rise of a New World	Lord Mask		
2021	SK8 the Infinity	Cherry Blossom		
2021	My Hero Academia 5	Best Jeanist		
2021	Dragon Goes House-Hunting	Daniel		
2021	Re-Main	Akimitsu Bizen		
2021	Sakugan	Rufus		
2021	Platinum End	Balta		
2021	Kaginado	Kyosuke Natsume		
2021	Detective Conan: Police Academy Arc	Hiromitsu Morofushi		
2022	Requiem of the Rose King	Henry VI, Sir James Tyrell		
2022	Love After World Domination	Matchlock Eagle		
2022	The Prince of Tennis II: U-17 World Cup	Leopold Camus de Charpentier		
2022	My Hero Academia 6	Best Jeanist		
2022	The Human Crazy University	Chihaya Godai		
2023	The Eminence in Shadow	Mundane Mann		
2023	Too Cute Crisis	Mitsuhiko Azuma		
2023	I'm Giving the Disgraced Noble Lady I Rescued a Crash Course in Naughtiness	Harvey Crawford		
2024	Sasaki and Peeps	Josef		
2024	Brave Bang Bravern!	Vanitas		
2024	The Magical Girl and the Evil Lieutenant Used to Be Archenemies	Bird Familiar		
2024	My Hero Academia 7	Best Jeanist		
2024	Delico's Nursery	Julas		
2024	The Stories of Girls Who Couldn't Be Magicians	Northern Harris		
2025	Ishura Season 2	Psianop the Inexhaustible Stagnation		
2025	Witch Watch	Daiki Sakai MK. II		
2025	The Banished Court Magician Aims to Become the Strongest	Eldas Mikayla		
2025	My Hero Academia: Final Season	Best Jeanist		
2025	One-Punch Man 3	Garou		
2025	Disney Twisted-Wonderland: The Animation	Lilia Vanrouge	ONA	
2026	The Villainess Is Adored by the Prince of the Neighbor Kingdom	Crail		
2026	Magic Knight Rayearth	Windom		

Other Anime
Year	Title	Role	Notes
2010	The Tyrant Falls in Love	Souichi Tatsumi	OVA

=== Films ===
List of voice performances in film
Year	Title	Role	Notes	Source
1991	Dragon Ball Z: Lord Slug	Soldier		
1992	Dragon Quest: Dai no Daibōken: Disciple of Avan	Derorin		
1992	Candy Candy the Movie	Archie bolt Cornwell (Archie)		
1992	Dragon Quest: Dai no Daibōken: The Reborn Six Commanders	Derorin, Korien Shogun Buregan		
1993	Sailor Moon R: The Movie	Fiore		
1994–1995	Slam Dunk films	Kaede Rukawa		
1995	Dragon Ball Z: Fusion Reborn	Paikuhan		
1995	Elementalors	Kagura		
1995	Legend of Crystania	Redon		
1998	The Doraemons: The Great Operation of Springing Insects	Tagame Robotrobo	short film	
2001	Slayers Premium	Zelgadis Greywords		
2002	Digimon Frontier: Island of Lost Digimon	Hippogriffomon		
2003	Atashin'chi	Iwaki-kun		
2004	Saint Seiya Heaven Chapter: Overture	Icarus		
2005	Air: The Movie	Yukito Kunisaki		
2007	JoJo's Bizarre Adventure: Phantom Blood	Dio Brando		
2010	Atashin'chi 3D	Iwaki-kun		
2013	Dragon Ball Z: Battle of Gods	Tenshinhan		
2013	Persona 3 The Movie: No. 1, Spring of Birth	Akihiko Sanada		
2013	Lupin the 3rd vs. Detective Conan: The Movie	Keith Dan Stinger		
2014	Persona 3 The Movie: No. 2, Midsummer Knight's Dream	Akihiko Sanada		
2015	Persona 3 The Movie: No. 3, Falling Down	Akihiko Sanada		
2015	Dragon Ball Z: Resurrection 'F'	Tenshinhan		
2015	Tamayura ~Sotsugyō Shashin~ Dai-3-bu -Akogare-	Nozomu Natsume		
2016	Persona 3 The Movie: No. 4, Winter of Rebirth	Akihiko Sanada		
2016	Zutto Mae Kara Suki Deshita	Saku Akechi		
2017	Kuroko's Basketball The Movie: Last Game	Nash Gold Jr.		
2022	One Piece Film: Red	Hongo		
2023	Gridman Universe	Gridman		
2025	Cute High Earth Defense Club Eternal Love!	Ata Ibusuki		

=== Drama CDs ===
List of voice performances in drama CDs and audio recordings
Title	Role	Notes	Source
Backlash	Kokawa Nakazawa		
Kamaitachi no Yoru	Tooru Yajima		
Brother	Yui Momoki		
Clannad	Yuusuke Yoshino		
Clover	Tsuge Akatsuki		
Dragon Quest VI: Realms of Reverie	Terry	AL and MZ	
CD Theater Dragon Quest	Allele		
CD theater Dragon Quest III	Hero		
E Zone	Rinichi Mido		
High School Debut	Yo Komiyama		
Hyper Speed GranDoll	Freedsharif	radio	
First Love Monster	Daikoku Nikaidō		
Maps	Gen		
MeruPuri Mini Drama	Adult Aram		
Mobile Suit Gundam Wing	Heero Yuy		
Mo Dao Zu Shi	Jiang Cheng/Kou Chou		
Ouran High School Host Club	Tamaki Suoh		
One-Punch Man	Garou		
Pick of the Litter	Futaba Hiyokoya		
Psychic Force	Might		
Saber Marionette J	Faust		
Saber Marionette R	Face		
Sailor Moon	Seijuro Ginga	cassette	
Skies of Arcadia	Ramirez		
Slayers	Zelgadis Greywords		
The King of Fighters '94	Benimaru Nikaido		
Train Man	Attrition residents		
Voltage Fighter Gowcaizer	Kasshu Gyuustern		
Innocent Size	Junya Goki		
Makeup Spirit	Hasu Nishigasaki		
Sotsugyou M series	Tougo Arai		
義経－桜花の残影－	Yoshitsune		
テイルズ リング アーカイヴ EPIC ONE～英雄の帰還～	Leon Magnus		

=== Video games ===
List of voice performances in video games
Year	Title	Role	Notes	Source
1994–1998	Slayers series	Zelgadis Greywords		
1994–2011	Dragon Ball video games	Android 16, Tenshinhan (2009–)		
1994	Lunar: Eternal Blue	Hiro	Also Lunar 2: Eternal Blue in 1999	
1995	Gulliver Boy	Maruchisu	PC Engine	
1995	Kekkon ~Marriage~	Togo Arai	SS	
1996	Tobal No. 1	Chuji Wu	PS1/PS2	
1996–1999	Battle Arena Toshinden series	Ripper, David, Subaru	URA, 3, Puzzle Arena, Card quest, Subaru	
1997	Tobal 2	Chuji Wu	PS1/PS2	
1997	Dokyusei 2	Aritomo Saionji	Sega Saturn	
1997	Tales of Destiny	Leon Magnus	PS1/PS2; Also Fandom Vol. 1	
1998	Xenogears	Fei Fong Wong	PS1/PS2	
1998	Burning Rangers	Shou Amabane	Sega Saturn	
1998	Psychic Force 2012	Might		
1998	Revolutionary Girl Utena: Itsuka Kakumeisareru Monogatari	Sōji Mikage	SS	
1998–1999	Langrisser V: The End of Legend	Sigma	Also IV & V Final edition	
1999	Evil Zone	Keiya Tenpouin		
1999	Rakugaki Showtime	Yukiwo		
1999	The Kindaichi Case Files: Azure Dragon Legend Murder Case	Koichi Sanada	PS1/PS2	
2000–present	Dead or Alive series	Ein/Hayate	Starting with 2	
2000	Super Robot Wars Alpha	Masaki Ando	PS1/PS2	
2000	Sorcerous Stabber Orphen	Keith Royal	PS1/PS2	
2001	Summon Night 2	Nesty	PS1/PS2	
2000–2004	Sukisho series	Sora Hashiba		
2000	Skies of Arcadia	Ramirez	DC	
2001	Super Smash Bros. Melee	Marth	Nintendo GameCube	
2002	Tokimeki Memorial Girl's Side	Kei Hazuki	PS1/PS2	
2002	Cherry Petals Fall Like Teardrops	Sagara Yamabico	Adult PC; Also Full version in 2008; As Teru Aokawa	
2002	Air series	Yukito Kunisaki	PlayStation, others Also remakes st	
2002	Tales of Destiny 2	Judas	PS1/PS2; As Leon Magnus	
2002	Ore no Shita de Agake	Ichiya Kurosaki	PC/PS2	
2002	Tokyo Mew Mew appeared new Miu Miu! Everyone Nyan to your service together	Koichiro Akasaka	PS1/PS2	
2002	Darling!! Backlash	Kokawa Nakazawa		
2002	Moeyo Ken	Kanokagamiichi	PS1/PS2	
2003	Guardian Angel	Hawk Shebrine	PS2	
2003	Bobobo-bo Bo-bobo play festival	Softon	PS1/PS2	
2003	Castlevania: Aria of Sorrow	Soma Cruz	GBA	
2003–2006	Demonbane series	Master Therion	Adult PC	
2003–2005	Angel's Feather series	Kai Misonou		
2003	Summon Night 3	The nested Basque (Lyle)	PS1/PS2	
2003	Saya no Uta	Fuminori Sakisaka	Adult PC	
2004	Samurai Warriors	Mitsuhide Akechi	PS1/PS2	
2004–2005	Zatch Bell! video games	Dufort		
2004	Reincarnation Gakuen Gensoroku	Nagi Hikawa	PS1/PS2	
2004	Flame of Recca: Final Burning	Mizukagami Koki也	PS1/PS2	
2004	Tsuki wa Higashi ni Hi wa Nishi ni: Operation Sanctuary	Naoki Kuzumi		
2004	Kessen III	Akechi Mitsuhide	PS1/PS2	
2005	Another Century's Episode	Heero Yuy	PS1/PS2	
2005	Animamundi: Dark Alchemist	Viscount Mikhail Ramphet	PC	
2005	New Century Brave Wars	KaminariCho Joe	PS1/PS2	
2005	Togainu no Chi	Shiki	Adult PC	
2005	Bobobo-bo Bo-bobo escape! ! Pubic Royale	Softon	Other	
2005	Shining Force Neo	Cain	PS1/PS2	
2005	Beet the Vandel Buster Darkness Century	Zeno	PS1/PS2	
2005	Namco x Capcom	Leon Magnus/Judas	PS1/PS2	
2005	Sudeki	Elco		
2005	NeoGeo Battle Coliseum	Yuki	Arcade	
2005	Castlevania: Dawn of Sorrow	Soma Cruz	DS	
2005	Critical Velocity	Saul	PS2	
2006	Otometeki Koi Kakumei Love Revo!!	Shinobu	Also Portable in 2010	
2006	Disgaea 2	Adell	PS2	
2006	Clannad	Yusuke Yoshino	PS1/PS2	
2006	Samurai Warriors 2	Mitsuhide Akechi	PS1/PS2	
2006	The Legend of Heroes: Trails in the Sky SC	Leonhardt	Also SC in 2007	
2006	Another Century's Episode 2	Heero Yuy	PS1/PS2	
2006	Xenosaga Episode III	U-do	PS1/PS2	
2006	Persona 3	Akihiko Sanada	PS2; Also FES, Portable	
2006	Arabians Lost: The Engagement on Desert	Michael Faust	PC	
2006	Quartett! The Stage of Love	Luca	PS1/PS2	
2006	The Legend of Heroes: Trails in the Sky	Lorence Belgar	Also Evolution	
2006	JoJo's Bizarre Adventure: Phantom Blood	Dio Brando	PS2	
2006	Tales of Destiny	Leon Magnus	PS1/PS2	
2006	Tales of the World: Radiant Mythology	Leon Magnus	PSP	
2007	Koihime Musō series	Zuo Ci		
2007	Reijou Tantei Office no Jikenbo	Kensuke Shiki	PS2	
2007	Warriors Orochi	Mitsuhide Akechi	PS1/PS2	
2007	Shining Wind	Killrain	PS1/PS2	
2007	Tōka Gettan	SakuraUkon	Adult PCAs Hikaru	
2007	Shinkyoku Sokai Polyphonica Memories White	Eliphas Blanca Albiona	PC	
2007	Little Busters!	Kyōsuke Natsume	PC also converted edition in 2013	
2007	Another Century's Episode 3: The Final	Heero Yuy	PS1/PS2	
2007	Chapter of Saint Beast - spiral -	Phoenix Luke	PS1/PS2	
2007	Ar Tonelico II: Melody of Metafalica	Prince Targana	PS1/PS2	
2008	Your Memories Off ~ Girl's Style ~	Shunichi Sasa	PS1/PS2	
2008	Super Smash Bros. Brawl	Marth	Wii; Archival audio	
2008	Phantasy Star Zero	Loewengraben	DS	
2008	Lux-Pain	Ray Platière	DS	
2008	Warriors Orochi 2	Mitsuhide Akechi	PS1/PS2	
2008	Little Busters! Ecstasy	Kyosuke Natsume	Adult PC	
2008	Crimson Gem Saga	Kilian	PSP	
2008	Fate/unlimited codes	Zero Lancer	Also Portable in 2009	
2008	Dissidia Final Fantasy	Firion	PSP	
2008	Sweet Pool	Okinaga Zenya		
2009	Tales of the World: Radiant Mythology 2	Leon Magnus	PSP	
2009–2016	Starry Sky series	Yoh Tomoe		
2009–2016	Little Anchor	Yukino Shiranami		
2009	Tales of VS	Leon Magnus	PSP	
2009	Ryoo ~ of Tōka Gettan ~ Koufukai	SakuraUkon	PS1/PS2	
2009	Full Metal Daemon: Muramasa	Sorimachi Ichizo	Adult PC	
2009	Samurai Warriors 3	Mitsuhide Akechi	Wii	
2010	Valkyria Chronicles II	Barudoren-Gassenaru	PSP	
2010	Keroro RPG: Kishi to Musha to Densetsu no Kaizoku	rain	DS	
2010	Ys vs. Sora no Kiseki: Alternative Saga	Leonhardt	PSP	
2010	Another Century's Episode: R	Masaki Andoh, Li Xingke	PS3	
2010	Shining Hearts	Raghunath	PSP	
2011	Another Century's Episode Portable	Heero Yuy	PSP	
2011	Valkyria Chronicles III	Barudoren-Gassenaru	PSP	
2011	Tales of the World: Radiant Mythology 3	Leon Magnus / Judas	PSP	
2011	Dissidia 012 Final Fantasy	Firion	PSP	
2011	Gundam Memories: Memories of Battle	Heero Yuy	PSP	
2011	Unchained Blades	Luscious		
2012	Maji de Watashi ni Koi Shinasai! S	Hikoichi Kyogoku	Adult PCAs Hikaru	
2012	Photo Kano	Kyudo Hiromichi	PSP	
2012	Shining Blade	Aruberihhi	PSP	
2012	Bravely Default	Kamiizumi	DS	
2012	Saint Seiya Ω Ultimate Cosmo	Pegasus Kōga	PSP	
2013	Super Robot Wars Operation Extend	Heero Yuy / Masaki Ando	PSP	
2013–2014	Super Robot Taisen Original Generations games	Masaki Ando		
2013–2019	Diabolik Lovers series	Ayato Sakamaki	PSP	
2014	Guilty Gear Xrd series	Bedman	PS3, other	
2014	Samurai Warriors 4	Mitsuhide Akechi		
2014	Persona Q: Shadow of the Labyrinth	Akihiko Sanada	DS	
2014–2016	Toukiden: The Age of Demons series	Soma	Also Toukiden 2	
2014	Persona 4 Arena Ultimax	Akihiko Sanada	PS3	
2014	Super Smash Bros. for Nintendo 3DS and Wii U	Marth	Nintendo 3DS/Wii U Archival audio	
2014	Tales of the World: Reve Unitia	Leon Magnus	DS	
2015	Photo Kano Kiss	Kyudo Hiromichi	PS Vita	
2015	Dragon Quest Heroes: The World Tree's Woe and the Blight Below	Clift		
2015	Granblue Fantasy	Albert	Android, iOS, Browser	
2015	Bravely Second: End Layer	Kamiizumi Nobutsuna	3DS	
2015	Fate/Grand Order	Diarmuid Ua Duibhne, Red Hare	Android	
2015	Asdivine Dios	Izayoi	Android	
2015	Asdivine Menace	Izayoi	Android	
2016	Summon Night 6: Lost Borders	Nesty	PS4/Vita	
2016	Touken Ranbu	Juzumaru Tsunetsugu	Browser, Android, iOS	
2016	Dragon Quest Heroes II	Clift	PS3, other	
2017	Danganronpa V3: Killing Harmony	Rantaro Amami	PS4/Vita	
2017	Super Bomberman R	Blue Bomberman	Nintendo Switch	
2017	Bungou to Alchemist	Ozaki Kouyou	PC	
2018	Super Smash Bros. Ultimate	Marth (Japan only)	Nintendo Switch	
2018	Dragalia Lost	Albert, Marth	Android, iOS	
2019	Sdorica	Morris Dietrich	Android, iOS	
2019	Crash Fever	Cao Cao	Android, iOS	
2020	Disney: Twisted-Wonderland	Lilia Vanrouge	Android, iOS	
2020	Arknights	THRM-EX, Gnosis	Android, iOS	
2021	Fitness Boxing 2: Rhythm and Exercise	Guy	Nintendo Switch	
2021	Sin Chronicle	Lehan	Android, iOS	
2021	Samurai Warriors 5	Mitsuhide Akechi	PS4, Nintendo Switch, Xbox One, PC	
2022	SD Gundam Battle Alliance	Heero Yuy	PS4, PS5, Xbox One, Xbox Series X/S, Nintendo Switch, PC	
2023	Fire Emblem Engage	Marth	Nintendo Switch	
2023	Persona 3 Reload	Akihiko Sanada	PC, PS4, PS5, Xbox One, Xbox Series X/S	
2024	Gakuen Idolmaster	Ryūsei Jūō	Android, iOS	
2026	Dissidia Duellum Final Fantasy	Firion	Android, iOS	

=== Tokusatsu ===
List of voice performances in tokusatsu
Year	Title	Role	Notes	Source
1993	Gridman the Hyper Agent	Gridman		
1999	Kyuukyuu Sentai GoGoFive	Dragon Dark King Salamandes	Eps. 26 - 39, 42 - 43, 49	
2000	Kyuukyuu Sentai GoGoFive vs Gingaman	Dragon Dark King Salamandes	OV	
2000	Mirai Sentai Timeranger	Stalker Detective Abel	Ep. 34	
2003	Bakuryū Sentai Abaranger	Bakuryū TopGaler	Eps. 19 - 48	
2003	Bakuryū Sentai Abaranger DELUXE: Abare Summer is Freezing Cold!	Bakuryū TopGaler	Movie	
2004	Bakuryū Sentai Abaranger vs. Hurricanger	Bakuryū TopGaler	OV	
2005	Tokusou Sentai Dekaranger vs. Abaranger	Bakuryū TopGaler	OV	
2005	Mahou Sentai Magiranger	Hades Beastman Belbireji the Incubus	Ep. 23 - 24	
2008	Kamen Rider Den-O & Kiva: Climax Deka	Negataros/Kamen Rider Nega Den-O	Movie	
2010	Ultraman Zero: The Revenge of Belial	Mirror Knight	Movie	
2011	Ultraman Retsuden	Mirror Knight	Also in Ultra Zero Fight	
2012	Unofficial Sentai Akibaranger	Kabukichō Mesugurohyōmonchō	Ep. 3	
2018	Ultraman Geed the Movie	Mirror Knight	Movie	
2019	Kaitou Sentai Lupinranger VS Keisatsu Sentai Patranger	Kazemi	Ep. 51	
2019	Kishiryu Sentai Ryusoulger	Wiserue	Eps. 7 - 14, 17 - 20, 22 -	

== Dubbing roles ==
=== Live-action ===
Year	Title	Role	Voice dub for	Notes	Source
2003	The Matrix Revolutions	The Kid	Clayton Watson		
2014	Young Detective Dee: Rise of the Sea Dragon	Dee Renjie	Mark Chao		
2016	Black & White: The Dawn of Justice	Wu Ying Xiong	Mark Chao		
2017	Chronicles of the Ghostly Tribe	Hu Bayi	Mark Chao		
2019	Detective Dee: The Four Heavenly Kings	Di Renjie	Mark Chao		
2020	The Untamed	Jiang Cheng	Wang Zhuocheng	Trailer only	
2021	Cowboy Bebop	Lin	Hoa Xuande		

=== Animation ===
Year	Title	Role	Notes	Source
1990–2007	Thomas the Tank Engine and Friends	Oliver the Western Engine (Seasons 3–7), Harvey the Crane Engine (Seasons 6–8), Bertie the Bus (Seasons 1–8)	Fuji TV version	
2000	Thomas and the Magic Railroad	Bertie the Bus		
2017	RWBY	Mercury Black		
