= List of Saint Beast characters =

This is a list of characters in Saint Beast, a CD-Drama and anime series about the six Holy Beasts.

== The Six Saint Beasts ==
Kirin no Judas (麒麟のユダ)
Voiced by: Akira Ishida
He is one of the two fallen angels that broke free from his imprisonment in hell and begins to cause the disappearance of the guardian angels on earth. He has red hair and 2 bands across his forehead. Zeus gave him the ability to heal with his lips, when he became a Saint Beast. He was the leader of the Six Saint Beast and was very close to Genbu no Shin. In terms of his age appearance on Earth, he is 24 years old and is 185 cm tall (6').
Houou no Luca (鳳凰のルカ)
Voiced by: Hikaru Midorikawa
He is one of the two fallen angels that broke free from his imprisonment in hell and begins to cause the disappearance of the guardian angels on earth. Zeus gave him the ability to read minds with his fingertips, when he became a Saint Beast. He is very close to Suzaku no Rey and he has the ability to fly (his wings is pure white in color with a shade of blue) and he was also referred to as the Golden Phoenix. It was revealed in the CD Drama that the tunic on his head hides a tattoo that seals his memory - of being the son of Zeus and Chronos' wife (Chronos was the God before Zeus), not of an angel and only two angels knows this: Judas and Rey. In terms of his age appearance on Earth, he is 23 years old and is 180 cm tall (5'9).
Seiryuu no Goh (青龍のゴウ)
Voiced by: Toshiyuki Morikawa
Zeus gave him the Sword of Seiryuu. Seiryuu means Azure Dragon of the East (Spring). Goh is the oldest of the Saint Beasts (the four Saint Beast calls him Anija which means older brother) and tends to be very serious and in charge of the missions given to him by the Goddess (they call her Megami-sama).He has a deep friendship with Gai. Goh's left eye is colored red whereas his right eye is colored blue, has short brunette hair and a pair of black gloves. Wears a blue sleeveless qipao outfit. He took charge and became the leader of the 4 Saint Beast (replacing Judas). In terms of his age appearance on Earth, he is 22 years old and is 185 cm tall (6').
Genbu no Shin (玄武のシン)
Voiced by: Takahiro Sakurai
Shin has an affinity for tortoises and plays the golden harp (or a harp-like instrument). He received the Shield of Genbu from Zeus (which is almost 3/4 his size and looks like the back of a turtle). Genbu is the Black Tortoise of the North (Winter). He is very close to Kirin no Judas and is very calm and quiet. He also has the ability to manipulate time but using such power has its cons. First, he needs a lot of energy and also his life is at risk. He used it once (when Gai and Maya called out to him on his mind for help against the wayward guardian angel)and he was unconscious for 1 whole week. His hair color changes from cyan to teal, long hair tied with a white ribbon (Judas gave it to him reasoning that playing the harp with a long hair must be hard), wears a black qipao (with long sleeves) outfit and white (changed to black at the second OVA) short boots. In terms of his age appearance on Earth, he is 21 years old and is 177 cm tall (5'8).
Suzaku no Rey (朱雀のレイ)
Voiced by: Kouki Miyata
Zeus gave him the Spear of Suzaku. Suzaku is the Crimson Phoenix of the South (Summer). Known for his purple hair and his sleeveless qipao is bright red, with brown boots (changed to black during the second OVA) and a tiara with red - gold as colors. He has an affinity for birds of any sort, including chickens. Rey gained the ability to fly after he became an adult angel, his wings red - gold in color. He is very close to Houou no Luca. He is also disgusted at humans because they eat fried chicken which happens to be Gai's favorite food. Very good at cooking. In terms of his age appearance on Earth, he is 20 years old and is 178 cm tall (5'8)
Byakko no Gai (白虎のガイ)
Voiced by: Hiroyuki Yoshino
Zeus gave him the Armor of Byakko. Byakko is the White Tiger of the West (Autumn). Long blonde haired with black highlights at the tips, wears a white qipao (with long sleeves), black pants and black colored flat shoes. Tends to be a little childish, inventive (but most of the time his inventions were useless) and full of energy. He has an affinity for felines. He likes to play pranks on Rey (but same as his inventions, it always fails) and is good friends with Maya. Gai has the ability to control and channel the laws of nature. When they descended on Earth, he has this favorite TV show called 'Venom Saint' that shows an animation of their recent encounters (or more like a chibi version of them that is drawn rather differently) and seems like Maya also has taken a liking to it. Also, he liked the concept of 'convenience store' and wishes that Heaven also has one. In terms of his age appearance on Earth, he is 19 years old and is 170 cm tall (5'5 - 5'6 if rounded off).

== High Ranking Angels ==
Fuuga no Maya (風牙のマヤ)
Voiced by: Kenichi Suzumura
Maya of Wind is the younger brother of Kira. Red haired, he is half human half angel, his mother being the human. He left Heaven with Kira and wanders around Earth in the hopes of finding their mother. He was very upset when Kira told him that they were leaving (especially since Maya wishes to be one of the Saint Beast so that everyone who bullied him - for being half human - will look at him with respect), and needed convincing by Judas who got hurt in the process. He is very close friends with Gai. Maya has the ability to control ghosts. In terms of his age appearance on Earth, he is 17 years old and is 168 cm tall (5'5).
Kagero no Shiva (陽炎のシヴァ)
Voiced by: Kousuke Toriumi
A spy for Judas and Luca. Shiva appears to be rather obsessed with Judas and hates the Saint Beasts, especially Shin. Prior to the ascent to the Holy Summit to choose the Six Saint Beast, Shiva entered the Forest of Darkness and got a demon to attack Shin who nearly succeeded (he managed to poisoned him by inflicting a wound on his left biceps), if weren't for the timely arrival of Judas. Shiva was the 5th candidate to reach the Holy Summit, but due to his encounter with the demon, Zeus (who sees everything with his transparent crystal ball) rejected him the position.
Ryusei no Kira (流星のキラ)
Voiced by: Tomokazu Sugita
Kira of Shooting Star is a blond haired and likes to bully Ray. He is very bad tempered and cold hearted to everyone but Maya, his younger brother. He left Heaven with Maya and became a Wandering Angel in order to search for his mother. He is especially rude towards Goh. In terms of his age appearance on Earth, he is 18 years old and is 179 cm tall (5'8 - 5'9 if rounded off).
Angel Saki (上位天使サキ)
Voiced by: Takuma Terashima
Childhood friend of Goh, he was furious that the half angels Kira and Maya where selected as candidates for the Six Saint Beast and protested greatly. Goh is saddened about this change within Saki since he was not like this before.
Angel Kariru
Voiced by: Youichi Nishijima
A friend of Saki who tried to calm him down after the result of the Six Saint Beast first elimination round and he is also one of the candidates for the Six Saint Beast but was not chosen by Zeus.

== Guardian Angels ==
Hakuja no Natsuki (白蛇のナツキ)
Voiced by: Miki Nagasawa
She is the guardian angel of the White Sands. She is considered very powerful even among the upper class of guardian angels and was offered a chance to become a candidate for a goddess. She instead left for the human world for training. While there she was manipulated and controlled by the two fallen angels and eventually gave her life and power in a withdrawal technique before Goh managed to help her to remember her true self.
Hayabusa no Hiro (ハヤブサのヒロ)
Voiced by: Kenyū Horiuchi
Hiro of the Hawk was once the most pure of the angels. He somehow lost his hawk spirit and therefore his ability to fly. He was still able to cope with that fact as long as his master was there beside him. But when he died, it is just to much for him. Depressed and desperate, he allowed Shiva to use him against the Four Saint Beast in order to revive his dead hawk spirit in the sealed Land of the Revival. He was then cursed and set out to harm the Four Saint Beast. His opponent was Rey who managed to defeat him by using the power of the Suzaku.
Bambi no Mio (バンビのミオ)
Voiced by: Rie Kugimiya
Guardian angel of Bambi, Gai and Maya were the ones who finds them on a convenience store. Her twin sister, Rio is the exact opposite of her in terms of appearance. She wears a pink school-like dress and her brown hair is tied at the left side. After the incident, they stayed at the Four Saint Beasts mansion but was again taken by Judas and Luca and were sent to Hell.
Bambi no Rio (バンビのリオ)
Guardian angel of Bambi, Gai and Maya were the ones who finds them on a convenience store. Her twin sister, Mio is the exact opposite of her in terms of appearance. She wears a blue school-like dress and her brown hair is tied at the right side. She was put on a mind control and attacked Maya and Gai when Mio refuses to join her. She later regains back to her true self when Shin used his power to control time and he did so by going back to the time where she is before the abduction outside the convenience store. After the incident, they stayed at the Four Saint Beasts mansion but was again taken by Judas and Luca and were sent to Hell.
Kame no Ayumi
One of the guardian angels who visited the Four Saint Beasts before the Full Moon Festival. She and her 2 sisters' master is a newbie veterinarian whose apartment is too small for them so upon seeing the mansion in which the Four Saint Beasts is living in, they were amazed. She has feelings for Shin but Shin's feelings for her is not clear. Shiva used her to get close to Shin so that he can kill him. Kira and Maya finds her at the park and found the awful truth about Judas. She wears a green beret and a matching green dress and skirt. She says feels close to Shin since they both wear glasses.
Tamami
One of the guardian angels who visited the Four Saint Beasts before the Full Moon Festival. She and her 2 sisters' master is a newbie veterinarian whose apartment is too small for them so upon seeing the mansion in which the Four Saint Beasts is living in, they were amazed. She is childish like Gai.
Tsubasa
One of the guardian angels who visited the Four Saint Beasts before the Full Moon Festival. She and her 2 sisters' master is a newbie veterinarian whose apartment is too small for them so upon seeing the mansion in which the Four Saint Beasts is living in, they were amazed. She always bugs Ray especially when he is cooking and she ends up making trouble for him.
Pinky (ピンキー)
Pinky is the messenger of sorts for the Goddess and tends to follow her everywhere. As suggested by her name, she has a pink hair and pink dress that seems to be the uniform for female angels.

== High Angels ==
High Angel Gabriel
Voiced by: Daisuke Hirakawa
First appearance would be in Judas' dream where they were young angels (all Six Saint Beasts members) and that the two of them (Lucifer and Gabriel) appeared. He also tempts Goh in helping them fight God but same thing with Judas, Goh refused.
High Angel Lucifer (堕天使ルシファー)
Voiced by: Sho Hayami
One of the High-ranking angels that the Six Saint Beasts look up to, especially Judas. First appearance would be in Judas' dream where they were young angels and that the two of them (Lucifer and Gabriel) appeared. For some reason he is against Zeus and is tempting Judas to do the same thing and join him but Judas refuses to do so.

== Gods ==
Supreme God Zeus (大神ゼウス)
Voiced by: Jun'ichi Kanemaru
The God Creator of all, has long gray hair that is tied on the back and a golden staff. He was reincarnated from the human Goro Mutsumi. Zeus initiated a new system within Heaven that ranks angels according to their ability: High-, Middle- and Low-ranking angels that caused disturbance among them. This new system made Judas uneasy because the previously kind-hearted angels now treat each other as if they are competing for a higher rank. Middle-ranked angels were envious of the higher-ranked angels and looked down on the low-ranking angels, whereas the low-ranking angels were envious of the middle-ranked angels and therefore will do anything to be promoted. Also has an attitude that once an angel committed a sin, should never be forgiven and therefore were sent to purged - which means the sinners will be turned into monsters and thrown to Forest of Darkness and each year, the number of angels who were purged increases. And when those monsters escaped the forest, he sealed them within a box called the Case of Hope. But later, when he found out that humans were increasing in number and atrocities as well, he ordered Pandora to release the contents of the box in the human world. In the past he stole the powers of the Saint Beast and sealed them away using his own life to prevent a war.
The Goddess
Voiced by: Kyoko Hikami
The Goddess is the boss of the Saint Beasts and is the one who sent them to Earth to discover what is happening with the missing guardian angels. She is previously known as Yuki of the Snake, one of the Guardian Angels. She is still close to Seiryuu no Goh, as he is her betrothed one.

== Others ==
Kamui of the Golden Wolf (金狼のカムイ, Kinrō no Camui)
Voiced by: Hirata Hiroaki
First met by Maya and Kira as they wander the Earth in search of their mother. Maya was sort of attached to him since he reminds him of Judas in sternness and kindness. Does not follow Zeus order of migrating to a different place since he consider their current residence the 'holy ground'.
Takeru (巫覡のタケル, Kannagi no Takeru)
Voiced by: Namikawa Daisuke
Saint (聖者)
Voiced by: Inoue Kazuhiko
Vice official God Pandora (神官パンドラ)
Voiced by: Fukuyama Jun
Short, blond haired, and is one of Zeus' most trusted official, he is unhappy about the Six Saint Beast living in the Zeus' villa since he is afraid that they might steal Zeus' attention and affection away from him, thus his position is in peril. Judas assured him that that is not the case and Pandora denies feeling so.
2nd Vice Official God Cassandra (神官カサンドラ)
Voiced by: Yuki Kaida
Like Pandora, an official to Zeus and shares his passion of hating the Six Saint Beasts.
