= Pick of the Litter =

Pick of the Litter may refer to:

- Pick of the Litter (film), a 2018 documentary about guide dogs for the blind
- Pick of the Litter (manga), a series published from 2004 to 2007
- Pick of the Litter (The Spinners album), 1975
- Pick of the Litter (Wolfstone album), 1997
- The Definition of X: The Pick of the Litter, 2007 album by DMX
