= List of Beet the Vandel Buster characters =

The Beet the Vandel Buster manga series and its adaptations feature an extensive cast of characters created by Riku Sanjo and Koji Inada.

== The Beet Warriors ==
=== Beet ===
Byito (ビィト)

Beet is a young boy who has always desired to be the strongest Buster. He aspires to be like his heroes, the Zenon Warriors, who are known as the strongest of all Busters. However, unknown to Beet, the leader of the Zenon Warriors is his brother. When Beet was a baby, Zenon wanted Beet to stay away from the path he chose, wanting him to live a life of peace which he tried to give him. One day, Beet told his heroes he had become a Buster, they quickly told him to quit, telling him he was not fit for such a thing. Beet, however, believed that Busters are fighters for justice and continued the hard Buster life. However, due to a fight with Beltorze, the "King of Tragedy", one of the strongest Vandels, the Zenon Warriors were critically hit. To make things worse, Beet showed up to the fight, trying to cheer his heroes. Beltorze saw Beet and rapidly took him as a hostage and mortally wounded him. Seeing this horror, the Zenon Warriors became distracted and were hit by Beltorze's most powerful attack, the Phantom Explosion. Thus, after receiving such an attack, they were left at a critical state. Worst of all, Beet was about to die. To save his life, they decided to give up their lives and give Beet part of their souls which were sealed in their Saiga, the power symbol of a Buster. Beet reluctantly tries to stop this; however, he is finally told that Zenon is his brother, and in a dramatic moment, Beet sees his heroes leave to try to defeat Beltorze- even without any Divine Power or Saiga. Seeing them leave, Beet promises that he will become the strongest Buster and end the suffering Vandels cause to the world.

Thus Beet grows over three years and begins learning to handle his gift, and founds the Beet Warriors to end the Dark Century. Beet is not particularly intelligent (something to which he openly admits) but he has a good heart. He is not able to use Divine Power as most of his fellow Busters can, which sometimes makes Beet ashamed, though his amazing use of Saiga show that Beet is truly at another level. Beet also has the ability to stay awake for three days, after which he falls into an almost comatose sleep for one day. He is a reckless prodigy on the battlefield, defeating strong monsters and Vandels (just barely) relying on his Saiga, his will to complete his goal, his luck, and his friends. Many, however, believe that such luck might also show that Beet has true strength within him- something that he has not truly developed. Beet is angry that other Busters are mostly corrupt, since he believes that they must protect others at all times. He likes to help people and never asks for money in return, except the Buster reward money which is given when you defeat a Vandel or level up. Since he does not use money, he usually camps in the wilderness and eats bugs which are free- much to his teammates' dismay. Voiced by: Reiko Kiuchi (Japanese), Colleen Clinkenbeard (Main) & Tiffany Grant (Younger) (English)

Currently, Beet has a one-star bounty on his head, although this knowledge has only been released to the seven-star Vandels. These Vandels drew cards to determine the order of who gets to attempt to kill Beet. This bounty was placed on his head after he managed to kill Grineed.

Riku Sanjo and Koji Inada said that they gave Beet a name related to the chest since Beet releases a saiga and that they wanted to convey "the meaning of excitement for adventure" as in "beat from the heart." The two decided to spell his name "Beet" as they felt two es would make the name "visually energetic."

=== Poala ===
Poara (ポアラ)

Poala is Beet's childhood friend. Sanjo and Inada said that she represents the "average person living in the Century of Darkness" and the character "closest" to "the readers."

Beet's so-called future wife that joins Beet in his adventure. Her family adopted Beet after Zenon left Beet to fight against Vandels. Poala has looked over Beet since they were very young, being critically harsh on his mistakes and wanting him to think reasonably which, of course, he does not do most of the time. When Beet leaves for his training in the outside world, Poala decides to become a Buster herself to protect her town from the menaces which arise. She is a tough, tomboyish girl that is ready to get her hands dirty in a fight with Vandels. She also has a crush on Beet. She's a reasoning person and does not understand how Beet can be calm and collected in very tough times such as fighting against tough Vandels. Also, she's the brains of the Beet Warriors, keeping everything about the group in her special diary. She is also the money manager, though sometimes she spends the money to "help" the group by buying all sorts of weapons. She likes to use the Divine Power of fire, specifically fireballs. Poala does not like to eat bugs or rough it, and sometimes hates camping with Beet because of his weird schedule, yet this is a major part of survival while busting. Currently in volume 12, Poala is revealed to be recovering from a life and death situation after the Vandel Baron's baptizing attack. The shot missed her heart by mere centimeters.

Her favored weapons are a pair of short swords and an arm-mounted armored gun. Her strongest power is the Divine Attack of Fire and its powerful Burst End technique. Fired at point blank range, this attack can annihilate even the toughest targets. She discovered this move in the battle with Grineed, in which it completely annihilated the Vandel's arm. Although she has not yet materialized a saiga, it is likely that the saiga she materializes will be fire-based, reflecting her ultimate Burst End technique and the writer's probable goal to have all five elements represented in the saiga of the Beet Warriors. Voiced by: Ai Maeda (Japanese), Luci Christian (English)

Sanjo and Inada said that Poala's name stems from poitrine, the French word for chest. The two said "it would be nice" if they could write Beet the Vandel Buster via her point of view.

=== Kissu ===
Kiss (キッス)

Beet's best friend and partner, Beet met Kissu two years into his training, and was amazed with Kissu's abilities. Kissu is different from other Busters because he is a master of all five types of Divine Power, while most Busters only use one. He is also exceptionally intelligent and able to notice even the smallest details and find a solution to complicated problems in a matter of seconds. He is not confident with himself and is wary of living up to his dreams but he wants to be bolder like Beet. Therefore, one day Beet and Kissu decide to make goals they wish to achieve. Beet's goal is to end the Dark Century, while Kissu decides to be the world's greatest master of the Divine Attack. Though it was time for both to take different paths, Beet went on with his training, defeating all kinds of Vandels. Kissu, meanwhile, decided to join another Buster team which took him in. As they traveled, Kissu was always treated as a weakling by his peers, until one day, a powerful Vandel appeared and challenged them. Seeing that the Vandel was beyond their powers, the team told Kissu to distract the Vandel with his Divine Attack while the others prepared a devastating attack to eliminate it. Kissu accepted and attacked the Vandel with all he had, which was useless. When he turned back to give the signal of attack, his partners were escaping-Kissu was used as a sacrificial lamb. Shocked, Kissu stood there while the Vandel struck the team with his power, killing them. To his surprise, the Vandel spared him since he was brave enough to attack him. As his partners had attempted to escape, the Vandel granted them death instead. Devastated, Kissu started to ponder the nature of humans. He traveled without direction until he stopped at a Vandel ruin, admiring them and beginning think how noble Vandels truly were. That was when he met Grineed, who was amazed that a human was looking at Vandel ruins. Seeing this, he took advantage of Kissu and decided to take him as his henchman, placing on him a poisonous bracelet, the symbol of Grineed's influence over Kissu. Kissu stayed with Grineed and obeyed every order that was given him, until one day, the one person that had changed his life came back-Beet. Then, he became ambiguous as to which side to stick with: the Vandel's or Beet's? After Beet defeated Frausky, Grineed's henchman, they were attacked by Rozzgoat, another powerful Vandel under Grineed. During the battle, he stood between Rozzgoat and a weakened Beet. At this point he decided that he would never leave his friend and would fulfill his dreams alongside him.

After the team defeated Rozzgoat, Kissu rapidly joins the Beet Warriors, being the long range Divine Attacker. He complains and pities himself sometimes as they travel, since he was out of shape, not being able to use Divine Power for two years. Though, when he is confident in himself, Kissu and Beet are an unstoppable team. However, serving under a Vandel is considered a serious crime, and Kissu is wanted by the Buster Association. After the Beet Warriors destroy Grineed, the Broad Buster Milfa sees the faith Kissu's team has in him and decides to escort the Beet Warriors to Kissu's trial.

Kissu's fighting style consists of using all five forms of Divine Attack (Fire, Wind, Water, Thunder, Light) to nail his enemies at long-range. To make it work properly, he throws arrows of light that secretly carry another Divine Power within them, making it hard to predict for his opponents what kind of Divine Attack it ultimately is. In addition, he's skilled at manipulating the Divine Attack of wind around his body as a shield. He has a favored final attack, Tengeki of Ice Shockwave (Frozen Wave of Divine Blue in the English manga), which pierces foes with an arrow of ice, freezing them completely. This, coupled with his genius-level intellect makes him a formidable Buster and asset to Beet's team. Although he has not yet materialized a saiga, it is likely that the saiga he materializes will be water-based, reflecting his ultimate technique and the writer's probable goal to have all five elements represented in the saiga of the Beet Warriors. Voiced by: Aya Hisakawa (Japanese)

Kissu is currently suffering severely from the reappearance of the Vandel who spared his life: Baron. His subconscious fear of Baron caused him to do what he has vowed never to do again- leave Beet.

=== Milfa ===
Mirufa (ミルファ)

Milfa is a young Broad Buster. (Broad Busters are like police for Vandel Busters, hunting down buster who break laws.) She may seem to be a naive and weak girl, but she is incredibly strong since Broad Busters are considered to be the strongest Buster force. However, as Level Forty is the minimum to be a BB and Milfa is only in the low forties, she is still technically a rookie Broad Buster. She is very flirtatious with Beet. After she sees his Saiga she realizes that he has inherited the Saiga of the Zenon Warriors. She considers Beet's encounter a "meeting of fate" because she idolized Zenon from childhood, and believes Beet will grow up to be just like him. Beet is impressed by her fighting skills, but does not understand her flirting. Milfa also falls in love with Kissu after he saves her and displays his amazing Divine Attack uses. Milfa mostly fights with martial arts. She fights with the Divine Power of Lightning, focusing it on herself like a lightning rod with devastating results (lightning armor or aura of sorts). Milfa has a huge Saiga called the Lightbolt Grasper, usable as a huge clamp to grapple larger enemies. Milfa considers Poala to have great potential, and together, Lightning and Fire make a wonderful team with Milfa as the mentor. Has recently started hitting on Slade, dropping hints such as revealing her rather large breasts to him in the guise of showing her level. She does, however, express disdain toward Slade because he is "no fun", and in volume 12 does a great deal to support a broken Kissu.

=== Slade ===
Sureddo (スレッド)

Slade, by nature, is an assassin. He met Beet while he was on his three-year journey, around the 2nd or 3rd year. The two are rivals to each other, but not in an angry sort of way. In the present story, he meets Beet and Poala at a port town, which later becomes the battlefield where Beet and Belltoze later fight. After said fight, he impressively holds off Belltoze from killing a weakened Beet. After a long fight, Belltoze eventually defeats him, throwing him into a building and breaking an entire wall. Slade, like Beet, uses spears when fighting. He is especially skilled at using Divine Wind, normally creating small wind shuriken or using tornadoes to attack. His strongest attack is called "tengeki of tornado", where he creates an enormous tornado surrounding his enemy. He then uses his Saiga, "Silent Grave", to slash at his opponent. All the while, he is moving so fast in the whirlwind that he cannot be seen. His personality is best described as quiet, not talking or doing unnecessary actions. He is basically the opposite of Beet.

== Zenon Warriors ==
=== Zenon ===
(ゼノン)

Leader of the Zenon Warriors, a group of Vandel Busters. He is Beet's elder brother and is considered to be one of the strongest Busters of all time. At the beginning of the story Zenon is against Beet becoming a Vandel Buster since he left Beet in the care of Poala's parents to live a peaceful life in the Age of Darkness. But when Beet is mortally wounded by the Vandel Beltorze, "The King of Tragedy", Zenon and the other four Zenon Warriors give Beet their Saiga to save his life and fulfill his vow to end the Age of Darkness.

He is a swordsman whose Divine Power is Light and wields the Excellion Blade, a huge white sword with wings on the inside edge. His signature move is the "Zenon Winzard", an attack where Zenon leaps in the air and, once he is close enough to the Vandel, Zenon slashes vertically, making this an unstoppable move for any normal Vandel. Beltorze admitted that it took his full power to block and it still cut halfway through his arm. The Excellion Blade has the ability to control gravity which allows the user to move faster and jump higher.

The Excellion Blade is one of the Saiga Beet has not yet mastered. Even though he can materialize it and slash enemies, it is still not complete. This is evident in his fight with Beltorze's phantom in Volumes 2 and 3 of the manga when he tries to use the "Zenon Windzard" against him, but it ends up shattering after he strikes Beltorze, showing the long way he still has left to be able to completely use the Saiga.

Shagi makes a cryptic statement about Beet having "that power." This has yet to be explained. Zenon makes a similar statement himself in the first volume, when Poala's parents tell him of Beet's odd sleeping habits. Zenon's inner dialogue reveals that a Buster's strength is connected to their sleep, and ponders if Beet could have that much more power.

In volume 11, Shagi's hint about Beet having a mysterious power is revealed by Cruss retelling the result of the battle between the Zenon Warriors and Beltorze 3 years ago. Zenon has the unique ability to summon forth more Divine power of light in a fashion similar to Milfa's technique where she strikes and envelopes herself with the Divine power of Lightning for melee fighting. But Zenon's ability grants him the power at the cost of his existence. It was considered so powerful and dangerous that King Gransist sealed it away, but Zenon unlocks it during his fight with Beltorze by somehow moving a tattoo of a key on his arm into his chest- the same area from where saiga are produced. He comments that this may have been the power to unleash his saiga to the next step.

During the fight, Beltorze copied this very ability and seemed to release the rare Dark Power called Sorcery. In volume 11, Beltorze commented that someone opened a gap in space and time and scattered the zenon warriors around the world so Zenon may be set to appear in later volumes. Voiced by: Hikaru Midorikawa (Japanese)

=== Alside ===
Arusaido (アルサイド)

A member of the Zenon Warriors. He has a calm demeanor, and silent presence. He usually does not talk and mostly meditates to "unify" himself with his soul. He is the long distance fighter of the group. He uses a gun, his Divine Power is Wind, and he uses the Saiga Cyclone Gunner.

The Cyclone Gunner is the third Saiga Beet starts to master. At first, the Saiga is hard for Beet to use because he can only fire one shot in comparison with Alside, who could fire lots of bullets. At first Beet though it was the difference of Tenryoku they both had which limited Beet's number of shots. After his second fight with the Vandel Frausky he realizes he has to synchronize his breathing with the Cyclone Gunner (since it breathes air, this explains why Alside could shoot consecutive times without having to reload) in order to shoot an unlimited number of bullets- in fact, in Beet's words, the Gunner has no bullets to begin with. Using this knowledge, Cyclone Gunner becomes a mighty weapon in Beet's arsenal. The Cyclone Gunner has a secondary form where it fires a thin beam of power and can accurately hit enemies that are far away, almost like a sniper's weapon. This secret ability enables Beet to simultaneously kill the Vandels Ventura and Frausky when they were far off, flying into the sunset. In volume 11, Beltorze commented that someone opened a gap in space and time and scattered the zenon warriors around the world so he may appear in later volumes.

=== Laio ===
Raio (ライオ)

A member of the Zenon Warriors. He is the lead attacker, using a spear as his weapon. His Divine Power is Fire, and his Saiga is the Burning Lance. He teaches Beet Sohjutsu (the art of spears) and as a result, the spear is Beet's preferred weapon. In the anime Laio is known as "the Master of Spears" which goes to show how well known the Zenon Warriors are. At first it seems like Laio is annoyed by Beet, but in reality he really cares about him. He is even amazed on how Beet changed when he became a Buster, admiring his dream and his will to become as strong as the group.

The Burning Lance is one of the first Saiga Beet begins to master at the start of the series, since his main weapon is a spear. Beet can power up the Lance using his divine power called (though if Beet tries to use the Divine Attack of Fire without the Burning Lance, he ends up burning his own hand) and can make it stretch to unbelievable heights similar to Son Goku's nyoi-bou from the story "Journey to the West". The Burning Lance also has the ability to change into a twin-headed spear, though Beet has not yet used this particular power. He uses this mortal weapon many times, relying on its strength to defeat many Vandels.

In the manga the Winged Knight was able to use Laio's saiga but it is believed by some anime fans that Laio may be Winged Knight seeing as the Winged Knight he was able to use a form that Beet never saw before where Burning Lance had two heads. In volume 11, Beltorze commented that someone opened a gap in space and time and scattered the zenon warriors around the world so in later volumes Winged knight may prove to be Laio or if not he may appear as himself in later volumes.

=== Cruss ===
Kurasu (クルス) A member of the Zenon Warriors. He is the defender and the healer of the group. He uses a shield (which is attached to a chain and can be used as an offensive weapon), his Divine Power is Water, and his Saiga is the Crown Shield. Cruss can use his Saiga or his normal shield to heal his teammates of poison one of his special abilities.

The Crown Shield is the second saiga Beet begins to master. At first, Beet considered Crown Shield useless for attack and only served to be a defense object. After Beet's first fight with Beltorze, he remembers Cruss teaching him that he should use offense and defense with a shield. He also remembers that Cruss used his shield to heal Laio of a poison he was infected with when they fought a Vandel earlier that day. Beet uses the Crown Shield to save Poala from one of Grineed's poisonous arrows.

When Beltorze finds him he thinks that Beet would be trembling in fear. But instead Beet had an idea of defeating him, he told Beltorze that in their first fight he used too many Saiga, so instead he should just rely on one and fight aggressively with it, so Beet decides to fight with the Crown Shield, which he declares the best Saiga to use against Beltorze. To Beltorze's surprise, Beet turns the Saiga into a spiked ball and begins to hammer him. When Beltorze tries to use his most powerful Dark Attack, the "Phantom Explosion", Beet turns the Crown Shield back into its shield form, deflecting the attack and killing the phantom Beltorze. After the fight, Beet realizes had he not interfered in the fight three years ago between Beltorze and the Zenon Warriors, Cruss would not have broken formation and they would have won.

In Volume 8, Beet finds out that Cruss is still alive, but he has lost his memory and cannot use his arms any more. Cruss is living as a painter, now named Cain, in the service of the leader of the country of Bekatrute. In Volume 9, he was captured by Garonewt to be used as a hostage against Beet. It also seems that Cruss is slowly regaining his memories, as evident when he saw an image of a younger Poala when she saved him, and remembered his battle with Beltorze when Beet spoke his name. It should also be known that there is a painting of Beltorze hanging up in his studio. Cruss mentioned that he continuously sees this portrait in his dreams.

=== Bluezam ===
Buruuzamu (ブルーザム)

Bluezam was the tank of Zenon Warriors. Bluezam's Divine Attack was Thunder and his Saiga was the Boltic Axe. Being so strong, Bluezam could make Vandels fly with only one swing of his axe. The Boltic Axe was a massive weapon with a power which only Bluezam could use. When Bluezam was about to die, he was the first to give up his Saiga.

The Saiga which Beet used the least was his Boltic Axe. One reason for this was its incredible and difficult-to-handle power level. In Volume 6, Beet told Poala that if he ever had to use it, she should run away as quickly as possible because he did not know the effects. Another reason is that it took him some time to materialize it: exactly twelve seconds. Because of these reasons, the Boltic Axe was only used by Beet as a last resort. He was able to control it to some extent, as was evidenced by his fight with Grineed. In Volume 7, he used the Boltic Axe to cut off the villain Grineed's horn when he was in his true form, because the axe was the only weapon with enough power to hurt him. However, his inexperience with the Saiga almost made him destroy the battlefield completely. Later, however, in volume 8, Beet remarks that he can aim and use the axe very well, as evidenced in his battle against Balleus, the newfound skill probably a result of the battle against Grineed. In volume 11, Beltorze commented that someone opened a gap in space and time and scattered the zenon warriors around the world so Bluezam may still be alive and be set to appear in later volumes. Voiced by: Bob Carter (English)

== Others ==
=== The Winged Knight ===
Tsubasa no Kishi (翼の騎士)

It is unknown who this Buster really is. He seems to know a lot about Beet, Saiga and the Zenon Warriors. He also is able to use Laio's Saiga better than Beet can. It is possible that he may be one of the Zenon Warriors, but Beet falls asleep before learning whether this is the case or not. Speculations about his battle with Beet can conclude that he may be Zenon. In the anime the winged knight sounds a lot like Zenon. He may also be Alside considering his skill with a gun and his body size. Further evidence that he is one of the Zenon warriors (most possibly Zenon) when, in volume 12, he was asked if he had a saiga and replied "not right now", a possible reference to the Zenon Warriors' missing saiga- though it is not known whether this is not the case for any other Busters. Right now he seems to be destroyed by Sir Baron when he dissipates into divine power, hence hinting at his possible identity as Zenon.

=== Jiiku ===
(ジーク)

(Anime-only): Jiiku, leader of the Jiiku Warriors and yet another one of Beet's rivals. However, Jiiku, unlike Slade, has the same views as Beet on what Busters should truly be like, as he was saved by the Zenon Warriors when he was a kid. Believing he should be Zenon's successor, he tends to loathe Beet for having inherited the Zenon Warriors' Saiga. Naturally, he's always eager to show he's better than Beet. Besides his arrogance and pride, he also has a weakness for pretty much any girl he meets. Due to this he instantly fell in love with both Poala and Milfa when he first met them. His two teammates are Ryuku and Raku, twins who use spears while he favors swords. He fights with the Divine Power of Fire, but usually just uses his fire Saiga "Blaster Edge", which is a special sword that can both fire smaller blades attached to it and have its blade ignite. Although he uses Divine Fire, he almost always fights with his saiga. While at first he really did not like Beet at all, he eventually did develop some respect for him when he learned how much the Beet Warriors believed in him. He is an anime original character and does not show up in the manga.

=== Ryuku ===
Ryukku (リュック)

(Anime only): Ryuku is one of the members of the Jiiku warriors, who mainly uses a spear and the Divine Power of Water. He can fire compressed balls of water that explode against his opponents, but he mainly uses the Divine Power of Ice to freeze his opponents. He is also able to flow ice tengeki through the tip of his spear, which he freezes his opponents with. The twins normally serve as Jiiku's backups, and they really never are shown fighting by themselves or are highlighted in fights.

=== Raku ===
Nakku (ナック) (Anime only): The twin brother of Ryuku and the third member of the Jiiku warriors. He, like his brother, uses spears in combat, but fights with the Divine Power of Fire, like Jiiku. He uses his Divine Fire in average ways, like fireballs, conjuring it through his spear, etc. He and his brother are the Jiiku's backups, so they mainly come in when he needs help.

== Vandels ==
Vanderu (魔人 (ヴァンデル))

Riku Sanjo and Koji Inada said that they did not base the Vandels on any particular mythology. The two approached the creation as if they were making a "new myth." They developed each character from one purpose or idea "as an axis." The fears of vampires and devils inspired the "image source" of the Vandels.

=== Mugine ===
Dead Swamp Tactician Mugine (死人沼の策士 ムガイン, Shibito Numa no Sakushi Mugain)

A Vandel that terrorized the hometown of Beet and Poala while Beet trained, and was the first one Beet destroyed in the manga. He is composed entirely of mud, fitting as he resides in a rotting swamp. Mugine's pride lies in his intelligence, and he enjoys making complicated plans and calculations to rid himself of his enemies. This Vandel has an apparent preference of the water element, using mostly water monsters as his servants. However, he also employs drawmen and drawmasters in his plots. Mugine enjoys poisoning areas with his mud lizard-filled black bogs, and had infected many areas before he was defeated. To attack, he absorbs water and turns it into a long, sharp blade, though he has created blades without water. Being composed of liquid, he can detach parts of his body and use them to immobilize his opponents. After being sliced in half by Beet, he regenerated his lost abdomen by consuming his monsters and fusing them into his body. In this state, he could create multiple blades from the crack between the halves of his body and spin them in a buzzsaw fashion. He was destroyed by the efforts of Beet and Poala outside the Gate of their town, ironically with the water-based Crown Shield's light.

=== Ventura ===
The Black Spider Ventura (黒蜘蛛 ベンチュラ, Kurogumo Benchura)

Ventura deserves mention by virtue of his sheer pitifulness. It seems unlikely that he obtained any of his stars without Grineed's help. Poala maimed and pummeled him without even using divine attacks. He boasts and bluffs then grovels like the worm he is when things go wrong. He is vain, cowardly and spiteful. Grineed made him his servant so he must be good for something, bonus material says he functions as a spy. He is without a doubt the weakest Vandel seen so far. He was killed, along with Frausky, by Beet, using the Cyclone Gunner's "sniper" mode, while running away.

=== Frausky ===
The Flashy Scarlet Bullet Frausky (鮮烈の紅弾 フラウスキー, Senretsu no Koudan Furausukii)

Frausky is one of Grineed's lackeys, said to be his strongest. Unlike Rozzgoat who is a dark attack specialist or Grineed who crushes his opponents with his fist, Frausky relies of the unique properties of his body. His right hand and forearm turn into a pistol that fire biological bullets that are generated inside his body giving him effectively unlimited ammo. His right arm works as a cannon firing bombs and he can launch a bunch of needles from his hair. Most formidable of all is his ability to withstand and recover from damage. Frausky has what he calls a core; it's about the size of a golf ball, has a face on it, and two leaves sticking out of the top. Frausky can survive anything so long as his core is intact, although injuries may still reduce his fighting ability. The core is usually concealed and can be moved to any part of his body. If he finds himself in danger, he separates whatever part has the core then plants it in soil to grow a whole new body. This is usually done with his left arm so he will not lose his stars. The abandoned body explodes violently. The strangest thing about Frausky is his love for children and animals. He says that baby animals and humans have an aura of helplessness and that he cannot kill them. When Shagie questions him about killing Beet, who is a child, he says that humans are cute until they reach a certain size after that they are "out of bounds" and it is okay to kill them. He is killed with Ventura when Beet used Cyclone Gunner's "sniper mode".

=== Beltorze ===
The King of Tragedy Beltorze (惨劇の王者 ベルトーゼ, Sangeki no Ōja Berutōze)

Slade called Beltorze "that legendary monster." After his fight with Zenon and his squad, Beltorze is left weakened and unable to move. Therefore, he uses a phantom (puppet with his figure) to raid and kill innocent towns, people, and weaker Vandels. His phantom was beaten by Beet in an epic battle. This battle helped Beet grow in fame in the Vandel world and moreover become Beltorze's awaited enemy. Until that day, he had grown in power in the mountains as time passed. Shagi calls him the veteran who never moves. It seems as if he cannot move, but it is possible he just does not. He considers the Vandel scholar Noa his best friend as one who has the traits he lacks. Beltorze lives for challenges and loves to fight. He will be the fourth seven-star Vandel to try to kill Beet.

Sanjo and Inada said that Beltorze was not based on Japanese mythology or any particular mythology; they said that his design is based on a "samurai" or a "general."

=== Garonewt ===
The Immovable Giant Garonewt (不動巨人 ガロニュート, Fudō Gyojin Garonyūto)

A huge Vandel who, at first appearance, appears to be made of bricks, Garonewt uses his special ability gravi zone to render his opponents too heavy to move, then smashes them with his fists. His skill with Dark attacks seems limited to powering up his fist. He has thousands of stolen monsters stored in his body bricks. He can release them by breaking the bricks. He can also store other Vandels but only if all their stars are removed, but any wounds, no matter how dire, they have will heal. Creatures in the bricks generate no dark energy so they pass through the shield that extends above a city wall with no problem. He has two arm shields that, like his fists, are so hard that the Excellion Blade could barely scratch them with regular attacks. The left one turns into a launcher for his bricks. He is slated to challenge Beet first. (Although he rigged the contest to determine order to ensure that he would be the first.) In volume 10, in his battle against Beet and his group, Garonewt was able to get rid of every monster block inside of him, which increased his speed drastically. It is revealed in volume 11, that the 7 star Rodina has set it up. Using her skill with portals, she made sure that Garonewt went first. Although the first to die, Hystario has commented that Garonewt would've been invincible if it weren't for his short fuse and tendency to cheat.

=== Hystario ===
The Assassin's Dagger Hystario (凶刃 ヒスタリオ, Kyōjin Hisutario)

Other than the fact he plays the guitar, little is known about this seven star Vandel. He is to be the third 7 star to challenge Beet. As shown in volume 11, Hystario hides a blade in his guitar, which he draws against Baron. Whether this is the blade that earned him his title is still unknown as of this moment. In volume 11, the name of Hystario's technique is called Fang Style Transmigration. He seems to despise Baron and has a powerful rivalry with him. At the end of volume 11, he managed to pierce Baron's body with his sword by memorizing Baron's movements during an earlier confrontation. In volume 12 it is revealed that his "Fang Style Transmigration" is actually his sword, made of his bone, being transformed while in its sheath, then, as he draws his sword, the specially formed blade, in this case, flies off at pierces baron. His current status, as in volume 12, is incapacitated by Sir Baron. He was literally torn apart by the knight then hung on a tree by Noa, the Vandel Scholar.

=== Lady Rodina ===
The Imp Rodina (小悪魔 ロディーナ, Koakuma Rodiina)

Rodina is the first female Vandel to be seen in the story, and she might be the only one. She looks human and is rather cute. She claims that other Vandels often accuse her of acting human but she is a 7 star Vandel and that does not happen by being nice. Her specialty is creating portals to move herself or others quickly from one place to another. She saved Beet from Garonewt but only so he would not get an unfair jump on the other 7 stars. Her constant companion is Cynthia the margtin – a type of small nearly blind monster with retractable spines, sharp teeth and bottomless appetite for human flesh. She is to be the fifth and final 7 star to challenge Beet. In volume 11 she explains to Garonewt that she manipulated him and chose to go last. She crushes his head when he is about to completely crumble after taking him to her room and is watched by Shagie before leaving through the Door of Shimyaku. She also appears to have some thoughts about Kissu.

=== Shagie ===
Shagii (シャギー)

The Chief of the Dark House of Sorcery, Shagie is in charge of distributing stars and creating monsters. He appears in the form of a rabbit and most of the time seems happy, but has a bit of evil margining under his surface. None know whom he serves – elegance, Beltorze or even what he called the "creator". Shagie communicates with the creator (called the "Eyes of Darkness") in a secret room and seems to understand what the creator is saying. Often provides Vandels with information on Busters. Has the ability to create doors leading from one place to another. He answers to the Eyes of Darkness who created the Vandels. It is unknown just how powerful he really is. The filler anime suggest he has superior combat abilities as he is able to easily evade all of the vandel Vaus' attacks.

=== Noah ===
The Vandel Scholar Noah (魔人博士 ノア, Majin Hakase Noa)

Said to have mastered all fields of study, Noa is what Grineed could only pretend to be...an intellectual. He dislikes fighting and never sought to be a seven star Vandel. In his own words, "I simply brushed off the sparks that landed on me and this is what I received." He created the Beltorze Phantom that Beet destroyed. He has withdrawn from the contest to kill Beet as he has no interest in being the 8 star Vandel. All he cares for are his studies. He is friends with Beltorze, and drew for him in the contest to determine order. It is also implied that he is in fact incredibly powerful, as evident when Beltorze said only fools cannot see the terrifying power in Noa. Noa wears what seem to be one half of a pair of spyglasses over his left eye. Whether it is there for reason or not is unknown, but it may be that this glass gives Noa some sort of power to predict what happens in a certain amount of time based on the current situation. Or it may be that this glass just does all the calculations for him. He may have a teleportation-like ability as he is able to appear instantly at Baron's stronghold to intervene on a potential fight between Hystario and Baron by stopping Hystario's secret technique. Another theory is that Noa has the ability to stop time, which would also explain his sudden appearance both when Baron and Hystario confronted each other and when the Beet Warriors fought Grineed.

=== Grineed ===
The Dark Green Tactician Grineed (深緑の智将 グリニデ, Shinryoku no Chishō Gurinide)

The self-proclaimed Dark Green Tactician, Grineed is considered to be one of the top Vandels matching in strength even the mighty king Beltorze. He detests the violent nature of Vandels, especially his own, and tries to contain himself by encasing himself in a special shell. He uses poisons and henchmen to do his dirty work, typically, rather than fight himself. He took Kissu in because of his knowledge. He set him to the task of deciphering ruins which held the secrets of making monsters from the Earth's materials. Before his death, the monsters he created were 99% completed.

When angered, though (this can occur at provocations as small as a bad choice of words), Grineed shows the true nature of the creature beneath the shell. Provoked enough, the creature will burst free of his shell. In this form, known by the other Vandels as Bloody Beast Grineed, he is virtually indestructible and nightmarishly strong. Using his Peak Infuriation attack a.k.a. Fierce Wave of Infuriated Steel in the manga, he can create a powerful blast with deadly results. Unlike other Vandels who view humans as a source of amusement, Grineed seems to genuinely hate them. He is defeated by the Boltic Axe, teamwork of the 3 Beet Warriors, and Beet's surprising ability to use Divine Attacks. He was the main villain for almost the entire first season of the anime. According to the filler, Grineed is much stronger in his normally seen form probably because he is much calmer to use techniques that were usually berserk. Voiced by: Robert Brillantes (Filipino) Ryūzaburō Ōtomo (Japanese)

=== Baron ===
Little is known about this seven star Vandel other than the fact he can fly. He has a unique sense of honor and was the one who spared Kissu while killing his previous Buster group. He will be the second seven star to try to kill Beet. He and Hystario have a powerful rivalry. He seems to prefer fighting humans more than his fellow Vandels and has a habit of letting promising Busters go in hopes that they return more powerful in order to fight him. According to Noa, this is why Hystario hates him. In Volume 11, he appears outside a village where Beet, Poala, and Kissu are staying and reveals his "baptizing blow" Fierce Celestial Palm, This is also the technique that slaughtered Kissu's former Buster team. He also is known as Sir Baron, due to being called "sir" by a defeated warrior who thought that Baron fought in a fair and honorable manner. In volume 12, it is revealed that under his mask lies his other brain, the violent and sadistic Zanga. Zanga awakens once a month, on the night of the red moon, and also asserts control if Baron is badly injured. He is currently fighting Kissu, who has regained his fighting spirit.

=== Anime-only characters ===
==== Gilam ====
The Red Hot Raging Flame Gils (赤熱の烈火 ギルス, Sekinetsu no Rekka Girusu)
The Raging Flame
Status: Deceased
Stars: 3

Using his monsters and his dark attacks, he terrorizes the humans of a small town. Right when he is about to kill a mother and her son using his Raging Inferno, Beet shows up and defends them. Then, Beet proceeds to defeat of Giluth's monster guards with the Excellion Blade to then fight against Giluth and his scythe. Beet is able to knock the scythe out of Giluth's hands and kill him with the Zenon Winzard.

Giluth specialized in fire-type Dark Attacks, including the Raging Inferno and the Expanding Fire. Giluth was also armed with a scythe.

==== Melmond ====
Gin'iro no Mashu Merumondo (銀色の魔手 メルモンド)

Known as Melmond of the Silver Demon Hand, Melmond draws out Busters and makes them bring out their Saigas. Once their Saiga is out, he traps them in the Circle of Hell and freezes them. He then takes their Saiga and adds it to his collection. Beet first encounters him after meeting Jiiku.

==== Zande ====
Hell's Lightning Zande (地獄の稲妻 ザンデ, Jigoku no Inazama Zande)

Zande first appeared with the intention of destroying the town of Uncruz, only for the reason of spiting the Vandel Beltorze who also wanted it destroyed. Beet, only a Level 1 Buster at the time, attempted to fight Zande, was an easy target for one of Zande's sword-throwing attacks. Beet was saved by Zenon, who then fought against Zande. Zande was able to cut through Zenon's sword but the rest of the Zenon Warriors came to Zenon's aid. Zande proved to be a formidable opponent for the Zenon Warriors, but their teamwork was able to badly damage him. Zande was ultimately killed by the Zenon and his Excellion Blade, using his attack Zenon Winzard.

Zande used Thunder-type Dark Attacks, along with the Right-Handed Thunder. Zande also used a sword made of electric energy which could be thrown as a spear as well.

==== Barasa ====
The Silhouette of Dawn Barasa (暁の影法師 バラサ, Akatsuki no Kagebōshi Barasa)

Barasa was a strong Vandel who had always wanted to control the Black Horizon. However, it was under the control of the stronger Vandel, Grineed. During Grineed's reign, Barasa put himself in a coma but awoke himself upon Grineed's death.

Immediately after awakening, Barasa captured the city of Termits by planting mushrooms which captured the humans living in the city. When the Beet Warriors entered the city, they found him killing a Vandel Buster, and immediately engaged him in a fight, but were overwhelmed by Barasa's extreme speed. Barasa then blackmailed the Beet Warriors by showing them that all the mushrooms surrounding them contained humans and that if the mushrooms were hit by their attacks, the humans in them would die. Barasa had also set up a cannon, whose powerful blasts were enough to send the Beet Warriors into the seas.
