= Sudeki =

2004 video game

- Cover art featuring (from left to right) protagonists Buki, Ailish, Elco and Tal
- Developer: Climax Studios
- Publisher: Microsoft Game Studios (Note: Windows port published by Zoo Digital Publishing. Digital Windows releases published by Climax Studios.)
- Director: Jason Avent
- Producer: Mark Simmons
- Designer: Tuomas Pirinen
- Programmer: Stewart Lynch
- Artist: James Brace
- Writer: Eamon Murtagh
- Composer: Tom Colvin
- Platforms: Xbox; Microsoft Windows
- Release: Xbox: NA: 20 July 2004; EU: 27 August 2004; JP: 14 July 2005; Microsoft Windows: EU: 25 March 2005; WW: 24 February 2014
- Genre: Action role-playing
- Mode: Single-player

Sudeki is a 2004 action role-playing game developed by Climax Studios. It was originally released for Xbox by Microsoft Game Studios. A Microsoft Windows port was released in Europe by Zoo Digital Publishing in 2005, and worldwide via Steam and GOG.com in 2014 by Climax. Set on the splintered world of Sudeki, divided into the twin planets Illumina and Akloria, the storyline follows four characters chosen by the god Tetsu to prevent the return of the dark god Haigou and reform Sudeki. Gameplay follows the four protagonists as they explore various environments, with different characters fighting enemies using third-person melee or first-person shooter combat.

The concept of the game began in 1999, originally as a Dreamcast project. After multiple platform changes, production proper started in 2000 as an Xbox exclusive. As Climax's first role-playing game, the team wanted to emulate Japanese RPGs, though the art style was adjusted from its earlier anime-inspired aesthetic to appeal to a Western audience. The game saw mixed reviews from journalists; praise went to its graphics and combat system, but there were mixed thoughts on the narrative due to its pacing and generic content. It also met with low sales in all release regions.

== Gameplay ==
Protagonists Tal and Ailish battle a group of enemies.

Sudeki is an action role-playing game where players take control of up to four characters, exploring a variety of locations including towns, rural areas and roads, wilderness, and underground temples and mines from a third-person camera perspective. The world is split between the main world Haskilia, the mirror world Akloria, and the Realm of Shadows. During exploration, the party can interact with non-playable characters (NPCs), break containers to find items, interact with local merchants and blacksmith characters, and discover treasure chests. Each character has a dedicated health bar and skill point bar which powers magic and special moves.

While in towns, the party can visit shops to purchase materials and items for healing and status buffs, sell materials and merchants, stay at inns to rest and recover character stats, and use the local blacksmith to upgrade weapons. During exploration, each protagonist has unique abilities; Tal can push and pull heavy objects, Ailish can reveal hidden objects including chests and pathways, Buki can climb some surfaces, and Elco can use his jetpack to cross otherwise-impassable gaps between areas. In addition to the main story-driven quest, talking to certain NPCs leads into side quests which can be completed for different rewards. Save points are found throughout the game.

The combat system is a combination of real-time fighting action, and menu-based item and ability selection which slows time. Combat takes place in specific arena areas within locations outside towns. The characters have different combat styles and perspectives. Tal and Buki fight in third-person using timed button combos to execute different melee attacks, being able to move or dodge around them during combat. Ailish and Elco switch gameplay style to first-person shooter, moving freely around the arena and using assigned weapons to fire projectiles at different rates. Characters not under the player's control have customisable behaviour patterns, such as attacking directly, keeping distance, or focusing on providing support. There are different status buffs (health regeneration, attack boost) and ailments (poisoning, slowed movement) which play a role in battle for both the party and enemy groups. Items are accessed from a shared inventory.

As they progress through the game, defeating enemies and completing quests, party members are rewarded with experience points. After raising a level, they acquire an ability point to invest in one of a character's four statistics (health, skill point pool, attack power, skill duration and effectiveness), or purchase new combat abilities. All characters have access to standard skill strikes, which can buff the party or be used against enemies. When skills are selected and used, time slows down. Cinematic spirit strikes, which are unlocked by progressing the story, can be activated once a special meter is filled by killing enemies, taking damage, or performing successful combos. Similar to skill strikes, they can either deal damage to enemies or buff the party.

== Synopsis ==
=== Setting and characters ===
Sudeki is set across three locations; the light world Haskilia, the dark world Akloria, and an intermediary plain dubbed the Realm of Shadows. In the game's backstory, the deity Tetsu governed the world of Sudeki, and in his loneliness created a twin from his own being. This split also divided Sudeki into two worlds, and Tetsu's twin took the name Haigou and overthrew his brother. Tetsu chose four heroes—Kariston, Olivitess, Mo, and Lebius—who banished Haigou from reality. One thousand years later in the game's present, the Aklorians are attacking Haskilia, which is united under the Bright Empire ruled by Queen Lusica; Lusica's past was marred by the debilitating illness of her mother. Among the game's locations are the capital Illumina, the Anthropomorph settlement Shadani Mo, and the technology-based city of Transentia.

The lead protagonist is Kariston's descendant Tal, a soldier on the Illumina Castle guard who is estranged from his father General Arlo and focused on revenge against the attacking Aklorians following the death of his other family during early attacks. The female lead is Ailish, descendant of Olivitess, daughter of Lusica, and one of the most skilled magicians in Haskilia. Buki is from the Anthropomorph people, a descendant of Mo and famed hunter for her tribe living around the Temple of Mo. Elco is a Transentian scientist and descendant of Lebius, a friend to both Tal and Ailish; he lost his arm in an accident and was granted a clockwork replacement by Lusica, putting him in her debt.

=== Plot ===
Tal is sent out from Illumina to defeat a raiding party of Aklorians. As he fights an ogre, Tetsu contacts him, warning him of future dangers; Tetsu appears to each protagonist in turn over the course of the narrative. Tal is then sent to retrieve Ailish from a neighbouring village, and sent with Elco to recover a large crystal from Shadani Mo which can power his defensive shield. Ailish and Buki follow so they can prove themselves to Lusica, and the four help clear the Temple of Mo of its infestation of mutated spiders. Retrieving the temple's crystal, they are transported into the Realm of Shadows, watched by the Aklorian assassin Lord Talos. The party escape using an ancient portal and return the crystal to Illumina, then are sent to Elco's home of Transentia to recover a second crystal. They recover it, and Elco's mentor Professor Hayton detects another crystal present in Akloria. The party are sent through a nearby portal, while Lord Talos kills Hayton and retrieves the crystal.

In Akloria's version of Brightwater, the four first defeat a siren monster tormenting the town, then are taken by dark versions of themselves to meet Lady Caprine, Akloria's ruler. She reveals that something in Haskilia is draining Akloria's light and driving its inhabitants mad, though Elco refuses to believe her. While Tal helps quell an uprising in Caprine's troops, Elco is forced by Talos to steal the Alkorian crystal. It is revealed that Talos and Lusica are working together to summon Haigou using Elco's machine, which is a generator siphoning light from Alkoria; Talos will become Haigou's vessel, with the price being immortality for the death-fearing Lusica. Elco realises this and sabotages the device, escaping with his wife Tilly and rejoining the others. Caprine sends the four and their Aklorian counterparts to the Realm of Shadows, where Tetsu merges them together. Talos then appears, having become Haigou's champion and killed Lusica. Tal fights and defeats Talos, and the four combine their powers to destroy Haigou, allowing Sudeki to reunify.

== Development ==
The first concepts of Sudeki were proposed by a small team within Climax Solent, a branch of Climax Studios. At this time, it was titled Symphony of Light and was being planned for the Dreamcast. By April 2000, it had changed platform to the PlayStation 2. At some point after this, it changed platform again to become a high-end title for Microsoft Windows. After its first year of production, the title attracted the attention of Microsoft, which was preparing to enter the console market with the Xbox. Describing the company's choice, Microsoft manager Peter Connelly said that Japanese developers were failing to deliver RPGs for the Xbox, so Climax Studio's project gave them an entry in an under-represented genre. The current form of Sudeki began development in September 2000, at the time as a console exclusive overseen and published by Microsoft Game Studios. Under Microsoft, the title was changed due to potential confusion with a similarly-titled series. The final game was planned to be called "Suteki", which roughly translates from Japanese as both "beautiful" and "great". Due to confusion during communication between Climax Studios and Microsoft, the title became Sudeki. The production team consisted of between 50 and 70 people, over half the staff at Climax Solent. At the time, Sudeki was described by Climax managing director Joe Cavalla as the largest project ever handled by the company, and it was their first RPG project.

The game was directed by Jason Avent, produced by Mark Simmons, and the programming team was led by Stewart Lynch. Designer Tuomas Pirinen described the entire design process as very hard, as they wanted to create both functioning gameplay and extravagant graphics to show off the Xbox hardware's capacities. The most challenging element was setting the difficulty so casual and experienced RPG players could enjoy the game. The game design was strongly influenced by Secret of Mana and Star Ocean: The Second Story. Its combat drew additional inspiration from Devil May Cry, the Dynasty Warriors series and Onimusha 2: Samurai's Destiny. Real-time combat was chosen as the team felt turn-based combat was overused in the genre. There was also a noted rarity of real-time combat systems with any depth and care in RPGs. The first-person combat was a relatively late inclusion, with the team needing to alter enemy AI so it would approach differently and allow players to see and fight them with the altered perspective. An early problem was the special moves and quick menu, as if kept in real-time enemies would have an advantage of either attacking a vulnerable character or moving out of range. Drawing inspiration from the slow-motion action sequences in The Matrix, the team implemented a slowing of time, allowing players to maintain an advantage and strategise without the combat losing its real-time style. It was designed from the beginning as a single-player experience, as multiplayer would have significantly delayed its release.

The storyline and cutscene concepts were created once the gameplay ideas were solidified. Sound designer Eamon Murtagh also acted as scenario writer. He wanted the cast to respond like real people rather than comic book stereotypes, and with that aim in mind the actors recorded together in the same studio, with their performances playing off each other. The overall aim was for the story to appear clear-cut and standard for players, then ask questions about the morality of different factions. So as not to dilute the plot, the narrative was kept linear and fixed. The storyline changed several times during production, with there being so much background lore that the opening cinematic was a compromise to communicate it to the player as concisely as possible. The plot's "creative energy" was fuelled by multiple sessions of Dungeons & Dragons. Each character was created with a character flaw that needed to be overcome, such as Ailish's sheltered mannerisms and Elco's over-questioning nature.

The game's engine was designed from scratch for Sudeki based on the Xbox hardware. To ensure minimal load times, the developers directly streamed data through the Xbox's hard drive, cutting down on memory usage. The team wanted to push the Xbox to its known limits, but also used techniques such as rendering static geometry with pre-established push buffers to take workload off the console's CPU and GPU. The lighting system had dedicated lighting and shadow effects for different body and character types, and dedicated software protocols were created for animating faces and expressing emotions; player characters had fifteen facial shapes, while NPCs had eight. Finding and addressing bugs was a key job for both Climax and Microsoft, who play tested the game in tandem in Britain and America. Notable bugs that were found included graphical glitches with character models, and Ailish's tutorial sequence where her healing spell killed her.

=== Art and graphics ===
The art design of Sudeki changed during development from a Japanese-influenced approach to a hybrid style of Japanese and Western art. Several character designs changed during development, with protagonist Elco going through the most radical changes.

The game's art director was James Brace. The lead character artist was Kevin Martin. Another concept artist and character designer was Niki Broughton (also known as Niki Hunter), a UK-based artist noted for her Japanese-inspired illustrations. She stayed on the project throughout production, producing hundreds of hand-drawn and CGI artworks. The designs were influenced by the work of Yoshitaka Amano, along with Western artists including Simon Bisley. Other influences included manga artist Nobuteru Yūki and Korean artist Hyung-tae Kim. The art team included Western and Eastern artists; one had experience with the comic series 2000 AD, while another was a former artist at Square Enix.

During early production, the artistic design was aimed at fans of Japanese games, with "cutesy and quite clearly Japanese-inspired" designs for characters. A combination of focus testing and requests from Microsoft resulted in more Western artistic influence being incorporated, resulting in several changes. The environments went through the same process as the character art, with real-world elements incorporated into some locations; the Anthropomorph village of Shadani-Mo drew stylistic inspiration from the Nevada desert and Native American tipis, while Transentia was designed around its "Orwellian" machinery and steampunk-inspired aesthetic. The cultures and locations of Sudeki were created early in production after extensive study of real-world cultures. Rather than directly copying the aesthetic of Dungeons & Dragons as many other RPGs did, the team wanted a unique cultural identity. The opening cinematic was directly inspired by Asian shadow plays. The team also created plants and animals with fantastical twists rather than carrying anything directly from reality.

Tal's original design was more in line with traditions for anime protagonists, with long hair and an oversized sword, but was made more realistic while retaining some basic characteristics from the earlier designs. Ailish was designed around a cute anime princess archetype, a concept which survived despite her design changing to become more adult. Of all the characters, Elco went through the most changes; starting out as an Arabic-themed archer, he went through multiple redesigns until the idea of his injury solidified his design into its final technology-infused version. Buki's design, while it was also altered, went through the fewest changes as her concept remained consistent throughout development. For all characters, the redesigns brought them more in line with Western artistic traditions, creating a hybrid style. The final artwork drew influence from anime design, but rooted within the Western artists working on the game at Climax. Each character's weapon was based on real-life weapons such as katanas and pistols from the Wild West era with setting-specific twists. Once the character designs were finalised, the characters were modelled in Maya based on those designs.

Out of the game's three locations, the light world of Haskilia was designed first, using a varied and saturated colour palette. The dark world of Akloria was built using the Haskilia map, with its buildings marred or destroyed and the environment using washed out and darkened lighting and colours. The character actions were hand-animated, with special software created to manage different character poses and expressions, including a dedicated tool to lip-synch the characters' mouths to dialogue. The monster designs were created with each of the game's theme locations in mind. Each character skeleton had between 90 and 100 bones, allowing fluid animation and high flexibility. By July 2003, around 90% of character models were completed, with the environments being in a basic state where details could be added. The environments were again designed using Maya, with the designers finding it easy to add in objects and adjust the scenery, while also being able to port directly over to the Xbox for tests.

=== Music ===
The music was composed by Tom Colvin. As he wanted the music to stand out from other RPGs, Colvin drew inspiration from electronic dance music, using breakbeats and electronic sounds in combination with traditional acoustic instruments such as guitars, keyboards and strings. At the same time, he wanted to maintain a classical feeling, so players would not feel like they were in an "RPG dance club", balancing the music between classical and contemporary. The musical score, rather than having a single looping track playing in different areas, had up to ten different layers of music which faded in and out depending on location and situation. This also applied to combat, with local themes growing more intense and instruments being added when the player character was in danger. Colvin attributed the music's adaptability to its dance music influences. A soundtrack CD was released by Sumthing Else Music Works on 8 June 2004.

== Release ==
Sudeki was first announced in January 1999 under its original title Symphony of Light. It was re-announced in September 2002 at X02 with its final title, platform and publisher. Originally scheduled for release in the 2003 holiday season, it was postponed to the following year to allow the developers more time to polish the gameplay. It released in North America on 20 July 2004, and in Europe on 27 August 2004.

A Japanese release was announced at a press conference in June 2004 alongside other Xbox titles. It formed part of Microsoft's strategy for promoting the console in Japan, principally by tapping into the RPG market that at the time was dominated by the PlayStation 2. As part of its promotion, several notable voice actors were brought in to dub the characters, including Kenji Nojima (Tal), Mai Nakahara (Ailish), Hikaru Midorikawa (Elco) and Yū Asakawa (Buki). The Japanese cover art was designed by manga artist Yamato Yamamoto. It released in the region on 14 July 2005 under the title Sudeki: Sennen no Akatsuki no Monogatari. (Note: (Sudeki～千年の暁の物語～; lit. Story of the Millennial Dawn))

A port to Windows was developed by Climax Action, a studio division formed through a team merger following the release of Sudeki which incorporated the staff of Climax Solent. The port was announced in February 2005, and was published by Zoo Digital Publishing on 25 March 2005 as a European exclusive. The PC version was published in Asia during August 2005 in Hong Kong and Singapore by Typhoon Games. Climax re-released the PC version through Steam and GOG.com in 2014; the Steam version released on 24 February, while the GOG version released on 23 April. The GOG version was delisted on 28 May 2020, then relisted on 25 March 2025. While a sequel was assumed to exist following a job request from Climax including the title Sudeki 2, the title was revealed to be a typo: Microsoft, owners of the Sudeki intellectual property, had not either requested a sequel or hired Climax for any such project.

== Reception ==
Reception

Aggregate scores
Aggregator	Score
GameRankings	(Xbox) 73% (PC) 68%
Metacritic	(Xbox) 72/100

Review scores
Publication	Score
Computer and Video Games	73%
Edge	6/10
Eurogamer	5/10
Game Informer	7.75/10
GamePro	4.5/5
GameRevolution	C+
GameSpot	6.5/10
GameSpy	3/5
IGN	7.8/10
Official Xbox Magazine (US)	6.5/10
PC Zone	62%

In a September 2004 sales report from the NPD Group, Sudeki was the tenth best-selling Xbox title of August in North America with sales of over 16,500 units. In the UK during its first month of release, the game only reached #25 in general sales charts. In Japan, the game sold over 6,200 units over its lifetime, making it the 78th best-selling Xbox game of all time in the country.

Computer and Video Games described the title as a reasonable RPG experience for children and genre newcomers, but lacking anything to hold genre veterans. Edge Magazine generally enjoyed the combat and exploration, but felt that it had an identity crisis going on between its complex elements and intended audience of RPG newcomers. Tom Bramwell of Eurogamer summed up that "despite building most of the game upon fondly remembered Japanese RPGs, Sudeki doesn't really leave us with any that justify the time we invested in it." Matt Helgeson of Game Informer said that the main draw for him had been its character customisation systems, with other elements feeling unfinished or unpolished; a second opinion from Lisa Mason praised the genre balance and art direction but found multiple frustrating points.

Brian Gee of Game Revolution found the game too linear and called it worth a look but not worth buying or playing for a long time. By contrast, GamePro was very positive about the game, praising its narrative choices and gameplay design while noting its linear structure. GameSpot described Sudeki as "more style than substance", with the numerous faults he found outweighing the merits of its combat system. Christian Nutt, writing for GameSpy, felt that its combat system was a good foundation for potential sequels but it was otherwise an underwhelming experience. Hilary Goldstein of IGN found it an enjoyable experience despite its short length and weaker parts to its narrative. Francesca Reyes, writing for Official Xbox Magazine, felt that the game was ambitious but let down by underdeveloped or poorly-implemented elements of its narrative and game design. PC Zone shared many points of praise and criticism with console reviewers, also noting several moments of slowdown even on powerful PCs.

The story often saw a mixed reaction, with most calling it overly generic and poorly paced. The combat system and its customisation met with general acclaim from critics, though several cited a lack of greater depth and floaty aiming and controls. The puzzle design also saw a negative reaction for its simplistic or uninventive design. The graphics met with general praise for their smooth design and bright aesthetic. The main character designs were faulted by a few reviewers. Though GamePro and Goldstein praised the quality of the voice work, many other critics panned it for poor delivery. Frame rate issues were also noted across both versions.
