= 10 Tokyo Warriors =

Anime series

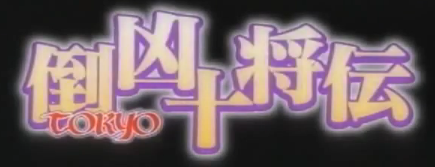
- Logo of the 10 Tokyo Warriors OVA series

倒凶十将伝 (Tōkyō Jusshōden)
- Original video animation
- Directed by: Hikaru Takanashi (1–3); Noboru Ishiguro (4–6)
- Produced by: Takao Asaga; Toru Taga
- Written by: Tetsuya Oishi
- Studio: Zexcs (1–3); Artland (4–6) (Note: Artland is credited for "animation production assistance", but the main company credited for "animation production" is Tahara Produce Office (TPO, ティー・ピー・オー) which has no animation production department.)
- Licensed by: NA: Media Blasters
- Released: July 25, 1999 – January 25, 2002
- Runtime: 25–30 minutes (each)
- Episodes: 6

10 Tokyo Warriors (倒凶十将伝, Tōkyō Jusshōden) is a six-episode supernatural action/adventure original video animation (OVA) anime series produced in 1999–2002 by Zexcs and directed by Hikaru Takanashi and Noboru Ishiguro. The series was licensed in English by Media Blasters and broadcast in the United States by Encore Action in 2007.

== Story ==
Long ago, in Japan's feudal era, an evil lord named the Demon King used his band of demons, the Kyouma, to wreak havoc upon the country. Only the combined bravery of ten warriors could stop him; he was sealed away and the Kyouma put down. But now, Lord Shindigan, one of the surviving Kyouma, plans to free the Demon King from his imprisonment. The reincarnations of the legendary warriors must band together to stop him and save the world.

== Characters ==
Kyoshiro Kagami: A private inspector in the present, he is the Warrior of the Mirror. Voiced by: Juurouta Kosugi

Hagiri Ranba: A teenage girl who is the Warrior of Fire. Voiced by: Kotono Mitsuishi

Jingo Kazamatsuri: A trendy teenage boy; he uses wind attacks. Voiced by: Ryotaro Okiayu

Futaba Amitaka: A quiet teenage girl who uses paper charms. She seems to have a crush on Jutto. Voiced by: Yui Horie

Farina Nanao: A computer geek who uses mono-fiber threads for her attacks. Voiced by: Akiko Kimura

Rokumon Hanawa: A reporter/photographer who uses plants to attack. Voiced by: Yoshita Otsuka

Minawa Narutaki: A blind priest who refuses to accept his destiny. Voiced by: Hiroshi Yanaka

Jutto Sego: The Warrior of Light and the main character. Voiced by: Hikaru Midorikawa

Kotana Kifu: A country bumpkin who summons a Sacred Beast through her pet mouse, Tsuina. She has a special relationship with Jutto, though neither seems to be willing to admit it. Voiced by: Yuka Imai

Hajime Shirogane: The Warrior of Martial Arts and the former commander of the ten warriors. Voiced by: Kenyuu Horiuchi
