= Animamundi: Dark Alchemist =

2004 video game

- Developer: Karin Entertainment
- Publisher: Hirameki International
- Platform: Windows
- Release: JP: 2004; EU: 2005; NA: May 31, 2006
- Genre: Visual novel
- Mode: Single player

Animamundi: Dark Alchemist (アニマ・ムンディ 終わりなき闇の舞踏 Anima Mundi: Owarinaki Yami no Butou) is a Japanese gothic horror visual novel developed by Karin Entertainment and distributed by Hirameki International in the United States.

== Story ==
Many years have passed since Count Georik Zaberisk, once famed as the brilliant Royal Physician serving the King of Hardland, relinquished his title and moved to the country to care for his frail sister, Lillith. The King offers Georik a new position as doctor in the capital, to which he agrees. During his absence, the villagers suspect his sister of witchcraft and as a result, an angry mob storms the Zaberisk manor and Lillith is burned and beheaded. Devastated by this turn of events, Georik is overcome with grief until he discovers Lillith's severed head still lives. Once settled in the city, Georik turns to alchemy, forbidden in the kingdom of Hardland, to restore his sister's body. Treading a dark, dangerous path, Georik's research may lead him to uncover horrific truths about the Kingdom, his colleagues, and himself.

== Characters ==
Count Georik Zaberisk (ゲオリク・ザベリスク伯爵, Georiku Zaberisuku hakushaku)
Voiced by: Ryotaro Okiayu
The protagonist. He makes a contract with the devil Mephistopheles in order to save his sister. A former royal physician and an aristocrat who must resort to the forbidden art of alchemy to restore his sister's body.

Lillith Zaberisk (リリス・ザベリスク, Ririsu Zaberisuku)
Voiced by: Yui Horie
Georik's sister. Before she was beheaded, she had an affinity for animals and collected Gothic Lolita dresses. After her beheading, she's somehow survived.

Count St. Germant (Germant Cassel) (サンジェルマン伯爵（ジェルマン・カッセル）, San Jeruman hakushaku (Jeruman Kasseru))
Voiced by: Akira Ishida
Hardland's greatest inventor and the Secretary of Science and Technology. As Lillith's fiancé, he is distraught upon hearing news of her death. He is a close friend of Georik.

Viscount Mikhail Ramphet (ミハエル・ランフト子爵, Mihaeru Ranfuto shishaku)
Voiced by: Hikaru Midorikawa
Another good friend of Georik; loyal and religious. He is the Captain of the Royal Guard.

Bruno Glening (ブルーノ・グレーニング, Burūno Gurēningu)
Voiced by: Takehito Koyasu
An alchemist with unsavory intentions who worships devils and yearns to contract with Mephistopheles, who has no interest in working with him. He became the royal physician after Georik quit the job.

Mephistopheles (メフィストフェレス, Mefisutoferesu)
Voiced by: Hiroki Yasumoto
The Devil who forms a contract with Georik.

Jan Van Ruthberg (ヤン・ファン・リュースベルグ, Yan Fan Ryūsuberugu)
Voiced by: Megumi Ogata
A mysterious fortuneteller and spirit medium. He runs the Golden Goose shop which deals in magical tools and ingredients. He is also skilled in the art of exorcism.

Francis Dashwood (フランシス・ダッシュウッド, Furanshisu Dasshu'uddo)
Voiced by: Junichi Suwabe
A broker who trades organs and stolen goods on the black market. He tends to pester Georik. He is also a member of The secret Hell-Fire Club.

== Reception ==
Animamundi did not attract much attention in the mainstream gaming press due to its limited distribution. The game was positively received among indie gaming websites focused primarily on visual novels, but many fans criticized the North American release for editing or omitting in-game graphics that featured gore or soft yaoi. In response, Hirameki released limited copies of the Japanese official game book. Another source of criticism was a text error that would be activated by clicking a particular series of events in a specific order.

In its review, GrrlGamer.com noted the "beautiful artwork, great musical score composed of symphony and chorus, [and] superb voice acting", as well as the elaborate story line and dialogue. The review also complimented the English language adaptation, noting that "aside from a couple of minor typos here and there... Hirameki has truly done an outstanding professional job in this title." GamerGirlsUnite.com gave the novel an 85% rating, praised the voice acting with particular notice given to Yui Horie's performance as Lillith, and concluded that "... if you want to explore a new gaming genre, you're fond of reading stories and not afraid of getting into a gothic horror adventure, this is the game you need to experience. You won't regret it!

This was the first game to contain a "Sexual Violence" rating description by the ESRB. The next video games to receive this were Ef: A Fairy Tale of the Two and Metal Gear Solid V: Ground Zeroes, both released in 2014.
