= Sukisho =

Japanese visual novel

好きなものは好きだからしょうがない (Suki na Mono wa Suki Dakara Shōganai!!)
- Genre: Drama, romantic comedy, slice of life, yaoi
- Video game

Mou Matte
- Developer: UNiSONSHIFT
- Publisher: ?
- Genre: Visual Novel
- Platform: Windows
- Released: September 10, 1999
- Video game

First Limit
- Developer: Platinum Label
- Genre: Visual Novel
- Platform: Windows, PlayStation 2
- Released: August 10, 2000 (Windows); March 25, 2004 (PS2)
- Light novel
- Written by: Riho Sawaki
- Illustrated by: Tsutae Yuzu
- Published by: Kadokawa Shoten
- Original run: November 2000 – April 2005
- Volumes: 14
- Video game

Target Nights
- Developer: Platinum Label
- Genre: Visual Novel
- Platform: Windows, PlayStation 2
- Released: May 25, 2001 (Windows); March 25, 2004 (PS2)
- Video game

Rain
- Developer: Platinum Label
- Genre: Visual Novel
- Platform: Windows, PlayStation 2
- Released: May 17, 2002 (Windows); October 21, 2004 (PS2)
- Video game

White Flower
- Developer: Platinum Label
- Genre: Visual Novel
- Platform: Windows
- Released: July 31, 2003
- Anime television series
- Directed by: Haruka Ninomiya
- Written by: Mamiko Ikeda
- Music by: Naoki Satō
- Studio: Zexcs
- Original network: TV Kanagawa, Chiba TV, TV Saitama, TV Aichi, Sun TV, Kids Station
- Original run: January 8, 2005 – March 26, 2005
- Episodes: 13

Sukisho, released in Japan as Suki na Mono wa Suki Dakara Shōganai!! (好きなものは好きだからしょうがない!!; lit. I Like What I Like, So It Can't Be Helped!), is a Japanese yaoi visual novel developed by UNiSONSHIFT and released on September 10, 1999. It has since been adapted into a light novel series and an anime television series animated by Zexcs and aired from January to March 2005. The story is owned by SOFTPAL and Platinum Label, and the illustrations to the novels and games is by Tsutae Yuzu.

== Plot ==
High-school student Sora Hashiba was hospitalized after falling from the fourth floor of his school building. On his first night back in the dormitory, he wakes to find a strange boy addressing him by the name of "Yoru". The stranger identifies himself as "Ran" and says he's Sora's new roommate. The next day, Sora's childhood friend and dorm manager, Matsuri Honjou, informs Sora that the other boy, whom Matsuri identifies as Sunao Fujimori or "Nao-kun", is actually another childhood friend of Sora. Sora doesn't remember meeting Sunao before. In fact, Sora can't remember much of anything regarding his past, and the series follows his quest to regain his memory.

Sora soon learns why Sunao identified himself as "Ran" that first night: he and Sora have alternate personalities. Sora's is Yoru, a powerful protector and the lover of the more dependent, feminized Ran. The existence of these alternate personalities and the relationship between them has some mysterious connection with Sora's fall from the window and his forgotten past. The alternate personalities' passionate relationship is a far cry from the hostility and distrust between Sora and Sunao. Because Yoru and Ran possess them arbitrarily, Sora and Sunao frequently find themselves in embarrassing situations when they regain control of their minds.

Other comical situations arise from Matsuri's efforts to draw Sora and Sunao into his moneymaking schemes, known as the group "The School Do-It-Alls" and from such minor characters as a bishōnen ghost and three younger boys who resemble the trio. No parents are ever mentioned, and the only authority figures are school nurse Kai Nanami and math teacher Shin'ichirou Minato, but it is known that Sora and Sunao are both orphans. Both have some connection with Sora and Sunao's dark past, which also involves one of the older students at the school, Kai Nagase, and a mysterious doctor named Aizawa.

== Episodes ==
Opening Theme: "Just a Survivor", performed by Tatsuhisa Suzuki.
Ending Theme: "Daydreamin'", performed by Kishō Taniyama.

1. Sukisho!
2. The Campus Jack of All Trades Appears
3. Mini Triangle
4. A Bandit Appears
5. Spirit Boy Hiromu
6. Formation of Angel-chans
7. Sunao's Suspicion
8. Midnight Embrace
9. Sora and Sunao
10. Hatred
11. Revenge
12. Rescue!
13. OVA - Let's Go to the Hot Springs!

== Games ==
Currently, there are four games and one spin-off in the Sukisho series. The games were originally point-and-click visual novels released for Windows, containing sexual content, though certain body parts are censored (as is all pornographic material in Japan).

Three of the games have been released on the Sony PlayStation 2. The PS2 versions have been heavily edited, and many new CG scenes have been added. In addition, they feature the voice acting from the Drama CD cast, which was absent in the Windows release. These games do not yet have an official English translation.

=== First Limit ===
The first game in the series. Sora Hashiba was put into the hospital for quite some time after falling from one of the school buildings. He didn't receive any major injuries, but he has lost some of his memories in the process. However, he continually sees a vision of himself being carried through several dark corridors and the voice of someone calling out to him. After being released from the hospital, Sora heads back to the dorms to find that a new boy by the name of Sunao Fujimori will now be his roommate. He is told that Sunao is his childhood friend, but he cannot recall spending his childhood with Sunao. As he spends time with Sunao, he notices some strange things about him, including his transformation into his alternate personality, Ran. On top of that, the spirit of a hospitalized schoolmate possesses Sunao and confesses his love for him. Depending on the player's decisions, Sora can either end up with Sunao, Hiromu, Ran, or Minato.

=== Target Nights ===
After spending some time in Shin-ichirou and Nanami's place, Sora and Sunao come across a mysterious cosplaying bandit known only by the number 416. He claims that he has come to take away something precious from Sora. Meanwhile, Sora and Sunao meet Chris, who works at the nearby church. While he seems harmless, he begins to spend more time with Sora. To top it all off, Sora begins to realize that there are times when he and Sunao are mysteriously in bed together. He already knows about Sunao's connection with his alternate personality, Ran, but could that mean he has his alternate personality as well? Depending on the choices of the player, Sora will either end up with Sunao, Chris, Ran, Matsuri, or Minato. Also, obtaining all the CGs rewards the player with a special ending involving bandits 416, 773, and, most recently, 848.

=== Rain ===
Possibly the turning point in the series. Sora and Sunao continue their life in school. All seems normal until Sora notices a child who looks very similar to him. Also, some of his schoolmates are beginning to act a little strange. Even Sora begins to notice something odd about his connection to Sunao and the relationship between their alternate personalities, Yoru and Ran. Depending on the choices of the player, Sora may end up with Sunao, Matsuri, Soushi, or Minato. Collecting all the CGs allows the player to access secret endings that involve Sora, Sunao, Matsuri, Shin-ichirou, and Nanami banding together as cosplaying bandits 848, 370, 332, 416, and 773.

Sukisho cast's status prior to White Flower:

- Sora: Working as a teacher in the nearby school (which is no longer an all-boys school).
- Sunao: Has been missing since Rain. Said to be working for Aizawa.
- Matsuri: Working in an animal shelter (needs to be confirmed).
- Shin-ichirou: Has been missing since Rain.
- Nanami: Still the school nurse
- Sei and Kitamura: Students in Sora's class
- Gaku: Still working with Nagase in the chemistry labs, but no longer as a student
- Nagase: Still chemistry lab manager
- Hiromu: Working as a model with Kirito Nakahara
- Chris: Still working at the nearby church
- Soushi: Still a lawyer.
- Professor Aizawa: Has been missing since Rain. Said to have taken Sunao and Shin-ichirou with him.

=== White Flower ===
The final game in the series. Taking place a couple of years after Rain, many changes have been made to the school. Not only is it no longer an all-boys school, but several of the former students are also now working as teachers, while others move on to other jobs. Sora, as one of the teachers, has been living a fairly normal life as he takes Minato's place as a teacher. However, he realizes that it won't stay normal for long when he sees that Sunao, whom he has not seen since the events in Rain, reappears in one of the halls. This game finally wraps up the story between Sora and Sunao and ends their conflict with Professor Aizawa. Depending on the player's choices, Sora can either end up with Sunao, Nanami, Hiromu, Matsuri, Soushi, or Minato. There are two hidden endings in this game. The Yoru/Ran ending is received when achieving the true ending, while the Kaito ending is obtained when all the CGs are collected.

=== Mou Matte ===
A spin-off of the Sukisho games. Takes place sometime in between Rain and White Flower. The player now controls Gaku Ichikawa, one of Sora's friends who worked in the Chemistry Lab. Gaku must now choose whether to continue his relationship with Kai Nagase or start a new one with Ren Shiina. Depending on the player's choice, Gaku may end up with Shiina, Nagase, or Kitamura. Most of the main cast from the previous Sukisho games are visibly absent, including Sora and Sunao. Of the original cast, only Gaku, Nagase, Shiina, Kitamura, Nanami, Nakahara, and Hano make appearances.
