= Pick of the Litter (manga) =

Japanese manga series

- Cover of the first volume of the English language release of Pick of the Litter

異界繁盛記 ひよこや☆商店 (Ikai Hanjōki - Hiyokoya Shōten)
- Genre: Comedy, Supernatural
- Manga
- Written by: Yuriko Suda
- Published by: Kadokawa Shoten
- English publisher: Tokyopop
- Magazine: Monthly Asuka
- Original run: 2004 – 2007
- Volumes: 6

Pick of the Litter (異界繁盛記 ひよこや☆商店, Ikai Hanjōki – Hiyokoya Shōten; lit. "Spirit World Prosperity Chronicle – Hiyokoya Shop") is a Japanese shōjo manga series written by Yuriko Suda that was serialized in Monthly Asuka from 2004 through 2007. The individual chapters were published in six tankōbon volumes by Kadokawa Shoten.

Tokyopop licensed the series for an English language release in North America by Tokyopop in 2007, at first releasing the title solely online before beginning to release it in tankōbon form. After releasing four of the six volumes, Tokyopop canceled its planned release of the fifth volume, but has recently released it in May 2010.

== Plot ==
Five years ago, ten-year-old Riku Fukagawa arrived in Tokyo with no memory of his past except for his name. Since then, he has been living a normal life and going to school, while wondering who he really is and if he has any family still looking for him. One day, some strangely dressed characters insist that he is their long-lost relative and drag him to another world called Yamato.

There he discovers that he is "special," and that his family isn't completely human. They have animal like ears, animal tails, and special abilities. He has five older brothers who run a shop named Hiyokoya that sells weird objects like "live soap bubbles" and "tangle octopus." Thus begins Riku's adventure as he tries to study for exams in Japan and work at the Hiyokoya in Yamato at the same time.

== Characters ==
Riku Fukagawa
Riku Fukagawa is 15-year-old boy who lives in Tokyo. He can't remember anything about his family and claims that the only thing he remembered when he was found 5 years ago was his name. Riku has an uncanny urge to help people and all other living things in need. He also states that he couldn't even remember proper Japanese. One day after school he goes to a flea market. There he sees an out-of-the-ordinary character named Satsuki selling "goldfish" though what he is selling is clearly not goldfish. When one of the creatures tries to eat Futaba, a small half rabbit boy, he takes the translating book that Satsuki had to help translate. Riku's friends and Riku himself were shocked to find that Riku could understand the strange language. After that, Satsuki claims that he is Riku's older brother and that he came to take him back to the shop. In chapter 2 of the first volume, Riku helps Satsuki with a delivery because he thinks the load will be too much for Satsuki alone. He tells Satsuki that he came along because he thought the trip would help trigger his memories. Satsuki said it wouldn't because Riku had barely ever left his bedroom so he didn't have many memories of the town anyway. It is later revealed that Riku is a tsunagi (the ability to listen and free a holy spirit from its stone)Riku is the youngest Hiyokoya brother.
Satsuki Hiyokoya
Satsuki is Riku's 15-year-old older half-brother. He is very dimwitted and laid-back, but take precautionary steps to protect Riku, even though the current Riku does not need any help. He is first introduced trying to sell weird creatures from the Hiyokoya shop, calling them goldfish. Satsuki is the only one in the shop that does not know how to speak proper Japanese and has to rely on a translating book. He and Shii usually both want to do things, and end up playing rock-paper-scissors to settle it. Shii usually wins. Satsuki is irresponsible, as shown in chapter 2 of the first volume, when he lets the bagworm that he and Riku were transporting get stolen.
Ichiya Hiyokoya
Ichiya is the young master of Hiyokoya. He is the oldest sibling and dotes on Riku. He gives Riku everything that Riku like even if he doesn't fully approve it. He is overprotective on Riku as he blames himself of not being able to protect Riku five years ago. He wants to keep Riku away on holyspirit stones as he is afraid to repeat the incident that happened. He and Riku have the same mother.
Futaba Hiyokoya
Futaba is the second brother. He is a member of the mysterious Usamimi Clan with the ability to connect Yamato and Japan. He is often gets attacked by crows. He has the appearance of a child with the rabbit ears but can transform to an adult by a limited time. He doesn't talk when he's in chibi form. He writes to communicate to others.
Mikasa Hiyokoya
Mikasa is the third brother of Riku. Mikasa is a loafer and Hiyokoya's biggest problem child. Though it may seem that he doesn't care about his family he's always there when his family is in danger. He's quite popular in the red-light district. He can change into a red crow.
Shii Hiyokoya
Shii is the fourth brother of Riku. Shii is an easygoing and aloof, but he's also quite the little schemer. Shii is usually the one who punish Satsuki when he damage their goods. Shii is also very good in crossdressing and always drag Riku into it much to Riku's chagrin.
Saika
Saika is the holy spirit with enormous power. He is normally sealed inside a stone that's shaped like a beckoning cat. He "syncs up" with Riku to display various powers, but his true power has yet to be discovered.
Konohana
Konohana is Riku's cousin. Konohana is a capable girl who's a member of the Usa-mimi Clan. She doesn't have any magic though.
Mio
Mio is the short-tempered head clerk of the shop. Mio is Riku's father's cousin. He supports Hiyokoya on the management side of things. Mio gets really angry when it comes to spending money.
