= YuYu Hakusho (1992 TV series) =

Japanese anime television series

- Promotional Fuji TV poster featuring Yusuke Urameshi, Botan, Kurama, Hiei, Kazuma Kuwabara and Koenma

Japanese name
- Kanji: 幽☆遊☆白書
Transcriptions
- Revised Hepburn: Yū Yū Hakusho
- Based on: YuYu Hakusho by Yoshihiro Togashi
- Developed by: Yukiyoki Ohashi
- Directed by: Noriyuki Abe
- Music by: Yusuke Honma
- Country of origin: Japan
- Original language: Japanese
- No. of episodes: 112 (list of episodes)

Production
- Executive producer: Yuji Nunokawa (Studio Pierrot)
- Producers: Kenji Shimizu (Fuji TV); Koji Kaneda (Fuji TV); Kyotaro Kimura (Yomiko Advertising); Ken Hagino (Studio Pierrot)
- Production companies: Fuji Television; Yomiko Advertising; Studio Pierrot Co., Ltd.

Original release
- Network: FNS (Fuji TV)
- Release: October 10, 1992 – January 7, 1995

Related
Further information
Original video animation
Yu Yu Hakusho: Eizou Hakusho
Directed by	Noriyuki Abe
Music by	Yusuke Honma
Studio	Studio Pierrot
Released	September 21, 1994 – February 7, 1996
Runtime	25 minutes
Episodes	6
Original video animation
Yu Yu Hakusho: Two Shots / All or Nothing
Directed by	Noriyuki Abe
Studio	Studio Pierrot
Released	October 26, 2018
Runtime	15 minutes
Episodes	2

YuYu Hakusho (Japanese: 幽☆遊☆白書, Hepburn: Yū Yū Hakusho), also known as Yu Yu Hakusho: Ghost Files, is a Japanese anime television series based on Yoshihiro Togashi's manga series YuYu Hakusho and produced by Studio Pierrot. Covering the entire storyline of the manga, the series follows the adventures of Yusuke Urameshi who after dying in a car accident and after encountering Botan is now tasked to complete tasks from the Spiritual World in order to return to his world as well as fighting supernatural threats.

The series aired on Fuji Television and its affiliates from October 1992 to January 1995, and spawned two films, several OVAs, two drama albums, and multiple video games, toys and other merchandise. Two OVAs commemorating the anime's 25th anniversary were released in October 2018.

YuYu Hakusho is considered to be one of the best anime series of all time.

== Cast ==
Character	Japanese voice actor	English voice actor (Funimation)	English voice actor (Animax)
Yusuke Urameshi	Nozomu Sasaki	Justin Cook	Darren Pleavin
Kazuma Kuwabara	Shigeru Chiba	Christopher Sabat	Russell Wait
Kurama	Megumi Ogata	John Burgmeier	Candice Moore
Hiei	Nobuyuki Hiyama	Chuck Huber	Dave Bridges
Koenma	Mayumi Tanaka	Sean Michael Teague	Candice Moore
Genkai	Hisako Kyoda Megumi Hayashibara (young)	Linda Young	Candice Moore
Botan	Sanae Miyuki	Cynthia Cranz	Sarah Hauser
Keiko/Kayko Yukimura (Note: FUNimation's dub uses the spelling Kayko instead of Keiko.)	Yuri Amano	Laura Bailey	Andrea Kwan
Narrator	Tomomichi Nishimura	Kent Williams	Rik Thomas

== Production and release ==
The series was directed by Noriyuki Abe and produced by Fuji Television, Yomiko Advertising and Studio Pierrot. The series, consisting of 112 episodes, aired from October 10, 1992, to January 7, 1995, on Fuji TV and its affiliates. The episodes were released on 23 video cassettes by Pony Canyon from January 1, 1995, to December 6, 1995. They were also released on 28 DVD volumes by Beam Entertainment, with volumes 8–14 released on March 25, 2002, volumes 15–21 released on April 25, 2002, and volumes 22–28 released on May 25, 2002. The anime differed from its manga source material by containing different levels of violence and profanity, as well as minor variations in art style from one to the other. When animating the manga series, Abe took notes from Togashi's illustrations and noted that Yusuke and Kuwabara have opposite school uniforms despite being from the same school which he found weird. He asked the editorial for the manga and they found it suitable. The visual helped to make Yusuke and Kuwabara looked like the yankī delinquent stereotype seen in other works. When Kurama and Hiei joined the main cast, the anime staff liked the contrasting colors the protagonists have, linking them to popular tokusatsu series. The team also decided to tone down the appearances of Yusuke's mother when it came to seeing his son fight. For the ending, the creators ended up shaping the end according to the manga while interspersing an original screenplay, summarizing it in a structure in which Yusuke returned after a few years in contrast to the manga where he immediately returns alongside Kurama. Mari Kitayama, a lead character designer for the anime stated that she considers Kuwabara to be the most difficult character to design. Kitayama finds Kurama to be the easiest of the main characters to design due to his well-proportioned features and considers Hiei to be her favorite.

Yusuke is voiced by Nozomu Sasaki in Japanese. His performance appealed to Togashi due to how he developed his identity. Before the anime adaptation of YuYu Hakusho started, Sasaki had been a fan of the series and wanted to do the role of the lead thanks to how Togashi drew him. He also liked the personality Yusuke is given as he always says what is in his mind enough to admire him. Togashi was greatly impressed by Shigeru Chiba's voice depiction of Kuwabara, admitting that the actor understood the character better than Togashi himself. When animating the manga series, there was talk of casting either Hiei or Kurama as a female cast member, and the station producer said, it would be Kurama due to his androgynous, naive-looking looks. As a result, Hiei was voiced by the male actor Nobuyuki Hiyama, while Kurama was voiced by the female voice actress Megumi Ogata. Hiyama initially gave Hiei an intimidating aura in order to give Yusuke fear. As a result, he was surprised when the character became supporting. When talking about the character, Hiyama says he is constantly moody and is balanced with the notable power he exposes. Due to this cold portrayal the character has, Hiyama noticed there was a massive change when his sister Yukine was introduced and Hiei was bothered by how Yusuke and Kurama casually mocked this state of weakness. In response to positive response to the handling of the leads, Hiyama said that Hiei and Kurama might also become enemies in future episodes. After receiving many letters both praising and criticizing the voice actors, Togashi clarified that he had no involvement in the anime adaptation.

=== Localization ===
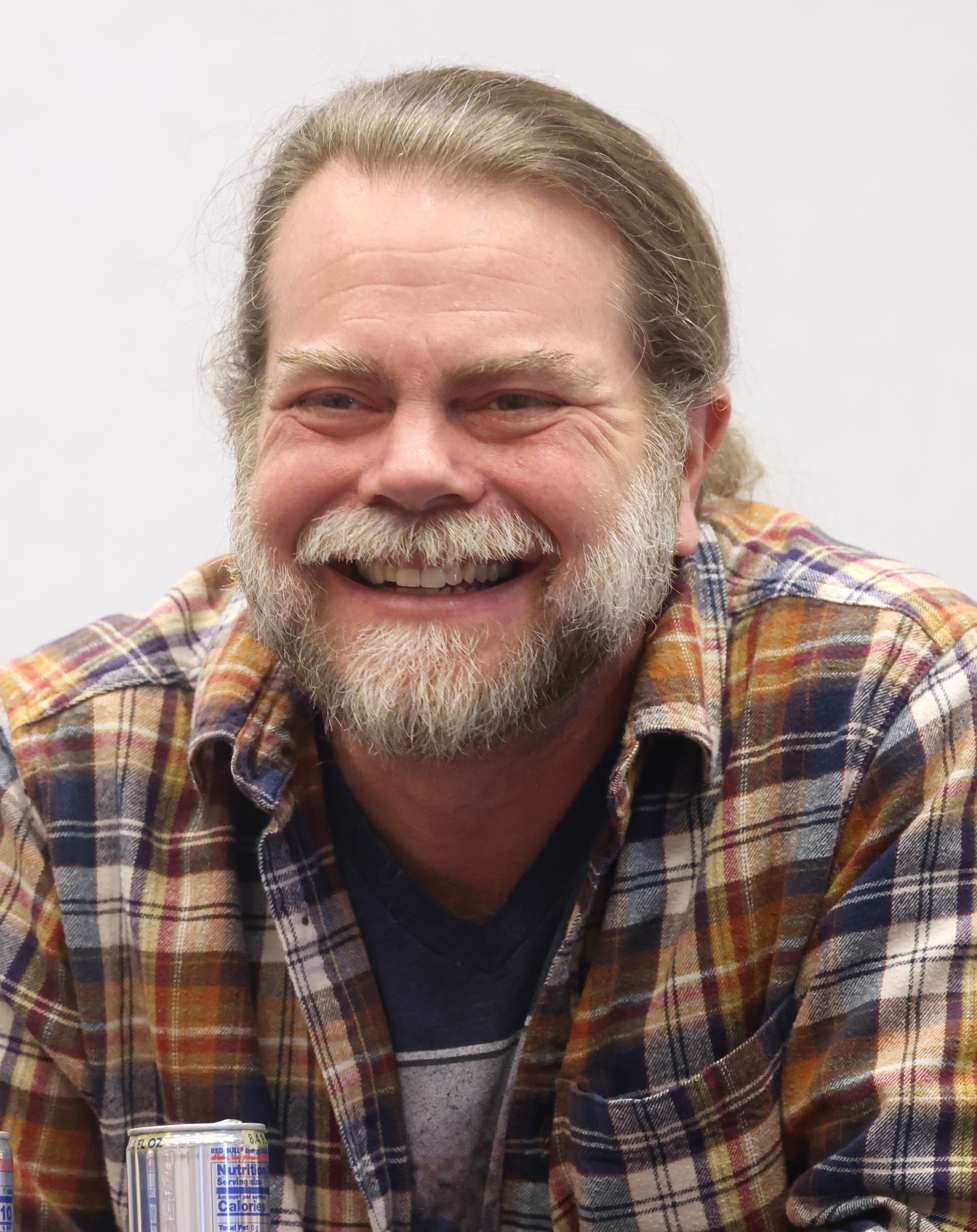
Besides directing the Funimation dub of the series, Justin Cook also voiced Yusuke Urameshi.

In early 2001, the series was acquired by Funimation Entertainment for North American distribution as Yu Yu Hakusho: Ghost Files. Funimation's production saw a significant contribution from voice actor Justin Cook, who not only directed the dub but also voiced the protagonist Yusuke. Cook was a fan of YuYu Hakusho before being given the role of the protagonist, who he always cared about. Originally, he was not being cast for the role but was just the voice director instead. The producers had a hard time deciding who would voice the lead until one of them found Cook to be suitable for the role, which excited the actor. He considered Yusuke unique thanks to his friendly side despite being a delinquent, which allows him to relate to the audiences. Cook enjoyed Yusuke's characterization as a caring teenager with several friends despite initially being seen as a delinquent. He especially enjoyed Yusuke and Keiko's interactions in the anime.

The American-produced English dubbed episodes aired from February 23, 2002, to April 1, 2006, on Cartoon Network. Initially, the series was shown on the channel's Adult Swim programming block from February 2002 to April 2003, but was later moved to Toonami. Some of the show's original depictions of mature content including violence, sexual humor, and coarse language, as well as some controversial cultural discrepancies were edited out for broadcast. Yu Yu Hakusho was taken off Toonami around March 2005 and moved to an early Saturday morning time slot that October where the series finished its run. It was also aired uncut as part of the Funimation programming block on Colours TV in 2006 and the Funimation Channel in high-definition in 2011. Following Sony's acquisition of Crunchyroll, the series was moved to Crunchyroll.

The series was distributed in the United Kingdom by MVM Films and in Australia and New Zealand by Madman Entertainment. In India the English-language version of the series was released as Ghost Fighter.

Yu Yu Hakusho was localized in the Philippines as Ghost Fighter and aired on IBC in the mid-1990s, as well as on GMA Network in 1998. This dub, in Tagalog, localized the characters' names, such as changing "Yusuke" to "Eugene". At the time the World Wide Web was not yet widely available in the Philippines, and the creators of the dub had received limited information on the television series and its characters. Therefore they mistakenly believed Kurama was a female character, assigning the name Denise, and that Genkai was a male character, assigning the name Jeremiah. In regards to the former, after the dubbers learned Kurama was male, a later episode explained that Denise, now with the real name Dennis, is a male character pretending to be female. The voice actor for Hiei (named Vincent in the dub), Montreal Repuyan, stated that analog equipment was used and that at times the voice actors would share a single microphone.

Funimation separated the series into four "seasons", that each compose their own story arc, which they refer to as "sagas". In North America, 32 DVD compilations have been released by Funimation for the four sagas, with the first released on April 16, 2002, and the last on July 19, 2005. The episodes have been released in both edited and uncut formats. In addition, DVD collection boxes have been released for all four sagas, each containing all the episodes of that particular saga, except for the Dark Tournament Saga, which was split into two collection boxes. Funimation released season box sets of the anime starting with season one on July 8, 2008, and ending with season four on January 13, 2009. Each set contains four DVDs which have 28 episodes, or one-quarter of the whole series. Funimation began releasing the seasons on Blu-ray Disc on May 31, 2011. Cook has stated that the production staff made minor improvements to their recordings, such as redubbing certain lines, cleaning up the dialogue, and removing "arrant anomalies". In Japan, three separate multi-disc DVD box sets were released, as well as 28 DVDs totaling all 112 episodes of the series. Japanese home video distributor Bandai Visual began releasing the series on Blu-ray Disc on October 27, 2009, with the first set containing a picture drama set after the end of the series that saw cast members reunite to record new dialogue.

== Music and audio dramas ==
The music for the Yu Yu Hakusho anime adaptation was composed by Yusuke Honma. The series has one opening theme, "Hohoemi no Bakudan" (微笑みの爆弾, Hohoemi no Bakudan; lit. 'Smile Bomb') by Matsuko Mawatari, as well as five closing themes: "Homework ga Owaranai" (ホームワークが終わらない, Hōmuwāku ga Owaranai; lit. 'Homework Never Ends'), "Sayonara ByeBye" (さよならByeBye, Sayonara ByeBye; lit. 'Goodbye ByeBye') and "Daydream Generation" also by Mawatari; and "Unbalance na Kiss o Shite" (アンバランスなKissをして, Anbaransu na Kiss o Shite; lit. 'Give Me An Unbalanced Kiss') and "Taiyō ga Mata Kagayaku Toki" (太陽がまた輝くとき, Taiyō ga Mata Kagayaku Toki; lit. 'When The Sun Shines Again') by Hiro Takahashi. When Funimation gained rights to the series, English language versions of each of these songs were produced and arranged by musician Carl Finch. The localized opening theme is sung by Sara White and the closing themes are sung by members of the English cast including Stephanie Nadolny, Jerry Jewell, and Meredith McCoy.

Several audio CDs have been released in Japan. The Yū Yū Hakusho Original Soundtrack was released in two volumes by Pony Canyon on January 18, 1997. The discs contain the show's instrumental tracks and some vocal themes. Also released on that day is Yū Yū Hakusho: Music Battle, a series of three albums featuring vocal tracks sung by the Japanese voice actors as their corresponding characters. Compilations of vocal songs including Yū Yū Hakusho Super Covers, Yū Yū Hakusho Super Dance Mix, and Legend of Yu Yu Hakusho: "Sai-Kyou" Best Selection Album were released on December 16, 1995, March 21, 1996, and March 21, 1997, respectively. Yū Yū Hakusho: Collective Songs and Yū Yū Hakusho: Collective Rare Trax, which contain covers of the theme songs performed by the series' voice actors, were both released on March 17, 1999. A CD soundtrack for the second film and a maxi single with the vocal songs of Mawatari and Takahashi have also been published.

Two drama albums featuring the cast from the anime have been released by Shueisha. The first, released on December 10, 2004, adapts Yusuke's first encounters with Kurama and Hiei and the manga chapter "Yu Yu Hakusho Tales: Two Shot". The second, released on March 25, 2005, adapts the "After the Party", "Sink or Swim", and "And So..." chapters.

== Original video animations ==
A series of six Yu Yu Hakusho original video animations collectively titled Eizou Hakusho (映像白書, Eizō Hakusho; lit. 'Image Report') was released in Japan in VHS format between 1994 and 1996. The OVAs feature very short clips that take place after the end of the series. They also contain video montages from the anime, image songs, voice actor interviews, and satirical animated shorts focusing on the four protagonists. For their DVD release, the Eizou Hakusho OVAs were combined into three two-in-one sets, all released on January 19, 2005.

Yu Yu Hakusho Opening & Ending Theme Encyclopedia was released on VHS on October 20, 1995, and DVD on January 19, 2005.

Two new Yu Yu Hakusho OVAs were released with the fourth Blu-ray box set of the television series on October 26, 2018, in Japan. Two Shots, which adapts the "Two Shot" bonus chapter from the manga's seventh volume, and All or Nothing, which adapts the manga's penultimate chapter "Sink or Swim".

Funimation Entertainment released the Eizou Hakusho and Opening & Ending Theme Encyclopedia OVAs in a DVD set, together with Yu Yu Hakusho: The Movie, in North America on December 13, 2011, as Yu Yu Hakusho: The Movie & Eizou Hakusho. It features a newly-created English dub with their original voice cast from the anime television series. It does not include the interviews with the Japanese cast. Funimation included Two Shots and All or Nothing in their North American release of the Blu-ray box set of the entire television series on January 31, 2023, including an English dub.

Title	Release date
Yu Yu Hakusho Eizou Hakusho: Dark Tournament, Vol. 1 (幽☆遊☆白書 映像白書~暗黒武術会の章~上巻)	1994-09-21
Yu Yu Hakusho Eizou Hakusho: Dark Tournament, Vol. 2 (幽☆遊☆白書 映像白書~暗黒武術会の章~下巻)	1994-10-05
Yu Yu Hakusho Opening & Ending Encyclopedia (幽☆遊☆白書 オープニングエンディング大百科(エンサイクロペディア))	1995-10-20
Yu Yu Hakusho Eizou Hakusho II: The Yusuke Chapters (幽☆遊☆白書 映像白書II~幽助の章~)	1995-12-16
Yu Yu Hakusho Eizou Hakusho II: The Kurama Chapters (幽☆遊☆白書 映像白書II~蔵馬の章~)	1996-01-01
Yu Yu Hakusho Eizou Hakusho II: The Hiei Chapters (幽☆遊☆白書 映像白書II~飛影の章~)	1996-01-29
Yu Yu Hakusho Eizou Hakusho II: The Kuwabara Chapters (幽☆遊☆白書 映像白書II~桑原の章~)	1996-02-07
Yu Yu Hakusho: Two Shots / All or Nothing (幽☆遊☆白書 TWO SHOTS/のるかそるか)	2018-10-26

== Video games ==
During the show's original run, 15 video games were released, primarily from Sega, which at that time were released exclusively on their systems as well as Tomy and Namco which released titles exclusive to Nintendo's systems, primarily the Game Boy and the Super NES. Due to the show's popularity in rebroadcasts and international releases, additional games were developed and published during the 2000s, mainly for the PlayStation 2.

Atari had a three-game deal signed with Funimation in 2003 which led to the creation of three games, these games being Yu Yu Hakusho: Spirit Detective and Yu Yu Hakusho: Tournament Tactics for the Game Boy Advance as well as Yu Yu Hakusho: Dark Tournament for the PlayStation 2.

== Reception ==
The Yu Yu Hakusho television series was voted the best anime of the year in the 1994 and 1995 Animage Anime Grand Prix and the second best in 1993 after Sailor Moon. Additionally, the publication declared the series number 53 on its top 100 anime listing in 2001. In a 2006 web poll conducted in Japan by the network TV Asahi, Yu Yu Hakusho was voted as the fifteenth best anime of all time. The Japanese magazine Brutus voted it the sixth best anime of all time. The hit show garnered a large number of viewers during its run in Japan. Funimation president Gen Fukunaga remarked that Yu Yu Hakusho "came 'out of nowhere' to surprise people with huge ratings", which were just below those achieved by the popular series Dragon Ball Z. Yu Yu Hakusho was frequently watched by several age groups during its early run in North America. When it aired on Adult Swim, the anime, along with others such as Inuyasha and Cowboy Bebop, met with male audiences ages 18–34. During its Toonami debut in May 2003, Yu Yu Hakusho placed in seven out of the top 111 Nielsen ratings for Cartoon Network telecasts, with the highest being number 30 on May 13 at a two percent share of all viewing televisions in the country. Atari stated in December 2003 that the anime was one of the top-rated television programs in North America for males ages 9–14. Nielsen additionally reported that Yu Yu Hakusho tied with Dragon Ball GT as the top-rated Cartoon Network program for the same demographic during the week of September 28, 2004. It was the second highest-rated show among ages 12–17 the same week. However, Cartoon Network eventually dropped the show from Toonami in March 2005 due to declining ratings.

Yu Yu Hakusho proved to be popular in the Philippines, where it was rerun several times and managed to draw more viewers in the prime time slot than both local and foreign soap operas. In 2023 Chad de Guzman of Time wrote that "mentioning it to viewers in the Philippines is bound to induce nostalgia in anyone who came of age during its run[...]" The phrase "Tapusin! Tapusin!" (meaning "Finish him! Finish him!"), used by enemy characters watching tournaments in the Tagalog dub, became a catchphrase among anime watchers in that country.

The animated series received a generally positive reception in North America. In January 2004, Yu Yu Hakusho was named the second best action-adventure anime by Anime Insider. It was voted by the users of IGN as the tenth best-animated series of all time. Critical reviews focused on the series' attempt at a versatile balance of narrative, character development, and action sequences. Animerica's Justin Kovalsky defined Yu Yu Hakusho as a character-driven series and compared it to other anime like Phantom Quest Corp., Rurouni Kenshin, and Flame of Recca in that it successfully combines different ideas such as martial arts battles, character dynamics, the supernatural, and mythology. Allen Divers of the Anime News Network identified Yu Yu Hakusho as "one of the best action series out there", and noted consistently good storytelling and character development throughout his critique of key points of the series. Todd Douglass Jr. of DVD Talk declared, "It's a fun show with a great cast, a sense of humor, and a lot of action so there's no excuse not to at least give it a chance." He recommended the first three-season box sets of Yu Yu Hakusho, as well as the original box set of the Three Kings Saga, but enjoyed the show's third season more than the others because of its multiple plotlines. N. S. Davidson of IGN concluded that having several concurrent plot branches is not enough for an anime to succeed, but that good writing, interesting characters, and action are also necessary. He proclaimed in his review of the anime's final episodes that Yu Yu Hakusho possesses all of these qualities. This was concurred upon by Joseph Luster of Otaku USA, who summed up his feelings about the universe of Yu Yu Hakusho by stating, "Togashi's world is eternally hellish and dark, but wildly varied. The only thing that doesn't change throughout its run is the fact that you'll still be rooting for the well-defined protagonists until the credits run on the last episode."

Jeffrey Harris of IGN was more critical when looking at later episodes, and felt that the end of the show's third arc involving the villain Sensui is too similar to the finale of the second arc with Toguro. He described the episodes as trying too hard to draw sympathy from the audience for the anime's villains. Despite his overall praise of Yu Yu Hakusho, Divers noted in a review about one DVD release that the show "[walks] that fine line of a solid long-running series or being a broken record". He also called the artwork of the first few episodes "dated" and pointed out questionable script choices regarding the English dub.

Aedan Juvet of Funimation called the anime influential and "timeless" with classic villains, highlighting five villains in the series which helped the anime evolve.
