= Yu Yu Hakusho: Sai-Kyou Best Selection Album =

Soundtrack album / Compilation by Various Artists
- Released: March 21, 1997
- Recorded: 1992–1996
- Genres: Television score, dance, new wave, Anime OST
- Length: 74:52
- Label: Pony Canyon (PCCG-399)

Yu☆Yu☆Hakusho – "SAI-KYOU" Best Selection Album (幽☆遊☆白書 最強ベストセレクション, Yū Yū Hakusho Saikyō Besuto Korekushon) is a compilation album released for the Japanese TV series YuYu Hakusho. The album was published on March 21, 1997, by Pony Canyon.

The album includes hit songs that were featured in the YuYu Hakusho series like "Hohoemi no Bakudan" (JP #45) and "Unbalance na Kiss wo Shite" (JP #28) and pop ballad "Taiyou ga Mata Kagayaku Toki" (JP #9).

== Content ==
The album features opening and ending theme songs to YuYu Hakusho series, namely "Sayonara Bye Bye", "Hohoemi no Bakudan", "Daydream Generation" and "Unbalanced kisses".

Numerous tracks are sung by voice actors who originally portrayed the YuYu Hakusho characters including Kurama (Megumi Ogata), Yusuke (Nozomu Sasaki), Kuwabara (Shigeru Chiba) and Hiei (Nobuyuki Hiyama).

== Album ==
=== Track listing ===
#	Song (original)	Rōmaji, translation	Musician	Writer	Length
01.	微笑みの爆弾	Hohoemi no Bakudan ("Smile bomb")	Matsuko Mawatari	Matsuko Mawatari, Hsiao-Lung Lee	4:13
02.	Dead or Alive 〜闘神〜		Nozomu Sasaki	Toshiyuki Mori, Ginshiro Akiya	4:59
03.	氷のナイフを抱いて	Koori No Naifu Wo Daite ("Embracing the Ice Knife")	Megumi Ogata	Mori Yuriko, Kenji Yamamoto	4:43
04.	口笛が聴こえる	Kuchibue ga kikoeru ("I Hear A Whistle")	Nobuyuki Hiyama	Ren Takayanagi, Masaki Akashio	4:37
05.	アンバランスなKissをして	Anbaransu na kiss wo Shite ("Doing Unbalanced Kissing")	Hiro Takahashi	Hiro Takahashi, Hiroshi Yamada	3:51
06.	さよならbyebye	"Sayonara Bye bye"	Yuriko Mori	Matsuko Mawatari, Hsiao-Lung Lee	4:29
07.	太陽がまた輝くとき	Taiyou ga mata Kagayatoki ("The Sun Will Shine Again")	Hiro Takahashi	Hiro Takahashi	5:22
08.	流星のソリチュード	Ryuusei no Solitude ("Solitude Of A Falling Star")	Nobuyuki Hiyama	Takashi Kojima, Yasutaka Mizushima	5:13
09.	サヨナラは未来のはじまり	Sayonara wa Mirai no Hajimari ("A Goodbye Is The Beginning Of Tomorrow")	Megumi Ogata	Yuriko Mori, Takefumi Haneda	5:45
10.	永遠にTHANK YOU!	Eien ni THANKYOU! ("Thank You Forever")	Shigeru Chiba	Toshiyuki Mori, Ginshirou Akitani	5:45
11.	ALL RIGHT!	—	Nozomu Sasaki	Kenji Matsuo, Kana Matsumoto	4:25
12.	EYE TO EYE!	—	Shigeru Chiba, Megumi Ogata, Nobuyuki Hiyama	Takashi Kojima, Kenji Yamamoto	3:59
13.	WILD WIND~野性の風のように~	~Yasei no kaze no you ni~ ("Like the Wind in the Wilderness")	Megumi Ogata, Nobuyuki Hiyama	Yuriko Mori, Kenji Yamamoto	4:21
14.	ホームワークが終わらない	Homework ga Owaranai ("The Homework Never Ends")	Matsuko Mawatari	Matsuko Mawatari, Hsiao-Lung Li	4:51
15.	デイドリーム ジェネレーション	"Daydream Generation"	Matsuko Mawatari	Matsuko Mawatari, Hsiao-Lung Li	4:14
16.	僕たちの季節	Boku-tachi no Kisetsu "Our Seasons")	Nozomu Sasaki, Shigeru Chiba, Megumi Ogata, Nobuyuki Hiyama	Kenji Matsuo, Rie Hamada	4:51
