= Hohoemi no Bakudan =

- 8cm Single cover

Single by Matsuko Mawatari

from the album Nice Unbalance
- Released: November 6, 1992
- Genre: Dance-pop, new wave, pop
- Length: 4:10
- Label: Media Remoras
- Songwriters: Matsuko Mawatari, Hsiao-Lung Lee

Matsuko Mawatari singles chronology
"Kimi wa Shinzō Yaburi" (1992)	"Hohoemi no Bakudan" (1992)	"P-U" (1993)

"Hohoemi no Bakudan" (Japanese: 微笑みの爆弾, Hepburn: Hohoemi no Bakudan; The Smile Bomb) is a 1992 single recorded by Japanese singer-songwriter Matsuko Mawatari. This is her second single from her second album Nice Unbalance. It reached the 45 position on the Japanese charts in 1992 and again in 2005, reaching number 187 for one week. "Hohoemi no Bakudan" in 2004 was, however, charted together with the song "Unbalance na Kiss wo Shite" (アンバランスなkissをして, Unbalanced to Kiss) by Hiro Takahashi. B-side of the single features a song from her first album Aitashi Gakunari Gatashi (逢いたし学なりがたし), "Homework ga Owaranai" (ホームワークが終らない, Hōmuwāku ga Owaranai; The Homework's Never Done)".

This song also became the opening theme of the anime series YuYu Hakusho and is included on its compilation album Sai-Kyou Best Selection Album.

== Cover versions ==
- Shoko Nakagawa, Shoko-tan Cover 3: Anison wa Jinrui o Tsunagu (2010)
- Megumi Ogata, album YuYu Hakusho (collective rare trax)
- Mariya Ise
- Atsuko Enomoto
- Atsushi Abe
- Hisayoshi Suganuma
- Marina Inoue
- Sara White
- Hiroko Moriguchi, Anison Covers 2 (2024)

== Track listing ==
=== 1992 release ===
Side 1
No.	Title	Length
1.	"微笑みの爆弾"	4:10
2.	"ホームワークが終らない"	4:50

=== 2005 release ===
Side 1
No.	Title	Version	Length
1.	"微笑みの爆弾" (by Mawatari)	（vocal）
2.	"アンバランスなKISSをして" (by Takahashi)	（vocal）
3.	"太陽がまた輝くとき" (by Takahashi)	（vocal）
4.	"微笑みの爆弾" (by Mawatari)	（DJ YEBISU REMIX）
5.	"アンバランスなKISSをして" (by Takahashi)	（TABATA REMIX）
6.	"微笑みの爆弾" (by Mawatari)	（inst.）
7.	"アンバランスなKISSをして" (by Takahashi)	（inst.）
8.	"太陽がまた輝くとき" (by Takahashi)	（inst.）

== Chart positions ==
=== Charts ===
Chart (1992)	Peak position
Japan Pop	#45
Chart (2004)	Peak position
Japan Pop	#187
