= Nobuyuki Hiyama =

Japanese voice actor and narrator (born 1967)

- 檜山 修之
- Born: 25 August 1967 (age 59); Hatsukaichi, Hiroshima, Japan
- Other names: Hiichan (ひーちゃん); The King of Braves (勇者王, Yūsha Ō)
- Occupation: Voice actor
- Years active: 1989–present
- Agent: Arts Vision
- Notable credits: Bleach as Ikkaku Madarame; YuYu Hakusho as Hiei; The King of Braves GaoGaiGar as Gai Shishioh; Fatal Fury & The King of Fighters as Joe Higashi; The Legend of Zelda: Ocarina of Time as Link; Tales of Rebirth as Veigue Lungberg
- Height: 166 cm (5 ft 5 in)

Nobuyuki Hiyama (檜山 修之, Hiyama Nobuyuki; born 25 August 1967) is a Japanese voice actor, narrator, and radio personality currently affiliated with Arts Vision.

His vocal register is described as a metallic lyric tenor suitable to voice a mature variation of coming of age young men. Combined with an impactful execution of battle cries, he earned his reputation in voicing heroic protagonists commonly found in works of the mecha, fighting, and fantasy genres. Hiyama is recognized for his portrayal of Hiei from YuYu Hakusho, starring twice within the Brave Series franchise as Maito Senpuuji in The Brave Express Might Gaine and Gai Shishioh in King of Braves GaoGaiGar, and playing Link in The Legend of Zelda: Ocarina of Time.

== Biography ==
Hiyama was born in Hatsukaichi, Hiroshima at the Red Cross Hospital, and grew up enjoying casual amateur baseball with friends. His mother was of Japanese descent, born in Taiwan during the end of World War II and resettling back in Japan after the war.

Greatly influenced by his father, Hiyama flourished in history and social studies class since middle school, but was not fond of the idea of participating in extracurricular activities. Despite this, Hiyama had no choice but to pick up at least one activity for each semester due to school regulations, and ended up trying out Go, Shogi, and his school's Radio Club by his second year of middle school. According to Hiyama, his middle school radio club experience was "in all honesty, awful." and he "was bored to the point of resigning from the club" by his third year, ending his middle school club life with Japanese calligraphy.

Upon entering high school, Hiyama believed he could "finally start pursuing his dream of not participating in any school clubs," but ended up being reluctantly dragged into his high school's radio club due to a close schoolmate of his wanting to join the club, yet not wanting to enter the club alone. Hiyama noted his high school radio club experience was "far more interesting" than he expected, as "we get to plan on what to broadcast for morning assembly, and not only that, we even produce our own radio dramas." It was through his interest in radio dramas, along with awareness of the voice acting boom of the 70s and 80s, that made Hiyama took notice early on that there were career opportunities in voice acting and that Tokyo had the training schools for them.

When the time came for Hiyama to plan his career development during his senior year of high school, he resorted to the mindset of "if I had to bread-win, might as well choose the type of bread that I love to eat." Therefore, his first choice was to apply for college to become a historian, while his second choice was to go into "something in relation to voice work," since he reflected on how his radio club experience was the one that made him believe this would be the lifestyle that he would truly enjoy. Due to the tough application requirements of his intended history major, Hiyama decided to pursue the path of voice acting, and talked it over with his parents. Hiyama recalled their discussion "ended in dispute," with his parents' decision to not support his tuition in fear of "a business that is unheard of." Hiyama was then left to fend for himself by enrolling into Tokyo Announce Gakuin's (now Tokyo Announce Gakuin Performing Arts College) Broadcasting Voice Actor major through Japan's Newspaper Scholarship grant.

=== Training and debut ===
Due to the lack of financial support from his parents, Hiyama took on his major's scholarship recipient training course to make room in fulfilling his required deeds to give back to his scholarship sponsors. He met his basic needs in Tokyo by part-timing at newsagencies delivering newspapers around his neighborhood, while his tuition was covered by his grant. His daily routine consisted of a "grueling 3:00 am to 9:00 pm schedule" between work and voice acting studies, which "really grinded his mentality and physicality."

Upon his graduation from Tokyo Announce Gakuin, Hiyama continued his performance training under his alma mater's homeroom instructor via Arts Vision's Nihon Narration Engi Kenkyujyo (Japan Narration Performing Arts Research Center), and was scouted by Arts Vision's group of managers while he was rehearsing for his first stage performance.

Debuting as a mummy in the OVA version of the original Kaiketsu Zorori anime in 1989, Hiyama spent most of his beginner years continuing to deliver newspapers, while also continuing his performance training whenever he did not receive voice-acting cases to work. He was also noted to have part-timed as a security guard for a time, and mentioned how he deliberately hid his face in case his colleagues saw him during a period where he had to overlook a construction site near his recording studio.

=== Career breakthrough ===
Hiyama's first official role was as the principal villain character Syndrome in Chikyuu SOS Soreike Kororin, a 1992 environmentalist anime television program spanning a half-year recording schedule. With his Kororin gig ending and worrying where his next paycheck would be, he received his agency's call to audition for YuYu Hakusho. According to his commentary within Yu Yu Hakusho's Blu-ray release, he first auditioned solely for the role of Kurama before trying again for Hiei upon receiving the notice for Yu Yu Hakusho's second round of audition, with the latter becoming his most iconic breakthrough character.

== Filmography ==
※ All filmography are organized under Japan's release by year-alphabetical order; roles labeled in Bold are either protagonists, or roles of major importance.

=== Television animation ===
1992

- Chikyuu SOS Soreike Kororin, Syndrome
- YuYu Hakusho, **Hiei**

1993

- Dragon League, Hipro, Garadona
- The Brave Express Might Gaine, **Maito Senpuuji**
- Fatal Fury 2: The New Battle (TV Special), **Joe Higashi**
- Jungle King Tar-chan, **Pedro Kazmaier**

1994

- Shonan Junai Gumi, Kamata Jun
- Captain Tsubasa J, Hyuga Kojiro
- Ginga Sengoku Gun'yūden Rai, **Rai Ryuga**
- Haō Taikei Ryū Knight, Windy
- Tottemo! Luckyman, Kazu, Marui
- Pretty Soldier Sailor Moon S, Yosaku Eda

1995

- Bonobono, Rabi Nii-chan
- Fushigi Yûgi, Hikitsu
- Marmalade Boy, William "Bill" Matheson
- Pretty Soldier Sailor Moon SuperS, Tsunawataro

1996

- B't X, **Teppei Takamiya**
- Rurouni Kenshin, Heihachiro Sasaki, Daigorō Ōkuma
- Slayers Next, Joe
- The Vision of Escaflowne, Ort

1997

- The King of Braves GaoGaiGar, **Gai Shishiou**
- Pokémon, Akira (A.J.)

1998

- Gasaraki, **Yuushiro Gowa**
- Initial D, Takeshi Nakazato
- Yu-Gi-Oh!, Tetsuo Sasaki, Dragon

1999

- Cowboy Bebop, Shin
- Detective Conan, Makoto Kyogoku
- Infinite Ryvius, Airs Blue

2000

- Hamtaro, Norio
- Digimon Adventure 02, BlackWarGreymon

2001

- One Piece, Mr. 3
- Pokémon Chronicles, Attila
- Project ARMS, Cliff Gilbert

2002

- .hack//Sign, Balmung
- Cheeky Angel, **Ichimonji Kobayashi**
- Digimon Frontier, Seraphimon
- G-On Riders, Ichiro Hongo
- Hikaru no Go, Shūhei
- Ultimate Muscle, Bone Cold
- Mobile Suit Gundam SEED, Muruta Azrael

2003

- .hack//Legend of the Twilight, Balmung
- Astro Boy: Mighty Atom (2003), Atlas
- Bobobo-bo Bo-bobo, Mean Green Soup Alien
- Cromartie High School, Pootan
- Godannar, Tetsuya Kouji
- Planetes, Kho Cheng-Shin
- Pokémon: Advanced Challenge, Noland

2004

- Genshiken, **Harunobu Madarame**
- Grenadier - The Senshi of Smiles, Teppa Aizen
- RockMan.EXE Stream, Rei Saiko
- The Prince of Tennis, Jackal Kuwahara
- School Rumble, Harry McKenzie
- Keroro Gunsō, **Kogoro**
- Transformers: Superlink, **Skyfire**
- Yakitate!! Japan, Tesshō Iwashiro (ep.54)

2005

- Bleach, Ikkaku Madarame
- Magical Girl Lyrical Nanoha A's, Masked Warriors
- Pokémon: Battle Frontier, Jonathan
- Tsubasa Chronicle, Shōgo Asagi

2006

- Air Gear, Magaki
- Muteki Kanban Musume, **Kankuro Nishiyama**
- Ryūsei no Rockman, Ox
- School Rumble (Second Season), Harry McKenzie, Masked Kamen, Narrator
- Saiunkoku Monogatari, **Kōyū Ri**
- Kinnikuman II-Sei, Bone Cold
- Wan Wan Celeb Soreyuke! Tetsunoshin, Kochi Hijikata
- Yakitate!! Japan, Iwashiro Tesshou from Wild Life
- Yoshimune, **Yoshimune**

2007

- Gintama, Eldest Paruko Brother
- Tengen Toppa Gurren-Lagann, **Viral**, Old Coco
- Hayate the Combat Butler, Cyborg Butler
- Moetan, Kaks
- Shinkyoku Sōkai Polyphonica, Yardio Voda Munagoul
- Tetsuko no Tabi, **Hirohiko Yokomi**

2008

- Kimi ga Aruji de Shitsuji ga Ore de, **Kojuurou**
- Macademi Wasshoi!, Professor Frankram Stein
- Mnemosyne, **Kōki Maeno**
- Pokémon: DP: Galactic Battles, Palmer
- Rosario + Vampire, Saizo Komiya

2009

- Eden of the East, Yutaka Itazu
- Shin Koihime Musō, Kada

2010

- Digimon Xros Wars, SlashAngemon
- Highschool of the Dead, Kouta Hirano
- The Tatami Galaxy, Johnny

2011

- Double-J, **Ichirō Toba**
- Naruto: Shippuden, Bandō
- Sket Dance, Kunio Yamanobe

2012

- Accel World, Sulfur Pot
- Humanity Has Declined, Oyage
- Kamisama Kiss, Maki Kohirui
- Saint Seiya Ω, Libra Genbu
- Sword Art Online, Diabel

2013

- Battle Spirits: Saikyou Ginga Ultimate Zero, **Ultimate-Kingtaurus**, God of Darkness Bomber
- Kill La Kill, **Uzu Sanageyama**
- Kingdom (Second Season), Kaishibou
- Kuroko's Basketball, Daisuke Narumi
- My Youth Love Comedy Is Wrong As I Expected., **Yoshiteru Zaimokuza**

2014

- Tokyo Ghoul, Enji Koma
- D-Frag!, RaGaiGar (ep 5)
- Duel Masters VS, **Sasaki Kojirou**
- M3 the dark metal, Aoshi Saginuma
- Nanatsu no Taizai, Jude
- Nisekoi, Ryuu
- No-rin, Rintaro Miyamoto
- Shirobako, **Seiichi Kinoshita**

2015

- A Simple Thinking About Blood Type, Blood Type-A Daddy (Ep.6)
- Gate (novel series), Kamikoda
- Samurai Warriors, Date Masamune
- Seiyu's Life!, Yamori
- Unlimited Fafnir, Loki
- Yatterman Night, **General Goro**
- Rin-ne, Wig (ep 9)

2016

- Haven't You Heard? I'm Sakamoto, Ken Ken
- Joker Game, Alain Lernier (ep.3)
- Matoi the Sacred Slayer, Cariot
- Taboo Tattoo, Souha Tamaki
- Time Bokan 24, Yuri Gagarin

2017

- 100% Pascal-sensei, W King Pascal (ep. 25 & 26)
- A Sister's All You Need, Panda
- Boruto: Naruto Next Generations, Shin Uchiha Sr.
- Doraemon (2005), Goro Nobi
- Dragon Ball Super, Barry Kahn (ep.73-74)
- Fate/Apocrypha, Darnic Prestone Yggdmillennia
- Gintama, Pakuyasa
- Kino's Journey -the Beautiful World-, Police Chief (ep.8)
- Love and Lies, Yuuji Nejima
- Love Tyrant, Korari
- Nobunaga no Shinobi, Hachisuka Koroku
- Pokémon Sun and Moon, Kahuna Hala
- Restaurant to Another World, Lionel
- Tiger Mask W, Tiger The Black
- Twin Angel BREAK, Yuito Kisaragi
- Pikaia!, Edward Edwars

2018

- Fist of the Blue Sky: REGENESIS (2018), Yè
- Jūshinki Pandora, Mr. Gold
- Lord of Vermilion: The Crimson King, Van Drail
- Overlord II, Éclair Éklair Éklare
- Pop Team Epic, Hero (also as himself) [First Segment] (ep.02)
- Time Bokan: The Villains' Strike Back, Ludwig van Beethoven (ep.16)
- WORKING BUDDIES! (Season 2), Kamo Shida

2019

- Demon Slayer: Kimetsu no Yaiba , Kasugaigarasu (ep.21)
- Kengan Ashura, Saw Paing Yoroizuka
- Zoids Wild, Truffle

2020

- Auto Boy - Carl from Mobile Land, Pump (Felix) the Fire Engine
- Ikebukuro West Gate Park, Yoshioka
- Journal of the Mysterious Creatures, Data Terminal
- Shadowverse, Sports Announcer
- The God of High School, Drake McDonald
- Tomica Kizuna Gattai Earth Granner, **Gao Granner Leo**

2021

- Back Arrow, Goh Zanga
- Digimon Adventure, Machmon
- Jujutsu Kaisen, Esō
- Restaurant to Another World 2, Lionel
- Scarlet Nexus, Karen Travers
- World Trigger Season 3, Takuma Yuba

2022

- Bleach: Thousand-Year Blood War, Ikkaku Madarame
- Cap Kakumei Bottleman DX, Leo Kinjishi
- Management of a Novice Alchemist, Geberk
- Pop Team Epic Season 2, **Popuko** [Second Segment] (ep.02)
- The Heike Story, Taira no Munemori
- Trapped in a Dating Sim: The World of Otome Games Is Tough for Mobs, Greg Fou Seberg

2023

- By the Grace of the Gods Season 2, Tekun
- Golden Kamuy Season 4, Keiji Ueji
- Kaina of the Great Snow Sea, Handagil
- Magical Destroyers, Itasha Driver

2024

- Blue Exorcist: Shimane Illuminati Saga, Michael Gedōin
- Grandpa and Grandma Turn Young Again, Hajime Takahashi
- Kinnikuman: Perfect Origin Arc, Darmeshiman

2025

- Gachiakuta, Mymo

2026

- The Ghost in the Shell, Krolden
- Young Ladies Don't Play Fighting Games, Gekido
- The Elusive Samurai, Nitta Yoshisada
- Tank Chair, Goro Arashiyama

2027

- The Reincarnated Elf Left on a Journey to Master His Magic, Grillet

=== Original video animation (OVA) ===
1994

- Legend of the Galactic Heroes (Series 3), Bruno von Knapfstein

1995

- Fire Emblem, Cain

1996

- Legend of the Galactic Heroes (Series 4), Bruno von Knapfstein
- Mobile Suit Gundam: The 08th MS Team, **Shiro Amada**
- Ultraman: Super Fighter Legend, Great Demon King Mephilas
- Voltage Fighter Gowcaizer, **Isato Kaiza/Gowcaizer**

1997

- B't X Neo, **Teppei Takamiya**

2000

- The King of Braves GaoGaiGar Final, **Gai Shishioh**

2006

- Fist of the North Star: The Legends of the True Savior, Shuren
- Maria-sama ga Miteru (3rd Season), Suguru Kashiwagi

2007

- Gundam Evolve, **Musha Gundam**
- Kamen Rider Den-O Collection DVD "Imagin Anime 2", Wolf Imagin

2010

- Quiz Magic Academy, Leon

2011

- Mazinkaizer SKL, Kiba

2018

- YuYu Hakusho 25th Anniversary Blu-Ray Special: TWO SHOTS & All or Nothing, **Hiei**

2022

- My Hero Academia, Shishido

=== Original net animation ===
- Overlord: Ple Ple Pleiades (2018, 2022), Éclair Éklair Éklare

=== Online stream animation ===
- Bakumatsu Kikansetsu Irohanihoheto (2006), Hijikata Toshizō
- The Heike Story (2021)

=== Theatrical animation and other motion pictures ===
Year	Title	Role
1993	Yu Yu Hakusho: The Movie	**Hiei**
1994	Fatal Fury: The Motion Picture	**Joe Higashi**
1994	Yu Yu Hakusho the Movie: Poltergeist Report	**Hiei**
1995	Sailor Moon Super S: The Movie (Ami's First Love)	Mercurius
1998	Mobile Suit Gundam: The 08th MS Team Miller's Report	**Shiro Amada**
2005	Mobile Suit Zeta Gundam: A New Translation	Hayato Kobayashi
2006	Bleach: Memories of Nobody	Ikkaku Madarame
2006	Fist of the North Star: The Legends of the True Savior	Shuren
2006	Keroro Gunsō the Super Movie	Kogoro
2012	.hack//The Movie	Balto (Tomohiko Okano's avatar)
2014	Crayon Shin-chan: Serious Battle! Robot Dad Strikes Back	John Yamada
2016	One Piece Film: Gold	Narushi
2017/04/07	The Night Is Short, Walk on Girl	Johnny
2017/04/15	Detective Conan: Crimson Love Letter	Makoto Kyogoku
2017/10/21	Code Geass: Lelouch of the Rebellion—The Awakening Path	Shinichiro Tamaki
2017/12/02 (Japan) 2017/12/08 (Taiwan)	Thunderbolt Fantasy: Sword of Life and Death	**Shā Wú Shēng**
2018/02/10	Code Geass: Lelouch of the Rebellion—The Rebellion Path	Shinichiro Tamaki
2018/05/26	Code Geass: Lelouch of the Rebellion—The Imperial Path	Shinichiro Tamaki
2018/10/06	My Tyrano: Together, Forever	Ruchi
2018/11/14	Yo-kai Watch: Forever Friends	Su-san / Susanoo
2019/04/12	Detective Conan: The Fist of Blue Sapphire	**Makoto Kyogoku**
2019/05/24	Promare	Gueira
2020/02/29	Shirobako: The Movie	Seiichi Kinoshita
2025/03/18	Batman Ninja vs. Yakuza League	The Flash

=== Video games ===
1993

- Flash Hiders, Spenoza Thunderhead

1994

- Vampire: The Night Warriors, Demitri Maximoff, Pyron

1995

- Arc the Lad, Tosh Monji
- Battle Tycoon: Flash Hiders SFX, Spenoza Thunderhead
- Fatal Fury 3: Road to the Final Victory, **Joe Higashi**
- Magical Drop 2, Chariot
- Makeruna! Makendō 2, Makenka
- Vampire Hunter: Darkstalkers' Revenge, **Demitri Maximoff**, Donovan Baine, Pyron, Dee
- Real Bout Fatal Fury, **Joe Higashi**
- Soul Edge, **Siegfried Schtauffen**
- Street Fighter: The Movie, Ken Masters, Vega, Dee Jay, Sawada
- The King of Fighters '95, Joe Higashi
- Voltage Fighter Gowcaizer, **Isato Kaiza/Gowcaizer**

1996

- Last Bronx: Tokyo Bangaichi, Hiroshi "Tommy" Tomiie
- Rockman 8: Metal Heroes, Forte (Bass)
- The King of Fighters '96, Joe Higashi
- Star Ocean, Ioshua Jerand & Dorne Murtough (SNES Original)
- YU-NO: A girl who chants love at the bound of this world, Takuya Arima

1997

- Ghost in the Shell, Saito
- Mega Man Battle & Chase, Forte (Bass)
- Other Life: Azure Dreams, Ghosh Rode
- Ray Tracers, Sleoteel Raze
- Real Bout Fatal Fury Special, **Joe Higashi**
- Rival Schools: United by Fate, **Batsu Ichimonji**
- Soulcalibur, **Nightmare, Siegfried Schtauffen**, Yoshimitsu
- The King of Fighters '97, Joe Higashi

1998

- Real Bout Fatal Fury 2: The Newcomers, **Joe Higashi**
- Vampire Savior: The Lord of Vampire, **Demitri Maximoff**
- The King of Fighters '98, Joe Higashi
- The King of Fighters: Kyo, Joe Higashi
- The Legend of Zelda: Ocarina of Time, **Link (adult)**

1999

- Buriki One, **Gai Tendo**
- Everybody's Golf 2, Takuya
- Fatal Fury: Wild Ambition, **Joe Higashi**
- Legacy of Kain: Soul Reaver **Raziel** (Japanese dub)
- Little Princess: Marl Ōkoku no Ningyō Hime 2, Randy
- Super Smash Bros., **Link (adult)**
- The King of Fighters '99, Joe Higashi

2000

- Project Justice, **Batsu Ichimonji**
- The Legend of Zelda: Majora's Mask, **Fierce Deity Link**
- The King of Fighters 2000, Joe Higashi

2001

- Capcom vs. SNK 2: Millionaire Fighting 2001, Joe Higashi, Batsu Ichimonji
- Digimon Rumble Arena, BlackWarGreymon
- Initial D Arcade Stage, Takeshi Nakazato
- Super Smash Bros. Melee, **Link (adult)**
- The King of Fighters 2001, Joe Higashi

2002

- .hack Series, **Balmung**
- Galaxy Angel, Guinness Stout
- La Pucelle: Tactics, Homard
- Soul Reaver 2, **Raziel**
- Soulcalibur II, **Nightmare/Siegfried Schtauffen**, Yoshimitsu, Link
- The King of Fighters 2002, Joe Higashi
- The Legend of Zelda: Ocarina of Time Master Quest, **Link (adult)**
- Tokimeki Memorial Girl's Side, **Kazuma Suzuka**
- Xenosaga, Wilhelm

2003

- SNK vs. Capcom: SVC Chaos, Demitri Maximoff, Announcer
- The King of Fighters 2003, Joe Higashi

2004

- Capcom Fighting Jam, Demitri Maximoff
- Sengoku Musou series, Date Masamune, Fūma Kotarō, Honganji Kennyo
- Tales of Rebirth, **Veigue Lungberg**

2005

- Fushigi Yûgi Genbu Kaiden Gaiden: Kagami no Miko, **Hikitsu**
- Kagero II: Dark Illusion, Jais
- Namco × Capcom, Janga, Demitri Maximoff
- Soulcalibur III, **Siegfried Schtauffen**, Yoshimitsu
- The King of Fighters Neowave, Joe Higashi
- The King of Fighters XI, Gai Tendo
- 3rd Super Robot Wars Alpha: To the End of the Galaxy, Gai Shishioh, Muruta Azrael

2006

- Demonbane, Sandalphon
- Disgaea 2: Cursed Memories, Axel
- Growlanser: Heritage of War, Gyarick
- Last Escort, Chihiro
- Otometeki Koi Kakumei Love Revo!!, Kennosuke Tachibana

2007

- Soulcalibur Legends, **Siegfried Schtauffen**
- Star Ocean, Dorn Marto, Joshua Jerand

2008

- Cross Edge, Demitri Maximoff
- Fushigi Yûgi: Suzaku Ibun, Hikitsu
- Soulcalibur IV, **Siegfried Schtauffen**
- Super Robot Taisen OG Saga: Endless Frontier, **Haken Browning**
- Super Robot Wars A PORTABLE, Shiro Amada
- Super Robot Wars Z, Earth Federation Soldiers, Vega Soldiers
- Tatsunoko vs. Capcom, Batsu Ichimonji)

2009

- Soulcalibur: Broken Destiny, **Siegfried Schtauffen**
- The King of Fighters XII, Joe Higashi

2010

- Resonance of Fate, Pater
- Super Robot Taisen OG Saga: Endless Frontier EXCEED, **Haken Browning**
- The King of Fighters XIII, Joe Higashi

2011

- Disgaea 4: A Promise Unforgotten, Axel
- Lord of Apocalypse, Dolphstein
- 2nd Super Robot Wars Z, Viral

2012

- Bravely Default, Jackal
- Project X Zone, Demitri Maximoff, Haken Browning, Batsu Ichimonji, Stehoney
- Soulcalibur V, Siegfried Schtauffen

2013

- Final Fantasy XIV: A Realm Reborn, Marshal Pipin Tarupin

2014

- Granblue Fantasy, Seox
- J-Stars Victory Vs, Hiei
- Soulcalibur: Lost Swords, **Siegfried Schtauffen**
- 3rd Super Robot Wars Z, Viral

2015

- Bravely Second: End Layer, Jackal
- Dragon Ball Xenoverse, Time Patroller (Japanese Male Voice Option 05)
- Dragon Ball Z: Dokkan Battle, Obito Uchiha
- NET HIGH, KING
- Project X Zone 2, Demitri Maximoff, Pyron, Stehoney

2016

- Dragon Ball Xenoverse 2, Time Patroller (Japanese Male Voice Option 05)
- Summon Night 6: Lost Borders, Touya
- Super Robot Wars OG: The Moon Dwellers, Haken Browning
- UPPERS, **Michiru Sakurai**
- Yakuza 6, Kazuaki Iino

2017

- Super Mario Odyssey, Topper
- Super Robot Wars V, Maito Senpuuji

2018

- Game Tengoku CruisnMix, Homura Bantou (DLC)
- Gintama Ranbu, Pakuyasa
- Kurenai no Homura, Hachiro Chinzei
- Soulcalibur VI, **Nightmare, Siegfried Schtauffen**
- Super Robot Wars X, Maito Senpuuji, Viral
- Warriors Orochi 4, Date Masamune, Fūma Kotarō

2019

- Kill la Kill the Game: IF, Uzu Sanageyama
- Star Ocean: First Departure R, Ioshua Jerand & Dorne Murtough (SNES Remaster Version)
- Super Robot Wars T, Maito Senpuuji, Gai Shishioh
- Super Smash Bros. Ultimate, Hero (Arusu)

2020

- Nioh 2, Maeda Toshiie

2021

- Scarlet Nexus, Karen Travers

2022

- Cookie Run Kingdom, Crunchy Chip Cookie

2024

- Jujutsu Kaisen: Cursed Clash, Esō

=== Mobile and pachinko games ===
Duration	Platform	Title	Role	Developer
2010–2013	Pachinko	CR Sengoku Bushou Retsuden ~Date Masamune~	Date Masamune	Newgin
2013-	Pachinko	CR B't X	Teppei Takamiya	Takao
2014-	iOS / Android	Granblue Fantasy	SSR: Seox	Cygames
2014–2015	iOS / Android	3594e -Sangokushi Eiga-	EX/SR: Zhang Fei, EX/SR: Xiahou Dun SSR/SR: Sun Ce	Square Enix
2016-	iOS / Android	Tales of Asteria	Veigue Lungberg	Bandai Namco Games
2016/06- 2016/12/20	iOS / Android	NEW WORLD Vol. 1: Maiden of Silver Tears	SR/R+/R: Balmung	CyberConnect2
2016/06- 2021/04/27	iOS / Android	Valkyrie Anatomia: The Origin	Balgo	Square Enix
2016/06- 2018/08/31	iOS / Android	Shinobi Nightmare	Nobunaga	Fuji&Gumi Games
2016/06/15-	iOS / Android	Line: Gundam Wars	Shiro Amada	Bandai Namco, Line Corporation
2016/09-	iOS / Android	BLEACH: Brave Souls	Ikkaku Madarame	KLab Games
2016/10- 2017/08/31	iOS / Android	World Chain	Takeshi Miyamoto SSR: Guan Yu, SSR: Sun Ce, SSR: Nero	Sega
2016/11-	iOS / Android	Monster Strike	Hiei (YuYu Hakusho collaboration event)	XFLAG (subsidiary of Mixi)
2017/01-	iOS / Android	Super Robot Wars X-Ω	Gai Shishioh (The King of Braves GaoGaiGar Final event)	Sega, B.B. Studio, Bandai Namco
2017/02/28-	iOS / Android	Tales of the Rays	Veigue Lungberg	Bandai Namco Games
2017/04/12-	iOS / Android	Flame x Blaze (aka. Flame vs. Blaze, North American release)	Alagami	Square Enix
2017/04/26- 2018/01/31	iOS / Android	War of Crown (aka. Destiny of Crown) (JP Server)	Sparrow	ASONE GAMES, GAMEVIL
2017/04/27-	iOS / Android	Star Ocean: Anamnesis	Pater (Resonance of Fate collaboration event)	Square Enix
2017/06/15-	iOS / Android	Super Robot Wars X-Ω	Yuushiro Gowa (Gasaraki event)	Sega, B.B. Studio, Bandai Namco
2017/06/23-	iOS / Android	Crash Fever	Joe Higashi (The King of Fighters '98 collaboration event)	WonderPlanet Inc.
2017/08/23-	iOS / Android	Lineage II: Revolution	Theodore [NPC]	Netmarble Games
2017/09/19-	iOS / Android	Shironeko Project	Setsumusho aka. Shā Wú Shēng (Thunderbolt Fantasy collaboration event, Taiwan server only.)	COLOPL, Inc.
2017/09/30-	iOS / Android	Shironeko Project	Karlos Elgrand	COLOPL, Inc.
2017/11/28-	iOS / Android	The New Prince of Tennis: Rising Beat	Jackal Kuwahara	Bushiroad, Akatsuki
2017/12/07-	iOS / Android	Red Stone II: Adventurers of Prominence (JP Server)	Freelancer (Player character)	L&K Co.
2018/01/01-	iOS / Android	Super Robot Wars X-Ω	Forte (Bass) (Mega Man event)	Sega, B.B. Studio, Bandai Namco
2018/01/18-	iOS / Android	Shironeko Tennis	Karlos Elgrand	COLOPL, Inc.
2018/02/09- 2019/05/30	iOS / Android	Quiz Magic Academy: Lost Fantarium	Leon	Konami
2018/02/28-	iOS / Android	Mobile Suit Gundam: Sokuou Sensen	Shiro Amada	Bandai Namco
2018/03/27-	iOS / Android	Caravan Stories	Zoneli	Aiming Inc.
2018/04-	iOS / Android	Detective Conan Puzzle: Cross Chain	Makoto Kyogoku	CYBIRD
2018/08/17-	iOS / Android	Gyakuten Othellonia	Hiei (YuYu Hakusho collaboration event)	DeNA
2018/08/28-	iOS / Android	YuYu Hakusho: 100% (Serious) Real Battle	Hiei	KLab Games
2018/09/04-	iOS / Android	Fire Emblem Heroes	Jamke—Prince of Verdane	Intelligent Systems, Nintendo
2018/10/31-	iOS / Android	Icchi Banketsu -ONLINE-	Hokusai	Rejet, DMM Games
2018/12/28-	iOS / Android	Yo-kai Watch: Puni Puni	Susanoo	LEVEL-5 Inc., NHN PlayArt
2019/02/14-	iOS / Android	Dragon Quest Rivals	Zankrone	Square Enix
2019/02/14-	iOS / Android	Tokyo Afterschool Summoners	Behemoth	Lifewonders
2019/04/10-2020/10/30	iOS / Android	Detective Conan Runner: The Conductor of Truth	Makoto Kyogoku	Bushimo, Bushiroad, Ambition
2019/05/01-	iOS / Android	Yo-kai Watch: Puni Puni	Makoto Kyogoku (Weekly Shōnen Sunday collaboration event)	LEVEL-5 Inc., NHN PlayArt
2019/06/04-	iOS / Android	Monster Strike	Viral & Gueira (Promare x Tengen Toppa Gurren Lagann x Kill la Kill collaboration event)	XFLAG (subsidiary of Mixi)
2019/06/14-	iOS / Android	Shironeko Tennis	Hiei (YuYu Hakusho collaboration event)	COLOPL, Inc.
2019/07/01-	iOS / Android	Super Robot Wars X-Ω	Maito Senpuuji (The Brave Express Might Gaine x Shinkansen Henkei Robo Shinkalion event)	Sega, B.B. Studio, Bandai Namco
2019/07/16-2020/08/05 (Note: Discontinuation of real time updates, but game will continue to be playable.)	iOS / Android	Hero's Park	Kiyokazu Shirahama	Dank Hearts
2019/07/24-2020/04/27 (JP Server) 2020/06/30 (CN Server)	iOS / Android	Forever Seven Days	Night the Black Cat	NetEase, DeNA
2019/08/21-	iOS / Android	Super Robot Wars DD	Gai Shishioh	Bandai Namco
2020/03/01-	iOS / Android	Valkyrie Connect	Valtus	Ateam Inc.
2020/04/30-	iOS / Android	Grand Summoners	Hiei (YuYu Hakusho collaboration event)	Good Smile Company, NextNinja
2020/05/29- (Android) 2020/06/26- (iOS)	iOS / Android	Last Origin	CT66 Rampart	PiG, SmartJoy
2020/07/01-	iOS / Android	Langrisser Mobile	Hiei (YuYu Hakusho collaboration event)	Zlongame, extreme, Masaya Games
2020/07/16-	iOS / Android	Tales of Crestoria	Veigue Lungberg	Bandai Namco
2020/11/01-	iOS / Android	Dragon Quest Rivals Ace	Hero (Arusu)	Square Enix

=== Tokusatsu ===
1993

- Gosei Sentai Dairanger (1993), Purse Priest (ep. 2), Talking Cotpotros (ep. 2), Boss Kamikaze (eps. 15, 24, 28, 40, 47)
  - Gosei Sentai Dairanger Movie, Purse Priest/Great King Ojaru (Right Arm (Voiced of Kenichi Ishii (Duke of Card/Body Axis) Nomoto Reizo (Baron String/Torso Front), Hideaki Kusaka (Key Jester/Left Arm), Miyuki Nagato (Lipstick Songstress/Back))

1994

- Ninja Sentai Kakuranger, Ittan-momen (ep. 25)

1995

- Chouriki Sentai Ohranger, Bomber the Great (eps. 35 - 41)

1998

- Seijuu Sentai Gingaman, Gun Boss Sambash (eps. 1 - 12)

2004

- Tokusou Sentai Dekaranger, Camejiliian Ben G (ep. 13)

2005

- Mahou Sentai Magiranger: Bride of Infershia, Hades Beastman Beserker King Glúm do Bridon/Hades Beast Fusion Sword of Glúm

2007

- Kamen Rider Den-O, Wolf Imagin (ep. 17 & 18)

2008

- Engine Sentai Go-onger, Savage Land Barbaric Machine Beast Generator Banki (ep. 12)

2009

- Cho Kamen Rider Den-O & Decade Neo Generations: The Onigashima Warship, Genewt (Voice of Kōsuke Toriumi and Yoshimasa Tanno)
- Samurai Sentai Shinkenger, Ayakashi Abekonbe (ep. 27)

2011

- Kamen Rider OOO, Kuwagata Yummy (ep. 17 & 18)
- Kaizoku Sentai Gokaiger, Sneak Brother Younger (ep. 8)
- Kamen Rider Fourze, Fourze Driver, Narrator, Tachibana

2013

- Unofficial Sentai Akibaranger Season Tsu, Time Fist Demon Mutoumushite (ep. 8)

2016

- Doubutsu Sentai Zyuohger, Yabiker (ep. 8)

2017

- Ultraman Geed Ultraman King, Geed Riser Voice / Ultra Capsule Scan

2018

- Kaitou Sentai Lupinranger VS Keisatsu Sentai Patranger, Manta Bayarsh (ep. 16)

2023

- Kamen Rider Gotchard, Steamliner, Repli-Steamliner

=== Dubbing ===
Year	Title	Role
1992	Twin Peaks: Fire Walk With Me	Bobby Briggs (Dana Ashbrook)
1992	Kindergarten Cop	Danny (Tom Kurlander)
1998	Beast Wars	Rampage
1998	The Faculty	Stan Rosado (Shawn Hatosy)
1999	54	Shane O'Shea (Ryan Phillippe)
2000	Autumn in My Heart	Han Tae-seok (Won Bin)
2000	Dragonheart: A New Beginning	Mansel (Matt Hickey)
2009	Batman: The Brave and the Bold	Barry Allen/The Flash
2010	Transformers Animated	Longarm/Shockwave
2016	Pili Puppet Drama: Thunderbolt Fantasy: Tōriken yūki	Setsumusho (Shā Wú Shēng)
2016	Why Him?	Laird Mayhew (James Franco)
2020	Eurovision Song Contest: The Story of Fire Saga	Alexander Lemtov (Dan Stevens)
2020	Scoob!	Blue Falcon
2023	Strays	Rolf

=== Promotions and mascots ===
Promotion Duration	Representing Company or Project	Purpose	Promotion Format	Role/Mascot
2017/03/15-05/31	Japan Broadcasting Corporation	Channel Subscription	Website Interactive	Makoto Houdou
2018/08-	Project 758	Nagoya Pride & Tourism	Personification of Nagoya's various attraction sites into Anime characters.	Jō-Senpai (Nagoya Castle)

=== Radio shows & online video programs ===
==== Current programs ====
Duration	Program	Position	Format	Networks or Platforms	Broadcast Time	Sponsors or Tie-In Titles
2020/06/25-	Nobuyuki Hiyama & Yamaken's 'Let's Sit Down and Chat! Radio.'	Co-Host with Kenji Yamato	Online video platform	YouTube	Random upload timing.	Self Owned.
2020/08/13-	Anime: The New Prince of Tennis Official Channel	Guest (Team Rikkaidai)	Online video platform	YouTube	Monthly	The New Prince of Tennis franchise.

==== Past programs ====
Duration	Program	Position	Format	Networks	Sponsors or Tie-In Titles
1996/04/23-1997/01/03	Toshiyuki Morikawa & Nobuyuki Hiyama no Kikunowa Tadadazo!	Co-Host with Toshiyuki Morikawa	Talk Show	Radio Japan, KBS Kyoto, AM Kobe	
1998/10/04-1999/03/28	VOICE CREW (Season 4)	Co-Host with Toshiyuki Morikawa	Talk Show		
2005/11/24-2006/09/01	Tales Ring Rebirth	Host	Talk Show	Animate TV	Tales of Rebirth
2006/01	BLEACH "B" STATION	January Co-Host with Masakazu Morita	Talk Show	Radio Osaka, JOQR	BLEACH
2006/05, 2011/07	TeniPuri On The Radio	Monthly Co-Host	Talk Show	JOQR	Prince of Tennis
2006/09/28-2009/01/08	Saiungoku Monogatari: Souken no Mai (The Dance of Dual Swords)	Guest: Ep. 06, 22, 33, 34, 42, 58	Talk Show	Animate TV	The Story of Saiunkoku
2006/10/12-2008/12/25	DEATH GUN Radio	Co-Host with Toshiyuki Morikawa	Radio Drama / Talk Show	Lantis Web Radio / Radio Osaka	Ai Death Gun
2007/08/06, 2007/08/13	Onsen Toppa: Gurren Lagann RADIO	Guest: Ep. 22, 23	Talk Show	Onsen, BEWE	Gurren Lagann
2007/10/09-2008/02/05	Genchoken: Otaku na Radio	Host with Kaori Mizuhashi	Talk Show	Animate TV, Showgate RADIO, Medifac Radio	Genshiken
2013/02/28	Web Radio: Saint Seiya Ω	Guest: Ep.14	Talk Show	Animate TV	Saint Seiya Omega
2004/06/23-2020/09/23 (Final episode air date)	Nobuyuki Hiyama's Animage Hot Spring	Host	Newsmagazine / Talk Show	Onsen, BEWE	Tokuma Shoten
2017/01/07-2020/11/07	Chosoku Radio: Valkyrie->Turn	Co-host with Nozomi Yamamoto and Haruka Yoshimura	Radio Drama / Talk Show	JOQR: Super A&G+, AG-ON	Boat Race Edokawa

=== Stage performance ===
Year	Title	Role
1993~1995	YuYu Hakusho Cross–Country Concert Tour ※ Hiyama reminisced along with Nozomu Sasaki, Shigeru Chiba, and Megumi Ogata about the events within Yu Yu Hakusho's blu-ray box commentary.	Himself / Hiei
1994/08/24-28	Club Chabokko presents: A Midsummer Night's Dream	Demetrius
2004	fasti & LUSTER Concert Tour ※ Collaborated with Mitsuki Saiga's concert tour.	Himself
2005	BLEACH SOUL SONIC 2005 "Summer"	Himself / Ikkaku Madarame
2008	Tales of Festival 2008	Himself / Veigue Lungberg
2009	TeniPuriFes 2009	Himself / Jackal Kuwahara
2010	Tales of Festival 2010	Himself / Veigue Lungberg
2011	TeniPuriFes 2011 in Budokan	Himself / Jackal Kuwahara
2013	TeniPuriFes 2013	Himself / Jackal Kuwahara
2016	Super Robot Wars 25th Anniversary Celebration ※ Includes SRW's 25th Anniversary product announcement.	Himself
2016/09/11	Thunderbolt Fantasy Gratitude Event @Taipei	Himself / Shā Wú Shēng
2016/11/06	Petit Fancy 25 @Taipei Expo Park	Himself / Shā Wú Shēng
2017/12/28	Megumi Ogata Animegu. 25th Tour【Tokyo】	Guest Performance
2017/12/29~2018/01/08	Ultra Heroes EXPO 2018 Ultraman Geed Battle Stage Performance	Ultraman King (Voice)
2021/05/08-05/09	The Prince of Tennis BEST FESTA!! Ouja Rikkaidai REVENGE	Himself / Jackal Kuwahara
TBA	yucat (Yukari Katō) PARALLEL LIVE vol.17: The Plan of Dr.Code in Sanrio Puroland	Dr. Code

== Discography ==
=== Personal music albums ===
Release date	Album	Catalog number
1 June 1995	Prototype	VPCG-84250
20 December 1996	Syogyo Mujyo: All things are in flux and nothing is permanent	VPCG-84606
18 September 2003	fasti	AKCJ-80033
12 March 2008	Hi-Son: Hiyama Song	XNCG-10004

=== Character image song albums and singles ===
Release date	Title	Portrayed role	Catalog number	Note
1993/08/20	YuYu Hakusho Music Battle Hen	Hiei	MRCA-20020	Album
1993/12/16	The Brave Express Might Gaine Uta no Album	Maito Senpuuji	VICL-437	Album
1993/12/17	YuYu Hakusho Netsushou Hen ~Karaoke Battle Royale~	Hiei	MRCA-20028	Album
1994/06/08	YuYu Hakusho Meikai Shitō Hen: Honō no Kizuna ~Hiei no Shou~	Hiei	TYDY-2062	Single
1994/08/19	YuYu Hakusho Music Battle Hen 2	Hiei	MRCA-20042	Album
1994/12/16	YuYu Hakusho Music Battle Hen 3 ~Makai Densetsu~	Hiei	MRCA-20052	Album
1994/12/16	Ginga Sengoku Gun'yūden Rai Original Soundtrack Vol.2 ※ Includes character image songs	Rai Ryuga	APCM-5055	Album
1996/08/26	B't X Hikari to Kaze no Rondo 1: Kimi wo Mamoritai	Teppei Takamiya	PODX-1014	Single
1999/03/25	Initial D Vocal Battle	Takeshi Nakazato	AVCT-15000	Album
2000/01/26	Initial D Vocal Battle: Second Stage	Takeshi Nakazato	AVCA-14003	Album
2000/05/03	Infinite Ryvius Character Song Collection: Ashitakara	Airs Blue	VICL-60559	Album
2000/08/23	Fushigi Yûgi Vocal Collection: TV series Songs Complete Collection	Hikitsu	TYCY-10037/9	Album
2002/03/27	Shaman King Character Song Album	Zen (BoZ Brothers)	KICA-570	Album
2003/09/03	Tokimeki Memorial Girl's Side Clovers' Graffiti 3: Kazuma Suzuka	Kazuma Suzuka	KMCM-25	Single
2004/03/14	Tokimeki Memorial Girl's Side Image Song Collection ～Be Mine～	Kazuma Suzuka	KMCA-192	Album
2004/05/12	Prince of Tennis Best of Rival Players XVIII: Jackal Kuwahara & Bunta Marui	Jackal Kuwahara	NECM-11027	Single
2006/02/24	Mizu no Senritsu Character Song ~Futari no Another Story~ Drop IV: HUNTER	Tetsuo Katase	VGCD-0027	Single
2006/08/02	Bleach Beat Collection 2nd Session: 03	Ikkaku Madarame	SVWC-7382	Single
2006/09/20	Growlanser: Heritage of War Original Character Song Album	Gyarick	PCCG-00813	Album
2008/06/20	Houkago wa Gin no Shirabe: Mishiro Takaya Hen	Takaya Mishiro	FPBD-0064	Single
2009/01/28	Prince of Tennis Roman-Ranman	Jackal Kuwahara	NECA-10118	Single
2010/03/24	Samurai Warriors 3 Sen: Retsuka Ougi	Date Masamune	KECH-1546	Album
2011/05/25	Samurai Warriors 3Z Ten: Gouka Ougi	Date Masamune	KECH-1577/8	Album
2014/07/16	Prince of Tennis II: RIKKAI SUPER STARS	Jackal Kuwahara	NECA-33003	Album
2016/02/17	Ketteiban: YuYu Hakusho Anime Theme Song & Character Song Best Album ※ Remastered album.	Hiei	PCCK-20121	Album
2017/02/08	Matoi the Sacred Slayer Character Song Mini Album	Cariot	LACA-15632	Album
2017/08/02	Twin Angel Song Selection: Jewelry	Yuito Kisaragi	PCCR-90078	Album
2018/01/04	YuYu Hakusho 25th Anniversary Single Record Box ※ Limited Edition 7-inch Vinyl Set	Hiei	PCKA-00011	Vinyl
2020/04/29	Prince of Tennis Team Single: BesFes～Are We Cool ?～「Oujya Rikkaidai」	Jackal Kuwahara	NECM-10280	Single
2020/04/29	Prince of Tennis Character Single: LEAVE IT TO ME	Jackal Kuwahara	NECM-10282	Single
2025/12/03	Shirube 〜GRANBLUE FANTASY〜	Seox	SVWC-70738	Album

=== Drama CDs ===
※ Determined by role's first appearance within the product.

Release date	Series / Title	Role	Catalog number
1997/10/21	Weiß Kreuz Dramatic Collection I ~The Holy Children~	Jake K	MMCM-1003
1999	Initial D Drama CD - 'A Black Lightning'	Takeshi Nakazato	
2003/09/26	S.S.D.S. 〜Super Stylish Doctors Story〜 (Full Franchise)	Kiwamu Kimijima	LACA-5206
2004/12	Shueisha Drama CD: YuYu Hakusho	Hiei	SCD-905850
2005/03	Shueisha Drama CD: YuYu Hakusho 2	Hiei	SCD-909113
2005/10/21	Tales of Rebirth Drama CD series	Veigue Lungberg	FCCT-0034 (Vol.1)
2006/08/25	Fushigi Yūgi Genbu Kaiden (Volumes 4, 5, and various premium short dramas)	Hikitsu	MMCC-4102 (Vol.4)
2006/12/21	Ai Death Gun (Full 6 Volumes)	Reiji Sagimiya	LACA-5591 (Vol.1)
2015/10/28	Youkoso Seiyuu Ryohe! (Welcome to our Voice Actor Dormitory!) Room 201 ~The Dialect Actor~	Taiga Mizuno	EYC1-10564
2017/03/22	KonoSuba Season 2 OST & DramaCD Vol.3: Gospels for Days of Passion!	Wolfgang	COCX-39904

=== Collaborations ===
Release date	Song title	Medium	Artist	Role	Album	Catalog Number
2014	Walkin' Loopin' Party feat. Nobuyuki Hiyama	Music Video	EMERGENCY (NEW YOUNG, CRAZY YU, DANCING YUKARI)	Narrator and Villain		
11 October 2017	Taiyō ga Mata Kagayaku Toki feat. Nobuyuki Hiyama	Cover Song	Megumi Ogata	Duet	Animegu. 25th.	LACA-15665
