= Aniki =

Aniki (兄貴, lit. "older brother") is a nickname that may refer to:

- Billy Herrington (1969–2018), American model and pornographic film actor referred to as 'Aniki' by Japanese fans
- Ichirou Mizuki (1948–2022), Japanese musical artist
- Ryo Mizunami (born 1988), Japanese professional wrestler commonly referred to using the nickname
- Takeshi Kaneshiro (born 1973), Japanese-Taiwanese actor and singer

== See also ==
- Anikin
