= Unbalance na Kiss o Shite =

Single by Hiro Takahashi

from the album Welcome to Popsicle Channel
- Released: December 17, 1993
- Genre: J-pop
- Length: 3:50 (12" version)
- Label: Media Remoras
- Songwriters: Hiro Takahashi; Hiroshi Yamada
- Producer: Hiro Takahashi

Hiro Takahashi singles chronology
"Itsumo Jōkigen" (1993)	"Unbalance na Kiss o Shite" (1993)	"Kimi ja Nakerya Imi Ga Naine" (1994)

Unbalance na Kiss o Shite (アンバランスなKissをして / An Unbalanced Kiss) is the second single released by Japanese artist Hiro Takahashi on December 17, 1993. It peaked on the Oricon charts at No. 28 upon its initial debut, and again in 2005 at No. 187. The single had also charted in 2004 with the song "Hohoemi no Bakudan" (微笑みの爆弾 / Smile Bomb) by Matsuko Mawatari, which was written by Hsiao-Lung Lee and Matsuko Mawatari.

This song also became the third ending of the anime series YuYu Hakusho.

== Track listing ==
=== 1993 release ===
No.	Title	Lyrics	Music	Arranger(s)	Length
1.	"Unbalance na Kiss o Shite" (アンバランスなKISSをして / An Unbalanced Kiss)	Hiroshi Yamada	Hiro Takahashi • Tamiaki • Daisuke Kawai	Norihiko Hibino	3:50
2.	"Unbalance na Kiss o Shite" (Instrumental)		Hiro Takahashi • Tamiaki • Daisuke Kawai	Norihiko Hibino	3:52

=== 2005 release ===
Side 1
No.	Title	Version	Length
1.	"微笑みの爆弾" (by Mawatari)	（vocal）
2.	"アンバランスなKISSをして" (by Takahashi)	（vocal）
3.	"太陽がまた輝くとき" (by Takahashi)	（vocal）
4.	"微笑みの爆弾" (by Mawatari)	（DJ YEBISU REMIX）
5.	"アンバランスなKISSをして" (by Takahashi)	（TABATA REMIX）
6.	"微笑みの爆弾" (by Mawatari)	（inst.）
7.	"アンバランスなKISSをして" (by Takahashi)	（inst.）
8.	"太陽がまた輝くとき" (by Takahashi)	（inst.）

== Personnel ==
- Norihiko Hibino: arrangement
- Hiro Takahashi: keyboards, synthesizer, chorus
- Tamiaki: electric guitar
- Daisuke Kawai: organ, synthesizer

== Covers ==
- Eizo Japan - track #5 on album EIZO Japan 1 (2009)
- misono - covered a clip of the song in "misono to Utaou! Animedley II", track #5 from her album Cover Album (2009)
- M.O.E - track #16 on album Oretachi no Uta wo Kiku CD (2011)
- Lead - track #3 on their jacket A edition of their single Hurricane (2011). They released an alternate version of the song on their CD+COUPLING BEST version of their studio album Now or Never (2012).
- Ayabie - track #1 on album V-ANIME ROCKS evolution (2013).

== Chart positions ==
=== Charts ===
Chart (1994)	Peak position
Japanese Oricon Charts	#28

=== Year-end charts ===
Chart (1994)	Peak position
Japanese Oricon Charts	#94
