= Megumi Ogata =

Japanese voice actress (born 1965)

- 緒方 恵美
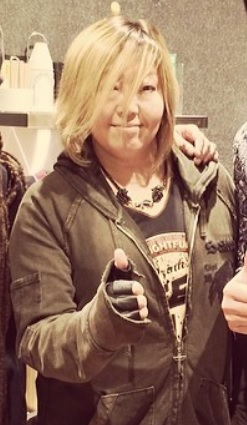
- Ogata in 2014
- Born: June 6, 1965 (age 61); Chiyoda, Tokyo, Japan
- Other name: em:óu
- Education: Tokai University
- Occupations: Actress; voice actress; singer
- Years active: 1992–present
- Agent: Breathe Arts
- Height: 170 cm (5 ft 7 in)
- Website: www.emou.net

Megumi Ogata (緒方 恵美, Ogata Megumi; born June 6, 1965) is a Japanese actress and singer from the Greater Tokyo Area. As a singer, she goes by the name em:óu. She is best known for voicing Shinji Ikari in Neon Genesis Evangelion, Yugi Mutou and Dark Yugi in the Toei version of Yu-Gi-Oh!, Makoto Naegi and Nagito Komaeda in the Danganronpa series, Ken Amada in Persona 3, Kurama in YuYu Hakusho, Sailor Uranus in the Sailor Moon series, Yuta Okkotsu in Jujutsu Kaisen, Hanako and Tsukasa in Toilet-Bound Hanako-kun and Yukito Tsukishiro/Yue in Cardcaptor Sakura.

Due to her notability for playing male roles and boyish female roles, Ogata is sometimes referred to with the nickname aniki.

== Early life ==
Ogata was born into a musical family and was given singing lessons from a young age.

Ogata attended Tokai University, studying oceanography but later dropped out due to her lack of interest. Following this, she attended the Tokyo Seisen Music School, taking a musical theater course.

After graduation, Ogata began working as a musical actress, attending the same classes alongside Rumi Kasahara and Shiho Niiyama in the Neverland Musical Community troupe. While working in musical theater, Ogata developed a reputation for playing male roles.

Following the disbandment of the troupe, Ogata decided to pursue voice acting as a career. Also around this time, Ogata broke her hip, which influenced her decision to leave musical theater. Due to her reputation of playing male roles, it was suggested she try to do the same in voice acting.

== Career ==
Ogata began attending a cram school associated with Aoni Production following her decision to become a voice actor. Following her graduation from the school, she debuted with the role of Kurama in YuYu Hakusho. Early in Ogata's career, she was affiliated with Aoni Production.

Ogata left Aoni Productions in 1998. In 2000, she had planned to take a hiatus from voice acting. However, due to a family emergency in which she had to pay off significant amounts of debt, she returned to voice acting soon after.

Ogata initially pursued a musical career singing idol-like music. After switching labels to Lantis in 1999, Ogata began pursuing different kinds of music. Due to Ogata's status as a popular voice actor, she was given freedom at Lantis to make music suited to her own taste.

In 2015, Ogata mentioned that the screaming she often does for roles has had negative effects on her health, including voice strain and headaches.

In 2021, Ogata contracted COVID-19, requiring her to pause her active recordings to recover. That same year, she published her autobiography.

== Personal life ==
While attending Aoni Production's cram school, Ogata's father started suffering from a heart condition. To ensure that her father would see her as a bride before he died, Ogata married her then-boyfriend. Following her debut as a voice actor, she had less time to spend with her family, which strained her relationship with her husband. Six months after debuting as a voice actor, Ogata and her husband ended their relationship in divorce.

Ogata married for a second time in 2004. Ogata has chosen to remain private about this second relationship.

In 2022, speaking at the Seiyu Awards after winning the Best Lead Actress Award, Ogata spoke about her stance on gender and self-identity. She called for the Seiyu Awards to abolish gendered categories. She also said, "I have never really thought of myself as actress, per se. These days, we live in what's called a gender-free society, and in the world there are people who have come out [as LGBTQ+]. There are also many people, like me, who hardly think of themselves as 'women' at all as they live their daily lives." For this reason, she considered turning down the Best Lead Actress Award. However, she decided to accept it, believing that being given the platform to speak on the issue was more important.

== Filmography ==
=== Anime ===
Year	Title	Role(s)	Ref.
1992	YuYu Hakusho	Minamino Shūichi, Masaru's Mother, Kurama	
1993	Ghost Sweeper Mikami	Yokoshima's mother, high-leg ghost, Headmaster (young), others	
1993	Dragon Ball Z	Grandma	
1993	Jungle King Tar-chan	Cima Marceau	
1993	Slam Dunk	Takenori Akagi (young)	
1993–97	Pretty Soldier Sailor Moon	Haruka Tenoh/Sailor Uranus, Vampire, Seirēn, Petz	
1994	Captain Tsubasa J	Jun Misugi (young)	
1994	Magic Knight Rayearth	Emeraude, Eagle Vision	
1994	Yamato Takeru	Roka	
1994	Doraemon	Naoko, Boy	
1994	Ginga Sengoku Gun'yūden Rai	Hiryu	
1995	Neon Genesis Evangelion	Shinji Ikari	
1995	Sorcerer Hunters	Mille Feuille	
1995	Zenki	Anju, Akira Gouki	
1996	Detective Conan	Ayako Nagai	
1996	B't X	Karen	
1996	Alice in Cyberland	Charlie	
1996	Violinist of Hameln	Sizer	
1997	Virus Buster Serge	Leon	
1997	Vampire Princess Miyu	Reiha, Matsukaze	
1997	Clamp School Detectives	Hikaru Kisaragi	
1998	Cardcaptor Sakura	Yukito Tsukishiro, Yue	
1998	Devilman Lady	Aoi Kurosaki	
1998	Android Announcer Maico 2010	Ryoko Masudamasu	
1998	Flame of Recca	Aki	
1998	Yu-Gi-Oh!	Yugi Mutou	
1999	Jibaku-kun (Bucky)	Dead	
1999	Gokudo the Adventurer	Miroku	
1999	Great Teacher Onizuka	Juria Murai	
1999	Hoshin Engi	Fugen Shinjin	
1999	Neo Ranga	Myō Ōmori	
1999	Karakurizōshi Ayatsuri Sakon	Sakon Tachibana	
1999	Power Stone	WangTang	
2000	Ghost Stories	Akane of the Broadcast Room	
2001	Hiwou War Chronicles	Arisaka	
2001	Project ARMS	Al Bowen	
2002	Full Moon o Sagashite	Izumi Lio	
2002	GetBackers	Clayman	
2002	Hanada Shōnen Shi	Hitomi	
2002	Samurai Deeper Kyo	Sanada Yukimura, Anayama Kosuke	
2002	Tokyo Mew Mew	Masaya Aoyama, the Blue Knight, Deep Blue	
2002	UFO Ultramaiden Valkyrie	Valkyrie, Valkyrie Ghost	
2003	Detective School Q	Kyū Renjō	
2004	Black Jack	Keaton	
2005	Elemental Gelade	Rasati Tigres	
2006	Angel Heart	Yáng Fāng-Yù	
2006	Black Jack 21	various minor roles	
2006	Majime ni Fumajime Kaiketsu Zorori	Prince	
2007	Kyoshiro to Towa no Sora	Waruteishia	
2007	Bleach	Tier Harribel	
2008	S · A: Special A	Satoru Takishima	
2010	Angel Beats!	Ayato Naoi	
2010	Super Robot Wars Original Generation: The Inspector	Lin Mao	
2011	Nichijou	String of flags at episode 13	
2011	Tamayura ~Hitotose~	Fu's mother	
2012	Koi to Senkyo to Chocolate	Oboro Yumeshima	
2012	Medaka Box Abnormal	Kumagawa Misogi	
2013	Danganronpa: The Animation	Makoto Naegi	
2013	Devil Survivor 2: The Animation	Child Yamato Hotsuin	
2014	Chaika - The Coffin Princess	Ricardo Gavarni	
2014	Hamatora: The Animation	Momoka	
2014	Tokyo ESP	Ayumu Oozora	
2015–16	Assassination Classroom	Itona Horibe	
2016	Aokana: Four Rhythm Across the Blue	Aoi Kagami	
2016	Divine Gate	Narrator	
2016	Danganronpa 3: The End of Hope's Peak High School	Makoto Naegi, Nagito Komaeda	
2016	Magical Girl Raising Project	Musician of the Forest, Cranberry	
2016	Regalia: The Three Sacred Stars	Johann	
2017	Konohana Kitan	Tsubasa, Okami	
2017	Kino's Journey -the Beautiful World- the Animated Series	Sou	
2018	Cardcaptor Sakura: Clear Card	Yukito Tsukishiro, Yue	
2018	Hakumei and Mikochi	Kobone Master	
2018	Magical Girl Ore	Ichigou Fujimoto	
2018	Shinkansen Henkei Robo Shinkalion	Shinji Ikari	
2019	Kengan Ashura	Ryo Inaba	
2019	Phantasy Star Online 2: Episode Oracle	Xion	
2020	Toilet-Bound Hanako-kun	Hanako, Tsukasa	
2020	Akudama Drive	Doctor	
2021	High-Rise Invasion	Shinji Okihara	
2021	The Idaten Deities Know Only Peace	Ysley	
2022	Kaginado Season 2	Ayato Naoi	
2023	KamiKatsu	Clen, Loki	
2023	Jujutsu Kaisen	Yuta Okkotsu	
2024	Shy	Muku Shintō	
2024	Blue Miburo	Kikuchiyo / Tokugawa Iemochi	
2025	Ishura Season 2	Hiroto the Paradox	
2025	Tougen Anki	Principal	
2026	Tank Chair	Sensei	
2027	The Reincarnated Elf Left on a Journey to Master His Magic	Sylpha	

=== OVA ===
Year	Title	Role(s)	Ref.
1993	Ah My Goddess	Keiichi Morisato (child)	
1994	Eizou Hakusho	Kurama	
1995	Armitage III	Julian Moore	
1995	Miyuki-chan in Wonderland	Fuyuri, To Li	
1995	Eizou Hakusho II	Kurama	
1995	Kodomo no Omocha	Akito Hayama	
1995	Glass Mask	Maya Kitajima	
1995	Sorcerer Hunters	Mille feuille	
1995	UFO Princess Valkyrie: SPECIAL – Bridal Training	Valkyrie	
1995	Landlock	Agahari	
1996	Apocalypse Zero	Harara Hagakure	
1997	Rayearth	Emeraude	
1999	Melty Lancer: The Animation	Melvina MacGarlen	
2011	Fate/Prototype	Rider's Master	
2012	One Off	Kageyama	
2017	Super Danganronpa 2.5: Komaeda Nagito to Sekai no Hakaisha	Nagito Komaeda, Makoto Naegi	

=== Anime films ===
Year	Title	Role(s)	Ref.
1993	Yu Yu Hakusho: The Movie	Kurama	
1993	Pretty Soldier Sailor Moon R: The Movie	Young Mamoru	
1994	Yu Yu Hakusho: Chapter of Underworld's Carnage – Bonds of Fire	Kurama	
1994	Pretty Soldier Sailor Moon S The Movie	Haruka Tenoh	
1995	Pretty Soldier Sailor Moon Super S: The Nine Sailor Soldiers Unite! Miracle of the Black Dream Hole	Haruka Tenoh	
1997	Neon Genesis Evangelion: Death & Rebirth	Shinji Ikari	
1997	The End of Evangelion	Shinji Ikari	
1999	Yu-Gi-Oh!	Yugi Mutou, Dark Yugi	
1999	Cardcaptor Sakura: The Movie	Yukito Tsukishiro	
2000	Cardcaptor Sakura Movie 2: The Sealed Card	Yue/Yukito Tsukishiro	
2002	Case Closed: The Phantom of Baker Street	Hideki Moroboshi, Noaz Ark	
2005	Black Jack: The Two Doctors of Darkness	Brother	
2007	Evangelion: 1.0 You Are (Not) Alone	Shinji Ikari	
2009	Evangelion: 2.0 You Can (Not) Advance	Shinji Ikari	
2012	Evangelion: 3.0 You Can (Not) Redo	Shinji Ikari	
2014	Persona 3 The Movie: No. 2, Midsummer Knight's Dream	Ken Amada	
2015	Persona 3 The Movie: No. 3, Falling Down	Ken Amada	
2021	Evangelion: 3.0+1.0 Thrice Upon a Time	Shinji Ikari	
2021	Jujutsu Kaisen 0	Yuta Okkotsu	
2023	Digimon Adventure 02: The Beginning	Rui Ōwada	

=== Video games ===
Year	Title	Role(s)	Ref.
1994	Twin Goddesses	Carmila	
1995	Pretty Soldier Sailor Moon: Another Story	Sailor Uranus	
1995	Battle Tycoon: Flash Hiders SFX	Pachet Vain	
1995	Magic Knight Rayearth	Emeraude	
1995	Battle Arena Toshinden 2	Officer Tracy	
1996	The Legend of Valkyrie Gaiden: The Adventure of Rosa	Michelle	
1996	Meltylancer: Ginga Shoujo Keisatsu 2086	Melvina MacGarlen	
1996	Last Bronx	Yoko Kono	
1996	Star Gladiator	June Lin Milliam	
1996	Plasma Sword	June Lin Milliam	
1996-2003	True Love Story	Shinobu Kusanagi	
1997	Neon Genesis Evangelion: Girlfriend of Steel	Shinji Ikari	
1997	Tengai Makyō: Daiyon no Mokushiroku	Seiya	
1997	Meltylancer Re-inforce	Melvina MacGarlen	
1997-2017	Super Robot Wars series	Ring Mao, Shinji Ikari	
1998	Twinbee RPG	Seeds	
1998	Street Fighter EX2	Nanase	
1999	Meltylancer: The 3rd Planet	Melvina MacGarlen	
2000	Street Fighter EX3	Sharon	
2002	Xenosaga Episode I: Der Wille zur Macht	Luvedo	
2002	Mega Man Zero	Harpuia	
2003	Mega Man Zero 2	Harpuia	
2004	Toshinden 2X PP	Tracy	
2004	Mega Man Zero 3	Harpuia	
2005	Neon Genesis Evangelion: Girlfriend of Steel 2nd	Shinji Ikari	
2006	Mega Man ZX	Biometal Model H	
2006	Persona 3	Ken Amada	
2007	Super Robot Wars: Original Generations	Ring Mao	
2008	Tales of Vesperia	Ioder / Yodel	
2009	Maji de Watashi ni Koishinasai!	Cookie-1	
2010	Koi to Senkyo to Chocolate	Oboro Yumeshima	
2010	Danganronpa: Trigger Happy Havoc	Makoto Naegi	
2012	Dengeki Stryker	Colonel Mirror	
2012	Danganronpa 2: Goodbye Despair	Nagito Komaeda, Makoto Naegi	
2012	Phantasy Star Online 2	Xion and Xiao	
2013	Persona 4 Arena Ultimax	Ken Amada	
2014	Princess Nightmare	Phantom	
2014	Granblue Fantasy	Grimnir	
2014	Persona Q: Shadow of the Labyrinth	Ken Amada	
2014	Danganronpa Another Episode: Ultra Despair Girls	Nagito Komaeda, Makoto Naegi	
2014	Aokana: Four Rhythm Across the Blue	Aoi Kagami	
2017	Danganronpa V3: Killing Harmony	Nagito Komaeda, Makoto Naegi	
2018	Fighting EX Layer	Sanane	
2020	World's End Club	Pochi	
2021	Famicom Detective Club: The Missing Heir	Protagonist	
2021	Famicom Detective Club: The Girl Who Stands Behind	Protagonist	
2022	Live a Live	Pogo	
2022	Honkai Impact 3rd	Otto Apocalypse [Young]	
2023	Granblue Fantasy Versus: Rising	Grimnir	
2024	Jujutsu Kaisen: Cursed Clash	Yuta Okkotsu	
2024	Persona 3 Reload	Ken Amada	
2024	Emio - The Smiling Man: Famicom Detective Club	Protagonist	
2024	Metaphor: ReFantazio	Fidelio Aureus Magnus	
2025	The Hundred Line: Last Defense Academy	Ima Tsukumo	

=== Tokusatsu ===
Year	Title	Role(s)	Ref.
1993	Gridman the Hyper Agent	Mateibea (Voice)	
2021	Mashin Sentai Kiramager the Movie: Be-Bop Dream	Dream Stone (Voice)	

=== Other live-action ===
Year	Title	Role(s)	Ref.
2022	Teen Regime	AI (Voice)	
2024	Saint Young Men: The Movie	Futon (Voice)	

=== Dubbing ===
==== Live-action ====
Year	Title	Role(s)	Ref.
1995	Hackers	Kate "Acid Burn" Libby	
2019	Shazam!	Billy Batson	
2023	Shazam! Fury of the Gods	Billy Batson	

==== Animation ====
Year	Title	Role(s)	Ref.
2026	Hoppers	Fish Queen	

== Others ==
=== DRAMA CD ===
- 「Yuu ☆ Yuu ☆ Hakusho」Series 「幽☆遊☆白書シリーズ」 (Zou-Ba)
- Rurouni Kenshin 〜 Meiji Kenkaku Roman Tan 「るろうに剣心〜明治剣客浪漫譚」 (Himura Kenshin)
- Tenba No Ketsuzoku 「天馬の血族」 (Aruto Jin)
- Time Leap 「タイム・リープ」 (Wakamatsu Kazuhiko)
- Hana No Asuka Gumi Gaiden 「花のあすか組！ 外伝」 (Kuraku Asuka)
- 「Dear」Series 「Dearシリーズ」 (Kisaki Sumeragi)
- Toki No Daichi 「刻の大地」 (Jendo)
- Tentai Gikai 「天体議会」 (Mizu Hasu)
- Shōnen Shinka-Ron 「少年進化論」 (Fujisaki Sana)
- Fushigi Yuugi 〜 Genbu Kaiden 「ふしぎ遊戯〜玄武開伝」 (Shitsu yado)
- Kaze No Oukoku 「風の王国」 (Ri Suiran)
- Gakuen Kaku Meiden Mitsurugi 「学園革命伝ミツルギ」 (Mitsurugi Chiruchiru)
- Ray Sweeper 「レイスイーパー」 (Ken Shin)
- Shiritsu Kurearu Gakuen 「私立クレアール学園」 (Hyōdō Takaiku)
- Ginga Tetsudou No Yoru 「銀河鉄道の夜」 (Tadashi)
- 「Shuuen No Shiori」 Series 「終焉ノ栞」シリーズ」 (A-ya)
- Ima, Ai Ni Yukimasu 「いま、会いにゆきます」 (Aio Yuuji)
- Radical Hospital 「ラディカル・ホスピタル」 (Yonezawa Amerika)
- Love Cuisine 〜 Monster Recipe 〜 「Love Cuisine〜モンスターズ・レシピ〜」 (Rubinou & Koruri)
- Grand Stage 「グラン・ステージ」 (Akihiro Akito)
- Fate/Prototype: Fragments of Sky Silver 「フェイト/プロトタイプ 蒼銀のフラグメンツ」(Moses)

=== Broadcast radio ===
- Ogata Megumi no MUSIC COAST
- Ogata Megumi no Ginga ni Hoero! (1996–1998)
- Ogata Megumi no Ai daze!BABY!
- Kyou wa Ichinichi Anison Zanmai S.S.

=== Internet radio show ===
- Ogata Megumi no Himitsu no Ha・Na・Zo・N
- Ogata vs Domon MOEMOEWoo!toko-gumi! (M.O.Bay)
- Bara Iro Tengoku (M.O.Bay)
- Megumi Ogata's Yell ROCK

=== Personal show ===
- Love Letter
- Ogata Megumi no Tsuki no Yoru ni Ai ma Show

=== Full CDs ===
- Half Moon (March 16, 1994)
- Marine Legend (April 21, 1995)
- Winter Bird (December 13, 1995)
- Multipheno (October 28, 1996)
- Santa Claus ni Naritai (November 11, 1996)
- Megumi Ogata Live: Multipheno Concert Tour 1996 Winter Concert (March 5, 1997)
- MO (em:óu) (March 11, 1998)
- Megumi Ogata Live: [em:óu] Concert Tour 1998 ((in Tokio to Hong Kong)) (March 13, 1999)
- Best "Runner" (June 30, 1999)
- Rain (2001/01/10)
- Aitai. ~passed and next 1992–2002~ (2002/12/04)
- STOP, AND GO (2003/07/02)
- Kagami no kuni no alice (2004/10/22)
- Yoake no Jikan (2006/07/05)
- Animegu (2007/10/03)
- LiveCD「Christmas Rose2007～acoustic live」 (2008/04/08)
- 666:rock・lock・ROCK! (2008/12/24)
- Desire - Kibou (2013/11/23)
- real / dummy (2017/2/1)
- Animegu. 25th (2017/10/11)
- Early Ogata Best (2018/5/30)
- Gekiraku -Dramatic Medicine- (2021/4/21)

=== Singles ===
- Tenki Ame ga Futta Hi (January 21, 1996)
- Kaze no Bohyou (May 25, 1996)
- Kizutsukanai ai wa iranai (July 10, 1996)
- Wine Red no Kokoro (October 7, 1996)
- Time Leap (May 25, 1997)
- Jealousy no aza (December 17, 1997)
- Vacation map (February 11, 1998)
- Rasen (November 18, 1998)
- Hikari Wo Sagashite
- Run
- Silver Rain (July 1, 1999)
- Animal Eyes (August 22, 1999)
- Ouchi wo Tsukuro (2001/12/29)
- Kuchen backen und dabeinnocent Prisoner (2013/2/10)
- Kuchen backen und dabe (2013/2/10)
- Innocent prisoner (2013/2/10)
- Kodoku no Kakurenbo (September 23, 2015)

== Awards ==
Year	Award	Category	Result
1994	17th Anime Grand Prix	Voice actor of the Year	Won
2022	16th Seiyu Awards	Best Lead Actress Award	Won
