= Hiro Takahashi =

Hiro Takahashi 高橋ひろ
- Born: Hiroyuki Takahashi (高橋裕幸); August 10, 1964
- Origin: Tokyo, Japan
- Died: November 4, 2005 (aged 41)
- Genres: Pop
- Occupation: Singer–songwriter
- Instruments: Vocals, guitar, piano
- Years active: 1984–2005

Hiro Takahashi (高橋 ひろ, Takahashi Hiro; August 10, 1964 – November 4, 2005), born as Hiroyuki Takahashi (高橋 裕幸, Takahashi Hiroyuki), was a Japanese singer, lyricist, and composer.

== Biography ==
On the music program Hey! Hey! Hey! Music Champ, he mentioned he composed two songs at the age of 11 – Heart of a Woman and Northern Town.

In 1984, Takahashi started his work entering the band Popsicle. In 1987, he joined the band Tulip, beginning a more professional musical career. He played a major role in the band's development, writing some of its hit singles.

In 1989, after the breakup of Tulip (reunited in 1997), he rejoined Popsicle temporarily.

When his recording label shut down, he became more active as a composer. He composed numerous soundtracks for anime, stage, television, and radio. His music for Nippon Hōsō Show Up Nighter was used from 2005 until 2008.

He died on November 4, 2005, at the age of 41, due to multiple organ failure resulting from a retroperitoneal sarcoma.

== Discography ==
=== Albums ===
- Kimi ja Nakerya Iminaine (君じゃなけりゃ意味ないね) (November 19, 1993)
- Welcome To Popsicle Channel (November 18, 1994)
- New Horizon (November 17, 1995)
- Great Big Kiss (November 11, 2000)
- From Future Present (February/March, 2007)
- Takahashi Hiro Best Collection (March 15, 2010 – PCCS.00091)

=== Singles ===
- Itsumo Jōkigen (いつも上機嫌) (November 19, 1993)
- Unbalance na Kiss o Shite (アンバランスなKissをして) (December 17, 1993)
- Kimi ja Nakerya Imi ga Naine (君じゃなけりゃ意味がないね) (February 18, 1994)
- Taiyō ga Mata Kagayaku Toki (太陽がまた輝くとき) (June 17, 1994)
- Kuchibiru ga Hodokenai (くちびるがほどけない) (June 21, 1995)
- Shiawase no Pilot (しあわせのパイロット) (November 1, 1995)
- Soda Fountain (October 1, 1998)
- Nazenani Kimi no Daizukan (なぜなに君の大図鑑) (March 23, 2002)
- Karei Naru One Step (華麗なるone step) (September 16, 2002)
- Hohoemi no Bakudan (微笑みの爆弾) (singer: Matsuko Mawatari)/Unbalance na Kiss o shite/Taiyō Ga Mata Kagayaku Toki (June 1, 2005) – Re-recorded version
