= Taiyō ga Mata Kagayaku Toki =

Single by Hiro Takahashi
- Released: June 17, 1994
- Length: 5:18
- Label: Media Remoras
- Songwriter(s): Hiro Takahashi, Megumi Ogura
- Producer(s): Hiro Takahashi

Hiro Takahashi singles chronology
"Kimi ja Nakerya Imi Ga Naine" (1994)	"Taiyō ga Mata Kagayaku Toki" (1994)	"Kuchibiru Ga Hodokenai" (1994)

"Taiyō ga Mata Kagayaku Toki" (太陽がまた輝くとき; lit. When the sun shines again) is a 1994 song recorded by Japanese singer Hiro Takahashi. The song comes from his second album called Welcome to Popsicle Channel. It reached number 9 on the Japanese charts.

B-side is "Lunchtime Goodbye" (ランチタイム グッドバイ, Ranchitaimu guddobai) and an instrumental version of the titular song.

This song also became the fourth ending of the anime series YuYu Hakusho.

== Track listing ==
=== 1994 release ===
Side 1
No.	Title	Version	Length
1.	"Taiyō ga Mata Kagayaku Toki (太陽がまた輝くとき)"	（vocal）	5:18
2.	"Lunchtime Goodbye (ランチタイム グッドバイ)"	（vocal）	N/A
3.	"Taiyō ga Mata Kagayaku Toki (太陽がまた輝くとき)"	（inst.）	N/A

== Personnel ==
- Hiro Takahashi (高橋ひろ, Takahashi Hiro): piano, vocals, synthesizer
- Miaki Harada (原田未秋, Harada Miaki): electric guitar
- Hiroyuki Namba (難波弘之, Namba Hiroyuki): organ, synthesizer
- Makoto Saito (斉藤誠, Saito Makoto): electric guitar
- Nobuo Yagi (八木信夫, Yagi Nebuo): harmonica

== Chart positions ==
=== Charts ===
Chart (1994)	Peak position
Japanese Oricon Charts	#9

=== Year-end charts ===
Chart (1994)	Peak position
Japanese Oricon Charts	#90
