= Matsuko Mawatari =

Japanese pop singer-songwriter (born 1967)

Matsuko Mawatari 馬渡 松子
- Born: December 17, 1967 (age 58); Mimata, Miyazaki, Japan
- Genres: J-pop
- Occupation: Singer-songwriter
- Instruments: Vocals, keyboard
- Years active: 1992–1997; 2005–present
- Label: Lucky Lips

Matsuko Mawatari (馬渡 松子, Mawatari Matsuko; born December 17, 1967) is a Japanese pop singer-songwriter.

== Life and works ==
She is known for having written "Hohoemi no Bakudan" (Smile Bomb), which is the opening theme for the YuYu Hakusho anime series. She also sang a few ending themes from the same anime, such as "Sayonara Bye Bye", "Homework ga Owaranai", and "Daydream Generation".

In the early 1990s, Mawatari Matsuko opened for the band Dreams Come True for their tour. She has also released five studio albums, four from Anime record label Remoras, and one from her own label, Pit'A'Pat. According to her website, she has retired from the music business. However, in 2012, it has been released a new album named KiseKi with the songs 1. PC Dakegashitteiru; 2. Precious; 3. Netsu; 4. Middle Voice; 5. Kokorokoujou; 6. Time On Time; 7. B Gata; 8. Only Place; 9. Let Me Return Again; 10. AIR.

== Discography ==
=== Singles ===
1. Kimi wa ima shinzō-yaburi (君は今心臓破り) (Released May 21, 1992)
2. Hohoemi no Bakudan (微笑みの爆弾) (Released November 6, 1992)
3. P-U (Released March 19, 1993)
4. 基-motoi- (Released November 19, 1993)
5. Mr. Pressure (Mr.プレッシャー) (Release April 21, 1994)
6. Daydream Generation (デイドリームジェネレーション) (Released October 21, 1994)
7. Kaeritai (帰りたい) (Released March 17, 1995)
8. Passion in Energy (Released April 10, 2018)

=== Studio albums ===
- Aitashi Gakunari Gatashi (Released June 19, 1992)
1. Aitashi Gakunari Gatashi
2. Kimi wa Shinzo Yaburi
3. Fortuneteller
4. Tsuitekanai
5. Piripiri
6. Summer Dust
7. +, -, 0 (Plus, Minus, Zero)
8. Otoko Tomodachi
9. Engeru no Keisuu no Yoru
10. Homework ga Owaranai
- Nice Unbalance (Released April 21, 1993)
1. Nice Unbalance
2. Shiran Kao
3. Sayonara Bye-bye
4. Aimai na Kisetsu
5. P-U (Puuturou Mix)
6. Forgive me, my kah-chan
7. Glassica
8. Uso ga Kirai na Toki
9. Warui Mushi
10. Hohoemi no Bakudan
11. Rashiku mo Nai ne
- Amachan (Released May 20, 1994)
1. Amachan
2. Mr. Pressure (Remix)
3. Monkey Bites (Drivin' Version)
4. Majime ni Naru
5. Free
6. Ai o Semanaide
7. Ruisen no Kanata Kara
8. Motoi -motoi-
9. Zip
10. Kanashii Otona
11. Anata o Aishite Yamazu
12. Kokoro no Mama ni
- Barabushuka (Released April 21, 1995)
1. Woman Woman
2. Mudai
3. Sanzan na Koi o Shite mo
4. Hoshi no Kazu
5. Premonition
6. Birthday ga Noshikakaru
7. Daydream Generation
8. Penalty
9. Kaeritai (Remix)
10. Amachan (Omake special)
- Pops (Released March 20, 1997, and re-issued on December 17, 2005)
1. Clean on the Smile
2. Kagiri Aru Nichijo
3. P-U (time limit version)
4. Kaze no Katachi
5. Science of Love
6. Let's Be Human
7. Forest
- (Tracks included on re-release Pops+)
1. Shikyo ni Aishiteiru
2. Who
3. Beeswax
- Break a Theory: Enishi (Released November 2, 2016)
1. Punk
2. What made you do?
3. free life
4. Mirai no seed
5. Risk
6. Chain
7. Hikari no Mae ni
8. Turquiose
9. Ashita e no Yoin
10. Smooth

=== Other Album ===
- Shinrabanso (森羅万象) (Released October 22, 2001, in original instrumental collection)
- re:Birth (Released June 25, 2008, in Best Album Acoustic Version)
- KiseKi (Released May 4, 2012, COOLWIND LABEL first album)
- Smile Power Instrumental M:Edition (SMILE☆POWER インストゥルメンタル M:Edition) (Released December 6, 2013)
- Necktie on the beat (ネクタイ on the beat) (Released November 2, 2016, in mini-album as Matsuko Mawatari with Kurobuchi Brothers)

=== Best album ===
1. The Best of Mawatari Matsuko (Released November 20, 2013)
