= List of Saiyuki volumes =

List of volumes of the Saiyuki manga series

Cover of the first tankōbon volume of Saiyuki, released in Japan by Enix on September 1, 1997

The Saiyuki manga series is written and illustrated by Kazuya Minekura. The original Saiyuki manga was serialized in Enix's Monthly GFantasy from 1997 to 2002 and was collected into nine tankōbon volumes. Ichijinsha subsequently reprinted the nine volumes between October 26, 2002, and June 25, 2003.

In 2015, Ichijinsha published a five-volume bunkoban edition of the original nine-volume manga.

The first English-language edition was licensed by Tokyopop, which published all nine volumes between March 2, 2004, and July 12, 2005.

Madman Entertainment subsequently published all nine volumes in Australia between October 3, 2007, and October 9, 2008.

Beginning in 2020, Kodansha published a new English-language edition of Saiyuki in four large-format hardcover volumes with new translations. The edition was completed in January 2021.

The subsequent manga series Saiyuki Gaiden, Saiyuki Reload, Saiyuki Ibun, and Saiyuki Reload Blast are listed separately below.

== Saiyuki Gaiden ==
Saiyuki Gaiden is a prequel series set approximately 500 years before the main story. It began serialization in Monthly GFantasy in 1999 and was later transferred to Ichijinsha's Comic Zero Sum WARD. The series concluded in May 2009 and was collected into four volumes.

The fourth and final volume was released on July 25, 2009.

== Saiyuki Reload ==
Saiyuki Reload is the sequel to the original Saiyuki series. It was serialized in Monthly Comic Zero Sum from 2002 to 2009 and was collected into ten Japanese volumes. Tokyopop published nine English-language volumes in North America.

== Saiyuki Ibun ==
Saiyuki Ibun is a prequel series focusing on the youth of Koumyo Sanzo. It began serialization in 2009 and received its first collected volume on April 25, 2013.

The series went on hiatus after its first collected volume.

== Saiyuki Reload Blast ==
Saiyuki Reload Blast began serialization in Monthly Comic Zero Sum in 2009. The manga resumed in March 2012 after a hiatus.

Ichijinsha describes Saiyuki Reload Blast as the final chapter of the main Saiyuki series.

== Volume list ==
=== Saiyuki (Enix Edition) ===
No.	Original release date	Original ISBN	English release date	English ISBN
1	September 1, 1997	978-4-87025-592-0	March 1, 2004	978-1-59182-651-4
0. "Prologue: Go To the West"; 1. "First Game"; 2. "Even"; 3. "Get Square"; 4. "His God"; 5. "My God"
2	March 1, 1998	978-4-87025-287-5	May 11, 2004	978-1-59182-652-1
6. "Cleaning Beauty"; 7. "Crimson"; 8. "Drug and Booze"; 9. "Charismatic"; 10. "Rain"; 11. "Shower of Bullets"
3	October 1, 1998	978-4-87025-406-0	July 13, 2004	978-1-59182-653-8
12. "Metamorphose"; 13. "Faith In Mind"; 14. "Good Night"; 15. "Drop A Bomb"; 16. "Confront"; 17. "Overlap Each Other"
4	March 1, 1999	978-4-87025-488-6	September 14, 2004	978-1-59182-654-5
18. "Tragedy in Revenge"; 19. "Misty"; 20. "Wandering Destiny"; 21. "Dead"; 22. "Alive"; 23. "Survive"
5	September 1, 1999	978-4-75750-096-9	November 9, 2004	978-1-59182-655-2
24. "Be There 1"; 25. "Be There 2"; 26. "Be There 3"; 27. "Be There 4"; 28. "Sandstorm"; 29. "A Fatal Dose"
6	March 1, 2000	978-4-75750-219-2	January 30, 2005	978-1-59532-431-3
30. "Selfish"; 31. "Pride"; 32. "Thicker Than Blood"; 33. "Devastation"; 34. "Always"; 35. "Opposite"; 36. "Wish"
7	October 1, 2000	978-4-75750-318-2	March 8, 2005	978-1-59532-432-0
37. "Out of Gear"; 38. "Branches"; 39. "Critical Day"; 40. "Blind Faith"; 41. "Farewell"; 42. "10 Years Ago"
8	July 1, 2001	978-4-75750-502-5	June 7, 2005	978-1-59532-433-7
43. "Be Lacking"; 44. "Rabbits"; 45. "Chase"; 46. "Don't Cry"; 47. "Recreation"; 48. "Lose"; 49. "Take To Flight"
Edition Details
9	February 1, 2002	978-4-75750-634-3	July 12, 2005	978-1-59532-434-4
50. "Play Go"; 51. "Dawn"; 52. "Go Ahead"; 53. "Bet"; 54. "Nothing To Give"; 55. "Falling, Rising"
Edition Details

=== Saiyuki (Ichijinsha Edition) ===
No.	Release date	ISBN
1	October 26, 2002	978-4-75805-007-4
2	November 26, 2002	978-4-75805-008-1
3	December 26, 2002	978-4-75805-012-8
4	January 27, 2003	978-4-75805-015-9
5	February 25, 2003	978-4-75805-019-7
6	March 26, 2003	978-4-75805-024-1
7	April 25, 2003	978-4-75805-027-2
8	May 26, 2003	978-4-75805-030-2
9	June 25, 2003	978-4-75805-036-4

=== Saiyuki (Ichijinsha New Edition) ===
No.	Original release date	Original ISBN	English release date	English ISBN
1	April 25, 2015	978-4-75803-041-0	February 25, 2020	978-1-64659-333-0
2	May 25, 2015	978-4-75803-049-6	August 18, 2020	978-1-64659-494-8
3	June 25, 2015	978-4-75803-065-6	November 17, 2020	978-1-64659-428-3
4	July 25, 2015	978-4-75803-096-0	January 5, 2021	978-1-64659-441-2
5	August 25, 2015	978-4-75803-106-6	January 5, 2021	978-1-64659-441-2

=== Saiyuki Anthology ===
No.	Release date	ISBN
1	July 24, 2010	978-4-75805-525-3

=== Saiyuki Gaiden (Enix Edition) ===
No.	Release date	ISBN
1	December 1, 2000	978-4-75750-373-1

=== Saiyuki Gaiden (Ichijinsha Edition) ===
No.	Release date	ISBN
1	December 28, 2005	978-4-75805-203-0
2	December 28, 2005	978-4-75805-204-7
3	July 25, 2007	978-4-75805-299-3
4	July 25, 2009	978-4-75805-427-0

=== Saiyuki Gaiden (Ichijinsha New Edition) ===
No.	Release date	ISBN
1	January 25, 2011	978-4-75803-019-9
2	January 25, 2011	978-4-75803-020-5

=== Saiyuki Gaiden Anthology ===
No.	Release date	ISBN
1	July 31, 2017	978-4-75803-307-7

=== Saiyuki Reload (Ichijinsha Edition) ===
No.	Original release date	Original ISBN	English release date	English ISBN
1	July 25, 2002	978-4-75805-000-5	August 9, 2005	978-1-59816-025-3
2	March 26, 2003	978-4-75805-023-4	September 13, 2005	978-1-59816-026-0
3	November 25, 2003	978-4-75805-046-3	March 7, 2006	978-1-59816-027-7
4	September 25, 2004	978-4-75805-095-1	June 13, 2006	978-1-59816-028-4
5	April 25, 2005	978-4-75805-139-2	October 10, 2006	978-1-59816-180-9
6	January 25, 2006	978-4-75805-205-4	January 9, 2007	978-1-59816-877-8
7	July 25, 2006	978-4-75805-229-0	April 10, 2007	978-1-42780-176-0
8	May 31, 2007	978-4-75805-288-7	June 14, 2008	978-1-42780-466-2
9	July 25, 2008	978-4-75805-354-9	January 1, 2009	978-1-42781-594-1
10	October 29, 2009	978-4-75805-445-4		

=== Saiyuki Reload (Ichijinsha New Edition) ===
No.	Release date	ISBN
1	September 25, 2015	978-4-75803-116-5
2	October 24, 2015	978-4-75803-125-7
3	November 25, 2015	978-4-75803-137-0
4	December 25, 2015	978-4-75803-144-8
5	January 25, 2016	978-4-75803-158-5

Saiyuki Ibun

No.	Release date	ISBN
1	April 25, 2013	978-4-75805-795-0

=== Saiyuki Reload Blast ===
No.	Release date	ISBN
1	June 25, 2012	978-4-75805-711-0
2	July 25, 2014	978-4-75805-931-2
3	October 31, 2017	978-4-75803-267-4

=== Saiyuki Reload Blast (two limited edition, one special) ===
No.	Release date	ISBN
1	June 25, 2012	978-4-75805-729-5
2	July 25, 2014	978-4-75805-932-9
3	October 31, 2017	978-4-75803-268-1

=== Saiyuki Reload Blast Anthology ===
No.	Release date	ISBN
1	July 31, 2017	978-4-75803-306-0

=== Novels ===
==== Movie version Gensoumaden Saiyuuki-Requiem for the Unselected (G Fantasy Novels) ====
No.	Release date	ISBN
1	October 1, 2001	978-4-75750-554-4

==== The first official novel of Saiyuki, written by Misagi Hijiri (Author), Kazuya Minekura (Illustrator) was published by G-Fantasy / Square Enix in 1999 ====
No.	Release date	ISBN
1	April 1, 1999	978-4-87025-494-7
2	April 1, 2000	978-4-75750-224-6
3	February 1, 2001	978-4-75750-335-9

==== Kazuya Minekura (Original/Illustration), Misagi Hijiri (Author) "Saiyuki" Ichijinsha Zero-sum Novels ====
No.	Release date	ISBN
1	July 1, 2005	978-4-75803-006-9
2	July 1, 2005	978-4-75803-007-6
3	July 1, 2005	978-4-75803-008-3

==== Saiyuki Omnibus - published July 23, 2010 by Ichijinsha ====
No.	Release date	ISBN
1	July 23, 2010	978-4-75803-013-7

==== Saiyuki Korotengi - published April 25, 2011 by Ichijinsha ====
No.	Release date	ISBN
1	April 25, 2011	978-4-75803-018-2

Related books

==== Saiyuki Character Book ====
No.	Release date	ISBN
1	April 25, 2012	978-4-75805-705-9
2	May 25, 2012	978-4-75805-712-7

==== Original Perfect Guide Saiyuki Series ====
No.	Release date	ISBN
1	July 28, 2005	978-4-75805-166-8
