= Saiyuki: Requiem =

2001 Japanese anime film

- Japanese theatrical poster

Japanese name
- Kanji: 幻想魔伝 最遊記 Requiem 選ばれざる者への鎮魂歌
Transcriptions
- Revised Hepburn: Gensōmaden Saiyūki: Requiem - Erabarezaru Mono e no Chinkonka
- Directed by: Hayato Date; Yuji Moriyama (chief)
- Written by: Katsuyuki Sumisawa
- Based on: Saiyuki by Kazuya Minekura
- Produced by: Ken Hagino; Tetsuya Watanabe; Tomoko Gushima
- Starring: Toshihiko Seki; Sōichirō Hoshi; Hiroaki Hirata; Akira Ishida; Akiko Yajima; Ryōtarō Okiayu; Dai Matsumoto
- Cinematography: Atsuho Matsumoto
- Music by: Motoi Sakuraba
- Production company: Pierrot
- Distributed by: Shochiku
- Release date: August 18, 2001
- Running time: 95 minutes
- Country: Japan
- Language: Japanese
- Box office: ¥250 million

Saiyuki: Requiem (Japanese: 幻想魔伝 最遊記 Requiem 選ばれざる者への鎮魂歌, Hepburn: Gensōmaden Saiyūki: Requiem - Erabarezaru Mono e no Chinkonka; lit. "Gensou Maden Saiyuuki - The Movie - Requiem") is the first animated film adaptation of the anime and manga series Saiyuki, produced by Pierrot. The events of the film take place after the first series. On the way west, the priest Genjo Sanzo and his three demonic companions, Son Goku, Sha Gojyo, and Cho Hakkai, save a girl who is being chased by a giant bird. Out of gratitude, she invites them to her house and provides them with food and shelter. Once there, strange things began to happen.

The film is directed by Hayato Date, written by Katsuyuki Sumisawa, and composed by Motoi Sakuraba. The film was first released in Japanese theaters on August 18, 2001. In July 2004, ADV Films licensed Saiyuki: Requiem in North America, which was released on DVD in January 2005. In Australasia, a DVD called Saiyuki: Requiem - The Movie was released on May 17, 2006, by Madman Entertainment. The movie is licensed in France by Kazé, which released two DVDs in June 2005 and January 2006.

The ending theme performed by Tetsu 69 is "Tightrope".

== Plot ==
The rebellious priest Genjo Sanzo, the hyperactive Monkey King Son Goku, the seductive Sha Gojyo, the cool, calm Cho Hakkai, and his dragon, which can transform into a jeep, are on the move again. After an exhausting but simple battle, the four are on the road in search of a place to stay and a warm meal. On the street, they meet a girl who runs towards them and warns them to get away from here as quickly as possible. But it's already too late. The big monster has already reached their car. While everyone tries to put the monster away and come to the girl's aid, Sanzo once again seems to be calm himself. He uses his weapon with complete confidence, but he doesn't destroy the monster; he just sends it fleeing. The girl is very grateful and would like to show her gratitude to her rescuers. However, since she has no money, she offers them her master's house for an overnight stay and supper. The four accept their offer. A decision that will prove to be a mistake in the coming hours because it turns out to be a trap. Some of the gang members are already starting to feel uneasy, but Sanzo knows from the start. Nevertheless, he decides against staying in the same room with his friends. Little by little, they are pitted against each other, and no one knows who the real one is anymore – except Sanzo. He remains the calm one with perspective.

== Voice cast ==
Character	Japanese Voice actor	English Voice actor
Genjo Sanzo	Toshihiko Seki	David Matranga
Son Goku	Sōichirō Hoshi	Greg Ayres
Sha Gojyo	Hiroaki Hirata	Illich Guardiola
Cho Hakkai	Akira Ishida	Braden Hunt
Houran	Akiko Yajima	Kelli Cousins
Go Dougan	Ryōtarō Okiayu	Andy McAvin
Dokugakuji	Dai Matsumoto	Mike MacRae
Lirin	Kaoru Morota	Hilary Haag
Kanan	Michiko Neya	Sasha Paysinger
Kougaiji	Takeshi Kusao	Vic Mignogna
Yaone	Yūko Minaguchi	Shelley Calene-Black

== Reception ==
Animetion gave it three stars out of five. The action scenes are described as stylish and well-designed. They felt that the quality and breadth of the film were evident from start to finish and that there was a real cinematic feel throughout the film. The animation, music, and design perfectly surround the film and draw the viewer in. Red XIII of Anime UK News gave an average score to the film and described the plot as quite predictable, saying, "Saiyuki Requiem is a fairly standard entry in the list of movies based on the series, a predictable outing that conforms to all the usual clichés with almost boring precision."

Dennis A. Amith of Nt2009.com gave it a B grade and found Saiyuki: Requiem an enjoyable film, but considered the quality of the animation to be average, feeling that the film was like TV episodes put together. He described the characters as very attractive and cool and considers this movie a good starting point for Saiyuki. DVD Talk's Don Houston said that the film correctly brings polar opposite characters together to achieve a goal and moves the film's story forward in a default and orderly manner, but, as an independent film, he found the film flawed due to the seemingly endless details of the characters. Dan Mancin of DVD Verdict considered the film to be structurally chaotic, and its central story is atmospheric and makes good use of non-linear storytelling without stepping over the line into pretension. Andrew Garner of DVDvisionjapan called Saiyuki: Requiem like a long TV series that proceeds with a plot that stands alone and praised its English dubbing.

== Release ==
In July 2004, ADV Films licensed Saiyuki: Requiem, and the DVD was released in North America on January 18, 2005. On May 19, 2009, the movie was released alongside Martian Successor Nadesico: The Motion Picture – Prince of Darkness on a double-pack DVD. In Australasia, a DVD called Saiyuki: Requiem - The Movie was released on May 17, 2006, by Madman Entertainment. The movie is licensed in France by Kazé, which released the DVD on June 29, 2005, and a new edition on January 18, 2006. The movie is licensed in Sweden by Kaze Sweden; and in Spain by Jonu Media.

Shochiku released the movie on DVD in 4 periods: January 21, 2002, September 21, 2002, December 3, 2005, and January 27, 2007, respectively, the same company released a Blu-ray on July 10, 2024.

== Gensomaden Saiyuki: Kibou no Zaika ==
Gensomaden Saiyuki: Kibou no Zaika (OAV) or Gensoumaden Saiyuki: The Crime of Hope (幻想魔伝 最遊記 ―希望の罪過) was produced by Pierrot, Group TAC, Dentsu, and Enix and distributed by Geneon on September 19, 2002.

"Kibou no zaika" was originally an interactive game. The company that released the DVD extracted only the anime scenes to the DVD, which caused a little pause between every scene change.

=== Other media ===
The light novel adaptation of the film was published by G-Fantasy / Square Enix on October 1, 2001.

Gensomaden Saiyuki: Requiem Original Soundtrack was published in 1-Disc alongside a special album on August 18, 2001, by Nippon Columbia.

== Track listing ==
All tracks are composed, arranged and produced by Akira Senju.

Gensomaden Saiyuki: Requiem - Original Soundtrack track listing
No.	Title	Length
1.	"Gensomaden" (幻想魔伝, Gensomaden)	2:39
2.	"Sorrowful Houran" (哀しみの朋蘭, Kanashimi no Houran )	2:15
3.	"Goku and His Nyoibou" (悟空と如意棒, Goku to Nyoi Bou)	1:50
4.	"Into the Dark" (闇の中へ, Yami no Nake E )	1:03
5.	"Silent Rage" (静かな怒り, Shizuka Na Ikari )	1:12
6.	"Lurking Evil" (待ち構える邪悪, Machikamaeru Jaaku)	2:06
7.	"Twisted Love" (屈折した愛, Kussetsu Shita Ai)	1:05
8.	"Dark Plot" (暗闇の陰謀, Kurayami no Inbou)	1:34
9.	"Dougan's Fang" (道雁の牙, Michi Kari no Kiba)	1:15
10.	"Suring Zombie" (押し寄せるゾンビ, Oshiyoseru Zombie)	1:04
11.	"Genmaoh" (幻夢王, Genmuou)	0:42
12.	"Sunny Table" (ひだまりの食卓, Hidarami no Shokutaka )	1:07
13.	"Paper Airplane" (紙飛行機, Kami Hikouki)	2:37
14.	"Brokenhearted Dogan" (傷心の道雁, Shoshin no Michikari )	4:56
15.	"Imminent Danger" (迫り来る危険, Semari Kuru Kiken)	1:55
16.	"Hakuryu and Kougaiji" (白竜と紅孩児, Hakuryu to Kougaiji)	1:55
17.	"Houran's Secret" (朋蘭の秘密, Houran no Himitsu)	1:57
18.	"Breathtaking Tension" (息詰まる緊張, Ikizumaru Kinchou)	1:45
19.	"Time for the Final Battle" (決戦の時, Kessen no Toki)	2:09
20.	"Twist of Fate" (運命の屈折, Unmei no Kussetsu)	2:30
21.	"The End and the Beginning" (終りと始まり, Owari to Hajimari)	2:19
22.	"To a New Journey" (新たな旅へ, Arata na tabi e)	2:25
23.	"Saiyuki" (最遊記, Saiyūki)	3:24
Total length:		45:44
