= Kahoru Sasajima =

Japanese voice actress

Kahoru Sasajima (笹島 かほる, Sasajima Kahoru; born October 4, 1973) is a Japanese voice actress from Chiba Prefecture, Japan.

== Filmography ==
=== Anime ===
- Hoshin Engi (1999 TV series), Likouha
- Fruits Basket (2001 TV series), Girl
- Happy World! (2002 OVA), Motoko
- Happy Lesson (2002 TV series), Satsuki Gokajo
- Tokyo Underground (2002, TV series), Tail Ashford
- Sister Princess: Re Pure (2002 TV series), Jiiya
- Moekan (2003–2004, OVA), 隷
- True Love Story (2003 OVA), Kiriya Satomi
- Happy Lesson Advance (2003 TV series), Satsuki Gokajo
- Saiyuki Reload (2003 TV series) Kouryu
- Shadow Star: Mukuro Naru Hoshi Tama Taru Ko (2003 TV series), Natsuki Honda
- Raimuiro Senkitan (2003 TV series), Asa Katou, Theme Song Performance
- Raimuiro Senkitan: The South Island Dream Romantic Adventure (2004 OVA), Asa Katou, Theme Song Performance
- Happy Lesson The Final (2004 OVA), Satsuki Gokajo
- Hit o Nerae! (2004, TV series) Kazumi Hayakawa
- Saiyuki Reload Gunlock (2004 TV series) Kouryu
- Daphne in the Brilliant Blue (2004 TV series), Rosemary
- Gantz (2004 TV series), Mika Kanda
- Major (2004 TV series)Ryota Sawamura
- Akahori Gedou Hour Rabuge (2005 TV series), Kaoruko Sajima
- Zettai Seigi Love Pheromone (2005 TV series), Kaoruko Sajima
- Hininden Gausu (2005 OVA), Kaese
- Kidō Shinsengumi Moeyo Ken (2005 TV series) Kiyomi Watase
- MÄR (2005-2007 TV series), Pluto
- Bakkyuu HIT! Crash Bedaman (2006 TV series), Hitto Tamaga
- Kagihime Monogatari Eikyū Alice Rondo (TV series 2006), Jack Jacqueline
- Musashi Gundoh (2006 TV series), Toyotomi Hideyori
- Saiunkoku Monogatari (2006 TV series), Yōshun
- GeGeGe no Kitaro (2007, TV series), Hanako
- Saiyuki Reload: Burial (2007 OVA), Kouryu
- Net Ghost PiPoPa (2008, TV series), Mamoru Shindo
- Spice and Wolf II (2009 TV series), Lant
- Level E (2011 TV series), Taiyo Akagawa
- The Knight in the Area (2012 TV series), Misaki Hanai

=== Dubbing ===
==== Live-action ====
- 21 Bridges as Frankie Burns (Sienna Miller)
- Boiling Point as Carly (Vinette Robinson)
- Heidi as Peter (Quirin Agrippi)
- Help, I Shrunk My Parents as Hulda Stechbarth (Andrea Sawatzki)
- The Lobster as The Maid (Ariane Labed)
- Love Beats Rhymes as Coco Ford (Azealia Banks)
- Mal-Mo-E: The Secret Mission as Goo Ja-young (Kim Sun-young)
- Memory as Davana Sealman (Monica Bellucci)
- Mr. Moll and the Chocolate Factory as Jackie (Lou Vogel)
- Peaceful as Eugénie (Cécile de France)
- Sound of Freedom as Katherine Ballard (Mira Sorvino)

==== Video games ====
- Dixie Kong, since Mario Superstar Baseball (2005)

==== Animation ====
- Marona's Fantastic Tale as Istvan's Mother
- The Owl House as Eda Clawthorne
- X-Men: Evolution as Amanda Sefton

== Singles and albums ==
- トゥルーラブストーリー Summer days, and yet ... プレキャラクターシリーズ Vol．2 桐屋里未 Mai 2, 2003
- HAPPY☆LESSON｢直球ヴィーナス｣(五箇条さつき)October 23, 2002
- "Cold Flowers" (凛花, "Rinka") released on December 25, 2002, and ranked 131st in Oricon singles charts.
- "Asa Katou" (加藤麻) image song album of the eponymous character released on May 7, 2003.
- さりげないきずな released on December 10, 2003
