= Gensomaden Saiyuki =

Japanese anime television series

- Gensomaden Saiyuki volume one DVD cover by ADV Films
- Genre: Adventure; Fantasy
- Anime television series
- Directed by: Hayato Date
- Produced by: Ken Hagino; Tetsuya Watanabe; Tomoko Gushima
- Written by: Katsuyuki Sumisawa
- Music by: Motoi Sakuraba
- Studio: Pierrot
- Licensed by: AUS: Madman Entertainment; NA: Enoki Films; ADV Films (2003–2009); AEsir Holdings (2013–present)
- Original network: TXN (TV Tokyo)
- English network: NA: Anime Network
- Original run: April 4, 2000 – March 27, 2001
- Episodes: 50
- Sequels
- Saiyuki: Requiem (anime film); Saiyuki Reload

Gensomaden Saiyuki (幻想魔伝 最遊記, Gensōmaden Saiyūki) is a Japanese anime television series that is based on Kazuya Minekura's manga series Saiyuki. The show is set in Shangri-La, an earthy paradise where humans and youkai (demons) live peacefully together. The world is invaded by "Minus Waves", which are created by the mixing of scientific research and magic in an attempt to resurrect an ancient, powerful and evil god named Gyumao. The youkais return to their bestial habits, killing and eating humans. Goddess Kanzeon sends the Buddhist monk Genjo Sanzo and his acolytes Son Goku, Sha Gojyo, and Cho Hakkai to Tenjiku (India) to stop the curse and prevent Gyumao's resurrection.

The series is produced by Studio Pierrot; it is directed by Hayato Date and written by Katsuyuki Sumisawa, and the music is composed by Motoi Sakuraba. Gensomaden Saiyuki is the first season of the Saiyuki anime series; it is followed in the first-series continuity by the film-adaptation-and-direct-sequel Saiyuki: Requiem in August 2001, and Saiyuki Reload from October 2003 to March 2004.

Gensomaden Saiyuki's 50 episodes were initially broadcast from April 4, 2000, to March 27, 2001, in Japan on TV Tokyo. In July 2001, ADV Films licensed the series in North America until 2009. Enoki Films holds the U.S. license to Gensomaden Saiyuki under the title Saiyuki: Paradise Raiders.

In October 2009, Madman Entertainment announced it had licensed Gensomaden Saiyuki in Australasia. The series was released at a rate of one episode a day and remained online until 20 January 2010. in North America AEsir Holdings licensed the anime, released the series as part of a complete collection of Saiyuki on DVD in February 2013 and April 2015, and on Blu-ray in March 2019.

The episodes have two opening and ending themes; the first opening theme "For Real" by Hidenori Tokuyama is used for the first twenty-six episodes and "Still Time" by Tokuyama is used for the remainder of the episodes. The two closing themes are "Tightrope" by Charcoal Filter and "Alone" by Mikuni Shimokawa.

== Voice cast and characters ==
Character	Japanese	English
Genjo Sanzo	Toshihiko Seki; Yuko Kobayashi (Kouryuu, Young Genjo Sanzo); Masako Kobayashi (Kouryuu)	David Matranga; Kevin Corn (Kouryuu, Young Genjo Sanzo)
Son Goku	Sōichirō Hoshi	Greg Ayres
Sha Gojyo	Hiroaki Hirata; Kayu Suzuki (young; Episode 36, 47)	Illich Guardiola
Cho Hakkai	Akira Ishida	Braden Hunt; Nyl Stewart (young; ep 37)
Hakuryu	Kaoru Morota	Kelli Cousins
Kougaiji	Takeshi Kusao	Vic Mignogna (Episode 5–18); Mike MacRae (Episode 21–50)
Dokugakuji	Dai Matsumoto	Jason Miesse
Yaone	Yūko Minaguchi	Shelley Calene-Black
Lirin	Kaoru Morota	Hilary Haag
Ni Jianyi	Hōchū Ōtsuka	Tommy Drake
Gyokumen Koushu	Shinobu Satou	Kaytha Coker
Prince Nataku	Kaho Kōda	Tony Oller
Homura	Toshiyuki Morikawa	Jason Douglas
Zenon	Jin Horikawa	John Swasey
Linchei	Ai Orikasa	Christopher Riley
Shoryu	Akiko Kimura	Ty Mayberry (episode 33)
Instructor Wang	Ben Pronsky	Atsushi Ii (episode 23)
Koumyou Sanzo	Ken Narita	Chris Patton
Kanzeon Bosatsu	Ikue Otani	Karen Coffer; Shawn Taylor (episode 7, 20–21)
Jade Emperor	Bakuto (episode 1-44)	Andy McAvin
Jiroushin	Takao Ishii	Todd Waite
Shien	Hiroshi Yanaka	Spike Spencer
Fake Sanzo	Takuma Suzuki (episode 10 and 32)	Alex Stutler
Fake Goku	Chō (episode 10 and 32)	Chris Patton
Fake Gojyo	Eiji Yanagisawa (episode 10 and 32)	Jason Douglas
Fake Hakkai	Takehiro Murozono (episode 10 and 32)	John Swasey (episode 31); Mike Vance (episode 32)
Gojun	Kazuhiro Yamaji	Jason Konopisos
Kenren	Hiroaki Hirata	Illich Guardiola
Konzen Douji	Toshihiko Seki	David Matranga
Tenpou	Akira Ishida	Braden Hunt
Rin Rei	Nobutoshi Canna	Monica Rial
Shuuei	Shigeru Ushiyama	Jay Hickman
Boy	Maki Mizuno (episode 20, 22)	Sam Foster (episode 22)

== Episode list ==
No.	Title	Original release date
1	"Go to the West"; Transliteration: "Harukanaru Nishi e" (Japanese: はるかなるの西へ)	April 4, 2000
A long time ago in the Far West, there was a world called Shangri-La. This is the origin of civilization and faith, where humans and evil spirits peacefully co-existed. Suddenly, a negative spiritual wave spread over this world, causing the evil spirits and monsters to become violent and begin attacking humans. Ordered by the Celestial Heavens, a priest named Sanzo recruits his acolytes and sets out on a journey to India in the Far West to find the culprit of this disaster.
2	"First Game – A Guide to the Land of the Dead"; Transliteration: "Yomi e no Annainin" (Japanese: 黄泉への案内人)	April 11, 2000
In a small town, our heroes meet a wounded girl called Ho-May, whose friend has been killed by an evil creature. Goku cannot tell Ho-May he is a creature in human disguise. spider-women disguised as a traveling entertainer ambushes the heroes. Goku fights for the kindness of Ho-May and her father, who prepares a tasty meal.
3	"His God, My God – The Divine Platform"; Transliteration: "Kami no iru Basho" (Japanese: 神のいる場所)	April 18, 2000
The heroes visit a huge temple on a rocky mountain, where the priests and apprentices live a strict life of studying sacred scrolls and purifying their souls under the principles of "no drinking, no smoking, and all tangible things are vain". They are surprised to see Sanzo partaking in these forbidden activities. Assassins sent by the evil monster Kogaiji attack the temple. Our heroes save the priests from the assassins' violence because the priests are prohibited from killing
4	"Crimson Tears"; Transliteration: "Akaneiro no Namida" (Japanese: 茜色の涙)	April 25, 2000
The heroes visit the house of a young girl named Shun-Rey, who is waiting for the return of her boyfriend – the young apparition of a spirit. Sha Gojyo is surprised when he hears the name of this monster, Gee-Yen, which has the same as his missing brother-in-law. The townsfolk tell the heroes the monster that attacked humans in the forest looked like Gee-Yen. Shun-Rey runs to the forest.
5	"Pure Assassin"; Transliteration: "Utsukushiki Ansatsusha" (Japanese: 美しき暗殺者)	May 2, 2000
Cheer-Rat (Yaone), one of Kogaiji's followers, wants to please her master. She asks Kogaiji to issue an order to destroy Sanzo's party. Cheer-Rat feels indebted to Kogaiji, who saved her from the monster the "Demon with One Hundred Eyes". Cheer-Rat plans to poison the heroes at a restaurant but hesitates after they save her from two drunken thugs. Cheer-Rat still wants to help her master so she makes a plan.
6	"Shower of Bullets"; Transliteration: "Jufu no Kaisou" (Japanese: 呪符の怪僧)	May 9, 2000
Visiting a small temple, the heroes hear a rumor of Rick-Do, a savior who destroys evil spirits and monsters. The heroes discover Rick-Do is actually Sanzo's senior fellow disciple and fortune-teller Rikudo (Shukett). Rikudo is possessed by a fetish talisman. In pouring rain, Rikudo attacks Goku, Sha Gojyo, and Hakkai.
7	"Farewell at Dusk"; Transliteration: "Tosogare no Wakare" (Japanese: 黄昏の別れ)	May 16, 2000
When Sanzo is severely injured, Goku's head ring, which controls the balance of his magic, falls off. Goku can now deliver devastating blows. Rikudo realizes his disadvantage and flees. Goku loses control, become delirious, and attacks Sha Gojyo and Hakkai!
8	"The Man Who Foretells Death"; Transliteration: "Shi o Uranau Otoko" (Japanese: 師を占う男)	May 23, 2000
The heroes arrive at a town where a bazaar is underway. They meet a dubious fortune-teller named Chin-Ih-So, who uses mahjong tiles to tell fortune. Chin-Ih-So precisely reveals Hakkai's past. Suddenly, a giant crab, apparently a ghastly apparition, appears to attack the heroes but efore they engage in battle, a tiny girl destroys the monster crab. She is Lilin, the younger sister of Kogaiji. Soon, Kogaiji and his followers arrive to help Lilin.
9	"Lethal Trap – A Party of Battle"; Transliteration: "Tatakai no Utage" (Japanese: 戦いの宴)	May 30, 2000
The heroes and Kogaiji's band engage in a fierce battle. Kogaiji realizes the secret of Goku and his comrades' infinite strength in battle is the power of spirits – to fight for one's own is the best way to help others. The monster crab controlled by an evil sorcerer appears again. The parties agree to a truce to get rid of the monster crab.
10	"A False Savior"; Transliteration: "Itsuwari no Kyuuseishu" (Japanese: 偽りの救世主)	June 6, 2000
Sanzo and his comrades arrive in a village where the residents believe their village was saved by the priest Sanzo. Thanks to this story, the heroes enjoy an enthusiastic welcome. However, a false party of Sanzo appears and the heroes are mistaken for imposters. The villagers jail the heroes, believing the bogus priest is the real Sanzo. That night, a monster assassin appears and the village is in a panic.
11	"Tragic Revenge. – The Death Laughs."; Transliteration: "Warau Shinigami" (Japanese: 笑う死神)	June 13, 2000
Awakened from a nightmare, Hakkai thinks about the girl he loved. When Sha Gojyo talks to Hakkai, a puppet controlled by the fortune-teller Chin-Ih-So attacks him and injects Sha Gojyo with the seed of a blood-sucking plant. The seed cannot be removed because it is too close to his heart. Sanzo tries to save Sha Gojyo by shooting the seed out of Sha Gojyo's body with a spirit-blasting gun. Sha Gojyo survives. Goku and White Dragon go out to fetch water and disappear.
12	"Wandering Destiny – Struggle in the Darkness."; Transliteration: "Yami to no Koubou" (Japanese: 闇との攻防)	June 20, 2000
The fortune-teller Chin-Ih-So approaches the heroes. Hakkai destroyed his family. Chin-Ih-So plots to cause Hakkai to go insane. Sha Gojyo and Goku are injured. Sanzo supports Hakkai in a silent battle with a dark, psychic world. Hakkai tries shake off a twisted illusion but, he is trapped by Chin-Ih-So's trick and suddenly attacks and wounds Sanzo. If Hakkai reverts back to himself, the heroes will quickly die.
13	"Crude Counterfeit – A Fruit of Death"; Transliteration: "Shi o Yobu Kajitsu" (Japanese: 死を呼ぶ果実)	June 27, 2000
Our heroes visit a temple where they grow a strangely shaped fruit. Two young disciples say they are taking care of the temple because the chief priest and all other monks left a month ago. Goku is hungry and reaches for the strange fruit. Sanzo senses something evil in the temple and the heroes decide to leave. Goku returns to prove nothing is wrong with the fruit of the temple but slips into a nightmare.
14	"A Sweet Client – I keep My Promise."; Transliteration: "Futari no Yakusoku" (Japanese: ふたりの約束)	July 4, 2000
Sanzo and three boys arrive in a small, remote village. When Sha Gojyo leaves to find pretty women, he meets a young woman who tags along with him. The woman tries to persuade Sha Gojyo to destroy a monster that killed her parents. Sha Gojyo is led to the monster's hideout and senses something weird is going on inside but does not realize it is a trap.
15	"The Ill-fated Guy – Spell of Red"; Transliteration: "Aka no Jubaku" (Japanese: 紅の呪縛)	July 11, 2000
The heroes have to sleep outside in the rain. Looking up in the rain, Sha Gojyo remembers three three years ago, he helped a young man named Chogo-Noh, who was lying on the roadside. Meanwhile, the Trinity Gods order Sanzo to arrest the man who massacred many monsters, who is Chogo-Noh.
16	"Be There! – A Praise for Staying Alive"; Transliteration: "Seija e no Sanka" (Japanese: 生者への讃歌)	July 18, 2000
Chogo-Noh flees into the woods to carry out his self-imposed mission. Suddenly, he is attacked by Crow-Man whose family Chogo-Noh killed. They fight and Crow-Man is shocked by Chogo-Noh's fighting spirit. Sanzo and Goku, who were tailing him, arrive and are followed by Sha Gojyo.
17	"Garden of Eden – A Eternal Paradise"; Transliteration: "Owari naki Rakuen" (Japanese: 終りなき楽園)	July 25, 2000
Sanzo and his comrades find numerous stoned monsters in a monsters' town called "Tofu-Gai" at the bottom of steep ravines. Goku, Sha-Gojyo and Cho Hakkai turn into stone statues because they are monsters too. Left alone, Sanzo asks a monster woman named Koran how he can save his friends. Koran introduces Sanzo to an old man called Muhan, who governs the town. Sanzo has to find a way to save his friends.
18	"Vice or Justice – The Truth of Justice"; Transliteration: "Seigi no Shinjitsu" (Japanese: 正義の真実)	August 1, 2000
Several monsters are missing. Yaone, a female warrior of Kogaiji, begins to investigate what is happening. Meanwhile, Sanzo and his three comrades find Tonpoo, an old friend of Sha Gojyo and Hakkai. Tonpoo tells the heroes he volunteered a militia called Fanron Troop, which consisted of humans tasked with hunting evil monsters. The same night, Yaone is captured by the captain of Fanron Troop when she sneaks into the camp.
19	"Don't go Alone – Desperate Girls"; Transliteration: "Nageki no Otometachi" (Japanese: 嘆きの乙女たち)	August 8, 2000
The heroes meet four beautiful sisters. Sanzo is reluctant to befriend them. Soon after they leave the sisters, the heroes discover the sisters want to kill them for saving the life of the eldest sister, who was possessed by a parasitic monster.
20	"Sandstorm – Trap of Quicksand"; Transliteration: "Ryuusa no Wana" (Japanese: 流砂の罠)	August 15, 2000
A monster that ate the priest Sanzo Senior hides in the desert. The heroes go into the desert and fall into quicksand. The desert monster has set a trap because he believes he will get eternal life if he eats a priest of great virtue. The monster becomes enraged by Sanzo's arrogant and disgraceful manner. In an underground jail, Goku, Sha Gojyo and Hakkai are engaged in a desperate battle with incessant scorpions.
21	"Selfish Dream – Reckless Run to Ruin"; Transliteration: "Hametsu e no Bousou" (Japanese: 破滅への暴走)	August 22, 2000
Five Sutras who are possessed by Sanzo and his comrades are needed for reviving Gyumao the Bull Satan. Trailing the Sutras, Kogaiji, Son of Bull Satan, crosses the desert and meets the heroes. Goku wants to help Sanzo, who is greatly weakened by scorpion poison but Kogaiji challenges him to a duel and proves to be an extraordinary warrior. Goku fears he cannot defeat Kogaiji with his normal power.
22	"Devastation – The Outcome of a Deadly Duel"; Transliteration: "Tatakai no Hate" (Japanese: 闘いの果て)	August 29, 2000
Goku takes out his head ring, which controls his infinite power; his sense of judgment vanishes, and he cannot recognize his friends and his enemies. With cruelty and violence, Goku begins to attack whoever he sees. No-one can stop Goku's devastating power but Sanzo manages to get up in front of Goku.
23	"Scapegoat – Reward of Subordination"; Transliteration: "Fukujuu no Daika" (Japanese: 服従の代価)	September 5, 2000
The heroes arrive at a Village with big canons sticking into the sky. They are surprised by a ceremony that offers a sacrifice to an evil monster that rules the residents. Hakkai is stunned by the young woman who is chosen as a sacrifice because she looks exactly like his dead girlfriend Kanan. The monster must be destroyed before the woman is sacrificed.
24	"Mother – Crimson Bond"; Transliteration: "Aka no Kizuna" (Japanese: 紅の絆)	September 12, 2000
Goku and Sha Gojyo enter a village in search of food, and meet a young mother named Yan-Min, who is hugging a new-born baby. The baby's eyes and hair are red like Goku's. Yan-Min's husband is a human-looking monster; the villagers despise her for having a monster's baby. A man called Nijenye is interested in the sadness and hatred spawned in her heart, and plans to use her secret feeling for his own purpose.
25	"Tomboy – Frightening Assassins!"; Transliteration: "Senritsu no Shikaku!" (Japanese: 戦慄の刺客)	September 26, 2000
Lilin, the young sister of Kogaiji, appears to challenge the heroes. Her trick is "Operation – Meat Bums on the Road", which fails to induce the heroes but surprisingly it works on three stupid monsters, who are defeated by Lilin and become her followers. Ordered by their new boss, they keep meddling in the heroes ways.
26	"Calling – No One Hears Your Cry."; Transliteration: "Todokazaru Sakebi" (Japanese: 届かざる叫び)	October 3, 2000
One of Kogaiji's troops, "Iron Demon Troop", assaults Sanzo and his comrades. The troop is destroyed by our heroes' overwhelming power. The troop's leader Rashu and a few soldiers survive. Rashu sets a trap to capture Sanzo and Goku in their armor. Goku and Sanzo cry inside their armor.
27	"Advent – The Evil God of War"; Transliteration: "Kourin・Toushintashi" (Japanese: 降臨・闘神太子)	October 10, 2000
Our heroes encounter new enemies from the heavens: Prince Homura, Zenon and Shien, who re neither human nor monsters but call themselves gods. Prince Homura is seeking Sanzo's Sutra of Dark Power. The gods say they know the heroes' previous existence.
28	"Lonely – The Signal of Rebellion"; Transliteration: "Honjyaku no noroshi" (Japanese: 反逆の狼煙)	October 17, 2000
Abandoning the Celestial Heavens, Prince Homura, Zenon and Shien decide to build a new world. They choose the tower and castle made by monster King Gailu and his warriors as their headquarters. The army of the Celestial Heavens, which is led by the self-professed gods, begins to attack and seize the tower. Leaving the battlefield, Prince Homura goes to see King Gairu with an offer.
29	"Unexpected Defeat – Fall of Castle Houto"; Transliteration: "Houtojou・Kanraku" (Japanese: 吠登城・陥落)	October 24, 2000
The Celestial army destroys the monster-warriors and soldiers in Castle Houto. Kogaiji and his followers are surprised by this defeat but Kogaiji realizes the three self-professed gods are his father Gyumao-Bull Satan. Kogaiji goes to the underground laboratory where an experiment with resurrection is underway. With Dokkakuji's help, Kogaiji fights against the Celestial army.
30	"Undertaker – An Invitation to Hell"; Transliteration: "Jigoku e no shoutaijou" (Japanese: 地獄への招待状)	October 31, 2000
The heroes walk into a desolate village and wonder what has happened there. Suddenly, four coffins of sizes equal to those of the heroes are pushed out and an illusion of a creature called The Undertaker appears. The Undertaker shows excessive courtesy to Sanzo and his comrades. Sha Gojyo is upset and Goku is angry. The Undertaker keeps telling disgusting stories, upsetting the heroes.
31	"Ambition – Arrogance of the 'Gods"; Transliteration: "Kamigami no ogori" (Japanese: 神々の驕り)	October 3, 2000
A platoon of five skilled warriors who scored many points at a military drill visit Prince Homura. They want to join the army of the Celestial Heavens. Prince Homura orders the warriors to destroy Sanzo's party and get the magic sutra. The platoon triumphantly marches out. Sanzo's party fight the platoon.
32	"Fake Star Strikes Back – Pride of the Impostors"; Transliteration: "Doukeshi no hokori" (Japanese: 道化師の誇り)	November 7, 2000
The heroes again meet the party of the bogus Sanzo. After the earlier incident, the bogus Sanzo never introduces himself as the priest Sanzo. The Bogus Sanzo and the impostors are fearful. The party of bogus heroes remember their pride as the best impostors in the world; they are sly and mean. They devise a plot to revenge the true heroes.
33	"Faraway Dream – Tears Dry Soon"; Transliteration: "Kareta namida" (Japanese: 枯れた泪)	November 14, 2000
While the heroes are struggling in a snowstorm, they meet Shoryu, a young monster who skillfully manipulates snow, ice, and water. Shoryu waits for the heroes to get Sanzo's sutra by the order of Prince Homura. Sanzo and three warriors are fooled by Shoryu's attack, which is empowered by an evil, forbidden spell. Shoryu's older sister Shoen is heading to Prince Homura's castle; she is ordered to get the Hallowed Sutra from Prince Homura by Koshu, the Lady Darkness who wants to revive Gyumao-Bull Satan.
34	"Second Contact – Warriors come back." Transliteration: "Toukami futatabi" (Japanese: 闘神再び)	November 21, 2000
Five skilled warriors of the Celestial Heavens appear in front of the heroes. They want to take the Sutra of Dark Power from Sanzo and force Son Goku side with them. The warrior attacks Goku and puts him in constant struggle. Goku can dodge, leap, and run out of deadly assaults.
35	"Solitude – The lonely heart" Transliteration: "Kodoku no tamashii" (Japanese: 孤独の魂)	November 28, 2000
Kogaiji visits the tomb of the girl he loved, who was reincarnated as a human. Kogaiji swears revenge on Son Goku and his comrades who defeated him in the Battle of Hoto Castle. Kogaiji summons and awakens the Demon of Recollection, and engages in a war of nerves.
36	"Brotherhood – A Crimson Flower"; Transliteration: "Akai hana" (Japanese: 紅い花)	December 12, 2000
Sanzo and his comrades are lost in deep woods in fog and rain, and have to sleep in the open. Sha-Gojyo hates this idea and tries to find a way out of the woods. He finds a cave and goes in to explore but soon realizes he is completely lost. Dokkakuji, Kogaiji's assistant who is also lost in the cave appears.
37	"Taciturnity – A Smile of Reticence"; Transliteration: "Tozasareta bishou" (Japanese: 閉ざされた微笑)	December 19, 2000
Sanzo and his party walk into a village in which Cho-Hakkai grew up in an orphanage. Hakkai has feelings of nostalgia and bitterness; he was a desperate child who never smiled. He meets Sister Shaohei, who spent her childhood in the same orphanage. She tells Hakkai there is a boy who never smiles, just like little Hakkai. Hakkai wants to see the boy.
38	"Fleeting Vision – An Unfilled Promise."; Transliteration: "Hatasenu yakusoku" (Japanese: はたせぬ約束)	December 26, 2000
The heroes defeat the monsters in the woods and get a good drink. While drinking, Sanzo recalls the incident involving his master Kohmyo-Sanzo a long time ago. Soon after, Sanzo and his comrades arrive in a village where they join and win a drinking competition.
39	"Misty Rain – Watering Sky"; Transliteration: "Ame" (Japanese: 雨)	January 9, 2001
Sanzo is gloomy and depressed in the never-ending rain. Goku worries Sanzo and tries but fails to cheer him up. Sanzo get more irritated and insults Goku. Upset, Goku runs out of the inn. Suddenly, Konzen, was Goku's guardian in the Celestial Heavens, appears in front of him.
40	"Twilight – The Gloomy Sun"; Transliteration: "Fukigen na taiyou" (Japanese: 不機嫌な太陽)	January 16, 2001
500 years ago. In the Celestial Heavens. Born from a stone, Goku was brought to Goddess of Mercy – Kanzeon Bosatsu. He was introduced to his guardian – Konzen Doji who is a handsome young man with beautiful blond hair. (Konzen is the previous existence of Sanzo.) He takes care of Goku just like his younger brother. Then, Goku meets a boy called Nataku. Even a small boy at Goku's age, Nataku is the Lord of War and is the only person in the Celestial Heavens, who is allowed to kill. He receives an order to subjugate the great monster, Bull Satan – Gyumao.
41	"Collage – A Silent tripple" Transliteration: "Shizuka naru hamon" (Japanese: 静かなる波紋)	January 23, 2001
One day Goku wants to see Nataku and sneaks into the Great Palace. He meets Kenren, the Commander General of the Army of Celestial Heavens. General Kenren is the previous existence of Sha-Gojyo. General Kenren is surprised to see Goku chained with weights on both hands and legs. Then, Nataku returns from the hunt of Gyumao. His body is covered with wounds. Goku worries Nataku. General Kenren suspects why all the soldiers who went for subjugation have no injuries.....
42	"Festival – Unforgettable Scenes"; Transliteration: "Wasure enu fuukei" (Japanese: 忘れえぬ風景)	January 30, 2001
Sanzo's party drop in a town called Saika on the day of Festival of God. They notice that the God the folks worship here is Shien. They do not know why, but Shien comes down to this place today every year. Lilin, a loyal follower of Kogaiji, learns from Ni-Jen-Yi that Shien and tow other Gods took the Hallowed Sutra from Gyokumen-Koshu. Lilin comes up to Saika and wages battle to Shien for the Hallowed SutraŠ.
43	"Tears – A Village of Illusion"; Transliteration: "Kyozou no machi" (Japanese: 虚像の街)	February 6, 2001
Zeon hears that One of the Sutras of World Commencement was found in a village. He visits the village to find if this news is true. Soon after he arrives there, Zeon helps a boy attacked by the monsters. He sees his own son's visage on this boy. Meanwhile in a neighboring village our heroes hear a rumor of a monster devouring human's spirits.
44	"Plunderer – Seizure of the Sutra of Dark Power"; Transliteration: "Kyoumon goudatsu" (Japanese: 経文強奪)	February 13, 2001
God Homura and his two fellow-Gods are ready to begin the Creation of New World. However, they need Sanzo's Sutra of Dark Power to accomplish their plan. Homura tells Sanzo to bestow the Sutra by the next morning. Sanzo has no intention to give it out. Our heroes know they will have hard battle against Gods. So, they have only shallow sleep. And the battle begins ....!
45	"Glorious Days – Before Dawn"; Transliteration: "Yoake mae" (Japanese: 夜明け前)	February 20, 2001
Five hundred years ago in the Celestial Heavens, Konzen – the previous existence of Sanzo – takes Goku to Tenpoh, Grand General of the entire force of the Celestial Heavens. Tenpo is the previous existence of Cho-Hakkai. Nataku, whose wounds have not healed, receives a new order of subjugation from Li-Tohten, the minister of the Celestial Heavens. General Kenren wants to take this order but he is refused and punished for his indecent behavior. Tenpoh is surprised at Kenren's reckless manner and becomes angered by Li-Tohten's selfish conduct.
46	"Chaos – Shaking Land"; Transliteration: "Yuragu daichi" (Japanese: 揺らぐ大地)	February 27, 2001
The Creation of New World of Homura, Shien. and Zeon has begun. Sanzo and his comrades go to the Tower of Konran, where Homura's party are supposed to wait for them. Instead, the heroes are attacked by monsters led by Gairu. The monsters are so weak and the battle quickly ends. When the heroes walk further, they know they have passed only a first easy barrier, and that more enemies are waiting.
47	"Guilty of Not Guilty"; Transliteration: "Kairitsu" (Japanese: 戒罪)	March 6, 2001
Goku single-handedly resists an attack of Homura's Royal Guards so his comrades can enter the tower to find Homura. The enemy uses an artifice called "Work of Repentance", forcing a person to remember past emotional hurts. Goku is stunned when he sees his mother-in-law crying in front of him.
48	"Absolutely Heaven! – Door to Freedom"; Transliteration: "Jiyuu e no tobira" (Japanese: 自由への扉)	March 13, 2001
Sanzo's party and Kogaiji's group confront Homura, Shien, and Zeon. Sanzo wants to take back his Sutra of Dark Power and Kogaiji has to get the Hallowed Sutra. Shien and Zeon decide to engage in battle side-by-side and send Homura to New World. When the battle begins, Shien releases his true power over to the heroes and Kogaiji's group.
49	"Missing Desire – Shining Paradise"; Transliteration: "Kazayaku rakuen" (Japanese: 輝く楽園)	March 20, 2001
Zeon follows Shien's performance and releases his true power. The combined power of the two gods overwhelms everybody on the battlefield. Sanzo quickly leaves the tower and follows Homura but he is ambushed by Goku, who is controlled by the "Work of Repentance". Without his head ring, Goku is wild and merciless, and attacks anyone in his way. Homura is about to step into the nearly completed New World.
50	"Alone – To the West"; Transliteration: "Nishi e" (Japanese: 西へ)	March 27, 2001
Goku returns to himself and jumps at Homura. Goku's power is greatly increased by his rage. Everybody thinks Goku has finished Homura with an explosive blow but Homura gets up again and takes the chains from his hands to release his true power. Homura's strength is devastating. Goku's comrades wants to help him but he says he is going to defeat the god by himself.

== Home media release ==
=== Japanese ===
Broadcast area	Broadcasting station	Broadcast period	Broadcast date	Broadcast series
Kanto area	TV Tokyo	April 4, 2000 - March 27, 2001	Tuesday 18 :30 - 19:00	TV Tokyo series
Hokkaido	TV Hokkaido	April 4, 2000 - March 27, 2001	Tuesday 18 :30 - 19:00	TV Tokyo series
Aichi Prefecture	TV Aichi	April 4, 2000 - March 27, 2001	Tuesday 18 :30 - 19:00	TV Tokyo series
Osaka Prefecture	TV Osaka	April 4, 2000 - March 27, 2001	Tuesday 18 :30 - 19:00	TV Tokyo series
Okayama Prefecture and Kagawa Prefecture	TV Setouchi	April 4, 2000 - March 27, 2001	Tuesday 18 :30 - 19:00	TV Tokyo series
Fukuoka Prefecture	TVQ Kyushu Broadcasting	April 4, 2000 - March 27, 2001	Tuesday 18 :30 - 19:00	TV Tokyo series
All over Japan	BS Japan	December 6, 2000 - November 23, 2001	Wednesday 18:55 - 19:25	TV Tokyo series BS broadcasting
Mie Prefecture	Mie Television	October 2000–2001	Monday 17:00 - 17:30	Independent Station
Shiga Prefecture	Biwako Broadcasting	June 29, 2000–2001	Thursday 19:00 - 19:30	Independent Station
Miyagi	Tohoku Broadcasting	July 7, 2001 - ?	Saturday 17:30 - 18:00	TBS Series
Fukushima Prefecture	TV You Fukushima	November 2000–2001	Tuesday 0:50 - 1:20 (Monday midnight)	TBS Series
Shizuoka Prefecture	Shizuoka Broadcasting	July 29, 2000–2001	Saturday 2:05-2:35 (Friday midnight)	TBS Series
All over Japan	AT-X	October 29, 2002 - May 2, 2003	Tuesday 11:00 - 12:00 (with repeat broadcast)	CS broadcasting
All over Japan	Kids Station			CS broadcasting

== Reception ==
Gensomaden Saiyuki won Animage magazine's Anime Grand Prix Award in 2000 and Genjo Sanzo won the Best Male Character category. In January 2001, "Gensomaden Saiyuki" was ranked second on Animage's list of 100 most-important anime ever published. In May 2002, Gensomaden Saiyuki was ranked fourth in an Animage's reader's poll of Top 20 Picks Best of 2001, and in August 2001, the series was ranked ninth in Newtype magazine's poll of top-10 Anime, and Genjo Sanzo was sixth in the top-ten male characters list.

In October 2004, the website Animaxis reported research had shown Saiyuki anime has become extremely popular among young Japanese women. In September 2005, Japanese television network TV Asahi broadcast a popularity poll based on a nationwide survey in which Saiyuki was placed 96th of the channel's Top 100 Anime. October 2006, TV Asahi broadcast a similar poll in which Saiyuki was placed 24th of the channel's Top 100 favorite Anime. In 2007, another large-scale poll by TV Asahi placed Gensomaden Saiyuki as the 27th-most-appreciated anime in Japan. In August 2020, Japan's biggest ranking website Goo Ranking published its list of the most-popular anime that debuted in the last 20 years. Among these titles, Gensomaden Saiyuki was ranked eighth. In March 2022, Cheyenne Wiseman of Comic Book Resources chose ten of the best anime that are based on novels; Gensomaden Saiyuki was ranked ninth.

=== Critical response ===
Sage Ashford of Comic Book Resources wrote the series Gensomaden Saiyuki looks brand new after two decades and provides a new spin on the journey to the west. Enoch Lau of THEM Anime Reviews gave the series a three-out-of-five-star review, describing the series as a low-budget presentation that is entertaining and fun, and mixes mythology and religion beyond recognition. TheOtaku.com rated the series 9.5 out of 10, praised the English dubbing, and called the voice actors superb. The reviewer stated the series is full of morals and life lessons, and explains one of the reasons for its popularity. They described the visual effects as excellent, the episodes as full of seriousness and heart-felt emotion, mixing a great variety of humor, but criticized "filler" episode that neither advance the story nor show the strengths of the characters. Manga News wrote the series has several flaws, especially in the beginning, but they appreciated the initiative of including the Gaiden part in the series.

Writing for Anime News Network (ANN), Bamboo Dong said he found "the adventures of Sanzo Group with random people/objects and the concept of redoing the classic Chinese myth with modern day equipment" to be interesting, and called Kazuya Minkura's story "creative". Zac Bertschy of ANN criticized the anime series but gave an above-average score to DVD 7: The Gods of War; Bertschy also praised the art, described the show as a brightly colored, well-designed world; praised its cinematic moments and fight scenes; and compared the improvement of the series to Rurouni Kenshin (1996), which has become more popular over time. Darius Washington of Anime Jump said the anime is "utterly pedestrian" and that it feels like "Ninja Scroll with a Weiss Kreuz complex", and criticized the English dubbing.

Layla Lawlor and Barb Lien-Cooper of Sequential Tart give an above-average score to Saiyuki Volume 1: The Journey Begins. Lien-Cooper, reviewing Saiyuki Volume 6: Demon Rising, graded it 8 out of 10 and praised the "interesting plots with varying tones (funny, scary, tragic), some unexpected twists and turns, and especially the characters". She also said the audience can see the depths of the characters and understand them. She also said the show's themes are "quite allegorical and enlightening in a 'choose good' sort of a way". Fellow Sequential Tart reviewer Sheena McNeil gave a 9-out-of-10 grade to first volume, and praised the art and animation, which has "some new styles of overlapped frames and use of static like shading". McNeil said the story "is definitely a new twist on the relationship between humans and demons as they normally get along peacefully ... [and] also combines a quest with a "Good vs Evil" battle"; and called the themes and characters "diverse". Later volumes of anime were also praised; McNeil praised the art style and gave a high score to Saiyuki Volume 3: Confronting Their Demons, and said: "I like that the main characters are not completely "good guys"—they all have dark pasts (and three are demons) and they're only doing this because they have to". She also stated the art techniques used for the flashbacks and backgrounds are different to those of other anime.

Sandra Dozier of DVD Verdict said Saiyuki "sort of resembles a very pretty, stylistic Dragon Ball Z", and called the eighth volume very enjoyable, and that she "found this volume to be relaxed in pace, letting the stories unfold without rushing it. Fight scenes were excellent and engaging, but too few on this particular volume." In her review of the ninth volume, Dozier called the disc a "nice suite of episodes" that explore the main characters' childhood memories, and said:"It's interesting to see some of the past events for these characters, and to see a very vulnerable side of Gojyo, especially". In her review of the tenth volume, Dozier called its animation "glossy and gorgeous", and the fight scenes "cutting-edge", but she found connecting with the main characters difficult.
