= Saiyuki Reload =

Japanese manga series

- Cover of the first tankōbon volume, featuring The Sanzo Party.

最遊記 RELOAD (Saiyūki Reload)
- Genre: Action; Fantasy
- Manga
- Written by: Kazuya Minekura
- Published by: Ichijinsha
- English publisher: AUS: Madman Entertainment; NA: Tokyopop
- Imprint: Zero Sum Comics
- Magazine: Monthly Comic Zero Sum
- Original run: March 28, 2002 – June 27, 2009
- Volumes: 10
Further information
Anime television series
Saiyuki Reload
Directed by	Tetsuya Endo
Written by	Tetsuya Endo
Music by	Daisuke Ikeda
Studio	Studio Pierrot
Licensed by	Crunchyroll: AUS: Madman Entertainment; NA: Discotek Media; UK: MVM Films
Original network	TXN (TV Tokyo)
Original run	October 2, 2003 – March 2, 2004
Episodes	25
Anime television series
Saiyuki Reload Gunlock
Directed by	Tetsuya Endo
Written by	Tetsuya Endo
Music by	Daisuke Ikeda
Studio	Studio Pierrot
Licensed by	Crunchyroll: AUS: Madman Entertainment; NA: Discotek Media
Original network	TX (TV Tokyo)
English network	US: AZN Television
Original run	April 1, 2004 – September 23, 2004
Episodes	26
Original video animation
Saiyuki Reload: Burial
Directed by	Koichi Ohata
Written by	Katsuyuki Sumisawa
Studio	ARMS
Licensed by	NA: Discotek Media
Released	April 27, 2007 – December 28, 2007
Runtime	30 minutes per episode
Episodes	3
Anime television series
Saiyuki Reload: Zeroin
Directed by	Misato Takada
Written by	Michiko Yokote; Aya Matsui
Music by	Yūsuke Shirato
Studio	Liden Films
Licensed by	NA: Sentai Filmworks; SA/SEA: Muse Communication
Original network	AT-X, Tokyo MX, BS11
English network	SEA: Animax Asia
Original run	January 6, 2022 – March 31, 2022
Episodes	13
- Sequel
- Saiyuki Reload Blast (2009– )

Saiyuki Reload (Japanese: 最遊記 Reload, Hepburn: Saiyūki Reload) is a Japanese manga series that is a sequel to the series Saiyuki, which Kazuya Minekura wrote and illustrated. Saiyuki Reload began serialization in Ichijinsha's josei manga magazine Monthly Comic Zero Sum from March 2002 to June 2009, the chapters of which were collected and published in ten tankōbon volumes.

Saiyuki Reload's manga includes a sequel titled Saiyuki Reload Blast. Saiyuki Reload was adapted into two anime television series, Saiyuki Reload and Saiyuki Reload Gunlock, both of which were broadcast in Japan from October 2003 to September 2004. An original video animations (OVA) titled Saiyuki Reload: Burial, which covers the "Burial" arc, was broadcast in 2007. A remake of the anime series Saiyuki Reload Gunlock that was titled Saiyuki Reload: Zeroin, which covers the "Even a Worm" arc, was broadcast between January and March 2022.

Saiyuki Reload has been licensed in North America by Tokyopop, which published nine out the ten volumes from August 2005 to January 2009, leaving one volume short from finishing the series.

== Premise ==
Shangri-La is a peaceful world where humans and monsters coexist. Monsters start attacking humans due to the resuscitation experiment of the great demon Gyumao. To stop the experiment Sanzo, Goku, Gojyo, and Hakkai head for Hoto Castle in Tenjiku Province. On their journey west, they encounter various foes and are attacked by memories of the past. They try to solve the mystery of the monsters' change.

== Media ==
=== Manga ===
Monthly Comic Zero Sum May 2002 issue cover, the issue where Saiyuki Reload began its serialization (left), and August 2009 issue cover, which the series ended (right).

Saiyuki Reload, written and illustrated by Kazuya Minekura, was serialized in Ichijinsha's josei manga magazine Monthly Comic Zero Sum. Its first installment was published in the magazine's May 2002 issue on March 28, 2002. (Note: It started in the magazine's first issue (May issue) of 2002 (cover date May 1), which was released on March 28.) The series finished its final installment in the August 2009 issue of Monthly Comic Zero Sum, published on June 27, 2009. (Note: It finished in the magazine's August issue of 2009 (cover date August 1), which was released on June 27.) Ichijinsha collected its chapters in ten tankōbon volumes, released from July 25, 2002, to October 29, 2009, and from September 2015 to January 2016 published a new paperback edition consisting of five volumes.

In North America, Tokyopop has licensed the series, and published it in nine volumes from August 2005 to January 2009, leaving one volume unpublished. In Australasia, Madman Entertainment published the series in nine volumes from October 2009 to October 2010.

In France, Panini Comics licensed Saiyuki Reload; in Spain by Mangaline Ediciones; in Italy by Dynit; and Ever Glory Publishing licensed the Chinese translation in Taiwan and published it from September to August 2022; and Jonesky published the manga in Hong Kong. In August 2022, at Taipei International Book Exhibition, Ever Glory Publishing released a book called Saiyuki Reload Collector's Edition containing all 10 volumes .

=== Anime ===
Saiyuki Reload adapted the manga series of the same name. It aired from October 2003, to March 2004 and consisted of 25 episodes. A 26-episode sequel titled Saiyuki Reload Gunlock aired from April to September 2004. The other two series are licensed by Geneon in North America. In February 2006, Geneon and Tokyopop agreed to cross promote several properties. Tokyopop's translation of Saiyuki GunLock was advertised on Geneon's DVD releases for the same series, and vice versa.

In April 2007, a new original video animation (OVA) series was released by Studio Pierrot, which covers the "Burial" arc of the Saiyuki Reload manga titled Saiyuki Reload: Burial. In January 2021, Liden Films announced a new anime series titled Saiyuki Reload: Zeroin, which covers the "Even a Worm" arc of the Saiyuki Reload manga. The main cast members reprised their roles. It aired from January 6 to March 31, 2022, on AT-X and other networks.

== Reception ==
Zassosha's manga magazine, Puff, ranked the series the tenth-best long-story manga of 2006. The manga volumes were frequently ranked in the top manga. The 10th volume was ranked the 18th-top-selling manga in Japan from November 2 to 8 2009, selling 40,513 copies and a total of 114,605 copies after ranking seventh the previous week and selling 74,092 copies.

=== Critical response ===
Ash Brown of Manga Bookshelf reviewed the manga's first three volume. He praised the artwork and called it more polished but criticized the story for being simple and lacking character development. Jarred Pine of Anime on DVD praised the first volume's packaging but criticized the story, stating: "Saiyuki Reload so far seems to have lost a lot of its charm and magic, relying much more on posing bishies and their oozing cool guy attitudes rather than crafting interesting stories to tell". Michael Deeley of Manga Life liked the premise and Art styles, liked how the art "switches from a realistic to cartoony style in the moment of action" and described the manga as "a good balance of action and drama" that is "bipolar, an action-comedy, one part and the other part is dark and dour".

Publishers Weekly praised the protagonists, calling them likeable and enjoyable for new readers, stating: "with a winning combination of charming heroes, clever dialogue, great fight scenes and engaging stories, Reload is solid entertainment all the way". Manga News gave an Average score to the first three volumes of the series, stating Sayuki Reload had moved away from the original plan and could not function as smoothly as the first series. Later volumes were awarded High score and praised.

M. Natali of Bd Gest gave a three-out-of-five score to the third volume, describing the story as more-or-less skillful in setting up and delving into the past of Sanzo's character, and the unusual aspect of the main characters, who have become "bad boys with attitude", which he found to be one of the series' strengths. Nicolas Demay of Planete BD described the series as having "very interesting cuts and selected shots are cinematic" but he criticized volume 6, calling it "a transition volume that isn't really gripping".
