= Saiyuki Reload Gunlock =

- Season 3
- Saiyuki Reload Gunlock volume one DVD cover by Geneon
- Native name
- Japanese: 最遊記リロードガンロック
- No. of episodes: 26

Release
- Original network: TV Tokyo
- Original release: April 1 – September 23, 2004

Season chronology
- ← Previous; Saiyuki Reload Next → Saiyuki Reload Blast

Saiyuki Reload Gunlock (最遊記リロードガンロック, Saiyūki Rirōdo Ganrokku) is a sequel and the third season of the Saiyuki anime television series produced by Studio Pierrot. Adapted from the manga of Saiyuki Reload by Kazuya Minekura, the series is directed by Tetsuya Endo, written by Tetsuya Endo and composed by Daisuke Ikeda.

The series is the sequel of Saiyuki Reload, premiered on TV Tokyo from April 1, 2004, to September 23, 2004, and consist of 26 episodes. Saiyuki Reload Gunlock follows some of the events of the Saiyuki Reload manga. Much of the Hazel arc had not yet been written when the anime was being produced, therefore the story and characterization of Hazel in particular is different from that in the manga. Gunlock starts off deviated from the manga, until midway into the series, but strays from it during its finale.

Saiyuki Reload Gunlock was licensed by Geneon in North America, A total of seven DVDs of the Saiyuki Reload Gunlock anime series were released by Geneon, along with an Artbox DVD which was published on May 2, 2006. Geneon released the first volume on April 25, which include the first four episodes of the 26-episode series, also a Special Edition of the first volume released on May 2, 2006. A Complete box set was originally solicited for November 20, 2007, but never released due to Geneon cancelling DVD sales.

AZN TV aired the series on October 29, 2007, to December 25, 2007.

On March 10, 2021, Crunchyroll added the series for streaming.

On September 27, 2022, Discotek Media licensed the anime for a Blu-ray release in standard definition.

A new OVA has been released by Studio Pierrot, which covers the "Burial" arc of the Saiyuki Reload manga; it is called Saiyuki Reload: Burial. An anime television series adaptation of the Saiyuki Reload Blast manga series aired from July 5 to September 20, 2017, on Tokyo MX, TV Aichi, BS11, Sun TV. It ran for 12 episodes. Also, a new anime series produced by Liden Films titled Saiyuki Reload: Zeroin has been announced on January 10, 2021. It aired from January 6 to March 31, 2022, on AT-X and other networks.

Three pieces of theme music are used for the episodes—one opening themes and two ending themes. The opening themes is "Don't look back again" by WAG. The two ending themes, "Mitsumeteitai" by flow-war and "Shiro no Jumon" by doa.

== Episode list ==
No. overall	No. in season	Title	Original release date
76	1	"Temple of Demons"; Transliteration: "Mamono ga Sumu Tera" (Japanese: 魔物が棲む寺)	April 1, 2004
77	2	"Nightmare Unleashed"; Transliteration: "Hanatareta Akumu" (Japanese: 放たれた悪夢)	April 8, 2004
78	3	"Raging Torrent"; Transliteration: "Gekiryuu" (Japanese: 激流)	April 15, 2004
79	4	"Encounter"; Transliteration: "Souguu" (Japanese: 遭遇)	April 22, 2004
80	5	"Combat"; Transliteration: "Tousou" (Japanese: 闘争)	April 29, 2004
81	6	"Awakening"; Transliteration: "Kakusei" (Japanese: 覚醒)	May 6, 2004
82	7	"Cursed Board Game"; Transliteration: "Noroi no sugoroku" (Japanese: 呪いの双六)	May 13, 2004
83	8	"The Red-Haired Woman"; Transliteration: "Akai kami no onna" (Japanese: 紅い髪の女)	May 20, 2004
84	9	"Showdown"; Transliteration: "Taiketsu" (Japanese: 対決)	May 27, 2004
85	10	"Buried Dream"; Transliteration: "Umoreta yume" (Japanese: 埋もれた夢)	June 3, 2004
86	11	"Hakkai Runs Away From Home?!"; Transliteration: "Hakkai no iede!?" (Japanese: 八戒の家出!?)	June 10, 2004
87	12	"Mansion of Marionettes"; Transliteration: "Karakuri no yakata" (Japanese: からくりの館)	June 17, 2004
88	13	"The Man From the West"; Transliteration: "Nishi kara kita otoko" (Japanese: 西から来た男)	June 24, 2004
89	14	"The Whereabouts of the Miracle"; Transliteration: "Kiseki no yukue" (Japanese: 奇跡の行方)	July 1, 2004
90	15	"To the Limits of Mourning"; Transliteration: "Tsuitou no hate ni" (Japanese: 追悼の果てに)	July 8, 2004
91	16	"Revival"; Transliteration: "Saisei" (Japanese: 再生)	July 15, 2004
92	17	"Onslaught"; Transliteration: "Shuugeki" (Japanese: 襲撃)	July 22, 2004
93	18	"Misgivings"; Transliteration: "Ginen" (Japanese: 疑念)	July 29, 2004
94	19	"Reminiscence"; Transliteration: "Tsuioku" (Japanese: 追憶)	August 5, 2004
95	20	"Rift"; Transliteration: "Kiretsu" (Japanese: 亀裂)	August 12, 2004
96	21	"The Man Who Was Revived"; Transliteration: "Yomigaerishi otoko" (Japanese: 蘇りし男)	August 19, 2004
97	22	"Strategy"; Transliteration: "Sakuryaku" (Japanese: 策略)	August 26, 2004
98	23	"Breakthrough"; Transliteration: "Toppokou" (Japanese: 突破口)	September 2, 2004
99	24	"Mortal Combat"; Transliteration: "Shitou" (Japanese: 死闘)	September 9, 2004
100	25	"The Thing That Should Be Protected"; Transliteration: "Mamoru bekimono" (Japanese: 守るべきもの)	September 16, 2004
101	26	"Lamentation"; Transliteration: "Doukoku" (Japanese: 慟哭)	September 23, 2004

== Reception ==
In 2005, at the 27th Anime Grand Prix Award, Saiyuki Reload Gunlock was ranked the seventeenth-best anime title.
