= Saiyuki Reload (TV series) =

- Season 2
- Saiyuki Reload volume one DVD cover by Geneon
- Native name
- Japanese: 最遊記リロード
- No. of episodes: 25

Release
- Original network: TXN (TV Tokyo)
- Original release: October 2, 2003 – March 2, 2004

Season chronology
- ← Previous; Gensomaden Saiyuki Next → Saiyuki Reload Gunlock

Saiyuki Reload (最遊記リロード, Saiyūki Rirōdo) is a Japanese anime television series adapted from the Saiyuki and Saiyuki Reload manga series by Kazuya Minekura. Produced by Studio Pierrot, the series is directed by Tetsuya Endo, written by Tetsuya Endo and composed by Daisuke Ikeda.

The series is the sequel of Gensomaden Saiyuki, premiered on TV Tokyo from October 2, 2003, to March 25, 2004. Saiyuki Reload was licensed by Geneon in North America, and consist of 25 episodes. In the Saiyuki Reload Priest Genjo Sanzo and companions Cho Hakkai, Sha Gojyo, and Son Goku maintain their westward journey to stop the resurrection of the demon Gyoumao. As the reputation of the Sanzo Ikkou precedes them, they continue to fight demon assassins at every turn, but they must also deal with increasing tensions within their group in order to defeat a powerful enemy.

The final thirteen episodes adapt the final chapters of Saiyuki that the previous series did not adapt and the initial arcs of Saiyuki Reload manga, while the first thirteen episodes are original stories. A sequel titled Saiyuki Reload Gunlock was also created by the companies and aired on the same network. A new OVA has been released by Studio Pierrot, which covers the "Burial" arc of the Saiyuki Reload manga; it is called Saiyuki Reload: Burial. An anime television series adaptation of the Saiyuki Reload Blast manga series aired from July 5 to September 20, 2017, on Tokyo MX, TV Aichi, BS11, Sun TV. It ran for 12 episodes. Also a new anime series produced by Liden Films titled Saiyuki Reload: Zeroin has been announced on January 10, 2021. It aired from January 6 to March 31, 2022, on AT-X and other networks.

Saiyuki Reload premiered on the Starz/Encore Action channel in North America on November 8, 2006.

On February 18, 2021, Crunchyroll added the series for streaming.

On November 30, 2021, Discotek Media licensed the anime for a Blu-ray release in standard definition as it includes the original Japanese language, English subtitles and the English dub.

Three pieces of theme music are used for the episodes—one opening themes and two ending themes. The opening themes is "Wild Rock" by BUZZLIP. The two ending themes, "ID" by flow-war and "Fukisusabu Kaze no Naka de" by WAG.

== Episode list ==
No. overall	No. in season	Title	Original release date
51	1	"Run - The Bullet Reloaded Again"; Transliteration: "Tama wa Futatabi Komerareta" (Japanese: 弾は 再び込められた)	October 2, 2003
52	2	"Wanted Dead or Alive - Moving Trap"; Transliteration: "Ugomeku Wana" (Japanese: うごめく罠)	October 9, 2003
53	3	"Lethal Weapon - The Strongest Enemy in History"; Transliteration: "Shijou Saikyou no Teki" (Japanese: 史上最強の敵)	October 16, 2003
54	4	"Negative Energy - Last Promise"; Transliteration: "Saigo no Yakusoku" (Japanese: 最後の約束)	October 23, 2003
55	5	"Voice - Sleeping Memory"; Transliteration: "Nemuru Omoide" (Japanese: 眠る思いで)	October 30, 2003
56	6	"Sad Memory - Rescue"; Transliteration: "Dakkan" (Japanese: 奪還)	November 6, 2003
57	7	"Little Will - Small Friend"; Transliteration: "Chiisana Aibou" (Japanese: 小さな相棒)	November 13, 2003
58	8	"Poison - Delicious Food"; Transliteration: "Oishii Ryouri" (Japanese: 美味しい料理)	November 20, 2003
59	9	"Self Defense - Misunderstood Castle"; Transliteration: "Ochinai Shiro" (Japanese: 落ちない城)	November 27, 2003
60	10	"Trick or Treak - Demon - Genjo Sanzo"; Transliteration: "Genjou Sanzou" (Japanese: 妖怪・玄奘三蔵)	December 4, 2003
61	11	"Mother - Pleasant Traces"; Transliteration: "Yasashii Omokage" (Japanese: 優しい面影)	December 11, 2003
62	12	"Tiny Dream - Mountain of Mysterious Disappearances"; Transliteration: "Kamikakushi no Yama" (Japanese: 神かしの山)	December 18, 2003
63	13	"Lovely Baby - Just a Tiny Tiny Story"; Transliteration: "Honno Chiisana Chiisana Ohanashi" (Japanese: ほんの小さなちいさなお話)	December 25, 2003
64	14	"Black Crow - Whisper of Darkness"; Transliteration: "Kurayami no Sasayaki" (Japanese: 暗闇のささやき)	January 8, 2004
65	15	"Secret Ambition - Premonition"; Transliteration: "Yokan" (Japanese: 予感)	January 15, 2004
66	16	"Opposite - Footprint"; Transliteration: "Ashiato" (Japanese: あしあと)	January 22, 2004
67	17	"Wish - Ungrantable Wish"; Transliteration: "Kanaerarenai Negai" (Japanese: 叶えられない 願い)	January 29, 2004
68	18	"Critical Day - Sorrowful Bonds"; Transliteration: "Kanashii Kizuna" (Japanese: 哀しい絆)	February 5, 2004
69	19	"Farewell"; Transliteration: "Kami-sama" (Japanese: カミサマ)	February 12, 2004
70	20	"Chase - Prelude"; Transliteration: "Jokyoku" (Japanese: 序曲)	February 19, 2004
71	21	"Don't Cry - Battle"; Transliteration: "Sentou" (Japanese: 戦闘)	February 26, 2004
72	22	"Pain - Breakable Things"; Transliteration: "Kudakareta Mono" (Japanese: 砕かれたもの)	March 4, 2004
73	23	"Dawn - Our Ways of Doing"; Transliteration: "Ore-tachi no Yarikata" (Japanese: オレ達のやり方)	March 11, 2004
74	24	"Go Ahead - Rematch"; Transliteration: "Saisen" (Japanese: 再戦)	March 18, 2004
75	25	"Nothing to Give - End"; Transliteration: "Kecchaku" (Japanese: 決着)	March 25, 2004

== Reception ==
In 2004, at the 26th Anime Grand Prix Awards, Saiyuki Reload was the fourth-most-popular Anime title, and Genjo Sanzo was ranked the seventh-best Male Character.

=== Critical response ===
Animetion praised the first volume of the series gave it four stars out of five, described its animation as great with a rock music that supports the excellent characters. an action-packed adventure with a mix of comedy and tons of drama and strong characters. finds the ending of the first volume more emotional and interesting, and Sanzo's fight with a doppelganger in the third episode feels very tense. Animetion graded the second volume 3 stars out of five, they described this volume as a fairly average sequel with a fairly clever, entertaining and mostly light story with a bit of drama and action, which doesn't move the story forward at all. Nargis of Anime UK News gave an above average score to first volume of the series, called it brazen, stating that "it's [sic] attempts to be heartfelt comes across all wrong and what you get is a rather hilarious comedy. It's a nice change to see heroes who aren't perfect or noble. The anime is not intelligent but very funny." Katherine of The Escapist Magazine praised the story, dialogue and animation, and found the animation style impressive to the point where even the darkest scenes shine brightly. she described the series like Rainbows and Sunshine of the demon slaying genre.

Janet Crocker of Animefringe.com rated the third volume of the series 3-out-of-5, described the design of the characters of Sanzo and Gojyo as beautiful, the animation of the series as smooth, but she does not consider it revolutionary and finds the story of this volume very boring. John Sinnott of DVD Talk gave a 3-out-of-5 score to the Story content of third volume, felt that between the middle of the first act and the middle of the next episode, the story grew a little and he sees Saiyuki Reload as similar to the first series. Don Houston of DVD Talk in his review of volume six, described Sanzo's team as cantankerous as ever, which makes them vulnerable due to disrespect and inability to adapt to each other. Sarah of Anime UK News gave a 7-out-of-10 Grade to the sixth volume and 8 to volume Seven of the series, praised the original artwork, described Saiyuki Reload as "a genuine dramatic tension", the last episode as unexpected and praises the English dubbing and calls the series, "a surprisingly satisfying and dramatic climax to an uneven series – which leaves many threads untied for the sequels 'Saiyuki Reload Gunlock'."
