= List of Saiyuki video games =

Cover of first Saiyuki video game, "Gensomaden Saiyuki Sabaku no Shikami".

Saiyuki video games have appeared for various consoles. Most of them are role-playing, card, or adventure games, based on the TV show Saiyuki.

== Series ==
=== Portable ===
Gensomaden Saiyuki: Sabaku no Shikami
- Developer: J-Wing
- Publisher: J-Wing
- Series: Gensomaden Saiyuki
- Platform: GAME BOY COLOR
- Release: (Japan) March 23, 2001
- Genre: Role-Playing
- Mode: Single-player

Gensomaden Saiyuki: Sabaku no Shikami is a role-playing video games, published by J-Wing, which was released in Japan on March 23, 2001.

Gensomaden Saiyuki Retribution: Hi no Ataru Basho De
- Developer: PicPac-Airreal
- Publisher: Mubik
- Series: Gensomaden Saiyuki
- Platform: WonderSwan
- Release: (Japan) June 7, 2001
- Genre: Role-Playing
- Mode: Single-player

Gensomaden Saiyuki Retribution: Hi no Ataru Basho De

Gensou Maden Saiyuuki Retribution: Hi no Ataru Basho De is a role-playing video game, developed by PicPac-Airreal and published by Mubik, which was released in Japan in 2001.

=== Home console ===
Gensomaden Saiyuki: Harukanaru Nishi e
- Developer: J-Wing
- Publisher: J-Wing
- Series: Gensomaden Saiyuki
- Platform: PlayStation
- Release: (Japan) December 26, 2002
- Genres: Miscellaneous, Board / Card Game
- Mode: Single-player

Gensomaden Saiyuki : Harukanaru Nishi e is a Miscellaneous game, published by J-Wing, which was released in Japan in 2002.

Gensomaden Saiyuki: Hangyaku no Toshin Taishi
- Developer: Digital Kids
- Publisher: Digital Kids
- Series: Gensomaden Saiyuki
- Platform: Game Boy Advance
- Release: (Japan) August 1, 2003
- Genre: Adventure
- Mode: Single-player

Gensomaden Saiyuki : Hangyaku no Toshin Taishi is an Adventure game, developed and published by Digital Kids, which was released in Japan on August 1, 2003.

Saiyuki Reload
- Developer: Bandai
- Publisher: Bandai
- Series: Gensomaden Saiyuki
- Platform: PlayStation 2
- Release: (Japan) March 18, 2004
- Genre: Role-Playing
- Mode: Single-player

Saiyuki Reload is a Role-Playing game, published by Bandai, which was released in Japan on March 18, 2004. the game feature visual novel style elements was released by Bandai for the PlayStation 2. The player is an original character who journeys with Genjyo Sanzo, Son Goku, Sha Gojyo and Cho Hakkai. The player commands the four in menu-based battles that allow for attacks, special attacks, and combination attacks. , and Bandai included a bonus Saiyuki Reload voice CD for those who pre-ordered and Mini drama (includes original episodes recorded for the game).

Saiyuki Reload Gunlock
- Developer: Bandai
- Publisher: Bandai
- Series: Gensomaden Saiyuki
- Platform: PlayStation 2
- Release: (Japan) August 5, 2004
- Genres: Action, fighting
- Mode: Single-player

Saiyuki Reload Gunlock was released in Japan on August 5, 2004, by Bandai for the PlayStation 2. This Action fighting game features a total of eight playable characters including Sanzo, Goku, Gojyo and Hakkai as well as Kougaiji, Chin Yisou, Kamisama, and Hazel. Playable game modes include traditional single and multiplayer modes, as well as Practice Mode, Watch Mode, and a story-akin Dramatic Mode.

Gensomaden Saiyuki: Sin of Hope
- Developer: Enix
- Publisher: Geneon Entertainment
- Platform: Game Boy
- Release: (Japan) September 19, 2002
- Genre: Card game
- Mode: Single-player

Gensomaden Saiyuki: Sin of Hope

Geneon Entertainment released the game on DVD on September 19, 2002.

== Online ==
Saiyuki Reload Gunlock
- Developer: GungHo Online Entertainment
- Platform: Windows 2000 (SP4) / XP
- Release: (Japan) September 1, 2004
- Genre: ACT (online only)
- Mode: Multiplayer

Saiyuki RELOAD GUNLOCK On August 10, 2004, "GungHo Online Entertainment" has announced that the online action game will start service from September 1.

== See also ==
- List of Game Boy Advance games
- List of role-playing video games
- List of Adventure game
