= Saiyuki Ibun =

Japanese manga series

- Cover of the first tankōbon volume, featuring Koumyou Sanzo

最遊記異聞 (Saiyūki Ibun)
- Genre: Adventure; Fantasy; Historical
- Manga
- Written by: Kazuya Minekura
- Published by: Ichijinsha
- Imprint: Zero Sum Comics
- Magazine: Comic Zero Sum WARD
- Original run: September 16, 2009 – May 16, 2013 (on hiatus)
- Volumes: 1

Saiyuki Ibun (Japanese: 最遊記異聞, Hepburn: Saiyūki Ibun) is a Japanese manga series that serves as a prequel to the Saiyuki series Kazuya Minekura wrote and illustrated. The series tells the story that takes place about 40 years before the events of the main story at Taisoji, a priest training temple known as the greatest in Shangri-La. the story of those who would become the future Sanzo monks, including the one who would later be known as Koumyou Sanzo.

Saiyuki Ibun began serialization in Ichijinsha's shōjo manga magazine Comic Zero Sum WARD since September 2009, with its chapters collected in one tankōbon volumes. The series has been on an extended hiatus since May 2013.

A drama CD released in July 2014, by Ichijinsha and a stage musical adaptation of the manga that serves as the sixth stage musical of Saiyuki Kagekiden series, which run at Tokyo Dome City's Theatre G-Rosso from September 4, to 9 2018.

== Plot ==
The story is set at Taisoji, one of the most famous Shugyo temples in Shangri-La. located right in the icy mountains. In this enclosure isolated from everything, hundreds of aspiring monks undergo harsh training, whether in the field of martial arts or spirituality. risking their lives to undergo penance in order to obtain the right to inherit the title of Priest Sanzo. Among them are Toudai, Genkai and the one who seems the most dissipated of all: Hōmei. the story follows Koumyou Sanzo the teacher and guardian of Genjo Sanzo when he was young, the series depicting the early days of him, years before the first Saiyuki storyline.

== Media ==
=== Manga ===
Comic Zero Sum WARD No. 11 (September 2009) cover, the issue where Saiyuki Ibun began its serialization.

Saiyuki Ibun began serialization in Ichijinsha's shōjo manga magazine Comic Zero Sum WARD on September 16, 2009. (Note: The series started in the magazine 11th issue of 2009 (cover date), which was released on September 16.) In November 2012, it resumed after a 28-month break, the first tankōbon volume was planned to be released in March 2013 but was postponed the following month on April 25, 2013, when it was published alongside a limited edition. before going on an extended hiatus on May 16, 2013. in Italy, the manga is licensed by Dynit, which published the first volume on November 16, 2013; and Tong Li Publishing licensed the Chinese translation, which published the first volume alongside a limited edition on April 19, 2019.

==== Volume list ====
No.	Release date	ISBN
1	April 25, 2013	978-4-75805-795-0; 978-4-75-805796-7 (LE)

=== Drama CDs ===
In February 2014, it was announced that Saiyuki Ibun has been made into a drama CD.

The first volume it was released On July 25, 2014, by Ichijinsha. It featured many of the characters appearing in volumes one and narration by Toshihiko Seki, who is well known for his role as Genjo Sanzo.

=== Musicals ===
In October 2017, a musical adaptation of the manga titled Saiyuki Kagekiden: Ibun It was announced, Saiyuki Kagekiden: Ibun is a new performance and the sixth stage musical of Saiyuki Kagekiden series that had run at Tokyo Dome City Theater G Rosso from September 4, to 9 2018. In May 2018, The cast members were announced.

The musical was directed and screenplay by Kaori Miura. In July 2018, Saiyuki Kagekiden: Ibun was reveals character visuals.

Shun Mikami portrayed Priest Koumyou Sanzo, Mitsuru Karahashi played Priest Ukoku Sanzo, Shin Tamura as Hōmei, Shōta Ōnuma as Tōdai, Taiga Fukuzawa as Genkai, Yamato Furuya as Seiran, Yūki Maekawa as Dōtaku, Yū Futaba as Joan, Hirokazu Tsukioka as Ganpuku, Kenshin Saitō as Choun, Shōta Fukui as Gicho, Ryōta Yato as Ryuzen and Ujisuke as Priest Jikaku. Rakuten TV streamed the stage live.
