= Discotek Media =

American entertainment company

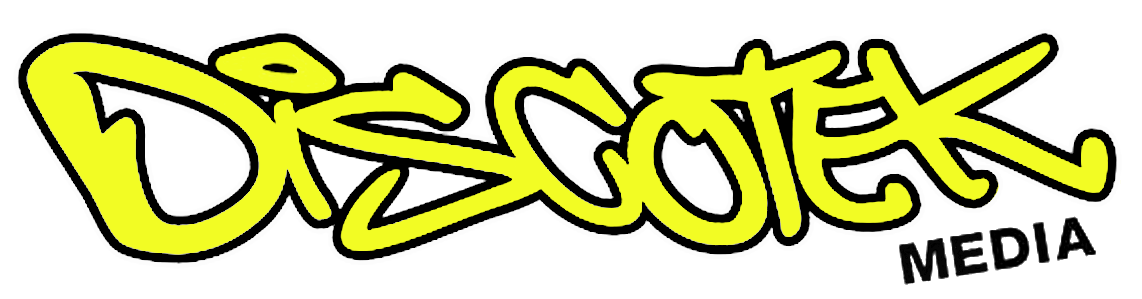
- Type: Private
- Industry: Entertainment
- Genre: Anime; asian films
- Founded: 2005; 21 years ago
- Headquarters: Altamonte Springs, Florida, U.S.
- Area served: United States; Canada
- Services: Licensing; Publishing; Streaming
- Website: discotekmedia.com

Discotek Media is an American entertainment company based in Altamonte Springs, Florida, focused on distribution and licensing Japanese anime, films, and television series.

== History ==
Formed in 2005, Discotek primarily focuses on licensing retro titles from the 1970s, 1980s, and 1990s, a lot of them "license rescued" from other companies such as Funimation, Viz Media, ADV Films, Bandai Entertainment, Geneon, Manga Entertainment, etc. Their licenses include most of the Lupin the Third franchise, the first four seasons, and the first eight films of Digimon, Fist of the North Star, Sonic X, Hajime no Ippo, Urusei Yatsura, Galaxy Express 999, Bobobo-bo Bo-bobo, Monster and the 1997 Berserk series, as well as OVAs such as Giant Robo, Golden Boy, and Gunbuster and films such as Memories and Project A-ko. The company has also acquired several more recent titles and has collaborated with streaming service Crunchyroll on several releases, including KonoSuba, Kemono Friends, and 5 Centimeters per Second.

Discotek is notable for being a major adopter of the SD Blu-ray format, using it to release anime that do not have HD masters available. The company has utilized unusual methods to find English dubs for which the masters have been lost. Such techniques include using a Betamax copy of Nutcracker Fantasy in order to remaster the international cut of the film, and reaching out to the fan community to locate the English dub of the third season of Medabots.

Discotek commissioned their first original English-language dub for the April 2016 release of Lupin III: Jigen's Gravestone. In 2022, the company announced a new sub-label for live-action films, Nihon Nights, and another for tokusatsu television series and films, Toku Time. The former began with the Blu-ray release of Uzumaki, and the latter began with the release of Space Sheriff Gavan.

== Titles ==
- A Wind Named Amnesia
- Aho-Girl
- All Purpose Cultural Cat Girl Nuku Nuku
- Aim for the Ace!
- Angel Cop
- As Miss Beelzebub Likes
- Bananya
- Battle Athletes
- Berserk (1997 TV series)
- Blue Seed
- The Bullet Train
- Case Closed
- Chie the Brat
- Cleopatra (1970 film)
- Combattler V
- Cromartie High School
- Crusher Joe
- Dallos
- Dear Brother
- Devilman
- Dino Mech Gaiking
- Dual! Parallel Trouble Adventure
- Electric Dragon 80.000 V
- Elemental Gelade
- Fatal Fury: The Motion Picture
- Flying Phantom Ship
- Freedom Project
- Future Robot Daltanious
- Galaxy Express 999 (film)
- Gekijōban Zero
- Genocyber
- Getter Robo Armageddon
- God Mars
- Goku Midnight Eye
- Golden Boy
- Golgo 13
- Great Mazinger
- Hanasakeru Seishōnen
- Hans Christian Andersen's The Little Mermaid (1975 film)
- Heart and Yummie
- Hi-Scool! Seha Girls
- Horus Prince of the Sun
- Inukami!
- Kenichi: The Mightiest Disciple
- Kimagure Orange Road
- Lady Georgie
- Legend of Dinosaurs & Monster Birds
- Love Com
- Lupin the Third
- Machine Robo
- Machine Robo: Battle Hackers
- Magic Knight Rayearth
- Magical Girl Lyrical Nanoha
- Mazinger Edition Z: The Impact!
- Mazinger Z
- The Mobile Cop Jiban
- Mon Colle Knights
- Monster
- Monster Rancher (TV series)
- Mrs. Pepper Pot (TV series)
- Ms. Koizumi Loves Ramen Noodles
- Ms. Vampire Who Lives in My Neighborhood
- My Monster Secret
- New Cutie Honey
- NG Knight Ramune & 40
- Ninja Senshi Tobikage
- Ninja Scroll: The Series
- Powered Armor Dorvack
- Rainbow: Nisha Rokubō no Shichinin
- Reborn!
- Recently, My Sister Is Unusual
- Saint Tail
- Saiyuki Reload (TV series)
- Saiyuki Reload: Burial
- Saiyuki Reload Gunlock
- S-CRY-ed
- Sex & Fury
- Sgt. Frog
- Shaman King (2001 TV series)
- Sherlock Hound
- Shin Tetsujin 28
- Shogun's Samurai
- Skull-face Bookseller Honda-san
- Space Emperor God Sigma
- Space Sheriff Gavan
- Space Sheriff Sharivan
- Star Ocean EX
- Street Sharks
- Suicide Club (film)
- Super Dimension Century Orguss
- Symphogear
- Tachigui: The Amazing Lives of the Fast Food Grifters
- Tales of Phantasia
- Tales of Symphonia
- Tetsujin 28 FX
- The King of Braves GaoGaiGar
- The Legend of Calamity Jane
- The Princess and the Pilot
- The Twelve Kingdoms
- Thermae Romae
- Tomorrow's Joe 2
- Toriko
- Tōshō Daimos
- Ultimate Muscle
- Unico
- Video Warrior Laserion
- Violence Jack
- Virtua Fighter (TV series)
- Zatch Bell!
