= Kelli Cousins =

American former voice actress

Kelli Cousins is an American former voice actress. She has provided voices for Japanese anime titles for ADV Films. She also wrote script adaptations for anime under the alias Kathleen Moynihan. She lives in Chicago, Illinois.

== Voice roles ==
=== Anime ===
- Chance Pop Session - Akari Mizushima
- Colorful - Consolation Prize, Additional Voices
- Diamond Daydreams - Akari Harada
- Excel Saga - Roppanmatsu 1
- Full Metal Panic! - Seina Kaguyama (Eps. 9-12)
- Kino's Journey - Kino
- Martian Successor Nadesico - Harumi Tanaka, Mari (Ep. 23), Seelie (Ep. 13)
- Neo Ranga - Ushio Shimabara
- Orphen: The Revenge - Charlotte (Ep. 8), Esperanza (Ep. 8, 11)
- Princess Nine - Seira Morimura
- Rahxephon - Helena Bähabem
- Rune Soldier - Celecia, Odessa (Ep. 14)
- Saiyuki - Dr. Huang (Eps. 9-29), Hakuryu, Houfa (Ep. 25), Shunrei (Ep. 4)
- Steel Angel Kurumi - Kurumi
- The Samurai - Chigusa Chimatsuri

=== Video games ===
- Unlimited Saga - Laura, Norff

=== Live-action dubbing ===
- Gamera: Revenge of Iris - Ayana Hirasaka

== Production credits ==
=== ADR script ===
- Air
- Cromartie High School
- Diamond Daydreams
- Kaleido Star
- Kanon
- Pani Poni Dash!
- Slayers Premium
