= Saiyuki Reload Blast =

Japanese manga series

- Cover of the first tankōbon volume, featuring Genjo Sanzo

最遊記 Reload Blast (Saiyūki Reload Blast)
- Genre: Adventure; Epic; Fantasy
- Manga
- Written by: Kazuya Minekura
- Published by: Ichijinsha
- Imprint: Zero Sum Comics
- Magazine: Monthly Comic Zero Sum
- Original run: December 28, 2009 – present
- Volumes: 3
- Anime television series
- Directed by: Hideaki Nakano
- Written by: Kenji Konuta
- Music by: Tatsuya Kato
- Studio: Platinum Vision
- Licensed by: NA: Crunchyroll; SA/SEA: Muse Communication
- Original network: AT-X, Tokyo MX1, Sun TV, TV Aichi, BS11
- English network: SEA: Animax Asia
- Original run: July 5, 2017 – September 20, 2017
- Episodes: 12
- Sequel
- Saiyuki Reload: Zeroin

Saiyuki Reload Blast (Japanese: 最遊記 RELOAD BLAST, Hepburn: Saiyūki Rirōdo Burasuto) is a Japanese manga sequel to Saiyuki Reload and the final part of Saiyuki series written and illustrated by Kazuya Minekura. It began serialization in Ichijinsha's josei manga magazine Monthly Comic Zero Sum since December 2009, with its chapters collected in three tankōbon volumes as of October 2017. The story follows the adventures of The Sanzo Party after a long journey, as the group arrives at the borders of India, their final destination.

An anime television series adaptation produced by Platinum Vision aired from July 2017 to September 2017. Crunchyroll has licensed the TV series, and Funimation released it on home video as part of the two companies' partnership. Muse Communication licensed the series in South and Southeast Asia; they aired it on Animax Asia and later released it on their YouTube channel. The series serves as a sequel to Saiyuki Reload Gunlock and the fourth season of the Saiyuki anime television series.

== Voice cast and characters ==
Character	Japanese Voice Actor	English Voice Actor
Genjo Sanzo	Toshihiko Seki	David Matranga
Son Goku	Sōichirō Hoshi	Greg Ayres
Cho Hakkai	Akira Ishida	Micah Solusod
Sha Gojyo	Hiroaki Hirata	Ian Sinclair
Kougaiji	Takeshi Kusao	Vic Mignogna
Kanzeon Bosatsu	Rei Igarashi	Shelley Calene-Black
Dokugakuji	Jin Yamanoi	Jessie James Grelle
Saitaisai	Junichi Suwabe	Aaron Roberts

== Plot ==
While humans and demons were finally living peacefully in Shangri-La, someone attempted to resurrect an ancient evil demon. Consequently, a horde of creatures began savagely attacking humans. Genjo Sanzo, an unconventional monk, embarks on a journey to the West to quell this evil resurgence. He is accompanied by three powerful beings—half-men, half-demons. After a lengthy journey, The Sanzo Party finally arrives at the border of India. Their battles intensify in a strange land deeply affected by peculiar occurrences. Moreover, they encounter a tragic fate from 500 years ago. What awaits Sanzo and his group at the culmination of their long and arduous journey?

== Media ==
=== Manga ===
Monthly Comic Zero Sum February 2010 issue cover, the issue where Saiyuki Reload Blast began its serialization.

The manga is a sequel to Saiyuki Reload and the final part of Saiyuki series, written and illustrated by Kazuya Minekura, Saiyuki Reload Blast started in Ichijinsha's josei manga Monthly Comic Zero Sum on December 28, 2009, Following a hiatus that began in September 2010, the manga resumed in March 2012, The first volume was released in July of the same year, with a limited edition that included a mini art book released on June 25.

In July 2013, the publication of Saiyuki Reload Blast slowed down due to Minekura's health. Ichijinsha published the second volume in July 2014. In April 2016, the publication paused again. Initially, the third volume was planned to be released in August 2017 but was postponed until October that year, when it was published alongside a special edition. The series went on hiatus in October 2017 and resumed 18 months later, and shortly the manga go on hiatus again and after a five-year hiatus, it returned to its publication on September 28, 2024. Ichijinsha has collected its chapters into individual tankōbon volumes. The first volume was released on April 25, 2009. As of October 31, 2017, three volumes have been released. In January 2021, Ritsuhiro Mikami released a one-shot for the series.

In Italy, the manga is licensed by Dynit; and Tong Li Publishing licensed the Chinese translation.

==== Volumes ====
No.	Release date	ISBN
1	June 25, 2012	978-4-75805-711-0; 978-4-75-805729-5 (LE)
2	July 25, 2014	978-4-75805-931-2; 978-4-75-805932-9 (LE)
3	October 31, 2017	978-4-75803-267-4; 978-4-75-803268-1 (SE)

=== Anime ===
An anime television series adaptation of the Saiyuki Reload Blast manga series, serving as a sequel to Saiyuki Reload Gunlock, aired from July 5 to September 20, 2017, on Tokyo MX, TV Aichi, BS11, and Sun TV. It ran for 12 episodes. Crunchyroll licensed the series, and Funimation released it on home video as part of the two companies' partnership. Muse Communication licensed the series in South and Southeast Asia; it aired on Animax Asia and later released on its YouTube channel. Saiyuki Reload Blast BD/DVD Combo Pack and BD essentials blast were published in North America by Funimation on July 24, 2018, and January 28, 2020, respectively. The episodes were collected by Frontier Works on four DVDs and Blu-rays released from August 23 to November 29, 2017.

==== Episodes ====
No. overall	No. in season	Title	Directed by	Written by	Storyboarded by	Original release date
102	1	"Squall"; Transliteration: "Toppū" (Japanese: 突風)	Hiroyuki Okuno	Kenji Konuta	Shigeyuki Miya	July 5, 2017
103	2	"Cloud Mirror"; Transliteration: "Unkyō" (Japanese: 雲鏡)	Hideaki Nakano	Kenji Konuta	Hideaki Nakano	July 12, 2017
104	3	"Sky Burial"; Transliteration: "Tensō" (Japanese: 天葬)	Yoshinobu Tokumoto	Kenji Konuta	Takashi Kobayashi	July 19, 2017
105	4	"Nataku"; Transliteration: "Nata" (Japanese: 哪吒)	Satoshi Saga	Kenji Konuta	Hideaki Nakano	July 26, 2017
106	5	"Flower Banquet"; Transliteration: "Kaen" (Japanese: 花宴)	Yoshinobu Tokumoto	Kenji Konuta	Yoshinobu Tokumoto	August 2, 2017
107	6	"Promise"; Transliteration: "Yakusoku" (Japanese: 約束)	Hideaki Nakano	Kenji Konuta	Hideaki Nakano	August 9, 2017
108	7	"Kouten"; Transliteration: "Kōten" (Japanese: 恒天)	Hiroyuki Okuno	Kenji Konuta	Hiroyuki Okuno	August 16, 2017
109	8	"Barrier"; Transliteration: "Kekkai" (Japanese: 結界)	Shunsuke Machitani	Kenji Konuta	Shunsuke Machitani	August 23, 2017
110	9	"A Chance Encounter"; Transliteration: "Kaigō" (Japanese: 邂逅)	Hiroyuki Okuno; Akira Katō	Kenji Konuta	Yoshinobu Tokumoto	August 30, 2017
111	10	"Imperial Order"; Transliteration: "Chokumei" (Japanese: 勅命)	Hideaki Nakano	Kenji Konuta	Hideaki Nakano	September 6, 2017
112	11	"Raid"; Transliteration: "Shūgeki" (Japanese: 襲撃)	Satoshi Saga	Kenji Konuta	Satoshi Saga	September 13, 2017
113	12	"Haiten"; Transliteration: "Haiten" (Japanese: 背天)	Hideaki Nakano	Kenji Konuta	Hideaki Nakano	September 20, 2017

== Home media release ==
Volume	Date	Discs	Episodes
1	August 23, 2017	1	1–3
2	September 27, 2017	1	4–6
3	October 25, 2017	1	7–9
4	November 29, 2017	1	10–12

== Reception ==
=== Manga ===
Saiyuki Reload Blast manga individual volumes consistently ranked in the top weekly Japanese ranking chart of best-selling manga. The first volume ranked thirteenth among the top-selling manga in Japan during June 25 to July 1, 2012, selling a total of 60,545 copies. The second volume ranked twenty-fifth among the top-selling manga in Japan during July 28 to August 3, 2014, selling 32,121 copies and a total of 61,622 copies. Saiyuki Reload Blast third and Special Edition volumes ranked twenty-third and forty-second among the top-selling manga in Japan during October 30 to November 5, 2017, selling 34,879 copies and 18,607 copies respectively.

=== Anime ===
Saiyuki Reload Blast volume one Blu-ray cover by Frontier Works

The series Saiyuki Reload Blast secured the third position among the top 20 anime during mid-2017, according to Japanese fans. Additionally, it was recognized as one of the top-three most-acclaimed anime of July 2017. Moreover, in the third quarter of 2017, it claimed the fifth position on Goo Ranking website's poll of the top-20 favorite late-night anime of mid-2017. Lastly, it secured the seventh spot on Kadokawa's eb-i Xpress website's poll of the top 20 "most anticipated summer 2017 Anime."

In May 2017, the two voice actors of Saiyuki Reload Blast, Toshihiko Seki (Genjo Sanzo) and Sōichirō Hoshi (Son Goku), appeared on the cover of the 22nd volume of Cool Voice magazine. Individual volumes have appeared in Oricon's weekly chart of best-selling anime DVD/blu-ray disc, taking several high spots. The first DVD volume of Saiyuki Reload Blast anime ranked twentieth during the week of August 28 to September 3, 2017, selling 1,992 copies after ranking eleventh the previous week. The second volume ranked eleventh during the week of September 25 to October 1, 2017, selling 1,681 copies. The third DVD volume ranked twentieth during the week of October 23 to 29, 2017, selling 1,764 copies after ranking sixth the previous week. The fourth DVD volume of Saiyuki Reload Blast anime ranked third during the week of November 27 to December 3, 2017, selling 1,595 copies. The first and second Blu-ray volumes ranked twelfth and sixteenth of the top-selling Japan's animation blu-ray disc ranking during August 21–27 and September 25-October 1, 2017, selling 2,301 copies and 2,337 copies respectively. The third and fourth Blu-ray volumes ranked seventeenth and ninth during October 23–29 and November 27-December 3, selling 1,995 copies and 2,167 copies respectively.

Olivia Subero of Comic Book Resources noted that the series infuses historical anime with a supernatural twist. She praised the main characters, the powerful demons of the story, and the intense fight scenes. Gabriella Ekens of Anime News Network (ANN) found interest in the relationship between the characters and praised their story, describing it as serious with well-balanced character-based silly behavior, and becoming attached to them. On the visual level, she called Saiyuki Reload Blast disappointing, noting the show's distinct art style, which is only rarely noticeably off-model. She stated that the dramas delve into characters' past lives and revisit them in a way that you don't already know about, and it's clearly a next-stage arc in an extended saga, if it doesn't change in a strange way. Fellow (ANN) reviewer Nick Creamer feels that Blast hits its targets perfectly and describes the character and background designs as "quite solid." Another fellow (ANN) reviewer, James Beckett, describes the combination of the framework of traveling to the west with western styles as a more modern spaghetti, finding its purpose very interesting. He notes that the action scenes are short but light and entertaining enough. Also, Paul Jensen and Rebecca Silverman of (ANN) see the first episode as a kind of standalone reintroduction to the main characters, which they find somewhat predictable, calling it a very ordinary and somewhat predictable Western. Charles Solomon of Animation Scoop criticized the main characters for not changing and growing. Marshall Daley of Bubbleblabber rated the series 9 out of 10, stating that the story is great and a huge improvement on the plot. He finds the characters strong and deep, and praises the voice acting. Daley expresses that the animation is much better, encouraging viewers to come out and play, and the art is stylish as usual. He concludes by saying, "This story did justice to the raw material and actually enhanced the characters, giving them deeper and more internal motivations for their actions, making their connection in their new life quite natural." In his review of the anime Blu-ray, Chris Beveridge of The Fandom Post described the show's plot as more of a flashback, linking it to the nature of their journey, and described the story as changing in a good way.
