= Braden Hunt =

American actor

Braden Hunt is an American voice actor who dubbed roles in Japanese anime for ADV Films.

== Roles ==
- The Mythical Detective Loki Ragnarok as Bandit 2 (ep. 8)
- Diamond Daydreams as Tezuka
- Full Metal Panic! as Shirai Satoru (ep 8)
- Gravion Zwei as Hans
- Hakugei: Legend of the Moby Dick as Shiro Tokisada
- Madlax as Chris Krana
- Misaki Chronicle as Male Cadet
- Peacemaker Kurogane as Souji Okita
- Saiyuki as Cho Hakkai
- Saiyuki Gaiden as Gensui Tenpou
- Sister Princess as Wataru Minakami
- This Ugly Yet Beautiful World as Takeru Takemoto
- Ushio and Tora as Construction Worker (ep 5), Friend (ep 7–8), Man in Crowd (ep 9), Villager (ep 9)
