= Saiyuki Reload: Burial =

Japanese OVA series

- Cover of the first DVD Standard Edition drawn by Kazuya Minekura

最遊記 RELOAD - burial - (Saiyūki Reload: Burial)
- Original video animation
- Directed by: Koichi Ohata
- Produced by: Mika Nomura; Yoshihide Kondo; Yoshito Danno
- Written by: Katsuyuki Sumisawa
- Studio: Pierrot (production); Dentsu (production); Arms (animation)
- Licensed by: NA: Discotek Media
- Released: April 27, 2007 – Mar 28, 2008
- Runtime: 30 minutes per episode
- Episodes: 3

Saiyuki Reload: Burial, known in Japan as Saiyūki Reload: Burial (最遊記 RELOAD - burial -), is an original video animation (OVA) series based on the "Burial" arc of the Saiyuki Reload manga and a prequel to the Saiyuki mythological adventure series written and illustrated by Kazuya Minekura. The OVA series was directed by Koichi Ohata and written by Katsuyuki Sumisawa. Saiyuki Reload: Burial's story takes place in the past, offering a view of the Saiyuki quartet before their formation and journey to the west.

Saiyuki Reload: Burial OVA was first released in Japan on April 27, 2007.

The Burial prequel was licensed by Discotek Media on December 27, 2022. The release is the first home video of the series in North America. Geneon USA's parent company, Dentsu, alongside Studio Pierrot, produced it and the previous Saiyuki anime projects.

GARDEN performed the opening theme title "Late-Show", which provided music for two Saiyuki RELOAD image albums. The original author, Kazuya Minekura, wrote the lyrics for the song, which summarizes the image of the work. The maxi single was released on April 25, 2007, and was distributed by Frontier Works. The ending theme is performed by three popular voice actors: Sanzo (Toshihiko Seki), Goku (Sōichirō Hoshi), and Gojyo (Hiroaki Hirata). They sing a dramatic moon-themed song in addition to two songs by Sanzo, Goku, and Gojyo from Saiyuki RELOAD Vocal Album re-recorded as a coupling. It also includes an a cappella version of the end theme "shiny moon". They also released an instrumental version, totaling five songs, and the maxi single was released on May 23, 2007.

== Plot ==
Twenty years ago, Koumyou Sanzo visited Zenkoji Temple, where Godai Sanzo resides. Godai Sanzo realizes that he is suffering from a serious illness and does not have much time left to live. In the presence of Koumyou, he elected a candidate for the official successor of Mutenkyomon, Kenmura, who objects to the selection and suppresses Godai to the floor. Then, on the day of the final exam, a crow cries out. Genjo Sanzo went to Shayoden to have an audience with the Sanbutsujin. He was looking for a clue to the Holy Heaven Sutra, but from the three Buddha gods, he was given a new life and will stay at Keiunin. There, he met Daisojo Makukaku but decided to leave again late at night. An opposition party aiming for Sanzo's life attacks Keiunin.

Mount Gogyo contains a monster that has been sealed for 500 years. When Sanzo climbs to the top, he meets a child. Sanzo takes him down the mountain and secretly lets him live in Keiunin. From the three Buddha gods, the children are legendary demons with powers equal to those of gods. He is told that he is the "Symbol of Chaos", Saiten Daisho Son Goku. That night, Goku was found by a monk and cornered. Gojyo and Hakkai are heretical beings who are neither human nor youkai. The two meet by chance and live together until Hakkai's injury heals. An old friend of Gojyo's, Enri, appears there for the first time in a year and invites Gojyo to team up with a band of thieves. A few days later, Enri becomes a prisoner after betraying the organization and asks Gojyo to take over the hostage while he steals the temple as his last job. Finally, the Sanzo party is assembled, and a new story that continues to the present is spun.

== Cast ==
Character	Japanese Voice actor
Genjo Sanzo	Toshihiko Seki
Son Goku	Sōichirō Hoshi
Cho Hakkai	Akira Ishida
Sha Gojyo	Hiroaki Hirata
Nii Jienyi (Ukoku Sanzo)	Hōchū Ōtsuka
Kouryuu (Young Sanzo)	Kahoru Sasajima
Jikaku	Katsuhisa Hōki
Kenyuu	Kohsuke Toriumi
Koumyou Sanzo	Mitsuru Miyamoto
Godai Sanzo	Takashi Taniguchi
Banri	Yasuyuki Kase

== Release ==
Saiyuki Reload: Burial (OAV) Special DVD-Box

The first volume of the Special Edition was released on April 27, 2007, and the special edition for volume two was released on September 28. The third was supposed to release on December 28, 2007, but due to production reasons, the volume of the special edition changed and was instead distributed on March 28, 2008. A special edition of all three volumes was published on February 7, 2008.

Volume 1, "Sanzo Chapter" (Standard Edition), was released on July 10, 2007. Volume 2, "Son Goku Chapter" (Standard Edition), was released on December 21, 2007, and Volume 3, "Gojyo & Hakkai Chapter" (Standard Edition), was released on May 23, 2008. On October 24, 2012, the Saiyuki Reload: Burial OVA special DVD-BOX was released by Frontier Works and Geneon. The Saiyuki Reload: Burial Genjo Sanzo action figure was released on October 25, 2008. A Blu-ray of all three volumes of Saiyuki Reload: Burial (OVA) was released on December 21, 2018.

Discotek Media released the three-episode OVA on Blu-ray disc on December 27, 2022.
