= Saiyuki (manga) =

Japanese manga series and its franchise

- Seventh tankōbon volume cover, featuring Genjo Sanzo (center), Son Goku (bottom), Sha Gojyo (right) and Cho Hakkai (left)

最遊記 (Saiyūki)
- Genre: Adventure; Fantasy
- Manga
- Written by: Kazuya Minekura
- Published by: Enix (1997–2002); Ichijinsha (2002–2015)
- English publisher: AUS: Madman Entertainment; NA: Tokyopop (formerly); Kodansha USA (current)
- Imprint: G Fantasy Comics
- Magazine: Monthly GFantasy
- Original run: February 18, 1997 – November 2001
- Volumes: 9
Further information
Original video animation
Saiyuki Premium
Directed by	Takashi Sogabe
Written by	Reiko Yoshida
Music by	Yuriko Nakamura
Studio	Tokyo Kids
Released	April 23, 1999 – February 5, 2000
Episodes	2
Light novel
Written by	Misagi Hijiri
Illustrated by	Kazuya Minekura
Published by	Enix (before 2002); Ichijinsha (after 2002)
Original run	April 1, 1999 – February 1, 2001
Volumes	3
- Sequels
- Saiyuki Reload (2002–09); Saiyuki Reload Blast (2009– )
- Prequels
- Saiyuki Gaiden (1999–09); Saiyuki Ibun (2009– )
- Anime television series
- Gensomaden Saiyuki (2000–2001)
- Anime film
- Saiyuki: Requiem (2001)
- Other
- List of Saiyuki light novels; List of Saiyuki video games; Saiyuki musicals
- icon

Saiyuki (Japanese: 最遊記, Hepburn: Saiyūki) is a Japanese manga series written and illustrated by Kazuya Minekura. It was originally serialized in Enix's Shōnen magazine Monthly GFantasy between February 1997 and November 2001, with its chapters collected in nine tankōbon volumes. It was later republished by Ichijinsha, which released a nine-volume edition with new covers from October 2002 to June 2003, followed by a five-volume bunkoban edition from April to August 2015. The story is loosely based on the 16th-century Chinese novel Journey to the West and follows the Buddhist priest Genjo Sanzo, who is tasked with traveling west with three yōkai companions to prevent the resurrection of Gyumao, an evil god.

The manga was licensed for an English release by Tokyopop, which published nine volumes between March and July, 2005. The most recent publication in North America is by Kodansha, the series receiving a hardcover release with a new translation between February 2020 and January 2021.

The original manga was followed by the sequels Saiyuki Reload and Saiyuki Reload Blast and the prequels Saiyuki Gaiden and Saiyuki Ibun. The series has spawned a media franchise that includes five anime television series. Pierrot produced the first, a 50-episode series titled Gensomaden Saiyuki, which aired from April 2000 to March 2001 and won the 23rd Animage Anime Grand Prix for best anime. Pierrot subsequently produced the anime film adaptation and the television sequels Saiyuki Reload and Saiyuki Reload Gunlock, which aired in 2003–2004. Platinum Vision produced Saiyuki Reload Blast in 2017, while Liden Films produced Saiyuki Reload: Zeroin in 2022. The franchise has also received several original video animation releases and stage adaptations, as well as novels, audio releases, video games, guidebooks, artbooks, and other media.

As of July 2017, the Saiyuki franchise has sold 25 million copies in circulation worldwide, making it one of the best-selling manga series of all time. The series has also received positive reviews and recognition for its characters, action, and reinterpretation of Journey to the West.

== Plot ==
Togenkyo, also known as Shangri-La, is a land where humans and yokai have lived in peace following generations of conflict. At the beginning of *Saiyuki*, this peace is threatened by an attempt to resurrect Gyumao, the yokai god. The resurrection ritual generates waves of negative energy that spread throughout Togenkyo, causing previously peaceful yokai to experience violent and uncontrollable urges. As the influence of the energy grows, increasing numbers of yokai begin attacking and killing humans.

In response to the crisis, the Buddhist Trinity dispatches one of the five Sanzo priests, sacred guardians of the world's five sutras, to investigate the disturbances and prevent Gyumao's resurrection. The mission is assigned to Genjo Sanzo, a high-ranking Buddhist priest whose cynical and abrasive personality contrasts sharply with the traditional image of a monk. He is ordered to travel westward and stop those responsible for the resurrection.

Sanzo is accompanied by three yokai who appear to be unaffected by the negative energy. Son Goku is a fifteen-year-old boy with a carefree personality, a voracious appetite, and a monkey-like appearance. Sha Gojyo is a womanizer, gambler, and heavy drinker with a rebellious temperament, while Cho Hakkai is a courteous and seemingly gentle man who conceals a violent past. Despite their contrasting personalities, the four gradually become a close-knit group as they continue their journey west.

As the travelers proceed, they encounter numerous yokai affected by the spreading corruption. During a brief stop in a village, they meet Shunrei, whose lover was a yokai. The encounter illustrates the growing distrust between humans and yokai. Gojyo also continues searching for his half-brother, Jien, who disappeared after saving Gojyo's life.

The group soon becomes the target of Kogaiji, the son of Gyumao and one of the principal figures involved in the resurrection. While Sanzo and his companions are resting at a bar, they are attacked by Yaone, a skilled herbalist who serves Kogaiji. Although the attack fails, Kogaiji subsequently begins pursuing the group himself, sending his followers to eliminate them.

Later, Sanzo and his companions discover a mountain of dead yokai. The killings are attributed to a monk known as "The Savior," who is eventually revealed to be Shuei, an incantation specialist whom Sanzo knew during his childhood. Shuei has been corrupted by an evil incantatory seal and has become convinced that all yokai must be destroyed. When he confronts the travelers, he attempts to kill Goku, Hakkai, and Gojyo because they are yokai. His attack instead gravely injures Sanzo.

Seeing Sanzo wounded causes Goku to lose control of himself. His diadem, which normally suppresses his immense yokai power, breaks, allowing his full strength to emerge. Goku enters a berserk state and begins destroying everything around him. The situation is eventually brought under control with the intervention of the goddess Kanzeon Bosatsu, who restores Goku's diadem and allows him to regain control of his power.

Meanwhile, at Hojo Castle, Lady Gyokumen is revealed to be one of the main figures coordinating Gyumao's resurrection. Frustrated by the repeated failures to eliminate Sanzo and his companions, she demands that stronger measures be taken. Ririn, Kogaiji's half-sister, subsequently decides to pursue the travelers herself.

The group's journey later brings them into conflict with Chin Yi-So, a fortune teller and yokai capable of summoning shikigami. Chin Yi-So has a particular hatred for Hakkai and refers to him by his former name, Cho Gono. His appearance forces Hakkai to confront the violent events that led him to abandon his former identity.

A flashback reveals that Hakkai was once known as Cho Gono. His life changed after his sister was offered as a sacrifice to the yokai lord Hyakugan Maoh. In retaliation, Gono slaughtered his entire village as well as numerous yokai. Hyakugan Maoh's son, Chin Yisou, used his blood to transform Gono into a yokai before eventually becoming a shikigami himself. He was later reborn as Chin Yi-So.

After escaping from Hyakugan Maoh's castle, Gono collapsed in a forest and waited to die. Gojyo discovered him after a night of drinking and saved his life, encouraging him to find a new purpose rather than remain consumed by his guilt. Gono eventually adopted the name Cho Hakkai in an attempt to distance himself from his past.

Hakkai and Gojyo later encountered Sanzo and Goku after the Buddhist Trinity sent Sanzo to locate Cho Gono. Because Gono had already abandoned that identity and become Hakkai, Sanzo considered the criminal he had been sent to find effectively dead. He instead accepted Hakkai and Gojyo as companions, and the three eventually continued traveling with Goku.

In the present, Chin Yi-So forces Hakkai to reveal his past to the others. Hakkai initially fears that Sanzo, Goku, and Gojyo will reject him after learning the truth. Instead, they reaffirm their loyalty to him and refuse to judge him solely on the basis of his past. After defeating Chin Yi-So, the group continues its journey. It is also revealed that Gojyo's missing half-brother, Jien, has become one of Kogaiji's assassins.

The travelers later infiltrate the hideout of a powerful desert yokai believed to possess one of the sacred sutras. During the confrontation, Sanzo is poisoned and collapses, while the resulting battle causes the yokai's underground lair to begin collapsing. Kogaiji arrives in time to rescue the group and subsequently challenges Goku to a duel for possession of the sacred sutra.

After escaping the collapsing hideout, Sanzo and his companions rest in a nearby town. While visiting the local market, Gojyo intervenes when he sees a young boy being attacked by a group of thugs. Their brief respite ends when Goku and Hakkai are captured inside a pocket dimension contained within a jar belonging to the yokai Kinkaku. The incident separates the group and leads to a confrontation with Kinkaku and his twin brother, Ginkaku.

During their encounters with the two yokai, the travelers learn of a mysterious and more powerful adversary who calls himself "God." Unlike their previous opponents, God appears to have a direct interest in the sacred sutras and the larger events surrounding Gyumao's resurrection. During the ensuing conflict, he succeeds in stealing one of the sutras. After escaping from his domain, Sanzo and his companions set out in pursuit of God in an attempt to recover it.

As the negative energy continues to spread throughout Togenkyo, the journey west becomes increasingly dangerous. Sanzo and his companions must contend with powerful enemies while confronting the consequences of their own pasts and attempting to prevent the sacred sutras from falling into the hands of those seeking to resurrect Gyumao and plunge Togenkyo into chaos.

== Production ==
Kazuya Minekura began conceiving and drawing Saiyuki while she was still in high school. The series was inspired by the Chinese novel Journey to the West. Minekura had enjoyed the 1978 Japanese television drama adaptation of the story, and watching Doraemon: The Record of Nobita's Parallel Visit to the West influenced her decision to create her own parody of Journey to the West.

The characters in Saiyuki contain original elements, although many of their basic settings follow those of their counterparts in Journey to the West. The outward personality traits of Sha Gojyo and Cho Hakkai, however, were reversed in comparison with the original work.

The series combines its Chinese-inspired fantasy setting with modern objects and references, including television, mahjong, canned beer, cigarettes, and credit cards. Contemporary popular culture and current trends are also referenced, contributing to the series' distinctive atmosphere. Minekura has described the work as a highly stylized reinterpretation of Journey to the West.

Minekura has also explained the title Saiyuki as meaning "the most playful Journey to the West", reflecting her approach to the source material.

== Development and influences ==
Contemporary Japanese descriptions of the manga identify the classical novel as its basis and specifically associate its principal characters with Genjō Sanzō, Son Gokū, Sha Gojō, and Cho Hakkai.

The published manga substantially changes the context in which those figures appear. Rather than reproducing the historical and religious framework of the classical novel, Minekura places counterparts of its travelers in a fantasy world in which humans and yōkai coexist. Japanese publisher and media descriptions consequently characterize Saiyuki as a fantasy work that makes a bold rearrangement of the Journey to the West material.

The reinterpretation also extended to the visual and thematic presentation of the travelers. Later Japanese descriptions of the series emphasize that Minekura's version presents the Journey to the West cast within a stylized fantasy road narrative, while retaining the identities and broad roles of the traditional travelers.

Minekura continued to revisit the source material and the characters' histories in subsequent works. Saiyuki Gaiden, for example, explores an earlier period in the same continuity, while Saiyuki Ibun focuses on the younger Kōmyō Sanzō, the teacher of Genjō Sanzō. These works expanded the fictional background associated with the characters originally derived from Journey to the West rather than functioning as direct adaptations of episodes from the classical novel.

Minekura later reflected on the development of the Saiyuki series in a long interview published in the October 2009 issue of Pafu. The feature reviewed Saiyuki and Saiyuki Reload, discussed the conclusion of Saiyuki Reload, and included Minekura's comments on the forthcoming Saiyuki Ibun and Saiyuki Reload Blast.

The documented development of Saiyuki therefore continued beyond the initial conception described above, with later works expanding the same fictional continuity through earlier periods and characters connected to the main series.

Music was another important influence on the series. Minekura has said that she develops the overall image of her works from the impression she receives from songs and singers she likes. For Saiyuki, the music of B'z was a major influence, particularly the album RUN. As a result, some chapter titles in the manga and episode titles in the television anime correspond to titles of B'z songs.

== Characterization and themes ==
Saiyuki substantially reinterprets the characters of Journey to the West, retaining their broad identities while giving Genjō Sanzō, Son Gokū, Cho Hakkai, and Sha Gojō distinct personalities, appearances, and relationships. Their differing personalities, shared histories, and painful pasts form much of the story's emotional focus, while the relationships among the four protagonists have also been examined through themes of masculinity, gender boundaries, fatherhood, and an unconventional male family structure. The manga also complicates conventional distinctions between humans and yōkai and between good and evil, while its protagonists' resistance to conventional expectations and determination to choose their own paths contribute to recurring themes of freedom and fate. Its darker tone combines violence and tragedy with humor, further distinguishing its reinterpretation of the classical story.

== Author ==
Kazuya Minekura developed Saiyuki as a reinterpretation of Journey to the West. A contemporary account of Minekura's comments on the series records that an early version was set in a school, where the principal characters were to perform a play based on Journey to the West, before the concept developed into the fantasy setting of the serialized manga.

Minekura continued to develop the series after the original Saiyuki serialization ended. Saiyuki Reload began publication in Monthly Comic Zero Sum in 2002, followed by Saiyuki Reload Blast, which began serialization in 2010.

Minekura also developed Saiyuki Gaiden, a related manga set 500 years before the events of the main story. The work was serialized separately from the main series and concluded in 2009.

Minekura discussed the development of the Saiyuki series in a long interview published in the October 2009 issue of Pafu. The feature reviewed the series, including Saiyuki Reload and Saiyuki Gaiden, and included Minekura's comments on the conclusion of Saiyuki Reload and her forthcoming Saiyuki projects.

The production of Saiyuki was also affected by Minekura's health. In September 2010, Comic Natalie reported that she had suspended her manga serialization indefinitely because of ill health. At the time, both Saiyuki Reload Blast and Saiyuki Ibun were affected, although she continued some irregular work, including illustrations and other projects related to the series.

The suspension was followed by the resumption of Saiyuki Reload Blast in 2012. Comic Natalie reported that Minekura had been unable to continue manga serialization since autumn 2010 because of her health, while continuing some illustration work, and that Saiyuki Reload Blast resumed with the May 2012 issue of Monthly Comic Zero-Sum.

Minekura's visual work for Saiyuki has also been collected separately. The salty-dog artbook series primarily collects illustrations from the Saiyuki series; its seventh volume includes the complete Saiyuki 12SEASONS illustration series originally published in Monthly Comic Zero-Sum, together with newly drawn material.

== Media ==
=== Manga ===
Art commemorating Saiyuki's 20th anniversary by Kazuya Minekura

The Saiyuki manga series consists of five related series by Kazuya Minekura. Its publication has periodically been interrupted or slowed because of the author's health. Minekura first published a one-shot of Saiyuki in Square Enix's shōnen manga magazine Monthly GFantasy in the September 1996 issue, released in August of that year. (Note: The one-shot was released in the September 1996 issue (cover date September 1), released in August 1996 of that same year.) Saiyuki began regular serialization in the magazine six months later. (Note: The series began in the magazine's third issue of 1997 (cover date March 1), corresponding to GFantasy Vol. 5, No. 3 (Issue 48). Contemporary official and reliable sources state that the issue was released on February 18, 1997.) The original series concluded in the December 2001 issue of Monthly GFantasy. (Note: The final chapter appeared in the magazine's twelfth issue of 2001 (cover date December 1), corresponding to GFantasy Vol. 9, No. 13 (Issue 111).) It was collected in nine tankōbon volumes, published by Enix between 1997 and 2002.

The series was licensed in North America by Tokyopop, which published an English-language edition in nine volumes from 2004 to 2005. In 2019, Kodansha USA announced a new license for the series; its edition was released in both print and digital formats in 2020–2021.

Minekura later changed publishers from Enix to Ichijinsha, which republished the original series with redesigned covers from October 2002 to June 2003. Ichijinsha subsequently released the series in a five-volume bunkoban edition from April to August 2015.

==== Sequels ====
Saiyuki Reload began serialization in Ichijinsha's josei manga magazine Monthly Comic Zero Sum in March 2002. The series concluded in June 2009 and was collected in ten volumes.

The final main series, Saiyuki Reload Blast, began serialization in Monthly Comic Zero Sum in December 2009. Publication was interrupted several times because of Minekura's health. The series went on hiatus in September 2010 and resumed in March 2012. It entered another hiatus in 2016 and resumed in 2019 after an 18-month break.

Its first volume was published in 2012, followed by the second in 2014 and the third in 2017.

A one-shot spinoff related to the series was also drawn by Ritsuhiro Mikami in January 2021.

==== Prequels ====
Saiyuki Gaiden, a prequel to the main series, began serialization in Monthly GFantasy in May 1999. Following Minekura's move from Enix to Ichijinsha, the series continued in Monthly Comic Zero Sum beginning with its November 2003 issue. It concluded in May 2009 and was collected in four volumes.

Saiyuki Ibun began serialization in Ichijinsha's Comic Zero Sum WARD in September 2009. After a 28-month hiatus, serialization resumed in November 2012. One collected volume was published in April 2013, after which the series entered an indefinite hiatus.

=== Anime ===
Cover art of the first Gensomaden Saiyuki Complete DVD-Box

The Saiyuki manga has been adapted into five television anime series, a theatrical film, and several original video animation (OVA) releases. The television series are Gensomaden Saiyuki (2000–2001), Saiyuki Reload (2003–2004), Saiyuki Reload Gunlock (2004), Saiyuki Reload Blast (2017), and Saiyuki Reload: Zeroin (2022).

The first animated adaptation of Saiyuki was a two-volume original video animation (OVA) produced by Tokyo Kids. Takashi Sogabe directed the OVA, with Reiko Yoshida writing the scripts. Kazuya Minekura was credited with the original work and supervision, while Yoshihiro Hosaka served as planner and Takashi Kikuchi as producer.

The two OVA volumes were released between December 1999 and February 2000. The OVA preceded the television series Gensomaden Saiyuki, which began broadcasting in Japan in April 2000.

The OVA was later released on home video under the Saiyuki Premium Box branding. The first documented Premium Box DVD was issued by Pioneer LDC on February 25, 2000, under catalog number ENBA-1151. The release contains one 30-minute OVA episode and includes a sleeve case and two booklets.

An official guidebook, Saiyuki Official Guide (最遊記オフィシャルガイド), was published in June 2000. The 96-page book has ISBN 978-4-7575-0239-0. A contemporary account described it as a collection of OVA setting materials and reported that it contained an interview with Minekura concerning the development of Saiyuki.

The first television series, Gensomaden Saiyuki, was produced by Studio Pierrot and aired from April 2000 to March 2001. It consisted of 50 episodes.

A theatrical film, Saiyuki: Requiem, was released in Japan on August 18, 2001. It was produced by Studio Pierrot and directed by Hayato Date. ADV Films licensed the film for release in North America.

The second television series, Saiyuki Reload, was produced by Studio Pierrot and aired from October 2, 2003, to March 25, 2004. It consisted of 25 episodes.

The third television series, Saiyuki Reload Gunlock, was produced by Studio Pierrot and aired from April to September 2004. It consisted of 26 episodes.

Studio Pierrot produced Saiyuki Reload: Burial, a three-episode OVA based on the "Burial" arc of the Saiyuki Reload manga. It was released in three DVD volumes.

In 2011, Saiyuki Gaiden, a prequel manga written and illustrated by Kazuya Minekura, was adapted into a three-volume OVA.

The fourth television series, Saiyuki Reload Blast, was produced by Studio Pierrot and aired from July to September 2017. It consisted of 12 episodes.

In January 2021, Liden Films announced an anime television adaptation of the "Even a Worm" arc of the Saiyuki Reload manga. Saiyuki Reload: Zeroin was directed by Misato Takada, with series composition by Michiko Yokote and Aya Matsui. Noriko Ogura designed the characters and served as chief animation director, while Yūsuke Shirato composed the music. The principal Japanese voice cast from the previous television anime returned for the series.

Saiyuki Reload: Zeroin aired from January 6 to March 31, 2022, and consisted of 13 episodes. It was broadcast on AT-X, Tokyo MX, MBS, and BS11.

Sentai Filmworks licensed Saiyuki Reload: Zeroin outside Asia, while Muse Communication licensed the series in South and Southeast Asia.

The English dub of Saiyuki Reload: Zeroin began streaming on HIDIVE on February 24, 2022.

== Stage adaptations ==
Promotional key visual for Saiyuki Kagekiden, featuring Hiroki Suzuki as Genjo Sanzo, Taizo Shiina as Son Goku, Taiyo Ayukawa as Sha Gojyo, and Yuki Fujiwara as Cho Hakkai.

The Saiyuki manga has been adapted into a long-running series of Japanese stage musicals under the title Saiyuki Kagekiden (最遊記歌劇伝). The series began with Saiyuki Kagekiden: Go to the West in 2008 and subsequently expanded to include productions based on Saiyuki, Saiyuki Reload, Saiyuki Ibun, and Saiyuki Gaiden. The productions have adapted both the main storyline and stories set before the events of the main series.

The first production, Saiyuki Kagekiden: Go to the West, was performed at Tennoz Galaxy Theatre in Tokyo from September 13 to 21, 2008. Hiroki Suzuki portrayed Genjo Sanzo, with Taizo Shiina as Son Goku, Atsushi Maruyama as Sha Gojyo, and Ryuji Sainei as Cho Hakkai. A second production, Saiyuki Kagekiden: Dead or Alive, followed in 2009 and retained the principal cast of the first production.

After a hiatus of approximately five years, the stage series resumed in 2014 with Saiyuki Kagekiden: God Child. The production was staged at Zenrosai Hall/Space Zero in Tokyo from May 2 to 7, 2014, and adapted the Kinkaku and Ginkaku and Kami-sama storylines from volumes 6 through 9 of the manga. Kaori Miura wrote and directed the production. Hiroki Suzuki, Taizo Shiina, Taiyo Ayukawa, and Yuki Fujiwara portrayed Genjo Sanzo, Son Goku, Sha Gojyo, and Cho Hakkai, respectively.

The revival continued with Saiyuki Kagekiden: Burial in 2015, followed later that year by Saiyuki Kagekiden: Reload. Burial adapted the manga's Burial storyline, while Reload was based on Saiyuki Reload. The latter again featured Hiroki Suzuki, Taizo Shiina, Taiyo Ayukawa, and Yuki Fujiwara as the four members of Sanzo's group, with Ryunosuke Onoda returning as Kougaiji.

In 2018, Saiyuki Kagekiden: Ibun was staged at Tokyo Dome City's Theatre G-Rosso from September 4 to 9. Based on Kazuya Minekura's Saiyuki Ibun, the production takes place before the main Saiyuki story and focuses on characters associated with the training and succession of the Sanzo priesthood. Miura wrote and directed the production, which featured a new principal cast for the prequel storyline.

The series then adapted the Hazel Arc through Saiyuki Kagekiden: Darkness (2019), Saiyuki Kagekiden: Oasis (2020), and Saiyuki Kagekiden: Sunrise (2021). The three productions were written and directed by Miura. Darkness introduced Hazel Grouse and Gato into the stage series, while Oasis continued their storyline. Sunrise, performed in Osaka and Tokyo in February 2021, was presented as the final chapter of the Hazel Arc.

In 2023, the stage series returned with Saiyuki Kagekiden: Gaiden, based on Saiyuki Gaiden, a prequel to the main story. The production was staged at Shinagawa Prince Hotel Stellar Ball in Tokyo from September 29 to October 12, 2023, and at COOL JAPAN PARK OSAKA WW Hall from October 19 to 23. Several performers from earlier productions returned in roles from the Gaiden storyline, including Hiroki Suzuki as Konzen Doji, Taizo Shiina as Goku, Yuki Hirai as Kenren Taisho, and Yuki Fujiwara as Tenpou Gensui. The additional principal cast included Ryo Kitamura as Nataku Taishi, Hiroki Sana as Ao Run, Masashi Yamazaki as Ritoten, Shungo Takasaki as Kanzeon Bosatsu, and Ujisuke as Jiroshin.

The stage series has continued to expand the Saiyuki franchise beyond its original manga storyline, with productions covering the main journey, character backstories, prequel stories, and later arcs. A detailed production history, including individual performances, casts, staff, and releases, is covered in the main article on the stage series.

=== Other media ===
==== Novels ====
Several prose novels based on Saiyuki were published by Enix under its G Fantasy Novels imprint. The first, Saiyuki: Kaen no Zanmu (最遊記 華焔の残夢), was written by Hijiri Misagi and illustrated by Kazuya Minekura. It was published in April 1999 as the first volume of the Saiyuki novel series.

The second novel, Saiyuki 2: Kyoka Suigetsu (最遊記〈2〉鏡花水月), was published in April 2000, followed by Saiyuki 3: Rasen no Koyomi (最遊記〈3〉螺旋の暦) in February 2001. Both were written by Misagi and illustrated by Minekura.

A separate novelization of the 2001 animated film, Saiyuki: Requiem – Requiem for the Chosen Ones (劇場版 幻想魔伝最遊記―選ばれざる者への鎮魂歌), was written by Hio Kosaka and published by Enix in October 2001. CiNii identifies the book as a novelization of the film and records it as a G Fantasy Novels publication.

==== Audio releases ====
The franchise was expanded through a line of drama CDs. Frontier Works states that 19 Saiyuki drama CDs released between 1999 and 2012 were collected in the 2019 box set Saiyuki Drama CD Premium Collection. The collection includes releases spanning the original Saiyuki period and later material through Noisy.

The audio line included adaptations of manga material as well as original drama. For example, Frontier Works describes Saiyuki Reload -burial- as a drama CD based on the Burial arc of the original manga; the release was issued in December 2007 as part of the Comic Zero-Sum CD Collection.

Earlier audio adaptations were also released as the three-volume G Fantasy Comic CD Collection. The National Diet Library catalogs Saiyuki v.1: Kaen no Zanmu as a recorded-media release from April 2000, Saiyuki v.2: Kyoka Suigetsu from November 2000, and Saiyuki v.3: Rasen no Koyomi from April 2001.

==== Video games ====
Several video games were released under the Gensomaden Saiyuki name during and after the original anime's run. Gensomaden Saiyuki: Sabaku no Shishin (幻想魔伝最遊記 ～砂漠の四神～) was released for the Game Boy on March 23, 2001. Famitsu lists it as a role-playing game and identifies J-Wing as its manufacturer.

Gensomaden Saiyuki Retribution: Hi no Ataru Basho de (幻想魔伝最遊記 Retribution ～陽のあたる場所で～) was released for the WonderSwan on June 7, 2001. Famitsu classifies it as a board game.

A PlayStation adventure game, Gensomaden Saiyuki: Harukanaru Nishi e (幻想魔伝 最遊記 ～遥かなる西へ～), was released by J-Wing on December 26, 2002.

Games continued during the Saiyuki Reload period. Bandai released the PlayStation 2 game Saiyuki Reload on March 18, 2004, while Saiyuki Reload Gunlock was released for the PlayStation 2 in August 2004.

==== Guidebooks ====
Enix published Saiyuki Official Guide (最遊記オフィシャルガイド) in June 2000. The 96-page book has ISBN 978-4-7575-0239-0. The guide contains reference material relating to the series, including material associated with the OVA, and an interview with Minekura.

==== Artbooks ====
Kazuya Minekura's artwork has been collected in the salty-dog series of artbooks published by Ichijinsha. The series is not devoted exclusively to Saiyuki, but several volumes contain material from the franchise, including illustrations associated with Saiyuki Gaiden, Saiyuki Reload, Saiyuki Reload Blast, and Saiyuki Ibun.

Ichijinsha also published Saiyuki Series Reproduction Art Collection (最遊記シリーズ複製原画集), a collection of color reproductions from Minekura's Saiyuki works.

==== 25th anniversary ====
The 25th anniversary of the Saiyuki manga was commemorated with Saiyuki Festa 2022, held on April 2–3, 2022. The second day included a stage event featuring members of the anime's voice cast.

A commemorative original-art exhibition, Saiyuki 25th EXHIBITION, was subsequently held in several Japanese cities. The Osaka exhibition ran from December 30, 2022, to January 15, 2023; the Tokyo exhibition from May 12 to May 28, 2023; and the Fukuoka exhibition from August 11 to September 3, 2023. A later Miyagi venue was also added to the exhibition tour.

The exhibition displayed more than 200 original manuscripts and color illustrations selected by Minekura, together with rough drawings and examples of the artist's working materials.

An official exhibition pamphlet was also published, reproducing exhibited manga manuscripts and accompanying commentary by Minekura.

== Reception ==
=== Sales and popularity ===
Characters from Saiyuki have remained popular subjects for cosplay features in Japan.

Saiyuki became a major hit during its serialization in G Fantasy, particularly among female readers, and established Kazuya Minekura as a popular manga creator. By the time of the release of the first six collected volumes, the series had sold more than 3.2 million copies.

The series is a reinterpretation of the Chinese literary classic Journey to the West and follows four main characters on their journey through a fictionalized version of China.

Saiyuki also performed strongly in reader popularity surveys. In 1999, the manga ranked among popular serialized works in reader voting and placed highly in Puff magazine's popularity rankings for long-form manga.

The series also became one of the notable titles in the early English-language manga market. During the expansion of translated manga publishing in North America, Saiyuki was listed among Tokyopop's anticipated manga releases in 2004. The series appeared in ICv2's manga market reports, ranking among notable manga properties in 2003 and appearing among the top-performing shōjo manga titles tracked by the website in 2004.

Individual volumes of the English-language release also achieved notable rankings. Saiyuki volume 6 reached the top position in ICv2's list of best-selling manga in January 2005, while volume 8 ranked among Tokyopop's best-selling manga titles in June 2005.

In July 2017, the Saiyuki manga series surpassed 25 million copies in worldwide circulation.

The manga has maintained a dedicated readership decades after its debut. Its 25th-anniversary exhibition, held in 2022–2023, featured more than 200 original manuscripts and color illustrations selected by Kazuya Minekura and was held in multiple Japanese cities.

The continued popularity of its characters has also been reflected through recurring cosplay features in Japan.

=== Critical response ===
==== Manga ====
Saiyuki received generally positive reviews from manga critics, who highlighted Kazuya Minekura's reinterpretation of the classical Chinese novel Journey to the West, the series' character-driven narrative, and its combination of action, comedy, and darker dramatic themes. Reviewers frequently identified the relationships among Genjō Sanzo, Son Goku, Sha Gojyo, and Cho Hakkai as one of the manga's main strengths, while noting that Minekura's version modernized the original legend through contemporary elements and a greater focus on character conflicts.

In his reviews of the first three volumes, Eduardo M. Chavez of AnimeOnDVD described Saiyuki as an entertaining and successful reimagining of Journey to the West, highlighting its balance of action, humor, and an engaging cast. He particularly noted the chemistry between the four protagonists. While he criticized some inconsistency in Minekura's artwork in the second volume, he emphasized the strength of the character interactions, the series' dark yet humorous atmosphere, and its combination of traditional mythology with modern concepts. He also noted that the third volume expanded the emotional depth of the characters and further developed the bonds within Sanzo's group.

Other critics similarly focused on Minekura's approach to adapting the classic tale. Jeanne of Aestheticism.com highlighted the manga's creative reconstruction of Journey to the West, energetic artwork, and fast-paced storytelling, while Maria Lin of Animefringe.com emphasized its distinctive artwork and balance between humorous and darker themes. Manga-News similarly highlighted the charismatic cast and the way Minekura gave the classic legend a modern identity, with later reviews focusing on the development of the characters and the increasingly complex relationships between allies and enemies.

European reviewers also responded positively to the series. Manga Sanctuary praised Saiyuki for its atmosphere, artwork, action scenes, and memorable characters, while Chris936 described it as an engaging reinterpretation of a classic story. Michelle Smith of Soliloquy in Blue noted that the first three volumes became more compelling as the story progressed due to their character development. Irene Salzmann of Splash Comics praised the humor and cast of the early volumes while criticizing issues with the German translation; later reviews highlighted the series' mixture of historical influences and modern elements. Manga Xanadu similarly emphasized the strength of the protagonists and the character-focused narrative.

Some reviewers offered more mixed assessments. Sara of The Graphic Library praised Minekura's detailed character designs and costume work but criticized aspects of the artwork, setting, and limited development of female characters. Lisa Shea of Lisa Reviews criticized the series for relying heavily on stylish presentation and violence rather than deeper storytelling, arguing that its reinterpretation of Journey to the West lacked narrative depth. However, both reviewers acknowledged the series' distinctive visual identity and appeal.

The release of the Saiyuki: The Original Series Resurrected Edition was also positively received. Anime UK News described the re-release as a welcome return of an influential manga, highlighting its energetic storytelling, distinctive artwork, compelling characters, and balance between comedy, action, and darker emotional themes.
