= Genjo Sanzo =

Fictional character from Saiyuki

- Saiyuki character
- Genjo Sanzo as drawn by Minekura Kazuya
- Created by: Minekura Kazuya
- Voiced by: Wataru Takagi (Japanese, OVA); Toshihiko Seki (Japanese, original TV series); David Matranga (English); Lex Lang (English, Reload and Reload Gunlock)

In-universe information
- Aliases: Konzen Douji; Kouryuu
- Species: Human
- Gender: Male
- Title(s): Genjo Sanzo, the 31st of China
- Occupation: Expert martial artist; Expert marksmen
- Weapon: Maten Sutra; S&W M36; S&W M36
- Relatives: Rin Toku (father); Kouran (mother); Koumyou Sanzo (adoptive father/guardian); Son Goku (ward)

Genjo Sanzo (Japanese: 玄奘三蔵, Hepburn: Genjō Sanzō) or Genjyo Sanzo is a fictional character in the manga and anime series Saiyuki. He is one of the four protagonists, loosely based on (or inspired by) the character Tang Sanzang.

== Background ==
Cover of the third volume of Saiyuki Gaiden, depicting Konzen Dōji, the character's earlier incarnation.

"Konzen Douji" was the first incarnation of Genjo Sanzo. Additionally he wore a god-forged golden coronet, a power limiter, to curb more than just his brute strength. He shows the personality traits of someone who is quick to explode into fits of temper when bothered and also a surprising father-like gentleness and kindness with Goku that no one would have expected.

When "Dr. Ni Jianyi" tell him his father was a government official named Rin Tokou, a political activist who was exiled to Oujyouin in Rishyu, the northern-most town of "Togenkyo". He was 51 years old when he met Sanzo's mother, a woman named "Kouran". She was 17 years of age and the daughter of a shop peddler. After he was conceived, his father went missing and his mother went off into the wilderness to bear the child alone. She died shortly after.

== Personality ==
Sanzo is a 23-year-old Buddhist priest and one of the five highest-ranking priests in Tougenkyo. He is searching for the stolen Maten Sutra, which belonged to his mentor and father figure, Priest Koumyou Sanzo, who was killed by a group of yokai during Sanzo's youth. Despite his position, Sanzo does not devote himself to Buddhist practice and drinks, smokes and gambles. He is portrayed as egotistical, competitive and selfish, but also as perceptive, composed and charismatic. He carries a handgun and also uses the Maten Sutra and a paper fan as weapons. His frequently used expressions include "Die" and "I'll kill you".

He is the current holder of the Sanzo title and the wielder of very powerful sutras, though he is usually content to keep those stored away and shoot people immediately. He met his trio of party members through various traumatic adventures and brought them together, offering them a chance to start over. Despite his grouchy exterior, he is revealed to be a good person at heart.

== Reception ==
=== Cultural impact ===
Genjo Sanzo is a popular character with fans, in 2000, the Character won the Best Male Character award at the 23rd Anime Grand Prix. In August 2001, issue of Newtype Magazine listed their top to anime titles. Gensomaden Saiyuki was ranked ninth, and Genjo Sanzo, in the top ten male characters, was ranked sixth. In June 2004, on the 26th Anime Grand Prix Award, Saiyuki Reload was in the top ten Anime titles, It was ranked fourth, Meanwhile Genjo Sanzo was ranked seventh at the top ten Best Male Characters. in 2005, on 27th Anime Grand Prix Award, Genjo Sanzo was the top of twenty best Male Character. It was ranked thirteenth. In August 2011, Genjo Sanzo character ranked fifth on Sina website's poll of top 10 favorite characters "who smoke" collected 754 votes from total of 8865 votes.

In 2013, he was ranked 36th on ComicsAlliance's 50 Sexiest Male Characters in Comics list. In January 2020, Genjo Sanzo character ranked eighth on AnimeAnime website's poll of top 10 favorite characters "that look good with cigarettes". In June 2022, "nijimen" anime news site, ranking top 10 popular characters played by Toshihiko Seki, Genjo Sanzo character was ranked second. In September 2022, "nlab.itmedia" ranking top 30 popular TV anime characters played by voice actor Toshihiko Seki, The first place is decided by Saiyuki's "Genjo Sanzo" collected 473 votes from total of 3176 votes. In January 2023, Genjo Sanzo character ranked third on AnimeAnime website's poll of top 20 favorite "monk" characters.

=== Critical response ===
Eduardo M. Chavez of Anime on DVD stating "the fact that sanzo could accept going into battle with someone who was once close to him shows responsibility to his mission and to himself. He could have waited and risked his friends getting caught up in the violence. Instead, he took on the challenge, as difficult as it was, and faced it aware that he will always have the memories of a better time and that nothing will be able to take them away". Sarah of Anime UK News finds in the character of Sanzo an irresistible charm and described the deep sense of camaraderie between the heroes convincingly and truly affecting. Aestheticism.com states that Sanzo is clearly a problematic character who preaches non-attachment to the past. they described the character as a cold loner, selfish, grumpy, an emotional mess, and a visionary leader and charismatic personality who draws others to him.

== See also ==
- List of Saiyuki characters
- Journey to the West
- List of Journey to the West characters
