= Seung-jun =

- Hangul: 승준
- RR: Seungjun
- MR: Sŭngjun
- IPA: [sɯŋdʑun]

Seung-jun, also spelled Seung-joon, or Sung-jun, Sung-joon, is a Korean given name.

== People ==
People with this name include:

Entertainers

- Kim Seung-jun (voice actor) (born 1967), South Korean voice actor
- Lee Seung-joon (actor, born 1973), South Korean actor
- Lee Seung-joon (actor, born 1978), South Korean actor
- Yoo Seung-jun (born 1976), South Korean singer

Sportspeople

- Lee Seung-jun (basketball) (born 1978), American-born South Korean basketball player
- Song Seung-jun (born 1980), South Korean baseball player
- Son Seung-joon (born 1982), South Korean football defender (K-League Classic)
- Kim Seung-jun (footballer) (born 1994), South Korean football forward (K-League Classic)
- Ha Seung-joon (born 1998), South Korean football defender (Belgian First Division B)

== See also ==
- List of Korean given names
