= Kim Seung-jun (voice actor) =

South Korean voice actor

Kim Seung-jun 김승준
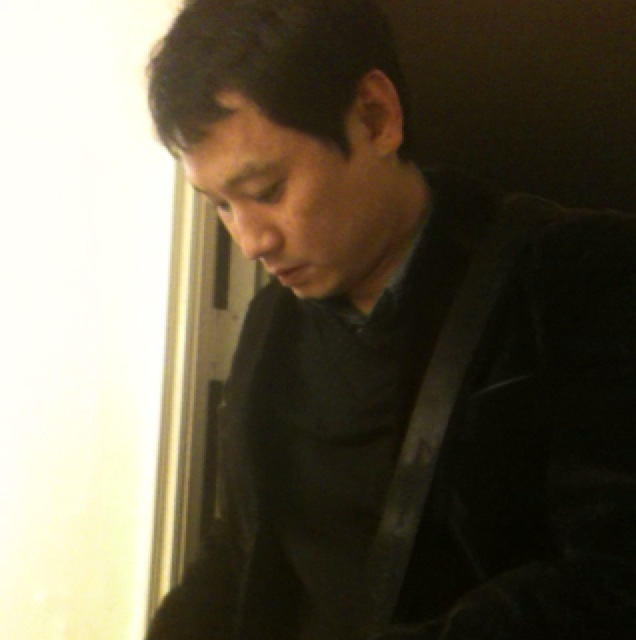
- Kim in 2012
- Born: 김승준; October 17, 1967 (age 58); Seoul, South Korea
- Other name: Wang-ja-nim
- Education: Seoul Institute of the Arts; Broadcasting and Entertainment
- Occupation: Voice actor
- Years active: 1990–present

Korean name
- Hangul: 김승준
- RR: Gim Seungjun
- MR: Kim Sŭngjun
- Website: Official fan club (in Korean)

Kim Seung-jun (Korean: 김승준; born October 17, 1967) is a South Korean voice actor born and raised in Seoul, South Korea.

In 1990, he debuted as a voice actor by joining Korean Broadcasting System's Voice Acting Division.

In the late 1990s, Kim shot to stardom with voicing Zelgadis Greywords on Slayers and Kaede Rukawa on Slam Dunk. Since then, he has voiced leading roles in a variety of animated works including Pet Shop of Horrors, His and Her Circumstances, Saiyuki, Fruits Basket, The Prince of Tennis, Detective School Q and Demon King from Today!. For movie fans, he is well recognized for covering film stars such as Brad Pitt, Christian Bale, Cillian Murphy, Johnny Depp, Leslie Cheung, Matt Damon and Stephen Chow. Kim also dubbed Saladin on a 1999 South Korean role-playing video game The War of Genesis III.

Kim is best known for his voicing SpongeBob SquarePants on the Korean (EBS) dub of SpongeBob SquarePants, Sesshomaru on the Korean dub of InuYasha, Roronoa Zoro on the Korean dub of a Japanese television animation series One Piece, the Tenth Doctor on the Korean dub of a British science fiction television series Doctor Who and more recently, Captain Marvelous on the Korean dub of Kaizoku Sentai Gokaiger.

== Asides ==
He currently teaches students at Soundist Academy (사운디스트아카데미; formerly Cheonyuzon (천유존)), a voice actor academy. Jeong Jae-heon and Hong Beom-gi were some of the students who received his teachings. Because his teaching method is strict, as befits a Republic of Korea Marine Corps background, he is considered a tiger teacher among his students. Chung Misook mentioned him in <더빙의 신> that he is famous for being strict even with her juniors.

== Career ==
=== Voice acting ===
==== TV animation dubbing ====
===== A =====
- Animal Detective Kiruminzoo (쥬로링 동물탐정, KBS)
  - Pulse Ryūdō (Ruth on the Korean TV edition)
  - Taizo Sanders (Akori on the Korean TV edition)
  - Tatsurou Komusubi (Mr. Stumpy on the Korean TV edition)

===== B =====
- Being Ian (꿈을 찍는 이안, EBS)
  - Ian Kelley
- Black Cat (블랙 캣, Animax)
  - Train Heartnet
- Blood+ (블러드 플러스, Animax)
  - Hagi

===== C =====
- Le Chevalier D'Eon (슈발리에, Animax)
  - D'Eon de Beaumont
- Cooking Master Boy (요리왕 비룡, KBS)
  - Leon (Il-seok on the Korean TV edition)
  - Shouan (Jang-poong on the Korean TV edition)
- Cowboy Bebop (Tooniverse)
  - Grencia Mars Elijah Guo Eckener
- Curious George (호기심 많은 조지, EBS)
  - The Man with the Yellow Hat
- Curious Play (환상게임, Tooniverse)
  - Tamahome (Yoo-gui on the Korean TV edition)

===== D =====
- The Daughter of Twenty Faces (20면상의 아가씨, Animax)
  - Twenty Faces
- Demon King from Today! (오늘부터 마왕!, Animax)
  - Wolfram von Bielefeld
- Detective Conan (명탐정 코난, Animax/KBS/Tooniverse)
  - Harley Hartwell (Ha In-seong on the Animax/KBS edition)
  - Makoto Okuda (Ock Tae-seong) on the episodes "Murderer, Shinichi Kudo" and "Shinichi's True Face and Ran's Tears" (on the Tooniverse edition)
- Detective School Q (탐정학원 Q, Tooniverse)
  - Ryū Amakusa
- Dragon (내 친구 드래곤, EBS)
  - Beaver
- Dragon Ball (드래곤볼, SBS)
  - Yamcha
- Dragon Ball Z (드래곤볼 Z, SBS)
  - Yamcha
- Dragon Ball Z Kai (드래곤볼 Z 카이, Champ TV)
  - Vegeta

===== F =====
- The Fairly OddParents (별난 깜찍 수호천사, EBS)
  - Cosmo (Byeol-nan on the Korean TV edition)
- Fruits Basket (후르츠 바스켓, AniOne TV)
  - Yuki Sohma (Song Yoo-jin on the Korean TV edition)
- Futari wa Pretty Cure (빛의 전사 프리큐어, SBS)
  - Pisard
  - Shougo Fujimura (Noh Yoo-cheon on the Korean TV edition)
- Future GPX Cyber Formula (영광의 레이서, KBS)
  - Asurada (Unicorn on the Korean TV edition)
  - Knight Shoemach

===== H =====
- His and Her Circumstances (그 남자 그 여자, Tooniverse)
  - Soichiro Arima (Ji Seong-jun on the Korean TV edition)
- Honey and Clover (허니와 클로버, Animax)
  - Takumi Mayama

===== I =====
- InuYasha (이누야샤, Champ TV)
  - Sesshomaru

===== L =====
- The Legend of the Legendary Heroes (마법전사 라이너, KBS)
  - Sion Astal
- Legendz (용의 전설 레전더, SBS)
  - Bruno Sparks
  - Shiron the Windragon

===== M =====
- Magi: The Labyrinth of Magic (마기, Cartoon Network Korea)
  - Sinbad
- My Little Pony: Friendship Is Magic (마이리틀포니, Tooniverse)
  - Time Turner/Doctor Whooves

===== N =====
- Nurse Angel Ririka SOS (리리카 SOS, KBS)
  - Kanon

===== O =====
- One Piece (원피스, AniOne TV/Champ TV/KBS/Tooniverse)
  - Roronoa Zoro
- Origami Warriors (접지전사, SBS)
  - Hyeon Dal-gook

===== P =====
- Patlabor (기동경찰 패트레이버, Tooniverse)
  - Asuma Shinohara (Baek Jeong-woo on the Korean TV edition)
- Pet Shop of Horrors (펫샵 오브 호러즈, Tooniverse)
  - Count D
- Powerpuff Girls Z (파워퍼프걸 Z, Cartoon Network Korea)
  - Professor Utonium
- The Prince of Tennis (테니스의 왕자, SBS)
  - Shusuke Fuji (Yoo Jin on the Korean TV edition)

===== S =====
- Saiyuki (환상마전 최유기, AniOne TV)
  - Cho Hakkai (Pal-gye on the Korean TV edition)
- Saiyuki Reload Gunlock (최유기 Reload Gunlock, Tooniverse)
  - Cho Hakkai (Pal-gye on the Korean TV edition)
- Scryed (스크라이드, Tooniverse)
  - Ryuho
- SD Gundam Sangokuden Brave Battle Warriors (SD 건담 삼국전, Champ TV)
  - Sousou Gundam
- Shōnen Onmyōji (소년 음양사, Animax)
  - Rikugō
- Slam Dunk (슬램덩크, SBS)
  - Kaede Rukawa (Seo Tae-woong on the Korean TV edition)
- Slayers (슬레이어즈, SBS)
  - Zelgadis Greywords
- SpongeBob SquarePants (네모네모 스펀지송, EBS)
  - SpongeBob SquarePants (SpongeSong on the Korean TV edition)
- The Story of Saiunkoku (채운국 이야기, Animax)
  - Seiran Shi (Ja Jeong-ran on the Korean TV edition)
- Sugar Sugar Rune (슈가슈가 룬, Tooniverse)
  - Pierre Tempête de Neige

===== T =====
- Thomas & Friends (꼬마 기관차 토마스와 친구들, EBS)
  - All the characters (from March 2006 until February 2011)
  - The Mayor of Sodor (since February 2011)
  - The Storyteller (since March 2006)
- A Town Called Panic (우당탕 마을, EBS)
  - Cowboy
- The Twelve Kingdoms (12국기, AniOne TV)
  - Keiki
- Twin Spica (트윈 스피카, Tooniverse)
  - Mr. Lion

===== V =====
- VeggieTales (야채극장 베지테일, EBS)
  - Larry the Cucumber
- Viva Piñata (비바 피냐타, Animax)
  - Franklin Fizzlybear

===== W =====
- Wedding Peach (사랑의 천사 웨딩피치, SBS)
  - Yousuke Fuuma (Kevin on the Korean TV edition)
- Whistle! (내일은 축구왕, Animax)
  - Tatsuya Mizuno (Kim Min-cheol on the Korean TV edition)

===== Y =====
- Yu-Gi-Oh! Duel Monsters (유희왕, SBS)
  - Ryota Kajiki (Ma Hae-ryong on the Korean TV edition)
  - Ryuji Otogi (Duke on the Korean TV edition)
- Yu-Gi-Oh! 5D's (유희왕 5D's, Champ TV)
  - Jack Atlas

==== Animated movie dubbing ====
===== 1990s =====
Year	Title	Role	Notes
1995	Pocahontas (포카혼타스)	Thomas	
1996	The Hunchback of Notre Dame (노틀담의 꼽추)	Quasimodo	
1998	The Lion King 2 (라이온 킹 2)	Simba	
1998	The Prince of Egypt (이집트 왕자)	Moses	
1999	Tarzan (타잔)	Tarzan	
1999	Toy Story 2 (토이 스토리 2)	Sheriff Woody	

===== 2000s =====
Year	Title	Role	Notes
2000	The Road to El Dorado (엘 도라도)	Miguel	
2002	Spirit: Stallion of the Cimarron (스피릿)	Little Creek	
2003	Balto (발토)	Balto	The Korean TV edition broadcast on SBS
2004	Brother Bear (브라더 베어)	Kenai	
2004	Garfield: The Movie (가필드)	Breckin Meyer as Jon Arbuckle	
2004	Blade of the Phantom Master (신 암행어사)	Yuite	
2006	Brother Bear 2 (브라더 베어 2)	Kenai	
2006	Chicken Little (치킨 리틀)	Chicken Little Cluck	
2006	Over the Hedge (헷지)	Hammy	He voiced RJ on the Korean TV edition broadcast on KBS.
2006	Shrek 2 (슈렉 2)	Prince Charming	The Korean TV edition broadcast on KBS
2006	One Piece Film: Giant Mecha Soldier of Karakuri Castle (원피스 극장판: 기계태엽성의 메카거병)	Roronoa Zoro	
2007	Alvin and the Chipmunks (앨빈과 슈퍼밴드)	Ian Hawke	
2008	Bolt (볼트)	Bolt	
2009	Madagascar (마다가스카)	Alex	The Korean TV edition broadcast on KBS
2009	Thomas and Friends: The Great Discovery (토마스와 친구들 극장판)	The Storyteller	
2009	Alvin and the Chipmunks: The Squeakquel (앨빈과 슈퍼밴드 2)	Ian Hawke	

===== 2010s =====
Year	Title	Role(s)	Notes
2010	One Piece Film: Strong World (원피스 극장판: 스트롱 월드)	Roronoa Zoro	
2010	G-Force (G-포스: 기니피그 특공대)	Ben	
2010	Thomas and Friends: Hero of the Rails (토마스와 친구들 극장판 2)	The Storyteller	
2010	Toy Story 3 (토이 스토리 3)	Sheriff Woody	
2011	Yu-Gi-Oh! 3D: Bonds Beyond Time (유희왕: 시공을 초월한 우정)	Jack Atlas	
2011	Winnie the Pooh (곰돌이 푸)	Winnie the Pooh	He voiced Pooh on the in-flight movie edition. The theatrical edition of the film has never been released in South Korea.
2011	Alvin and the Chipmunks: Chipwrecked (앨빈과 슈퍼밴드 3)	Ian Hawke	
2011	Pokémon the Movie: Black—Victini and Reshiram (포켓몬스터 베스트위시 극장판: 비크티니와 백의 영웅 레시라무)	Mormont; Reshiram	
2011	Pokémon the Movie: White—Victini and Zekrom (포켓몬스터 베스트위시 극장판: 비크티니와 흑의 영웅 제크로무)	Mormont; Reshiram	
2012	One Piece Film: Straw Hat Chase (원피스 극장판: 밀짚모자 체이스)	Roronoa Zoro	
2012	Happy Feet Two (해피 피트 2)	Will the Krill	
2012	Detective Conan: The Eleventh Striker (명탐정 코난 극장판: 열한 번째 스트라이커)	Kazuyoshi Miura (Ahn Hong-ik)	
2012	Wolf Children (늑대아이)	The Wolfman	He voiced the character on the Korean IPTV edition of this film. The Korean dub was shown in small movie theaters across South Korea, and released on DVD the following year.
2013	One Piece Film: Z (원피스 극장판 제트)	Roronoa Zoro	
2013	Epic (에픽: 숲 속의 전설)	Professor Bomba	
2013	Berserk: Golden Age Arc: The Egg of the King (극장판 베르세르크 황금시대 편I: 패왕의 알)	Griffith	The Korean TV edition broadcast on Anibox TV
2013	Berserk: Golden Age Arc: The Battle for Doldrey (극장판 베르세르크 황금시대 편II: 돌도레이 공략)	Griffith	The Korean TV edition broadcast on Anibox TV
2013	Berserk: Golden Age Arc: The Advent (극장판 베르세르크 황금시대 편III: 강림)	Griffith	The Korean TV edition broadcast on Anibox TV

==== Film dubbing ====
===== 0-9 =====
- 3:10 to Yuma (3:10 투 유마, KBS)
  - Christian Bale as Dan Evans
- 10 Promises to My Dog (개와 나의 10가지 약속, Tooniverse)
  - Etsushi Toyokawa as Yuichi Saito

===== B =====
- A Better Tomorrow (영웅본색, KBS)
  - Leslie Cheung as Sung Tse-Kit
- A Better Tomorrow 2 (영웅본색 2, SBS)
  - Leslie Cheung as Sung Tse-Kit
- Breakfast on Pluto (플루토에서 아침을, KBS)
  - Cillian Murphy as Patrick/Patricia "Kitten" Braden
- The Brothers Grimm (그림 형제: 마르바덴 숲의 전설, KBS)
  - Heath Ledger as Jakob Grimm

===== C =====
- A Chinese Ghost Story (천녀유혼, KBS)
  - Leslie Cheung as Ning Caichen
- A Chinese Ghost Story: Part II (천녀유혼 2, KBS)
  - Leslie Cheung as Ning Caichen
- Closer (클로저, KBS)
  - Clive Owen as Larry Gray
- Cool Runnings (쿨 러닝, KBS)
  - Doug E. Doug as Sanka Coffie
- Crimson Rivers 2 (크림슨 리버 2, KBS)
  - Benoit Magimel as Detective Reda

===== D =====
- Days of Being Wild (아비정전, KBS)
  - Leslie Cheung as Yuddy
- The Departed (디파티드, KBS)
  - Matt Damon as Staff Sergeant Colin Sullivan
- Django Unchained (장고: 분노의 추적자, In-Flight Movie Edition)
  - Leonardo DiCaprio as Calvin J. Candie

===== E =====
- Ed Wood (에드 우드, KBS)
  - Johnny Depp as Ed Wood

===== F =====
- Face/Off (페이스 오프, KBS)
  - Alessandro Nivola as Pollux Troy
- The Faculty (패컬티, KBS)
  - Josh Hartnett as Zeke Tyler
- Farewell My Concubine (패왕별희, KBS)
  - Leslie Cheung as Cheng Dieyi

===== G =====
- Girl with a Pearl Earring (진주 귀걸이를 한 소녀, KBS)
  - Cillian Murphy as Pieter
- Gokaiger Goseiger Super Sentai 199 Hero Great Battle (극장판 파워레인저: 캡틴포스 VS 미라클포스 199 히어로 대결전, Korean-dubbed edition in theaters)
  - Ryota Ozawa as Captain Marvelous/Gokai Red
- Good Will Hunting (굿 윌 헌팅, KBS)
  - Matt Damon as Will Hunting
- The Great Gatsby (위대한 개츠비, In-Flight Movie Edition)
  - Leonardo DiCaprio as Jay Gatsby

===== H =====
- Heroic Duo (쌍웅, KBS)
  - Ekin Cheng as Inspector Ken Li

===== I =====
- The Imaginarium of Doctor Parnassus (파르나서스 박사의 상상극장, KBS)
  - Colin Farrell, Johnny Depp, and Jude Law as Tony within the Imaginarium
- The Incredible Hulk (인크레더블 헐크, In-Flight Movie Edition)
  - Edward Norton as Dr. Bruce Banner/Hulk

===== K =====
- Kung Fu Hustle (쿵푸 허슬, KBS)
  - Stephen Chow as Sing

===== L =====
- L.A. Confidential (LA 컨피덴셜, KBS)
  - Guy Pearce as Det. Lt. Edmund "Ed" Exley
- Legends of the Fall (가을의 전설, KBS)
  - Brad Pitt as Tristan Ludlow
- Lucky Number Slevin (럭키 넘버 슬레븐, KBS)
  - Josh Hartnett as Slevin Kelevra

===== M =====
- The Machinist (머시니스트, KBS)
  - Christian Bale as Trevor Reznik
- Meet the Fockers (미트 페어런츠 2, KBS)
  - Owen Wilson as Kevin Rawley
- Meet the Parents (미트 페어런츠, KBS)
  - Owen Wilson as Kevin Rawley
- Memento (메멘토, KBS)
  - Guy Pearce as Leonard Shelby
- Moonlight Express (성월동화, KBS)
  - Leslie Cheung as Shek Kar Bo/Tetsuya Misawa

===== N =====
- The Nightmare Before Christmas (크리스마스의 악몽, Korean-dubbed edition in theaters)
  - Chris Sarandon as Jack Skellington

===== O =====
- Ocean's Eleven (오션스 일레븐, KBS/SBS)
  - Brad Pitt as Rusty Ryan
- Ocean's Thirteen (오션스 써틴, In-Flight Movie Edition)
  - Brad Pitt as Rusty Ryan

===== P =====
- Pirates of the Caribbean: At World's End (캐리비안의 해적: 세상의 끝에서, KBS)
  - Johnny Depp as Captain Jack Sparrow
- Pirates of the Caribbean: The Curse of the Black Pearl (캐리비안의 해적: 블랙펄의 저주, KBS)
  - Johnny Depp as Captain Jack Sparrow
- Pirates of the Caribbean: Dead Man's Chest (캐리비안의 해적: 망자의 함, KBS)
  - Johnny Depp as Captain Jack Sparrow
- Purple Noon (태양은 가득히, KBS)
  - Alain Delon as Tom Ripley

===== R =====
- Romeo and Juliet (로미오와 줄리엣, KBS)
  - Leonard Whiting as Romeo Montague

===== S =====
- Seven (세븐, KBS)
  - Brad Pitt as Detective David Mills
- Seven Years in Tibet (티벳에서의 7일, KBS)
  - Brad Pitt as Heinrich Harrer
- Shanghai Knights (샹하이 나이츠, KBS)
  - Owen Wilson as Roy O'Bannon
- Shanghai Noon (샹하이 눈, KBS)
  - Owen Wilson as Roy O'Bannon/Wyatt Earp
- Shaolin Soccer (소림 축구, KBS)
  - Stephen Chow as "Mighty Steel Leg" Sing
- The Storm Riders (풍운, KBS)
  - Ekin Cheng as Whispering Wind

===== T =====
- Taxi (택시, MBC)
  - Naceri as Daniel
- The Time Traveler's Wife (시간 여행자의 아내, KBS)
  - Eric Bana as Henry DeTamble
- The Wind That Shakes the Barley (보리밭을 흔드는 바람, KBS)
  - Cillian Murphy as Damien O'Donovan

===== W =====
- Wedding Crashers (웨딩 크래셔, KBS)
  - Owen Wilson as John Beckwith

==== Foreign TV show dubbing ====
- Ben Hur (벤허, KBS)
  - Joseph Morgan as Judah Ben Hur
- Charlie Jade (찰리 제이드, KBS)
  - Jeffrey Pierce as Charlie Jade
- Cold Case (콜드 케이스, KBS)
  - Blake Robbins and Jade Carter as David Lake on the episode "Late Returns"
  - Jimmi Simpson as Ryan Bayes on the episode "Churchgoing People"
- Crouching Tiger, Hidden Dragon (와호장룡, KBS)
  - Peter Ho as Luo Xiaohu
- Dinotopia (공룡의 제국, KBS)
  - Tyron Leitso as Karl Scott
- Doctor Who (닥터 후, KBS)
  - David Tennant as the Tenth Doctor (except on the episode "The Parting of the Ways")
- Home Improvement (아빠 뭐 하세요?, KBS)
  - Taran Noah Smith as Mark Taylor
- Kaizoku Sentai Gokaiger (파워레인저 캡틴포스, Champ TV)
  - Ryota Ozawa as Captain Marvelous/Gokai Red
- Masked Rider Kabuto (가면라이더 가부토, Champ TV)
  - Hiro Mizushima as Souji Tendou (Kamen Rider Kabuto)
- The Legend of Tarzan (as part of The Disney Afternoon, 디즈니 만화동산: 타잔, KBS)
  - Tarzan
- Ring of the Nibelungs (니벨룽겐의 반지, KBS)
  - Benno Fürmann as Erik/Siegfried of Xanten
- Three Kingdoms (삼국지, KBS)
  - Peter Ho as Lü Bu

==== Narrations ====
- The Age of Romance (연애시대, SBS)
- Best Food Recipe (최고의 요리비결, EBS)
- Classical Destinations (음악기행 클래식, Korean TV Edition, EBS)
- Environment Special (환경스페셜, KBS)
- Interview Game (인터뷰 게임, SBS)
- The Most Beautiful Journey in the World (세상에서 가장 아름다운 여행, SBS)
- Our Sole Earth (하나뿐인 지구, EBS)
- Supernanny (개구쟁이 길들이기, Korean TV Edition, EBS)
- tvN eNEWS (tvN 이뉴스, tvN)

==== Commercial film dubbing ====
- Heineken (하이네켄)
  - Brad Pitt on a 2005 Super Bowl commercial "Beer Run"
- Nutrilite (뉴트리라이트)
  - Narration for "Farmer" commercial
  - Narration for "Nutrilite Double X" commercial
  - Narration for "The Vitality of Plant Nutrients" commercial
- Toyota Corolla (도요타 코롤라)
  - Narration for the commercial "Big Dream" featuring Hatsune Miku

==== Video game dubbing ====
- Aion Online (아이온 온라인)
- Dota 2 (도타 2)
  - Timbersaw
- The Epic of the Girls in the Sengoku Period (미소녀 닌자 모험기)
  - Yoshiyuki
- Kingdom Under Fire: A War of Heroes (킹덤 언더 파이어: 워 오브 히어로즈)
  - Curian
- MapleStory (메이플스토리)
  - Male Demonslayer
- Elsword (엘소드 온라인)
  - Ain
- Mobile Suit Gundam: Encounters in Space (기동전사 건담: 해후의 우주)
  - Amuro Ray
- Neon Genesis Evangelion: Girlfriend of Steel (신세기 에반게리온: 강철의 걸프렌드)
  - Kozo Fuyutsuki
  - Ryoji Kaji
  - Shigeru Aoba
- The War of Genesis III (창세기전 3)
  - Saladin
- The War of Genesis III: Part 2 (창세기전 3: 파트 2)
  - Saladin

=== TV appearance ===
Year	Title	Network	Role	Notes
2006	Toonichoice (투니초이스, currently Tooni One Choice)	Tooniverse	Himself	Kim appeared as one of the nominees for Best Voice Actor. He was nominated for voicing Pierre Tempête de Neige on the Korean dub of Sugar Sugar Rune.

=== Stage appearance ===
Year	Title	Role	Theater
1991	Les Misérables (레 미제라블)	Lesgles	Hoam Art Hall, Seoul

== Awards ==
=== Toonichoice ===
Year	Nominated work	Category	Result
2006	Pierre Tempête de Neige in Sugar Sugar Rune	Best Voice Actor	Nominated

=== KBS Radio Drama Awards ===
Year	Nominated work	Category	Result
2012	Kiss in That Wind in KBS Stage (그 바람에 입맞춤하다; Geu barame immatchumhada)	Best Voice Actor on the Radio	Nominated

== Trivia ==
- Kim sang some theme songs of his works, including "A New World (새로운 세상; Saeroun sesang), the opening theme for the first season of InuYasha which is he took charge of Sesshomaru and "Ripped Pants (찢어진 바지; Jjijeojin baji)", a soundtrack from SpongeBob SquarePants which is he took charge of SpongeBob SquarePants. The latter became popular in South Korea, through lots of Internet parodies of the lyrics beginning with "그런 짓은 하지 말아야 했는데 (English: I should not have done such a thing)". These parodies were used as a satire of someone for doing what should not have been done as near as the person is not stupid.

== See also ==
- Korean Broadcasting System
