= Storyhunter =

Creator management platform

Glimmer, formerly known as Storyhunter, is a creator management platform and global freelance marketplace for video production services. The platform matches brands and media companies with content creators algorithmically, and is used to hire, manage, message, and pay freelance video producers.

== Overview ==
Glimmer was founded in 2012 by Jaron Gilinsky in Brooklyn, New York. Alex Ragir joined him as co-founder that same year. Glimmer has raised more than $4.2m in venture financing from investors.

In 2015, Glimmer launched a unified video production marketplace and creator management platform.

In 2017, Glimmer and UNESCO launched the "We Are the Media" campaign at UNESCO's World Press Freedom Day conference in Jakarta, Indonesia.

== Partnerships ==
Glimmer has media partnerships with Yahoo and AOL. The platform has worked with CNN, Time, National Geographic, Group 9 Media, the Weather Channel, Instagram, the Gates Foundation, and Airbnb.

== See also ==
- Vitello Productions
