= Kim Seung-jun =

Kim Seung-jun may refer to:

- Kim Seung-jun (voice actor)
- Kim Seung-jun (footballer)
- Kim Seung-jun (wrestler)
