= Hiroki Takahashi =

Japanese actor and singer

- 高橋 広樹
- Born: Tokyo, Japan
- Occupations: Actor; voice actor; singer
- Years active: 1994–present
- Agent: Office Takagai
- Notable work: The Prince of Tennis as Eiji Kikumaru; Pokémon anime series as Tobias; School Rumble as Kenji Harima; Hunter × Hunter (1999) as Hisoka; Yu-Gi-Oh! Duel Monsters as Katsuya Jonouchi; Hetalia: Axis Powers as Japan; Street Fighter as Ryu; Final Fantasy XIV: Shadowbringers as Solus zos Galvus/Emet-Selch; Dakaichi as Takato Saijō
- Spouse: Aiko Aihashi
- Children: 1

Hiroki Takahashi (高橋 広樹, Takahashi Hiroki) is a Japanese actor, voice actor, and singer. His major roles include Eiji Kikumaru in The Prince of Tennis, Tobias in Pokémon, Kenji Harima in School Rumble, Hisoka in Hunter × Hunter (1999), Katsuya Jonouchi in Yu-Gi-Oh! Duel Monsters, and Takato Saijō in Dakaichi. On video games, he voiced Ryu in the Street Fighter series.

== Personal life ==
Takahashi is married to voice actress Aiko Aihashi. Their first son was born on June 24, 2016.

== Filmography ==
=== Anime ===
List of voice performances in anime
Year	Title	Role	Notes	Source
1994	Macross 7	Kinryu	Debut role	
1997	Kindaichi Case Files	Policeman		
1998	Beast Wars II: Super Life-Form Transformers	Mantis, Starscream, Hellscream		
1998	Shadow Skill Eigi	King Ashubal		
1999	Hunter × Hunter	Hisoka		
1999	Betterman	Cactus Prickle		
1999	Eden's Bowy	Quen		
1999	Magic User's Club	Military person	Ep. 1	
2000	Miami Guns	Anthony, Kousuke		
2000	Argento Soma	Announcement		
2000–2004	Yu-Gi-Oh! Duel Monsters	Katsuya Jonouchi		
2001	Sadamitsu the Destroyer	Luga		
2001	Transformers: Car Robots	Build Hurricane, Guildor		
2001	Chance Pop Session	Bassist		
2001	Read or Die	Genjo	OVA	
2001	Digimon Tamers	Impmon, Beelzemon		
2001	The Prince of Tennis	Eiji Kikumaru		
2003	Zatch Bell!	Parco Folgore		
2004	Area 88	Saki Vashtar		
2004	Burn-Up Scramble	Naruo Yuuji		
2004	Futari wa Pretty Cure	Pissard		
2004	Shura no Toki – Age of Chaos	Yakumo Mutsu		
2004–2008	School Rumble series	Kenji Harima		
2004	Mobile Suit Gundam SEED Destiny	Arthur Trine		
2006	Sumomomo Momomo	Kōshi Inuzuka		
2006	Nana	Shoji Endo		
2006	Ray the Animation	Shinoyama Toshiaki		
2006	Shōnen Onmyōji	Rikugō		
2006	Tokimeki Memorial Only Love	Inukai Kouya		
2006	Katekyō Hitman Reborn!	Superbia Squalo		
2007	Death Note	Stephen Gevanni		
2007	Moonlight Mile	Kousuke Sawamura		
2008	Neo Angelique Abyss	Rayne	Also Second Age	
2008	Real Drive	Aoi Souta		
2009	Street Fighter IV: The Ties That Bind	Ryu		
2009	Fight Ippatsu! Jūden-chan!!	Oumi Sento		
2009–present	Hetalia: Axis Powers series	Japan		
2010	HeartCatch PreCure!	Toshiyoka Yuuto		
2010	Beyblade: Metal Masters	Chao Xin		
2010–2011	Pokémon	Tobias		
2011	Rio: Rainbow Gate!	Elvis		
2012	Kamisama Kiss	Otohiko	Also second season	
2013	Magi: The Labyrinth of Magic	Zagan		
2014	DRAMAtical Murder	Koujaku		
2014	Hunter × Hunter (2011)	Pariston Hill		
2015	Sailor Moon Crystal	Crimson Rubeus		
2015	Beautiful Bones: Sakurako's Investigation	Hiroki Utsumi		
2016	One Piece	Bill		
2016	Scared Rider Xechs	Kazuki Suzuki		
2017	Akashic Records of Bastard Magic Instructor	Albert Frazer		
2018–2021	Dakaichi	Takato Saijo		
2019	Ensemble Stars!	Shū Itsuki		
2019	KonoSuba: God's Blessing on this Wonderful World! Legend of Crimson	Hyoizaburoo	Film	
2019	One Piece	Queen		
2019	Thus Spoke Kishibe Rohan	Young Man		
2021	Wonder Egg Priority	Ura-Acca		
2021	Scarlet Nexus	Seto Narukami		
2021–2023	Idolish7: Third Beat!	Ryo Tsukumo		
2021	The Faraway Paladin	Stagnate		
2022	Love All Play	Yūsuke Yokokawa		
2022	The Prince of Tennis II: U-17 World Cup	Ralph Rhinehart		
2022	Spy × Family	Keith Kepler		
2022	The Human Crazy University	Jōji Kitō		
2024	Mobile Suit Gundam SEED Freedom	Arthur Trine	Film	
2024	Dahlia in Bloom	Ivano Badoer		
2024	Tower of God 2nd Season	Urek Mazino		
2024	The Most Notorious "Talker" Runs the World's Greatest Clan	Hugo Coppelius		
2025	Promise of Wizard	Mithra		
2026	Kusunoki's Garden of Gods	Hōō		
2026	From Overshadowed to Overpowered	Genie		

=== Audio recordings ===
List of voice performances in audio recordings
Title	Role	Notes	Source
Jinnai no Sekai			
Macross 7 CD Cinema			
Rui no Masaiban			
Silent Mobius Original Audio Drama: Mobius Collage	Tao no shisha		
School Rumble Kikaku Album Drama + Super Oshibai Songs			
Cobalt Tokimeki Drama CD Remix			
El-Hazard	Katsuo		
Macross Generation	Sam		
Twinkle Stars	Kanade Miyako		

=== Tokusatsu ===
List of performances in tokusatsu
Year	Title	Role	Notes	Source
2010	Kamen Rider × Kamen Rider × Kamen Rider The Movie: Cho-Den-O Trilogy Episode Yellow	Eve	Movie	
2012	Tokumei Sentai Go-Busters	Megazordloid	Ep. 42	

=== Video games ===
List of voice performances in video games
Year	Title	Role	Notes	Source
2000	Brave Saga 2	Flash Kaiser	PlayStation	
2003	Growlanser Wayfarer of Time	Alphonse Christopher		
2005	Wild Arms: The 4th Detonator	Arnaud G. Vasquez	PlayStation 2	
2006	Neo Angelique	Rayne		
2006	Last Escort	Enju Kugami	PlayStation 2	
2008	Luminous Arc 2: Will	Rasche		
	SF Androgal	Buchimaro	Windows	
	Zatch Bell! series	Parco Folgore		
2008–2014	Street Fighter IV series	Ryu		
2008	Tatsunoko vs. Capcom	Ryu		
2011	Umineko: When They Cry	Willard H. Wright		
2012	Street Fighter X Tekken	Ryu		
2012	Project X Zone	Ryu, Genghis Bahn III		
2012	DRAMAtical Murder	Koujaku	PC	
2013	DRAMAtical Murder Re:connect	Koujaku	PC	
2014	DRAMAtical murder re:code	Koujaku	PS Vita and Nintendo Switch	
2014	Granblue Fantasy	Katzelia		
2014	Jooubachi No Oubou	Takanemaru		
2014	Super Smash Bros. for Nintendo 3DS / Wii U	Ryu	Downloadable character	
2015	Ensemble Stars!	Shū Itsuki		
2015	Idolish7	Ryo Tsukumo		
2015	Project X Zone 2	Ryu		
2016	Street Fighter V	Ryu		
2016	The King of Fighters XIV	Kukri		
2017	Nioh	Date Masamune	DLC-only	
2017	Ultra Street Fighter II: The Final Challengers	Ryu, Evil Ryu		
2018	Ryū ga Gotoku Online	Jo Sawashiro		
2018	SNK Heroines: Tag Team Frenzy	Kukri		
2019	Final Fantasy XIV	Solus zos Galvus/Emet-Selch	Stormblood, Shadowbringers, and Endwalker	
2019	Teppen	Ryu		
2019	Promise of Wizard	Mithra	Andrioid, iOS	
2020	Genshin Impact	Abyss Herald	Android, iOS, PC	
2021	Re:Zero − Starting Life in Another World: The Prophecy of the Throne	Wolf	PS4, Nintendo Switch, PC	
2021	Fist of the North Star Legends ReVIVE	Ryu	Android, iOS	
2022	The King of Fighters XV	Kukri		
2022	Xenoblade Chronicles 3	Teach		
2022	The King of Fighters All Star	Ryu	Android, iOS	
2023	Street Fighter 6	Ryu		
2024	Zenless Zone Zero	Lighter	Microsoft Windows, Android, iOS, PlayStation 5	

=== Dubbing ===
List of dubbing performances
Title	Role	Voice dub for	Notes	Source
Brothers	Tommy Cahill	Jake Gyllenhaal		
Prince of Persia: The Sands of Time	Dastan	Jake Gyllenhaal		
Source Code	Capt. Colter Stevens / Sean Fentress	Jake Gyllenhaal		
Enemy	Adam Bell / Anthony Clair	Jake Gyllenhaal		
Prisoners	Detective Loki	Jake Gyllenhaal		
Nightcrawler	Louis "Lou" Bloom	Jake Gyllenhaal		
Southpaw	Billy "The Great" Hope	Jake Gyllenhaal		
Velvet Buzzsaw	Morf Vandewalt	Jake Gyllenhaal		
Spider-Man: Far From Home	Quentin Beck / Mysterio	Jake Gyllenhaal		
Ambulance	Danny Sharp	Jake Gyllenhaal		
Guy Ritchie's The Covenant	Master Sgt. John Kinley	Jake Gyllenhaal		
In the Grey	Bronco Beauregard	Jake Gyllenhaal		
Amsterdam	Burt Berendsen	Christian Bale		
Apocalypto	Jaguar Paw	Rudy Youngblood		
As Above, So Below	George	Ben Feldman		
As the Light Goes Out			2013 film	
Awakening the Zodiac	Mick Branson	Shane West		
The Barefooted Youth	Han Yo-seok/Jang Yo-seok	Bae Yong-joon	KBS drama	
The Blind	Phil Robertson	Aron von Andrian; Matthew Erick White		
Bloodshot	Jimmy Dalton	Sam Heughan		
Carmina	Brad Chimyidoro			
Cinderella	Prince Robert	Nicholas Galitzine		
Cloud Atlas	Rufus Sixsmith, Nurse James, Archivist	James D'Arcy		
Cold Case	Scotty Valens	Danny Pino		
Confessions of a Shopaholic	Luke Brandon	Hugh Dancy		
The Curse of Sleeping Beauty	Thomas Kaiser	Ethan Peck		
CZ12	David	Liao Fan		
Detective Dee: The Four Heavenly Kings	Master Yuan Ce	Ethan Juan		
Doom Patrol	Larry Trainor / Negative Man	Matt Bomer		
Dragon Tiger Gate	Tiger Wong	Nicholas Tse		
Escape Plan 2: Hades	Shu	Huang Xiaoming		
The Fast and the Furious	Brian O'Conner	Paul Walker	2024 The Cinema edition	
2 Fast 2 Furious	Brian O'Conner	Paul Walker	2025 The Cinema edition	
Fast & Furious	Brian O'Conner	Paul Walker		
Fast Five	Brian O'Conner	Paul Walker		
Fast & Furious 6	Brian O'Conner	Paul Walker		
Furious 7	Brian O'Conner	Paul Walker		
The Fifth Commandment	Chance Templeton	Rick Yune		
Gangs of New York	Amsterdam	Leonardo DiCaprio	2005 NTV edition	
Grey's Anatomy	Atticus "Link" Lincoln	Chris Carmack		
Hardcore Henry	Akan	Danila Kozlovsky		
Hulk	Teenage Bruce Banner	Mike Erwin		
In the Heart of the Sea	Matthew Joy	Cillian Murphy		
Jason Bourne	Baumen	Stephen Kunken	2022 BS Tokyo edition	
Jersey Boys	Tommy DeVito	Vincent Piazza		
The Knight of Shadows: Between Yin and Yang	Ning Caichen	Ethan Juan		
The Last of Us	Tommy	Gabriel Luna		
Love of the Aegean Sea	Ruanji			
Manchester by the Sea	Lee Chandler	Casey Affleck		
The Monkey King 2	King of Yun Hai Xi Kingdom	Fei Xiang		
Mrs. America	Phil Crane	James Marsden		
My Cousin Rachel	Philip	Sam Claflin		
Never Said Goodbye	Tian Bo	Ethan Juan		
Operation Fortune: Ruse de Guerre	Danny	Josh Hartnett		
Outlander	Jamie Fraser	Sam Heughan		
Overdrive	Andrew Foster	Scott Eastwood		
Painted Skin: The Resurrection	Witch Doctor of Tianlang	Fei Xiang		
Pete's Dragon	Jack	Wes Bentley		
Pirates of the Caribbean: On Stranger Tides	Philip Swift	Sam Claflin		
The Player	Alex Kane	Philip Winchester		
Prince of Lan Ling	Yuwen Yong	Daniel Chan		
Raging Fire	Yau Kong-ngo	Nicholas Tse		
Ramona and Beezus	Hobart	Josh Duhamel		
Rogue	Pete McKell	Michael Vartan		
Safe Haven	Alex Wheatley	Josh Duhamel		
The Sinner	Jamie Burns	Matt Bomer		
Slither	Bill Pardy	Nathan Fillion		
Spread	Nikki	Ashton Kutcher		
Street Fighter	Ryu	Andrew Koji		
Strike Back	Michael Stonebridge	Philip Winchester		
Super Pumped	Emil Michael	Babak Tafti		
The Thing About Pam	Joel Schwartz	Josh Duhamel		
This Is Going to Hurt	Harry Muir	Rory Fleck Byrne		
Top Gun	Maverick	Tom Cruise	2005 NTV edition	
Track Down	Tsutomu Shimomura			
The Transporter Refueled	Frank Martin Jr.	Ed Skrein		
Transformers Animated	Optimus Prime	David Kaye		
Vehicle 19	Michael Woods	Paul Walker		
Violent Night	Jason	Alex Hassell		
Werewolf by Night	Jack Russell / Werewolf by Night	Gael García Bernal	2022 TV special	
White Collar	Neal Caffrey	Matt Bomer		
Wolf Man	Blake Lovell	Christopher Abbott		
Wu Kong	Yang Jian (Erlang Shen)	Shawn Yue		
X-Men: Apocalypse	William Stryker	Josh Helman		
Your Highness	Prince Fabious	James Franco		

=== Live-action ===
List of live-action performances
Title	Role	Notes	Source
The Prince of Tennis live-action			

== Other roles ==
List of other roles
Title	Role	Notes	Source
Ensemble Stars			
Samurai 7 stage play			
Umineko: When They Cry stage play	Krauss Ushiromiya		

== Discography ==
=== Albums ===
List of albums, with selected chart positions
Title	Album details	Oricon
Title	Album details	Peak position
Arinomama no hibi (ありのままの日々)	Released: November 26, 2004; Catalog No.: NECA-30123	
Hello!	Released: May 18, 2005; Catalog No.: NECA-30131	
Tenisunoōjisama kikumarueiji ga utau dōyō meikyoku-shū ~ famirī de tanoshimou!~ (テニスの王子様 菊丸英二が歌う童謡名曲集～ファミリーでたのしもう!～)	Released: March 11, 2009; Catalog No.: NECA-30242	145
Min'na de issho ni neyou yo (Hitsujideoyasumi shirīzu Vol. 14) (みんなで一緒に寝ようよ)	Released: August 29, 2008; Catalog No. HO-0023	229
Journey	Released: September 7, 2012; Catalog No.: NECA-30285	195
Kyūkyoku no damīheddo kan'nō songu SEVENTH hevun vol. 2 Hinata! (究極のダミーヘッド官能ソング SEVENTH HEAVEN vol.2 ヒナタ)	Released: May 29, 2013; Catalog No.: REC-054	45
Kyara nite sōrō Hiroki Takahashi Character Best 伽羅にて候	Released: July 31, 2013; Catalog No.: NECA-30297	270
Kokorozashi yakko yō (Bad Medicine: Black and White Vol. 1) 志奴要	Released: October 30, 2013; Catalog No: REC-073	101
Itsuka no fūkei Hiroki Takahashi 2003–2007 Singles (いつかの風景)	Released: December 25, 2013; Catalog No.: NECA-30304	

=== Singles ===
- (心を信じて) (2003)
- (今日もまた太陽は容赦なく輝く) (2004)
- "Be Yourself" (2005)
- (まだ見ぬ先へ) (2005)
- (ダイヤモンドの勇気) (2007)
- "Blessings" (2013)
