= Lee Seung-jun =

- Hangul: 이승준
- RR: I Seungjun
- MR: I Sŭngjun

Lee Seung-jun or Lee Seung-joon is the name of:

- Lee Seung-joon (actor born 1973), South Korean actor
- Lee Seung-joon (actor born 1978), South Korean actor
- Lee Seung-jun (basketball) (born 1978), South Korean basketball player
- Lee Seung-jun (member of a South Korean boy group ONF)
