= List of Shōnen Onmyōji characters =

This is the list of characters that appear in the Japanese light novel, manga and anime series, Shōnen Onmyōji.

== House of Abe ==
=== Abe no Masahiro ===
(安倍昌浩)
Voiced by: Yuki Kaida (Japanese); Candice Moore (English)
Masahiro is a 13-year-old Onmyōji in training and the grandson of Abe no Seimei. When he was young, Masahiro's spiritual sight was so strong that Seimei temporarily sealed it away until he was old enough to properly use it. After meeting Mokkun, Masahiro regained his spirit sight and embraced his destiny as an Onmyōji in service to the emperor.

Abe no Masahiro (left) and Guren (right)

He is friendly and kind to both yōkai and people whom he seeks to protect from evil demons that had taken up residence surrounding the imperial capital. Although he is sometimes cocky and clumsy, there are moments when he uses powers beyond those of a mere apprentice, which is why Seimei claims he is the only one who can succeed him. Masahiro greatly resents being known only as Seimei no Mago (晴明の孫; Seimei's grandson) and trains hard to surpass his grandfather.

He has two older brothers whom both are married and have families of their own. Narachika is the eldest in the family. His second older brother, Masachika, is ten years older than he is.

According to Ten'itsu, children in the Abe residence were often taken care by the twelve Shinshō. It was seen through flashbacks in the anime that Masahiro was taken care by Guren.

In addition to his magic, Masahiro later receives a sword called the Gōma no Tsurugi, a sword which was forged by Seimei which previously belonged to Suzaku. He was also given Kagutsuchi (軻遇突智) by Takao no Kami, flames that has the power to kill gods, to destroy the corrupted Guren.

In addition, he erased Guren's memories that are about him, meaning that Guren will never remember the time when he met Masahiro in the form of a mononoke or the time when they were fighting demons together.

He cares a lot about his friends, his family and his love, Fujiwara no Akiko whom he vows to protect no matter what.

=== Abe no Seimei ===
(安倍晴明)
Voiced by: Mugihito (old), Akira Ishida (young) (Japanese); William Gary Ladick (English)
The greatest onmyōji in the history of Japan, Abe no Seimei is the grandfather of Masahiro. He is in his 80s and he has twelve shikigami called the Shinshō whom he calls his friends under his command and is able to protect his soul, which takes the form of his younger self, outside of his body to aid Masahiro in combat. However, by doing so leaves his body defenceless if an enemy attacks.

He constantly needles Masahiro to push him further in his journey as a sort of reverse psychology, which causes Masahiro to refer to Seimei as a "tanuki" or raccoon dog.

Rumour has it that Seimei's mother was not human but a powerful fox spirit, which may explain why he is so powerful. Despite showing such a happy attitude, there were two moments of his life that he was sad, the first when he could not save his only best friend, Ryūsai and secondly the death of his wife, Wakana whom he loved deeply.

The character is loosely based on a real person of the same name.

=== Abe no Wakana ===
(安倍若菜)
Voiced by: Naoko Suzuki
Wakana is Seimei's wife and Yoshimasa's mother. She died when Yoshimasa was only two years old due to an illness. Although she died a long time ago, her spirit has not crossed to the other side. During the final episode, Masahiro, ready to cross over to the other side, meets and talks to her in the spirit world, not realizing that she is his grandmother. She invites Masahiro to sit beside her and tells him that she has not crossed to the other side just yet because her lover has not come. This reminds Masahiro of the person that is precious to him and he decides to return to the world of the living.

=== Abe no Yoshimasa ===
(安倍吉昌)
Voiced by: Tarusuke Shingaki (Japanese); William Gary Ladick (English)
Yoshimasa is Masahiro's father and Seimei's youngest son. He is married to Tsuyuki and has three sons: Narichika, Masachika and Masahiro. He has a doctorate in stargazing and is a prominent figure in the onmyō world. However, he is not as powerful as Seimei or Masahiro (after he realizes his potential). Yoshimasa realizes that Masahiro is the true heir to Seimei, as acknowledged by Guren, as he is the only one not afraid of his aura.

He is a kind and supportive father who turns a blind eye to Masahiro's nightly escapades to fight demons and makes up excuses for him at the onmyō dorms.

=== Abe no Tsuyuki ===
(安倍露樹)
Voiced by: Tomo Shigematsu (Japanese); Carina Hales (English)
Tsuyuki is Yoshimasa's wife and Masahiro's mother. She knows about Masahiro fighting demons at night but does not say anything to him because she wants him to tell her personally. Later in series, Tsuyuki also teaches Akiko things that girls her age do, such as going shopping in the market and sewing.

She knows Yoshimasa very well; she could tell that he is worried about Masahiro going to Izumo to kill the corrupted Guren even when he does not tell her. Yoshimasa even went as far to say that the thought on how well Tsuyuki understand himself frightens him.

=== Abe no Narichika ===
(安倍成親)
{{Voiced by Nobutoshi Canna|Mark Aspiras}}
Narachika is Yoshimasa's eldest son and Masahiro's oldest brother. He has an easygoing personality and is, personality wise out of the three brothers, most similar to Seimei. He married into his wife's family and has two sons and a one-year-old daughter named Kōhime, (小姫). Narichika has a doctorate in calendar and date studies, making him a highly recognized figure in the dorm.

He cares for his family and Masahiro a lot.

=== Abe no Masachika ===
(安倍昌親)
Voiced by: Noriaki Sugiyama (Drama CD)
Masachika is Masahiro's second-oldest brother.

== House of Fujiwara ==
=== Fujiwara no Akiko ===
(藤原彰子) Voiced by: Sanae Kobayashi (Japanese); Aprille Fernandez (English)

Akiko is an imperial princess and the daughter of the minister of the left. She and Masahiro first meet in the Imperial Palace after his coming of age ceremony and the two become good friends after he saves her from a demon attack. As the series progresses, both of them fall in love with each other.

Akiko is special, as she possesses the Kenki ability (the ability to see demons). Moreover, because of this, during the beginning of the series, the foreign demons constantly attack her to deliver Akiko as a sacrifice to their master. They manage to capture her but Masahiro and his allies were able to save her, but not before the demons gave a curse wound on her hand.

Halfway through the series, Akiko's father attempted to introduce her into the imperial court as a wife for the Emperor, thereby separating her from Masahiro forever. In her moment of sadness, Kyūki was able to put a powerful curse through her wounded hand. While the curse was eventually removed, according to Seimei the after-effects of the curse were so serious to Akiko that an onmyōji was required keep the curse from overwhelming her.

As a result, she was not sent to imperial court -as that would bring bad luck to the Emperor- so her half-sister Shōko, who looks the same as her, was sent into the palace in her place. Akiko was instead sent to live with Seimei's family to deal with the curse under the identity as distant relative of theirs. (There are suggestions that Seimei tricked Akiko's father into thinking that so she and Masahiro could remain close, since he knows about their feelings for each other. However, it is also revealed Seimei was having difficulty in finding an auspicious date to send Akiko to court.)

It should be also noted that her Kenki ability is stronger than both Seimei and Masahiro because she was able to see a spirit that was possessing Masahiro while neither Masahiro nor Seimei could.

At the Abe residence, Akiko remains a strong help to Masahiro and helps around the house, learning to do things what an ordinary girl does, like going shopping by herself thanks to the help of Tsuyuki, Masahiro's mother.

During the middle of the series (episode 10), Masahiro promises Akiko that he will show her fireflies at Kifune mountain next year at summer time. In the final episode of the anime, he is shown fulfilling his promise.

=== Fujiwara no Yukinari ===
(藤原行成) Voiced by: Toshihiko Seki (Japanese); Jerry Szombathy (English)

Yukinari is the minister of the right to the Emperor, whose primary duty is the management and upkeep the imperial capital.

Yukinari takes a liking to Masahiro from the moment they meet, and constantly encourages him to advance in his studies because he knows he will be a powerful onmyōji like Seimei, which of course promotes a high amount of jealousy among Masahiro's peers in the Onmyō dorms. Seimei helped him long ago and because of this Yukinari offered to be Masahiro's guardian at his coming of age ceremony in return.

During the series, he was cursed by a vengeful spirit who had mistaken him for his grandfather, but the spirit was later exorcised thanks to Masahiro.

He also seems to be aware of Masahiro's activities in fighting demons.

=== Fujiwara no Toshitsugu ===
(藤原敏次) Voiced by: Jun Fukuyama (Japanese); Rick MacIvor (English)

Toshitsugu is two years Masahiro's senior; he works at the Onmyō dorms with him. He is a diligent worker who values effort and hard work above all else. He has a nickname, Tosshi (とっしー)

He was the first person who talked to Masahiro but after a misunderstanding of seeing Masahiro at night when he was supposed to be at home on rest. Toshitsugu's attitude became harsh and critical, saying he should not do as he wishes just because of his family's influence.

Toshitsugu shows promise as an onmyōji by "normal" standards (not compared to Seimei or Masahiro). He does not know of Masahiro's power, but gets suspicious after a cloaked Masahiro saved him.

He was possessed by a vengeful spirit summoned by Kazane in the Kazane arc and placed a curse on Yukinari who had taken care of him since he was young. Masahiro eventually breaks the curse where he had no memory of the incident.

== The Twelve Shinshō ==
Jūni Shinshō (十二神将)

The twelve Shinshō have been in existence for a very, very long time and can be considered lower rank gods. In the series, they serve Abe no Seimei, the greatest onmyōji of all time. Unless Seimei summons them, they usually reside in the spirit world of the Gods.

Takao no Kami, the goddess of Kifune Mountain, tells Masahiro that the twelve Shinshō are special as they were actually created by peoples' dreams. Over time, peoples' dreams and imagination were transformed into the twelve Shinshō, giving them unique forms and personalities. As such, they can be considered to be the 'children' of humans. As a result, they are forbidden from harming, let alone killing, humans. If they break this rule, they will lose their souls and become demons.

Although they are gods who possess strong powers, they can be injured, feel pain and lose their lives. When one of them dies, they will be reborn instantly, as people's dreams never stop giving them their form, but they will forget their past self and continue on as a completely different personality.

=== Mokkun/Guren/Tōda ===
(もっくん), (紅蓮) Voiced by: Katsuyuki Konishi (Guren), Junko Noda (Mokkun) (Japanese); Chris Carroll (Guren), Andrea Kwan (Mokkun) (English)

Guren is one of twelve Shinshō in service to Seimei, who gave him his current name, after he pledged his servitude. His original name is Tōda, (騰蛇) and the other Shinshō still address him by this name. Only Seimei and Masahiro call him Guren.

When in Masahiro's company, Guren usually takes the form of an ayakashi, although Masahiro considers him to be a mononoke and calls him Mokkun when in that form. Because he's invisible to anyone without a spirit sense, Mokkun frequently plays tricks on people who annoy him, much to Masahiro's chagrin. It was also shown in the anime that Guren dislikes babies, because according to him, babies often cry for no reason. However, Masahiro disagrees, saying that Guren was merely afraid that the children who see him will hate him.

Guren watched over and protected Masahiro from the time he was a baby because Masahiro was the only person who was not afraid of him. Because of this, and despite how they constantly bicker with each other, Masahiro and Guren share a deep sense of friendship and trust and both are willing to lay down their own lives for the other.

It is also mentioned that Guren is one of the most feared summon gods, possessing the power of controlling the fires of Hell. Seimei created a golden fillet that Guren wears and which prevents his own strength from overwhelming him. In the form of Mokkun, the familiar is able to erect barriers and project crescent shaped blades of energy; in the form of Guren, he attacks with blasts of fire and a trident.

Seimei cites the fact that Masahiro does not fear Guren as proof that his grandson is the only one fit to be his successor.

In the past, Seimei's best friend, Ryūsai, forced Guren to try to kill Seimei and after that kill himself by means of the Baku-kon spell, which takes control of the subject's heart. Because of that incident, most of the other Shinshō do not trust Guren, though Kōchin states that their opinion of him is improving with Masahiro's help.

Later in the series, Guren is corrupted by Chishiki no Gūji, losing his soul and becoming a cold-blooded monster who almost leaves Masahiro to die. It is later revealed that he's a slave of the Underworld, as he controls the Fires of Hell. His blood was required to break the final seal of the gate to the Underworld.

At the end of the anime, Masahiro revives Guren; saving his life in exchange for Guren's memories of Masahiro being sealed away, so he would not have to remember and regret the terrible things he has done. Despite Guren having no memory of who he is, Masahiro felt that it was better than seeing him die. However, Guren is still one of Seimei's familiars. As such, he is under orders from Seimei to continue to look after Masahiro.

=== Kōchin ===
(勾陣) Voiced by: Risa Hayamizu (Japanese); Aprille Fernandez (English)

Kōchin appears as a mature-looking woman, about 25 years old with shoulder-length black hair. She is ranked second strongest of the twelve in attack power, after Guren. She specializes in close range fighting with twin sai.

Unlike the others, Kōchin does not resent Guren much, if at all, and is actually close to him, as seen when he refers to Kōchin as 'Kō'. When Masahiro asks him about this, he refuses to respond.

She also watched over Masahiro when he was a baby together with Guren. She is very observant and has a clear grasp of all of the Shinshō's personalities. She is also very good at noticing small details.

Her second name from Seimei is Keito (慧斗).

=== Rikugō ===
(六合) Voiced by: Hiroki Takahashi (Japanese); Jerry Szombathy (English)

Rikugō's primary role is to be Seimei's on-call bodyguard, but he will leave Seimei's side to aide Masahiro should he be ordered to do so. His sense of loyalty is so strong that he was willing to put aside his doubts regarding Masahiro's abilities and accepted him as Seimei's successor on little more than his master's assurances.

He differs from the other Shinshō in that he rarely uses magical attacks, preferring instead to fight opponents with a barbed spear. He can also use his cape as a shield and create an explosive 360-degree shock wave of air by striking the ground with his weapon. He also has a chain that he used against the corrupted Guren but it proved ineffective.

Rikugō is a man of few words and only speaks when he must. The only way to notice any change in his emotions was through his eyes. This began to change, however, after he met Kazane, whom he fell in love with. He saved Kazane's life twice. The first, when she was swallowed by a demon and then another time when they were in the underworld.

He began to show emotions soon after that. He was furious when she was killed. Just before she died, they shared an emotional embrace and he revealed to her that his name is Saiki, and that she is the only one he had told his name to.

Seimei gave him the name Rikugo, and only Seimei and Kazane know "Saiki" Saiki (彩輝) as well.

=== Seiryū ===
(青龍) Voiced by: Toshiyuki Morikawa (Japanese); Mardjuki Curran Shane (English)

Seiryū is stubborn, anti-social and has a bad temper. He harbors a deep contempt for Guren due to his attempted murder of Seimei and considers Masahiro to be unworthy to be Seimei's successor. Seiryū even went as far as to say that if Guren ever harmed a human again, he would personally kill him.

He attacks with blasts of lightning and fights with a large two handed scythe. His second name from Seimei is Shōran (宵藍). Seiryū cares about Seimei's wellbeing more than any of the others. However, he always shows his care through anger.

=== Suzaku ===
(朱雀) Voiced by: Kenichi Suzumura (Japanese); Ron Studd (English)

Suzaku, like Guren, is a fire user. However, unlike Guren's destructive flames, Suzaku's flames are used to purify evil spirits. He uses a heavy-bladed Zanbato to slash his enemies.

Suzaku has bright red hair and wears a white strip of cloth around his forehead, which was originally Ten'itsu's. He is very much in love with Ten'itsu and is fiercely protective of her due to her wound transfer ability, going as far as to hit Masahiro after Ten'itsu saved him.

The reason he cares about her is that Ten'itsu's past self was Suzaku's best friend who was reborn right before his eyes after she died. Not wanting to lose her again, he decided to become her protector.

His sword was later lent to Masahiro so he could infuse it with the power to kill gods.

=== Ten'itsu ===
(天一) Voiced by: Rie Tanaka (Japanese); Denise Tan Shu Fen (English)

Ten'itsu has the appearance of a young woman with long blond hair. Her earring originally belonged to Suzaku. Unlike the other members of the Shinshō, she specializes more in magic than combat, particularly healing and clairvoyance. However, she is still able to create defensive shields with her magic.

When someone has a very serious wound, she heals it by transferring the wound to herself, something that distresses her lover and fellow Shinshō, Suzaku.

Ten'itsu's other name is Tenki, (天貴) and only Suzaku uses it. She is usually seen protecting Akiko or just keeping her company. She is the only Shinshō of the twelve that has died before. Her past self wore her hair short and was loud and energetic.

=== Tai'in ===
(太陰) Voiced by: Hiromi Konno (Japanese); Chelsea Curto (English)

Tai'in is a wind user who resembles a young girl with high pigtails. She also has a childish personality despite having lived for a long time. Several Shinshō consider her to be rash.

Tai'in attacks with mini tornadoes and can also use the wind to communicate and pass messages. She can also 'read' the wind to know what is happening at other places but she is not good at it.

Because of her personality, she is often on the receiving end of Byakko's lectures, with the current record being 8 hours. Tai'in does not like slimy things and often appears with Genbu.

She can create a tornado to transport people to other places but the ride is usually very rough. A recurring gag in the series is that whenever she uses this, Masahiro and Genbu falls on the ground, with only the other Shinshō remaining standing.

=== Genbu ===
(玄武) Voiced by: Junko Minagawa (Japanese); George Cahill IV (English)

Genbu resembles a young 13-year-old boy. Although not possessing much ability in combat, Genbu specializes in defence and making barriers. However, out of the four people that can make barriers, his ability is the weakest.

He is a water user and has a water mirror that allows the user to see things happening far away. He can also use the mirror to communicate with fellow water user, Tenkō. Genbu is often seen with Tai'in, whom he berates for the things she does.

=== Tenkō ===
(天后) Voiced by: Natsuko Kuwatani (Japanese); Charmaine Cordoviz (English) (anime only)

Tenkō, like Genbu, is a water user. She appears to be about the same age as Kazane and has long, light silver hair. Tenkō is the weakest out of the eight fighting Shinshō. She gets along well with Kōchin.

She is as stubborn as Seiryū but has her gentle side. She first appears in the 20th episode & finally had her first speaking role in the final episode of the series.

=== Taijō ===
(太裳) Voiced by: Masaya Matsukaze (Japanese); Mark Aspiras (English)

Taijō is a man with green hair. He appears as a very calm and respectful man, who always call Seimei's family with the suffix "sama".

He first appeared in the 20th episode & finally had his first speaking role in the final episode of the series.

=== Byakko ===
(白虎) Voiced by: Kazuhiro Nakata (Japanese); George Cahill III (English)

Byakko resembles a strong middle-aged man with grayish-green hair. Like Tai'in, he is a wind user but his wind is more 'gentle' and travels more slowly than Tai'in's. He treats Tai'in and Genbu like his children.

He is also the only one that can keep Tai'in under control.

=== Tenkū ===
Tenkū (天空)
Voiced by: Hiroshi Arikawa
Tenkū resembles an old man with a long beard. He is the governor of the twelve Shinshō and rarely leaves the spirit world. He has the strongest ability of making barriers and defence among all the Shinshō. This was seen with the fact that he can immobilize enemies without leaving the spirit world. He also makes all of the Shinshō's weapons. He first appears in the 20th episode & finally had his first speaking role in the final episode of the series where he talks to Takao no Kami about Masahiro's willingness to save Guren at the cost of his life.

== Other important characters ==
=== Takaokami no Kami ===
(高淤の神) Voiced by: Atsuko Tanaka (Japanese); Denise Tan Shu Fen (English)

She is the dragon goddess of Kifune Mountain. She is a very powerful god that the twelve Shinshō including Seimei respect. When Kyūki and his demons came to Japan, he manipulated Akiko's cousin Keiko to seal her so that he and his demons could hide at Kifune Mountain without interference. Masahiro who used his magic to break the seal later freed her.

As a sign of gratitude, she saves Masahiro's life after a possessed Akiko stabs him. Later in the series, she helps Masahiro and his companions when the capital is in trouble. She also took over Masahiro's body to discuss important issues with Guren regarding Masahiro but later decides to tell the latter herself in her human form.

She usually appears as a white dragon but later appears as a purple haired woman in her 30s usually telling anyone to call her Takao when she is in her human form. Even so, her official name is Takaokami no Kami (高龗神).

She later gave Masahiro Kagutsuchi (軻遇突智), flames that has the power to kill gods to kill Guren who has been corrupted.

=== Kurumanosuke ===
(車之輔) Voiced by: Katsuyuki Konishi (drama CD only)

A yōkai who resembles a carriage with a wide-mouthed ogre's face mounted on the left wheel.

Masahiro first encountered Kurumanosuke while patrolling the streets of the capital and almost exorcised him for allegedly attacking a human, but spared him after realizing Kurumanosuke was only trying to help a drunk who had passed out in the street.

Later, Kurumanosuke accepted Masahiro as his master and serve him by taking him to places he wants to go. When the capital was invaded by demons from the Underworld, it was Kurumanosuke who helped hide the Zakki in his carriage to save their lives.

=== The Zakki ===
(雑鬼)

The term 'zakki' is used to refer to the demons of lower rank. Since Masahiro exorcised Ban Ban, a demon that was attacking the Zakki, they now act as informants for Masahiro, telling him of any strange happenings or sightings.

In the anime, the Zakki are usually represented by three demons; a lizard with three eyes, a yellow skinned gremlin and a pink, round ball. The Zakki usually appear by suddenly dropping out of the sky and landing on his head and calling him "Seimei's grandson" much to his dismay, a running gag in the light novels and anime.

== Kyūki Arc ==
=== Kyūki ===
(窮奇) Voiced by: Norio Wakamoto (Japanese); Jerry Szombathy (English)

The leader of the foreign demons, Kyūki's form is that of a gigantic winged tiger with horns and saber fangs but can also assume the shape of a massive demon bull. After losing his territory in China to a rival demon, Kyūki and his army of demons seek to establish a new territory in Japan, specifically around the imperial capital.

Although possessing incredible strength and power, Kyūki is hampered by a massive wound on his throat inflicted by the demon which chased him from China and which requires the consumption of someone possessing great spiritual power to heal. As Seimei is too strong for him to attack, Kyūki targets Masahiro instead but also pursues Akiko as well for her Kenki ability and because beautiful longhaired girls are his favorite food.

He usually has his followers attack his enemies and uses his enemies' desires to control them. He is eventually killed when Masahiro uses the Gōma no Tsurugi to stab him though the chest to transmit a spell directly into Kyūki's body.

=== Fujiwara no Keiko ===
(藤原圭子) Voiced by: Shizuka Itō (Japanese); Erika Szombathy (English)

Fujiwara no Keiko is Akiko's cousin and a member of the Fujiwara clan. She was once engaged to a man who then wed another woman instead. What angered her was that the woman he married was from a higher noble family and had begged him to marry her.

Kyūki used her heartbreak to possess her with the promise that if she helped him, he would curse her beloved's wife and force him to leave her and return to Keiko. Although the possession sickened her body and confined her to bed, Keiko's cursed spirit was able to leave the house and help Kyūki by sealing the dragon goddess of Kifune Mountain so his army could hide on the mountain.

While under Kyūki's influence she was willing to do anything to be with the man she loved, even kill anyone who got in her way and sacrificing her cousin Akiko.

Seimei was able to exorcise her and she woke up in her home not remembering anything that had happened.

=== Ban Ban ===
(蛮蛮)

- Its phonation is voiced, which means the vocal cords vibrate during the articulation.

Looking like a giant-bodied rat with the head of a turtle, he was one of Kyūki's followers. He was also the demon that made Masahiro realize that the demons he was fighting were from China.

He first appears in Masahiro dreams and later attack the Zakki in their hideout where he dies bleeding from his injuries from fighting Guren and Masahiro.

=== Gaku ===
(鶚) Voiced by: Kenichi Mochizuki (Japanese); James Shubert (English)

Gaku is one of Kyūki's advisors and lieutenants to his followers. It always looks down upon their opponents believing all of them are weak. The other adviser is Shun (鵔)

It was one of the demons whom were responsible for putting a cursed wound on Akiko's hand. Due to his overconfidence, Masahiro and the Shinshō finally killed them.

== Kazane Arc ==
=== Kazane ===
(風音) Voiced by: Fumiko Orikasa (Japanese); Candice de Rozario (English)

She is initially introduced as a daughter of Ryūsai. She is a formidable fighter, able to use magic and weapons as well. She is able to stand her ground and even defeat Seiryu and Genbu in a 2-on-1 battle.

She has a deep hatred for Guren because she believes that he killed her father. She has a crow for a companion named Kai and cares very deeply for it. She and Rikugō seem to have feelings for each other.

Rikugō has the most confrontations with her and ended up falling in love with her. He tried to talk some sense in her that Chishikii no Gūji is just using her to open the Underworld but she replied that it is of her own free will.

It is later revealed that she is not really Ryūsai's daughter but in fact the daughter of Chigaeshi no Miko. Chishiki no Gūji kidnapped her when she was young and had her memories sealed. She was trained by Ryūsai and was told a lie that Seimei and Guren were responsible for her parents' death.

Unknown to her, she was secretly used to open the first gate of the Underworld due to the fact only those related to the Priestess can open the gate.

When she found out the truth and was weakened by Chishiki no Gūji to open the gate, she tried to escape from the underworld demons where her pet crow, Kai sacrificed his life by teleporting her away. It was all in vain as she was killed by a demon who stabbed her through the chest.

Despite being a villain, she was still a good person since did care about Princess Nagako and tried to send her back to her family as she regretted kidnapping and using her in the first place.

Her last moments before dying were with Rikugō, who held her in his arms, where she learned his real name. Her necklace was used to defeat Chishiki no Gūji and was later given to Rikugō by her mother, who later brought her daughter's body back to their home.

=== Nagako Naishinō ===
(脩子内親王) Voiced by: Asuka Tanii (Japanese); Mariel Reyes (English)

She is the Emperor's daughter. When her brother was born, her parents, joyful that they finally had a son, ignored her. Feeling lonely and bitter, she was befriended by Kazane, who was disguised as a nanny. Kazane used her anger to curse the capital. Despite being used by Kazane, Nagako still loves her because Kazane is the only friend she has ever had.

When she was sent to the underworld, she felt that nobody, not even her mother, cared about her anymore. However, when Masahiro and Genbu show Nagako that her mother still cares for her and regrets not spending time with her, she realizes that her parents still love her. She is later reunited with her family.

=== Chigaeshi no Miko ===
Priestess of the Overturned Earth (道反の巫女)

She is mother of Kazane. She resides in the Overturned Earth, a realm between the human world and the underworld where the guardians of the underworld protects her and her family, large animals whose duty is to serve the Priestess and protect the seal of the Underworld.

Fifty years before the Kazane arc began; she sought the help of onmyōji Seimei and Ryūsai to help her seal the gates of the underworld since the seal was getting weaker. However, Ryūsai fell deeply in love and kidnapped her instead.

She later left Ryūsai to go back to the realm but was kidnapped by Chishiki no Gūji. He sealed her into a frozen rock since he could not get her to open the Underworld gate; instead, he used her daughter, Kazane. She was later found and rescued by Seimei.

However, she was later in grief when she found out her daughter, Kazane died. She later brought back her daughter's body back to her home and gave Rikugō her necklace as a sign of gratitude for protecting her daughter.

=== Ryūsai Enoki ===
Enoki Ryūsai (榎岦斎) Voiced by: Junichi Suwabe

He is Seimei's only best friend and a powerful onmyōji. While Ryūsai was not as powerful as Seimei, he had learnt the Baku-kon spell. The Baku-kon spell could forcefully control anyone's heart, which is a spell that Seimei dislikes.

Fifty-five years ago, he accompanied Seimei to Izumo to check a disturbance there despite objection by Seimei not to follow him. There, he and Seimei met Chigaeshi no Miko who he fell deeply in love with. He was soon manipulated by Chishiki no Gūji to kidnap the Priestess and break the seal of the Underworld and made to believe that by doing so, he could get the Priestess all for himself.

When Guren and Seimei tried to stop him, he uses the Baku-kon spell on Guren and made him try to kill Seimei. Guren finally killed him, but his body was used by Chishiki no Gūji's soul. He uses his body to help him in his plan with the promise that he could still get the Priestess all for himself. His body was finally destroyed by Rikugō & Seimei and his spirit thanks Seimei for freeing him.

=== Chishiki no Soushu ===
Shrine Priest of Knowledge (智鋪の宗主) Voiced by: Ryūsei Nakao

He is the real villain that has been controlling Kazane and Ryūsai. Seimei and his Shinshō fought him once before many years ago, but now he has returned to open the Gates of the Underworld.

He is also called by the name of Chishiki no Gūji (智鋪の宮司) or Chishiki no Chi no Kami (智鋪地神)

Rikugō was the first one to realize he was back because he heard Kazane talking to him through a second head protruding from her crow, Kai.

When he was mortally injured, he transferred his soul into Ryūsai's body to continue his plans. He trained Kazane and lied about what happen to her parents so she would help him open the gates of the underworld.

He later also controls Guren since his blood was needed to break the final seal. He was finally killed, by Kazane's necklace.
