= Sakura Asagi =

Japanese manga artist

Sakura Asagi Japanese: あさぎ桜
- Born: December 26 Japan
- Area: Manga artist
- Notable works: Shōnen Onmyōji, Saint Beast

Sakura Asagi (あさぎ 桜, Asagi Sakura) is a Japanese animator, illustrator, and manga artist.

She contributed her character design for the series Shōnen Onmyōji and Saint Beast. Apart from illustrating for the novel series Shōnen Onmyōji, she also authors the manga, which acts as a gaiden for the main story which serializes in Kadokawa Shoten's Beans Ace.

Even so, it is not to be confused with Hinoko Seta who authors the manga adaptation of the series in Kadokawa Shoten's Monthly Asuka.

== Works ==
=== Manga ===
- Shōnen Onmyōji - serialized in Beans Ace

=== Artbooks ===
- Sakura Asagi Illustration works: Saint Beast

== Contributions ==
=== Character designs ===
- Ashita ga Aru sa - Megumi Hayashibara
- Aquarian Age Aquarian Age Calls Uō Uō! - Megami Magazine
- Mobile Suit Gundam W Blind Target
- Mobile Suit Gundam W Endless Waltz (Part 1 and Part 2)
- Mobile Suit Gundam W Frozen Teardrop
- Shōnen Onmyōji series
- Saint Beast series
