= List of Magi: The Labyrinth of Magic episodes =

First Japanese Blu-ray cover, featuring Alibaba Saluja (left) and Aladdin (right)

Magi: The Labyrinth of Magic is a Japanese anime series based on the manga series of the same title written and illustrated by Shinobu Ohtaka. Produced by A-1 Pictures, it began airing in Japan on October 7, 2012. It also debuted in North America on October 10 on Crunchyroll and Hulu. It is licensed by Aniplex of America in North America, by Viz Media Europe in Europe and by Madman Entertainment in Australia. From episodes 1–12, the opening theme song is "V.I.P." by SID and the ending theme song is "Yubi Bōenkyō" by Nogizaka46. From episode 13 onwards, the opening song is "Matataku Hoshi no Shita de" by Porno Graffitti and the ending is "The Bravery" by Supercell.

A second season, Magi: The Kingdom of Magic began airing on October 6, 2013. For the first part, the opening theme song is "Anniversary" by SID and the ending theme song is "Eden" by Aqua Timez, while for the second part, the opening theme song is "Hikari" by Vivid and the ending theme song is "With You/With Me" by 9nine.

== Series overview ==
Season	Episodes	Originally released	
Season	Episodes	First released	Last released
1	25	October 7, 2012	March 31, 2013
2	25	October 6, 2013	March 30, 2014

== Episodes ==
Just like the manga, all episodes of Magi are labeled "Nights" in an allusion to the tales of the One Thousand and One Nights which served as a primary inspiration to the story.

=== Magi: The Labyrinth of Magic (2012–13) ===
No. overall	No. in season	Title	Original release date	English air date
1	1	"Aladdin and Alibaba"; Transliteration: "Arajin to Aribaba" (Japanese: アラジンとアリババ)	October 7, 2012	October 18, 2013
2	2	"Dungeon Suite"; Transliteration: "Danjon Kumikyoku" (Japanese: 迷宮組曲)	October 14, 2012	October 25, 2013
3	3	"Magician of Creation"; Transliteration: "Sōsei no Mahōtsukai" (Japanese: 創世の魔法使い)	October 21, 2012	November 1, 2013
4	4	"The People of the Plains"; Transliteration: "Sōgen no Tami" (Japanese: 草原の民)	October 28, 2012	November 8, 2013
5	5	"Dungeon Capturer"; Transliteration: "Danjon Kōryakusha" (Japanese: 迷宮攻略者)	November 4, 2012	November 15, 2013
6	6	"Warrior Tribe Fanalis"; Transliteration: "Sentō Minzoku Fanarisu" (Japanese: 戦闘民族ファナリス)	November 11, 2012	November 22, 2013
7	7	"His Name is Sinbad"; Transliteration: "Sono Na wa Shindobaddo" (Japanese: その名はシンドバッド)	November 18, 2012	November 29, 2013
8	8	"A Broken Promise"; Transliteration: "Mamorenai yakusoku" (Japanese: 守れない約束)	November 25, 2012	December 6, 2013
9	9	"A Prince's Duty"; Transliteration: "Ōji no Sekinin" (Japanese: 王子の責任)	December 2, 2012	December 13, 2013
10	10	"His Name is Judar"; Transliteration: "Sono Na wa Judaru" (Japanese: その名はジュダル)	December 9, 2012	December 20, 2013
11	11	"A New Visitor"; Transliteration: "Arata naru Raihōsha" (Japanese: 新たなる来訪者)	December 16, 2012	December 27, 2013
12	12	"Determination and Separation"; Transliteration: "Ketsui to Ketsubetsu" (Japanese: 決意と決別)	December 23, 2012	January 3, 2014
13	13	"Prince of Rebellion"; Transliteration: "Hangyaku no Ōji" (Japanese: 反逆の王子)	January 6, 2013	January 10, 2014
14	14	"Alibaba's Answer"; Transliteration: "Aribaba no Kotae" (Japanese: アリババの答え)	January 13, 2013	January 17, 2014
15	15	"Cassim's Answer"; Transliteration: "Kashimu no Kotae" (Japanese: カシムの答え)	January 20, 2013	January 24, 2014
16	16	"Wisdom of Solomon"; Transliteration: "Soromon no Chie" (Japanese: ソロモンの知恵)	January 27, 2013	January 31, 2014
17	17	"Smile"; Transliteration: "Egao" (Japanese: 笑顔)	February 3, 2013	February 7, 2014
18	18	"The Kingdom of Sindria"; Transliteration: "Shindoria Ōkoku" (Japanese: シンドリア王国)	February 10, 2013	February 14, 2014
19	19	"The Culprit's Name is Sinbad"; Transliteration: "Hoshi no Na wa Shindobaddo" (Japanese: ホシの名はシンドバッド)	February 17, 2013	February 21, 2014
20	20	"The Two Princes"; Transliteration: "Ōji to Ōji" (Japanese: 王子と皇子)	February 24, 2013	February 21, 2014
21	21	"Zagan Labyrinth"; Transliteration: "Meikyū Zagan" (Japanese: 迷宮ザガン)	March 3, 2013	February 28, 2014
22	22	"Household of Flames"; Transliteration: "Honō no Kenzoku" (Japanese: 炎の眷属)	March 10, 2013	February 28, 2014
23	23	"Battle Cry"; Transliteration: "Toki no Koe" (Japanese: 鬨の声)	March 17, 2013	March 7, 2014
24	24	"Fall into Depravity"; Transliteration: "Daten" (Japanese: 堕転)	March 24, 2013	March 7, 2014
25	25	"Alibaba and Aladdin"; Transliteration: "Aribaba to Arajin" (Japanese: アリババとアラジン)	March 31, 2013	March 14, 2014

=== Magi: The Kingdom of Magic (2013–14) ===
No. overall	No. in season	Title	Original release date
26	1	"Premonition of a Journey"; Transliteration: "Tabidachi no Yokan" (Japanese: 旅立ちの予感)	October 6, 2013
27	2	"Journey"; Transliteration: "Tabidachi" (Japanese: 旅立ち)	October 13, 2013
28	3	"Setting Sail"; Transliteration: "Shukkō" (Japanese: 出航)	October 20, 2013
29	4	"Pirates"; Transliteration: "Kaizoku" (Japanese: 海賊)	October 27, 2013
30	5	"Mother"; Transliteration: "Haha" (Japanese: 母)	November 3, 2013
31	6	"A Kind Person"; Transliteration: "Yasashii Hito" (Japanese: 優しい人)	November 10, 2013
32	7	"Kouha Ren Appears"; Transliteration: "Ren Kōha Tōjō" (Japanese: 練紅覇登場)	November 17, 2013
33	8	"Days of Training"; Transliteration: "Tokkun no Hibi" (Japanese: 特訓の日々)	November 24, 2013
34	9	"The Reim Empire"; Transliteration: "Rēmu Teikoku" (Japanese: レーム帝国)	December 1, 2013
35	10	"The High Priestess"; Transliteration: "Saikō Shisai" (Japanese: 最高司祭)	December 8, 2013
36	11	"The Great Rift"; Transliteration: "Dai Kyōkoku" (Japanese: 大峡谷)	December 15, 2013
37	12	"A New Emperor"; Transliteration: "Aratanaru Kōtei" (Japanese: 新たなる皇帝)	December 22, 2013
38	13	"Titus Alexius"; Transliteration: "Titosu Arekiusu" (Japanese: ティトス・アレキウス)	January 5, 2014
39	14	"The Hidden Citizens"; Transliteration: "Kakusareta Tami" (Japanese: 隠された民)	January 12, 2014
40	15	"The Magicians' Country"; Transliteration: "Madōshi no Kuni" (Japanese: 魔導士の国)	January 19, 2014
41	16	"Remaining Life"; Transliteration: "Nokosareta Inochi" (Japanese: 残された命)	January 26, 2014
42	17	"Declaration of War"; Transliteration: "Sensen Fukoku" (Japanese: 宣戦布告)	January 26, 2014
43	18	"Reim's Threat"; Transliteration: "Rēmu no Kyōi" (Japanese: レームの脅威)	February 2, 2014
44	19	"A Real Magi"; Transliteration: "Honmono no Magi" (Japanese: 本物のマギ)	February 9, 2014
45	20	"Reunion"; Transliteration: "Saikai" (Japanese: 再会)	February 23, 2014
46	21	"The King Vessel"; Transliteration: "Ō no Utsuwa" (Japanese: 王の器)	March 2, 2014
47	22	"The Things I Want to Protect"; Transliteration: "Mamoritai Mono" (Japanese: 守りたいもの)	March 9, 2014
48	23	"The Djinn Warriors"; Transliteration: "Masō Senshi-tachi" (Japanese: 魔装戦士たち)	March 16, 2014
49	24	"Time of Destruction"; Transliteration: "Metsubō no Toki" (Japanese: 滅亡の時)	March 23, 2014
50	25	"Welcome Home"; Transliteration: "Okaerinasai" (Japanese: おかえりなさい)	March 30, 2014

== See also ==
- List of Magi: The Labyrinth of Magic characters
