= Origami Warriors =

Taiwanese comic book created by Jhou Sian-Zong

- First volume cover, featuring Wang Jhih-Jher, Red Sky Dragon and Dragon spirit.

摺紙戰士
- Genre: Superhero, Science fiction
- Author: Jhou Sian-Zong
- Publisher: Ching Win (Taiwan)
- Volumes: 22 (Original series); 19 (Origami Fighters G); 13 (Origami Fighters A)

Origami Warriors (Taiwanese translation: Origami Fighters, Chinese: 摺紙戰士) is a Taiwanese comic book created by Jhou Sian-Zong and published by the Ching Win Company. This comic series includes the original series serialized in 1995, published volume in 1996 and 22 volumes in total, then Origami Fighters G published volume in 2003 and 19 volumes in total, and Origami Fighters A published volume in 2019 and 13 volumes in total. It also released two one volume side stories Origami Fighters X (2009) and Origami Fighters F (2014), and two independent short stories Origami Q Fighters (one volume) and Origami Fighters W (digital only, it's full color comic).

An animated adaptation, with significant differences, was created by a Korean studio. Reminiscent of 2000's "monster collecting" anime, including a cast akin to the archetypes that would appear in said shows. An English dub for the adaptation was later made by Vitello Productions, and featured voice actors notable for roles in American cartoons. The dub, however, was scarcely distributed.

== Plot ==
=== Original series ===
The story begins one night, a mysterious archaeologist Dakr Wolf comes to visit Jher's dad, but was attacked by an Origami Fighter who claimed to be a member of Black League, then Dakr also transformed into the Origami Fighter and defeated him. This was the first time Jher and his parents knew about Origami Fighters.

Jher accidentally found an origami manual and some paper left behind by Dakr, and took them to school to share with his friends Lian and Su Dai-Zhi.They summoned the origami spirits, the Flower, Crane, and Dragon spirits, but were chased by an Origami Fighter of Black League. In order to save themselves, Jher made a contract with the Dragon spirit and transformed into the Origami Fighter Red Sky Dragon. Later, Su Dai-Zhi and Lian also transformed into Violet Crane and Yellow Flower Fairy, and Pizi, their classmate and Miss Lyu, their teacher were also involved in the incidents. Then Kuang Long, the son of the chief of Black League also join them.

The purpose of Black League is to rule the world through the power of the Spirit World, where the origami spirits live and the magic of Origami Fighters comes from. Therefore, Jher and the others fight against Black League. However, in the first decisive battle, they were still defeated by the chief of Black League who transforms into Golden Dragon Emperor, and then he went to the Spirit World.

When they woke up a few months later, the world had changed dramatically. A large number of Origami Fighter-turned-monsters appeared on the Earth. They were discovered to have invaded Earth from five ruins around the world. The Black League plan to connect online the Spirit World to the five ruins and trigger the sealing light ball, this will cause large-scale destruction of the ruins and the surrounding areas, with it will also allow the Spirit World to appear on Earth. After a series of arduous battles, Jher and the others successfully traveled from the last ruins to the Spirit World.

They were shocked to discover that the Spirit World is actually located on the moon. The Origami Fighters and related system are actually products of ancient civilization Dragon People Clan. Because the genetic monsters they were trying to create got out of control, they taking the entire Spirit World to the moon and using the heat of the atmosphere to destroy the monsters, however they ended up staying on the moon and becoming extinct. The Black League plan to bring the Spirit World return to the Earth under the guidance of the five ruins, but this will cause the moon to hit the Earth and trigger mass extinction while they only have days left to stop it.

At the same time they accidentally discovered Stunning Color system, the last product left by the Dragon People Clan. Through this system Jher successfully transformed into Stunning Color Sky Dragon. With the help of the United Earth Forces, they successfully restrained Black League. However, because they shut down the power reactor of moon, this gave the eight magic gods (six elemental gods and the Spirit God and Spirit Demon), who were bound by the Dragon People Clan to the Spirit World, the opportunity to merge into one and restore their true giant body and memory, Chaos God, and heading straight towards the Earth.

Despite turning off its power reactor, the moon continues to approach Earth. They could only rely on Jher's dad who transforms into Silver Battle Mouse to use special magic to open the dimensional gate and use gravity to attract the moon back to its original orbit. This eventually led to Jher's parents disappearing into the dimension.

The Chaos God lurked on Earth for a year in order to reshape human civilization. Jher and Kuang Long fight on the front lines, then the others also went to the front lines to support them after obtaining the prototype Stunning Color armors which made by the United Earth Forces. They finally broke through the defense line, approached Chaos God's base, and started a fierce battle with Dark Demon Dragon Emperor, who was the chief of Black League was transformed into a cyborg by Chaos God. Finally Kuang Long sadly hit Dark Demon Dragon Emperor's soul storage device, causing him to lose his soul.

Then Chaos God began to absorb the power of the sealing light ball of five ruins and planned to start transforming the world. After everyone fought hard, Stunning Color Sky Dragon's power awakened, which this system was designed to fight Chaos God, and stopped his plan, but they were also almost completely wiped out. At this moment, many "Chaos Gods" crossed over from the dimensional space and cured Jher and the others. It turns out that they are the spiritual beings from the same dimensional as Chaos God, who is actually a professor and is trying to influence other dimensions with technology, so he is being hunted.

In the end these giant spiritual beings destroyed most of the ancient civilization ruins including the Spirit World of moon, that Chaos God had left behind. In order to find Jher's parents and restore Lian's memory (Since Lian had been resurrected from the dead before, she lost her memory about Jher), Jher and Lian also went to their dimension. They were told that due to the different flow rates of time, they might not be able to return to Earth in the short term.

Twenty-five years later, Stunning Color Sky Dragon became the legend hero of saving the world. Humanity once again used the remaining data to develop a new origami system. Origami Fighters also moved towards a new generation.

=== Origami Fighters G (Generation) ===
Twenty-five years after experiencing the catastrophic event known as the Great Destruction, human civilization was re-established. However, since the remaining Origami Fighters of Black League and their descendants turned into the beast humans and attacked ordinary people from time to time, the United Earth Forces still tried to control this.

Yi Zhang-Zhi, a young man from a remote mountain village who just graduated from the police academy and went to check in at the police station in the metropolitan Newborn City. He was assigned to the seventh squad of the Stunning Color Police department, as known as Origami Fighters. In addition to Yi, the members of the seventh squad also include Li Yan, the captain this squad and can summon the swallow spirit, and Bi Sheng, the senior of the same age who came in earlier than Yi.

The mission of this department is to deal with incidents related to the beast humans. At first they thought the beast humans all were thugs, but that didn't seem to be the case. On the other hand, an organization called Dark Victory is secretly active and trying to rally the beast humans to confront the United Earth Forces.

=== Origami Fighters X and Origami Fighters F (side stories) ===
This series also published two one volume side stories Origami Fighters X (X-Files) and Origami Fighters F (Forever Young). These two stories follow the ends of the original series and Origami Fighters G respectively.

Origami Fighters X tells of Jher and Lian returning to the ancient earth through the Reverse Dimension, when the Dragon People Clan was still prosperous and the Stunning Color system was first created. Lian also got the origami of Stunning Color Flying Phoenix. And Origami Fighters F tells of how several years after Yi and Xiao-Die disappeared, Bi Sheng, who became the Red Wandering Dragon to protect the Newborn City, and Lian, who accidentally traveled back to Earth, investigated a conspiracy to fuse plant and animal genes to achieve immortality.

== Concept ==
Origami Fighters in the original series are super fighters formed by the fusion of human and origami spirit when they made a contract. After merging with spirit, they will also become the potential beast human (including plant fighters). Then in Origami Fighters G, Origami Fighters generally refer to people who use origami armor and summon spirit to use magic to fight. Although there is no need to fuse with spirit, the main characters are the descendants of beast humans, or modified beast humans and possess beast human genes.

In the original series, Origami Fighters are divided into twelve levels based on the color of the Origami Transformation Talisman. From highest to lowest are gold, silver, black, grey, white, red, orange, yellow, green, blue, indigo, and violet. If a low-level Origami Fighter defeats a high-level Origami Fighter, the low-level one will be promoted to the opponent's level. If an Origami Fighter is defeated by an ordinary person, the Origami Fighter's spirit will be transferred to the ordinary person. After an Origami Fighter is defeated, their origami will be left behind, and their body and soul will be transported to the Spirit World (The Spirit World ceased to function after it was destroyed).

Colors other than the twelve colors are the Origami Gadget Talisman.These can be used to summon any origami gadgets, weapons, means of transport, or guardians (usually as giant robots), except dragon head origami which only for use with Fighter Transformation Talisman / the origami for summoning spirit. The Gadget Talisman can be disassembled and reused and the Fighter Transformation Origami cannot be changed once it is folded complete.

In Origami Fighters G, since the Spirit World was destroyed, they first used the new Stunning Color system with no color levels, later they used the Rainbow system that included only seven color levels. The magic of original Stunning Color system (Stunning Color Sky Dragon and Stunning Color Flying Phoenix) still had twelve color levels.

Origami Fighters' magic are divided into six element, fire, water, wind, earth, wood and electric, and the Spirit God and Spirit Demon have their own special magic sacred magic and dark magic.

== Characters ==
=== Original series ===
==== Main characters ====
Wang Zhi-Zher / Wang Jhih-Jher (王志哲)

The main protagonist. His nickname is Jher (小哲 Xiao-Zher). He was a fifth-grade elementary school student at the beginning. He is good at running, not good at origami but learns quickly. His hobby is playing video games and often plays with his dad.

He always has a headband on his head, it was later revealed that the headband is actually the Stunning Color Transformation Talisman. Because of this, Kuang Long initially thought Jher was his lost old brother. Although Jher is healthy now, he was once so sick that he had to have a heart transplant as a child. In a car accident, Jher's parents received a mysterious cloth with ancient writings – the Stunning Color Transformation Talisman from Kuang Long's half-brother's biological father, and Jher received Kuang Long's half-brother's heart transplant.

He has a cheerful and optimistic personality. He was depressed and gloomy for a while after his parents disappeared, then he cheered up after learning that there was a chance to find his parents.

Although another sixty or seventy years passed after he left the Earth, due to the different passage of time, he still remains around fourteen or fifteen years old.

His name 志哲 meaning "ambition" and "philosophy", while is also the inverted homonym of 摺紙 (zher-zhi, origami), and combined with his surname 王 (Wang, king), it's homonym of "origami king".

- Origami Fighter species: Legendary animals
- Elemental power (Magic type): Fire
- Fighter's special ability: Instant acceleration
- Spirit: Sky Dragon (天龍) (Dragon spirit) (in original series), Dragon spirit (a new one, in Origami Fighters A)
- Transformation: Red Sky Dragon (紅色天龍) → Violet Sky Dragon (紫色天龍) → Black Sky Dragon (黑色天龍) → Stunning Color Sky Dragon (絕色天龍) → Red Sky Dragon (Evolution forme, in Origami Fighters A) → Phantom Color Sky Dragon (幻色天龍) (in Origami Fighters A)

Zeng Li-Lian (曾麗蓮)

Jher's childhood friend. Her nickname is Lian (小蓮 Xiao-Lian), meaning "lotus". She is a gentle and kind girl. As a doctor's daughter, she is good at treatment.

When she and Jher were young, Jher's mom gave Lian a replica cloth similar to Jher's as a hair accessory due to the whim of both parents.

She can use powerful wood magic of healing, even can save people who are dying. During an underwater battle, the Black Giant Whale, a member of Black League, was accidentally transformed into a beast, causing him to lose control and kill Lian. Later in the Spirit World, Jher resurrected her, but without the Spirit God's consent, she lost her memory about Jher and personality changed to slightly rude and strong, while over time it neutralized with some of her previous personality.

Despite losing the memory about Jher, she still cared more about Jher, which makes Su Dai-Zhi sometime a little jealous. (Jher had the same idea when he saw her intimate interaction with Su Dai-Zhi.)

- Origami Fighter species: Plants (in original series)
- Elemental power (Magic type): Wood
- Fighter's special ability: Cures physical wounds
- Spirit: Lily (莉莉) (Flower spirit) (in original series), Horn Phoenix spirit (in Origami Fighters A)
- Transformation: Yellow Flower Fairy (黃色花仙) → White Flower Fairy (白色花仙) → Stunning Color Flower Fairy (絕色花仙) (armor forme) → Stunning Color Flying Phoenix (絕色飛鳳) (in Origami Fighters X) → Phantom Color Horn Phoenix (幻色犄鳳) (in Origami Fighters A)

Su Dai-Zhi (蘇代止)

Jher and Lian's childhood friend. His nickname is Shudaizi (書呆子, meaning "bookworm", a homonym of Su Dai-Zhi). He is not good at sport but is good at analyzing and organizing information and has a wealth of knowledge. In the beginning, since violet is the lowest level color, he uses origami armor to enhance his abilities.

His mom died when he was a child. Because of his dad's strict with him and persistent attitude towards work, he once hated his dad and soldier. After discovering that his dad had turned into the Experimental Subject monster by Wu Qing, he almost died trying to protect his dad. Fortunately, he was saved by Lian's healing magic.

He has a crush on Lian, but knows that Lian cared more about Jher, so he silently by her side and take care of her parents when she leaves Earth.

- Origami Fighter species: Birds
- Elemental power (Magic type): Wind
- Fighter's special ability: Flight and enables others to fly
- Spirit: Bert (伯特) (Crane spirit)
- Transformation: Violet Crane (紫色靈鶴) → Orange Crane (橙色靈鶴) → Black Crane (黑色靈鶴) → Stunning Color Crane (絕色靈鶴) (armor forme)

Bi Zhi (畢直)

Jher and the others's classmate. His nickname is Pizi (痞子, meaning "ruffian", a homonym of Bi Zhi, while it has a bit of a humorous meaning here). His personality is greedy for petty gains, love money, afraid of trouble, and good at runaway, which his family seems to be like this too. He mainly serves as a gag character. His body looks a bit bloated, but it's actually because he has a lot of stuff stuffed to put on body.

He didn't have transformation origami for most of the first half, but he can summon the Guardian Origami Fada, a giant drivable robot to join the battle. After arriving in the Spirit World, he found the golden Transformation Talisman and transformed into Golden Wandering Dragon. Since the Golden Wandering Dragon has a special ability that can automatically evade any attack, he did not replace it with the Stunning Color system.

At first he thought Yi-Shan was a weird girl, then he began to care about her unconsciously. Finally he married Yi-Shan and had a son Bi Sheng. Due to he transformed into Golden Wandering Dragon, he has the dragon beast human gene, and because of this, even after decades he still looks younger than his actual age (in Origami Fighters A).

- Elemental power (Magic type): Water
- Transformation: Golden Wandering Dragon (金色遊龍)

Kuang Long (狂龍)

Son of the chief of Black League. His personality is stubborn and goes his own way. After knowing that his father hated his mother, which caused his mother to be depressed before her death, he decided to fight against Black League.

He is obsessed with Miss Lyu because he thinks Miss Lyu looks like his mother, because of this, he often bickers with Dakr unilaterally. He once mistakenly thought Jher was his lost old brother and was disappointed when he knew the truth. He often uses origami flying saucer as his transportation.

Even though he rebelled against his father, he still loved him and saw him and Fu-Wan as the only people he cared about, and the others were just taking advantage of him, even though he did share revolutionary feelings with them. He tried to trust his father but eventually broke up with him and was considered a betrayer by his father. After his father was transformed into the Dark Demon Dragon Emperor, he didn't want to hurt him, but in the end he was forced to destroy his soul storage devicethe, causing him to lose his soul.

His name 狂龍 meaning "wild dragon".

- Elemental power (Magic type): Fire
- Transformation: Black Wild Dragon (黑色狂龍)

Dakr Wolf (達克·沃夫)

Dakr is an archaeologist, who accidentally learns of Black League's plans and decides to stop them. He is an old acquaintance with Jher's dad. He has the ability to recover quickly, and when he transformed into beast, his sensory abilities were greatly enhanced. Due to the influence of spirit (beast) cells, he will turn into a werewolf on a full moon night. Later, due to being captured by Black League, he lost his beast cells along with most of the main characters.

Eventually he married Miss Lyu and adopted Kuang Long and Bell.

His name is a transcription of the word "dark".

- Elemental power (Magic type): Electric
- Transformation: Blue Werewolf (藍色狼人) → Green Werewolf (綠色狼人) → Grey Lightning Wolf (閃電灰狼) → Stunning Color Running Wolf (絕色奔狼) (armor forme)

Lyu Mei-Si (呂美斯) / Miss Lyu (呂老師, meaning "Teacher Lyu")

Jher and the others' teacher. She is a person with a sense of justice and care about her students. When she met Dakr for the first time, she had a good impression of him. As the plot develops, they gradually fall in love.

At first she didn't have transformation origami. In an accident, she defeated the Green Off-road Bunny, a member of Black League, with the origami gadget she summoned, so the Rabbit spirit of Green Off-road Bunny was transferred to her. Later she made a contract with the Rabbit spirit and transformed into White Off-road Bunny (Due to the Rabbit spirit defeated the White Hummingbird, it was promoted to the white level).

Eventually she married Dakr and went with him to Antarctica for archeology.

- Elemental power (Magic type): Earth
- Transformation: White Off-road Bunny (白色越野兔) → Black Off-road Bunny (黑色越野兔) → Stunning Color Off-road Bunny (絕色越野兔) (armor forme)

Yi-Shan (宜珊)

A short and round girl. Originally one of Heliu's subordinate in Black League, then she was swallowed by the sealing light ball of the ruins. Later in the Spirit World, in order to resurrect Lian, Jher accidentally resurrected her too, who lost her memory, so she joined them. She liked Pizi and fell in love with him at first sight. She was also the only person who could understand Pizi.

When everyone was captured by Black League, she was forcibly transformed into a plant beast. After that, she turned into a tree and lived in the Spirit World. A year later, for unknown reasons (Maybe it's because Pizi kept talking to her during this year), she transformed into a human again from the fruit of this tree and retain her personality and memory (but lost her origami). She becomes a beast human whose body is made of plant cells and can turn her hands and feet into vines.

Finally she married Pizi and had a son Bi Sheng. Due to her beast human gene, she has become long-lived and looks younger than her actual age (in Origami Fighters A).

- Elemental power (Magic type): Wood
- Transformation: Yellow Sunflower (黃色向日葵) → Orange Sunflower (橙色向日葵) → Red Sunflower (紅色向日葵) → Plant beast human

Bell (貝兒)

Bell is a young girl who as a new one after Bellter resurrected and no original memory. She considered Dakr and Miss Lyu her parents because they were the first people she saw after her resurrection. She could have been resurrected to her original age, but because the resurrection flame was extinguished (because it burned Dakr), she was only resurrected to the age of a young girl.

She has a crush on Jher, and sometimes gets a little jealous of each other with Lian. When she grew up, she became a jewelry merchant.

- Elemental power (Magic type): Wind
- Transformation: Silver Breaking-sky Phoenix (破空銀鳳) → Stunning Color Wonder Phoenix (絕色神鳳) (armor forme)

==== Others ====
Wang Dong-Dian (王動殿) / Dr. Wang (王博士)

Jher's dad. He is a doctor about computer engineering. His hobby is playing video games, and also design games.

After entering the Spirit World, he was possessed by the Spirit Demon and transformed into Silver Battle Mouse.

His name 王動殿 is the inverted homonym of 電動王 (dian dong wang, video game king).

Silver Battle Mouse's look is based on Top Sky Mouse (通天鼠 Tong Tian Shu), a character from Jhou Sian-Zong's the other comic "The Legend of the Beast King" (獸王傳說).

- Transformation: Silver Battle Mouse (銀色戰鼠)

Li Mei-Yu (李美玉)

Jher's mom. A housewife with a fiery temper, and as known as "Fiery Pepper". Despite this, she also has a tender and loving side to Jher.

After entering the Spirit World, because Silver Battle Mouse threatened her with Jher's dad's personal safety, she had no choice but to join Black League and transformed into Violet Cloud Owl. In order to prevent Jher from intervening, she used her special skill to take away Jher's red level and turn him into violet level.

- Transformation: Violet Cloud Owl (紫色雲梟) → Red Cloud Owl (紅色雲梟)

Wu Qing (吳擎)

The captain of Police Tactical Unit, later the commander in chief of United Earth Forces / Asia Division. He is a character who is both good and evil.

His name 吳擎 is a homonym of 無情 (wu-qing, ruthless).

- Transformation: Silver Fighting Snake (銀色鬥蛇)

Su Bu-Qi (蘇步棋)

Su Dai-Zhi's dad who as a general. He was strict with Su Dai-Zhi but actually loved him. He was so dedicated to his work that he didn't get to see his wife for the last time. He sacrificed himself to help Jher and the others escape from Wu Qing, but didn't actually die. He was transformed by Wu Qing into the Experimental Subject, a genetic monster with spirit cells.

His name 蘇步棋 is a homonym of 輸不起 (shu bu qi, can't afford to lose), and 步棋 means that his status as a soldier and acts as a chess piece.

==== Black League ====
Kuang Yan-Yi-Lang (狂炎一郎, since it is Japanese name, its Japanese pronunciation is probably Kyo Enichiro)

The chief of Black League.

- Transformation: Golden Dragon Emperor (金色龍皇) → Dark Demon Dragon Emperor (闇魔龍皇)

Black Rose (黑玫瑰)

The deputy chief of Black League. Because she wanted to get close to the chief, Kuang Long against her. At first she didn't have transformation origami, so she used the origami armor and gadgets to fight Kuang Long and the others. Later she got the rose origami can transform into Black Rose (黑色玫瑰) and use wood magic. Finally she was defeated by Kuang Long.

Heliu (希留)

One of three major bodyguards of Black League. He is an assassin and a playboy. He can transform into White Flying Dragon (白色飛龍) and use water magic. He and Jher had a duel at the ruins, then he loses control to turning into a beast and was swallowed by the sealing light ball of the ruins, but didn't die immediately. Finally, Lian used vines to immobilize him so that he could not escape from the light ball. Although his origami is a flying dragon, his fighter species is not dragon, but dinosaur species.

Bellter (蓓兒特)

The one of three major bodyguards of Black League, and Dakr's ex-girlfriend. She can transform into Silver Breaking-sky Phoenix and use wind magic.

Leo (里歐)

The one of three major bodyguards of Black League. He can transform into Grey Earth Lion (大地灰獅) and use earth magic. Later he can transforms into the Multiple Experimental Subject, combine the power of three origami Grey Earth Lion, Red Hawk and Violet Poisonous Snake, and can use earth, wind and electric three type magic.

Fu-Wan (福丸, its Japanese pronunciation is probably Fukumaru)

Kuang Long's nanny. He can transform into Orange Dream Butterfly (橙色夢蝶).

=== Origami Fighters G ===
==== Main characters ====
Yi Zhang-Zhi (易章旨)

The main protagonist in Origami Fighters G. His nickname is his surname Yi (小易 Xiao-Yi). He is fifteen years old at the beginning. His surname comes from his mom. The member of the seventh squad of the police station in Newborn City (also known as Stunning Color Police or Origami Fighters) and the special teams of the United Earth Forces. His father is Kuang Long.

His name 易章旨 is the homonym of 一張紙 (yi zhang zhi, a piece of paper).

- Beast human species: Dragon
- Elemental power (Magic type): Fire
- Spirit: Dragon spirit (in Origami Fighters G)

Li Yan (李燕)

The captain of the seventh squad. She is eighteen years old at the beginning. Due to personal experience, she hates beast humans. So when she later found out that she is also a partial beast human (descendant of ordinary human and beast human), she was shocked.

Her name 燕 meaning "swallow".

- Beast human species: Swallow (partial beast human)
- Elemental power (Magic type): Wind
- Spirit: Swallow spirit (in Origami Fighters G)

Hua Xiao-Die (華曉蝶)

Her name 蝶 meaning "butterfly", and her surname 華 can refer to 花 (hua, flower) or 華麗 (gorgeous).

- Beast human species: Butterfly (modified beast human)
- Elemental power (Magic type): Earth
- Spirit: Butterfly spirit (in Origami Fighters G)

Bi Sheng (畢勝)

Son of Bi Zhi and Yi-Shan. His nickname is his surname Bi (小畢 Xiao-Bi). He has a similar build to his parents but has long black hair. He has both dragon and plant beast human genes from his parents.

His name 畢勝 is the homonym of 必勝 (bi sheng, certain victory).

- Beast human species: Dragon / Plant
- Elemental power (Magic type): Wood (in Origami Fighters G), Fire (in Origami Fighters F)
- Spirit: Flower spirit (sunflower / seed) (in Origami Fighters G), Strange Dragon spirit (in Origami Fighters F)

==== Others ====
Chou Yun (仇雲)

The director of the police station in Newborn City.

Chen Lan (陳蘭)

Bi Sheng's girl friend.

==== Dark Victory ====
Shadow (夏鐸) / The leader

== Animated adaptation ==
An animated television series based on the comic book was produced by Dong Woo Animation and debuted in Taiwan in 2004. It aired in Japan on TV Tokyo in 2005; and in 2006, it became the first Taiwanese cartoon shown on South Korean television when it premiered on SBS. The staff include animators from Hong Kong, Japan and South Korea.

Beside borrowing the idea of origami from the comic series, the story and characters of the animation series are greatly altered. Instead of combining with their Genies to become Origami Warriors, the characters simply summon their Genies. Also, instead of the various adventures and the results of world war in the original series, the characters are all competitors of the "Origami Combat Competition". The character designs are also more contemporary of 2000s anime rather than the manhua's style, reminiscent of 1990s manga. The series is also less violent than the original source material.

The first episode was dubbed into English in 2008 by Vitello Productions as a sales pilot, which localized character names, had new music and featured the voices of Rob Paulsen, Kath Soucie and Cam Clarke. This English dubbed episode was available on Toon Goggles, until 2017.

=== Characters ===
Wang Zhi-Zher / Wang Jhih-Jher (王志哲, ワン・ジージェ Wan Jīje) / Rico

Voiced by: Wang Ji-Cheol (Korean), Rob Paulsen (English)

Zeng Li-Lian (曾麗蓮, ゼン・リーリャン Zen Rīrian) / Jasmine

Voiced by: Jeong Yeo-Rin (Korean), Kath Soucie (English)

Su Dai-Zhi (蘇代止, スー・タイジ Sū Daiji) / Atticus

Voiced by: Seo Dae-Jin (Korean), Cam Clarke (English)

Bi Zhi (畢直, ブルタンク Burutanku) / Korean: Toongi (퉁이)

DaKr / Dark (達克, ダーキー Dākī) / Hyeon, Dal-Kook (현달국, 玄達國)

Kuang Long (狂龍, マシュー・クァン Mashū Kuan) / Kwang Yong (광룡, 狂龍)

=== Staff ===
- Original work: "Origami Warriors" by Jhou Sian-Zong (周顯宗)
- Production: Origami Warriors Committee
- Setting: Jo Jang Hee/Junki Takegami
- Brochure: Kim Eon Jeong/Yasuo Shizuya, Sakachi Ohashi, Takashi Yamada, Tadashi Hayakawa
- Character design: Wi Hyeon Soo/Hiroyuki Taiga, Matsushita Hiromi/Kazuko Tadano
- Artwork: Jang Yoon cheol/Katsuhiro Hashi
- Color design: Lee Seon ho/Rumiko Nagai
- Technical director: Nam Goong jin
- Marketing: Han Jeong Hoon, Kim Eun Joo, Bak Chung Seok, Kook Yeong Ja
- Advertising: Bae Seon Yeong
- Web-based creators: Yoon Joon yeong/Jeong In Soo
- Design: Song Cheong Hwa/Moon Se Rim
- Creative producers: Lee Kyeong Sook/Kim Jae Young/Kwon Yeong Sook
- Producers: Kwon Ho Jin/Seong Ha Mook/No Jeong Hyeon
- Animation production: Hong Jemina/Kang Seok Woo, Kim Jeong Kyoo/An Yoo Seop
- Directors: Park Woo Hyun/Ami Tomobuki

=== Music ===
The opening and ending themes are performed by TVXQ.

"Free your mind"

- Song composer: Kim Yeong Hoo
- Music composer: Kim Yeong Hoo/William Pyeon
- Lab creation: Brian Joo
- Vocals: TVXQ

"Your LOVE is all I need"

- Song composer: Steven "SJ" Lee
- Music composer: JoJo Bee
- Vocals: DBSK

== Reception ==
Origami Warriors won the 2002 award for most popular children's comic from the Chinese Publishers' Foundation and the Comic Artist Labor Union in Taipei.
