= Vitello Productions =

American entertainment company

Vitello Productions, Inc.
- Type: Privately owned company
- Industry: Entertainment
- Headquarters: Burbank, California
- Key people: Paul Vitello
- Website: www.vitello.com

Vitello Productions, Inc., formerly called Vitello & Associates, Inc., is a company based in Burbank, California founded in 1984 that provides services for live action movies as well as cartoons, such as picture and sound editing.

== Work ==
Anime dubs producer

- Crayon Shin-chan - First 52-episode English dub, only aired in Europe and Latin America
- Finding Paradiso - Sales pilot
- Origami Warriors - Sales pilot

Post production producer

- Popeye and Son
- Garbage Pail Kids (TV series)
- The New Adventures of Winnie the Pooh (select episodes in the first and second seasons)
- The Cramp Twins
- Mr. Bogus
- Nine Dog Christmas
- He's a Bully, Charlie Brown
- Captain Simian & the Space Monkeys
- Roswell Conspiracies: Aliens, Myths and Legends
- Bruno the Kid
- Fat Dog Mendoza

Sound effects

- Voltron
