= Lee Seung-joon (actor, born 1978) =

South Korean actor

- Born: April 23, 1978 (age 48); South Korea
- Occupation: Actor

Korean name
- Hangul: 이승준
- RR: I Seungjun
- MR: I Sŭngjun

Lee Seung-joon (born April 23, 1978) is a South Korean actor. Lee was among the non-mainstream, little-known actors who appeared in Project 577, a 2012 documentary about a cross-country trek from Seoul to Haenam. In 2014, he played his first starring role in a feature film in the indie Go, Stop, Murder, a fantasy thriller about Go-Stop gambling.

== Filmography ==
=== Film ===
Year	Title	Role	Notes
2006	How to Make a Motion Picture	Jeong-woo	short film
2007	Seongbuk Port	Kim In-bae	short film
2007	Ordinary People		short film
2008	Beastie Boys	Kang Hyeon-seong	
2008	The Good, the Bad, the Weird	member of Sam-gook's gang	
2008	Down to the Girl		short film
2009	A Worse Crime		short film
2011	Hideless	Choi Do-jin	
2012	Nameless Gangster: Rules of the Time	member of Pan-ho's gang	
2012	Project 577	Himself	documentary
2014	Go, Stop, Murder	Sang-i	

=== Television ===
Year	Title	Role
2008	HDTV Literature "My Bloody Valentine"	Mu-seong
