= Shōnen Onmyōji =

Japanese light novel series and its adaptations

- Cover of the light novel Shōnen Onmyōji, volume 1

少年陰陽師 (Shōnen Onmyōji)
- Genre: Coming-of-age, supernatural
- Light novel
- Written by: Mitsuru Yūki
- Illustrated by: Sakura Asagi (Vols. 1-42); Natsuo Ito (Vols. 43-present)
- Published by: Kadokawa Shoten
- Imprint: Kadokawa Beans Bunko
- Original run: 2001 – present
- Volumes: 56 (Including short stories and side story)
- Manga
- Written by: Hinako Seta
- Published by: Kadokawa Shoten
- Magazine: Monthly Asuka
- Original run: August 24, 2005 – 2005
- Volumes: 1
- Anime television series
- Directed by: Kunihiro Mori
- Produced by: Mitsuteru Shibata; Kenta Nishikawaji; Yasuyuki Ogawa; Yasutaka Hyūga
- Written by: Miya Asakawa
- Music by: Kou Nakagawa
- Studio: Studio Deen
- Licensed by: NA: Geneon
- Original network: KTV
- English network: SEA: Animax Asia
- Original run: October 3, 2006 – March 13, 2007
- Episodes: 26
- Manga

The Teen Exorcist
- Written by: Mitsuru Yūki
- Illustrated by: Shikiji Sorakura
- Published by: Kadokawa Shoten
- English publisher: NA: Yen Press
- Magazine: Young Ace
- Original run: January 2023 – present
- Volumes: 4
- Light novel

Onmyōji, Abe no Seimei
- Written by: Mitsuru Yūki
- Illustrated by: Sakura Asagi (Vols. 1-2); Nanatsuo Ito (Vols. 3-5)
- Published by: Akita Publishing
- Imprint: Kadokawa Beans Bunko
- Original run: July 31, 2010 – present
- Volumes: 5
- Manga

Onmyōji, Abe no Seimei
- Written by: Mitsuru Yūki
- Illustrated by: Arata Kawabata
- Published by: Kadokawa Shoten
- Magazine: Monthly Princess
- Original run: February 6, 2020 – October 16, 2024
- Volumes: 9

Shōnen Onmyōji (少年陰陽師) also known as The Teen Exorcist is a Japanese light novel series written by Mitsuru Yūki and illustrated by Sakura Asagi. The novel is serialized in Kadokawa Shoten's The Beans. The light novel has 56 volumes, including three short stories and a side story. A manga spin-off was serialized in Beans Ace.

There is also a series of drama CDs, a PlayStation 2 game and a manga adaptation that was announced in 2005 and a musical as well. Moreover, it was announced in August 2006 in Newtype that the anime adaptation would be animated by Studio Deen and the character design was to be done by Shinobu Tagashira. It began its broadcast on October 3, 2006.

The anime premiered on Animax Asia under the title Shōnen Onmyoji: The Young Spirit Master. It was aired across its respective networks worldwide, including Hong Kong, Taiwan, and Vietnam, with translations and dubbed versions for English language networks in Southeast Asia, South Asia, and other regions.

The anime was licensed for North American distribution by Geneon Entertainment. However, only three volumes of the series have been released, and have yet to receive a full release due to Geneon's departure from the American market. On July 3, 2008, Funimation announced that it had struck a deal with Geneon to distribute and release several of their licenses, including Shōnen Onmyōji.

== Plot ==
The protagonist of the series, which is set in the Heian era, is Abe no Masahiro, the grandson of the great onmyōji, Abe no Seimei, who passed his teachings on to his grandson. Unfortunately, Masahiro has lost his sixth sense and with it the ability to see spirits. Masahiro constantly feels overshadowed by his grandfather's fame.

One day, Masahiro meets a fox-like creature which he names Mokkun (もっくん) who shows him his true potential powers after fighting a demon. Mokkun is actually Tōda (騰蛇), who prefers to be called Guren. He is one of the twelve shikigami called the Shinshō (神将), who has pledged his loyalty to Seimei and is helping Masahiro to surpass his grandfather.

Masahiro's dream to surpass his grandfather will not be realized as easily as he hopes. Not only does he have to convince the other Shinshō that he is Seimei's true successor, he must also increase his power in order to stop demons coming from China, the other parts of Japan and the Underworld. In addition to this he has to deal with the schemes of rival onmyōji who want to destroy Japan not to mention keeping his promise to protect Princess Akiko of the Fujiwara clan.

== Story Arcs ==
In the novels, there are already 9 story arcs. However, the anime only covered two arcs, the Kyūki and Kazane Arc.

=== Kyūki Arc ===
The Kyūki Arc (窮奇編, Kyūki Hen) starts from episode 1 to 12 in the anime and volume 1 to 3 in the novel. Kyūki, a winged tiger from the West or to be precise, China has been forced to evacuate after being defeated by another demon.

He arrives in Japan and plans to eat Fujiwara no Akiko to replenish his spirit powers and heal his wounds. With him are an army of foreign demons, all unknown to the inexperienced and apprentice onmyōji Masahiro who has started to use his skills.

=== Kazane Arc ===
The Kazane Arc (風音編, Kazane Hen) starts from episode 13 to 26 in the anime and volume 4 to 7 in the novel.

A vengeful spirit has been summoned and has cursed Yukinari of the Fujiwara clan. A mysterious woman appears and tries to take Seimei's life.

Someone is trying to open the gate to the underworld, events from fifty-five years ago reoccur, and Guren as well as Masahiro must undergo the ultimate test.

=== Tenko Arc ===
The Tenko Arc (天狐編, Tenkō Hen) starts from volume 8 to 12 in the novel.

=== Kagami Arc ===
The Kagami Arc (珂神編, Kagami Hen) starts from volume 13 to 17 in the novel.

=== Tamayori Arc ===
The Tamayori Arc (玉依編, Tamayori Hen) starts from volumes 18 to 22 in the novel.

=== Soho Arc ===
The Soho Arc (颯峰編) starts from volumes 23 to 26 in the novel.

=== Kagome Arc ===
The Kagome Arc (籠目編, Kagome Hen) starts from volumes 27 to 31 in the novel.

=== Shiou Arc ===
The Shiou Arc (尸櫻編, Shikabane sakura (shi ō) Hen) starts from volumes 32 to in the novel.

== Media ==
=== Light novel ===
No.	Title	Japanese release date	Japanese ISBN
1	Shōnen Onmyōji: Search for the Shadow of the Foreign Country	December 26, 2001	978-4-04-441603-4
2	Shōnen Onmyōji: Shattering the Binding of the Curse of Darkness	April 27, 2002	978-4-04-441604-1
3	Shōnen Onmyōji: Penetrate the Mirror Cage	July 31, 2002	978-4-04-441605-8
4	Shōnen Onmyōji: Release the Catastrophic Chains	October 31, 2002	978-4-04-441608-9
5	Shōnen Onmyōji: Sleep Embraced by the Snow	January 30, 2003	978-4-04-441609-6
6	Shōnen Onmyōji: Chase the Wind That Invites the Underworld	April 25, 2003	978-4-04-441610-2
7	Shōnen Onmyōji: Sharpen the Sword of Flame	July 31, 2003	978-4-04-441611-9
8	Shōnen Onmyōji: Soar Through the Crimson Sky	January 30, 2004	978-4-04-441613-3
9	Shōnen Onmyōji: Point out the Light	May 29, 2004	978-4-04-441614-0
10	Shōnen Onmyōji: Cut Through the Curtain of Dark Night	September 30, 2004	978-4-04-441615-7
11	-	December 28, 2004	978-4-04-441616-4
12	-	June 30, 2005	978-4-04-441618-8
13	-	December 28, 2005	978-4-04-441620-1
14	-	June 30, 2006	978-4-04-441622-5
15	-	September 30, 2006	978-4-04-441623-2
16	-	January 31, 2007	978-4-04-441624-9
17	-	June 30, 2007	978-4-04-441627-0
18	-	January 31, 2008	978-4-04-441629-4
19	-	May 31, 2008	978-4-04-441630-0
20	-	August 1, 2008	978-4-04-441631-7
21	-	September 30, 2008	978-4-04-441632-4
22	-	January 31, 2009	978-4-04-441633-1
23	-	May 30, 2009	978-4-04-441634-8
24	-	September 30, 2009	978-4-04-441635-5
25	-	December 26, 2009	978-4-04-441636-2
26	-	March 31, 2010	978-4-04-441637-9
27	-	August 31, 2010	978-4-04-441640-9
28	-	January 29, 2011	978-4-04-441643-0
29	-	May 31, 2011	978-4-04-441647-8
30	-	September 30, 2011	978-4-04-441649-2
31	-	January 31, 2012	978-4-04-100160-8
32	-	June 30, 2012	978-4-04-100368-8
33	-	September 29, 2012	978-4-04-100506-4
34	-	February 28, 2013	978-4-04-100728-0
35	-	June 1, 2013	978-4-04-100869-0
36	-	October 1, 2013	978-4-04-101030-3
37	-	July 1, 2014	978-4-04-101661-9
38	-	October 1, 2014	978-4-04-101662-6
39	-	March 1, 2015	978-4-04-101663-3
40	-	July 1, 2015	978-4-04-103019-6
41	-	November 1, 2015	978-4-04-103020-2
42	-	November 1, 2016	978-4-04-104723-1
43	-	April 1, 2017	978-4-04-105412-3
44	-	October 1, 2017	978-4-04-105626-4
45	-	October 1, 2018	978-4-04-105628-8
46	-	October 1, 2019	978-4-04-108449-6

==== Spin-off ====
No.	Title	Japanese release date	Japanese ISBN
1	Shōnen Onmyōji: Wings, now return to heaven	April 28, 2007	978-4-04-441625-6

==== Short stories ====
No.	Title	Japanese release date	Japanese ISBN
1	Shōnen Onmyōji: A Song of Calming in a Dream of Reality	September 30, 2003	978-4-04-441612-6
2	-	September 30, 2005	978-4-04-441619-5
3	-	September 29, 2007	978-4-04-441628-7
4	-	June 30, 2010	978-4-04-441639-3
5	-	April 1, 2014	978-4-04-101311-3
6	-	July 1, 2016	978-4-04-103021-9
7	-	August 1, 2016	978-4-04-103944-1
1	-	November 1, 2017	978-4-04-105627-1
2	-	December 1, 2018	978-4-04-107511-1

==== Onmyōji, Abe no Seimei ====
No.	Title	Japanese release date	Japanese ISBN
1	-	July 30, 2010; March 23, 2013	978-4-04-874080-7; 978-4-04-100745-7
2	-	February 27, 2013; February 25, 2016	978-4-04-110389-0; 978-4-04-103615-0
3	-	February 28, 2015; August 25, 2020	978-4-04-101887-3; 978-4-04-109669-7
4	-	February 27, 2016	978-4-04-101886-6
5	-	July 28, 2017	978-4-04-105259-4

=== Manga ===
==== Onmyōji, Abe no Seimei ====
No.	Release date	ISBN
1	August 17, 2020	978-4-253-27381-7
2	February 16, 2021	978-4-253-27382-4
3	July 15, 2021	978-4-253-27383-1
4	December 16, 2021	978-4-253-27384-8
5	July 14, 2022	978-4-253-27385-5
6	January 16, 2023	978-4-253-27386-2
7	May 16, 2023	978-4-253-27387-9
8	March 14, 2024	978-4-253-27388-6
9	October 16, 2024	978-4-253-27389-3

==== Second manga ====
No.	Original release date	Original ISBN	English release date	English ISBN
1	June 2, 2023	978-4-04-113696-6	November 19, 2024	978-1-9753-9888-0
Seek Out the Strange Land's Shadows (異邦の影を探しだせ); The Face of a Flower Yet Unseen (まだ見ぬ花の顔); A Guardian Angel to Her Side (護りたい人のもとへ); For Whom the God Burns (燃ゆる神は誰が為に)
2	December 4, 2023	978-4-04-114130-4	April 22, 2025	979-8-8554-0646-7
For You (君がため); Foreign Shadows (異邦の影); Guren (紅蓮); The Future Is in Your Hands (未来拓くは己の手); Burning Desire (燃ゆる思ひ)
3	June 4, 2024	978-4-04-115000-9	September 23, 2025	979-8-8554-1538-4
4	December 4, 2024	978-4-04-115568-4	April 28, 2026	979-8-8554-2311-2
5	June 4, 2025	978-4-04-116172-2	April 27, 2027	979-8-8554-3859-8
6	December 4, 2025	978-4-04-116786-1	—	—

=== Anime ===
The opening theme is Egao no Wake (笑顔の訳, lit. 'The Meaning of Your Smile') by Kaori Hikita while the ending themes are Yakusoku (約束, lit. 'Promise') by Saori Kiuji and Rokutōsei (六等星, lit. 'Sixth-Magnitude Star') by Abe no Masahiro.

No.	Title	Directed by	Written by	Original release date
1	"This Boy, Seimei's Successor"; Transliteration: "Kono shōnen, Seimei no koukei ni tsuki" (Japanese: この少年、晴明の後継につき)	Hirokazu Yamada	Miya Asakawa	October 3, 2006
At a first glance, Abe no Masahiro does not seem to have any talent. He tries hard at everything, but never succeeds at anything. However, things are about to change when Masahiro meets up with a mysterious mononoke. The mononoke claims that he can help Masahiro achieve his dream: to become an Onmyouji. But is there any hope left for Masahiro?
2	"When the Imperial Palace Burned"; Transliteration: "Oumagadoki ni dairi moyu" (Japanese: 逢魔が時に内裏燃ゆ)	Kunitoshi Okajima	Touko Machida	October 10, 2006
Masahiro is now officially an onmyouji-in-training. In celebration, his father takes him to visit head of the important Fujiwara clan. While there visiting the Fujiwara clan's castle, he meets the princess, Akiko, who can oddly enough see spirits. However, the castle later on bursts into flames and Akiko is attacked by a spirit, forcing Masahiro to defend her.
3	"Listen To The Voice When Afraid Of The Dark"; Transliteration: "Yami ni obieru koe o kike" (Japanese: 闇に怯える声をきけ)	Masahiro Takada	Nobuaki Yamaguchi	October 17, 2006
While everyone is patching up things from the fire that took place at the Omou dorms, Masahiro and Guren/Mokkun try to unravel the mystery surrounding the occurrences of that day.
4	"Search For The Shadow Of The Foreign Country"; Transliteration: "Ihou no kage o sagashidase" (Japanese: 異邦の影を探しだせ)	Shinichirō Aoki	Kiyoko Yoshimura	October 24, 2006
Mokkun and Masahiro are still pondering about the ox demon that attacked them last night. After all, neither Masahiro nor Mokkun recognize that demon as one of the local troublemakers. However, they both know one important detail: the last demon has a 'master' of great strength. Who is that master?
5	"Forcing Back the Ferocious Monsters"; Transliteration: "Takeru youi o shirizokero" (Japanese: 猛る妖異を退けろ)	Shunji Yoshida	Miya Asakawa	October 31, 2006
Masahiro and Mokkun go in search of the 'master' of all the western demons that have been attacking them. However, the trail leads them to what appears to be an abandoned farm. There, they are attacked by a swarm of foreign demons who want to offer Masahiro to their master. But when the master finally comes to claim his prize, Masahiro might have gotten more than he had expected...
6	"Catching the Signs that Appear in the Dead of the Night"; Transliteration: "Yain ni ukabu kizashi o tsukame" (Japanese: 夜陰に浮かぶ兆しを掴め)	Shigeru Ueda	Miya Asakawa	November 7, 2006
The battle between Kyuuki, a powerful demon originated from the west, has ended. And things are back to normal; or at least, they would be if they actually defeated the beast. Masahiro and Guren are still searching for answers, with no luck– It seems that the demon's aura has completely vanished and cannot be traced.
7	"The Hatred of the Woman Controlled by the Enemy"; Transliteration: "Kanata ni taguru onna no omoi" (Japanese: 彼方に手繰る女の念い)	Yūji Hiraki	Miya Asakawa	November 14, 2006
One night, Akiko is called by a familiar voice. It turns out to be her cousin, Keiko. Keiko attempts to lure Akiko out of the palace and Seimei's demon-repelling barrier, but Akiko notices that there's something wrong with Keiko. The next day, she gets Masahiro to investigate what's wrong with her cousin, who is supposed to be in bed sick.
8	"Dispelling the Hatred that Reverberated at Kifune"; Transliteration: "Kifune ni hibiku ensa o tomero" (Japanese: 貴船に響く怨嗟を止めろ)	Masahiro Takada	Nobuaki Yamaguchi	November 21, 2006
Akiko has been kidnapped by her possessed distant relative, Keiko and taken to the Kifune shrine. And that's exactly where Masahiro and Mokkun are headed.
9	"Shattering the Binding of the Curse of Darkness"; Transliteration: "Yami no jubaku o uchikudake" (Japanese: 闇の呪縛を打ち砕け)	Kunitoshi Okajima	Kiyoko Yoshimura	November 28, 2006
In an attempt to rescue Akiko, Masahiro, Guren, and the other shikigami take on the hawk demons Gaku and Shun. Seiiryu still does not accept Masahiro as Seimei's heir and thus tries to keep him out of the battle, much to Masahiro's annoyance.
10	"A Voice in Response to a Faint Wish"; Transliteration: "Awaki negai ni irae no koe wo" (Japanese: 淡き願いに応えの声を)	Masayuki Iimura	Touko Machida	December 5, 2006
Masahiro is back in bed, resting. Mokkun, however, is still worried over the events back at Kifune Mountain. Suddenly, Masahiro awakens his body now a pure white color. It turns out dragon of Kifune has possessed Masahiro in order to both heal and warn Mokkun of an upcoming danger. What can it be?Meanwhile, Akiko is still getting bothered by haunting voices. She reports this to Seimei, who diagnoses it as a curse inflicted by the demons that the dragon god had killed last night. He decides to transfer it to himself in order to deter Akiko from the pain, but Masahiro has a surprising request for his grandfather.
11	"Hold the Symbol of the Vow Close to Heart"; Transliteration: "Chikai no shirushi o mune ni dake" (Japanese: 誓いの刻印を胸に抱け)	Tatsuya Igarashi	Kiyoko Yoshimura	December 12, 2006
12	"Penetrate the Mirror Cage"; Transliteration: "Kagami no ori o tsukiyabure" (Japanese: 鏡の檻をつき破れ)	Shunji Yoshida	Nobuaki Yamaguchi	December 19, 2006
With the help of Guren, Rikugou, and Seiryuu finally put an end to Kyuuki. But what about Akiko? Will Masahiro have to say farewell to the girl that he loves?
13	"The Catastrophic Song Brought by the Whirlwind"; Transliteration: "Tsujikaze ga hakobu magauta" (Japanese: 辻風が運ぶ禍歌)	Masahiro Takada	Miya Asakawa	December 26, 2006
Akiko moves in with Masahiro and Seimei together with her mother. Then later, an evil spirit is planning to get revenge on the man he hates so Masahiro and Mokkun will have to find out who's the man that the evil spirit's after.
14	"It is Like the Full Moon to Wane"; Transliteration: "Michita tsuki ga kakeru ga gotoku" (Japanese: 満ちた月が欠けるが如く)	Hirokazu Yamada	Satoru Nishizono	January 2, 2007
An evil spirit named Moronao is going after Fujiwara no Yukinari thinking that he's the one who exiled him and engulfs him in an evil aura. Masahiro and Mokkun goes to visit Yukinari after he finishes his work. Meanwhile, Akiko and her mom went shopping and be back soon while Rikugo follows them just to be sure that the girls are safe. Rikugo was impressed that Akiko managed to see him and noticed an unfamiliar face. Masahiro and Mokkun noticed the evil aura around Yukinari's house and goes to investigate. After Yukinari's awake, he gives Masahiro an advice about Toshitsugu and Masahiro agrees that he will be a better onmyouji. Then, Moronao appears again and Toshitsugu tries to exorcise the evil spirit but failed. The next day, a possessed Toshitsugu attacks Masahiro and Mokkun and vanished after he took the cursed jewel from the forbidden repository. Yukinari's condition got worse and Masahiro goes to help Yukinari and managed to lift the evil aura. Masahiro and Mokkun leaves the house and they have to figure out how to remove the curse on Yukinari and Mokkun decides to help him.
15	"Release the Catastrophic Chains"; Transliteration: "Magatsu kusari o tokihanate" (Japanese: 禍つ鎖を解き放て)	Hiroyuki Tsuchiya	Touko Machida	January 9, 2007
It is revealed that Moronao has mistaken Yukinari for his grandfather, Fujiwara no Koretada, and seeks to carry out revenge against Yukinari's grandfather (who's already dead) for tricking him and causing his exilement. Masahiro tricks Moronao into a barrier and was about to perform an exorcism when spirits are brought to life by the mysterious woman who had released Moronao from his grave. Who is this woman and will Masahiro, his grandfather, and the 12 Shinshou be able to stop the spirit rising and this woman, while taking care of Moronao before he finishes off Yukinari?
16	"The Old Shadow Wanders in the Night"; Transliteration: "Furuki kage wa yoru ni mayoi" (Japanese: 古き影は夜に迷い)	Hirofumi Ogura	Kiyoko Yoshimura	January 16, 2007
The mysterious woman is revealed to be Kazane. During the conversation with the Kifune Dragon God who possessed Masahiro, Akiko enters unexpectedly then the Dragon God leaves afterwards. When Masahiro and Mokkun were patrolling they notice a spirit border guard wandering around and they follow him. While tailing the guard, a massed demon is pursuing him but Toshitsugu managed to attract its attention. In order for Masahiro to avoid revealing his secret to Toshitsugu, he loans Rikugo's cloak to cover his face and Masahiro, Guren, and Rikugo managed to defeat it and retreats after a misunderstanding from Toshitsugu. Later that night, Rikugo tells Seimei and Mokkun that Kazane is working with an evil master named Ryuusai. Masahiro awakes from a dream and Akiko noticed the spirit border guard (whom he saves it from Toshitsugu's attack) that was inside him. While Kazane is fighting a demon, Masahiro defeats it and Kazane was shocked to see him alive (after she failed to drowned him in a pond 10 years ago) then attempts to kill him again but Mokkun (Touda) stops her and she flees and Toshitsugu almost reveals Masahiro's secret. At the Abe no house, Seimei is going to have a talk with Mokkun (Touda) revealing that he's the shikigami who's being hated the most.
17	"Sleep Embraced by the Snow"; Transliteration: "Rikka ni idakarete nemure" (Japanese: 六花に抱かれて眠れ)	Tatsuya Igarashi	Nobuaki Yamaguchi	January 23, 2007
18	"That Reason is Not Known by Anyone"; Transliteration: "Sono riyū wa dare shirazu" (Japanese: その理由は誰知らず)	Shunji Yoshida	Miya Asakawa	January 30, 2007
Masahiro was sent on an errand by Head Master Abe to check on Narichika the youngest calendar master while Seimei's familiars discuss this about him with Akiko. That night, an evil demon attacks Narichika's house and Masahiro goes to assist but Mokkun doesn't want to go there, and the demon flees afterwards. After a conversation with his brother, Masahiro noticed Mokkun acting strange. Narichika's daughter Kohime was targeted by demons and the reason why Mokkun refused to go there because the children (even Narichika's Kohime) feared him except Masahiro (as a child). Seimei tells Masahiro to exorcise the monkey demon but is unsure if he can do it without Mokkun so Rikugo and Kouchin assist him. Then, the monkey demon attacks again, and brought monkey reinforcements with him and managed to destroy the barrier and steals Kohime, but drops her and got defeated by Guren. After the battle, Mokkun got humiliated when Masahiro wants him to admit that he likes Kohime who doesn't fear him anymore and the other Shinsho joined him eating Narichika's rice balls.
19	"When the North Star is Clouded"; Transliteration: "Hokushin ni kageri sasu toki" (Japanese: 北辰に翳りさす時)	Masahiro Takada	Satoru Nishizono	February 6, 2007
After a preview of Kazane's past, Masahiro and Mokkun sets off. In the dorms, everyone including Toshitsugu feels ill and Toshitsugu tells Masahiro to be careful not to let his guard down. Later that night, Kazane infiltrates the temple and Ryuusai tells her to open the door to the underworld and Kazane's determined to get her revenge on Seimei. Meanwhile, Masahiro woke up from a nightmare and asks Mokkun why he takes the form of a mononoke, which Mokkun explains he likes it to be like a pet. Next day, Masahiro goes to work and then later, detects an evil spirit. Seimei sent his 3 Shinsho to investigate the evil source and Masahiro and Mokkun joins them. They encountered the demon including Kazane and Rikugo goes after her, but the demon flees and Ryuusai appears in front of the Shinsho. Then, the emperor got cursed and Akiko got affected and the mysterious man is trying to claim the throne as his.
20	"Chase the Wind That Invites the Underworld"; Transliteration: "Yomi ni izanau kaze o oe" (Japanese: 黄泉に誘う風を追え)	Hiroyuki Tsuchiya	Nobuaki Yamaguchi	February 13, 2007
Seimei woke up from a dream about Ryuusai & Wakana while Masahiro takes care of Akiko who tells him to check on Shoko and Masahiro goes to see her tomorrow. The next day, Mokkun becomes confused of the 2 sisters: Shoko and Akiko because they're look-a-likes and discuss this to Masahiro on the way while Yukinari tells his soldiers to go on guard. Meanwhile, Seimei investigates around the emperor's palace and feared that he's been watched, he meets Kazane and immediately snaps when Seimei called Ryuusai his friend. Suddenly, the miasma comes out from the underworld and Kazane took the emperor's princess Nagako with her but the miasma was stopped by Genbu. After Seimei tells his past story to Masahiro and also how Guren was struck by the Soul Binding Spell from Ryuusai, Masahiro goes to rescue Nagaku with help from the Shinsho. Kazane reveals to be Ryuusai's daughter and Guren the one being used to kill Ryuusai.
21	"Let the Bonds Hold in the Fires of Sin"; Transliteration: "Tsumi no honoo ni kizuna tae" (Japanese: 罪の焔に絆絶え)	Tatsuya Igarashi	Kiyoko Yoshimura	February 20, 2007
Masahiro, Guren, and the 3 Shinsho are trapped in the underworld. Due to a huge suffering in Nagako's heart, Masahiro tells Genbu to create a mirror to see her mother which she explains that she didn't want to leave her daughter and Nagako agrees to go home. Then, Masahiro and the 3 Shinsho struggle to deal with a demon due to regeneration from the miasma until defeated by Guren. All of a sudden, Guren attacks Masahiro because Kazane removed the seal on his head (earlier on) and also the one who put the Soul Binding Spell on him, so Rikugo battles Guren (Touda). Just when things are about to get worse for Rikugo and Kazane, Seimei appears just in time and battles Touda while his Shinsho tends to Masahiro's wounds and Tenistsu heals him by transferring his injuries to her. Then, the crow reveals to be Chishiki no Guji the one who kills Ryuusai and cursed the emperor then uses Touda to attack Seimei and his Shinsho.
22	"Everything for the Priestess"; Transliteration: "Subete wa miko no on tame ni" (Japanese: すべては巫女の御為に)	Shunji Yoshida	Touko Machida	February 27, 2007
The battle between Touda and Seimei continues as Seimei and his Shinsho struggled to fend off Touda's multi-attack. Meanwhile, Takao's minion felt Kazane's spiritual power then goes to the underworld revealing to be Chigaeshi no Miko's daughter. Seimei and his Shinsho got teleported back to the real world by Takaokami and she and her minion discuss the matter to Seimei about Guji's plot including the 2 worlds. After the discussion, Seimei agrees to help Takao and later at Abe no Seimei's place, The Shinsho decides to get Touda back or die trying.
23	"The Flame of Kagutsuchi Shines Majestically"; Transliteration: "Kagutsuchi no honō wa ogosoka ni" (Japanese: 軻遇突智の焔は厳かに)	Hirokazu Yamada	Satoru Nishizono	March 6, 2007
Despite not fully healed yet, Masahiro goes out at night to Kifune via Kuromanosuke to meet Dragon God Takaokami and she tells him that Touda's been used by Guji and Masahiro asked if there's a way to save him but there isn't. Takaokami explains that Shikigami are born from human desires so if Masahiro doesn't save Touda, he'll forget about him and turned into a different form. Kochin appears just as Masahiro passed out and she took Masahiro back to the house. The next day, Masahiro goes out to work and Toshitsugu tells him to rest and takes his place. Meanwhile at Yukinari's place, Masahiro's not sure if killing Touda can solve everything and leaves afterwards then asks Rikugo and Tai'in if Tennitsu is okay from her injuries but they said she'll be alright. Back at Kifune, Masahiro decides to lent Takaokami's power: "The Flame of Kagutsuchi" but needs Suzaku's soul to control its power. Later, Masahiro and Toshitsugu goes to Izumo and leaves Akiko's charm with her.
24	"Winds of Twilight, Eyes of Daybreak"; Transliteration: "Tasogare no kaze, Akatsuki no hitomi" (Japanese: 黄昏の風、暁の瞳)	Masahiro Takada	Kiyoko Yoshimura	March 13, 2007
Masahiro and the Shinsho arrived at Izumo and goes to find the cave to the dead world. Meanwhile, Kazane awakes and saw Kai alive and talking so the 2 of them go to where her mom was sealed by Guji. Then, Guji explains that he transfers his soul to Ryuusai who was killed by Touda and then uses Kazane's power to open the gate to the dead world. Kai managed to teleport Kazane somewhere at the cost of his life, as when she was about to get eaten by demons, Masahiro and the Shinsho saves her and Rikugo tells Kazane his real name is Saiki then she dies. Masahiro, Seimei, and the Shinsho goes to the entrance then prepare to battle Guji (in Ryuusai's body) and the demons.
25	"A Dance of Junipers in a Whirl of Misfortune"; Transliteration: "Magaki no uzu ni ibuki mau" (Japanese: 禍気の渦に伊吹舞う)	Hiroyuki Tsuchiya; Kunihiro Mori	Nobuaki Yamaguchi	March 20, 2007
Seimei and his Shinsho act as a distraction to allow Masahiro to go after Touda with Seryuu and Kochin assisting him. Meanwhile, Touda reaches the last Seal and attempts to remove it, while on the battlefield, Seimei tells his Shikigami to stop the demons while he battles Guji alone. Luckily, Rikugo arrives to help Seimei and teamed up with him to fight against Guji and managed to defeat him along with his demons allowing Ryuusai to R.I.P while Tai'in tells Seimei and the others that she found Miko (Kazane's mom) and Seimei frees her. Masahiro, Seryuu and Kochin arrived at the last seal with Masahiro holding Kagutsuchi while Touda is dealing with the last seal guardian.
26	"Sharpen the Sword of Flame"; Transliteration: "Honoo no yaiba o togi sumase" (Japanese: 焔の刃を研ぎ澄ませ)	Tatsuya Igarashi	Miya Asakawa	March 27, 2007
Masahiro used Kagutsuchi to block Touda's attacks then stabs him, reverting to Mokkun. Then, Masahiro revives Mokkun by sacrificing his life for him and he faints. Meanwhile, Akiko prays for Masahiro while Masahiro is in a dream attempting to cross the river and meets Wakana. When Masahiro was surprised to see Akiko's charm with him which he thought he left with her, Wakana explains that is the thing of someone who worries about someone they love then she leaves afterwards. In the real world, Masahiro and Mokkun woke up and everyone is relieved while Rikugo treasures Kazane's pendant. Later on, Touda is confused why he is in a mononoke form which Ko explains that it is Seimei's direct orders and it is a bittersweet ending since Masahiro says that it is painful to lose someone at a cost of one's life.

=== Stage plays ===
A musical adaptation titled Shōnen Onmyōji: Uta Emaki ―Kono Shōnen, Seimei no Kōkei ni Tsuki― (少年陰陽師 ＜歌絵巻＞ ―この少年、晴明の後継につき―; Shōnen Onmyōji: Scroll Song --This Boy is the Successor of Seimei--) ran in the Sunshine Theater in Ikebukuro from October 4 to October 8, 2007. It featured an original story with ten characters unique to the musical version.

A second stage adaptation titled Shōnen Onmyōji Gendai-hen Tō no Nemuri Nomina Mezame (少年陰陽師 現代編・遠の眠りのみな目覚め; Shōnen Onmyōji: Modern Edition – Awakening from a Distant Sleep) ran in the Tsukiji Hongan-ji Buddhist Hall in Tokyo from February 22 to March 1, 2020.

== See also ==
- Abe no Seimei
- Onmyōji
- Shikigami
