= Genki Okawa =

Japanese actor

- 大河 元気
- Born: Genki Oshikawa; 26 August 1987 (age 39); Gamagōri, Aichi Prefecture, Japan
- Occupations: Actor; voice actor
- Years active: 2005–present
- Agent: Amuleto
- Notable work: Tenimyu
- Style: Stage; film; anime television
- Height: 1.7 m (5 ft 7 in)

Genki Oshikawa (押川 元気, Oshikawa Genki; born 26 August 1987), known professionally as Genki Okawa (大河 元気, Ōkawa Genki), is a Japanese actor and voice actor who has appeared in a number of feature films, stage productions and television series. He is represented with Amuleto.

== Filmography ==
=== Stage ===
Year	Title	Role	Notes
2006	Tenimyu	Akaya Kirihara	
2007	Blue Shuttle Produce: Peacemaker Kurogane		Osaka performance guest
2008	Axle: Wild Adapter		
2009	Butai: K		
2010	Kokansetsu!	Tsuyoshi Nakanishi	
2011	abc Akasaka Boys Cabaret Spin Off: GenePro! Jibun ni Katsu o Irete Katsu!	Shinichiro Kyoto	
2011	Super Musical: Saint Seiya	Dagon of Yaoga Sagitta	
2011	Niconico Musical Dai 7-dan Genji Monogatari	Kōkiden Nyōgo / Yui Otsu	
2011	Butai: The Betrayal Knows My Name	Yuzuki Gio	
2014	Persona 3 the Weird Masquerade: Ao no Kakusei	Junpei Iori	
2014	Gaku Ran Kageki: Teiichi no Kuni	Okuri Morizono	
2014	Bakafuki!	Asura	Created and directed; lead role
2015	Rōdoku Geki: Madō-shi wa Heibon o Nozomu		
2016	Retsu! Bakafuki!	Asura	Created and directed; lead role

=== Films ===
Year	Title	Role	Notes
2008	Cafe Daikanyama: Sweet Boys	Suzutaro "Sardine" Ichijo	
2008	Cafe Daikanyama II: Yume no Tsuzuki	Suzutaro "Sardine" Ichijo	
2009	Cafe Daikanyama III: Sorezore no Ashita	Suzutaro "Sardine Ichijo	
2009	Hanamuko wa 18-sai	Masaya Akagi	Lead role
2009	Dai 2 Shashin-bu	Yuji Takada	
2009	Beat Rock Club	Torataro Kimura	
2009	Panic 4 Rooms	Nice	
2009	Game Action	Mars	
2009	Game Action: Side Story 1	Mars	
2010	Kenka Banchō Gekijō-ban: Zenkoku Seiha	Yohei Sawakita	

=== TV series ===
Year	Title	Role	Network
2008	Copernicus no tamago Neo		Sun TV
2010	Style Collection Vol. 3: Ryokō Date		SATV
2011	H.I.S. presents Terry Ito no Sekai no Tabisetsu		Tokyo MX
2012	Shinwa Senshi Gigazeus	Kazuya	KTV
2013	Bitworld	Bata Diabloma (Lady Margarine)	NHK-E

=== Narration ===
Year	Title	Network	Ref.
2015	Kōsen Robocon 2015 Zenkoku Taikai: Wanage Taiketsu Mezameyo! Hōsu no Chikara	NHK-G	

=== Anime television ===
Title	Role	Network	Ref.
Yu-Gi-Oh! Zexal II	Mizael	TV Tokyo	
Kuromukuro	Himi	AT-X, Tokyo MX, Sun, KBS, BS11, Tulip-TV	
B-Project	Tatsuhiro Nome	Tokyo MX, ABC, CBC, GTV, Tochi TV, BS11	
Servamp	Ryusei	AT-X, Tokyo MX, Sun, NBN, BS NTV	
Nanbaka	Qi	MBS, Tokyo MX, BS11	
Sabapara	Maru		
Scared Rider Xechs	Makoto Omi	AT-X, Tokyo MX, Sun, NBN, BS NTV	
Altair: A Record of Battles	Elmer Schmidt	MBS, TBS, BS-TBS (Animeism B2), BSN	
Beyblade Burst God	Kurtz Baratier	TXN (TV Tokyo, TV Osaka)	
Black Clover	Alecdora Sandler	TV Tokyo	
Marginal#4: Kiss kara Tsukuru Big Bang	Kira Himuro	Tokyo MX, KBS, Sun, BS11	
Welcome to Demon School! Iruma-kun	Gaap Goemon	NHK Educational TV	
Toilet-Bound Hanako-kun	Lemon Yamabuki	TBS, SUN, CBC, BS-TBS	
Bungou to Alchemist	Cat/Acting Director		
2.43: Seiin High School Boys Volleyball Team	Kohei Tokura	Fuji TV (NoitaminA)	
The Prince of Tennis II: U-17 World Cup	Mac McGregor	TV Tokyo, TV Osaka, TV Aichi	
Fluffy Paradise	Wilhelt	Tokyo MX, BS11, ytv	
Bucchigiri?!	Arajin Tomoshibi	TV Tokyo	
Dekin no Mogura	Kuriaki Magi	TBA	

=== Advertisements ===
Year	Title	Ref.
2009	Nintendo DS Suparobo Gakuen	
2013	Gekkan Hobby Japan	

=== Radio ===
Year	Title	Network
2007	Taihen osore Irimasuga, Genki Okawa no Radio desu	Juscli
	Radio Kusari kake Dai 52-kai	
	Sugao no Shōnen	Internet radio; Episode 2
2008	Ota Mama Club	
2016	Pythagoras Channel	Niconico Live

=== Video games ===
Title	Role	Ref.
A lot of Stories	Ares	
Quiz RPG: Mahōtsukai to Kuro Neko no Witch	Jimmy	
Thousand Memories	Rouffa of the Rocket / Zelsoz of the Dragon Dragon / The Pastor of the Shouten / Bakin of the Black Purple Kahyat	
Sutapyi: Anata wa motto Kagayakeru	Kyosuke Nishi	
Atelier Sophie: The Alchemist of the Mysterious Book	Giulio Sebart Raudenshaft	
Dekaron	Black Wizard	
Marginal#4 Idol Of Supernova	Kira Himuro	
Yu-Gi-Oh! Zexal Gekitotsu! Duel Carnival!	Mizaeru	
100 Sleeping Princes and the Kingdom of Dreams	Castor/Pollux	
Little Anchor	Lucio Soares	
The King of Fighters for Girls	Benimaru Nikaido	
Assault Spy	Asaru Vito	
Ikemen Live: Koi no Uta o Kimi ni	Henri Amamiya	

=== CD ===
==== As himself ====
Year	Title	Standard part no.
2009	Rise	PCCA-2949

==== As a character ====
Year	Album	Role	Song	Tie-up
2009	Little Anchor Original Soundtrack	Lucio Soares	"miracle"	
2014	Catastrophe	Kira Himuro	"Catastrophe"; "1/f no Yuragi"; "Message Bottle"; "Dear Princess"	Lagrange Point character song
2014	Black Swan	Kira Himuro	"Black Swan"; "Never Sorrow"; "Ichikabachika"; "Goodbye Echoes!!!!"	Lagrange Point character song
2015	Ai, Dokusai: Samurai	Kira Himuro	"Ai, Dokusai: Samurai"; "Shoot off"; "Wansentensu ja, Hairi kiranai yo"; "Akatsukigata ni, Shō yu"	Lagrange Point character song
2015	Lagrange Point The Best: Lagjuliet	Kira Himuro	"Luv Exodus"; "Nan-Boo-No-Mon-Ja-E"	Lagrange Point character song
2015	Star Grand Prix!	Kyosuke Nishi	"Star Grand Prix!"	Sutapyi: Anata wa motto Kagayakeru character song
2015	Beautiful Phantom	Kira Himuro	"Beautiful Phantom"; "Red Buzzer Beat"; "Ai no Fatah Mole Ghana"; "Ima wa GoodNight"	Lagrange Point character song
2015	Ai to iu Kotoba o Nikumu Hibi ga Towa ni Tsuzuite mo Ore o Yurushite kure	Kira Himuro	"Ai to iu Kotoba o Nikumu Hibi ga Towa ni Tsuzuite mo Ore o Yurushite kure"; "Aku no Hana"; "Rokujūkyū Yoru"; "Blackout/Whiteout"	Lagrange Point character song
2015	Eikyuu Paradise (永久パラダイス)	Tatsuhiro Nome	"Eikyuu Paradise	B-Project character song
2015	Glory Upper	Tatsuhiro Nome	"Glory Upper"; "Over The Rainbow"; "Eikyuu Paradise (MooNs Ver.)"	B-Project: MooNs character song
2016	Kiseki no Sign Short ver: Single	Kira Himuro	"Kiseki no Sign Short ver"	Pythagoras All-Star character song
2016	Prisoner	Kira Himuro	"Prisoner"; "Last Chance!!!"; "Crystal Switch"; "Mōsō Violinist"	Lagrange Point character song
2016	Brand New Star	Tatsuhiro Nome	"Brand New Star"; "Love☆Reboryu (ラブ☆レボリュ, Rabu☆Reboryu)"	B-Project: MooNs character song
2016	Viva la Chu	Kira Himuro	"Viva la Chu"; "Hadashi no Destiny"	Wonder Corona character song
2016	The Best: Lagjuliet II	Kira Himuro	"Hachiku no Ai"; "Guideline"	Lagrange Point character song
2016	Kodō＊Ambitious (鼓動＊アンビシャス, Kodō＊Anbishasu)	Tatsuhiro Nome	"Kodō＊Ambitious"	B-Project: Kodō＊Ambitious theme song
2016	Samajera	Kira Himuro	"Samajera"; "Hanabi"	Wonder Corona character song
2016	Hoshi to Tsuki no Sentence (星と月のセンテンス)	Tatsuhiro Nome	"Yume Miru Power (夢見るPOWER)"	B-Project: MooNs character song
2016	Muteki＊Dangerous (無敵＊デンジャラス, Muteki＊Denjyarasu)	Tatsuhiro Nome	"Muteki＊Dangerous"; "Eikyuu Paradise (14 Vocal Ver.)"	B-Project character song
2017	SUMMER MERMAID	Tatsuhiro Nome	"SUMMER MERMAID"; "Panorama (パノラマ)"	B-Project: MooNs character song
2017	B-Project: Kodō＊Ambitious Volume 6	Tatsuhiro Nome	"LONELY HEROES"	B-Project character song
2017	S-Kyuu Paradise BLACK (S級パラダイス BLACK)	Tatsuhiro Nome	"S-Kyuu Paradise"; "Muteki＊Dangerous"; "Glory Upper"; "Love☆Reboryu"; "SUMMER MERMAID"	B-Project character song
2017	S-Kyuu Paradise WHITE (S級パラダイス WHITE)	Tatsuhiro Nome	"S-Kyuu Paradise"; "PRAY FOR..."; "Eikyuu Paradise"; "Brand New Star"; "Panorama"; "Over the Rainbow"	B-Project character song

==== Reading CD ====
Title	Role
Kijo no Ruisen Hogushi-tai!!! Sadistic Therapist Mikio no Shinsatsu	Ryunosuke
Honeybee Hitsuji de oyasumi Series Kakumei-hen: Kuchizuke wa Asa made o azuke	

=== Drama CD ===
Title	Role
Tap Trap Love Vol. 2: Clown	Anger
Marginal #4: Hoshifuruyoru no, Sweet Valentine	Kira Himuro
Marginal #4: Hoshifuruyoru no, Halloween Party	Kira Himuro
Marginal #4: Hoshifuruyoru ga, Okoshita 4tsu no Kiseki	Kira Himuro
Marginal #4: Hoshifuruyoru no, Christmas	Kira Himuro

=== DVD ===
Title
Talk DVD: Talking Face Vol. 5 Genki Okawa × Herbie Yamaguchi
Natural Face vol. 3: Chōkin
Natural Face vol. 7: Tōgei/Kyo Shippō
Natural Face vol. 10: Genki World Sadō
Men's DVD: High-Spirit
Rejet Fes.2014 Discovery DVD
Rejet Fes.2014 -Only One- DVD
Little Anchor Dead Or Live Event DVD

=== Internet ===
Year	Title	Network
2013	Genki Okawa no link staGe	Niconico Channel

=== Mobile ===
Title
Visual Boy
Smart Boys: Real faces Genki Okawa
Smart Boys: Gakuen no Clover

=== Music videos ===
Year	Title
2008	12012 "Aitaikara...."

=== Photo albums ===
Title
Tombow Gakusei-fuku

=== Books ===
Year	Title
2007	Shashin-shū: other cut of 168
2008	Men's Shashin-shū: Wing
2008	Hataraku Men's Shashin-shū: Work-ish
2010	Shashin-shū: Stigmata
2010	Shashin-shū: Other Side

=== Dubbing ===
- Belgravia, Charles Pope (Jack Bardoe)
