= List of Saiyuki episodes =

Saiyuki [Blu-ray] cover of the first series.

Saiyuki is a Japanese manga series by Kazuya Minekura which has multiple anime adaptations. The first adaptation of Saiyuki was a two episode OVA by Tokyo Kids. The first episode was released on April 23, 1999, while the second episode was released on August 27, 1999. A television series was created by Studio Pierrot and Dentsu titled Gensomaden Saiyuki. The series aired on TV Tokyo from April 4, 2000, to March 27, 2001, spanning 50 episodes.

Another series titled Saiyuki Reload was created by the same companies and it adapts from the manga of the same name. It aired on the same network from October 2, 2003, to March 25, 2004.

A sequel titled Saiyuki Reload Gunlock was also created by the companies and aired on the same network from April 1, 2004, to September 23, 2004. ADV Films licensed Gensomaden Saiyuki and the film. The sequels Saiyuki Reload and Saiyuki Reload Gunlock are licensed by Geneon in North America, and consist of 25 and 26 episodes respectively. Saiyuki Reload is faithful to the manga from the fourteenth episode and onward, having deviated from it for the first 13 episodes. Saiyuki Reload Gunlock also starts off deviated from the manga, until midway into the series, but strays from it during its finale.

An anime television series adaptation of the Saiyuki Reload Blast manga series aired from July 5 to September 20, 2017, on Tokyo MX, TV Aichi, BS11, Sun TV. It ran for 12 episodes. Crunchyroll has licensed the series, and Funimation released it on home video as part of the two companies' partnership.

Enoki Films holds the U.S. license to Gensomaden Saiyuki under the title Saiyuki: Paradise Raiders. There has also been an anime film titled Saiyuki: Requiem that is also licensed by ADV.

A new OVA has been released by Studio Pierrot, which covers the "Burial" arc of the Saiyuki Reload manga; it is called Saiyuki Reload: Burial. In 2011, a new original video animation (OVA) series, Saiyuki Gaiden was created based on the same name manga series written and illustrated by Kazuya Minekura, and it is a prequel to the manga series saiyuki which ended in Ichijinsha's Monthly Comic Zero-Sum magazine in 2009.

In January 2021, A new anime series produced by Liden Films titled Saiyuki Reload: Zeroin has been announced. The main cast members reprised their roles. It aired from January 6 to March 31, 2022.

== Series overview ==
Season	Episodes	Originally released	
Season	Episodes	First released	Last released
1	50	April 4, 2000	March 27, 2001
2	25	October 2, 2003	March 2, 2004
3	26	April 1, 2004	September 23, 2004
4	12	July 5, 2017	September 20, 2017
5	13	January 6, 2022	March 31, 2022

== Episode list ==
=== Gensomaden Saiyuki (2000–01) ===
No.	Title	Original release date
1	"Go to the West"; Transliteration: "Harukanaru Nishi e" (Japanese: はるかなるの西へ)	April 4, 2000
Shangri-La (Togenkyo) was a peaceful land where humans and demons lived together in harmony. Now, someone is trying to bring back the demon god Gyumao and as a result, evil energy starts to spread throughout the land, making all demons become uncontrollably aggressive. Ordered by the Celestial Court, a priest named Sanzo recruits his old comrades (demons who haven't been affected by the dark energy) and sets out on a journey to Indara in the Far West to find the culprit of this disaster.
2	"First Game – A Guide to the Land of the Dead"; Transliteration: "Yomi e no Annainin" (Japanese: 黄泉への案内人)	April 11, 2000
In a small town, the heroes meet a wounded girl called Ho-May, whose friend has been killed by a demon - so they decide to hide their true identities from her. A spider-woman disguised as a traveling entertainer ambushes the heroes, who have to reveal their identities to fight back. At first frightened, Ho-May ends up being thankful for the heroes despite their nature.
3	"His God, My God – The Divine Platform"; Transliteration: "Kami no iru Basho" (Japanese: 神のいる場所)	April 18, 2000
The heroes visit a huge temple on a rocky mountain, where the priests and apprentices live a strict life of studying sacred scrolls and purifying their souls under the principles of "no drinking, no smoking, and all tangible things are vain". They are surprised to see Sanzo partaking in these forbidden activities. Assassins sent by the evil monster Kogaiji attack the temple, and the heroes' defense is impeded by the priests refusing to kill any living being.
4	"Crimson Tears"; Transliteration: "Akaneiro no Namida" (Japanese: 茜色の涙)	April 25, 2000
The heroes visit the house of a young girl named Shun-Rey (Shunrei), who is waiting for the return of her boyfriend – a demon who recently turned violent before leaving. Gojyo is surprised when he hears the name of this demon, Gee-Yen (Jien), which is the same as his missing half brother. The townsfolk mention a recent monster attack which involved someone looking like Gee-Yen, so Shun-Rey runs to the forest, but turns out her boyfriend was not involved, and Gojyo realizes that he's not the same person as his half brother. In the meantime, we learn that Kogaiji's mother is being held hostage, forcing him to work for Gyumaoh's side.
5	"Beautiful Assassin"; Transliteration: "Utsukushiki Ansatsusha" (Japanese: 美しき暗殺者)	May 2, 2000
Cheer-Rat (Yaone), Kogaiji's loyal follower since he saved her from the Demon with One Hundred Eyes (Hyakugan Maoh), asks to be sent to kill the heroes. She plans to poison them, but hesitates after they save her from some drunken thugs. Remembering her loyalty to her master, she attacks them again, but is soon defeated and tries to take her own life in shame. Kogaiji saves her from herself, leading to his first meeting with the heroes, but he flees quickly after a show of strength.
6	"Unnatural Talismanic Monk"; Transliteration: "Jufu no Kaisou" (Japanese: 呪符の怪僧)	May 9, 2000
Stopping at an inn, the heroes hear about Rick-Do (Rikudo), a monk who destroys demons with powerful talismans. In a flashback about Sanzo's life 10 years ago, we learn that Rick-Do is actually his senior disciple, Shuei, who used a powerful talisman to save the temple after their master died and Sanzo left the temple. The talisman has now completely taken over Rick-Do, and compels him to kill all demons - which is why he starts attacking Goku, Gojyo, and Hakkai, but ends up hurting Sanzo in the process.
7	"Farewell at Dusk"; Transliteration: "Tosogare no Wakare" (Japanese: 黄昏の別れ)	May 16, 2000
When Sanzo is severely injured, Goku's head ring, which limits his powers, falls off. Goku becomes extremely powerful, but also loses his mind, attacking both Rick-Do (who runs away) and his own companions Gojyo and Hakkai. The Merciful Goddess (Kanzeon Bosatsu) intervenes, restores Goku's head ring and heals Sanzo. Barely recovered, Sanzo sneaks out to go confront Rick-Do and kills him.
8	"The Man Who Foretells Death"; Transliteration: "Shi o Uranau Otoko" (Japanese: 師を占う男)	May 23, 2000
It is revealed that Princess Gyokumen wants the Maten Scripture that Sanzo has, because she already has the Seiten Scripture (which she stole from Sanzo's master 10 years ago), and needs both to revive Gyumaoh. The heroes reach a new town, where a fortune teller named Chin-Ih-So (Chin Yisou) uses special mahjong tiles to guess things about them. A giant crab monster attacks the group but Lilin, Kogaiji's younger sister, defeats it. Kogaiji arrives with reinforcements - among whom Gyojo's brother - and both groups start to fight.
9	"Lethal Trap – Fight Party"; Transliteration: "Tatakai no Utage" (Japanese: 戦いの宴)	May 30, 2000
The heroes and Kogaiji's band engage in a fierce battle. Kogaiji realizes that Goku's immense power is because he's fighting for himself, and he starts doing that too. The previous monster crab is revealed to have been sent by Chin-Ih-So the fortune teller, who now sends an even bigger one, which both teams fight against together.
10	"A False Savior"; Transliteration: "Itsuwari no Kyuuseishu" (Japanese: 偽りの救世主)	June 6, 2000
Sanzo and his comrades arrive in a village where the residents believe their village was saved by the priest Sanzo. Thanks to this story, the heroes enjoy an enthusiastic welcome. However, a false party of Sanzo appears and the heroes are mistaken for imposters. The villagers jail the heroes, believing the bogus priest is the real Sanzo. That night, a monster assassin appears and the village is in a panic.
11	"Tragic Revenge. – The Death Laughs."; Transliteration: "Warau Shinigami" (Japanese: 笑う死神)	June 13, 2000
Awakened from a nightmare, Hakkai thinks about the girl he loved. When Sha Gojyo talks to Hakkai, a puppet controlled by the fortune-teller Chin-Ih-So attacks him and injects Sha Gojyo with the seed of a blood-sucking plant. The seed cannot be removed because it is too close to his heart. Sanzo tries to save Sha Gojyo by shooting the seed out of Sha Gojyo's body with a spirit-blasting gun. Sha Gojyo survives. Goku and White Dragon go out to fetch water and disappear.
12	"Wandering Destiny – Struggle in the Darkness."; Transliteration: "Yami to no Koubou" (Japanese: 闇との攻防)	June 20, 2000
The fortune-teller Chin-Ih-So approaches the heroes. Hakkai destroyed his family. Chin-Ih-So plots to cause Hakkai to go insane. Sha Gojyo and Goku are injured. Sanzo supports Hakkai in a silent battle with a dark, psychic world. Hakkai tries shake off a twisted illusion but, he is trapped by Chin-Ih-So's trick and suddenly attacks and wounds Sanzo. If Hakkai reverts back to himself, the heroes will quickly die.
13	"Crude Counterfeit – A Fruit of Death"; Transliteration: "Shi o Yobu Kajitsu" (Japanese: 死を呼ぶ果実)	June 27, 2000
Our heroes visit a temple where they grow a strangely shaped fruit. Two young disciples say they are taking care of the temple because the chief priest and all other monks left a month ago. Goku is hungry and reaches for the strange fruit. Sanzo senses something evil in the temple and the heroes decide to leave. Goku returns to prove nothing is wrong with the fruit of the temple but slips into a nightmare.
14	"A Sweet Client – I keep My Promise."; Transliteration: "Futari no Yakusoku" (Japanese: ふたりの約束)	July 4, 2000
Sanzo and three boys arrive in a small, remote village. When Sha Gojyo leaves to find pretty women, he meets a young woman who tags along with him. The woman tries to persuade Sha Gojyo to destroy a monster that killed her parents. Sha Gojyo is led to the monster's hideout and senses something weird is going on inside but does not realize it is a trap.
15	"The Ill-fated Guy – Spell of Red"; Transliteration: "Aka no Jubaku" (Japanese: 紅の呪縛)	July 11, 2000
The heroes have to sleep outside in the rain. Looking up in the rain, Sha Gojyo remembers three three years ago, he helped a young man named Chogo-Noh, who was lying on the roadside. Meanwhile, the Trinity Gods order Sanzo to arrest the man who massacred many monsters, who is Chogo-Noh.
16	"Be There! – A Praise for Staying Alive"; Transliteration: "Seija e no Sanka" (Japanese: 生者への讃歌)	July 18, 2000
Chogo-Noh flees into the woods to carry out his self-imposed mission. Suddenly, he is attacked by Crow-Man whose family Chogo-Noh killed. They fight and Crow-Man is shocked by Chogo-Noh's fighting spirit. Sanzo and Goku, who were tailing him, arrive and are followed by Sha Gojyo.
17	"Garden of Eden – A Eternal Paradise"; Transliteration: "Owari naki Rakuen" (Japanese: 終りなき楽園)	July 25, 2000
Sanzo and his comrades find numerous stoned monsters in a monsters' town called "Tofu-Gai" at the bottom of steep ravines. Goku, Sha-Gojyo and Cho Hakkai turn into stone statues because they are monsters too. Left alone, Sanzo asks a monster woman named Koran how he can save his friends. Koran introduces Sanzo to an old man called Muhan, who governs the town. Sanzo has to find a way to save his friends.
18	"Vice or Justice – The Truth of Justice"; Transliteration: "Seigi no Shinjitsu" (Japanese: 正義の真実)	August 1, 2000
Several monsters are missing. Yaone, a female warrior of Kogaiji, begins to investigate what is happening. Meanwhile, Sanzo and his three comrades find Tonpoo, an old friend of Sha Gojyo and Hakkai. Tonpoo tells the heroes he volunteered a militia called Fanron Troop, which consisted of humans tasked with hunting evil monsters. The same night, Yaone is captured by the captain of Fanron Troop when she sneaks into the camp.
19	"Don't go Alone – Desperate Girls"; Transliteration: "Nageki no Otometachi" (Japanese: 嘆きの乙女たち)	August 8, 2000
The heroes meet four beautiful sisters. Sanzo is reluctant to befriend them. Soon after they leave the sisters, the heroes discover the sisters want to kill them for saving the life of the eldest sister, who was possessed by a parasitic monster.
20	"Sandstorm – Trap of Quicksand"; Transliteration: "Ryuusa no Wana" (Japanese: 流砂の罠)	August 15, 2000
A monster that ate the priest Sanzo Senior hides in the desert. The heroes go into the desert and fall into quicksand. The desert monster has set a trap because he believes he will get eternal life if he eats a priest of great virtue. The monster becomes enraged by Sanzo's arrogant and disgraceful manner. In an underground jail, Goku, Sha Gojyo and Hakkai are engaged in a desperate battle with incessant scorpions.
21	"Selfish Dream – Reckless Run to Ruin"; Transliteration: "Hametsu e no Bousou" (Japanese: 破滅への暴走)	August 22, 2000
Five Sutras who are possessed by Sanzo and his comrades are needed for reviving Gyumao the Bull Satan. Trailing the Sutras, Kogaiji, Son of Bull Satan, crosses the desert and meets the heroes. Goku wants to help Sanzo, who is greatly weakened by scorpion poison but Kogaiji challenges him to a duel and proves to be an extraordinary warrior. Goku fears he cannot defeat Kogaiji with his normal power.
22	"Devastation – The Outcome of a Deadly Duel"; Transliteration: "Tatakai no Hate" (Japanese: 闘いの果て)	August 29, 2000
Goku takes out his head ring, which controls his infinite power; his sense of judgment vanishes, and he cannot recognize his friends and his enemies. With cruelty and violence, Goku begins to attack whoever he sees. No-one can stop Goku's devastating power but Sanzo manages to get up in front of Goku.
23	"Scapegoat – Reward of Subordination"; Transliteration: "Fukujuu no Daika" (Japanese: 服従の代価)	September 5, 2000
The heroes arrive at a Village with big canons sticking into the sky. They are surprised by a ceremony that offers a sacrifice to an evil monster that rules the residents. Hakkai is stunned by the young woman who is chosen as a sacrifice because she looks exactly like his dead girlfriend Kanan. The monster must be destroyed before the woman is sacrificed.
24	"Mother – Crimson Bond"; Transliteration: "Aka no Kizuna" (Japanese: 紅の絆)	September 12, 2000
Goku and Sha Gojyo enter a village in search of food, and meet a young mother named Yan-Min, who is hugging a new-born baby. The baby's eyes and hair are red like Goku's. Yan-Min's husband is a human-looking monster; the villagers despise her for having a monster's baby. A man called Nijenye is interested in the sadness and hatred spawned in her heart, and plans to use her secret feeling for his own purpose.
25	"Tomboy – Frightening Assassins!"; Transliteration: "Senritsu no Shikaku!" (Japanese: 戦慄の刺客)	September 26, 2000
Lilin, the young sister of Kogaiji, appears to challenge the heroes. Her trick is "Operation – Meat Bums on the Road", which fails to induce the heroes but surprisingly it works on three stupid monsters, who are defeated by Lilin and become her followers. Ordered by their new boss, they keep meddling in the heroes ways.
26	"Calling – No One Hears Your Cry."; Transliteration: "Todokazaru Sakebi" (Japanese: 届かざる叫び)	October 3, 2000
One of Kogaiji's troops, "Iron Demon Troop", assaults Sanzo and his comrades. The troop is destroyed by our heroes' overwhelming power. The troop's leader Rashu and a few soldiers survive. Rashu sets a trap to capture Sanzo and Goku in their armor. Goku and Sanzo cry inside their armor.
27	"Advent – The Evil God of War"; Transliteration: "Kourin・Toushintashi" (Japanese: 降臨・闘神太子)	October 10, 2000
Our heroes encounter new enemies from the heavens: Prince Homura, Zenon and Shien, who re neither human nor monsters but call themselves gods. Prince Homura is seeking Sanzo's Sutra of Dark Power. The gods say they know the heroes' previous existence.
28	"Lonely – The Signal of Rebellion"; Transliteration: "Honjyaku no noroshi" (Japanese: 反逆の狼煙)	October 17, 2000
Abandoning the Celestial Heavens, Prince Homura, Zenon and Shien decide to build a new world. They choose the tower and castle made by monster King Gailu and his warriors as their headquarters. The army of the Celestial Heavens, which is led by the self-professed gods, begins to attack and seize the tower. Leaving the battlefield, Prince Homura goes to see King Gairu with an offer.
29	"Unexpected Defeat – Fall of Castle Houto"; Transliteration: "Houtojou・Kanraku" (Japanese: 吠登城・陥落)	October 24, 2000
The Celestial army destroys the monster-warriors and soldiers in Castle Houto. Kogaiji and his followers are surprised by this defeat but Kogaiji realizes the three self-professed gods are his father Gyumao-Bull Satan. Kogaiji goes to the underground laboratory where an experiment with resurrection is underway. With Dokkakuji's help, Kogaiji fights against the Celestial army.
30	"Undertaker – An Invitation to Hell"; Transliteration: "Jigoku e no shoutaijou" (Japanese: 地獄への招待状)	October 31, 2000
The heroes walk into a desolate village and wonder what has happened there. Suddenly, four coffins of sizes equal to those of the heroes are pushed out and an illusion of a creature called The Undertaker appears. The Undertaker shows excessive courtesy to Sanzo and his comrades. Sha Gojyo is upset and Goku is angry. The Undertaker keeps telling disgusting stories, upsetting the heroes.
31	"Ambition – Arrogance of the 'Gods"; Transliteration: "Kamigami no ogori" (Japanese: 神々の驕り)	October 3, 2000
A platoon of five skilled warriors who scored many points at a military drill visit Prince Homura. They want to join the army of the Celestial Heavens. Prince Homura orders the warriors to destroy Sanzo's party and get the magic sutra. The platoon triumphantly marches out. Sanzo's party fight the platoon.
32	"Fake Star Strikes Back – Pride of the Impostors"; Transliteration: "Doukeshi no hokori" (Japanese: 道化師の誇り)	November 7, 2000
The heroes again meet the party of the bogus Sanzo. After the earlier incident, the bogus Sanzo never introduces himself as the priest Sanzo. The Bogus Sanzo and the impostors are fearful. The party of bogus heroes remember their pride as the best impostors in the world; they are sly and mean. They devise a plot to revenge the true heroes.
33	"Faraway Dream – Tears Dry Soon"; Transliteration: "Kareta namida" (Japanese: 枯れた泪)	November 14, 2000
While the heroes are struggling in a snowstorm, they meet Shoryu, a young monster who skillfully manipulates snow, ice, and water. Shoryu waits for the heroes to get Sanzo's sutra by the order of Prince Homura. Sanzo and three warriors are fooled by Shoryu's attack, which is empowered by an evil, forbidden spell. Shoryu's older sister Shoen is heading to Prince Homura's castle; she is ordered to get the Hallowed Sutra from Prince Homura by Koshu, the Lady Darkness who wants to revive Gyumao-Bull Satan.
34	"Second Contact – Warriors come back." Transliteration: "Toukami futatabi" (Japanese: 闘神再び)	November 21, 2000
Five skilled warriors of the Celestial Heavens appear in front of the heroes. They want to take the Sutra of Dark Power from Sanzo and force Son Goku side with them. The warrior attacks Goku and puts him in constant struggle. Goku can dodge, leap, and run out of deadly assaults.
35	"Solitude – The lonely heart" Transliteration: "Kodoku no tamashii" (Japanese: 孤独の魂)	November 28, 2000
Kogaiji visits the tomb of the girl he loved, who was reincarnated as a human. Kogaiji swears revenge on Son Goku and his comrades who defeated him in the Battle of Hoto Castle. Kogaiji summons and awakens the Demon of Recollection, and engages in a war of nerves.
36	"Brotherhood – A Crimson Flower"; Transliteration: "Akai hana" (Japanese: 紅い花)	December 12, 2000
Sanzo and his comrades are lost in deep woods in fog and rain, and have to sleep in the open. Sha-Gojyo hates this idea and tries to find a way out of the woods. He finds a cave and goes in to explore but soon realizes he is completely lost. Dokkakuji, Kogaiji's assistant who is also lost in the cave appears.
37	"Taciturnity – A Smile of Reticence"; Transliteration: "Tozasareta bishou" (Japanese: 閉ざされた微笑)	December 19, 2000
Sanzo and his party walk into a village in which Cho-Hakkai grew up in an orphanage. Hakkai has feelings of nostalgia and bitterness; he was a desperate child who never smiled. He meets Sister Shaohei, who spent her childhood in the same orphanage. She tells Hakkai there is a boy who never smiles, just like little Hakkai. Hakkai wants to see the boy.
38	"Fleeting Vision – An Unfilled Promise."; Transliteration: "Hatasenu yakusoku" (Japanese: はたせぬ約束)	December 26, 2000
The heroes defeat the monsters in the woods and get a good drink. While drinking, Sanzo recalls the incident involving his master Kohmyo-Sanzo a long time ago. Soon after, Sanzo and his comrades arrive in a village where they join and win a drinking competition.
39	"Misty Rain – Watering Sky"; Transliteration: "Ame" (Japanese: 雨)	January 9, 2001
Sanzo is gloomy and depressed in the never-ending rain. Goku worries Sanzo and tries but fails to cheer him up. Sanzo get more irritated and insults Goku. Upset, Goku runs out of the inn. Suddenly, Konzen, was Goku's guardian in the Celestial Heavens, appears in front of him.
40	"Twilight – The Gloomy Sun"; Transliteration: "Fukigen na taiyou" (Japanese: 不機嫌な太陽)	January 16, 2001
500 years ago. In the Celestial Heavens. Born from a stone, Goku was brought to Goddess of Mercy – Kanzeon Bosatsu. He was introduced to his guardian – Konzen Doji who is a handsome young man with beautiful blond hair. (Konzen is the previous existence of Sanzo.) He takes care of Goku just like his younger brother. Then, Goku meets a boy called Nataku. Even a small boy at Goku's age, Nataku is the Lord of War and is the only person in the Celestial Heavens, who is allowed to kill. He receives an order to subjugate the great monster, Bull Satan – Gyumao.
41	"Collage – A Silent tripple" Transliteration: "Shizuka naru hamon" (Japanese: 静かなる波紋)	January 23, 2001
One day Goku wants to see Nataku and sneaks into the Great Palace. He meets Kenren, the Commander General of the Army of Celestial Heavens. General Kenren is the previous existence of Sha-Gojyo. General Kenren is surprised to see Goku chained with weights on both hands and legs. Then, Nataku returns from the hunt of Gyumao. His body is covered with wounds. Goku worries Nataku. General Kenren suspects why all the soldiers who went for subjugation have no injuries.....
42	"Festival – Unforgettable Scenes"; Transliteration: "Wasure enu fuukei" (Japanese: 忘れえぬ風景)	January 30, 2001
Sanzo's party drop in a town called Saika on the day of Festival of God. They notice that the God the folks worship here is Shien. They do not know why, but Shien comes down to this place today every year. Lilin, a loyal follower of Kogaiji, learns from Ni-Jen-Yi that Shien and tow other Gods took the Hallowed Sutra from Gyokumen-Koshu. Lilin comes up to Saika and wages battle to Shien for the Hallowed SutraŠ.
43	"Tears – A Village of Illusion"; Transliteration: "Kyozou no machi" (Japanese: 虚像の街)	February 6, 2001
Zeon hears that One of the Sutras of World Commencement was found in a village. He visits the village to find if this news is true. Soon after he arrives there, Zeon helps a boy attacked by the monsters. He sees his own son's visage on this boy. Meanwhile in a neighboring village our heroes hear a rumor of a monster devouring human's spirits.
44	"Plunderer – Seizure of the Sutra of Dark Power"; Transliteration: "Kyoumon goudatsu" (Japanese: 経文強奪)	February 13, 2001
God Homura and his two fellow-Gods are ready to begin the Creation of New World. However, they need Sanzo's Sutra of Dark Power to accomplish their plan. Homura tells Sanzo to bestow the Sutra by the next morning. Sanzo has no intention to give it out. Our heroes know they will have hard battle against Gods. So, they have only shallow sleep. And the battle begins ....!
45	"Glorious Days – Before Dawn"; Transliteration: "Yoake mae" (Japanese: 夜明け前)	February 20, 2001
Five hundred years ago in the Celestial Heavens, Konzen – the previous existence of Sanzo – takes Goku to Tenpoh, Grand General of the entire force of the Celestial Heavens. Tenpo is the previous existence of Cho-Hakkai. Nataku, whose wounds have not healed, receives a new order of subjugation from Li-Tohten, the minister of the Celestial Heavens. General Kenren wants to take this order but he is refused and punished for his indecent behavior. Tenpoh is surprised at Kenren's reckless manner and becomes angered by Li-Tohten's selfish conduct.
46	"Chaos – Shaking Land"; Transliteration: "Yuragu daichi" (Japanese: 揺らぐ大地)	February 27, 2001
The Creation of New World of Homura, Shien. and Zeon has begun. Sanzo and his comrades go to the Tower of Konran, where Homura's party are supposed to wait for them. Instead, the heroes are attacked by monsters led by Gairu. The monsters are so weak and the battle quickly ends. When the heroes walk further, they know they have passed only a first easy barrier, and that more enemies are waiting.
47	"Guilty of Not Guilty"; Transliteration: "Kairitsu" (Japanese: 戒罪)	March 6, 2001
Goku single-handedly resists an attack of Homura's Royal Guards so his comrades can enter the tower to find Homura. The enemy uses an artifice called "Work of Repentance", forcing a person to remember past emotional hurts. Goku is stunned when he sees his mother-in-law crying in front of him.
48	"Absolutely Heaven! – Door to Freedom"; Transliteration: "Jiyuu e no tobira" (Japanese: 自由への扉)	March 13, 2001
Sanzo's party and Kogaiji's group confront Homura, Shien, and Zeon. Sanzo wants to take back his Sutra of Dark Power and Kogaiji has to get the Hallowed Sutra. Shien and Zeon decide to engage in battle side-by-side and send Homura to New World. When the battle begins, Shien releases his true power over to the heroes and Kogaiji's group.
49	"Missing Desire – Shining Paradise"; Transliteration: "Kazayaku rakuen" (Japanese: 輝く楽園)	March 20, 2001
Zeon follows Shien's performance and releases his true power. The combined power of the two gods overwhelms everybody on the battlefield. Sanzo quickly leaves the tower and follows Homura but he is ambushed by Goku, who is controlled by the "Work of Repentance". Without his head ring, Goku is wild and merciless, and attacks anyone in his way. Homura is about to step into the nearly completed New World.
50	"Alone – To the West"; Transliteration: "Nishi e" (Japanese: 西へ)	March 27, 2001
Goku returns to himself and jumps at Homura. Goku's power is greatly increased by his rage. Everybody thinks Goku has finished Homura with an explosive blow but Homura gets up again and takes the chains from his hands to release his true power. Homura's strength is devastating. Goku's comrades wants to help him but he says he is going to defeat the god by himself.

=== Saiyuki Reload (2003–04) ===
No. overall	No. in season	Title	Original release date
51	1	"Run - The Bullet Reloaded Again"; Transliteration: "Tama wa Futatabi Komerareta" (Japanese: 弾は 再び込められた)	October 2, 2003
52	2	"Wanted Dead or Alive - Moving Trap"; Transliteration: "Ugomeku Wana" (Japanese: うごめく罠)	October 9, 2003
53	3	"Lethal Weapon - The Strongest Enemy in History"; Transliteration: "Shijou Saikyou no Teki" (Japanese: 史上最強の敵)	October 16, 2003
54	4	"Negative Energy - Last Promise"; Transliteration: "Saigo no Yakusoku" (Japanese: 最後の約束)	October 23, 2003
55	5	"Voice - Sleeping Memory"; Transliteration: "Nemuru Omoide" (Japanese: 眠る思いで)	October 30, 2003
56	6	"Sad Memory - Rescue"; Transliteration: "Dakkan" (Japanese: 奪還)	November 6, 2003
57	7	"Little Will - Small Friend"; Transliteration: "Chiisana Aibou" (Japanese: 小さな相棒)	November 13, 2003
58	8	"Poison - Delicious Food"; Transliteration: "Oishii Ryouri" (Japanese: 美味しい料理)	November 20, 2003
59	9	"Self Defense - Misunderstood Castle"; Transliteration: "Ochinai Shiro" (Japanese: 落ちない城)	November 27, 2003
60	10	"Trick or Treak - Demon - Genjo Sanzo"; Transliteration: "Genjou Sanzou" (Japanese: 妖怪・玄奘三蔵)	December 4, 2003
61	11	"Mother - Pleasant Traces"; Transliteration: "Yasashii Omokage" (Japanese: 優しい面影)	December 11, 2003
62	12	"Tiny Dream - Mountain of Mysterious Disappearances"; Transliteration: "Kamikakushi no Yama" (Japanese: 神かしの山)	December 18, 2003
63	13	"Lovely Baby - Just a Tiny Tiny Story"; Transliteration: "Honno Chiisana Chiisana Ohanashi" (Japanese: ほんの小さなちいさなお話)	December 25, 2003
64	14	"Black Crow - Whisper of Darkness"; Transliteration: "Kurayami no Sasayaki" (Japanese: 暗闇のささやき)	January 8, 2004
65	15	"Secret Ambition - Premonition"; Transliteration: "Yokan" (Japanese: 予感)	January 15, 2004
66	16	"Opposite - Footprint"; Transliteration: "Ashiato" (Japanese: あしあと)	January 22, 2004
67	17	"Wish - Ungrantable Wish"; Transliteration: "Kanaerarenai Negai" (Japanese: 叶えられない 願い)	January 29, 2004
68	18	"Critical Day - Sorrowful Bonds"; Transliteration: "Kanashii Kizuna" (Japanese: 哀しい絆)	February 5, 2004
69	19	"Farewell"; Transliteration: "Kami-sama" (Japanese: カミサマ)	February 12, 2004
70	20	"Chase - Prelude"; Transliteration: "Jokyoku" (Japanese: 序曲)	February 19, 2004
71	21	"Don't Cry - Battle"; Transliteration: "Sentou" (Japanese: 戦闘)	February 26, 2004
72	22	"Pain - Breakable Things"; Transliteration: "Kudakareta Mono" (Japanese: 砕かれたもの)	March 4, 2004
73	23	"Dawn - Our Ways of Doing"; Transliteration: "Ore-tachi no Yarikata" (Japanese: オレ達のやり方)	March 11, 2004
74	24	"Go Ahead - Rematch"; Transliteration: "Saisen" (Japanese: 再戦)	March 18, 2004
75	25	"Nothing to Give - End"; Transliteration: "Kecchaku" (Japanese: 決着)	March 25, 2004

=== Saiyuki Reload GunLock (2004) ===
No. overall	No. in season	Title	Original release date
76	1	"Temple of Demons"; Transliteration: "Mamono ga Sumu Tera" (Japanese: 魔物が棲む寺)	April 1, 2004
77	2	"Nightmare Unleashed"; Transliteration: "Hanatareta Akumu" (Japanese: 放たれた悪夢)	April 8, 2004
78	3	"Raging Torrent"; Transliteration: "Gekiryuu" (Japanese: 激流)	April 15, 2004
79	4	"Encounter"; Transliteration: "Souguu" (Japanese: 遭遇)	April 22, 2004
80	5	"Combat"; Transliteration: "Tousou" (Japanese: 闘争)	April 29, 2004
81	6	"Awakening"; Transliteration: "Kakusei" (Japanese: 覚醒)	May 6, 2004
82	7	"Cursed Board Game"; Transliteration: "Noroi no sugoroku" (Japanese: 呪いの双六)	May 13, 2004
83	8	"The Red-Haired Woman"; Transliteration: "Akai kami no onna" (Japanese: 紅い髪の女)	May 20, 2004
84	9	"Showdown"; Transliteration: "Taiketsu" (Japanese: 対決)	May 27, 2004
85	10	"Buried Dream"; Transliteration: "Umoreta yume" (Japanese: 埋もれた夢)	June 3, 2004
86	11	"Hakkai Runs Away From Home?!"; Transliteration: "Hakkai no iede!?" (Japanese: 八戒の家出!?)	June 10, 2004
87	12	"Mansion of Marionettes"; Transliteration: "Karakuri no yakata" (Japanese: からくりの館)	June 17, 2004
88	13	"The Man From the West"; Transliteration: "Nishi kara kita otoko" (Japanese: 西から来た男)	June 24, 2004
89	14	"The Whereabouts of the Miracle"; Transliteration: "Kiseki no yukue" (Japanese: 奇跡の行方)	July 1, 2004
90	15	"To the Limits of Mourning"; Transliteration: "Tsuitou no hate ni" (Japanese: 追悼の果てに)	July 8, 2004
91	16	"Revival"; Transliteration: "Saisei" (Japanese: 再生)	July 15, 2004
92	17	"Onslaught"; Transliteration: "Shuugeki" (Japanese: 襲撃)	July 22, 2004
93	18	"Misgivings"; Transliteration: "Ginen" (Japanese: 疑念)	July 29, 2004
94	19	"Reminiscence"; Transliteration: "Tsuioku" (Japanese: 追憶)	August 5, 2004
95	20	"Rift"; Transliteration: "Kiretsu" (Japanese: 亀裂)	August 12, 2004
96	21	"The Man Who Was Revived"; Transliteration: "Yomigaerishi otoko" (Japanese: 蘇りし男)	August 19, 2004
97	22	"Strategy"; Transliteration: "Sakuryaku" (Japanese: 策略)	August 26, 2004
98	23	"Breakthrough"; Transliteration: "Toppokou" (Japanese: 突破口)	September 2, 2004
99	24	"Mortal Combat"; Transliteration: "Shitou" (Japanese: 死闘)	September 9, 2004
100	25	"The Thing That Should Be Protected"; Transliteration: "Mamoru bekimono" (Japanese: 守るべきもの)	September 16, 2004
101	26	"Lamentation"; Transliteration: "Doukoku" (Japanese: 慟哭)	September 23, 2004

=== Saiyuki Reload Blast (2017) ===
No. overall	No. in season	Title	Directed by	Written by	Storyboarded by	Original release date
102	1	"Squall"; Transliteration: "Toppū" (Japanese: 突風)	Hiroyuki Okuno	Kenji Konuta	Shigeyuki Miya	July 5, 2017
103	2	"Cloud Mirror"; Transliteration: "Unkyō" (Japanese: 雲鏡)	Hideaki Nakano	Kenji Konuta	Hideaki Nakano	July 12, 2017
104	3	"Sky Burial"; Transliteration: "Tensō" (Japanese: 天葬)	Yoshinobu Tokumoto	Kenji Konuta	Takashi Kobayashi	July 19, 2017
105	4	"Nataku"; Transliteration: "Nata" (Japanese: 哪吒)	Satoshi Saga	Kenji Konuta	Hideaki Nakano	July 26, 2017
106	5	"Flower Banquet"; Transliteration: "Kaen" (Japanese: 花宴)	Yoshinobu Tokumoto	Kenji Konuta	Yoshinobu Tokumoto	August 2, 2017
107	6	"Promise"; Transliteration: "Yakusoku" (Japanese: 約束)	Hideaki Nakano	Kenji Konuta	Hideaki Nakano	August 9, 2017
108	7	"Kouten"; Transliteration: "Kōten" (Japanese: 恒天)	Hiroyuki Okuno	Kenji Konuta	Hiroyuki Okuno	August 16, 2017
109	8	"Barrier"; Transliteration: "Kekkai" (Japanese: 結界)	Shunsuke Machitani	Kenji Konuta	Shunsuke Machitani	August 23, 2017
110	9	"A Chance Encounter"; Transliteration: "Kaigō" (Japanese: 邂逅)	Hiroyuki Okuno; Akira Katō	Kenji Konuta	Yoshinobu Tokumoto	August 30, 2017
111	10	"Imperial Order"; Transliteration: "Chokumei" (Japanese: 勅命)	Hideaki Nakano	Kenji Konuta	Hideaki Nakano	September 6, 2017
112	11	"Raid"; Transliteration: "Shūgeki" (Japanese: 襲撃)	Satoshi Saga	Kenji Konuta	Satoshi Saga	September 13, 2017
113	12	"Haiten"; Transliteration: "Haiten" (Japanese: 背天)	Hideaki Nakano	Kenji Konuta	Hideaki Nakano	September 20, 2017

=== Saiyuki Reload: Zeroin (2022) ===
No. overall	No. in season	Title	Directed by	Written by	Storyboarded by	Original release date
114	1	"The Blue-Eyed Angel"; Transliteration: "Aoi Me no Tenshi" (Japanese: 青い目の天使)	Misato Takada	Michiko Yokote	Misato Takada, Hirokazu Hisayuki	January 6, 2022
115	2	"The Value of Life"; Transliteration: "Inochi no Kachi" (Japanese: 命の価値)	Misato Takada	Michiko Yokote	Misato Takada	January 13, 2022
116	3	"Humans and Demons"; Transliteration: "Ningen to Yōkai" (Japanese: 人間と妖怪)	Tatsuji Yamazaki	Aya Matsui	Sō Toyama	January 20, 2022
117	4	"Options"; Transliteration: "Sentaku" (Japanese: 選択)	Misato Takada	Aya Matsui	Sō Toyama	January 27, 2022
118	5	"The One That Came Back"; Transliteration: "Kaette Kita Aitsu" (Japanese: 帰ってきたアイツ)	Fumiaki Usui, Misato Takada	Aya Matsui	Fumiaki Usui, Misato Takada	February 3, 2022
119	6	"The Right to Life"; Transliteration: "Inochi no Kenri" (Japanese: 命の権利)	Tetsuya Watanabe	Michiko Yokote	Tetsuya Watanabe	February 10, 2022
120	7	"Seiten Taisei"; Transliteration: "Seiten Taisei" (Japanese: 斉天大聖)	Tatsuji Yamazaki, Misato Takada	Michiko Yokote	Hirokazu Hisayuki, Misato Takada	February 17, 2022
121	8	"Oasis"; Transliteration: "Oashisu" (Japanese: オアシス)	Misato Takada	Aya Matsui	Hirokazu Hisayuki	February 24, 2022
122	9	"Even a Worm Will Turn"; Transliteration: "Issun no Mushi ni mo Gobu no Tamashī" (Japanese: 一寸の虫にも五分の魂)	Haruka Saiga	Aya Matsui	Ai Yoshimura	March 3, 2022
123	10	"Atonement"; Transliteration: "Tsugunai" (Japanese: 償い)	Yasushi Muroya	Michiko Yokote	Yasushi Muroya	March 10, 2022
124	11	"The Next Sunrise"; Transliteration: "Tsugi ni Noboru Taiyō" (Japanese: 次にのぼる太陽)	Misato Takada	Aya Matsui	Misato Takada	March 17, 2022
125	12	"A Memory Revealed"; Transliteration: "Akasareru Kioku" (Japanese: 明かされる記憶)	Tetsuya Watanabe	Aya Matsui	Tetsuya Watanabe	March 24, 2022
126	13	"The Sanzo Party"; Transliteration: "Sanzō Ikkō" (Japanese: 三蔵一行)	Seiki Takuno, Fumiaki Usui, Misato Takada	Michiko Yokote	Tetsuya Watanabe, Hirokazu Hisayuki, Misato Takada	March 31, 2022

== OVAs ==
=== Saiyuki Premium (1999) ===
No.	Title	Original release date
1	"Premium OVA Part 1"	April 23, 1999
2	"Premium OVA Part 2"	February 5, 2000

=== Saiyuki: Kibō no Zaika (2002) ===
No.	Title	Original release date
1	"Saiyuki Interactive (Japanese: 幻想魔伝 最遊記 ―希望の罪過―)"	September 19, 2002
A mysterious light falls from the Heavens. It's the Pearl Jade. It can grant any wish. Dr. Ni tells Gyokumen Koushu about it. Lirin overhears and tells Kougaiji. Then Kanzeon Bosatsu (The Merciful Goddess) requests "orders" Sanzo and company to go and find and seal it before it falls into the wrong hands.

=== Saiyuki Reload: Burial (2007–08) ===
No.	Title	Original release date
1	"Part 1: Ukoku's chapter"	April 27, 2007
1	"Part 2: Genjo Sanzo's chapter"	April 27, 2007
2	"Son Goku's chapter"	September 28, 2007
3	"Gojyo and Hakkai's chapter"	March 28, 2008

=== Saiyuki Gaiden (2011–13) ===
No.	Title	Original release date
1	"Episode 1"	March 25, 2011
Heaven, where the gods live. In that world where 'death' doesn't even exist, Konzen Douji spent his days, bored. However, his life begins to change with the introduction of a golden-eyed boy. Standing at Kanzeon Bosatsu's side, they said he was born from the Lower World from a stone. Konzen was charged with looking after the innocent boy. He began to sense a change in his life, even as he was irritated with being toyed with. The boy became friends with the young War Prince, Nataku. The boy later receives the name "Goku" from Konzen, and they became close with Tenpou and Kenren of Heaven's Western Army. Shocked by the tragic death of Nataku, Goku's true raw power was released in the form of the "Seiten Taisei" when his youkai power limiter, his golden diadem, was broken. A massacre occurred and those in the area were overwhelmed by his destructive power. Kanzeon Bosatsu knocked the beast out, but Konzen Douji stepped in to stop her. However, for protecting Goku, Konzen, Kenren, and Tenpou were made enemies of Heaven. They took their commanding officer, the Dragon King of the Western Ocean, Goujun, hostage and they attempted to flee to the Lower World. The four of them--Konzen, Goku, Kenren and Tenpou--promised that "We'll always be together," "Even if we get separated, we'll meet again beneath the sakura in the Lower World." The four headed for the only path connecting Heaven and the Lower World: the Dimension Gate. They released Goujun as Tenpou and Kenren gave their report to him telling him that they will resign in their positions. The four of them entered the Heavenly Palace and encountered Enrai's unit, Western Army Second Unit, but thanks to the Western Army First Unit who barged in and fight to help their superiors escape. In Tenpou's last order, he ordered them to kill all Second Unit in the room and do not let a single person who'd seen them leave alive. After Tenpou and Kenren left, Rikuou encouraged his fellow First Unit that they will complete the mission and it will be their final battle.
2	"Episode 2"	June 24, 2011
Tenpou and Kenren invited Konzen and Goku to have a picnic under the cherry blossoms. While they were having a picnic, Kenren challenge Goku to climb the tree. The conversation later on goes about the cherry blossoms. Kenren mentioned that Cherry Blossoms in lower world are different from those of Heaven. Different in the way they bloom they fall. This made Konzen curious and wanted to see how they bloom in the lower world. Goku didn't understand what Kenren was trying to say, Konzen's words made Goku's heart tighten for a moment. And without realizing, Goku's branch where he standing broke and fell on Konzen's head. Back to the present, at that time, Li Touten's comrade assassinated the Heavenly Emperor. The blame fell on Konzen and the rest, and they were attacked by the 'Natakus', the failed man-made weapons that didn't become 'Prince Nataku.' Kenren acted as bait, and let the other three escapes. Kenren struggled against the Natakus, but he was mortally wounded, and fell. The three managed to infiltrate into the lowest level of the Heavenly Palace. However, the Gate had been placed under heavy guard. There, Tenpou decided to draw the attack of the Gate guards himself in order to allow Konzen and Goku to go on ahead. Meanwhile, Kenren found himself bloody and suffering from fatal wounds. Goujun, his superior, found him among the carnage having a smoke. He asked Kenren about these beasts and he more or less told Goujun that he and Tenpou had been suspecting something similar to what he saw before him from the start. Goujun told Kenren to surrender, and Kenren, never being one to let sleeping dogs lie, challenged Goujun instead, even in his state. He planned to go down fighting. But it turns out that not all of the Natakus were dead. One was still alive. Kenren saved Goujun by pushing him down a shaft and told the beast that he felt pity for it and that it should eat him and make sure nothing of him was left. All the Nataku beast were suffering creatures. The crying beast killed Kenren as Goujun gave him a salute as a sign of his respect.
3	"Episode 3"	November 25, 2011
Tenpou was enjoying the battle, the numbers were too uneven and he suffered a fatal wound. He took care of all the guards, but in a duel with the remaining Sho'u, Tenpou too, as though chasing after Kenren, met his end. Goku and Konzen reached the Dimension Gate. After surviving various hardships, they finally managed to open it. However, they came up against Li Touten's resistance, and Konzen sent Goku through first. Konzen tried desperately to make it through as the Gate rapidly began to close, but only Goku got out on the other side. Konzen promised Goku, "Next time I'll reach out my hands to you!" and disappeared into golden ashes that crushed in the Gate. Time went by, and Heaven sought to restore order. The Heavenly Emperor had died, the Heavenly Palace was destroyed, the Thousand-Year Cherry Blossom petals had scattered. The people and the army were all thrown into chaos. Amid all this, Kanzeon Bosatsu remained stolidly on the Lower World-side of the Dimension Gate, gently holding the despairing Goku, and sealed his memories away. All of his memories were erased except for his name 'Goku'. The punishment imposed upon Goku was '500 years of loneliness.' Deprived of his memories and shackled, Goku was sealed in a mountaintop stone prison, as countless seasons went by. And when 500 years have passed, a shining figure appears before Goku's eyes, and holds out a hand. Goku reaches a hand toward the light, Genjo Sanzo.
4	"Saiyuki Gaiden: Kouga no Shou"	April 26, 2013
Kanzeon Bosatsu was wandering in the demolished private library of Tenpou when she found Goku's drawing of him with Tenpou, Konzen and Kenren under the cherry blossoms. Later on, the scene changes back few years ago. Tenpou joined the Western Army when he was appointed to be a Field Marshal. It was then when Tenpou and General Kenren met for the first time. It was then the start of their journey and encountering major events that shakes the whole heavenly place. Tenpou recalls the event what happened on his journey and missions along with his unit who cannot leave him alone. Later on, we see Tenpou brought his unit to the lower world to a secret barbecue or grilled steak restaurant with their new member Souko. The First Unit's Final Battle, Another scene also was shown, that Li Touten was being oppressed by his superior when Kenren stopped the superior. Kenren offered his hand to help Li Touten to stand up but slapped his hand instead. Tenpou appeared on Kenren's back and explained Li Touten's background. Later on, Li Touten was seen going down the basement (Natakus room) when his wife saw him. Li Touten showed and introduced their son, Nataku ---was made from the combined genetic material of Lower World Youkai and Heaven's gods, making them Heretics---. After years, Li Touten introduced his son, The War Prince Nataku to the Heaven's Emperor. There's also a scene that was shown, during the event of Tenpou's last order. The rest of the First Unit was fighting against Enrai's men stating that they will fight until all of them died.
