= List of Wild Adapter chapters =

The cover of Wild Adapter volume 1 as released by Tokuma Shoten on July 25, 2001, in Japan.

This is a list of chapters of the manga Wild Adapter, written by Kazuya Minekura and published by Tokuma Shoten in the Chara bimonthly magazine. The first chapter appeared in April, 2000 and it is an ongoing series. There are currently six volumes released. The bimonthly release of new chapters, along with the author's various health-related hiatuses have led to the relatively slow release rate of the manga. Other companies have been slow to pick up Wild Adapter, such as Taiwan's Sharp Point Press in February 2006, Singapore's Chuang Yi in April 2004, and America's Tokyopop in January 2007, leading to the accelerated release of subsequent volumes to catch up with Japan.

== Volume list ==
No.	Original release date	Original ISBN	English release date	English ISBN
1	July 25, 2001	978-4-19-960161-3	February 13, 2007	978-1-59816-978-2
Dice 01 - 06; Extra: "A drugstore"; Volume tagline: I saw a dead cat. He should have come to this world to scatter his guts. I would die in this way.; Colour Theme: Red
Kubota Makoto is a 17-year-old who becomes the leader of the youth group of the Izumokai yakuza group, learning the ropes from Komiya Nobuo, his second-in-command. Amid days of collecting protection money, checking on brothels, winning in mahjong parlours and beating up members of rival gang Toujougumi, there is a rumour on the streets of 'W·A', a drug so powerful that it turns its users into animals and causes their organs and bodies to explode, and so mysterious nobody knows where it comes from. Both gangs are fighting to gain control of the drug source, and when Komiya's mother comes into contact with it he decides to investigate the drug. He is quickly killed in the process, and Kubota decides to leave the gang on his advice. Soon after Kubota picks up a stray cat, and thus begins the story of Wild Adapter.
2	August 1, 2002	978-4-19-960190-3	June 12, 2007	978-1-59816-979-9
Dice 07 - 12; Volume tagline: We were given shapes each, when we were born. And live under it, trying to keep somehow. Till the end we melt away; Colour Theme: Yellow
One year after Kubota picks up his stray cat, Tokitoh Minoru, who has amnesia, they are now roommates in Kubota's apartment. One night, Ookubo Saori, a pregnant runaway teenage girl sleeps over at their apartment before leaving to look for her boyfriend. Kubota and Tokitoh meet Saori again while investigating victims of the drug W·A; none of which have survived and one of them is Saori's boyfriend. The Toujougumi group is hot on the heels of Saori's boyfriend and abducts Saori to find out more about W·A. Tokitoh rushes to her rescue but gets beaten up as well until Kubota arrives to save the day.
3	December 1, 2003	978-4-19-960233-7	October 9, 2007	978-1-59816-980-5
Dice 13 - 18; Extra; Volume tagline: Our Lord, please show me the beautiful world that thou had seen before; Colour Theme: Purple
Kubota and Tokitoh have a new tip in their ongoing investigation of W·A, a cult that specialises in animal worship and claims to use the drug W·A. They team up with Takizawa Ryouji, a reporter to go undercover to investigate the cult. It turns out the cult is really a yakuza-related scam to get members addicted to drugs, and a trap to seek out information about W·A, while Takizawa is actually investigating the fake cult leader who is his estranged sister. The cult leader is eventually exposed and arrested, while Kubota and Tokitoh are left knowing no better about W·A.
4	August 1, 2005	978-4-19-960289-4	February 12, 2008	978-1-59816-981-2
Dice 19 - 25; Extra; Volume tagline: Do you believe in words? As soon as you speak it, words have the power to make it happen.; Colour Theme: Lime Green
Kubota is mistaken for the killer of a prostitute that he was assigned to deliver drugs to, and is taken under custody for questioning. Meanwhile, Tokitoh meets Anna, Kubota's friend, who is frantically looking for Kubota for help in a matter but both are unable to locate Kubota as they have no idea that Kubota is detained at the police station. Tokitoh goes to Takizawa the reporter and Kou, the owner of a Chinatown drugstore for help in locating Kubota, and eventually they discover that the killed prostitute is Anna's friend Rika whom Anna was trying to help, and also track down the real killer, one of Rika's clients. The real killer is arrested and Kubota is released.
5	August 1, 2006	978-4-19-960319-8	May 13, 2008	978-1-4278-0219-4
Dice 26 - 33; Volume tagline: One knows it is so precious, when one fears to lose it; Colour Theme: Turquoise
This is a flashback dating back to when Kubota had just picked Tokitoh up. Kubota, having quit the Izumokai group, finds a stranger unconscious in a back alley and brings him home. He looks after the stranger until the stranger wakes up, realises he has amnesia and no idea why his right hand is a furry paw similar to the bodies that have exploded due to W·A poisoning. Kubota names the stranger Tokitoh, and they learn to get used to living with each other, as Tokitoh is like a wild cat who is very wary of humans. Tokitoh also makes friends with their neighbour, a boy called Shouta. One day Kubota is attacked and injured by some gang members, and Tokitoh goes to his aid. After this they are more comfortable with each other, thus becoming closer and start their investigations of the drug W·A, as well as of Tokitoh's true identity.
6	February 25, 2008	978- 4-19-960367-9	November 1, 2008	978-1-4278-1311-4
Dice 34 - 41; Volume tagline: Let me go under the deep of the sea, if it is a future of mine to live without you; Colour Theme: Maroon
Tokitoh is kidnapped by the members of Kubota's former youth group, under the orders of his previous employer, Sanada, the leader of the Izumokai group. Kubota storms the Izumokai headquarters and finds out Tokitoh is held on board an oil tanker out at sea. He then sneaks on board through a refueling ship, and proceeds to kill all the gang members on the ship, including his previous subordinates, before rescuing Tokitoh.
