= The Canterville Ghost (2021 TV series) =

TV series about the Canterville Ghost

- Based on: "The Canterville Ghost"; 1887 short story by Oscar Wilde
- Screenplay by: Jude Tindall
- Directed by: Paul Gibson; Suri Krishnamma
- Starring: Tom Graves; Joe Graves; Caroline Catz
- Composer: Paul Englishby
- Country of origin: United Kingdom
- Original language: English
- No. of episodes: 4

Production
- Executive producer: Will Trotter
- Producer: Sue Howells
- Cinematography: Tom Hines
- Editors: Louise Pearson; Simon Prentice; Amy Swan

Original release
- Network: Five, BYUtv
- Release: 31 October – 21 November 2021

The Canterville Ghost is a 2021 British BBC Studios and American BYUtv television series based on the short story The Canterville Ghost by Oscar Wilde. In the UK, the series was broadcast on Channel 5 in 2022 and has been made available for digital purchase on Amazon Video.

== Plot ==
Resident ghost Sir Simon de Canterville is none-too-pleased when an American family moves into his family's grand English estate after tech billionaire Hiram Otis purchases it. Hiram has no idea that Simon has been haunting the grounds for five centuries nor that his family is about to face the enmity of the local aristocracy. This modern retelling of the classic tale focuses on three families: the aristocratic Cantervilles, the Romani Lovells and the American Otises.

== Cast ==
- Caroline Catz as Lucy Otis
- Fred Fergus as Viscount Ralph Stilton
- Tom Graves as Theodore Otis
- Joe Graves as Franklin Otis
- Haydn Gwynne as Lady Deborah de Canterville
- Anthony Head as Sir Simon de Canterville
- Jack Bardoe as The Honorable Cecil Canterville
- James Lance as Hiram Otis
- Carolyn Pickles as Mrs. Umney
- Jeff Rawle as Duke George 'Bluey' Stilton
- Charlotte Robinson as Charity Lovell
- Harriette Robinson as Patience Lovell
- Harry Taurasi as Django Lovell
- Laurel Waghorn as Virginia Otis

== Episodes ==
No.	Title	Directed by	Written by	Original release date	U.K. viewers (millions)
1	"Spring/Summer"	Paul Gibson	Jude Tindall	October 31, 2021	N/A
2	"Summer/Autumn"	Suri Krishnamma	Jude Tindall	November 7, 2021	N/A
3	"Autumn/Winter"	Paul Gibson	Jude Tindall	November 14, 2021	N/A
4	"Winter"	Suri Krishnamma	Jude Tindall	November 21, 2021	N/A

== Reception ==
The series won an award for Outstanding Makeup and Hairstyling in the 2022 Children's and Family Emmy Awards.
