= Bus Gamer =

Japanese manga

- Cover of Tokyopop's release of the manga
- Genre: Suspense
- Manga
- Written by: Kazuya Minekura
- Published by: Ichijinsha
- English publisher: NA/UK: Tokyopop
- Magazine: Comic Rex
- Original run: 1999 – 2001
- Volumes: 1
- Original video animation
- Directed by: Naoyuki Kazuya
- Studio: Anpro
- Released: March 14, 2008 – March 28, 2008
- Episodes: 3

Bus Gamer (stylized as BUS GAMER) is a Japanese manga series created by Kazuya Minekura. It only exists as a single volume 'Pilot Edition' due to difficulties in serialization. The manga has been licensed for North American distribution by Tokyopop. The series follows the story of three young men hired by a mysterious company to participate in a business game, in which companies gamble against each other for corporate secrets. It has also produced a drama CD featuring the voices of Kenichi Suzumura, Junichi Suwabe, and Hiroki Takahashi. An anime adaptation of the manga premiered on the Japanese television network KBS Kyoto between March 14 and March 28, 2008, airing a total of three episodes. It is directed by Naoyuki Kuzuya, produced by Frontier Works, and animated by Anpro. The characters are voiced by the same voice actors in the drama CD.

== Plot ==
An illegal dog-fight conducted in strict secrecy, the Bus Game is a battle simulation game where gamers are selected by various corporations to compete three-on-three on a battleground which is usually inside Tokyo. The teams are divided into "HOME" and "AWAY". The "HOME" team is given a CD containing their corporation's secret files to protect while the "AWAY" team attempts to steal the CD. The "AWAY" team wins if they are able to steal the CD within the given time limit where the "HOME" team wins if they are able to keep their CD safe. The game information and details are distributed to the gamers via mini-disk. The businesses participating in the Bus Game wager large amounts of money on each game, watching the action from a distance. In other words, the Bus Games is a gambling pastime in which the gamers are pawns for their amusement. In exchange for putting their lives at stake, the gamers stand to gain large amount of money, through their contracts and through winning each match of the Bus Game.

When three complete strangers, Toki Mishiba, Nobuto Nakajyo, and Kazuo Saitoh, are hired by a corporation to compete in the Bus Game, they are given the team code of "Team A" (Triple Anonymous or No Name). This group of three who differ entirely from their living environment and values to protect each other's lives—but without mutually wiping out their mistrust of each other or prying into each other's privacy, it would be the worst sort of teamwork, conflicting in every way. They only have one point in common, simply that each of them need a large amount of money for their individual circumstances. And to get the large monetary award, they must play in the game despite their very own lives being at stake.

== Characters ==
Clockwise from top: Nobuto Nakajyo, Toki Mishiba, and Kazuo Saitoh.

Toki Mishiba (美柴 鴇, Mishiba Toki) Voiced by: Suzumura Kenichi

- Age: 22
- Birthday: February 14, 1989
- Residency: Shizuoka prefecture

Mishiba is a student at a Design trade school. He was raised in an Aikido dojo, resulting in him excelling at martial arts; he is a second degree black belt in karate; fourth in Aikido; and first in Kendo. He is short, lanky, reticent, and has an expressionless appearance. He barely talks, but he is always sleepy or hungry, and would sometimes just zone out. He works part-time as a tape copier and as a bartender at a bar where his surrogate older brother is the manager, who is the only person he confides in. He lives alone in a one room apartment, and the circumstances of his family are unknown, though it seems he had a twin brother named "Shigi". His favorite food is salmon, and when he eats salmon onigiri his mood gets better, though he does not show it.

Nobuto Nakajyo (中条 伸人, Nakajyo Nobuto) Voiced by: Suwabe Junichi

- Age: 24
- Birthday: March 23, 1987
- Residency: Chiba prefecture
- Special Skill: Strategy games, theft, street fighting (received training during his gang tenure)

Nakajyo is a college student, and is part of a medical faculty. He is his family's third son, and the heir to a serious illness hospital. However, due to his delinquent attitude and willingness to shed other's blood, he has been legally disowned, and currently does not go to college. He is tall and muscular, and usually has his hair covering his eyes. He lives in a six-foot apartment, where a different woman is usually present whenever he is there.

Cool and completely realistic, he is a nihilist who has great confidence in himself. However, he is good at taking care of people, and as the eldest, he exists as the leader of AAA. He has experience in brawls rather than grappling, and he does not hesitate in the face of violence. Although he has accepted equal responsibility as an active team member, he shows signs of the possibility that he might abandon AAA if it was to his personal advantage. He likes to drink alcohol, and is a heavy smoker. He holds 2 or more jobs at a day labor place as a manual laborer, works as a lecturer in a shogi classroom, and is also a guard.

Kazuo Saitoh (斉藤 一雄, Saitō Kazuo) Voiced by: Hiroki Takahashi

- Age: 18
- Birthday: July 18, 1992
- Residency: Tokyo

Saitoh is a senior in high school, making him the youngest of the team despite his height. He is the only son of the Saitoh house, and helps run a small electronics store. He lost both of his parents at a very young age, though he still has a very carefree and energetic attitude. Though Nakajyo and Mishiba initially find him irritating, they grow quite fond of him, but since he does not have any physical strengths, he is usually a burden to them during fights. However, he is, in fact, good with electronics and machines, and excels at the ability to reason through puzzles and memory problems. His favorite foods are hamburgers and spaghetti. He also works as the convenience store clerk at his school.

== Media ==
=== Manga ===
The Bus Gamer manga series is created by Kazuya Minekura, and only exists as a single volume 'Pilot Edition' due to difficulties in serialization. Only eleven chapters of the series were ever published before Comic Rex, the magazine in which it was serialized in, went under. While Minekura claims in the re-released Pilot Edition to still have interest in finishing the series, and characters from it appear in her regularly released art books, no word has been given on when the series will be picked up again. A tribute to Saiyuki, one of Minekura's other works, was seen on page 185 of Bus Gamer - the Pilot Edition, where Saitoh is seen challenging Keiko on a Saiyuki arcade game; she plays the character Sha Gojyo, while he plays Chin Yisou.

=== Anime ===
An anime adaptation of the manga premiered on the Japanese network KBS Kyoto between March 14 and March 28, 2008, airing a total of three episodes. It is directed by Naoyuki Kuzuya, produced by Frontier Works, and animated by Anpro. The anime features artwork by Kazuya Minekura, who also continued the story and supervised the scripts and productions.

== See also ==
- Battle Royale (film)
