= A Voyage Round My Father =

Play written by John Mortimer

Cover of DVD release of 1982 production

A Voyage Round My Father is an autobiographical play by John Mortimer, originally written for radio (1963) and subsequently adapted for television (1969 and 1982) and for the London stage (1970, 1971–72 and 2006). The central role of the father – Clifford Mortimer, a barrister who has gone blind but is determined to ignore the fact – has been played by Roger Livesey, Mark Dignam, Alec Guinness, Michael Redgrave, Laurence Olivier, Derek Jacobi and Rupert Everett.

== Background ==
John Mortimer studied law to oblige his father, Clifford, a blind barrister who hoped his son could help him in his practice in the Middle Temple. By the time Mortimer was called to the Bar in 1948 he had published his first novel and it became plain that his principal career would be as a writer, although he continued to practise law also. He drew extensively on his legal background in his writing, and his first play, The Dock Brief (1957), written for BBC Radio, centred on a barrister and his client. It was subsequently adapted for television: the critic Bernard Levin described it as a masterpiece: "more moving, more funny and more profound than anything I have yet seen by courtesy of the seventh art". It was performed on 280 foreign radio stations and won the Prix Italia prize in 1958. Further plays, for radio, television and the theatre followed.

== Premieres ==
Originally a 45-minute radio play with the title A Voyage Around My Father, it was broadcast on the Third Programme on Christmas Day 1963. The Radio Times summed it up: "A son recalls his dead father with irony, with humour, and above all, with affection." Roger Livesey played the father, William Squire, the son, with other parts played by Olga Lindo, Earle Grey, Alexander John and Anthony Viccars. It was produced by Nesta Pain. A year later the BBC broadcast a second production, again with Livesey, with a cast that included Hugh David as the son, Andrew Sachs, Garard Green and Gabriel Woolf. (Note: Livesey also starred in Mortimer's Personality Split in 1964, another radio play directed by Pain, in which "A young man finds himself undecided between the gentle charm of the law and the more flamboyant appeal of the film world".) Mortimer and Pain adapted the script as an eighty-minute television play, broadcast on BBC Two in October 1969. Claude Whatham directed, and the cast was headed by Mark Dignam and Ian Richardson as Clifford and John Mortimer.

Mortimer then adapted the piece for the stage, shortening the preposition in the title from "around" to "round". The premiere was at the Greenwich Theatre on 25 November 1970. Whatham again directed and Dignam reprised his Clifford with David Wood as the son. The author further revised the text for the West End premiere of the play. It opened on 4 August 1971 at the Theatre Royal Haymarket with Alec Guinness and Jeremy Brett as father and son. The production, directed by Ronald Eyre, was recast during the run and from April 1972 Michael Redgrave took over the role of Clifford. The play ran for 498 performances, closing on 14 October.

In 1982 Mortimer turned the play back into a film for television. It was produced by Thames Television for ITV; Laurence Olivier played the father, Alan Bates the son, Elizabeth Sellars the mother and Jane Asher Elizabeth. Alvin Rakoff directed.

In June 2006, the stage play was revived at the Donmar Warehouse with Derek Jacobi and Dominic Rowan; it transferred to Wyndham's Theatre in September. Thea Sharrock directed and the cast was headed by Derek Jacobi as Clifford. A 2023 revival, directed by Richard Eyre, was presented at the Theatre Royal, Bath, subsequently touring to Richmond, Cambridge, Cardiff, Malvern, Chichester and Nottingham. It starred Rupert Everett as the father, with Jack Bardoe as the son, Eleanor David as the mother, Allegra Marland as Elizabeth and Julian Wadham as the headmaster.

== Television and London stage casts ==
Role	BBC Television, 1969	Greenwich Theatre, 1970	Haymarket, 1971	Haymarket, 1972	Thames TV, 1982	Donmar, 2006
Father	Mark Dignam	Mark Dignam	Alec Guinness	Michael Redgrave	Laurence Olivier	Derek Jacobi
Mother	Daphne Oxenford	Betty Huntley-Wright	Leueen MacGrath	Jane Baxter	Elizabeth Sellars	Joanna David
Son (grown up)	Ian Richardson	David Wood	Jeremy Brett	Barry Justice	Alan Bates	Dominic Rowan
Elizabeth	Amanda Murray	Amanda Murray	Nicola Pagett	Amanda Murray	Jane Asher	Natasha Little
Son (as a boy)	Timothy Good	Jason Kemp	Jason Kemp	Jason Kemp	Alan Cox	Lewis Aaltonen
Reigate	John Lucas	Christopher Reynalds	Jeremy Burring	Jeremy Burring	James Downer	Alexander Barnett
Iris	Melanie Wallis	Juliet Marshall	Melanie Wallace	Melanie Wallace		Katie Warren
Headmaster	Arthur Lowe	John Nettleton	Jack May	Jack May	Michael Aldridge	Christopher Benjamin
George		James Ottaway	Jack May	Colin Jeavons		Osmund Bullock
Ham	Royston Tickner	Stanley Lebor	Mark Kingston	Colin Jeavons	Norman Bird	Osmund Bullock
Boustead		Stanley Lebor	Mark Kingston	Colin Jeavons	Jonathan Newth	Osmund Bullock
Sparks		Trevor Bannister	Mark Kingston	Colin Jeavons		Jamie De Courcey
Mr Morrow		Trevor Bannister	Mark Kingston	Andrew Sachs		Neil Boorman
Lady Visitor		Shirley Dynevor	Phyllida Law			
Matron			Phyllida Law	Tilly Tremayne		Lily Bevan
Miss Cox	Yvonne Gilan	Shirley Dynevor	Phyllida Law	Tilly Tremayne	Susan Littler	Lily Bevan
Doris		Susan Field	Phyllida Law	Tilly Tremayne		Sadie Shimmin
Social Worker		Susan Field	Phyllida Law	Rosalind Knight		
Mrs Reigate			Rhoda Lewis	Rosalind Knight		Sadie Shimmin
Miss Baker	Janet Hargreaves	Romy Baskerville	Rhoda Lewis	Rosalind Knight	Gay Wilde	Sadie Shimmin
First ATS Girl		Shirley Dynevor	Rhoda Lewis	Rosalind Knight	Ann Davies	Katie Warren
Witness	Sheila Beckett	Susan Field	Rhoda Lewis	Connie Merrigold	Jennie Goossens	Sadie Shimmin
Ringer Lean	George Moon	James Ottaway	Andrew Sachs	Andrew Sachs	Harold Goodwin	Neil Boorman
Mr Thong		James Ottaway	Andrew Sachs	Andrew Sachs	Malcolm Terris	Neil Boorman
Film Director		Stanley Lebor	Andrew Sachs	Andrew Sachs	Anthony Sharp	Neil Boorman
Japhet		Trevor Bannister	Richard Fraser	Richard Fraser	Albert Welling	Jamie de Courcey
First Judge	Ernest Hare	James Ottaway	Richard Fraser	Richard Fraser	Esmond Knight	Jamie de Courcey
Second Judge	Walter Horsbrugh	Trevor Bannister	Richard Fraser	Richard Fraser	Raymond Huntley	Osmund Bullock
Captain Wrothsley	Ian Cooper					
Barrister	David Morrell					
Chippy			Richard Fraser	Richard Fraser		
Doctor	Kevin Stoney	Stanley Lebor	Richard Fraser	Richard Fraser	Patrick Barr	Osmund Bullock
Second ATS Girl		Romy Baskerville	Tilly Tremayne	Gloria Connell	Judy Riley	Lily Bevan

== Notes, references and sources ==
=== Sources ===
- Grove, Valerie (2010). "Introduction". A Voyage Round My Father. London: Penguin. ISBN 9780141193410.
- Herbert, Ian, ed. (1977). Who's Who in the Theatre (sixteenth ed.). London and Detroit: Pitman Publishing and Gale Research. ISBN 978-0-273-00163-8.
- Mortimer, John (2010). A Voyage Round My Father. London: Penguin. ISBN 9780141193410.
