= Arthur McBain =

British actor and children's author

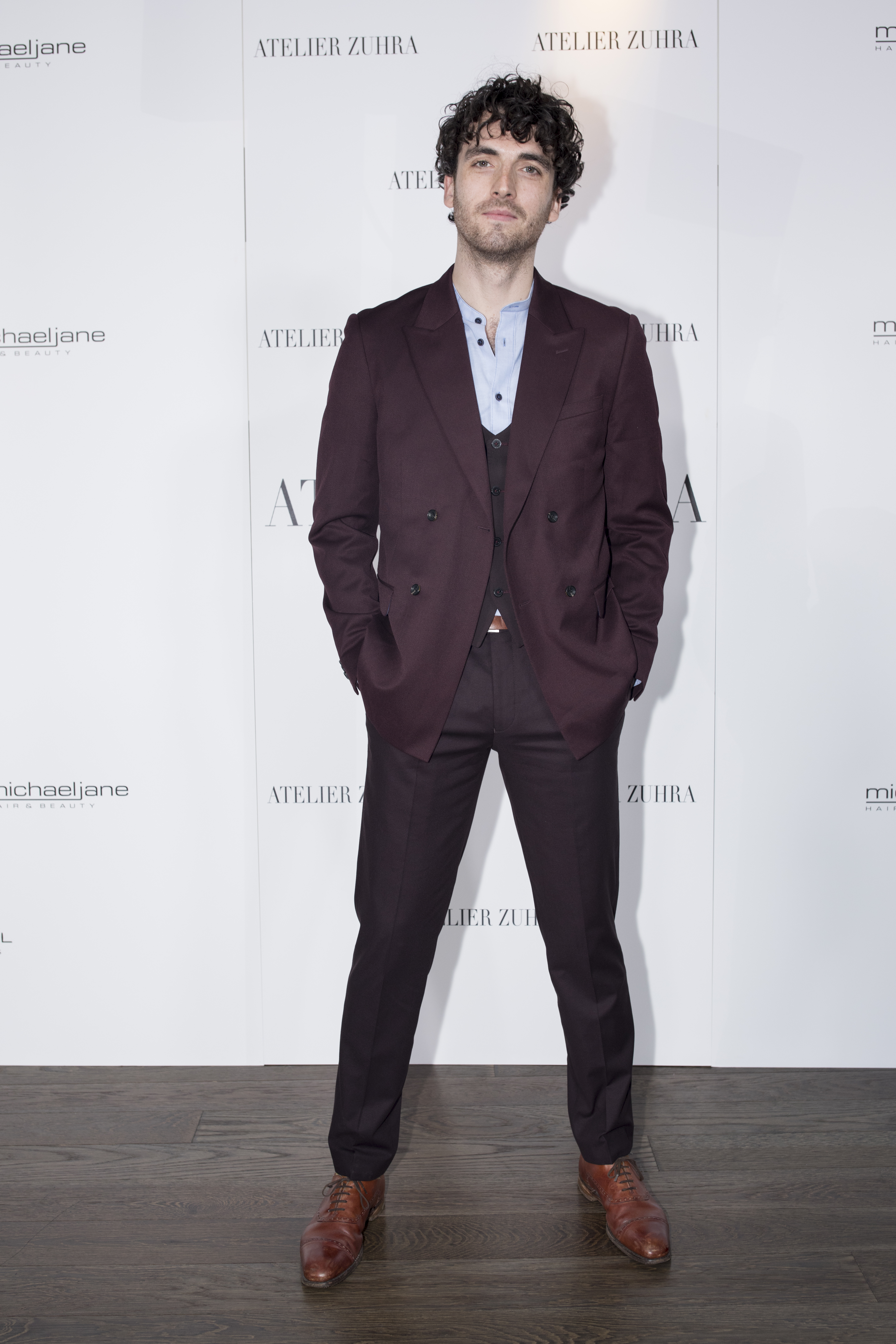
Arthur McBain at London Fashion Week

Arthur McBain is a British screen actor and children's author. He played Alex Myer in ITV's The Trouble with Maggie Cole and Snowy Fleet, in the ABC television series Friday On My Mind. His debut children's book In The Dead Of The Night was published by Little Hare books in 2019. Athur Mcbain has also released a single in his band Manaphant.

== Acting career ==
McBain trained at the Oxford School of Drama, graduating in 2013. He began his professional career in the Royal Shakespeare Company and National Theatre of Scotland's production of Dunsinane by David Greig. In 2017, McBain played Gordon 'Snowy' Fleet in ABC's television series Friday On My Mind, which tells the story of Australian rock band The Easybeats, before joining the cast of Rupert Goold's film Judy.

In 2019, McBain was cast as Alex Myer in ITV's The Trouble with Maggie Cole.

In 2023, McBain played Jean Gabriel Marchand in Ridley Scott's film Napoleon.

In October 2024, it was announced that McBain would be joining David Dawson and Ralph Little in a film adaptation of Antonis Samarakis' 1965 novel The Flaw.

== Books ==
Arthur McBain's first children's book, In The Dead Of The Night, Illustrated by Tom Knight, was released in 2019. His second book, Night of the Living Pasta, was released in 2023 and was illustrated by Chrissie Krebbs.

== Theatre ==
Year	Title	Role	Company	Director	Notes
2011	Dunsinane	George	National Theatre of Scotland / Royal Shakespeare Company	Roxana Silbert	play by David Greig

== Filmography ==
=== Film ===
Year	Title	Role	Director
2015	If I Told You the Truth	Kenny	Himself
2017	Blue Eyes	Gabriel	Neven Rufio
2019	Judy	Askith	Rupert Goold
2023	Napoleon	Jean Gabriel Marchand	Ridley Scott
2024	Deep Cover	Sam	Tom Kingsley
2025	Surviving Earth	Rowan	Thea Gajic
TBA	Aubergenfeld	Matt	John Jenkinson
TBA	The Flaw	TBA	Theophilos Papastylianos

=== Television ===
Year	Title	Role	Director
2017	Trust Me	Junior Doctor	Amy Neil
2017	Friday On My Mind	George "Snowy" Fleet	Matthew Saville
2020	The Trouble with Maggie Cole	Alex Myer	Ben Gregor
2023	Never Let Me Go	Blyth	Mark Munden
2024	After the Flood	Daniel Eden	Azhur Saleem
2024	Interview With The Vampire	Donny	Emma Freeman
