= Stigma (manga) =

Japanese manga series

- First tankōbon volume cover
- Genre: Adventure
- Manga
- Written by: Kazuya Minekura
- Published by: Shinshokan
- Imprint: Wings Comics
- Magazine: Wings
- Published: 2000
- Volumes: 1

Stigma is a Japanese manga series written and illustrated by Kazuya Minekura. It was serialized in Shinshokan's Wings magazine in 2000 and published in a single volume.

== Publication ==
Written and illustrated by Kazuya Minekura, the series was serialized in Shinshokan's Wings magazine in 2000. It was published in a single full color tankōbon volume on December 15, 2000.

== Drama CD ==
On April 28, 2001, a drama CD was released by Shinshokan.

== Reception ==
Brigitte Schoenhense of Splash Comics praised the mood of the story and the artwork's use of color. Manga Sanctuary praised the use of color to show dialog instead of speech bubbles. Mickaël Géreaume of Planete BD praised the artwork, though he felt the story was unoriginal and paced too slowly. Manga News felt it was presented more like a graphic novel than a manga. They praised the contrasting colors in the artwork and the characters. Jeanne of Aestheticism.com praised the manga as strange with a violent and alien story, along with some classic allegorical themes and full of love.
