= Chetna Pandya =

English actress

- Born: Chetna Kishorechandra Pandya; Brent, London, England
- Education: Mountview Academy of Theatre Arts
- Occupation: Actress
- Years active: 2004–present

Chetna Pandya is an English actress. She is known for her roles as Joyce in Channel 4's comedy series 'Feel Good' (2020) and Carol Tomlin in the ITV comedy-drama The Trouble with Maggie Cole (2020). She also played Coach Singh in the Netflix series Heartstopper (2022–2026).

== Early life ==
Pandya was born in the northwest London Borough of Brent from Indian immigrants. She graduated with a Bachelor of Arts in Performing Arts from the Mountview Academy of Theatre Arts in 2004.

== Filmography ==
Year	Title	Role	Notes
2004	Doctors	Nita Parish	Episode: "Old Wounds"
2005	New Tricks	Dipti Mayo	Episode: "Family Business"
2005	The Worst Week of My Life	Nurse Dar	Episode: "Friday"
2006	Green Wing	Nurse	Episode: #2.1
2007	Holby Blue	Amina Akram	Episode: #1.6
2010	Identity	Woman Doctor	Episode: "Second Life"
2011	Casualty	Rani Murad	Episodes: "Rogue" and "Keep on Running: Part 1"
2011	Black Mirror	Malaika	Episode: "The National Anthem"
2012	The Thick Of It	Journalist	Episode: #4.2
2013	Toast of London	Kate Khan	Episode: "The End"
2014	Line of Duty	New Jo	Episodes: #2.3 and 2.5
2014	The Wrong Mans	Nurse Harmon	Episode: "Action Mans"
2014	Doctors	Zainab Choudry	Episode: "Foreign Fields"
2015	Count Arthur Strong	Woman 3	Episode: "We're Listening"
2016	The Aliens	Chief	
2016	Motherland	Mrs. Lawson	Pilot
2016	Holby City	Ravinda Srinaath	Episode: "The Kill List"
2017	Doctors	Natalie Zafira	Episode: "Free Lunch"
2018	The A List	Liana Blackwood	
2018	Hounslow Diaries	Raheela	Pilot
2019	Cuckoo	Yusra Duncan	Episode: "Macbeth"
2019	This Way Up	Seema	Episode: #1.4
2020	Feel Good	Joyce	2 episodes
2020	The Trouble with Maggie Cole	Dr. Carol Tomlin	
2022–2024	Heartstopper	Coach Singh	Recurring role
2026	Heartstopper Forever	Coach Singh	Television film

== Stage ==
Year	Title	Role	Writer	Director	Venue
2012	Much Ado About Nothing	Margaret	William Shakespeare	Iqbal Khan	Courtyard Theatre, Stratford-upon-Avon
2017	Of Kith and Kin	Priya	Chris Thompson	Robert Hastie	Bush Theatre, London
