= The Trouble with Maggie Cole =

2020 comedy-drama TV series

- Genre: Comedy drama
- Written by: Mark Brotherhood
- Directed by: Ben Gregor
- Theme music composer: Jonathan Whitehead
- Country of origin: United Kingdom
- Original language: English
- No. of seasons: 1
- No. of episodes: 6

Production
- Executive producers: Sophie Clarke-Jervoise; Dawn French; Mark Brotherhood; Saskia Schuster
- Producers: Joanna Hanley; Angela Sinden
- Editors: Jono Griffith; Jonathan Lucas
- Running time: 60 minutes

Original release
- Network: ITV
- Release: 4 March – 8 April 2020

The Trouble with Maggie Cole is a British comedy-drama television series directed by Ben Gregor, and written by Mark Brotherhood. The show's first episode premiered on British television network ITV on 4 March 2020. It stars Dawn French in the role of Maggie Cole as well as Mark Heap, Julie Hesmondhalgh, Vicki Pepperdine, Patrick Robinson, Emily Reid and Gwyneth Keyworth.

== Premise ==
The six-part series takes place in the coastal village of Thurlbury and follows the local busybody Maggie Cole (Dawn French). Maggie refers to herself as the "local historian" and runs the local heritage/gift shop, while her husband Peter is the headmaster of the local primary school.

Self-important Maggie has spilt the beans, drunkenly, on local radio about six village characters with secrets, and is thus racked with guilt for her pointless gossip. But she somehow seems to have hit a seam of truth about at least two or three, and thus the stage is set for confrontations and reckonings.

== Production and filming ==
The show was initially planned to be named Glass Houses while in production in early 2019. Filming for the series took place across South Devon and Cornwall, primarily in the village of Noss Mayo. Other locations where filming took place are Mothecombe, Launceston Castle, Cargreen, Burgh Island, Bigbury-on-Sea beach, Morwellham Quay, Saltash, and a primary school in Ivybridge.

== Cast ==
- Dawn French as Maggie Cole
- Mark Heap as Peter Cole
- Julie Hesmondhalgh as Jill Wheadon
- Vicki Pepperdine as Karen Saxton
- Patrick Robinson as Marcus Ormansby
- Phil Dunster as Jamie Cole
- Gwyneth Keyworth as Becka Cole
- Chetna Pandya as Dr. Carol Tomlin
- Jamie Talbot as Tommy Jarvis
- Emily Reid as Roxanna Dubiki
- Rocco Padden as Josh Roberts
- Joe Layton as Neil Roberts
- Lee Boardman as Brian Daniels
- Hollie Edwin as Sydney Hurst
- Laurie Kynaston as Liam Myer
- Kerry Howard as Kelly Roberts
- Tomi May as Emil Dubiki
- Arthur McBain as Alex Myer
- Karen Henthorn as Jenny Myer
- Shane Attwooll as Patrick
- Ray Strasser-King as Phil

== Episodes ==
No. overall	No. in season	Title	Directed by	Written by	Original release date	Viewers (millions)
1	1	"Episode 1"	Ben Gregor	Mark Brotherhood	4 March 2020	N/A
Maggie Cole is flattered when a radio journalist interviews about the history of Thurlbury. In her excitement and with the help of a couple of gin and tonics, she shares gossip about some notable residents in the community...
2	2	"Episode 2"	Ben Gregor	Mark Brotherhood	11 March 2020	N/A
Maggie wants to apologise to everyone she's upset, whilst Peter attempts to hide the interview having gone viral. Jill bonds with fellow members of the "outed-six".
3	3	"Episode 3"	Ben Gregor	Mark Brotherhood	18 March 2020	N/A
Peter Cole is jittery about the press interest from Maggie's interview and the online petition calling for his resignation over the scandal.
4	4	"Episode 4"	Ben Gregor	Mark Brotherhood	25 March 2020	N/A
Peter has to contend with a campaign for his resignation and journalists are calling trying to dig up family skeletons...Fortunately, his ever dependable secretary is watching his back.
5	5	"Episode 5"	Ben Gregor	Mark Brotherhood	1 April 2020	N/A
Maggie is in need of some time alone so she heads to the pub to get a room and amend another 'radiogate' wrong. She learns the real story of landlord Brian, who is far from a 'gangster on-the-run'.
6	6	"Episode 6"	Ben Gregor	Mark Brotherhood	8 April 2020	N/A
It's the day of the village celebrations. Roxanna is still terrified by Alex's alarming behaviour and is desperate to get to him before he confronts the money lenders.
