= Friday on My Mind (miniseries) =

- Poster art
- Genre: Drama
- Written by: Christopher Lee
- Screenplay by: Christopher Lee
- Directed by: Matthew Saville
- Starring: Ashley Zukerman; Christian Byers; Will Rush; Arthur McBain; Mackenzie Fearnley; Du Toit Bredenkamp
- Country of origin: Australia
- Original language: English
- No. of episodes: 2

Production
- Cinematography: Simon Chapman
- Running time: 180 minutes
- Production company: Playmaker Media

Original release
- Network: ABC
- Release: 26 November – 3 December 2017

Friday On My Mind is an Australian television drama miniseries, based on the lives of Australian rock band The Easybeats, which first screened on the ABC in November 2017. The series is produced by Playmaker Media and was written by Christopher Lee and directed by Matthew Saville.

== Cast ==
- Ashley Zukerman as Ted Albert
- Christian Byers as Stevie Wright
- Will Rush as George Young
- Arthur McBain as Snowy Fleet
- Mackenzie Fearnley as Harry Vanda
- Du Toit Bredenkamp as Dick Diamonde
- Tiriel Mora as Lawyer
- Noel Hodda as Alexis Albert
- Ella Scott Lynch as Lillian Roxon

== Release ==
The mini series was broadcast on ABC1 on 26 November and 3 December 2017 over two nights. Episodes were later available for streaming on the ABC's iView service.

== Reception ==
Friday On My Mind received largely positive reviews from the press. Luke Buckmaster from The Guardian Australia praised it by saying: "Easybeats biopic plays like a concert you don't want to end". The acting in the series was praised, in particular Will Rush and Christian Byers. Although, overall the series was praised, critics did point out that the second episode wasn't as strong as the first.
