= Emilie Reid =

British actress

- Other name: Emily Reid
- Education: Juilliard School
- Years active: 2016–present

Emilie Reid is an English actress and musician. On television, she is known for her roles in the ITV series Belgravia (2020) and The Trouble with Maggie Cole (2020), as well as the Channel 5 series The Deceived (2020). She began releasing music in 2026.

== Early life and education ==
Reid attended Heathfield School, Ascot, finishing school in 2015. She went on to take a year-long course at the London Academy of Music and Dramatic Art (LAMDA). She earned a scholarship to the Juilliard School, going on to graduate in 2024.

== Career ==
In December 2016, Reid appeared in a production of In the Pink at the Courtyard Theatre in London. After making a guest appearance in an episode of Curfew, she landed her first major television roles in 2020, playing Sophia Trenchard and Roxana Dubiki in the period drama Belgravia and the comedy-drama The Trouble with Maggie Cole respectively, both on ITV, and starring in the lead role of Ophelia March in the Channel 5 mystery thriller The Deceived.

== Filmography ==
She has been credited as Emily Reid in all her on-screen performances so far.

| Year | Title | Role | Notes |
|---|---|---|---|
| 2017 | Aquilo | Millie | Short film |
| 2018 | Leprechaun Returns | Meredith | |
| 2019 | Curfew | Jessie Brown | Episode: #1.5 |
| 2020 | Belgravia | Sophia Trenchard | 3 episodes |
| 2020 | The Trouble with Maggie Cole | Roxanna Dubiki | 6 episodes |
| 2020 | The Deceived | Ophelia Marsh | Main role |
| 2021 | Copper & Nickel | Cora | Short film |

== Stage ==
| Year | Title | Role | Notes |
|---|---|---|---|
| 2016 | In the Pink | Dora | Courtyard Theatre, London |
