= Jack Bardoe =

British actor

- Born: Jack Bardoe; England
- Education: Royal Grammar School, Guildford
- Alma mater: Royal Academy of Dramatic Art
- Occupation: Actor
- Years active: 2019–present

Jack Bardoe is an English actor who played Charles Pope in the ITV drama series Belgravia (2020). He also voiced Lanz in the English dub of Xenoblade Chronicles 3.

== Education and training ==
Bardoe was a member of the National Youth Theatre, and undertook the Royal Academy of Dramatic Art (RADA) foundation course in acting from 2014 to 2015. He later enrolled in a degree programme at RADA, graduating in 2019. Bardoe also attended Royal Grammar School, Guildford.

== Filmography ==
=== Film ===
Year	Title	Role	Notes
2019	Twisted Tales of Love	Ash	

=== Television ===
Year	Title	Role	Notes
2020	Belgravia	Charles Pope	Miniseries, 5 episodes
2021	The Canterville Ghost	The Honorable Cecil Canterville	Episode: "Spring"
2022	Screw	Toby Phillips	

=== Theatre ===
Year	Title	Role	Venue
2017	Richard III	Gloucester	RADA, London
2018	The Philistines	Teterev	RADA, London
2018	The Last Days of Judas Iscariot	Saint Matthias, Sigmund Freud, Thomas the Apostle	RADA, London
2019	Woman and Scarecrow	Him	RADA, London
2019	A Midsummer Night's Dream	Thisbe	RADA, London
2019	Pride and Prejudice	Mr Bingley, Mr Collins	RADA, London
2019	Translations	Lieutenant Yolland	Royal National Theatre, London
2022	Othello	Roderigo	Royal National Theatre, London
2023	A Voyage Round My Father	John Mortimer	Theatre Royal, Bath
2024	Love's Labour's Lost	Don Armardo	Royal Shakespeare Theatre, Stratford-upon-Avon

=== Video games ===
Year	Title	Role	Notes
2022	Xenoblade Chronicles 3	Lanz	Voice role
