= Saiyuki Gaiden =

Japanese manga series

- Cover of the first tankōbon volume released by Ichijinsha, featuring Son Goku

最遊記外伝 (Saiyūki Gaiden)
- Genre: Adventure; Fantasy
- Manga
- Written by: Kazuya Minekura
- Published by: Square Enix (1999-2003); Ichijinsha (after 2003)
- Imprint: G Fantasy Comics; Zero Sum Comics
- Magazine: Monthly GFantasy (1999–2003); Monthly Comic Zero Sum (2003–2006); Comic Zero Sum WARD (2006–2009)
- Original run: May 1999 – May 16, 2009
- Volumes: 4
- Original video animation
- Directed by: Naoyuki Kuzuya
- Written by: Kazuya Minekura
- Music by: Hiroyuki Nagashima
- Studio: Anpro; Studio Izena
- Licensed by: NA: Sentai Filmworks
- Released: March 25, 2011 – April 26, 2013
- Runtime: 30 minutes per episode
- Episodes: 4

Saiyuki Gaiden (Japanese: 最遊記外伝, Hepburn: Saiyūki Gaiden) is a Japanese manga series that serves as a prequel to the Saiyuki series Kazuya Minekura wrote and illustrated. Saiyuki Gaiden began serialization in Square Enix's shōnen manga magazine Monthly GFantasy from May 1999 to February 2003 and continued serialization in Ichijinsha's josei manga magazine Monthly Comic Zero Sum from November 2003, and was then transferred to the publisher's shōjo manga Comic Zero Sum WARD. Serialization finished in May 2009, with its chapters collected in four tankōbon volumes. The manga tells a story that occurs 500 years before the main story.

Sentai Filmworks licensed a three-part original video animation (OVA) adaptation that aired from March to November 2011. A special edition titled Saiyuki Gaiden: Kouga no Shou was released in April 2013. Sentai Filmworks released in North America a "Complete Collection" Blu-ray edition that compiled the series into a two-hour feature-length motion picture in September 2022.

== Plot ==
Heaven, where the gods live, is a world where death does not exist. Konzen Douji spent his days bored but his life begins to change with the introduction of a golden-eyed boy at Kanzeon Bosatsu's side, who is said to have been born of a Lower World stone. Konzen is charged with looking after the boy and begins to sense a change in his life, although he is irritated at being toyed with. Konzen names the boy Goku. Goku becomes close to Tenpou Gensui and Kenren Taisho of Heaven's Western Army, and makes his first friend.

Goku is shocked when his friend dies and unleashes the power of the Seiten Taisei that is bound by his golden diadem, and with this overwhelming power, he massacres those in the area. Kanzeon Bosatsu knocks out the Seiten Taisei, but Konzen Douji stops her from finishing the job. Because they are protecting Goku, Konzen Douji, Kenren Taisho, and Tenpou Gensui are made enemies of heaven. They take hostage the Dragon King of the Western Ocean, Gojun, and attempt to flee to the Lower World.

== Media ==
=== Manga ===
Comic Zero Sum WARD No. 9 (May 2009) cover, the issue where Saiyuki Gaiden ended its serialization.

Saiyuki Gaiden, written and illustrated by Kazuya Minekura, first was serialized in Square Enix's shōnen manga magazine Monthly GFantasy. Its first installment started in the magazine's June 1999 issue, which was published in May, (Note: It started in the magazine's sixth issue of 1999 (cover date June 1),) and ran in the magazine until February 2003 issue. (Note: It ended in the magazine's second issue of 2003 (cover date March 1),) Due to the change of manga publisher, it continued serialization in Ichijinsha's josei manga magazine Monthly Comic Zero Sum from November 2003 issue. (Note: It started in the magazine's eleventh issue of 2003 (cover date November 1),) The manga was put on hold for one year in 2004, and was then transferred to the publisher's shōjo manga Comic Zero Sum WARD. The series finished its final installment in the July issue of Comic Zero Sum WARD, published on May 16, 2009. (Note: It ended in the magazine's ninth issue of 2009 (cover date), released on May 16 of that same year.) Ichijinsha collected its chapters in four tankōbon volumes, released from December 2005 to July 2009.

A special edition titled "Saiyuki Gaiden memorial" was released on July 16, 2009. On January 25, 2011, Ichijinsha published two new-edition volumes of Saiyuki Gaiden. In September 2012, a new, one-shot story titled Saiyuki Gaiden Heavenly Ants was released. Ichijinsha released a book titled Saiyuki Gaiden Anthology on July 31, 2017.

In Italy, the manga is licensed by Dynit; and Tong Li Publishing licensed the Chinese translation, which it published from July to October 2011. In April 2023, on the occasion of Saiyuki's 25th anniversary, a new design book box edition of Saiyuki Gaiden was published in Taiwan by Tong Li Publishing.

=== Anime ===
==== Production and release ====
Digipak art of the Blu-ray Box illustrated by Kazuya Minekura

In November 2009, it was announced an OVA titled Saiyuki Gaiden had been green-lit. The first of three volumes was released in Japan on March 25, 2011. The second of the three OVA volumes was released in Japan on June 24, 2011, and the third volume on September 22, 2011, after being delayed two months.

A special edition (4th episode) under the title Saiyuki Gaiden: Kouga no Shou (Note: Japanese: 最遊記外伝 特別編 香花の章, Hepburn: Saiyūki Gaiden: Tokubetsu-hen - Kōga no Shō), was released in Japan on April 26, 2013, Sentai Filmworks released a DVD called Saiyuki Gaiden Complete DVD containing OVA episodes 1–3 on January 22, 2013, and later a "Complete Collection" Blu-ray edition that compiled the series into a two-hour feature-length motion picture was released in North America on September 13, 2022. Section23 Films is the home-video distributor of Saiyuki Gaiden. On September 28, 2018, Frontier Works released all four OVA volumes of "Saiyuki Gaiden" in a Blu-ray box set containing a new, HD digital remastering of the show.

== Reception ==
=== Manga ===
The Saiyuki Gaiden manga remained in the top weekly Japanese ranking chart whenever a manga volume debuted. The fourth volume ranked fourth of the top-selling manga in Japan from July 27 to August 2, 2009, selling 89,565 copies and a total of 135,913 copies. and ranked twenty-second during August 3 to 9, 2009, selling 32,366 copies and a total of 167,971 copies. In addition to the volumes, a DVD box set titled The Monkey Perm 2 DVD-Box Deluxe Edition Gaiden ranked twelfth during the week of December 22 to 28, 2014, selling 1,653 copies. and The Monkey Perm 3 DVD-Box Deluxe Edition Gaiden ranked third during the week of February 1 to 7, 2016, selling 1,123 copies.

=== Anime ===
In his review of the anime DVD, Chris Beveridge of The Fandom Post describes the story as very simple and straightforward, saying Saiyuki Gaiden is a very entertaining miniseries that plays it seriously. He said there are moments of levity that fit the situation, calling the story enjoyable, and the animation and character design lovely. In his review of anime Blu-ray, Beveridge praised the OVA series, said the style used in the anime is relatively good, and stated "Saiyuki Gaiden fully reveals the events that took place in Heaven, which in turn created bonds that eventually shook its pillars so strongly"; he also compares the moments of the anime to a lightness and softness that fits with the situation.
