= Belgravia (TV series) =

British television series

- Title card
- Genre: Historical drama
- Based on: Belgravia by Julian Fellowes
- Written by: Julian Fellowes
- Directed by: John Alexander
- Composer: John Lunn
- Countries of origin: United Kingdom; United States
- Original language: English
- No. of series: 1
- No. of episodes: 6

Production
- Executive producers: Gareth Neame; Nigel Marchant; Liz Trubridge; Vrushank Velhankar
- Producer: Colin Wratten
- Running time: Approx. 45 mins
- Production company: Carnival Films

Original release
- Network: ITV
- Release: 15 March – 19 April 2020
- Network: Epix
- Release: 12 April 2020

Related
- Belgravia: The Next Chapter

Belgravia is a British historical drama television series, set in the 19th century, based on the 2016 novel of the same name by Julian Fellowes—both named after Belgravia, an affluent district of London. The limited series, a co-production between Carnival Films and American cable network Epix, was adapted by Fellowes from his novel, and reunited the production team behind Downton Abbey, with Gareth Neame and Nigel Marchant executive-producing alongside Liz Trubridge and Fellowes. Belgravia was directed by John Alexander and produced by Colin Wratten.

The series premiered in the UK on ITV on 15 March 2020 and in the US on Epix on 12 April 2020. A follow-up series, Belgravia: The Next Chapter, written and developed by Helen Edmundson, was announced in September 2022, and premiered in January 2024.

== Premise ==
Belgravia begins at the Duchess of Richmond's ball (an actual event held on the night of 15/16 June 1815), which was held in Brussels for the Duke of Wellington on the eve of the Battle of Quatre Bras, two days before the Battle of Waterloo. Among the guests are James and Anne Trenchard, who are living on the profits of newfound trading success. Their young daughter Sophia has caught the eye of Edmund Bellasis, the son and heir of one of the richest and most prominent families in England. Twenty-six years later in 1841, when the two families are settled into the newly developed area of Belgravia, the events of the ball, and the secrets, still resonate.

== Cast ==
The Trenchard family

- Philip Glenister as James Trenchard
- Tamsin Greig as Anne Trenchard
- Richard Goulding as Oliver Trenchard, son of James and Anne
- Emily Reid as Sophia Trenchard, daughter of James and Anne
- Alice Eve as Susan Trenchard, wife of Oliver

The Trenchard servants

- Paul Ritter as Turton, butler to the Trenchards
- Saskia Reeves as Ellis, lady's maid to Anne Trenchard
- Bronagh Gallagher as Speer, lady's maid to Susan Trenchard

The Bellasis family

- Tom Wilkinson as Peregrine Bellasis, Earl of Brockenhurst
- Harriet Walter as Caroline Bellasis, Countess of Brockenhurst
- Jeremy Neumark Jones as Edmund, Viscount Bellasis, only son of the Earl and Countess of Brockenhurst and heir apparent to the title
- James Fleet as Reverend Stephen Bellasis, younger brother of the Earl of Brockenhurst.
- Diana Hardcastle as Grace Bellasis, wife of Stephen Bellasis
- Adam James as John Bellasis, son of Stephen Bellasis and Grace Bellasis and heir to his father

The Grey family

- Tara Fitzgerald as Corinne Grey, Dowager Countess of Templemore
- Ella Purnell as Lady Maria Grey, daughter of the Dowager Countess of Templemore

The Pope family

- Serena Evans as Mrs Pope, foster mother to Charles Pope
- Jack Bardoe as Charles Pope, raised as no one special but in reality grandson of James Trenchard and Peregrine Bellasis, and thereby, heir to the Earl of Brockenhurst

Characters at the Duchess of Richmond's ball

- Nicholas Rowe as Arthur Wellesley, Duke of Wellington
- James Chalmers as Sir William Ponsonby
- Gunnar de Jong as the Prince of Orange
- Diana Kent as the Duchess of Richmond
- Robert Portal as the Duke of Richmond

Miscellaneous

- Naomi Frederick as the Duchess of Bedford
- Penny Layden as Mrs Babbage
- Jack Shalloo as Morris
- Nigel Allen as Robert
- Stevee Davies as Brodsworth

== Episodes ==
No.	Title	Directed by	Written by	Original release date	UK viewers (millions)
1	"Episode 1"	John Alexander	Julian Fellowes	15 March 2020	6.57
James Trenchard, a successful businessman is known as "The Magician" for having supplied the military with food and supplies on the eve of the Battle of Quatre Bras. He uses his daughter Sophia's friendship with Lord Bellasis to gain favour, and he agrees to their marriage. Sophia thinks the marriage ceremony was a sham after discovering the priest who married them is currently a fellow soldier. Edmund is killed on the battlefield, leaving Sophia believing she has been left unmarried and pregnant. She dies during childbirth, leaving a son. Twenty-six years later the Trenchards move to the newly built Belgravia, where they become neighbours to the Brockenhursts, who have no knowledge of their grandson.
2	"Episode 2"	John Alexander	Julian Fellowes	22 March 2020	6.40
Anne Trenchard decides, against her husband's wishes, to confide the secret of a grandson, Charles Pope, to Lady Brockenhurst, who refuses to believe her son would contrive such a deceit. Lady Brockenhurst, whose husband bemoans the fact they have no heir, arranges an after dinner party to which she invites Charles Pope, who has no idea of his birth parents. The Trenchards, including their son Oliver and his wife Susan, are also invited. Further guests at the party are Lady Brockenhurst's nephew John Bellasis, the heir presumptive, and Lady Maria Grey, who is expected to marry him. When Charles Pope arrives, Lady Brockenhurst introduces him and discovers James Trenchard had invested in Pope's business as a cotton trader, much to Anne Trenchard's astonishment. John Bellasis takes a fancy to Susan, while Pope discovers that Lady Maria is knowledgeable about the cotton trade.
3	"Episode 3"	John Alexander	Julian Fellowes	29 March 2020	6.13
Lady Brockenhurst's introduction of Charles Pope to society raises the interest of Lady Brockenhurst's brother-in-law Reverend Stephen Bellasis who has gambling debts of £1000 which his brother, the Earl, refuses to pay. Lady Maria Grey also takes an interest, as does her betrothed John Bellasis, Stephen's son, who begins an affair with Susan Trenchard which she relies on her maid Speer to keep secret. Susan's husband Oliver is also curious to know why his father, James Trenchard, has invested in Charles's company. John Bellasis decides to enlist the aid of the Trenchards' servants Ellis and Turton in uncovering the family secrets.
4	"Episode 4"	John Alexander	Julian Fellowes	5 April 2020	5.71
Lady Maria Grey joins Lady Brockenhurst on her visit to the offices of Charles Pope. Anne Trenchard asks to accompany them. John Bellasis finds out about the visit from the Trenchards' servants and turns up unannounced. Still unable to find a connection, Bellasis asks his lover Susan to accompany her husband Oliver and his parents to their country house to glean more information. Lady Maria sees Charles Pope secretly and they realise they have mutual feelings. Reverend Bellasis is given money by his brother towards his gambling debts, while John Bellasis, needing money to pay his spies, steals the last of the family silver his mother had hidden. Lady Templemore pressures her daughter, Lady Maria, to marry John and is horrified to find she does not wish to. Susan Trenchard is shocked to find out she is pregnant.
5	"Episode 5"	John Alexander	Julian Fellowes	12 April 2020	5.77
John Bellasis discovers from Turton that James Trenchard had been in contact with Charles Pope's foster parents for years. Lady Maria Grey informs Lady Brockenhurst and Anne Trenchard she will not be marrying John Bellasis despite her mother's announcement in The Times newspaper. Oliver Trenchard travels to Pope's cotton mill in Manchester and is told Pope obtained the mill by underhand means and has been cheating Customs and Excise. Charles does not deny the allegation when confronted by James Trenchard, who decides to travel north to investigate for himself. Following these accusations, Lady Brockenhurst resolves to reveal Charles's true parentage. Charles Pope refuses to elope with Lady Maria with the allegations hanging over him. Sophia's letters and marriage certificate are given to Anne Trenchard by a former maid and friend of Sophia. When hearing about these documents, John Bellasis realises the implications to his inheritance, further compounded when he discovers Sophia's marriage to Lord Bellasis was legally valid.
6	"Episode 6"	John Alexander	Julian Fellowes	19 April 2020	5.72
James Trenchard travels to Manchester and discovers the allegations against Charles Pope are false. Susan Trenchard tells John Bellasis she is pregnant but he refuses to marry her as she would be a divorced woman and the daughter-in-law of a tradesman. Ellis's deceit is uncovered and she implicates Turton and John Bellasis. Susan persuades Oliver to accept the baby as his son and heir as James and Anne are to give them their country estate. Pope is lured to a night-time rendezvous at the river by John Bellasis, who intends to regain his inheritance by killing him. James and Oliver Trenchard come to his rescue and Oliver becomes an unlikely hero saving his father and Pope from drowning. John Bellasis flees to Europe and Charles Pope is acknowledged as Viscount Bellasis. Lady Templemore's objections to her daughter, Lady Maria, marrying Charles Pope are overcome.

== Production ==
=== Development ===
On 14 January 2019, it was announced that ITV had given a series order consisting of six episodes to a television adaptation of Julian Fellowes' 2016 novel Belgravia. The series was expected to be written by Fellowes and directed by John Alexander. Executive producers were set to include Gareth Neame, Nigel Marchant, and Liz Trubridge with Colin Wratten serving as a producer. Production companies involved with the series were slated to consist of Carnival Films. On 8 February 2019, it was reported that American premium cable network Epix had joined the production as a co-producer.

=== Filming ===
Principal photography took place in the summer of 2019. Many of the exteriors were shot in Edinburgh, with parts of the New Town standing in for Belgravia. Other locations included Edinburgh City Chambers and Hopetoun House.

The scenes that take place in Brussels were filmed at Hopetoun House in West Lothian, Wrest Park in Bedfordshire (chapel scenes) and the Bath Assembly Hall (ballroom scenes). The exterior of the Trenchard townhouse were filmed on Moray Place, in Edinburgh; most of the interiors were filmed at a mansion in Berwickshire, and also at a mansion in Basildon Park and Syon House in London. Some scenes take place at the Duchess of Bedford’s London townhouse; those were filmed in West Wycombe House in Buckinghamshire. Anne Trenchard's manor house is fictional, so filming was done at the manor house Loseley Park, in Guildford.

The production visited The Historic Chatham Dockyard and filmed on Anchor Wharf quayside, the Tarred Yarn Store as Pimm’s Chop House and the streets around the Ropery to stand in for both a London market and the streets around Girton’s Mill. Other shooting locations included the gardens at Hampton Court Palace, the Athenaeum Club in London, and Quarry Bank Mill in Cheshire.

== Reception ==
The review aggregator website Rotten Tomatoes reported a 75% approval rating based on 36 critic reviews. The website's critics consensus reads, "Delightfully soapy, if the slightest bit silly, Belgravia will satiate fans looking for a new period melodrama to sip their tea to." Metacritic gave the series a weighted average score of 70 out of 100 based on 15 critics, indicating "generally favorable" reviews.
