= Kazuya Minekura =

Japanese manga artist (born 1975)

- Born: Hitomi A. March 23, 1975 (age 51); Kanagawa Prefecture, Japan
- Occupation: Manga artist
- Known for: Saiyuki
- Website: nitroblog.exblog.jp

Kazuya Minekura (Japanese: 峰倉かずや, Hepburn: Minekura Kazuya; born March 23, 1975) is a Japanese manga artist, known for the Saiyuki series.

== Biography ==
Kazuya Minekura was born in Kanagawa Prefecture and still resides there. Her other manga series include Wild Adapter, Shiritsu Araiso Koto Gakko Seitokai Shikkobu (Araiso Private School Student Council Executive Committee), and Stigma. Stigma is notable for being a full-color work, unusual as manga is generally drawn in black and white. Minekura portrays herself as a naked chibi character with brown hair, in the Artist's Talk section of her manga. She had an illness that affected her writing from 2004 to 2007, which caused her to have a hysterectomy. On September 28, 2010, she went on hiatus to undergo surgery for ameloblastoma on the right half of her upper jawbone. On December 31, 2010, she reported the surgery successfully removed the tumor and is currently resting and being fitted with artificial prosthetics to reconstruct the area where her bones were removed. She resumed her manga Wild Adapter in 2015. On April 16, 2021, Minekura revealed that she had been diagnosed with spinal canal stenosis. Minekura also said that she had also been suffering from multiple medical problems.

Before becoming a professional she created doujinshi (self-published print works). Everything that she created from her time as a doujinshi artist was converted into the major works that she is known for today. She wrote the scripts for the drama CDs produced of her works, and wrote the lyrics for the opening theme in Saiyuki Reload Burial.

Her works fall into the fantasy, school life, and "hard-boiled" genres. Most of her works involve action. She has a fixation with the depiction of the male body and friendships. As a lover of smoking, many of the characters that appear in her works are smokers (she herself smokes Cabin Super Mild). Her works involve a lot of violence and grotesque scenes. Her characters also use dirty jokes often. She uses a lot of shadow screen tones; one example is the hard-boiled series Bus Gamer. She uses Copic markers when coloring, but in recent years has been using CG as well.

== Selected works ==
- Saiyuki
- Saiyuki Reload
- Saiyuki Reload Blast
- Saiyuki Gaiden
- Saiyuki Ibun
- Wild Adapter
- Just!
- Stigma
- Brother
- Diorama
- Bus Gamer
- Shiritsu Araiso Koto Gakko Seitokai Shikkobu (Araiso Private High School Student Council Executive Committee)
- Hachi no Su (蜂の巣, Honeycomb)
- HARD LUCK (cover art)

=== Art books ===
- Back gammon 1～3
- Back gammon-Remix
- sugar coat
- salty dog 1～10
- sugar coat excess
