= Wild Adapter =

Japanese manga series

- Cover of Wild Adapter volume 1 as published by Tokuma Shoten

ワイルドアダプター (Wairudo Adaputā)
- Genre: Action, Mystery, Film Noir
- Manga

Araiso Private School Student Council Executive Committee
- Written by: Kazuya Minekura
- Published by: Tokuma Shoten
- Original run: 1999 – present
- Manga
- Written by: Kazuya Minekura
- Published by: Tokuma Shoten (before 2011); Ichijinsha (after 2011)
- English publisher: NA: Tokyopop; SG: Chuang Yi Comics
- Magazine: Chara (2001–2007); Comic Zero Sum Ward (2011–2015)
- Original run: 2001 – present
- Volumes: 7
- Original video animation

Araiso Private School Student Council Executive Committee
- Directed by: Shinji Satoh
- Studio: Nippon Animation
- Released: March 29, 2002 – July 26, 2002
- Episodes: 2
- Original video animation
- Directed by: Naoyuki Kuzuya
- Music by: Kenji Fujisawa
- Studio: Anpro
- Released: March 26, 2014 – September 30, 2015
- Episodes: 2
- icon

Wild Adapter (Japanese: ワイルドアダプター, Hepburn: Wairudo Adaputā) is a Japanese manga series by Kazuya Minekura set in Tokyo and Yokohama, Japan in the mid-1990s. There is also an alternate universe dōjinshi and two episode OVA called Shiritsu Araiso Koto Gakko Seitokai Shikkobu (私立荒磯高等学校生徒会執行部 Araiso Private School Student Council Executive Committee). Wild Adapter was also adapted as a two episode OVA in 2014, which is set in the universe of the manga series.

== Overview ==
Although originally serialized in a boy's love anthology magazine, the content of the manga mixes seinen action and mystery with shōnen-ai themes and thus does not fall clearly into either category. The volumes are stand alones, each with its own storyline and theme that fit into the broader arc of the general plot, which has Kubota and Tokito, the main characters, investigating a mysterious drug, 'W·A', and finding out about Tokito's past before his amnesia. As such, the overall series is largely character-driven, rather than action-driven, and other events and issues are shown as part of the lives of the main characters. The storytelling is done through a different side character for each volume, and the author has described the series as "the lives of the protagonists as seen, and described by an onlooker". There is plenty of violence and bloodshed in the manga, which also deals with serious issues, and a theme for each volume, such as the cult of religion, the power of words, the struggle for survival. The yakuza underworld serves as a setting for the series, but it is not the main focal point. Rather, it is the interactions between the two protagonists, and the exploration of their characters.

The artstyle of the manga is stark black and white with clean sharp lines, and there is less shading or grey tones. Keeping in line with Minekura's style the characters are highly detailed, with emphasis on facial features, especially the hair, and anatomically accurate bodies. The backgrounds are also highly detailed and portray the Tokyo urban landscape very realistically. A unique feature of the manga has all the pages and spaces outside the panels coloured black, a technique usually used in manga only to reflect a past event or a flashback.

This work was originally serialized in Japan in Chara magazine, starting from 2001, and was published by Tokuma Shoten. Since 2011, it is published by Zero Sum Ward of Ichijinsha. The manga was put on hiatus in 2015 due to Minekura's health. In July 2025, Ichijinsha announced that the manga would return to serialisation on the Ichijin Plus website on August 8.

The series is licensed in North America by Tokyopop, the first volume of which was published in January 2007. There are 6 volumes which were originally published between 2001 and 2008. The series is also published in English by Chuang Yi, in German by Carlsen Comics and is published in East Asia.

== Story ==
"W·A," later identified as "Wild Adapter," is the name of a dangerous drug which transforms its users into an animalistic state; the users exhibit superhuman strength and a berserker mentality until the drug causes his or her organs to explode, effectively killing them. The corpses left behind by W·A are covered in fur and sport cat-like claws. The police are baffled by W•A even as they investigate the remains of W·A users, and the Yakuza wants it. Two powerful rival yakuza groups, the Izumokai and the Toujougumi are fighting to figure out and gain control of the source of W·A, a task made harder by the fact that no user of W·A has managed to stay alive after consuming the drug.

Amid this, 17-year-old Kubota, the first of two main protagonists, has somehow managed to stumble into the position of Head of the Izumokai youth group, despite not being a gang member before that. He is aided by the second-in-command, Komiya, in his yakuza jobs and it is through Komiya that he knows of the existence of W·A. Komiya is killed by the rival Toujougumi gang when investigating W·A, and Kubota quits the gang after Komiya's death, but not before taking out twelve high-ranking members of the Toujougumi gang, and disappears from the yakuza world.

Soon after, Kubota picks up a stranger with amnesia whom he names Tokito, and they start living together. Tokito has no idea of his identity, or why his right hand is a furry, clawed paw identical to the animalistic bodies of dead W·A users, yet he is still alive. Kubota and Tokito then set out on a mission to investigate W·A, hoping to discover Tokito's past at the same time. The manga details their quest to investigate every victim of W·A, and following up on any leads provided by Kou, a drugstore owner who is Kubota's current employer, or Kasai, Kubota's detective uncle. These tips however are usually red herrings or traps and lead nowhere.

In the process, Kubota and Tokito often get mixed up with the yakuza who are just as eager to seek W·A. Sanada, leader of Izumokai gang and Kubota's former employer is fascinated by Kubota, and constantly keeps tabs on him. Sekiya, leader of Toujougumi, just wants to get his hands on W·A. In their various clashes with the yakuza, Kubota and Tokito rarely emerge unscathed, but they always manage to survive and make it out somehow, ready to follow the next lead.

== Characters ==
Kubota Makoto

In volume one of Wild Adapter, Kubota is 16. He becomes leader of the Yakuza's Izumokai youth division when he is offered two guns; one of them is dangerously defective and the other is safe and functional. He chooses the functional gun and executes the youth division's previous leader who was revealed to be a spy from the rival Yakuza. Kubota leaves the Izumokai after only seven months, and a year later, re-emerges as Tokito's protector.

He is seen as calm, collected, and focused, as well as cool, callous, and aloof. He is cruel and insensitive, but at the same time, childish and sweet. To both friends and enemies, they find him terrifying at times—whether because he can insensitively break a man's arm, or because of his smile. He is never seen without a cigarette, and his favored brand is Seven Stars.

Komiya, in volume 1, says he has no logic to him. He says, "Interested in nothing, yet fiercely curious about everything. Acts like he doesn't care, but with so much desire in his eyes. Only caring for himself, but completely masochistic. Needing nothing, clinging to everything. Chaos existing inside tight order...All of these fevered colors merging into black...and disappearing. He's just like this city."

Kubota is extremely possessive of Tokito, and is a very talented mahjong player.

- voiced by Toshiyuki Morikawa on drama CDs and in the Executive Committee OVA

Tokito Minoru

Tokito is first introduced as a boy running from pursuers. He collapses, unconscious, in an alley, where Kubota finds him soon after leaving the Izumokai. Tokito's right hand is that of a beast's—and that of deceased W·A users—and it occasionally causes him immense pain. He keeps it covered by a black glove. He has no memory of his past before Kubota picked him up, other than flashes of a menacing figure who calls him "Minoru." Tokito is loud, impulsive, stubborn, and tactless at times, but he is straightforward, kind-hearted, and a very loyal ally.

Kubota, along with several other characters, refers to Tokito as a "cat," or "stray cat." Tokito calls Kubota "Kubo-chan." Tokito is highly protective of Kubota, and gets jealous easily when he thinks someone else is closer to Kubota.

- voiced by Hideo Ishikawa on drama CDs and in the Executive Committee OVA

=== Yakuza ===
==== Izumokai ====
- Sanada is the daikou, or leader, of the Izumokai. He takes a special interest in Kubota when he becomes leader of the Youth Division. He has a vicious dog named Ark—named for his favorite brand of cigarettes, Ark Royal Vanilla. After Kubota leaves the Izumokai, Sanada follows him around.
- Komiya Nobuo is the second-in-command in the Izumokai Youth Division. He is doubtful of Kubota when he first takes up the leader position, but over the course of the first volume, develops feelings for him. Komiya's mother is a drug-using prostitute who is almost killed at the hands of a W·A user. Komiya is killed at the end of the first volume when he obtains a sample of W·A for Kubota. Komiya's death is the reason why Kubota leaves the Izumokai.
- Osamu is the man who takes Kubota's place as the leader of the Izumokai Youth Division. He is introduced at the end of volume 4 as a cold, ruthless man willing to do anything to climb up the yakuza ranks. In volume 6, he is responsible for abducting Tokito to the Izumokai's off-shore oil tanker.
- Ryuunosuke/Tatchan is Osamu's second-in-command and childhood friend. He is more compassionate and friendly than Osamu.

==== Toujougumi ====
• Sekiya Jun is the leader of the Toujougumi Youth Division, and becomes the daikou when Kubota kills the previous leader as his condition of leaving the Izumokai at the end of volume 1. In his one major confrontation with Kubota and Tokito in volume 2, Sekiya tells them that he knows about W·A, at least, and makes it clear that he suspects Tokito is also involved. He acts suggestively toward Tokito and has a stereotypically homosexual attitude; he speaks with a lisp and refers to himself with the feminine "atashi" (rather than the more masculine "ore," "jibun," or "boku"). Saori calls him an "okama"—an offensive term for a homosexual man.

- voiced by Shin-ichiro Miki on drama CDs

=== Police ===
- Kasai is Kubota's uncle and a detective. He gives Kubota information regarding W·A and helps him out in various ways, like letting Kubota off the hook when he turns up at the scenes of assorted murders or gang turf-wars. He is very concerned about his nephew, but his advice does not always get across to Kubota.
- Araki is Kasai's rookie detective. He accompanies Kasai to crime scenes and is infamous for his weak stomach around W·A scenes.
- Hasebe is another detective who detains Kubota on suspicion of murder in volume 4.

=== Friends ===
- Kou manages a small shop in the Chinese area of Yokohama. He acts as Tokito's doctor ("veterinarian"), despite the fact that he is unlicensed. Tokito resents him and calls him various things like, "quack" or "unlicensed bastard." Kou sells various questionable odd and ends in his shop, including weapons and drugs and is good at getting information. He employs Kubota for odd jobs like deliveries.
- voiced by Toshihiko Seki on drama CDs
- Ookuba Saori is a girl who runs into Kubota and Tokito; volume 2 details her interaction with them, and is most likely her sole appearance in the story as a whole. Saori is a pregnant girl who runs away from home, intending to find her boyfriend. She encounters Kubota when she's trying to shoplift from a convenience store, and later becomes more involved with Kubota and Tokito when she discovers that her boyfriend is dead as an effect of W·A. It is strongly implied at the end of the volume that she has an abortion.
- Takizawa Ryouji is a reporter who encounters Kubota and Tokito in volume 3 and becomes quite fond of them. He joins Kubota and Tokito in investigating a religious cult called "Kaikou no Kiba"—"Fang of Fortune"—and its possible connections to W·A. Takizawa becomes a freelance reporter in volume 4.
- Anna is an old friend of Kubota's who works as a prostitute. She asks for Kubota's help in volume 4, but ends up generally making Tokito jealous and uneasy. She knew Kubota when he was 15 and took his virginity.
- Shouta is a young neighbor of Kubota and Tokito's. He lived in the next-door apartment when Kubota first brought Tokito home, and was instrumental in socializing Tokito. He moved away before the events of volume 2, but his character is not revealed until volume 5.

== Executive committee ==
Wild Adapter's characters first made their debut in one of Minekura's earlier works, a dōjinshi titled Araiso Private High School Student Council Executive Committee. In Executive Committee, Kubota and Tokito are high school students who are on the executive committee, a kind of juvenile police force. The stories in Executive Committee are largely silly and plotless, such as resolving mysteries over a cheat-sheet for an exam, or acting as bodyguards for a spoiled teen idol.

Executive Committee is also a two-episode OVA.
