= Akira Ishida =

Japanese voice actor

- 石田 彰
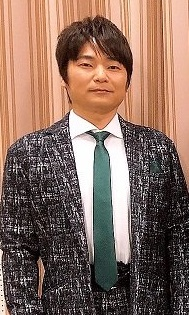
- Ishida in 2020
- Born: November 2, 1967 (age 59); Nisshin, Aichi, Japan
- Education: Nihon University
- Occupations: Actor; voice actor
- Years active: 1990–present
- Agent: Peerless Gerbera

Akira Ishida (石田 彰, Ishida Akira; born November 2, 1967) is a Japanese actor who specializes in voice acting.

For his portrayal of Setsuna Aoki in Sakura Wars, and Athrun Zala in Mobile Suit Gundam SEED, Mobile Suit Gundam SEED Destiny and Mobile Suit Gundam SEED Freedom and Masahiro Sanada in Tenjō Tenge, he was chosen as the most popular voice actor in the Animage Anime Grand Prix in 2004, and won the Best Supporting Character (male) award at the 1st Seiyu Awards in 2007. He is best known for his roles as Akaza in Demon Slayer: Kimetsu no Yaiba, Gaara in Naruto, Zeref in Fairy Tail, Cho Hakkai in Saiyuki, Kaworu Nagisa in Neon Genesis Evangelion, Makoto Yuki in Persona 3, Byakuya Togami in Danganronpa, Kuja in Final Fantasy, Otto Apocalypse in Honkai Impact 3rd, Luocha in Honkai: Star Rail, Kamisato Ayato in Genshin Impact, Katsura Kotarou in Gintama & Eishi Tsukasa in Food Wars Shokugeki no Sōma.

== Filmography ==
=== Animation ===
List of voice performances in animation
| Year | Series | Role | Notes | Source |
|---|---|---|---|---|
| 1989 | Mobile Police Patlabor | Mechanical Man | | |
| 1990 | The Three-Eyed One | Takashi | | |
| 1991 | Ranma ½ | Yudono Yutaro | Season 6 - Ep. 99 | |
| 1991–1992 | Magical Princess Minky Momo: Hold on to Your Dreams | Joe | | |
| 1992 | Thumbelina: A Magical Story | Prince | | |
| 1990 | Kobo-chan | Tsuruta | | |
| 1992 | Legend of Galactic Heroes: Golden Wings | Additional voices | | |
| 1993 | Please Save My Earth | Laszo | | |
| 1994 | YuYu Hakusho | Shinobu Sensui (young) | | |
| 1994 | Marmalade Boy | Kei Tsuchiya | | |
| 1994 | Chō Kuse ni Narisō | Kamioka Ryuu | | |
| 1994 | Yamato Takeru | Amatsumi | | |
| 1994 | Combustible Campus Guardress | Jinno Takumi | | |
| 1994–1995 | Tonde Burin | Koichi Mizuno | | |
| 1994–1997 | You're Under Arrest | Saki Abdusha | OAV and TV | |
| 1994 | Captain Tsubasa J | Misaki Taro (adult) | | |
| 1994–1995 | My Sexual Harassment | Young boy | | |
| 1995 | Ninku | Sekirai Ninku | | |
| 1995 | Sailor Moon SuperS | Fisheye | | |
| 1995 | Jura Tripper | Mint | | |
| 1995 | Soar High! Isami | Idol | | |
| 1995 | Nurse Angel Ririka SOS | Seiya Uzaki, Herb | | |
| 1995 | Level C | Mizuki Shinohara | | |
| 1995 | Neon Genesis Evangelion | Kaworu Nagisa | | |
| 1995 | Tōma Kishinden ONI | Shuramaru | | |
| 1995 | Fire Emblem | Gordon | | |
| 1996 | Case Closed | Saguru Hakuba & Various characters | | |
| 1996–2009 | Slayers series | Xellos | | |
| 1996 | Slayers Special | Jeffrey | | |
| 1997 | Bakusou Kyoudai Let's & Go WGP | Schmidt | | |
| 1997 | Hen | Hiroyuki | | |
| 1997 | The Kindaichi Case Files | Shin'ichi Ukon | | |
| 1997 | Clamp School Detectives | Itomu Yuudaiji | | |
| 1997 | Fushigi Yûgi OVA 2 | Ren Shigyō | | |
| 1997 | Shinkai Densetsu Meremanoid | Leon | | |
| 1997 | Berserk | Judeau | | |
| 1997 | Voogie's Angel | Ash | | |
| 1997 | Dragoon | Sedi | OAV | |
| 1998 | Outlaw Star | Yase | | |
| 1998 | LET'S ぬぷぬぷっ | Oomori Ani | | |
| 1998 | Maico 2010 | Akira Tenpoin | | |
| 1998 | Legend of Basara | Tatara | | |
| 1998 | Sentimental Journey | Masahiro Yamamoto | Ep. 7 | |
| 1998 | Nightwalker: The Midnight Detective | Shunichi | | |
| 1998–1999 | Master Keaton | Matsui Hiroshi | | |
| 1998 | Kare Kano | Kazuma Ikeda | | |
| 1998 | Touch: Miss Lonely Yesterday | Sasaki | | |
| 1999 | Digimon Adventure | Wizardmon | | |
| 1999 | Gokudo | Gokudo | Also known as Jester | |
| 1999 | I'm Gonna Be An Angel! | Michael | | |
| 1999 | Saiyuki Premium | Cho Hakkai | OAV | |
| 1999 | Soul Hunter | Shinkohyo | | |
| 1999 | Jibaku-kun | Baku (Bucky) | | |
| 1999 | Seraphim Call | Narration | Ep. 10 | |
| 1999–2000 | Gundress | Saiki Ryo | | |
| 2000 | Pilot Candidate | Yu | | |
| 2000 | Gensomaden Saiyuki | Cho Hakkai | | |
| 2000 | Sakura Wars | Setsuna Aoki | TV series | |
| 2000 | Boys Be... | Makoto Kurumizawa | | |
| 2001 | Tales of Eternia: The Animation | Reid Hershel | | |
| 2000 | Pokémon: The Johto Journeys | Falkner | | |
| 2001–2003 | Cyborg 009 | Apollo | | |
| 2000 | Inuyasha | Amari Nobunaga | | |
| 2001 | Haré+Guu | Seiichi Tachibana | | |
| 2001 | Final Fantasy: Unlimited | Makenshi | | |
| 2001 | Captain Tsubasa: Road to 2002 | Hikaru Matsuyama | | |
| 2001 | The Prince of Tennis | Hajime Mizuki | | |
| 2001 | Kogepan | Cream Bread | | |
| 2002 | Tokyo Mew Mew | Shunsuke | Ep. 30 | |
| 2002 | The Twelve Kingdoms | Kouya | | |
| 2002 | Samurai Deeper Kyo | Sarutobi Sasuke | | |
| 2002 | Seven of Seven | Yuuichi Kamichika | | |
| 2002 | Spiral | Eyes Rutherford | | |
| 2002–2007 | Naruto | Gaara | | |
| 2002 | Mobile Suit Gundam SEED | Athrun Zala | | |
| 2002 | Kiddy Grade | Un-ou | | |
| 2002 | I"s | Jun Koshinae | OVA | |
| 2003 | Gunparade March: The New March | Atsushi Hayami | | |
| 2003 | D.N.Angel | Satoshi Hiwatari | | |
| 2003 | Zatch Bell! | Wonrei | | |
| 2003 | Detective Academy Q | Masumi Toujo | | |
| 2003 | Rumic Theater | Shinatome | Ep. 11 | |
| 2003 | Shadow Star | Tomonori Komori | | |
| 2003 | Saiyuki Reload | Cho Hakkai | | |
| 2003 | The Galaxy Railways | Owen | Ep. 9 | |
| 2003 | Uninhabited Planet Survive! | Haward | | |
| 2003 | Chrono Crusade | Chrono | | |
| 2004 | Mezzo DSA | Otokawa Hiroshi | | |
| 2004 | Saiyuki Reload Gunlock | Cho Hakkai | | |
| 2004 | Tenjho Tenge | Masahiro Sanada | Ep. 10 | |
| 2004 | Kyo Kara Maoh! | Saralegi | | |
| 2004 | Sgt. Frog | Saburo | | |
| 2004 | Madlax | Morris Lopis | | |
| 2004 | Gundam SEED Destiny | Athrun Zala | | |
| 2004 | My-HiME | Nagi Homura | | |
| 2004 | Harukanaru Toki no Naka de Hachiyō Shō | Abe no Yasuaki | | |
| 2004 | Yu-Gi-Oh! GX | Edo Phoenix | | |
| 2004 | Genshiken | Manabu Kuchiki | Season 1 only | |
| 2004 | Gakuen Alice | Narumi L. Anju | | |
| 2004 | Meine Liebe | Naoji Ishizuki | | |
| 2005 | Gallery Fake | Hiroto | | |
| 2005 | Sukisho | Kai Nanami | | |
| 2005 | The Law of Ueki | Inumaru | | |
| 2005 | Elemental Gelade | Coud Van Giruet | | |
| 2005 | Doraemon | Prince | Ep. 215 | |
| 2005 | Alien Nine | Yellow Knife | | |
| 2005 | My-Otome | Nagi Dài Artai | | |
| 2005–2006 | Blood+ | Joel Goldschmidt VI | | |
| 2005–2007 | Saint Beast | Kirin no Yuda | OVAs and TV series | |
| 2005 | Nintama Rantarō | Ayabe Kihachirou | | |
| 2006–2006 | Negima! Magister Negi Magi | Fate Averruncus | | |
| 2006 | Kage Kara Mamoru! | Raijuurou Kumogakure | | |
| 2006 | Glass Fleet | Vetti Sforza | | |
| 2006–present | Gintama | Kotaro Katsura | | |
| 2006 | Nana | Okazaki "Shin" Shinichi | | |
| 2006 | Night Head Genesis | Naoya Kirihara | | |
| 2006 | Harukanaru Toki no Naka de – Maihitoyo | Yasuaki Abe | | |
| 2006 | Shōnen Onmyōji | Abe no Seimei (young) | | |
| 2006 | Kekkaishi | Toshihiko Tsukijigaoka | | |
| 2007 | Saiyuki Reload: Burial | Cho Hakkai | OVA | |
| 2007 | Nodame Cantabile | Takahashi Noriyuki | | |
| 2007 | The Galaxy Railways: A Letter from the Abandoned Planet | Killian Black | OVA series | |
| 2007–2017 | Naruto: Shippuden | Gaara | | |
| 2007 | Claymore | Zaki | | |
| 2007 | Idolmaster: Xenoglossia | Karasu | | |
| 2007 | Kōtetsu Sangokushi | Ryomou Shimei | | |
| 2007 | Kamichama Karin | Michiru Nishikiori | | |
| 2007 | Shining Tears X Wind | Kaito Kiriya | | |
| 2007 | Bokurano | Koyemshi | | |
| 2007 | Ice | Julia | | |
| 2007 | Bamboo Blade | Danjūrō Eiga | | |
| 2007–2009 | Shugo Chara! | Tsukasa Amakawa | | |
| 2008 | Rin: Daughters of Mnemosyne | Apos | | |
| 2008 | The Tower of Druaga: The Aegis of Uruk | Kally | | |
| 2008–2017 | Natsume's Book of Friends | Shuichi Natori | TV series and OVAs | |
| 2008 | Casshern Sins | Margo | | |
| 2008 | Akaneiro ni Somaru Saka | Fuyuhiko Nishino | | |
| 2009 | The Girl Who Leapt Through Space | Emilio Surre | | |
| 2009 | The Beast Player Erin | Duke Damiya | | |
| 2009 | Pandora Hearts | Xerxes Break, Emily | | |
| 2009 | Metal Fight Beyblade | Tobio Oike | | |
| 2009 | First Love Limited | Yukito Renjou | | |
| 2009 | Dogs: Stray Dogs Howling in the Dark | Badou Nails | | |
| 2009 | Saint Seiya: The Lost Canvas | Virgo Asmita | | |
| 2009 | Tatakau Shisho – The Book of Bantorra | Mokania | | |
| 2009 | Fairy Tail | Zeref | | |
| 2009–2010 | Kiddy Girl-and | Un-ou | | |
| 2010 | HeartCatch PreCure! | Cologne | | |
| 2010 | Angel Beats! | Mysterious young man | Ep. 12 | |
| 2010 | Hakuouki Hekketsuroku | Tokishige Masaki | | |
| 2010 | The Betrayal Knows My Name | Kanata Wakamiya | | |
| 2010 | Magic Kaito | Saguru Hakuba | | |
| 2010 | Nura: Rise of the Yokai Clan | Inugamigyobu Tamazuki | | |
| 2010–2011 | Hen Semi | Komugi Musashi | OVA and TV series | |
| 2010 | Heaven's Lost Property Forte | Panty Robo | Ep. 5 | |
| 2010 | Star Driver | Head | | |
| 2010–2011 | Princess Resurrection | Emile | OVA | |
| 2010 | Starry Sky | Kotarou Hoshizuki | | |
| 2011 | Saiyuki Gaiden | General Tenpou | OVA | |
| 2011 | Toriko | Tommyrod | | |
| 2011 | Penguindrum | Keiju Tabuki | | |
| 2011 | Alice in the Country of Hearts | Joker | | |
| 2011 | Fate/Zero | Ryūnosuke Uryū | | |
| 2011 | Phi Brain: Puzzle of God | Jikukawa Souji | | |
| 2011 | Ben-To | Hercules | | |
| 2011 | Future Diary | Aru Akise | | |
| 2011 | Lupin: Blood Seal – Eternal Mermaid | | TV special | |
| 2012 | The New Prince of Tennis | Hajime Mizuki | | |
| 2012 | The Knight in the Area | Araki Ryuuchi | | |
| 2012 | Daily Lives of High School Boys | President | | |
| 2012 | Saint Seiya Omega | Pisces Amor | | |
| 2012 | Accel World | Yellow Radio | | |
| 2012 | Arashi no Yoru ni | Kuro | | |
| 2012 | Chōyaku Hyakunin isshu: Uta Koi | Fujiwara no Yoshitaka | | |
| 2012 | Kamisama Kiss | Mikage | | |
| 2012 | Magi: The Labyrinth of Magic | Yunan | | |
| 2012 | Psycho-Pass | Shūsei Kagari | | |
| 2013 | Hakkenden: Eight Dogs of the East | Kagetsu | | |
| 2013 | Amnesia | Kent | | |
| 2013 | Red Data Girl | Hodaka Murakami | | |
| 2013 | The Severing Crime Edge | Seigi Nakajima | | |
| 2013 | A Simple Thinking About Blood Type | O-gata | | |
| 2013 | Arata: The Legend | Harunawa | | |
| 2013 | Saiyuki Gaiden: Kouga no Shou | General Tenpou | OVA | |
| 2013 | Brothers Conflict | Chiaki | | |
| 2013 | Danganronpa: The Animation | Byakuya Togami | | |
| 2013 | Servant × Service | Lucy's father | | |
| 2013 | Devils and Realist | Samael | Ep. 11–12 | |
| 2013 | Kyōsōgiga | Myoe / Inari | | |
| 2013 | Tokyo Ravens | Atsune Hirata | | |
| 2013 | Samurai Flamenco | Beyond Flamenco | | |
| 2013 | Blood Lad | Roi | OVA | |
| 2014 | Nobunagun | Eugène François Vidocq | | |
| 2014 | D-Frag! | Naganuma | | |
| 2014 | One Piece | Cavendish | | |
| 2014 | Captain Earth | Eiji Arashi | Ep. 5 | |
| 2014 | Sengoku Basara: End of Judgement | Hanbei Takenaka | | |
| 2014 | Nobunaga Concerto | Hori Hidemasa | | |
| 2014 | Terra Formars | Joseph Gustav Newton | TV series | |
| 2014–2016 | Mysterious Joker | Viridian | | |
| 2014–2015 | Yona of the Dawn | An Jun-gi | | |
| 2014 | Parasyte | Hideo Shimada | | |
| 2014 | Cardfight!! Vanguard G | Shouma Shinonome | | |
| 2014 | Pokémon Omega Ruby and Pokémon Alpha Sapphire | Daigo | short anime film | |
| 2014 | Juuza Engi: Engetsu Sangokuden: Gaiden Youzhou Genya | Ryuubi | OVA | |
| 2014 | Chain Chronicle | Hero/Haruaki/Black Knight | short anime series | |
| 2015 | Cute High Earth Defense Club Love! | Chizu Kazutake & Tokiwa Tomaru | Ep. 1 | |
| 2015 | Q Transformers: Return of the Mystery of Convoy | Ultra Magnus | | |
| 2015 | World Break: Aria of Curse for a Holy Swordsman | Ando Suruga | | |
| 2015–2017 | Blood Blockade Battlefront | Fallen King Femto | | |
| 2015 | Ace of Diamond: Second Season | Hisashi Watanabe | | |
| 2015–2016 | Snow White with the Red Hair | Izana Wistalia | | |
| 2015 | Rokka: Braves of the Six Flowers | Tgurneu | | |
| 2015 | Lance N' Masques | Shin Hanabusa | | |
| 2015 | Beautiful Bones: Sakurako's Investigation | Itsuki Isozaki | | |
| 2015 | Cyborg 009 | Apollo | OVA | |
| 2016 | Dimension W | Albert Schuman | | |
| 2016 | Divine Gate | Oz | | |
| 2016 | Shōwa Genroku Rakugo Shinjū | Yūrakutei Yakumo VIII (Kikuhiko) | | |
| 2016 | Magi: Adventure of Sinbad | Yunan | | |
| 2016 | Haven't You Heard? I'm Sakamoto | Yoshinobu Kubota | | |
| 2016 | Terra Formars: Revenge | Joseph Gustav Newton | | |
| 2016–2017 | Yu-Gi-Oh! ARC-V | Edo Phoenix | | |
| 2016–2017 | Rin-ne | Kurosu | | |
| 2016 | Classicaloid | Pad-kun | | |
| 2016 | Bungo Stray Dogs | Fyodor Dostoyevsky | | |
| 2016 | March Comes in like a Lion | Tōji Sōya | | |
| 2016 | Monster Strike | Kharma | | |
| 2017 | Shōwa Genroku Rakugo Shinjū: Sukeroku Anew Arc | Yūrakutei Yakumo VIII (Kikuhiko) | | |
| 2017 | Chain Chronicle ~Light of Haecceitas~ | Yuri, Black Knight | | |
| 2017 | Elegant Yokai Apartment Life | Reimei Isshiki | | |
| 2017–present | Boruto: Naruto Next Generations | Gaara | | |
| 2017 | Magical Circle Guru Guru | President of Darkness | Ep. 4, 7, 10–12, 15 | |
| 2017–2018 | Food Wars! Shokugeki no Soma: The Third Plate | Tsukasa Eishi | | |
| 2017 | Girls' Last Tour | Kanazawa | Ep. 3–4 | |
| 2018 | Devils' Line | Megumi Ishimaru | | |
| 2017 | Saiyuki Reload Blast | Cho Hakkai | | |
| 2018 | How Not to Summon a Demon Lord | Keera L. Greenwood | Ep. 6–8 | |
| 2018–2021 | Cells at Work! | Normal Cell / Cancer Cell | Season 1–2 | |
| 2018 | Angolmois: Record of Mongol Invasion | Emperor Antoku | Ep. 6–7 | |
| 2018 | Lord of Vermilion: The Crimson King | Jūmonji Suruga | | |
| 2019 | The Morose Mononokean II | Sakae Ashiya | | |
| 2019 | Kakegurui XX | Rin Obami | | |
| 2019 | Mob Psycho 100 II | Keiji Mogami | | |
| 2019 | 7 Seeds | Chimaki Yamori | | |
| 2019 | Carole & Tuesday | Black Knight | | |
| 2019 | African Office Worker | Company President Turtle | | |
| 2019 | Outburst Dreamer Boys | Faust | | |
| 2019 | Food Wars! Shokugeki no Soma: The Fourth Plate | Tsukasa Eishi | | |
| 2019–2020 | Sword Art Online: Alicization – War of Underworld | Gabriel Miller | | |
| 2019 | Dr. Stone | Hyōga | | |
| 2019–2020 | Ace of Diamond act II | Hisashi Watanabe | | |
| 2020–2023 | Bofuri | Marcus | | |
| 2020 | Darwin's Game | Oboro | Ep. 11 | |
| 2020 | Food Wars! Shokugeki no Soma: The Fifth Plate | Tsukasa Eishi | | |
| 2020 | Re:Zero − Starting Life in Another World | Regulus Corneas | | |
| 2020 | Cells at Work!! The Return of the Strongest Enemy. A Huge Uproar in the Body’s Bowels! | Cancer Cell | Anime film | |
| 2021 | Kemono Jihen | Akio Tademaru | | |
| 2021 | Dragon Quest: The Adventure of Dai | Larhalt | | |
| 2021 | World Trigger | Kazuaki Ōji | Season 2 | |
| 2021 | Fruits Basket: The Final | Akira Soma | | |
| 2021 | Mars Red | Takeuchi | | |
| 2021 | Pretty Boy Detective Club | Odoru Soutouin | Ep. 11 | |
| 2021 | The Case Study of Vanitas | The shapeless one/teacher | | |
| 2021 | The Idaten Deities Know Only Peace | Prontea | | |
| 2021 | That Time I Got Reincarnated as a Slime | Guy Crimson | Season 2 | |
| 2021 | Kimi to Fit Boxing | Hiro | | |
| 2021 | Digimon Ghost Game | Kiyoshirō Higashimitarai | | |
| 2021 | Tesla Note | Pino | | |
| 2021–2024 | Demon Slayer: Kimetsu no Yaiba | Akaza | | |
| 2022 | Saiyuki Reload: Zeroin | Cho Hakkai | | |
| 2022 | Tribe Nine | Shun Kamiya | | |
| 2022 | Requiem of the Rose King | Duke of Richmond | | |
| 2022 | Trapped in a Dating Sim: The World of Otome Games Is Tough for Mobs | Luxion | | |
| 2022 | Skeleton Knight in Another World | Domitianus | | |
| 2022 | Tokyo Mew Mew New | Seiji Aizawa | | |
| 2022 | My Master Has No Tail | Utaroku Ebisuya | | |
| 2023 | By the Grace of the Gods | Caulkin | Season 2 | |
| 2023 | The Fire Hunter | Hibari | | |
| 2023 | Rokudo's Bad Girls | Kota Kijima/Manager | | |
| 2023 | Why Raeliana Ended Up at the Duke's Mansion | Heika Demint | | |
| 2023 | Sorcerous Stabber Orphen: Sanctuary Arc | Armagest | | |
| 2023 | Golden Kamuy | Heita Matsuda | Season 4 | |
| 2023 | My Happy Marriage | Takaihito | | |
| 2023 | Helck | Hon | | |
| 2024 | The Witch and the Beast | Matt Cougar | | |
| 2024 | Mission: Yozakura Family | Asuka Hatoda | | |
| 2024 | Magilumiere Magical Girls Inc. | Kei Koga | | |
| 2024 | Kagaku×Bōken Survival | Kei | | |
| 2024 | Yakuza Fiancé: Raise wa Tanin ga Ii | Kirishima Miyama | | |
| 2024 | Bananya Around the World | Narrator | | |
| 2025 | Solo Leveling: Arise From the Shadow | Ant King / Beru | | |
| 2025 | Koisuru One Piece | Biology Club President | ONA | |
| 2025 | The Banished Court Magician Aims to Become the Strongest | Loki Silveria | | |
| 2025 | Ranma ½ | Hikaru Gosunkugi | Season 2 | |
| 2026 | Fire Force | Oguro | Season 3 | |
| 2026 | Ace of Diamond Act II | Hisashi Watanabe | Season 2 | |
| 2026 | Daemons of the Shadow Realm | Asuma Kagemori | | |
| 2026 | Recommendations from Iwamoto-senpai | Bōkyo Kizujō | | |
| 2026 | The Ogre's Bride | Senya Kiryūin | | |
| 2026 | Jaadugar: A Witch in Mongolia | Dayir | | |

=== Puppet ===
List of voice performances in feature films
| Year | Series | Role | Notes | Source |
|---|---|---|---|---|
| 2018 | Thunderbolt Fantasy Touriken Yuuki 2 | Lóu Zhèn Jiè (Ro Shinkai) / Dì Kōng (Tei Kuu) | Glove Puppetry TV Series | |

=== Theatrical animation ===
List of voice performances in theatrical animation
| Year | Series | Role | Notes | Source |
|---|---|---|---|---|
| 1995 | Slam Dunk Movie 4: Howling Basketman Spirit!! | Ichiro Mizusawa | | |
| 2001 | Saiyuki: Requiem | Cho Hakkai | | |
| 2006 | Detective Conan: The Private Eyes' Requiem | Saguru Hakuba | | |
| 2007 | Bleach: The DiamondDust Rebellion | Sojiro Kusaka | | |
| 2007–21 | Rebuild of Evangelion series | Kaworu Nagisa | | |
| 2010 | Gintama: The Movie | Kotaro Katsura | | |
| 2011 | Mahō Sensei Negima! Anime Final | Fate Averruncus, Quintum | | |
| 2011 | Alice in the Country of Hearts | Joker | | |
| 2012 | Library War: The Wings of Revolution | Mikihisa Komaki | | |
| 2013 | Persona 3 The Movie: No. 1, Spring of Birth | Makoto Yuki, Pharos | | |
| 2013 | Gintama: The Movie: The Final Chapter: Be Forever Yorozuya | Kotaro Katsura | | |
| 2013 | The Garden of Sinners: Future Gospel | Mitsuru Kamekura | | |
| 2014 | Chain Chronicle: Short Animation | Yuri | | |
| 2014 | Persona 3 The Movie: No. 2, Midsummer Knight's Dream | Makoto Yuki, Pharos | | |
| 2015 | Boruto: Naruto the Movie | Gaara | | |
| 2015 | Persona 3 The Movie: No. 3, Falling Down | Makoto Yuki, Pharos, Ryoji Mochizuki | | |
| 2016 | Persona 3 The Movie: No. 4, Winter of Rebirth | Makoto Yuki, Pharos, Ryoji Mochizuki | | |
| 2016–17 | Chain Chronicle Movies | Yuri, Black Knight | | |
| 2017 | Fairy Tail: Dragon Cry | Zeref | | |
| 2018 | Bungo Stray Dogs: Dead Apple | Fyodor Dostoyevsky | | |
| 2018 | Natsume's Book of Friends The Movie: Ephemeral Bond | Shuuichi Natori | | |
| 2018 | Batman Ninja | Red Hood | | |
| 2020 | Survival | Kei | | |
| 2020 | Demon Slayer: Kimetsu no Yaiba – The Movie: Mugen Train | Akaza | | |
| 2020 | Looking for Magical Doremi | Hayato Yabe | | |
| 2021 | Gintama The Final | Kotaro Katsura | | |
| 2022 | Re:cycle of Penguindrum | Keiju Tabuki | | |
| 2023 | Birth of Kitarō: The Mystery of GeGeGe | Genji Nagata | | |
| 2024 | Mobile Suit Gundam SEED Freedom | Athrun Zala | | |
| 2025 | Demon Slayer: Kimetsu no Yaiba – The Movie: Infinity Castle | Akaza | | |
| 2025 | Batman Ninja vs. Yakuza League | Red Hood | | |
| 2026 | New Theatrical Movie Keroro Gunsō: Upon Revival, Immediately Facing the Threat of Earth's Destruction! | Saburo | | |

=== Video games ===
List of voice performances in video games
| Year | Series | Role | Notes | Source |
|---|---|---|---|---|
| 1993 | Night Trap | Danny | MegaCD | |
| 1994 | 3×3 Eyes | Kenichi Yamamoto | PC Engine | |
| 1996 | Lunar: Silver Star Story Complete | Alex | Sega Saturn | |
| 1996 | Riglord Saga 2 | Lagross | Sega Saturn | |
| 1997 | Sparkling Feather | Ruby Feather | PC FX | |
| 1997 | Mega Man Legends | Rockman Juno | | |
| 1997 | Ryuuki Denshou Plu | Sedy Caliber | Windows | |
| 1998 | Panzer Dragoon Saga | Edge | | |
| 1998 | Misa no Mahou Monogatari | Takasumi Aoi | PlayStation | |
| 1998 | Super Robot Wars F Final | Kaworu | PlayStation | |
| 1998 | 3×3 Eyes Tenrin'ou Genmu | Yamamoto Kenichi | Win, PlayStation | |
| 1999 | Eberouge 2 | Alstar | Win95 | |
| 1999 | Macross VF-X2 | Tohma Shun | | |
| 1999 | Suki na Mono wa Suki Dakara Shouganai!! | Kai Nanami | | |
| 1999 | Ouka Houshin | Gi Fuhou | Dreamcast | |
| 2000 | Harukanaru Toki no Naka de | Abe no Yasuaki | PlayStation | |
| 2000 | Gunparade March | Atsushi Hayami | | |
| 2000 | Tales of Eternia | Reid Hershel | | |
| 2000 | Power Stone 2 | Accel | | |
| 2001 | Konohana: True Report | Momoi Meguru | PlayStation, Dreamcast | |
| 2001 | Fantastic Fortune | Shilfis | Windows | |
| 2001 | Gitaroo Man | Prince Zowie, Kazuya | | |
| 2001 | Di Gi Charat Fantasy | Kaine | Also Excellent | |
| 2001 | Sky Gunner | Rival | PlayStation 2 | |
| 2001 | Harukanaru Toki no Naka de 2 | Abe | PlayStation 2 | |
| 2001 | Legaia 2: Duel Saga | Elliot | | |
| 2001 | Inuyasha | Amari Nobunaga | PlayStation | |
| 2002 | Space Channel 5: Part 2 | Purge | | |
| 2002 | Chocolate Kiss | Kouji Miyasaka, Male student A | PlayStation | |
| 2002 | Onimusha 2: Samurai's Destiny | Kotaro Fuma | | |
| 2002 | Galerians: Ash | Rion Steiner, Cain | | |
| 2002 | Tokimeki Memorial Girl's Side | Sakuya Morimura | | |
| 2002 | Galaxy Angel | Camus O. Lamphroaig | | |
| 2002 | Harry Potter and the Chamber of Secrets | Lord Voldemort | PlayStation 2 | |
| 2002 | Samurai Deeper Kyo | Sarutobi Sasuke | | |
| 2003 | Baldr Force EXE | Tooru Souma | | |
| 2003 | Sakura: Setsugekka | Kusanagi Makoto | PlayStation 2 | |
| 2003 | Ys I&II Eternal Story | Luther Gemma | PS2 | |
| 2003–present | Naruto series | Gaara | | |
| 2003 | Kidou Senshi Gundam SEED: Cinema Typing Game | Athrun Zala | Windows | |
| 2003–05 | Zatch Bell! series | Wonrei | | |
| 2003 | Future GPX Cyber Formula: Road to the Infinity series | Seiichiro Shiba | | |
| 2004 | Bloody Roar 4 | Bakuryu | | |
| 2004 | Houkago no Love Beat | Kaito Momose | | |
| 2004 | Tokyo Majin Gakuen Gehōchō: Keppūroku | ? | PlayStation 2 | |
| 2004 | Harukanaru Toki no Naka de 3 | Ridvan | PlayStation 2 | |
| 2004 | Bakumatsu Renka Shinsengumi | Souji Okita | | |
| 2004 | Animamundi: Dark Alchemist | Count St. Germant | | |
| 2005 | Namco × Capcom | Rockman Juno, Gilgamesh | | |
| 2005 | Fullmetal Alchemist 3: Kami o Tsugu Shōjo | Leonid of Diamond Dust | | |
| 2005 | Sengoku Basara series | Takenaka Hanbei | | |
| 2005 | Shinten Makai Generation of Chaos V | Duo | | |
| 2005 | Ururun Quest: Koiyuuki | Tsukishiro | | |
| 2005 | Summon Night EX-Thesis: Yoake no Tsubasa | Nova | | |
| 2005 | invisible sign -is-, invisible sign -is- Nemureru Mori | Makoto Miyake | | |
| 2005 | Rogue Galaxy | Seed | | |
| 2005 | Hoshin Engi | Shinkohyo | | |
| 2006 | Otometeki Koi Kakumei Love Revo!! | Kaede Tokita | PlayStation 2, PSP | |
| 2006 | Samurai Champloo: Sidetracked | Tsurumaki Worso | | |
| 2006 | Brave Story: New Traveler | Ropple | | |
| 2006 | Persona 3 | Main Character, Ryoji Mochizuki, Pharos | | |
| 2006 | Arabians Lost: The Engagement on Desert | Curtis Nile | | |
| 2006 | Phantasy Star Universe | Hyuga Ryght | | |
| 2006 | Gundam Battle Royale | Ken Bederstadt | PSP | |
| 2006 | Jeanne D'Arc | Roger | | |
| 2006 | Lunar Knights | Nero | | |
| 2006 | Tales of the World: Radiant Mythology | Reid Hershel | | |
| 2007 | Luminous Arc | Alph | Nintendo DS | |
| 2007 | Kingdom Hearts Re: Chain of Memories | Zexion | PlayStation 2 | |
| 2007 | Orange Honey: Boku wa Kimi ni Koishiteru | Akira Mizusawa | PlayStation 2 | |
| 2007 | Shining Wind | Kiriya Kaito | PlayStation 2 | |
| 2007 | Mana Khemia: Alchemists of Al-Revis | Vayne Aurelius | | |
| 2007 | Super Robot Wars: Original Generations | Eaglet | PlayStation 2 | |
| 2007 | Dragoneer's Aria | Rusuran Aberichef | PSP | |
| 2007 | Sengoku Basara 2 | Takanaka | Wii | |
| 2008 | Star Ocean: Second Evolution | Ashton Anchors | | |
| 2008 | Chaos;Head | Takashina Fumio | | |
| 2008 | Bleach: The 3rd Phantom | | Nintendo DS | |
| 2008 | Amnesia | Kent | | |
| 2008 | Dissidia: Final Fantasy | Kuja | | |
| 2008 | Hana Yori Dango: Koi Seyo Onago | Seinosuke "Kin-san" Amakusa | | |
| 2009 | Tales of the World: Radiant Mythology 2 | Reid Hershel | | |
| 2009 | Kingdom Hearts 358/2 Days | Zexion | | |
| 2009 | Arc Rise Fantasia | Alf | | |
| 2009 | Puyo Puyo 7 | Ekoro | | |
| 2009 | Starry Sky: In Autumn | Kotarou Hoshizuki | | |
| 2009 | Joker no Kuni no Alice: Wonderful Wonder World | Joker | | |
| 2009 | Bloody Call | Kugami Kyou | | |
| 2009 | Akaneiro ni Somaru Saka Portable | Nishino Fuyuhiko | PSP | |
| 2010 | Clock Zero | Syuuya Tokita | | |
| 2010 | Danganronpa: Trigger Happy Havoc | Byakuya Togami | | |
| 2011 | The Last Story | Jill | | |
| 2011 | 7th Dragon 2020 | Ayafumi Kirino | | |
| 2012 | Shining Blade | Isari | | |
| 2012 | Kingdom Hearts 3D: Dream Drop Distance | Ienzo | Nintendo 3DS | |
| 2012 | Danganronpa 2: Goodbye Despair | Byakuya Togami (Ultimate Imposter) | | |
| 2012 | BlazBlue: Chrono Phantasma | Amane Nishiki | | |
| 2013 | 7th Dragon 2020-II | Ayafumi Kirino | | |
| 2013 | JoJo's Bizarre Adventure: All Star Battle | Vinegar Doppio | | |
| 2013 | Snow Bound Land | Ivan | | |
| 2014 | Persona Q: Shadow of the Labyrinth | Persona 3 Main Protagonist | | |
| 2014 | Freedom Wars | Mattias "Leo" Bruno | | |
| 2014 | Danganronpa Another Episode: Ultra Despair Girls | Byakuya Togami | | |
| 2014 | Chain Chronicle | Various Arcana/Fighters | 46 characters | |
| 2015 | 7th Dragon III Code: VFD | Blaster Raven | | |
| 2015–2023 | Final Fantasy XIV | Elidibus, Themis | | |
| 2015 | JoJo's Bizarre Adventure: Eyes of Heaven | Vinegar Doppio | | |
| 2016 | Zero Escape: Zero Time Dilemma | Eric | | |
| 2016 | I Am Setsuna | Fides | | |
| 2016 | Onmyōji | Hangan, Heiyō, Yamawaro | | |
| 2016 | Honkai Impact 3rd | Otto Apocalypse | | |
| 2017 | Xenoblade Chronicles 2 | Nefer | | |
| 2018 | Persona 3: Dancing in Moonlight | Makoto Yuuki | PS4, PS Vita | |
| 2018 | Xenoblade Chronicles 2: Torna – The Golden Country | Hugo | | |
| 2018 | Persona Q2: New Cinema Labyrinth | Persona 3 main character | Nintendo 3DS | |
| 2019 | Jump Force | Gaara | | |
| 2019 | Kingdom Hearts III | Ienzo | Nintendo Switch, PS4, Xbox One | |
| 2019 | Punishing: Gray Raven | Wanshi | | |
| 2019 | Saint Seiya Awakening | Virgo Shaka | Android | |
| 2020-2025 | Arknights | Phantom, Tragodia | iOS, Android | |
| 2020 | Kingdom Hearts: Melody of Memory | Ienzo | Nintendo Switch, PS4, Xbox One | |
| 2020 | Fitness Boxing 2: Rhythm and Exercise | Hiro | | |
| 2021 | Genshin Impact | Kamisato Ayato | | |
| 2022 | Cookie Run: Kingdom | Clotted Cream Cookie | | |
| 2022 | Honkai Impact 3rd | Void Archives | | |
| 2022 | Valkyrie Elysium | Cypher | PlayStation 4, PlayStation 5, Windows | |
| 2023 | Octopath Traveler II | Temenos Mistral | | |
| 2023 | Honkai: Star Rail | Luocha | | |
| 2024 | Persona 3 Reload | Main Character | | |
| 2025 | Granblue Fantasy | Fate Averruncus | | |
| 2026 | Dark Auction | Hell | | |
| 2027 | Honkai: Nexus Anima | Otto | | |

=== Tokusatsu ===
List of voice performances in tokusatsu
| Year | Series | Role | Notes | Source |
|---|---|---|---|---|
| 2006 | GoGo Sentai Boukenger | Wicked Dragon Dembey | Ep. 37 | |
| 2007 | Juken Sentai Gekiranger | Fierce Beast Fly-Fist Bae | Eps. 2 – 49 | |
| 2007 | Juken Sentai Gekiranger: Nei-Nei! Hou-Hou! Hong Kong Decisive Battle | Fierce Beast Fly-Fist Bae | Movie | |
| 2008 | Juken Sentai Gekiranger vs Boukenger | Fierce Beast Fly-Fist Bae | OV | |
| 2008 | Kamen Rider Kiva | Demon Imperial Dragon Tatsulot | Eps. 24-48 | |
| 2008 | Kamen Rider Kiva: King of the Castle in the Demon World | Demon Imperial Dragon Tatsulot | Movie | |
| 2009 | Engine Sentai Go-onger vs. Gekiranger | Fierce Beast Fly-Fist Bae | Movie | |
| 2012 | Kaizoku Sentai Gokaiger vs. Space Sheriff Gavan: The Movie | Fierce Beast Fly-Fist Bae | Movie | |
| 2023 | Ultraman Regulos | Dias | Eps. 1 – 6 | |
| 2023 | Ultraman Blazar | Earth Garon/Earthy (EGOISS) | Eps. 16 – 25 | |
| 2023 | Ultra Heroes EXPO 2024 New Year Festival NEW GENERATION THE LIVE: Ultraman Blazar ～The Other Hero～ | Earth Garon/Earthy (EGOISS) | Stage show | |
| 2024 | Ultraman Blazar The Movie: Tokyo Kaiju Showdown | Earth Garon/Earthy (EGOISS) | Movie | |

=== Audio drama ===
List of voice performances in audio dramas
| Series | Role | Notes | Source |
|---|---|---|---|
| 7th Dragon 2020 & 2020-II: Tokyo Chronicle | Ayafumi Kirino | | |
| Akane Iro ni Somaru Saka | Nishino Fuyuhiko | | |
| Cafe Kichijoji de | Hifumi Minagawa | | |
| Dogs: Stray Dogs Howling in the Dark | Badou Nails | | |
| Hatoful Boyfriend | Sakuya Le Bel Shirogane | | |
| Idolmaster Xenoglossia | Karasu | | |
| Kami-Kaze | Ishigami Kamuro | | |
| Legend of Crystania | Redon | | |
| Mai Hime Destiny | Homura Nagi | | |
| Mo Dao Zu Shi/Ma Dou So Shi | Jin Guangyao/Jin Kouyou | | |
| Neon Genesis Evangelion | Kaworu | | |
| Pani Poni Second Season | Uchuujin-buka A | | |
| Photon | Photon Arth | | |
| Revelations: Persona | Protagonist/Yuuya | | |
| Saiyuki series | Cho Hakkai | | |
| Samurai Deeper Kyo | Sarutobi Sasuke | | |
| Satisfaction Guaranteed | Yoshitsune Shima | | |
| Shounen Onmyouji: Kazane hen | | | |
| Sohryuden: Legend of the Dragon Kings | Amaru Ryudo | | |
| The Young Magician | Karuno | | |
| Tonde Burin | Mizuno Kouichi | | |
| Beyond Twilight 百鬼夜行抄, Hyakkiyakoushou | Ritsu Iijima | | |
| Bouken Radio Movie | Sou Meihou | | |
| Dark Hunter -Ijigen Gakuen | | | |
| Double Call | | | |
| Kodomotachi ha Yoru no Juunin | | | |
| Konohana: True Report | Momoi Meguru | | |
| Luna | Ares | | |
| Outo Ayakashi Kitan | Touya | | |
| Romantist Taste | | | |
| Rui no Masaiban | Hauna | | |

=== Dubbing roles ===
List of voice performances in overseas dubs
| Series | Role | Voice dub for / Notes | Source |
|---|---|---|---|
| The King and the Clown | Gong-gil | Lee Joon-gi | |
| Fly, Daddy, Fly | Go Seung-suk | Lee Joon-gi | |
| May 18 | Kang Jin-woo | Lee Joon-gi | |
| Time Between Dog and Wolf | Lee Soo Hyun \ Kay | Lee Joon-gi | |
| Iljimae | Lee Gyeom | Lee Joon-gi | |
| Arang and the Magistrate | Kim Eun-oh | Lee Joon-gi | |
| Two Weeks | Jang Tae-san | Lee Joon-gi | |
| Gunman in Joseon | Park Yoon-kang / Hasegawa Hanjo | Lee Joon-gi | |
| Never Said Goodbye | Jun Ho | Lee Joon-gi | |
| Resident Evil: The Final Chapter | Lee | Lee Joon-gi | |
| 200 Cigarettes | Tom | Casey Affleck | |
| All the Pretty Horses | Jimmy Blevins | Lucas Black | |
| Amazing Stories season 4 | Jobe | | |
| American Graffiti | Terry "The Toad" Fields | Charles Martin Smith; 2011 Blu-Ray edition | |
| The Batman | Edward Nashton / Riddler | Paul Dano | |
| Brotherhood of Blades | Jin Yichuan | Ethan Li | |
| Carriers | Danny | Lou Taylor Pucci | |
| Child's Play 3 | Andy Barclay | Justin Whalin | |
| Deep Impact | Leo Biederman | Elijah Wood | |
| Die Hard with a Vengeance | Dexter | Michael Alexander Jackson | |
| Final Destination | Carter Horton | Kerr Smith | |
| Harry Potter and the Chamber of Secrets | Tom Marvolo Riddle | Christian Coulson | |
| Independence Day: Resurgence | Charlie Miller | Travis Tope | |
| Jason Bourne | Christian Dassault | Vinzenz Kiefer; 2022 BS Tokyo edition | |
| Killing Eve | Mo Jafari | Raj Bajaj | |
| Leap of Faith | Boyd | Lukas Haas | |
| Light of Day | Billy Tetoa | | |
| Love, Death & Robots | K-VRC | | |
| Mad Men | Pete | | |
| Marley & Me: The Puppy Years | Bodi Grogan | Travis Turner | |
| Mars Attacks! | Richie Norris | Lukas Haas | |
| Memories of Murder | Park Hyeon-gyu | Park Hae-il | |
| Mrs. Doubtfire | Chris Hillard | Matthew Lawrence | |
| Murder by Numbers | Justin Pendleton | Michael Pitt | |
| My Girl 2 | Nick Zsigmond | Austin O'Brien | |
| A Nightmare on Elm Street | Glen Lantz | Johnny Depp | |
| Ocean Girl | Benny | | |
| Red Cliff film series | Kentei, Zhang Yun | | |
| Reign of Fire | Jared Wilke | Scott James Moutter | |
| seaQuest DSV | Lucas Wolenczak | | |
| Shakespeare in Love | John Webster | Joe Roberts | |
| She-Wolf of London | Mick | Steve Edwards | |
| Star Trek: Deep Space Nine | Jake Sisko | Cirroc Lofton | |
| Star Trek: The Next Generation | Wesley Crusher | Wil Wheaton | |
| Star Wars Episode IV: A New Hope | Luke Skywalker | Mark Hamill special edition | |
| The Stolen Princess | Kabutoo | | |
| Stuber | Stu Prasad | Kumail Nanjiani | |
| The Amazing Spider-Man 2 | Harry Osborn / Green Goblin | Dane DeHaan | |
| The Beach | Richard | Leonardo DiCaprio | |
| The Many Saints of Newark | Tony Soprano | Michael Gandolfini | |
| The Matrix Reloaded | Kid | | |
| The Matrix Revolutions | Kid | | |
| The Matrix | Mouse | Matt Doran; 2002 Fuji TV edition | |
| The Monkey King 2 | Zhu Bajie | Xiaoshenyang | |
| The Monkey King 3 | Zhu Bajie | Xiaoshenyang | |
| The Santa Clause | Bernard the Head Elf | David Krumholtz | |
| The Talented Mr. Ripley | Tom Ripley | Matt Damon | |
| Tinker Bell | Bobble | | |
| Tinker Bell and the Lost Treasure | Bobble | | |
| Tinker Bell and the Great Fairy Rescue | Bobble | | |
| Tinker Bell and the Pirate Fairy | Bobble | | |
| Titanic | Jack Dawson | Leonardo DiCaprio; 2003 NTV edition | |
| Velvet Goldmine | Brian | Jonathan Rhys Meyers | |
| West Side Story | Indio | Gus Trikonis; 1990 TBS edition | |
| Wild America | Marty Stouffer Jr. | Scott Bairstow | |
| ZeroZeroZero | Chris Lynwood | Dane DeHaan | |

== Awards ==
| Year | Award | Category | Result | Ref. |
|---|---|---|---|---|
| 2004 | 27th Anime Grand Prix | Voice actor of the Year | Won | |
| 2007 | 1st Seiyu Awards | Best Actors in supporting roles | Won | |
| 2026 | 20th Seiyu Awards | Most Valuable Seiyū Award | Won | |
