= Hideyuki =

- Gender: Male

Origin
- Origin: Japanese
- Meaning: Different meanings depending on the kanji used

Hideyuki (written: 英行, 英之, 英幸, 秀行, 秀幸, 秀至, 秀之 or 偉之) is a masculine Japanese given name. Notable people with the name include:

- Hideyuki Akai (赤井 秀行; born 1985), Japanese footballer
- Hideyuki Akaza (赤座 英之), Japanese urologist
- Hideyuki Anbe (安部 秀之), Japanese video game programmer
- Hideyuki Arata (新田 英之), Japanese engineer and physicist
- Hideyuki Ashihara (芦原 英幸; 1944–1995), Japanese karateka
- Hideyuki Awano (阿波野 秀幸; born 1964), Japanese ice hockey player
- Hideyuki Busujima (born 1952/1953), Japanese billionaire businessman
- Hideyuki Fujino (藤野 秀之; born 1974), Japanese drifting driver
- Hideyuki Fujisawa (藤沢 秀行; 1925–2009), Japanese Go player
- Hideyuki Fukasawa (深澤 秀行), Japanese composer
- Gamō Hideyuki (蒲生 秀行; 1583–1612), Japanese daimyō
- Hideyuki Hirayama (平山 秀幸; born 1950), Japanese film director
- Hideyuki Hori (堀 秀行; born 1954), Japanese voice actor
- Hideyuki Ishida (石田 英之; born 1982), Japanese footballer
- Hideyuki Kikuchi (菊地 秀行; born 1949), Japanese writer
- Hideyuki Kurata (倉田 英之; born 1968), Japanese writer and screenwriter
- Hideyuki Nagashima (長島 偉之; born 1953), Japanese sport wrestler
- Hideyuki Nakamura (中村 英之; born 1984), Japanese footballer
- Hideyuki Nozawa (野沢 英之; born 1994), Japanese footballer
- Hideyuki Ohashi (大橋 秀行; born 1965), Japanese boxer
- Hideyuki Osawa (大澤 秀之; born 1979), Japanese ice hockey player
- Hideyuki Otake (大竹 秀之; born 1967), Japanese volleyball player
- Hideyuki Sakai (坂井 秀至; born 1973), Japanese Go player
- Hideyuki Takano (髙野 秀行; born 1972), Japanese shogi player
- Hideyuki Takei (竹井 秀行; born 1970), Japanese pole vaulter
- Hideyuki Tanaka (田中 秀幸; born 1950), Japanese voice actor
- Hideyuki Ujiie (氏家 英行; born 1979), Japanese footballer
- Hideyuki Umezu (梅津 秀行; 1955-2024), Japanese voice actor
- Hideyuki Yonehara (米原 秀幸; born 1967), Japanese manga artist
