= List of Sorcerous Stabber Orphen (1998 TV series) episodes =

Sorcerous Stabber Orphen is a Japanese anime series based on the light novel series of the same name written by Yoshinobu Akita and illustrated by Yuuya Kusaka. The original 1998 anime was broadcast in two seasons, with the first 24 episodes by J.C.Staff airing from October 3, 1998, to March 27, 1999, and the second season from October 2, 1999, to March 26, 2000, on TBS. The adaption follows the adventures of Krylancelo Finrandi now named Orphen as he seeks to free his close friend Azalie from her curse with his friends along Majic and Cleao.

The television series was licensed by ADV Films, who released the first season on DVD in 2001. Sorcerous Stabber Orphen 2: Revenge: The second anime series was released on DVD in North America in December 2003 by ADV Films. It is 23 episodes in length. In 2009, Sentai Filmworks released both seasons in an 8-disc DVD box set, and then in 2019 in a 2-disc SD Blu-ray set.

== Series overview ==
Season	Episodes	Originally released	
Season	Episodes	First released	Last released
1	24	October 3, 1998	March 27, 1999
2	23	October 2, 1999	March 25, 2000

== Episode list ==
=== Season 1 (1998–1999) ===
No.	Title	Original release date
1	"The Sword of Baltanders"; Transliteration: "Wa ga na wa Ōfen" (Japanese: 我が名はオーフェン)	October 3, 1998
2	"The Blood of August"; Transliteration: "Chi no hachigatsu no kyōfu" (Japanese: 血の八月の恐怖)	October 10, 1998
3	"Battle of the dragon" Transliteration: "Wa ga tabidachi ni tsudoe nakama-tachi" (Japanese: 我が旅立ちに集え仲間達)	October 17, 1998
4	"Guardian of the Garden"; Transliteration: "Wa ga hanazono ni nemure mamono" (Japanese: 我が花園に眠れ魔物)	October 24, 1998
5	"Curse of Wolves (Part 1)"; Transliteration: "Doragon ni idakareshi miko" (Japanese: ドラゴンに抱かれし巫女)	October 31, 1998
6	"Curse of the Wolves (Part 2)"; Transliteration: "Wa ga mori ni hoero ōkami" (Japanese: 我が森に吼えろ狼)	November 7, 1998
7	"The Ruins of Baltanders"; Transliteration: "Barutoanderusu no iseki" (Japanese: バルトアンデルスの遺跡)	November 14, 1998
8	"Azalie"; Transliteration: "Tenma no majo no himitsu" (Japanese: 天魔の魔女の秘密)	November 28, 1998
9	"The Relic, Part 1"; Transliteration: "Unga no miyako no onna" (Japanese: 運河の都の女(パートナー))	December 5, 1998
10	"The Relic, Part 2"; Transliteration: "Wa ga mei ni shitagae dōru" (Japanese: 我が命にしたがえ機械(ドール))	December 12, 1998
11	"Leki's Little adventure" Transliteration: "Reki no chīsana bōken" (Japanese: レキの小さな冒険)	December 19, 1998
12	"The Black Tiger"; Transliteration: "Wa ga yūjō no ebiotoko" (Japanese: 我が友情の海老男)	December 26, 1998
13	"Flameheart"; Transliteration: "Wa ga kokyō ni kaere tsuioku" (Japanese: 我が故郷に帰れ追憶)	January 9, 1999
14	"Do You Mine?"; Transliteration: "Koerarenu omoi..." (Japanese: 越えられぬ想い…)	January 16, 1999
15	"Sister of the Moon"; Transliteration: "Gekka no majutsushi" (Japanese: 月下の魔術士)	January 23, 1999
16	"The Black Tiger Returns"; Transliteration: "Ebiotoko futatabi" (Japanese: 海老男ふたたび)	January 30, 1999
17	"Of Swords and Secrets"; Transliteration: "Wa ga ken ni himerareshi nazo" (Japanese: 我が剣に秘められし謎)	February 6, 1999
18	"Birds and Bees"; Transliteration: "Temera totto to ken kaese!" (Japanese: てめえらとっとと剣返せ!)	February 13, 1999
19	"Dark Deception"; Transliteration: "Sorezore no omoi..." (Japanese: それぞれの想い…)	February 20, 1999
20	"Snakes in the Temple"; Transliteration: "Nijiiro no himitsu" (Japanese: 虹色の秘密)	February 27, 1999
21	"Revelations of the Runes"; Transliteration: "Seinaru kako no gen'ei" (Japanese: 聖なる過去の幻影)	March 6, 1999
22	"Three's a Charm"; Transliteration: "Mayoeru aoki hitomi" (Japanese: 迷える碧き瞳)	March 13, 1999
23	"The Anger of Azalie"; Transliteration: "Majo azarī" (Japanese: 魔女アザリー)	March 20, 1999
24	"Journey's End"; Transliteration: "Wa ga tabiji no shūen" (Japanese: 我が旅路の終焉)	March 27, 1999

=== Season 2: Revenge (1999–2000) ===
No. overall	No. in season	Title	Original release date
25	1	"Heal my Soul, Hot Springs"; Transliteration: "Wa ga tamashii iyase onsen" (Japanese: 我が魂いやせ温泉)	October 2, 1999
26	2	"The Big Bath of Betrayal"; Transliteration: "Uragiri no daiyokujō" (Japanese: 裏切りの大浴場)	October 9, 1999
27	3	"The Supply Store from Hell"; Transliteration: "Jigoku no yōhinten" (Japanese: 地獄の洋品店)	October 16, 1999
28	4	"Wonderful ~ The Ripple of Love"; Transliteration: "Kaiki ai no hamon" (Japanese: 怪奇・愛の波紋)	October 23, 1999
29	5	"Awaken, Beloved One"; Transliteration: "Mezame yo, itoshi ki onna" (Japanese: 目覚めよ、愛しき女[ひと])	October 30, 1999
30	6	"Shrimp Man, Crab Woman"; Transliteration: "Ebi otoko, kani onna" (Japanese: 海老男、蟹女)	November 6, 1999
31	7	"The Sweet Trap of an Errand"; Transliteration: "Otsukaino amai wana" (Japanese: おつかいの甘いワナ)	November 13, 1999
32	8	"Is That a Bird?"; Transliteration: "Tori! Tori! Tori?" (Japanese: 鳥!鳥!鳥?)	November 27, 1999
33	9	"The Lady of the Speed of Sound"; Transliteration: "Onsoku no kifujin" (Japanese: 音速の貴婦人)	December 4, 1999
34	10	"The Phantom Mountain of Snow"; Transliteration: "Maboroshino yuki yama" (Japanese: まぼろしの雪山)	December 11, 1999
35	11	"The Crab & the Boy"; Transliteration: "Kani to shōnen" (Japanese: カニと少年)	December 18, 1999
36	12	"The Big Courtroom of Justice"; Transliteration: "Fukushū no dai hōtei" (Japanese: 復讐の大法廷)	December 25, 1999
37	13	"The Young Woman Who Caught a Cold"; Transliteration: "Kaze ninatta shōjo" (Japanese: 風邪になった少女)	January 8, 2000
38	14	"What?! Majic has..." Transliteration: "Etsu!? Majiku ga..." (Japanese: えっ！マジクが・・・)	January 15, 2000
39	15	"Running Away on the Night of a Full Moon"; Transliteration: "Mangetsu no yoru no iede" (Japanese: 満月の夜の家出)	January 22, 2000
40	16	"Turmoil! A Luxurious Passenger Ship"; Transliteration: "Nettō! Gōkakyakusen" (Japanese: 熱闘!豪華客船)	February 5, 2000
41	17	"It Appears! Fake Orphen"; Transliteration: "Deta! Nise Ōfen" (Japanese: 出た!にせオーフェン)	February 12, 2000
42	18	"Rhapsody of Sorrow"; Transliteration: "Kanashi mino komoriuta" (Japanese: 哀しみの子守唄（ラプソディー）)	February 19, 2000
43	19	"Lycoris Neilsen"; Transliteration: "Rikorisu Nirusen" (Japanese: リコリス・ニールセン)	February 26, 2000
44	20	"The Truth inside the Storm"; Transliteration: "Arashi no nakano shinjitsu" (Japanese: 嵐の中の真実)	March 4, 2000
45	21	"Sorcerer Majic"; Transliteration: "Majutsushi majiku" (Japanese: 魔術士マジク)	March 11, 2000
46	22	"Soul Sisters"; Transliteration: "Omoi, sure chigatte..." (Japanese: 想い、すれ違って…)	March 18, 2000
47	23	"I am the Sword, Drawn from the Light"; Transliteration: "Ware ha hanatsu hikari no hakujin" (Japanese: 我は放つ光の白刃)	March 25, 2000

== See also ==
- List of Sorcerous Stabber Orphen (2020 TV series) episodes
