= Akaza =

Akaza (written: 赤座) is a Japanese surname. Notable people with the surname include:

- Hideyuki Akaza (赤座 英之), Japanese urologist
- Miyoko Akaza (赤座 美代子, born 1944), Japanese actress
- Akaza Naoyasu (赤座 直保, died 1606), Japanese daimyō
- Akaza Shichirōemon (赤座 七郎右衛門, died 1582), Japanese samurai

== Fictional characters ==
- Akari Akaza (赤座 あかり), a character in the manga series YuruYuri
- Akaza, from Demon Slayer: Kimetsu no Yaiba
