= List of Shadow Star characters =

This is a profile of characters from Shadow Star, known in Japan as Narutaru (Japanese: なるたる), and events in which they are involved.

== Main characters ==
=== Bearers and Shadow Dragons ===
==== Shiina Tamai ====
Shiina Tamai (玉依 秕 (シイナ), Tamai Shiina) is the protagonist of Shadow Star. She acts very mature for her age, and though she does not get the best grades, she is talented at cooking and athletics. She always tries her hardest to become stronger, often facing newer and more difficult challenges. While outwardly cheerful and optimistic about everything, on the inside the protagonist's hurt stems back as far as her name; in her dream in the first episode she says, "Are you calling me? That name, Shiina... I don't like it. So next time you want to call me, do me a favor and don't use that name." Using heart-thumping music of the same three piano keys to further the idea of death, Shiina asks, "Am I going to be gone from this world?" She fears losing those closest to her, but must endure.

As the second half of the manga begins and at the end of the anime, Shiina works hard and obtains a scholarship to the prestigious Banda Academy Junior High. In the manga she then moves in with Takeo and Norio after her father's aircraft was attacked by dragons a second time. In an attempt to save Takeo and herself from a United States military attack on a nearby escaped dragon, a missile cuts Shiina's body in half. The following nuclear explosion completely destroys her body. Soon after, she is reborn off the shore of her grandparents' island and it is revealed that her (and Mamiko Kuri's) dragons are, in fact, the whole world. The daughter of Shiina and Takeo (conceived when Shiina has sex with Takeo after declaring her love for him, before the destruction of the world) becomes the new Eve when Mamiko destroys and recreates the planet.

Shiina and her friends usually write her given name with katakana (sometimes as シイナ and sometimes as シーナ); Shiina's mother, Misono, prefers the kanji rendering of her given name (秕), which means "a seed that cannot germinate" or "an empty husk." Shiina's given name is romanized as Shiina in English-language versions and the Japanese graphic novels, while Kodanclub romanizes her given name as Shina.

Voiced by: Asami Sanada (Japanese); Kelly Ray (English)

===== Hoshimaru =====
Hoshimaru (ホシ丸) is Shiina's companion. He does what Shiina unconsciously wants to do or have happen. This means that in reality she does not wish to casually speak with him, and that everything he does is actually Shiina's will - whether for good or for bad.

In the anime it is not stated, but later in the manga it becomes known that Hoshimaru is Takeo Tsurumaru's dragon, not Shiina's, which explains why she could not link with the creature. When Takeo dies, Hoshimaru attempts to turn his bearer into a virgin princess, but somehow fails.

Voiced by: Satsuki Yukino (Japanese)

==== Akira Sakura ====
Akira Sakura (佐倉 明, Sakura Akira) is an eighth grade student (meaning she is two years older than Shiina) who always seems out-of-place. Akira likes to hide in the shadows where she can feel protected from the outside world, nervous of others around her and afraid to trust nearly anyone. Living above her family's restaurant, her parents wish her to try harder in school and not skip day after day. When she does go to school, because she is linked with a dragon she named Ensof (エンソフ, En Sofu), she often relives visions of falling from the sky - her constant passing out and vomiting in the middle of class makes her a serious outcast to the other students. Instead of trying to free herself of her timidity, she creates further barriers, with the exception of befriending Shiina. During her and Shiina's battle with Komori, he tells Akira that she has beautiful hair, and as soon as the battle is over she locks herself in her room and cuts off her long hair in fear.

As a young child, Akira was very friendly and outgoing, but quickly transformed into a hopelessly shy and insecure person after being sexually abused by her father. She keeps all of her pain inside but ends up unleashing her rage on her abusive father. She spends the rest of the manga in a juvenile detention center, but later is apparently released and finds Sudo, who shows her what truly happened to Komori.

In Volume 12, when Akira is seriously injured by a dragon battle (she had helped Shiina find Sudo, also pulling her out of a paralyzed state when her father dies and urging her to make peace with her mother) and sent to a local hospital. Its implied somebody threw her out of the hospital window. Most likely the angry mob who blame the Dragon children for the state of the world.

Voiced by: Mamiko Noto (Japanese); Renee Gloger (English)

==== Takeo Tsurumaru ====
Takeo Tsurumaru (鶴丸 丈夫, Tsurumaru Takeo) is one of the passengers who disappeared from Shiina's plane flight, whom she confuses with the writer of a threatening note. He helps Shiina and Akira many times, although he does not always understand where his responsibilities should stand. He is quite lecherous, having five illegitimate children and three girls pregnant during the course of the series. Eventually, he impregnates Shiina too, but right before that she teaches him that there is a difference between love and procreation.

In Volume 10, Takeo gets caught in a nuclear explosion while trying to escape the hellfire of U.S. soldiers attacking an escaped dragon, and later shows obvious side effects of radiation poisoning, including severe scars and complete hair loss. In Volume 11, Takeo kills some of the city thugs - mostly the same ones who kidnap and murder his best friend Norio in Volume 10 and rape Mamiko in Volume 11, including the thug who tortured, raped and killed Norio. Almost at the end of Volume 12, Shiina says she loves him and they have sex, which leads to Shiina becoming pregnant.

In Volume 12 of the manga, the remaining city thugs fatally shoot him in his chest at his apartment. For unexplained reasons Hoshimaru (his dragonchild, not Shiina's as many thought) cannot manage to transform him into a virgin princess. Takeo's death is the last straw that triggers Shiina's destruction and rebuilding of the human world.

Voiced by: Eiji Miyashita (Japanese); Parker Anderson (English)

==== Norio Koga ====
Norio Koga (古賀 のり夫, Koga Norio) is the other missing passenger from the plane flight, as well as Takeo's roommate and friend. He's nicknamed "Nori-rin" by one of the girls who is a mother to one of Takeo's kids. He possesses a high-level shadow dragon named Vagina Dentata (ヴァギナデンタータ, Vagina Dentāta) that often follows Takeo, and crafts new shadow dragons as a sort of hobby. Norio is very aloof and rude around other people, and it is touched on a few times that he is angry at the human race. But he comes to tolerate Shiina, has fierce loyalty for Takeo, and his deepest wish is to have his child.

Norio experiences a turbulent death: a gang of street punks and city thugs approaches his and Takeo's house. Norio comes outside when he hears a noise, and collapses after a blow to the stomach. The thugs drag Norio into the house and ask for Takeo's whereabouts. When Norio states that he is not there, a thug slices Norio's left ear with a sword, causing an earring to fall to the floor. Norio tries to run away, but a sword slices his achilles tendon and Norio falls to the ground. One of the thugs, after punching a fellow thug, decides that he wishes to take advantage of Norio.

After Norio is stripped and placed on a bed and a video camera is turned on, the thug rapes him. Norio withstands the torture as bravely as he can, not screaming or crying a single tear even when he receives stabs in his lower parts, while still using Vagina Dentata to help Takeo and Shiina in their mission to aid Jane Franklin. At some point he starts to pass out from the blood loss which is when the thug gives him an adrenaline injection in the neck, but even so Norio keeps choosing to protect Tsurumaru instead of using his dragon to save his life. When he finally dies, so does his dragon, from which a fetus develops - an expression of his love for Takeo and his secret dream to bear Takeo's child. It's only then that he speaks his final words, lamenting not having the opportunity to declare this love to him.

Later, a badly injured Takeo and Shiina's parents find Norio's severed head attached to the "body" of Norio's favorite doll; days after that Takeo kills the thug who murdered Norio and dispose the thug's body in space.

Voiced by: Kouki Akaishi (Japanese); Jamie McGonnigal (English)

==== Virgin Princess ====
The Virgin Princess (乙姫, Otohime), appearing on a large dragon, is equivalent to a goddess of dragons. She rarely makes appearances, thus seeing her even once in a lifetime is a rare and treasured event. The virgin princess is a replica of its owner's body whose soul has been absorbed by his or her baby dragon, thus becoming an adult dragon. Jyun explains to Shiina that the princesses get their name because they are "joined together" only with their dragons. There is more than one virgin princess, and they may be male or nonhuman.

In the manga, the one who most often makes an appearance and saves Shiina many times over is revealed to be Misho Tamai (玉依 実生, Tamai Mishō), Shiina's deceased sister. In the manga, Shunji (Shiina's father) discovers a different virgin princess while on a mission in Russia.

=== Normal Humans ===
==== Shunji Tamai ====
Shunji Tamai (玉依 俊二, Tamai Shunji) is Shiina's father and a pilot for a small aviation company, which offers flight training services for the JASDF. He flies a Lockheed F-104 Starfighter, later transitioning to a Sukhoi Su-27 Flanker towards the end of the manga. He and his wife Misono separated years ago, and he lives with Shiina. Once a sensational ace pilot for the National Defense Force, his abilities have diminished since an undisclosed incident involving a dragon. He loves his daughter dearly and wants always to protect her, even though she is often the one who ends up protecting him. In Volume 12 of the manga, Shunji dies after Bungo's dragon fires its gun at his plane's cockpit while he is trying to eject, after he caused Bungo's dragon to be sucked into his plane's engine. Shiina and Akira witness his death.

Voiced by: Nobuo Tobita (Japanese); Josh Mosby (English)

==== Misono Tamai ====
Misono Tamai (玉依 美園, Tamai Misono) is Shiina's mother and Shunji's ex-wife. Misono often chides Shiina for the young girl's poor grades, and deep down believes that Shiina is responsible for the death of her first daughter Misho, to the point of trying to strangle Shiina once. Always calm and cold, she works with the government and Miyako on the shadow dragon case.

In Volume 11, Misono shows signs of softening up after a conversation with Akira, in which she says that mothers and daughters always have complicated relationships. In Volume 12, right after Shunji's death, she is finally reconciled with Shiina. In the final chapter, some men who wanted to kill Shiina fatally shoot Misono while she is in her car, right in front of Shiina.

Voiced by: Chizuru Fuyuki (Japanese); Bella Hudson (English)

=== Minor characters ===
==== Satoru ====
Satoru (さとる) is a friend of Shiina who lives on her grandparents' island. He is one year younger than Shiina, and being from a small island, is often annoyed by Shiina's "city" mannerisms.

Voiced by: Kouki Akaishi (Japanese); Marc Thompson (English)

==== Takaya Mizushima ====
Takaya Mizushima (水嶋 貴也, Mizushima Takaya) is a classmate and friend of Hiroko and Shiina. He has a crush on Shiina and has two older sisters who constantly tease him about it. He is the first one to realize Hiroko's strange behavior, but does not know that it is due to the bullying. After coming across Aki Honda and her group of bullies raping Hiroko with a test tube, he yells at the bullies to stop and drives them away. Then, Mizushima travels to Hiroko's house and tells her that he will protect her from her troubles; Hiro tells him that it is "too late," but he is not killed by Hiroko's dragon due to his kindness. Later attending a coeducational junior high school, he appears sporadically throughout the rest of the series.

Voiced by: Hikaru Tokita (Japanese); Stephanie Boyle (English)

==== Ishida ====
Ishida (石田) is a ninth grader and classmate of Akira. He has had an attraction towards Akira for a few years, and is very defensive of her. In Volume 6 (Volume 7 in the English-language manga), Ishida helps carry Akira into the infirmary after she collapses in physical education class. Akira, who had been teased that day and desperately wanted someone to confirm her worth, briefly falls in love with Ishida in the nurse's office. She pulls him onto one of the beds, takes off her bloomers and underpants, and tries to get him to have sex with her, but he nervously declines and leaves the room. He then sits alone and berates himself for his weakness, as Akira loudly masturbates in the infirmary.

Voiced by: Yūki Tai (Japanese); David Moo (English)

==== Suzuki ====
Suzuki (鈴木) is Shunji's assistant and a pilot for Motoki. He is a kind, middle-aged man who looks after Shiina.

Voiced by: Toru Sakura (Japanese); Bruce Aarons (English)

==== Misho Tamai ====
Misho Tamai (玉依 実生, Tamai Mishō) is Shiina's deceased older sister, dead when she was attending junior high. She was cheerful and outgoing, but after the Tamai family moved she suddenly started to act much more somber and depressed.

The day Shiina was born, Misho told her then-unnamed little sister she would get a cute name, but immediately after that asked her parents if things would be better when she died. Some days later, Misho was found dead in a puddle of her own blood; the injury was inflicted after she was dead, and her demise was filed under "unknown case". Misho's death traumatized Misono so badly that she started smoking and once even attacked little Shiina, which prompted her and Shunji's divorce.

Misho is later seen as one of the Virgin Princess (乙姫, Otohime), appearing more or less often and saving Shiina several times.

== Antagonists ==
=== Bearers and Shadow Dragons ===
==== Tomonori Komori ====
Tomonori Komori (小森 朋典, Komori Tomonori), to the outside world, appears to be a kind, polite and popular boy who wants to become a doctor; in reality, however, he is a remorseless killer who wishes to change the world by sacrificing the educated in a similar manner to the Khmer Rouge's revolution in Cambodia. He tells Akira that he is going to build an everlasting empire, and that he will be king and she will be his queen. He dies at the hands of Hoshimaru after introducing immense fear into Shiina's and especially Akira's hearts. His friends and the general public do not know of his death, believing that he has simply gone missing; Shiina and Akira are the only ones who know the truth. Komori had a severely disabled mother whom he was looking after; she starves to death soon after her son's death, being unable to take care of herself. It is noted in the manga that they had no other responsible family members.

In the manga, after Komori is killed, his dragon Push Dagger (プッシュ・ダガー, Pusshu Dagā) begins absorbing his body in an attempt to become a virgin princess, but the two are discovered by a team of medical researchers and the half-boy-half-dragon corpse is brought to their underground laboratory and hooked up to machines in an attempt to stop the absorption.

In the English-language Central Park Media anime, his name is Akinori Komori.

Voiced by: Akira Ishida (Japanese); Walter Barnes (English)

==== Satomi Ozawa ====
Satomi Ozawa (小沢 さとみ, Ozawa Satomi) is one of Komori's associates; Satomi is a haughty, stubborn girl who goes to an exclusive all-girls school called Banda Academy. Her dragon child is a flower-shaped creature called Amapola (アマポーラ, Amapōra). She fulfills a favor for Sudo by kidnapping Akira, who is believed to have a dragon. She wishes to kill people, but lacks the strength until she finally unleashes Amapola's power on soldiers on the East Fuji military training ground, creating a field of corpses. She used to have a romantic relationship with Bungo, but has become cold and distant from him since her priorities moved to the dragons.

Satomi holds a particularly strong grudge against Shiina for both killing Komori and attempting to stop her malicious plans, and often discusses with Bungo her desire to kill Shiina. When Shiina enters Banda Academy, she befriends Satomi without knowing of her evil intentions; the truth is only realised when the two visit a gallery show held by Norio and Satomi recognises one of the dolls as being based on Bungo's dragon. Later, while on a school trip, Satomi tries to kill Shiina with Amapola and succeeds in severely injuring her, including breaking her arm, but her plans are ultimately thwarted again. While she is unconscious in the aftermath, she remembers her past and how she and Bungo first came to love one another; afterwards, she becomes close to Bungo once again.

Satomi's fate at the end of the series is never determined; she is last shown screaming when Bungo dies, and then overlooking the sea while Amapola supports Bungo's corpse in a standing position. Amapola and Bungo's dragon are shown in a merged state after Mamiko destroys and recreates the world.

Voiced by: Kaori Tanaka (Japanese); Renee Goldstein (English)

==== Bungo Takano ====
Bungo Takano (高野 文吾, Takano Bungo) is a high school student and one of Komori's associates. He is usually very cheerful and carefree, though serious and supportive of his teammates in battle. He is a military fanatic with a great fondness for guns and cannons, handily supplying such weapons to his human allies when needed. His dragon is named Hainuwele (ハイヌウエレ, Hainuuere) and resembles an angel with talons; in its first appearance, it attacks Shiina's father while flying a jet plane.

Though a member of his high school's track team, Bungo often skips practice to spend time with Satomi, whom he still has strong feelings for despite an apparent past break-up. He is extremely protective of Satomi, having defended her from bullies at least once when they were younger, and his usual cheerful demeanour vanishes completely when he sees her being hurt in any way. Although he and Sudo work together, he is often puzzled by Sudo's plans.

During his second attack on Shiina's father, his dragon gets sucked into Shunji Tamai's jet turbine and is crushed; Bungo himself collapses in Satomi's arms and dies soon afterwards, after experiencing extreme pain. Hainuwele and Amapola are shown in a merged state after Mamiko destroys and recreates the world. In the English-language manga, Kazuyuki Takano is his name.

Voiced by: Hisayoshi Suganuma (Japanese); Frankie Rome (English)

==== Naozumi Sudo ====
Naozumi Sudo (須藤 直角, Sudō Naozumi) is one of Komori's friends; he is very calm and polite, but is in fact a dangerous sociopath who does not hesitate to commit crimes such as grand theft auto and murder to accommodate his ideals. Sudo himself claims that he has surpassed a human level of emotional discomfort and desire. He sees himself as someone who protects Earth, even though he sends Satomi Ozawa to kidnap Akira to discover whether she has a dragon. He believes he can change the world, releasing it of its bonds to tradition, custom, and common sense by means of a society based on one's abilities; he claims that only those who affect the world truly deserve to live, and that the human race is wasting the limited amount of resources available to them.

Sudo's dragon resembles Hoshimaru and Ein Soph, but is significantly larger and possesses a menacing armored faceplate. Sudo never named him, but he is referred to as Trickster (トリックスター, Torikkusutā) by Mamiko. It is noted that his parents and older brother are missing, and suggested in a conversation between him and one of his old teachers that he may be responsible for his family's "disappearance".

Eventually, he, Satomi, and Bungo begin their plan to destroy the world by means of a nuclear winter, but he starves himself to death while endlessly plotting how to select the master race of this new world he would have created. With his dying breath, he says that what he hates most of all is himself.

Voiced by: Hideki Tasaka (Japanese); Michael Mercer (English)

==== Mamiko Kuri ====
Mamiko Kuri (涅 見子, Kuri Mamiko) is a mysterious girl with cold eyes whom Sudo took under his wing when he found out she had a shadow dragon, though it is never clear how he discovered her. She does not like to wear clothing, preferring to be naked when indoors and only using a flimsy dress without any underwear while outside her home or school. She tends to be rather quiet, and often considers the people around her to be inferior, much to Satomi's chagrin when the two first meet.

Sudo eventually enrolls her at Banda Academy, the same school that Shiina and Satomi attend. She explains to Shiina late in the story that they possess the same shadow dragon, Sheol (シェオル, Sheoru), and it is the earth itself. They must judge this world and make the choice of what kind of world it will become. It is also noted that she has no family, and seems to have been created by the earth to serve as Shiina's dark side.

Several gang members, who kill Norio in Volume 10 and Tsurumaru in Volume 12, rape and impregnate Mamiko in Volume 11. With all of Shiina's close friends and family dead and Mamiko's tremendous power, in Volume 12 of the manga Mamiko murders the gangsters who raped her. She also helped Shiina reset the world. They begin the world over again, with Mamiko's son as the new Adam of the reborn world.

Voiced by: Satsuki Yukino (Japanese)

=== Normal Humans ===
==== Tatsumi Miyako ====
Tatsumi Miyako (宮子 巽, Miyako Tatsumi) is a government agent responsible for investigating the shadow dragon case. He is one of the first to realize Shiina's significance in the dragon events, and eventually teams up with Sudo's team to try and hunt down the remaining dragon bearers. He sometimes acts very childish and feels like everything he does is right. He is also fiercely nationalistic, and often voices his opinions on Japan being the greatest and most powerful nation in the world. At the end of the series he is stabbed in the chest by a man, who, along with a mysterious woman, seems to want revenge for a wrong thing Miyako did to them in the past.

==== Aki Sato ====
Aki Sato (佐藤 明希, Satō Aki) is another government agent and Tatsumi's secretary. Due to her beauty, many men at the office try to catch her attention, not knowing that she has a fiancée who is rather nervous and bumbling. Without her lover nearby, she is a cold and heartless manipulator who cares for nothing but her own power. At the end of the series, Sato stays alive until the world is reborn.

== Third Party ==
=== Bearers and Shadow Dragons ===
==== Jyun Ezumi ====
Jyun Ezumi (江角 ジュン, Ezumi Jun) is a calm, collected girl a little older than Shiina. The dragon Nendo (念土; lit. 'Broomstick'), which she travels with, looks like a broomstick, so when Shiina first meets her she is mistaken for a witch. She appears briefly and apparently died in a car crash two years before she meets Shiina. Nendo, who turns out to belong to Jyun's friend Kyoji Fukuyama (福山 京児, Fukuyama Kyōji), has an ability that allowed Kyoji to take her physical form when his own body died in an accident. Jyun's fake body and Kyoji's soul merge with the dragon, causing them to evolve into a full dragon and virgin princess. The same dragon then takes the form and face of Shoko's, Kyoji's cousin and friend.

Voiced by: Satsuki Yukino (Japanese); Lisa Ortiz (English)

==== Hiroko Kaizuka ====
Hiroko Kaizuka (貝塚 ひろ子, Kaizuka Hiroko) (spelled as Hiroko Kaizuka (貝塚 ひろこ, Kaizuka Hiroko) in the anime), nicknamed Hiro (ひろちゃん, Hiro-chan) is an extremely intelligent girl, albeit quiet and modest, as well as Shiina's classmate and close friend. Additionally, she is also a dragon bearer, although this is not immediately revealed. A group of bullies consisting of Aki Honda, Miyoko Shito, Hiroka Takamura, and Mihaya Ozaki who torture her when she does not get low scores on exams; the manga reveals an occasion where bullies force Hiroko to ingest worms from a beaker repeatedly and a separate occasion where the same bullies rape Hiroko with a test tube. Additionally, Hiroko's parents scold her for not receiving better marks, unaware that their daughter's slipping grades are the price to pay for the bullies to leave her alone. She is able to only find solace in Shiina, however, she cannot approach Shiina about the bullying but endures it silently until the day she snaps.

After experiencing the unfairness of modern society and being separated from Shiina due to her father's orders, Hiroko wishes that everything would disappear. This activates her shadow dragon, Oni (鬼; lit. 'Demon'), which she proceeds to use to commit a string of brutal murders including stabbing and dismembering Mihaya in a dark alley; crushing the skull of Aki Honda's brother (who Aki had a sexual relationship with, and who is only referred to as Aki's lover in the English-language manga) against a wall; forcing worms down Aki's throat, then using a talon to rape her and tear open her abdomen before ripping her body in half; and throwing Hiroka out of a classroom window before the eyes of the rest of the class in retribution for her bullying. Additionally, Oni severely maims Miyoko by ripping her lower leg off and breaking several of her ribs and then scars Shiina's left hand when she tries to fend Oni off.

When Shiina later confronts Hiroko at her home, she is unable to talk her out of her madness. Hiroko tells her that she has decided to stop enduring and that she still has one more person to kill, Shiina's father, who is held hostage by Oni. Seeing Shunji as an obstacle to her and Shiina's friendship and believing that Shiina would be better off without her father, Hiroko wills Oni to kill him as well. This sends Shiina flying into a rage, Hiroko chides Shiina's cowardice, her last words to Shiina are, "You can't save everyone with kindness".

Voiced by: Sakura Nogawa (Japanese); Flora Stanberg and Natasha Peru (English)

==== Robert Franklin ====
Robert Franklin (ロバート・フランクリン, Robāto Furankurin) is the son of Jane Franklin. He has a debilitating illness and is on life-support.

His shadow dragon is Tarasque (タラスク, Tarasuku). It resembles a traditional European dragon or wyvern, but with a body made of a tangle of wires and cables similar to Robert's life-support equipment.

=== Normal Humans ===
==== Shoko Fukuyama ====
Shoko Fukuyama (福山 笙子, Fukuyama Shōko) is a friend of Jyun Ezumi, and cousin and friend of Kyoji Fukuyama. Shoko is emotional and passionate, and loves Kyoji in a deep romantic way even though he is a family member. She is heartbroken when Kyoji gets in an accident and has to be hooked up to life support machines in a hospital. She and Jyun were writing letters to each other after Jyun moved away from Tokyo, but when Jyun appears at Kyoji's hospital and tells Shoko off for being selfish and weak, Shoko is hurt even more.

Shoko befriends Shiina and pours out her troubles to her at the hospital. When Kyoji dies, the following day Shoko and Shiina see his dragon and virgin princess in the sky. Shoko begins to cry and screams to him that she can be strong and go on loving him. After that, Jyun, Kyoji, and Shoko are never seen again.

Voiced by: Naoko Suzuki (Japanese); Veronica Taylor (English)

==== Aki Honda ====
Aki Honda (本田 亜季, Honda Aki) is the cruelest of the girls that bully Hiroko, and thus the group's unofficial leader. Yasuhito, who is her older brother in the Japanese manga and anime (boyfriend in the English-language manga), teaches her various methods to torture Hiroko. Aki is responsible for forcing Hiroko to drink juice with worms in it, as well as for raping her with the test tube.

After the second incident, Aki, dressed only in a lingerie top in the manga (panties are added in the English and German versions) and a nightgown in the anime, and her brother/lover Yasuhito, are sitting in their apartment when Oni breaks through the wall. Hiroko's dragon instantly kills Yasuhito by smashing his head into a wall. After he dies, Oni forces Aki to ingest worms and then kills her in a way that mirrors her torture of Hiroko; Oni rapes Aki with one of its talons, forcing it far enough into her that it pierces her stomach from the inside, and then tears open Aki's abdomen. The original Japanese version of this scene is so brutal that the English-language manga removes entire pages from the scene, including the final image showing Aki's body cut in half, and rearranges the scene so that one instance of Oni's talon slicing through Aki's stomach is seen.

In the anime version, the torture of Aki after the worms is not explicitly shown. Oni holds a talon before her face and transforms it into a test tube shape before lowering it threateningly; all that is shown after that is Aki's thrashing legs and screaming face, and soon afterwards, the shadow of Aki's body being pierced. In all versions of Shadow Star, Aki is given the fatal hit at the hands of Oni.

Voiced by: Kahoru Sasajima (Japanese); Katherine Heller (English)

==== Miyoko Shito ====
Miyoko Shito (市東 美代子, Shitō Miyoko) is a friend of Shiina, she remains always nervous when she helps bully Hiroko because she fears Shiina's potential reaction. Her lack of confidence in her own strength undoubtedly leads to her involvement in the group that bullies Hiroko. The night that the group rapes Hiro with a test tube, Miyoko is late to join them and gets beaten up by the rest of the bullies for her incompetence.

After the deaths of Aki and Mihaya, Miyoko was the first one to realize that Hiroko's bullies were the ones being targeted, and tells the teacher about the bullying and her suspicions. Hiroko's dragon Oni appears at Shiina's school and rips Miyoko's left leg off of her body; Shiina prevents the dragon from killing Miyoko (although a last-minute expression of regret on Miyoko's part towards their treatment of Hiroko may have given Oni pause). Miyoko is taken to the hospital, where she survives but must live the rest of her life in a wheelchair.

Voiced by: Yuuya Yoshikawa (Japanese); Lotus (English)

==== Hiroka Takamura ====
Hiroka Takamura (高村 宏華, Takamura Hiroka) is one of the girls who bullies Hiroko. Hiroka joined their group out of jealousy for Hiroko's perfect test grades. She tries to keep the group's actions a secret at all costs, and protests when Miyoko tells the teacher about what the group had been doing. When Hiroko's dragon Oni appears at Shiina's school, it drops Hiroka out of a window in front of the whole class.

Voiced by: Megumi Kobayashi (Japanese)

==== Mihaya Ozaki ====
Mihaya Ozaki (尾崎 三早, Ozaki Mihaya) is a classmate of Shiina's and a member of the group that bullies Hiroko. She bullies Hiro along with other girls out of jealousy. Mihaya becomes the first victim of Hiroko's dragon Oni; when she is walking home alone at night after the test tube incident, Oni kills Mihaya in a dark alleyway. Her death is witnessed by a man who walked past her.

Voiced by: Megumi Kojima (Japanese); Carol Lewis (English)

==== Jane Franklin ====
Jane Franklin (ジェーン・フランクリン, Jēn Furankurin) is an American woman and the stubborn and strong mother of a boy with cancer, Robert (ロバート, Robāto), who owns a dragon, Tarasque (タラスク, Tarasuku), that escaped its prison in the United States. It flies to Japan and rampages through the streets of Tokyo in Volume 10. Jane meets Shiina, and though they are suspicious of each other at first, they eventually join forces along with Takeo in an effort to stop Robert's dragon. Ultimately, they manage to stop Tarasque.
