= List of Dogs: Bullets & Carnage characters =

The protagonists of the Dogs and Dogs: Bullets & Carnage series as depicted in the anime adaptation. From left to right: Naoto Fuyumine, Badou Nails, Heine Rammsteiner and Mihai Mihaeroff.

The Dogs anime and manga series (split between Dogs: Prelude and Dogs: Bullets & Carnage) features a cast of fictional characters created by Shirow Miwa. The storyline is set in a dystopic, unnamed European city, where crimes and atrocities are common. To make matters worse, an organization that runs deep below the lowest underground levels begins terrorising the populace through genetic engineering experiments and extreme violence. Dogs: Prelude is composed of four loosely connected stories that revolve around one of four antihero characters. The Dogs: Bullets & Carnage sequel focuses in these four characters as they collaborate to find the entrance to "below", fighting through soldiers from the organization.

One protagonist of Dogs, Heine Rammsteiner, is an emotionally distant gunman who endured genetic experiments during his childhood "below". He often works with Badou Nails, a freelance photographer and information broker. The two meet Naoto Fuyumine, a swordswoman with a black katana. She is searching for another Naoto, who carries a similar sword, and must find a way "below" to do so. Badou enlists the help of Mihai Mihaeroff, a retired assassin, in his search for this information. The four encounter the series' antagonists: the people who belong to the organization "below". Giovanni has endured the same genetic experiments as Heine during his childhood, and Richter Berthein attacked Badou and his brother in the past. Both work for Angelika Einstürzen, Heine and Giovanni's "mother" who conducts genetic experiments to create "the ultimate human weapon". The four are also attacked by another of Einstürzen's subordinates, Campanella Frühling, who has her own set of motives.

The characters developed by Miwa have been praised for their interesting, contemporary and stylish design. However, they have been criticized for falling into the "_____ with guns" and "tough-guy" clichés.

== Creation and conception ==
The author Shirow Miwa named Heine Rammsteiner and Badou Nails after the bands Rammstein and Nine Inch Nails, stated as two of the author's favorite bands on his personal site.

== Protagonists ==
=== Heine Rammsteiner ===
Voiced by: Takahiro Sakurai (Drama CD and anime adaptation)

Heine Rammsteiner (ハイネ・ラムシュタイナー, Haine Ramushutainā) is an albino gunman who had undergone genetic manipulation and implants as a child. He has the remnants of a "Kerberos Spine" collar fused to the back of his neck, which gives him inhuman strength and regenerative ability, thanks to experiments conducted by his "mother", Angelika Einstürzen.

Raised by Einstürzen in an underground research facility established to create the "ultimate human weapon", Heine's understanding of humanity and family is very skewed. Einstürzen, who sees his proficiency in combat and ability to take charge of most situations, selects him as the receptor of the "Kerberos Leader Spine", which should have enabled him to control the other test subjects. The Spine give Heine a second persona independent of his own: the "Dog", which is both incredibly bloodthirsty and insane. The "Dog" takes over Heine in times of violence or stress. For example, just after being synchronized with the Spine, the "Dog" leads Heine to kill Lily, a girl he considered his younger sister, who killed the other test subjects (save for Giovanni) in a frenzy. After realizing what had happened, he attempted to kill everyone involved with the Kerberos project in a berserker rage.

As a result of the Dog's actions, Heine is apathetic and distant from almost all other people. Also, due to the previously-depicted event, and the twisted form of love Einstürzen lavished on him (while calling herself his "mother"), Heine developed gynophobia, an abnormal fear of women, and usually suffers a mental breakdown when in close proximity to a woman. Heine, however, develops a close bond with Nill after discovering she is also a genetic experiment and that he can come into physical contact with her. Heine is often Badou's "work partner".

Heine carries two guns: a white Mauser C96 pistol connected to his belt by a long chain attached to the base of the grip, and a black Luger P08 pistol. He often uses the chain for close-range combat, choking or restraining opponents with it. In Stray Dogs, the Mauser pistol does not have a chain.

=== Badou Nails ===
Voiced by: Akira Ishida (Drama CD and anime adaptation)
Badou Nails (バドー・ネイルズ, Badō Neiruzu) is a chain-smoking, freelance information broker and photographer. Aside from his noticeable red hair, Badou wears an eyepatch on his right eye as a result of a tragedy seven years ago, when Richter Berthein slashed his eye out and killed his older brother Dave (デイヴ, Deivu), a P.I. As Heine's "work" partner during missions given out by Granny Liza, they are known by most of their adversaries as "White Hair and Eye-Patch," and share a dysfunctional (but brotherly) bond. His mood directly corresponds to the availability of cigarettes and the level of nicotine in his blood, which can swing from elation (high nicotine) to outright murderous (low nicotine). He had an older brother named David Nails whom he believes is dead. Dave is thought to be the person who inspired him to become a freelance information broker and is the reason why he smokes. In Dogs, he uses a pair of Ingram MAC-10 machine pistols.

=== Naoto Fuyumine ===
Voiced by: Shizuka Itō (Drama CD and anime adaptation)
Naoto Fuyumine (冬峰・直刀, Fuyumine Naoto) is a young, beautiful swordswoman who wields a black katana. She has a large X-shaped scar on her chest, a remnant of events years ago in which she and her parents were slashed down by an unknown assailant. Clinging to her life, the trauma of watching her parents brutally murdered in front of her eyes has left her amnesic. That same night, she is taken in, raised and trained by the swordsman Fuyumine, whom she believed murdered her parents. Because of her amnesia, she was given the name "Naoto" and would train with Fuyumine for years. After Naoto finds that Magato, another pupil "senior" to Naoto, has killed Fuyumine, she learns that Fuyumine is not the one who killed her parents, and that the real murderer is a "Naoto from below". Realizing her mistake, she would come to acknowledge her mentor as a father figure from then on, and in his honor would take his name into her own, as Naoto Fuyumine, along with inheriting his coat and black katana. She then begins a search for the "original Naoto" to exact revenge for her parents and teacher, which leads to her meeting with Heine, Badou, and Mihai.

As the series progresses, Naoto encounters the real killer of her parents, Campanella Frühling, twice. However, Naoto does not learn that Campanella was the "original Naoto" until their second meeting, where it is also revealed that Naoto herself is a creation of scientific engineering, a body double of Frühling. Her supposed parents were actually researchers-turned-traitors of the Einstürzen organization, and she is tormented by the suggestion that her mentor, Fuyumine, took her in because he was aware of who she was, or rather, what she was. She recovers from the shock somewhat thanks to Heine.

She and Heine are opposites in terms of ideals, and almost always clash heads. Despite their disagreements, their contrasting fighting styles complement each other numerous times. They are almost always teamed up later on as the manga progresses, and have developed a very shaky (but mutual) understanding of each other. She is the only other woman aside from Nill that Heine has willingly been in physical contact with without suffering from a mental breakdown. Of the four protagonists, she and Mihai are the most level-headed ones, but she often falls victim to her own emotions. She is exceptionally skilled in combat, but because of her conscience and lack of killing intent, she is sometimes put at a disadvantage. Her trademark black katana, if wielded correctly, has the ability to kill anyone with a Kerberos Spine implant.

=== Mihai Mihaeroff ===
Voiced by: Akio Ōtsuka (Drama CD and anime adaptation)
Mihai Mihaeroff (ミハイ・ミハエロフ, Mihai Mihaerofu) is a retired assassin and is considerably older than the rest of the cast. Despite this, he retains a muscular build in addition to scruffy facial hair. Due to his years as an assassin, he remains calm under pressure. Mihai has a long-standing friendship with Kiri, the owner of a local restaurant and former prostitute. Ten years prior to the start of Dogs, he was a hired assassin for a gang boss and became mentor to the boss' son, Ian. During this time, Mihai was romantically involved with the prostitute Milena, but the relationship ended when Ian grew into his teens and murdered her. In the Dogs chapter Weepy Old Killer, Mihai confronts Ian and, after failing to protect him during an assassination attempt, admits he was afraid of losing Ian.

Of the four protagonists, Mihai is the most level-headed, experienced, and least anti-heroic of the group. Despite his old age and being human, Mihai has skills that equate or even exceed most of the cast. However, Mihai has a terrible sense of direction and has a constant run of bad luck. He and Badou share a close bond along with Kiri and Mimi, and also shares concern for Heine and Naoto. So far, his link to the underground is not as deep as the others, but Richter Berthein seems to know a great deal about the assassin.

== Antagonists ==
Three of the antagonists as they appear in the Dogs manga. From left to right: Richter Berthein, Campanella Frühling and Giovanni.

Most of Dogs' antagonists belong to the obscure Einstürzen organization, which runs "below" the underground levels of the city. Angelika Einstürzen runs genetic experiments and aims to create the "ultimate human weapon". She is referred to as "Mother" by all of her subjects, who consider each other "siblings". Giovanni was one of her many subjects. Unlike Heine, he did not turn against her and works alongside her army. Giovanni's "sisters", the twins Luki and Noki, also work alongside Einstürzen, but they are shown to fear her. The twins have been seen traveling with Campanella Frühling on occasion. Frühling controls her own small army of genetic experiments. She and her army travel on large trains armed with hidden cannons. Richter Berthein, who has since defected from the organization, was a squad leader in an army similar to Frühling's. The soldiers dress in black uniforms and wear black, dog-themed gas masks.

=== Angelika Einstürzen ===
Angelika Einstürzen (アインシュテルツェン, Anjerika Ainshuterutsen) conducted experiments on Heine, Giovanni, Lily and many other children. She is referred to as "Mother" by the subjects, including Luki and Noki, although Heine is her "favorite". She refers to herself as the subjects' physician. She conducts these experiments to create the "ultimate human weapon", and enjoys the slaughtering the children cause. Her surname is derived from that of German band Einstürzende Neubauten's, much like how Heine Rammsteiner and Badou Nails' were derived from Rammstein and Nine Inch Nails respectively.

=== Giovanni Rammsteiner ===
Voiced by: Shigeru Nakahara (Drama CD and anime adaptation)

Giovanni Rammsteiner (ジョヴァンニ・ラムシュタイナー, Jovaani Ramushutainā), Heine's younger "brother", was also subjected to the Kerberos implants, although the results began to take effect later. He shares a spine collar similar to Heine's, and bears extraordinary healing abilities. Giovanni can be identified by his bug-eyed sunglasses and mop-top haircut. Although his "mother" Einstürzen genetically altered him, he works alongside her army. He also wields dual Walther P38 pistols. Giovanni likes to taunt Heine, especially concerning Lily's death, hoping to call out the "Dog". He has vivid and traumatic memories of the experiments he endured. Giovanni was sent to terminate the Head Councilman, but was captured himself. He is now held in house arrest by Bishop and the Councilman. He first appears in Stray Dogs Howling in the Dark.

=== Luki and Noki ===
Luki (ルキ, Ruki) and Noki (ノキ, Noki) are a pair of small twin sisters. They wear matching dresses that sport rabbit motifs, pink and black hats, striped leggings, and very large sleeves, which conceal giant weapons. They also have heterochromia in their eyes in the reverse form of each other. Their twisted view of life leads them to treat killing as a way of "having fun", even treating a bounty hunt as a game of tag. Luki, dressed mostly in black, has a large knife and throws smaller knives. Noki, dressed mostly in pink, has a machine gun. They are very agile, acrobatic, and have immense strength and regenerative ability. They refer to Heine and Giovanni as older "brothers", and are afraid of their "mother" Einstürzen.

=== Campanella Frühling ===
Campanella Frühling (カンパネルラ・フリューリング, Kanpanerura Furyūringu; German spring) is a woman who works for Einstürzen and controls her small army consisting entirely of genetic experiments. She has her own set of motives, including revenge. She wears a pin-striped suit. She and her army carry katanas similar to the one Naoto uses. In chapter 60, she was revealed as the "original Naoto".

=== Richter H. Berthein ===
Richter H. Berthein (リヒター＝H＝ベルトハイン, Rihitā H Berutohai), also known as Herbst (ヘルプスト, Herupusut; German autumn), was a soldier for Einstelzen's army. When Badou and his brother were investigating the underground seven years ago, he led the group sent to kill them. He was the one who attacked Badou, causing him to lose his right eye. Since then, Berthein has left "below" and studied to become the conductor of an orchestra. Because he has a sense of fulfillment he did not have before, he does not want to return to the underground. Although he states he is much kinder and gentler than he used to be, he has no qualms about hypnotizing the orchestra members into attacking Badou and Mihai, then setting the orchestra hall to explode.

=== Magato Fuyumine ===
Magato Fuyumine (冬峰・曲刀, Fuyumine Magato) is a psychotic young man who was taken in and trained by the swordsman Fuyumine under circumstances similar to Naoto's. He openly displayed an aggressive attitude toward the man and later kills him. When Naoto learns this, she bests him in a fight. Magato is the one who tells her about the "original Naoto" who carries a katana similar to Fuyumine's. He is later seen working as a hired assassin, although he tends to kill his clients. He is voiced by Takeshi Kusao on the drama CD and in the anime adaptation.

== Other characters ==
Aside of the main cast, there are many other characters in Dogs. Some of these characters are integral to either the protagonists' backstories, or the advancement of the story.

=== Kiri ===
Kiri (キリ) is the owner of the local restaurant, Buon Viaggio, where the characters tend to meet. She is a former prostitute and has a long-standing friendship with Mihai. She is voiced by Sayaka Ohara on the drama CD and in the anime adaptation.

=== Ian ===
Ian (イアン) is a gang boss' son who was trained by Mihai. He killed Milena in a fit of jealousy, believing that she "would take Mihai away from me". He is voiced by Kōji Yusa on the drama CD and in the anime adaptation.

=== Milena Teslawska ===
Milena Teslawska (ミレーナ, Mirēna) is a prostitute who was romantically involved with Mihai ten years ago. She was murdered by Ian at least ten years ago. She is voiced by Kaya Matsutani on the drama CD and in the anime adaptation.

=== Mimi ===
Mimi (ミミ) is a freelance information broker similar to Badou, with whom she is a friend and confidant of. She also enjoys calling Mihai "hubby" or "Handsome". She often jokes at Badou's expense, usually from the messes he gets into. She mostly gets involved with the story when Badou requests for her to investigate the swords that both Naoto and Einstürzen's soldiers use. She is voiced by Ryōko Shiraishi on the drama CD and in the anime adaptation.

=== Fuyumine ===
Fuyumine (冬峰) was an older swordsman who took in Naoto after the murder of her parents. He taught her swordsmanship and gives her the name Naoto, a name from his past, as she could not remember her own. He used to belong to a group that abducted children for those "below", though he defected from them, killing any former group members who crossed his path. He is killed by Magato. His full name is Murato Fuyumine. He is voiced by Koyama Rikiya on the drama CD and in the anime adaptation.

=== Bishop ===
Bishop (ビショップ, Bishoppu), truly Ernst Rammsteiner (エルンスト・ラムシュタイナー, Erunsuto Ramushutainā), is the only priest in an old church and has known Heine for a long time. He claims he is blind, able to "see" using his other senses. However, he is a lolicon and keeps a wide variety of dresses in gothic lolita fashion. Bishop is also a swordsman of remarkable skill, described by Heine as the church's "fierce guardian". He was the first person to receive the Kerberos Spine, having a collar similar to Heine's on his neck; as well as the first failed experiment. How Bishop had escaped the Below is unknown. Bishop is voiced by Toshihiko Seki on the drama CD and in the anime adaptation.

=== Nill ===
Nill (ニル, Niru) is a fourteen-year-old mute girl who was genetically modified so a small pair of feathered wings extends from her back. Despite being shy and naïve, she is kind and gentle as well. In the prequel chapter Stray Dogs Howling in the Dark, Heine saves her from brothel gangsters who intended to keep selling her as a prostitute. She is the only female (apart from Naoto) around whom Heine does not suffer mental breakdowns upon physical contact, save for the first time. She and Naoto develop a bond and often spend time together. She is voiced by Mamiko Noto on the drama CD and in the anime adaptation.

=== Lily ===
Lily (リリィ, Ririi) is Heine's younger "sister", whom Heine's "Dog" persona killed before he left Einstürzen's underground facility. Lily also endured the genetic experiments conducted by Einstürzen, wore a collar around her neck, and shared Heine's berserker tendencies; however, she showed less control over herself compared to Heine, who usually brought her back to her senses. She is voiced by Rina Satō on the drama CD.

=== Grandma Liza ===
Grandma Liza (リザ, Riza) is an old short woman with cat ears. She often assigns Heine and Badou various jobs, and seems to be the head of her own gang.

== Reception ==
The characters of Dogs have received praise and criticism from several publications for anime, manga, and other media. Carlo Santos of Anime News Network commented that the loosely connected characters "provide the backdrop for mouth-watering eye candy" and credits Miwa's ability to create a manga storyline around Mihai, "the very opposite of a spunky teenage protagonist". However, he criticized the series for being another "pompous, preening '_____ with guns' series" and believed Miwa is "cycling through all the usual tough-guy tropes" and the characters are riddled with clichés. Santos also commented that even though the characters encounter each other eventually, it is "not the same thing as actually kicking off a storyline together". Ain't It Cool News's Scott Green stated that "the real note of distinction" came from Badou's story and how it did not mention "the tragedy that defines its subject's life". He also thought that "the notion of a group of characters who aren't a team is intriguing".

The visual appearance of the characters have also received notice from reviewers. Leroy Douresseaux of Coolstreak Cartoons commented that the characters dress well and that most of characters "sport top of the line hair styles" Manga Recon's Ken Haley praised the character designs, saying they are interesting and "contemporary with a vague hint of industrial/goth at times" Green believes that Miwa can "draw an effecting figure". Miwa's art has a "specificity" so the difference between how certain characters hold themselves can be seen and a "rightness" that allows movement in the series look "genuine".
