= Kaze ga Gotoku =

Japanese manga series

風が如く
- Manga
- Written by: Hideyuki Yonehara
- Published by: Akita Shoten
- Magazine: Weekly Shōnen Champion
- Original run: 2008 – 2010
- Volumes: 8

Kaze ga Gotoku (風が如く; lit. 'Like the Wind') is a Japanese manga series by Hideyuki Yonehara (米原 秀幸, Yonehara Hideyuki). It was serialized in Weekly Shōnen Champion from 2008 to 2010.

== Story ==
Goemon Ishikawa, the king of thieves from the feudal era, learns that a treasure is being transported from the Imperial Palace to the Kamiyama mansion: an ancient artifact called "moon's melody box" (月詠みの箱). Surprised by the extreme measures taken by the guards of this treasure, he aches to steal it. The box can grant one wish to whoever possesses the box once a year. However, it is not easy to steal and once it is opened, it will be harder to deal with its unusual contents.

== Characters ==
=== Goemon's party ===
- Ishikawa Goemon (石川 五右衛門) – The amazing thief with amazing powers like "the thunder scream" and "the wind dance". He is the son of the Chinese master So Souken and speaks in an odd American dialect.
- Kaguya (かぐや) – She is trapped in the "Moon's melody box" and holds a mysterious power. She is 704-year-old, yet she eternally resembles a 5-year-old girl. Her motif is "Princess Kaguya" (かぐや姫, Kaguya-hime). She is the main character in The Tale of the Bamboo Cutter.
- Tokietsu Sōta (時越 速太) – He fell from a black hole when Kaguya granted Goemon his wish. He is a young boy from the year 2009.
- Tanaka Kintarō (田中 金太郎) – A progeny of Kintarō (Sakata no Kintoki). He is 16 years old and has dreadlocks and possesses herculean strength.
- Sakata-san (坂田さん) – Kintarō's partner, who is a giant panda.

=== Oda clan ===
- Oda Nobunaga (織田 信長) – A fearsome Sengoku period warlord called "The Satan" (魔王 Maō). He is the Oda clan's leader.
- Shibata Katsuie (柴田 勝家) – A general of the Oda clan. He is part—human and part-ogre.
- Takigawa Kazumasu (滝川 一益) – A general of the Oda clan. He is a ninja of Kōga-ryū.
- Maeda Toshiie (前田 利家) – A general of the Oda clan.
- Akechi Mitsuhide (明智 光秀) – A general of the Oda clan.
- Hashiba Hideyoshi (羽柴 秀吉) – A general of the Oda clan.

=== Other characters ===
- Saitō Dōsan (斎藤 道三) – The Saitō clan's leader who can spout fire.
- Izumono Okuni (出雲 阿国) – The amazing thief known as "Lady Panther". She is 17 years old.
- Momochi Sandayū (百地 三太夫) – Iga-ryū ninja leader and Goemon's teacher.

== Manga volumes ==
- Shōnen Champion Comics Label
1. 米原秀幸 (2009-03-06). 風が如く 1 (in Japanese). Vol. 1. Japan: 秋田書店. ISBN 978-4-253-21531-2.
2. 米原秀幸 (2009-05-08). 風が如く 2 (in Japanese). Vol. 2. Japan: 秋田書店. ISBN 978-4-253-21532-9.
3. 米原秀幸 (2009-07-08). 風が如く 3 (in Japanese). Vol. 3. Japan: 秋田書店. ISBN 978-4-253-21533-6.
4. 米原秀幸 (2009-09-08). 風が如く 4 (in Japanese). Vol. 4. Japan: 秋田書店. ISBN 978-4-253-21534-3.
5. 米原秀幸 (2009-12-08). 風が如く 5 (in Japanese). Vol. 5. Japan: 秋田書店. ISBN 978-4-253-21535-0.
6. 米原秀幸 (2010-02-08). 風が如く 6 (in Japanese). Vol. 6. Japan: 秋田書店. ISBN 978-4-253-21536-7.
7. 米原秀幸 (2010-04-08). 風が如く 7 (in Japanese). Vol. 7. Japan: 秋田書店. ISBN 978-4-253-21537-4.
8. 米原秀幸 (2010-05-07). 風が如く 8 (in Japanese). Vol. 8. Japan: 秋田書店. ISBN 978-4-253-21538-1.
