= Hideyuki Yonehara =

Japanese manga artist

Hideyuki Yonehara 米原秀幸
- Born: October 2, 1967 (age 59) Tokyo
- Area: Manga artist
- Notable works: Full Ahead! Coco; Udauda Yatteru Hima wa Nei

Hideyuki Yonehara (米原秀幸, Yonehara Hideyuki) is a Japanese manga artist whose works include Udauda Yatteru Hima wa Nei and Full Ahead! Coco. Most of his works were featured in Akita Shoten's Weekly Shōnen Champion magazine and published by Shonen Champion Comics.

== Works ==
Name	Year	Notes	Refs
Springs	1989	Debut work, initially in Young Champion; Published by Shonen Champion Comics in 1999, 1 volume	
Garakuta	1990	Series of short stories, serialized in Weekly Shonen Champion; Published by Shonen Champion Comics in 2002, 1 volume	
Legend of Dou (ja:箕輪道伝説, Minowa dōdensetsu)	1990–92	Serialized in Weekly Shonen Champion; Published by Shonen Champion Comics, 8 volumes	
Udauda Yatteru Hima wa Nei (ja:ウダウダやってるヒマはねェ!)	1992–96	Serialized in Weekly Shonen Champion; Published by Shonen Champion Comics, 22 volumes; Also Akita Top Comics, 3 volumes	
Chocolate Blues (チョコレートぶるーす)	1994–2000	One-shots, originally published in Monthly Shonen Champion; Published by Shonen Champion Comics, 1 volume	
Full Ahead! Coco (ja:フルアヘッド!ココ, Furuaheddo! Koko)	1997–2002	Published by Shonen Champion Comics, 30 volumes; Also New edition, 19 volumes	
Switch	2002–04	Serialized in Weekly Shonen Champion; Published by Shonen Champion Comics, 13 volumes	
Hae! BunBun (ja:南風!BunBun, Hae! BunBun)	2005–06	Serialized in Weekly Shonen Champion; Published by Shonen Champion Comics, 4 volumes	
Dämons	2006–08	Serialized in Weekly Shonen Champion; Original story by Osamu Tezuka, published by Shonen Champion Comics, 13 volumes	
Kaze ga Gotoku	2008–10	Serialized in Weekly Shonen Champion; Published by Shonen Champion Comics, 8 volumes	
Houdou Gang Absurd! (ja:報道ギャング ABSURD!, Hōdō gyangu Absurd!)	2010–13	Published by Play Comics, 5 volumes	
Cold Rush	2011	Story by Hideyuki Yonehara, illustrations by Yuki Kumada; Originally published in Princess Gold magazine Published by Akita Comics Deluxe, 1 volume First work in a shojo magazine.	
Vision Noa	2011	Serialized in Young Champion; Published by Shonen Champion Comics, 4 volumes	
Rock & Gem	2012–14	Published by Play Comics, 2 volumes	
Sunset Rose (サンセットローズ)	2013–Present	Serialized in Bessatsu Shonen Champion; Published by Shonen Champion Comics, 16 volumes	
Dragon Seekers (ドラゴンシーカーズ)	2015–Present	Serialized in Gekkan Shonen Champion; Published by Shonen Champion Comics, 4 volumes	
