= List of Sorcerous Stabber Orphen (2020 TV series) episodes =

The 2020 Sorcerous Stabber Orphen anime television series is based on the light novel series of the same name written by Yoshinobu Akita and illustrated by Yuuya Kusaka. The anime remake is animated by Studio Deen and directed by Takayuki Hamana, with Reiko Yoshida handling series composition, and Takahiko Yoshida designing the characters. Showtaro Morikubo reprised his role as Orphen, while the rest of the characters had new voice actors. The 2020 remake was commemorated to celebrate the 25th anniversary of the anime series. It was initially set to premiere in 2019, but was rescheduled to premiere on January 7 to March 31, 2020, on AT-X, BS Fuji, Tokyo MX, and Wowow. The opening theme is "Calling U" performed by buzz★Vibes, and the ending theme is "Unpredictable Days" (予測不能Days, "Yosoku Funō Deizu") performed by Mai Fuchigami.

Funimation has licensed the series for a simuldub.

An unaired OVA episode was bundled with the remake's second Blu-ray box set, which released on May 8, 2020.

A second season of the 2020 remake was announced with the title of Sorcerous Stabber Orphen: Battle of Kimluck. It aired from January 20 to March 31, 2021. The opening theme is "Light of Justice" performed by Showtaro Morikubo while the ending theme is "Marionette Coup d'État" (操り人形(マリオネット)クーデター, "Marionetto Kū Detā") performed by Mai Fuchigami.

A third season was announced on September 26, 2022, titled Sorcerous Stabber Orphen: Chaos in Urbanrama. Kenji Konuta replaced Reiko Yoshida as the scriptwriter. It aired from January 18 to April 5, 2023. The opening theme song is "Hysteric Caravan" by Showtaro Morikubo, while the ending theme song is "Fantastic Partner" (ファンタジック・パートナー, Fantajikku Pātonā) by Mai Fuchigami.

A fourth season was announced on January 9, 2023, titled Sorcerous Stabber Orphen: Sanctuary Arc. It aired from April 12 to June 28, 2023. The opening theme is "Motive Rain" by Showtaro Morikubo while the ending theme is "Shūen no Destiny" (Destiny of the End) by Mai Fuchigami.

== Series overview ==
Season	Episodes	Originally released	
Season	Episodes	First released	Last released
1	13 + OVA	January 7, 2020	March 31, 2020
2	11	January 20, 2021	March 31, 2021
3	12	January 18, 2023	April 5, 2023
4	12	April 12, 2023	June 28, 2023

== Episode list ==
=== Season 1 (2020) ===
No. overall	No. in season	Title (Note: All English titles are taken from Funimation.)	Directed by	Written by	Original release date
1	1	"The Vestige of the Past"; Transliteration: "Tsuioku no Yobigoe" (Japanese: 追憶の呼び声)	Takashi Ando	Reiko Yoshida	January 7, 2020
2	2	"The Tower of Fangs"; Transliteration: "Kiba no Tō" (Japanese: 牙の塔)	Shigeru Yamazaki	Reiko Yoshida	January 14, 2020
3	3	"Heed My Call, Beast"; Transliteration: "Waga yobigoe ni kotaeyo shishi" (Japanese: 我が呼び声に応えよ獣)	Toshiyuki Sone	Reiko Yoshida	January 21, 2020
4	4	"The Chaos Witch and the Successor of the Razor's Edge"; Transliteration: "Tenma no Majo to hagane no Kōkei" (Japanese: 天魔の魔女と鋼の後継)	Hiromichi Matano	Mariko Kunizawa	January 28, 2020
5	5	"Deep Dragon"; Transliteration: "Dīpu・Doragon" (Japanese: ディープ・ドラゴン)	Teru Ishii	Koki Hirota	February 4, 2020
6	6	"Forest Maiden"; Transliteration: ""Mori" no Miko" (Japanese: ≪森≫の巫女)	Takashi Ando	Koki Hirota	February 11, 2020
7	7	"Gather In My Forest, Wolves"; Transliteration: "Waga mori ni tsudoe ōkami" (Japanese: 我が森に集え狼)	Shigeru Yamazaki	Koki Hirota	February 18, 2020
8	8	"An Unexpected Assassin"; Transliteration: "Tōtotsu no Ansatsusha" (Japanese: 唐突の暗殺者)	Toshiyuki Sone	Takaaki Suzuki	February 25, 2020
9	9	"Ghost from the Past"; Transliteration: "Kako no Bōrei" (Japanese: 過去の亡霊)	Hideya Ito	Takaaki Suzuki	March 3, 2020
10	10	"Make My Past Disappear, Assassin"; Transliteration: "Waga kako wo kese ansatsusha" (Japanese: 我が過去を消せ暗殺者)	Naoki Murata	Takaaki Suzuki	March 10, 2020
11	11	"The Uoar Class"; Transliteration: "Uōru kyōshitsu" (Japanese: ウオール教室)	Yuki Morita	Reiko Yoshida	March 17, 2020
12	12	"Death Keening"; Transliteration: "Shi no Zekkyō" (Japanese: 死の絶叫)	Shigeru Yamazaki	Reiko Yoshida	March 24, 2020
13	13	"Come to My Tower, Successor"; Transliteration: "Waga tō ni kitare kōkeisha" (Japanese: 我が塔に来たれ後継者)	Toshiyuki Sone	Reiko Yoshida	March 31, 2020
14	OVA	"Celestial Artifacts"; Transliteration: "Tennin no Isan" (Japanese: 天人の遺産)	Shunji Yoshida	Mariko Kunizawa	May 8, 2020

=== Season 2: Battle of Kimluck (2021) ===
No. overall	No. in season	Title	Directed by	Written by	Original release date
15	1	"Say My Will, Demon King"; Transliteration: "Waga Ishi o Tsutaeyo Maō" (Japanese: 我が遺志を伝えよ魔王)	Shunji Yoshida	Mitsutaka Hirota	January 20, 2021
16	2	"His Own Angel and Devil"; Transliteration: "Kare ni Totte no Tenshi to Akuma" (Japanese: 彼にとっての天使と悪魔)	Toshiyuki Sone	Mitsutaka Hirota	January 27, 2021
17	3	"The City That Rejects Sorcerers"; Transliteration: "Majutsushi o Kobamu Machi" (Japanese: 魔術士を拒む街)	Naoki Murata	Reiko Yoshida	February 3, 2021
18	4	"Sister Istersiva"; Transliteration: "Shisutā Isutāshiba" (Japanese: シスター・イスターシバ)	Shigeru Yamazaki	Reiko Yoshida	February 10, 2021
19	5	"Shed Bloody Tears, Holy City"; Transliteration: "Waga Seito o Nurase Ketsurui" (Japanese: 我が聖都を濡らせ血涙)	Takayuki Hamana	Kana Yamada	February 17, 2021
20	6	"We of Holy Death"; Transliteration: "Shi no Seinaru ka na" (Japanese: 死の聖なるかな)	Itadashi Kite	Takaaki Suzuki	February 24, 2021
21	7	"That Sorcery Will Kill Him"; Transliteration: "Sono Majutsu ga Kare o Korosu to" (Japanese: その魔術が彼を殺すと)	Shunji Yoshida	Takaaki Suzuki	March 3, 2021
22	8	"The Hall of the Great Poet"; Transliteration: "Shisei no Ma" (Japanese: 詩聖の間)	Toshiyuki Sone	Takaaki Suzuki	March 10, 2021
23	9	"The Death Instructors"; Transliteration: "Shi no Kyōshi-tachi" (Japanese: 死の教師たち)	Takatoshi Suzuki	Reiko Yoshida	March 17, 2021
24	10	"The Only Thing That Can Kill Her"; Transliteration: "Kanojo o Koroseru Yuiitsu no" (Japanese: 彼女を殺せる唯一の)	Mana Uchiyama	Reiko Yoshida	March 24, 2021
25	11	"Draw Your Bow at My God, Apostate"; Transliteration: "Waga Kami ni Yumihike Haiyaku-sha" (Japanese: 我が神に弓ひけ背約者)	Shigeru Yamazaki	Reiko Yoshida	March 31, 2021

=== Season 3: Chaos in Urbanrama (2023) ===
No. overall	No. in season	Title	Directed by	Written by	Original release date
26	1	"Sink into My Dreams, Paradise"; Transliteration: "Waga Yume ni Shizume Rrakuen" (Japanese: 我が夢に沈め楽園)	Matsuo Asami	Kenji Kobuta	January 18, 2023
27	2	"The Ghosts of the Execution Grounds"; Transliteration: "Shokeijō no Bōreitachi" (Japanese: 処刑場の亡霊たち)	Shigeru Yamazaki	Kenji Kobuta	January 25, 2023
28	3	"Guide My Fate, Magic Sword"; Transliteration: "Waga Unmei Michibike ma Ken" (Japanese: 我が運命導け魔剣)	Mizuki Kobayashi	Takaaki Suzuki	February 1, 2023
29	4	"The Sword Princess of Nashwater"; Transliteration: "Nasshuwōta no Ken Hime" (Japanese: ナッシュウォータの剣姫)	Toshiyuki Sone	Hana Yamada	February 8, 2023
30	5	"The Crest of the Insects Sword"; Transliteration: "Mushi no Monshō no Ken" (Japanese: 蟲の紋章の剣)	Takahiro Tanaka	Toshimitsu Takeuchi	February 15, 2023
31	6	"Lay Claim to My Heart, Devil"; Transliteration: "Waga Kokoro Motomeyo Akuma" (Japanese: 我が心求めよ悪魔)	Matsuo Asami	Mariko Kunizawa	February 22, 2023
32	7	"Shine Down Upon My Ambush, Moonlight"; Transliteration: "Waga Kishū Terase Gekkō" (Japanese: 我が奇襲照らせ月光)	Yoshihisa Matsumoto & Naoki Murata	Hana Yamada	March 1, 2023
33	8	"The Green Gem Armor"; Transliteration: "Midori Hōseki no Yoroi" (Japanese: 緑宝石の鎧)	Andong Daei	Takaaki Suzuki	March 8, 2023
34	9	"The Messenger from the Imminent Domain"; Transliteration: "Saisekkinryō Kara no Shisha" (Japanese: 最接近領からの使者)	Yu Yabuuchi	Toshimitsu Takeuchi	March 15, 2023
35	10	"Melancholy of the Red Dragon"; Transliteration: "Reddo・Doragon no Yūutsu" (Japanese: レッド・ドラゴンの憂鬱)	Takashi Ando	Mariko Kunizawa	March 22, 2023
36	11	"The Most Powerful White Sorcerer"; Transliteration: "Saikyō no Shiro Majutsushi" (Japanese: 最強の白魔術士)	Toshiyuki Sone	Kenji Kobuta	March 29, 2023
37	12	"Engulf My Desire, Verdure"; Transliteration: "Waga Zetsubō Tsutsume Midori" (Japanese: 我が絶望つつめ緑)	Shigeru Yamazaki	Kenji Kobuta	April 5, 2023

=== Season 4: Doom of Dragon's Sanctuary (2023) ===
No. overall	No. in season	Title	Directed by	Written by	Original release date
38	1	"Dance Across My Battlefield, Visitors"; Transliteration: "Waga Senjō ni Odore Raihōsha" (Japanese: 我が戦場に踊れ来訪者)	Matsuo Asami	Hana Yamada	April 12, 2023
39	2	"Childman Network"; Transliteration: "Chairudoman・Nettowāku" (Japanese: チャイルドマン・ネットワーク)	Mizuki Kobayashi	Takaaki Suzuki	April 19, 2023
40	3	"Echo Through My Garden, Gunshots"; Transliteration: "Waga Niwa ni Hibike Jūsei" (Japanese: 我が庭に響け銃声)	Yu Yabuuchi	Mariko Kunizawa	April 26, 2023
41	4	"The Assassin in Holy Robes"; Transliteration: "Hijirifuku no Ansatsusha" (Japanese: 聖服の暗殺者)	Naoki Murata	Toshimitsu Takeuchi	May 3, 2023
42	5	"Lord Almagest"; Transliteration: "Ryōshu Arumagesuto" (Japanese: 領主アルマゲスト)	Masashi Okubo	Kenji Kobuta	May 10, 2023
43	6	"Wander My Mansion, Falsehood"; Transliteration: "Waga Kan ni Samayoe Kyozō" (Japanese: 我が館にさまよえ虚像)	Shigeru Yamazaki	Kenji Kobuta	May 17, 2023
44	7	"The Demon of the Royal Capital and the Thirteen Apostles"; Transliteration: "O Miyako no Majin to Jū-san Shito" (Japanese: 王都の魔人と十三使徒)	Andong Daiei	Hana Yamada	May 24, 2023
45	8	"Ayrmankar Barrier"; Transliteration: "Airumankā Kekkai" (Japanese: アイルマンカー結界)	Yuri Hagiwara	Kenji Kobuta	May 31, 2023
46	9	"The Second World-Seeing Tower"; Transliteration: "Dai ni Sekaizutō" (Japanese: 第二世界図塔)	Yu Yabuuchi	Mariko Kunizawa	June 7, 2023
47	10	"Night Knocker's Ambition"; Transliteration: "Naito Nokkā no Yabō" (Japanese: ナイトノッカーの野望)	Matsuo Asami	Kenji Kobuta	June 14, 2023
48	11	"Swing Wide In My Sanctuary, Gates"; Transliteration: "Waga Seīki ni Ake Tobira" (Japanese: 我が聖域に開け扉)	Naoki Murata	Kenji Kobuta	June 21, 2023
49	12	"The End of Kiesalhima"; Transliteration: "Kiesaruhima no Shūtan" (Japanese: キエサルヒマの終端)	Shigeru Yamazaki	Kenji Kobuta	June 28, 2023

== See also ==
- List of Sorcerous Stabber Orphen (1998 TV series) episodes
