= Hideyuki Akaza =

Japanese urologist

Hideyuki Akaza (赤座 英之, Akaza Hideyuki) is a Japanese urologist and an author of more than 17 peer-reviewed articles. He graduated from the University of Tokyo and became a professor in urological oncology there. He also served as a professor emeritus at the University of Tsukuba and was a President of both the Asia Pacific Society of Urological Oncology and the 20th Asia Pacific Cancer Conference. From 2005 to 2009 he was a member of both the Japanese Urological Association and the Japan Society of Clinical Oncology in which he started participating in 2006.

His 2004 article in Cancer Research has been cited by 213 papers in Google Scholar.
