= Hunter × Hunter (disambiguation) =

Hunter × Hunter is a Japanese manga series written and illustrated by Yoshihiro Togashi.

Hunter × Hunter or Hunter Hunter may also refer to:

- Hunter × Hunter (1999 TV series), an adaptation by Nippon Animation
- Hunter × Hunter (2011 TV series), an adaptation by Madhouse
- Hunter × Hunter: Phantom Rouge, a 2013 film adaptation
- Hunter × Hunter: The Last Mission, a 2013 film adaptation

== See also ==
- Hunter Hunter (film), a 2020 Canadian-American film.
