= Hunter × Hunter: Nen × Impact =

2025 video game

- Promotional art
- Developers: Bushiroad; Eighting
- Publishers: JP: Bushiroad; WW: Arc System Works
- Composers: Shinji Hosoe; Ayako Saso; Takahiro Eguchi; Masashi Yano
- Series: Hunter × Hunter
- Platforms: Nintendo Switch; PlayStation 5; Windows; Arcade
- Release: Switch, PS5, Windows; July 17, 2025; Arcade; October 15, 2025
- Genre: Fighting
- Modes: Single-player, multiplayer
- Arcade system: exA-Arcadia

Hunter × Hunter: Nen × Impact (Note: Japanese: ハンター×ハンター ネン×インパクト, Hepburn: Hantā × Hantā Nen × Inpakuto) is a fighting game developed by Bushiroad and Eighting. It was released by Bushiroad in Japan and Arc System Works worldwide on July 17, 2025, for the Nintendo Switch, PlayStation 5 and Windows.

Based on the Hunter × Hunter franchise, the game centres around three-on-three tag team style fights, where the player picks a team of three playable characters with unique abilities taken from the franchise, to fight a CPU or human opponent with their own team of three characters.

== Gameplay ==
The gameplay centres around three-on-three battles against opponents either controlled by the CPU or by other players through either local or online multiplayer and is reminiscent of other games developed by Eighting namely Ultimate Marvel vs. Capcom 3 and Tatsunoko vs. Capcom. Players can pick three characters who they will take into battle, with the winner being the one who depletes all three of their opponent's fighters. Players can switch their playable fighters out at any time and can call upon fighters who are not in play to execute assists attacks. The rush button allows players to perform stronger combo attacks, though this ability has a cooldown period. Each character also has an "Nen Arts" meter that fills up through executing combos, which can be used to perform powerful one-time attacks that are unique to each character.

Single-player game modes include a story mode that allows players to reenact battles from the source material against CPU opponents, which also have additional objectives such as winning in a certain timeframe or executing a specific combo. Training mode allows players to hone their skills whilst Single mode utilizes the "Heaven's Arena" location from the source material as a series of increasingly more challenging CPU fighters, with each character having their own set of challenges. Completing these challenges provides unlockable content such as player icons and Greed Island Cards.

Multiplayer game modes include Free Battle Mode for fighting human opponents in local multiplayer, alongside online battles with user friends. Ranked matchmaking is also included for players who want to test their skills in highly competitive matches online.

== Characters ==
The base game includes 16 playable characters. 4 additional characters were later released through a season pass. The characters are voiced in Japanese by the cast of Madhouse's 2011 Hunter × Hunter anime series.

Base Roster

- Gon Freecss
- Killua Zoldyck
- Leorio Paradinight
- Kurapika
- Hisoka Morow
- Isaac Netero
- Biscuit "Bisky" Krueger
- Machi Komacine
- Uvogin
- Chrollo Lucilfer
- Feitan Portor
- Meruem
- Genthru
- Razor
- Morel Mackernasey
- Kite

Season Pass 1

- Neferpitou
- Phinks Magcub
- Shizuku Murasaki
- Zeno Zoldyck

== Development and release ==
The game was first announced at Jump Festa 2023 on December 15, with the first teaser trailer revealing the game's name as Hunter × Hunter: Nen × Impact releasing in January 2024. A demo was available to play at Evo Japan 2024 event on April 27, and again for Evo Japan 2025 from May 9 to May 11. The game was further demoed for Bushiroad EXPO 2025, a series of exhibitions held at various fan conventions across the world, including Taipei International Comics and Animation Festival (6–10 February), Comic Con Mumbai (April 12–13), Comic Frontier 20 in Jakarta Indonesia (May 24–25) and at the Gateway Mall in Quezon City, Philippines (June 7–8). One more exhibition is planned for TableCon Quest 2025 in Singapore (August 23–24).

The game was set to be released in 2024, but was soon delayed to July 17, 2025, due to the implementation of rollback netcode, a mechanism that reduces lag during online matches.

In November 2024, the Australian Classification Board refused the game classification, preemptively banning the game from sale in the country due to "a scene of a visual depiction of implied sexual violence, where an adult male exposes himself to persons under the age of 18 years".

== Reception ==
Reception

Aggregate score
Aggregator	Score
Metacritic	(PS5) 53/100

Review scores
Publication	Score
Gamekult	50
IGN	55
Push Square	50
Gamezebo	70%

The game was not well received.

In Japan, the game got to #10 in the sales charts, having sold 3174 copies.
