= J-Stars Victory VS =

2014 video game

- The cover of the Japanese PlayStation 3 version, featuring characters from each of the represented series
- Developer: Spike Chunsoft
- Publisher: Bandai Namco Entertainment
- Director: Tairi Kikuchi
- Producer: Hiroyuki Kaneko
- Programmers: Kengo Ito; Takashi Yamaguchi; Yosuke Yoshida; Hiroki Shimizu; Yuji Ishiwatari; Kohei Hieda; Toshiaki Kanazawa; Kiyoshi Nagata; Saburo Matsuoka; Koichi Kuroki
- Writers: Keita Nakamura; Takahito Sekimoto; Asuka Konno
- Composers: Yasuharu Takanashi; Hiromi Mizutani
- Series: Shōnen Jump
- Platforms: PlayStation 3, PlayStation Vita, PlayStation 4
- Release: J-Stars Victory VS: JP: March 19, 2014; J-Stars Victory VS+: EU: June 26, 2015; NA: June 30, 2015
- Genre: Fighting
- Modes: Single-player, multiplayer

J-Stars Victory VS (ジェイスターズ ビクトリーバーサス, Jei Sutāzu Bikutorī Bāsasu) is a crossover fighting video game that combines the universes of several Weekly Shōnen Jump manga series, including former series and some that have been transferred to other magazines. It was released in Japan by Bandai Namco Entertainment on March 19, 2014, for the PlayStation 3 and PlayStation Vita in celebration of Weekly Shōnen Jump's 45th anniversary. It was re-released for western territories as J-Stars Victory VS+ for the PlayStation 4, PlayStation 3, and PlayStation Vita, with an additional Arcade Mode for the international release. It was released in Europe on June 26, 2015, and in North America on June 30, 2015. A follow-up game, Jump Force, released on February 15, 2019, to tie in with the 50th anniversary of Weekly Shōnen Jump.

== Gameplay ==
J-Stars Victory VS lets up to four players battle it out against one another using a gameplay and graphical style similar to those of Dragon Ball: Zenkai Battle Royale. Fighters can move and fight in all directions on one of twelve 3D battle fields, each based on a location from a different Jump series. Players should learn the lay of the land and formulate a battle plan with a character suited to it.

A defeated character comes back after a set amount of time has passed. To win the battle, all three sections of the WIN gauge at the top of the screen have to be filled; the gauge fills one section each time an opponent is defeated. Fighters can use regular attacks, power attacks, area-based attacks, and finishing moves. Regular attacks are the main part of the battle, and all combos begin with them. Power attacks leave the user open, but they have a big impact if they connect and their power can be increased by charging them up. Area-based attacks allow for hitting opponents over a wide area. By using different techniques, the player can lead his or her team to victory; learning each character's different power, range, and effects is the first step towards being unbeatable.

Playable game modes include "J-Adventure", a multi-player story mode divided between four campaigns in which players explore a world map, battle various opponents, and collect in-game cards to power up their characters; "Victory Road", a multi-player battle mode in which players must complete certain predetermined objectives during battles; and a free-battle mode which supports up to two players in local offline play and up to four players via online multiplayer. An additional single-player Arcade Mode is exclusive to J-Stars Victory VS+.

== Plot ==
The game's story mode, "J-Adventure", takes place in Jump World, an amalgamation of the different characters' universes. As the story begins, each of the characters is preparing for the Jump Battle Tournament, a fighting competition organized by the God of Jump World, who promises to grant the wishes of the team that wins. The narrative is split between four different arcs, each focusing on a different team exploring Jump World, gathering more teammates to compete, and working to achieve their own personal goals. The Dynamic Arc focuses on Monkey D Luffy, Portgas D. Ace and Seiya; the Hope Arc on Naruto Uzumaki, Yusuke Urameshi, and Gon Freecss; the Investigation Arc on Toriko, Zebra, and Goku; and the Pursuit Arc on Ichigo Kurosaki, Tatsumi Oga, and Hiei.

To progress, each team defeats tournament examiners to acquire upgrades for their ships so they can reach the arena; they also acquire additional allies in the wake of a mysterious enemy that can possess them. When one of the teams wins the tournament, the God of Jump World reveals the true purpose of the competition: to gather warriors to combat the Dark Phantoms, an evil force capable of impersonating strong fighters. Using the keys of Effort, Bravery and Friendship, the heroes travel to the Dark Phantoms' world and seal them away.

With the Dark Phantoms defeated, all the heroes are offered a wish. They collectively wish to have another tournament so they can fight again and get stronger. Granting it, the God of Jump World rewards the heroes with a feast.

== Characters ==
The game features 52 characters from 32 different Jump series. 39 of these characters are playable, while 13 of them can be summoned by players to provide support.

=== Playable characters ===
Assassination Classroom

- Koro-sensei

Beelzebub

- Tatsumi Oga paired with Baby Beel

Bleach

- Ichigo Kurosaki
- Sousuke Aizen

Bobobo-bo Bo-bobo

- Bobobo-bo Bo-bobo paired with Don Patch

Chinyūki: Tarō to Yukai na Nakama-tachi

- Taro Yamada

Dr. Slump

- Arale Norimaki paired with Gatchan

Dragon Ball

- Son Goku
- Vegeta
- Frieza

Fist of the North Star

- Kenshiro
- Raoh

Gintama

- Gintoki Sakata

Hell Teacher Nūbē

- Meisuke Nueno (Nūbē)

Hunter × Hunter

- Gon Freecss
- Killua Zoldyck

JoJo's Bizarre Adventure

- Jonathan Joestar
- Joseph Joestar

Kochira Katsushika-ku Kameari Kōen-mae Hashutsujo

- Kankichi Ryotsu

Medaka Box

- Medaka Kurokami

Naruto

- Naruto Uzumaki
- Sasuke Uchiha
- Madara Uchiha

One Piece

- Monkey D. Luffy
- Portgas D. Ace
- Boa Hancock
- Akainu

Reborn!

- Tsuna Sawada paired with Reborn

Rurouni Kenshin

- Himura Kenshin
- Shishio Makoto

Saint Seiya

- Pegasus Seiya

Sakigake!! Otokojuku

- Momotaro Tsurugi

The Disastrous Life of Saiki K.

- Kusuo Saiki

Tottemo! Luckyman

- Luckyman

Toriko

- Toriko
- Zebra

YuYu Hakusho

- Yusuke Urameshi
- Hiei
- Younger Toguro

=== Support characters ===
Bleach

- Rukia Kuchiki

D.Gray-man

- Allen Walker

Gintama

- Kagura and Sadaharu

Haikyū!!

- Shōyō Hinata

Hunter × Hunter

- Hisoka

Kuroko's Basketball

- Tetsuya Kuroko

Medaka Box

- Misogi Kumagawa

Neuro: Supernatural Detective

- Neuro Nōgami

Nisekoi

- Chitoge Kirisaki

Pyu to Fuku! Jaguar

- Jaguar Junichi

Sakigake!! Otokojuku

- Heihachi Edajima

Sket Dance

- Bossun, Himeko, and Switch

To Love Ru

- Lala Satalin Deviluke

In addition to these characters, Gin Tama's Shinpachi Shimura can be heard providing commentary to some of Gintoki's battle actions and pre-fight dialogue. Other characters from each series make non-playable cameo appearances in the game's story mode.

== Development ==
The game was first announced in December 2012 under the title of Project Versus J, in Weekly Shōnen Jump's second issue of 2013. It was made to commemorate the 45th anniversary of Jump, and has been presented as the "ultimate Jump game". J-Stars Victory VS features characters and settings from various Jump manga, both past and present, ranging from older properties such as Dragon Ball, YuYu Hakusho, and Kochira Katsushika-ku Kameari Kōen-mae Hashutsujo, current long-running series such as Naruto, Bleach, One Piece, and JoJo's Bizarre Adventure, to newer series such as Medaka Box, Assassination Classroom, and Beelzebub.

The first three characters that were unveiled and used to promote the game were Son Goku, Monkey D. Luffy, and Toriko. Also in December, it was announced that fans could vote for some of the characters that they want to be included in J-Stars Victory VS. Several other characters were announced over the following months via the "Weekly Shōnen Jump" and "V Jump" magazines, as well as characters' transformations which would be available as special moves. The game's adventure mode also features other non-player characters from the various series.

Producer Koji Nakajima stated that getting the rights to the multiple franchises owned Shueisha was not hard, but rather determining which actions the characters make in the game was the most difficult part. Since some of the characters do not fight in their series, their actions and motions had to be approved by each licensee after many negotiations. He also stated that he originally hoped to include a much larger roster of characters.

A limited edition "Anison" version of the game includes the theme songs from the player characters' television series, such as "Cha-La Head-Cha-La" and "We Are!", as music that can be played in-game during battles. The game's own theme song is "Fighting Stars", performed by Hironobu Kageyama, Hiroshi Kitadani, and Akira Kushida.

=== J-Stars Victory VS+ ===
In December 2014, Bandai Namco announced that the game would be released in North America and Europe under the name J-Stars Victory VS+. Released in summer 2015, VS+ retains the original Japanese voice-over track and adds an additional single-player Arcade Mode not present in the original release. VS+ also marks the game's first appearance on the PlayStation 4, in addition to the PlayStation 3 and PlayStation Vita as with its predecessor. The new release features an identical character roster to the original, while also incorporating game balance adjustments based on feedback from Japanese players. A J-Stars Victory VS+ Compendium art book and set of PlayStation themes were offered as a pre-order bonus.

== Reception ==
Reception

Aggregate score
Aggregator	Score
Metacritic	PS4: 61/100; VITA (VS+): 74/100

Review score
Publication	Score
Famitsu	8/10, 8/10, 8/10, 8/10

Following its first week of release, the PS3 version of the game sold 118,240 units in Japan while the Vita version sold 97,821 units. Japanese sales tracker Media Create reported that the PS3 version of the game sold through 86.55% of its shipment, while the Vita version sold through 89.25% of its shipment. For a multiplatform release, the Vita version did well, Media Create says.

Richard Eisenbeis of Kotaku praised the game's roster for taking from many different series and how each character has a unique fighting style. However, he said that despite this each character plays the same, with strong, weak and knockdown attacks, and titled his review "J-Stars Victory VS Gets Real Old Real Fast". He also noted the lack of a meaningful plot in the story mode.

The western PlayStation 4 release has a score of 61 on Metacritic while the PlayStation Vita version has a 74; both indicating mixed or average reviews. IGN awarded it a score of 5.0 out of 10, saying "Despite a great cast of characters, J-Stars Victory Vs.+ fails to leverage their charm on or off the battlefield".
