= Kanako Mitsuhashi =

Japanese actress and voice actress

- 三橋 加奈子
- Born: January 10, 1978 (age 47); Yokohama, Kanagawa Prefecture, Japan
- Occupations: Actress; voice actress
- Years active: 1996–present
- Height: 161 cm (5 ft 3 in)
- Spouse: Kōji Yusa (m. 2007; div. 2012)
- Children: 1

Kanako Mitsuhashi (三橋 加奈子, Mitsuhashi Kanako, January 10, 1978) is a Japanese actress and voice actress from the Hodogaya-ku ward of Yokohama. Mitsuhashi is best known for her roles as Killua Zoldyck from Hunter × Hunter, Rico from Gunslinger Girl, and Suzuka Asahina from Suzuka. She was married to fellow voice actor Kōji Yusa. However, Yusa publicly announced their divorce in 2012 on his radio station.

== Filmography ==
Leading roles indicated in bold.

=== Voice over roles ===
==== Animation ====
- Absolute Boy - **Miki Miyama**
- Ballad of a Shinigami - Tomato Fujiwara
- Fuuka - Suzuka Asahina
- Gunslinger Girl - **Rico**
- Hatsumei Boy Kanipan - **Milk**
- Hunter × Hunter (1999) - **Killua Zoldyck**
- Hyper Police - Samantha Grey
- Kero Kero Chime - Suu
- Kochikame - **Naoko Seisho**
- Star Ocean EX - Leon
- Sugar Sugar Rune - Jun Mitsumura
- Suzuka - **Suzuka Asahina**
- The Prince of Tennis - Kouhei Tanaka

==== Original video animation ====
- Agent Aika - Black
- Hunter × Hunter - Killua Zoldyck
- Hunter × Hunter: Greed Island - Killua Zoldyck
- Hunter × Hunter: Greed Island Final - Killua Zoldyck
