= Yoshihisa Hirano =

Japanese composer (born 1971)

Yoshihisa Hirano 平野義久
- Born: December 7, 1971 (age 54); Wakayama Prefecture, Japan
- Genres: Contemporary Music; Soundtrack; Classical; Experimental Music
- Occupations: Composer; Arranger; Conductor
- Label: VAP
- Website: www.yoshihisahirano.com

Yoshihisa Hirano (平野 義久, Hirano Yoshihisa; born December 7, 1971) is a Japanese composer and arranger. He is best known for composing the scores for anime series, such as Death Note, Hunter × Hunter (2011), Hajime no Ippo and Edens Zero. He has also made the orchestration for video games, mostly in the Final Fantasy franchise. His musical style combines impressionism and atonal music. He employs techniques such as polyrhythm, tone clusters, polytonality, brass glissandi and polymodal chromaticism to create unique musical textures.

== Biography ==
Yoshihisa Hirano was born in Wakayama, Japan, in 1971. He started to study composition by himself as an elementary student because of his interest for baroque music. He then discovered jazz in high school, and this enthusiasm has shaped his career in music. He mentioned having listened to Miles Davis, Thelonious Monk, Eric Dolphy and John Coltrane, among others. His admiration of them once gave him dreams of becoming a jazz musician, but he then discovered contemporary music. He gained interest in the works of John Zorn, one of the musicians who had the biggest influence on him in his youth. On the other hand, symphonies by Shostakovich also greatly impressed him, and helped him make up his mind to study composition seriously.

He moved to the United States and studied composition at Juilliard School, in 1992, with Stanley Wolfe. He later entered Eastman School of Music, where he studied with Christopher Rouse and Joseph Schwantner. Some of the awards he has received include first prize in the Axia Tape Competition, in Japan, during his high school years, and New York's New Music for Young Ensembles.

Hirano made his debut as a composer in 2001, in the anime series Beyblade. After that, he made the music for Tokyo DisneySea's 2002 and 2004 countdown celebrations. In 2002, Hirano paired with pianist Masako Hosoda to form the unit Bleu, releasing 3 albums since then. Hirano was also responsible for some of the orchestration and arrangement for a number of Ali Project's albums.

Since then, Hirano has composed for many anime series, as well as music for concert, dance, film and radio, with compositions ranging from classical to pop and contemporary music.

Although Hirano's style can be considered unique and innovative, he cited the composers Isang Yun, Toru Takemitsu, John Zorn, George Crumb, Olivier Messiaen, Tan Dun, György Ligeti and Maurice Ravel as sources of inspiration.

== Works ==
=== Classical music ===
- 2000 – Variations on the Overture from "Die Meistersinger von Nürnberg" for Orchestra
- 2002 – Piano Suite "Le Miracle de la Rose"
- 2005 – Four Variations on Mahler's "Adagietto" for Chamber Orchestra
- 2006 – Conte ~ after Kenji Miyazawa's "Night on the Galactic Railroad" for Piano solo
- 2007 – Variations on a Theme of Paganini for Orchestra
- 2008 – Death Note Concertino for Concert Band
- 2009 – Symphonic Suite "Final Fantasy XIII" for Orchestra
- 2012 – String Quartet "Descending Dragon"
- 2015 – Piano Sonata
- 2015 – "San Narciso Capriccio" for Saxophone Quartet
- 2015 – Exercises Radio Nobles et Sentimentals for Piano Solo
- 2015 – Nocturne of Princess Tankaku for Piano Solo
- 2016 – "LIBERAL DANCES" for Saxophone Quartet
- 2016 – 10 Preludes for Piano Solo
- 2017 – Symphonic Suite "Hunter x Hunter" for Orchestra
- 2018 – Picaresque for Cello Solo
- 2019 – Concerto for Koto and Orchestra "Fukuyama Fantasia"
- 2022 – "Elegy" for Harp and Contrabass
- 2024 – Unnamed Piece for Piano Solo
- 2025 – Rhapsodia Sinfonica HUNTERxHUNTER for Concert Band

=== Anime ===
Yoshihisa Hirano has participated in the making of the soundtracks from the following anime works:

Year	Title	Note(s)	Ref(s)
2001	Beyblade	TV	
2002	Seven of Seven	TV	
2002	Harukanaru Toki no Naka de ~Ajisai Yumegatari~	OVA	
2002	Hanada Shōnen-shi	TV	
2003	Air Master	TV	
2004	Maria-sama ga Miteru	TV; Music arrangement	
2004	Midori Days	TV	
2004	Doki Doki School Hours	TV	
2004	Maria-sama ga Miteru ~Haru~	TV; Opening theme song arrangement	
2004	Harukanaru Toki no Naka de Hachiyō Shō	TV	
2004	Ginyuu Mokushiroku Meine Liebe	TV	
2006	Strawberry Panic	TV	
2006	Ouran High School Host Club	TV	
2006	Harukanaru Toki no Naka de ~Maihitoyo~	Film	
2006	Silk Road Boy Yuto	TV	
2006	Super Robot Wars Original Generation: Divine Wars	TV	
2006	Death Note	TV; Other tracks by Hideki Taniuchi	
2007	Kotetsushin Jeeg	TV	
2008	Top Secret ~The Revelation~	TV	
2008	RD Sennō Chōsashitsu	TV	
2009	Hajime No Ippo: New Challenger	TV	
2009	Tatakau Shisho	TV	
2010	Chu-Bra!!	TV	
2010	Broken Blade	Film series	
2011	Hunter × Hunter (2011)	TV	
2012	Tanken Driland	TV	
2013	Hajime No Ippo: Rising	TV	
2013	Hunter × Hunter: Phantom Rouge	Film	
2013	Hunter × Hunter: The Last Mission	Film	
2014	Broken Blade	TV	
2014	Ai Tenchi Muyo!	TV	
2021	Edens Zero	TV	
2023	Helck	TV	
2026	Red River	TV	

=== Movies ===
Year	Title	Director	Ref(s)
2022	I Am Makimoto	Nobuo Mizuta	
2023	We're Millennials Got a Problem?	Nobuo Mizuta	
2023	Confess to your Crimes	Nobuo Mizuta	

=== Video games ===
Year	Title	Note(s)	Ref(s)
2006	Dirge of Cerberus -Final Fantasy VII-	PS2 game; Orchestration	
2009	Resident Evil: The Darkside Chronicles	Wii game; Orchestration & additional music	
2009	Final Fantasy XIII	PlayStation 3 & Xbox 360 game; Orchestration & additional music	
