= List of Suzuka characters =

Left to right: Yasunobu, Miki, Yamato, Suzuka and Honoka

This is a list of characters of the manga and anime series Suzuka and its sequel Fuuka.

== Akitsuki family ==
=== Suzuka Asahina ===
Suzuka Asahina (朝比奈 涼風, Asahina Suzuka)

- Voiced by: Kanako Mitsuhashi (Japanese); Leah Clark (English)

The titular heroine of the series, she is a talented female high jumper from Yokohama that was scouted by many famous high schools because of her skill. While in Tokyo, she lives in Ayano's dormitory, next door to Yamato. She is a serious athlete that puts a lot of pressure on herself to perform so she does not disappoint others. At first, she has a very cold attitude toward Yamato, but according to her sister, Suzuka only shows her arrogant and somewhat moody attitude to someone she likes, thus showing the characteristics of a tsundere. Because of her past with Kazuki, she was reluctant to express her feelings toward Yamato and ended up trying to push him away for a very long time. Her reaction in the manga and anime was to slap him repeatedly the first time he kissed her. Later in the manga, after they had gone out a short while, he tried to kiss her again and was met with another slap. Then, after a misunderstanding, Suzuka threatened to slap him again, and when he closed his eyes she kissed him, followed up with yet another slap to the face. After a while, she finally admits to herself and to Yamato that she has liked him since the first time they met, and they begin dating.
Their relationship was rocky from the start because of Yamato's carelessness and Suzuka's guarded attitude to her thoughts and feelings. She decides to take the offer to study abroad from Sasoka, claiming the training standards are higher and she will benefit more, but it was really because Yamato complimented her on how cool she looked during her high-jump. After the time-skip, Suzuka moved back into her room next door to Yamato. She, like Yamato, was recommended to Seijo University, which she plans on attending. After Yamato told her he wanted to rekindle their relationship, she was against the idea because she was afraid that if they date again, they will begin to hate each other and drift apart. When Yamato shows his devotion to her, they get back together. Things once again became unsettled after Yamato tries to further their relationship to a physical one. She reacted by slapping him when he groped her. After he apologized, she stated that she was simply nervous of the idea, but that if he wanted to, she would take that step forward. After being caught on their secret trip by her father, she is forced to move back home. Meanwhile she feels ill. After Yamato works out the problems with his father, he convinces her to go get the illness checked out. When she comes out, she reveals that the illness was actually morning sickness, as she is three months pregnant. She initially decides to have an abortion because she doesn't want to disappoint their families and friends. However, after much discussion with Yamato, they both decided to keep the baby and get married, and decided to drop out of the university. Even though Yamato has to get employed to support his new family, Suzuka wants him to get a job in a company which has a track team. Their child was revealed to be a girl named Fūka.
In the manga sequel, Fuuka, Suzuka's full name is now Suzuka Akitsuki after marrying Yamato. While Suzuka is a loving wife and mother, she and Yamato still fight, often over their children. While Yamato tried to get Fuuka to follow in their footsteps as a track and field athlete, Suzuka disagreed and wanted their daughter to be whatever she chose to be. Suzuka and Yamato have a second daughter named Haruka (春花, "spring, flower"; name revealed in Fuuka chapter 74), but their first child, Fuuka, dies in a car accident at age 15.
The given name for Suzuka is derived from the Imperial Japanese Navy destroyer Sukukaze. In Chapter 174 of A Town Where You Live, she is seen with Akari, Kiyomi and Nanami in a bath. She and Fūka make a brief appearance at Fantasy Land in Chapter 126, on board a train in Chapter 257, and in both the OVA's. In Chapter 81 of A Town Where You Live, Suzuka is revealed (indirectly) to be 21 years old.

=== Fuuka Akitsuki ===
Fuuka Akitsuki (秋月 風夏, Akitsuki Fūka)

- Voiced by: Lynn (Japanese); Jill Harris (English)

Fuuka is the heroine of the series, and the daughter of the main characters of Seo's previous manga Suzuka. Yuu initially meets Fuuka after an incident where she accuses him of taking a peek at her panties. Later on, she decides to form a band with Yuu, which is named "The Fallen Moon" after her surname, and becomes the band's vocalist. They successfully perform at their school's school festival. Her fate is different between the manga and the anime adaptation. In the manga, she dies in an accident after she is hit by a truck. In the anime, the truck stops before it could hit her. The anime ends with Fuuka going out with Yuu.
However, in the manga, shortly after starting a music band with various classmates and confessing her love to Yuu, Fuuka is struck and killed by a truck as she was rushing to meet with Yuu and the band for a concert. Her death sends Yuu into a deep depression due to that they had just starting dating and her presence had a profound effect on him. But her death inspires him to continue her goal in becoming a famous band with their friends, and they name band "Fallen Moon", which was her suggestion prior to her death.

=== Yamato Akitsuki ===
Yamato Akitsuki (秋月 大和, Akitsuki Yamato)

- Voiced by: Daisuke Nakamura (Japanese); Todd Haberkorn (English)

The main protagonist of the series. He moved from his home in rural Hiroshima to his aunt's dormitory in Tokyo to change himself. While checking out his new high school, he sees a beautiful high jumper practicing and falls in love at first sight. By chance she happens to be his next door neighbor, Suzuka Asahina. Yamato is clumsy and has a carefree attitude, which often gets him into comprising situations. He has an almost spineless attitude when it comes to defending his position on a subject when confronted and his need to apologize constantly when he thinks he did something wrong makes him a generally weak willed character. When the need arises, he can become focused and determined. He is exceedingly clueless when it comes to girls and their feelings except for the fact the Suzuka is not your typical girl and would be hard for anyone to read. Although not the best in academics, he discovered a natural gift as a sprinter, and joined the track and field team. During his senior year of high school, he became a well-liked and respected track captain. Even though he did not achieve his goal of becoming first nationally during high school in the 100 meters, he was scouted and recommended to attend two universities, either Tohto University or Seijo University.
After being released from his promise with Saki and realizing that he was still in love with Suzuka, he decided to try for acceptance to Seijo University. When he confessed to Suzuka that he wanted to restart their relationship, she stated that she did not because of the fear of getting hurt. Through patience, understanding, and persistence, they made up. During Seijo University's track tryouts, Yamato performed poorly at the start of his race, but showed enough potential at the end for the Selection Committee to unanimously choose him for the scholarship. Pressured by Yasunobu, Yamato decided to take his relationship to the next level. Suzuka initially was against it, but Yamato sets her at ease and they take a step forward in the relationship. Three months later, he learns that Suzuka is pregnant. He is troubled by the decision of her having an abortion and going to the University or keeping the baby and skipping school to work. He admitted to Suzuka that he wants her to keep the baby. After much discussion between the two they both decided to keep the baby and get married, and decided to drop out of the university. It was revealed that they had a daughter named Fūka (風夏, "windy summer" or alternately, "summer wind").
In the manga sequel, Fuuka, it is revealed that Yamato fulfilled his dreams and became a 100 Meter Olympic athlete champion, and won the silver medal in the world championships against Emerson. He and Suzuka had a second daughter named Haruka (春花, "spring, flower"; name revealed in Fuuka chapter 74), who was born on the day he won the silver medal. While he is a loving husband and father, he and Suzuka still fight, often over their children. However, his first daughter, Fuuka, dies in a car accident at age 15.
The character name is derived from the Imperial Japanese Navy destroyer Akizuki and battleship Yamato.

=== Haruka Akitsuki ===
Haruka Akitsuki (秋月 春風, Akitsuki Haruka)

- Voiced by: Hitomi Ōwada (Japanese); Apphia Yu (English)

Fuuka Akitsuki's younger sister, around 8-9 years old. In contrast to Fuuka (who resembles her mother), Haruka resembles her father.

== Suzuka ==
=== Other main characters ===
==== Honoka Sakurai ====
Honoka Sakurai (桜井 萌果, Sakurai Honoka)

- Voiced by: Yumiko Hosono (Japanese); Brina Palencia (English)

She met Yamato from an incident that happened in their childhood at her family's shrine that he often went to when visiting his aunt. Ever since, Honoka has had a crush on him, but was too shy to talk to him. Much to her shock, Yamato entered her high school and was even part of her class. Seeing her opportunity, she begins to talk with him and they become friends. When Yamato joins the track team, she decides to become the manager so they do not grow apart. After a little while, she finally confesses her feelings to Yamato and they begin dating. The relationship lasts less than a month because of Yamato's carelessness and Honoka's own insecurities. After realizing her mistake, she claims that she wants to confess again when she gains more confidence. When she learns that Yamato and Suzuka are dating, she decides to quit being the track manager and take up an offer made by the modeling agency of her best friend, Nana. After a modeling shoot, she happens to run into Yamato again after he has broken up with Suzuka. She clearly still harbors feelings for him but being a popular model, she has become more confident and now can openly talk with him. While at the beach, she asked Yamato if they should be a couple again but in a fit of nervousness played it off as a joke but then asked again. Yamato responded by saying she was important but confused by her earlier nervous play off he asked if it was a joke Because of this incident, she decided to no longer wait for Yamato and began dating a coworker who confessed to her. Honoka met Yamato again and told him they shouldn't meet anymore because she has a boyfriend. Her design was reused for Yuzuki Eba in Kouji Seo's new series A Town Where You Live and she was mentioned briefly on a television show telling about her love situation with Yamato to the audience. She graduated with Yamato and the others. She was also in Suzuka's and Yamato's wedding.

==== Yasunobu Hattori ====
Yasunobu Hattori (服部 安信, Hattori Yasunobu)

- Voiced by: Takanori Ohyama (Japanese); Robert McCollum (English)

Has been friends with Yamato since they were kids. They often met whenever Yamato came to stay with his aunt Ayano; however, Hattori would frequently get Yamato in trouble, since Hattori would take advantage of the fact that Ayano's dormitory also contained a women's bath. He is a ladies' man that, according to Yamato, prefers perverted stuff over eating. He dreams of dating all the girls in the world and the legalization of polygyny in Japan. Yasunobu is often giving relationship advice to Yamato, with rather amusing results, due to the latter's being clueless and tendency to screw up. Even though he sometimes gets Yamato in bad situations, he usually has Yamato's best interests in mind. Much to Yamato and Miki's surprise, Yasunobu has been a straight "A" student during high school. Yasunobu and Miki recently have made cameos in Chapter 67 of A Town Where You Live where they were meeting each other during Haruto's class trip to Tokyo.
The character name is derived from one of Kouji Seo's real-life friends.

==== Miki Hashiba ====
Miki Hashiba (羽柴 美紀, Hashiba Miki)

- Voiced by: Seika Hosokawa (Japanese); Jamie Marchi (English)

Miki is a first year high school student and member of the school field and track team as a sprinter. She is best friends with Suzuka and later Yamato. Before they began attending the same high school, Miki had often encountered Suzuka during track meets and disliked her because Suzuka came off as cold and aloof. However, once she realized that Suzuka's distant nature resulted from her perfectionist tendencies and dedication to her sport, Miki came to respect Suzuka and they became friends. Although initially attracted to Yamato Akitsuki, upon realizing he was infatuated with her best friend Suzuka, she immediately puts a hold on her own feelings. Miki is extremely loyal to her friends and will do anything to help them. She meddles constantly in their affairs and can be quite incessant in forcing them to confront their feelings. When asked what is most important to her in life, her answer was simply, "Friends!"
The surname is derived from one of the old surnames of warlord Toyotomi Hideyoshi.

=== Girls' dormitory ===
==== Ayano Fujikawa ====
Ayano Fujikawa (藤川 綾乃, Fujikawa Ayano)

- Voiced by: Yuki Kaida (Japanese); Gwendolyn Lau (English)

Yamato's aunt, who is the landlady of the women's dormitory and public bathhouse. She lets Yamato stay rent-free and pays him for cleaning. She seems to be close with her tenants and is even proud of their accomplishments. She often cooks meals for her nephew and Suzuka. Yamato's mother revealed that her marriage was an elopement. Even though her husband is deceased, she continues to wear her wedding band.

==== Miho Fujikawa ====
Miho Fujikawa (藤川 美穂, Fujikawa Miho)

- Voiced by: Satomi Akesaka (Japanese); Kate Bristol (English)

Ayano's daughter and Yamato's younger cousin by two years. She is very attached and protective of Yamato to the point of being jealous of Suzuka. Occasionally, she reminds Yamato of his childhood promise to marry her to cheer him up or as a joke. During the time skip, she became a high school student, moved into Suzuka's old room, and became the track manager. When Suzuka moved back to the apartments, she was forced to give up her room and move back in with her mother.

==== Yuka Saotome ====
Yūka Saotome (早乙女 優花, Saotome Yūka)

- Voiced by: Masami Suzuki (Japanese); Colleen Clinkenbeard (English)

A boisterous busybody college student from rural Akita that lives in Ayano's dormitory. She likes to drink and usually ends up in Yamato's room with her best friend Megumi. She has been known to take pictures of Yamato in compromising positions so she can blackmail him later. Even though she considers her relationship with Yamato to be "master and slave", she often tries to help him with his relationship problems and has admitted that she worries about him. He also seems to be one of the few people she can be vulnerable with. In fact, Yamato is the only one that she has told about her one sided love for Sasaoka, who she has liked since high school. She had confessed to him fifteen times, but Sasaoka took it as a joke because she never seriously followed through. These rejections had a profound impact on her life, driving her to change her appearance and her dating behavior. Before Sasaoka left for the United States, Yamato took her to the airport so she could finally convince him of her feelings. Even though she finally got through to him, he revealed he is already engaged to be married next year. She took this rejection well, claiming that she felt refreshed and not as devastated as she originally thought. After thanking Yamato, she proclaimed she will become a better woman and find an even better man. She has since returned her appearance to the way it was when Yamato first met her.
The character name is likely a nod to Japanese voice actress Yuka Saotome.

==== Megumi Matsumoto ====
Megumi Matsumoto (松本 恵美, Matsumoto Megumi)

- Voiced by: Hatsumi Miura (Japanese); Carrie Savage (English)

A soft-spoken, bespectacled college student who also lives in Ayano's dormitory. She is often seen trying to reign in Yuka when she is drunk. Ironically, Megumi gets drunk easily, and in that state is even wilder than Yuka, often berating Yamato on how all men are perverts, accusing Yamato of staring at her chest, flashing him her naked breasts for no reason, and then slapping him for looking. She has expressed the desire to become married.
The character name is likely a nod to Japanese voice actress Megumi Matsumoto.

=== Track Athletes ===
==== Kazuki Tsuda ====
Kazuki Tsuda (津田 和輝, Tsuda Kazuki)

- Voiced by: Mamoru Miyano (Japanese); Orion Pitts (English)

When Suzuka and Sōichi were in middle school, Kazuki was their track captain, and was ranked first in the 100 meter. The similarities between him and Yamato are a striking resemblance in terms of looks, personality, and running talent. During track practices, he and Suzuka would often fight because she wanted practices to be serious and he wanted them to be fun. Before the national tournament, he confessed to her and told her not to answer until he had won. On the day of the tournament, when running home to get his spikes that he forgot, he was hit and killed by a driver who fell asleep at the wheel. His death has since weighed heavily on Suzuka, since she never confessed to him that she reciprocated his feelings for her.
The character surname is likely derived from Japanese baseball player Tsunemi Tsuda of the Hiroshima Toyo Carp.

==== Tetsuhito Kinugasa ====
Tetsuhito Kinugasa (衣笠 鉄人, Kinugasa Tetsuhito)

- Voiced by: Yoshihisa Kawahara (Japanese); Vic Mignogna (English)

The track captain when Yamato first joined the team. He competes in shot put and is often seen putting Yamato in a headlock or making him do extra training. His name (Tetsuhito) literally means "Iron man". He has high expectations for Yamato, so much that during actual tournaments he will not watch Yamato run and often resorts to hiding behind a tree. Even though he has graduated and is now attending Seijō University, he still comes to check on the high school track team. After learning that Yamato and Suzuka got recommendations for Seijō, he offered to show Yamato and Suzuka around the campus. He was personally training Yamato before the start of the academic term, until Yamato decided enter the workforce instead of attending the University. Tetsuhito expressed his disappointment that Yamato did not confide his problems with him. He also made sure that Yamato understood the consequence of his and Suzuka's decision to drop out, since that would mean that Seijō University would probably no longer take members of their high school any more for selections. After seeing Yamato and Suzuka apologizing to the high school track club, he expresses support for their choice.
The character name is derived from Japanese baseball player Sachio Kinugasa of the Hiroshima Toyo Carp, whose nickname was Tetsujin (鉄人, lit. Man of Steel) itself derived from Tetsujin 28-go.

==== Soichi Miyamoto ====
Sōichi Miyamoto (宮本 総一, Miyamoto Sōichi)

- Voiced by: Takeshi Maeda (Japanese); Kevin M. Connolly (English)

One of the members of the track team and captain after Kinugasa graduates. A classmate of Suzuka's from junior high school. After hearing about Yamato's performance in physical tests, he actively persuades Yamato to join the track team. When Yamato came to him to help with making better times, he analyzed that data, found that Yamato was reaching his top speed too early, and made a training regimen for him. He believes Yamato has the potential to surpass Kazuki's skill. Before graduating, he chose Yamato to become the next track captain. He is currently part of Tōto University's track team and was influential in Yamato getting his recommendation. Even though Yamato eventually chose to attend Seijō, he still wanted him to perform his best.
The character name is derived from legendary Japanese swordsman Miyamoto Musashi.

==== Arima Emerson ====
Arima Emerson (エメルソン·有馬, Emeruson Arima)

- Voiced by: Takahiro Hirano (Japanese); Greg Ayres (English)

He is Yamato's main track rival, who is ranked first nationally in the 100 meter sprint. He initially went to Tōto University High School. During junior high school, he was always beaten by Kazuki, which is still a touchy subject for him. Like Suzuka, he took up the offer to study abroad in United States, during which he stayed informed about Yamato's running times back in Japan. Afterward, he decided to go Tōto University and run for their track team. He indirectly helped Yamato realize that Suzuka and their unborn child was more important to him than track which led to Yamato's decision to not attend university and become employed to support his family. Near the end of the series, he still expresses hopes that he will have a chance to compete with Yamato in the Olympics. He went on to represent Japan in the 100m sprint.
The character name is derived from Brazilian striker Emerson who played for the Urawa Red Diamonds and the Arima clan of Feudal Japan.

==== Kenji Kobayakawa ====
Kenji Kobayakawa (小早川 健二, Kobayakawa Kenji)

- Voiced by: Ryou Naito (Japanese); David Trosko (English)

A hard working sprinter of the track team who was on an athletic scholarship. Even though he is a talented sprinter, he is not as fast as Yamato in the 100 meters. He dislikes Yamato because he outperforms him in track and Honoka, the girl he liked, had only had eyes for Yamato. Like Yamato, he was scouted by the universities in his senior year at high school. When Yamato and Suzuka told the high school track club that they dropped out of Seijō University, he was the only member that was upset about their decision. A running joke through the series is that he is often forgotten about by the other characters. He went on to represent Japan in the 200m race.
The character name is derived from Japanese baseball player Takehiko Kobayakawa of the Hiroshima Toyo Carp.

==== Tsuyoshi Kusakabe ====
Tsuyoshi Kusakabe (日下部 刚, Kusakabe Tsuyoshi)
He is one of classmates of Miho's. He has liked Miho for a long time, but has had little success with winning her affections. During his first year in high school, he joined the track team and it's implied that he hung around Miho, who's usually with Yamato, as much as possible. On the track team, he became arrogant when he was not under Yamato's supervision. This caused Yamato to treat Tsuyoshi in a similar fashion as Kinugasa treated Yamato. With support from Miho and Suzuka and with Yamato's guidance, he was able to take first place at the rookie track meet.
The character surname is likely derived from the Kusakabe clan of Feudal Japan.

=== Other characters ===
==== Nana Shirakawa ====
Nana Shirakawa (白川 奈々, Shirakawa Nana)

- Voiced by: Michie Kitaura (Japanese); Kristine Sa (English)

A popular singing idol who has been Honoka's mentor. Most are surprised to discover this because it is unexpected that someone as timid as Honoka would have such glamorous acquaintances. Even though Nana's famous, she considers Honoka to be her only friend because she treats her normally. Because of this she is very protective of her.
The character surname is likely derived from Japanese idol Yukina Shirakawa.

==== Suzune Asahina ====
Suzune Asahina (朝比奈 涼音, Asahina Suzune)

- Voiced by" Mina Tominaga (Japanese), Laura Bailey (English)

Suzuka's older sister by one year. According to her younger sister, Suzune is slightly dim-witted. Early in the series, every time she meets Yamato, she has the family dog "Muku" attack him. She is the only character that has an easy time reading Suzuka's thoughts. She shows up later on when Yamato walks home Suzuka from a date. She was apparently very amused when Yamato first met her parents and reveals later that unlike Yamato, her own boyfriend was not allowed into their house by her stern father because he failed to greet Mr. Asahina properly.

==== Yui Amami ====
Yui Amami (天見 結衣, Amami Yui)
One of the girls in the group date that Yasunobu tricked Yamato into going on. She took a liking to him and her feelings only grew when Yamato began working at her family's cafe, which was the only place of employment that Yamato could find that allowed him to work one day a week. After Yamato and Suzuka broke up, she visited Yamato to try and cheer him up. Seeing the state he was in, she tried to comfort him both physically and emotionally, but found that he did not reciprocate her feelings. She was later on invited by Yasunobu to celebrate Yamato and Suzuka's marriage held by their friends, which made Yamato nervous until Yasunobu reassured him that she was not the type to hang on forever. Later on she was in attendance at their wedding ceremony. Yui and her father made cameos in chapter 90 and 225 of A Town Where You Live.
The character name is likely derived from Japanese actress Yūki Amami.

==== Hiroshi Sasaoka ====
Hiroshi Sasaoka (佐々岡 浩志, Sasaoka Hiroshi)
A salesman for the sports equipment company "Adriex". One of his jobs is to recruit Japan's top student athletes to study abroad and train in the United States, for which all expenses are paid by his company. He was also Yuka's crush from high school, but, much to her displeasure, he still treated her like a younger sister. Before transferring him back to the United States for the next 5 to 6 years, Yuka finally convinces him of her feelings for him. He told her that a relationship was not possible because he was already engaged to be married next year. Later on, he comes back to Japan to make wedding preparations, during which he was contacted by Suzuka about any employment opportunities for Yamato. He said there was an opening in an affiliate company and he would be willing to give Yamato a recommendation, which led to Yamato getting employed by a company that has a track team.
The character surname is derived from Japanese baseball player Shinji Sasaoka of the Hiroshima Toyo Carp.

==== Saki Asai ====
Saki Asai (浅井 咲希, Asai Saki)
Yamato's childhood friend from Hiroshima, who is also the same girl from his original firefly confession. She stayed at Ayano's dormitory for about a week while she toured Touto University, where she wanted to study fashion. She learned that Yamato was recommended to Touto, which she had made him pinky swear they would attend together. During her stay, she showed interest in her childhood friend, but her advances were mistaken by Yamato for her playful nature. After she realized that Yamato was still in love with then ex-girlfriend Suzuka, she released him from the promise before she returned home. Later on she is seen attending Yamato and Suzuka's wedding ceremony.
The character surname is derived from Japanese baseball player Itsuki Asai of the Hiroshima Toyo Carp.

==== Fūka Akitsuki ====
Fūka Akitsuki (秋月 風夏, Akitsuki Fūka)
Yamato and Suzuka's daughter. She stars as a protagonist in Kōji Seo's new manga series Fuuka. She closely resembles her mother but has a combination of both of her parents' personalities. She is short-tempered like her mother but is more carefree like her father, and is able to make friends with everyone around her. While she is skilled in track and field, she doesn't share her parents' love for sports and is more interested in music. When she enters in high school, she meets the male protagonist, Yuu, whom she initially thinks is perverted due to an embarrassing encounter from their first meeting. However, she later befriends him and falls in love with him.

== Fuuka ==
=== Main characters ===
Yuu Haruna (榛名 優, Haruna Yū)

- Voiced by: Yūsuke Kobayashi (Japanese); Aaron Dismuke (English)

Yuu is bassist of the band The Fallen Moon (later renamed Blue Wells). After transferring to a school in Tokyo, he meets Fuuka Akitsuki, a mysterious woman who does not have a cellphone. At her request, they form a band, which later performs at their school's school festival.
Fuuka Aoi (碧井 風夏, Aoi Fūka)
Generally referred to as Aoi to distinguish her from Fuuka Akitsuki, she is a budding musician who originally came from Izu, Shizuoka. After performing at a battle-of-the-bands competition, she later performs together with The Fallen Moon at a music festival organized by the band Hedgehogs. Following this, Aoi requests that she join The Fallen Moon. It is later revealed that her father was the driver of the truck which killed Akitsuki. She falls for him later on in the series and begins to date him in chapter 146 after playing the song he wrote for her expressing his feelings.
Koyuki Hinashi (氷無 小雪, Hinashi Koyuki)

- Voiced by: Saori Hayami (Japanese); Jeannie Tirado (English)

Koyuki is Yuu's childhood friend and a popular singer. Following an incident where she and Yuu are seen in public together, she confesses her love for him on national television. After retiring as a solo musician, she secretly forms the band Rabbitz, whose members wear rabbit heads during performances. By the end of the manga, she disbands Rabbitz and becomes the new lead vocalist of the Hedgehogs.

=== The Fallen Moon ===
Makoto Mikasa (三笠 真琴, Mikasa Makoto)

- Voiced by: Soma Saito (Japanese); Ricco Fajardo (English)

Makoto is the keyboardist of the Blue Wells music band. He is well-liked by his fellow female schoolmates and girls in general. He has won piano competitions in the past. He initially thinks of himself as gay, but realizes he is bisexual after falling in love with his teacher Tomomi.
Kazuya Nachi (那智 一矢, Nachi Kazuya)

- Voiced by: Kazuyuki Okitsu (Japanese); Shawn Gann (English)

Kazuya is the drummer of the band. At first relentless at trying to recruit Fuuka to their school's track and field team, he later becomes the "leader" of the music band. He later develops feelings for Sara.
Sara Iwami (石見 沙羅, Iwami Sara)

- Voiced by: Mikako Komatsu (Japanese); Elizabeth Maxwell (English)

Sara is a student at Yuu and Fuuka's school, and the younger sister of Hisashi, Hedgehogs' guitarist. Like Hisa, Sara plays the guitar. She is actually Yuu's online friend, one of the very few people he was comfortable talking to before he met Fuuka. Upon realizing this, she develops a crush on him.

=== Haruna family ===
Maya Haruna (榛名 麻耶, Haruna Maya)

- Voiced by: Mikako Takahashi (Japanese); Felecia Angelle (English)

Yuu's eldest sister who works at an advertising agency.
Hibiki Haruna (榛名 響, Haruna Hibiki)

- Voiced by: Saori Ōnishi (Japanese); Alex Moore (English)

Yuu's other older sister who attends college.
Chitose Haruna (榛名 知歳, Haruna Chitose)

- Voiced by: Kaede Hondo (Japanese); Kristen McGuire (English)

Yuu's younger sister who is attending middle school.

=== Hedgehogs ===
Ms Tomomi (友美 先生)

- Voiced by: Yōko Hikasa (Japanese); Tia Ballard (English)

Tomomi Yoshino (吉野 友美, Yoshino Tomomi) is Yuu and Fuuka's homeroom teacher. It is later revealed that she is the former keyboardist of the band Hedgehogs, Yuu and Fuuka's favorite band. She later becomes Makoto's girlfriend.
Hisashi Iwami (石見 寿, Iwami Hisashi)

- Voiced by: Daisuke Hirakawa (Japanese); Seth Magill (English)

He is the former guitarist of the Hedgehogs. He runs a music studio and is Sara's older brother.
Nobuaki Yahagi (矢矧 伸明, Yahagi Nobuaki)

- Voiced by: Daisuke Ono (Japanese); Ian Sinclair (English)

He is the former drummer for the Hedgehogs, who now runs the "South Wind" Beach House.
Tama (たま)

- Voiced by: Manami Numakura (Japanese); Caitlin Glass (English)

Reika Tama (多摩 レイカ, Tama Reika)^{Ch. 153} is the former vocalist for the Hedgehogs. At the end of the series, she and Nico marry.
Nico (ニコ, Niko)

- Voiced by: Yuichi Nakamura (Japanese); Jason Liebrecht (English)

Musashi Nicholson Oda (小田 ニコルソン 武蔵, Oda Nikoruson Musashi)^{Ch. 153} is the former bass player for the Hedgehogs.

=== Others ===
Manager Yamada (山田マネージャー, Yamada Manējā)

- Voiced by: Mai Nakahara (Japanese); Monica Rial (English)

Koyuki's manager.
Akira Mogami (最上 彰, Mogami Akira)

- Voiced by: Yasuaki Takumi (Japanese); Aaron Roberts (English)

Mogami is a music producer for young artists.
Sakura Katsuragi (葛城 桜, Katsuragi Sakura)
A character who Yuu meets in the manga. She bears a striking resemblance to Fuuka. It is later revealed that she was a classmate of Yuu and Fuuka who had moved to Fukuoka and changed her appearance to resemble Fuuka, who she greatly admired.
