= Hunter × Hunter: The Last Mission =

2013 film by Keiichiro Kawaguchi

- Theatrical release poster
- Directed by: Keiichiro Kawaguchi
- Written by: Nobuaki Kishima
- Based on: Hunter × Hunter by Yoshihiro Togashi
- Starring: Ichirō Nagai; Megumi Han; Mariya Ise; Shidou Nakamura
- Music by: Yoshihisa Hirano
- Production company: Madhouse
- Distributed by: Toho
- Release date: December 27, 2013 (Japan)
- Running time: 98 minutes
- Country: Japan
- Language: Japanese
- Box office: ¥850 million ($8.71 million)

Hunter × Hunter: The Last Mission (Japanese: 劇場版 Hunter×Hunter - The Last Mission-, Hepburn: Gekijō-ban Hantā Hantā: Za Rasuto Misshon) is a 2013 Japanese animated feature film directed by Keiichiro Kawaguchi. Released on December 27, 2013, it is the second film based on the Hunter × Hunter manga series by Yoshihiro Togashi. Viz Media released the film on home video in North America on March 12, 2019.

== Plot ==
The film begins before the plot of Hunter x Hunter, some decades ago, when the chairman of the Hunters Association, Isaac Netero, defeats a powerful enemy known as Jed. Back to the present, a group of cloaked men storm into a prison and free the captives there, recruiting them for their plan. Some time later, Gon and Killua take a break from their expeditions with Kite to pay another visit at Heaven's Arena and cheer for their friend Zushi in the Battle Olympia Tournament with Wing and Biscuit. Meanwhile, Leorio, who is also bound to meet them, is attacked and knocked out by the cloaked men. Before the tournament begins, Gon and Killua pay a visit to Netero, who is also at the building, but the Arena is taken over by the mysterious men, with one of them, Gaki, replacing Zushi's first opponent and defeating him, another one, Shura, taking over the security system and a third one, Rengoku, stabbing herself and putting a curse on Netero to seal his Nen and immobilizing him. The ringleader then appears and knocks Gon and Killua down from the tower, but the duo manage to avoid the fall and return to the building, several floors below.

Netero recognizes the ringleader as Jed, and it is revealed that Jed was once Netero's friend and leader of "Shadow", the Hunter Association's black ops squad, that was destroyed by the chairman after they began to make use of "On", a cursed power that is opposite to Nen and is fueled by the user's pure hatred. Jed and his companions' objective is to force the Hunter Association to disclose the "Black Report", a record of the crimes against the descendants of "Shadow" to the public, that had peacefully settled after the organization was destroyed, but some time later were wrongly pursued and hunted down by the government, with three survivors, Gaki, Shura and Rengoku, to use their hatred to revive Jed, who taught them to use On. Meanwhile, Gon and Killua fight their way up the tower until Gaki appears to fight them, and Kurapika, who was present at the tournament to escort his employer, Neon, confronts Shura. Amidst the chaos, Leorio rises from the sewers inside the building and is helped by Hisoka, who also was inside the building to reunite with Kurapika. Once Gon and Killua defeat Geki, he self-destructs as his covenant states that losing to a Hunter will cost his life. Kurapika also defeats Shura with Leorio's help, but before dying, Shura infects Kurapika with Jed's blood, sealing his Nen and claiming that he will die unless he embraces On instead.

Once reunited with the others, Gon and Killua decide to confront Jed at the roof while Leorio stays behind to take care of Kurapika. In the occasion, Gon is also infected by his blood and decides to embrace On to keep fighting him, while Killua convinces Rengoku to give up on her hatred and she dies, freeing Netero from her curse. Netero confronts Jed, but instead of attacking him, he decides to defend all his attacks until the hatred on him subsides. Jed is ultimately defeated when Gon purifies the On in his body with his own Nen and does the same to him, allowing him to finally die in peace. After the remaining members of Shadow are defeated, Heaven's Arena returns to normal and the Battle Olympia Tournament is finally allowed to begin.

== Cast ==
Character	Japanese voice actor	English voice actor
Isaac Netero	Ichirō Nagai	John Snyder
Gon Freecss	Megumi Han	Erica Mendez
Killua Zoldyck	Mariya Ise	Cristina Vee
Jed	Shidou Nakamura	Billy Kametz
Rengoku	Mizuki Yamamoto	Kimberley Anne Campbell
Shura	Hiroyuki Amano	Xander Mobus
Kurapika	Miyuki Sawashiro	Erika Harlacher
Leorio Paradinight	Keiji Fujiwara	Matthew Mercer
Zushi	Yuka Terasaki	Kira Buckland
Wing	Toshihiko Seki	Ezra Weisz
Neon	Kana Ueda	Faye Mata
Hisoka Morow	Daisuke Namikawa	Keith Silverstein
Biscuit Krueger	Chisa Yokoyama	Tara Sands
Beans	Ichitarō Ai	Tony Oliver
Melody	Miina Tominaga	Dorothy Fahn
Cocco	Kotono Mitsuishi	Rachael Lillis

== Development ==
Hunter × Hunter: The Last Mission was announced on January 12, 2013, as a teaser trailer at the end of the first film, Hunter × Hunter: Phantom Rouge. In August, the release date and basic plot outline were given in the year's 37 issue of Weekly Shōnen Jump. The first trailer for the film was released over a week later. Like the previous film, music duo Yuzu provides the theme song, "Hyōri Ittai" (表裏一体; "Two Sides of the Same Coin"). A second full trailer was released in November. A novel adaptation of the film, written by Hajime Tanaka, was released on December 27, 2013.

== Release ==
In the first ten days, the film earned ¥571 million ($5.47 million) at the Japanese box office. By its third week, the film earned ¥689,924,282 ($6,614,304). By the end of its run, the film grossed ¥850 million ($8.71 million) at the Japanese box office.

The home video DVD of the film was released on July 23, 2014, selling 3,367 copies its first week for seventh place on Oricon's Japan Animation DVD chart. It sold 5,196 copies in four weeks before falling off the chart.

Like the first film, Hunter × Hunter: The Last Mission received its United States premiere at the Japan Film Festival of San Francisco on July 26, 2014.

At Anime NYC in November 2018, Viz Media announced that an English dub would screen in select United States theaters on January 30, 2019. They released the film on home video in North America on March 12, 2019.
