= Erica Mendez =

American voice actress

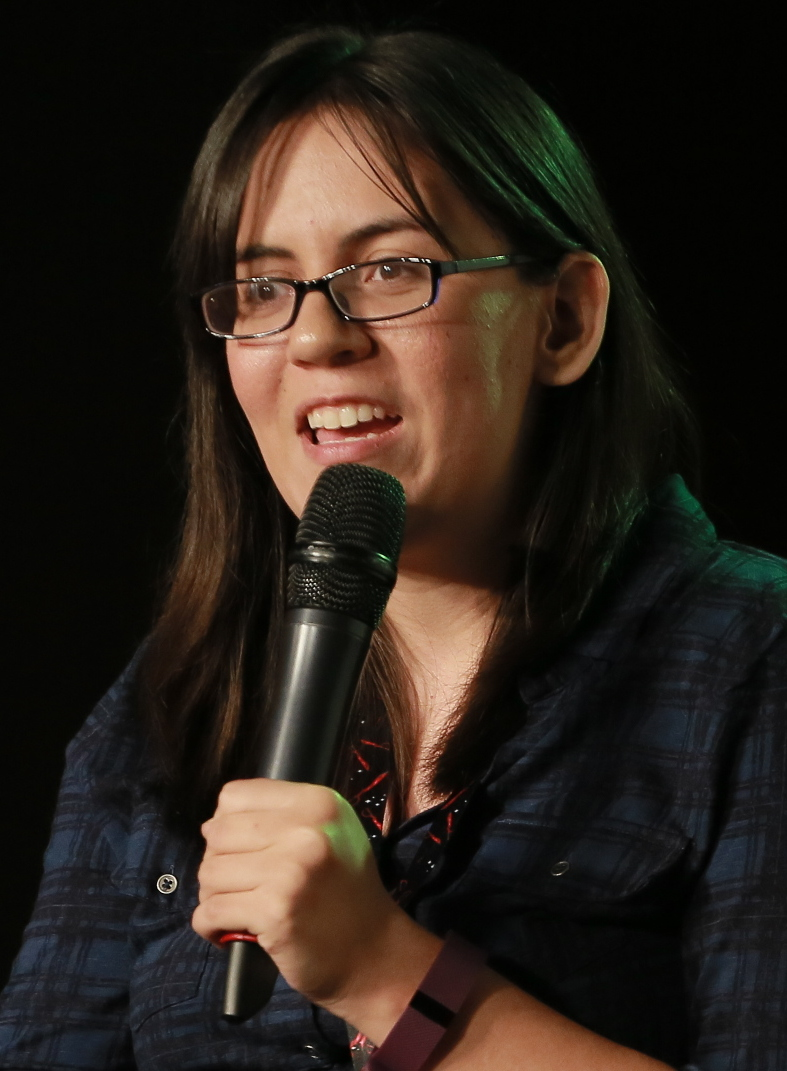
- Mendez in 2015
- Born: Chicago, Illinois, U.S.
- Occupation: Voice actress
- Years active: 2010–present
- Website: ericamendezvoice.com

Erica Mendez is an American voice actress known primarily for her roles in English dubs of Japanese anime. She studied graphic design in college for three years prior to becoming a voice actress.

== Career ==
Mendez's first major voice role was the titular character Pac-Man in the Pac-Man and the Ghostly Adventures video game, which was released in 2013. In 2014, Mendez starred as Aladdin in the Magi: The Labyrinth of Magic series and Ryuko Matoi in the English dub of Kill la Kill, the latter of which was broadcast on the Toonami block on Adult Swim. Some of Mendez's other major roles include Haruka Tenoh/Sailor Uranus in the Viz Media English dub of Sailor Moon, Maki Harukawa in Danganronpa V3: Killing Harmony, Nagisa Shingetsu in Danganronpa Another Episode: Ultra Despair Girls, Gon Freecss in the English dub of the 2011 anime adaptation of Hunter × Hunter and Retsuko in the English dub of Netflix anime series Aggretsuko, Annie in the fighting game Skullgirls, Kamisato Ayaka in Genshin Impact, Rixia Mao and Elie MacDowell in The Legend of Heroes: Trails of Cold Steel series, Wang Ai Ling in the English-language Chinese animated series Stitch & Ai, Diane in The Seven Deadly Sins, Arle Nadja in the Puyo Puyo series, Emma in The Promised Neverland, Itsuki Sumeragi in the English dub of the Netflix anime Kakegurui and White Lily Cookie and Black Pearl Cookie in Cookie Run: Kingdom.

== Personal life ==
Mendez is asexual, and her parents are Mexican immigrants.

== Filmography ==
=== Anime ===
List of dubbing performances in anime
Year	Title	Role	Notes	Source
2013	Treasure Island	Jim Hawkins	Bang Zoom dub	Resume
2013	Tamagotchi Friends	Mametchi		Resume
2014–2015	Magi: The Labyrinth of Magic	Aladdin	Also Magi: The Kingdom of Magic	
2014–2015	Kill la Kill	Ryuko Matoi	Also OVA	
2014	Blood Lad	Jasmine, Young Staz, Angry, others		Press
2014–2018	Yo-kai Watch	Shelly	(Season 1–2)	
2014–2019	Sailor Moon	Haruka Tenoh/Sailor Uranus, Reika Nishimura	Viz dub, ADR Script for SuperS	
2015	Yuki Yuna is a Hero	Fu Inubozaki		
2015	A Lull in the Sea	Akari Sakishima		
2015–2016	Aldnoah.Zero	Inko Amifumi		
2015	Sword Art Online	Yuuki Konno		
2015–2021	The Seven Deadly Sins	Diane		Tweet
2015	Sailor Moon Crystal	Haruka Tenoh/Sailor Uranus, Reika Nishimura		Resume
2015–2017	Little Witch Academia	Atsuko "Akko" Kagari		
2016	Love Live!	Nico Yazawa		
2016	Your Lie in April	Tsubaki Sawabe		
2016–2019	Hunter × Hunter	Gon Freecss	2011 series	
2016–2018	Mobile Suit Gundam: Iron-Blooded Orphans	Cracker Griffon, Elgar		Tweet
2016	Charlotte	Nomura, others		Tweet
2016–2017	Erased	Kenya Kobayashi		
2016	Mob Psycho 100	Chihiro, others		Tweet
2017	Little Witch Academia	Atsuko "Akko" Kagari		
2017	Cyborg 009: Call of Justice	Cyborg 001/Ivan Whisky		
2017	Gosick	Avril Bradley		
2017	Berserk	Rickert	2016 series	
2017	Glitter Force Doki Doki	Davi		
2017	Fate/Grand Order	Mash Kyrielight	Anime Special	
2017	Anohana: The Flower We Saw That Day	Chiriko "Tsuruko" Tsurumi		
2017	Mobile Suit Gundam SEED	Flay Allster	NYAV Post dub	
2017	Fate/Apocrypha	Assassin of Black, Roche Frain Yggdmillenia	ADR script writer	
2018	B: the Beginning	Young Koku		
2018	Gundam Build Divers	Yukio Hidaka / Yukki		
2018	JoJo's Bizarre Adventure: Stardust Crusaders	Young Polnareff		Tweet
2018–2023	Aggretsuko	Retsuko		
2018–present	Re:Zero − Starting Life in Another World	Puck, Petra Leyte		
2018–2024	Boruto: Naruto Next Generations	Denki Kaminarimon		Tweet
2018, 2024–2025	My Hero Academia	Melissa Shield, Hercules		
2018	Beyblade Burst Turbo	Gumita, Hayao Ashida		
2019–present	The Rising of the Shield Hero	Raphtalia		
2019–2020	KonoSuba	Megumin		
2019–2021	The Promised Neverland	Emma		
2019	Ingress: The Animation	Makoto (Child)		
2019	Cells at Work!	Regulatory T Cell		
2019	High School Prodigies Have It Easy Even In Another World	Prince Akatsuki		
2020	Magia Record	Rena Minami		Tweet
2020	The 8th Son? Are You Kidding Me?	Iina, Wendelin (Child)		
2020–2023	Pokémon: The Series	Parker, Devi's Minun		
2020–2021	Fruits Basket	Satsuki Soma		Tweet
2020	Dragon's Dogma	Hannah	Netflix ONA	
2020–2022	Yashahime: Princess Half-Demon	Towa Higurashi		
2020	The Irregular at Magic High School	Erika Chiba		
2021	86	Kurena Kukumila		
2021	I've Been Killing Slimes for 300 Years and Maxed Out My Level	Beelzebub		Tweet
2021	Shaman King	Hao Asakura	2021 series	
2021	Scarlet Nexus	Kasane Randall		
2021–present	To Your Eternity	Gugu (young), Princess Alme		Tweet
2021	Magatsu Wahrheit Zuerst	Elfried (Monster)		
2021	The Faraway Paladin	Will		
2022	Bidoof's Big Stand	Additional Bidoof		
2022	Demon Slayer: Kimetsu no Yaiba	Makio		Tweet
2022	Blue Reflection Ray	Momo		
2023	Nier: Automata Ver1.1a	Lily		
2023	KonoSuba: An Explosion on This Wonderful World!	Megumin		
2023	A Place Further than the Universe	Shirase Kobuchizawa		
2023–present	Rurouni Kenshin	Myōjin Yahiko		
2023–present	Jujutsu Kaisen	Uraume		
2023–present	Pokémon Horizons: The Series	Mollie		
2024	Delicious in Dungeon	Child Laios, Leed, Female Student 2		
2024	Kimi ni Todoke	Ayane Yano		
2024	T・P Bon	Neesh, Thomas, Boy, Queen, Rohilla		
2024–2025	Rascal Does Not Dream of Bunny Girl Senpai	Mai Sakurajima		
2024	Sound! Euphonium	Kumiko Oumae		
2025	Witch Watch	Kara Minami		
2025	Tougen Anki	Homare Byobugaura		
2025	Yaiba: Samurai Legend	Yaiba		
2025	Ranma ½	Koguruma, Ukyo Kuonji	2024 series	
2026	Needy Girl Overdose	Kache	ADR script writer	
2026	JoJo's Bizarre Adventure: Steel Ball Run	Diego Brando (child)	Episode 10	

=== Western animation ===
List of voice performances in Western animation
Year	Title	Role	Notes	Source
2014	Lalaloopsy: Welcome to L.A.L.A. Prep School	Cloud E. Sky		Resume
2014–present	Lego Friends	Andrea	Ep. 16 onwards	Resume
2017	Stitch & Ai	Wang Ai Ling	All episodes; English-language-produced Chinese animated series; English version debuted in 2018	
2017	OK K.O.! Let's Be Heroes	Black Strategy	Ep. "Back in Red Action"	
2019	YooHoo to the Rescue	Lora		

=== Films ===
List of voice performances in films
Year	Title	Role	Notes	Source
2016	Love Live! The School Idol Movie	Nico Yazawa		
2017	Fairy Tail: Dragon Cry	Sonya	Funimation limited theatrical release	
2018	Hunter × Hunter: Phantom Rouge	Gon Freecss		
2018	Sailor Moon S: The Movie	Haruka Tenoh/Sailor Uranus	Limited theatrical release, Viz dub	
2018	Sailor Moon SuperS: The Movie	Bonbon Babies, Haruka Tenoh/Sailor Uranus	Limited theatrical release, Viz dub	
2018	My Hero Academia: Two Heroes	Melissa Shield	Funimation limited theatrical release	Tweet
2018	The Seven Deadly Sins the Movie: Prisoners of the Sky	Diane	Netflix	
2019	I Want to Eat Your Pancreas		ADR Director, limited theatrical release	
2019	Hunter × Hunter: The Last Mission	Gon Freecss		
2019	Sound! Euphonium: The Movie – Our Promise: A Brand New Day	Kumiko Oumae	Limited theatrical release	
2020	Ni no Kuni	Tatsunori	Netflix	
2021	Case Closed: The Fist of Blue Sapphire	Ai Haibara		
2021	Sailor Moon Eternal	Haruka Tenoh/Super Sailor Uranus	Netflix	
2021	The Seven Deadly Sins: Cursed by Light	Diane	Netflix	
2024	Rascal Does Not Dream of a Knapsack Kid	Mai Sakurajima		
2025	Virgin Punk: Clockwork Girl	Noa Andriette		

=== Video games ===
List of voice performances in video games
Year	Title	Role	Notes	Source
2010	Heroes of Newerth	Pearl, Ruby, Good Witch Pearl		Resume
2011	God Eater: Resurrection	Female Custom Voice 2		Resume
2012	Dust: An Elysian Tail	Corbin		
2013	Yousei	Jupiter Celedon		Resume
2013	Pac-Man and the Ghostly Adventures	Pac		Resume
2014	Atelier Escha & Logy: Alchemists of the Dusk Sky	Micie Sun Mussemburg		Resume
2014	Smite	Primal Huntress Artemis		Resume
2014	The Witch and the Hundred Knight	Lucchini		Resume
2014	Demon Gaze	Fran Pendoll		Resume
2014	Fairy Fencer F	Eryn	Also Advent Dark Force	Resume, Tweet
2014	Ar Nosurge	Tatoria, Tsunderain	Also Plus	Resume
2014	Pac-Man and the Ghostly Adventures 2	Pac		Resume
2015	Dead or Alive 5: Last Round	Naotora Ii	Post-Release DLC	Tweet
2015	Hyperdevotion Noire: Goddess Black Heart	Moru, Blossom		Resume
2015	Omega Quintet	Kanadeko		Resume
2015	Operation Abyss: New Tokyo Legacy	Mula, Miharu, Tae-Hyun, Mao		Resume
2015	Skullgirls: 2nd Encore	Annie: Girl of the Stars		
2015	Danganronpa Another Episode: Ultra Despair Girls	Nagisa Shingetsu		Tweet
2015	Disgaea 5: Alliance of Vengeance	Maid		Resume
2015	Backstage Pass	Allison		
2015	Cryamore	Esmyrelda Maximus		
2015	Xenoblade Chronicles X	Additional voices		
2016	Street Fighter V	Satsuki		
2016	Atelier Sophie: The Alchemist of the Mysterious Book	Leon		
2016	Trails of Cold Steel II	Rixia Mao		
2017	Paladins	Talus		Resume
2017	Akiba's Beat	Saki Hoshino		
2017	Tales of Berseria	Eleanor Hume		Tweet
2017	Puyo Puyo Tetris	Arle Nadja		Tweet
2017	Dark Rose Valkyrie	Yue Hiiragi		Resume
2017	Danganronpa V3: Killing Harmony	Maki Harukawa		Tweet
2017	Cyberdimension Neptunia: 4 Goddesses Online	Noire / Black Heart	Replaced Erin Fitzgerald due to SAG contract complications	
2017	Fire Emblem Heroes	Deirdre, Bernadetta		
2017	Fire Emblem Warriors	Lianna		
2017	Battle Chef Brigade	Mina		Tweet
2018	Radiant Historia	Eruca	3DS remake	Tweet
2018	Detective Pikachu	Amanda Blackstone		
2018	BlazBlue: Cross Tag Battle	Orie Ballardiae		Tweet
2018	Valkyria Chronicles 4	Leena "Kai" Schulen		
2018	Octopath Traveler	Additional voices		
2018	Soulcalibur VI	Seong Mi-na		Tweet
2019	Death end re;Quest	Al Astra		Tweet
2019	Ace Combat 7: Skies Unknown	Brownie / Golem 2		Tweet
2019	Zanki Zero: Last Beginning	Minamo Setouchi		In-game credits
2019	Fire Emblem: Three Houses	Bernadetta		Tweet
2019	Pokémon Masters	Gardenia, Hilda		Tweet
2019	Code Vein	Mia Karnstein		Resume
2019	Digimon ReArise	Michi Shinjo		Tweet
2020	The Legend of Heroes: Trails of Cold Steel IV	Elie MacDowell		
2020	13 Sentinels: Aegis Rim	Natsuno Minami		Tweet
2020	Hyrule Warriors: Age of Calamity	Great Fairy Tera		
2020	Genshin Impact	Kamisato Ayaka, Katheryne		
2021	Re:Zero − Starting Life in Another World: The Prophecy of the Throne	Puck/Apocalypse Beast, Mimi Pearlbaton, Petra Leyte		
2021	Ys IX: Monstrum Nox	Doll		
2021	Story of Seasons: Pioneers of Olive Town	"Cute" Protagonist		Tweet
2021	New Pokémon Snap	Phil		
2021	Cookie Run: Kingdom	White Lily Cookie, Black Pearl Cookie		
2021	Scarlet Nexus	Kasane Randall		
2022	Chocobo GP	Shirma Magnolie		
2022	Phantom Breaker: Omnia	Mikoto Nishina		
2022	Rune Factory 5	Scarlett, Child		
2022	Relayer	Additional voices		
2022	Fire Emblem Warriors: Three Hopes	Bernadetta		In-game credits
2022	Soul Hackers 2	Figue		
2022	Legends of Runeterra	Solitude, The Prefect		Tweet
2022	Star Ocean: The Divine Force	Marielle L. Kenny		
2023	Octopath Traveler II	Throné Anguis		
2023	Omega Strikers	Juliette		
2023	Trinity Trigger	Rai, Elech		
2023	Master Detective Archives: Rain Code	Additional voices		
2023	The Legend of Heroes: Trails into Reverie	Elie MacDowell, Lenalee		
2023	Anonymous;Code	Asuma Soga		
2024	Unicorn Overlord	Leah		
2024	Puyo Puyo Puzzle Pop	Arle Nadja		
2024	Sand Land	Additional voices		
2024	The Legend of Heroes: Trails Through Daybreak	Halle Coleman, Naje Berka, citizens		
2024	Romancing SaGa 2: Revenge of the Seven	Sophia/Crusader (F)		
2025	The Legend of Heroes: Trails Through Daybreak II	Halle Coleman, Naje Berka, citizens		
2025	Lunar Remastered Collection	Nall, Phacia, Fresca, Mauri		In-game credits
2025	Rune Factory: Guardians of Azuma	Kotaro, Sayo		
2025	Date Everything!	Arma		
2025	Zenless Zone Zero	Trigger		
2025	Digimon Story: Time Stranger	Kyoko Kuremi, Alphamon		
2025	Octopath Traveler 0	Carinda, Isla		
2026	The Legend of Zelda: Ocarina of Time	Princess Zelda / Sheik		

=== Web original ===
Year	Title	Role	Notes	Source
2011	Death Battle	Rainbow Dash	Episode 17: "Starscream VS Rainbow Dash"	

Preceded by Sarah Lafleur	Voice of Sailor Uranus; 2014-present	Succeeded by Current
