= Killua Zoldyck =

Fictional character from Hunter × Hunter manga

- Hunter × Hunter character
- Killua Zoldyck, as illustrated by Yoshihiro Togashi
- First appearance: Hunter × Hunter manga chapter 6: "The First Phase Begins, Part 2" (1998)
- Created by: Yoshihiro Togashi
- Voiced by: Japanese: Kanako Mitsuhashi (1999 anime) Mariya Ise (2011 anime); English: Annika Odegard (1999 anime); Cristina Vee (2011 anime)

Killua Zoldyck (Japanese: キルア=ゾルディック, Hepburn: Kirua Zorudikku) is a fictional character from Hunter × Hunter, a manga series written by Yoshihiro Togashi. Killua is a skilled and rebellious twelve-year-old boy from the world's most notorious assassin family, the Zoldyck family. Bored and tired of killing, he meets Hunter × Hunter's young protagonist, Gon Freecss, during the first portion of an examination for people who wish to become "Hunters". Aiming to escape his family and his past, Killua joins Gon's quest to find his missing father, and they work together to become stronger fighters. As the story goes on, they become inseparable friends. Killua has also featured as a character in two films and several video games.

Killua was one of the first characters created in the making of Hunter × Hunter. Togashi created Killua to fill the role of Gon's friend, and much of the relationship between the two characters was inspired by the protagonist's personality and young age. In creating Killua, Togashi was also inspired by several anime and manga works that he enjoyed. In anime adaptations of the manga, Killua has been voiced by Kanako Mitsuhashi and Mariya Ise in Japanese and Annika Odegard and Cristina Vee in English. Killua became a popular character and an inspiration to both other manga artists, some of whom based characters on Killua, and readers who went on to do cosplay. Critics have praised his characterization, particularly the character arc in which he overcomes his brooding personality and becomes devoted to Gon. He has often been recognized as one of the best characters in the series.

== Creation ==
After creating the protagonist of the manga Hunter × Hunter, Gon Freecss, manga author Yoshihiro Togashi conceived two important characters: a friend and a villain of Gon. Killua was set to be Gon's friend, while the character Hisoka Morow would be Gon's antagonist. Togashi made Killua the same age as Gon in order to make the friendship between the two characters natural. He developed a rough sense of Killua's circumstances, such as that he would have superhuman physical abilities and be from a family of assassins, then designed Killua's appearance to fit his circumstances and background. Finally, Togashi wrote Killua interacting with Gon and the series' other two main characters, Leorio and Kurapika, and from this developed Killua's personality. Both Killua and Hiei from YuYu Hakusho were inspired by characters from the manga Patalliro! by Mineo Maya; Patalliro! was an influence on Togashi's work, as he read it and other yaoi works while working to write shōnen manga.

When deciding on his appearance, Togashi referred to multiple works he has enjoyed seeing. In the case of Killua, around the time that he was deciding what number child of the assassin family he would be, thoughts of Kuroyume's shōnen manga, Atsushi Kamijo, Multiple Personality Detective Psycho, among others, came to mind, and these led to his appearance. In the full-body illustration when he first appeared, there's a part where the outline is interrupted by light, and the artist made subtle references to Kamijō and Shou Tajima.

In the first animated adaptation of Hunter x Hunter by Nippon Animation, the staff was catching up to the printed adaptation and thus planned their own original ending. In this original scenario, Killua and Gon split after their friend Kurapika's death while facing criminals, and there is a timeskip of seven years until the final episode. In the final episode, a now adult Killua returns to Gon's home in Whale Island alongside his father under a job that would result in him killing Gon in the process. Upon being notified of this scenario, Togashi rejected the story, and the 1999 television series instead ended with Kurapika's reunion with his friends, which is followed in original video animations that follow the manga instead.

=== Casting ===
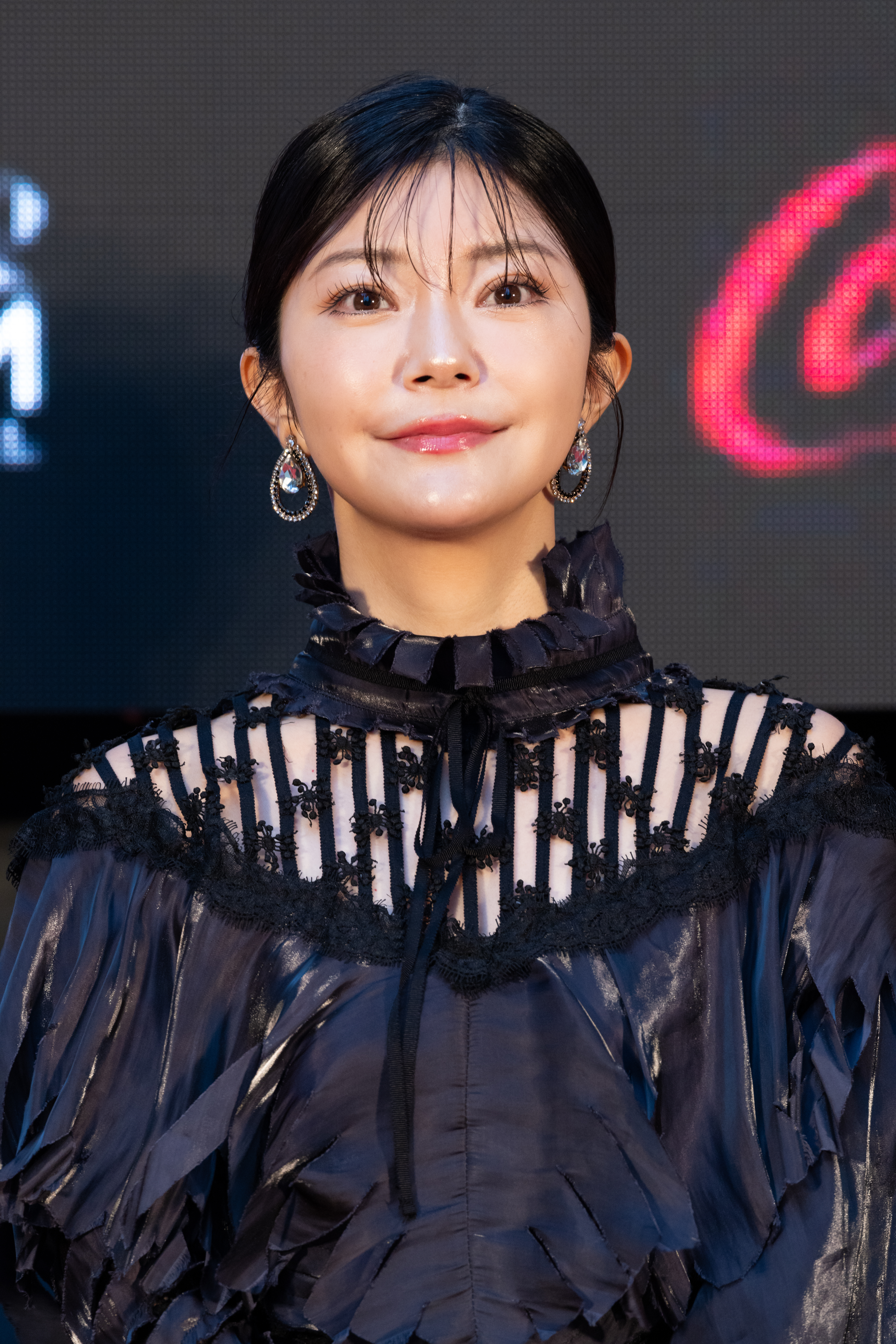
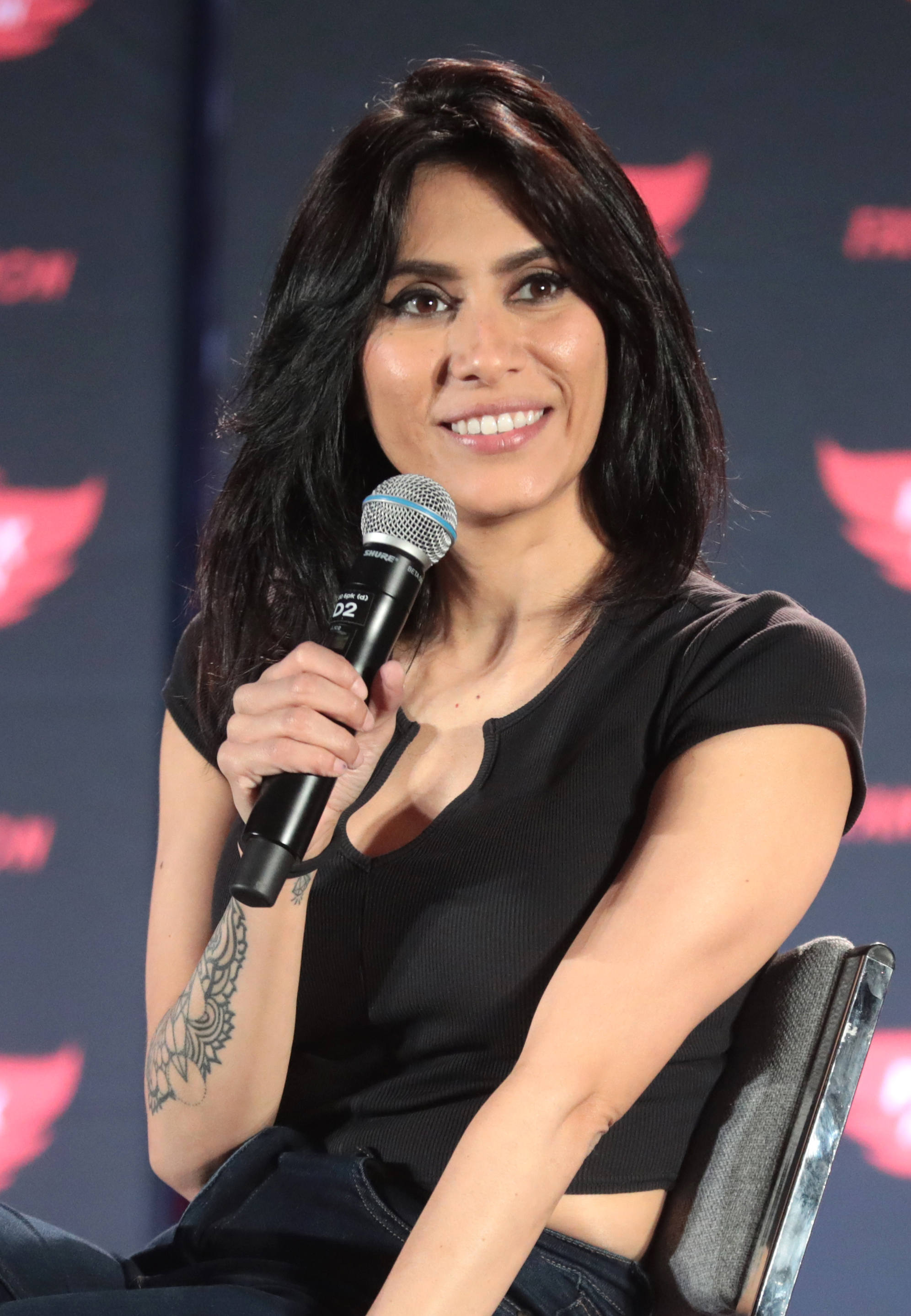
In the 2011 anime, Killua is voiced by Mariya Ise (left) in Japanese and by Cristina Vee (right) in English.

Killua is voiced by Kanako Mitsuhashi in the 1999 series and Mariya Ise in the 2011 series in Japanese. For the English dubs, Annika Odegard voices him in the 1999 series, and Cristina Vee in the 2011 series. Mitsuhashi said she found the work challenging, especially during the Greed Island Final original video animations, but still found it enjoyable to work beside Biscuit Krueger's actress, Chieko Higuchi, during this anime production, especially since their mentor developed a mother relationship with the two protagonists. Ise's performance was met with a positive response by Togashi himself on his Twitter account based on how carefully she portrayed Killua's sensitive side, much to her own surprise. She enjoyed the anime since her childhood, often cosplaying as Gon or the Naruto title character Naruto Uzumaki, but is not sure if she might get a chance to portray Killua again due to the manga taking a focus on other characters as Killua and Gon stopped being the focus of the series in the Dark Continent story arc.

Cristina Vee said that while Killua comes across as a happy child, he has a notable dark side as a result of the family that raised him. The actress was unaware of the series until she was cast to play Killua, which piqued her interest in the story. She originally auditioned for three characters, Gon, Killua, and Kurapika, and was accepted for Killua. She often saw cosplayers of Killua and Gon at fan conventions, attracted especially because the cosplayers were always duos.

== Appearances ==
=== In the Hunter × Hunter manga ===
Killua is initially introduced as a mischievous child who befriends the young protagonist Gon during the Hunters' examination.^{[ch. 6]} His ruthlessness and aptitude in killing show the other side of him—deadly, violent, and bloodthirsty. A member of the famous Zoldyck Family of assassins, Killua has been trained to be an assassin since birth and conditioned to possess extreme tolerance for poison, electricity, and overall pain. Conflicting with Killua's predisposition to kill is his unyielding loyalty to his new friends, as Killua puts them before himself without a single complaint. Showing great promise from birth, he possesses extraordinary agility and strength as a one-man killing machine. Killua has mastered numerous killing techniques at a tender age and is set to be one of the best assassins his family has ever produced. Although Killua fails during his first Hunter Exam by killing an opponent due to his elder brother Illumi's influence, he attends the exam again the following year, earning his license by eliminating all other applicants in the very first trial.^{[ch. 36, 37, 148]}

While training in an arena to earn money, Killua and Gon learn about the energy called Nen from a Hunter called Wing.^{[ch. 47, 48, 137]} Killua's Nen type is Transmutation, which he utilizes by altering his aura into electricity, aided also by his resistance his body had due to his violent upbringing.^{[ch. 60, 122]} From there, Killua accompanies Gon on his journey to find his missing father, Ging, who left a clue in the form of a memory from a rare video game called Greed Island.^{[ch. 69]} After helping Kurapika with dealing with a criminal organization known as the Spider,^{[ch. 166]} Killua and Gon "enter into" Greed Island, which was found in an auction. They are actually transported to lands maintained by Nen users trained further under Biscuit Krueger. Killua develops his Hatsu, which involves various uses of electricity to increase his physical capabilities, such as Godspeed (神速, Kanmuru), which allows him to move at immeasurable speeds. In fights that take place during Greed Island, Killua's hands are wounded, forcing him to use yoyos as weapons in place of electricity.^{[ch. 281]}^{[ch. 145, 182]}

After becoming one of the first people to beat Greed Island, Killua and Gon use their prize to find Ging but instead end up finding him and Gon's mentor, Kite.^{[ch. 184, 185]} They help stop the Chimera Ants, where Killua fears being killed several times when facing more powerful enemies than him,^{[ch. 210]} a result of Illumi's instructions to be extremely cautious and only engage in combat if victory is absolutely certain. Upon being confronted with the idea of losing Gon, Killua faces his fears and removes Illumi's needle.^{[ch. 218]} Killua and Gon join a group to exterminate the Chimera Ant Exterminators and save Kite, but Gon's rage over the latter's state depresses Killua. Following the Chimera's defeat, Killua frees his sibling Alluka Zoldyck to use the special abilities to heal the dying Gon following the battle with the Chimera Neferpitou.^{[ch. 322]} This causes another fight between Killua and his family, but he manages to escape from Illumi. After Gon is healed, Killua has him apologize for his recent rude demeanor. As Gon completes his journey and meets Ging, Killua decides to part ways and travel the world with Alluka.^{[ch. 335,336]}

=== Other media ===
In the film Hunter × Hunter: Phantom Rouge, Killua and Gon help Kurapika in a mission to recover his eyes taken by his childhood friend. He is also present in Hunter × Hunter: The Last Mission, where he and his friends protect the fighting arena from "Shadow", the Hunter Association's black ops squad that was destroyed by the Chairman Isaac Netero. The character is also playable in Hunter × Hunter: Nen × Impact. Outside Hunter x Hunter, Killua also appears in the crossover fighting games such as Jump Super Stars, Jump Ultimate Stars, J-Stars Victory VS, and Jump Force.

== Reception ==
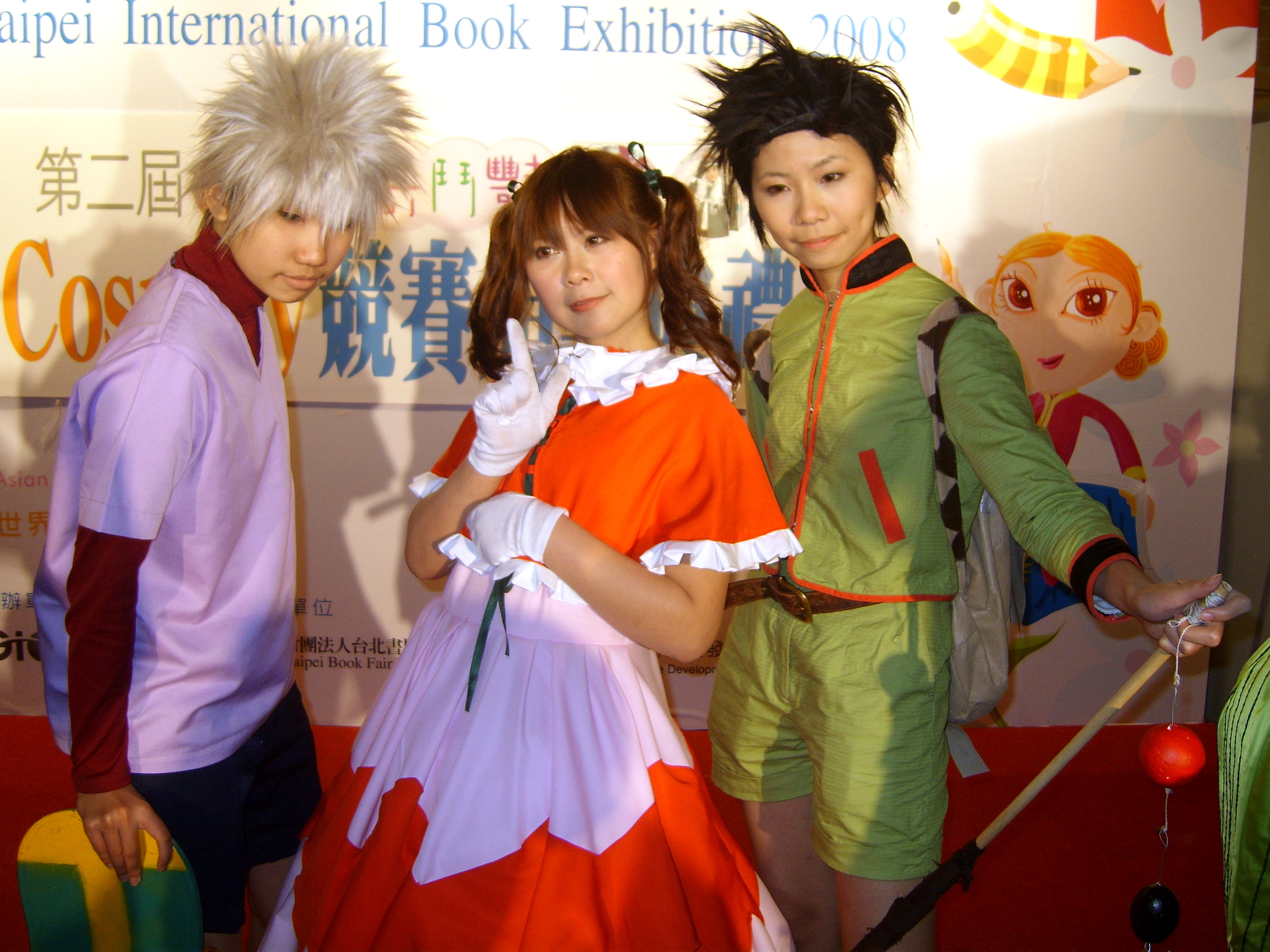
From left to right: cosplay of Killua, Biscuit Krueger, and Gon Freecss

The character has appeared in first place in the series' first two popularity polls. Killua was one of the five recipients for the "Best Boys of the Decade" category in the Funimation's Decade of Anime fan poll. In an Anitrendz poll, he was voted as one of the best male characters from the 2010s. The character has often been compared with Satoru Gojo from Jujutsu Kaisen due to physical and personality similarities. When Mariya Ise was cast to portray the younger Gojo in a flashback from the anime's second season, Hindustan Times said the "meme came to life" as Ise was also popular for voicing Gojo in his youth, and fans were happy with such casting. The character has also been the subject of cosplay within the anime fandom. Jujutsu Kaisen manga author Gege Akutami was also influenced by Killua's character when he saw the deteriorated state Gon was brought down in after using his entire health to defeat the Chimera Pitou. This resulted in a similar scene from Jujutsu Kaisen where the protagonist, Yuji Itadori, stares at his friend, Megumi Fushiguro, in horror when he becomes the new vessel of the villain, Ryomen Sukuna. Reebok has also created marketing using Killua's image.

In regards to critical response, THEM Anime Reviews found Killua's brooding personality as a counterpoint for Gon's kind personality, and their friendship felt appealing. Website Polygon listed Killua as one of their "favorite boys" in on how determined he is to help Gon across the series as a result of their friendship, to the point he comes across as the more likable character from the duo. Comic Book Resources said that the first animated version of Hunter x Hunter gave Killua a different characterization from the manga's, often coming across as a tsundere archetype, shy to express his feelings for Gon and often clashing with his dark childhood origins when meeting Gon early in the series. This often made the first Killua harder to like than Togashi and Madhouse's takes. The same website said that while there are several moments Killua stands out thanks to his developed characterization, such as his bonding with Alluka or Gon, there are also counterpoints where the dark influences of the Zoldyck upbringing he had resulted in his character acting in a more negative manner. While reviewing the film Hunter × Hunter: Phantom Rouge, Anime News Network criticized his weaker portrayal in the film as he is often scared by the antagonists and lamented the movie never ends this arc the character is supposed to face.

For the arc where the cast battles the Chimeras, The Fandom Post said that Killua became more likable than Gon due to Gon become antagonistic to the Chimeras and hurting Killua's feelings during his emotional outbursts. Anime News Network also noted that Killua started coming across as a better protagonist than Gon during this story arc as a result of Gon's anger overshadowing his own likable traits, making Killua more reasonable. In analysis of such an arc, Polygon said the narrative the characters are into continuously tests Gon's and Killua's relationship as the former becomes selfish in his quest to save Kite until it is made impossible for the duo to be together. Michaela Bakker of Victoria University of Wellington said about the following arc that Killua is shown to be the only member of his family to care about Alluka's well-being, giving the impression of accepting the apparent transgender sibling since the gender identity of Alluka is presented in a subtle fashion by the family who locked the child while Killua wishes his sibling to be free regardless of gender.
