= Hunter × Hunter: Phantom Rouge =

2013 film by Yūzō Satō

- Theatrical release poster
- Directed by: Yūzō Satō
- Written by: Shōji Yonemura
- Based on: Hunter × Hunter by Yoshihiro Togashi
- Produced by: Minami Ichikawa
- Cinematography: Shigeteru Asakawa
- Edited by: Satoshi Terauchi
- Music by: Yoshihisa Hirano
- Production company: Madhouse
- Distributed by: Toho
- Release date: January 12, 2013
- Running time: 97 minutes
- Country: Japan
- Language: Japanese
- Box office: US$12,595,288

Hunter × Hunter: Phantom Rouge (Japanese: 劇場版 Hunter×Hunter 緋色の幻影(ファントム・ルージュ), Hepburn: Gekijō-ban Hantā Hantā: Fantomu Rūju) is a 2013 Japanese animated feature film based on the Hunter × Hunter manga series by Yoshihiro Togashi. It follows the four main characters, Gon, Killua, Kurapika and Leorio as they face a dangerous individual who once was a member of their greatest enemies, the criminal organization known as the Phantom Troupe.

The film was created by Madhouse and opened at number one in Japan on January 12, 2013. Viz Media released the film on home video in North America on February 13, 2018.

== Plot ==
The movie begins with Killua having a nightmare about his brother Illumi's warning to never make friends, claiming that eventually he will betray or get betrayed by them. He wakes up alongside Gon on an airship, where the former promises to never betray him. Upon arriving at their destination, they meet Leorio and learn that he and Kurapika were investigating a rumor about a survivor of Kurapika's Kurta Clan until they meet a young boy whom Kurapika recognized as his childhood friend Pairo, who attacks him and steals his eyes. Unconscious since then, Kurapika awakens beside the others and soon after he has visions through his stolen eyes of a man whose right palm is marked with a spider tattoo, the same used by the members of the Phantom Troupe.

Based on other details seen by Kurapika in his vision, Gon and Killua leave him under Leorio's care and split up in search for Pairo's location. Gon ends up meeting and befriending a young puppeteer called Retsu and when Killua reunites with him, they realize that Retsu is a girl. Because of Killua's loyalty towards Gon, Killua quickly becomes jealous of her. When night falls, Leorio and Kurapika are approached by Hisoka while Gon and the others are attacked by Uvogin, who was presumed to be dead and saved by Nobunaga and Machi who defeat him. It is then revealed that Uvogin was revived as a puppet by Omokage, a former member of the Phantom Troupe who was defeated and replaced by Hisoka. Omokage sends a team of puppets including one based on Pakunoda to attack his former companions but they are all destroyed by them. After Omokage retreats, Nobunaga and Machi leave as well, warning Gon and Killua to not stand between Omokage and the Phantom Troupe as they have a score to settle with him.

In the next day, Retsu leads Gon and Killua to the mansion from Kurapika's vision and after leaving her behind for her safety, they meet another puppet, now based on Illumi who attacks them. Just as the Illumi doll is about to steal Killua's eyes, Gon intervenes and has his own eyes stolen instead. Ashamed for failing to protect Gon and believing that he had betrayed his friend, Killua flees and attempts suicide but is saved by Gon who had tracked him with his acute sense of smell. Gon then reveals that he had let the Illumi doll steal his eyes by his own volition so they could track down Omokage. He also states that he had long realized that Retsu was one of his puppets as well. Reunited with Leorio and Kurapika, they set for Omokage's location to confront him.

Back at his hideout, Omokage reclaims his eyes from Retsu, who is revealed to be a puppet made from his deceased sister and when Gon and his friends appear, he reveals that he let them track him down by purpose as he intends to claim Leorio and Killua's eyes to use on his puppets as well. After confessing to Kurapika that he also took part in the Kurta Clan's massacre and claiming that he currently has no other scarlet eyes in his possession, Omokage sends the Pairo and Illumi dolls to attack the Hunters, but Gon and Kurapika defeat them with Leorio and Killua's help and retrieve their eyes. However, Omokage activates six other dolls based on members of the Phantom Troupe to attack them but Hisoka appears to fight by their side. While Hisoka deals with three of the puppets, Omokage absorbs the other three to attain their powers and fight Gon and co. until they join forces in a combined effort that allows Kurapika to successfully restrain him with his chain.

With Omokage defeated, Kurapika offers him a chance to be spared in exchange for having his powers sealed for life, but he refuses. Killua offers himself to kill Omokage in Kurapika's place but the puppeteer is then stabbed by Retsu, who claims that he had already caused enough suffering to her and her friends. The real Phantom Troupe arrives soon after, but they decide to let Kurapika and Hisoka leave, claiming that they will settle their scores with them in another day. As the whole place is put on fire, Retsu decides to let herself be consumed by the flames along her brother and thanks Gon and Killua for the moments they spent with her. Some time later, Gon and Killua part ways with their friends as they leave to continue their adventures together.

== Cast and characters ==
Character	Japanese voice actor	English voice actor
Gon Freecss	Megumi Han	Erica Mendez
Killua Zoldyck	Mariya Ise	Cristina Vee
Kurapika	Miyuki Sawashiro	Erika Harlacher
Leorio Paradinight	Keiji Fujiwara	Matthew Mercer
Omokage	Naohito Fujiki	Joe Zieja
Retsu	Aya Hirano	Kayli Mills
Hisoka Morow	Daisuke Namikawa	Keith Silverstein
Illumi Zoldyck	Masaya Matsukaze	Chris Hackney
Pairo	Umika Kawashima	Laura Stahl
Nobunaga Hazama	Naoya Uchida	Joe J. Thomas
Machi Komachine	Rena Maeda	Abby Trott
Uvogin	Akio Ohtsuka	Patrick Seitz
Pakunoda	Romi Park	Erica Lindbeck
Phinks	Kenn	David Vincent
Franklin	Hidenobu Kiuchi	Edward Bosco
Feitan	Kappei Yamaguchi	Tom Bauer
Chrollo Lucilfer	Mamoru Miyano	Robbie Daymond
Shalnark	Noriko Hidaka	Griffin Burns
Shizuku	Miho Arakawa	Janice Roman Roku

== Development ==
In March 2012, a source linked to the Hunter × Hunter anime told Mainichi Shimbun that a theatrical film had been green-lit. The year's 34 issue of Weekly Shōnen Jump, released in July 2012, included the first image for Gekijō-ban Hunter × Hunter Phantom Rouge. It depicts Kurapika's "rouge" or scarlet eye with the number four reflecting in it and revealed that the "dramatic action" film would feature the Phantom Troupe. The film's plot is based on an unpublished story creator Yoshihiro Togashi wrote around 10 years earlier. Days later, the official website for the movie went live and streamed a teaser trailer that was also shown on television. An August issue of the magazine outlined the story and revealed the second visual image. The first theatrical trailer was released in September.

In October, the year's 48 issue of Jump unveiled the movie original character and number four of the Phantom Troupe, Omokage (オモカゲ). Actresses Aya Hirano and Umika Kawashima voice the new characters Retsu (レツ) and Pairo (パイロ) respectively, while music duo Yuzu provides the theme song "Reason". A second teaser was posted to the website in November. Tickets for the film, to be released on January 12, 2013, went on sale on November 3 and included clear file folders featuring artwork from the series while supplies lasted.

Hunter × Hunter creator Yoshihiro Togashi wrote the two-part manga Kurapika Tsuioku-hen (クラピカ追憶編; "Kurapika Recollection") to act as a prequel to the film. A collected version of the story, referred to as "Volume 0" of the series, was given to the first million moviegoers. A novel adaptation of the film, written by Hajime Tanaka, was released by Shueisha on January 15, 2013.

== Release ==
Hunter × Hunter: Phantom Rouge opened in 257 screens on January 12, 2013, and debuted at number one in the Japanese box office with 357,976 tickets sold and earning 456,779,000 yen (about US$5,143,930). Phantom Rouge grossed however fell 68.6% to only $1,655,960 in its second weekend and losing number one to Ted. It earned a total of US$12,595,288 by its sixth weekend. The home video DVD of the movie was released on July 7, 2013, selling 4,783 copies its first week for fifth place on Oricon's Japan Animation DVD chart. It sold 7,308 copies in four weeks before falling off the chart. The film received its television debut on Nippon TV on December 27, 2013, at 2:38 am, earning a 0.7% average household rating.

The movie received its United States premiere on August 3, 2013, at the first Japan Film Festival of San Francisco. The Scotland Loves Anime festival screened the film in October 2013. In July 2017, Viz Media announced they had licensed Phantom Rouge for distribution in North America, and released it with an English language dub on February 13, 2018.
