= Hunter × Hunter =

Japanese manga series

- First tankōbon volume cover, featuring Gon Freecss above a large frog
- Genre: Adventure; Fantasy; Martial arts
- Manga
- Written by: Yoshihiro Togashi
- Published by: Shueisha
- English publisher: NA: Viz Media
- Imprint: Jump Comics
- Magazine: Weekly Shōnen Jump
- English magazine: NA: Weekly Shonen Jump
- Original run: March 3, 1998 – present
- Volumes: 39
- Anime film

Hunter × Hunter – Jump Super Anime Tour 98
- Directed by: Noriyuki Abe
- Produced by: Ken Hagino; Tetsuo Daitoku
- Written by: Hiroshi Hashimoto
- Studio: Studio Pierrot
- Released: July 26, 1998
- Runtime: 26 minutes
- Anime television series
- 1999–2001 series; Original video animations (2002–2004); 2011–2014 series
- Anime films
- Hunter × Hunter: Phantom Rouge (2013); Hunter × Hunter: The Last Mission (2013)
- icon

Hunter × Hunter (pronounced "hunter hunter") is a Japanese manga series written and illustrated by Yoshihiro Togashi. It has been serialized in Shueisha's shōnen manga magazine Weekly Shōnen Jump since March 1998, although the manga has frequently gone on extended hiatuses since 2006. Its chapters have been collected in 39 tankōbon volumes as of July 2026. The manga has been licensed for English release in North America by Viz Media.

The story follows a young boy named Gon Freecss who discovers that his father, who left him at a young age, is actually a world-renowned Hunter, a licensed professional who specializes in fantastical pursuits such as locating rare or unidentified animal species, treasure hunting, surveying unexplored enclaves, or hunting down lawless individuals. This then motivates Gon to depart from his home on Whale Island to become a Hunter and eventually find his father through a perilous journey.

Hunter × Hunter was adapted into a 62-episode anime television series by Nippon Animation and directed by Kazuhiro Furuhashi, which aired on Fuji Television from October 1999 to March 2001. Three separate original video animations (OVAs) totaling 30 episodes were subsequently produced by Nippon Animation and released in Japan from 2002 to 2004. A second anime television series by Madhouse aired on Nippon Television from October 2011 to September 2014, totaling 148 episodes, with two animated theatrical films released in 2013. There are also numerous audio albums, video games, musicals, and other media based on Hunter × Hunter.

Hunter × Hunter has been widely acclaimed and commercially successful, becoming one of the best-selling manga series of all time, with over 100 million copies in circulation worldwide by June 2026.

== Synopsis ==
=== Setting ===
In the world of Hunter × Hunter, Hunters (ハンター, Hantā) are licensed, elite members of humanity who are capable of tracking down secret treasures, rare beasts, or even other individuals, and can also access locations that regulars cannot. To obtain a license, one must pass the rigorous annual Hunter Examination run by the Hunter Association, which has a success rate of less than one in a hundred-thousand. A Hunter may be awarded up to three stars: a single star for making "remarkable achievements in a particular field"; they may then be upgraded to two stars for "holding an official position" and mentoring another Hunter up to single star level; and finally upgraded to three stars for "remarkable achievements in multiple fields".

Nen (念) is the ability to control one's own life energy or aura, which is constantly emitted from them, knowingly or not. There are four basic Nen techniques: Ten (纏) maintains the aura in the body, strengthening it for defense; Zetsu (絕) shuts the aura flow off, useful for concealing one's presence and relieving fatigue; Ren (練) enables a user to produce more Nen; and Hatsu (發) is a person's specific use of Nen. Nen users are classified into six types based on their Hatsu abilities; Enhancers (強化系, Kyōkakei) strengthen and reinforce their natural physical abilities; Emitters (放出系, Hōshutsukei) project aura out of their bodies; Manipulators (操作系, Sōsakei) control objects or living things; Transmuters (変化系, Henkakei) change the type or properties of their aura; Conjurers (具現化系, Gugenkakei) create objects out of their aura; and Specialists (特質系, Tokushitsukei) have unique abilities that do not fall into the previous categories. A Nen user can enter into a Contract (誓約, Seiyaku) where, by pledging to follow certain Limitations (制約, Seiyaku), their abilities are strengthened in relation to how strict they are. An example of this is Kurapika who, in order to have an unbreakable chain that will fully restrain members of the Phantom Troupe, offered his life, should he use it on anyone other than its members.

=== Plot ===
The story follows Gon Freecss, a young boy raised believing both his parents were dead. After discovering from Kite, an apprentice of his father Ging Freecss, that Ging is alive and a renowned Hunter, Gon leaves his home on Whale Island (くじら島, Kujira Tō) to undertake the Hunter Examination (ハンター試験, Hantā Shiken) and follow in his father's footsteps. During the exam, Gon befriends three other candidates: Kurapika, the last survivor of the Kurta clan seeking vengeance against the Phantom Troupe for slaughtering his people; Leorio, an aspiring physician pursuing the financial benefits of being a Hunter; and Killua Zoldyck, a former assassin from the infamous Zoldyck family. Among the examinees is Hisoka, a deadly transmuter who takes a keen interest in Gon. After numerous trials, Gon and his friends pass the exam, except for Killua, who fails after killing another applicant under his brother Illumi's influence and retreats to his family's estate.

After reuniting with Killua, Gon and his companions separate temporarily. Gon and Killua travel to Heavens Arena (天空闘技場, Tenkū Tōgijō), a towering martial arts arena where they train under Wing, a master who teaches them Nen, a Qi-like energy that unlocks parapsychological abilities and is the Hunter Exam's true final requirement. Later, the group reconvenes in Yorknew City (ヨークシンシティ, Yōkushin Shiti), where they clash with the Phantom Troupe. Kurapika kills two members and seals their leader Chrollo Lucilfer's powers, but is forced to abandon further pursuit to rescue Gon and Killua.

Gon and Killua later play Greed Island, a Nen-infused video game created by Ging, seeking clues to his whereabouts. Under the tutelage of Biscuit Krueger, they refine their Nen abilities. Killua briefly departs to retake and pass the Hunter Exam before rejoining Gon to complete the game, earning artifacts that lead them to Ging. Instead, they reunite with Kite, who is researching a man-eating Chimera Ant queen in the Neo-Green Life (N.G.L.) Autonomous Region. The queen's offspring, having learned Nen by consuming Hunters, overthrow the nearby Republic of East Gorteau (東ゴルトー共和国, Higashi Gorutō Kyouwakoku). Despite the efforts of the Hunter Association, including its president Netero, the Ant King Meruem proves formidable. Netero ultimately defeats Meruem with a suicide bomb, while Gon, driven by vengeance over Kite's death, overexerts his Nen to kill the Ant Neferpitou, leaving him critically injured.

After the Chimera Ant crisis, the Hunter Association's Zodiacs, including Ging, seek a new chairman. Killua retrieves his sister Alluka to heal Gon, overcoming his family's resistance and Illumi's interference. Gon eventually meets Ging, who reveals the purpose of his journey: to travel to the forbidden Dark Continent (暗黒大陸, Ankoku Tairiku).

Later, Netero's son Beyond organizes an expedition to the Dark Continent, backed by the Kingdom of Kakin. The world's major powers permit the expedition under strict oversight, with the Zodiacs supervising Beyond. Kurapika and Leorio join the Zodiacs, replacing Ging and Pariston Hill, who form independent teams. Meanwhile, Chrollo regains his Nen and defeats Hisoka, who, after being revived, begins assassinating Phantom Troupe members and sneaks aboard Kakin's ship, where surviving members of the troupe begin hunting him down, and a fight to the death between the 13 princes to decide the next king takes place. Kurapika, aboard as bodyguard to Prince Wobble, seeks to reclaim the Kurta clan's stolen scarlet eyes from Prince Tserriednich.

== Production ==
Author Yoshihiro Togashi stated that his hobby of collecting various objects inspired him to create a manga about collecting, initially conceptualized under the title "(something) Hunter". The final title, Hunter × Hunter, was conceived while Togashi watched the television variety show Downtown, where hosts often repeat phrases for comedic effect. The "×" in the title is silent. As with his previous series, YuYu Hakusho, Togashi used drafting ink and Kabura pens for illustrations, but began employing an eMac software for coloring. Togashi typically works with few or no assistants; however, fellow manga artist and future wife Naoko Takeuchi assisted in applying screentone to single-color pages for the first volume. The birth of their first son early in the manga's publication led Togashi to believe his personal life would significantly influence the work, particularly its theme of a young boy searching for his father.

Togashi has issued several apologies to readers in Shueisha's Weekly Shōnen Jump for substandard artwork, pledging to redraw certain sections for the tankōbon (collected volume) releases. Additionally, the serialization of Hunter × Hunter has been frequently interrupted by hiatuses since 2006, with long intervals between chapter releases. After a two-year hiatus ending in June 2014, and joining the English-language Weekly Shonen Jump, the series entered another hiatus two months later. Serialization resumed on April 18, 2016, but another hiatus began on July 4, 2016. The manga returned on June 26, 2017, entering on hiatus on August 31 of that same year. It resumed again on January 29, 2018, before another hiatus commenced on April 9. After a five-month hiatus, publication resumed from September 22 to November 26, 2018, before another hiatus began.

In May 2022, Togashi created a Twitter account and teased the manga's return. In July, he revealed that back and hip problems had prevented him from sitting for two years, forcing him to draw while lying down; in August, he announced an increase in staff, noting that background effects for chapter 399 were completed per his instructions and that chapter 400 would follow. The series resumed on October 24, 2022, after a hiatus of three years and eleven months—the longest in its history. On December 26, 2022, the manga entered another hiatus. The Weekly Shōnen Jump editorial department stated that, after consulting with Togashi, it was decided the manga should not continue a weekly serialization format; future details would be announced in the magazine. On March 9, 2023, Togashi tweeted that chapter 401 was completed, though the publication format remained undecided. On October 1, after nearly seven months, Togashi tweeted the phrase "Start over" alongside an image of a page corner with a ruler. On May 1, 2024, he shared a page numbered 5, indicating work on chapter 405. On July 22, he stated that background instructions for chapters 409 and 410 were ready for his assistants and teased progress up to chapter 416. The series resumed in Weekly Shōnen Jump from October 7 to December 9, 2024, before entering another hiatus. It resumed from June 29 to September 7, 2026, before taking another hiatus. In October 2026, Togashi announced that, due to physical and mental health issues, he would decline any future work requests with deadlines after completing his current commissions, allowing him to focus on his own manuscripts.

In November 2023, on TV Asahi's variety show, Iwakura and Yoshizumi Show, Togashi announced via a handwritten letter that he had planned four possible endings for the series. Only the fourth abandoned ending ("ending D") was revealed, intended as a contingency should he die before completing the manga. This ending features a time skip with Gon's granddaughter, Gin. Togashi expressed a desire to create a satisfactory conclusion to avoid using endings A, B, or C. He estimated reader reactions would be 80% positive for ending A, evenly split for ending B, and 90% negative for ending C. While acknowledging ending A as a safe choice, Togashi stated a personal preference for ending C, despite anticipating significant fan criticism.

== Media ==
=== Manga ===
Written and illustrated by Yoshihiro Togashi, Hunter × Hunter started its serialization in Shueisha's shōnen manga magazine Weekly Shōnen Jump on March 3, 1998. (Note: The series debuted in the magazine's 14th issue of 1998 (cover date March 16), released on March 3 of that same year.) Shueisha has collected its chapters into individual tankōbon volumes, with the first one released on June 4, 1998. As of July 3, 2026, 39 volumes have been released. The series has also been published in a sōshūhen edition that aims to recreate the manga as it was originally serialized in Weekly Shōnen Jump in the same size and with the color pages. Eleven volumes were released between December 9, 2011, and April 18, 2014, covering up to the Election story arc.

In April 2005, Viz Media began publishing the manga in English in North America. They market the series as part of their "Shonen Jump Advanced" line for older teens and young adults. Thirty-seven volumes have been released in North America as of October 3, 2023. On April 22, 2014, it was announced that Hunter × Hunter would be joining the digital English magazine Weekly Shonen Jump. In May 2024, Viz Media announced a 3-in-1 edition, with the first volume released on February 18, 2025.

==== Spin-offs ====
Kurapika's Memories (クラピカ追憶編, Kurapika Tsuioku-hen), a two-part manga Togashi wrote to act as a prequel to the first animated film, Phantom Rouge, was published in the December 3 and 10, 2012 issues of Weekly Shōnen Jump. The two chapters were collected into a single tankōbon, numbered Volume 0 of the series, that was given to the first one million theatergoers of the film. Viz included the Kurapika's Memories chapters in the December 17 and 24, 2012 issues of their digital English magazine Weekly Shonen Jump Alpha. Tokyo Ghoul author Sui Ishida created a 69-page storyboard of a manga chapter depicting the past of the character Hisoka. The storyboard was released digitally via Shōnen Jump+ on June 2, 2016.

=== Anime ===
==== 1999 series ====
A 62-episode anime television series adaptation, produced by Nippon Animation and directed by Kazuhiro Furuhashi, was broadcast on Fuji TV from October 16, 1999, to March 31, 2001.

===== Original video animations =====
The Nippon Animation series was followed by three original video animations (OVAs) that total 30 episodes. The first OVA series was directed by Satoshi Saga and comprises eight episodes across four volumes, released from January 17 to April 17, 2002. The second OVA series, Hunter × Hunter: Greed Island, was directed by Yukihiro Matsushita and comprises eight episodes across four volumes, released from February 19 to May 21, 2003. The third OVA series, Hunter × Hunter: G.I. Final, was directed by Makoto Sato and comprises 14 episodes across seven volumes, released from March 3 to August 18, 2004.

==== 2011 series ====
A second anime television series adaptation, produced by Madhouse and directed by Hiroshi Kōjina, was broadcast for 148 episodes on Nippon TV from October 2, 2011, to September 23, 2014.

=== Films ===
Before the first anime television series was created, a short film adaptation of Hunter × Hunter was shown as part of the 1998 "Jump Super Anime Tour" alongside similar adaptations of Seikimatsu Leader den Takeshi! and One Piece. Produced by Studio Pierrot and directed by Noriyuki Abe, it depicts the early events of the manga up to Gon's ocean voyage from Whale Island.

A film adaptation produced by Madhouse, titled Hunter × Hunter: Phantom Rouge, featuring an original story, was announced in March 2012. It was released on January 12, 2013, by Toho. It centers around Gon and his friends efforts to retrieve Kurapika's eyes which were stolen by Omokage, Hisoka's predecessor in the Phantom Troupe. The film is based on an unpublished manga story creator Yoshihiro Togashi wrote around 10 years before.

A second film, titled Hunter × Hunter: The Last Mission, was announced following the first one's debut. The film focuses somewhat on Netero, the chairman of the Hunter Association, as Gon and his friends discover the dark secrets behind his past. The movie was released on December 27, 2013, and the DVD and Blu-ray edition was released on July 23, 2014. At the Japanese box office, Phantom Rouge grossed $12,595,288, and The Last Mission grossed ¥850 million ($8.71 million), bringing both films' total Japanese box office gross to $21.31 million.

=== CDs ===
The background music for the first Hunter × Hunter anime and three OVA series was composed by Toshihiko Sahashi. A large number of audio CDs for the franchise have been released by Marvelous Entertainment. The three-volume soundtrack for the anime television series contains 129 instrumental and vocal songs. The Original Video Animation Hunter × Hunter Sound Trax for the first OVA series contains 18 songs and the Original Video Animation Hunter × Hunter: Greed Island Original Sound Tracks for the second OVA series contains 30 songs. In addition, character-specific and story arc drama CDs and a 17-volume radio drama titled Hunter × Hunter R have been published throughout the anime adaptations' release period.

=== Musicals and stage plays ===
A musical, titled Musical Hunter × Hunter (ミュージカル ハンター×ハンター), was performed at the Space Zero theater in Tokyo from December 2000 to January 2001. It is an original story that appears to take place between the end of the Yorknew City story arc and the beginning of the Greed Island arc. A second musical, Musical Hunter × Hunter: The Nightmare of Zaoldyeck (ミュージカル ハンター×ハンター ナイトメア・オブ・ゾルディック), was performed during August 2002 at the Space Zero in Tokyo and at the Sankei Hall in Osaka. It is a retelling of when Kurapika, Leorio, and Gon go to fetch Killua back from his family estate after the end of the Hunter Exam arc. Both musicals have received separate DVD and audio CD releases, as well as a dual DVD release from Marvelous Entertainment.

A stage play, titled Real Stage Hunter × Hunter: "A Longing for Phalcnothdk: A Spider's Memory" (リアルステージ ハンター×ハンター｢A Longing for Phalcnothdk 〜蜘蛛の記憶〜｣), was performed 16 times at the Theater Sun-mall in Tokyo during August 2004. The play is a retelling of the Phantom Troupe finale in the Yorknew City arc. It received a DVD release in Japan on December 10, 2004.

Another stage play, Hunter × Hunter: The Stage, was performed at the Galaxy Theatre in Tokyo from May 12–28, 2023. A second stage play, Hunter × Hunter: The Stage 2, was performed at the Galaxy Theatre in Tokyo from March 16–31, 2024, and at the Umeda Arts Theater Dramacity in Osaka from April 16–14. A third stage play, Hunter × Hunter: The Stage 3, adapting the manga Greed Island arc, ran at the Galaxy Theatre in Tokyo from May 17–25, 2025, and at the Sky Theater MBS in Osaka from June 7–15. A fourth stage play, Hunter × Hunter: The Stage 4, adapting the manga's Chimera Ant arc, is set to run its first part January 23 to February 21, 2027, and the second part from July to August in Tokyo and Kyoto.

=== Video games ===
There are ten Japan-exclusive video games based on Hunter × Hunter, many of which were either developed or published by Konami or Bandai. They range from role-playing and strategy games to action and adventure games. These include titles for the WonderSwan, WonderSwan Color, Game Boy Color, Game Boy Advance, PlayStation, and PlayStation 2.

A game based on the second anime adaptation was released on the PlayStation Portable on September 20, 2012. Characters from the franchise have appeared along with other Weekly Shōnen Jump properties in the fighting games Jump Super Stars and Jump Ultimate Stars for the Nintendo DS, J-Stars Victory VS for the PlayStation 3 and PlayStation Vita, and Jump Force for Windows, PlayStation 4 and Xbox One.

In December 2023, Eighting and Bushiroad Games announced a 3-on-3 tag team-based fighting video game based on the manga, titled Hunter × Hunter: Nen × Impact. It is set to be released for the PlayStation 5, Nintendo Switch, and Windows (via Steam). A demo was available to play at the Evo Japan 2024 event on April 27. Arc System Works will publish the game in North America. It was planned to be released in 2024; however, it was delayed due to the implementation of rollback netcode in the game—a mechanism that avoids the lag during online matches, and was released on July 17, 2025.

A mobile game, titled Hunter × Hunter: Nen × Survivor, developed by WonderPlanet and published by Bushiroad, is set to be released globally for iOS and Android devices on February 17, 2026.

=== Other merchandise ===
A series of three film books based on the first anime series and authored by Nobuaki Kishikan has been released by Shueisha from December 3, 1999, to August 24, 2001. A guidebook to the anime titled Hunter × Hunter Characters Book: World × Character × Blessing (Hunter × Hunter キャラクターズブック World × Character × Blessing) was published by Shueisha in January 2001. A guidebook to the manga titled Hunter × Hunter: Hunters Association Official World and Character Guide (Hunter × Hunter ハンター協会公式発行ハンターズ・ガイド) was published by the company on June 4, 2004. There is also an extensive trading card game by Bandai, action and trading figures, and various other collectables.

== Reception ==
The series ranked fourth on Takarajimasha's Kono Manga ga Sugoi! list of best manga of 2012. In November 2014, readers of Media Factory's Da Vinci magazine voted Hunter × Hunter as the eleventh greatest Weekly Shōnen Jump manga series of all time. In 2019, the series ranked seventh on Da Vinci's 19th annual "Book of the Year" list. On TV Asahi's Manga Sōsenkyo 2021 poll, in which 150,000 people voted for their top 100 manga series, Hunter × Hunter ranked eleventh.

=== Sales ===
The Hunter × Hunter manga has been largely commercially successful; it has sold over 60.6 million collected volumes in Japan by February 2012, making it Shueisha's eighth best-selling manga series. This number had grown to 66.3 million copies by 2014. The manga had over 72 million copies in circulation by December 2018; over 79 million copies in circulation by November 2021; over 84 million copies in circulation by July 2022; and over 100 million copies in circulation by June 2026. Several individual volumes have topped Oricon's list of the best-selling manga in Japan during their release week, such as volumes 30 through 36. Volumes 24, 27, and 30 through 34 were some of the top-selling volumes for their respective years. Hunter × Hunter was the eighth best-selling manga series of both 2012 and 2013, with 3.4 and 4.6 million copies sold those years respectively. In North America, volumes 23 through 27 have ranked within the top 300 best-selling graphics novels list of sales estimates by Diamond Comic Distributors.

=== Critical reception ===
Hunter × Hunter has received much praise for its plot and characters. In his 2007 book Manga: The Complete Guide, Jason Thompson described its storyline as "an almost random collection of psych-outs, battles, puzzles, and trickery" that works on both a chapter-by-chapter basis and a larger scale. Thompson elaborated that with all the goals and subplots of each of the main characters, the story could seemingly go on forever and is unpredictable enough to hold the reader's interest. In a different review for Anime News Network in 2012, Thompson wrote that it was hard to summarize the story because "it is every shōnen manga in one, with training sequences, tournament battles, a crime-mystery story arc, and a virtual-reality, RPG-style story arc". But unlike most shōnen manga, he called Hunter × Hunter "incredibly dense." Examples provided by Thompson include its fictional Nen ability, which he said was explained "so thoroughly that you almost think it could exist," and the challenges and games the characters face; "Over and over Togashi invents some little closed system or rules just so the heroes can break them; if he ever wants to change careers, I'd suggest game designer." Thompson praised the character art as great, pointing out how, instead of alternating between realistic and chibi like other artists, Togashi had cartoony and realistically designed characters interacting in the same panels. Thompson noted how the artwork during its magazine run was often "sketchy" and missing backgrounds, but that Togashi went back and fixed it for its collected tankōbon release. Mentioning Togashi's love of gore, he stated "the whole manga is about the mixture of childish adventure and creepy, adult themes" and noted how some panels later in the manga apparently censor the gore by covering it with screentone.

Reviewing the first story arc, Chris Sims of ComicsAlliance called Hunter × Hunter one of the most "fun, ridiculous, and ludicrously violent comics I've ever read." He stated that while it has every shōnen manga idea in force, what stuck out the most is the violence. Sims summed it up as "full of clever setups and characters that, while simple to the point of almost seeming one-dimensional at times, still manage to be solid and entertaining based on their reaction to the increasingly strange, increasingly deadly events around them". Charles Solomon, a writer for The New York Times and Los Angeles Times, praised the moral seriousness of Gon, a quality that gave the protagonist "an appeal his relentlessly upbeat counterparts lack". Publishers Weekly gave a positive review to the first volume of the manga, stating that Togashi "shows a deft touch" with its standard story, calling his artwork "clear and graceful", and mentioning that his characters are "endearing and complex". While Rika Takahashi of EX.org and Claude J. Pelletier of Protoculture Addicts found the art style in Hunter × Hunter to be much simpler than Togashi's two previous manga series, Level E and YuYu Hakusho, both reviewers praised the intricate narrative and characters.
