= Gon Freecss =

Fictional character from Hunter × Hunter manga

- Hunter × Hunter character
- Gon, as illustrated by Yoshihiro Togashi
- First appearance: Hunter × Hunter manga chapter 1: "The Day of Departure" (1998)
- Created by: Yoshihiro Togashi
- Voiced by: Japanese: Rica Matsumoto (1998 film); Junko Takeuchi (1999 series); Megumi Han (2011 series); English: Elinor Holt (1999 series); Erica Mendez (2011 series)

In-universe information
- Family: Unnamed great-grandmother Ging Freecss (father); Mito (aunt)

Gon Freecss (Japanese: ゴン=フリークス, Hepburn: Gon Furīkusu) is a fictional character and the protagonist of the manga series Hunter × Hunter, created by Yoshihiro Togashi. Gon is a young boy who discovers his father, Ging, who left Gon at a young age, is actually a world-renowned Hunter, a licensed professional who specializes in locating rare or unidentified animal species, treasure hunting, surveying unexplored enclaves, and hunting criminals. Gon departs on a journey to become a Hunter and find his father: along the way, Gon meets other Hunters and encounters paranormal phenomena.

Togashi originally created Gon as an ideal son, but after seeing the character's backstory, Togashi changed Gon's characterization to appear as a selfish teenager due to the way he starts his quest. Several voice actors have played Gon in animated adaptations of Hunter × Hunter; the character appears in two film adaptations, helping his friend Kurapika recover his eyes in the first one and protect an arena in the second one.

Despite initial mixed reviews about the character's simplicity, Gon has been well received by critics, who praised his likability and close relationship with Killua Zoldyck. This friendship, however, resulted in several critics expressing multiple opinions about his character development in the Chimera story arc of the series, where Gon's rage makes him a less sympathetic lead than Killua's.

== Creation and development ==
When creating the protagonist of the manga series Hunter × Hunter, Yoshihiro Togashi aimed to give him a major contrast from his previous works since he planned the series a longer work. As a result, Gon was written as a more simplified to protagonist than Yusuke Urameshi from YuYu Hakusho and other works in order to easily fit in several arc where there is a major focus on the antagonists. Togashi thought Gon Freecss should be an ideal son who would easily become the series' most popular character. As he elaborated on the story, his idea of Gon changed; he did not see Gon as the nice person he originally envisioned because Gon abandons his foster mother Mito just to learn to be a Hunter like his father Ging. Gon and Ging were intended to be similar characters, with Gon often feeling nervous. This led to a major change in the series' main character of the series and left his scrapped nature to another unspecified member from the series instead. Togashi had a rough idea of the setting, and felt he could continue the story as long as he started with Gon taking the Hunter Examinations. Togashi planned storyboards in which Gon's Hunter Exam ended in failure. After he discussed it with his editor, the idea of Gon failing the exam was rejected. When planning the manga, two important aspects of Gon were decided; Killua Zoldyck would be his friend, and Hisoka Morow would be his enemy. Killua's personality was then shaped by his constant interactions with Gon.

Togashi addressed Gon's personality during fight scenes; he scrapped Gon's sensitive nature and gave the manga a more entertaining aspect. Togashi feels glad he transformed Gon into the series' protagonist because he could deal with Gon's personality. Instead Togashi gave Gon's calmness to the character Leorio. Togashi had the idea of having the characters' abilities connect with their personalities; Kurapika's chains are connected with his tragic backstory. Gon's abilities were also connected with his abilities and instincts. Originally, the series' plot would involve the use of trading cards as weapons. However, similarities with Kazuki Takahashi's Yu-Gi-Oh led to this being scrapped. Examples of fights using cards can be seen during the Greed Island story arc, in which Gon and Killua often use cards to cast magic spells.

In the first animated adaptation of Hunter x Hunter by Nippon Animation, the staff was catching up to the printed adaptation and thus planned their own original ending. In this original scenario, Killua and Gon split after Kurapika's death while facing criminals, and there is a timeskip of 7 years until the final episode. In the final episode, a now adult Killua returns to Gon's home in Whale Island alongside his father under a job which would result in him killing Gon in the process. Upon being notified of this scenario, Togashi rejected the story and the 1999 television series instead ended with Kurapika's reunion with his friends which is followed in original video animations that follow the manga instead. In 2023, Togashi showed planned ending of the manga in a Japanese TV show. Following a time skip, years into the future, it features Gon's granddaughter Gin while the older Gon is absent from home. Togashi wanted to create a satisfying-enough conclusion so he would not have to resort to endings he called A, B, or C. Togashi stated the readers' reactions, but it reached mixed opinions from the audience.

=== Casting ===
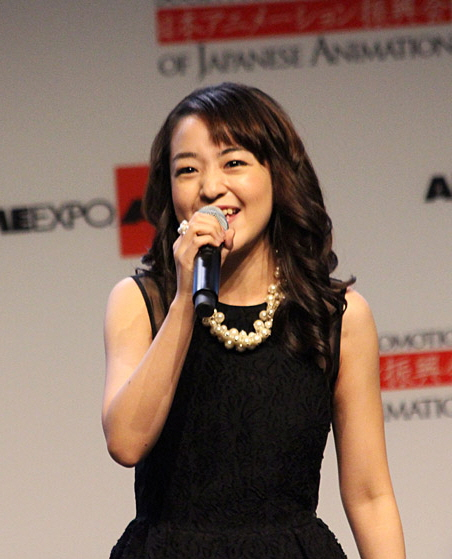
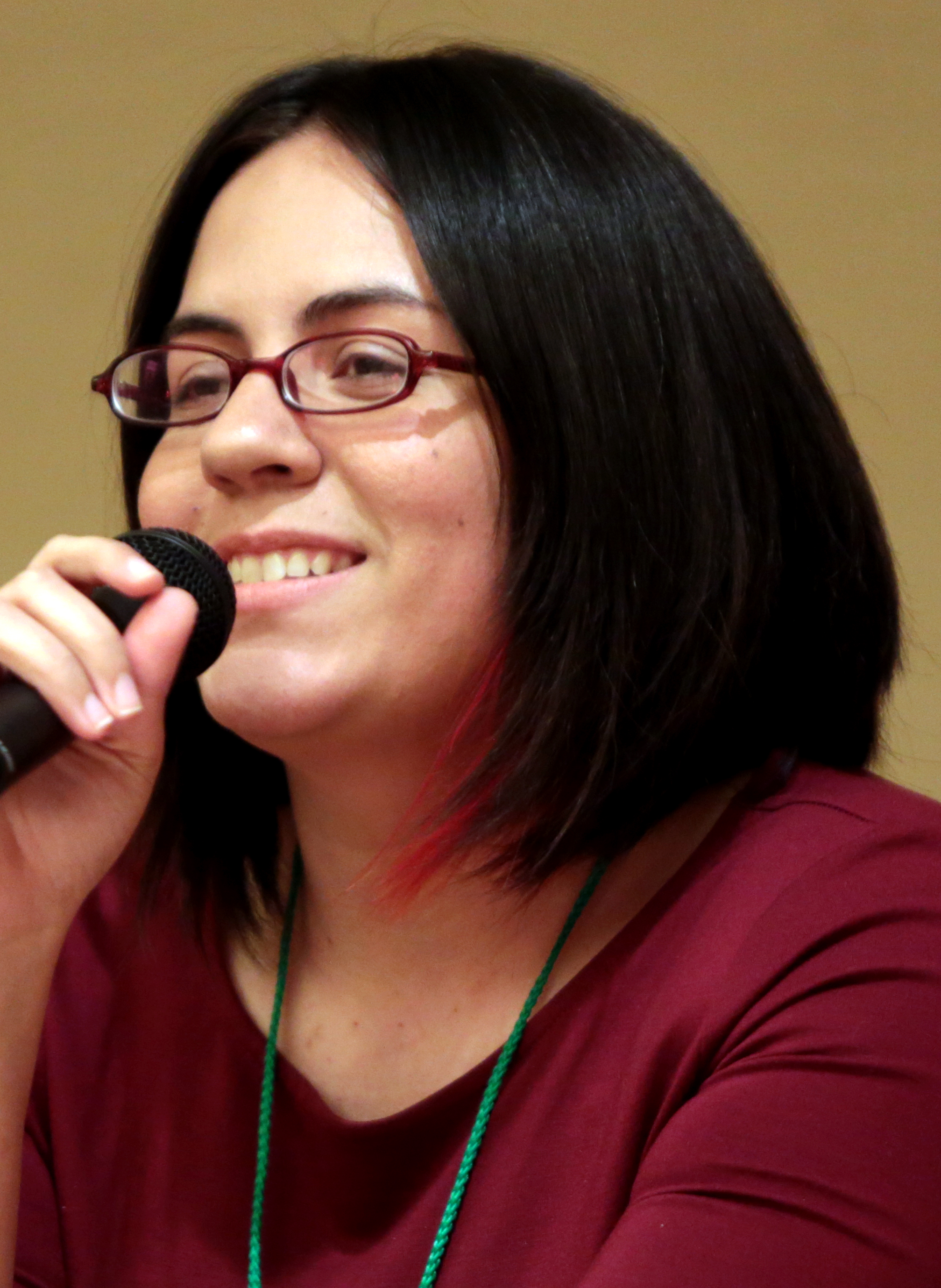
Megumi Han (left/top) and Erica Mendez (right/bottom), the respective Japanese and English voice actresses for Gon in the 2011 anime.

In a 1999 Japanese adaptation of Hunter x Hunter, Gon was voiced by Rica Matsumoto, and in a 1999 television series by Junko Takeuchi. Elinor Holt voiced him in the English dub of the 1999 series. Takeuchi enjoyed working with Killua's and Biscuit's voice actor during this anime production.

In the Madhouse adaptation of the series, Gon is voiced by Megumi Han. During casting, the voice actor Erica Mendez originally read for Gon, Killua, Kurapika, and Menchi; she enjoyed Gon's personality and how well he judges others but did not like Gon's penchant for danger and lack of regard for his own well-being. While voicing the character, Mendez adds raspiness to sound more believable to the audience. Gon's voice is not very raspy unless he is in a tense situation, and sometimes seems feminine, naïve, and happy.

== Appearances ==
=== In the Hunter × Hunter manga ===
Gon Freecss is an athletic, naïve, and friendly boy who was raised on Whale Island by his aunt Mito. Gon spent much time in the woods as a child, giving him heightened senses and an affinity for animals. A chance encounter with the Hunter Kite, the disciple of Gon's father Ging, inspires Gon to become a Hunter and find Ging. During the Hunter Exam, Gon befriends Killua Zoldyck, Kurapika, and Leorio Paradinight while being antagonised by the magician Hisoka. After becoming licensed Hunters, Gon and Killua learn about the power of Nen from a man named Wing. Gon competes in a tournament to test his new powers against Hisoka.^{[ch. 47, 48, 137]} Gon's Nen type is Enhancement, which gives him great strength and recuperative abilities.^{[ch. 60]} Although Gon loses the match, he repays a debt to Hisoka for helping him pass the Hunter Exam. Gon and Killua return to Whale Island to visit Mito, who reveals to Gon a recorded message from Ging that prompts Gon to try his Greed Island video game, a digital collectible card game which Ging created alongside several Hunters.^{[ch. 69]}

While searching for copies of Greed Island in Yorknew City, Gon and Killua are sidetracked while helping Kurapika fight the criminal Phantom Troupe to avenge his massacred clan. After helping Kurapika seal the Nen powers of Troupe leader Chrollo Lucilfer,^{[ch. 166]} Gon and Killua find an entrance to Greed Island, which teleports players to an island coordinated by Ging's friends. There, they train under Biscuit Krueger, Wing's mentor. Gon develops his Nen's special technique, the "Hatsu" Ja Jan Ken (ジャジャン拳), a play on "Janken", the Japanese word for rock-paper-scissors.^{[ch. 207]} When Gon throws out "Rock", it enhances his punch, "Scissors" transmutes a sword from his fingers for mid-range attacks, and "Paper" emits a ball of aura for long-range attacks.^{[ch. 145, 193, 209]} Gon develops and uses this technique while facing other players of Greed Island, including Razor, a criminal hired by Ging, and Genthuru, the leader of a murderous trio of players known as the "Bombers".^{[ch. 145, 182]}

After Gon, Killua and Biscuit become the first players to beat Greed Island, Gon returns to the outside world with Killua and reunites with Kite.^{[ch. 184, 185]} They travel to East Gorteau and discover the hostile Chimera Ants, who eat powerful creatures to gain their characteristics. When the Chimera Ant Neferpitou attacks them, Kite covers Gon's and Killua's escape and goes missing in action.^{[ch. 199]} After training his Ja Jan Ken again, Gon and a group of Hunters go to fight the Ants, but are horrified when Kite's corpse is recovered and reanimated by Neferpitou. During the Hunters' raid on Meruem's palace, Gon confronts Neferpitou, who pleads with him to wait while they heal a human named Komugi under Meruem's orders. Gon forces them to quickly complete the surgery and takes them to revive Kite. In an outburst of rage, Gon vents his anger on Killua, which hurts his feelings. Kite is revealed to have been killed by Neferpitou and his body rebuilt into a manipulated puppet to train the Chimera Ants, all while being reborn as a Chimera Ant.^{[ch. 222]} When Neferpitou reveals they cannot heal Kite and declares their intent to kill Gon, Gon is angered and enters into a Nen Contract to acquire "all the power [he]'ll ever have". This temporarily transforms him into an adult-like form to kill Neferpitou, but almost kills Gon.^{[ch. 305, 306, 324]}

Killua rescues Gon and takes him to a hospital until he finds a way to treat him. After being healed by Killua's sister Alluka Zoldyck's ability, Gon meets Ging in an election and expresses his sadness for letting Kite be defeated. Ging and the reborn Kite scold Gon for taking responsibility, but make peace with him.^{[ch. 335]} After Gon apologizes to Killua for his actions, the two split, and Gon meets with his father in the world's tallest tree. Upon meeting Ging, Gon asks why he became a Hunter, to which his father replies to discover new lands and treasures with his friends.^{[ch. 333, 338]} Gon returns to Whale Island and reunites with Mito, feeling unfit for a relationship with a father. As a consequence of his contract, Gon has lost the ability to use Nen.^{[ch. 345]} Having become a normal human again, Mito decides to educate Gon properly.

=== Other appearances ===
Besides appearing in the manga and its anime adaptations, Gon appears in two animated movies. In Hunter × Hunter: Phantom Rouge (2013), Gon and Killua search to restore Kurapika's missing eyes. Gon meets and befriends a young puppeteer called Retsu. Uvogin, who was presumed to be dead and saved by Nobunaga and Machi, who defeated him, attacks Gon and the others. It is then revealed that Uvogin was revived as a puppet by Omokage, a former member of the Phantom Troupe who was defeated and replaced by Hisoka. The next day, Retsu leads Gon and Killua to the mansion from Kurapika's vision, and after leaving her behind for her safety, they meet another puppet, now based on Illumi, who attacks them. Gon's eyes are stolen. Omokage sends the Pairo and Illumi dolls to attack the Hunters, but Gon and Kurapika defeat them with Leorio and Killua's help, and retrieve their eyes.

In Hunter × Hunter: The Last Mission, Gon and Killua take a break from their expeditions with Kite to visit Heaven's Arena, and cheer for their friend Zushi in the Battle Olympia Tournament with Wing and Biscuit. Gon and Killua visit Netero, who is also at the building, but mysterious men take over the arena. Gon and his allies protect the arena, and people are trapped.

Gon has also appeared in several video games based on the anime. He is also playable in the crossover games Jump Ultimate Stars and Jump Force.

== Reception ==
Gon Freecss appeared third in the series' first two popularity polls. An IGN article listed Gon as one of the best anime characters of all time; comments focused on how the father's absence affects the character. In an Anitrendz poll, Gon was voted one of the best male characters from the 2010s. At the 7th Crunchyroll Anime Awards, Amal Hawija won Best Voice Artist Performance (Arabic) for her performance as Gon. The character's image was used in merchandising, most notably at a café called Animate Café in 2023. His adult appearance when confronting the enemy Neferpitou was subject to ridicule due to its exaggerated design, most notably his hair growing to an absurd height, with it was used for merchandising.

Gon initially garnered a negative reception because he appeared to be a generic protagonist comparable to Goku, Naruto Uzumaki, and other similar characters. Charles Solomon, a writer for The New York Times and Los Angeles Times, praised Gon's moral compass, a quality that gives the protagonist "an appeal his relentlessly upbeat counterparts lack". DVD Talk said Gon is one-dimensional when compared to the other protagonists because he does not have deep motivation to become a Hunter. On the other hand, there were positive comments about Gon's friendship with Killua by The Fandom Post. The Fandom Post said Gon but finds this difficult due to Gon's martyre-like behavior when his mentor is introduced. Derrick L. Tucker of THEM Anime Reviews praised the writing of Gon due to his offbeat personality, which contrasts with Killua's dark side and his drive to improve himself rather than become the strongest character, which sets him apart from other main characters of the series. Digital Fox Media noted his bond with Killua is engaging. The Madhouse adaptation of the series received praise for Erica Mendez's portrayal of Gon. Among other connections, Carl Kimlinger from Anime News Network found the relationship between Gon and his nemesis Hisoka strange due to the latter's interest in Gon and his growth. Kimlinger also praised the voice acting of Elinor Holt in the English dub.

Several writers were divided when Gon's character darkens when fighting Chimeras in order to save Kite. During this story arc of the series, Gon was criticized for offending Killua's feelings in his emotional outbursts. Polygon said the training the characters are into continuously tests Gon's and Killua's relationship as the former becomes selfish in his quest to save Kite until it is made impossible for the duo to be together. In Anime News Network's article "Hunter x Hunter & Dragon Ball Z: the Fall of the Shounen Hero," Gon was compared with Goku. Anime News Network noted Goku feels like he has something "prototypical not-Snyder Superman doesn't" through his self-centered obsession with fighting and getting stronger. The drawbacks of Goku's obsession are briefly explored in Dragon Ball, but while sharing many similarities with Goku, Gon appears as a much darker character. Anime News Network also found Gon's characterization darkens after his mentor Kite is killed. Gon's actions and demands shown in the latter chapters make the protagonist seem more like a villain. Comic Book Resources shared several comments about Gon's traits, such as his ruthless revenge against Neferpitou, ruining his likeable traits. Despite the negative response to Gon's rude behavior, Polygon still regarded his forced transformation against Pitou as one of the most iconic forms ever seen in anime because someone innocent becomes ruthless and delivers a brutal defeat to Neferpitou.
