= Lannan =

Lannan is a surname. Notable people with the surname include:

- Jill Lannan, National Guard of the United States general
- John Lannan (born 1984), American baseball player
- Marcy Lannan, Canadian actress and voice actress
- Michael Lannan, American screenwriter and producer

== See also ==
- Lannan Eacott or LazarBeam (born 1994), Australian YouTuber
