= List of Hunter × Hunter characters =

The protagonists of Hunter × Hunter, from left to right: Killua, Gon, Kurapika and Leorio

The Hunter × Hunter manga series, created by Yoshihiro Togashi, features an extensive cast of characters. It takes place in a fictional universe where licensed specialists known as Hunters travel the world taking on special jobs ranging from treasure hunting to assassination. The story initially focuses on Gon Freecss and his quest to become a Hunter in order to find his father, Ging, who is himself a famous Hunter. On the way, Gon meets and becomes close friends with Killua Zoldyck, Kurapika and Leorio Paradinight.

Although most characters are human, most possess superhuman strength or supernatural abilities due to Nen, the ability to control one's own life energy or aura. The world of the series also includes fantastical beasts such as the Chimera Ants and the Five great calamities.

== Main characters ==
=== Gon Freecss ===
Voiced by: Rica Matsumoto (1998 film), Junko Takeuchi (1999 series), Megumi Han (2011 series) (Japanese); Elinor Holt (1999 series), Erica Mendez (2011 series) (English)

Gon Freecss (Japanese: ゴン=フリークス, Hepburn: Gon Furīkusu) is an athletic, naive, and friendly boy. Having spent a lot of time in the woods as a child, he gets along very well with animals and has superhuman senses such as heightened sense of smell and sight, as well as very keen taste. Raised by Mito, Gon wants to become a Hunter in order to find his father, Ging, who is a Hunter as well. During the Hunter Exam Gon befriends Killua Zoldyck, Kurapika and Leorio Paradinight. After successfully becoming a licensed Hunter, Gon and Killua learn about Nen from Wing and later train further under Biscuit Krueger.^{[ch. 47, 48, 137]} After becoming one of the first people to beat Greed Island, and helping to stop the Chimera Ants, Gon meets his father.^{[ch. 335]}. Following the meeting with his father, Gon decides to return to Whale Island and reunites with Mito ^{[ch. 345]}. Gon is a popular character with fans, coming in third place in the series' first two popularity polls.

=== Killua Zoldyck ===
Voiced by: Kanako Mitsuhashi (1999 series), Mariya Ise (2011 series) (Japanese); Annika Odegard (1999 series), Cristina Vee (2011 series) (English)

Killua Zoldyck (キルア=ゾルディック, Kirua Zorudikku) is initially introduced as a cheeky, cheerful and mischievous boy who befriends Gon during the Hunter Exam. His ruthlessness and aptitude in killing show the other side of him — deadly, violent, and bloodthirsty. A member of the famous Zoldyck Family of assassins, Killua has been trained to be an assassin since birth and conditioned to possess extreme tolerance for poison, electricity and overall pain. Although Killua fails during his first Hunter Exam by killing an opponent due to his elder brother Illumi's influence, he attends the exam again the following year, earning his license by eliminating all other applicants in the very first trial.^{[ch. 36, 37, 148]} Killua and Gon learn about Nen from Wing and later train further under Biscuit Krueger.^{[ch. 47, 48, 137]} He becomes one of the first people to beat Greed Island, helps stop the Chimera Ants, and uses his sibling Alluka's special abilities to heal the dying Gon. As Gon is about to meet Ging, Killua decides to part ways and travel the world with Alluka ^{[ch. 338]}.

Conflicting with Killua's predisposition to kill is his unyielding loyalty to his new friends, as Killua puts them before himself without a single complaint. His greatest flaw is initially his fear of those seemingly more powerful than him,^{[ch. 210]} a result of Illumi's instructions to be extremely cautious and only engage in combat if victory is absolutely certain. Showing great promise from birth, he possesses extraordinary agility and strength as a one-man killing machine. Killua has mastered many killing techniques at a tender age and is set to be one of the best assassins his family has ever produced. His Nen type is Transmutation, which he utilizes by altering his aura into electricity. ^{[ch. 60, 122]} His Hatsu involves various uses of electricity to increase his physical capabilities, such as Godspeed (神速, Kanmuru), which allows him to move at immeasurable speeds.^{[ch. 281]} Killua is a popular character with fans, coming in first place in the series' first two popularity polls.

=== Kurapika ===
Voiced by: Noriko Hidaka (1998 film), Yuki Kaida (1999 series), Miyuki Sawashiro (2011 series) (Japanese); Cheryl McMaster (1999 series), Erika Harlacher (2011 series) (English)

Kurapika (クラピカ) is the sole survivor of the Kurta Clan (クルタ族, Kuruta-zoku), a race with treasured irises that turn scarlet in times of anger or emotional turmoil.^{[ch. 7]} Four years before the series, the entire Kurta clan was murdered by a criminal group known as the Phantom Troupe^{[ch. 2]}, who desecrated the Kurta's bodies by stealing their scarlet eyes, thereafter selling them on the black market. He participates in the Hunter Exam alongside Gon, Leorio and Killua in order to become a Blacklist Hunter and gain the resources to take vengeance for his people and retrieve their eyes.^{[ch. 2, 7]} Despite his morals, Kurapika is not above adjoining himself to society's underworld — he aligns himself with the Nostrade mafia family as soon as the opportunity presents itself, and soon becomes head of Nostrade's bodyguards.^{[ch. 79]} Normally intelligent, quick-thinking and levelheaded, upon sight of a spider, the symbol of the Phantom Troupe, he becomes enraged.^{[ch. 18]} He kills Uvogin, causes Pakunoda's death, and seals Chrollo Lucilfer's Nen. He is later invited to join the Zodiacs as the "Rat" at Leorio's recommendation, and only accepts upon being told that Tserriednich Hui Guo Rou has the last batch of eyes that he needs to retrieve.^{[ch. 344, 345]} This leads to his accompanying Woble Hui Guo Rou to the Dark Continent as her bodyguard.

Kurapika's Nen type is Conjuration. However, when his eyes turn scarlet, he becomes a Specialist.^{[ch. 83]} He conjures a unique weapon — five chains, extending from each finger on his right hand. His ring finger, Dowsing Chain: The Guiding Ring Finger (導く薬指の鎖(ダウジングチェーン), Daujingu Chēn: Michibiki no kusuriyubi), has a ball on the end used for dowsing and normal defensive and offensive purposes.^{[ch. 68]} Kurapika entered into a Nen contract for the chain on his middle finger, Chain Jail: The Restraining Middle Finger (束縛する中指の鎖(チェーンジェイル), Chēn Jeiru: Kōsoku suru nakayubi); in order to have an unbreakable chain that will fully incapacitate members of the Phantom Troupe, he offered his life should he use it on anyone other than its members.^{[ch. 83]} His thumb chain, Holy Chain: Healing Thumb (癒す親指の鎖(ホーリーチェーン), Hōrī Chēn: Iyashino oyayubi), heals any injury with the crucifix on the end.^{[ch. 84]} His little finger, Judgement Chain: Arbiter Little Finger (律する小指の鎖(ジャッジメントチェーン), Jajjimento Chēn: Saitei-sha ritorufingā), stabs an enemy's heart, allowing Kurapika to issue a command, which kills the enemy if not followed.^{[ch. 84]} His index finger, Thieving Index Finger: Steal Chain (奪う人差し指の鎖(スチールチェーン), Dorobō no hitosashiyubi: Suchīru Chēn), uses the syringe on the end to extract someone's aura and Nen ability.^{[ch. 361]} His specialist ability, Emperor Time: Absolute Mastery (絶対時間(エンペラータイム), Enperā Taimu: Zettai-tekina masutarī), allows him to utilize 100% of all types of Nen but shortens his lifespan by one hour every second he uses it.^{[ch. 83, 364]} When he uses his index finger with Emperor Time activated, it turns into Stealth Dolphin: Index Finger in Emperor Time (人差し指の絶対時間(ステルスドルフィン), Suterusu Dorufin: Enperātaimu no hitosashiyubi), a dolphin-like figure only he can see that allows him to use the stolen ability, informing him on its basic details^{[ch. 361]}, and grant the stolen ability to someone else (who then sees Stealth Dolphin as well) for a single use.^{[ch. 364]} Kurapika was inspired by the Ohmu in Hayao Miyazaki's Nausicaä of the Valley of the Wind. Kurapika is a popular character with fans, coming in second place in the series' first two popularity polls.

=== Leorio Paradinight ===
Voiced by: Nobutoshi Canna (1998 film), Hozumi Gōda (1999 series), Keiji Fujiwara (2011 series) (Japanese); Jonathan Love (1999 series), Matthew Mercer (2011 series) (English)

Leorio Paradinight (レオリオ=パラディナイト, Reorio Paradinaito) is an older-looking young man that befriends Gon, Kurapika and Killua during the Hunter Exam. After losing a friend to a curable illness he could not afford the treatment for, Leorio decides to become a Hunter, seeking the large financial gains of the profession to become a doctor and treat the impoverished for free.^{[ch. 7]} Though he is often outshone by the genius combat abilities of Gon and Killua, Leorio is rather talented. After becoming a licensed Hunter, Leorio assists his friends in their encounter with the Phantom Troupe from the sidelines. He resurfaces while Gon is hospitalized and enters the running to become the next Chairman of the Hunter Association, finishing in second place.^{[ch. 335]} Leorio is later invited to become a member of the Zodiacs as the "Boar" and joins their expedition to the Dark Continent.^{[ch. 343]} When the Black Whale finally sets sail, Leorio starts working at the medical facility on the third deck under Cheadle Yorkshire. Killua suspects that Leorio's Nen type is Emission after seeing him teleport a punch across a room with a wormhole.^{[ch. 325, 326]} Leorio is a popular character with fans, coming in fifth and sixth place in the series' first two popularity polls.

== Villains ==
=== Hisoka Morrow ===
Voiced by: Hiroki Takahashi (1999 series), Daisuke Namikawa (2011 series) (Japanese); Brendan Hunter (1999 series), Keith Silverstein (2011 series) (English)

Hisoka Morrow (ヒソカ=モロウ, Hisoka Morō) is a mysterious magician that magic tricks with violence and delights in battling those he considers strong to the point of sexual arousal.^{[ch. 5, 61]} He is deceitful, playful, and narcissistic by nature, acting only in his own self-interest. In the manga, his sentences typically end with a suit symbol. Hisoka takes an interest in Gon and his friends after encountering them during the Hunter Exam, letting them live so that they grow into more worthy opponents.^{[ch. 28]} Although he is initially positioned as an antagonist due to his affinity towards murder, he occasionally acts as a comrade to Gon, when it suits his own interests. Hisoka is revealed to be member number four of the Phantom Troupe, although he only joined for a chance to fight their leader, Chrollo Lucilfer.^{[ch. 78]} He leaves the group when Chrollo's Nen is sealed by Kurapika and sets out to find a way to break the seal.^{[ch. 119]} Having succeeding in this task, Hisoka dies after fighting Chrollo in Heavens Arena, but revives himself, and goes on a killing rampage against the Phantom Troupe.^{[ch. 357]} Hisoka is currently believed to be on board the Black Whale, where he is being hunted by the Phantom Troupe and the Xi-Yu and Cha-R mafia families.^{[ch. 378]}

Hisoka's Nen type is Transmutation, allowing him to change the type or properties of his aura. He most often uses Elastic Love - Bungee Gum (伸縮自在の愛(バンジーガム), Danryoku no aru ai: Banjī Gamu), which gives his aura the properties of both rubber and gum.^{[ch. 55]} He also uses Flimsy Lies - Texture Surprise (薄っぺらな嘘(ドッキリテクスチャー), Usupperana uso: Tekusucha Sapuraizu), which allows him to reproduce the texture of his choice on any flat surface; such as making a handkerchief appear to be skin.^{[ch. 55]} Hisoka is a popular character with fans, coming in fourth and fifth place in the series' first two popularity polls.

=== Illumi Zoldyck ===
Voiced by: Urara Takano (1999 series), Masaya Matsukaze (2011 series) (Japanese); Victor Atelevich (1999 series), Chris Hackney (2011 series) (English)

Illumi Zoldyck (イルミ=ゾルディック, Irumi Zorudikku) is Killua's eldest brother, an experienced and expert assassin who played a part in Killua's training and upbringing. He and his father raised Killua to thrive on killing and to be incapable of friendship,^{[ch. 36]} although Illumi planted a needle in Killua's brain to compel him to flee from unwinnable fights as his way of protecting him.^{[ch. 218]} During the 287th Hunter Exam, using special pins to change his facial structure, disguising himself as Gittarackur (ギタラクル, Gitarakuru),^{[ch. 35]} Illumi became a licensed Hunter and possibly manipulated Killua into disqualifying himself.^{[ch. 37]} After learning of and removing Illumi's needle from his brain, Killua later acts against his brother when he attempts to kill their sibling Alluka for the good of their family. Illumi also has a complex friendship with Hisoka, being hired by him to join the Phantom Troupe as their number 11 and kill him.^{[ch. 377]} Illumi is a Manipulation-type Nen user and his Nen ability allows him to use his needles to manipulate corpses or alter his body form. His other Nen ability is called Needle People (針人間, Nīdorupīpuru/Hariningen) giving him the ability to manipulate people with his needles.

Illumi came in sixth and eighth place in the series' first two popularity polls.

=== Phantom Troupe ===
The Phantom Troupe (幻影旅団, Gen'ei Ryodan), also known as the Spiders (旅団(クモ), Kumo), is a gang of thieves with a 13 membership ever-changing roster. New entrants to the organization are chosen by their leader Chrollo, and those who kill a member may take their place. Each member bears a numbered tattoo of a 12-legged spider.^{[ch. 18]} Chrollo and most of the members of the Phantom Troupe originated in the slum Meteor City (流星街, Ryūseigai), the residents of which do not exist in any official records, an ideal recruiting ground for criminal organizations. The group originated as a collection of children performing live voiceover dubs for foreign-language television shows, turning to villainy after one of their proto-members was abducted and murdered.^{[ch. 395]}^{[ch. 397]} The Spiders are responsible for multiple crimes, such as the extermination of the Kurta Clan,^{[ch. 104]} the stealing of the Yorknew auction,^{[ch. 73]} as well as their subsequent Mafia massacre,^{[ch. 97]} which completely changed the underground world.^{[ch. 377]} Although they mainly steal and kill, they occasionally do philanthropic work,^{[ch. 78]} although only for Meteor City.^{[ch. 224]} Currently, after he murdered two of their members following his defeat by Chrollo, the Phantom Troupe are on board the Black Whale hunting down Hisoka for revenge.^{[ch. 377]}

==== Chrollo Lucilfer ====
Voiced by: Yoshikazu Nagano (1999 series), Mamoru Miyano (2011 series), (Japanese); Richard Meen (1999 series), Robbie Daymond (2011 series) (English)

Chrollo Lucilfer (クロロ ルシルフル, Kuroro Rushirufuru) is the founder and leader of the Phantom Troupe, bearing the number 0, and is considered by its members as irreplaceable despite putting the Troupe before himself. Surprisingly, Chrollo is right in the middle in terms of the Troupe's physical strength, at seventh place. Chrollo led the genocide of the Kurta Clan, which resulted in its sole survivor Kurapika vowing to punish all of the Spiders. After meeting in Yorknew City, Chrollo is afflicted by Kurapika's ability which forbids the use of his own Nen as well as any contact with his subordinates.^{[ch. 117]} Some time later, Hisoka acquires an exorcist to remove Kurapika's seal in order to finally challenge Chrollo to a fight. Chrollo wins the match and seemingly kills him. After Hisoka reveals himself to still be alive and begins killing off members of the Troupe, he and the rest of the Spiders board the Black Whale.^{[ch. 366]} His Nen type is Specialization and his ability Skill Hunter: Bandit's Secret (盗賊の極意(スキルハンター), Sukiruhantā: Tōzoku no himitsu) allows him to directly steal and use the abilities of other Nen users, which he stores in a Conjured book.^{[ch. 98]} Chrollo came in fourth place in the series' second popularity poll.

==== Nobunaga Hazama ====
Voiced by: Takashi Matsuyama (1999 series), Naoya Uchida (2011 series) (Japanese); John Knight (1999 series), Joe J. Thomas (2011 series) (English)

Nobunaga Hazama (ノブナガ ハザマ) is one of the original members hailing from Meteor City and bears the number 1 in the Troupe. He has a similar appearance to ronin warriors in Edo period Japan, complete with a long katana that he uses with great finesse and skill. Nobunaga specializes in combining nen with the use of his katana. His best friend is Uvogin, and the two bring out the best of each other in combat. Seeing some of Uvogin's personality in Gon, he expresses interest in having Gon join the Troupe, though Gon adamantly refuses. Nobunaga ranks ninth in physical power among the Troupe, and is one of the original members. Nobunaga is on the Black Whale with the rest of the Troupe, hunting for treasure and Hisoka. He, along with Feitan, Phinks, and Franklin, thrash three unruly passengers to gain seating in the cafeteria. Once the thugs submit to them, he asks them how they can get to the second floor. His Nen type is Enhancement. Nobunaga came in 14th place in the series' second popularity poll.

==== Feitan Portor ====
Voiced by: Akari Hibino (1999 series), Kappei Yamaguchi (2011 series) (Japanese); Meredith Taylor Parry (1999 series), Tom Bauer (2011 series) (English)

Feitan Portor (フェイタン ポートオ, Feitan Pōtoo) is one of the original members hailing from Meteor City and bears the number 2 in the Troupe. He's physically the fifth strongest member in Troupe. He is attired in what one would expect from a bandit—dark clothes partnered with a skullhead scarf that covers his mouth. He seldom speaks, but when he does, it is full of grammatical errors, giving the impression that he is not speaking in his native tongue. During the Phantom Troupe's fight with Chimera Ants, Feitan reverts to his native language, shown with Chinese characters. After Feitan's victory over Zazan in Meteor City, he is crowned temporary leader of the Phantom Troupe. Feitan's movements are incredibly fast, being able to leave afterimages of his body. He wields an umbrella that conceals both a sword and a gun. He later appears on the Black Whale with Phinks, Franklin, and Nobunaga.

His Nen type is Transmutation. His ability Unforgiven: Pain Packer (許されざる者(ペインパッカー), Yurusarezarumono: Pein Pakkā) transforms the injuries he has received from his enemy into an attack. The more pain he receives, the stronger his attack. Currently, only Burnt by the Sun: Rising Sun (太陽に灼かれて(ライジングサン), Taiyō ni yaka rete: Raijingu San) has been revealed, a miniature sun that burns anyone around him, even allies, as shown by the rest of the Phantom Troupe fleeing the scene when he uses it. Only Feitan is unaffected by the attack, presumably because of the armor that is formed on him.^{[ch. 229]} Feitan came in tenth place in the series' second popularity poll.

==== Machi Komacine ====
Voiced by: Noriko Namiki (1999 series), Takako Uemura (OVA), Rena Maeda (2011 series) (Japanese); Marcy Lannan (1999 series), Abby Trott (2011 series) (English)

Machi Komacine (マチ コマチネ) is incredibly loyal to Chrollo and is one of the original members from Meteor City, bearing the number 3. Physically, she is the strongest woman in the Troupe and the sixth strongest overall. Hisoka seems to have an occasional interest in her. She has an extremely keen intuition (the other members claim that she has never been wrong). Machi's Nen type is Transmutation. Her ability Nen Stitches (念糸縫合, Nensi Hougou) forms her aura into thread, the strength of which is inversely proportional to its length: a thread as long as the diameter of the Earth would be as strong as cotton, but a one millimeter-long thread can lift a ton. It can be used to track people, and also to stitch severed limbs back on.^{[ch. 55]} Machi came in seventh place in the series' second popularity poll.

==== Phinks Magcub ====
Voiced by: Yoshiaki Matsumoto (1999 series), Kenn (2011 series) (Japanese); Lucas Gilbertson (1999 series), David Vincent (2011 series) (English)

Phinks Magcub (フィンクス マグカブ, Finkusu Magukabu) uses his hands in battle, which has been shown to be extremely powerful. He is one of the original Phantom Troupe members from Meteor City, wears a Pharaoh-like outfit in battle and bears the number 5. Phinks seems to get along best with Feitan, and is almost always seen partnered with him both in and out of combat. As with the rest of the Phantom Troupe, Phinks boards the Black Whale. Phinks, along with Feitan, Franklin, and Nobunaga, confront and thrash three unruly passengers. His Nen ability is called Kaiten - Ripper Cyclotron (廻天(リッパー・サイクロトロン), Kaiten: Rippā Saikurotoron), the strength of which is dependent upon how many times he rotates his arm; the more rotations, the more powerful his attack will be. In terms of physical strength, Phinks is ranked second among the Troupe members. Nen type: Enhancement.

==== Shalnark Ryusei ====
Voiced by: Yasuhiro Takato (1999 series), Noriko Hidaka (2011 series) (Japanese); Jordan Schartner (1999 series), Griffin Burns (2011 series) (English)

Shalnark (シャルナーク, Sharunāku) is one of the original Phantom Troupe members from Meteor City and bears the number 6, and from his appearance, seems to be a normal man. However, he is one of the most intelligent and quick-thinking members in the group, being highly adept at using computers and information gathering. Shalnark is also a licensed Hunter, so he has access to potentially useful information for the Phantom Troupe. He ranks tenth in physical power. Shalnark is the second member killed by Hisoka after he decides to wipe out the Phantom Troupe following his defeat by Chrollo.^{[ch. 357]} Shalnark's Nen type is Manipulation.

His main ability, Black Voice: Mobile Fate Director (携帯する他人の運命(ブラック ボイス)), allows him to completely control the actions of others remotely using his cell phone after sticking a specialized antenna into their bodies. His secondary ability involves applying the antenna upon himself and putting his body on autopilot, resulting in an enhanced state with enough power to devastate most opponents. However, he dislikes this ability because he is subject to immense muscle pain for days after its use, and, as he retains no memory or control over what transpires, he can not derive any pleasure or satisfaction when he uses it to win a fight.^{[ch. 227]} Shalnark came in 17th place in the series' second popularity poll.

==== Franklin Bordeau ====
Voiced by: Yoshinobu Kaneko (1999 series Japanese), Kenji Nomura (G.I. OVA Series), Hidenobu Kiuchi (2011 series), (Japanese); Steve Olson (1999 series), Edward Bosco (2011 series) (English)

Franklin Bordeau (フランクリン ボルドー, Furankurin Borudō) is a very large Frankenstein-like man that bears the number 7. He ranks fourth in physical power among the Troupe and is among the original members hailing from Meteor City. Franklin, along with the rest of the Phantom Troupe, is aboard the Black Whale. Franklin's Nen type is Emission. His ability is called Dual Machine Gun (俺の両手は機関銃(ダブルマシンガン), Daburu Mashingan) and allows him to shoot countless bullets composed of Nen from his fingertips, which he modified into guns himself.

==== Shizuku Murasaki ====
Voiced by: Atsuko Bungo (1999 series), Miho Arakawa (2011 series) (Japanese); Emily Bachynski (1999 series), Janice Roman Roku (2011 series) (English)

Shizuku Murasaki (シズク ムラサキ) is extremely forgetful, even an airhead at times, which, along with her quiet appearance, causes opponents to underestimate her abilities.^{[ch. 91]} She is left-handed,^{[ch. 72]} and the 12th strongest physically of the Troupe's 13 members. Shizuku is number 8, a replacement for a previous member, and she also originates from Meteor City.^{[ch. 102]} Shizuku's Nen type is Conjuration. She conjures the Nen vacuum Blinky (デメちゃん, Demechan), which can aspirate anything that she considers nonliving that isn't Nen-made, and regurgitate the last thing inhaled. Shizuku came in 11th place in the series' second popularity poll.

==== Pakunoda ====
Voiced by: Yoshiko Iseki (1999 series), Romi Park (2011 series) (Japanese); Tracy Sutton (1999 series), Erica Lindbeck (2011 series) (English)

Pakunoda (パクノダ) is an original member of the Phantom Troupe from Meteor City and bears the number 9. She is fully loyal to Chrollo, even going against the Troupe in order to help him. She is killed by Kurapika's Judgement Chain in the climax of the Phantom Troupe arc by purposefully violating the restrictions placed upon her. Her body is buried in the Troupe's Yorknew hideout. Pakunoda's Nen type is Specialization. Her main ability is to read the memories of people she touches by asking specific questions, a form of Psychometry.^{[ch. 103]} Her secondary ability, Memory Bomb (記憶弾(メモリーボム), Memorī Bomu), allows her to conjure these memories into the shape of a bullet which she fires into people's heads, thereby giving them that information. She is 11th in physical strength.

==== Bonolenov Ndongo ====
Voiced by: Chō (Japanese); Doug Erholtz (English)

Bonolenov Ndongo (ボノレノフ ンドンゴ, Bonorenofu Ndongo) is covered in bandages and wears boxing gloves, and bears the number 10 in the Troupe. These bandages cover up a large number of holes throughout his body. During the Chimera Ant arc, he fights with the other members of the Phantom Troupe against the Chimera Ants. His physical power ranks eighth among the Troupe. Bonolenov is a descendant of the Gyudondond (ギュドンドンド), a small wild tribe that was chased out of their lands by development. When males of the Gyudondond tribe reach the age of three, they are circumcised and needles are inserted in various parts of their body. Over time, these needles are replaced with thicker sticks, and the holes are stabilized with bamboo stalks or stones. Using these holes, Gyudondond males are able to create a variety of sounds through air flow. They are called "Bap" (バプ, Bapu), the dancing warriors, and fulfill the role of shamans and performers in their tribe. Before combat, they use their bodies to play songs of battle. The Gyudondond believe that the more beautiful a sound that is played, the greater the spirit it can summon. Bonolenov uses the various songs he makes as a medium to materialize different effects (from an armor and spear to a scaled-down planet Jupiter) through his Conjuration Nen ability, titled War Anthem - Battle Cantabile (戦闘演武曲(バトレカンタービレ), Sensōsanka - Batorukantābire). ^{[ch. 225]}

==== Uvogin ====
Voiced by: Eiji Takemoto (1999 series), Akio Otsuka (2011 series) (Japanese); Mike Shepherd (1999 series), Patrick Seitz (2011 series) (English)

Uvogin (ウヴォーギン, Uvōgin) is one of the original members of the Troupe from Meteor City and bears the number 11 in the Troupe. Out of all, he is the strongest in terms of raw physical power. Direct hits from bullets, sniper rounds, and even anti-tank rockets do not cause visible damage to him.^{[ch. 75]} Like all of the Troupe, he never hesitates to kill, and particularly enjoys combat against skilled opponents. Although he prefers to fight alone, Uvogin is stronger when fighting with a partner, usually Nobunaga, as he fights better when there is someone else to protect (although he never admits this).^{[ch. 93]} Seeking revenge on Kurapika for capturing him after his battle with the Shadow Beasts, Uvogin tracks him to the hotel where Neon Nostrade and the rest of her bodyguards are staying. They fight one-on-one in a small canyon on the outskirts of Yorknew City. Kurapika eventually captures Uvogin with his Chain Jail, and questions him about the location and abilities of the other Phantom Troupe members. Uvogin refuses to answer any questions. Kurapika pierces Uvogin's chest with his Judgement Chain ability, giving the condition to answer all questions truthfully, in a last-ditch attempt to threaten him. Uvogin refuses for the final time, and is instantly killed, with his body buried by Kurapika soon after.^{[ch. 84]} His Nen type is Enhancement. His Nen ability is Fist of Destruction: Big Bang Impact (超破壊拳(ビッグバンインパクト), Hakai no ken: Bigguban'inpakuto) which allows him to focus his aura into his fist, causing a massive explosion upon impact. Uvogin came in 12th place in the series' second popularity poll.

==== Kortopi ====
Voiced by: Umi Tenjin (1999 series), Shinya Hamazoe (2011 series) (Japanese); Tony Oliver (2011 series) (English)

Kortopi (コルトピ, Korutopi) is short in stature with a thick and messy mane of hair covering his entire head, obscuring everything except for an occasional glimpse of his left eyeball, and bears the number 12, also originating from Meteor City.^{[ch. 128]} He is the weakest in the Troupe in raw physical power. In fact, his Conjuration Nen abilities suggest that he is not involved in combat, but rather theft and subterfuge, although he was nevertheless a ruthless killer like the rest of them. His Nen ability is called Gallery Fake: Divine Left Hand, Demonic Right Hand (神の左手, 悪魔の右手(ギャラリーフェイク), Gyararī Feiku: Kami no hidarite, Akuma no migite), which allows him to make perfect copies of any object by touching it with his left hand and producing the copy with his right. He can make copies of living humans, but they will be immobile and lifeless. The copies vanish after 24 hours have passed. He is also able to know the exact location of any copy he has created by touching the original object.^{[ch. 109]} Kortopi is the first of the Phantom Troupe members killed by Hisoka after his defeat to Chrollo.^{[ch. 357]}

==== Kalluto Zoldyck ====
Voiced by: Yūko Maekawa (1999 series), Mamiko Noto (2011 series) (Japanese); Lauren Landa (2011 series) (English)

Kalluto Zoldyck (カルト ゾルディック, Karuto Zorudikku) is the youngest member of the Zoldyck Family, androgynous in appearance and wearing a feminine kimono. He is initially introduced accompanying his mother during Gon's retrieval of Killua, and later helps his family in the assassination of the Ten Mafia Dons who placed bounties on the Phantom Troupe.^{[ch. 41, 100]} Kalluto joins the Troupe as Hisoka's replacement, bearing the number 4, during their entrance into Greed Island.^{[ch. 170]} During the Phantom Troupe's assault on Zazan's palace in Meteor City, Kalluto reveals he joined them with the intention of retrieving his brother Killua^{[ch. 229]} His Nen ability, Snake Dance (蛇咬の舞, Dakounomai), uses a hand fan to control paper confetti that is sharp enough to cut metal.^{[ch. 226]} Kalluto came in 14th place in the series' first popularity poll.

=== Genthru ===
Voiced by: Tsuyoshi Koyama (OVA), Hiroyuki Yoshino (2011 series) (Japanese); Todd Haberkorn (2011 series) (English)

Genthru (ゲンスルー, Gensurū) is a player of Greed Island and a member of a large group of other allied players in the game.^{[ch. 143]} A founding member of the group, he has worked as an informer recruiting new members for the last five years.^{[ch. 142]} His secret identity is that of the Greed Island Bomber (爆弾魔({{{2}}}), Bakudannma), working with his partners Sub (サブ, Sabu) and Bara (バラ).^{[ch. 144]} He reveals that he placed a Nen time bomb on every member of the allied group using his ability Countdown: Sound of Life (命の音(カウントダウン), Kauntodaun: Saundo Obu Raifu), so that he can blackmail them for all the specified slot cards they hold.^{[ch. 142, 143]} However, Genthru does not keep his promise and detonates all the Nen time bombs killing all the members of the allied group except Abengane.^{[ch. 144]} He then rejoins Sub and Bara to continue collecting the rest of the specified slot cards in order to win the game. However, he is challenged and defeated by Gon in a one-on-one match (while Killua and Biscuit draw away his teammates and defeat them separately).^{[ch. 183]} Genthru is also able to create detonations in his hands when he grabs something using Little Flower: A Handful of Gunpowder (一握りの火薬(リトルフラワー), Chīsana Hana: Hitonigiri no kayaku).^{[ch. 142, 143]}

=== Chimera Ants ===
Chimera Ants (キメラ=アント, Kimera Anto) are an invasive species of insect that originate from the Dark Continent, extremely dangerous and ranked as quarantined due to their voracious appetites.^{[ch. 187]} Chimera Ant queens possess an entirely unique method of reproduction known as Phagogenesis (食作用, Shoku Sayō): reproducing asexually while imbuing her offspring with the genetic traits of whatever she ate.^{[ch. 187]} To take advantage of the genes of a particular species, a Chimera Ant queen has been known to feed until the fodder species is driven to extinction. One mutated Chimera Ant Queen in particular targets humans, leading to the creation of humanoid Chimera Ants who desire individualism and develop the ability to use Nen.^{[ch. 188]} These human Chimera Ants also possess the genetic memories of their "past lives", some only having trace memories while others are their original selves reborn.^{[ch. 215]} Following the death of the Queen, the colony disburses with a majority following the King Meruem while others attempt to create their own colonies.^{[ch. 214]} Only a few of the humanoid Chimera Ants survive and are allowed to live among humans, classified as a new species of magical beast.^{[ch. 315]}

==== Chimera Ant Queen ====
Voiced by: Masako Ikeda (Japanese); Cindy Robinson (English)

The Chimera Ant Queen (キメラアントの女王, Kimerānto no Joō) is the first Chimera Ant to be seen in the series, having mysteriously mutated to about two meters tall instead of her kind's typical height of ten centimeters.^{[ch. 187]} She first appears having washed up injured on the shores of the autonomous region of Neo-Green Life (or simply NGL), a small insular nation located on an island known as the Mitene Union.^{[ch. 188]} Driven by her reproductive instincts to give birth to a Chimera Ant King with ideal traits, the Queen immediately begins to feed on small mammals and aquatic life in order to give birth to soldier ants to bring her larger prey in greater amounts. When one brings her two human children to feed on, she notes them to be more nourishing than her previous prey and becomes obsessed with human as nourishment, sending her soldiers to concentrate on gathering more humans to feed on.^{[ch. 187]} NGL's status as neo-Luddite enables the Queen's offspring to be unopposed before their activities are eventually learned by the outside world. The Queen is fatally injured when the Chimera Ant King forces his own premature birth, damaging her organs with massive blood loss.^{[ch. 213]} Despite receiving treatment from Hunters, she dies while naming her son as Meruem. But upon her death, the Queen is revealed to have birthed a twin sister to Meruem, who is later revealed to be Kite reborn as a Chimera Ant.^{[ch. 215, 316]}

==== Meruem ====
Voiced by: Kōki Uchiyama (Japanese); Max Mittelman (English)

Meruem (メルエム, Meruemu; alternately "Meryem"^{[ch. 215]}) is the Chimera Ant King (キメラアントの王, Kimerānto no Ō) and the most powerful of the Queen's offspring. Forcing himself out the womb at the cost of the Queen's life, Meruem is arrogant with little sense of identity aside from his supposed destiny and preconceived notions of his kind's superiority over humans.^{[ch. 213]} Meruem leaves the N.G.L. with his Royal Guards in search of a place to establish his colony, taking over the Republic of East Gorteau. Pitou manipulates the corpse of East Gorteau's dictator Ming Jol-ik to order a mandatory gathering of the entire population for a national rally, so they can secretly sort to find Nen users who will be used as food.^{[ch. 223]} They also use Pitou's ability to manipulate the people, forming an army of soldiers under their control.^{[ch. 230]} The Hunter Association mobilizes an extermination team to infiltrate the East Gorteau palace and assassinate Meruem, composed of a selected team of professional Hunters.

Meruem takes an interest in strategy games, defeating champion-level players by learning their battle tactics after disrupting the flow of their playing style.^{[ch. 244]} However, he is unable to overcome the skill of a blind girl named Komugi in Gungi, the local game she reigns over. As Meruem finds himself unable to beat her, he begins showing respect and care for Komugi while questioning his own violent methods of ruling.^{[ch. 255, 258]} As such, the King wavers between his human emotions and animal instincts, ultimately deciding to compromise by taking over the planet for the Chimera Ants, but sparing humans and leaving them to live in reservations.^{[ch. 288, 297]} Meruem's faltering leaves him vulnerable, experiencing fear for the first time when Netero detonates the bomb in his body as a last resort.^{[ch. 298]} Near death, Meruem survives and regenerates by feeding on the cells of Pouf and Youpi, acquiring their abilities as well.^{[ch. 299, 312]} The King suffers temporary memory loss before recovering his memories of Komugi.^{[ch. 301]} But Netero's suicide attack ultimately takes Meruem's life due to the bomb's residual poison, spending his final moments playing with Komugi before dying in her arms.^{[ch. 318]} Meruem's Nen ability, Aura Synthesis (オーラ合成, Ōra Gōsei), allows him to take in the aura of other creatures he consume, making him stronger in the process.

==== Royal Guards ====
The Royal Guards are a trio of elite Chimera Ants whose objective is protecting Ants of the royal caste. They originally serve the Queen, who personally named them, until the King is born, after which they switch loyalties and follow him to the Republic of East Gorteau.^{[ch. 213]} The Royal Guards include Neferpitou, Shaiapouf, and Menthuthuyoupi.

==== Neferpitou ====
Voiced by: Ayumi Fujimura (Japanese); Sarah Anne Williams (English)

Neferpitou (ネフェルピトー, Neferupitō), also known as "Pitou" (ピトー, Pitō), is a kemonomimi-themed Chimera Ant and the firstborn of the Royal Guards. Pitou is one of the first Chimera Ants to fully utilize Nen with enough skill to be recognized by even Netero as a superior combatant.^{[ch. 201]} Pitou shows a knack for medical/surgical procedures, prodding and manipulating Pokkle's brain in order to have the human divulge everything he knows about Nen to the Ants.^{[ch. 198]} As a Specialist-type Nen user,^{[ch. 198]} Pitou's ability Toy Repair: Doctor Blythe (玩具修理者(ドクターブライス), Omocha no shūri: Dokutā Buraisu) heals injuries,^{[ch. 265]} while Puppet Master's Serenity: Terpsichora (黒子舞想(テレプシコーラ), Papettomasutā no Shizukesa: Terepushikōra) can manipulate bodies regardless if they are alive or dead.^{[ch. 304]}

After being born, Pitou engaged Kite when he, Gon, and Killua almost reached the nest. Pitou killed Kite after he had Killua and Gon escape, reanimating his corpse as a training dummy for the other chimera ants before the Hunters acquired it. Later confronted by Gon and deeming him a potential threat to Meruem, Pitou exploits the boy's hopes that Kite was still alive to get him away from Komugi to kill him without endangering the girl.^{[ch. 295]} But upon revealing Kite's fate, Pitou's head is completely destroyed when Gon forcibly aged himself at the cost of his ability to use Nen. But Pitou's corpse is briefly reanimated by a more potent Terpsichora for the purpose of killing Gon, severing the boy's arm before being damaged beyond repair.^{[vol. 29]}

==== Shaiapouf ====
Voiced by: Wataru Hatano (Japanese); Chris Niosi (English)

Shaiapouf (シャウアプフ, Shauapufu), also known as "Pouf" (プフ, Pufu), is a humanoid butterfly-themed Chimera Ant and one of the Royal Guards.^{[ch. 202]} He is the most cunning of the three, though his temperament and love for Meruem causes him to covertly defy the King's orders in order to prevent his humanization. Having wholeheartedly devoted himself to protect Meruem while seeing humans as inferior, Pouf is grossly disturbed by the King's obsession with Komugi whom he views as a threat to their plans to the point of making attempts on the girl's life.^{[ch. 301]} Pouf's Nen ability Bufferfly Scales Love Spring: Spiritual Message (麟粉乃愛泉(スピリチュアルメッセージ), Baffafurai no uroko wa haru o aisuru: Supirichuaru Messēji) spreads scales from his wings into the air allowing him to read opponents' psychological states.^{[ch. 273]} When inhaled the scales have a hypnotic effect on the human populace, keeping them in place to be sorted at the palace.^{[ch. 260]} His other ability Beelzebub, King of Flies (蠅の王(ベルゼブブ), Beruzebubu. Hae no Ō) allows Pouf to break up his body into clones of various sizes down to nanosize.^{[ch. 286]} Following the blast from Netero's bomb, Pouf runs to Meruem and allows him to feed on his own cells to save the King's life.^{[ch. 299]} Pouf dies from the poison he was exposed to at ground zero of the bomb.^{[ch. 314]}

==== Menthuthuyoupi ====
Voiced by: Fumihiko Tachiki (Japanese); Joshua Tomar (English)

Menthuthuyoupi (モントゥトゥユピー, Montutuyupī), also known as "Youpi" (ユピー, Yupī), is the third of the Chimera Ant Royal Guards. Youpi is the largest of the three and the only non-human hybrid among them, mixed with the genes of a magical beast instead.^{[ch. 266]} He is the most straightforward of the Royal Guards and possesses a strength that comes from complete selflessness and devotion to the King. Youpi's body can metamorphosize, such as forming wings to fly or additional arms for combat.^{[ch. 266]} After feeling extreme mental stress, he learns his Nen ability can billow large quantities of his aura into his body and release it in a destructive explosion.^{[ch. 278]} Through his fights with the Hunters, Youpi comes to respect them and Nen to the point of letting them live.^{[ch. 290]} Following the blast from Netero's bomb, Youpi runs to Meruem and allows him to feed on his own cells to save the King's life.^{[ch. 299]} Youpi dies from the poison he was exposed to at ground zero of the bomb.^{[ch. 312]}

=== Others ===
==== Leol ====
Voiced by: Jiro Saito (Japanese); Taylor Henry (English)

Leol (レオル, Reoru) is a Chimera Ant squadron leader resembling a lion with tiger-like stripes.^{[ch. 192]} Originally named Hagya (ハギャ), he was a lion in a past life.^{[ch. 197]} Leol is among the Chimera Ants who eat humans meant for the Queen, and later develops an interest in Nen users.^{[ch. 192]} After the Queen's death, he sets out to form his own colony, but flees from Hunters back to the King's side.^{[ch. 216, 234]} Leol's Nen ability is I.O.U. Dispenser: Rental Pod (ディスペンサー(レンタルポッド), Disupensā: Rentaru Poddo), an iPod-like device that stores Nen abilities he can borrow from people indebted to him for the duration of an hour.^{[ch. 248]} During Morel and Knov's primary infiltration of the King's palace in East Gorteau, Leol faces Morel in combat.^{[ch. 253]} He assumes to be victorious after submerging Morel in an underground church using a stolen ability, but dies from carbon dioxide asphyxiation as part of Morel's cunning strategy to remove all oxygen in the church.^{[ch. 254]}

==== Cheetu ====
Voiced by: Motoki Takagi (Japanese); Cedric L. Williams (English)

Cheetu (ヂートゥ, Jītu) is a cheetah-like Chimera Ant squadron leader with unparalleled speed, allowing him to dodge bullets with ease and rapidly punch experienced Hunters before they can even move. He is among the Chimera Ants who eat humans meant for the Queen.^{[ch. 192]} Compared to the other Chimera Ants, Cheetu is very simpleminded and egotistical with no agenda of his own while simply content with being the fastest. After the Queen's death, Cheetu leaves NGL and heads to the east before being impeded by Morel and Knuckle. Although he is tagged with Knuckle's A.P.R., Cheetu flees out of range, halting the interest-accruing.^{[ch. 221]} The ordeal convinces Cheetu that he needs something other than pure speed and has A.P.R. exorcized by Hirin before getting a new Nen ability.^{[ch. 245]} He confronts Morel again, with the new ability transporting them to a limited-sized area for a game of tag, but is defeated by being psychologically tricked.^{[ch. 247]} Cheetu quickly develops another new Nen ability on the spot, a combined crossbow and claws, but is again tricked before fleeing.^{[ch. 248]} He is later seen boasting about yet another new ability, but is crushed to death by Silva Zoldyck from above.^{[ch. 278]}

==== Yunju ====
Voiced by: Yuya Murakami (Japanese); Edward Bosco (English)

Yunju (ユンジュ) is a centaur-themed Chimera Ant squadron leader that leads two other soldiers known as Centipede (ムカデ, Mukade) and Mosquito (蚊, Ka). Yunju is a sadistic Chimera Ant who preys upon humans and even treating them as pet dogs.^{[ch. 192]} He was eventually killed by Kite while Gon and Killua defeated his two soldiers.^{[ch. 193]}

==== Zazan ====
Voiced by: Azusa Nakao (Japanese); Allegra Clark (English)

Zazan (ザザン) is a scorpion-themed Chimera Ant squadron leader that resembles an extremely buxom, attractive woman with a scorpion's stinger tail, whose murderous subordinates include her doting right hand Pike (パイク, Paiku).^{[ch. 190]} While gathering humans for the Queen, Zazan captures Pokkle and brings him to the colony.^{[ch. 190]} Following the Queen's death, Zazan leaves NGL to start her own colony in Meteor City and turns a large number of humans there into subservient minions with her Nen ability Sexy Stinger of Rebirth: Queen Shot (転生のセクシースティンガー(クィーンショット), Tensei no Sekushī Sutingā: Kuīn Shotto).^{[ch. 224]} When the Phantom Troupe attack her hive, Zazan is forced to discard her beauty for power as a last resort against Feitan by ripping off her tail to transform into a strong crocodilian monster with a super-hard hide. But she is ultimately incinerated by Feitan's Nen ability.^{[ch. 228, 229]}

==== Pike ====
Voiced by: Masahiro Yamanaka (Japanese); Paul St. Peter (English)

Pike (パイク, Paiku) is an elderly spider-themed Chimera Ant that works as an officer under Zazan's command .^{[ch. 190]} He is extremely loyal to Zazan, often wanting to be praised by the squadron leader although he is quite simple-minded and stubborn. During their raid on Meteor City, he was killed by Shizuku.^{[ch. 228]} Pike's Nen ability is Deluge D'Amour: Love Shower (デリュージ・ダムール(ラブシャワー), Deryūji damūru: Rabu Shawā) which allows him to shoot a durable, sticky web to ensnare his target and according to him, Bihorn (ビホーン, Bihōn), the physically strongest squadron leader can't break it.^{[ch. 227]}

==== Boki ====
Voiced by: Kōki Miyata (Japanese); Ted Sroka (English)

Boki (ボキ) is a soldier working for Zazan.^{[ch. 226]}. He is a beetle-themed Chimera Ant whose head vaguely resembles Ultraman. Boki uses his Nen ability to control another Chimera Ant named Pell (ペル, Peru). He was eventually killed by Shalnark during their invasion in Meteor City.^{[ch. 227]} Boki's Nen type is Manipulation and his ability allows him to control his target with a video game joystick.

==== Rammot ====
Voiced by: Shinya Hamazoe (Japanese); Tony Oliver (English)

Rammot (ラモット, Ramotto) is an officer under Colt's command, a humanoid Chimera Ant with the genetic traits of a rabbit and a shrike.^{[ch. 191]} Prone to acting on his own, Rammot attacks Gon and Killua to defend his food, and is losing before being saved by Colt while vowing brutal revenge on the two youths.^{[ch. 191]} But the boys' attack inadvertently activated Rammot's aura and made him the first Chimera Ant to utilize Nen, making him briefly arrogant until meeting Neferpitou with renewed loyalty to the colony as hits the other Ants to awaken their Nen.^{[vol. 9]} Rammot later decides to get his revenge after the Queen's death, targeting Killua first before being decapitated once the boy removes Illumi's needle from his brain.^{[ch. 219]}

Rammot's Nen type is Enhancement.^{[ch. 198]} His Nen ability allows him to turn his feathers into sharp feathers.^{[ch. 219]}

==== Ortho Siblings ====
Voiced by: Makiko Ohmoto and Masaki Aizawa (Japanese); Xanthe Huynh and Bea Billany (English)

The Ortho Siblings (オルソ兄弟, Oruso Kyōdai) are a pair of Chimera Ant siblings.^{[ch. 238]} Despite believing that they have killed Killua with their Nen ability and went to the unconscious body of the boy to confirm it, he immediately beheaded them. He reveals to the siblings that he is aware that the last dart is aimed at his head and uses his new Nen ability called Godspeed to avoid the last dart.^{[ch. 240]}

The two share the Nen ability Death Games: Dart De Darts (デスゲーム(ダート デ ダーツ), Desugēmu: Dāto De Dātsu) which works when the sister conjures a tag on someone, which cannot be removed until the game ends. The brother can then start the game by throwing darts, which will conjure a fish-like dart on the target's body. The game can take extreme risk if the brother fails to score the last hit, all the damage accumulated to their target will be redirected to themselves.^{[ch. 239]}

=== Pariston Hill ===
Voiced by: Hiroki Takahashi (Japanese); Kyle McCarley (English)

Pariston Hill (パリストン=ヒル, Parisuton Hiru) is a Triple Star Hunter and Vice Chairman of the Hunter Association.^{[ch. 326]} A member of the Zodiacs, his code name is the "Rat", and like Ging, he does not alter his physical appearance to match his animal.^{[ch. 319]} Pariston was personally chosen by Netero to be Vice Chairman because he is difficult to work with and not a yes man.^{[ch. 321]} Similar to Netero and Ging, he wants to have fun above all else, and throughout the chairman election suggests and agrees to terms that put him at a disadvantage as he neither wants to win nor lose.^{[ch. 331]} Pariston claims to feel happiness when people hate him and that he is compelled to hurt the things he holds dear.^{[ch. 343]} Within the Zodiacs, he is the sole extreme left patriot.^{[ch. 348]} He has the support of Temp Hunters, a pejorative term for Hunters who work government jobs subcontracted through the Association, via suspected kickbacks.^{[ch. 319, 331]} Pariston is the eventual winner of the 13th Hunter Chairman Election. However, he immediately appoints Cheadle his Vice Chairman and resigns from his new position.^{[ch. 335]} He then leaves the Zodiacs and joins Beyond Netero's expedition to the Dark Continent, although Ging also joins and buys him out of his position as second-in-command.^{[ch. 340, 343]}

== Hunter Association ==
The Hunter Association (ハンター協会, Hantā Kyōkai) is a non-governmental organization responsible for the testing and licensing of "Hunters" (ハンター, Hantā)—a person that has proven themselves through rigorous examination to be an elite member of humanity and who specializes in finding rare creatures, secret treasures, and other individuals. With the passing of the examination, a Hunter is awarded a license which bestows a number of benefits on the licensee. This results in massive registration numbers for the annual licensing exam with an extremely high failure rate.

=== Isaac Netero ===
Voiced by: Bunmei Tobayama (1999 series), Ichirō Nagai (2011 series, ep 6–114, The Last Mission), Banjō Ginga (2011 series, ep 122–126), (Japanese); Paul Hudson (1999 series), Ian Alden (2011 series) (English)

Isaac Netero (アイザック=ネテロ, Aizakku Netero) is the Chairman of the Selection Committee for the Hunter Exam.^{[ch. 13]} Presiding over it, he has final authority over every stage of the examination and is assisted by his secretary Beans (ビーンズ, Bīnzu), who helps organize the Hunter Exam and presents the successful candidates with their license. Netero claims to have been the strongest Nen user in the world over 50 years ago.^{[ch. 202]} Over 60 years ago, Netero spent four years rigorously training every day in order to express gratitude to the martial arts. He eventually attained enlightenment, giving him the ability to punch faster than the speed of sound and the power of the bodhisattva Guanyin.^{[ch. 265]} Netero is also the Grand Master of the Shingen-Ryu (心源流) style of Kung fu.^{[ch. 60]} Netero leads the team hired to exterminate the Chimera Ants, but after losing an arm and a leg and unable to inflict any significant damage on Meruem, he commits suicide by detonating The Poor Man's Rose (貧乏人のバラ, Binbōnin no Bara) bomb implanted in his own body.^{[ch. 298]} Survivors of the bomb's blast are eaten alive from the inside by poison, and can contaminate others.^{[ch. 311]} Isaac Netero is the father of Beyond Netero, whose existence was kept secret until his death.

=== Zodiacs ===
The Zodiacs (十二支ん, Jūnishin) are the high council of the Hunter Association composed of 12 top Hunters personally selected by Chairman Netero.^{[ch. 319]} They have a code name based on a sign of the Chinese zodiac, and are tasked to decide the nature of Netero's succession after his death. Out of loyalty to the chairman, most alter their behavior, physical traits, and even their legal names based on the animal each represents.^{[ch. 319]} With Beyond Netero and Kakin intent on an expedition to the Dark Continent, the Zodiacs travel with them as chaperones hired by the V5, a group of the five most powerful nations of the world. They also aim to explore it before Beyond, as asked by Chairman Netero.

==== Ging Freecss ====
Voiced by: Hiroki Tōchi (1999 series), Urara Takano (child, 1999 series), Rikiya Koyama (2011 series) (Japanese); Ben Jeffrey (1999 series), Marc Diraison (2011 series) (English)

Ging Freecss (ジン=フリークス, Jin Furīkusu) is a Double Star Ruins Hunter and Gon's father and motivation to become a Hunter.^{[ch. 326]} He left Whale Island to become a Hunter before he turned 12 years old, only returning ten years later to ask his grandmother to take care of Gon for a while.^{[ch. 65]} But Mito felt him unfit to parent and gained custody of Gon, and Ging never returned again.^{[ch. 65]} He is the main creator of the Greed Island video game, and is also the one who captured and placed Razor in the game. A member of the Zodiacs, his code name is the "Boar" and he is one of the only two members who do not mimic their corresponding animal.^{[ch. 319]} At the end of the chairman election, Ging at last meets Gon. He tells Gon to apologize to Kite and about the meaning of adventure before they once again part ways. He then resigns from the Zodiacs and joins Beyond Netero's expedition to the Dark Continent, buying his way into second-in-command in name only.^{[ch. 340, 347]}

Ging claims that he does not want to see Gon because he is too ashamed of himself for being absent in Gon's life due to his own selfishness, and challenges his son to find him.^{[ch. 66]} He appears confident in Gon's abilities and that he would become a Hunter; he left Gon a memory card for Greed Island and a recorded message with Mito, to give to him once he did. Ging apparently trusted that Gon would eventually recover from his hospitalization. All information about Ging is classified even in the official Hunter database.^{[ch. 38]} He is Kite's teacher and also inspired Satotz to become a Hunter.^{[ch. 1, 35, 38]} Chairman Netero once told Biscuit that Ging is one of the top five best Nen users in the world.^{[ch. 138]} Ging tied with Silva for 15th place in the series' first popularity poll.

==== Cheadle Yorkshire ====
Voiced by: Ikue Ohtani (Japanese); Cherami Leigh (English)

Cheadle Yorkshire (チードル=ヨークシャー, Chīdoru Yōkushā) is a woman from the Zodiacs code named the "Dog".^{[ch. 319]} She is a Triple Star Hunter, a doctor, and jurist known as the Disease Hunter.^{[ch. 326, 346]} She is generally shown as an intelligent person. In the chairman election, Cheadle repeatedly comes in second or third place, until she asks her supporters to vote for Leorio instead in order to prevent Pariston from winning.^{[ch. 332]} Pariston wins but gives his position to her because he only wanted to have fun.^{[ch. 335]} After she officially becomes chairman, Cheadle accepts the resignations of Ging and Pariston and the Zodiacs chaperone Beyond Netero's trip to the Dark Continent. On the expedition, she is a part of the science team and directs the center medical care facility on the third deck.^{[ch. 346, 359]}

==== Mizaistom Nana ====
Voiced by: Akio Ohtsuka (Japanese); Armen Taylor (English)

Mizaistom Nana (ミザイストム=ナナ, Mizaisutomu Nana), code named the "Ox",^{[ch. 319]} is a Double Star Crime Hunter and said to be a man with common sense.^{[ch. 326, 346]} He is also a lawyer and manages a private security company.^{[ch. 346]} Within the Zodiacs, he, Cheadle, Botobai and Ginta constitute the moderate conservative faction and often work together.^{[ch. 348]} At the end of the chairman election, Mizaistom asks his supporters to vote for Cheadle in order to prevent Pariston from winning.^{[ch. 332]} On the expedition, he is a part of the intelligence team and devotes his attention to decks three and four, where the crime rate is much higher than expected.^{[ch. 346, 358]} His ability Closed Courtroom: Cross Game (非公開法廷(クロスゲーム), Hikōkai Hōtei: Kurosu Gēmu) uses blue cards to admit people to his "courtroom", yellow to immobilize them, and red to dismiss them from the courtroom.^{[ch. 343, 348]}

==== Botobai Gigante ====
Voiced by: Issei Futamata (Japanese); Jason Marnocha (English)

Botobai Gigante (ボトバイ=ギガンテ, Botobai Gigante), code named the "Dragon",^{[ch. 319]} is a Triple Star Hunter.^{[ch. 326]} He is the most senior member of the Zodiacs and was close to Netero. He is a public prosecutor, military analyst, and Terrorist Hunter.^{[ch. 346]} Within the Zodiacs, he, Cheadle, Mizaistom and Ginta constitute the moderate conservative faction and often work together.^{[ch. 348]} On the expedition, he is a part of the defense team.^{[ch. 346]} He and Mizaistom help the royal troops and private security to maintain order and handle the criminal issues on the Black Whale, with Botobai also acting as a court official.^{[ch. 358, 359]}

==== Kanzai ====
Voiced by: Ryota Ohsaka (Japanese); Alejandro Saab (English)

Kanzai (カンザイ), code named the "Tiger",^{[ch. 319]} is a hot-tempered bodyguard and Treasure Hunter.^{[ch. 346]} He has a short temper as shown when he easily gets mad when Pariston and Hisoka tease him. Within the Zodiacs, he, Gel and Saccho constitute the liberal/apolitical faction and often work together.^{[ch. 348]} On the expedition, he is a part of the defense team and stands guard over Beyond's cell with Saccho and Saiyu.^{[ch. 346, 359]}

==== Pyon ====
Voiced by: Tomoka Kiriyama (Japanese); Kayli Mills (English)

Pyon (ピヨン, Piyon), code named the "Rabbit",^{[ch. 319]} is a linguist, interpreter and Paleograph Hunter.^{[ch. 346]} She appears to be proficient in technology, as she is often seen on her phone or a laptop. Within the Zodiacs, she, Cluck and Saiyu constitute the reform faction and often work together.^{[ch. 348]} During the later rounds of the chairman election, Pyon acts as master of ceremonies.^{[ch. 331]} On the expedition, she is a part of the intelligence team and makes software to recognize any ancient languages they might encounter on the Dark Continent.^{[ch. 346]}

==== Gel ====
Voiced by: Yuki Shirato (Japanese); Maureen Price (English)

Gel (ゲル, Geru), code named the "Snake",^{[ch. 319]} is a woman with a calm attitude. She has the ability to change her arms into a snake which she uses to briefly threaten Pariston when he suggests the Zodiacs to make him the Chairman without election. Within the Zodiacs, she, Kanzai and Saccho constitute the liberal/apolitical faction and often work together.^{[ch. 348]} She is a coroner, pharmacist and Poison Hunter.^{[ch. 346]} On the expedition, she is a part of the science team.^{[ch. 346]}

==== Cluck ====
Voiced by: Megumi Han (Japanese); Jeannie Tirado (English)

Cluck (クルック, Kurukku), code named the "Chicken",^{[ch. 319]} is one of the most short-tempered members in the Zodiacs. She appears to have the power to manipulate birds, as shown when she delivers all Hunters ballots for the election.^{[ch. 320]} Within the Zodiacs, she, Pyon and Saiyu constitute the reform faction and often work together.^{[ch. 348]} She is a musician, dancer, and Botanical Hunter.^{[ch. 346]} On the expedition, she is a part of the flora/fauna team and plans to collect intelligence and plants after landing.^{[ch. 346]}

==== Saccho Kobayakawa ====
Voiced by: Takuma Suzuki (Japanese); TBA (English)

Saccho Kobayakawa (サッチョウ=コバヤカワ, Satchō Kobayakawa), code named the "Horse",^{[ch. 319]} is a Double Star Problem Hunter.^{[ch. 326]} He appears to be very strict about the rules, and is known as the "Worry Hunter". He is a detective and handyman.^{[ch. 346]} Within the Zodiacs, he, Kanzai and Gel constitute the liberal/apolitical faction and often work together.^{[ch. 348]} On the expedition, he is a part of the intelligence team and stands guard over Beyond's cell with Kanzai and Saiyu.^{[ch. 346, 359]}

==== Ginta ====
Voiced by: Takuma Suzuki (Japanese); TBA (English)

Ginta (ギンタ), code named the "Sheep",^{[ch. 319]} is a ranger and Poacher Hunter.^{[ch. 346]} He seems to be very sensitive when it comes to Netero's death, but he gets very mad when Pariston suggests himself to be chairman without an election. Within the Zodiacs, he, Cheadle, Mizaistom and Botobai constitute the moderate conservative faction and often work together.^{[ch. 348]} On the expedition, he is a part of the flora/fauna team.^{[ch. 346]}

==== Saiyu ====
Voiced by: Velo Takeda (Japanese); Christopher Bevins (English)

Saiyu (サイユウ, Saiyū), code named the "Monkey",^{[ch. 319]} is a man whose appearance is reminiscent of the Monkey King. A Bounty Hunter and martial artist,^{[ch. 346]} he also has a staff as his weapon. His ability consists of three Nen Monkeys; See No Evil robs an opponent of their sight if the attack connects, Hear No Evil robs them of their hearing, and Speak No Evil robs them of their speech.^{[ch. 349]} Within the Zodiacs, he, Pyon and Cluck constitute the reform faction and often work together.^{[ch. 348]} He is Pariston's informant within the Zodiacs.^{[ch. 348]} On the expedition, he is a part of the defense team and stands guard over Beyond's cell with Kanzai and Saccho.^{[ch. 346, 359]}

=== Examiners ===
The Hunter Exam is divided into several stages, each one overseen by an experienced hunter. In the first shown exam in the series, the first examiner is Satotz (サトツ, Satotsu), who tests the candidates' stamina by leading them on a marathon of unknown length through a tunnel and a swampland filled with uniquely dangerous creatures.^{[ch. 6, 8]} The second stage of the exam is administered by two Gourmet Hunters, Buhara (ブハラ) and Menchi (メンチ). Although Menchi fails all of the candidates due to her stubbornness, Netero pressures her into giving the candidates an alternative test.^{[ch. 12]} The third stage is overseen by Bounty Hunter and prison warden Lippo (リッポー, Rippō),^{[ch. 17]} testing the candidates in different aspects of group dynamics, both in a communal and individual front. Chairman Netero organizes the final stage as a one-on-one fighting tournament, where the winner must get his opponent to admit defeat. In a twist, contestants pass the exam after winning only one fight with the loser advancing to the next round, meaning only one examinee will fail.^{[ch. 33]} Satotz came in seventh and 22nd place in the series' first two popularity polls.

=== Examinees ===
The examinees that took part in the 287th annual Hunter Exam, the year the series' main characters took the exam.

==== Hanzo ====
Voiced by: Yoshiaki Matsumoto (1999 series), Daisuke Kishio (2011 series) (Japanese); Lucas Gilbertson (1999 series), Ray Chase (2011 series) (English)

Hanzo (ハンゾー, Hanzō) is an 18-year-old shinobi who has trained in the art of ninjutsu since he was born.^{[ch. 34, 38]} He decided to become a Hunter in order to find the elusive Hermit's Scroll.^{[ch. 6]} In the second test of the exam, featuring cooking, he is the only one to know what sushi is, as it is a dish from his home country, Japan.^{[ch. 11]} In the final test of the Hunter Exam, Hanzo is put against Gon in a fight where one of them must admit defeat.^{[ch. 33]} Despite his speed, strength, and battle experience easily exceeding that of Gon, Gon refuses even after Hanzo breaks his arm. Noting the lack of hate in Gon's eyes after this act, Hanzo realizes he actually has come to like him. He willingly bows out of the battle, giving Gon the victory needed for him to pass the exam.^{[ch. 33]} Hanzo wins and passes the exam himself when he threatens the same to Pokkle in his next match, becoming a licensed Hunter.^{[ch. 35]} It is later stated by Wing that Hanzo learned Nen after the Hunter Exam.^{[ch. 60]} Hanzo later reappears in the Dark Continent arc as part of Kurapika's party and becomes a bodyguard of prince Momoze.^{[ch. 350]} Ordered by her mother to protect Marayam instead of Momoze, a furious Hanzo blames himself when Momoze is killed and vows to make the murderer pay.^{[ch. 368]} Hanzo came in eighth and 16th place in the series' first two popularity polls.

==== Tonpa ====
Voiced by: Kohei Kowada (1999 series), Toshiharu Sakurai (2011 series) (Japanese); Gerald Matthews (1999 series), Michael Sorich (2011 series) (English)

Tonpa (トンパ) is nicknamed the "Rookie Crusher" by candidates with more experience taking the exam. He has taken the exam for 35 consecutive terms,^{[ch. 5]} never managing to pass. He often brags of his experience to those taking the exam for the first time and offers them a helping hand. This is merely subterfuge, as he takes a perverse pleasure in sabotaging their attempts to get the license.^{[ch. 17]} This time around, he trails Gon, Killua, Kurapika, and Leorio while attempting various means to foil their advancement. In order to do this, he uses methods like spiking drinks with a strong laxative and being contradictory simply to delay progress in a time-sensitive arena.^{[ch. 5, 16]} He also attends the following Hunter Exam, where he, along with everyone else, is defeated by Killua.^{[ch. 148]}

==== Pokkle ====
Voiced by: Yukiko Tamaki (1999 series), Yukitoshi Tokumoto (2011 series) (Japanese); Graden Gant (1999 series), Bobby Thong (2011 series) (English)

Pokkle (ポックル, Pokkuru) is an accomplished archer that carries a bow and quiver of arrows wherever he goes. The arrows are tipped with a potent tranquilizer that, even with a small nick, induces paralysis for any person for up to a week.^{[ch. 24]} Pokkle's aim is to become a successful hunter of undocumented fantastic beasts.^{[ch. 38]} He passes the exam and becomes a licensed Hunter. Pokkle is then seen in N.G.L. with Ponzu and several others before their group is attacked by Chimera Ants.^{[ch. 190]} Pokkle is poisoned by Zazan and brought to the colony to be fed to the Queen, but, using a hidden antidote, is able to restore some movement and hide before the Chimera Ants start searching for him for his knowledge on Nen.^{[ch. 197]} However, the newly born Neferpitou senses Pokkle hiding and he is subjected to his brain being prodded by the Royal Guard to divulge everything he knows about Nen before being killed.^{[ch. 198]} Pokkle's Nen ability, Seven Spectrum Array: Rainbow (7つのスペクトル アレイ(レインボウ), 7-Tsu no Supekutoru Arei: Reinbō), creates a bow in his left hand and an arrow in his right; red arrows burst into flames on contact and orange are his fastest.^{[ch. 190]} Pokkle came in 12th and 18th place in the series' first two popularity polls.

==== Ponzu ====
Voiced by: Umi Tenjin (1999 series), Haruka Kudō (2011 series) (Japanese); Leda Davies (1999 series), Reba Buhr (2011 series) (English)

Ponzu (ポンズ) is one of the 24 that managed to enter the fourth stage of the Hunter Exam.^{[ch. 23]} She fights using chemical weapons, a wide variety of toxins, and prefers to set traps instead of fighting head on.^{[ch. 25]} Her secret weapon lies within her round cap, carrying neurotoxic bees under the surface that emerge and attack her enemies when she is threatened.^{[ch. 31]} During this stage, her bees instinctively end up killing Bourbon after she falls into his trap. Ponzu is rescued by Gon, but her badge is taken when she is unconscious so Leorio can pass, causing her to fail the exam.^{[ch. 31]} She also attends the following Hunter Exam, where she, along with everyone else, is defeated by Killua.^{[ch. 148]} Ponzu is then seen in N.G.L. with Pokkle and several others before their group is attacked by Chimera Ants.^{[ch. 190]} The group is killed by Zazan's squad, but she escapes long enough to send one of her bees with a message to the strongest Hunter nearby, who happens to be Kite. She is shot and eaten moments later by a gun-wielding Chimera Ant.^{[ch. 190]} Ponzu came in ninth place in the series' first popularity poll.

=== Chimera Ant Exterminators ===
With the infestation of man-sized Chimera Ants within N.G.L., the Hunter Association sends an official team to investigate and contain the threat. The extermination team is led by none other than Chairman Netero himself. Netero handpicks those who are to accompany him, causing significant political bickering within the Hunter Association.

==== Morel Mackernasey ====
Voiced by: Taiten Kusunoki (Japanese); Kyle Hebert (English)

Morel Mackernasey (モラウ=マッカーナーシ, Morau Makkānāshi) is a Hunter and member of the team tasked with exterminating the Chimera Ants.^{[ch. 199]} A tough yet very compassionate man with long hair and sunglasses, he is Knuckle Bine and Shoot McMahon's master, and acknowledged by Netero to be about equal to himself.^{[ch. 200, 202]} He uses a giant smoking pipe and the smoke produced by it as his weapons. With his Nen ability Smoke Troopers: Deep Purple (スモークトルーパー(ディープパープル), Sumōku Torūpā: Dīpu Pāpuru), Morel creates smoke puppets that act independently from him once commands are issued.^{[ch. 244]} Morel shows himself as an experienced and resourceful fighter, such as in his fight against Leol wherein he uses his pipe as a snorkel to allow himself to breathe underwater, and in doing so suffocates his opponent with emitted carbon dioxide. After the Chimera Ant incident is resolved, Morel is expected to be promoted to Triple Star Hunter.^{[ch. 326]}

==== Knov ====
Voiced by: Shin-ichiro Miki (Japanese); Grant George (English)

Knov (ノヴ, Novu) is a Hunter and member of the team tasked with exterminating the Chimera Ants.^{[ch. 199]} An intelligent man dressed in glasses and a suit, he is Palm's master and a target of her affections, and acknowledged by Netero to be about equal to himself.^{[ch. 200, 202]} Knov's Nen ability Fourth-Dimensional Mansion: Hide and Seek (四次元の館(ハイドアンドシーク), Shi-jigen no Yakata: Haido ando Shīku) is similar to teleportation in that he creates portals to a Nen dimension.^{[ch. 246]} Inside this four-floor Nen mansion, he can store items or people. While others can only exit from a predetermined place, Knov can use his master key to exit from any previously set portal he wants.^{[ch. 246]} While infiltrating Meruem's palace solo in order to place portals, Knov sees Shaiapouf's aura, which frightens him so much that he suffers a severe nervous breakdown.^{[ch. 251, 252]} When he later returns to save the injured during the attack, his black hair has turned white from the psychological trauma.^{[ch. 290]}

==== Knuckle Bine ====
Voiced by: Wataru Takagi (Japanese); Benjamin Diskin (English)

Knuckle Bine (ナックル=バイン, Nakkuru Bain) is a Beast Hunter and Morel's pupil.^{[ch. 200, 201]} Despite appearing to be an aggressive man, Knuckle is very compassionate and easily moved to tears. He also gets along well with animals, having the habit of taking care of abandoned pets.^{[ch. 206]} Knuckle's Nen ability is Hakoware: Bankruptcy, Chapter Seven (破産、第7章(ハコワレ), Hakoware: Hasan, dai 7-shō), where by lending some aura to his opponent via a punch, he attaches a small indestructible Nen-creature called Amortizing Power Redirector (償却電力リダイレクター, Shōkyaku denryoku ridairekutā) or A.P.R. for short.^{[ch. 211]} It follows the opponent wherever they go and grows each successive time Knuckle hits them and by 10% interest on the borrowed aura every ten seconds.^{[ch. 211]} The opponent pays Knuckle back by hitting him, but he will not take damage until the debt is fully paid, and if the aura count exceeds their total remaining aura, the opponent goes bankrupt. At this point A.P.R. transforms into Individual Ren Suppressor (個別の Ren サプレッサー, Kobetsu no Ren Sapuressā) or I.R.S. for short, which attaches itself and forces the debtor into Zetsu unable to use Nen for 30 days.^{[ch. 211]} A drawback is that A.P.R. can only be activated on a single person at a time.

==== Shoot McMahon ====
Voiced by: Yuji Ueda (Japanese); D.C. Douglas (English)

Shoot McMahon (シュート=マクマホン, Shūto Makumahon) is an Unidentified Beast Hunter with one arm and Morel's pupil.^{[ch. 200, 205]} Shoot's Nen ability is Dark Inn: Hotel Rafflesia (ダークイン(ホテル・ラフレシア), Dāku In: Hoteru Rafureshia) and involves manipulating a cage and three disembodied hands that levitate.^{[ch. 212]} Shoot can shrink and seal off what is hit by his hands, in the cage.^{[ch. 222]} He has a timid personality and is often afraid of taking advantage of opportune times to attack his enemy.^{[ch. 205]} In the fight against Youpi during the extermination team's raid on East Gorteau, Shoot becomes inspired by Gon, and by facing adversity is able to overcome his timidness and fight without concern for his life.^{[ch. 266]}

==== Palm Siberia ====
Voiced by: Kikuko Inoue (Japanese); Karen Strassman (English)

Palm Siberia (パーム=シベリア, Pāmu Shiberia) is the pupil of Knov, for whom she has affections.^{[ch. 200]} In order for her to accompany Knov on the extermination, Gon and Killua must defeat Knuckle and Shoot within one month, so Palm contacts Biscuit to train them further.^{[ch. 200, 201]} On most occasions, she appears disheveled and stressed, exuding a frightening aura. However, she is depicted as quite beautiful when dressed up.^{[ch. 218]} She develops a crush on Gon, but is unable to further their relationship. Palm can see the location of anyone she has seen with her own eyes by using a small mermaid crystal ball relic fed by her blood.^{[ch. 220]} Palm is sent into the Chimera Ant King's palace undercover as a secretary to Director Bizeff, the man who actually ran East Gorteau behind the scenes, in order to lay eyes on the King and Royal Guards and track them.^{[ch. 250, 252]} She is captured and transformed into a Chimera Ant-hybrid, with the Nen ability Fury of Shadows: Black Widow (影の激怒(ブラックウィドウ), Kage no Gekido: Burakku Widō) creating defensive outfits from her hair wrapping over her body.^{[ch. 293, 294]} Killua manages to help Palm regain her memories and return to the side of the Hunters. Palm's clairvoyant ability reformed into Wink Blue (ウィンクブルー({{{2}}}), Winku Burū), which enables her to see the last three people seen by her right eye in the crystal ball on her forehead when she covers that same eye.^{[ch. 304]}

=== Others ===
==== Kite ====
Voiced by: Shigeru Nakahara (1998 film), Yūji Kishi (1999 series), Shūichi Ikeda (2011 series), Uki Satake (Chimera Ant), (Japanese); Adam Hunter (1999 series), Chris Smith (2011 series), Laura Stahl (Chimera Ant) (English)

Kite (カイト, Kaito) is the very first Hunter introduced in the story. A student of Ging Freecss, Gon's father, he traveled to Whale Island three years prior to the start of the series looking for leads in order to pass his final test, find Ging.^{[ch. 1]} After saving Gon from a foxbear, Kite revealed to him that his father is alive and the best Hunter there is, inspiring Gon to follow in his father's footsteps.^{[ch. 1]} After completing Greed Island, Gon runs into Kite again by teleporting to the player named "NIGG", who, after finding Ging, is in the middle of a biological survey searching for new species in the country of Kakin.^{[ch. 185,186]} He is leading a team of young would-be Hunters named Banana Kavaro, Lin Koshi, Monta Yuras, Podungo Lapoy, Spinner Clow, and Stick Dinner. His Nen ability is Mad Clown: Crazy Slots (マッドピエロ(クレイジースロット), Maddo Piero: Kureijī Surotto) where a clown-head randomly chooses a number from 1 to 9 and summons respective weapons, which he can not put away until he uses.^{[ch. 194]}

Kite is killed by Neferpitou and his body rebuilt into a manipulated puppet to train the Chimera Ants.^{[ch. 222]} He is captured by Knuckle and Shoot, with Gon vowing to save him and get revenge. It is later revealed that Meruem's twin sister found on the Queen's corpse is Kite reborn as a female Chimera Ant.^{[ch. 316]} Ging claims that Crazy Slots has a number that only comes up when Kite "really doesn't want to die" and suspects this is the reason he is "alive".^{[ch. 335]} While named Reina by Colt, Kite quickly matured while regaining the memories and personality of her former human male self and helps snap Gon out of his depression. Kite also forces Koala (コアラ, Koara), the koala-humanoid Chimera Ant hitman, to become her subordinate as penitence for the death of a girl whose physical appearance Kite has assumed as a Chimera Ant.^{[ch. 337]} Kite came in tenth place in the series' first popularity poll.

==== Izunavi ====
Voiced by: Kazuki Yao (1999 series, ep 45), Tsuyoshi Koyama (1999 series, ep 56), Masaki Aizawa (2011 series) (Japanese); Imari Williams (2011 series) (English)

Izunavi (イズナビ, Izunabi), named Mizuken (ミズケン) in the 2011 anime, is a Hunter and Kurapika's Nen teacher. Izunavi teaches him about Nen and informs him of the ability to make Contracts that strengthen the abilities based on how strict the limitation the user places.^{[ch. 83]} He reappears in the Dark Continent arc as part of Kurapika's party, becoming a bodyguard of prince Tyson.^{[ch. 350]} Izunavi came in 24th place in the series' second popularity poll.

==== Melody ====
Voiced by: Tarako Isono (1999 series), Miina Tominaga (2011 series) (Japanese); Dorothy Elias-Fahn (2011 series) (English)

Melody (センリツ, Senritsu) is a Music Hunter and is the kind and understanding member of Neon's bodyguards.^{[ch. 73]} She is always ready to listen to anyone's confessions and has the gift to put people at ease. As Leorio notes, she is one of the very few characters who have made Kurapika open up to them. Melody's physical appearance is in sharp contrast to her kind soul. Due to effects of the "Sonata of Darkness", a musical piece said to have been written by Satan himself, casting on whoever listens to it a great curse, her body is short and her right arm disfigured.^{[ch. 73]} One night, Melody and her friend were drunk, and her friend played the Sonata. Its power was so great, that upon hearing only the first movement of the flute solo, Melody was disfigured. Her friend was not so lucky; his entire body was disfigured like Melody's arm and he died after playing it. Melody gained her Nen abilities in exchange. Melody's goal is to find the Sonata of Darkness and destroy it.^{[ch. 73]} Melody has the ability to Emit her aura to people to soothe fatigue when she plays an instrument. Melody also has a very sharp sense of hearing and can tell a person's psychological state just by listening to their heartbeat.^{[ch. 121]} For example, she knows when people are lying or when someone has completely lost his/her temper. Melody reappears in the Dark Continent arc as part of Kurapika's party, becoming a bodyguard of prince Kacho.^{[ch. 350]} Melody was inspired by Nausicaä and Yupa in Hayao Miyazaki's Nausicaä of the Valley of the Wind, or possibly Ashitaka from Princess Mononoke instead of Yupa. Melody came in 20th place in the series' second popularity poll.

==== Basho ====
Voiced by: Hidenobu Kiuchi (1999 series), Toru Nakane (2011 series) (Japanese); Jake Eberle (2011 series) (English)

Basho (バショウ, Bashō) is one of Neon Nostrade's new bodyguards, hired along with Kurapika. When first introduced, he is quick to underestimate Kurapika, but after Kurapika's display of his Dowsing Chain, he grows respect for him. Basho returns in the Dark Continent storyline as part of Kurapika's infiltration party, becoming a bodyguard of the prince Luzurus.^{[ch. 350]} His Nen ability is called The Wandering Haiku Poet ((放浪の俳人, Hōrō no Haijin)), wherein Basho writes a haiku describing a condition on a piece of paper (such as "Anything I hit will explode"), which then comes true.^{[ch. 68]}

== Zoldyck Family ==
=== Zeno Zoldyck ===
Voiced by: Tadashi Miyazawa (1999 series), Hiroshi Ohtake (2011 series) (Japanese); Sam Mann (2011 series) (English)

Zeno Zoldyck (ゼノ=ゾルディック, Zeno Zorudikku) is Killua's grandfather and Silva's father. A witty old man, his advancing age has not dampened his quick thinking and speed in battle. Zeno wears alternating signs on his garb that say either "A Kill a Day" or "Never Retire".^{[ch. 95]} He appears to be on good terms with Chairman Netero, who hires Zeno for the initial assault on the palace in East Gorteau in order to catch the Chimera Ants off guard.^{[ch. 263]} He noticeably hesitates in the battle when he realizes the King has come to care for the safety of a human prisoner. Zeno favors Killua more than his other grandchildren. Zeno is a Transmutation-type Nen user, and his first Nen ability allows him to emit Nen blasts with the palm of his hand.^{[ch. 98]} Dragon Head: Dragon Head Caricature (龍頭戯画(ドラゴンヘッド})) allows him to transmute his aura to resemble a dragon. The Dragon Head can work both as a transportation and an offensive ability.^{[ch. 264, 268]} With Abrupt Fang: Dragon Lance (牙突(ドラゴンランス), Totsuzen no Kiba: Doragon Ransu), Zeno can use the precise motion of his hands to control the Dragon Head.^{[ch. 99, 146]} Zeno can then use Wyvern Meteor Storm: Dragon Dive (龍星群(ドラゴンダイブ), Waibān Meteo Sutōmu: Doragon Daibu) to shatter the Dragon Head into hundreds of smaller auras in order to rain down from the sky.^{[ch. 263]}

Zeno came in ninth place in the series' second popularity poll.

=== Silva Zoldyck ===
Voiced by: Kouji Ishii (1999 series), Kouichi Yamadera (2011 series) (Japanese); Chris Tergliafera (2011 series) (English)

Silva Zoldyck (シルバ=ゾルディック, Shiruba Zorudikku) is Killua's father. A silent, pensive figure, Killua's interaction with him seems limited. He allows Killua to go along with Gon on their journey to find his father, but only because he sees it as a crucial step in his development as the head assassin of the Zoldyck Family.^{[ch. 42]} During the auction in Yorknew City, Silva and Zeno are both hired by the Ten Dons to assassinate the Phantom Troupe, but withdraw from the job when their clients are killed due to a job taken by Illumi, Maha, and Kalluto.^{[ch. 100]} This was Silva's second time fighting Chrollo Lucilfer,^{[ch. 99]} and according to Killua, he previously killed an unknown member of the Phantom Troupe.^{[ch. 80]} Silva later appears amid the assault on the Palace in East Gorteau, killing Cheetu on the way to pick up his father. Silva tied with Ging for 15th place in the series' first popularity poll, and placed 13th in the second.

=== Kikyo Zoldyck ===
Voiced by: Rena Yukie (1999 series), Junko Iwao (2011 series), (Japanese); Michelle Ruff (2011 series) (English)

Kikyo Zoldyck (キキョウ=ゾルディック, Kikyō Zorudikku) is Killua's mother. She was injured attempting to prevent Killua from running away from home to take the Hunter Exam, although she is proud of Killua for doing so.^{[ch. 36]} She seems to be slightly paranoid and is cautious of Killua's friends. Kikyo is looking forward to Killua excelling in assassination and anticipates that one day, he will continue the family business. According to Illumi, Killua is her favorite son. Kikyo came in 13th place in the series' first popularity poll.

=== Milluki Zoldyck ===
Voiced by: Katashi Ishizuka (1999 series), Kimiko Saito (2011 series) (Japanese); Laila Berzins (2011 series) (English)

Milluki Zoldyck (ミルキ=ゾルディック, Miruki Zorudikku) is Killua's second eldest brother and an obese figure who possesses a strong aversion to performing any kind of physical activity. He seems to be a sort of otaku, since his room is covered with figurines from various anime, manga and video games.^{[ch. 69]} Milluki is talented in hacking computer systems, as Killua asks him to hack a memory card from Ging. He was also injured during Killua's escape.^{[ch. 36]} Milluki is in charge of torturing Killua as punishment, but does not have the drive to carry it out very long as he becomes physically exhausted.^{[ch. 42]} After being tipped off by Killua on the whereabouts of a Greed Island cartridge, Milluki's excitement results in one of the rarer moments in which he makes an outside expedition in search of the game, he himself states that he had not left the mansion in eight years. However, he is unable to win a copy and leaves in frustration.

=== Alluka Zoldyck ===
Voiced by: Maaya Uchida (Japanese); Xanthe Huynh (English)

Alluka Zoldyck (アルカ=ゾルディック, Aruka Zorudikku) is the second youngest sibling of Killua. While the other members of the Zoldyck family refer to Alluka as male or as an object, Killua, who is the closest to Alluka, states that Alluka is female.^{[ch. 320, 321, 324]} Alluka is a dark child with the ability to grant wishes and a second personality, named Nanika (何か; "Something") by Killua.^{[ch. 323]} Once a person grants three requests made by Alluka, Nanika grants their wish.^{[ch. 322]} The bigger the wish, the bigger Alluka's demands will be for the next person.^{[ch. 322]} If four of Alluka's demands are refused in a row, at least two people, the refusee and their closest friend/love, will die.^{[ch. 322]} A larger wish requires more deaths in the next round when the demands are refused; dying in the order of the amount of time they have spent with the refusee.^{[ch. 322, 323]} Once people die in refusal, the demands "reset" to the lowest difficulty level.^{[ch. 324]} Because Alluka's power is considered too dangerous, Alluka is locked up alone in a room full of toys. Fearing that Killua will ask Alluka's help to save Gon's life, Illumi asks for Hisoka's help in searching for and killing Alluka, as Alluka poses a grave danger to the entire Zoldyck family in the case of Killua getting killed by Alluka's power.^{[ch. 323]} Killua eventually has Alluka cure Gon without consequence, as he can make demands of Nanika without paying a price.^{[ch. 333, 336]} After Gon is healed, Killua demands Nanika not grant anyone else's wishes and starts traveling together with Alluka.^{[ch. 336, 338]} The caption to a standalone illustration of Alluka in Volume 33 of Hunter × Hunter reads "Ai. I'm from the Dark Continent", possibly suggesting that Alluka's power is due to the Gaseous Life-form: Ai (アイ) that humans brought back from the Dark Continent.^{[ch. 341]}

=== Maha Zoldyck ===
Maha Zoldyck (マハ゠ゾルディック, Maha Zorudikku) is the oldest living member of the Zoldyck family. He is the grandfather of Zeno and has only made non-speaking appearances. During the events of Yorknew City, Maha assisted his great-great-grandsons in assassinating the Ten Dons of the Mafia Community.^{[ch. 100]}

== Greed Island players ==
Greed Island (グリードアイランド) is a video game created by Ging Freecss and ten of his friends for the "Joystation" video game console in 1987, exclusively for Hunters who know Nen.^{[ch. 69, 184]} Only 100 copies were made that sold for 5.8 billion jenny (the currency of Hunter × Hunter), the highest ever for a video game.^{[ch. 69]} The game seemingly transports its players' physical bodies into "the world" of Greed Island (though it is actually an isolated island that exists in the real world),^{[ch. 134]} only releasing them when they die (at which point they die in real life too), when they win, or when they use a special card in the game that lets them out.

=== Biscuit Krueger ===
Voiced by: Chieko Higuchi (Greed Island OVA), Akiko Kimura (GI Final OVA, child form), Takashi Hagino (GI Final OVA, adult form), Chisa Yokoyama (2011 series), (Japanese); Tara Sands (2011 series) (English)

Biscuit Krueger (ビスケット クルーガー, Bisuketto Kurūgā) is a Double Star Stone Hunter who Gon and Killua team up with in Greed Island.^{[ch. 137, 326]} Although she appears to be a little girl, her true form is actually that of a massive and extremely muscular 57-year-old woman several times the size.^{[ch. 137, 177]} Biscuit stays in this young girl form because she hates her actual appearance, but receives a tremendous power boost when she transforms back to her real appearance.^{[ch. 177]} Her goal in Greed Island is to obtain a gem found only in the game, Blue Planet.^{[ch. 138]} She becomes Gon and Killua's second teacher, and is also the teacher of Wing, the man who first teaches Nen to Gon and Killua.^{[ch. 137]} After the events of Greed Island, Biscuit later helps Gon and Killua train for their battles against Knuckle and Shoot during the Chimera Ant arc.^{[ch. 201]} She later joins Kurapika's party at Killua's request during the Dark Continent arc, becoming a guard of prince Marayam.^{[ch. 350]} Biscuit Krueger is also a transmuter.

=== Tsezguerra ===
Voiced by: Ryūji Mizuki (Greed Island OVA), Kiyoyuki Yanada (2011 series) (Japanese); Tim Friedlander (2011 series) (English)

Tsezguerra (ツェズゲラ, Tsezugera) is an experienced Single Star Jackpot Hunter.^{[ch. 125]} He is hired by multibillionaire Battera (バッテラ) to beat Greed Island and to test the people who want to enter the game in order to earn the 50-billion-jenny prize money offered by Battera.^{[ch. 125]} He and his team ally with Gon, Killua, Biscuit, Hisoka and Goreinu to take part in the dodgeball game against Razor.^{[ch. 160]} He and his team later engage Genthru's in a game of chase in order to buy time for Gon to train against Genthru and for Killua to heal his injuries.^{[ch. 170]}

=== Nickes ===
Voiced by: Kenji Nomura (Greed Island OVA), Hiroshi Yanaka (2011 series) (Japanese); Chris Jai Alex (2011 series) (English)

Nickes (ニックス, Nikkusu) is a Greed Island player and the leader of his own group consisting of numerous other players including Abengane and Genthru^{[ch. 142]}, which they will attempt to work together in beating the game. However, after Genthru revealed himself to be the Bomber and placed a bomb on them^{[ch. 142]}, he was later killed along with most of his members.^{[ch. 144]}

=== Abengane ===
Voiced by: Daisuke Hirakawa (Greed Island OVA), Eiji Hanawa (2011 series) (Japanese); Jalen K. Cassell (2011 series) (English)

Abengane (アベンガネ) is an exorcist; a Nen user with the ability to remove Nen "curses" or attacks placed onto himself or others.^{[ch. 120, 147]} The Nen Beasts he summons to eat the Nen curses placed on himself, attach themselves onto him until he fulfills the original condition for removing the curse or the original caster dies.^{[ch. 147]} As one of the players hired by Battera to complete Greed Island, the Phantom Troupe and Hisoka find Abengane in the game and hire him to remove the curse placed on Chrollo by Kurapika.^{[ch. 183]}

=== Goreinu ===
Voiced by: Kōsuke Toriumi (Greed Island OVA), Hidetaka Tenjin (2011 series) (Japanese); Edward Bosco (2011 series) (English)

Goreinu (ゴレイヌ) is a Greed Island player who allies with Gon's party in the dodgeball game against Razor.^{[ch. 154]} His Nen ability is to form two gorillas out of Nen.^{[ch. 161]} He seems to control the gorillas and can quickly swap the position of them with his own or also with someone other, friend or foe. He later joins Tsezguerra's team and is the one who gives Gon, Killua, and Biscuit the remaining cards needed to win Greed Island.^{[ch. 169, 182]}

=== Razor ===
Voiced by: Tōru Furusawa (Greed Island OVA), Takaya Kuroda (2011 series) (Japanese); George C. Cole (2011 series) (English)

Razor (レイザー, Reizā) is one of the Game Masters and a creator of Greed Island.^{[ch. 145]} Razor was told by Gon's father not to hold back against his son should he ever come to Greed Island.^{[ch. 161]} Razor is a key person in getting one of the hardest cards in the game; the challengers must confront Razor and his 14 devils in a group of 15 people, and defeat them in different sporting events. It is learned that the 14 devils were not his allies, but Razor's own ability to emit 14 Nen creatures at will.^{[ch. 161]} He is defeated in a dodgeball game by Gon's allied party (consisting of Gon, Killua, Biscuit, Hisoka, and several other players hired by Battera). Razor reveals to Gon that he is a death row convict captured by Ging and brought to the island.^{[ch. 169]}

== Kakin ==
Kakin (カキン) is a kingdom located in the middle of the Azian Continent that experienced quick economic growth after shifting from social imperialism to a parliamentary democracy 30 years ago in what was called the "Most Silent Revolution in History".^{[ch. 340]} Since then it has sought to expand its influence internationally and after announcing an expedition to the Dark Continent, the V5 offer Kakin a seat among them, extending the council to six countries and renaming it the V6, in order to gain control over the expedition and its spoils, as well as to prevent possible predicaments.^{[ch. 346]} All of the ruler's legitimate children receive the official title of "prince", regardless of sex, and are ranked according to their order of birth, although the ranks grant few special privileges over each other and act mostly as a means to address them.^{[ch. 349]} The illegitimate children, on the other hand, are forbidden from appearing in public or taking part in the kingdom's politics and have their faces slashed with razors twice, leaving scars as proof of their lower status.^{[ch. 378]} To choose its next ruler, a deadly game among the princes is being held to decide the rightful successor on board the giant Dark Continent transport ship titled the Black Whale No.1, a fact that is hidden from the public.^{[ch. 348]} The princes each acquire a Guardian Spirit Beast (守護霊獣, Shugo Reijū), a parasitic Nen Beast that feeds on their aura and metamorphoses into a form and ability based on their disposition, that they can not see or control via the Seed Urn Ceremony before boarding the ship.^{[ch. 349, 360]} Guardian Spirit Beasts created from the same "vessel" do not kill each other and do not directly attack other hosts.^{[ch. 362]}

=== Royal Family ===
==== Nasubi Hui Guo Rou ====
Nasubi Hui Guo Rou (ナスビ=ホイコーロ, Nasubi Hoikōro) is the ruler and king of Kakin and sponsor of Beyond Netero's expedition to the Dark Continent. A charismatic and enthusiastic man on the outside, Nasubi hides a cold and ruthless side from the public as he shows no remorse in having his own children killed in the succession game. He has eight wives and 14 legitimate children.^{[ch. 349]}

==== Benjamin Hui Guo Rou ====
Benjamin Hui Guo Rou (ベンジャミン=ホイコーロ, Benjamin Hoikōro) is the first prince of Kakin and Nasubi's eldest son with his first wife, Unma (ウンマ).^{[ch. 349]} Although a very strong and aggressive man, when reasoned with using relevant information he is flexible but stern, and always makes sound judgements.^{[ch. 363]} He has no qualms about killing his own siblings and seems to have a rivalry with Tserriednich, his sibling from the same mother.^{[ch. 348]} As Deputy Military Adviser of the Kakin Royal Army, Benjamin is able to order some of his personal guards to protect the other princes. These guards have authorization to kill in self-defense if they feel threatened, and are secretly tasked with learning people's Nen abilities.^{[ch. 363]} He was already a Nen user before the succession game began.^{[ch. 363]} His ability "Those Who Inherit the Stars": Benjamin Baton (星を継ぐもの(ベンジャミン・バトン), Hoshi Wotsu Gumono-tachi: Benjamin Baton) allows him to inherit the Nen abilities of people upon their death, as long as they were members of his private army who graduated from Kakin's Royal Military Academy and swore loyalty to him.^{[ch. 373]}.

==== Camilla Hui Guo Rou ====
Camilla Hui Guo Rou (カミーラ=ホイコーロ, Kamīra Hoikōro) is the second prince of Kakin, Nasubi's eldest daughter and first child with his second wife, Duazul (ドゥアズル, Duazuru). While charming, she is sadistic and answers to no one but her father. She orders her mother to get close to and kill Halkenburg.^{[ch. 366]} Her Nen ability, "The Cat Who Lived a Million Times": Cat's Name (猫の名前, 100 Man-kai Ikita Neko: Neko no Namae; 100万回生きた猫(ネコノナマエ)), is a giant cat Nen Beast that activates after death and fully resurrects Camilla by taking the life of her killer.^{[ch. 373]} Her Guardian Spirit Beast, which has a silhouette resembling that of a tree with breasts for its crown, is a Manipulator with a coercive-type ability that takes complete control of a target once certain conditions are met.^{[ch. 375]}

==== Zhang Lei Hui Guo Rou ====
Zhang Lei Hui Guo Rou (チョウライ=ホイコーロ, Chōrai Hoikōro) is the third prince of Kakin and Nasubi's only son with his third wife, Tang Zhao Li (トウチョウレイ, Tō Chō Rei).^{[ch. 349]} While a diplomatic pacifist who takes pleasure in luxury, he allied himself with the Xi-Yu crime family as he believes a true king should make use of both the light and the dark sides of society. By his own admission he has a tendency to worry more about what happens after he becomes king than about the hurdles to reach the crown. His Guardian Spirit Beast is a Conjurer that produces a coin on a daily basis.^{[ch. 376]} The possessor of a coin can gain various abilities after fulfilling certain conditions.^{[ch. 376]} The coins increase in denomination on the tenth day after being produced, but reset to one if they change ownership afterward.^{[ch. 404]} Zhang Lei estimates that handing out the coins would manifest their power once he is king, making him ironclad when it happens, yet apparently useless to the holder until then.

==== Tserriednich Hui Guo Rou ====
Tserriednich Hui Guo Rou (ツェリードニヒ=ホイコーロ, Tserīdonihi Hoikōro) is the fourth prince of Kakin and Nasubi's second son with Unma.^{[ch. 349]} A rather erudite and placid man on the outside, Tserriednich is actually a sociopath who indulges himself with grotesque acts of cruelty and murder and possesses a vast collection of human body parts, including several scarlet eyes from the Kurta clan.^{[ch. 345, 349]} He sends two guards to attend Kurapika's Nen lessons, telling them to kill everyone should they fail to learn Nen in two weeks.^{[ch. 369]} Theta (テータ, Tēta), one of his private guards, is ordered by Tserriednich to teach him Nen, and although she tries to drag it out as long as possible fearing what an evil man like him could do with it, he is revealed to be an extremely fast learner.^{[ch. 362, 368]} A Specialist, Tserriednich's Nen ability allows him to see ten seconds into the future allowing events to play out as an illusion to all nearby while acting independently.^{[ch. 387]} His Guardian Spirit Beast resembles a horse with feminine facial features, a long extendable neck, four fingered hands, and high heel shoes.^{[ch. 362]} The beast hides another face inside its mouth and has the ability to curse anyone who lies to him by creating wounds on their face, which develop into a rash should that person lie to him again.^{[ch. 376, 385]} Additionally, Tserriednich develops his own Nen Beast separate from his Guardian Spirit Beast.^{[ch. 384]}

==== Tubeppa Hui Guo Rou ====
Tubeppa Hui Guo Rou (ツベッパ=ホイコーロ, Tsubeppa Hoikōro) is the fifth prince of Kakin and Nasubi's second daughter with Duazul.^{[ch. 349]} Tomboyish compared to her sisters, she values modesty and is analytical of her competition as she intends to kill off her older siblings while reprieving her younger siblings once gaining the throne. Tubeppa offers to form a truce with Woble if Kurapika will tell her guard captain Maor (マオール, Maōru) everything about Nen.^{[ch. 365]} Her Guardian Spirit Beast, a giant frog with wheels, is a Transmuter that can synthesize any drug within its body and possesses a collaborative type ability that requires a "research partner".^{[ch. 375]}

==== Tyson Hui Guo Rou ====
Tyson Hui Guo Rou (タイソン=ホイコーロ, Taison Hoikōro) is the sixth prince of Kakin and Nasubi's only child with his fourth wife, Katrono (カットローン, Kattorōn).^{[ch. 349]} Izunavi is selected as her bodyguard.^{[ch. 350]} A stout and plump woman, she prefers handsome men as her bodyguards and encourages them to read her Book of Tyson, which reflects her ideals of world peace and which she treats as scripture.^{[ch. 366]} Her Guardian Spirit Beast, a giant heart with four wings and a single eye, is an Emitter with a diffusive levy type ability where it produces smaller Nen Beasts called Eye-wogs (目玉ジャクシ/目の狂い, Medama Jakushi/Me no Kurui) that attach themselves to whoever receives her book, collecting aura from them and bestowing happiness in return.^{[ch. 375]} The degree of happiness received depends on how thoroughly one has read the Book of Tyson with severe consequences to whoever breaks the one and only taboo of Tyson's teachings.^{[ch. 375]}

==== Luzurus Hui Guo Rou ====
Luzurus Hui Guo Rou (ルズールス=ホイコーロ, Ruzūrusu Hoikōro) is the seventh prince of Kakin and Nasubi's third child with Duazul.^{[ch. 349]} He made a failed attempt for some of his bodyguards to take part in the Hunter Exam before the ship's departure.^{[ch. 348]} Basho is selected as his bodyguard and the two bond over smoking drugs.^{[ch. 350, 366]} His centipede-like Guardian Spirit Beast is a Conjurer that applies pseudo-coercive manipulation in setting traps by materializing whatever the target desires as bait.^{[ch. 375]}

==== Salé-salé Hui Guo Rou ====
Salé-salé Hui Guo Rou (サレサレ=ホイコーロ, Saresare Hoikōro) is the eighth prince of Kakin and Nasubi's only child with his fifth wife Swinko-swinko (スィンコスィンコ).^{[ch. 349]} He seems to be a womanizer and a wild hedonist to the point of proudly disregarding the succession war and holding a party to his mother's dismay. He is the second Prince to die after his Guardian Spirit Beast is eaten by the Nen ability of one of Benjamin's men that infiltrated his detail, so that a second infiltrator could kill him.^{[ch. 382]} Salé-salé's Guardian Spirit Beast, resembling a floating ball with several faces, is a Manipulator whose ability is tied to his libido. It spews a gas which when inhaled increases one's goodwill towards Salé-salé.^{[ch. 374]} A target that has inhaled a certain amount of the gas becomes a carrier with a clone of Salé-salé's Guardian Spirit Beast above them, infecting others.^{[ch. 374]}

==== Halkenburg Hui Guo Rou ====
Halkenburg Hui Guo Rou (ハルケンブルグ=ホイコーロ, Harukenburugu Hoikōro) is the ninth prince of Kakin and officially Nasubi's fourth child with Duazul ^{[ch. 349]} but later revealed to be biologically Unma's third son. ^{[ch. 402]}. A prodigy student who entered university at age 15, he is considered the most gifted of the heirs and by many the most suited to become the next ruler. However, he openly criticizes the royal family.^{[ch. 349]} Unlike his siblings, Halkenburg has no intention on continuing with the succession battle and tells his father he will not participate.^{[ch. 361]} In his second confrontation with his father, he learns the harsh truth, that the only way for him to end the succession war is by winning. His Guardian Spirit Beast, a feathered ogre-like Enhancer that implants pinions to boost his followers' physical abilities, awaken his Nen ability to transmit the aura of a follower into another person to place them in a trance-like state until that follower is killed.^{[ch. 382]} Halkenburg's body is poisoned to death by Balsamilco Might, one of the subjects of Prince Benjamin, but manages to temporarily possess Balsamilco's body after his death as part of his plan to end the succession war. ^{[ch. 404]}

==== Kacho Hui Guo Rou ====
Kacho Hui Guo Rou (カチョウ=ホイコーロ, Kachō Hoikōro) is the tenth prince of Kakin and Nasubi's first daughter with his sixth wife, Seiko (セイコ).^{[ch. 349]} Melody is selected as her bodyguard.^{[ch. 350]} Appearing rude and selfish on the outside, this is actually an act to appear tough and to ensure that her bodyguards side with her twin sister Fugetsu if forced to choose between them.^{[ch. 377]} She cares about Fugetsu and convinces her that they should work together to win the succession game, enlisting Melody's help to orchestrate an escape plan.^{[ch. 359, 377]} This plan fails as Kacho is killed by a mysterious force preventing any princes from leaving. Her Guardian Spirit Beast awakens upon her death, assuming Kacho's form per its ability Without You (あなたなしで({{{2}}}), Anata Nashide), which would have also been triggered by the death of her sister, to protect Fugetsu until she dies.

==== Fugetsu Hui Guo Rou ====
Fugetsu Hui Guo Rou (フウゲツ=ホイコーロ, Fūgetsu Hoikōro) is the 11th prince of Kakin and Nasubi's second daughter with Seiko, making her Kacho's twin sister.^{[ch. 349]} Unlike her sister, she is shy and kind. Her Guardian Spirit Beast creates doors that act as portals allowing her to travel instantly between two points.^{[ch. 376]} She attempts to escape along with Kacho, but is forced to use her portal to retreat as a mysterious force prevents her from leaving while later joined by her twin's Guardian Spirit Beast.^{[ch. 383]}

==== Momoze Hui Guo Rou ====
Momoze Hui Guo Rou (モモゼ=ホイコーロ, Momoze Hoikōro) is the 12th prince of Kakin and Nasubi's first child with his seventh wife, Sevanti (セヴァンチ, Sevanchi).^{[ch. 349]} Hanzo is selected as her bodyguard.^{[ch. 350]} Her Guardian Spirit Beast is mouse-like and was one of the Beasts to attack Woble's bodyguards.^{[ch. 368]} After Sevanti orders some of Momoze's bodyguards to protect Marayam instead, including Hanzo, Momoze is strangled to death in her sleep by one of her remaining guards, making her the first prince to die in the succession war.^{[ch. 361, 368]} King Nasubi has her body composed and placed in a grave inside a mysterious room where 13 more empty graves are arranged in a circle.^{[ch. 371]}

==== Marayam Hui Guo Rou ====
Marayam Hui Guo Rou (マラヤーム=ホイコーロ, Marayāmu Hoikōro) is the 13th prince of Kakin and Nasubi's second child with Sevanti.^{[ch. 349]} Biscuit is selected as his bodyguard.^{[ch. 350]} Sevanti orders some of Momoze's bodyguards to protect Marayam instead, claiming he is scared and more important.^{[ch. 361]}

==== Woble Hui Guo Rou ====
Woble Hui Guo Rou (ワブル=ホイコーロ, Waburu Hoikōro) is the 14th prince of Kakin, Nasubi's youngest child and only child with his eighth wife, Oito (オイト).^{[ch. 349]} She is forced to participate in the succession game despite being a newborn baby. Oito hires Kurapika to protect her and her daughter during the succession game.^{[ch. 350]} Two hours in, all of their initial bodyguards are killed by Guardian Spirit Beasts except Kurapika and Bill (ビル, Biru), a Hunter hired by Pariston to search the Dark Continent with Beyond.^{[ch. 361]} Like the other princes, they are then given a royal armed guard by Benjamin, but are additionally given two more guards from Zhang Lei.^{[ch. 366]} Kurapika temporarily gives Oito the Nen ability Rear Window: Little Eye (裏窓(リトルアイ), Riau~Indō: Ritoru Ai) by using his Stealth Dolphin ability, which she uses to control a cockroach to learn the guards and Guardian Spirit Beast of prince Marayam and witness Momoze's death, before it is killed by Tserriednich's Spirit Beast.^{[ch. 367–369]} As a result, Oito's own ability to use Nen is awakened and she begins training to use it.^{[ch. 369, 370]}

=== Mafia ===
==== Xi-Yu ====
The Xi-Yu (シュウ=ウ一家, Shuu U ikka) mafia family is run by its boss Onior Longbao (オニオール=ロンポウ, Oniōro Ronpou), Nasubi Hui Guo Rou's illegitimate half-brother.^{[ch. 378]} Hinrigh Biganduffno (ヒンリギ=ビガンダフノ, Hinrigi Bigandafuno) is the underboss of the family.^{[ch. 378]} Based on level four of the Black Whale, their benefactor is Zhang Lei and they control human trafficking and goods distribution.^{[ch. 378]} The Xi-Yu are trying to find Hisoka before the Phantom Troupe, in order to prevent a large scale incident on board.

==== Heil-Ly ====
The Heil-Ly (エイ=イ一家, Ei I ikka) mafia family is run by its boss Morena Prudo (モレナ=プルード, Morena Purūdo), Nasubi Hui Guo Rou's illegitimate daughter with a mistress.^{[ch. 378]} Based on level three of the Black Whale, their benefactor is Tserriednich and they intermediate between the wealthy and the black market.^{[ch. 378]} Morena's Nen ability "Contagion": With Etude of Love (伝染: 恋のエチュードとともに/Densen: Koi no Echūdo to Tomoni) allows her, as number zero, to infect up to 22 other people through her saliva. These infected level up and increase their power by killing people; at level 20 they develop their own Nen ability, and at 100 they become a new number zero and can infect others to form their own community.^{[ch. 378]}

==== Cha-R ====
The Cha-R (シャ=ア一家, Sha A ikka) mafia family is run by its boss Brocco Li (ブロッコ=リー, Burokko Rī), Nasubi Hui Guo Rou's illegitimate half-brother.^{[ch. 378]} Ken'i Wang (オウ=ケンイ, Ō Ken'i) is the underboss of the family.^{[ch. 378]} Based on level five of the Black Whale, their benefactor is Luzurus and they control all commodities.^{[ch. 378]} The Cha-R are trying to find Hisoka before the Phantom Troupe, in order to prevent a large scale incident on board.

=== Princes' Staff ===
==== Longhi ====
Longhi is a Royal Guard for Fifth Prince Tubeppa, who sent her to attend Kurapika's Nen classes. During the stage where the class was being initiated, Longhi revealed that she is the daughter of Beyond Netero, having already been initiated into Nen at birth.^{[ch. 401]}

== Other characters ==
=== Mito ===
Voiced by: Akemi Okamura (1998 film), Akiko Kimura (1999 series), Keiko Han (2011 series) (Japanese); Rachael McCabe (2011 series) (English)

Mito (ミト) is the woman who raised Gon and does not want him to become a Hunter.^{[ch. 1]} Despite being Ging's cousin, Gon refers to her as his aunt and considers her his "real mom".^{[ch. 64, 65]} Although Mito never told Gon that Ging was a Hunter, he grew up believing both his parents died in a car accident, the boy learned about it from Kite three years prior to the series.^{[ch. 64]} She later reveals to him that ten years after Ging left Whale Island, he returned with Gon as an infant and asked their grandmother to take care of him for a while, but Mito felt him unfit to parent and gained custody of the boy.^{[ch. 65]} In the 1999 version of the anime and novelization, Mito is made into the sister of Gon's mother, making Ging her brother-in-law.

=== Wing ===
Voiced by: Masami Kikuchi (1999 series), Toshihiko Seki (2011 series) (Japanese); Ethan Murray (2011 series) (English)

Wing (ウイング, Uingu) is an assistant master of the Shingen-Ryu style of Kung fu whose pupil is Zushi. He meets Gon and Killua at the Heavens Arena and eventually teaches them Nen. Although he initially lies to them about Nen,^{[ch. 46]} he changes his mind when they advance to the 200th floor of Heavens Arena, realizing they could die or be badly injured by the other Nen users.^{[ch. 47, 48]} For the next several months he teaches them the basics of Nen, after which he announces they have passed the secret final requirement for being a Hunter.^{[ch. 60]} He does however somewhat fear their immense potential. Wing's teacher was Biscuit Krueger, who incidentally later becomes Gon and Killua's second teacher. Wing makes an appearance at Isaac Netero's funeral and at the first round of the 13th Hunter Chairman Election. He was last seen checking up on Gon at the hospital. His Nen type is Enhancement.^{[ch. 60]} Wing came in 11th and 15th place in the series' first two popularity polls.

=== Heavens Arena fighters ===
The Heavens Arena (ヘブンズアリーナ, Hebunzuarīna) is a large tower combat arena where combatants fight to ascend on higher floors for rewards.^{[ch. 45]} It is said to be the fourth tallest building the world, towering for over 991 meters (3,251 ft) and has a total of 251 floors.^{[ch. 44]}

==== Zushi ====
Voiced by: Umi Tenjin (1999 series), Yuka Terasaki (2011 series) (Japanese); Kira Buckland (2011 series) (English)

Zushi (ズシ) is a young boy who studies Shingen-Ryu Kung fu and Nen under the tutelage of Wing, whom Gon and Killua meet in the Heavens Arena.^{[ch. 45]} He is a formidable fighter and a prodigy in his own right, however, he is quickly surpassed by Gon and Killua. According to the results of his water divination, Zushi is a Manipulator.^{[ch. 60]} Zushi came in 21st place in the series' second popularity poll.

==== Sadaso ====
Voiced by: Yoshikazu Nagano (1999 series), Kazuma Takao (2011 series) (Japanese); Ethan Cole (1999 series), Ben Lepley (2011 series) (English)

Sadaso (サダソ) is a Heavens Arena fighter from the 200th floor whose notable characteristic is his missing left arm and a ruthless desire to pick upon fighters new to Nen. He and two other fighters were eagerly wanting to fight Gon and Killua.^{[ch. 48]} Zadaso then uses his Nen ability to take Zushi hostage into forcing Gon to fight them at the 29th of May, although Killua interferes, eventually giving them a free win. However, during the 10 minutes before he could fight, Killua appears behind him and threatened him for his fraud, causing him to flee and never return to Heaven's Arena.^{[ch. 57]} Sadaso is a Transmutation-type Nen user and his ability allows him to transmute an enormous left arm to restrain his targets. Like his two other lackeys, Sadaso's Nen ability is based on his missing body part.

==== Gido ====
Voiced by: Kohei Kowada (1999 series), Tōru Nara (2011 series) (Japanese); Corby Proctor (1999 series), Spike Spencer (2011 series) (English)

Gido (ギド) is a Heavens Arena fighter from the 200th floor whose notable characteristic is his missing lower body, thus he has a metal prosthetic to compensate for his loss.^{[ch. 49]} He, Sadaso, and Riehvelt are wanting to challenge both Gon and Killua.^{[ch. 48]} Although he initially won against Gon during their match on May 11,^{[ch. 51]} Gon would later win against him in a rematch.^{[ch. 59]} Gido is an Enhancement-type Nen user.^{[ch. 60]} Gido can use Combat Dance: Battle Waltz (コンバットダンス: バトルワルツ/Konbatto Dansu: Batoru Warutsu) to order his Nen-enhanced tops to surround his opponents.^{[ch. 50]} Tornado Top (トルネードトップ/Torunēdo Toppu) causes Gido to spin like a top while enveloped by aura. This ability is considered to be his most powerful one.^{[ch. 50]} Shotgun Top Lamentations: Shotgun Blues (ショットガンのトップの嘆き: ショットガン・ブルース/Shottogan no Toppu no Nageki: Shottogan Burūsu throws multiple spinning tops in rapid succession directly to his enemies, making it hard to avoid.^{[ch. 58]}

==== Riehlvelt ====
Voiced by: Yoshihiko Akaida (1999 series), Ichitarō Ai (2011 series) (Japanese); Scott Roberts (1999 series), Sean Chiplock (2011 series) (English)

Riehlvelt (リールベルト, Rīruberuto) is a Heavens Arena fighter from the 200th floor whose notable characteristic is his paralyzed limbs, thus he sits on a modified wheelchair.^{[ch. 49]} Riehvelt was eventually disqualified from Heaven's Arena after a total of four losses against both Gon and Killua.^{[ch. 59]} He uses two whips called the Two-Headed Snake-Twin Serpents (双頭の蛇双蛇/Sōtō no Hebi Sōja) which can emit 1,000,000 volts of electricity. Riehvelt's Nen ability is called Explosive Thrust: Aura Burst (爆発的な進力: オーラバースト/Bakuhatsu-tekina Suiryoku: Ōra Bāsuto) which he propels himself at accelerated speeds by using a burst of his aura.^{[ch. 59]}

==== Kastro ====
Voiced by: Yuuji Kishi (1999 series), Tokuyoshi Kawashima (2011 series) (Japanese); Kevin M. Connolly (2011 series) (English)

Kastro (カストロ, Kasutoro) is a prominent and talented fighter in the Heavens Arena. He hangs out on the 200th floor of the Heavens Arena with the intent on building enough wins to become a Floor Master. His only loss is to Hisoka, so he trains rigorously to improve his Nen. After accumulating nine out of the ten required wins to become a Floor Master, he challenges Hisoka to a rematch.^{[ch. 52]} While he appears to have the upper hand at first, Hisoka realizes that Kastro has been working in tandem with a doppelgänger created through his Nen.^{[ch. 53]} Hisoka then performs an illusion using Nen to throw off Kastro, which leaves an opening for Hisoka to kill him.^{[ch. 55]} Kastro's undoing is in the type of Nen ability that he has chosen. Although he was born as an Enhancer, Kastro's ability completely ignores his strengths and uses Conjuration and Manipulation. Furthermore, his conjured doppelgänger is also flawed in that although Kastro gets dirtied from blows dealt to him, it remains spotless in combat due to it being merely a reflection of what he sees of himself, thus making it easy to distinguish between the two.^{[ch. 54]}

=== Nostrade Family ===
The Nostrade Family is the mafia family that Kurapika joins in order to find information concerning his people's stolen Scarlet Eyes. It is headed by Light Nostrade (ライト=ノストラード, Raito Nosutorādo), and by using the fortunetelling ability of his daughter Neon, Light managed to greatly increase his position in the mafia community, to the point where even the Ten Dons seek his daughter's advice.^{[ch. 79]} Before entering the underground auction several bodyguards are hired to protect Neon, including Kurapika, by Dalzollene.^{[ch. 70]} After the Phantom Troupe attack on the auction, several of the bodyguards are killed, including Dalzollene, which allows Kurapika to become the lead bodyguard.^{[ch. 79]}

==== Neon Nostrade ====
Voiced by: Yuko Maekawa (1999 series), Kana Ueda (2011 series) (Japanese); Faye Mata (2011 series) (English)

Neon Nostrade (ネオン=ノストラード, Neon Nosutorādo) is the only daughter of the head of the Nostrade family, Light Nostrade. Using her Nen ability, Lovely Ghostwriter: Angelic Auto Writing (素敵なゴーストライター: 天使の自動書き込み/Sutekina Gōsutoraitā: Tenshi no Jidō Kakikomi), she predicts the future through quatrain fortune tellings which are always accurate,^{[ch. 71]} but slightly cryptic due to their use of abstract references to future events. Neon is spoiled; she receives everything she demands by threatening to cease the use of her ability for her father's benefit. Neon is also very involved with the occult and is an avid collector of rare human flesh, such as the Scarlet Eyes of the Kurta Clan. Neon cares very little about anything else other than her collection; even the death of her head bodyguard, Dalzollene, causes her no grief.^{[ch. 79]} However, when a family attendant is heartbroken, Neon offers to leave Yorknew City, despite not having obtained the auction items she desired.^{[ch. 121]} She loses her Nen ability when Chrollo steals it from her. It is later revealed that her ability disappeared from Chrollo's book, implying that she died.^{[ch. 377]} Neon came in 23rd place in the series' second popularity poll.

==== Dalzollene ====
Voiced by: Hiromi Sugino (1999 series), Takehito Koyasu (2011 series) (Japanese); Kirk Thornton (2011 series) (English)

Dalzollene (ダルツォルネ, Darutsorune) is a dedicated leader of Neon Nostrade's bodyguards and Kurapika's direct superior.^{[ch. 70]} He is killed by Phinks, as the Troupe infiltrates a Nostrade compound in order to rescue a captured Uvogin.^{[ch. 78]} Dalzollene is seen wielding a katana inscribed with runes. In the anime, he manages to pierce Uvogin by 5 millimeters with the katana.

==== Squala ====
Voiced by: Norihisa Mori (1999 series), Takuma Suzuki (2011 series) (Japanese); Ray Chase (2011 series) (English)

Squala (スクワラ, Sukuwara) is one of Neon Nostrade's bodyguards. During the job interview for new hires, he was one of the two moles planted alongside the applicants in order to test their strength.^{[ch. 68]} He is also in a romantic relationship with Eliza, one of Neon's female attendants.^{[ch. 109]} Squala is later beheaded by Nobunaga.^{[ch. 112]} His Nen ability gives him the capacity of manipulating dogs, being able to communicate with them through whistles and give them complex orders, such as guarding or spying.

==== Baise ====
Voiced by: Shiori Ohta (1999 series), Miki Nagasawa (2011 series) (Japanese); Carrie Keranen (2011 series) (English)

Baise (ヴェーゼ, Vēze) is one of Neon Nostrade's new bodyguards, hired along with Kurapika. She is one of the three bodyguards sent to buy what Neon wants in the Yorknew City underground auction, but everyone is consequentially murdered by the Phantom Troupe that night. She is killed by Shizuku during the massacre.^{[ch. 73]} A Manipulator, her Nen ability Instant Lover: 180-Minute Love Slave (インスタントラバー: 180分の恋奴隷/Insutanto Rabā: 180-Funkan no Ai no Dorei) gives her the ability to make anyone she kisses her slave for 180 minutes.^{[ch. 68]}

==== Shachmono Tocino ====
Voiced by: Masaki Ishikawa (1999 series), Takeharu Onishi (2011 series) (Japanese); Arlen Konopaki (1999 series), Derek Stephen Prince (2011 series) (English)

Shachmono Tocino (Shacchimōno Tochīno) is a senior member of Neon Nostrade's bodyguards and a Hunter. Tocino along with Squala are one of the moles planted alongside the applicants in order to test their strength.^{[ch. 68]} During the night in the Underground Auction, Tocino is one of the people killed by Franklin's Nen ability.^{[ch. 73]}

Shachmono Tocino is an Emission-type Nen user. His ability is called 11 Black Children: Eleven People Beneath the Edge (縁の下の力持ちの11人|イレブンブラックチルドレン|/En no Shita no 11-nin) which summons doll-like balloons. Each can be given an order and can be mistakens as humans, however a thorough analysis on their behavior can give away their identity.

=== Bobobo ===
Voiced by: Kenji Nomura (Greed Island OVA), Nobuaki Kanemitsu (2011 series) (Japanese); Chris Jai Alex (2011 series) (English)

Bobobo (ボポボ, Bopobo) is a death row convict known for committing multiple acts of rape, murder, and robbery.^{[ch. 161]} He is one of the pirates terrorizing Soufrabi as part of the Greed Island's in-game event. He is killed by Razor as a consequence for violating the taboo by hinting that the video game is part of the real world.^{[ch. 160]}

=== Gyro ===
Gyro (ジャイロ, Jairo) is the king and founder of the Neo-Green Life Autonomous Region (NGL), whose goal is to spread evil throughout the world. In his childhood, Gyro was abused by his alcoholic father, despite considering him as a god. After the cruel revelation that his father never cared nor loved him, Gyro killed his own father and stole his money. In his later life, he developed the D_{2} drug and became the kingpin of NGL.^{[ch. 204]}

During the invasion of the Chimera Ants in the NGL, Gyro was killed along with his friend, Zaiqahal. Despite being reborn as a Chimera Ant, Gyro's willpower and pride allowed him to retain his human memories and left the Queen's hive in order to reestablish his own kingdom.^{[ch. 204]} Welfin believes that Gyro is currently situated in Meteor City with he, Hina, and Bizeff deciding to head there to find him.^{[ch. 315]}

=== Ming Jol-ik ===
Voiced by: Hiromasa Taguchi (Japanese); Doug Erholtz (English)

Ming Jol-ik (マサドルデイーゴ, Masadoru Deīgo) is the former dictator who rules the Republic of East Gorteau. A double of him secretly succeeded his place.^{[ch. 315]} During the Chimera Ant crisis, Meruem kills the double and Neferpitou uses their Nen ability to manipulate the double's corpse to announce a national rally for the "Selection."^{[ch. 217,223]}

His name is an anagram for Kim Jong-il.

=== Komugi ===
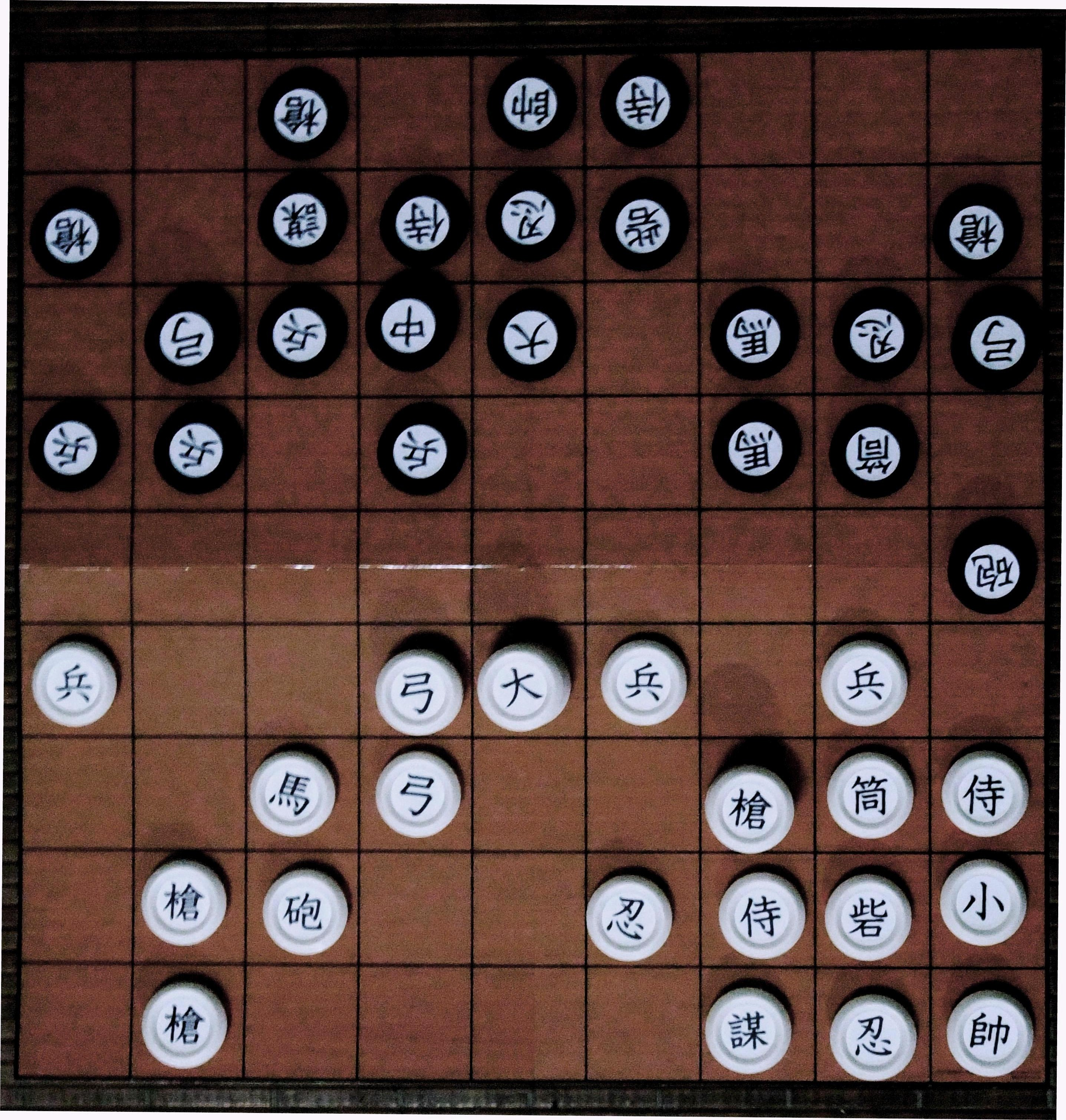
A Gungi game.

Voiced by: Aya Endō (Japanese); Ryan Bartley (English)

Komugi (コムギ) is a blind girl from the Republic of East Gorteau and reigning world champion of Gungi (軍儀), a board game created in the country.^{[ch. 244]} When Meruem took over East Gorteau he challenged numerous expert game players and beat them at their specialties, however, Komugi is the only one he is unable to beat. Komugi ends up influencing Meruem into becoming more human-like while her exposure to him awakens her ability to use Nen, improving her Gungi skills.^{[ch. 257]} During the raid on the palace of East Gorteau, Komugi is severely injured as a result of Zeno's ability and is healed by Pitou. After Meruem is fatally poisoned from Netero's bomb, she stays beside him during his final moments and dies herself minutes later from exposure to him.^{[ch. 318]} Nearby their hands, a white Gungi piece with "General" and a black Gungi piece with "Shinobi" can be seen, referring to the relationship between Komugi and Meruem respectively.

=== Magical Beasts ===
These Magical Beasts are mainly Chimera Ants that survived the extermination, and were then classified as magical beasts.^{[ch. 316]}

==== Colt ====
Voiced by: Hirofumi Nojima, Chika Anzai (Kurt), (Japanese); Zach Aguilar, Allegra Clark (Kurt) (English)

Colt (コルト, Koruto) is an eagle-themed Chimera Ant squadron leader with wings, talons, and a beak. He is among the first Chimera Ants to be born by the Queen following her change to an all-human diet, later revealed to be a reincarnation of her first human victim Kurt (クルト, Kuruto) who died attempting to protect his younger sister Reina (レイナ) from Chimera Ants. Colt projects a loyal and formal attitude, being one of the few squad leaders who always gives all the humans they kill to the Queen as food. When the Queen is grievously injured as a result of Meruem's birth, Colt surrenders to the Hunters in order to secure medical attention for her and even offers his own organs to save her life.^{[ch. 213, 215]} Soon after the Queen's death, Colt finds another offspring on her corpse. He vows to protect her and a tearful Morel promises to protect Colt and the infant from harm on the condition that they never eat humans.^{[ch. 215]} After the battle, it is revealed that she is Kite reborn as a female Chimera Ant.^{[ch. 316]}

==== Meleoron ====
Voiced by: Nobuo Tobita (Japanese); Bill Rogers (English)

Meleoron (メレオロン, Mereoron) is a chameleon-themed Chimera Ant squadron leader and an eccentric pacifist who dislikes fighting or killing, admitting that his fighting strength is on par with a lowly soldier ant.^{[ch. 243]} Leaving the colony following the death of Peggy by Meruem, Meleron gradually regained the memories of his past life as a human named Jail (ジェイル, Jeiru) and that Peggy was originally his foster father.^{[ch. 242]} This motivates him to swear revenge on the King and he teams up with Gon, whom he deems an ideal ally for this purpose. Meleoron's Nen ability God's Alibi: Perfect Plan (神のアリバイ(パーフェクトプラン), Kami no Aribai: Pāfekuto Puran) renders himself invisible and undetectable by smell, sound or even touch as long as he holds his breath.^{[ch. 242]} His other ability, God's Accomplice (神の共犯者, Kami no Kyōhan-sha) allows him to use Perfect Plan on anyone he is touching.^{[ch. 243]}

==== Ikalgo ====
Voiced by: Kenyuu Horiuchi (Japanese); Greg Chun (English)

Ikalgo (イカルゴ, Ikarugo), is an octopus-themed Chimera Ant that wishes he was born as a squid. Although he attacked Killua first, Killua stops him from committing suicide as he could imagine them being friends, and in return Ikalgo later saves the boy's life.^{[ch. 238, 241]} Ikalgo can turn two of his tentacles into an air gun, can manipulate corpses with his Nen ability Forbidden Games: Living Dead Dolls (禁じられたゲーム(リビングデッドドールズ), Kinji Rareta Gēmu: Ribingu Deddo Dōruzu), and can use the corpse's Nen abilities as well. ^{[ch. 269, 282]} When manipulating a corpse he can use Tick Tock: Fleadom Fire (チィックトック/チクタク(フリーダムファイア), Tikku Tokku/Chikutaku: Furīdamu Faia) to fire special fleas from his gun.^{[ch. 237, 238]} Having actually become friends, Ikalgo allies with Killua and the Hunters and is tasked with finding and escaping with Palm during the assault on the palace.^{[ch. 255, 273]}

==== Welfin ====
Voiced by: Daiki Nakamura (Japanese); Xander Mobus (English)

Welfin (ウェルフィン, Werufin) is a Chimera Ant squadron leader resembling a humanoid wolf and possessing a powerful sense of smell.^{[ch. 261]} In his previous life, Welfin was a childhood friend of NGL leader Gyro named Zaiqahal (ザイカハル, Zaiqaharu), who was captured while defending Gyro's base and fed to the Queen.^{[ch. 296, 309]} Welfin became a follower of Meruem with ulterior motives in improving his own status. His Nen ability is Egg on Your Face: Missile Man (エッグ・オン・ユア・フェイス: ミサイルマン/Eggu on Yua Feisu: Misairu Man) which conjures a back-mounted organism armed with missiles that implant centipedes that grow from feeding on the victim's defiance.^{[ch. 296]} While Welfin uses it for negotiation purposes, the missiles attacking if his target lies when asked a question or defies an order, the Hatsu can be deactivated when he is in a state of fear.^{[ch. 276]} Following his encounter with Ikalgo, Welfin begin to question himself. He later played a role in restoring Meruem's memory by uttering Komugi's name in fear for his life, the immense dread Welfin experienced causing him to age as a result.^{[ch. 313]} After the battle, Welfin joins Hina and Bizef in seeking out Gyro in Meteor City.^{[ch. 315]}

==== Bloster ====
Voiced by: Yūya Murakami (Japanese); Chris Cason (ep 78–102), Joe Zieja (ep 103) (English)

Bloster (ブロヴーダ, Burovūda) is a Chimera Ant squadron leader resembling a humanoid lobster.^{[ch. 188]} Bloster believes he used to be a former resident of NGL much like Gyro and Welfin. At the end of the Chimera Ant crisis, Bloster decided to stay with a Chimera Ant peon named Shidore (シドレ) in a village, in which an inhabitant of the village named Haruna (ハルナ) recognizes her as Reina (レイナ), Haruna's daughter despite being a Chimera Ant.^{[ch. 315]} Bloster is an Emission-type Nen user, his Nen ability allows him to emit powerful blasts from his pincers.^{[ch. 279]}

==== Koala ====
Voiced by: Kenyuu Horiuchi (Japanese); Kaiji Tang (English)

Koala (コアラ, Koara) is a koala-themed Chimera Ant who was a soldier in Meleoron's squad.^{[ch. 189]} In his former human life, Koala was a professional hitman, a profession that he continued after being reborn as a Chimera Ant. He typically kills his victims by shooting them in the head.^{[ch. 337]} In the aftermath of Meruem's death, he comes into contact with Kite, now a Chimera Ant as well. Koala explains how Kite looks exactly like a red-haired girl that he killed out of mercy. Feeling guilt for his actions, Kite demand that he live out the rest of his life with her as penance, which he accepts.^{[ch. 337]}

=== Beyond Netero ===
Beyond Netero (ビヨンド=ネテロ, Biyondo Netero) is Isaac Netero's son who took part in an expedition to the Dark Continents decades earlier, but after it ended in failure, his father forbade him from making another attempt as long as he lived.^{[ch. 344, 346]} After Isaac's death, Beyond reveals himself to the public and enlists the support of King Hui Guo Rou of Kakin to assemble another expedition,^{[ch. 340]} facing fierce opposition from the world's five most powerful nations (known as the V5) that deem the Dark Continent a forsaken place. However, he makes a deal with the V5 and the Hunter Association, agreeing to continue the expedition under constant vigilance from the Zodiacs, with any discovery belonging to them.^{[ch. 345]} For the expedition, Beyond hired a group of Temp Hunters through Pariston, which Ging becomes the second-in-command of in name only.^{[ch. 345]}
