= Umi Tenjin =

Japanese voice actress

Umi Tenjin (天神 有海, Tenjin Umi, born March 25) is a Japanese voice actress from Tochigi Prefecture, Japan.

== Voice roles ==
=== Anime ===
==== TV ====
1997

- Cojicoji (Harehare)
- The Kindaichi Case Files (Chihiro Aoyama) (ep 3)

1998

- Fushigi Mahou Fun Fun Pharmacy (Pinchy)
- Kocchi Muite! Miiko (Miiko Yamada)

1999

- Ojamajo Doremi series (Misaki Shibayama, various others)
- Digimon Adventure (Koushiro Izumi) aka izzy
- Magic User's Club (Michiko Mikote, Rie)
- Hunter × Hunter (Ponzu, Zushi, Kortopi)

2000

- Digimon Adventure 02 (Koushiro Izumi)

2002

- Digimon Frontier (Pandamon)
- Full Moon o Sagashite (Sora)

2004

- Battle B-Daman (Jinbee)

2005

- Mahoraba Heartful Days (Asami Kurosaki)

2006

- Digimon Savers (Pandamon)

2010

- Digimon Xros Wars (Pandamon)

==== OVA ====
2002

- Hunter × Hunter OVA (Kortopi)

==== Movie ====
2000

- Digimon Adventure (Koushiro Izumi)

2001

- Digimon Adventure 02 (Koushiro Izumi)

=== Video games ===
- Summon Night (Akane)
- Digimon World (Main Character)
