= Marcy Lannan =

Canadian voice actress

Marcy Lannan is a Canadian voice actress who works for Blue Water Studios in Calgary, Alberta and is part of the Spectacle Blue Studios theatre company.

== Background ==
In 2005, Marcy Lannan graduated from the University of Calgary's Fine arts program with a major in Drama and has worked with Quest Theatre, The Shakespeare Company, Maple Salsa, Theatre Encounter and The Downstage Theatre Society. Following completion of her acting training at the university, she auditioned for the 2004 anime series My-HiME and was cast as Nao Yuuki.

Outside of voiceover work, she is involved in theatre and coaches aspiring actors. She is also an aerialist and trapeze artist.

== Filmography ==
=== Anime ===
- Full Moon o Sagashite - Tomoe Maejima, Nurse, Obnoxious Girl
- Hunter x Hunter (1999 series) - Machi
- My-HiME - Nao Yuuki, Additional voices
- My-Otome - Juliet Nao Zhang
- My-Otome Zwei - Juliet Nao Zhang
- Futari wa Pretty Cure -Chiaki Yabe/Sienna
- Strawberry Marshmallow - Co-Worker

=== Theatre ===
- Lhasa: Land of the Gods
- Macbeth - Witch
- The End Of The World As We Know It
