= List of Hunter × Hunter (2011 TV series) episodes =

Key visual for the series

Hunter × Hunter is a Japanese anime television series based on Yoshihiro Togashi's manga series Hunter × Hunter, aired from 2011 to 2014. The story begins with a young boy named Gon Freecss, who one day discovers that the father who he thought was dead is, in fact, alive and well. He learns that his father, Ging, is a legendary "Hunter", an individual who has proven themselves an elite member of humanity. Despite the fact that Ging left his son with his relatives in order to pursue his own dreams, Gon becomes determined to follow in his father's footsteps, pass the rigorous "Hunter Examination", and eventually find his father to become a Hunter in his own right.

This second anime television series adaptation of Hunter × Hunter was announced on July 24, 2011. It is a complete reboot starting from the beginning of the original manga, with no connection to the first anime television series from 1999. Produced by Nippon Television, VAP, Shueisha, and Madhouse, the series is directed by Hiroshi Kōjina, with Atsushi Maekawa and Tsutomu Kamishiro handling series composition, Takahiro Yoshimatsu designing the characters and Yoshihisa Hirano composing the music. Instead of having the old cast reprise their roles for the new adaptation, the series features an entirely new cast to voice the characters. The new series premiered airing weekly on Nippon Television and the nationwide Nippon News Network from October 2, 2011. The series started to be collected in both DVD and Blu-ray format on January 25, 2012. Viz Media has licensed the anime for a DVD/Blu-ray release in North America with an English dub. On television, the series began airing on Adult Swim's Toonami programming block on April 17, 2016, and ended on June 23, 2019.

== Series overview ==
Arc	Episodes	Originally released	
Arc	Episodes	First released	Last released
Hunter Exam	26	October 2, 2011	April 8, 2012
Heavens Arena	12	April 15, 2012	July 8, 2012
Phantom Troupe (Note: Also referred to as the Yorknew City arc.)	20	July 15, 2012	December 9, 2012
Greed Island	17	December 16, 2012	April 14, 2013
Chimera Ant	61	April 21, 2013	July 2, 2014
Election (Note: Also referred to as the 13th Hunter Chairman Election arc.)	12	July 9, 2014	September 24, 2014

== Episodes ==
=== Hunter Exam arc (2011–12) ===
No. overall	No. in arc	Title	Directed by	Written by	Original release date	English air date
1	1	"Departure × and × Friends"; Transliteration: "Tabidachi to Nakama-tachi" (Japanese: タビダチ×ト×ナカマタチ)	Tomoya Takahashi; Kenichi Kawamura	Atsushi Maekawa	October 2, 2011	April 17, 2016
The story begins with a young boy named Gon who aspires to be just like his father Ging. Ging had left his son in the care of Mito, Gon's aunt, and has not been back since. In order to prove his ability to take the exam, Gon catches the local monster fish, "Lord of the Lake". Although Mito is reluctant to let Gon leave his home, she relents after seeing his determination to understand why his father left and what his interest of becoming a Hunter was. After saying goodbye to Mito and the townspeople, Gon boards a ship with participants from other lands and sets sail for the exam venue. After Gon predicts a violent storm approaching, the captain manages to steer the ship through the storm. He is later revealed to be one of the Hunter examiners, and he singles out Gon, Kurapika (who wishes to become a Hunter in order to hunt down the Phantom Troupe, a band of money driven ideologists, who massacred his clan in search of the red eyes possessed by his lineage), and Leorio (who claims to want to be a Hunter just for the money, but in reality is good at heart). Kurapika and Leorio have an argument, stepping out onto the deck to fight during the storm, but are interrupted when Gon goes to save a crew member who fell out of the ship. Gon, Kurapika and Leorio help save the crew member, earning the captain's approval, so he sends the three to the port closest to the exam site.
2	2	"Test × of × Tests"; Transliteration: "Shiken no Shiken" (Japanese: シケン×ノ×シケン)	Yukiyo Teramoto	Fumiyo Sakai	October 9, 2011	April 24, 2016
Gon, Kurapika and Leorio arrive at Dolle Harbor and are given instructions by the captain to head for the cedar tree on the hilltop behind the city. Moving through a small town, their path is blocked by a group of people, where an old woman will not let them pass until they have answered a quiz question. Incorrect answers, refusal to answer, or attempts to head back will result in failure of the exam. A scheming participant who followed the trio from the harbor answers a question and is allowed to pass. The old woman then poses the question to the three, asking which of their loved ones they would rescue first (implying the other would not survive): son or daughter. When Leorio complains that there is no right answer, Kurapika understands that it's a trick question and manages to stop Leorio from attacking the old woman. When the time is up and no answer is given, they pass, as the right answer was silence. The old woman shows Gon and the others to the correct path to the cedar tree. Upon reaching the tree, they find that the Navigators who live there are under attack by a shapeshifting creature, called a Kiriko. While Leorio tends to the wounded man, Gon and Kurapika go after the creature, only to discover that there are more than one of them. Impressed they were able to figure it out, the creatures revealed themselves to be the Navigators and fly them to the exam venue.
3	3	"Rivals × for × Survival"; Transliteration: "Raibaru ga Sabaibaru" (Japanese: ライバル×ガ×サバイバル)	Hong Hun-pyo	Mitsutaka Hirota	October 16, 2011	May 1, 2016
With the navigators' help, Gon, Kurapika and Leorio arrive at Zaban City, the venue of the exam. The Navigator leads them to a small restaurant, which is actually a front for the Hunter exam venue. Gon's group is led to a back room, where an elevator takes them one hundred floors underground. Below, they meet the rest of the Hunter exam participants and are given their numbers. Tonpa, a regular participant who claims to have tried and failed 35 times in the exam, secretly goes about trying to fail all the rookie examinees by giving them drinks mixed with laxatives. However, he fails to convince any of them to take the drinks, including Gon's group. Hisoka, a magician who attempted to kill an examiner in his previous attempt at the exam, is introduced. After accounting for the number of participants, an examiner by the name of Satotz tells the participants to follow him in the first phase of the exam, without telling them their destination or how far they are going to travel.
4	4	"Hope × and × Ambition"; Transliteration: "Kibō to Yabō" (Japanese: キボウ×ト×ヤボウ)	Kenichi Takeshita	Atsushi Maekawa	October 23, 2011	May 8, 2016
During the first phase, a number of participants drop out from fatigue after running for at least forty kilometers. Leorio almost gives up until he is encouraged by Gon, who waited for him. Killua, another rookie examinee, is introduced and he is curious about Gon when he discovers that they are the same age. Kurapika and Leorio run together and talk about their reasons for becoming Hunters. Kurapika wants to kill the Phantom Troupe, the group who massacred his clan for their precious scarlet eyes, which manifest when the Kurta experience intense emotion. Leorio aims to be a Hunter for money, but it is for altruistic reasons, as his childhood friend died of an illness because they did not have the funds to save him. Leorio wishes to be a doctor so he can give his patients free treatment. Finally, the participants reach the end of the tunnel they were running in and surface in the Numere Wetlands, also known as Swindlers' Swamp. Satotz warns them that the creatures often use devious tactics to lure and eat their prey in the wetlands, and that falling for their tricks equals death. Suddenly, a wounded man appears, claiming to be their original examiner and convincing everyone that Satotz was a man-faced ape masquerading as their examiner to fool them. Hisoka simultaneously throws his deadly playing cards at both the man and Satotz. The cards kill the man while Satotz catches the cards, proving that Satotz was the real examiner because examiners were supposed to be well-trained Hunters who are able to avoid such simple attacks. Hisoka is warned not to attack Satotz again, otherwise he will be disqualified. Satotz tells the participants to follow him into the swamp, and if any of them loses sight of him, they will never reach the second venue.
5	5	"Hisoka × is × Sneaky"; Transliteration: "Hisoka wa Hisoka" (Japanese: ヒソカ×ハ×ヒソカ)	Tomoya Tanaka	Fumiyo Sakai	October 30, 2011	May 15, 2016
While following Satotz, a fog covers the swamp and most of the contestants are either rendered unconscious or killed by the traps and ferocious beasts. Gon and Killua are separated from Leorio and Kurapika, and both parties are attacked by monsters. Leorio and Kurapika encounter Hisoka, who is surrounded by a group of candidates who feel that he is a threat they need to kill. Leorio and Kurapika are shocked to watch the magician easily take the group down. Hisoka then turns to Leorio and Kurapika next, but upon realizing that they are no match for him, Leorio and Kurapika run off in different directions to stop Hisoka from following. Leorio, however, returns, unable to run away from a fight. As expected, Leorio is beaten badly and knocked out by Hisoka. Gon, who got separated from Killua, arrives and hits Hisoka in the face with his fishing rod before he could kill Leorio. After the initial hit, Gon nearly gets strangled by Hisoka, but, after concluding that they have passed his "test" where he roleplayed as an examiner, Hisoka lets them go. He carries an unconscious Leorio off to the second venue, and it is shown that Hisoka is collaborating with an unknown candidate. Gon leaves by himself and finds Kurapika, who had returned and witnessed the entire scene, and they both head for the site of Phase Two of the exam. Kurapika analyzes Hisoka's behavior, believing that the magician has his own standards of judging whether the person he meets is worthy of fighting against or killing. Gon confesses to Kurapika that he actually feels afraid of his encounter with Hisoka.
6	6	"A × Surprising × Challenge"; Transliteration: "Igai na Kadai" (Japanese: イガイ×ナ×カダイ)	Masaki Matsumura	Mitsutaka Hirota	November 6, 2011	May 22, 2016
Gon and Kurapika reunite with Leorio and Killua at the Phase Two site. Satotz leads what remains of the candidates to meet the second phase examiners, Menchi and Buhara. The examiners declare the next phase is to test their cooking skills, much to the candidates' disbelief. The test requires pork, so the candidates are sent to find pigs in the forest. However, the pigs living inside the forest are carnivorous and tear through the candidates. Thanks to Gon, they discover the pigs' weakness and manage to each get one for their cooking. Upon tasting the candidates' food (wherein majority of the examinees simply roasted their pigs over a spit), Buhara gives a pass but Menchi fails all of them. Knowing the candidates will riot, Satotz informs Chairman Netero of the Hunter Selection Committee to make an appearance. Netero arrives to correct Menchi's habit of getting biased whenever it's related to cooking. Netero then allows Menchi to stay on as examiner, only if she participates in the event as well. Menchi gives the candidates a retest: boil eggs laid by spider eagles on Mt. Split-in-Half. The candidates ride on Netero's airship to the mountain, where they have to jump down into a potentially fatal ravine to get the eggs. Having seen and learned how Menchi gets her egg, Gon leads some of the other candidates into successfully getting their own. Some candidates are killed while rashly trying to get their eggs, while others refuse to take the leap. Out of the 50 candidates who survive to reach Phase Two, 42 candidates now remain.
7	7	"Showdown × on × the Airship"; Transliteration: "Hikōsen no Kessen" (Japanese: ヒコウセン×ノ×ケッセン)	Chie Yamashiro	Atsushi Maekawa	November 13, 2011	June 5, 2016 (Note: On the broadcast night of May 28–29, 2016, Adult Swim hosted a Samurai Champloo Memorial Day marathon where they played episodes 15–21.)
Upon traveling to the Phase Three site, the 42 remaining contestants travel on Chairman Netero's airship. All the candidates are told by Beans, Netero's secretary, to get some food and rest to prepare for the Third Phase the next morning. Tonpa tries to sabotage the rookies again by trying to keep Kurapika and Leorio awake for the whole night, but is exasperated to find that neither of them fall for his tricks. Gon and Killua explore the airship, and Killua tells Gon that he is actually from a family of assassins. He wished to go out on his own, not wanting his whole life planned out for him, which his family did not take lightly. Netero then arrives and tests both boys' instincts and asks how they felt about the difficulty of the exam. Netero invites both of them to participate in a game, which is simply taking a basketball from his hand. Gon and Killua find it too hard to pass up, but discovers that with Netero's skills, they are unable to grab the ball. Hours pass, and eventually Killua gives up, realizing that they will never be able to take the ball from Netero because Netero has not been employing any strength or energy from his right hand or left leg. Killua retires, but then takes his frustration out on two candidates who harass him by killing them. Gon continues the game until the wee hours of the morning, trying to grab the ball, and then headbutts Netero. The old man realizes that Gon will crack his skull if he continues with his headbutt, so he uses his right hand to push Gon away from him. Gon then tells Neteros then he has finally managed to get him to use his right hand once, which Gon counts as a great achievement. Gon passes out happily from exhaustion, and Netero calls the pilot of the airship to fly the ship a little slower so Gon could get more rest.
8	8	"Decision × By × Majority?"; Transliteration: "Kaiketsu wa Tasūketsu?" (Japanese: カイケツ×ハ×タスウケツ?)	Yukiyo Teramoto	Fumiyo Sakai	November 20, 2011	June 12, 2016
The airship reaches the Phase Three site, which is a tall featureless pillar built on an equally high platform. It's called the Trick Tower. The candidates are told that to pass Phase 3, they have to climb down from the top to the base of the tower within 72 hours. An experienced rock climber candidate tries to climb down the side but is eaten by some flying monsters. Later, Kurapika finds that more than half of the candidates have gone missing from the top platform. Gon and Killua then tell Kurapika and Leorio that they have discovered hidden trap doors that flip and go inside the tower. However, the catch is that there are many hidden doors and each one can be only used once by one person, which means they have to split up. Gon, Killua, Kurapika and Leorio try out different doors, saying goodbye, only to realize that they all end up in the same room. Gon's group is given special wristwatches, and Lippo, the Phase 3 examiner, explains that the wristwatches can be used to vote for which paths to take through the Tower. They will need to cooperate in order to pass this phase. However, there are 5 watches and they cannot proceed without a fifth member. Tonpa eventually falls through the trap door, joining in as the fifth member, and the exam proceeds. By following majority rule, the group eventually reaches an arena, where they have to face prisoners hired by Lippo to become combatants. Lippo explains that to pass, all they have to do is win three rounds. But the prisoners are given reduced sentences by one year for every hour they manage to keep the candidates here. Tonpa volunteers to go first, pitting himself against a combatant named Bendot in a death match. Tonpa immediately gives up, and Leorio accuses him of sabotaging candidates, which he admits to doing every year. Kurapika manages to stop Leorio, saying that this is part of their plan to make them fight each other and waste time. Gon decides to go for the second match, and is up against Sedokan, a jailed serial bomber.
9	9	"Beware × of × Prisoners"; Transliteration: "Shūjin ni Goyōjin" (Japanese: シュウジン×ニ×ゴヨウジン)	Woo Seung-wook	Atsushi Maekawa	November 27, 2011	June 19, 2016
Gon wins his fight with Sedokan. Kurapika agrees to fight next. Kurapika's opponent, Majitani, exposes a spider tattoo - a trademark of Phantom Troupe members. Kurapika cannot control his rage, showing his clan's special ability, and defeats Majitani. Leorio agrees to fight next.
10	10	"Trick × to × the Trick"; Transliteration: "Hikkake no Kikkake" (Japanese: ヒッカケ×ノ×キッカケ)	Tetsuo Yajima	Mitsutaka Hirota	December 4, 2011	June 26, 2016
Leroute claims that Majitani is only unconscious, thus Kurapika's match has not been settled. Leorio, and even Killua cannot persuade Kurapika to finish the fight for the latter refuses to fight a person who has lost the will to fight. Frustrated, Leorio decides to use the majority rule as a way out of the difficulty but no one supports him. Elsewhere, Hisoka is met by Togari, a former examiner whom Hisoka attacked and is now wanting revenge. Togari attacks with four crescent blades, only to be finished with one sweeping attack. Hisoka then becomes the first applicant to pass this phase. Meanwhile, the team suspects Majitani's real condition. Leroute challenges Leorio to have a betting game instead. Leorio agrees and bets ten hours that Majitani is alive, which he wins. Next, he bets twenty hours on Majitani feigning unconsciousness. To confirm, he brings Majitani to the edge of the platform and threatens to drop him. Seeing that, Leroute changes her bet to forty hours on Majitani being conscious. When he is about to be dropped by Leorio, Majitani moves and admits defeat, putting the score at 2 - 1 in favor of Leorio's team. However, they only have 20 hours left to wager.
11	11	"Trouble × With × the Gamble"; Transliteration: "Gyanburu de Toraburu" (Japanese: ギャンブル×デ×トラブル)	Kim Min-sun	Fumiyo Sakai	December 11, 2011	July 10, 2016 (Note: On the broadcast night of July 2–3, 2016, Adult Swim hosted a Hunter × Hunter marathon where they played the first seven episodes.)
Leorio is still betting with Leroute, a woman who plays mind tricks. He ends up losing after playing rock-paper-scissors and uses up all the team's hours. Killua goes next, facing off against an infamous serial killer who has murdered countless people with his bare hands. Killua earns a swift victory by instantly tearing his opponent's heart out, terrifying everyone but Gon, who already knew of his assassin history. With that the team has 3 victories and moves on to the next challenge.
12	12	"Last Test × of × Resolve"; Transliteration: "Saigo no Kakugo" (Japanese: サイゴ×ノ×カクゴ)	Tomoya Tanaka	Yasushi Hirano	December 18, 2011	July 17, 2016
The team waits in a room for 50 hours, and then face a predicament right before the end. The group is challenged, having to choose between a short and easy route, which only three can enter, or a long and hard path, which all members of the group can enter. Gon comes up with the idea to choose the long route, and axe the wall dividing them between the short path, and all five of them make it down the base of the tower in time.
13	13	"Letter × From × Gon"; Transliteration: "Gon yori no Tayori" (Japanese: ゴンヨリ×ノ×タヨリ)	Hiroyasu Aoki	Atsushi Maekawa	December 25, 2011	July 24, 2016
A letter from Gon arrives at Whale Island for Aunt Mito. A recap of episodes 1 to 12.
14	14	"Hit × the × Target"; Transliteration: "Tāgetto ni Hitto" (Japanese: ターゲット×ニ×ヒット)	Chie Yamashiro	Atsushi Maekawa	January 8, 2012	July 31, 2016
The applicants head to Zevil Island for the fourth phase of the exam. Each person draws a number which corresponds to the ID number of their target. The ID tag of their target is worth 3 points, their own ID tag is worth 3 points, and all other ID tags are worth 1 point. Each applicant must collect 6 points in order to pass this phase of the exam. Gon's target turns out to be Hisoka, much to his dismay.
15	15	"Scramble × of × Deception"; Transliteration: "Damashiai no Toriai" (Japanese: ダマシアイ×ノ×トリアイ)	Naomi Nakayama	Mitsutaka Hirota	January 15, 2012	August 7, 2016
Gon is relying on Bloodcrazy Butterflies to find his target, Hisoka, before waiting for the perfect time to use his skill with the fishing rod to snatch Hisoka's tag. Meanwhile, Leorio runs into Tonpa, who claims he is not his target and gives Leorio information about his target, Ponzu, who specializes in the use of traps and poison. However, while Leorio is distracted, Tonpa's partner steals Leorio's tag. Kurapika then arrives and knocks out both Tonpa and his partner, revealing Tonpa was his target. Now that Kurapika and Leorio know that neither is the other's target, they decide to form an alliance.
16	16	"Defeat × and × Disgrace"; Transliteration: "Haiboku to Kutsujoku" (Japanese: ハイボク×ト×クツジョク)	Yukiyo Teramoto	Shōji Yonemura	January 22, 2012	August 14, 2016
Kurapika and Leorio are being stalked by Hisoka, but they manage to negotiate their way out of a fight by giving him Tonpa's partner's badge. However, the encounter leaves Hisoka aroused, so he leaves in search of a new target. Gon is able to use his fishing rod to snatch Hisoka's tag right when Hisoka attacks his target. However, as Gon tries to escape, he is attacked and temporarily paralyzed by another applicant who takes his tag. Shortly after, Hisoka, impressed with Gon's patience and skill, kills the applicant who attacked Gon and returns his badge. Though Gon is reluctant to accept Hisoka's charity, he is ultimately forced to and Hisoka expresses his desire to meet Gon in the next stage of the exam.
17	17	"Trap × In × the Hole"; Transliteration: "Ana de Wana" (Japanese: アナ×デ×ワナ)	Woo Seung-wook	Shōji Yonemura	January 29, 2012	August 21, 2016
Killua grows tired of having Imori shadowing him so he challenges Imori, along with Amori and Umori to a fight and quickly dispatches him. Meanwhile, Gon has joined up with Leorio and Kurapika. The three of them devise a plan for taking Ponzu's tag and track her down to a suspicious-looking cave. That is when Leorio insists on heading in alone.
18	18	"Big × Time × Interview"; Transliteration: "Taisetsu na Mensetsu" (Japanese: タイセツ×ナ×メンセツ)	Masaki Matsumura	Mitsutaka Hirota	February 5, 2012	August 28, 2016
Gon and his friends have been trapped inside a cave by poisonous snakes. Bourbon, the person responsible for the trap, is already dead, and nobody knows how to disarm the trap. Meanwhile, Leorio, who was bitten by the snakes, is growing weak. Gon manages to get them out of the sticky situation and through to the final phase of the exam. But first, Netero wants an interview with each of the remaining applicants. The Fourth Phase has ended and nine applicants will go on through the Final Phase. The chairman interviews each of them, after which Gon and Kurapika chat and thank each other.
19	19	"Can't Win × But × Can't Lose"; Transliteration: "Katenai ga Makenai" (Japanese: カテナイ×ガ×マケナイ)	Kim Min-sun	Shōji Yonemura	February 12, 2012	September 11, 2016 (Note: On the broadcast night of September 3–4, 2016, Adult Swim hosted a One-Punch Man Labor Day marathon where they played episodes 1–7.)
Gon and his friends have advanced to the final phase of the Hunter Exam. The final phase is a tournament where the winners are out and the losers advance. The rule is that if a participant kills their opponent, they will be disqualified. The first match is Gon versus Hanzo. Gon cannot do anything against Hanzo, but he refuses to give up. Hanzo is losing his patience and threatens to break Gon's arm.
20	20	"Baffling Turn × of × Events"; Transliteration: "Fukakai na Tenkai" (Japanese: フカカイ×ナ×テンカイ)	Tomoya Tanaka	Yasushi Hirano	February 19, 2012	September 18, 2016
Gon wakes up, and finds himself being congratulated by Satotz for being the first person to pass the Hunter Exam. Gon asks Satotz if the Exam was still going on, and Satotz tells him that it's over. Satotz explains the events that occurred while he was unconscious. Hisoka and Kurapika engage in a short fight during which Hisoka whispers something to Kurapika, and promptly surrenders. In the next round Hanzo forces Pokkle to surrender. Bodoro is beaten by Hisoka. Hisoka whispers into Bodoro's ear which convinces Bodoro to surrender. Killua forfeits the next round because he thinks fighting Pokkle would not interest him. Leorio asks to postpone the next round until Bodoro is in a proper shape to fight. Killua then fights Gittarackur, who is revealed to be Killua's brother Illumi following his facial transformation from the previous phase of the exam. After a tense conversation in which Illumi kills an examiner and threatens to kill Gon, Killua surrenders and falls into a depressed state. The next round between Leorio and Bodoro finally commences, but Killua interrupts it by killing Bodoro and disqualifying himself. Gon then heads to the New Hunter orientation to confront Illumi.
21	21	"Some × Brother × Trouble"; Transliteration: "Kyōdai no Mondai" (Japanese: キョウダイ×ノ×モンダイ)	Tetsuo Yajima	Atsushi Maekawa	March 4, 2012	September 25, 2016
Gon is upset that Killua was forced to kill. Gon is mad at Illumi and proclaims that he will go to Kukuroo Mountain to rescue Killua. As Gon and his friends depart, Satotz mentions that the Hunter Exam is not over yet.
22	22	"A × Dangerous × Watchdog"; Transliteration: "Kiken na Banken" (Japanese: キケン×ナ×バンケン)	Chie Yamashiro	Tsutomu Kamishiro	March 11, 2012	October 2, 2016
After arriving in the Republic of Podokea, Gon, Leorio, and Kurapika board a tour bus to Kukuroo Mountain, where Killua lives. However, they're blocked by a massive "Testing Gate". Anyone who attempts to enter through the side door is eaten by Mike, the watchdog. Gon tells Zebro, the elderly gatekeeper, that they are friends of Killua and asks to be let in. Kurapika eventually realizes the front gate is not locked, unlike the smaller side gate, and Leorio struggles to open the gate. Zebro eventually explains that each door of the gate weighs two tons, the minimum amount of strength required for opening just one door. (The group learns that Killua opened three levels of doors, sixteen tons total.) After arguing with the family butler and attempting to climb over the gate with his fishing pole, Gon's spirit convinces Zebro to open the Testing Gate and accompany them so they can enter without Mike eating them.
23	23	"The × Guard's × Duty"; Transliteration: "Ban'nin no Sekinin" (Japanese: バンニン×ノ×セキニン)	Naomi Nakayama	Mitsutaka Hirota	March 18, 2012	October 9, 2016
Gon and his friends have decided to pass through the Testing Gate to see Killua. Zebro takes them to the servants' quarters where they meet Seaquant and rest for the night. They discover that everything in the house is extremely heavy, so they decide to train so they can be strong enough to open the Testing Gate on their own. Meanwhile, Killua is being tortured by his brother Milluki until he is ready to apologize to his mother. Killua learns from his family that his friends are at the estate to see him. Gon, Leorio, and Kurapika are able to open the gate after Gon's left arm heals and they complete their training, but the apprentice butler Canary stands in their way. Just like with Zebro, Gon's conviction touches Canary's heart. Just as Canary is about to let them pass, Killua's mother attacks her. Killua's mother then gives the group a sad message from Killua that may or may not be true.
24	24	"The × Zoldyck × Family"; Transliteration: "Zorudikku no Kazoku" (Japanese: ゾルディック×ノ×カゾク)	Woo Seung-wook	Shōji Yonemura	March 25, 2012	October 16, 2016
We witness a few flashbacks from Killua's earlier childhood, mostly between him and Canary. When the flashbacks end, Kikyo, Killua's mother, tells them that Killua cannot see them as he is in solitary confinement. While speaking with the trio, Kikyo suddenly begins screaming to "Father" that he not do anything hasty. Killua's grandfather, Zeno, arrives in the dungeon and tells Killua he can go, despite Milluki insisting Killua is not genuinely sorry yet. Killua is summoned by his father, Silva. With help from Canary, who is concerned about Killua, Gon and his friends are getting closer to the mansion. Meanwhile, Killua is bonding with his father (much to Kikyo's strong displeasure), and Silva asks him if he wants to see his friends. Killua answers truthfully that he does, so Silva grants him his freedom with the promise that Killua should never betray his friends. A short squabble between Kikyo and Silva reveals that he still believes Killua will one day return home as the leader of the Zoldyck family.
25	25	"Can't See × If × You're Blind"; Transliteration: "Mienai to Aenai" (Japanese: ミエナイ×ト×アエナイ)	Masaki Matsumura	Yasushi Hirano	April 1, 2012	October 23, 2016
Kikyo confides in Gotoh, the family butler, how emotionally distraught she is over Killua leaving again. With his father's approval, Killua makes his way to the butler's quarters. He instructs Gotoh to let him know the moment Gon and the other arrive. Gotoh complies, but internal dialogue reveals he has other intentions. Canary guides Gon and his friends to the butler office. There, they meet the butler Gotoh, who challenges them to a coin game so he can determine if they are worthy of being Killua's friends. Leorio and Kurapika are disqualified for guessing the wrong hand, leaving only Gon to play the next round. After winning the game and reuniting with Killua, Gon now looks ahead to his next objective. He refuses to use his Hunter's License until he can return Hisoka's number badge. Kurapika reveals that he knows where to find Hisoka and that Hisoka has information about the Phantom Troupe. Leorio and Kurapika leave the group to pursue their own goals. Gon and Killua decide to spend their time training. Everyone agrees to meet again on September 1 in Yorknew City.
26	26	"Then × and × After"; Transliteration: "Arekara to Sorekara" (Japanese: アレカラ×ト×ソレカラ)	Hiroyasu Aoki	Atsushi Maekawa	April 8, 2012	November 6, 2016 (Note: On the broadcast night of October 29–30, 2016, Adult Swim hosted a Mobile Suit Gundam: Iron Blooded Orphans marathon where they played episodes 13–19.)
A letter from Gon arrives at Whale Island for Aunt Mito. A recap of episodes 14 to 25.

=== Heavens Arena arc (2012) ===
No. overall	No. in arc	Title	Directed by	Written by	Original release date	English air date
27	1	"Arrival × At × the Arena"; Transliteration: "Tōgijō ni Tōjō" (Japanese: トウギジョウ×ニ×トウジョウ)	Kim Min-sun	Tsutomu Kamishiro	April 15, 2012	November 13, 2016
Gon and Killua have arrived at the Heavens Arena, where opponents become stronger the higher one ascends the tower, in order to train and earn money. Both of them are immediately advanced to the 50th floor after their initial battles on the 1st floor. There, they meet Zushi, another young teen with amazing strength. When Killua faces off against Zushi, he has no difficulty at all, until Zushi uses a strange technique reminiscent of what Illumi used. Killua is frightened enough to back away, but Zushi's martial arts master, Wing, instructs him to stop the technique. Killua and Gon continue winning fights until they reach the 100th floor. The pair decide to ask Zushi about his strange technique (called "Ren"), but Wing warns them against it. Killua insists he knew because Ren is related to the secret behind his brother's power. In the end, Killua agrees to study under Wing.
28	2	"Nen × and × Nen"; Transliteration: "Nen to Nen" (Japanese: ネン×ト×ネン)	Tomoya Tanaka	Shōji Yonemura	April 22, 2012	November 20, 2016
In Wing's room, Gon, Killua and Zushi are being taught by Wing. He explains the 4 main principles: Ten, Ren, Zetsu and Hatsu. He demonstrates how Ren works, by giving Killua the idea of killing him. Because of the strong pressure, Killua is forced to back off. Wing advises them to train with Zushi and start mastering Ten but Killua suggests that they should leave. Killua reveals to Gon that Wing was lying all along as his teachings do not explain Zushi's extreme resilience he noticed while fighting him. Zushi is troubled because Wing lied to them. Wing only says that for them to know the other meaning of Nen is dangerous. After clearing the 190th floor, Gon and Killua advance to the 200th floor. They are stopped by a strong aura which makes them both wary. An employee appears, stating that they should register before midnight. Hisoka appears out of nowhere, and warns them that they are not ready yet and he will not let them pass. Wing appears behind them and offers to teach them the real Nen. Before leaving, the employee also informs Killua that if he cannot register at the given time, he will never be admitted as he already failed to register for the 200th floor once as a kid. In Wing's room, he finally teaches Gon and Killua the real Nen.
29	3	"Awakening × and × Potential"; Transliteration: "Kakusei to Kanōsei" (Japanese: カクセイ×ト×カノウセイ)	Masaharu Tomoda	Atsushi Maekawa	April 29, 2012	November 27, 2016
Gon and Killua's aura nodes finally open thanks to Wing's help. He teaches them how to pass through Hisoka's barrier of Nen. A few hours before midnight, Gon and Killua come back to the hallway that Hisoka is guarding. They successfully pass through and Gon challenges Hisoka to a fight. Hisoka only replies that if Gon manages to win even one match, Hisoka will accept his challenge. The two successfully register before time runs out. After registering, they are confronted by three fighters from the 200th floor, namely Gido, Sadaso, and Riehlvelt. The two leave and head towards their room. A message saying that Gon's match will be on the next day is seen on the television. The next day, Gido and Gon face off in the arena. Gido launches his spinning tops he calls Battle Waltz. Gon is left defenseless in the middle of the ring.
30	4	"Fierce × and × Ferocious"; Transliteration: "Gekitō to Kattō" (Japanese: ゲキトウ×ト×カットウ)	Chie Yamashiro	Tsutomu Kamishiro	May 6, 2012	December 4, 2016
Gon continues his fight with Gido and begins to understand how the Dancing Tops technique works. After he understands the principle behind the technique he is able to evade the attacks. However, he is not able to go on the offensive because of Gido's Tornado Top defense. Gon continues to fight and manages to release some of his hidden talents but eventually loses the fight. After the fight is over Master Wing chastises Gon and forbids him from learning any more about Nen until his injuries heal. Kurapika is denied a job at the Agency and meets a stranger who tests his skills and offers to teach him about Nen.
31	5	"Destiny × and × Tenacity"; Transliteration: "In'nen to Shūnen" (Japanese: インネン×ト×シュウネン)	Hiroyasu Aoki	Mitsutaka Hirota	May 13, 2012	December 11, 2016
One month after Gon is seriously injured (and banned to directly practice Nen or be part of any match), the 2-year-anniversary match of the Nen-user Kastro against the magician Hisoka is about to start in Heavens Arena. Kastro shows confidence, remembering an old saying, "not to fight if you do not have a chance of winning".
32	6	"A × Surprising × Win"; Transliteration: "Dokkiri na Shōri" (Japanese: ドッキリ×ナ×ショウリ)	Woo Seung-wook	Shōji Yonemura	May 20, 2012	December 18, 2016
Kastro and Hisoka face off in Heavens Arena. Kastro goes on the offensive and appears to have an advantage. Hisoka is unable to dodge because Kastro creates a Nen double that hides behind Kastro's attacks. Despite losing both arms, Hisoka is confident and performs magic tricks, appearing to reattach one arm. He artfully and secretly uses his Hatsu, "Bungee Gum", to kill Kastro with the playing cards from one of his tricks. After the fight, Machi approaches Hisoka and uses Nen to sew both of his arms back on. She has a message from the boss of the Phantom Troupe. After she leaves, Hisoka removes his spider tattoo, revealing that it is a fake.
33	7	"An × Empty × Threat"; Transliteration: "Keihaku na Kyōhaku" (Japanese: ケイハク×ナ×キョウハク)	Kim Min-sun	Yasushi Hirano	May 27, 2012	January 8, 2017
Gon recovers from his injuries and trains in Nen along with Killua and Zushi, under the instruction of Wing. Sadaso, Riehvelt, and Gido kidnap Zushi to coax Killua into agreeing to fight Sadaso if they leave Killua and friends alone, but Sadaso breaks his promise by tricking Gon for the same purpose with Zushi's shoe. Killua threatens his life and Sadaso never shows up to their fight, causing him to lose by default, and giving Killua his first win in the battle of the 200.
34	8	"Power × to × Avenge"; Transliteration: "Jitsuryoku de Setsujoku" (Japanese: ジツリョク×デ×セツジョク)	Tomoya Tanaka	Tsutomu Kamishiro	June 3, 2012	January 15, 2017
Riehvalt and Gido hear of Killua's threat from Sadaso and talk about cheating in their matches to gain the upper hand. Killua interrupts them, demonstrating his speed and cold-blooded demeanor to scare them into playing fairly. After training tirelessly with Zushi and Wing, Gon and Killua defeat Riehvelt and Gido in their battles. Hisoka, impressed with Gon's progress, appears in Gon's way afterwards and invites him to be his next opponent, to which Gon agrees.
35	9	"The × True × Pass"; Transliteration: "Seikaku na Gōkaku" (Japanese: セイカク×ナ×ゴウカク)	Masaki Matsumura	Mitsutaka Hirota	June 17, 2012	January 22, 2017
Gon, Killua, and Zushi train in Nen and learn of the Nen aura types in preparation for Gon's battle. Wing reveals at the end of the training that Gon has officially passed the second Hunter exam, and gives them an update on their friends' progress in this secret Nen exam. The fight between Gon and Hisoka begins, with Hisoka dealing the first punch. Gon shatters a floor tile to create a distraction and manages to successfully land a punch on Hisoka in the face—the bar that Hisoka set for Gon being a worthy opponent.
36	10	"A Big Debt × and × A Small Kick"; Transliteration: "Ōki na kari to Chīsa na keri" (Japanese: オオキナカリ×ト×チイサナケリ)	Masaharu Tomoda	Shōji Yonemura	June 24, 2012	January 29, 2017
Gon gives Hisoka his badge after he hits him in the face as part of their prior agreement. Hisoka explains the types of aura by their personality to distract Gon while using his bungee gum on him. The two keep fighting, with Hisoka using the bungee gum to take control of Gon's movements. Hisoka wins the match because of his technique and a referee that awarded points to end the battle before Gon got seriously injured. He praises Gon for his progress and warns him that they will fight again, but in the real world where their lives are on the line. Killua and Gon bid farewell to Wing and Zushi as they depart to visit Gon's aunt on Whale Island, finally leaving Heavens Arena behind.
37	11	"Ging × and × Gon"; Transliteration: "Jin to Gon" (Japanese: ジン×ト×ゴン)	Chie Yamashiro	Atsushi Maekawa	July 1, 2012	February 5, 2017
Gon heads home to Whale Island along with Killua. Mito and her grandmother tell Gon about Ging's past. Gon receives a small box from his father. Gon eventually manages to open the small box with his Nen and finds three items: a ring, cassette tape, and video game memory card. After examining the unusual ring, they decide to listen to the cassette tape which contains a voice recording of Ging. On the audio Ging asks Gon if he wants to see him.
38	12	"Reply × From × Dad"; Transliteration: "Oyaji no Henji" (Japanese: オヤジ×ノ×ヘンジ)	Hiroyasu Aoki	Yasushi Hirano	July 8, 2012	February 12, 2017
Gon heard his father's message through the cassette tape. Gon and Killua grab some information about the memory card from the item box. Killua gets a lead from his brother about the game which is going to be presented in an auction, which will be held in Yorknew City. The two leave Whale island and journey to Yorknew City.

=== Phantom Troupe arc (2012) ===
No. overall	No. in arc	Title	Directed by	Written by	Original release date	English air date
39	1	"Wish × and × Promise"; Transliteration: "Negai to Chikai" (Japanese: ネガイ×ト×チカイ)	Woo Seung-wook	Tsutomu Kamishiro	July 15, 2012	February 19, 2017
Kurapika leaves his master Mizuken in order to get a job. He finds himself in an interview with an agent to become a bodyguard for someone who has connections with the Southern Piece Auction. He is trained by a man na Mizuken where he learns his Nen is Conjurer. He finds the agent where she finds three options with connections to Yorknew City's Underground Auction on September 1. Kurapika chooses the one who collects human trophies and meets a woman name Melody, and goes through a test to be the bodyguard by successfully retrieving the sample they are assigned to get.
40	2	"Nen × Users × Unite?"; Transliteration: "Nōryokusha wa Kyōryokusha?" (Japanese: ノウリョクシャ×ハ×キョウリョクシャ？)	Tomoya Tanaka	Tsutomu Kamishiro	July 22, 2012	February 26, 2017
Kurapika and the other applicants fight the assailants in order for them to escape the mansion, where Kurapika realizes the assailants are made of Nen controlled by Tocino. A man name Basho uses his Nen ability to create chains that forcepeople to tell truth or else they burn up. A man name Squalla is revealed to be the infiltrator. Meanwhile, Killua asks for his brother's help to gather information about Greed Island and Gon and Killua arrive on the island to meet Leorio and Kurapika.
41	3	"Gathering × of × Heroes"; Transliteration: "Gōketsu no Shūketsu" (Japanese: ゴウケツ×ノ×シュウケツ)	Masaki Matsumura	Mitsutaka Hirota	July 29, 2012	March 5, 2017
After receiving information from Milluki, Gon and Killua research Greed Island where they learn that Greed Island is a game created by Nen practitioners, and in order to play the game, the player must also be a Nen user. Once a player starts the game, they are pulled into the world of Greed Island where they cannot leave, and they will die in the real world if they die in the game. . At the Nostrade manor, Kurapika and the applicants pass and meet their new boss , Neon. Daizonelle, one of the applicants, asks Neon to use her Nen ability to give them great fortune, and realize the auction is too dangerous for Neon. Meanwhile, the Phantom Troupe gathers at Yorknew City.
42	4	"Defend × and × Attack"; Transliteration: "Mamoru to Semeru" (Japanese: マモル×ト×セメル)	Kim Min-sun	Shōji Yonemura	August 5, 2012	March 12, 2017
Gon and Killua meet back up with Leorio and continue to try to make some money by armwrestling. The Phantom Troupe moves out for the Underground Auction. Meanwhile, The Nostrade bodyguards have been assigned to their positions regarding the auction that will be held tonight where Kurapika and Melody will guard the front. Kurapika and Melody have an intimate chat while on guard about his Scarlet Eyes while Melody tells Kurapika the truth about her appearance and abilities.
43	5	"A × Shocking × Tragedy"; Transliteration: "Shōgeki no Sangeki" (Japanese: ショウゲキ×ノ×サンゲキ)	Masaharu Tomoda	Yasushi Hirano	August 12, 2012	March 19, 2017
The Phantom Troupe storms into the auction room and kills everyone inside at the moment, with Baise, Ivlenov, and Tocino (Kurapika's fellow acquaintances who auditioned with him) defending the civilians. Kurapika reports what happened to Dalzollene, and the Phantom Troupe finds out that the merchandise has been moved before their attack by a special force of the mafia known as the Shadow Beasts (an elite group of assassins). The Shadow Beasts catch up to the Phantom Troupe and prepare for battle.
44	6	"Buildup × to a × Fierce Battle"; Transliteration: "Gekisen no Fukusen" (Japanese: ゲキセン×ノ×フクセン)	Chie Yamashiro	Mitsutaka Hirota	August 19, 2012	March 26, 2017
The Shadow Beasts take on Uvogin, where Uvogin easily beats most of them. Kurapika secretly kidnaps Uvogin without his crew knowing for mysterious reasons.
45	7	"Restraint × and × Vow"; Transliteration: "Kōsoku to Yakusoku" (Japanese: コウソク×ト×ヤクソク)	Hiroyasu Aoki	Shōji Yonemura	September 2, 2012	April 2, 2017
The Phantom Troupe decide to follow Kurapika and his bodyguards with the help of Machi's Nen thread and needle she attached to Uvogin. The rest of the Shadow Beast arrive to try to fight the Phantom Troupe, but most of them are killed except for Owl for interrogation. The bodyguards interrogate Uvogin, where he proposes a deal that if they free him, he will let them live but they refuse. Owl reveals the treasure's secrets, while Hisoka secretly meets with Kurapika that he knows about the Phantom Troupe's abilities and offers to team up. The Phantom Troupe frees Uvogin, but he wants to stay behind to kill Kurapika.
46	8	"Chasing × and × Waiting"; Transliteration: "Oumono to Matsumono" (Japanese: オウモノ×ト×マツモノ)	Woo Seung-wook	Yasushi Hirano	September 9, 2012	April 9, 2017
Before answering, Melody tells Kurapika that Uvogin escaped. Hisoka reveals that Chrollo (leader of Phantom Troupe) is sells Scarlet Eyes and does not want to team up but exchange information. Before leaving, Kurapika tells Hisoka to meet him here at the same place the next day. Back in the hotel room, Melody, Kurapika, Squala, Basho, and Linssen learn that Neon's father Light Nostrade is the one who hired them as bodyguards, and Kurapika's plan is to dismantle the Mafia before being confronted by Uvogin. Meanwhile, Gon and Killua nearly enter a fighting ring held by the Mafia, but it is cancelled because they are looking for the Phantom Troupe.
47	9	"Condition × and × Condition"; Transliteration: "Seiyaku to Seiyaku" (Japanese: セイヤク×ト×セイヤク)	Masaki Matsumura	Tsutomu Kamishiro	September 16, 2012	April 16, 2017
On the outskirts of Yorknew in a deserted wasteland, Kurapika seeks vengeance for his fallen brethren by facing Uvogin. It is revealed that Uvogin killed Kurapika clan (the Kurta) five years ago for their Scarlet Eyes. After breaking Kurapika left arm, Kurapika traps Uvogin in his chains. It is revealed in flashbacks that when Kurapika uses his Scarlet Eyes, he is a Specialist (able to use all types of Nen). Enraged at Uvogin lack of empathy in killing people, Kurapika uses his chains to kill him. Back in the Phantom Troupe's hideout, all the remaining members of the Troupe gather and listen to Chrollo Lucilfer who deduces that if whomever Uvogin is after uses a chain, then it's highly likely that his enemy is either a Manipulator or a Conjurer and that is Uvogin weakness. Chrollo then states that they will wait until dawn; if Uvogin has not returned by then, then they will change their plans.
48	10	"Very × Sharp × Eye"; Transliteration: "Mekiki no Kikime" (Japanese: メキキ×ノ×キキメ)	Aki Hayashi	Tsutomu Kamishiro	September 23, 2012	April 23, 2017
Gon, Killua, and Leorio make attempts to raise money to gather information about Greed Island and Phantom Troupe. After Gon pawned his hunter licence for some seed money, he and Killua go to the outside auction market so they may find some hidden treasures to bid on in to raise money and meet a man name Zepille. Leorio calls Gon and informs them that members of the Troupe were located; the trio depart as they leave the auction to Zepile.
49	11	"Pursuit × and × Analysis"; Transliteration: "Tsuiseki de Bunseki" (Japanese: ツイセキ×デ×ブンセキ)	Daisuke Yoshida	Tsutomu Kamishiro	September 30, 2012	April 30, 2017
Gon, Killua, and Leorio watch Machi and Nobunaga (two members of the Spiders) at a distance where they discuss what could have happened to their comrade Uvogin while planning their next move. Shalnark and Chrollo gather information about the Nostrade Family, knowing that the chain user is working for them and Chrollo becomes interested in Neon Nostrade. At the Hotel, Light Nostrade advises his bodyguards to keep his daughter safe at all costs. When Neon leaves the room, Light informs his guards that the Underground Auction will resume at night as the Ten Dons vowed to reclaim the lost items, and orders Kurapika to join the assassins to hunt the Troupe. Gon and Killua are captured by Nobunga as well as Phinks and Pakunoda and are taken to their hideout.
50	12	"Ally × and × Sword"; Transliteration: "Nakama to Katana" (Japanese: ナカマ×ト×カタナ)	Kazuhiro Yoneda	Tsutomu Kamishiro	October 7, 2012	May 7, 2017
Gon and Killua are now in the Phantom Troupe base where they notice Hisoka but pretend to not know each other. The Phantom Troupe ask Gon and Killua if they know the chain user who killed Uvogin, but Killua replies they do not know. The Phantom Troupe release Gon first, but Killua theorizes Kurapika is the chain user, and Pakunoda can use her nen ability to read minds. Nobunga asks Gon if he would join the Phantom Troupe but Gon declines, resulting in Killua and Gon thrown in prison. Gon and Killua escape prison to head back to Yorkview City to get stronger, while Kurapika shares Gon his suspicion that Kurapika killed Uvogin.
51	13	"A × Brutal × Battlefield"; Transliteration: "Hijō no Senjō" (Japanese: ヒジョウ×ノ×センジョウ)	Chie Yamashiro	Mitsutaka Hirota	October 14, 2012	May 14, 2017
Neon escapes to enter the auction with Chrollo's help who later steals her fortune telling ability. A man name Zenji gathers assassins and hitmen (including Kurapika, Silva and Zeno) to fight the Phantom Troupe. Chrollo learns that he'll mourn for lost comrades, be injured, but will remain strong, and to find new teammates. Kurapika and Light confront Chrollo who knocks out Neon due to his anger at Uvogin death, and a battle erupts between the Phantom Troupe and members of the auction.
52	14	"Assault × and × Impact"; Transliteration: "Shūgeki to Shōgeki" (Japanese: シュウゲキ×ト×ショウゲキ)	Woo Seung-wook	Tsutomu Kamishiro	October 21, 2012	May 21, 2017
The Phantom Troupe continues to wreak havoc on the streets of Yorknew City while Kurapika watches over Neon. While patrolling, Kurapika receives a call from Gon and Killua but refuses their help. Zeno and Silva appear and warn the mafia and about a powerful member of the Phantom Troupe who sneaked inside the building and fight Chrollo. Zeno analyzes Chrollo powerful abilities and realizes that since his ability is so powerful, there are at least four or maybe five conditions which Chrollo is very unlikely able to meet while fighting both Zeno and Silva at the same time, resulting in them successfully trapping him.
53	15	"Fake × and × Psyche"; Transliteration: "Feiku de Saiku" (Japanese: フェイク×デ×サイク)	Yasuhiro Aoki	Shōji Yonemura	October 28, 2012	June 4, 2017 (Note: On the broadcast night of May 27–28, 2017, Adult Swim hosted a Samurai Jack Memorial Day marathon where they played all ten episodes of Season 5.)
Illumi and Kalluto arrive to assassinate the Ten Dons, while the leader of the Ten Dons tries to calm down the guests, but it is revealed that Illumi killed the leader. Zeno and Silva leave Chrollo alone, seeing how their target (the leader of Ten Dons) is killed, Chrollo is not their target. Kurapika makes sure Neon is sent to the ambulance, and successfully bids the Scarlet Eyes in the auction. Gon and Killua meet up with Leorio to tell him of their kidnapping and want to learn nen from Kurapika. After seeing Neon wake up and be happy of getting the Scarlet Eyes, Kurapika calls Gon to inform him of the Spiders death, while Hisoka tries to call Kurapika to no avail.
54	16	"Fortunes × Aren't × Right?"; Transliteration: "Uranai ga Ataranai?" (Japanese: ウラナイ×ガ×アタラナイ?)	Masaki Matsumura	Mitsutaka Hirota	November 4, 2012	June 11, 2017
Kurapika meets up with Gon, Leorio, and Killua. While they are having a picnic, Gon helps Kurapika realize that he can now focus on his main goal of getting his people's eyes back. Kurapika reveals that he met Hisoka, who has the Nen ability to use all types of Nen. However, Hisoka's lifespan is shortened by one hour for every second he uses this ability. Kurapika explains why he must not use it against anyone other than the Troupe. Kurapika receives a message from Hisoka saying that Chrollo is not dead as previously thought. Meanwhile, Chrollo orders the Phantom Troupe to leave Yorknew City by tonight, but Nostrade refuses, challenging Chrollo's authority. Chrollo uses his new fortune-telling ability, stolen from Neon, to read the futures of the various Troupe members. Hisoka's fortune says he will team up with Kurapika and face Chrollo alone. When he gives his fortune to Pakunoda, however, it changes, revealing Hisoka's plan to the others and angering Nobunga at the possibility of Hisoka revealing Uvogin's location.
55	17	"Allies × and × Lies"; Transliteration: "Nakama to Ikasama" (Japanese: ナカマ×ト×イカサマ)	Aki Hayashi	Shōji Yonemura	November 11, 2012	June 18, 2017
After reading Hisoka fortune, Nobunaga accuses him of selling out the Phantom Troupe to the Chain User, but Hisoka tells them that the first verse with the Chain User is true, but after that, he cannot explain the rest. Chrollo teleports Nobunga away, and goes over Hisoka card with the group. It is revealed that Hisoka used his Nen ability to fake his fortune to the group. Meanwhile, Killua does not want to pursue the Phantom Troupe with Gon to get funds for Greed Island, but Gon refuses. The four decide to come up with a plan, Killua will stake out the Troupe base for Pakunoda. Leorio will be the driver for Kurapika and Gon will act as a decoy so Pakunoda can be snatched away. Gon asks Kurapika to put a Nen blade near his heart to increase his resolve to get stronger, while Chrollo splits off the Phantom Troupe group to distract Gon and his friends when they confront him.
56	18	"Beloved × and × Beleaguered"; Transliteration: "Saiai to Saiaku" (Japanese: サイアイ×ト×サイアク)	Daisuke Yoshida	Tsutomu Kamishiro	November 18, 2012	June 25, 2017
Gon, Leorio, Killua, and Kurapika find out there are multiple buildings constructed with Nen by Kortopi, while Chrollo realizes that Kurapika is the reason why Uvogin is killed due to vengenance for killing his Clan, and his bond with Neon. The Phantom Troupe attack the hotel Gon and his friends are staying and captures Gon and Killua. Squala is confronted by the Phantom Troupe and is decapitated while Pakunoda uses Memory Bomb, a Nen ability to shoot thoughts in people heads, on Nobunaga and Kortopi to give them a clear image of what Kurapika looks like.
57	19	"Initiative × and × Law"; Transliteration: "Sente to Okite" (Japanese: センテ×ト×オキテ)	Kazuhiro Yoneda	Shōji Yonemura	December 2, 2012	July 9, 2017 (Note: On the broadcast night of July 1–2, 2017, Adult Swim hosted an Attack on Titan marathon where they played the first 9 episodes of Season 2.)
After Gon and Killua are captured by the Phantom Troupe, Chrollo orders the other members to meet at Hotel Beitacle. Melody overhears their conversation and goes there first with Kurapika. They have formed a plan. Meanwhile, Leorio secretly tells Gon and Killua the plan at the hotel where they are held. Nobunga thinks that Gon and Killua plan to rejoin the Phantom Troupe. Killua stalls Pakunoda from using her Nen ability and then tries to escape, but fails. Meanwhile, Kurapika throws a sword attached to a letter to Nobunga. The letter says that if Pakunoda talks about Gon and Killua's memories, Kurapika will kill Chrollo. Kurapika calls Phink and tells Pakunoda to meet him at a secret location. She must accept his three demands, or else he will kill Chrollo. Hisoka debates meeting Chrollo alone and decides to call Illumi.
58	20	"Signal × to × Retreat"; Transliteration: "Hikigiwa no Hikigane" (Japanese: ヒキギワ×ノ×ヒキガネ)	Chie Yamashiro	Tsutomu Kamishiro	December 9, 2012	July 16, 2017
Kurapika negotiates with Pakunoda to secure the release of Gon and Killua. He states two conditions: first, Chrollo is forbidden to use Nen; second, he may not contact any member of the Phantom Troupe. Pakunoda returns to the Troupe's hideout and announces the terms of the exchange to the other members. After she accepts the conditions, Kurapika puts the chain on Chrollo and repeats her conditions: first, she must release Gon and Killua unharmed before midnight, with no trickery, and she must not speak a single word about him. She accepts, and Kurapika puts the chain on her before leaving. The Phantom Troupe bickers amongst themselves before Frankie intervenes, making the Troupe agree with Pakunoda's decision. The deal is successful. Hisoka plans to fight Chrollo, but he is shocked to find out that Chrollo cannot use Nen. Hisoka's true fortune is revealed: meeting Chrollo on Tuesday. By the time Hisoka leaves, the number of the Phantom Troupe will be cut in half. Pakunoda shoots her six Memory Bullets at the Phantom Troupe when they start arguing again. Then, she is killed when Kurapika's Judgement Chain activates. Gon and Killua head to the Greed Island auction, but they are shocked to see Phinks and Feitan, who are there to enjoy the auction. They tell Gon and Killua that Pakunoda wanted to thank them before leaving.

=== Greed Island arc (2012–13) ===
No. overall	No. in arc	Title	Directed by	Written by	Original release date	English air date
59	1	"Bid × and × Haste"; Transliteration: "Seri to Aseri" (Japanese: セリ×ト×アセリ)	Won Seung-wook	Tsutomu Kamishiro	December 16, 2012	July 23, 2017
After passing out for two days, Kurapika wakes up. Meanwhile, Gon and Killua head toward the auction and approach a man named Battera to play Greed Island. Battera asks Tsezguerra to evaluate their Nen levels, and they both fail because they do not have enough Nen to survive the game. Phinks and Feitan steal a copy of Greed Island and bring it to their hideout, where they enter the game. Gon and Killua plan to strengthen their Nen and start creating their Nen abilities. Kurapika recommends that Gon call his Nen master, Wing, for help. Wing tells Gon that Enhancers don't need special abilities because they are balanced in offense and defense. He advises Gon not to follow Kurapika's path. Gon unlocks a new ability by channeling all his Nen into his fist, and Killua develops his electric powers.
60	2	"End × and × Beginning"; Transliteration: "Kimari to Hajimari" (Japanese: キマリ×ト×ハジマリ)	Hiroyasu Aoki	Tsutomu Kamishiro	December 23, 2012	July 30, 2017
Leorio tells Killua and Gon that Kurapika and Melody have left for Yorknew City to continue working with the Nostrade family. The next day, Gon and Killua attend a Greed Island screening and pass it. Afterwards, Gon, Killua, and Leorio celebrate at a restaurant. Leorio then leaves to take a doctor's exam. Gon and Killua then enter the game, where they are given a ring and explained the rules. Their objective is to fill 100 card slots. All items picked up on the island transform into cards. They can materialize these cards into item form by holding them and saying "Gain". However, if a card is not placed inside the binder within a minute, it reverts to its original item form and can never be converted back into a card, forcing the player to find the item again. Before stepping into the game, Gon receives a message from his father, Ging, through his ring. Ging says that he created the Greed Island game and that there will be no clues to his whereabouts in the game.
61	3	"Invitation × and × Friend"; Transliteration: "Kan'yū to Shin'yū" (Japanese: カンユウ×ト×シンユウ)	Masaki Matsumura	Shōji Yonemura	January 6, 2013	August 6, 2017
Gon waits for Killua to enter the game and encounters Latzara, who nearly captures Killua but retreats due to his fear of Killua's murderous intent. Meanwhile, at the Phantom Troupe hideout, Shalnark invites Shizuku and Kortopi to play Greed Island with him since they will have nothing to do once they get home. They immediately agree. After eating at a restaurant, Gon and Killua head to a meeting place, where they learn more about how to obtain cards. Gon and Killua decline the invitation to join, as Gon wants to finish the game alone. Unbeknownst to them, Biscuit Krueger is watching.
62	4	"Reality? × and × Raw"; Transliteration: "Genjitsu? to Genseki" (Japanese: ゲンジツ?×ト×ゲンセキ)	Aki Hayashi	Tsutomu Kamishiro	January 13, 2013	August 13, 2017
After completing the Rock, Paper, Scissors tournament, Gon and Killua go to Masadora City to buy spell cards and a map. Biscuit is still shadowing them. Meanwhile, Puhata, Abengane, Jispa, and others meet with Nickes and his team to form a party and defeat the game. Shalnark, Shizuku, and Kortopi enter the game and realize that Greed Island warps players to different parts of the world. The game utilizes people with Nen abilities to do so, and players can take items out of the game to complete it. Biscuit decides to join their party, and they come across a game event in which a young boy is sick with a disease. He gives money to an NPC. On the way back to Masadora City, the trio is attacked by a Cyclops, a Melanin Lizard, and a Bubble Horse. Biscuit reveals her battle experience during the attack. In the end, Biscuit reveals that she has 40 years of Nen experience and decides to become their teacher.
63	5	"A × Hard × Master?"; Transliteration: "Shishō wa Hijō?" (Japanese: シショウ×ハ×ヒジョウ?)	Daisuke Yoshida	Mitsutaka Hirota	January 20, 2013	August 20, 2017
Biscuit reveals that she is Wing's teacher and explains that her main reason for playing the game is to find a jewel called the Blue Planet, which can only be found in Greed Island. Binolt tries to attack them, but Biscuit captures him and uses him to train the two boys for ten days straight. They go to the city of Masadora, where they get some cards. However, Biscuit tells them to backtrack to a rocky area from earlier. She says they are going to travel straight to Masadora, but this time they must dig through the rocks. While doing so, they discover another part of Ten: Shu.
64	6	"Strengthen × and × Threaten"; Transliteration: "Kyōka to Kyōkatsu" (Japanese: キョウカ×ト×キョウカツ)	Kazuhiro Yoneda	Tsutomu Kamishiro	January 27, 2013	August 27, 2017
After learning how to use Shu, the three of them make it to Masadora. However, they are told to return to the rocky area to obtain the remaining monster cards. They catch a few monsters, then move on to capture the Bubble Horse. They obtain the card by dodging white bubbles with Zetsu and red bubbles with Ten. Meanwhile, Gon and Killua learn Ko, Ken, and Ryu for 30 minutes straight. Biscuit believes they are now ready for the final stage of their training—practicing in the individual categories, beginning with the Enhancer category. Meanwhile, Nickes's alliance has gathered in a cave with 133 cards, 90 of which are restricted. The Bomber identifies himself in the group and uses his Nen ability to place bombs on everyone else to obtain the restricted cards. He kills those who object. The Phantom Troupe discovers the island and confirms their suspicion that Greed Island is happening in the real world.
65	7	"Evil Fist × and × Rock-Paper-Scissors"; Transliteration: "Jaken to Janken" (Japanese: ジャケン×ト×ジャンケン)	Chie Yamashiro	Shōji Yonemura	February 3, 2013	September 10, 2017 (Note: On the broadcast night of September 2–3, 2017, Adult Swim hosted a Dragon Ball Z Kai: The Final Chapters Labor Day marathon where they played episodes 123–130 followed by an episode of Attack on Titan.)
After hearing Biscuit's lecture on rock-paper-scissors, Gon decides to work on a special technique modeled on rock-paper-scissors by using Enhancer, Emitter, and Transmuter abilities. Meanwhile, Killua leaves the game temporarily to take the Hunter Exam. While he is gone, Gon and Biscuit learn about the Bomber's most recent attack.
66	8	"Strategy × and × Scheme"; Transliteration: "Kōryaku to Sakuryaku" (Japanese: コウリャク×ト×サクリャク)	Woo Seung-wook	Tsutomu Kamishiro	February 10, 2013	September 17, 2017
Killua returns after easily passing his second try at the Hunter Exam. Now that Gon, Killua, and Biscuit are together again, they begin working on beating this game by collecting cards. Meanwhile, the other players are scheming to gather the cards they need to complete the game.
67	9	"15 × 15"; Transliteration: "Jū-go to Jū-go" (Japanese: 15×ト×15)	Hiroyasu Aoki	Tsutomu Kamishiro	February 17, 2013	September 24, 2017
Team Genthru now has 96 types of restricted slot cards after tricking Team Tsezguerra. Gon and Killua receive an invitation from other players to team up to prevent Genthru from beating the game. They head to Soufrabi to monopolize Patch of Shore, one of the cards Genthru is missing.
68	10	"Pirates × and × Guesses"; Transliteration: "Kaizoku to Suisoku" (Japanese: カイゾク×ト×スイソク)	Masaki Matsumura	Atsushi Maekawa	February 24, 2013	October 1, 2017
When they reach Soufrabi, they meet the pirates and challenge the team in a sports battle. While their team loses, Killua does gather information and the other teams working with them disband from their group. They use the accompany card to meet up with Chrollo Lucilfer, which is actually Hisoka in disguise, and he leads them to the city of love, Aiai.
69	11	"A × Heated × Showdown"; Transliteration: "Taiketsu de Nekketsu" (Japanese: タイケツ×デ×ネッケツ)	Aki Hayashi	Shōji Yonemura	March 3, 2013	October 8, 2017
Gon and his friends have teamed up with Hisoka and Goreinu to challenge Razor again. To round out the party, they recruit Team Tsezgerra. Their preparations allow them to breeze through the first few matches, but then Razor challenges them to a game of dodgeball.
70	12	"Guts × and × Courage"; Transliteration: "Konjō to Yūjō" (Japanese: コンジョウ×ト×ユウジョウ)	Daisuke Yoshida	Shōji Yonemura	March 10, 2013	October 15, 2017
Gon is unable to hold onto Razor's throw and is sent to the outfield. He uses Back to return, but Hisoka is also injured and the situation looks grim. However, Gon has an idea for defeating Razor, but he needs Killua's help to pull it off.
71	13	"Bargain × and × Deal"; Transliteration: "Kakehiki to Torihiki" (Japanese: カケヒキ×ト×トリヒキ)	Kazuhiro Yoneda	Shōji Yonemura	March 17, 2013	October 22, 2017
Gon, Killua, and Hisoka manage to defeat Razor by working as a perfect team. After defeating Razor, Gon learns a little more about his father from Razor. The team gets Patch of Shore, and make two clones. Gon's team receives the real card, which Genthru does not expect. Team Tsezgerra will delay Genthru for three weeks, giving Killua time to heal and Gon time to train to defeat Little Flower.
72	14	"Chase × and × Chance"; Transliteration: "Cheisu de Chansu" (Japanese: チェイス×デ×チャンス)	Woo Seung-wook	Tsutomu Kamishiro	March 24, 2013	November 5, 2017 (Note: On the broadcast night of October 28–29, 2017, Adult Swim hosted a Samurai Jack marathon where they played all ten episodes of Season 5.)
Hisoka meets up with the members of the Phantom Troupe in order to track down the Nen user whose ability is to remove others' Nen. Meanwhile, Team Tsezgerra has gathered enough Accompany cards to evade Team Genthru, declaring their decision to fight instead of surrender. Team Genthru had also collected Accompany cards and begin "a game of tag they cannot lose". Gon continues his training whilst Killua is left to recover his hands while coming up with a plan to defeat the Bombers. As planned, Tsezgerra soon runs out of Accompany and Return cards, and uses Leave to exit the game. However, shockingly, no one was guarding the place where the Greed Island consoles were stored. A cornered Tsezgerra finds Mr. Battera crying and discovers that the whole deal had been canceled.
73	15	"Insanity × and × Sanity"; Transliteration: "Kyōki to Shōki" (Japanese: キョウキ×ト×ショウキ)	Chie Yamashiro	Tsutomu Kamishiro	March 31, 2013	November 12, 2017
After Team Tsezgerra left the game, Mr. Battera reveals the true purpose behind why he purchased so many Greed Island games. Team Genthru have set camp up at the entrance to wait out Tsezgerra, only to be disappointed when Tsezgerra never returns. Assuming that Tsezgerra and his team have given up on the game, Genthru approaches Team Gon to propose a deal for the two remaining cards they require. When things turn sour, Team Gon force a one-on-one battle with Genthru's team.
74	16	"Victor × and × Loser"; Transliteration: "Shōsha to Haisha" (Japanese: ショウシャ×ト×ハイシャ)	Masaki Matsumura	Tsutomu Kamishiro	April 7, 2013	November 19, 2017
With two of the members of Team Genthru down, Gon is left in a standoff with just Genthru himself. Everything Gon and his team had planned was coming together, but Gon decides to temporarily ignore the plan to try something out, getting badly damaged in the process. Gon finally pulls through as Team Genthru is defeated. With the most dangerous team all tied up and Gon now having collected all 99 reserved card slots, a special game event is due to take place in order to receive the #00 card.
75	17	"Ging's Friends × and × True Friends"; Transliteration: "Jin no tomo to Shin no tomo" (Japanese: ジンノトモ×ト×シンノトモ)	Hiroyasu Aoki	Tsutomu Kamishiro	April 14, 2013	December 3, 2017
Gon, Killua and Biscuit are challenged when they finally get all 99 reserved card slots. An in-game event takes place to win the #00 card.

=== Chimera Ant arc (2013–14) ===
No. overall	No. in arc	Title	Directed by	Written by	Original release date	English air date
76	1	"Reunion × and × Understanding"; Transliteration: "Saikai to Rikai" (Japanese: サイカイ×ト×リカイ)	Daisuke Yoshida	Tsutomu Kamishiro	April 21, 2013	December 10, 2017
Gon and Killua use an Accompany card to travel to Ging, which ends up taking them to Kite instead. Kite tells Gon of his past and how he came to meet Gon's father, introducing them to a mysterious and extremely dangerous species, the Chimera Ant.
77	2	"Unease × and × Sighting"; Transliteration: "Fuan to Shutsugen" (Japanese: フアン×ト×シュツゲン)	Aki Hayashi	Tsutomu Kamishiro	April 28, 2013	December 17, 2017
Kite is shown a huge severed arm, believed to be from a Chimera Ant Queen that has grown to the height of two meters. As Gon and Killua join him in his search for the Queen, their fears are confirmed when it starts consuming humans to enhance its army of soldiers.
78	3	"Very × Rapid × Reproduction"; Transliteration: "Kyūsoku na Zōshoku" (Japanese: キュウソク×ナ×ゾウショク)	Junichi Fujise	Tsutomu Kamishiro	May 5, 2013	January 7, 2018
Kite and his party trace the whereabouts of the Chimera Ant Queen and conclude that it is located in the neo-Luddite nation of NGL. As both Kite's group and another separate team of Hunters depart to NGL to investigate, the Queen establishes her stronghold and instructs her soldiers to gather a huge number of humans for her to consume in order to give birth to the King.
79	4	"No × Good × NGL"; Transliteration: "NG na NGL" (Japanese: NG×ナ×NGL)	Woo Seung-wook	Tsutomu Kamishiro	May 12, 2013	January 14, 2018
Upholding their policy of not allowing any kind of manufactured or artificial material inside their borders, the NGL only allows Kite, Gon, Killua and two other members of their party to enter their country, with the rest forced to stand by and await their return. Meanwhile, the second team of Hunters is attacked by the Chimera Ants, whose human DNA triggers in them a sense of individuality that brings conflict among their ranks.
80	5	"Evil × and × Terrible"; Transliteration: "Gokuaku to Saiaku" (Japanese: ゴクアク×ト×サイアク)	Migmi	Tsutomu Kamishiro	May 19, 2013	January 21, 2018
As the top echelons of the NGL are killed by the Chimera Ants, who claim their weapons and facilities, the team of Hunters under attack is also taken down, but not before Ponzu sends a message to warn the Hunter Association that ends up in Kite's hands. As he instructs the others to turn back and call for reinforcements, Kite decides to further assess the situation, accompanied by just Gon and Killua.
81	6	"The × Fight × Begins"; Transliteration: "Tatakai no Kaishi" (Japanese: タタカイ×ノ×カイシ)	Hiroyasu Aoki	Tsutomu Kamishiro	May 26, 2013	January 28, 2018
Confirming his suspicions, Kite finds clues about the dark side of the NGL and meet Rammot, one of the Chimera Ants. Knowing that much stronger foes await them ahead, Kite declares that Gon and Killua must defeat the enemy by themselves, or they will not be allowed to proceed further with him. Meanwhile, the Chimera Ant commanders take heed of Nen-enhanced humans and make plans to capture them in order to attend the Queen's increasing demands for nutrition.
82	7	"Kite × and × Slots"; Transliteration: "Kaito no Surotto" (Japanese: カイト×ノ×スロット)	Masaki Matsumura	Shōji Yonemura	June 2, 2013	February 4, 2018
Searching for the Chimera Ant's nest, Kite and the boys confirm their suspicions about the NGL and must face three dangerous Chimera Ants in order to proceed. Meanwhile, Rammot wants to pay back Gon and Killua for his defeat and ends up unwittingly unlocking the power of Nen in his body.
83	8	"Inspiration × to × Evolve"; Transliteration: "Kanka Shite Shinka" (Japanese: カンカ×シテ×シンカ)	Daisuke Yoshida	Shōji Yonemura	June 9, 2013	February 11, 2018
News about the Chimera Ant threat reaches the Hunter Association and an expedition is assembled to exterminate them. Meanwhile, Kite, Gon, and Killua are surrounded by a large number of enemies and must fight for their lives. Back at the nest, the other squadron leaders look for a way to awaken the Nen in their bodies just like Rammot did.
84	9	"A × Fated × Awakening"; Transliteration: "Sadame no Mezame" (Japanese: サダメ×ノ×メザメ)	Woo Seung-wook	Tsutomu Kamishiro	June 16, 2013	February 18, 2018
As Gon, Killua, and Kite approach the nest, one of the Chimera Ant Royal Guards, Neferpitou, awakens. Rammot is humbled by their aura. Neferpitou discovers Pokkle hiding himself among corpses and proceeds to extract the human's knowledge of Nen for the Chimera Ants' use.
85	10	"Light × and × Darkness"; Transliteration: "Hikari to Kage" (Japanese: ヒカリ×ト×カゲ)	Aki Hayashi	Tsutomu Kamishiro	June 23, 2013	February 25, 2018
As the Chimera Ants are reunited to unlock the power of Nen in their bodies, Neferpitou senses Kite approaching and leaves to confront him. Realizing that the enemy is too powerful for them, Kite warns Gon and Killua to flee, but Gon is taken by rage upon seeing Kite's arm being severed by Neferpitou. Killua is forced to knock Gon out and escape carrying him. Kite uses his ability to begin his battle with Neferpitou. After escaping the NGL, with Gon still unconscious, Killua is approached by Chairman Netero, who has been sent there to wipe out the Chimera Ants with the help of two other Pro Hunters, Morel and Knov. The episode ends with a heavily injured Neferpitou having Kite's head in his lap, where he concludes he really is very strong.
86	11	"Promise × and × Reunion"; Transliteration: "Chikai to Saikai" (Japanese: チカイ×ト×サイカイ)	Migmi	Tsutomu Kamishiro	June 30, 2013	March 4, 2018
Gon and Killua meet Knov's student Palm and learn that to earn a place in the Extermination Squad and return to the NGL, they must win against Morel's students Knuckle and Shoot in one month. To increase their chances of winning, Palm asks for Biscuit's help and they start a harsh training routine with her. Meanwhile, at the Chimera Ants' nest, Shaiapouf, the second Royal Guard, awakens.
87	12	"Duel × and × Escape"; Transliteration: "Kettō Shite Tōsō" (Japanese: ケットウ×シテ×トウソウ)	Hiroyasu Aoki	Shōji Yonemura	July 7, 2013	March 11, 2018
After completing their training, Biscuit sends the exhausted Gon and Killua to face Knuckle. Looking at the condition of their opponents, Knuckle boasts that they could never move him an inch and bets his token on it. However his assumptions are proven wrong when Gon manages to land a powerful hit that knocks him out cold, and after awakening, Knuckle agrees that he will help them with their training until the deadline for returning the token comes. Meanwhile, at the nest, Neferpitou focuses on reviving Kite for a second chance to fight him. Netero's team starts taking down small groups of Chimera Ants, drawing the attention of the captains, while the king grows strong inside the queen's womb. As Gon and Killua spend their days training with Biscuit and sparring with Knuckle, the second of Morel's disciples, Shoot, makes plans about how to deal with them.
88	13	"Rock-Paper-Scissors × and × Weakness"; Transliteration: "Janken to Jakuten" (Japanese: ジャンケン×ト×ジャクテン)	Masaki Matsumura	Shōji Yonemura	July 14, 2013	March 18, 2018
As the deadline established by Netero approaches, the Chairman and his companions continue wiping out the Chimera Ant squads one by one and the remaining squad captains try to deal with the problem, while the final Royal Guard Menthuthuyoupi is born. Meanwhile, Gon and Killua complete their training and challenge Knuckle for real.
89	14	"Compassion × and × Strength"; Transliteration: "Yasashisa to Tsuyosa" (Japanese: ヤサシサ×ト×ツヨサ)	Daisuke Yoshida	Shōji Yonemura	July 21, 2013	March 25, 2018
Knuckle points out that Gon's Jajanken technique has two major weaknesses: that it takes too long to charge and the distribution of aura in his body makes him more vulnerable during said charge. However Gon keeps using it instead, making use of these flaws to confuse his opponent. Unfortunately, just as Gon has a chance to deal a finishing blow, he collapses from exhaustion. Killua than carries Gon away, promising to return the next day for the decisive battle against Knuckle and Shoot. As Gon rests for the upcoming fight, Biscuit approaches Killua spars with him in her most powerful form, exposing his own biggest flaw: Killua always fights on the verge of fleeing.
90	15	"Interest × and × Curse"; Transliteration: "Risoku to Jubaku" (Japanese: リソク×ト×ジュバク)	Woo Seung-wook	Tsutomu Kamishiro	July 28, 2013	April 8, 2018 (Note: Also aired in Japanese on April 1, 2018 as part of Adult Swim's April Fools prank.)
The final duel between Gon and Knuckle begins. Just as he promised, Knuckle does not hold back and uses his special technique on him, forcing Gon to look for a way to defeat him as fast as possible. Meanwhile, Killua confronts Shoot, but he also gets himself in a pinch when his old habit to avoid stronger enemies is triggered.
91	16	"The Strong × and × the Weak"; Transliteration: "Kyōsha to Jakusha" (Japanese: キョウシャ×ト×ジャクシャ)	Aki Hayashi	Tsutomu Kamishiro	August 4, 2013	April 15, 2018
The Chimera Ant King's premature birth renders the Queen in critical condition as he and the Royal Guard leave the nest. The squadron leaders disband except for Colt and a few loyalists, who surrender themselves to Netero's party in exchange for help to save the queen's life. Meanwhile, Shoot and Knuckle, having defeated Gon and Killua, arrive at the NGL to join the others. Killua promises to protect Gon as long as his powers are sealed, but decides to leave his side for good once he recovers.
92	17	"One Wish × and × Two Promises"; Transliteration: "Hitotsu no Negai to Futatsu no Chikai" (Japanese: ヒトツノネガイ×ト×フタツノチカイ)	Yukiyo Teramoto	Tsutomu Kamishiro	August 11, 2013	April 22, 2018
Despite all efforts to save the queen, she succumbs to her wounds and dies, but not before revealing the name she had chosen for the king: "Meruem". A final live offspring is found inside her body. Colt vows to protect the child and Morel offers to place them under his protection, on the condition Colt never eats humans again. As the other squad leaders leave to build their own colonies, the King and the Royal Guard arrive at the neighboring country of East Gorteau.
93	18	"Date × With × Palm"; Transliteration: "Pāmu to Dēto" (Japanese: パーム×ト×デート)	Migmi	Shōji Yonemura	August 18, 2013	April 29, 2018
As the king kills the ruler of East Gorteau and takes over the country, Gon and Killua return to meet Palm, prepared to face her fury upon failing to fulfill their promise, but she decides to forgive them when Gon accepts her request to have a date with her. After learning from Morel that they found Kite, Gon takes Palm for her date, while Killua keeps trailing them in case of an enemy attack. His fears are confirmed when Rammot appears before him.
94	19	"Friend × and × Journey"; Transliteration: "Tomodachi to Tabidachi" (Japanese: トモダチ×ト×タビダチ)	Junichi Fujise	Shōji Yonemura	September 1, 2013	May 6, 2018
Divided between his drive to flee and his will to protect Gon, Killua finds himself in a dire situation, until he realizes that he is under the effect of one Illumi's needles, easily killing Rammot after he breaks free from it. Meanwhile, Gon's date with Palm takes a turn for the worse when he claims that he cannot stay by her side. As Shoot returns to check on them, Morel and Knuckle confront Cheetu, one of the Chimera Ants on the run.
95	20	"Grudge × and × Dread"; Transliteration: "Urami to Sugomi" (Japanese: ウラミ×ト×スゴミ)	Masaki Matsumura	Tsutomu Kamishiro	September 8, 2013	May 13, 2018
After a brief fight with Cheetu, Morel and Knuckle return to check on Gon and Killua as they finally reunite with Kite. Upon seeing that Kite was turned into a mindless rogue by Neferpitou, Gon swears to avenge him. The Hunters then travel to East Gorteau, where the government summons the entire population to meet at the capital for an undisclosed event in ten days. Knowing that it is all a plan of the Chimera Ants, Netero contacts the others and they start planning to confront the king and the Royal Guard the night before the event.
96	21	"A × Lawless × Home"; Transliteration: "Muhō na Hōmu" (Japanese: ムホウ×ナ×ホーム)	Woo Seung-wook; Shinichirō Ushijima	Tsutomu Kamishiro	September 15, 2013	May 20, 2018
As news about the rogue Chimera Ants spreads around the world, six members of the Phantom Troupe appear at Meteor City to wipe out Ants which have established a colony there under Zazan.
97	22	"Carnage × and × Devastation"; Transliteration: "Gekitō de Gekimetsu" (Japanese: ゲキトウ×デ×ゲキメツ)	Daisuke Yoshida	Tsutomu Kamishiro	September 22, 2013	June 3, 2018
The Phantom Troupe reaches Zazan, the leader of the Ants, eliminating all opposition on the way. Fighting Zazan by himself, Feitan is forced to unleash his true power against her, which is feared even by his companions.
98	23	"Infiltration × and × Selection"; Transliteration: "Sennyū to Senbetsu" (Japanese: センニュウ×ト×センベツ)	Aki Hayashi	Shōji Yonemura	September 29, 2013	June 10, 2018
Once inside East Gorteau, Gon and Killua take separate ways in preparation for the attack on the palace, but once alone, it does not take long for Gon to be attacked by Ants sent by Meleoron, whose presence is concealed thanks to his chameleon-like powers.
99	24	"Combination × and × Evolution"; Transliteration: "Konbinēshon to Eboryūshon" (Japanese: コンビネーション×ト×エボリューション)	Migmi	Shōji Yonemura	October 9, 2013	June 17, 2018
As Gon deals with his enemies, Killua tries his best to save the citizens of nearby villages from falling prey to the Chimera Ants' scheme until the Government, under the Royal Guards' control, declares martial law to hinder his plans. Meanwhile, Shoot and Knuckle detect Cheetu's presence and attempt to intercept him.
100	25	"Tracking × and × Pursuit"; Transliteration: "Tsuiseki ni wa Tsuigeki" (Japanese: ツイセキ×ニハ×ツイゲキ)	Junichi Fujise	Shōji Yonemura	October 16, 2013	June 24, 2018
Leol's party is sent by the Royal Guard to stop Killua's interference. Meleoron is found out by Gon, but instead of fighting, the Chimera Ant attempts to reason with him while hiding his true intentions.
101	26	"Ikalgo × and × Lightning"; Transliteration: "Ikarugo to Ikazuchi" (Japanese: イカルゴ×ト×イカズチ)	Yukiyo Teramoto	Shōji Yonemura	October 23, 2013	July 1, 2018
Killua confronts Ikalgo, but later saves him from getting eaten by his own subordinates. The Ortho Siblings confront Killua in their game, a 1-501 dart game where he gets continuously attacked. After feigning death, Killua beheads his opponents in a flash, but he collapses due to extreme blood loss. Ikalgo decides to repay the favor by taking him to be treated.
102	27	"Power × and × Games"; Transliteration: "Nōryoku to Taikyoku" (Japanese: ノウリョク×ト×タイキョク)	Woo Seung-wook	Tsutomu Kamishiro	October 30, 2013	July 8, 2018
Gon becomes friends with Meleoron, who in return reveals the true extent of his powers and the reason why he wants the king dead. As the Hunters make adjustments in their preparations to storm the palace, the king entertains himself with board games until an unusual player appears before him.
103	28	"Check × and × Mate"; Transliteration: "Tsumi to Yomi" (Japanese: ツミ×ト×ヨミ)	Masaki Matsumura	Tsutomu Kamishiro	November 6, 2013	July 15, 2018
Despite having mastered the rules of the board game "Gungi", the king is upset for still being unable to defeat the champion, Komugi. Meanwhile, Morel is approached by Cheetu, who uses his new abilities to trap him inside a closed space, claiming that he cannot leave unless he manages to catch him in 8 hours.
104	29	"Doubt × and × Hesitation"; Transliteration: "Mayoi to Tomadoi" (Japanese: マヨイ×ト×トマドイ)	Daisuke Yoshida	Tsutomu Kamishiro	November 13, 2013	July 22, 2018
As the king is yet to defeat his opponent, Cheetu tries to provoke Morel into running after him with no success, unaware that he is setting a trap for him. Meanwhile, Knov realizes the enemy's trick to detect him and comes up with countermeasures against it.
105	30	"Resolve × and × Awakening"; Transliteration: "Kakugo to Kakusei" (Japanese: カクゴ×ト×カクセイ)	Aki Hayashi	Shōji Yonemura	November 20, 2013	July 29, 2018
The king attempts to intimidate Komugi, but moved by her determination, he rips off his own arm as a form of apology. With Neferpitou using their powers to treat the king, the palace's defenses are lowered and Knov rushes to sneak inside it in preparations for the hunters' attack. Meanwhile, Palm prepares to infiltrate the palace as well.
106	31	"Knov × and × Morel"; Transliteration: "Novu to Morau" (Japanese: ノヴ×ト×モラウ)	Migmi	Shōji Yonemura	November 27, 2013	August 5, 2018
Knov succeeds in his mission to breach the palace's security, but just feeling the proximity of the Royal Guards' overwhelming aura is enough to drive him into hopelessness. Palm takes advantage of the lecherous secretary Bizeff to infiltrate the palace as well. Morel is confronted by the Chimera Ant Leol, who fights using the powers of those who owe him a favour.
107	32	"Return × and × Retire"; Transliteration: "Ritān to Ritaia" (Japanese: リターン×ト×リタイア)	Junichi Fujise	Shōji Yonemura	December 4, 2013	August 12, 2018
Even with his borrowed powers, Leol is defeated by Morel. Killua recovers from his wounds and invites Ikalgo to join his side. Meanwhile, Palm starts her investigation when a massive and ominous aura surrounds her.
108	33	"Gungi × of × Komugi"; Transliteration: "Komugi no Gungi" (Japanese: コムギ×ノ×グンギ)	Woo Seung-wook	Tsutomu Kamishiro	December 11, 2013	August 19, 2018
Gon and his friends make the final preparations for their assault on the palace. Meanwhile, the king is yet to defeat Komugi. When he decides to kill her, he ends up protecting her from an animal attack instead, for reasons that even he cannot explain.
109	34	"Taking Stock × and × Taking Action"; Transliteration: "Kōshin Kaishi de Kōdō Kaishi" (Japanese: コウシンカイシ×デ×コウドウカイシ)	Shinichirō Ushijima	Tsutomu Kamishiro	December 18, 2013	August 26, 2018
The time has come for Gon and his friends to infiltrate the palace and confront the Royal Guard, who are making preparations for the upcoming selection. As his concerns about Komugi increase, the king starts questioning his own existence and purpose.
110	35	"Confusion × and × Expectation"; Transliteration: "Konwaku to Omowaku" (Japanese: コンワク×ト×オモワク)	Masaki Matsumura	Tsutomu Kamishiro	December 25, 2013	September 9, 2018
The selection is at hand, but the king starts isolating himself from his servants, including the Royal Guard. Meanwhile, Gon's party is about to break into the palace.
111	36	"Charge × and × Invade"; Transliteration: "Totsunyū Shite Shinnyū" (Japanese: トツニュウ×シテ×シンニュウ)	Daisuke Yoshida	Tsutomu Kamishiro	January 8, 2014	September 16, 2018
The Hunters' assault on the royal palace begins. Gon and his friends break inside and come across Menthuthuyoupi, while Netero and Zeno strike from the sky. Neferpitou jumps up to confront them, just to be driven away when the chairman makes a small demonstration of his powers. Part of Netero's backstory is explained in the process.
112	37	"Monster × and × Monster"; Transliteration: "Kaibutsu to Kaibutsu" (Japanese: カイブツ×ト×カイブツ)	Aki Hayashi	Tsutomu Kamishiro	January 15, 2014	September 23, 2018
Gon's party confronts Youpi while Pouf and Pitou rush to the palace to assist the king, who is distraught with Komugi's condition, as she has been badly injured during the attack.
113	38	"An × Indebted × Insect"; Transliteration: "Mushi Dakedo Kashi" (Japanese: ムシ×ダケド×カシ)	Migmi	Shōji Yonemura	January 22, 2014	September 30, 2018
Shoot and Knuckle stay behind to fight Youpi while Morel rushes forward to face Pouf. While looking for Pitou, Killua briefly turns back to assist Ikalgo, unaware that he accidentally put his friend's cover at risk; Ikalgo had disguised himself as Flutter.
114	39	"Divide × and × Conquer"; Transliteration: "Bundan to Gosan" (Japanese: ブンダン×ト×ゴサン)	Junichi Fujise	Shōji Yonemura	January 29, 2014	October 7, 2018
Separated from the Royal Guard, the king departs from the palace with Netero to have their fight elsewhere. Gon, learning of Pitou's location, steels himself to confront it. Meanwhile, Pouf enters in a cocoon in preparation to confront Morel, and Shoot fights Youpi to the limit of his strength, until Knuckle steps in to protect him.
115	40	"Duty × and × Question"; Transliteration: "Gimu to Gimon" (Japanese: ギム×ト×ギモン)	Shinichirō Ushijima	Tsutomu Kamishiro	February 5, 2014	October 14, 2018
The disguised Ikalgo reaches the lower levels of the palace to look for Palm, unaware that he is being followed. Meanwhile, Meleoron leaves Knuckle's side and proceeds further into the palace, but another Chimera Ant, Welfin, tracks his smell. Elsewhere, Gon and Killua find Pitou, who is too busy to fight them while tending to Komugi's wounds.
116	41	"Revenge × and × Recovery"; Transliteration: "Fukushū to Shūfuku" (Japanese: フクシュウ×ト×シュウフク)	Masaki Matsumura	Tsutomu Kamishiro	February 12, 2014	October 21, 2018
Face to face with Pitou, Gon cannot hold back his rage and urges the Chimera Ant to fight him. Realizing that Pitou is defending Komugi, Killua attempts to calm his friend down, with no success. Gon gives Pitou an hour to treat Komugi in exchange of accompanying him to restore Kite's mind.
117	42	"Insult × and × Payback"; Transliteration: "Bujoku ni wa Setsujoku" (Japanese: ブジョク×ニハ×セツジョク)	Woo Seung-wook	Shōji Yonemura	February 19, 2014	October 28, 2018
Cheetu attempts to provoke Zeno into fighting him, but Silva appears to pick up his father, killing the ant instantly in the process. Separated from the others, Youpi realizes that he failed to prevent the intruders from approaching the king and attempts to vent out his anger on Knuckle and Shoot, creating an overwhelming explosion, a feat that surprises even himself. Knuckle believes this could prove itself as an opportunity to make a comeback, while Youpi plans to use it to defeat them for good.
118	43	"A × False × Rage"; Transliteration: "Itsuwari no Ikari" (Japanese: イツワリ×ノ×イカリ)	Aki Hayashi	Shōji Yonemura	February 26, 2014	November 4, 2018
Ikalgo infiltrates the palace's lower levels to look for Palm, with no success. While returning to the surface, his cover is blown and he finds himself trapped in the underground with an enemy. Meanwhile, Youpi pretends to be angered in order to have Knuckle falsely believe there is an opening for him to attack. Youpi's plan works, but just before he can kill his opponent, Killua paralyzes the ant with a lightning bolt and steps in to fight him.
119	44	"Strong × Or × Weak"; Transliteration: "Tsuyo ika Yowa ika" (Japanese: ツヨ×イカ×ヨワ×イカ)	Migmi	Tsutomu Kamishiro	March 5, 2014	November 11, 2018
Taking advantage of Youpi's distraction, Killua vents out his anger by beating him up, but is forced to flee after his lightning power runs out. Meanwhile, Ikalgo makes use of the underground security system to outsmart his pursuer and find a way to escape back to the surface. Morel, on the other hand, is in doubt about whether he should make the first move against Pouf or not.
120	45	"Fake × and × Real"; Transliteration: "Nisemono to Honmono" (Japanese: ニセモノ×ト×ホンモノ)	Daisuke Yoshida	Tsutomu Kamishiro	March 12, 2014	November 25, 2018
Morel decides to make the first move and unwillingly frees Pouf from his restraint. Upon realizing that Shoot is missing, unaware that he was extracted by Knov for medical treatment, Knuckle confronts Youpi. Morel assists him, despite his options being drastically reduced due to having his pipe stolen by Pouf. After realizing that the king is nowhere to be found, Pouf decides to rejoin Pitou, who is still working to stabilize Komugi under Gon's vigilant eyes.
121	46	"Defeat × and × Dignity"; Transliteration: "Haiboku to Menboku" (Japanese: ハイボク×ト×メンボク)	Junichi Fujise	Shōji Yonemura	March 19, 2014	December 2, 2018
Knuckle and Morel confront Youpi with their lives on the line, but just a few moments shy of neutralizing Youpi's Nen with his ability, Knuckle is forced to choose between abandoning Morel or giving up on the last chance they have to defeat him.
122	47	"Pose × and × Name"; Transliteration: "Tatemae to Namae" (Japanese: タテマエ×ト×ナマエ)	Shinichirō Ushijima	Shōji Yonemura	March 26, 2014	December 9, 2018
Far away from the palace, Netero prepares himself to confront the king, who much to his surprise, recognizes his value as a fighter and is not willing to kill him. Meanwhile, Pouf learns the situation from Pitou and sneaks past Gon's vigilance to rejoin Youpi as they leave the palace to search for the king.
123	48	"Centipede × and × Memory"; Transliteration: "Mukade to Omoide" (Japanese: ムカデ×ト×オモイデ)	Masaki Matsumura	Tsutomu Kamishiro	April 2, 2014	December 16, 2018
Ikalgo is attacked by Welfin, but the enemy's attempt to restrain him backfires and they find themselves in a standoff. Welfin regains some of his lost memories from when he was still human and gives Ikalgo a hint regarding Palm's location.
124	49	"Breakdown × and × Awakening"; Transliteration: "Kekkai to Kakusei" (Japanese: ケッカイ×ト×カクセイ)	Woo Seung-wook	Shōji Yonemura	April 9, 2014	January 6, 2019
Killua meets Palm and learns that she was transformed into a Chimera Ant. Refusing to let her see Gon in fear of what effects this could have on his already unstable mind, Killua is attacked by her, unaware that she is under Pouf's control.
125	50	"Great Power × and × Ultimate Power"; Transliteration: "Bu no Tsuyomi to Bu no Kiwami" (Japanese: ブノツヨミ×ト×ブノキワミ)	Aki Hayashi	Shōji Yonemura	April 16, 2014	January 13, 2019
Netero convinces the king to fight him by revealing that he will tell him his true name once defeated. The chairman then unleashes his most powerful technique. Despite striking the king countless times, Netero only manages to scratch him.
126	51	"Zero × and × Rose"; Transliteration: "Zero to Rōzu" (Japanese: ゼロ×ト×ローズ)	Migmi	Tsutomu Kamishiro	April 23, 2014	January 20, 2019
The king bypasses Netero's defenses and tears an arm and a leg from his body. Refusing to give up, the chairman focuses all his Nen into a final attack that also fails to defeat him. Having won the match, the king finally learns from Netero his true name—Meruem—just before Netero commits suicide to trigger a weapon of mass destruction known as the Miniature Rose. Stored inside his own body as a dead man's switch, it is Netero's last attempt to destroy Meruem.
127	52	"Hostility × and × Determination"; Transliteration: "Tekii to Ketsui" (Japanese: テキイ×ト×ケツイ)	Junichi Fujise	Tsutomu Kamishiro	April 30, 2014	January 27, 2019
Pitou completes Komugi's treatment and Gon forces them to accompany him to Peijing in order to restore Kite's mind, leaving Komugi with Killua and the others as their hostage. Meanwhile, fearing the worst upon seeing the explosion, Pouf and Youpi reach the site of Netero's battle with Meruem and cannot hide their feelings of sadness upon finding their king's maimed body.
128	53	"Unparalleled Joy × and × Unconditional Love"; Transliteration: "Mujō no Yorokobi to Mushō no Ai" (Japanese: ムジョウノヨロコビ×ト×ムショウノアイ)	Daisuke Yoshida	Shōji Yonemura	May 7, 2014	February 3, 2019
Upon realizing Meruem is barely alive, Pouf and Youpi offer their own flesh to heal him in a euphoric experience and realization of performing their duty. Though a fully healed Meruem has become stronger than before, with Pouf and a miniaturized Youpi having an empathic link to him, the Chimera Ant is suffering memory loss. Pouf decides to take advantage of the situation by sending his clone back the palace to kill off Komugi before Meruem remembers her, only to be hit by Knuckle's attack. Palm uses her own Hatsu to reveal Meruem is still alive.
129	54	"Formidable Enemy × and × Clear Objective"; Transliteration: "Hyōteki to Mokuteki" (Japanese: ヒョウテキ×ト×モクテキ)	Shinichirō Ushijima	Shōji Yonemura	May 14, 2014	February 10, 2019
As Meruem approaches the palace, Pouf's clone continues searching for Komugi before finding her under Killua's guard. With Killua too fast to catch, Pouf's clone resolves to talk Komugi into struggling with Killua to give an opening to kill her. But Killua realizes this and successfully protects her from the clone before he leaves, as Pouf realizes the Gungi board and pieces are still on the palace grounds. Meanwhile, Gon and Pitou are about to reach Kite's location.
130	55	"Magic × of × Despair"; Transliteration: "Mahou de Zetsubou" (Japanese: マホウ×デ×ゼツボウ)	Woo Seung-wook	Tsutomu Kamishiro	May 21, 2014	February 17, 2019
As Meruem returns to the palace, the remaining Hunters conceal their presence while Palm explains the nature of her altered Hatsu to Killua. It allows her to observe three people at a time: currently Pouf's core, Gon, and Killua. Pouf overhears this and takes advantage by having Welfin call Pitou to inform them that Komugi is safe, removing Gon's leverage. Once brought before Kite with Gon demanding him to be healed, Pitou reveals that Kite died the night they fought and that the Chimera Ant's Nen can only preserve and reanimate corpses. Gon breaks down while Pitou uses Doctor Blythe to heal their arm, as Palm alerts Killua to the turn of events.
131	56	"Anger × and × Light"; Transliteration: "Ikari to Hikari" (Japanese: イカリ×ト×ヒカリ)	Masaki Matsumura	Tsutomu Kamishiro	May 28, 2014	February 24, 2019
Having fully healed their arm, Pitou gives Gon their condolences before expressing their intent to kill him for the King. But Gon, willing to sacrifice everything to avenge Kite, assumes an adult-like form to fight Pitou, who realizes the boy is using up all of his potential as a Nen user to kill them at the cost of his own life. Upon learning that his friend is in a predicament, Killua rushes to his aid, arriving just to see a hopeless Gon utterly destroying Pitou's head. Their body then reanimates and rips his arm off. Gon finishes off Pitou before seemingly dying in a Nen explosion.
132	57	"Flash × and × Trigger"; Transliteration: "Senkou to Hatsudou" (Japanese: センコウ×ト×ハツドウ)	Aki Hayashi	Shōji Yonemura	June 4, 2014	March 3, 2019
Reaching the center of the palace, Meruem attempts to remember Komugi while Pouf and Youpi struggle to prevent him from remembering, as the king remembered Pitou upon hearing their name. Meruem then displays his new power by using his En to detect the intruders, intercepting Knuckle and Meleoron as they fled and bringing their unconscious bodies into the palace within seconds. While Palm and Ikalgo take Komugi with them to Bizeff's underground bunker, Pouf convinces Meruem to make a game where he and Youpi find Pitou before the king finds the other intruders. Required to use En only once as a handicap, knowing the two are still hiding something from him, Meruem accepts the challenge on the condition that his subordinates must reveal their secret if he wins. He also gives Pouf time to commence the selection process. Instructing Youpi to hide himself and wait for Pitou, having used up six-sevenths of his cells to heal the king, Pouf reforms his body to commence the selection.
133	58	"Deadline × to × Live"; Transliteration: "Seizon no Kigen" (Japanese: セイゾン×ノ×キゲン)	Migmi	Shōji Yonemura	June 11, 2014	March 10, 2019
Ikalgo and Palm send Welfin to set up a hostage exchange with Mereum for their friends, Ikalgo calling Welfin by his original name while revealing they and Bloster were originally Gyro's subordinates. Ikalgo also reveals to Welfin that he believes Gyro is reborn as a Chimera Ant. Welfin meets Youpi and relays the message, only to decide to interrogate the Royal Guard after learning he has no memory of being human. Having finally finished the selection, Pouf realizes something is wrong, as Pitou's corpse puppets have ceased functioning. Pouf finds Youpi dead and flies to alert Meruem. Meruem, having regained some memory from both the word "game" and a Gungi King piece Pouf missed, deems the Royal Guard has forfeited and demands answers. Meanwhile, noting their questionable methods are proof of their humanity, Palm and Ikalgo hide Komugi in a safe place as the former reveals to Ikalgo that they are stalling for time, as Meruem is slowly dying of radiation poisoning from being exposed to the Miniature Rose.
134	59	"The Word × is × That Person"; Transliteration: "Hito Koto wa Sono Hito" (Japanese: ヒトコト×ハ×ソノヒト)	Daisuke Yoshida	Tsutomu Kamishiro	June 18, 2014	March 17, 2019
A distressed Pouf, unaware that he and Youpi have been poisoned from being around the king, watches Meruem find a formerly confident Welfin with his En and inquires of Youpi's death. Revealed to have acquired and magnified Pouf's Hatsu when he senses Welfin's resentment towards him, Meruem is driven into a bloodlust by Pouf's continued meddling, sparing the insane loyalist before refocusing on Welfin. Severely aged out of intense fear, Welfin eventually whimpers out Komugi's name, with Meruem calming down once remembering her. Meruem instructs a defeated Pouf to find Pitou and release their prisoners while he proceeds to the underground bunker, telling a defiant Welfin to find Gyro and live as a human.
135	60	"This Person × and × This Moment"; Transliteration: "Kono hi to Kono shunkan" (Japanese: コノヒ×ト×コノシュンカン)	Junichi Fujise	Tsutomu Kamishiro	June 25, 2014	March 24, 2019
Now knowing that he is directly poisoned by the Miniature Rose, Pouf having already died from exposure, Meruem accepts his defeat and convinces Palm to divulge Komugi's location to spend his final moments playing with her. Though Komugi understands that she will also die if she stays with him, Komugi remains by Meruem's side to the very end. Sometime after, with the public kept in the dark as to what truly occurred at East Gorteau and the NGL, Beans releases Netero's retirement video. The Hunter Association accordingly begins preparations to select a new chairman to succeed Netero.
136	61	"Homecoming × and × Real Name"; Transliteration: "Kikyō to Honmyō" (Japanese: キキョウ×ト×ホンミョウ)	Shinichirō Ushijima	Shōji Yonemura	July 2, 2014	March 31, 2019
Sometime after Meruem's death, the incident at East Gorteau is labeled a genocide-suicide. The leaderless country is governed by the other three nations in the Mitene Union, while the NGL is made into a nature reserve under the Hunter Association's jurisdiction. The surviving Chimera Ants move on with their lives, with Welfin and Hina leaving for Meteor City with Bizeff to find Gyro. Bloster remains in the NGL with Shidore as they arrive at Haruna's village, Haruna recognizing Shidore as Reina. Morel receives a call from Colt with a startling revelation about the Queen's last child. Gon is at death's door since his battle with Neferpitou. Killua departs the hospital with a plan to save Gon's life, advising Knov to assemble the doctors for the surgery. At the same time, the Zodiacs, the top members of the Hunter Association (including Ging), assemble to organize the election to choose the next president per Netero's final message.

=== Election arc (2014) ===
No. overall	No. in arc	Title	Directed by	Written by	Original release date	English air date
137	1	"Debate × Among × Zodiacs"; Transliteration: "Jyunishin de Giron" (Japanese: ジュウニシン×デ×ギロン)	Woo Seung-wook	Shōji Yonemura	July 9, 2014	April 7, 2019
The Zodiacs, the twelve top-ranking members of the Hunter Association, have gathered to elect a new chairman. Vice chairman Pariston Hill, code-named "Rat", is the last to arrive. He nominates himself to become chairman, with the others voicing against it due to rumors about him. Ging, code-named "Boar", also nominates himself to carry out Netero's will. When Pariston suggests reevaluating the election process, Cheadle Yorkshire, code-named "Dog", suggests drawing lots to decide the rules. But Ging, having arrived at the Hunter Association building days prior, conspired with Beans to help him rig the drawing so they would follow his rules. On August 8th, the first round of the 13th Hunter Chairman Election commences with numerous Hunters in attendance. Hisoka is also there, though merely to rate the hunters present, before being approached by Illumi in his Gittarackur disguise. As the first round of voting ends with no winner decided, Illumi informs Hisoka about Gon's condition and requests his help to save Killua, revealing a fifth Zoldyck sibling that he wants to get rid of.
138	2	"Plea × and × Favor"; Transliteration: "Onedari to Onegai" (Japanese: オネダリ×ト×オネガイ)	Masaki Matsumura	Tsutomu Kamishiro	July 16, 2014	April 14, 2019
Following the first election's stalemate, Pariston makes two propositions to resolve the impasse, despite the other Zodiacs knowing he is securing his own win. Meanwhile, Killua returns home to the Zoldyck estate and requests to see his younger sibling Alluka who could save Gon. Silva decides to take Killua to the vault Alluka is kept in after being reminded of his son's promise to never betray his friend. Silva has Killua enter the vault after having him recite the rules of Alluka's ability: granting a wish to whoever fulfills her three requests, while those who fail four times are instantly killed alongside their loved one. The deaths extend to those the victim spent the most time with, should a wish be vast enough for Alluka's requests to become more difficult to fulfill.
139	3	"Alluka × and × That Thing"; Transliteration: "Alluka to Nanika" (Japanese: アルカ×ト×ナニカ)	Aki Hayashi	Tsutomu Kamishiro	July 23, 2014	April 21, 2019
Killua reunites with Alluka and uses her as leverage for them to be allowed to leave the Zoldyck estate, as her powers can only be used to heal Gon if she is close to him. Meanwhile, Illumi enlists Hisoka's help to kill Alluka, as he fears Killua's failure will kill the entire Zoldyck family along with anyone else Killua had been in contact with. At the same time, the second round of elections has yet to reach a conclusion, with the Zodiacs arguing about a possible way to bring it to an end.
140	4	"Join Battle × and × Open Battle"; Transliteration: "Sansen to Kaisen" (Japanese: サンセン×ト×カイセン)	Migmi	Shōji Yonemura	July 30, 2014	April 28, 2019
Killua is allowed by his family to leave the Zoldyck estate with Alluka, whose Threat 4 status requires the supervision of several butlers who are instructed to bring her and Killua back home if the latter ever leaves Alluka's side or allows any of their secrets to be leaked. Besides Gotoh and Canary, Killua finds himself being supervised by Tsubone and her granddaughter Amane. Alluka then suddenly asks for Tsubone's pinky fingernail, Tsubone gladly doing so before concealing herself so Alluka cannot make any more requests. Meanwhile, after he and Morel are given instructions, Leorio confronts Ging over not visiting Gon at the hospital, punching him through his Nen ability in the middle of the election's fourth round.
141	5	"Magician × and × Butler"; Transliteration: "Tejinashi to Shitsuji" (Japanese: テジナシ×ト×シツジ)	Daisuke Yoshida	Shōji Yonemura	August 6, 2014	May 5, 2019
The fourth round of the election concludes with Leorio in 3rd place after his confrontation with Ging earns him the respect of his fellow Hunters. Meanwhile, with Gotoh and Canary being subtle supporters, Killua receives a call from Illumi and deduces he intends to kill Alluka. After Illumi confirms his intent, he proceeds to use drivers under his control to knock Killua's car off the cliff. While given the task to dispatch the butlers, Hisoka has his own plans, as he provokes Illumi into releasing his bloodlust, which allows Killua to pinpoint their location. After seeing Amane could not be trusted, Killua assumes Godspeed to spirit Alluka away while the butlers encounter Hisoka. Gotoh deflects the killer's cards with his coins, ordering the female servants to go after Killua and let him handle Hisoka alone.
142	6	"Needle × and × Debt"; Transliteration: "Hari x to x Kari" (Japanese: ハリ×ト×カリ)	Junichi Fujise	Tsutomu Kamishiro	August 13, 2014	May 12, 2019
After Canary and Amane leave, Gotoh battles Hisoka, but is eventually outwitted and has his throat slit by the magician. As Killua makes his way to Parasta City, being amazed by his quick growth, Tsubone calls Amane and Canary to her location and transforms into a motorcycle powered by the two young servants' aura. The three quickly catch up with Killua, but he eludes them by running off the paved road into a forest. The servants conclude that Killua's destination is the airport, making the arrangements to prepare decoy ships to trick Illumi before he eludes Amane and Canary. Illumi and Hisoka arrive by the airport in a car after Killua's airship has taken off, the former deciding to convert civilians into Needle People to intercept the airships. Killua deduced this while contacting Morel, arranging for his brother to be captured by the Anti-Netero Faction, whose leader Teradein is one of the remaining top eight candidates for chairman.
143	7	"Sin × and × Claw"; Transliteration: "Tsumi to Tsume" (Japanese: ツミ×ト×ツメ)	Shinichirō Ushijima	Tsutomu Kamishiro	August 20, 2014	May 19, 2019
The Anti-Netero Faction proceeds to hunt down Illumi, only for Bushidora and the Hunters they sent after them to all be killed by Hisoka. Meanwhile, with Tsubone following after his airship as a glider powered by Amane's aura, Killua contacts Canary to have cars sent to three locations, as well as near the hospital where Gon is. Killua meets up with Hishita, only to learn he fell into Illumi's trap, with Tsubone realizing that Illumi tracked them by hacking into her monocle's video feed to the Zoldyck Estate. Illumi demands Killua to reveal the secrets he is hiding regarding Alluka's powers. Alluka requests Tsubone's middle and ring fingernails, which she gladly gives, and Nanika emerges. Killua uses his wish to heal Tsubone's left hand, after which Alluka loses consciousness. Killua explains that Nanika must make physical contact to heal and that there are no resulting backlashes. Killua then warns Illumi that he will show no mercy if he harms Alluka. Illumi takes his leave, knowing Killua is still hiding something. Meanwhile, Hisoka assassinates Teradein when he announced his intent to expose Illumi.
144	8	"Approval × and × Coalition"; Transliteration: "Kessai to Kassai" (Japanese: ケッサイ×ト×カッサイ)	Woo Seung-wook	Shōji Yonemura	August 27, 2014	May 26, 2019
Only Leorio, Cheadle, Pariston, and Mizaistom remain. Before the 8th round commences, with everyone unable to leave until a winner is decided, Ging explains to Cheadle that Pariston has no intention of winning or losing, also revealing that Pariston acquired the cocooned human-Chimera Ants. As the round commences, Mizaistom steps down in favor of Cheadle, who does the same for Leorio to thwart Pariston. Taking the stand, Leorio expresses his intent to force all present to find a means to save Gon. Meanwhile, Killua reaches the hospital with Alluka and reaches Gon's room.
145	9	"Defeat × and × Reunion"; Transliteration: "Kanpai to Saikai" (Japanese: カンパイ×ト×サイカイ)	Masaki Matsumura	Tsutomu Kamishiro	September 3, 2014	June 2, 2019
Killua convinces an awakened Alluka to let Nanika take over her body to cure Gon, Illumi watching from afar with the intent of taking that power for himself. Taking the resulting rumble as a cue after only he and Leorio remain in the election's 9th round, Pariston purposely stalls for time until a tearful Morel arrives with a fully healed Gon. Cheadle realizes that this cements Pariston's victory. Surrounded by his friends and the other Hunters who celebrate his recovery, Gon sees Dwun and List as they point him to a still seated Ging.
146	10	"Chairman × and × Release"; Transliteration: "Kaichō to Hōshutsu" (Japanese: カイチョウ×ト×ホウシュツ)	Aki Hayashi	Tsutomu Kamishiro	September 10, 2014	June 9, 2019
As Gon tearfully reunites with his father and expresses his regret of not helping Kite, Ging calms his son down and urges him to apologize to Kite while dealing with the audience members chiding him on being a lousy dad. Gon takes his leave after placing his vote for Pariston, who unexpectedly resigns after naming Cheadle his Vice-Chairman and successor. When Cheadle confronts Pariston soon after, he laments over wanting to play a little more with Netero while telling her to reform the 10 Commandments and the Hunter Exam. Meanwhile, asking Tsubone and Amane to leave them, Killua waits out Illumi, who deduced that only Killua can order Nanika. Killua has Nanika teleport Illumi back to the Zoldyck estate, commanding her to never awaken again so Alluka can live a normal life. He changes his mind after Alluka convinces him to apologize to Nanika and protect her, giving Nanika the command to not grant any more wishes instead. An emotional Tsubone observes the scene from afar while informed by Kikyo that the Threat Level has been removed.
147	11	"Salvation × and × Future"; Transliteration: "Sukui to Mirai" (Japanese: スクイ×ト×ミライ)	Migmi	Tsutomu Kamishiro	September 17, 2014	June 16, 2019
As she takes in Koala, repentant for his actions both as a hitman in his previous life and as a Chimera Ant, Kite is revealed to have reincarnated as the Chimera Ant Queen that Colt had been caring for following the Queen's death. Kite tells Gon that he does not need to blame himself for her current condition before suggesting that he meet Ging, who promised to wait for him at the Hunter Association building. But once Gon arrives, Beans apologizes for failing to stop Ging, who left a letter for Gon to meet him at the top of the World Tree. Gon, Killua and Alluka reach the town near the World Tree, where Gon and Killua part ways as they promise to meet again someday.
148	12	"Past × and × Future"; Transliteration: "Koremade to Korekara" (Japanese: コレマデ×ト×コレカラ)	Daisuke Yoshida	Tsutomu Kamishiro	September 24, 2014	June 23, 2019
Gon climbs to the top of the World Tree where Ging is expecting him, and the two finally have a heart to heart. Ging tells Gon of his early days as a Hunter, explaining his motivation of getting what he does not have. Revealing the World Tree is actually a sapling, Ging explains his intent to see the world outside their current map, which the Chimera Ants might have originated from, while content to bide his time until he has the requirements to proceed. Gon then gives Ging back the Hunter License he loaned to Kite, before telling him of all his adventures and the friends he made along the way. Mito receives a letter from Gon, the Zoldyck Family hires a Kiriko to assume Gotoh's identity, and Knov & Morel make a toast in Netero's memory. Gon returns to Kite's group and sends recordings of the Small-billed Swans to his friends while Kurapika is giving last rites to the retrieved eyes of his kinmen.
