= Hunter × Hunter (2011 TV series) =

Anime television series

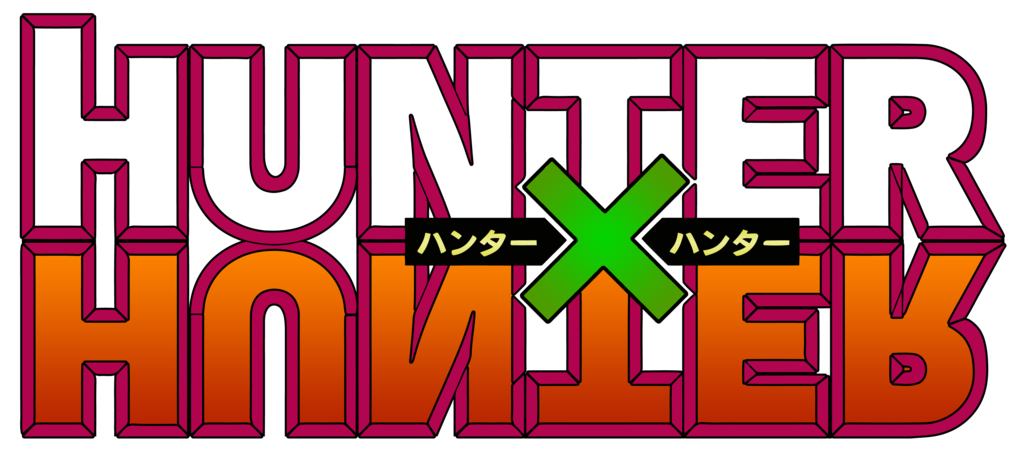
- Type: TV series
- Based on: Hunter × Hunter
- Created by: Yoshihiro Togashi
- Directed by: Hiroshi Kōjina
- Series composition: Atsushi Maekawa (1–58); Tsutomu Kamishiro (39–148)
- Character designers: Takahiro Yoshimatsu (Note: Credited for Character Design (キャラクターデザイン) until Episode 87 and for Main Character Design (メインキャラクターデザイン) from Episode 88); Indori Bokujō (88–148)
- Music by: Yoshihisa Hirano
- No. of episodes: 148 (list of episodes)

Production
- Art director: Mio Isshiki
- Sound director: Tomoaki Yamada
- Cinematographers: Kazuya Arahata (1–41); Hironobu Hatanaka (42–75); Hiroshi Inoue (76–148)
- Color designer: Yoshinori Horikawa
- Editor: Satoshi Terauchi
- Animation producer: Keiji Mita
- Studio: Madhouse
- Producers: Toshio Nakatani; Naoki Iwasa (1–58); Tomoko Yoshino (1–75); Tetsuto Motoyasu (1–87); Akira Shinohara (1–99); Manabu Tamura (1–123); Atsushi Kirimoto (59–148); Hiroyuki Okino (88–100); Kenichi Sakurai (100–148); Ai Morikawa (124–148)
- Production companies: Nippon Television; VAP; Shueisha (1–100); Madhouse
- Runtime: 23 minutes

Original release
- Network: NNS (NTV)
- Release: October 2, 2011 – September 24, 2014

Related
- Anime films
- Hunter × Hunter: Phantom Rouge (2013); Hunter × Hunter: The Last Mission (2013)

Hunter × Hunter is a Japanese anime television series, based on Yoshihiro Togashi's manga series Hunter × Hunter. It was produced by Madhouse and directed by Hiroshi Kōjina, and was broadcast for 148 episodes on Nippon Television from October 2011 to September 2014. The story begins with a young boy named Gon Freecss, who one day discovers that the father who he thought was dead is, in fact, alive and well. He learns that his father, Ging, is a legendary "Hunter", an individual who has proven themselves an elite member of humanity. Despite the fact that Ging left his son with his relatives in order to pursue his own dreams, Gon becomes determined to follow in his father's footsteps, pass the rigorous "Hunter Examination", and eventually find his father to become a Hunter in his own right.

== Plot ==
Gon Freecss, a 12-year old boy, leaves his quiet life on Whale Island to become a professional "Hunter", an elite, licensed adventurer, to find his estranged father, Ging. Along the way, Gon befriends Killua, Kurapika, and Leorio while navigating the deadly Hunter Exam, learning the "Nen" power system, and undertaking dangerous quests.

== Release ==
The second anime television series adaptation of Hunter × Hunter was announced on July 24, 2011. It is a complete reboot starting from the beginning of the original manga, with no connection to the first anime television series from 1999. Produced by Nippon Television, VAP, Shueisha, and Madhouse, the series is directed by Hiroshi Kōjina, with Atsushi Maekawa and Tsutomu Kamishiro handling series composition, Takahiro Yoshimatsu designing the characters and Yoshihisa Hirano composing the music. Instead of having the old cast reprise their roles for the new adaptation, the series features an entirely new cast to voice the characters. The series began airing Sunday mornings on Nippon TV starting October 2, 2011. It switched to airing at 1:29 am on Tuesday nights from October 8, 2013, onwards. The series ended on September 23, 2014, after 148 episodes.

An hour after each episode aired in Japan, American website Crunchyroll provided English subtitled simulcasts in the United States, Canada, the United Kingdom, Ireland, South Africa, Australia, and New Zealand. The series began airing on Animax Asia on April 24, 2012. On October 9, 2015, Viz Media announced their license to the series at their panel at New York Comic Con. They eventually released the anime on DVD/Blu-ray with an English dub. On April 1, 2016, it was announced that the series would premiere on Adult Swim's Toonami programming block, which began airing on April 17, 2016. Madman Entertainment acquired the series for distribution in Australia and New Zealand, and made the series available on AnimeLab. Funimation began streaming the series in the United Kingdom and Ireland on July 17, 2020.

== Music ==
The background music and soundtrack for the series was composed by Yoshihisa Hirano. The series's opening theme is alternated between the song "Departure!" and an alternate version titled "Departure! -Second Version-", both performed by Masatoshi Ono. Five pieces of music were used as the ending theme; "Just Awake", performed by the band Fear, and Loathing in Las Vegas (episodes 1–26); "Hunting for Your Dream", performed by Galneryus (episodes 27–58); "Reason", performed by the duo Yuzu (episodes 59–75); "Nagareboshi Kirari" (流れ星☆キラリ; lit. 'A Sparkling Shooting Star'), performed by Yuzu (episodes 76–98); and "Hyōri Ittai" (表裏一体; lit. 'Two Sides of the Same Coin'), also performed by Yuzu (episodes 99–146).

== Episodes ==
| Arc | Episodes | Originally released | |
| Arc | Episodes | First released | Last released |
|---|---|---|---|
| Hunter Exam | 26 | October 2, 2011 | April 8, 2012 |
| Heavens Arena | 12 | April 15, 2012 | July 8, 2012 |
| Phantom Troupe (Note: Also referred to as the Yorknew City arc.) | 20 | July 15, 2012 | December 9, 2012 |
| Greed Island | 17 | December 16, 2012 | April 14, 2013 |
| Chimera Ant | 61 | April 21, 2013 | July 2, 2014 |
| Election (Note: Also referred to as the 13th Hunter Chairman Election arc.) | 12 | July 9, 2014 | September 24, 2014 |

== Reception ==
The 2011 anime series adaptation was met with near-universal critical acclaim. Adrian Marcano from Inverse considered the 2011 series to be one of the greatest anime series ever. He said that the anime set itself apart with one of the greatest story arcs in anime history, in which the villain, not the hero, takes the anime to instant classic status. He also said that, "It is in the 2011 version where we see probably one of the best story arcs in anime history: the Chimera Ant Arc." Nick Creamer held similar sentiments, writing "the show's fantastic aesthetics elevate it above almost everything out there – in direction, in sound design, in pacing, in animation, in basically every relevant aesthetic metric, Hunter x Hunter triumphs. That it's been maintaining this level of quality for well over a hundred episodes is nothing short of astonishing."

In 2019, Polygon named the series as one of the best anime of the 2010s, and Crunchyroll ranked it as one of the 25 best anime of the 2010s. IGN also listed the Hunter × Hunter 2011 adaptation among the best anime series of the 2010s.
