= Last Inning =

Japanese manga series

- The cover to Last Inning volume 1

ラストイニング (Rasutoiningu)
- Genre: Sports
- Manga
- Written by: Ryu Kamio
- Published by: Shogakukan
- Magazine: Big Comic Spirits
- Original run: 2004 – 2014
- Volumes: 44

Last Inning (ラストイニング, Rasutoiningu) is a baseball manga written by Ryu Kamio, supervised by Kiyosi Kato and illustrated by Yu Nakahara.

== Plot ==
Saitama High School went to the first round of the Koshien 36 years ago. However, after that they did not manage to win any. Keisuke Hatogaya one of the members of the team 23 years after going to the Koshien punched the Umpire for making an unfair call because he was trying to make high school baseball like he wanted. 13 years later Keisuke is a sly and successful businessman. After making a big sale he got promoted but within moments of getting promoted he was placed under arrest for disobeying pharmaceutical laws. He was arrested because he was placed in charge to be framed by the boss. After spending some time in jail he gets a visitor who turned out to be the coach of the baseball team he was in 13 years ago. The coach was then the principal of Saitama High School. He offered to pay for Keisuke's bail if he became a coach for the Saitama baseball team. Keisuke resented it for a little but then eventually gave in. The baseball team was completely average. Keisuke began to train them until a woman came by and told them that the baseball club was shut down at that school for it did not have any value. However Keisuke obtained an extension on the fall of the club saying that he didn't get the team to Koshien next summer that it would be disbanded. Now with almost a whole year to train the students Keisuke works hard to train these students in his odd but effective methods so that they may reach the Koshien.

== Characters ==
Keisuke Hatogaya (鳩ヶ谷圭輔)
He is ambitious, capable, and charismatic. Victimized by the treachery and deceit of those closest to him, a now wary Keisuke doesn't begin to shine until he steps onto the field. Using the treachery and deceit skills he learned in his career pitching shady pharmaceuticals, Keisuke aims to lead his team to the championships by hook or by crook. His nickname is Poppo.
Yutaka Moroyama (毛呂山豊)
The origin of his name is Moroyama, Saitama. Baseball coach of Saigaku 23 years ago and currently a school principal. He is the one who bails and recruits Keisuke Hatogaya to coach for current Saigaku High baseball team.
Yuriko Misato (美里ゆり子)
She works for the school board, and supervises the baseball team. The local beauty.
Naoya Hidaka (日高直哉)
The origin of his name is Hidaka, Saitama. He dreams of being a professional ballplayer and making a name for himself. He is a pitcher who throws right-handed. He has noticeable ego and excellent pitching skill.
Sota Yashio (八潮創太)
He is the catcher of the team. He possesses a cunning streak and knowledge of baseball which he uses to subtly or not subtly help his teammates.
Touru Kamifukuoka (上福岡徹)
The origin of his name was Kamihukuoka, Saitama.
Tomohiko Kawaguti (川口智彦)
Katutomo Oi (大井克豊)
A second baseman who bats and throws right-handed.
Masasi Iwatuki (岩槻雅司)
A tenth grader who plays as an outfielder. Masasi bats and throws right-handed.

=== Parents' Association ===
Omiya (大宮)

=== Others ===
Kiryu (桐生, Kiryū)
Shinnosuke Akeshi (明石慎之助)
Koichi Warabi (蕨耕一)
Natsuko Hiki (比企夏子)
Tsurugashima (鶴ヶ島)
Juzo Momotani (桃谷十三)

== Reception ==
Volume 21 reached the 25th place on the weekly Japanese manga charts, with 29,846 copies; volume 22 reached the 28th place, with 22,763 copies; volume 28 reached the 30th place, with 37,129 copies; volume 32 reached the 18th place, with 32,591 copies; volume 35 reached the 32nd place, with 29,893 copies; volume 36 reached the 18th place, with 27,367 copies; volume 37 reached the 50th place, with 30,915 copies; volume 39 reached the 47 place, with 26,791 copies; volume 40 reached the 34th place, with 25,312 copies; volume 44 reached the 28th place, with 25,045 copies.
