= Atsushi Maekawa =

Japanese screenwriter

Atsushi Maekawa (Japanese: 前川 淳, Hepburn: Maekawa Atsushi, born July 7, 1964) is a Japanese anime and tokusatsu scriptwriter, best known for his work in Dragon Ball Z and Dragon Ball GT and for being the father of anime voice actress Ryōko Maekawa.

== Works ==
=== Anime series ===
Anime Title	Year	Role	Notes	References
A Journey Through Another World: Raising Kids While Adventuring	2024	Series composition, screenplay	Screenplay for 7 episodes	
Afterschool Dice Club	2019	Series composition, screenplay	Screenplay for 5 episodes	
Mr. Tonegawa: Middle Management Blues	2018	Screenplay	Screenplay for 7 episodes	
Yu-Gi-Oh! VRAINS	2017–2019	Screenplay	Screenplay for 24 episodes	
Yu-Gi-Oh! ARC-V	2016–2017	Screenplay	Screenplay for 14 episodes	
Ultimate Otaku Teacher	2015	Series composition, screenplay	Screenplay for 13 episodes	
Turning Mecard	2015–2016	Story composition, screenplay	South Korean-Japanese aeni/anime, screenplay for 26 episodes	
Dragon Collection	2014–2015	Screenplay	Screenplay for 10 episodes	
Meganebu!	2013	Screenplay	Screenplay for 3 episodes	
Hunter x Hunter (2011)	2011–2013	Series composition (episodes 1–58), screenplay	The series composition role is shared with Tsutomu Kamishiro in episodes 39–58, screenplay for 11 episodes	
Bakugan Battle Brawlers: Mechtanium Surge	2011–2012	Screenplay		
Bakugan Battle Brawlers: Gundalian Invaders	2010–2011	Series composition, screenplay	Screenplay for 18 episodes	
Jewelpet	2009–2010	Series composition, screenplay	Screenplay for 14 episodes	
Bakugan Battle Brawlers: New Vestroia	2009–2010	Series composition, screenplay	Screenplay for 14 episodes	
Fresh Pretty Cure!	2009–2010	Series composition, screenplay	Screenplay for 11 episodes	
Dinosaur King: Season 2	2008	Screenplay	Screenplay for 7 episodes	
Sisters of Wellber Zwei	2008	Series composition, screenplay	Screenplay for 6 episodes	
Dragonaut: The Resonance	2007–2008	Story concept (episodes 1–17), screenplay	Screenplay for 13 episodes	
Bakugan Battle Brawlers	2007–2008	Series composition, screenplay	Screenplay for 20 episodes	
Sisters of Wellber	2007	Series composition, screenplay	Screenplay for 10 episodes	
Dinosaur King	2007–2008	Screenplay	Screenplay for 5 episodes	
Onegai My Melody: Kurukuru Shuffle!	2006–2007	Screenplay	Screenplay for 9 episodes	
Eyeshield 21	2006–2007	Screenplay	Screenplay for 12 episodes	
Capeta	2006	Screenplay	Screenplay for 9 episodes	
Yu-Gi-Oh!: Duel Monsters GX	2004–2005	Screenplay	Screenplay for 5 episodes	
Shadow Star	2003	Screenplay	Screenplay for 2 episodes	
Prince of Tennis	2003–2005	Series composition (episodes 102–178), screenplay	Screenplay for 26 episodes	
GetBackers	2002–2003	Screenplay	Screenplay for 4 episodes	
Bomberman Jetters	2002–2003	Series composition, screenplay	Screenplay for 21 episodes	
Yu-Gi-Oh!: Duel Monsters	2001–2004	Series composition (episodes 122–144), screenplay	Screenplay for 37 episodes	
Digimon Tamers	2001–2002	Screenplay	Screenplay for 11 episodes	
Ask Dr. Rin!	2001–2002	Series composition, screenplay	Screenplay for 15 episodes	
Medarot	2000–2001	Screenplay	Screenplay for 12 episodes	
Digimon Adventure 02	2000–2001	Series composition, screenplay	The series composition role is shared with Genki Yoshimura, screenplay for 11 episodes	
Ojamajo Doremi	1999–2000	Screenplay	Screenplay for 5 episodes	
Digimon Adventure	1999–2000	Screenplay	Screenplay for 9 episodes	
Dr. Slump	1997–1999	Screenplay	Screenplay for 28 episodes	
Sailor Moon Sailor Stars	1996–1997	Screenplay	Screenplay for 5 episodes	
Dragon Ball GT	1996–1997	Screenplay	Screenplay for 28 episodes	
Dragon Ball Z	1995–1996	Screenplay	Screenplay for 13 episodes	

=== OVA ===
Anime Title	Year	Role	Notes
Air Gear: Kuro no Hane to Nemuri no Mori - Break on the Sky	2010–2011	Screenplay	Screenplay for 3 episodes
Dragon Ball GT: A Hero's Legacy	1997	Screenplay	

=== Anime movies ===
Anime Title	Year	Role	Notes
Lupin III vs. Detective Conan: The Movie	2013	Screenplay	
Eiga Furesshu Purikyua! Omocha no Kuni wa himitsu ga ippai!?	2009	Screenplay	
Lupin III: Angel Tactics	2005	Screenplay	
The Prince of Tennis: Two Samurais, the First Game	2005	Screenplay	
Digimon Adventure 3D: Digimon Grand Prix!	2000	Screenplay	

=== TV Tokusatsu ===
Anime Title	Year	Role	Notes
Mahou Sentai Magiranger	2005	Main writer, screenplay	Screenplay for 13 episodes
Bakuryuu Sentai Abaranger	2003–2004	Screenplay	Screenplay for 8 episodes
Ninpuu Sentai Hurricaneger	2002–2003	Screenplay	Screenplay for 9 episodes
Ultraman Cosmos	2002	Screenplay	Screenplay for 2 episodes
Rosetta: The Masked Angel	1998	Screenplay	Screenplay for 2 episodes

=== Songwriter ===
For the anime series Ultimate Otaku Teacher, he wrote the lyrics for the songs composed by Ryuuichi Takada:

- Futari - sung by Satsumi Matsuda
- Itoshi no Shy Boy - sung by Satsumi Matsuda
- Kazoku no Kizuna da Familia - sung by Satsumi Matsuda
- Kazoku no Kizuna da Familia - sung by Risae Matsuda
- Maid no Hinkaku - sung by Azusa Tadokoro
- Metal Beast Rockunger! - sung by Shiina Natsukawa
- Yume Miru Two Hand - sung by Sora Amamiya

=== Other Works ===
- Shousetsu Fresh Precure! (2016) - Story
- Assassin's Labyrinth (2022–2024) - Story
