= Tsutomu Kamishiro =

Japanese anime and tokusatsu drama screenwriter

- 上代 務
- Born: Tsutomu Kamishiro; February 18, 1965 (age 61); Mobara, Chiba Prefecture, Japan
- Occupations: Screenwriter, Manga author
- Writing career
- Pen name: Ryu Kamio

Tsutomu Kamishiro (上代 務, Kamishiro Tsutomu; born February 18, 1965) is a Japanese anime screenwriter and manga author. He is a graduate of Scenario Center, when writing for manga he uses the pen name Ryu Kamio (神尾 龍, Kamio Ryū).

== Filmography ==
=== Anime television series ===
- Ninku (1995) – Screenplay
- Virtua Fighter (1995–1996) – Series composition, screenplay
- Sensual Phrase (1999–2000) – Screenplay
- Kaleido Star (2003–2004) – Screenplay
- Mushiking: The Guardians of the Forest (2005–2006) – Screenplay
- Capeta (2005–2006) – Series composition, screenplay
- Ghost Hunt (2006–2007) – Series composition, screenplay
- D.Gray-man (2006–2008) – Screenplay
- Casshern Sins (2008–2009) – Screenplay
- Rideback (2009) – Storyboard artist for episode 11
- Cookin' Idol Ai! Mai! Main! (2009–2013) – Screenplay
- Bakuman (2010) – Screenplay
- Yu-Gi-Oh! Zexal (2011–2012) – Screenplay
- Hunter × Hunter (2012–2014) – Series composition (episodes 39–148), screenplay
- Yu-Gi-Oh! Arc-V (2014–2017) – Series composition, screenplay
- ClassicaLoid (2017–2018) – Screenplay

=== TV Tokusatsu ===
- Chouseishin Gransazer (2004) – Screenplay
- Genseishin Justirisers (2004–2005) – Composition, screenplay

=== Films ===
- Yokohama Bakkuretai Junjo Goromaki Shito Hen (1995) – Adaptation/Dramatization
- Winning Odds (1997) – Screenplay
- Appleseed (2004) – Screenplay

=== Manga ===
- The Promised Day (1992) – Author (Art by Takeshi Ōshima)
- I'm Counting On You: Baseball-crazy parents and children's struggles (1999) – Author (Art by Yû Nakahara)
- Akamatsu-san (2001) – Author (Art by Yû Nakahara)
- Last Inning (2004–2014) – Author (Art by Yû Nakahara)
- Ohtori (2005–2007) – Author (Art by Michio Watanabe)
- Lion Crest (2005) – Author (Art by Katsuhiro Nagasawa)
- Contingent Worker Oginn (2006) – Author (Art by Naoyuki Ochiai)
- Driving Doctor Kurosaki (2020) – Author (Art by Yūdai)
- Romantic Comedy and the Unwritten Rules of Monster Extermination (2023–2024) – Author (Art by Miike Kei)
- Stray (2024) – Author (Art by Yû Nakahara)

=== Light novels ===
- Grand Prix (1998) – Author
- Grand Prix 2 (1998) – Author
- Grand Prix 3 (1999) – Author
