= Goes (surname) =

Goes is a surname. They may refer to:

- Albrecht Goes (1908–2000), German writer and Protestant theologian
- Jelle Goes (born 1970), Dutch football manager
- Joaquim Goes, Indian oceanographer
- Luís Goes (1933–2012), Portuguese musician
- Peter Goes (born 1968), Belgian author and illustrator
- Sandry Roberto Santos Goes (born 2002), Brazilian footballer
- Wouter Goes (born 2004), Dutch footballer
- Bento de Goes (1562–1607), Portuguese missionary and explorer
- Eric Batista de Goes (born 1984), Brazilian footballer
- Rodrygo Silva de Goes (born 2001), Brazilian footballer
- Adriaen van der Goes (c. 1505–1560), Dutch grand pensionary
- Freddie van der Goes (1908–1976), South African swimmer
- Hugo van der Goes (c. 1430/1440–1482), Flemish painter
- Louis Napoleon van der Goes van Dirxland (1806–1885), Dutch politician
- Marinus van der Goes van Naters (1900–2005), Dutch nobleman and politician
- Philips van der Goes (1651–1707), Dutch naval officer
- Wouter van der Goes (born 1973), Dutch radio disc jockey

== See also ==
- Vinícius Goes Barbosa de Souza (born 1991), Brazilian footballer
- Gois (disambiguation)
- Góes
