= Goes (disambiguation) =

Goes is a city in the Netherlands.

Goes or GOES may also refer to:

== Places ==
- Goès, a commune in the Pyrénées-Atlantiques département in France
- Goes railway station, a depot in the city of Goes in the Netherlands
- Goes Station, Ohio, a small unincorporated community in northern Xenia Township, Greene County, Ohio, United States

== Other uses ==
- GOES (ATV brand), a French all-terrain vehicle manufacturer
- Goes (beetle), a genus of longhorn beetles in the family Cerambycidae
- Goes (surname)
- Goes!, 2016 video game
- Geostationary Operational Environmental Satellite (GOES), a system of weather-research satellites
- Global Online Enrollment System (GOES), the predecessor to the U.S. Customs and Border Protection's TTP Trusted Traveler System
- Grain-oriented electrical steel, a metal used in the energy industry
- VV Goes, football club from Goes, Netherlands

== See also ==
- Gois (disambiguation)
