= Matoi (name) =

Matoi (纏, まとい) can be a given name or a surname.

== Fictional characters ==
- Ryuko Matoi (纏 流子), Main character from Kill la Kill
- Matoi Shinonome (東雲 纏), a character from Z/X
- Matoi Tatsumi (巽 纏), a character from the Tatsumi family in Kyuukyuu Sentai GoGoFive
- Matoi Tsunetsuki (常月 まとい), a character from Sayonara, Zetsubou-Sensei
- Matoi Sumeragi (皇まとい), Main character from Matoi the Sacred Slayer
