= Yuki Kaida =

Japanese voice actress

- 甲斐田 ゆき
- Born: November 30, 1974 (age 51); Tokyo, Japan
- Other names: Yukki (ゆっきー, Yukki); Nikki (ニッキー, Nikki)
- Occupation: Voice actress
- Years active: 1993–present
- Notable work: Hunter × Hunter (1999) as Kurapika; The Prince of Tennis as Shusuke Fuji; Shōnen Onmyōji as Abe no Masahiro; Hetalia: Axis Powers as China; .hack//Legend of the Twilight as Ouka

Yuki Kaida (甲斐田 ゆき, Kaida Yuki) (born November 30, 1974) is a Japanese voice actress. Although she has an extensive vocal range, voicing a large variety of characters throughout her career, she is commonly typecasted as young males, achieving mainstream success as her roles in Hunter × Hunter as Kurapika, The Prince of Tennis as Shusuke Fuji, Shōnen Onmyōji as Abe no Masahiro. and Hetalia: Axis Powers and Hetalia World Series as China or Yao Wang. She was formerly affiliated with the talent management agency Toritori Office, but is currently freelance.

Kaida is one of the few Japanese voice actors to have completed their formal education in the United States. Consequently, Kaida is multilingual with varying degrees of fluency apart from Japanese. Kaida is lovingly nicknamed Yukki (ゆっきー) by her Japanese fans.

== Biography ==
=== Career ===
Kaida was born in Tokyo, Japan, and was raised in the Shinjuku ward of the city. Shortly following her graduation from Shinjuku High School, she enrolled in the International University of Art and Music in San Diego, California, and studied abroad for four years, where she majored in musical theater. She returned to Japan to focus on voice acting, making her debut in the OVA Southern Wind as Himiko, followed up by some minor roles in other television animation; but her first major role as a voice actor came when she was cast as Kurapika in Hunter × Hunter in 1999, after which her popularity began to grow. However, she went on to perform her arguably most well-known role, that of Shusuke Fuji in The Prince of Tennis, which began airing in 2001; she reprises the role for later adaptations as well as for voice acting events to promote the series and for CDs sung as the character. She is also known for her wide vocal range and feminine natural voice, being skilled at voicing males as well as adult women such as Ouka from .hack//Legend of the Twilight, gag characters such as Son Goku/Patalliro from Patalliro Saiyuki!, and young females such as Machi Kuragi from Fruits Basket.

In addition to voice acting, she is also a prominent radio personality, and is the current announcer for Sadao Watanabe's radio show, Nightly Yours. She is nicknamed Yukki (ゆっきー), which is also her blog nickname, and Nikki (ニッキー), the latter being a corruption of the former. She is also a member of the voice acting unit AZU alongside Junko Takeuchi and Junko Minagawa, and is a member of the unit Takada Hiroyuki alongside Hiroki Takahashi.

=== Personal life ===
She is notably multilingual, competent in French and Chinese, as well as being a fluent English speaker; the latter being evident in her Western education, her interest in Queen and the Chronicles of Narnia, and also by having an all-English speaking role as Angela Burton in Genshiken. Her other hobbies include watching rakugo, especially Kosanji Yanagiya, and baseball, while she also has a pet dog named Vivian. She is commonly mistaken for her friend and fellow voice actress Yūko Kaida, due to the fact that their names differ by only two characters and one letter in romanization.

== Filmography ==
=== Animation ===
Year	Title	Role	Source
1999	Betterman	Mother Hinoki	
1999	Detective Conan	Yuri Arisato, Yuriko Tomosato	
1999	Hoshin Engi	Yong	
1999	Hunter × Hunter	Kurapika, Fumi, Heaven's Arena 200th Floor Employee	
1999	Karakurizōshi Ayatsuri Sakon	Yuki Kagawa	
1999	Corrector Yui	Fiina	
1999	Seraphim Call	Lulu Sanjō	
2000	Doki Doki Densetsu Mahōjin Guru Guru	Female voice, Kukuri's Mother	
2001	Ask Dr. Rin!	Cynthia	
2001	Corrector Yui	Feena	
2001	Dennō Bōkenki Webdiver	Karon, Shō Kurachi, Midori Asaba	
2001	Hanaukyo Maid Team	Taro Hanaukyo	
2001	The Prince of Tennis	Shusuke Fuji, Yumiko Fuji, Yuuta Fuji (young)	
2002	Beyblade	Ozma, Kyouju's Mother	
2002	Daigunder	Ryugu	
2002	Digimon Frontier	Gomamon	
2003	Origami Warriors	Kasumi Ayase	
2003	Ashita no Nadja	Cream, Alan's friend, Mireille Morrow, Lady, T.J. Livingston	
2003	.hack//Legend of the Twilight	Ouka	
2003	Twin Spica	Shū Suzuki	
2003	Zatch Bell!	Eshros	
2004	Fantastic Children	Gherta Hawksbee, Tooma's Mother	
2004	Hanaukyo Maid Team: La Verite	Taro Hanaukyo	
2004	Kamichu!	Ukeru Nishimura	
2004	Shura no Toki: Age of Chaos	Yuki-hime	
2004	Soreike! Zukkoke Sanningumi	Tokiko Okuda	
2004	Yugo the Negotiator	Mariko	
2005	Absolute Boy	Masaki Makabe	
2005	Rockman.EXE Beast	Dark Kirisaki	
2005	Patalliro Saiyuki!	Son Goku/Patalliro	
2005	Suzuka	Ayano Fujikawa	
2005	Doraemon	Sunetsugu	
2006	Ballad of a Shinigami	Mitsuki Asano	
2006	Le Chevalier d'Eon	Marie	
2006	Futari wa Pretty Cure Splash Star	Shizue Hoshino, Tomoya's Mother	
2006	Inukami!	Kaoru Kawahira	
2006	Shooting Star Rockman	Tsukasa Futaba	
2006	Powerpuff Girls Z	Femme Fatale, Young Professor Utonium	
2006	Shōnen Onmyōji	Abe no Masahiro	
2006	009-1	Billy	
2007	Genshiken	Angela Burton	
2007	Kamichama Karin	Kirika Karasuma	
2007	Kishin Taisen Gigantic Formula	Michael Schmidt	
2007	Oshare Majo Love and Berry: Shiwase no Mahou	Shou	
2007	Saint Beast: Kōin Jojishi Tenshi Tan	Cassandra	
2007	Sisters of Wellber	Jamille Kaela	
2007	The Story of Saiunkoku	Riō Hyo Jr.	
2008	Kyōran Kazoku Nikki	Drinda	
2008	Porphy no Nagai Tabi	Porphyras Patagos	
2008	Sekirei	Homura/Kagari	
2008	Sisters of Wellber Zwei	Jamille Kaela	
2009	Hetalia: Axis Powers	China, Zashiki-Warashi, Narrator	
2009	Jewelpet	Akira Nanase, Sayuri Kōgyoku, Ai Majō, Peridot	
2009	The Beast Player Erin	Yuan	
2009	Queen's Blade -Rurō no Senshi-	Echidna	
2009	Queen's Blade -Gyokuza no Tsugumono	Echidna	
2009	Umineko no Naku Koro ni	Gaap	
2009	Aoi Bungaku	Wife E	
2009	Viper's Creed	Thelesia	
2010	Aki Sora ~Yume no Naka~	Sora Aoi (credited as Kumo Shirai)	
2010	Inazuma Eleven	Rococo Urupa, Sein	
2010	Jewelpet Twinkle	Marie Sakura, Peridot	
2010	Maid Sama!	Aoi Hyōdo	
2010	Sekirei ～Pure Engagement～	Homura/Kagari	
2010	Hetalia: World Series	China, Narrator	
2011	Jewelpet Sunshine	Jill Konia, Peridot	
2011	B-Daman Crossfire	Daiki Watari	
2012	Jewelpet Kira Deco	Peridot	
2012	New Prince of Tennis	Shusuke Fuji	
2013	Jewelpet Happiness	Peridot	
2013	Encouragement of Climb	Jennifer	
2013	Gifuu Doudou!!: Kanetsugu to Keiji	Seion-Ni	
2013	Hetalia: The Beautiful World	China	
2013	Hakkenden: Eight Dogs of the East	Akihiko Narumura	
2014	Lady Jewelpet''	Peridot	
2014	Mekakucity Actors	Rin Kido (Tsubomi Kido's sister), Young Shuuya Kano	
2014	Aldnoah.Zero	Femieanne	
2014	Kuroko's Basketball Season 2	Alexandra Garcia	
2015	Go! Princess PreCure	Lock, Kuroro	
2015	Gintama	Kotarou Katsura	
2015	Hetalia: World Twinkle	China	
2015	Kuroko's Basketball Season 3	Alexandra Garcia	
2016	Aokana: Four Rhythm Across the Blue	Kasumi Kurobuchi	
2016	One Piece	Desire	
2016	Matoi the Sacred Slayer	Shiori Sumeragi	
2017	Beyblade Burst God	Boa Alcacer	
2017	Gintama	Kotarou Katsura (young)	
2020	The God of High School	Commissioner O	
2021	Hetalia: World Stars	China, Narrator	
2021	Detective Conan	Shukichi Haneda (young)	
2022	The Greatest Demon Lord Is Reborn as a Typical Nobody	Lydia Beginsgate	
2022	Arknights: Prelude to Dawn	Doctor	

=== OVA/ONA ===
Year	Title	Role/Source
1998	Southern Wind	Himiko (debut role)
2001	Hanaukyo Maid Team OVA; Samurai X: Reflection	Taro Hanaukyo; Kenji Himura
2002	Hunter × Hunter; Anime Koten Bungaku Kan	Kurapika; Tokiko
2003	Hunter × Hunter: Greed Island; The Prince of Tennis: A Day on Survival Mountain	Kurapika; Shusuke Fuji
2004	Hunter × Hunter: Greed Island Final	Angel's Breath, Kurapika
2006	Saint Beast: Ikusen no Hiru to Yoru Hen; The Prince of Tennis: The National Tournament	Cassandra; Shusuke Fuji
2007	Ikoku Irokoi Romantan	Kaoru Omi
2009	Sekirei: The First Errand; The Prince of Tennis: Another Story	Homura/Kagari; Shusuke Fuji
2010	Aki Sora: Yume no Naka; Queen's Blade: Beautiful Warriors	Sora Aoi (as Kumo Shirai); Echidna
2011	The Prince of Tennis: Another Story II	Shusuke Fuji
2012-13	New Prince of Tennis SPECIAL	Shusuke Fuji
2014	New Prince of Tennis: OVA vs Genius 10	Shusuke Fuji
2017	Matoi the Sacred Slayer	Shiori Sumeragi
2018-20	Queen's Blade: Unlimited; The Prince of Tennis: Best Games!!	Echidna; Shusuke Fuji

=== Film ===
Year	Title	Role	Source
1999	Marco - Carry a Dream	Woman B	
2005	Tennis no Oujisama: Atobe Kara no Okurimono	Shusuke Fuji	
2005	The Prince of Tennis- Two Samurais: The First Game	Shusuke Fuji	
2007	Love and Berry: Dress Up and Dance - Magic of Happiness	Shou	
2010	Hetalia Axis Powers: Paint it, White!	China, Zashiki Warashi	
2011	The Prince of Tennis: Eikoku-shiki Teikyū-jō Kessen!	Shusuke Fuji	
2014	Detective Conan: Dimensional Sniper	Receptionist	
2014	Inazuma Eleven: Chōjigen Dream Match	Rococo Urupa	
2016	Doraemon: Nobita and the Birth of Japan 2016	Draco	
2017	Kuroko's Basketball The Movie: Last Game	Alexandra Garcia	

=== Drama CD ===
Year	Titile	Role	Source
2000	Rurouni Kenshin	Himura Kenshin	
2000	Hunter × Hunter	Kurapika	
2003	.hack//Legend of the Twilight	Ouka	
2003	Koori no Mamono no Monogatari	Rapunzel	
2003	MeruPuri	Aram (young)	
2004	Crimson Hero	Momoko Sumiyoshi	
2004	Hanaukyo Maid Team: La Verite	Taro Hanaukyo	
2004	Integra	Saori Enomoto	
2004	Saint Beast	Cassandra	
2004	Shōnen Onmyōji	Abe no Masahiro	
2005	Five	Chiwa Masato	
2005	Fruits Basket	Machi Kuragi	
2005	Nadepro!	Yoshinao Kai, Kobato Sakisaka	
2005	Patalliro Saiyuki!	Son Goku/Patalliro	
2006	Kimi to Boku (manga)	Asaba Yuuta	
2007	Blaue Rosen	Ai Okita	
2007	CLASH! Strange Detectives	Madoka Furuya	
2007	Kokaku Torimonochou (Red Hot Chilli Samurai)	Tsumugi Ooshima	
2007	Sekirei	Homura/Kagari	
2007	Shakunetsu no Yoru ni Idakarete	Saori Chihara	
2008	Maid Sama!	Aoi Hyōdō	
2008–15	Hetalia: Axis Powers Drama CDs	China, Narrator, Taiwan	
2020	Idol Show Time	Iori Munekata	

=== Video games ===
Year	Title	Role/Source
	The Prince of Tennis series	Shusuke Fuji
1997	RacinGroovy VS	Announcer
1998	Kuro no Danshō; Star Ocean: The Second Story	Haruka Sakimizu; Celine Jules, Leon D.S. Geeste
2003	Castle Shikigami 2	Yukari Horiguchi
2004	Super Robot Wars	Asuka Tsukishiro, Wendolo
2005	Musashi: Samurai Legend	Musashi
2007	Digimon World Data Squad; Kurukuru ◇ Princess 〜Yume no White Quartet〜	Lilithmon; Leah W. Mishima
2009	Nadepro! 〜Kisama mo Seiyū Yatte Miro!?〜; PROJECT CERBERUS; Tales of Graces	Yoshinao Kai, Kobato Sakisaka; Eimi Kojima, Fumiya Andō; Asbel Lhant (child)
2010	Xenoblade Chronicles; Heavy Rain	Riki, Vanea; Madison Paige
2012	Digimon World Re:Digitize	Yuya Kuga
2014	Granblue Fantasy	Balurga
2016	Aokana: Four Rhythm Across the Blue; Goes!	Kasumi Kurobuchi; Kuroon
2017	Xenoblade Chronicles 2	Riki
2018	Dragalia Lost; Super Smash Bros. Ultimate	Marishiten; Riki
2021	Another Eden	Clarte
TBA	Devil Prince and Puppet	Claude

=== Musical theater ===
- Hunter x Hunter Musical - Kurapika
- Hunter X Hunter: The Nightmare of Zaoldyeck - Kurapika

=== Dubbing ===
- Elias: The Little Rescue Boat – Sentimental (Marit A. Andreaseen), Little Blinky (Morten Røhrt)
- Thank You for Smoking – Joey Naylor (Cameron Bright)
- Unaccompanied Minors – Charlie Goldfinch (Tyler James Williams)
