= Kagerou Project =

Japanese media franchise

- First light novel volume cover, featuring Shintaro Kisaragi and Ene

カゲロウプロジェクト
- Genre: Psychological; Science fiction
- Light novel

Kagerou Daze
- Written by: Jin (Shizen no Teki-P)
- Illustrated by: Sidu
- Published by: Enterbrain
- English publisher: NA: Yen Press
- Imprint: KCG Bunko
- Original run: May 30, 2012 – December 29, 2017
- Volumes: 8
- Manga

Kagerou Daze
- Written by: Jin (Shizen no Teki-P)
- Illustrated by: Mahiro Satou
- Published by: Media Factory
- English publisher: NA: Yen Press
- Magazine: Monthly Comic Gene
- Original run: June 15, 2012 – February 15, 2019
- Volumes: 13
- Anime television series

Mekakucity Actors
- Directed by: Akiyuki Shinbo (Chief); Yuki Yase
- Produced by: Kuniyasu Ichikawa (Prime Direction); Kenta Suzuki (Aniplex); Akiko Yodo (Aniplex)
- Written by: Jin (Shizen no Teki-P)
- Music by: Jin (Shizen no Teki-P); Anant-Garde Eyes; TeddyLoid; Ryosuke Nakanishi; Shirakami Mashiro; Sasakure.UK; Ishifuro; Yoshimitsu Taki
- Studio: Shaft
- Licensed by: AUS: Madman Entertainment; NA: Aniplex of America
- Original network: Tokyo MX, GTV, GYT, BS11, AT-X
- English network: SEA: Animax Asia
- Original run: April 12, 2014 – June 28, 2014 (Note: As Mekakucity Actors airs on Tokyo MX, GTV, GYT and BS11 on Saturdays, 24:00 (Sundays, 00:00 a.m. JST), the premiere technically occurs on Sunday, April 13, 2014.)
- Episodes: 12
- Anime film

Kagerou Daze -in a day's-
- Directed by: Sidu
- Written by: Sidu
- Music by: Out of Service
- Studio: Jumonji
- Released: November 4, 2016
- Runtime: 20 minutes

The Kagerou Project (カゲロウプロジェクト, Kagerō Purojekuto; lit. 'Heat Haze Project" or "Mayfly Project'), also known as Kagerou Daze (カゲロウデイズ, Kagerō Deizu; lit. 'Heat Haze Daze", or "Mayfly Daze') or Kagerou Days, sometimes referred to as Kagepro (カゲプロ), is a Japanese mixed-media project created by Jin (Shizen no Teki-P) (じん(自然の敵P)).

It initially began as a series of Vocaloid songs that became increasingly popular following the release of the third song, "Kagerou Daze". Eventually, a light novel and manga series, both under the name of Kagerou Daze, were released. In 2014, an anime by Shaft was also released under the name "Mekakucity Actors".

== Story ==
Shintarō Kisaragi has not left his house in over two years, spending all day on his computer and getting ruthlessly teased by Ene, an annoying computer virus. When Shintarō spills a drink on his computer keyboard, he has to buy a replacement in person. Unfortunately, terrorists arrive and Shintaro is taken hostage. However, he meets a group of young people, including his own sister, called the "Mekakushi Dan" (メカクシ団; lit. 'Blindfold Gang') who stop the criminals using mysterious powers. They then force Shintarō to join their group. Little does he know, the Mekakushi Dan are in for a never-ending summer.

=== Routes ===
The series contains alternative storylines, endings, and in some cases, beginnings, depending on the format of the media. Each storyline is called a "route". These are not adaptations to one another.

- Music Route (2011–2013): the first route created. It contains "Route 1" and "Route XX". It is the series of Vocaloid songs, each focusing on a different character and/or event within the story. There are 2 main albums, Mekakucity Days and Mekakucity Records.
  - Another album, Mekakucity Reload, was released, but the songs in it do not take place within the music route. Rather, they take place around the whole series.
  - Summertime Record from Mekakucity Records also does not occur in the Music Route, but in the Anime Route.
- Manga Route (2012–2019): Though it was debuted in June 2012, Jin confirmed he was working on the manga earlier on, writing the story for it as of "Konoha's World Situation's" music video release in May 2012. It contains "Manga Route 1" and "Manga Route 2", and has 13 total volumes.
- Novel Route (2012–2017): Contains only one route told from a first-person perspective. Like the songs, every volume focuses on a different character, but they also have chapters about other characters. It has 8 total volumes.
- Anime Route: The final canonical route, marking the end of the project. It contains covers of the songs, that were collected along with the OST in "Mekakucity M's".
- Kagerou Daze -in a day's- (カゲロウデイズ-in a day's-) is an MX4D produced an animated short movie in which the Mekakushi Dan join up once again to stop an incident occurring at the mall. This Mekakushi Dan consists of Dan members 1-7 initially, and also containing Ene, Hibiya Amamiya, Konoha, and Hiyori Asahina, despite the events of the previous "routes". Certain other members related to the Dan do not appear in this "route", while instead "new" characters do; however, the "new" characters' identities were kept somewhat secret, including their names. The "new" characters were created specifically for this film. However, the canonicity of this route is debatable.

Various other smaller or shorter timelines occur within the series but are not completely shown. These are all indicated in detail in the "Kagerou Project Perfect Guide" (2016) and with glimpses from other routes. While most of the timelines occur between August 14–15, some timelines' initial storylines are indicated to happen before the main series begins. This includes the backstories of Kido, Kano, and Seto, supporting character Ayano Tateyama, and Mekakushi Dan member Marry Kozakura. Other timelines detailing Marry's own backstory and historical events also are noted to happen on August 15 or other close dates.

== Characters ==
=== Mekakushi Dan ===
Kido (キド, Kido) / Tsubomi Kido (木戸 つぼみ, Kido Tsubomi)
Voiced by: Yūko Kaida
Kido is member No. 1 of the Mekakushi Dan and its current leader. She is often mistaken as a male due to her androgynous appearance. The other members of the Dan call her "Danchō" (lit. gang leader). Like Kano and Seto, she is addressed by her legal last name even by her closest friends. Her personal song is "Never Lost Word" (失想ワアド, Shissō Wādo), though she initially debuted in "Blindfold Chord" (メカクシコード, Mekakushi Chord).
Kido was born the first daughter of a wealthy family, but due to being the illegitimate child between her biological father and his mistress, she was always treated cautiously by those around her. Because of this, she harbored a strong desire to "disappear." One day, her father's business went bankrupt, driving him to set their house on fire. After being burned to death, Kido came into contact with the Heat Haze along with her older half-sister Rin (Voiced by: Yuki Kaida) and was possessed by the snake with the "Concealing Eyes" ability, acquiring the power to hide her presence as well as the presence of anyone else within a two meter radius. She would then proceed to forget about the Heat Haze until the seventh novel, "From the Darkness." She became childhood friends with Seto and Kano in an orphanage. The trio was fostered temporarily by the Tateyama family. After being encouraged by Ayano that having red eyes was the sign of a hero, Kido starts the Mekakushi Dan with Ayano, Seto, and Kano. After Ayano's death, she was then given the role of "leader".
Seto (セト, Seto) / Kōsuke Seto (瀬戸 幸助, Seto Kōsuke)
Voiced by: Sōichirō Hoshi, Sayori Ishizuka (young)
Seto is member No. 2 of the Mekakushi Dan. He is often portrayed as the "nice" one of the group, and gets along very well with Marry. Like Kano and Kido, he is addressed by his legal last name even by his closest friends. His song is "Shōnen Brave" (少年ブレイブ; "Brave Boy").
As a young boy, he was often bullied. He considered an abandoned dog (named "Hanako") to be his only friend, and wished that he could "understand how people felt without using words". One stormy day, he witnessed some kids trying to throw his dog into a river. Despite his efforts, the dog was thrown in, and Seto threw himself into the river in order to save it. As he drowned, he came into contact with the Heat Haze and was possessed by the snake with the "Stealing Eyes" ability, acquiring the ability to read others' minds upon eye contact. However, he dislikes using his eye ability as he feels that it is invasive, and he avoids using it unless it is necessary. He eventually was fostered temporarily by the Tateyama family along with Kido and Kano. Together they created the Mekakushi Dan after being initially encouraged by Ayano.
He first debuts in "Imagination Forest" (as "Sōzō Foresuto" (空想フォレスト; "Imagination Forest")). His expression is partly hidden the entire time, as his older design hadn't yet been made by animator Sidu.
Kano (カノ, Kano) / Shūya Kano (鹿野 修哉, Kano Shūya)
Voiced by: Shinnosuke Tachibana, Yuki Kaida (young)
Kano is member No. 3 of the Mekakushi Dan. He is depicted as a deceitful person, to the point where no one can tell if he's lying or telling the truth. His song is "Yobanashi Deceive" (夜咄ディセイブ; "Night Tales Deceive").
When Kano was younger, he did not attend preschool or kindergarten and instead lived alone with his mother in an apartment. His emotionally unstable mother was abusive, and the neighbors spread rumors that he was being abused by her. In the novels' "route", he believed that he was wrong for upsetting her, and desired to "hide the bruises/wounds on his body" from those around him because they were the reason the neighbors disliked his mother. One day, his apartment was broken into by thieves. Kano's mother was stabbed and killed as she tried to protect him. He was stabbed to death as well when he tried to fight against the thieves, coming into contact with the Heat Haze. He was then possessed by the snake with the "Deceiving Eyes" ability, acquiring the power to alter how people around him perceive him and anything in immediate contact with him.
He was eventually brought to an orphanage where he met Kido and Seto. Later on, while being fostered temporarily by the Tateyama family, they meet a younger Ayano (Kano having already met her previously as a stranger in the novel route). They create a team of "heroes" and Kano gave it its name, the Mekakushi Dan—"Mekakushi" being a pun on Kido's eye ability. Unlike Seto, Kano uses his eye ability frequently to hide his true feelings on the inside. He and Ayano were very close, as she only shared her suspicions about Kenjirō with him. As a result, he often impersonated her and went to school in her stead, while she researched a way to stop the plans of Clearing Eyes. Ayano's death affects him greatly, and the added trauma of having to pretend to be Ayano's corpse during the funeral (as she did not leave behind a body) leaves him emotionally distressed.
In the music video for "Yobanashi Deceive" (夜咄ディセイブ; "Night Tales Deceive") in "music" route, Kano continuously walks the streets at night. He briefly is seen wearing hair clips while grinning, while images of a younger Seto and younger Kido are also seen behind him (Seto also wears items connected to Ayano in the music video). Kano is later seen with a "female" form, shown more than once (including together) in both the official music video as well as published artbooks. He is constantly deceiving, initially believing himself to be something like a "monster". When a monster (implied to be Clearing Eyes in the novels) speaks to him one day, Kano begins to descend into always telling lies, unable to tell his true self from his "Deceiving" self.
Marry (マリー, Marī) / Marry Kozakura (小桜 茉莉, Kozakura Marī)
Voiced by: Kana Hanazawa
Marry is member No. 4 of the Mekakushi Dan, and the first non-founding member. She is 1/4 Medusa and has white hair that wiggles when she is happy or frightened and naturally occurring red eyes. Her appearance is that of a teenage girl, although her actual age is 140 years. Marry is extremely shy around strangers, and will often hide behind Seto, Kido, or Momo. Her songs are "Kūsō Forest" (空想フォレスト; "Fantasy Forest") and "Marry no Kakū Sekai" (マリーの架空世界; "Marry's Fictional World").
When Marry was younger, she lived in a small house in the woods with her mother, Shion, who was half Medusa. While growing up, she was constantly warned by her mother that should they make eye contact with others, the person would be turned to stone. One day, when she was playing outside against her mother's warnings, she was found and tortured by a group of boys. Shion successfully turned Marry's attackers to stone, but the two were both beaten to death and were brought into the Heat Haze by Azami. Shion's full Medusa mother (and Marry's grandmother). Upon entering it, Azami planted the snake with the "Combining Eyes" ability, the core of the Medusa, into Shion, who willingly gave it up to Marry so that she could have a second chance at life. As a result, along with the "Eye Contact" ability she had since birth (which allows Marry to temporarily paralyze anyone she makeseye contact with), Marry later acquired the ability to unify all of the "snakes".
After coming back to life, she lived in isolation for over a hundred years, greatly traumatized by her mother's death and terrified by the outside world. By chance, Seto visited the forest and befriended her, making her realize that the outside isn't so scary after all. He later managed to bring her to the outside world and invited her to join the Mekakushi Dan.

In Route XX among other "bad end" timelines, Clearing Eyes kills all the members of the Mekakushi Dan besides Marry, and has her reset the timeline. This happens by means of her Combining Eyes ability, used through her by the snake of 'Clearing Eyes', who "awakens" her (often in "Queen" form), and, by "collecting" the snakes that "have lost their owners", she reverses time in order to save everyone. Marry seemingly reverses time at the end of every official "route" and "timeline" seen thus far.

It's also revealed in the same alternate second timeline of the manga that Marry's "Queen" (of the snakes) power here causes a great toll on her body as it slowly deteriorates her body to the point she can't move at all, possibly a result of her being more human than Medusa. Despite her cheerful personality, a monologue in the manga implies that while she loves her friends, she harbors a grudge against the world for taking everything from her, reflecting some of the attitudes her grandmother Azami and her mother Shion held towards humanity. She begins to absorb the powers of the snakes of her fallen comrades. The Mekakushi Dan members left, including her, would then attempt to face off against the Snake of Clearing Eyes.
Momo (モモ, Momo) / Momo Kisaragi (如月 桃, Kisaragi Momo)
Voiced by: Nanami Kashiyama
Momo is member No. 5 of the Mekakushi Dan. She is a first-year high school student. She is the younger sister of Shintarō and a popular idol, which greatly disrupts her normal life and causes a lot of stress for her. Unlike her brother, she does badly at school and is a clumsy yet cheerful girl. Momo's tastes are also shown to be rather strange. Her songs are "Kisaragi Attention" (如月アテンション), "Otsukimi Recital" (オツキミリサイタル; "Moon Viewing Recital") (with Hibiya Amamiya), and "Tomodachi no Uta" (友達の唄, Song of Friends/A Song of My Friend).
When Momo was younger, she was constantly overshadowed by her brother Shintarō causing her to yearn for attention. During a trip to the beach, she drowned in the ocean and was swallowed up by the Heat Haze, along with her father who had tried to save her and given the snake of "Drawing Eyes", which is capable of catching people's attention regardless of their preferences. At a fairly young age as a Junior High schooler, she gets a job as an idol, but she finds the constant attention and pressure miserable, lamenting that she just wants to be normal. It's here that she meets Kido, who explains the nature of their powers and offers to teach Momo how to control her Drawing Eyes if she joins the Mekakushi Dan. Momo accepts, to Shintarō's eventual chagrin.
Ene (エネ, Ene) / Takane Enomoto (榎本 貴音, Enomoto Takane)
Voiced by: Kana Asumi
Ene is member No. 6 of Mekakushi Dan. She is a mischievous cyber girl who lives in Shintarō's computer, but is also able to travel to other electronic devices. Once a human named Takane Enomoto (榎本 貴音, Enomoto Takane), her personality as Ene is a cheerful prankster, a sharp contrast to Takane's pessimistic outlook at life. Her songs are "Jinzō Enemy" (人造エネミー; "Artificial Enemy"), "Headphone Actor" (ヘッドフォンアクター), "Ene no Dennō Kikō" (エネの電脳紀行; "Ene's Cyber Journey") and "Yūkei Yesterday" (夕景イエスタデイ; "Yesterday Evening").
As a human, she suffered from an illness that causes her to lose consciousness at random times. Because of this, she was placed in a separate class at school with Haruka Kokonose, whom she harbored feelings for. As a human, Takane was ranked second in the country on a game called 'Dead Bullet -1989-' under the name of "Senkou no Maihime" (lit. Dancing Princess of the Spotlight)' and often stayed up late at night playing. This exacerbated her narcolepsy and made her irritable and bad-tempered at school. She died after being poisoned by Kenjirō. Upon entering the Heat Haze, she is given the snake of "Opening Eyes", giving her immortality through the ability to reside in digital objects. After becoming Ene, she was sent to Shintarō's computer in an email from an unknown sender. Shintarō refers to her as a 'virus' as she constantly plays pranks on him by deleting his files and threatening to upload his embarrassing poems on to the internet. Ene joins the Mekakushi Dan after helping to stop a terrorist attack at a local department store with Shintarō.
Shintarō (シンタロー, Shintarō) / Shintarō Kisaragi (如月 伸太郎, Kisaragi Shintarō)
Voiced by: Takuma Terashima
Shintarō is member No. 7 of Mekakushi Dan. He is the main protagonist of the story and has an IQ of 168. While he was in school, his intelligence caused him to have an apathetic personality. His songs are "Lost Time Memory" (ロスタイムメモリー) and "Tōmei Answer" (透明アンサー; "Transparent Answer").
After a while, he became interested in the girl who sat next to him in class, Ayano Tateyama. Despite Ayano always acting cheerful and friendly towards him, Shintarō would treat Ayano with something like coldness – though he is also shown to begin to regard Ayano at all, if not fully as a "friend". Ayano appears happy whenever Shintaro regards her. After Ayano's suicide, he falls into a deep depression and becomes a hikikomori addicted to the internet. A year after, he was "sent" a mysterious "virus" named Ene, and as he was unable to control her actions, his lifestyle was at a loss. After stopping a terrorist attack with Ene, he became involved with Mekakushi Dan. He would later come to possess the "Retaining Eyes", which allow him to remember all of the past (including all other previous routes and otherwise diverging timelines).
In the songs ("Music Route") Ayano's death results in two possible routes for the Mekakushi Dan, as shown in Lost Time Memory. In Route 1, also known as the Good End Route, Shintarō (often portrayed in a red jersey) goes out and meets the Mekakushi Dan instead of staying at home and mourning Ayano. In Route XX, also known as the Bad End, Shintarō (often portrayed in full black clothing), still mourning over Ayano's death at 18 years old, becomes fed up with Ene and kills her through unknown means, causing him to have a mental breakdown. The main Shintarō dies while saving "Kuroha" (or, Clearing Eyes possessed Konoha) from shooting himself, while Route XX Shintarō commits suicide by slitting his throat with a pair of red scissors. However, all of these events would supposedly lead to Shintarō coming to possess "Retaining Eyes".
Later on in the manga's alternate second timeline, he would officially join the Mekakushi Dan again. He does so by going to their new hideout, and encounters Ayano. Though Ayano initially tries to point out he doesn't have an eye power to protect himself while seeming nervous by his presence; Shintarō goes on to explain: he thought, if there was "someone he could save", he'll "keep struggling" to "protect that person", "and that person can be no one else" but Ayano herself. He declares he'll use all of his "life force" to "fight" for her, also declaring, "I'm here to help you!" Ayano responds by blushing terribly in her shock and surprise, and he is accepted into the Dan's hideout.
Hibiya (ヒビヤ, Hibiya) / Hibiya Amamiya (雨宮 響也, Amamiya Hibiya)
Voiced by: Misuzu Togashi
Hibiya is member No. 8 of Mekakushi Dan. He is mentioned to be mature for his age and is shown to have an immense crush on Hiyori. In the novels and anime, he joins Mekakushi Dan after being spotted escaping the hospital he was at after an accident. His songs are "Kagerou Daze" (カゲロウデイズ; "Heat Haze Daze") and "Otsukimi Recital" (オツキミリサイタル; "Moon-viewing Recital") (with Momo Kisaragi). Though it is not his song, he also appears in "Konoha no Sekai Jijō" (コノハの世界事情; "Konoha's World Situation").
As a sixth-grade primary schooler, he is the youngest member of the group, at 12 years old (in "Mekakucity Talkers", he prepares to take Junior High exams, and later meets back up with Hiyori "at school" in what's initially implied to be a post-summer scenario.). He has the "Eye Focusing" ability, meaning he can see distant objects from an aerial view. He is originally from a village in the rural countryside and came with Hiyori Asahina to the city for the summer. He stayed at Hiyori's sister's house for the visit and met Konoha, who was living there at the time.
Hibiya sees Hiyori die in a traffic accident and somehow becomes stuck in a time loop trying to save her from dying, each time ending with him sacrificing himself to try and save Hiyori. He comes in contact with the Heat Haze and is given the snake of 'Focusing Eyes'.
Konoha (コノハ, Konoha) / Haruka Kokonose (九ノ瀬 遥, Kokonose Haruka)
Voiced by: Mamoru Miyano
Konoha is member No. 9 of Mekakushi Dan. Shown to be a rather absent-minded individual, he has a large appetite, similar to his human self as Haruka. His songs are "Konoha no Sekai Jijō" (コノハの世界事情; "Konoha's World Situation"), "Yūkei Yesterday" (夕景イエスタデイ; "Yesterday Evening") (as Haruka), "Outer Science" (アウターサイエンス) (as Black Konoha), and "Summertime Record" (サマータイムレコード) (as both, or Haruka).
As a human, Haruka suffered from an illness which caused him to have "attacks" and collapse, making him have less time to live, hence making him wish for a body that would not be as vulnerable, and hence being placed in a separate class with Takane Enomoto. With the interference of Kenjirō, he suffers an attack and dies, entering the Heat Haze with Takane, and therefore receiving the "Awakening Eyes" ability, which allows him to live in his ideal body. However, instead of being sent back like the others in the Heat Haze, Haruka stayed in the Heat Haze while the Snake of Awakening Eyes inhabits his body as Konoha, attempting to carry on Haruka's wishes of spending time with his friends. After this, the amnesiac Konoha stays at Ayaka's house, where he meets Hibiya and Hiyori and attempts to save them from the Heat Haze.
Though Konoha is born from such means, he is seen as being overall different from Haruka – Takane even noting such in the anime (and Ene thus calling Konoha "imposter") and is treated as being his own person. He is noted to have an "immortal body".
An alternate version of Konoha appears in Outer Science, notably during the "Music Route", called Black Konoha (also dubbed as Kuroha by Japanese fans, kuro (黒) meaning 'black'), and kills everyone in Route XX. In Route 1 (notably during "Lost Time Memory", in "Music Route") for unknown reasons, he attempts to shoot himself in the head, only to be saved by Shintarō; "Kuroha"'s eyes widening in shock as he watches Shintarō fall (it is unknown if the one shocked in "Music Route" was Konoha, or Clearing Eyes himself). In the anime, "Kuroha" is revealed to be the snake of 'Clearing Eyes', Kenjirō's eye ability, which has transferred itself to Konoha (termed "forming" in him) and possessed him, believing him to be a stronger vessel.
Ayano (アヤノ, Ayano) / Ayano Tateyama (楯山 文乃, Tateyama Ayano)
Voiced by: Mai Nakahara
Ayano is member No. 0 of the Mekakushi Dan and was the daughter of Kenjirō and Ayaka Tateyama. Shown to be a happy-go-lucky girl with rather poor grades, she was the deskmate of Shintarō, and it is suggested that her poor grades stemmed from her family matters. Her songs are "Tōmei Answer" (透明アンサー; "Transparent Answer"), "Ayano no Kōfuku Riron" (アヤノの幸福理論; "Ayano's Theory of Happiness"), and "Adishonaru Memorī" (アディショナルメモリ, "Additional Memory").
In most major timelines after her parents briefly fostered three young children with red eyes, Kido, Seto, and Kano, she decided to fulfill her role as "big sister" ("onee-chan") by creating the Mekakushi Dan to encourage them. After the death of her mother in a landslide and the discovery that her father was experimenting on her friends in an attempt to bring her back to life, Ayano grew increasingly concerned of the safety of the "trio". She committed suicide by jumping off the roof of her school in an attempt to save her family and friends from the plot of the snake that gives Kenjirō the 'Clearing Eyes'. She gets possessed by a snake and obtains the 'Favoring Eyes', which allows her to project her thoughts and emotions unto others.
An Ayano that Shintarō meets at some times (in the real world) is revealed to also be Kano (including in the novels) using his "Deceiving" ability, who does so to spite Shintarō, whom he believes caused Ayano's death. However, Kano would later apologize for the incidents in the seventh novel ("From the Darkness") and Shintarō forgives him, genuinely befriending Kano. Kano would go on to believe (thinking to himself) he was no match for Shintarō. Kano also notes to himself Shintarō would "show a different kind of smile" to "Ayano only"; then thinking Shintarō showed "that kind of smile" to Kano himself as well, showing they fully reconcile.
An Ayano that Shintarō meets in the Heat Haze at other times is revealed to be his own snake, taking on her form wearing her black school uniform, but without her red scarf.
In Route 1, after Shintarō (in red jersey) meets the real Ayano in the Heat Haze, she passes her eye ability to him.
In the music video for the "Music Route" song "Additional Memory", it is revealed she apparently loved Shintarō since the very start all along, saying she didn't want to be "just" "friends". This revelation and seeming realization to herself occurs as she continuously falls from the buildings' rooftop, eventually waking up in the Daze, appearing to her as a warped classroom in monochrome colors and covered in flowers. Ayano sees the classroom from the sky as well, and seems to come to another realization; later encountering who appears to be Marry (in "Queen" form), while a physical snake (in snake form) appears above a then-leaning Ayano (as she leans in front of the also-kneeling Marry). Ayano would then go on to say (as she falls continuously, and seemingly not in person); "I'm sorry", "Sayonara", (lit. "goodbye" or "farewell"), and "Daisuki da yo" (lit: "I love you"), to who is indicated to be "Shintarō" (seen as he looked previously in the beginning of the "Lost Time Memory" music video, where he walked with Ayano down the street to their school).

=== Other characters ===
Kenjirō (ケンジロウ, Kenjirō) / Kenjirō Tateyama (楯山 研次朗, Tateyama Kenjirō)
Voiced by: Keiji Fujiwara
Kenjirō is the father of Ayano and husband of Ayaka. He was also Haruka and Takane's homeroom teacher and is Momo's tutor. His song is "Dead and Seek" (デッドアンドシーク).
He possesses the ability of 'Clearing Eyes' and seems to know about Medusae. When he was in university, he fell in love with Ayaka, who turned him down, not interested in such a pathetic man. This caused him to become much more hard working and taking studying more seriously. After that, he was able to marry Ayaka. Together they had Ayano and temporarily fostered Kido, Kano and Seto. Kenjirō was interested in the theory of Medusae and researched it with Ayaka, only to be caught in a landslide with her and die. He came in contact with the Heat Haze and was possessed by the snake of 'Clearing Eyes'. He became much more engrossed in research after Ayaka's death, eventually experimenting on and killing his two students (Takane and Haruka), this was done while possessed by the snake of 'Clearing Eyes'. His fate is that he dies and reunites with Ayaka in the Heat Haze; in Route XX, the snake of 'Clearing Eyes' (while it is possessing Konoha) kills him.
Hiyori (ヒヨリ, Hiyori) / Hiyori Asahina (朝比奈 日和, Asahina Hiyori)
Voiced by: Kotori Koiwai
Hiyori is a stubborn young girl from the countryside who yearns for the city. She is very popular at her school and has her own fan club. She drags Hibiya to the city with her in order to get Momo's autograph and stays at her sister's, Ayaka, house. She falls in love with Konoha who was staying there at the time. She becomes involved in a traffic accident and gets stuck in a time loop trying to save Hibiya, but while Hibiya successfully escapes the Heat Haze, she passes away. Despite her apparent pessimistic personality and constant insults she uses towards Hibiya, she truly cares about him. She seemingly thinks of him as an important person; since she never saw her distant older sister before her sister's death; and, because of her popularity that makes it harder for her to be friends with others. She appears in "Kagerou Daze" (カゲロウデイズ; "Heat Haze Daze") together with Hibiya, who mostly tells the song through his point of view, changing to Hiyori's only in the final verse. She also appears in "Konoha no Sekai Jijō" (コノハの世界事情; "Konoha's World Situation"), now witnessing Hibiya dying, while shocked and crying. Konoha tries to reach them both in time, but is unable to, as he is not visible physically at the time.
Shion (シオン, Shion) / Shion Kozakura (小桜 紫苑, Kozakura Shion)
Voiced by: Akemi Okamura
Shion is a 1/2 medusa and Marry's mother. When Shion was younger, she lived with her parents Azami and Tsukihiko. She loves Marry very much, and in order to protect her she refrains from letting Marry play outside. One day, Marry bypasses her mother's orders and plays outside anyway, however some boys come to attack her. She sacrifices herself in order to save Marry, and uses her eye power to turn the boys to stone; but the strain on her body was too much and she passes away with Marry.
She gets consumed by the Heat Haze and is given the 'Combining Eyes' ability, however she passes the power on to Marry and sends her to the outside world. Her song is "Gunjō Rain"群青レイン ("Ultramarine Rain").
Azami (アザミ, Azami) / Azami (薊)
Voiced by: Satomi Arai
Azami is a full medusa and Shion's mother. Snakes grow from her hair, each with a unique power. She once thought humans were 'dull creatures that die easily' but fell in love with a human named Tsukihiko and started a family. After realizing how short human lives were compared to her immortality, she goes away to use the power of the snakes to create a Never Ending World (The Heat Haze) where she could live with her family forever. It is currently unclear if she waited for her family to arrive in the Heat Haze, before realising that her husband would have died by then, or that when she returned, the villagers attacking her house made her revert to her original ideology, causing her to return to the Never-Ending World alone.
Many years later, her daughter and granddaughter, Shion and Marry were killed on August 15. Knowing this, she was unable to bear her grief and ordered the Heat Haze to "bring in every person who died on August 15", giving the ability of 'Combining Eyes' to Shion to allow her to return to life (who gave it to Marry). This causes her to lose control of the Heat Haze, thus drawing in every person who had died on August 15, the day Marry died, it is presumed that she died due to her power completely taken over by him and eventually suffocating to her death. Her body is later used by the Snake of The Clearing Eyes so that he might able to use her power to find a perfect vessel for him which is Konoha, In the end, she finally able to peacefully die with Shion by her side, finally freed from the torture she has been suffering for very many years. Her song is "Shinigami Record" (シニガミレコード; "Death-God Record").
Ayaka (アヤカ, Ayaka) / Ayaka Tateyama (楯山 絢香, Tateyama Ayaka)
Voiced by: Mako Hyōdō
Ayaka is Ayano's mother, Kenjirō's wife and Hiyori's sister. She became interested in the myth about Medusae and fell in love with Kenjirō at university. She gave birth to Ayano and temporarily fostered Kido, Kano and Seto from the orphanage after hearing about their strange abilities. She died in a landslide with Kenjirō while researching, passing on her trademark red clips to Ayano.
Tsukihiko (ツキヒコ, Tsukihiko)
Voiced by: Takehito Koyasu
A soldier who fell in love with Azami. Tsukihiko is a white haired, light-eyed man, and has long been considered a "monster" by the other villagers, due to his appearance. He tells Azami that he is also a "monster", and that they should spend their life together. Together, they had Shion and live peacefully until villagers attacked their home, mistakenly thinking he had been held captive. He is referred to by Azami in "Shinigami Record" (シニガミレコード; "Death-God Record") while also being seen with Azami and the younger Shion together in the music video for the song "Days".
Rin Kido (木戸 凛, Kido Rin)
Voiced by: Yuki Kaida
Tsubomi's older sister who died when their family home was burned down. She was directly killed by Kido's biological father, who also set the fire that killed them.
In "Mekakucity Actors", she would later encounter the young Tsubomi while Tsubomi is in the Daze, surrounded by "fire", Rin "speaking" to Tsubomi.
While Rin remains trapped in the Daze during most routes, she would also later appear briefly in the novels, as well as being referred to by Kido.
Black Konoha (黒コノハ, Kuro Konoha) / Snake of Clearing Eyes (目が冴える蛇, Me ga Saeru Hebi)
Voiced by: Mamoru Miyano
A snake who, seemingly previously as a "Wide Eyed Snake", suggested to Azami to create the Heat Haze. It is the true antagonist of the series.:Its songs are "Outer Science" (アウターサイエンス) (as himself) and "Dead and Seek" (デッドアンドシーク) (while formed in Kenjirō).
In many timelines, it took control of Kenjirō's body and survived under his wish of reuniting with his wife, going to extremes by doing so. Its true goal, however, is living forever. Also in many timelines, it transfers itself to Konoha's body and possesses it, causing Konoha's appearance to change into a "darker" look as well (wearing a full black version of Konoha's clothing, and with black hair).
In many timelines, it then kills all the members of the Mekakushi Dan besides Marry, and has her reset the timeline. This happens by means of her Combining Eyes ability, used through her by the snake of 'Clearing Eyes', who "awakens" her (often in "Queen" form), and, by "collecting" the snakes that "have lost their owners", she reverses time in order to save everyone. Marry seemingly reverses time at the end of every official "route" and "timeline" seen thus far.

== Media ==
=== CD / DVDs ===
The series began as a series of albums that were released alongside the novels. The soundtracks were produced by Jin and released by IA Project. The first album is titled Mekakucity Days (メカクシティデイズ, Mekakushiti Deizu) and was released on May 30, 2012. It was followed by a single, "Children Record" (チルドレンレコード, Chirudoren Rekōdo), on August 15, 2012. A second album titled Mekakucity Records (メカクシティレコーズ, Mekakushiti Rekōzu) was released on May 29, 2013. A third album titled Mekakucity Reload (メカクシティリロード, Mekakushiti Rirōdo) was announced on August 15, 2017 and was released November 7, 2018.

==== Songs ====
No.	Title
"Opening Theme"	"Children Record"; Transliteration: "Chirudoren Rekōdo" (Japanese: チルドレンレコード)
The opening song of the Kagerou Project. It quickly gained 1,000,000 views after its record release. It was released on a special DVD single. Currently, it has over 2.3 million views and is Jin's second most popular song (the other being "Kagerou Daze").
1	"Jinzō Enemy"; Transliteration: "Jinzō Enemī" (Japanese: 人造エネミー)
This song has reached over 700,000 views in Nico Nico Douga. Apart from being the first song in the series, it is also Shizen no Teki-P's first work. It tells the story of Ene, a cybergirl living in Shintarō's computer. However, Shintarō is a hikiNEET due to the grief of losing his close friend, Ayano Tateyama. Towards the end of the song, Shintarō attempts to kill Ene by "deleting" her as she has become a "toy that can only talk".
2	"Mekakushi Chord"; Transliteration: "Mekakushi Kōdo" (Japanese: メカクシコード)
The song has over 1,000,000 views on Nico Nico Douga. This is Kido's song, despite mostly being about the Dan rather than herself. This song used to be known as "Mekakushi Code", but was later called "Mekakushi Chord" in the "daze" PV and by official English translations of light novel and manga chapters named after the song. The song describes the Dan as a gang that Kido leads, with various different members ranging from cyber beings to 18-year-old (or otherwise) hikiNEETs. They too go on missions regularly, with some assistance from Kido's ability to "blindfold".
3	"Kagerou Daze"; Transliteration: "Kagerō Deizu" (Japanese: カゲロウデイズ)
This song was uploaded on September 30, 2011, and quickly gained in views, becoming Shizen no Teki-P's most popular song, and in turn the most popular song in the series. It has reached over 3,000,000 views in Nico Nico Douga. It also gave the Kagerou Project its name. This song was also featured in Hatsune Miku: Project DIVA F 2nd. On August 14 (at start), and (notably later) August 15, Hibiya and Hiyori are playing in the park, when they sight a black cat which Hiyori chases after, resulting in her death in a car accident and the two becoming trapped in a time loop that goes on for "decades". Hibiya then attempts to save Hiyori in vain, but when he finally succeeds, it is revealed that Hiyori will continue to try to save him – and vice versa.
4	"Headphone Actor"; Transliteration: "Heddofon Akutā" (Japanese: ヘッドフォンアクター)
The video of "Headphone Actor" reached over 1,500,000 views on Nico Nico Douga. On a normal day, the "country's president" announced that "the world was going to end", but by guidance of her future self (Ene), Takane (as her "Headphone Actor" character) was seemingly successfully able to escape as she still (as later implied in "Yesterday Evening"'s ending) had someone she needed to meet. However, upon reaching her destination, it is revealed to her by clapping scientists that she had "spent" her "life" in a "box". The scientist at her destination (implied to possibly be either Kenjirō, or Clearing Eyes as Kenjirō) congratulates her before "tossing a bomb", bombing the town, and implied killing her.
5	"Kūsō Forest"; Transliteration: "Kūsō Foresuto" (Japanese: 空想フォレスト)
This song has also received a million views on Nico Nico Douga, and is the first IA song to do so. It is also known as "Sōzō Forest" (想像フォレスト; "Imagination Forest"). It was later "remade" (with slight animation changes and fixes, and an updated ending that now showed Seto's "older" design) as "Kūsō Forest" instead of "Sōzō Forest", but it is still more commonly known by its previous name. The story of Marry is described, with her living alone and sheltered in a house, longing to go outside. Once, against her mother's warnings, she went out, and was bullied (leading to eventual torture), only to be saved by her Medusae mother who turned her attackers to stone, but died of (seemingly) the stress using her power caused. Later, a younger Seto chances upon her house, and recruits her to the Dan.
6	"Konoha no Sekai Jijō" (Japanese: コノハの世界事情)
This song has reached over 1,000,000 views on Nico Nico Douga, and is the first Miku Hatsune and IA duet to achieve that. It is also the third song in this series to do so. The video has currently reached over 1,500,000 views. An alternate point of view of "Kagerou Daze", this time from Konoha's. He is somehow dragged into the time loop as well, but as he is (seemingly) not meant to be there, he cannot do anything to stop Hiyori and Hibiya's countless deaths and feels helpless about it. The "Kagerou Project Perfect Guide" (2016) would later re-confirm it taking place alongside "Kagerou Daze" (at the same time) in the "Music Route" timeline.
7	"Kisaragi Attention"; Transliteration: "Kisaragi Atenshon" (Japanese: 如月アテンション)
This song quickly became popular after its music video release. It had over 100,000 views after only one day from its release. Momo is a popular idol who attempts to be normal for a day, but fails in doing so and causes a riot. This results in her crying in an alley, where Kido finds and recruits her to the Mekakushi Dan. After joining the Dan, she becomes much happier and begins learning to control her eye power.
?	"Shinigami Record"; Transliteration: "Shinigami Recōdo" (Japanese: シニガミレコード)
The song is featured on the Mekakucity Days (メカクシティデイズ) album. It tells Azami's story. A Medusae all alone, Azami was treated as a monster and found humans to be dull creatures due to their mortality. She was proven wrong upon meeting a young outcast, Tsukihiko, whom she eventually fell in love and had a family with. Knowing that he would someday die, she then created the Never-Ending World to make their time eternal, but he and her daughter seemingly refused to go with her.
?	"Dead and Seek"; Transliteration: "Deddo ando Shīku" (Japanese: デッドアンドシーク)
The song is featured on the Mekakucity Days (メカクシティデイズ) album. It tells Kenjirō's story. Ever since Ayaka (and later, Ayano's) deaths, Kenjirō's sanity has been slowly decreasing, to the extent that he began experimenting on his students (Haruka and Takane), and became despairing. It is suggested that he may have had a part to play in Heat Haze (especially with Clearing Eyes' later noted involvements around the same timeframes).
?	"Ene no Dennō Kikō" (Japanese: エネの電脳紀行)
The song is featured on the Mekakucity Days (メカクシティデイズ) album, though never received a music video. A song that connects (story-wise) right after "Headphone Actor". A story about Ene who lost her human body and lives now in the cyber world.
?	"Tōmei Answer"; Transliteration: "Tōmei Ansā" (Japanese: 透明アンサー)
Nicovideo broadcast is not available because the music video was originally meant to be exclusive to the album Mekakucity Days. A person who uploaded the video onto Nico Nico Douga was posing as Jin, though it was revealed to be fake later on. Shintarō, who developed an apathetic outlook towards life, was encouraged by his deskmate, Ayano. However, she later committed suicide, and the trauma of losing her caused him to become a hikiNEET.
8	"Gunjō Rain"; Transliteration: "Gunjō Rein" (Japanese: 群青レイン)
The song was released on the DVD single "Children Record" (チルドレンレコード). It got an extra bonus manga chapter adaptation in the limited edition release of Mekakucity Records (メカクシティレコーズ). Shion, as Marry's mother, hopes that the rain will never stop so that Marry will never be able to go outside, as she is aware of the dangers of the outside world due to their status as Medusae. As she dies, however, she regrets not telling Marry how much she loved her and hopes that she will get to see the outside world someday.
9	"Yobanashi Deceive"; Transliteration: "Yobanashi Diseibu" (Japanese: 夜咄ディセイブ)
Jin announced Yobanashi Deceive several months before its publication and finished it in January 2013. In an interview he stated that the song goes from blues, to over funk, to rock. After being released on February 17, 2013, also the same day the project was started two years ago, it quickly hit 100,000 views in just one night. Kano's song. He begins talking with the listener about a story of a boy who became a "monster" who always lied, being able to even shapeshift into some other forms (such as a female form), but lost sight of his true heart after being buried under so many "lies". He, however, claims this all to be "a made-up story", bowing to the viewer at the end.
10	"Lost Time Memory"; Transliteration: "Rosu Taimu Memorī" (Japanese: ロスタイムメモリー)
In this song, it reveals that Ayano's death opened extra spinoff "Routes" for the Dan. In Route 1, Shintarō meets the Dan and saves Black Konoha (Clearing Eyes) from committing suicide, instead dying for him; and meeting Ayano, who gives him the "Favoring Eyes" and eventually (seemingly) leads to Summertime Record. In Route XX, Shintarō continues to grieve over Ayano, eventually killing Ene and committing suicide, and failing to reach Ayano, which leads to Outer Science-like endings.
11	"Ayano no Kōfuku Riron" (Japanese: アヤノの幸福理論)
Kido, Seto and Kano are temporarily fostered by the Tateyama family, and Ayano, as the "big sister" ("onee-chan"), forms the Mekakushi Dan to try to make them happy. However, after Ayaka's death, Kenjirō gradually descends into madness and when Ayano discovers him experimenting on and killing Haruka and Takane, she fears for her family and friends' safety, and commits suicide in order to enter the Heat Haze; and get an eye ability to help save her family and friends.
?	"Shōnen Brave"; Transliteration: "Shōnen Bureibu" (Japanese: 少年ブレイブ)
Jin announced a music video to be released shortly after the last album was published, but it was cancelled due to heavy spoilers the video would have contained. The music video was included in Mekakucity V's; a screening of the video was held in Tokyo, Nagoya and Osaka on December 25, 2013. As a child, Seto was frail and therefore bullied, resulting in his only friend being a dog, with whom he wished to be able to understand. However, he drowned trying to save the dog, thereby receiving the "Stealing Eyes". Being able to read minds made him decide to escape to a secluded place without any thoughts, where he met Marry in the forest.
?	"Otsukimi Recital"; Transliteration: "Otsukimi Risaitaru" (Japanese: オツキミリサイタル)
After posted by Jin, this video quickly became the first in the Nico Nico Douga ranking. After Hiyori's death, Hibiya is significantly affected, and Momo attempts to cheer him up through various means; the two, as well, slowly becoming closer.
?	"Yūkei Yesterday"; Transliteration: "Yūkei Iesutadei" (Japanese: 夕景イエスタデイ)
The song is about Takane and Haruka when they were human, before their later deaths; and how Takane had a crush on Haruka.
"Final"	"Outer Science"; Transliteration: "Autā Saiensu" (Japanese: アウターサイエンス)
Outer Science is known as a "bad end" of the story. The snake of 'Clearing Eyes' possesses Konoha and kills everyone, leading Marry to use 'Combining Eyes' to turn back time. Because of this, the Snake of 'Clearing Eyes' calls Marry the "Queen" of the tragedy. The song is told from 'Clearing Eyes' point of view.
"Music Route Final Chapter"	"Marry no Kakū Sekai"; Transliteration: "Marī no Kakū Sekai" (Japanese: マリーの架空世界)
The song tells about Marry's feelings when endlessly repeating the Never-Ending world. At the very end of near every "Route", and often after 'Clearing Eyes' kills everyone (and even heavily implied otherwise), Marry turns back time, seemingly in order to try to always be with her friends.
"Ending Theme"	"Summertime Record"; Transliteration: "Samātaimu Recōdo" (Japanese: サマータイムレコード)
The song is the official "ending theme" and last song and music video of the overall project. The song tells what (seemingly) happens with Mekakushi Dan and with the characters after the end of the story. A seeming "good end", it describes how the Dan comes back together again after everything is over and they have (seemingly) lost their eye powers. However, having grown up and become "adults", they can hardly remember themselves and each other from their times in the Dan anymore. They say goodbye to each other, and if they can remember; maybe they will all meet again. However, in the "Kagerou Project Perfect Guide" (2016), multiple more "Routes" and otherwise timelines were confirmed; "Mekakucity Actors" (which contained this song) stated to be one of the "Routes", which may have been "repeated" after all; heavily implying more potential "Routes" were to come.
?	"Daze"; Transliteration: "deizu" (Japanese: デイズ)
The opening theme for the "Mekakucity Actors" anime. It is sung by singer MARiA from GARNiDELiA and composed by Shizen no Teki-P/Jin. It would later contain a "lyrics" "music video", also illustrated and directed by Sidu, displaying the various characters with stylized lyrics and imagery. Some in-between frames for the music video give "hints" for the deeper underlying plot of the story.
?	"Days"; Transliteration: "deizu" (Japanese: デイズ)
The ending theme for the "Mekakucity Actors" anime. It is sung by Lia, who also provided her voice for the Vocaloid IA, commonly used by Jin to make Kagerou Project songs. The song was composed by Shizen no Teki-P/Jin. In the ending theme for the anime, illustrated by Sidu, Hiyori Asahina sits alone in a dark subway car, as the rest of the Mekakushi Dan slowly begin appearing around her, everyone in shadows. Most of the members appear to be sleeping, with Shintaro and some others keeping watch. The first one to appear by Hiyori's side is Hibiya Amamiya, sleeping against her in a similar fashion to an earlier scene from the end of "Konoha's World Situation", though the Hiyori here seems less natural, and more composed; a small, peaceful smile on her face the entire time. Konoha, as well, would soon appear sleeping against her other side. Suddenly, everyone around her vanishes, revealing Hiyori appearing to be alone; as she soon quickly fades away herself. An official music video (also illustrated by Sidu) was also later released, this time showing Azami surrounded by her family, husband Tsukihiko and daughter Shion, in a much brighter looking subway car. However, as the video goes on, "glitch"-like things begin happening, and her family soon disappears. Azami begins crying as the imagery becomes somewhat darker. Suddenly, she opens her eyes, only to see a view of Hiyori Asahina in the subway car, surrounded by her sleeping (or otherwise) friends; the same as shown in the "Mekakucity Actors" ending theme. It is unknown which one exactly sings the song (and may be both, in their different versions), also as Azami's version referenced the earlier Hiyori's/Mekakucity Actors' version. However, the lyrics appear to relate to both characters.
?	"RED"; Transliteration: "Reddo" (Japanese: レッド)
The opening theme song for "-in a day's-" performed by GOUACHE, a band that Jin is a part of. The music video is a compilation video directed by Toushi Atsunori. The song was released on November 4, 2016. The song has a theme of "Red" and speaks of how "Summer's come to take the place of yesterday".
?	"Shissō Word"; Transliteration: "Shissō Wādo" (Japanese: 失想ワアド)
The song is about Tsubomi Kido's experience growing up. It's the first song known of Mekakucity Reload, and the first song off it to gain a music video.
?	"Remind Blue"; Transliteration: "Remind Blue"
The song is someone singing about what seems to be the "end" of summer, while speaking to the person they seemingly like/love, but...? The singer is currently unknown; but presumed to be a/one of the boys/males who uses the personal Japanese pronoun of "boku". (The only known ones to do so thus far are: Hibiya, Haruka, and/or Seto.) It's the second song known of Mekakucity Reload. Before Mekakucity Reload's release, Jin previewed the song on August 15, 2018; Kagerou Project's anniversary date; personally providing the vocals for the song and playing it himself.
?	"Additional Memory"; Transliteration: "Adishonaru Memorī" (Japanese: アディショナルメモリー)
The song is about Ayano Tateyama's suicide; and what happens after it. It's the third song known of Mekakucity Reload, and the second song off it to gain a music video.
?	"Song of Friends / A Song of My Friend"; Transliteration: "Tomodachi no Uta / Tomodachi no Uta Radio Ver." (Japanese: 友達の唄 Radio Ver. (Tomodachi no Uta Radio Ver.))
Bundled as a "bonus song" with the release of the "Mekakucity Talkers" Volume 1 spinoff book. Momo Kisaragi sings this song in-character, with a performance provided by her voice actor, Nanami Kashiyama. It is the very first song to be originally shown as sung by a character's official voice actor. It was officially described by the book's promotions (which were re-tweeted by Jin's official Twitter) as being a "love song" sung by Momo Kisaragi.
?	"Imaginary Reload"
?	"My Funny Weekend"
?	"Lost Day Hour"
?	"Fireworks In The Summer End"
?	"Lost Time Prologue"
?	"Kaien Panzermast"
?	"Summer Endroll"
?	"Crying Prologue"
?	"Ever Youth Roadshow"
?	"Goodbye Summer Wars"

=== Light novels ===
The Kagerou Daze light novels are written by Jin with illustrations from Kagerou Project music video maker Sidu. The first volume was released on May 30, 2012, by Enterbrain on their KCG Bunko imprint, and the eighth and final volume was released on December 29, 2017. Yen Press has been releasing the novels in English in North America since May 26, 2015.

No.	Title	Original release date	English release date
1	Kagerou Daze I -in a daze- カゲロウデイズ ‐in a daze‐	May 30, 2012; 978-4-04-728059-5	May 26, 2015; 978-0-316-25947-7
"Kagerou Daze I" (カゲロウデイズ, Kagerō Deizu); "Jinzou Enemy" (人造エネミー, Jinzō Enemī); "Kagerou Daze II" (カゲロウデイズII, Kagerō Deizu II); "Kisaragi Attention" (如月アテンション, Kisaragi Atenshon); "Kagerou Daze III" (カゲロウデイズIII, Kagerō Deizu III); "Mekakushi Chord" (メカクシコード, Mekakushi Kōdo); "Epilogue" (エピローグ, Epirōgu)
The hikiNEET Shintarō Kisaragi and Ene, the cyber being living in his computer, are introduced. After he ventures out to a nearby department store for a replacement keyboard, he gets caught up in a terrorist plot. Halfway through the novel, the point of view swaps to his sister, Momo Kisaragi, and tells her story of how she met the Mekakushi Dan.
2	Kagerou Daze II -a headphone actor- カゲロウデイズII -a headphone actor-	September 29, 2012; 978-4-04-728339-8	September 22, 2015; 978-0-316-34204-9
"Headphone Actor I" (ヘッドフォンアクターI, Heddofon Akutā I); "Yūkei Yesterday I" (夕景イエスタデイI, Yūkei Iesutadei I); "Headphone Actor II" (ヘッドフォンアクターII, Heddofon Akutā II); "Yūkei Yesterday II" (夕景イエスタデイII, Yūkei Iesutadei II); "Headphone Actor III" (ヘッドフォンアクターIII, Heddofon Akutā III); "Yūkei Yesterday III" (夕景イエスタデイIII, Yūkei Iesutadei III); "Headphone Actor IV" (ヘッドフォンアクターIV, Heddofon Akutā IV); "Retrospect Forest" (追想フォレスト, Tsuisō Foresuto)
Takane Enomoto and her high school life with Haruka Kokonose is shown.
3	Kagerou Daze III -the children reason- カゲロウデイズIII -the children reason-	May 30, 2013; 978-4-04-728944-4	January 26, 2016; 978-0-316-30875-5
"Konoha's World Situation" (コノハの世界事情, Konoha no Sekai Jijō); "Kagerou Daze 01" (カゲロウデイズ01, Kagerō Deizu 01); "Children Record 1" (チルドレンレコード1, Chirudoren Rekōdo 1); "Kagerou Daze 02" (カゲロウデイズ02, Kagerō Deizu 02); "Children Record 2" (チルドレンレコード2, Chirudoren Rekōdo 2); "Kagerou Daze 03" (カゲロウデイズ03, Kagerō Deizu 03); "Moonshine Recital" (オツキミリサイタル, Otsukimi Risaitaru); "Kagerou Daze IV" (カゲロウデイズIV, Kagerō Deizu IV); "Kaien Panzermast" (カイエンパンザマスト, Kaien Panzamasuto)
Hibiya Amamiya and how Mekakushi Dan came to meet him is the focus.
4	Kagerou Daze IV -the missing children- カゲロウデイズIV -the missing children-	August 30, 2013; 978-4-04-729099-0	July 19, 2016; 978-0-316-30876-2
"Shinigami Record I" (シニガミレコードI, Shinigami Rekōdo I); "Children Record III" (チルドレンレコードIII, Chirudoren Rekōdo III); "Shinigami Record II" (シニガミレコードII, Shinigami Rekōdo II); "Children Record IV" (チルドレンレコードIV, Chirudoren Rekōdo IV); "Shinigami Record III" (シニガミレコードIII, Shinigami Rekōdo III); "Children Record V" (チルドレンレコードV, Chirudoren Rekōdo V); "Shinigami Record IV" (シニガミレコードIV, Shinigami Rekōdo IV); "Children Record VI" (チルドレンレコードVI, Chirudoren Rekōdo VI); "Headphone Actor V" (ヘッドフォンアクターV, Heddofon Akutā V)
Azami's past and her meeting with Tsukihiko is shown. It also shows Shintarō's adventures with Mekakushi Dan and exploring the mysteries of their eye powers.
5	Kagerou Daze V -the deceiving- カゲロウデイズV -the deceiving-	March 29, 2014; 978-4-04-729530-8	September 27, 2016; 978-0-316-54528-0
"Yobanashi Deceive 0" (夜咄ディセイブ0, Yobanashi Diseibu 0); "One Day, on a Roof" (或る日の屋上にて, Aruhi no Okujō Nite); "Yobanashi Deceive 1" (夜咄ディセイブ1, Yobanashi Diseibu 1); "Yobanashi Deceive 2" (夜咄ディセイブ2, Yobanashi Diseibu 2); "Yobanashi Deceive 3" (夜咄ディセイブ3, Yobanashi Diseibu 3); "Yobanashi Deceive 4" (夜咄ディセイブ4, Yobanashi Diseibu 4); "One Day, on the Street" (或る日の路上にて, Aruhi no Rojō Nite); "Yobanashi Deceive 5" (夜咄ディセイブ5, Yobanashi Diseibu 5); "Today, on the Street" (今日という日の路上にて, Kyō to Iu Hi no Rojō Nite)
The original Mekakushi Dan with Ayano Tateyama is a focus and reveals more about Shūya Kano's involvement in the plot.
6	Kagerou Daze VI -over the dimension- カゲロウデイズVI ‐over the dimension‐	March 30, 2015; 978-4-04-730326-3	January 31, 2017; 978-0-316-46664-6
"Daze1"; "Lost Days – 1"; "Lost Days – 2"; "Lost Days – 3"; "Lost Days – 4"; "Lost Days – 5"; "Lost Days – 6"; "Lost Days – 7"; "Daze2"
Haruka Kokonose's point of view is shown.
7	Kagerou Daze VII -from the darkness- カゲロウデイズVII -from the darkness-	August 29, 2016; 978-4-04-730745-2	July 25, 2017; 978-0-316-43964-0
"Children Record -side No.1 (1)-" (チルドレンレコード side-No.1-（1）, Chirudoren Rekōdo side-No.1- (1)); "Blankmind Words 1" (失想ワアド1, Shissō Wādo 1); "Blankmind Words 2" (失想ワアド2, Shissō Wādo 2); "Children Record -side No.7-" (チルドレンレコード side-No.7-, Chirudoren Rekōdo side-No.7-); "Blankmind Words 3" (失想ワアド3, Shissō Wādo 3); "Children Record -side No.5-" (チルドレンレコード side-No.5-, Chirudoren Rekōdo side-No.5-); "Blankmind Words 4" (失想ワアド4, Shissō Wādo 4); "Children Record -side No.3-" (チルドレンレコード side-No.3-, Chirudoren Rekōdo side-No.3-); "Blankmind Words 5" (失想ワアド5, Shissō Wādo 5); "Children Record -side No.1 (2)-" (チルドレンレコード side-No.1- (2), Chirudoren Rekōdo side-No.1- (2)); "Blankmind Words 6" (失想ワアド6, Shissō Wādo 6); "Children Record -side No.1 (3)-" (チルドレンレコード side-No.1- (3), Chirudoren Rekōdo side-No.1- (3)); "Shinigami Record V" (シニガミレコードV, Shinigami Rekōdo V); "Children Record -side No.0-" (チルドレンレコード side-No.0-, Chirudoren Rekōdo side-No.0-)
Tsubomi Kido's history comes to light.
8	Kagerou Daze VIII -summer time reload- カゲロウデイズVIII -summer time reload-	December 29, 2017; 978-4-04-734622-2	December 11, 2018; 978-1-9753-2911-2
"Crying Prologue" (クライングプロローグ, Kuraingu Purorōgu); "Summertime Record -side No.8-" (サマータイムレコード side-No.8-, Samātaimu Rekōdo side-No.8-); "Children Record -side No.8- " (チルドレンレコード side-No.8-, Chirudoren Rekōdo side-No.8-); "Summertime Record -side No.6-" (サマータイムレコード side-No.6-, Samātaimu Rekōdo side-No.6-); "Children Record -side No.3(2)- " (チルドレンレコード side-No.3(2)-, Chirudoren Rekōdo side-No.3(2)-); "Summertime Record -side No.2-" (サマータイムレコード side-No.2-, Samātaimu Rekōdo side-No.2-); "Children Record -side No.9- " (チルドレンレコード side-No.9-, Chirudoren Rekōdo side-No.9-); "Summertime Record -side No.2(2)-" (サマータイムレコード side-No.2(2)-, Samātaimu Rekōdo side-No.2(2)-); "Children Record -side No.7-" (チルドレンレコード side-No.7-, Chirudoren Rekōdo side-No.7-); "Summertime Record -side No.2(3)-" (サマータイムレコード side-No.2(3)-, Samātaimu Rekōdo side-No.2(3)-); "Summertime Record -side No.9-" (サマータイムレコード side-No.9-, Samātaimu Rekōdo side-No.9-); "Summertime Record -side No.2(4)-" (サマータイムレコード, Samātaimu Rekōdo side-No.2(4)-); "Summertime Record -side No.10-" (サマータイムレコード side-No.10-, Samātaimu Rekōdo side-No.10-); "Summertime Record -side No.7-" (サマータイムレコード side-No.7-, Samātaimu Rekōdo side-No.7-); "Marry's Fictional World" (マリーの架空世界, Marī no Kakū Sekai)

There is an anthology series called Mekakushi Dan: Watchers (メカクシ団:ウォッチャーズ, Mekakushi Dan: Uotchāzu) that is made up of short stories from a Pixiv contest.

No.	Title	Japanese release date	Japanese ISBN
1	Mekakushi Dan: Watchers Anthology -Ahōshitsu Shōjo o Meguru Hito Natsu no Bōkentan- (メカクシ団:ウォッチャーズ アンソロジー -消失少女をめぐるひと夏の冒険譚-)	December 26, 2014	978-4-04-730186-3
2	Mekakushi Dan: Watchers Novel -Shōjo no Kimochi to Bokura no Chikara- (メカクシ団:ウォッチャーズ ノベル -少女のキモチとぼくらのチカラ-)	February 28, 2015	978-4-04-730187-0
3	Mekakushi Dan: Watchers Replay -Shōshitsu Shōjo Sōsaku dai Sakusen Re;PLAY- (メカクシ団:ウォッチャーズ リプレイ -消失少女捜索大作戦 Re;PLAY-)	February 28, 2015	978-4-04-730188-7

There is a novel anthology series named Kagerou Daze Novel Anthology (カゲロウデイズノベルアンソロジー, Kagerō Deizu Noberu Ansorojī) made from other Pixiv competitions.

No.	Japanese release date	Japanese ISBN
1	January 30, 2015	978-4-04-730255-6
2	March 30, 2015	978-4-04-730308-9

=== Manga ===
The Kagerou Daze manga is illustrated by Mahiro Satou. It began serialization in Media Factory's Monthly Comic Gene on June 15, 2012. The first tankōbon volume was released on November 27, 2012; thirteen volumes have been released as of March 27, 2019. Yen Press will release the manga in English in North America, with the first volume released on April 21, 2015.

No.	Original release date	Original ISBN	English release date	English ISBN
1	November 27, 2012	978-4-8401-4762-0	April 21, 2015	978-0-316-25949-1
01 Jinzou Enemy I; 02 Jinzou Enemy II; 03 Kisaragi Attention; 04 Mekakushi Chord I
2	March 27, 2013	978-4-8401-5039-2	July 21, 2015	978-0-316-34619-1
05 Mekakushi Chord II; 06 Mekakushi Chord III; 07 Mekakushi Chord IV; 08 Retrospect Forest; 09 Headphone Actor I
3	August 27, 2013	978-4-8401-5316-4	October 27, 2015	978-0-316-34620-7
10 Yuukei Yesterday I; 11 Yuukei Yesterday II; 12 Yuukei Yesterday III; 13 Yuukei Yesterday IV; 14 Headphone Actor II
4	March 27, 2014	978-4-04-066513-9	January 19, 2016	978-0-316-26997-1
15 Yuukei Yesterday V; 16 Headphone Actor III; 17 Headphone Actor IV; 18 Kagerou Daze I; 19 Kagerou Daze II
5	June 27, 2014	978-4-04-066595-5	April 19, 2016	978-0-316-27019-9
20 Kagerou Daze III; 21 Kagerou Daze IV; 22 Kagerou Daze V; 23 Kagerou Daze VI; 24 Shounen Brave I
6	December 27, 2014	978-4-04-067234-2	July 16, 2016	978-0-316-27022-9
25 Shounen Brave II; 26 Shounen Brave III; 27 Fantasy Forest I; 28 Fantasy Forest II; 29 Fantasy Forest III; 30 Kaien Panzermast I
7	June 27, 2015	978-4-04-067544-2	October 25, 2016	978-0-316-54535-8
31 Shinigami Record I; 32 Shinigami Record II; 33 Shinigami Record III; 34 Shinigami Record IV; 35 Shinigami Record V; 36 Shinigami Record VI
8	March 26, 2016	978-4-04-068235-8	December 19, 2017	978-0-316-41407-4
37 Shinigami Record VII; 38 Children Record I; 39 Children Record II; 40 Children Record III; 41 Yobanashi Deceive I; 42 Yobanashi Deceive II
9	March 27, 2017	978-4-04-069094-0	April 17, 2018	978-0-316-52124-6
43 Yobanashi Deceive III; 44 Yobanashi Deceive IV; 45 Ayano's Theory of Happiness I; 46 Ayano's Theory of Happiness II; 47 Ayano's Theory of Happiness III; 48 Red
10	October 27, 2017	978-4-04-069475-7	June 12, 2018	978-1-9753-2751-4
49 Lost Daze I; 50 Lost Daze II; 51 Lost Daze III; 52 Lost Daze IV; 53 Lost Daze V; 54 Lost Daze VI
11	March 27, 2018	978-4-04-069761-1	December 11, 2018	978-1-9753-2908-2
55 Additional Memory I; 56 Additional Memory II; 57 Additional Memory III; 58 Additional Memory IV; 59 Red II
12	September 27, 2018	978-4-04-065113-2	April 30, 2019	978-1-9753-0415-7
60 Red III; 61 Red IV; 62 No Title; 63 Additional Memory V; 64 Imaginary Reload I
13	March 27, 2019	978-4-04-065585-7	November 12, 2019	978-1-9753-5955-3
65 Imaginary Reload II; 66 Imaginary Reload III; 67 Imaginary Reload IV; 68 Imaginary Reload V; 69 Mekakucity Actors; Additional Memory

There is also an ongoing anthology series called Kagerou Daze Official Anthology Comic (カゲロウデイズ公式アンソロジーコミック, Kagerō Deizu Kōshiki Ansorojī Komikku) and each volume goes with a certain theme. It is written and illustrated by various people including Kagerou Daze light novel artist and music video creator Sidu, the Kagerou Daze manga artist Mahiro Satou, and Kagerou Project music video creator Wannyanpu (わんにゃんぷー, Wannyanpū).

No.	Title	Japanese release date	Japanese ISBN
1	Kagerou Daze Official Anthology Comic -Upper- (カゲロウデイズ公式アンソロジーコミック-UPPER-)	January 26, 2013	978-4-04-066267-1
2	Kagerou Daze Official Anthology Comic -Downer- (カゲロウデイズ公式アンソロジーコミック-DOWNER-)	March 27, 2013	978-4-8401-4795-8
3	Kagerou Daze Official Anthology Comic -Summer- (カゲロウデイズ公式アンソロジーコミック-SUMMER-)	July 27, 2013	978-4-04-066533-7
4	Kagerou Daze Official Anthology Comic -Winter- (カゲロウデイズ公式アンソロジーコミック-WINTER-)	November 27, 2013	978-4-04-066130-8
5	Kagerou Daze Official Anthology Comic -Spring- (カゲロウデイズ公式アンソロジーコミック-SPRING-)	March 27, 2014	978-4-04-066514-6
6	Kagerou Daze Official Anthology Comic -Bitter- (カゲロウデイズ公式アンソロジーコミック-BITTER-)	July 26, 2014	978-4-04-066826-0
7	Kagerou Daze Official Anthology Comic -Sweet- (カゲロウデイズ公式アンソロジーコミック-SWEET-)	November 27, 2014	978-4-04-067210-6
8	Kagerou Daze Official Anthology Comic -Spicy- (カゲロウデイズ公式アンソロジーコミック-SPICY-)	March 27, 2015	978-4-04-067508-4
9	Kagerou Daze Official Anthology Comic -Fantasy- (カゲロウデイズ公式アンソロジーコミック-FANTASY-)	August 27, 2015	978-4-04-067581-7
10	Kagerou Daze Official Anthology Comic -Remember- (カゲロウデイズ公式アンソロジーコミック-REMEMBER-)	November 27, 2015	978-4-04-067853-5
11	Kagerou Daze Official Anthology Comic -Future- (カゲロウデイズ公式アンソロジーコミック-FUTURE-)	March 26, 2016	978-4-04-068236-5

=== Anime ===
A Kagerou Project anime titled Mekakucity Actors (メカクシティアクターズ), directed by Akiyuki Shinbo and produced by Shaft, began airing on April 12, 2014. The anime adaptation starring Kana Asumi as Ene, Kana Hanazawa as Mary, and Mamoru Miyano as Konoha. This is the first voice-acting of Asumi since her marriage on January 14, 2014. The teaser website of the anime series was launched on January 17, 2014. The anime has been licensed for streaming by Aniplex of America. The opening theme is "Daze" sung by Jin feat. Maria from Garnidelia and the ending theme is "Days" by Jin feat. Lia. For episode six, the opening insert song is "Headphone Actor" (ヘッドフォンアクター) and the ending insert song is "Yūkei Yesterday" (夕景イエスタデイ); both songs are performed by Jin feat. LiSA. For episode eight, the ending insert song is "Lost Time Memory" (ロスタイムメモリー) sung by Jin feat. Kōta Matsuyama from Byee the Round. For episode nine, the opening insert song is "Ayano no Kōfuku Riron" (アヤノの幸福理論) sung by Jin feat. Aki Okui. All songs are composed by Jin.

A Kagerou Project short anime film titled Kagerou Daze -in a day's- (カゲロウデイズ-in a day's-) was directed by Sidu and produced by Studio Jumonji. It was produced with MX4D presentation in mind and premiered on November 4, 2016. The opening theme is "Red" by Gouache, a band Jin is a part of.

A Kagerou Project anime titled Mekakucity Reload (メカクシティリロード) was announced at the Seek at Mekakucity event on August 15, 2016.
