= Phonobase Music Services =

- Founded: 2007
- Founder: Juliano Polimeno
- Genre: Various
- Country of origin: Brazil
- Location: Rua Cotoxó, 419, sala 4 - Perdizes - 05021-000 - São Paulo / SP (map)
- Official website: www.phonobase.com

Phonobase Music Services is a Brazilian music services company and record label founded in 2007.

In 2008, the company develops an innovative music marketing strategy for the release of “Pareço Moderno”, second album from the band Cérebro Eletrônico. The album was released in multiple formats - from a special pack to single MP3 tracks - and an exclusive EP was freely distributed to more than 50 music blogs and sites.

In 2009, the company builds a Fan-To-Fan platform for the album "Terrorist!?" of Jumbo Elektro, allowing fans to sell the album in custom web pages and gain a percentage of the revenue.

== Artists/Clients ==
- Cérebro Eletrônico
- Jumbo Elektro
- Druques
- Fabio Góes
- Luísa Maita (management/booking)
- Passo Torto (booking)
