= Góes =

Góes or Góis is a Portuguese surname. Notable people with the surname include:

- Allan Góes (born 1971), Brazilian mixed martial artist
- Eduardo de Góes "Edu" Lobo (born 1943), Brazilian bossa nova singer
- João Pedro Góes (born 1998), Brazilian politician
- Júlio Góes (born 1955), Brazilian tennis player
- Fabio Góes (born 1975), Brazilian songwriter
- Pedro Aurélio de Góis Monteiro (1889–1956), Brazilian general and politician
- Silvestre Péricles de Góis Monteiro (1896–1972), Brazilian soldier and politician
- Waldez Góes (born 1961), Brazilian politician
