= Kurapika =

Fictional character from Hunter × Hunter manga

- Hunter × Hunter character
- Kurapika, as illustrated by Yoshihiro Togashi
- First appearance: Hunter × Hunter manga chapter 2: "An Encounter in the Storm" (1998)
- Created by: Yoshihiro Togashi
- Voiced by: Japanese: Yuki Kaida (1999 anime); Miyuki Sawashiro (2011 anime); English: Cheryl McMaster (1999 anime); Erika Harlacher (2011 anime)

Kurapika (Japanese: クラピカ) is a fictional character from Yoshihiro Togashi's manga series Hunter × Hunter. Kurapika is the last remaining member of the Kurta Clan (クルタ族, Kuruta-zoku) who wishes to become a Hunter in order to avenge his clan and recover their scarlet-glowing eyes that were plucked from their corpses by a band of thieves known as the Phantom Troupe. In the series's first story arc, he befriends the protagonist and Hunter participant Gon Freecss after having a fight with Leorio Paradinight. After many trials together, Gon and his friends end up passing the exam. In hunting the Troupe, Kurapika learns of his Nen, a Qi-like life energy used by its practitioners to manifest parapsychological abilities, which he specifically develops for his revenge quest. Kurapika has additionally appeared in the 2013 movie Hunter × Hunter: Phantom Rouge, which further expands his backstory and revenge mission. He is also a supporting character in the film Hunter × Hunter: The Last Mission, where he briefly reunites with his new friends in an arena.

Togashi was inspired by the Nausicaä of the Valley of the Wind manga and Japanese singer Takanori Nishikawa when creating Kurapika. However, the author had trouble telling Kurapika's entire backstory, which led to the production of the first 2013 animated movie focused on it. Multiple voice actors provided their talent for Kurapika's portrayal in the series's animated adaptations.

Critical response to Kurapika's character has been positive due to his constant changes between his quest for revenge and friendship. He was also praised for maintaining a calm and friendly personality when it comes to his friends as well as his darker side when dealing with his past.

== Creation ==
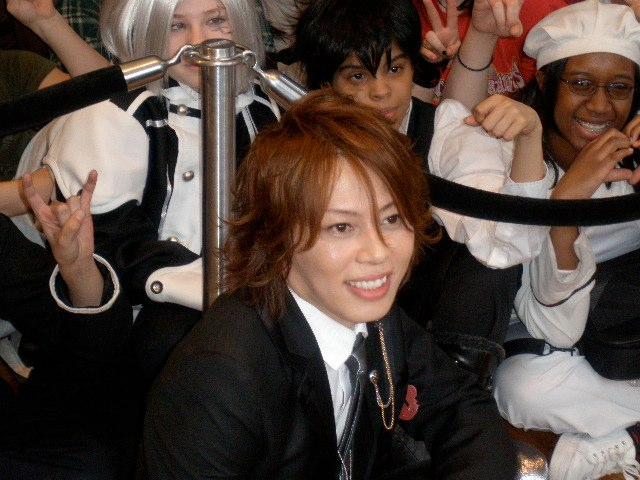
Takanori Nishikawa inspired Kurapika's appearance.

According to manga author Yoshihiro Togashi, Kurapika was inspired by the Ohmu creatures in Hayao Miyazaki's Nausicaä of the Valley of the Wind film; though they are ordinarily docile, killing any insect in the forest will drive any nearby Ohmu into a berserk rage, signified by their eyes changing to bright red as opposed to blue when they are calm, in a similar fashion to Kurapika's eyes that become red when suffering rage. The character's appearance was based on the Japanese singer Takanori Nishikawa, with Togashi doing a technique called "archaic smile", as he wanted to give the character a mysterious smile, which often makes him easier to illustrate.

In dealing with the cast's abilities, Togashi had the idea of having them connect with their personalities, such as Kurapika's chains, which are connected with his tragic backstory. Originally, the series's plot would involve the usage of trading cards as main weapons. However, similarities with Kazuki Takahashi's Yu-Gi-Oh! manga led to this being scrapped.

In the first animated adaptation of Hunter x Hunter by Nippon Animation, the staff was catching up to the printed adaptation and thus planned their own original ending. In this original scenario, Kurapika dies as he destroys the Phantom Troupe enemies as he breaks the laws of his own abilities, which cost his life in the process. Togashi did not like this scenario, and it was scrapped, resulting in the series being followed by original video animations that follow Kurapika's fights against the Troupe more faithfully to the manga.

The first film's plot from 2013, Hunter × Hunter: Phantom Rouge, centers around Kurapika's arc. It is based on an unpublished story creator Togashi wrote around 10 years earlier. Togashi was asked about how they came up with the idea of Kurapika's Past Events, which was during the Phantom Troupe arc of the manga. Around volume 10 of the manga, Togashi came up with new ideas to further expand Kurapika's character and how to connect it with the Troupe. However, the schedule with the next story arcs made it difficult to write it. He said he started the project without expecting it to be tiring. He completed Kurapika's part quickly but had to stop due to different events. This led to Togashi writing a one-shot about Kurapika's childhood to connect it with the 2013 movie years later. Although Phantom Rouge does not end Kurapika's story arc, Togashi has suggested that the character might die alongside the Troupe in future events.

The character is voiced by Yuki Kaida in the 1999 series and Miyuki Sawashiro in the 2011 series in Japanese. For English adaptations, he is voiced by Cheryl McMaster in the 1999 series and Erika Harlacher in the remake. Kaida said she was a fan of Kurapika, saying he has a logical personality, leading to several scenes with explanations but avoiding falling too bored. She still feels Kurapika is too stubborn sometimes and gets too serious and considered his revenge quest to make him a "samurai blond". Harlacher voices Kurapika in the second anime adaptation in English. In retrospect, she was pleased with her work's legacy, showing interest mainly in her character's fight with the Phantom Troupe.

== Appearances ==
=== In Hunter × Hunter ===
In Hunter × Hunter, Kurapika is introduced the sole survivor of the Kurta Clan, a race with treasured irises that turn scarlet in times of anger or emotional turmoil.^{[ch. 7]} Five years prior to the series, the entire Kurta clan was eradicated by a criminal group known as the Phantom Troupe^{[ch. 2]}, who desecrated the Kurta's bodies by stealing their scarlet eyes, thereafter selling them on the black market. Kurapika participates in the Hunter Exam alongside his newfound friends Gon Freecss, Leorio Paradinight, and Killua Zoldyck in order to become a Blacklist Hunter and gain the resources to take vengeance for his people and retrieve their eyes.^{[ch. 2, 7]} Despite some initial hostilities, Kurapika befriends Leorio after they help Gon save a crew member on the ship taking them to the Hunter Exam. In the final tournament phase, a participant named Hisoka Morow tells Kurapika that he can provide clues that will lead him to the Troupe. After finding the missing Killua, the group splits.^{[ch. 43]}

Kurapika intends to use his Hunter status to earn money to attend the Yorknew City auction. As he prepares for the auction, Kurapika meets another Hunter who teaches him the power of Nen. Kurapika's Nen type is Conjuration in the form of multiple chains he commands attached from his right hand. However, when his eyes turn scarlet, he becomes a Specialist.^{[ch. 83]} His specialist ability, Emperor Time: Absolute Mastery (絶対時間(エンペラータイム), Enperā Taimu), allows him to utilize 100% of all types of Nen but shortens his lifespan by one hour every second he uses it.^{[ch. 83, 364]} Kurapika aligns himself with the Nostrade mafia family as soon as the opportunity presents itself and soon becomes head of Nostrade's bodyguards.^{[ch. 79]} When the Troupe attacks the city, Kurapika tests his power by facing one of their strongest members, Uvogin, killing him in the process thanks to his Specialist skill. Kurapika ends up finding comfort when rejoining Gon, Leorio, and Killua. He tells them about his actions, and, with their ally Melody, they agree to continue tracking the troupe, most notably Pakunoda, who can read people's memories. When Gon and Killua get the chance to fight the Troupe, Kurapika captures the leader, Chrollo Lucilfer. His little finger, Judgement Chain: Arbiter Little Finger (律する小指の鎖(ジャッジメントチェーン), Jajjimento Chēn), stabs Chrollo's heart, allowing Kurapika to issue a command, which kills the enemy if not followed. In Chrollo's case, he can no longer use Nen.^{[ch. 84, 116]} However, Kurapika returns Chrollo to his teammate Pakunoda in exchange for Gon and Killua. Pakunoda's experience with Kurapika leads to her own death.^{[ch. 119]} In the aftermath, Kurapika and Melody secretly leave Yorknew.^{[ch. 124]}

Kurapika is later invited to join the Zodiacs, an organization that oversees Hunters, as the "Rat" based on Leorio's recommendation, and only accepts upon being told that Tserriednich Hui Guo Rou has the last batch of Kurta eyes that he needs to retrieve.^{[ch. 344, 345]} This leads to his accompanying Woble Hui Guo Rou to the Dark Continent as her bodyguard. During this time, he reveals that when he uses his index finger with Emperor Time activated, it turns into Stealth Dolphin: Index Finger in Emperor Time (人指し指の"絶対時間"(ステルスドルフィン), Suterusu Dorufin), a dolphin-like figure only he can see that allows him to use the stolen ability, informing him of its basic details^{[ch. 361]}, and grant the stolen ability to someone else (who then sees Stealth Dolphin as well) for a single use.^{[ch. 364]}

=== Other appearances ===
In Hunter × Hunter: Phantom Rouge, Kurapika is investigating a rumor about a survivor of Kurapika's Kurta Clan until they meet a young boy whom Kurapika recognizes as his childhood friend Pairo, who attacks him and steals his eyes. Soon they learn of Omokage, a former member of the Phantom Troupe who was defeated and replaced by Hisoka. Omokage sends the Pairo and Illumi dolls to attack the Hunters, but Gon and Kurapika defeat them with Leorio and Killua's help and retrieve their eyes. With Omokage defeated, Kurapika offers him a chance to be spared in exchange for having his powers sealed for life, but he refuses. Killua offers himself to kill Omokage in Kurapika's place, but the puppeteer is then stabbed by Retsu, who claims that he had already caused enough suffering to her and her friends. The real Phantom Troupe arrives soon after, but they decide to let Kurapika and Hisoka leave, claiming that they will settle their scores with them on another day. Togashi wrote the two-part manga Kurapika Tsuioku-hen to act as a prequel to the film.

In Hunter × Hunter: The Last Mission, Kurapika, who was present at the tournament to escort his employer, Neon, confronts the invading Shura. He defeats Shura with Leorio's help, but before dying, Shura infects Kurapika with Jed's blood, sealing his Nen and claiming that he will die. Leorio stays behind to take care of Kurapika until Hunter Netero defeats the invader. After saying farewell to his friends again, Kurapika goes back to the Nostrade Family.

The character is also playable in the fighting game Hunter × Hunter: Nen × Impact. He is also a support character in the crossocers Jump Super Stars and playable character in Jump Force.

== Reception ==
Kurapika is a popular character with fans, coming in second place in the series's first two popularity polls. The character has also been the subject of cosplay within the anime fandom. Coolens Opticals also created glasses using Kurapika's image as well as his chains. On a MyNavi popularity poll involving androgynous characters, he placed second behind Kurama from YuYu Hakusho. THEM Anime Reviews found Kurapika complex even if he comes across as an odd character. Muhammad from Syarif Hidayatullah State Islamic University Jakarta noticed the series has a trend of reuniting the characters in the same exams where they befriend each other, which helps them pass most tests as teammates. The early episodes also help to convey more of each of their own arcs, with Kurapika revealing a darker side the more he appears in the story as his revenge quest is explored in the examinations but is not developed until its end. Website Polygon listed Kurapika as one of their "favorite boys" in anime based on his tragic backstory as well as coming across as more "snarky" rather than "cool and deserved". This is mostly due to his corruption in the Spider arc when he starts hunting down the title villains in order to accomplish his revenge. IGN made an entire article dedicated to explaining Kurapika's complicated Hatsu, regarding the powers he develops in the series strong enough to be one of the most powerful fighters in the series.

In regard to Kurapika's role in later arcs, Comic Book Resources noted that as Kurapika is often given dark roles even in his introductions, in the end he goes on to become more likable when it comes to helping others like with Gon when he abandons his duel with Leorio in the process. Anime News Network praised Kurapika's dark characterization in Yorknew as he contemplates the idea of killing the members of the Spiders to the point he feels like the actual main character despite Gon and Killua still starring. Much of the praise involving this story includes how much more mature the narrative feels when Kurapika contemplates his revenge and his mental breakdown after killing for the first time. The design given to Kurapika's chains received similar praise as well as Cheryl McMaster's voice acting. When revisiting this story arc in Madhouse's remake of the anime, Anime News Network said that although Kurapika's arc ends in an anticlimactic fashion with little action when compared with other series from the same genre, the way the narrative handles Kurapika's character arc as he is forced to choose between his friends and revenge. Due to Kurapika not being present in the anime adaptations after the Spider arc, Comic Book Resources noted his popularity fell as Madhouse's anime never adapted his later role as a bodyguard from the manga. Kurapika's eventual return as a bodyguard in the manga was praised by The Fandom Post for how he handles information about Nen across several chapters and pays attention to every detail centered around him.

In a play of the series, Kurapika was played by Yuki Ogoe. Ogoe was praised for his androgynous look and design. Ameblo later compared Ogoe's take on Kurapika with Yuta Okkotsu from Jujutsu Kaisen 0 as he was played by the same actor. According to AmeBlo, Yuta was a more fitting role for Ogoe than his previous work due to their different haircolor and school uniform, making his characterization more fitting.
