= Gois =

Gois, De Góis or Degois can refer to:

- Bento de Góis (1562–1607), Portuguese traveller, probably the first European to travel overland from India to China via Afghanistan
- Damião de Góis, 16th-century Portuguese philosopher
- Typhanie Degois (born 1992), French politician
- The Passage du Gois, a natural, periodically flooded passage leading to the island of Noirmoutier in France
- Góis, a town and municipality in Portugal
- Gois (moth), a genus of moths in the family Megalopygidae

== See also ==
- Goes (disambiguation)
