= Matoi the Sacred Slayer =

Japanese anime television series

- Key visual

装神少女まとい (Sōshin Shōjo Matoi)
- Genre: Magical girl
- Anime television series
- Directed by: Masayuki Sakoi
- Produced by: Ryōsuke Nakaji; Terunari Yoshie; Tomoko Takahashi; Kimuniwa Kozue; Toru Komagine; Takeshi Ishigaki; Noriyuki Nagatani; Toshiyasu Hayashi; Takeshi Iwasa
- Written by: Yōsuke Kuroda
- Music by: Tatsuya Kato
- Studio: White Fox
- Licensed by: AUS: Madman Entertainment; NA: Sentai Filmworks; UK: MVM Films
- Original network: Tokyo MX, Sun TV, KBS, BS11
- English network: SEA: Animax Asia; US: Anime Network
- Original run: October 4, 2016 – December 27, 2016
- Episodes: 12 + OVA

Matoi the Sacred Slayer (装神少女まとい, Sōshin Shōjo Matoi) is a Japanese magical girl anime television series produced by White Fox. It was announced in July 2016 as White Fox's first original anime series that aired between October 4 and December 27, 2016.

== Plot ==
Matoi Sumeragi, a second-year junior high school student, works part-time as a shrine maiden at Tenman Shrine in the city of Kamaya. Her close friend Yuma Kusanagi is part of the family of the shrine's chief priest, and is a candidate to be the successor shrine maiden. One day, Matoi and Yuma walk from the school to the shrine as usual, but when they arrive, they are greeted by the shrine's now damaged grounds, and Yuma's parents have both collapsed from their wounds. Matoi's father Shingo, a police detective, launches an investigation, and he comes upon a man who does not seem entirely sane, his only witness. When he holds down the man, Yuma begins the ritual of Divine Possession. Something strange then happens, not with Yuma, but with Matoi. Matoi Sumeragi, who had only wanted a normal, peaceful life, takes the role of a god, and gains the power to banish evil spirits.

== Characters ==
Matoi Sumeragi (皇 まとい, Sumeragi Matoi)
Voiced by: Ayaka Suwa
Matoi is a 14-year old second year junior high school student that works part-time at Tenman Shrine as a shrine maiden. Matoi's mother went missing and she lived with her grandparents. She currently lives with her father, Shingo.
Yuma Kusanagi (草薙 ゆま, Kusanagi Yuma)
Voiced by: Naomi Ōzora
Yuma is a 13-year old first-year junior high school student, and the candidate for the next shrine maiden of Tenman Shrine. Yuma is an innocent and energetic girl.
Clarus Tonitrus (クラルス・トニトルス, Kurarusu Tonitorusu)
Voiced by: Haruka Tomatsu
Clarus is a 15-year old member of Fatima, the Vatican's secret Anti-Creed service.
Shingo Sumeragi (皇 伸吾, Sumeragi Shingo)
Voiced by: Hiroki Tōchi
Shingo is Matoi's father and a police officer. Matoi calls him by his first name, because they've only recently gotten to know each other.
Shiori Sumeragi (皇 しおり, Sumeragi Shiori)
Voiced by: Yuki Kaida
Shiori is Matoi's mother who went missing several years prior to the start of the story.
Haruka Luciela (春夏・ルシエラ, Haruka Rushiera)
Voiced by: Ayako Kawasumi
Luciela is an IATO special agent investigating the demonic "Nights".
Cariot (カリオテ, Kariote)
Voiced by: Nobuyuki Hiyama
Cariot is a member of Fatima and is often seen with Clarus.
Hideo Tezuka (手塚 秀夫, Tezuka Hideo)
Voiced by: Atsushi Abe
Nicknamed "Pochi", Hideo is Shingo's partner.
Flors Oriens (フロース・オリエンス, Furōsu Oriensu)
Voiced by: Satomi Satō
Flors is Clarus' previous partner. She was incapacitated by the monstrous Night called "Creed Killer".

== Media ==
=== Anime ===
The original series is produced by White Fox, directed by Masayuki Sakoi and written by Yōsuke Kuroda, featuring character designs by Mai Toda and music by Tatsuya Kato. The opening theme is Chōmusubi Amulet (蝶結びアミュレット,Chōmusubi amyuretto, "Butterfly Knot Amulet") by Mia Regina. The voice actress unit Sphere, made up of Minako Kotobuki, Ayahi Takagaki, Haruka Tomatsu, and Aki Toyosaki, performs the anime's ending theme song, "My Only Place". The anime series had a stage event at the Kyoto International Manga and Anime Fair 2016 on September 17, 2016. Sentai Filmworks has licensed the anime in North America and it was streamed on the Hulu and Anime Network. Madman Entertainment was streaming the series on AnimeLab. MVM Films will release the series in the United Kingdom.

==== Episode list ====
No.	Title (Note: All English episode titles are taken from Anime Network.)	
1	"I'm Possessed!" "Watashi, Kami-gakattemasu" (私、神懸かってます)	October 4, 2016
2	"I Clad Myself In A God" "Kamisama, Matoimashita" (神様、纏いました)	October 11, 2016
3	"God's Playing Dumb" "Kamisama wa Shiranpuri" (神様は知らんぷり)	October 18, 2016
4	"Her Resolution and My Reason" "Kanojo no Kakugo to Watashi no Riyū" (彼女の覚悟と私の理由)	October 25, 2016
5	"A Special Kind of Ordinary" "Tokubetsu na Futsū" (特別な普通)	November 1, 2016
6	"I'm Sorry" "Gomen nasai" (ごめんなさい)	November 8, 2016
7	"The Sea, Hot Springs, and Sometimes Evil Spirits" "Umi to Onsen, Tokidoki Akuryō" (海と温泉、ときどき悪霊)	November 15, 2016
8	"A Small Wish" "Chiisa na Negai" (ちいさな願い)	November 22, 2016
9	"Thank You" "Arigatō" (ありがとう)	November 29, 2016
10	"The Open Gate" "Hirakareshi Mon" (開かれし門)	December 6, 2016
11	"See You Later!" "Ittekimasu" (いってきます)	December 13, 2016
12	"Being Ordinary's the Best!" "Futsū ga Ichiban" (普通がいちばん)	December 20, 2016
TV–Special	"Special Program" "Yuma, Matomemashita: Nani mo Kite Nakute... Natsu" (ゆまちん、まとめました～何も着てなくて...夏～)	December 27, 2016
OVA	"Nightsbusters Corporation" "Kabushikigaisha naite basutāzu" (株式会社ナイツ・バスターズ)	April 21, 2017
Note: In this episode, a creature that resembles Slimer from the 1984 Ghostbusters film can be seen at 8.57, and Sonico from Super Sonico makes a cameo appearance at 11.54.
