= Joaquim Goes =

Indian scientist

- Education: Nagoya University; University of Mumbai
- Spouse: Helga Gomes
- Scientific career
- Fields: Oceanography
- Workplaces: Lamont–Doherty Earth Observatory
- Website: www.ldeo.columbia.edu/user/jig

Joaquim Goés is a research professor at the Lamont–Doherty Earth Observatory at Columbia University. Goés was formerly a scientist at the Bigelow Laboratory for Ocean Sciences, Maine, United States, where he was awarded the International Takeda Techno-Entrepreneurship Award in Environmental Sciences for his research on the influence of solar ultraviolet radiation in marine ecosystems.

Goés' research focuses on new methods to evaluate and predict the effects of ozone depletion and its implications for human health and ecosystems, as well as methods for managing and minimizing these risks.

Goés, from the region of Goa along the Indian west coast, was earlier part of the National Institute of Oceanography at Dona Paula, India.
