= Fabio Góes =

- Born: Fabio Góes; 4 December 1975 (age 50); São Paulo, SP, Brazil
- Genres: pop, MPB, world
- Occupations: Singer, songwriter, producer
- Instruments: Vocal, guitar, bass, piano
- Labels: Phonobase Music Services, Reco-Head
- Website: fabiogoes.com

Fabio Góes (born 4 December 1975, in São Paulo) is a Brazilian singer, songwriter and musician. He released his first album Sol no Escuro (Sun in the Dark) in 2007. The album appeared in the top 15 best albums of the year in Rolling Stone magazine. The critic Pedro Alexandre Sanches, from Carta Capital, highlighted "the inspiration, the swing, subtlety and care" of Góes; Ricardo Alexandre – in one of the last editions of Bizz magazine – gave five stars to the album for its "detailing, care, sophistication and maturity."

In late 2008, songs from "Sol no Escuro" were selected for inclusion in the soundtrack of HBO's acclaimed Brazilian sitcom Alice, which was directed by Sergio Machado and Karin Ainouz. The song "Sem Mentira" won a video produced by HBO. In 2009, one of his songs, "Pictures", was featured in a Ford Edge commercial.

For nearly a decade, Góes was also a composer and music producer for films and commercials. He was part of the composers team for films such as "Abril Despedaçado" (Behind the Sun/2001), by Walter Salles, Cidade de Deus, by Fernando Meirelles and Kátia Lund, the documentary Pixote in memoriam (2006) by Felix Gilbert and Briso Topczewski and the award-winning short film Balada das Duas Mocinhas de Botafogo (2006), by João Caetano Feyer and Fernando Valle.

He was also the co-producer of Freak to Meet You – The Very Best of Jumbo Elektro (The Ultimate Compilation), the debut album of the band Jumbo Elektro, released in 2004.

His song "Sonhando", co-written with Ed Côrtes and interpreted by Céu, is part of the soundtrack of the movie Não por Acaso (Not by Chance/2008). This is the first film from director Philippe Barcinski.

In 2011, Góes released his second album named O Destino Vestido de Noiva featuring Kassin, Curumin and Luísa Maita. The album entered the Top 10 list of Rolling Stone magazine.

== Albums ==
- Sol no Escuro (2007)
- O Destino Vestido de Noiva (2011)

== Prizes and Nominees ==
- "Sol no Escuro": 2007 Top 15 Best Albums on Rolling Stone magazine.
- "O Destino Vestido de Noiva": 2011 Top 10 Best Albums on Rolling Stone magazine.
