= Goes! =

2016 video game

- Developer: Petit Reve
- Publisher: Future Tech Lab
- Platform: PlayStation Vita
- Release: November 25, 2016
- Genre: Otome game
- Mode: Single-player

Goes! is a Japanese female-oriented drama CD developed by Petit Reve and published by Future Tech Lab. The series spans 5 volumes, with the first one being released on August 27, 2014, and the last one released on November 5, 2016. Between January 27, 2016, and April 20, 2016, four image song albums were also released. On November 25, 2016, Future Tech Lab released an otome visual novel video game adaptation for PlayStation Vita, developed by Petit Reve.

== Reception ==
Japanese gaming magazine Famitsu gave the PlayStation Vita game a score of three sevens and an eight, for a total of 29 out of 40.
